= List of lakes of Turkey =

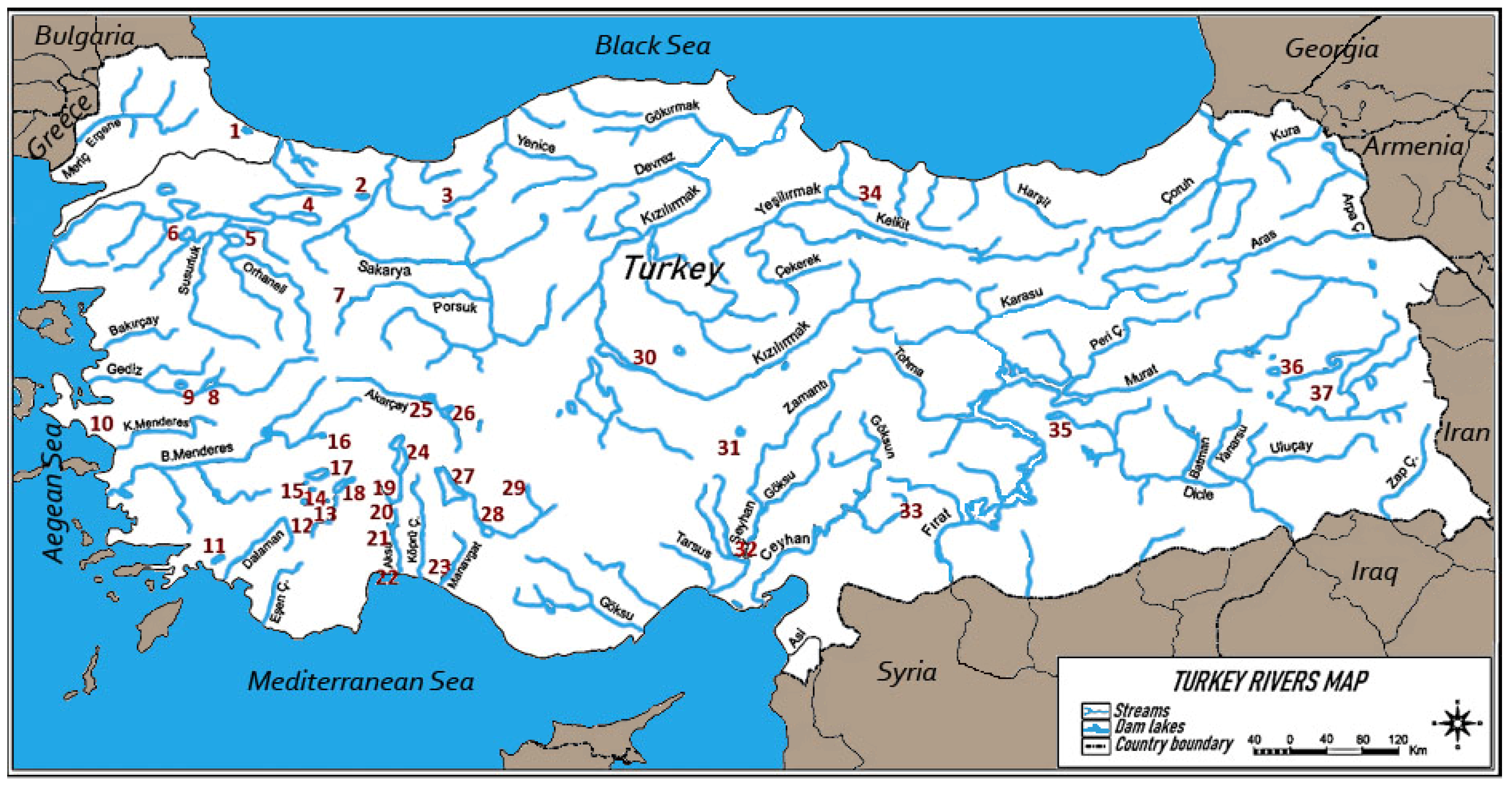
Map of Turkey (and adjacent areas) with major lakes, together with their river systems.

== Natural lakes ==
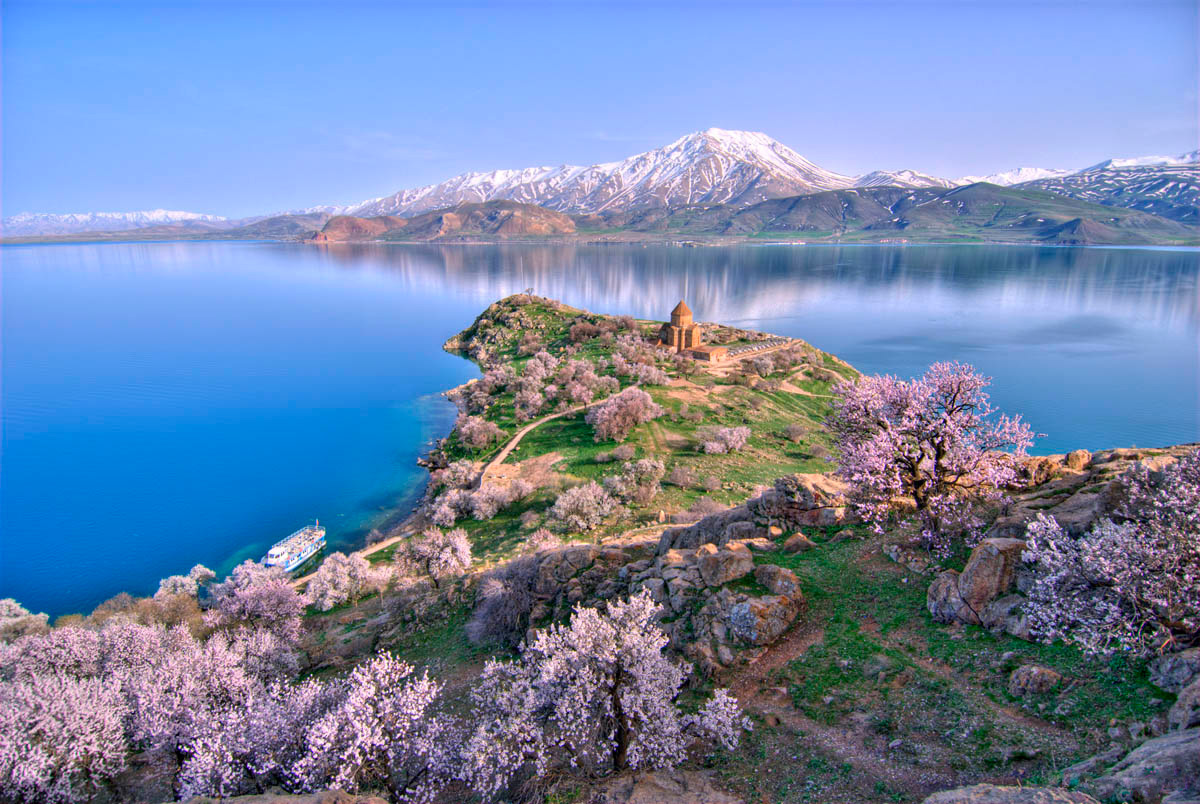
Lake Van

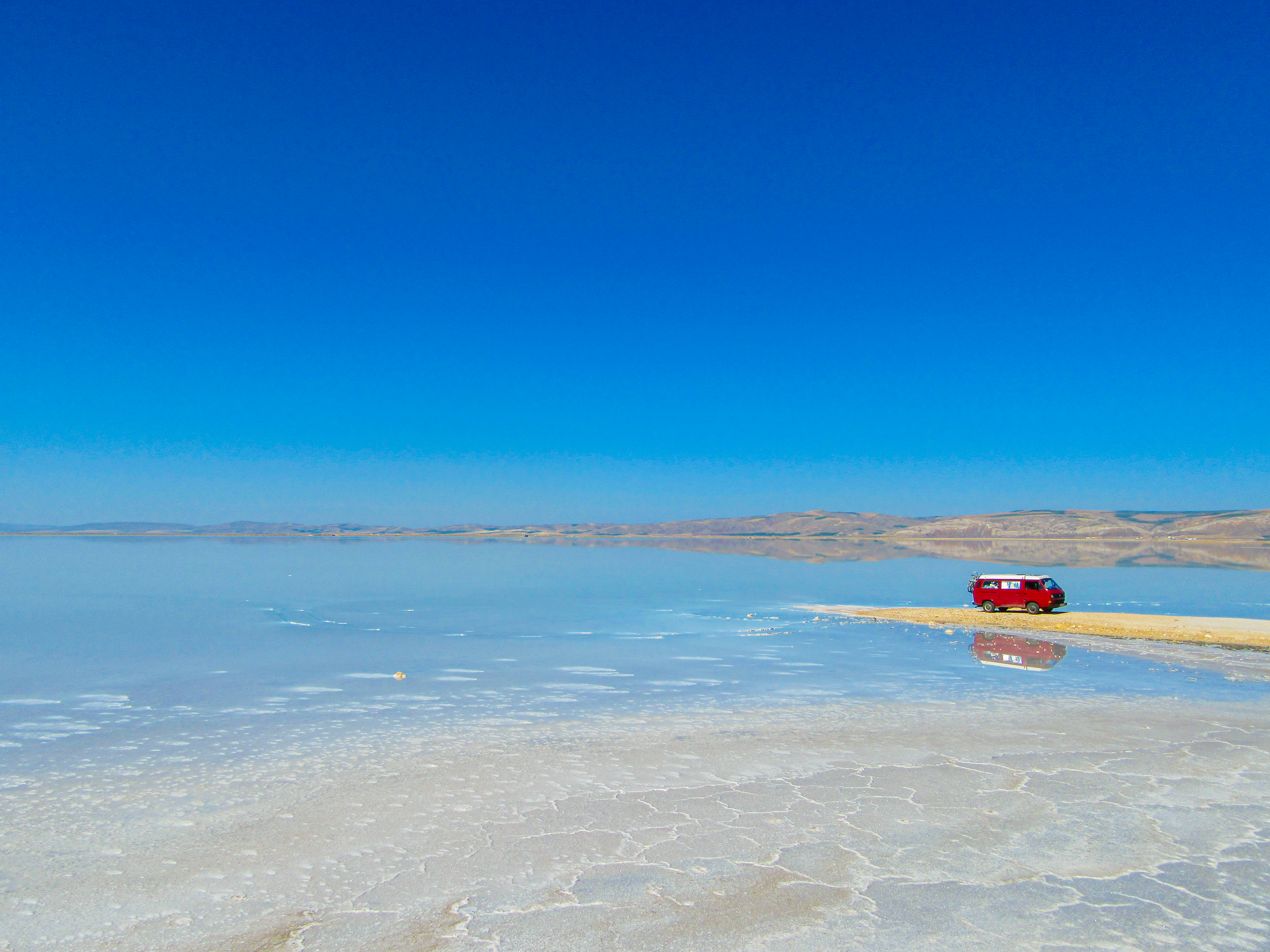
Lake Tuz

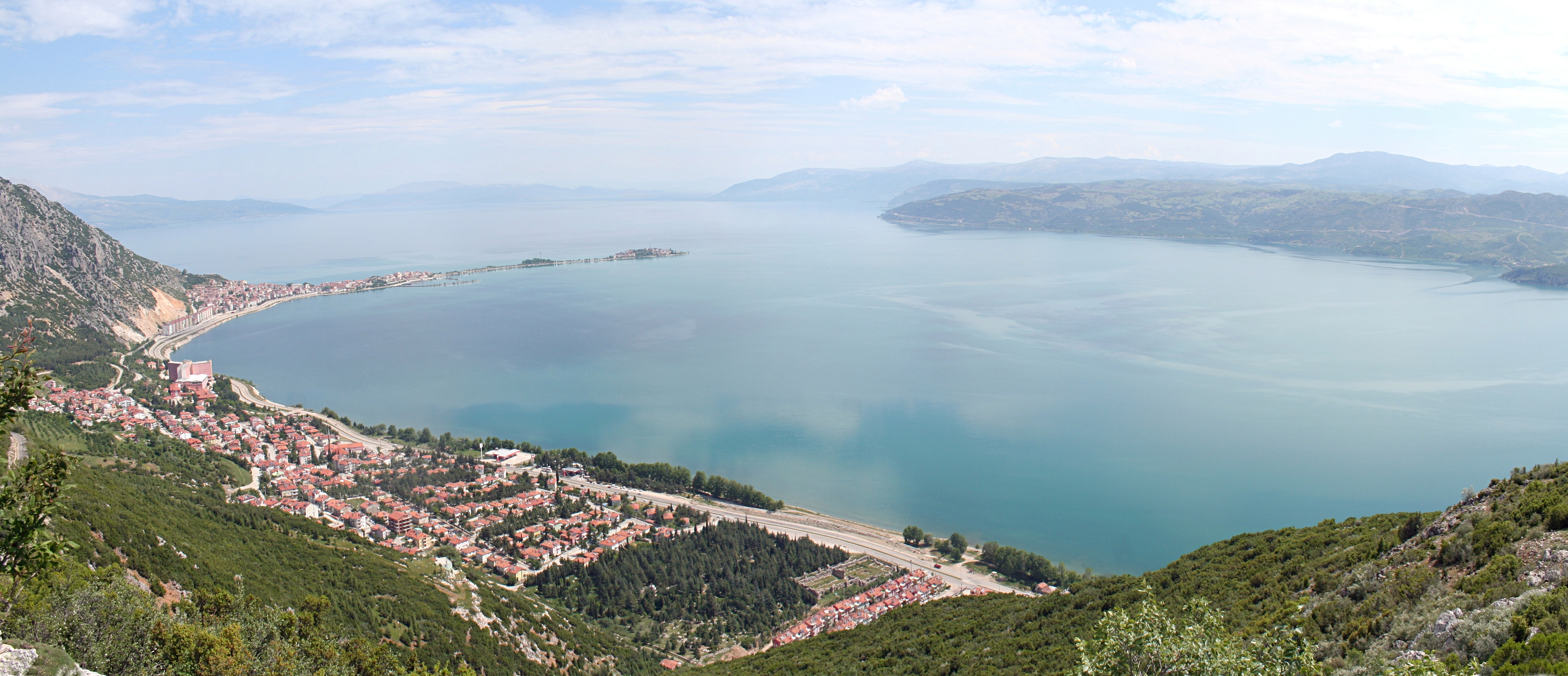
Lake Eğirdir

Lake İznik

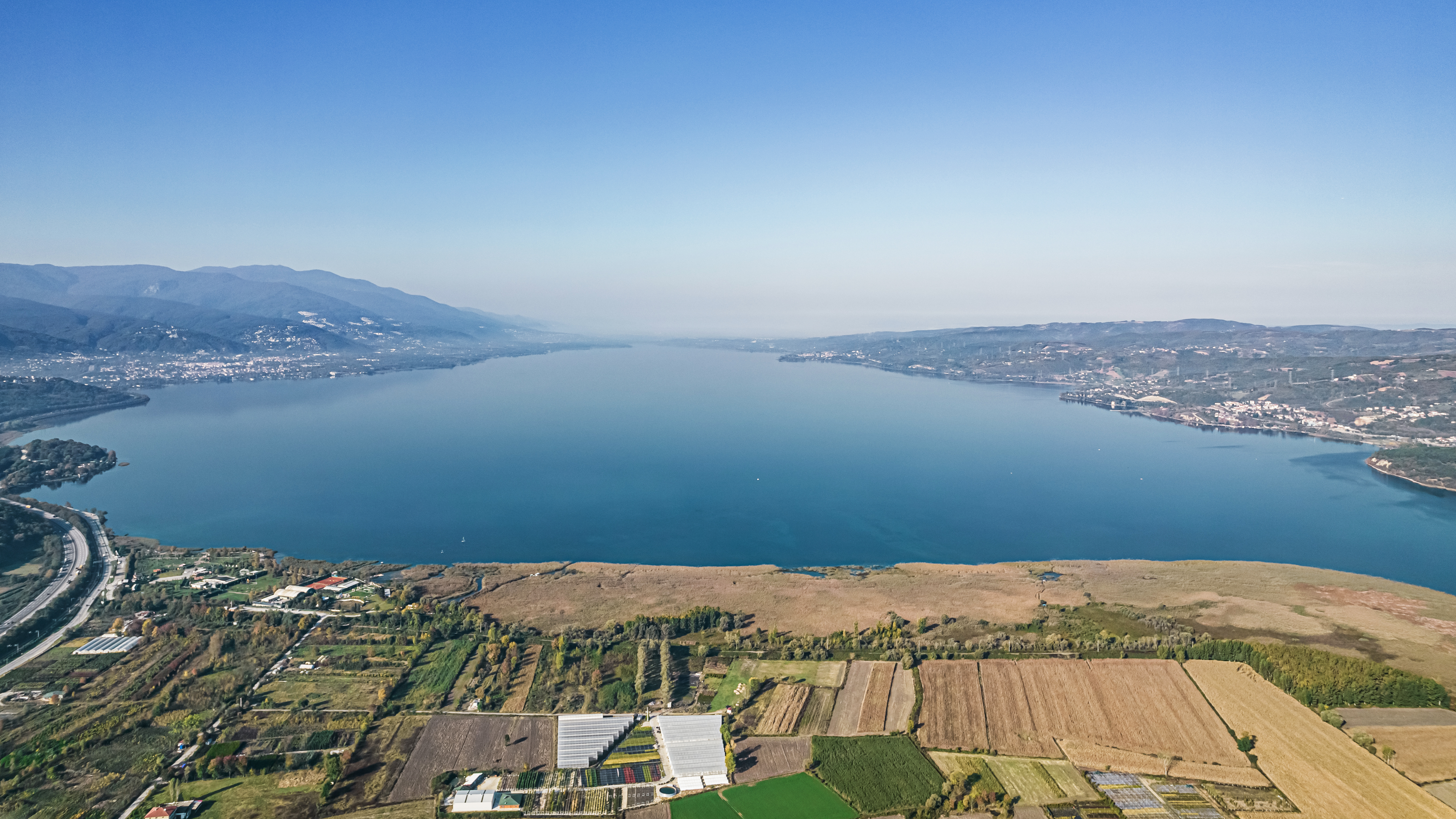
Lake Sapanca

Name in English	Name in Turkish	Area (km^{2})	Depth	Location (districts and/or provinces)
Lake Van	Van Gölü	3755 km^{2}	451 m	Van, Bitlis
Lake Tuz	Tuz Gölü	1500 km^{2}	2 m	Aksaray, Ankara, Konya
Lake Beyşehir	Beyşehir Gölü	656 km^{2}	10 m	Beyşehir in Konya, Isparta
Lake Eğirdir	Eğirdir Gölü	482 km^{2}		Isparta
Lake İznik	İznik Gölü	308 km^{2}		İznik in Bursa, Yalova
Lake Burdur	Burdur Gölü	200 km^{2}		Burdur, Isparta
Lake Manyas	Manyas Gölü	166 km^{2}		Balıkesir
Lake Acıgöl	Acıgöl	153 km^{2}		Denizli, Afyonkarahisar
Lake Uluabat	Uluabat Gölü	134 km^{2}	1–2 m	Bursa
Lake Çıldır	Çıldır Gölü	115 km^{2}		Ardahan, Kars
Lake Palas Tuzla	Palas Tuzla Gölü	106 km^{2}	15 m	Palas/Kayseri
Lake Akşehir	Akşehir Gölü	105 km^{2}		Akşehir in Konya, Afyonkarahisar
Lake Eber	Eber Gölü	104 km^{2}		Afyonkarahisar
Lake Erçek	Erçek Gölü	98 km^{2}		Van
Lake Hazar	Hazar Gölü	86 km^{2}		Elazığ
Lake Bafa	Bafa Gölü	60 km^{2}		Aydın, Muğla
Lake Köyceğiz	Köyceğiz Gölü	52 km^{2}		Köyceğiz in Muğla
Lake Işıklı	Işıklı Gölü	49 km^{2}		Denizli
Lake Nazik	Nazik Gölü	48 km^{2}		Bitlis
Lake Sapanca	Sapanca Gölü	47 km^{2}		Sakarya Province
Lake Salda	Salda Gölü	45 km^{2}	184 m	Burdur
Lake Yay	Yay Gölü	37 km^{2}		Kayseri
Lake Akyatan	Akyatan Gölü	35 km^{2}		Adana
Lake Balık	Balık Gölo	34 km^{2}		Doğubeyazıt in Ağrı
Lake Marmara	Marmara Gölü	34 km^{2}		Salihli, Gölmarmara in Manisa
Lake Çöl	Çöl Gölü	32 km^{2}		Ankara
Lake Çavuşlu	Çavuşlu Gölü	31 km^{2}		Konya
Lake Durusu (Lake Terkos)	Durusu Gölü	25 km^{2}		Istanbul
Lake Dil (Lake Karine)	Karine Gölü	24 km^{2}		
Lake Tuzla	Tuzla Gölü	23 km^{2}		Adana
Lake Küçükçekmece	Küçükçekmece Gölü	16 km^{2}		Küçükçekmece, Istanbul
Lake Yarışlı	Yarışlı Gölü	16 km^{2}		Burdur
Lake Seyfe	Seyfe Gölü	15 km^{2}		Kırşehir
Lake Akyayan	Akyayan Gölü	15 km^{2}		Adana
Lake Aktaş (Hozapin)	Hozapin Gölü	14 km^{2}		Ardahan
Lake Arın	Arın Gölü	13 km^{2}		Bitlis Province
Lake Nemrut	Nemrut Gölü	12 km^{2}		Bitlis Province
Lake Balık	Balık Gölü	12 km^{2}		Ağrı Province
Lake Büyükçekmece	Büyükçekmece Gölü	11 km^{2}		Büyükçekmece, Istanbul
Lake Bolluk	Bolluk Gölü	11 km^{2}		
Lake Akdoğan	Akdoğan Gölü	11 km^{2}		Varto, Muş
Lake Haçlı	Haçlı Gölü	10 km^{2}		Bulanık, Muş
Lake Karataş	Karataş Gölü	10 km^{2}		Karamanlı, Burdur
Lake Çavuşçu	Çavuşlu Gölü	9 km^{2}		
Lake Düden	Düden Gölü	8 km^{2}		
Lake Gala	Gala Gölü	8 km^{2}		Edirne
Lake Mogan	Mogan Gölü	6 km^{2}		Ankara
Paradeniz	Paradeniz	4 km^{2}		Mersin
Lake Meke	Meke Gölü	2.57 km^{2}		Konya
Lake Kuyucuk	Kuyucuk Gölü	2.45 km^{2}	13 m	Kars
Beymelek	Beymelek Kuş Cenneti	2.25 km^{2}		Antalya
Lake Eymir	Eymir Gölü	1.8 km^{2}		Ankara
Lake Kömüşini	Kömüşini Gölü	1.5 km^{2}		Konya
Lake Abant	Abant Gölü	1.28 km^{2}	18 m	Bolu
Lake Gölcük	Gölcük Gölü	1 km^{2}		İzmir
Lake Poyrazlar	Poyrazlar Gölü	0.67 km^{2}		Sakarya
Lake Aygır (Erzurum)	Aygır Gölü			Erzurum
Lake Aygır (Kars)	Aygır Gölü			Kars
Lake Aygır	Aygır Gölü			Bitlis
Lake Kaz	Kaz Gölü	0.93 km^{2}		Muş
Lake Ahır	Ahır Gölü	9 km^{2}		Erzurum
Lake Atar	Atar Gölü			Ağrı
Lake Batmış	Batmış Gölü	3 km^{2}		Bitlis
Lake Hıdırmenteş	Hıdırmenteş Gölü			Van
Lake Süphan	Süphan Gölü	1 km^{2}		Van
Lake Gövelek	Gövelek Gölü			Van
Lake Turna	Turna Gölü	7 km^{2}		Van
Lake Akgöl	Akgöl Gölü	7 km^{2}		Van
Lake Bahri	Bahri Gölü	1 km^{2}		Bingöl
Lake Karagöl	Karagöl Gölü			Tunceli
Lake Gerendal	Gerendal Gölü			Elazığ
Lake Aygır (Trabzon)	Aygır Gölü	3.75 km^{2}		Trabzon

== Reservoir and dam lakes ==
Name	Area (km^{2})	Depth	Location
Atatürk Reservoir	817 km^{2}		Şanlıurfa, Adıyaman, Diyarbakır
Keban Baraj Gölü	675 km^{2}		Elazığ, Tunceli, Erzincan
Ilısu Baraj Gölü	313 km^{2}		Mardin, Şırnak, Siirt, Batman
Karakaya Baraj Gölü	298 km^{2}		Malatya, Elazığ, Diyarbakır
Hirfanlı Baraj Gölü	263 km^{2}		Ankara, Kırşehir
Silvan Baraj Gölü	178 km^{2}		Diyarbakır
Altınkaya Baraj Gölü	118 km^{2}		Samsun
Alpaslan-1 Baraj Gölü	115 km^{2}		Muş
Alpaslan-2 Baraj Gölü	55 km^{2}		Muş
Sarıyar Baraj Gölü	83 km^{2}		Ankara, Eskişehir
Seyhan Baraj Gölü	67 km^{2}		Adana
Kılıçkaya Baraj Gölü	64 km^{2}		Sivas, Giresun
Aslantaş Baraj Gölü	49 km^{2}		Adana
Demirköprü Baraj Gölü	47 km^{2}		Manisa
Karacaören Baraj Gölü	45 km^{2}		Burdur, Isparta
Büyükçekmece Baraj Gölü	43 km^{2}		Istanbul
Menzelet Baraj Gölü	42 km^{2}		Kahramanmaraş
Arpaçay Baraj Gölü	41 km^{2}		Kars

== See also ==
- Geography of Turkey
- Regions of Turkey
- Rivers of Turkey
- Dams and reservoirs of Turkey
- Turkish Lakes Region, in southwest Anatolia
