= Gulf of Mersin =

Bay near Mersin, Turkey

Gulf of Mersin (Turkish: Mersin Körfezi) is one of the widest gulfs in Turkey. It is in the northeast of the Mediterranean Sea between the gulfs of İskenderun and Antalya.

== Location ==
The gulf of Mersin is between Taşucu 36°18′N 34°02′E in the west and Karataş 36°32′N 35°22′E in the east. The total distance between these two points is approximately 115 km. ( ≈ 71 mi or 62 nmi). The city of Mersin is roughly at the center of the coastline. The total water surface is about 2 300 km^{2} ( ≈ 888 mi^{2} ) The deepest point is 365 m ( ≈ 1197 ft.) The western region of the gulf is slightly deeper than the eastern region.

== Rivers ==
The main rivers to the gulf are Göksu in the west, Berdan (Tarsus) and Seyhan in the east. There are also a number of smaller rivers such as Alata, Limonlu, Tece, Mezitli and Müftü. (The smaller rivers usually have irregular flow rates depending on the season.)

== Coastal settlement ==
The biggest city of the gulf is Mersin which is one of the metropolitan centers in Turkey. Port of Mersin with a well established harbor and related infrastructure is one of the biggest ports of Turkey. The port is mainly oriented towards export.

Erdemli which is in the west of Mersin is a district center. Taşucu and Karataş are smaller towns. In Taşucu, there is a minor port which is a terminal for Cyprus ferries. Just east of Taşucu there is a fishery in the Göksu Delta. Along the coast there are also coastal villages most of which are specialised in citrus production.
