= Aygır Gölü =

Aygır Gölü or Aygir Golu may refer to:

- Lake Aygır (Trabzon), a lake in the province of Trabzon
- Lake Aygır (Kars), a lake in the province of Kars
- Lake Aygır (Erzurum), a lake in the province of Erzurum, Turkey
- Lake Aygır, a lake in the province of Bitlis
