= Yarışlı =

Yarışlı may refer to places in Turkey such as:

- Yarışlı, Şuhut
- Yarışlı, Yeşilova
- Lake Yarışlı
