= Lake Yarışlı =

- Yarişlı Gölü (Turkish)
- Location within Turkey
- Location: Turkey
- Coordinates: 37°33′33″N 29°57′55″E
- Type: salt lake
- Surface area: 20,000 decares (20 km^{2}; 7.7 sq mi)

Lake Yarışlı (Turkish: Yarışlı Gölü) is a lake in Turkey.

== Geography ==
The lake is situated at 37°33′33″N 29°57′55″E. Yeşilova ilçe (district ) of Burdur Province is to the west of the lake. It is in a closed basin of Turkey which is popularly called Göller Yöresi ("the region of lakes"). Lake Burdur is to the north east, Lake Salda is to the west and Lake Karataş is to the south of Lake Yarışlı.

The area of the lake is 20,000 decares (20 km^{2}; 7.7 sq mi). It is a salt lake. There is an islet in the eastern part of the lake. The archaeological site of Tymbrianassus is at the eastern shore of lake.
