= Sultan Reedy National Park =

National park in Kayseri, Turkey

- Sultan Sazlığı Milli Parkı
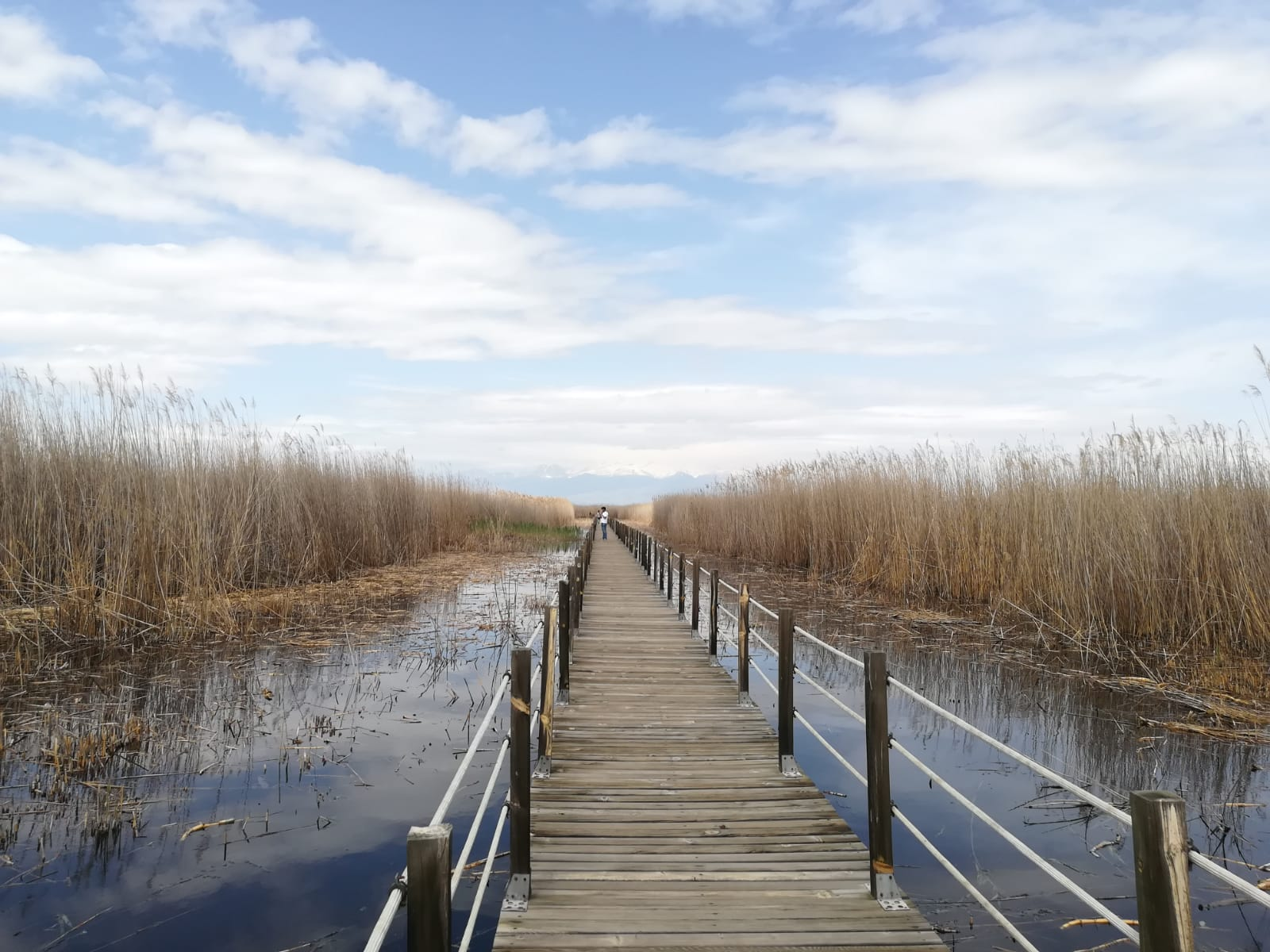
- A view of Lake Yay and Sultan Reedy National Park.

- Location within Turkey
- Location: Yeşilhisar-Develi-Yahyalı, Kayseri Province, Turkey
- Coordinates: 38°14′32″N 35°11′08″E
- Area: 24,357 ha (60,190 acres)
- Established: March 17, 2006
- Governing body: Ministry of Forest and Water Management
- Website: www.milliparklar.gov.tr/mp/sultansazligi/index.htm

Ramsar Wetland
- Official name: Sultan Marshes
- Designated: 13 July 1994
- Reference no.: 661

Sultan Reedy National Park (Turkish: Sultan Sazlığı Milli Parkı), a.k.a. Sultan Marshes, established on March 17, 2006, is a national park in central Turkey. It is located around Lake Yay between the Yeşilhisar, Develi and Yahyalı districts of Kayseri Province. It was designated a Ramsar site on July 13, 1994.

It covers an area of 24,357 ha (60,190 acres) at 1,000 m (3,300 ft) above main sea level.

== Gallery ==
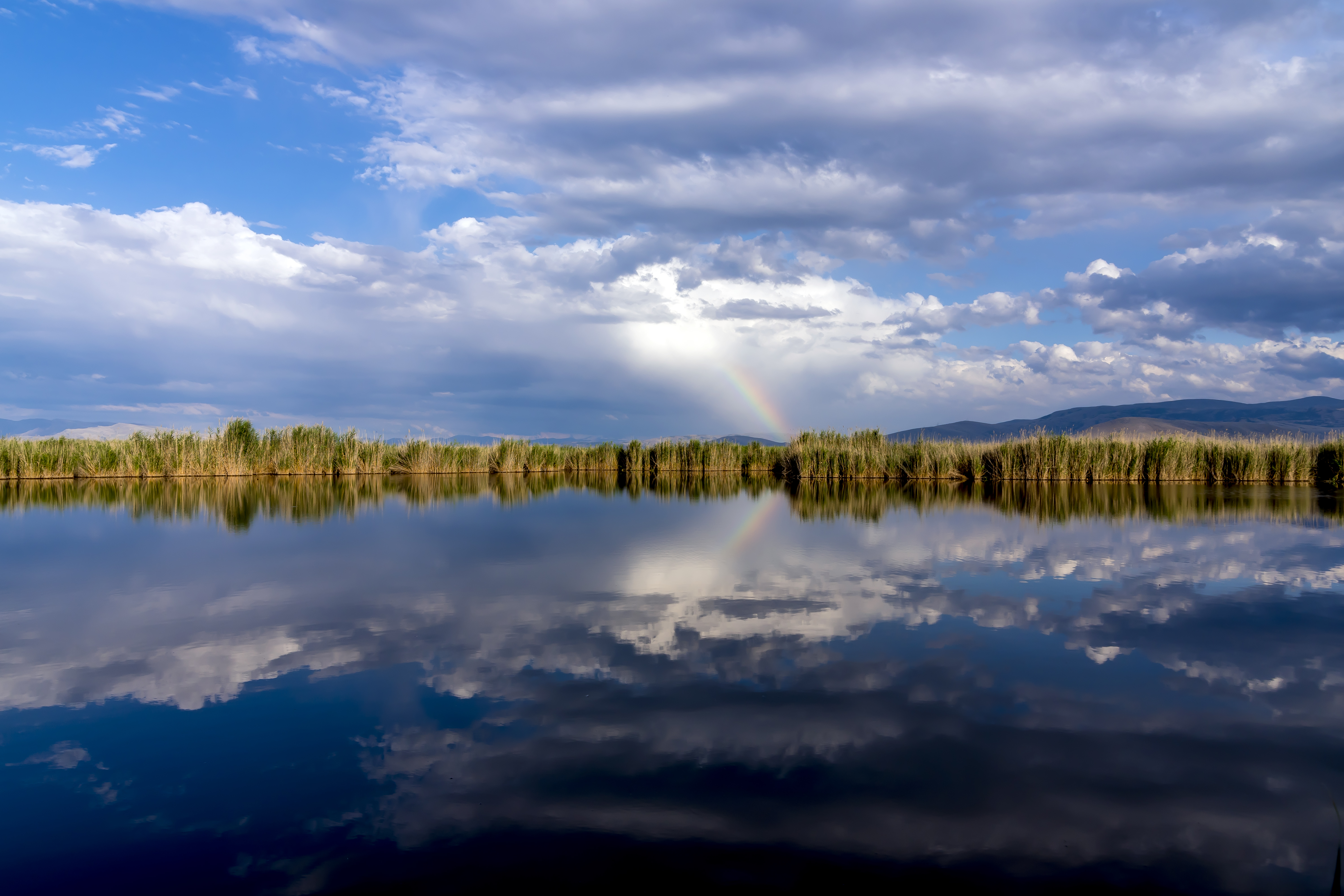
Rainbow in reeds

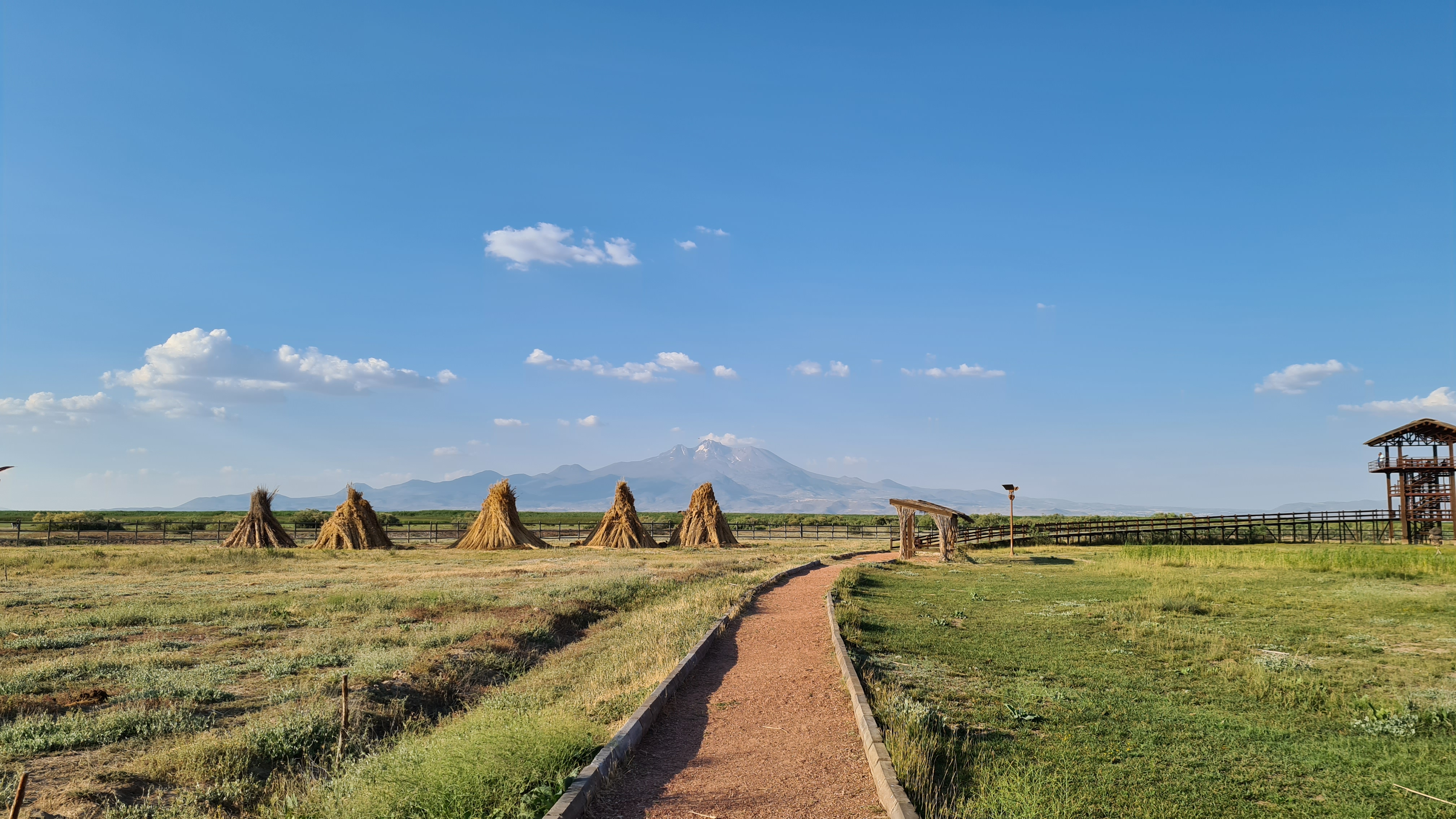
Mount Erciyes seen from Sultan Sazlığı National Park.
