= Lake Tuzla =

Lake in Adana provence, Turkey

- Tuzla Gölü (Turkish)
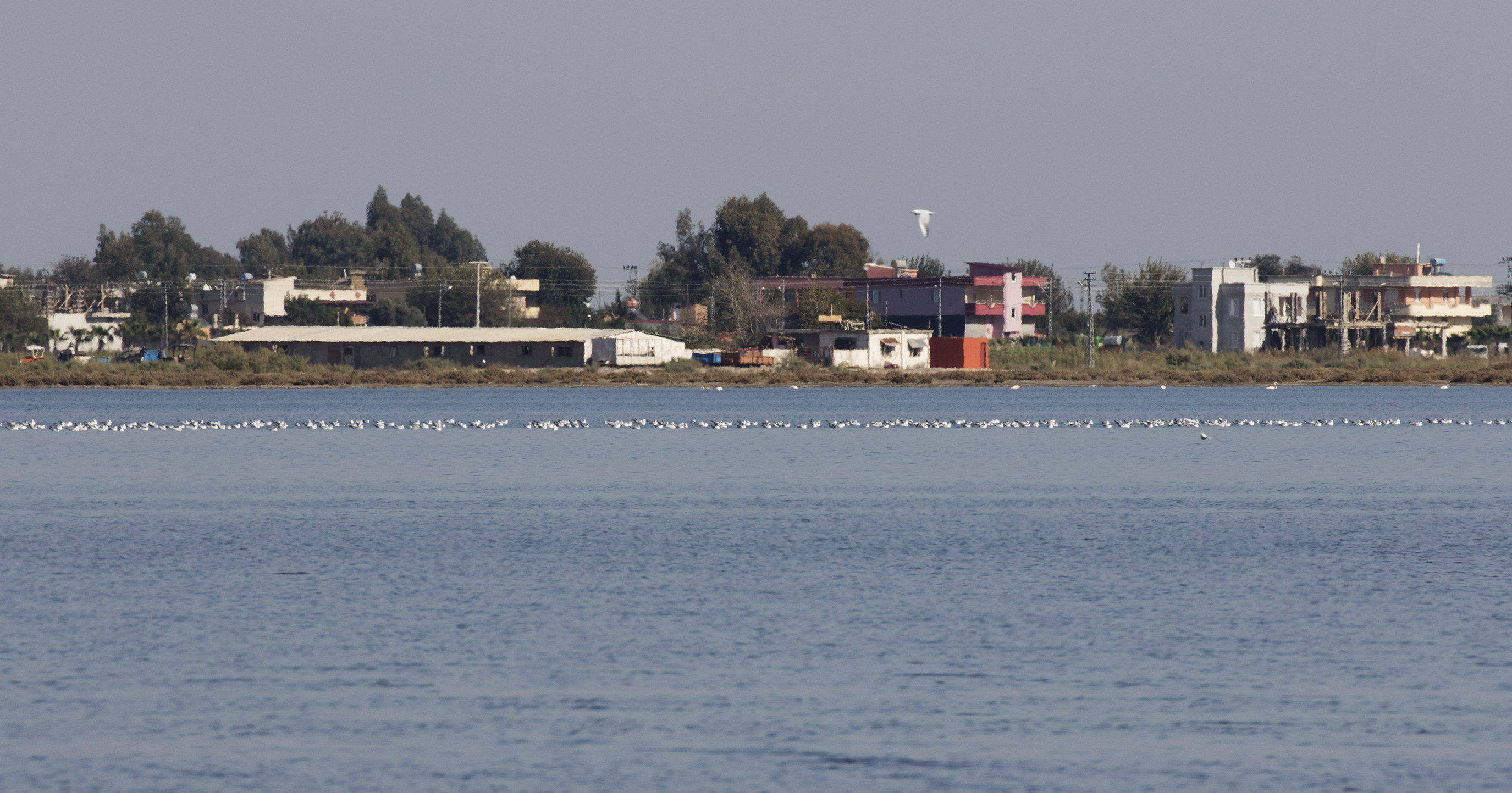
- A part of the lake

- Location within Turkey
- Interactive map of Lake Tuzla
- Location: Adana Province, Turkey
- Coordinates: 36°42′N 35°02′E
- Type: lagoon

Lake Tuzla (Turkish: Tuzla Gölü) is a lake in Karataş ilçe (district) of Adana Province. It is to the west of Akyatan Lagoon and to the east of Seyhan River. The mid point of the lake is at 36°42′N 35°02′E It is a typical lagoon separated from the Mediterranean Sea by a narrow strip. There are channels through the strip and the lake is used as a fish pond. Annual fish production is about 40 tonnes. The salinity of the lake fluctuates depending on the season.

== Fauna ==
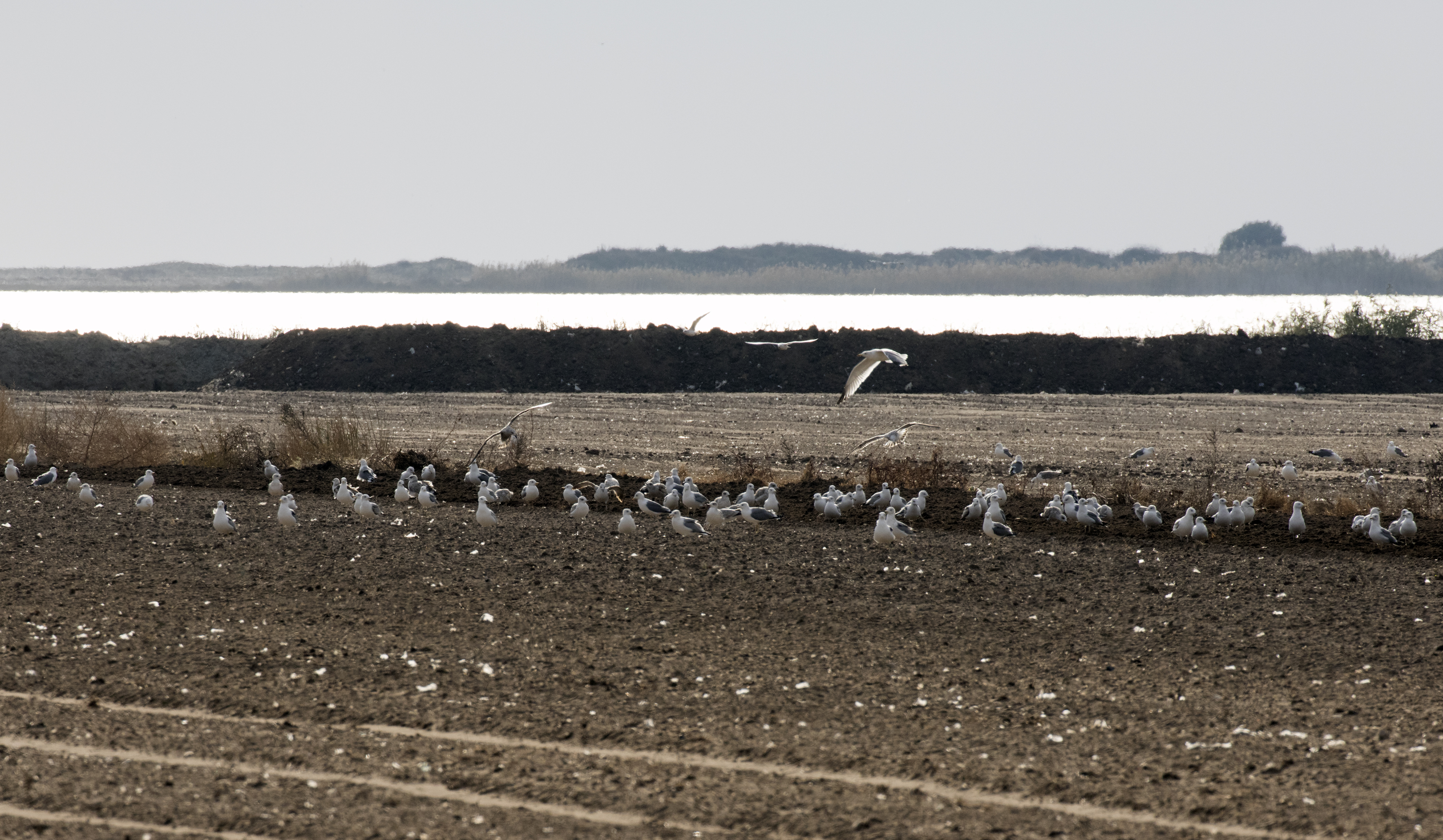
Flock of birds in Tuzla

The fauna of the lake is composed by various birds such as marbled duck, francolin, stone-curlew, little tern, kentish plover etc. During the winter flamingos also stay in the lake area. Jungle cat is the main predator of the lake.

The lake is a part of Wildlife conservation area which was founded in 1995.
