= Lake Batmış =

Lake in Turkey

- Location within Turkey
- Location: Adilcevaz, Bitlis Province, Turkey
- Coordinates: 38.891°N 42.649°E
- Lake type: Freshwater
- Basin countries: Turkey
- Surface area: 3,400 square kilometres (1,300 sq mi)
- Max. depth: 3.5 metres (11 ft)
- Surface elevation: 2.210 m (7 ft 3.0 in)

Lake Batmış (Turkish: Batmış Gölü); is a lake at the western foot of Süphan mountain.

The lake has been declared an area of definitive protection by the presidency.

== Natural history ==
It is an important wetland area for birds.
