= Lake Bolluk =

Freshwater Lake in Turkey

Lake Bolluk Bolluk Gölü
- Location of Lake Bolluk in Turkey.
- Coordinates: 38°32′25″N 32°56′34″E
- Basin countries: Turkey
- Surface area: 11.5 km^{2} (4 sq mi)
- Surface elevation: 940 m (3,080 ft)

Lake Bolluk is a lake in Turkey.

The lake is in Cihanbeyli ilçe (district) of Konya Province. It is situated to the east of the highway D.715, which connects Ankara to Silifke and to the west of Lake Tuz. The area of the lake is 11.5 square kilometres (4.4 sq mi). Its elevation with respect to sea level is 940 metres (3,080 ft). The hard water of the lake contains sodium. Recently, there are two threats to lake; the underground water level falls as a result of excessive irrigation and the creeks, which feed the lake, are polluted. World Water Forum Turkey conducts a project to protect the lake.

== Fauna ==
Slender billed gull, Mediterranean gull, gull-billed tern, greater sand plover, spoonbill, black-winged stilt, and avocet are the birds of the lake.
