= Beymelek Lagoon =

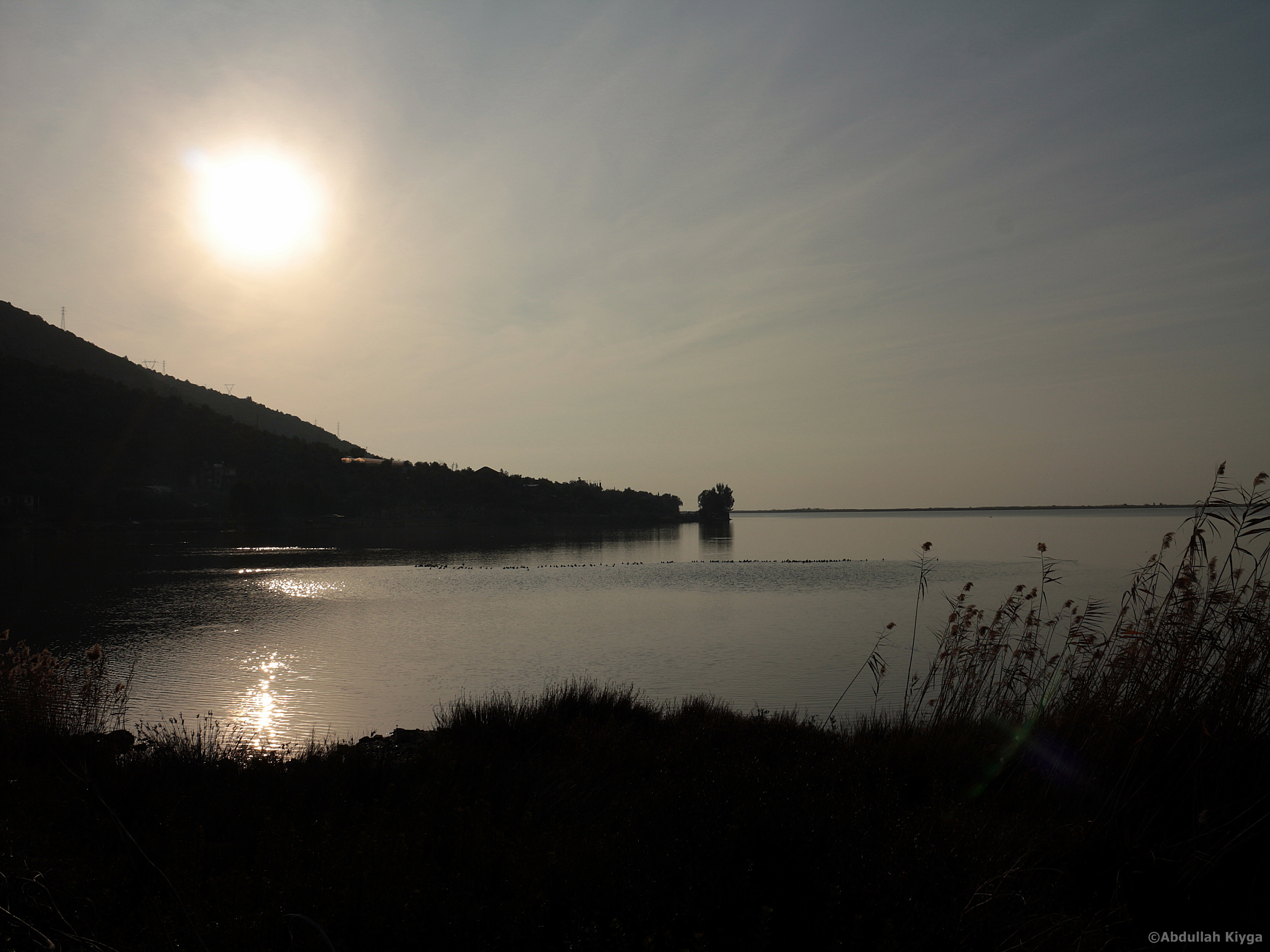
- A view of Beymelek Lagoon.

- Location within Turkey
- Coordinates: 36°16′N 30°03′E
- Type: Lagoon
- Basin countries: Turkey
- Surface area: 225 ha (560 acres)

Beymelek Lagoon (Turkish: Beymelek Lagünü) is a lagoon on the Mediterranean coast, which is used as a fishery, in Antalya Province, southwestern Turkey. It is named after the village of Beymelek, which is located to the west of the water body. The lagoon is situated in the Demre ilçe (district) of Antalya Province at coordinates 36°16′N 30°03′E.

The total area of the lagoon is about 225 ha (560 acres) excluding the land area. It contains 13 fish species.

The Beymelek Lagoon, located to the east of the Demre Delta, is formed by the accumulation of the alluvial deposits of Demre Creek in front of the Beymelek Bay through the coastal dynamics affected by the dominant south winds. The lake, fed with karstic resources, is independent of the Demre Creek's catchment, except for the southwestern delta area and coastline in today's conditions. The lagoon is fed by the Lake Kaynak, which covers an area of some 6 ha (15 acres) west of the lagoon and is connected to it with a narrow channel.

Applied fishing methods in the lagoon are fish trapping and gillnetting. Most caught fish species are gilt-head bream (Sparus aurata), thicklip grey mullet (Chelon labrosus), European seabass (Dicentrarchus labrax), flathead grey mullet (Mugil cephalus), thinlip mullet (Chelon ramada), sand steenbras (Lithognathus mormyrus), white grouper (Epinephelus aeneus) and sargo (Diplodus sargus), as well as blue crab (Portunus pelagicus). Average fishing Catch efficiency is given with 21.3 kg fish per hectare.

Endangered turtle species loggerhead sea turtle (Caretta caretta) is also under protection in the fishery. The fishery is also a sanctuary for 20 bird species.
