= Lake Yay =

Lake in Turkey

Lake Yay Yay Gölü
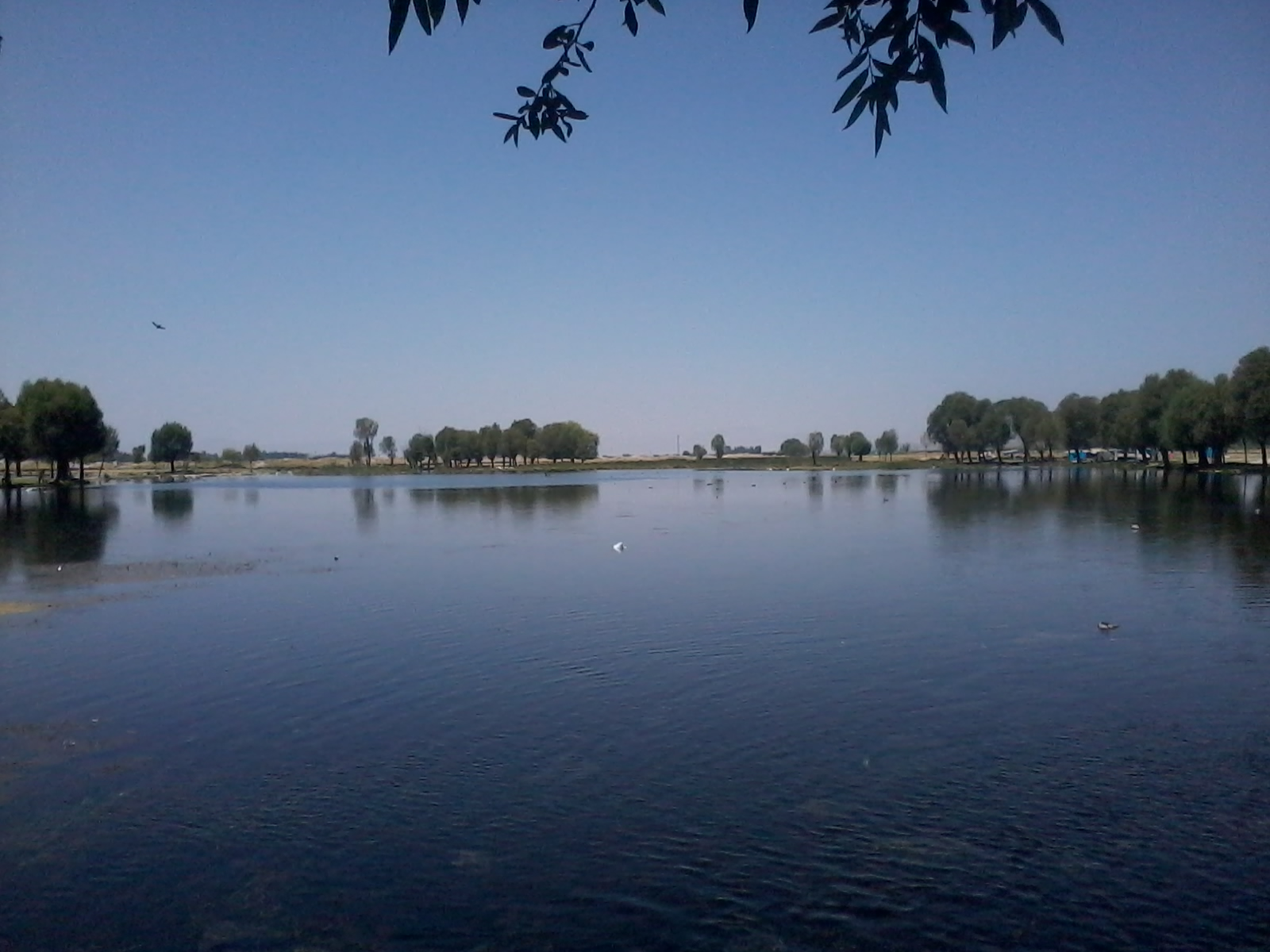
- A view of Lake Yay

- Location of Lake Yay in Turkey.
- Coordinates: 38°19′51″N 35°16′51″E
- Type: saline lake
- Basin countries: Turkey
- Surface area: 20 km^{2} (8 sq mi)
- Average depth: 2 m (6.6 ft)
- Surface elevation: 1,071 m (3,514 ft)

Lake Yay (Turkish: Yay Gölü) is a saline lake in Kayseri Province, central Turkey. It is situated in the rural area of Develi ilçe (district).

== Description ==
The lake is the biggest in the Sultan Reedy National Park. The midpoint is at about 38°20′N 35°17′E. The elevation of its surface level is at 1,071 m (3,514 ft) above mean seas level. It is a shallow lake with an average depth of only 2 m (6.6 ft).

Its average surface area is about 20 km^{2} (7.7 sq mi). While it covers a much wider surface during the rainy season, its area fluctuates and it mostly dries up in the summer season. When at low ebb, salt is produced in the lake bed.
