= Lake Aygır (Trabzon) =

Lake in Turkey

- Location within Turkey
- Location: Çaykara, Trabzon Province
- Coordinates: 40.5265°N 40.3905°E
- Lake type: Freshwater, glacial lake
- Basin countries: Turkey
- Surface area: 3.75 km^{2} (1.45 sq mi)
- Surface elevation: 2.740 m (8 ft 11.9 in)

Lake Aygır (Turkish: Aygır Gölü) is a lake in the Çaykara district of Trabzon province.

== Geology and geomorphology ==
Aygır Lake is a glacial lake at an altitude of 2740 meters at the foot of the Haldizen Mountains.
