= Göksu Delta =

River delta at the confluence of the Göksu River with the Mediterranean Sea

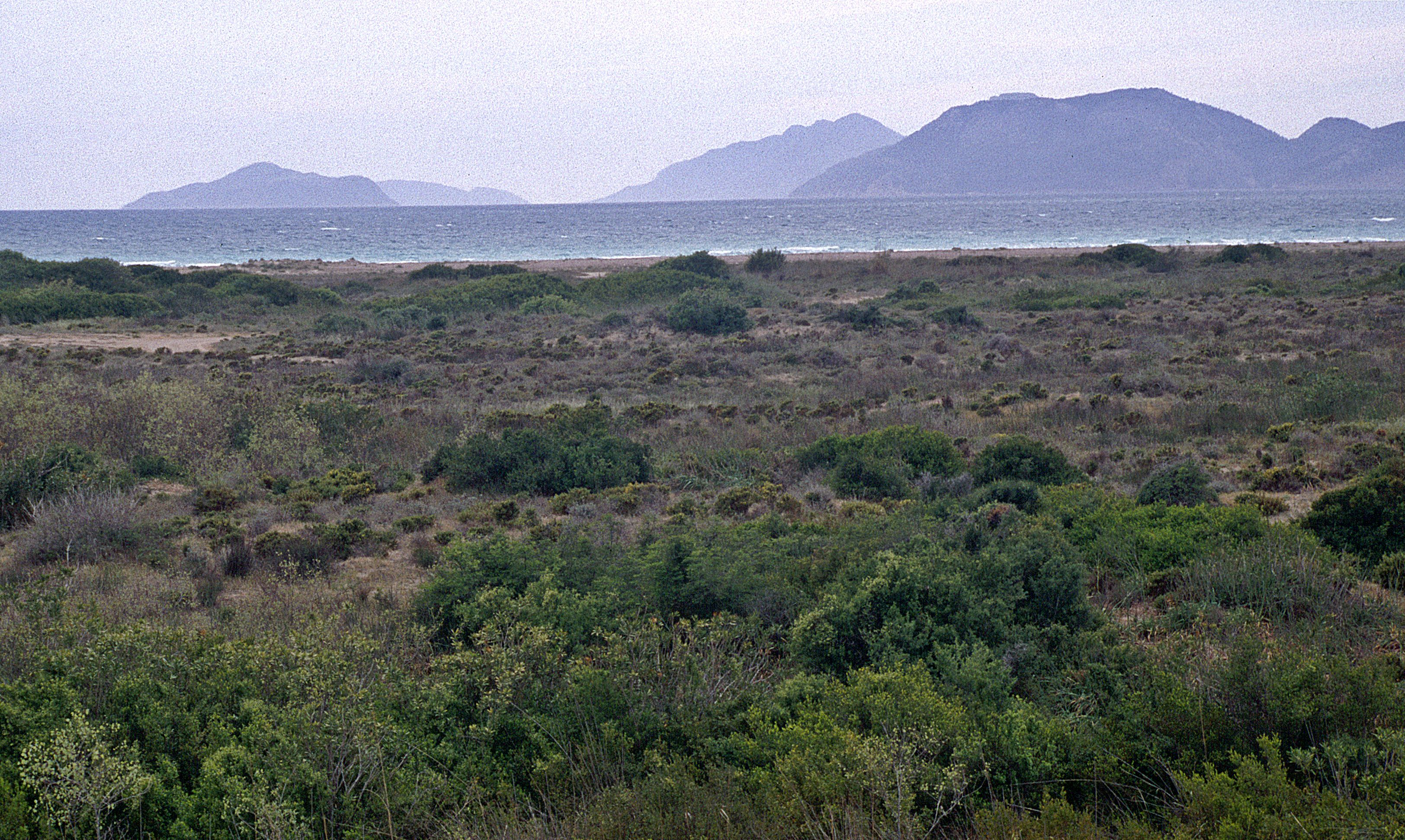

- Location within Turkey
- Location: Mersin Province, Turkey
- Nearest city: Silifke
- Coordinates: 36°17′N 33°59′E
- Area: 15,000 ha (58 sq mi)
- Governing body: Ministry of Agriculture and Forestry

Ramsar Wetland
- Official name: Göksu Delta
- Designated: 13 July 1994
- Reference no.: 657

The Göksu Delta is the river delta at the confluence of the Göksu River with the Mediterranean Sea, in Mersin Province in southern Turkey. It is a 15,000 ha area of land that occupies coastal part of Silifke district. It is one of the largest areas of coastal wetlands in Turkey and has a biodiversity of plants and birds. It is a Ramsar site since 1994 and an Important Bird Area since 2004.

== Geography ==
The Göksu Delta has an area of 15,000 ha and occupies coastal part of Silifke district. It includes Lake Akgöl, Paradeniz Lagoon, Lake Kuğu and Lake Arapalanı.

== Flora and fauna ==
The delta is home to 332 bird species and 384 taxa.
