= Lake Kömüşini =

Lake in Turkey

- Kömüşini Gölü (Turkish)
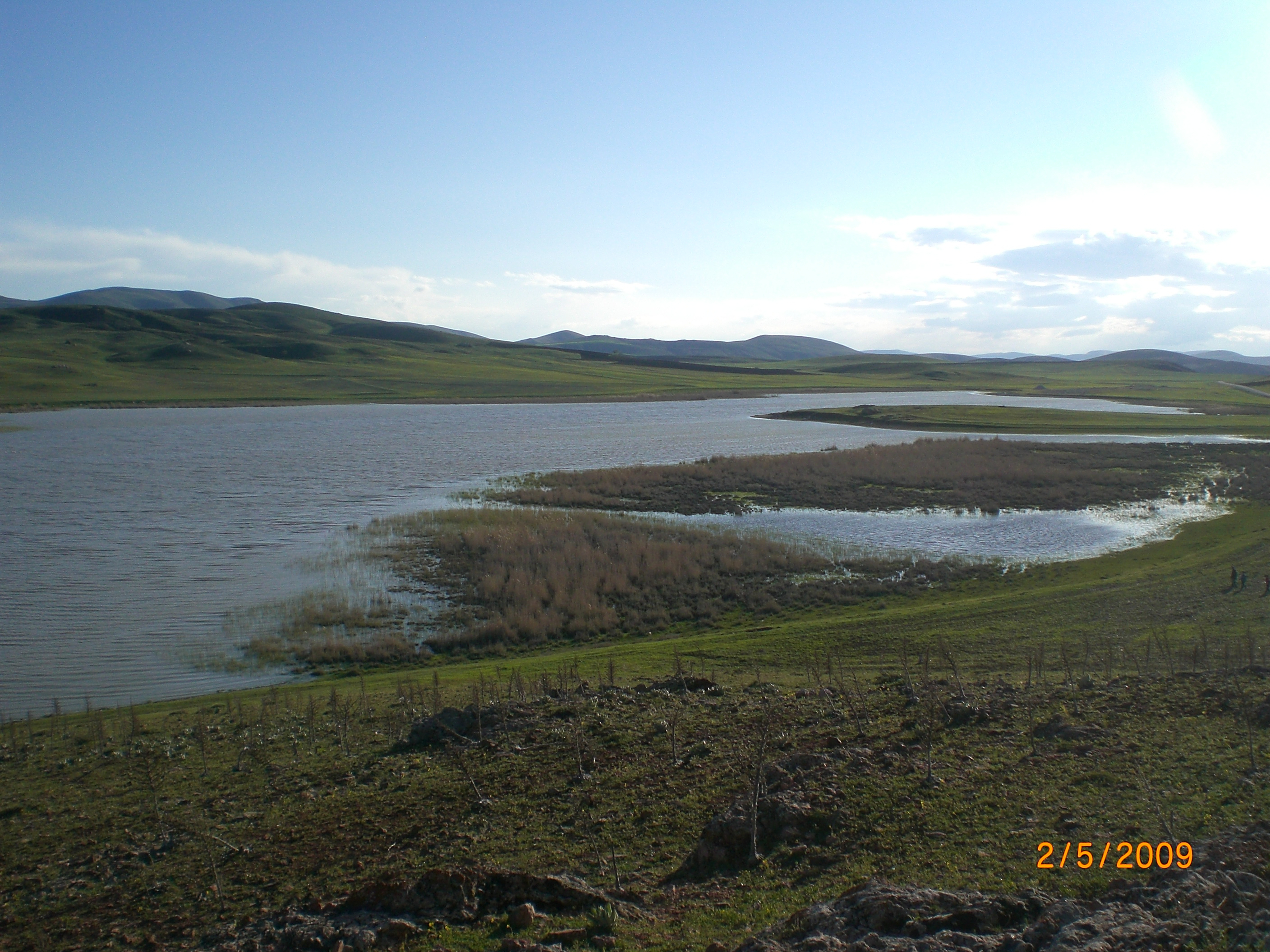
- Lake Kömüşini

- Location of the lake in Turkey.
- Location: Konya Province, Turkey
- Coordinates: 39°14′24″N 32°55′32″E
- Basin countries: Turkey
- Surface area: 15 km^{2} (5.8 sq mi)
- Average depth: 1.50 m (4 ft 11 in)
- Surface elevation: 1,200 m (3,900 ft)

Lake Kömüşini, also known as Lake Uyuz, (Turkish: Kömüşini Gölu or Uyuz Gölü)'(Kurdish Anatolian:Gola Gûrî)is a freshwater lake in Konya Province, Turkey.

The lake is located in Kömüşini village to the north of Kulu ilçe (district) in Konya Province, central Turkey. Its distance to Kulu is 34 km (21 mi) and to Konya 180 km (110 mi). The lake covers an area of about 15 square kilometres (5.8 sq mi) and is elevation with respect to sea level is 1,200 metres (3,900 ft). Lake Kömüşini is a shallow lake with a maximum depth of 1.50 m (4 ft 11 in). It is fed by groundwater.

The shores of the lake are covered with reeds. Wheat fields surround the lake. The lake is an important breeding place for waders. It is a habitat for black-necked grebe, ferruginous duck and coot. It host also diverse bird species during the migration periods.

The lake and its surroundings were granted a special protected area status due to the population of world-wide endangered species white-headed duck, which breeds here. In 1992, the site was declared a nature protected area.

The reed fields around the lake suffers from the frequent fires of obscure origin. A bush fire completely devastated the reeds in 2005.
