= Lake Palas Tuzla =

Lake Palas Tuzla Palas Tuzla Gölü
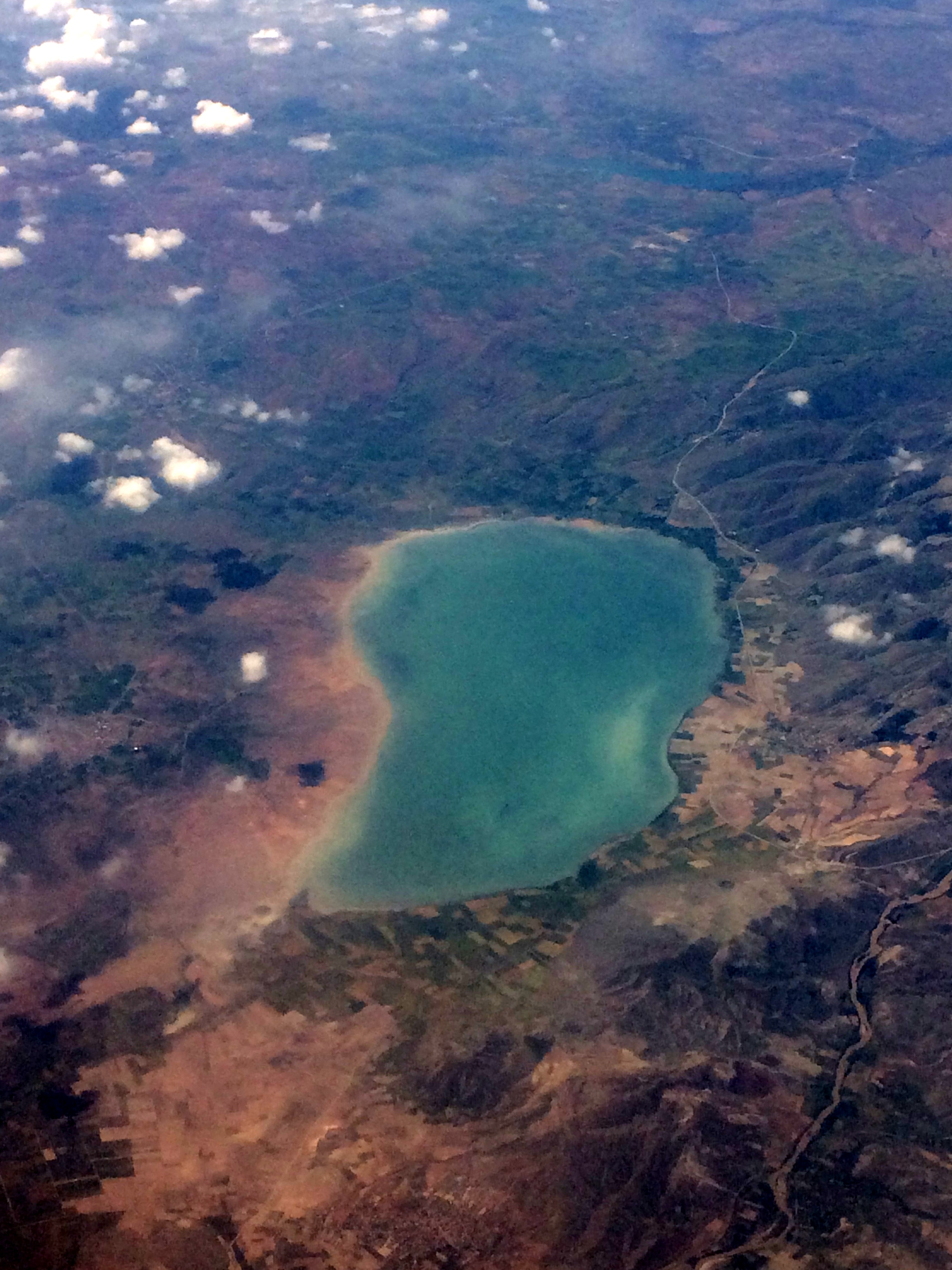
- Aerial view of Lake Palas Tuzla.

- Location of Lake Palas Tuzla in Turkey.
- Coordinates: 39°01′N 35°48′E
- Type: saline lake
- Basin countries: Turkey
- Surface area: 25 km^{2} (10 sq mi)
- Surface elevation: 1,054 m (3,458 ft)

Lake Palas Tuzla (Turkish: Palas Tuzla Gölü) is a saline lake in Kayseri Province, central Turkey. It is a registered natural protected area.

The lake is situated in the Palas neighborhood of Sarıoğlan district in Kayseri province. It is 60 km (37 mi) away from the city of Kayseri. The lake is at the center of a closed basin. Its elevation is 1,054 m (3,458 ft) above mean sea level. The surface area is 25–35 km^{2} (9.7–13.5 sq mi). It is fed by five creeks. During the dry season, the lake basin is covered by a 10 cm (4 in) layer of salt. The lake is the site of a salt works.

The surrounding area of the lake is a wetland, which is located on bird migration routes and habitat of some endemic flora. The wetland was declared a natural protected area of first degree on June 26, 2009.
