= Lake Karataş =

Lake in Burdur Province, Turkey

- Karataş Gölü (Turkish)
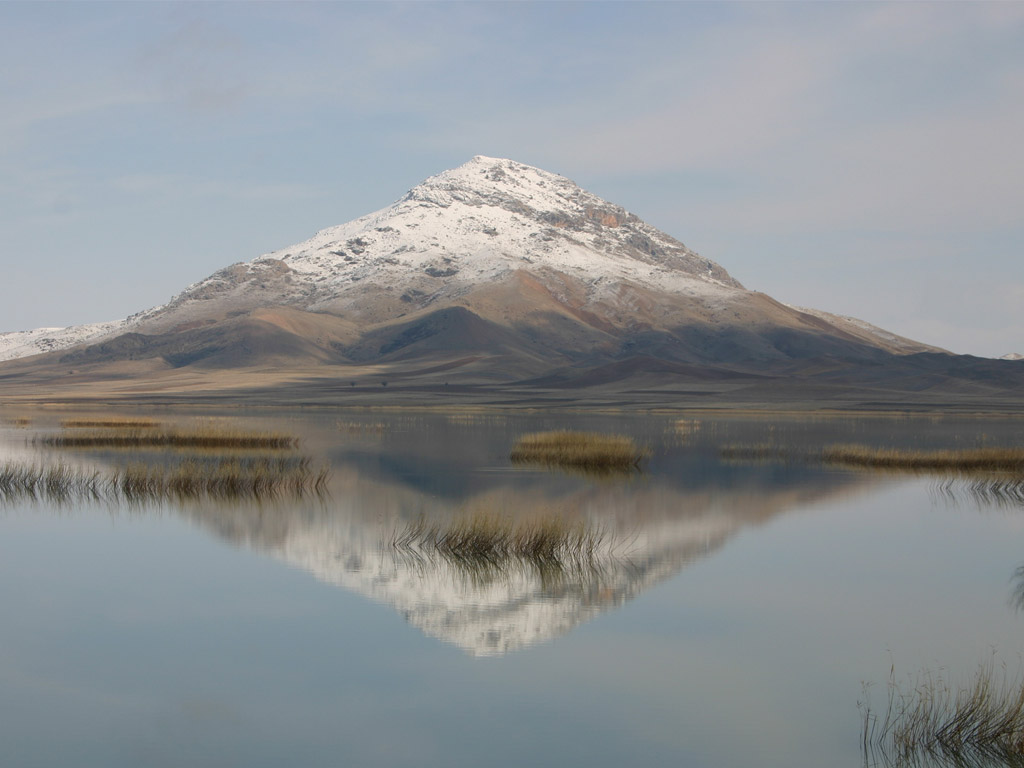

- Location of Lake Karataş in Burdur Province, Turkey.
- Location: Karamanlı, Burdur Province, Turkey
- Coordinates: 37°23′N 29°58′E
- Primary inflows: Bademli creek, Akçay creek
- Basin countries: Turkey
- Max. length: 7 km (4.3 mi)
- Surface area: 1,090 ha (2,700 acres)

Lake Karataş (Turkish: Karataş Gölü), also known as Lake Bahçeözü, is a fresh water lake in Burdur Province, Turkey.

The lake is situated in Karamanlı ilçe (district) of Burdur Province at 37°23′N 29°58′E. It is a shallow lake with a surface area of. 1,190 ha (2,900 acres). Its north to south dimension is 7 km (4.3 mi). It is a part of the closed basin known as Göller Yöresi ("Turkish Lakes Region") . Its distance to Karamanlı is 16 km (9.9 mi) and to Burdur is 46 km (29 mi). Its elevation with respect to sea level is 1,050 m (3,440 ft). The main bird species of the lake are Eurasian wigeon, grey heron, white heron, pochard, teal, and black-tailed godwit.
