= Mount Süphan =

Volcano in Turkey

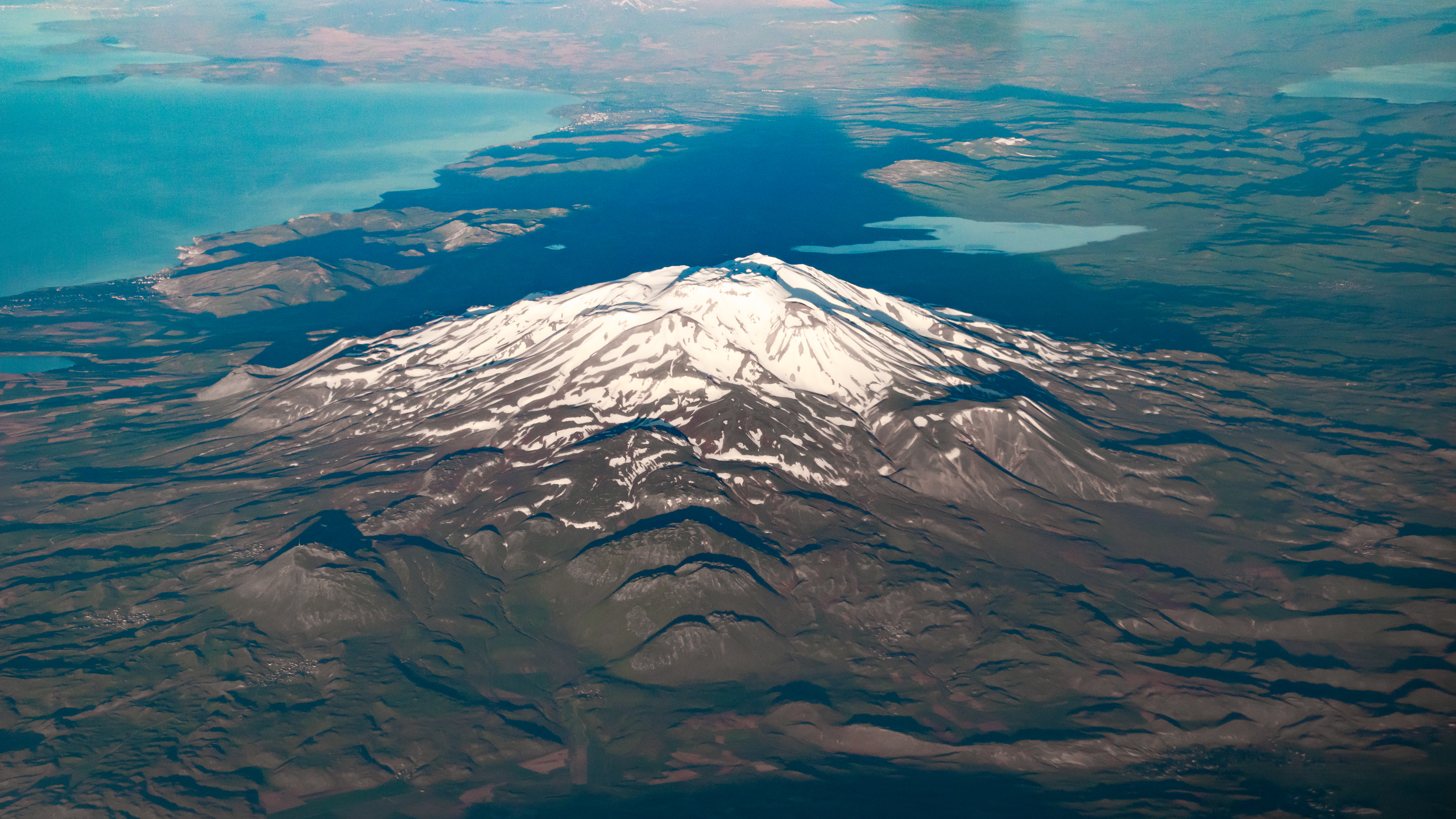
- Mount Süphan in June 2024

Highest point
- Elevation: 4,058 m (13,314 ft)
- Prominence: 2,189 m (7,182 ft)
- Isolation: 151.16 km (93.93 mi)
- Listing: Ultra
- Coordinates: 38°55′48″N 42°49′48″E

Geography
- Location within Turkey
- Location: Adilcevaz, Bitlis and Patnos, Ağrı, Turkey
- Parent range: East Anatolia Plateaus

Geology
- Rock age: Holocene
- Mountain type: Stratovolcano
- Last eruption: Pleistocene

Mount Süphan (Turkish: Süphan Dağı; Kurdish: Sîpanê Xelatê; Armenian: Սիփան, romanized: Sipan) is a stratovolcano located in eastern Turkey, immediately north of Lake Van. It is the second highest volcano in Turkey, with an elevation of 4,058 metres (13,314 feet), and has the third highest prominence of the Armenian Highlands, after Mount Ararat (5,137 m) and Mount Aragats (4,090 m).

== Geography ==
The Yalnız Ağaç or Lonely Tree is the only tree on Süphan Mountain and is located at the southern foot of the mountain and north of Lake Aygır. Lonely Tree is at 38°51′31.2768″N 42°49′16.4136″E. Mount Süphan is 60 to 70 kilometers (37 to 43.5 miles) northwest of the city of Van and around 153 kilometers southeast of Mount Ararat

The mountain has two peaks, east and west, separated by a 1.5 km-wide basin; there are two small lakes in this basin. The eastern summit is much larger in area and consists of "a wide snow-covered platform of cairn-like bare rock peaks". From here, the whole northern shore of Lake Van is visible, along with Mount Ararat, the Murat river plain, and even the Palandöken mountain south of Erzurum. The smaller western summit has fields of lava boulders. A narrow ridge connects the two peaks. All sides of the mountain are marked by lava "ribs". The slope is fairly gentle on all sides except the north.

== History ==
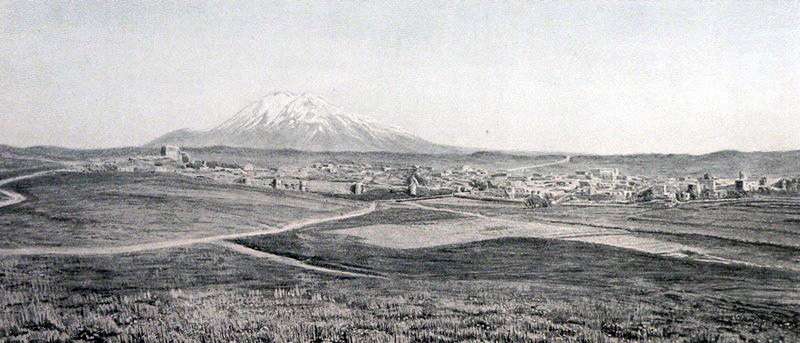
View of the city of Malazgirt and Mount Süphan from the north, 1901

The remains of the small Urartian fort of Kefirkalesi are located on the southwest slope at a height of 2400 m. This was probably never intended to have a permanent garrison and was mostly to keep local nomadic groups in check. Today, there are a few small villages along the mountain's lower slopes. About 1.5 km west of the village of Harmantepe (formerly Norsunçuk), there is also an ancient cemetery with urns that may have once contained cremated remains.

== Gallery ==
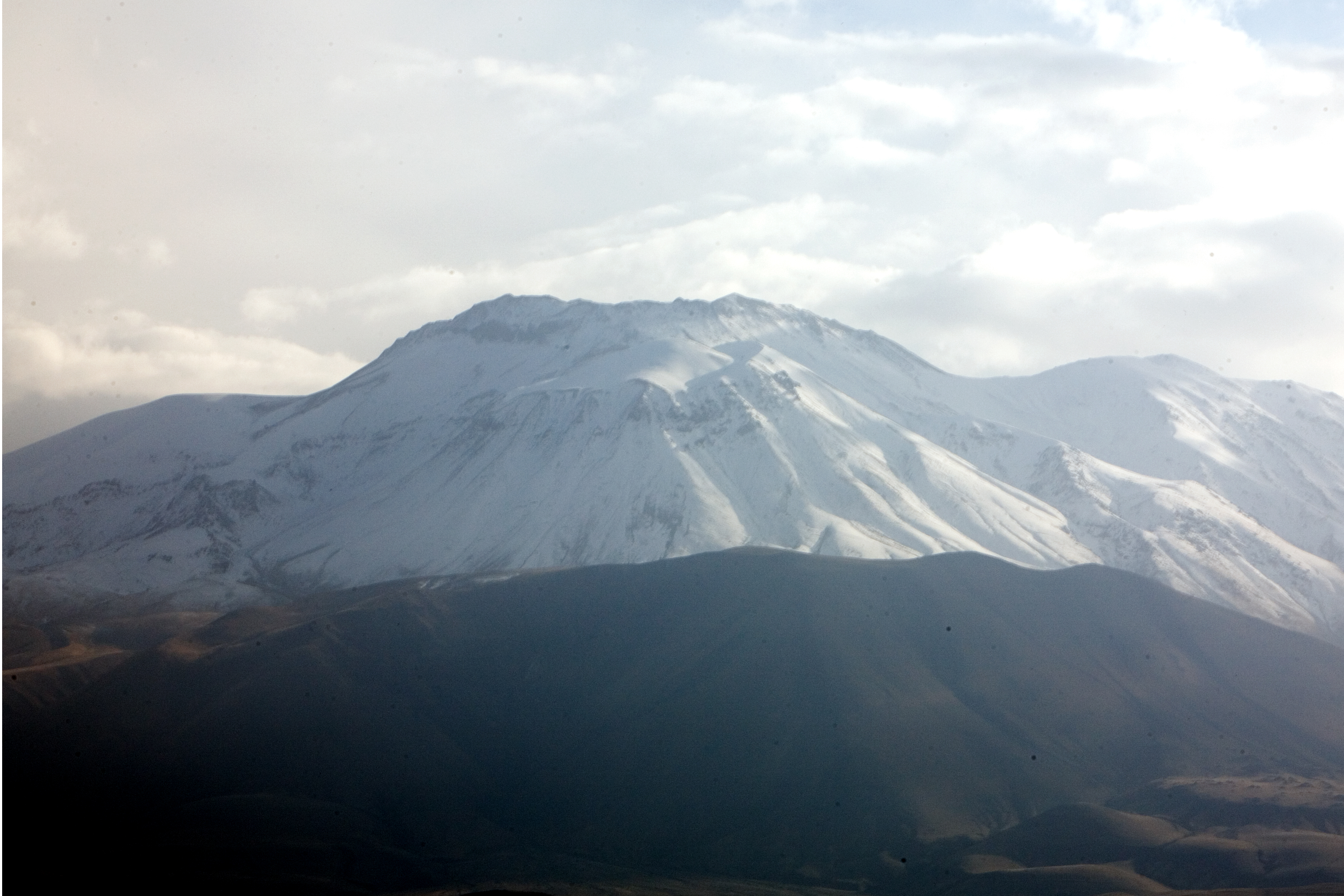
Mount Süphan in October 2007

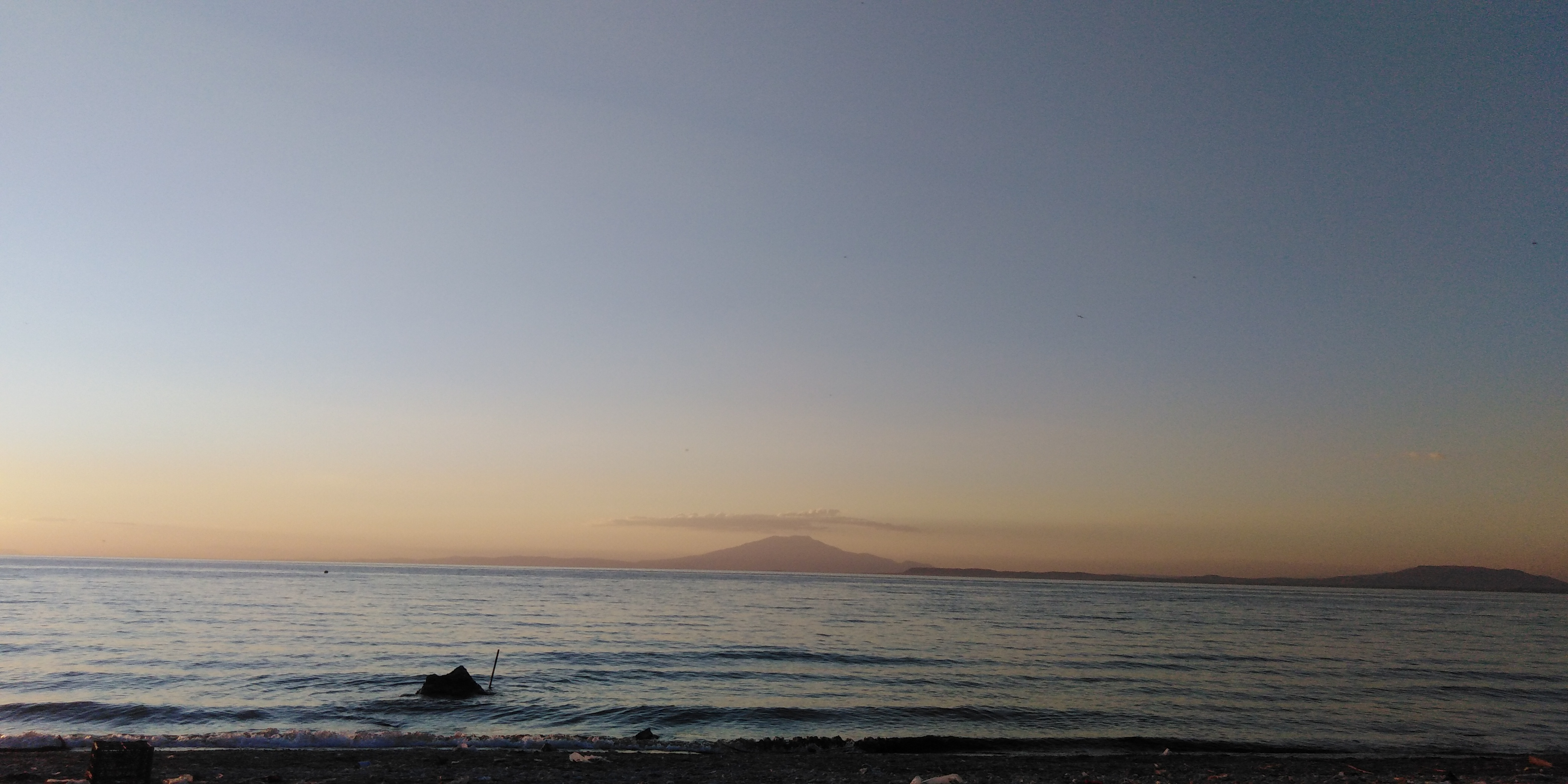
Mount Süphan and Lake Van

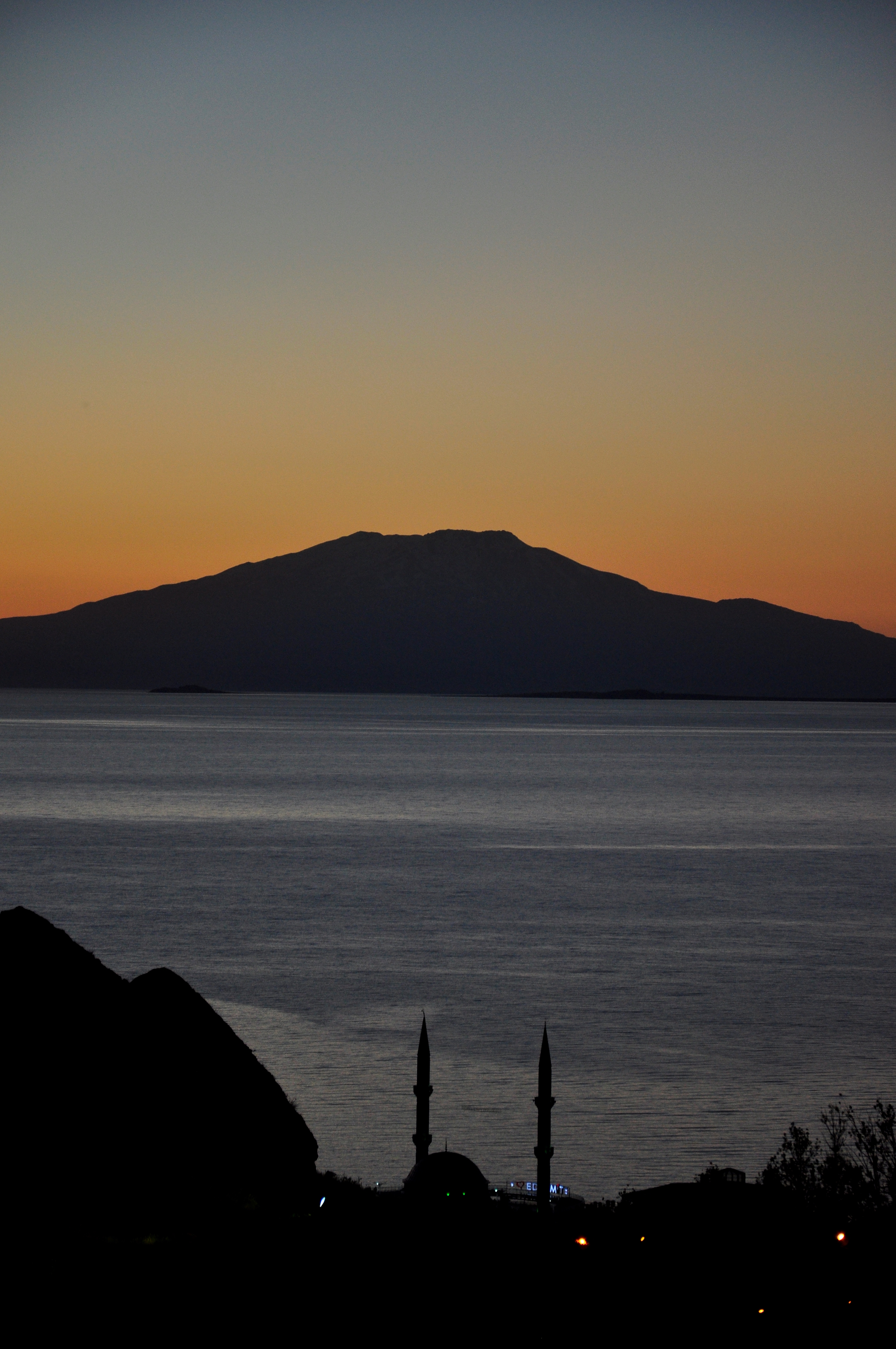
Süphan mountain at sunset in Edremit district

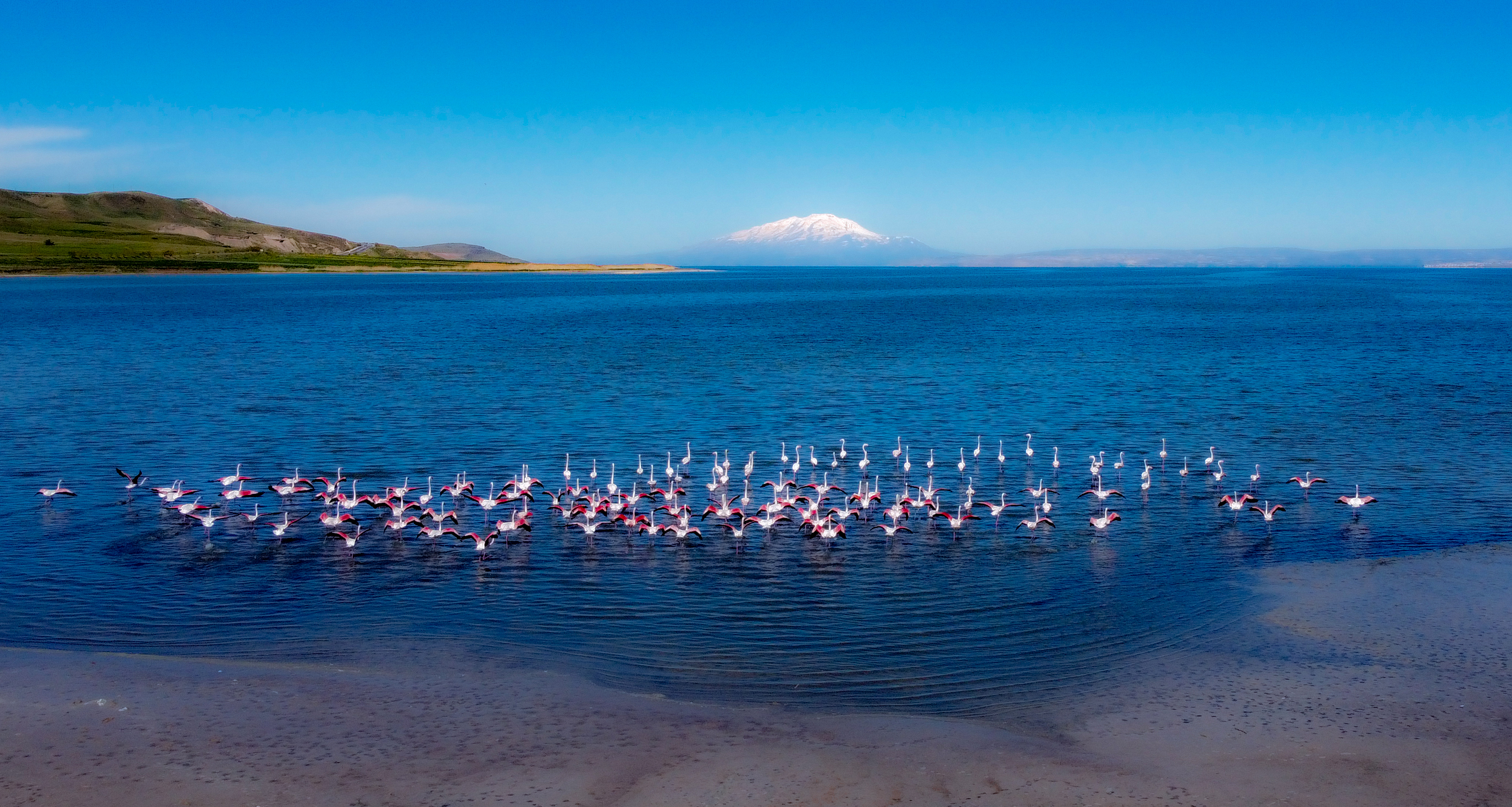
Süphan and flamingos

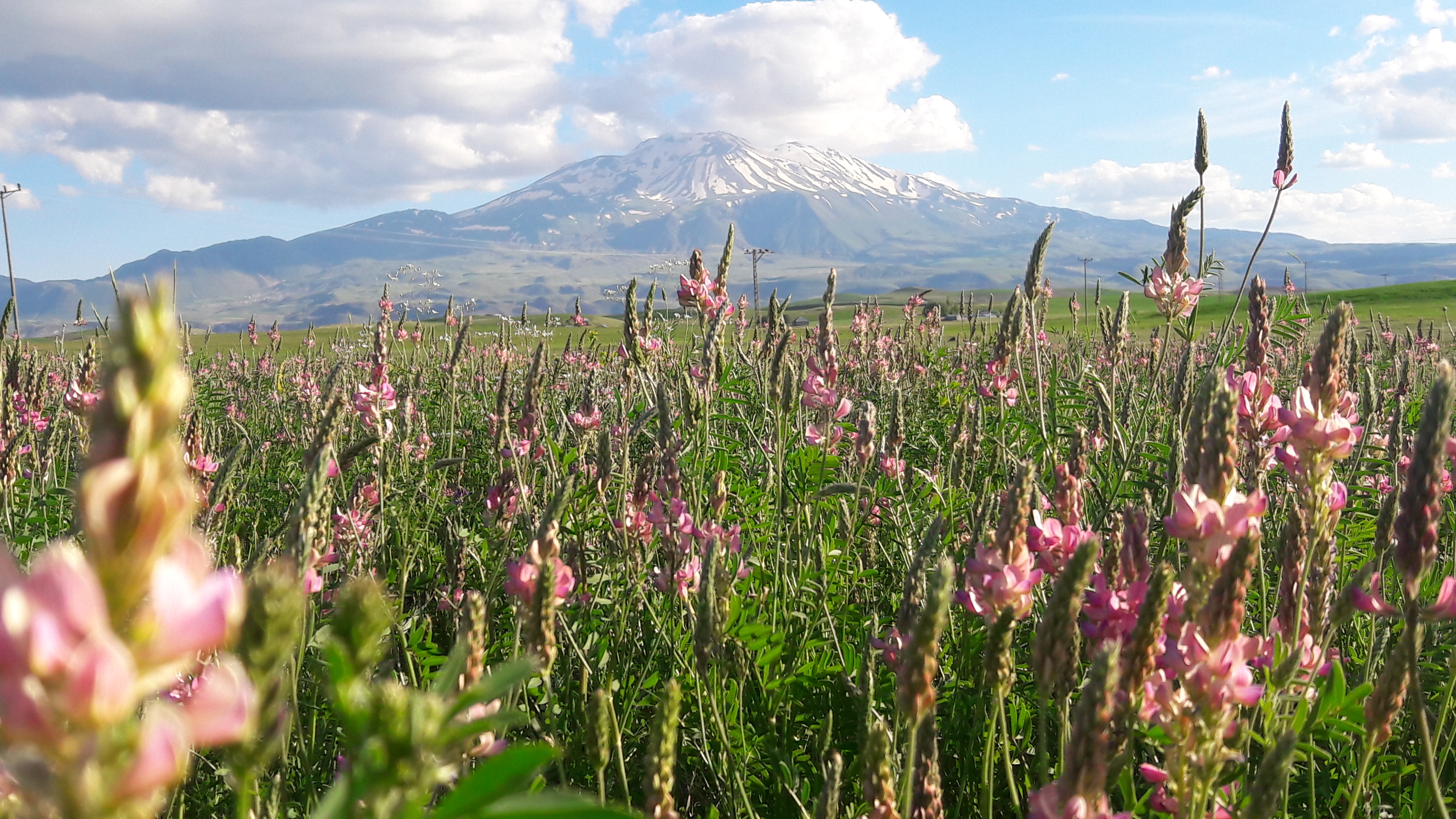
View of Mount Süphan from Patnos

== See also ==
- List of ultras of West Asia
- List of volcanoes in Turkey
- Mount Nemrut
- Bilican Mountains
- Mount Göztepe
- Akdoğan Mountains
- Bingöl Mountains
