= Lake Çöl =

Lake in Turkey

Lake Çöl Çöl Gölü
- Location of Lake Çöl in Turkey.
- Coordinates: 39°18′N 32°54′E
- Basin countries: Turkey
- Surface area: 15 km^{2} (6 sq mi)
- Surface elevation: 1,045 m (3,428 ft)

Lake Çöl (Turkish: Çöl Gölü, literally "Desert lake") is a hard water lake in Turkey.

== Location ==
The lake is in Haymana and Bala ilçes (districts) of Ankara Province at 39°18′N 32°54′E. Its birds flight distance to Ankara is about 60 kilometres (37 mi) and its altitude with respect to sea level is about 1,045 metres (3,428 ft). It is situated in a closed basin and fed by a few small creeks. It is a shallow lake and the surface area fluctuates. During the rainy seasons its area is about 15 square kilometres (5.8 sq mi).

== Fauna ==
The lake is the home or breeding area of many birds. Kentish plover, lesser short-toed lark, lesser kestrel, crane, gull-billed tern and great bustard are among the common birds of the lake . According to pre-1990 figures the number of birds of the lake exceeds 76,000.It has been speculated that the short wave transmitter station of Turkish Radio and Television Corporation which is situated north of the lake may reduce this number. Small skipper is the common butterfly around the lake area.

== Economy of the area ==
The area around the lake is salty. There are steps to the north of the lake and agricultural lands further to the north. The main products are cereal. In the plains around the lake, bovine and, in the hills, sheep are the common livestock.
