= Haldizen Mountains =

Mountain range in Turkey

Coordinates: 40.564°N 40.377°E

Haldizen Mountains are a mountain range in north eastern Turkey, Trabzon. They are part of the Pontic Alps. The highest peaks stretch along the Trabzon-Bayburt border and are Demirkapı 3,376 m (11,076 ft), Kayışkıran 3,156 m (10,354 ft) and Karakaya 3,139 m (10,299 ft). The word haldizen is of Laz origin.
