= Lake Durusu =

- Lake Terkos
- Location within Turkey
- Location: Istanbul Province, Turkey
- Coordinates: 41°20′N 28°34′E
- Type: lake
- Surface area: 39 square kilometres (15 sq mi)
- Max. depth: 11 metres (36 ft)
- Surface elevation: 4.5 metres (15 ft)

Lake Durusu (also called Lake Terkos or Targus) is a lake in Thrace region of Turkey. It would be eliminated by the planned Istanbul Canal.

== Description ==
The lake lies in İstanbul Province. The midpoint of the lake is at about 41°20′N 28°34′E. It is situated to the north west of Istanbul and its distance to the city is 40 kilometres (25 mi). Its elevation with respect to sea level is about 4.5 metres (15 ft) and its maximum depth is 11 metres (36 ft). The surface area is 39 square kilometres (15 sq mi). Depending on the rainfall, this lake with a 162 million m^{3} of the water potential satisfies approximately 20% of the water needs of Istanbul and surrounding settlements.

Lake Durusu was originally a lagoon and it is separated from the Black Sea coast by a 700 metres (2,300 ft) wide strip. Currently there is no connection to the sea and it is a fresh water lake fed by a number of creeks the most important one being the Istrance creek. The drainage basin is 619 square kilometres (239 sq mi).

The annual water supply capacity of the lake is 162×10^{6} cubic metres (5.7×10^{9} cu ft).

== History ==
It is known that the history of village where the lake is located is about 900 years old. The area around the lake was a pirates' settlement in the medieval ages. A monastery named Trikos was built by the Genoese. In the 19th century the lake was used as the main water source of Istanbul. In 1868 the concession of the lake and its environment was granted to an Ottoman - French company.

== Facilities ==
In order to solve the water problem of Istanbul in the 19th century, samples had been taken from here. The researches showed that lake Durusu is a drinking water source. So, facilities were built for paying the water needs in this region. Thus, part one fifth of İstanbul inhabitants use this lake for drinking water.
