= Lake Dil =

- Karine Lagoon, Karine Lagünü
- Dil Gölü (Turkish)
- Location within Turkey
- Location: Aegean Region, Turkey
- Coordinates: 37°34′N 27°12′E
- Type: lagoon

Lake Dil, a.k.a. Karine Lagoon, (Turkish: Dil Gölü or Karine Lagünü) is a lagoon in the Aegean Region of Turkey.

It is situated to the north of Büyük Menderes River delta in Söke ilçe (district) of Aydın Province at 37°34′N 27°12′E It is in the Dilek National Park and separated from the Aegean Sea by a narrow strip of about 100 metres (330 ft). Being a lagoon it is used as a fishery. Its surface area is more than 4 square kilometres (1.5 sq mi). Doğanbey is the only settlement on the coast of the lake.

There are also smaller lagoons to the south of Dil. Their names are Arapça, Tuzla, Mavi, Kokar, Koca and Bölme.
