= Turkish Lakes region =

Region of Turkey

The Turkish Lake District or Turkish Lakeland (Turkish: Göller Yöresi) is an area with a series of shallow tectonic lakes within the folds of the Taurus Mountains in Southwestern Anatolia, Turkey

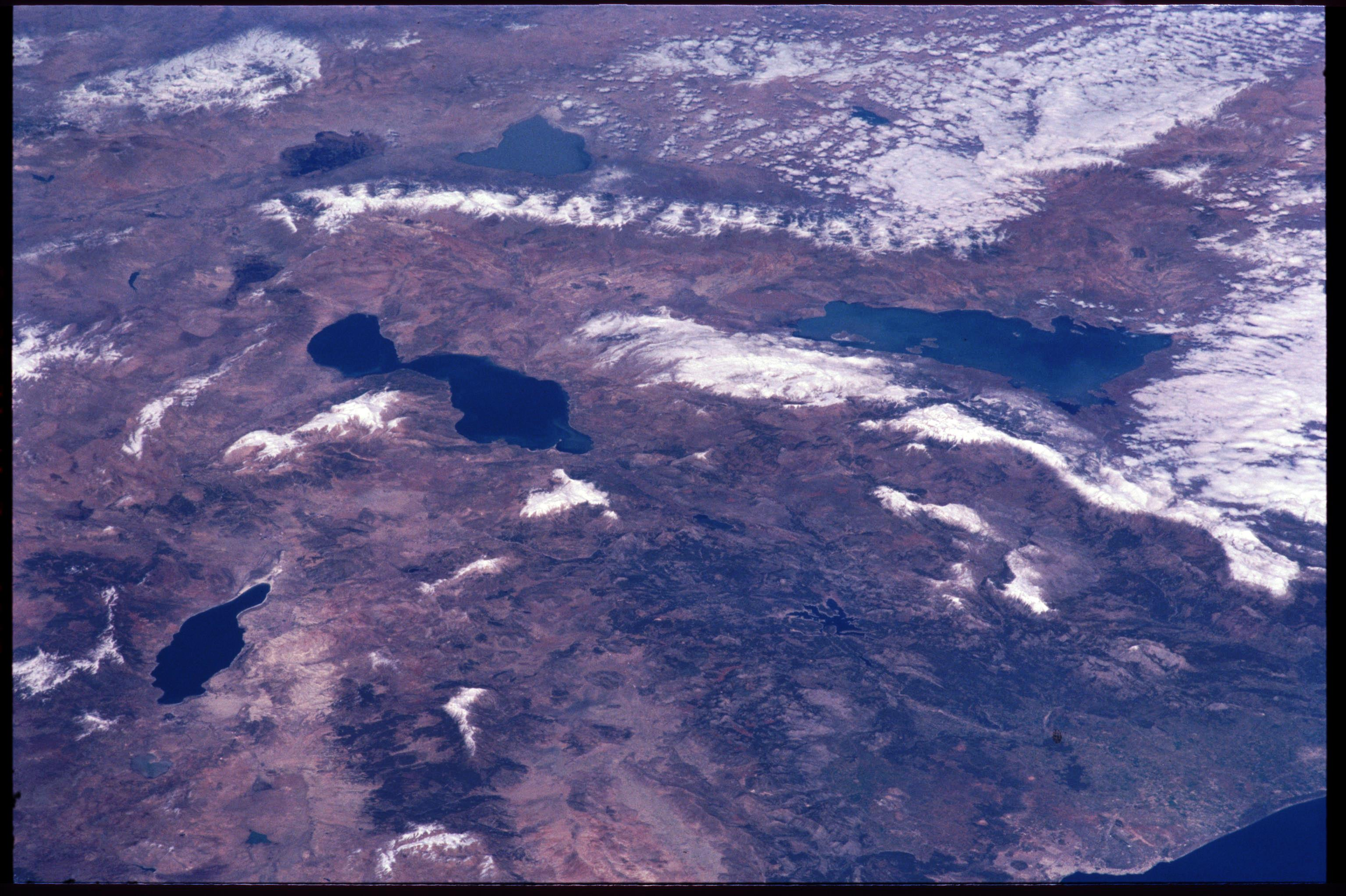
Image of the Turkish Lakes region from the International Space Station

The major lakes are Acıgöl, Akşehir, Beyşehir, Burdur, Eğirdir, and the smaller ones are Akgöl, Lake Çavuşçu (Ilgın), Eber, Işıklı (Çivril), Karamık, Karataş, Kovada, Salda, Suğla and Yarışlı.
