= Lake Akyayan =

- Akyayan
- Coordinates: 36°36′N 35°31′E
- Type: lagoon
- Basin countries: Turkey

Lake Akyayan is a lagoon in Turkey.

Lake Akyayan lies in Karataş ilçe (district) of Adana Province at about 36°36′N 35°31′E. It is separated from the Mediterranean coast by a thin strip. Its east to west dimension is about 6 kilometres (3.7 mi). It is a shallow lake and at times connected both to sea and to Ceyhan River which is to the east of the lake. Thus the salinity of the lake is low. The lake environment is rich in fauna But the sand movement threatens the lagoon and the marine fauna is affected. Thus 1,700 hectares (4,200 acres) of land around the lagoon will be afforested by the Ministry of Forestry.
