= Lake Bahri =

Lake in Turkey

- Location within Turkey
- Location: Karlıova, Bingöl Province
- Coordinates: 39.304°N 41.14205°E
- Lake type: Freshwater
- Basin countries: Turkey
- Surface area: 1,150 km^{2} (440 sq mi)
- Surface elevation: 1.986 m (6 ft 6.2 in)

Lake Bahri (Turkish: Bahri Gölü); is a lake in the Karlıova district of Bingöl province.

== Geography ==
Lake Bahri, is located 11 kilometers east of Karlıova. It is the largest lake in Bingöl province. It feeds self presence with snow and bottom waters.
