= Akyatan Lagoon =

Wetland ecosystem

- Location within Turkey
- Location: Çukurova, Turkey
- Nearest city: Adana
- Coordinates: 36°37′00″N 35°16′00″E
- Area: 147 km^{2} (57 sq mi)
- Established: 1987

Ramsar Wetland
- Designated: 15 April 1998
- Reference no.: 943: MPA Global category: Marine MPA, Intertidal MAP

Akyatan Lagoon is a 14700-hectare wetland ecosystem that is designated as Wetland of International Importance by Ramsar Convention. A major stopover for migrating birds, Akyatan is recognized as an Important Bird Area by BirdLife International. It is the single largest green turtle rookery at the Mediterranean, holding 43% of the Mediterranean nesting population.

The lagoon is located at the northeastern edge of Mediterranean Sea, 30 km south of the city of Adana, in Cilicia region of Turkey. The entrance to the lagoon is either from Tuzla or through Küçük Karataş Village.

== Geology ==
Akyatan lake and the lagoons were formed during the 4th era (10,000 years ago) when water levels at the Mediterranean started changing. As the rivers that make up the delta flooded, a large swamp came into being at the location where there is Akyatan lake. The swamp then disconnected from the sea and took its shape today with the sand brought by the waves that formed a cord. It is a typical alluvial dam lake.

With the decrease in the amount of water that feeds the lake and with high levels of evaporation, the area of the lake shrinks during summer. At the dried areas, mud surfaces form and by the end of summer the lake completely dries. Mud surfaces are seen especially at the west and northeast part of the lake. Around Kapı village, some islets reach the land.

The lake has a connection to the sea through a 2 km narrow canal on the southwest side. There is a flow of water from the canal to the sea, when the water levels of the lake are high. When the water levels on the lake are low, the flow is from the sea to the lake. This results in the salt ratio of the lake varying throughout the year. In winter and spring, the lake water is fresh with rain and the waters carried by drainage canals. In the summer time, lake is very salty due to the high evaporation and the water flow from sea to the lake. Also, salt ratio is high at the areas close to the sea connection, and low at the northern sections of the lake where the drainage waters and leakage is effective.

Turkey's largest sand dunes are in the area between the lake and the sea. The dunes extend as wide as 3 kilometers and rise as high as 20 meters. In between the dune hills, that line up along the coast, depression goes below the sea level.

At the shores of the lake, there are swamps and reedbeds which vary in size depending on the fresh water leakage. North of the lake is surrounded with vast farmland.

== Function ==
Deltas in the conservation area are one of the most fertile lands in the world, where the micro and the macro flora production reaches very high levels. The food network, that is formed by high fertility, feeds and shelters a rich wildlife with wide variety of species especially waterfowls.

Deltas are places for fish to lay their eggs and young fish to feed and get protected. Two-thirds of the fish that come to the dinner tables live most of their lives at deltas and other wetlands. This makes deltas very important in terms of the future of fishing.

In winter, as the wetlands in Central Anatolia freezes, many waterfowls inhabit the wetlands of Akyatan. Being on the migration route, Akyatan also hosts huge flocks of birds from many different species. This makes Akyatan lake increasingly important.

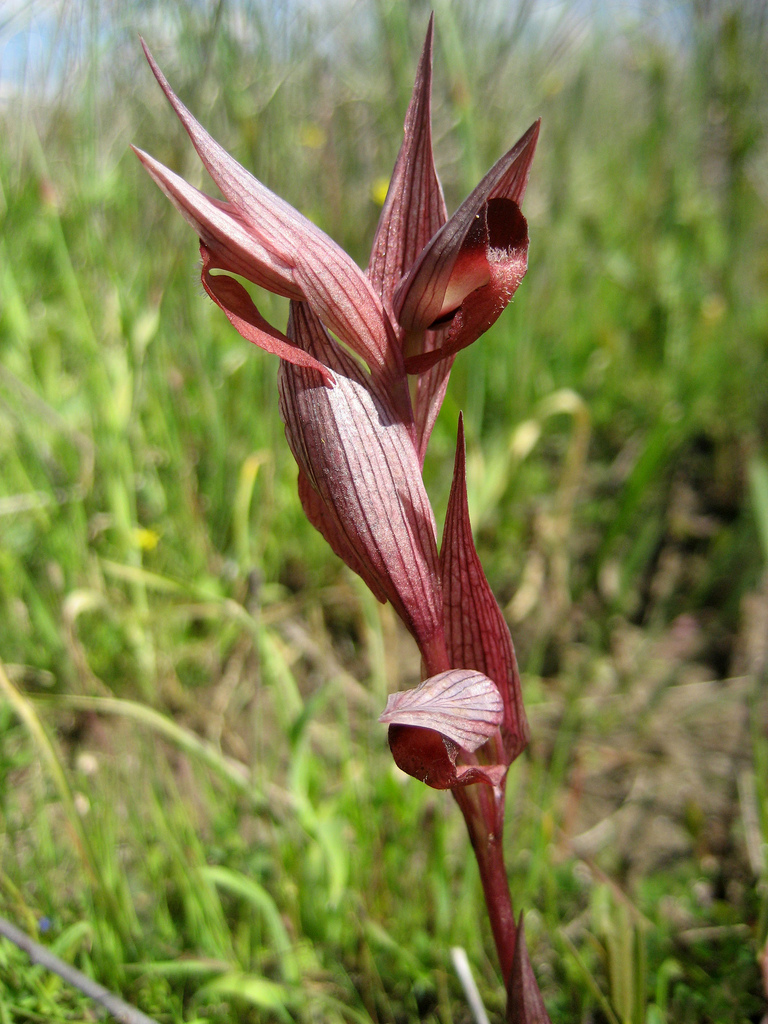
Serapias at Akyatan

Variety of habitats and rich plant and animal collection makes Akyatan an outdoor laboratory for scientific studies. Akyatan also, with the function of balancing base water and preventing salty water from the sea entering into the interior, has contribution in regulating region's water regime.

Akyatan lagoon acts as a multipurpose wetland ecosystem, serving the surrounding communities by creating economy through fishing and by providing recreation. Recreation activities at the lagoon are wildlife watching, hiking, and recreational fishing.

== Flora and vegetation ==
Turkish-Iranian and Mediterranean plant geography dominates the area that Akyatan lagoon is situated. Variety of living environments, provides the evolution of plant species that have different ecological inclination. The most interesting section of the nature reserve in terms of plants are the sand dunes between the lake and the sea. Oleander and acantholimon dominates the section, from the lagoons climbing up to the dune hills. At the inner section, broomrape, kidney weed, common vetch and alfalfa is plenty. The shrub species of the reserve are myrtle, blackberry and common smilax. The dune valleys are covered with early spider orchid, serapias and orchis spitzelii.

Afforestation project started in 1955 for stabilizing the dunes and so far, 3687 hectares of dune area has been afforested. Eucalyptus, acacia saligna, robinia, stone pine, Turkish pine and cupressus is used for afforestation.

At the section that are affected by fresh water, there are rush, reed, water lily and yellow iris. At the salty water swamps, tamarix, salicornia and suaeda spp. is common. Islets near Kapı village are covered with narcissus. At the meadows around the villages, iris and grass lily dominates.

== Fauna ==
Clear water surfaces, reedbeds, fresh and salty swamps, fresh water ponds, small lakes, wide dune ecosystems and shores provide habitats with different ecological characters which attracts wide variety of wildlife especially waterfowls. The wide dunes between the lake and the sea, shrub areas are suitable living environments for carnivorous mammals. The most common in the area is golden jackal. The other common species are red fox, jungle cat, European hare, wild boar, elk, European badger and hedgehog. Mongoose is common at lake shores and at the small lakes which are formed by ancient river tributaries. The region is the westernmost location of its Asian dispersion.

At the rich wetland habitats of Akyatan, hylidae, marsh frog and European green toad can be observed in large numbers. There are also records of observed European otter. The area is also rich with reptiles; the common species are green turtle and loggerhead turtle. Green turtle is a globally endangered species and in the Mediterranean, the species is considered as critically endangered (IUCN 2000) with only 200–300 nesting females remaining, 43% of all nests being at Akyatan, making it the most significant breeding areas of green turtles at the Mediterranean. Adding Kazanlı and Samandağ beaches, Çukurova region holds 62% of the Mediterranean nesting population. Caspian turtle and swamp turtle is common at the fresh water ponds and canals. Tortoise is seen often at the dunes. The other reptiles common at the dunes are; Montpellier snake, coluber, lacertidae, mabuya aurata, chameleon, cyrtopodion, agama stellio.

Akyatan is one of the richest lagoons at the Mediterranean coasts of Turkey. Through the access to the lagoon from the sea, many fish species enter into the lagoon to search for food. The other species worth to mention is blue crab.

=== Ornithology ===
Waterfowl are the most common elements of the Akyatan fauna. Being on the migration route, rich habitat variety and suitable climate makes Akyatan an important place for birds. On an extensive study conducted in March–May 1990, 250 bird species were observed. During the migration period, thousands of birds stopover at Akyatan. Mud surfaces around the lake are ideal environments for shorebirds. The shorebirds that form large flocks during the migration period are; avocet, lesser charadriidae, little stint, ruff and black-tailed godwit.

The insect-rich reedbed shores, shrub covered dunes of the lagoon are an ideal areas for feeding and nesting of hoopoe, European roller and swallows.

Akyatan is also an important nesting ground in winters. During the harsh winters of inland Anatolia, with the freeze of lakes at plateaus, huge flocks of birds fly to Akyatan. It is estimated that 70,000 to 80,000 birds live in Akyatan during winter. Among the birds that nest the winter in Akyatan, pochard, Eurasian wigeon, common shelduck, Eurasian coot form large flocks besides the endangered white-headed duck. Greater flamingo is another popular bird in the area. Every year more than 10,000 greater flamingos, mostly migrating from Lake Urmia in Iran, winters at Akyatan.

Akyatan is an important breeding area for the endangered marbled duck and rarely seen purple swamphen and black francolin. red-crested pochard, mallard and ferruginous duck are other duck species that breed in the area. Eurasian stone-curlew, kentish plover, spur-winged lapwing and little tern also breed in the area.

== Protection and administration ==
Ministry of Environment declared the entire area as wildlife refuge under protection status since 1987. In 1996, Ministry of Housing and Public Works and Ministry of Environment made a co-operation to create environmental order plan that will cover the entire natural areas around Akyatan lake. In this plan, areas that require full protection, areas under ecological influence and the buffer zones are determined by taking the wetlands ecosystems and habitats that are related to into consideration. For each area, policies were developed for the protection of the area and the recreation activities.

World Wildlife Foundation is monitoring the green turtle nesting sites along the 22 km-long Akyatan beach and working with local government authorities to improve marine turtle conservation. In 2006 and 2007, WWF Turkey and the Local Directorate of Ministry of Environment and Forest of Adana initiated a marine turtle monitoring and conservation survey in Çukurova Delta in collaboration with the Adnan Menderes University. WWF Turkey's site-based monitoring activities during the summer of 2006 highlighted the strong impact of jackal predation on the turtle nests (approx. 590 nests were counted with approximately 100-120 eggs in each). WWF Turkey's team encountered many identified nests that were totally destroyed by jackals. It is very hard to prevent predation that is taken place at night along a 22 km coastline. The need to secure as best as possible the safety of the nests as soon as they are located is therefore very important to ensure the safety of the turtle eggs during the incubation period. The application of metal grids over the nests is seen as an appropriate measure that takes into account that the population of the jackal is also endangered on a Mediterranean level. WWF plans to establish a local office and camp site at Akyatan to monitor the beach from June to September, by counting female turtle tracks, locating nest sites, and installing protective devices.

Çukurova University is carrying out the basic studies in the frame of an EU-Life project (LIFETCY/99/TR-087) and has made the necessary preparations to protect the nesting areas of green turtles as a Biosphere Reserve. The proposed Biosphere Reserve would give the entire delta area an overall protection status that would include the sand dune system, which is unique in the eastern Mediterranean.

== Ancient sites ==
The first settlements in the area was during the end of Neolithic Age (800BC-5500BC). At the early age, there used to stand the Mallos ancient city on the east of the lake, near Karataş township. On the southwest of Mallos, Çukurova's first port town, Magarsos, was founded. The north end of Magarsos was surrounded by walls and the ruins from the city today are the castle, the theater, Athena Temple, the bath, sarcophagus and the cistern on the port side. The demolished castle was rebuilt by Abbasid Dynasty during the Middle Age. Karataş Han which was built during the Ottoman Empire is now mostly demolished. The region was ruled by Hitite in the 17th (BC) century, and until Republic of Turkey, Assyrians, Greeks, Romans, Byzantines, Seljuks and Ottomans controlled the region.

== Human activities ==
=== Agriculture and livestock ===
Çukurova is the largest and most fertile delta plain in Turkey. A majority of the delta is used for agriculture. Major agricultural products include cotton, rice, melon, watermelon, strawberry, and grains; citruses are also common. When the whole delta is taken into consideration, population density and agricultural activity is less concentrated around Akyatan than in the upper sections. The urbanization and industrialization in the upper delta, which spurned rapid population growth and massive migration, increased the pressure on the nature reserves of the delta. Almost all of the seasonal wetlands around the lake were zoned to agriculture by draining. Some dunes around the lagoon are leveled and converted into melon, watermelon and strawberry farmland.

Although grazing is forbidden at the afforested dunes, the effects of excessive grazing at the dunes near Kapı and İnaplıhüyük villages are noticeable.

=== Fishing and hunting ===
Akyatan is one of the richest lagoons in the Eastern Mediterranean. Large numbers of fish enter the lagoon from the sea. Karataş fishermen built a traditional fish trap at the exit from the lagoon to the sea, to capture species like gray mullet, gilt-head bream, sea bass, eel, Capoeta antalyensis (ray-finned fish), barbus, carp, common carp, rainbow trout and capoeta. On the eastern section of the lagoon, blue crab is caught. Illegal and careless fishing, collecting juvenile fish, and pollution caused by farmlands jeopardize the future of the fish population in the area.

As the area was declared a wildlife refuge under protected status, any form of hunting is outlawed. With regular patrols in the area, illegal hunting is minimized.

=== Recreation and tourism ===
Recreational activities at Akyatan are strictly limited to birdwatching and guided nature walks. Picnicking and camping are not allowed at the reserve. The only way of getting to Akyatan with public transport is to take a minibus from Adana to Karataş and taking a taxi from there.

There is very little tourist activity at Akyatan. There are some cottages built on the eastern side of the canal that connects the lake to the sea. There are cottages near Tuzla lake and increasing demand to build more.
