= Lake Aygır =

Lake in Turkey

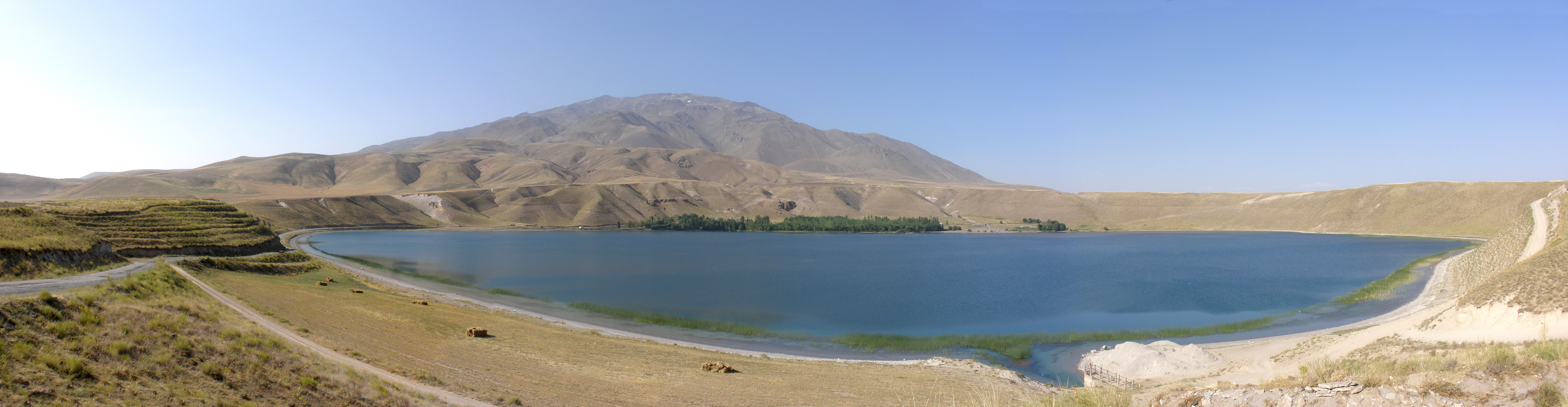

- Location within Turkey
- Location: Adilcevaz, Bitlis Province
- Coordinates: 38.8365°N 42.8230°E
- Lake type: Freshwater, Maar
- Basin countries: Turkey
- Max. width: 37 kilometres (23 mi)
- Max. depth: 65 metres (213 ft)
- Surface elevation: 1,942 m (6,371 ft)

Lake Aygır (Turkish: Aygır Gölü) is a lake in the Adilcevaz district of Bitlis province. It is located at the southern foot of Süphan Mountain..

The sources of lake water are rains and Şorlar Creek from the summit of Mount Süphan. It has been declared a sensitive area to be strictly protected by the Presidency.

== Geology and geography ==
Aygır Lake is a maar lake formed as a result of a phreatic eruption of Mount Süphan, in which groundwater came into contact with volcanic magma, generating a huge volume of steam and causing an explosion. The maar crater is somewhat elliptical, being 1400 m across in the north–south direction and 1820 m in the east–west direction. The lake inside the maar is 1245 m north–south and 1670 m east–west. The elevation of the lake surface is 1942 m. The height of the maar wall is around 70 m in the north and 30 m in the south. The area of the lake inside the maar is around 1.6 km^{2} (0.62 sq mi). The waters of the lake freeze in winter.
