= Paradeniz =

Lagoon of the Mediterranean Sea in Turkey

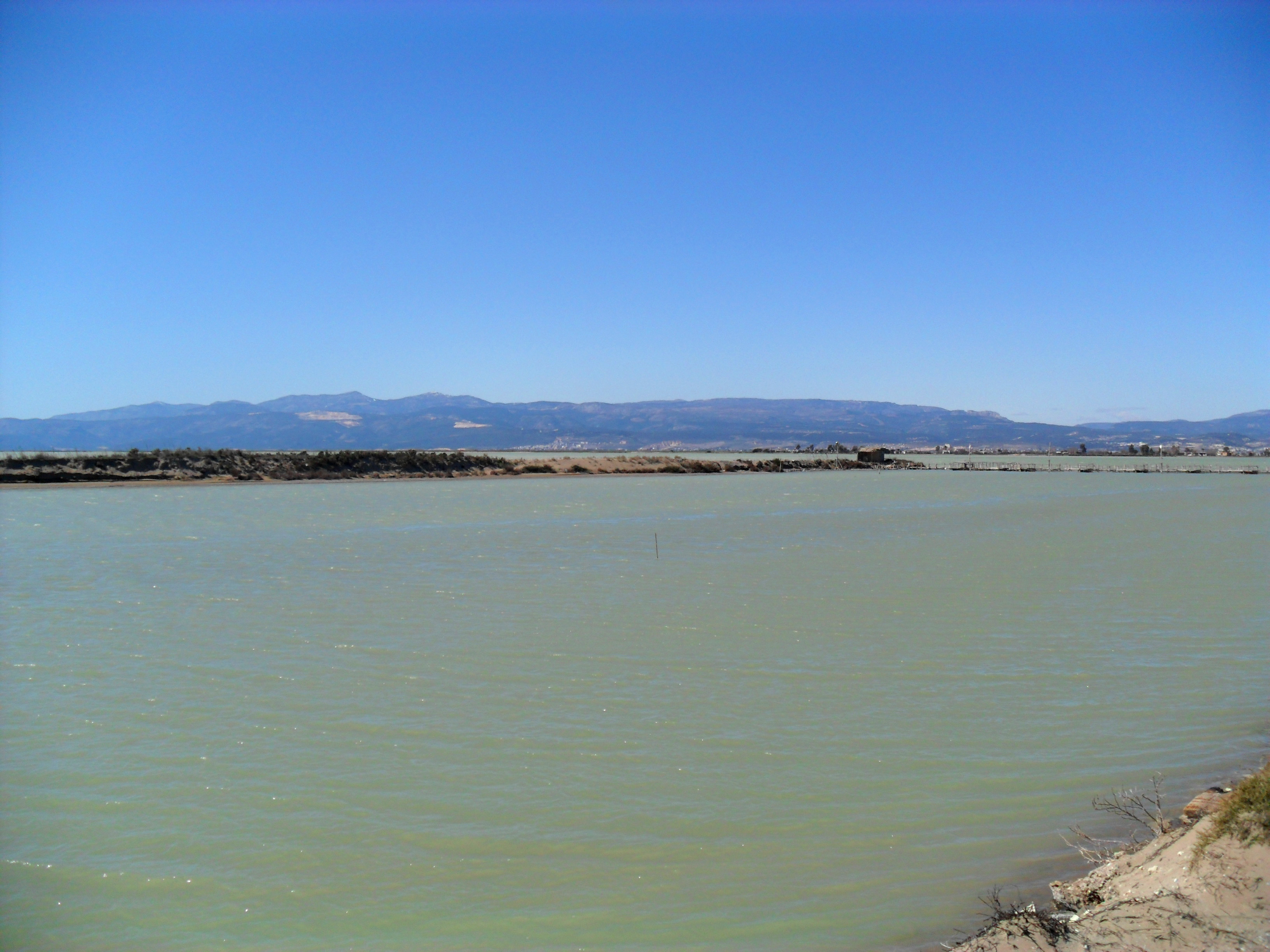
- Paradeniz

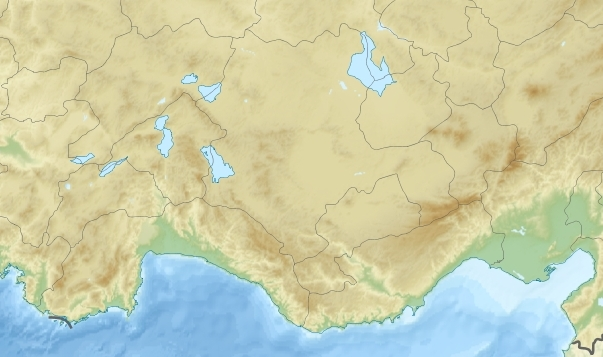
- Location within Southwest Turkey Location within Turkey
- Interactive map of Paradeniz
- Location: Silifke, Mersin Province
- Coordinates: 36°18′N 34°00′E
- Type: Lagoon
- Primary inflows: Akgöl
- Ocean/sea sources: Mediterranean Sea
- Basin countries: Turkey
- Surface area: 4 km^{2} (1.5 sq mi)
- Average depth: 1.5 m (4.9 ft)
- Salinity: 19‰

Paradeniz (literally "semi sea") is a lagoon along the Mediterranean Sea shore in Turkey. It is part of a lagoon system composed of four lakes.

== Geography ==
Paradeniz is in Silifke district of Mersin Province, Turkey. It is a formed within the Göksu Delta at 36°18′N 34°00′E. It is at the west of the river, south west of the town Arkum, north of the cape İncekum and east of the town Taşucu.

== Location ==
East shore line of Paradeniz lies more or less parallel to Mediterranean Sea shore. The average distance to sea is less than 50 m (160 ft). At the north east end there is a narrow channel to sea. The salinity is 19‰, which is less than that of Mediterranean Sea. The surface area of the lagoon is about 4 km^{2} (1.5 sq mi) and the average dept is 1.5 m (4 ft 11 in)

== Ecology ==
Paradeniz together with the surrounding area is an important breeding and wintering area for the waterbirds. The number of bird species which were determined around Paradeniz is as high as 302 Paradeniz is also a fishery. By controlling the narrow channel to sea, fishes are trapped and harvested. The best known Paradeniz produce is blue crab (Callinectes sapidus).
