= Lake Çavuşçu =

Lake in Konya Province, Turkey

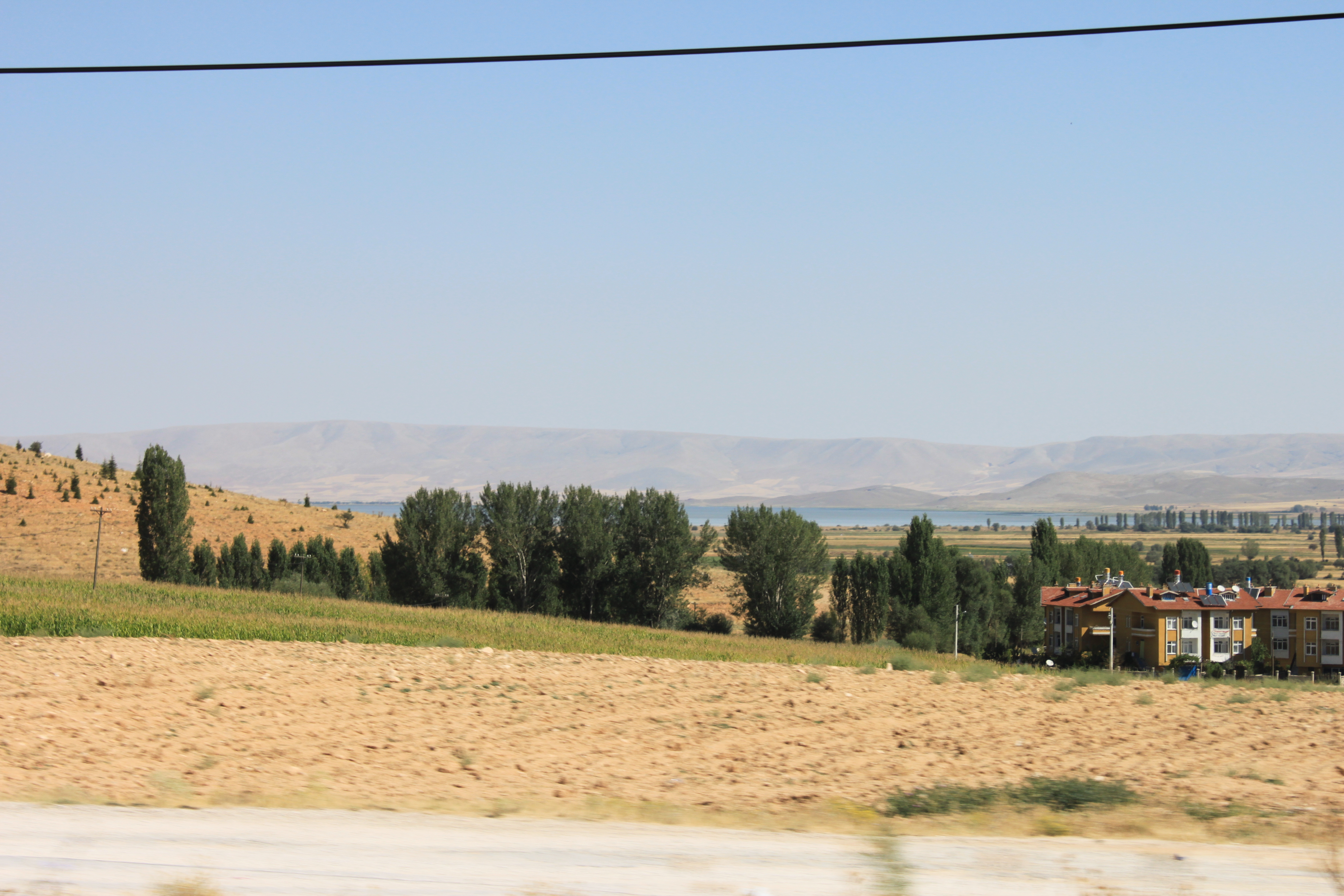
- Çavuşçu Gölü, view from the south side near Ilgın.

- Location of Lake Çavuşçu in Turkey.
- Location: Ilgın, Konya Province
- Coordinates: 38°20′36″N 31°52′39″E
- Basin countries: Turkey
- Surface elevation: 1,110 metres (3,640 ft)

Lake Çavuşçu (also known as Lake Ilgın) is a fresh water lake in Turkey

The lake is situated in Ilgın ilçe (district) of Konya Province at 38°20′36″N 31°52′39″E. Its elevation with respect to sea level is about 1,110 metres (3,640 ft). Its surface area is 3,123 hectares (7,720 acres).

The lake is fed by Battal and Çebişli creeks.

== Fauna ==
The birds of the lake are the following: Moustached warbler, whiskered tern, black tern, common tern, stork, red-crested pochard, greylag goose. Among the fishes of the lake cobitis turcica is an endemic species of Turkey.
