= Lake Burdur =

Large saline lake in south-west Turkey

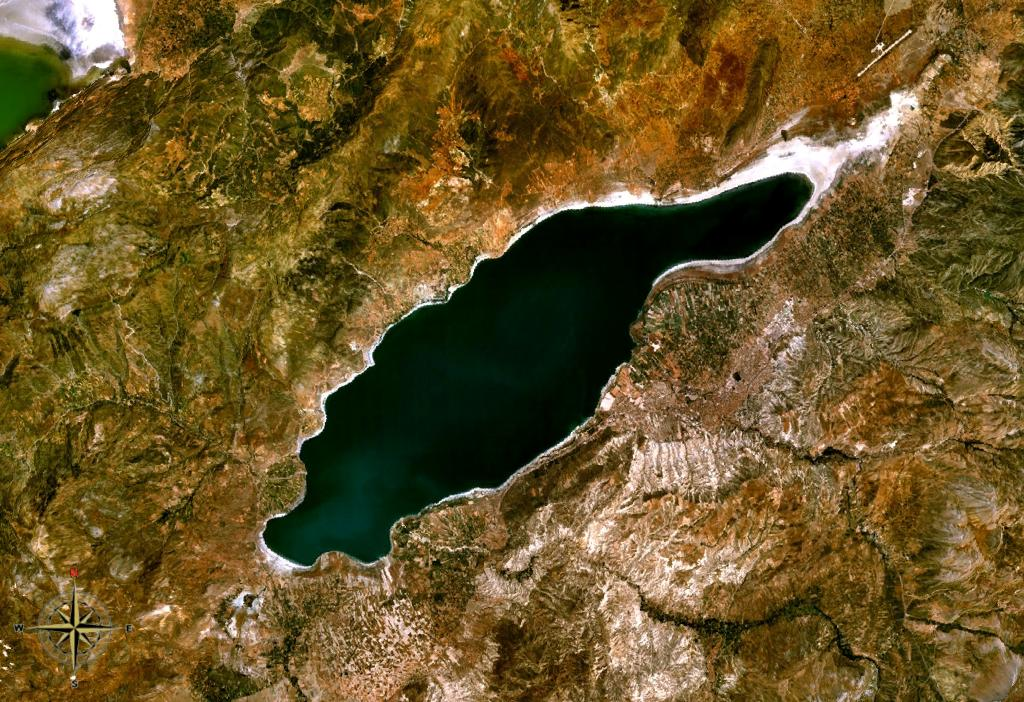
- from space

- Location within Turkey
- Coordinates: 37.75°N 30.18°E
- Type: saline
- Basin countries: Turkey
- Surface area: 250 km^{2} (97 sq mi)
- Max. depth: 110 m (360 ft)
- Surface elevation: 845 m (2,772 ft)
- Settlements: Burdur

Ramsar Wetland
- Designated: 13 July 1994
- Reference no.: 658

Lake Burdur (Turkish: Burdur Gölü) is a large saline lake of tectonic origin, positioned at the frontier between Burdur and Isparta provinces in southwestern Turkey. It has an area of 250 km^{2} and a maximum depth variously reported at between 50 and 110 m. The water level in the lake fluctuates. Lake Burdur is also an important wetland site for many bird species and is designated a Ramsar site.

Lake Burdur is among the largest and deepest lakes in Turkey, located in the Turkish Lakes Region in south-western Anatolia (37°43′351′′ N, 30°10′878′′ E), within a closed basin. The catchment area is 6150 km^{2}. The average depth is 40 m and the maximum depth is 68 m. The maximum surface area is 140 km^{2} at an elevation of 854 m. It is salty and highly alkaline (pH 9.5) and it never freezes.

Lake Burdur is one of the deepest lakes in Turkey. Aquatic plants are not observed in the lake because of the amount of sodium sulphate and chlorine content. Since the lake does not freeze in winter, it serves as a winter refuge for the birds. The ecosystem of the lake is threatened by the presence of an industrial complex and an airport close to the northern shore. The decrease in water levels (because of construction of upstream dams and unknown causes), the increase of sedimentation (from catchment erosion), organic pollution (from food processing and Burdur City raw sewage waste), and inorganic effluent (from a sulphur mine) represent long-term threats to the integrity of the lake. The water level has decreased from 1975 to 2002 due to the construction of dams and ponds in the catchment basin, resulting in the loss of 27% of the lake area during the period of 27 years. Nowadays, the estimated lake area ranges between 140 km^{2} and 153 km^{2}.

Lake Burdur has great ornithological importance, harbouring numerous wintering bird species. It is the most important wintering site in the world for the white-headed duck, a globally threatened species. It has also served as a habitat for 10 other internationally important waterfowl species. Lake Burdur has been a Ramsar Site since 1993 and a Wildlife Reserve since 1994. The only fish species Anatolichthys sureyanus is endemic to the lake.

The formation of the lake began 5 million years ago as a tectonic depression (The burdur area is in a first grade earthquake zone). It is known that the lake maintained its fresh water character for a long period of time. The altitude in the Plio-Pleistocene period was 100 m higher, so the lake extended in a NE–SW direction. In the late Pleistocene period, salinization and shrinking of the lake began, which is a process in progress today. Since 1975, an altitude change of -10 m and a 27% volume loss have been recorded. The main causes of these figures are dams and ponds built on the lake's main sources, such as the Bozcay stream; the severe drought between 1988 and 1995; and, most notably, the extensive use of aquifers by local farmers.
