= Narlıdere (disambiguation) =

Narlıdere is a municipality and district in Turkey.

Narlıdere can also refer to:

- Narlıdere, Bitlis
- Narlıdere, Kestel
