= Yeşilsırt =

Yeşilsırt can refer to:

- Yeşilsırt, Bitlis
- Yeşilsırt, Dicle
