= Dereağzı =

Dereağzı - Turkish toponym, can refer to:

- Dereağzı, Bitlis
- Dereağzı, İncirliova
- Dereağzı, Nazilli
- Dereağzı, Tavas
