= Karuk (disambiguation) =

The Karuk are a Native American people from what is now California. Karuk may also refer to:

- Karuk language, their language
- Karuk Tribe, a federally recognized tribe of Karuk
- Karuk, Kerman, a village in Narmashir County, Iran

== See also ==
- Boneh Karuk, a village in Bagh-e Malek County, Iran
- Estakhr-e Garuk (also romanized Estakhr-e Karuk), a village in Jiroft County, Iran
- Koruk (disambiguation)
