= Bashan (disambiguation) =

Bashan can refer to:

- Bashan - northern trans-Jordan region in Hebrew Bible accounts
- Bashan Dam
- Bashan, Iran, a village in Iran
- Başhan, Bismil, Turkey
- Başhan, Bitlis, Turkey
- Yigal Bashan, Israeli singer-songwriter and actor

== See also ==
- places in Singapore, see Bishan (disambiguation)
