= Koruk =

Koruk may refer to:

- Koruk Chutur, a village in Kalaleh County, Iran
- Kuruk, a village in Kalaleh County, Iran
- Koruk, Bitlis, a village in Turkey

== See also ==
- Karuk (disambiguation)
