= Ekinli =

Ekinli can refer to:

- Ekinli, Bitlis
- Ekinli, Karacabey
