= Dörtağaç =

Dörtağaç can refer to:

- Dörtağaç, Bitlis
- Dörtağaç, Seyhan
