= Ağaçpınar =

Ağaçpınar can refer to the following villages in Turkey:

- Ağaçpınar, Bitlis
- Ağaçpınar, Ceyhan
