= Kavakdibi =

Kavakdibi can refer to:

- Kavakdibi, Bitlis
- Kavakdibi, Kozluk
