= Yayalar =

Yayalar (literally "pedestrians" in Turkish) may refer to the following places in Turkey:

- Yayalar, Bitlis, a village
- Yayalar, Kazan, a village and neighborhood in the district of Kazan, Ankara Province
- Yayalar, Kozluk, a village in the district of Kozluk, Batman Province
