= Yaygın =

Yaygın can refer to:

- Yaygın, Bitlis
- Yaygin, Muş
