= Çobansuyu, Bitlis =

Village in Turkey

Çobansuyu
- Village
- Location in Turkey
- Coordinates: 38°13′N 42°01′E
- Country: Turkey
- Province: Bitlis
- District: Bitlis
- Population (2021): 91
- Time zone: UTC+3 (TRT)

Çobansuyu (Kurdish: Herde) is a village in the Bitlis District of Bitlis Province in Turkey. The village is populated by Kurds and had a population of 91 in 2021.

The hamlets of Akgün and Mutlu are attached to the village.

== History ==
The village was evacuated in 1992 by the Turkish army.
