= Yolalan =

- Municipality
- Location in Turkey
- Coordinates: 38°16′14″N 42°18′28″E
- Country: Turkey
- Province: Bitlis
- District: Bitlis
- Population (2021): 3,091
- Time zone: UTC+3 (TRT)

Yolalan is a town (belde) in the Bitlis District, Bitlis Province, Turkey. Its population is 3,091 (2021).
