= Ortakapı, Bitlis =

Village in Turkey

Ortakapı
- Village
- Location in Turkey
- Coordinates: 38°18′N 42°01′E
- Country: Turkey
- Province: Bitlis
- District: Bitlis
- Population (2021): 49
- Time zone: UTC+3 (TRT)

Ortakapı is a village in the Bitlis District of Bitlis Province in Turkey. Its population is 49 (2021).
