= Semra Çağlar Gökalp =

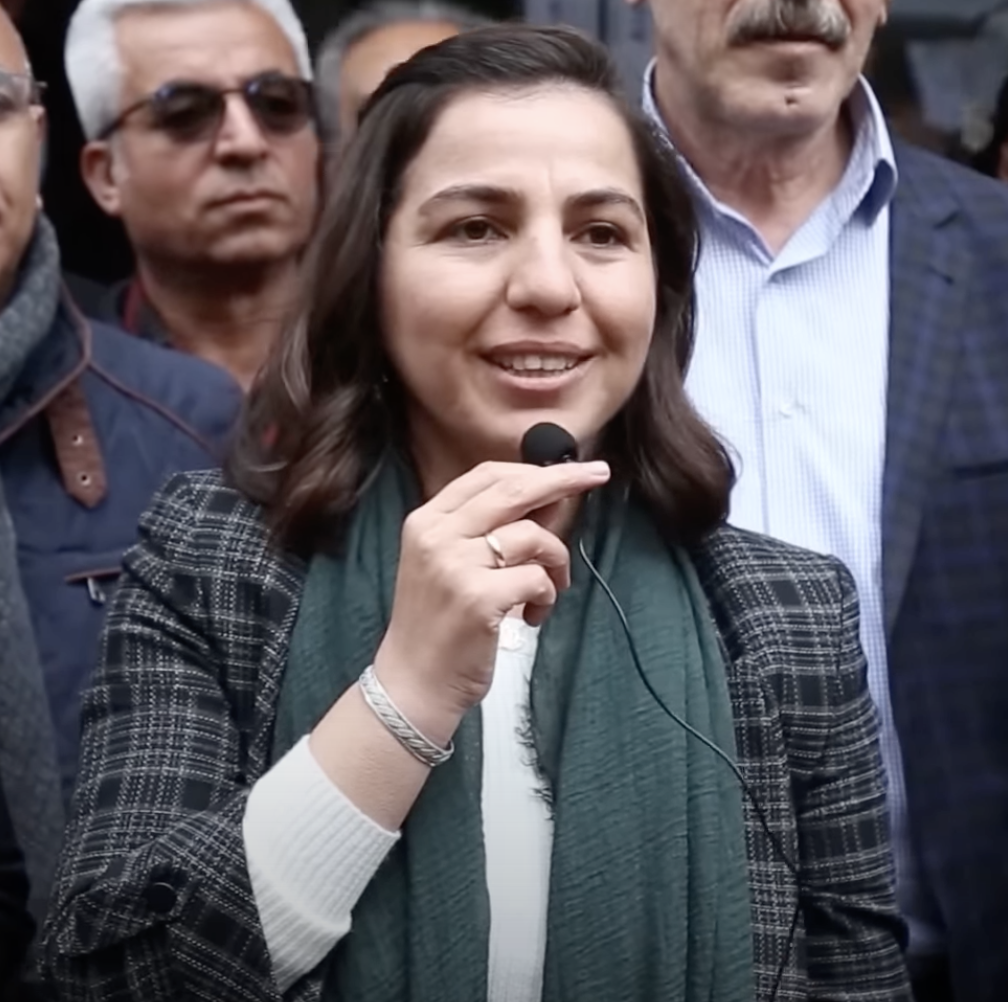

Semra Çağlar Gökalp (1988, Kayalıbağ, Turkey) is a human rights activist and politician of the Peoples' Equality and Democracy Party (DEM Party). Since June 2023, she is a member of the Grand National Assembly of Turkey.

== Early life and education ==
Semra Çağlar Gökalp was born in the village Kayalıbağ in Bitlis in 1988 where she spent the first years of her childhood. In the 1990s she had to migrate to Antalya where she graduated from primary school and high school. Later she studied English language at the Yücüncü Yıl University.

== Professional career ==
Following, Semra Çağlar Gökalp was employed at the Van Municipality in the office of foreign relations and the European Union until in 2017, the Governor of Van replaced the elected mayor. In February 2017, she was dismissed with over 200 other employees of the municipality. In 2021, she was elected into the Board of Directors of the Antalya branch of the Human Rights Association Antalya.

== Political career ==
In the parliamentary elections of May 2023, she was elected into the Grand National Assembly of Turkey, representing Bitlis for the YSP: She is in favor gender equality and supports the implementation of a co-leadership of a woman and a man at all political levels. She aims to defend women's and prisoners rights in parliament and opposes the imprisonment of the former leader of the Peoples Democratic Party (HDP) Selahattin Demirtas.
