= Alaniçi, Bitlis =

Village in Turkey

Alaniçi
- Village
- Location in Turkey
- Coordinates: 38.216°N 41.857°E
- Country: Turkey
- Province: Bitlis
- District: Bitlis
- Population (2021): 340
- Time zone: UTC+3 (TRT)

Alaniçi (Kurdish: Kermate) is a village in the Bitlis District of Bitlis Province in Turkey. The village is populated by Kurds of the Etmanekî tribe and had a population of 340 in 2021.

The hamlets of Aktaş and Yenice (Destomî) are attached to the village.
