= Yuvacık, Bitlis =

Village in Turkey

Yuvacık
- Village
- Location in Turkey
- Coordinates: 38.2772°N 42.2686°E
- Country: Turkey
- Province: Bitlis
- District: Bitlis
- Population (2021): 36
- Time zone: UTC+3 (TRT)

Yuvacık is a village in the Bitlis District of Bitlis Province in Turkey. Its population is 36 (2021).
