= Geçitbaşı, Bitlis =

Village in Turkey

Geçitbaşı
- Village
- Location in Turkey
- Coordinates: 38°21′58″N 42°14′47″E
- Country: Turkey
- Province: Bitlis
- District: Bitlis
- Population (2021): 213
- Time zone: UTC+3 (TRT)

Geçitbaşı is a village in the Bitlis District of Bitlis Province in Turkey. Its population is 213 (2021).
