= İçmeli, Bitlis =

Village in Turkey

İçmeli
- Village
- Location in Turkey
- Coordinates: 38°22′9″N 42°2′3″E
- Country: Turkey
- Province: Bitlis
- District: Bitlis
- Population (2021): 218
- Time zone: UTC+3 (TRT)

İçmeli is a village in the Bitlis District of Bitlis Province in Turkey. Its population is 218 (2021).
