= Kireçtaşı, Bitlis =

Village in Turkey

Kireçtaşı
- Village
- Location in Turkey
- Coordinates: 38°21′35″N 42°05′40″E
- Country: Turkey
- Province: Bitlis
- District: Bitlis
- Population (2021): 1,218
- Time zone: UTC+3 (TRT)

Kireçtaşı is a village in the Bitlis District of Bitlis Province in Turkey. Its population is 1,218 (2021).
