= Akçalı, Bitlis =

Village in Turkey

Akçalı
- Village
- Location in Turkey
- Coordinates: 38.3191°N 42.1483°E
- Country: Turkey
- Province: Bitlis
- District: Bitlis
- Population (2021): 59
- Time zone: UTC+3 (TRT)

Akçalı is a village in the Bitlis District of Bitlis Province in Turkey. Its population is 59 (2021).
