= Çeltikli, Bitlis =

Village in Turkey

Çeltikli
- Village
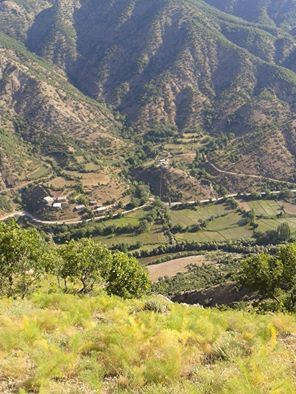

- Location within Turkey
- Coordinates: 38°15′15″N 42°6′9″E
- Country: Turkey
- Province: Bitlis
- District: Bitlis
- Population (2021): 278
- Time zone: UTC+3 (TRT)

Çeltikli is a village in the Bitlis District of Bitlis Province in Turkey. Its population is 278 (2021).
