= Bitlis District =

District of Bitlis Province, Turkey

- District
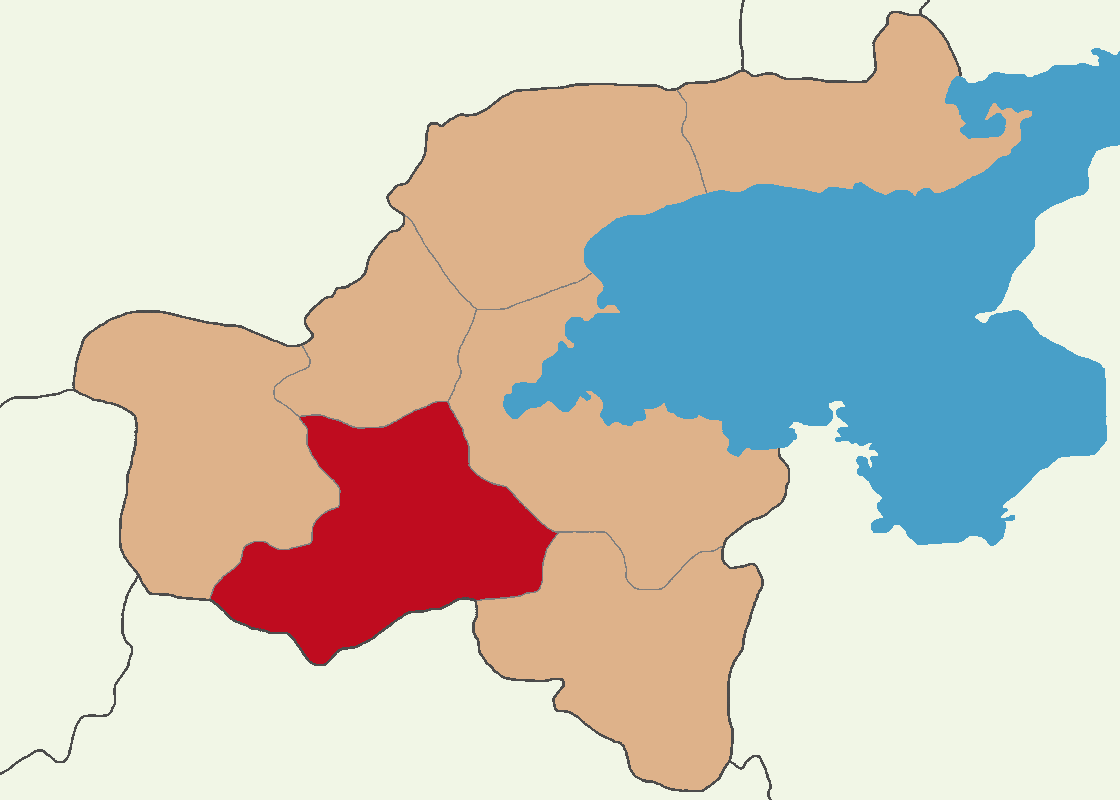
- Map showing Bitlis District in Bitlis Province

- Location in Turkey
- Coordinates: 38°24′N 42°07′E
- Country: Turkey
- Province: Bitlis
- Seat: Bitlis
- Area: 1,064 km^{2} (411 sq mi)
- Population (2021): 71,077
  - Density: 66.80/km^{2} (173.0/sq mi)
- Time zone: UTC+3 (TRT)

Bitlis District (also: Merkez, meaning "central") is a district of Bitlis Province of Turkey. Its seat is the city Bitlis. Its area is 1,064 km^{2}, and its population is 71,077 (2021).

== Composition ==
There are two municipalities in Bitlis District:

- Bitlis
- Yolalan

There are 77 villages in Bitlis District:

- Ağaçdere
- Ağaçköprü
- Ağaçpınar
- Akçalı
- Alaniçi
- Arıdağ
- Aşağıbalcılar
- Aşağıkaraboy
- Aşağıölek
- Aşağıyolak
- Ayrancılar
- Başhan
- Başmaklı
- Bayramalan
- Beşkaynak
- Bölükyazı
- Çalıdüzü
- Çayırbaşı
- Çeltikli
- Çobansuyu
- Cumhuriyet
- Değirmenaltı
- Deliktaş
- Dereağzı
- Dikme
- Direktaşı
- Doğruyol
- Dörtağaç
- Döşkaya
- Ekinli
- Esenburun
- Geçitbaşı
- İçgeçit
- İçmeli
- Ilıcak
- Karbastı
- Karınca
- Kavakdibi
- Kayabaşı
- Kayadağ
- Kayalıbağ
- Keklikdüzü
- Kınalı
- Kireçtaşı
- Kokarsu
- Kömüryakan
- Konalga
- Konuksayar
- Koruk
- Küllüce
- Narlıdere
- Oğulcak
- Ortakapı
- Sarıkonak
- Sarpkaya
- Tabanözü
- Tanrıyar
- Tatlıkaynak
- Tınar
- Uçankuş
- Üçevler
- Ünaldı
- Yanlızçamlar
- Yarönü
- Yayalar
- Yaygın
- Yeşilsırt
- Yolağzı
- Yolcular
- Yolyazı
- Yücebaş
- Yukarıbalcılar
- Yukarıkaraboy
- Yukarıölek
- Yukarıyolak
- Yumurtatepe
- Yuvacık
