= Yukarıkaraboy, Bitlis =

Village in Turkey

Yukarıkaraboy
- Village
- Location in Turkey
- Coordinates: 38°28′N 41°59′E
- Country: Turkey
- Province: Bitlis
- District: Bitlis
- Population (2021): 143
- Time zone: UTC+3 (TRT)

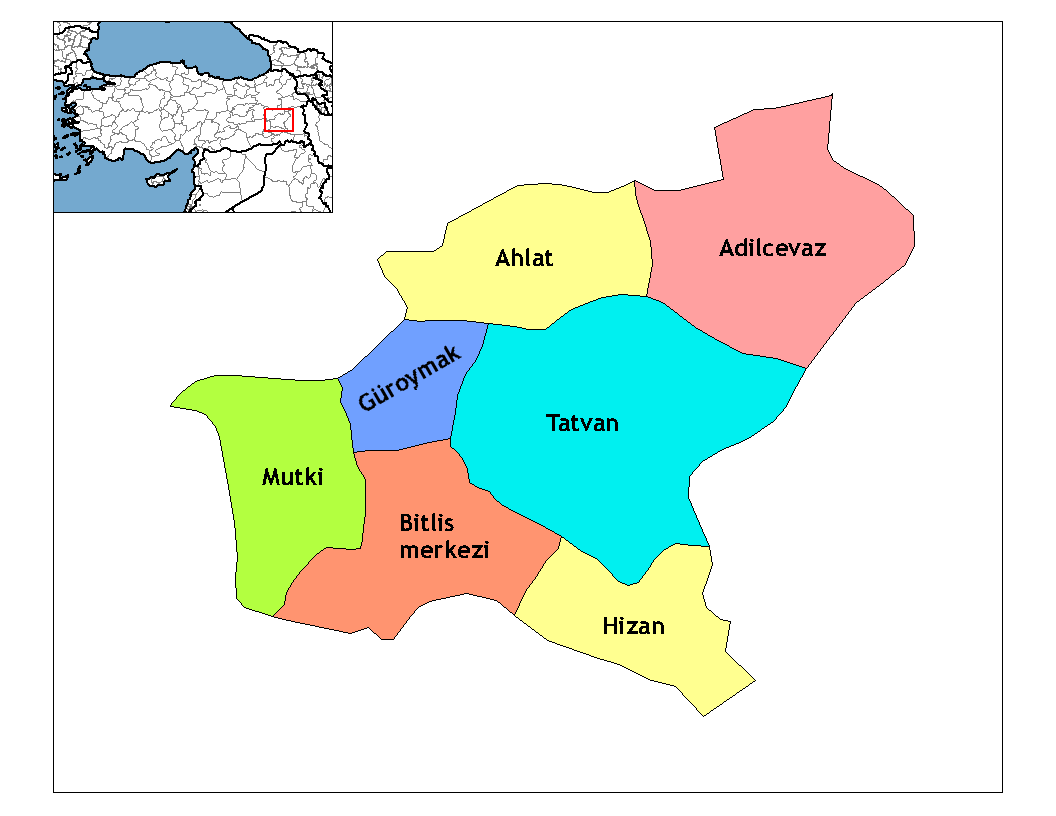
Districts in Bitlis province, Turkey

Yukarıkaraboy is a village in the Bitlis District of Bitlis Province in Turkey. Its population is 143 (2021).
