= Tatlıkaynak, Bitlis =

Village in Turkey

Tatlıkaynak
- Village
- Location in Turkey
- Coordinates: 38°22′N 42°04′E
- Country: Turkey
- Province: Bitlis
- District: Bitlis
- Population (2021): 301
- Time zone: UTC+3 (TRT)

Tatlıkaynak is a village in the Bitlis District of Bitlis Province in Turkey. Its population is 301 (2021).
