= Sarıkonak, Bitlis =

Village in Turkey

Sarıkonak
- Village
- Location in Turkey
- Coordinates: 38.250°N 41.967°E
- Country: Turkey
- Province: Bitlis
- District: Bitlis
- Population (2021): 152
- Time zone: UTC+3 (TRT)

Sarıkonak (Kurdish: Şêna Duxan) is a village in the Bitlis District of Bitlis Province in Turkey. The village is populated by Kurds of the Etmanekî tribe and had a population of 152 in 2021.

The hamlet of Abacılar is attached to the village.
