= Değirmenaltı, Bitlis =

Village in Bitlis Province, Turkey

Değirmenaltı
- Village
- Location within Turkey
- Coordinates: 38°25′49″N 42°10′31″E
- Country: Turkey
- Province: Bitlis
- District: Bitlis
- Population (2021): 1,137
- Time zone: UTC+3 (TRT)

Değirmenaltı (Armenian: Պոր, romanized: Por, Bor) is a village in Bitlis District in Bitlis Province, Turkey. Its population is 1,137 (2021).

The village still contains the ruins of the church of St Anania as well as many khatchkars (Armenian carved memorial stones).

In modern times, Değirmenaltı is populated by Kurds.

== Armenian monument remains ==
The village is notable for the good condition of its many Armenian khachkar stones, which have been remarked on by The Telegraph, and appeared in the Armenian Genocide documentary 100 Years Later. They have been described as "the most important collection of Armenian khatchkars now surviving in Turkey." The khachkars stand next to the former Church of St. Anania, which dates from the 6th or 7th century and at the time of publication of historian Thomas Sinclair's architectural survey of Turkey (1987) was used by the population of the village as a barn. Half a mile east of the village are the remains of the Armenian Monastery of St. John. This monastery is on private property and has suffered extensive damage by treasure hunters inspired by stories of buried gold.

The St. Anania Monastery is a rectangular building containing a single-nave church with a ribbed stone ceiling and a round apse. A khachkar dated to 1456 stood inside, near the entrance, at least until the 1980s. (Note: This khachkar is described by Professor Thomas Sinclair's survey of archeological sites in eastern Turkey. The state of the building and its monuments may have changed or deteriorated since that publication.) A zhamatun (outer room or assembly area of a monastery) was attached to the west side of the church and is contiguous with it, being accessible through a former door in the west wall of the church. It consisted of a square room containing one row of arches running north to south. The zhamatun was most likely added in the mid-15th century when some of the monks from the St John Monastery seem to have moved down into the village and occupied this monastery. An inscription on its wall seems to indicate the year 1466, which may mark the date when it was completed. The monks moved back to the St John Monastery in the 1520s or 1530s, at which point the zhamatun may have been sealed up. Three rows of khachkars are found outside the south wall of the monastery (or once were). One row starts near the church door and most likely dates from 1513, which is the date indicated on the first stone. Another row, more badly damaged, starts near the junction of the church and zhamatun. A third row, which starts near the outer door of the zhamatun, contains a mix of broken and well-preserved stones that likely all date from 1496.

St. Anania Monastery and khatchkars

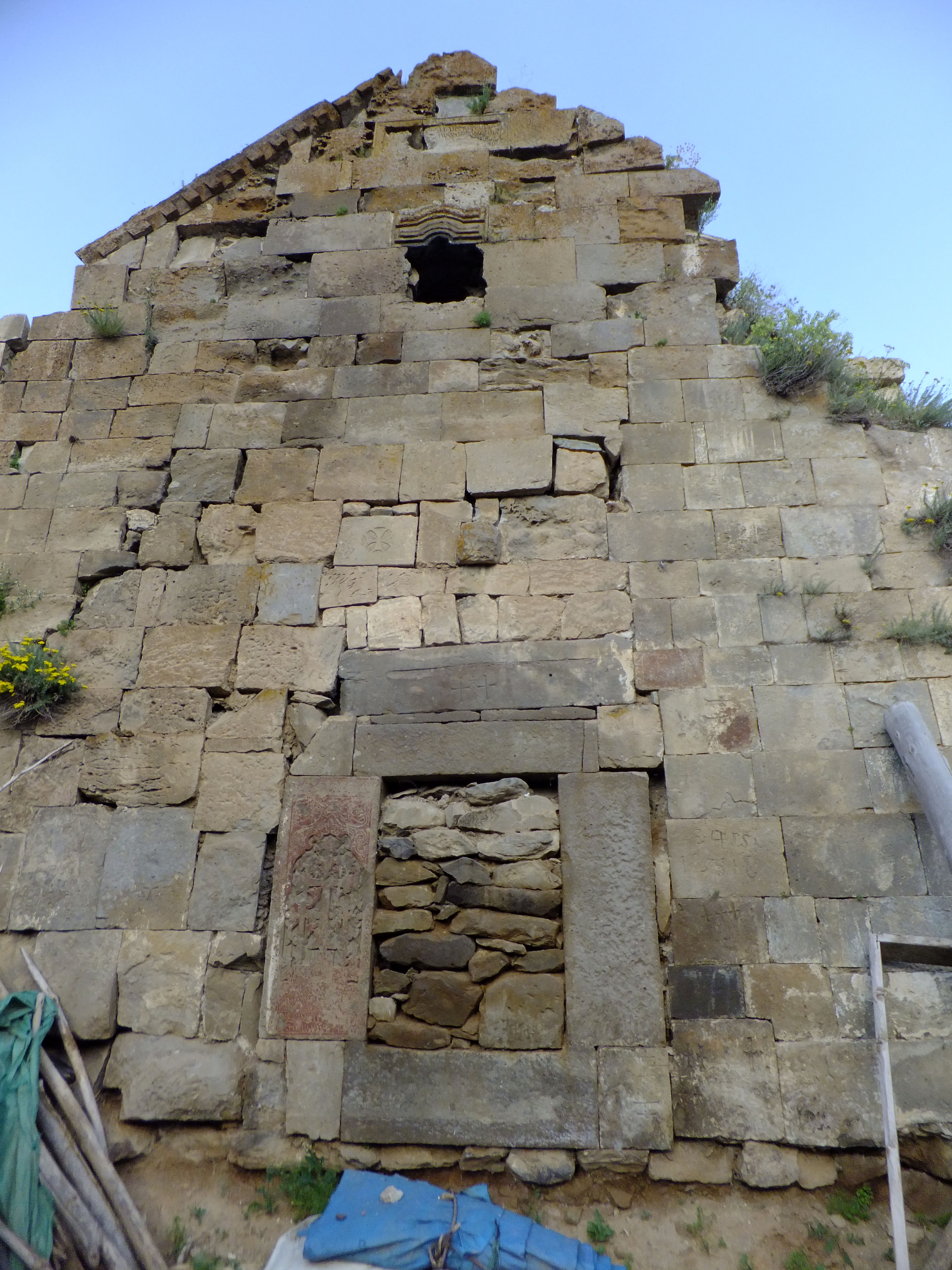
West wall of the St. Anania Monastery (2014 photo)

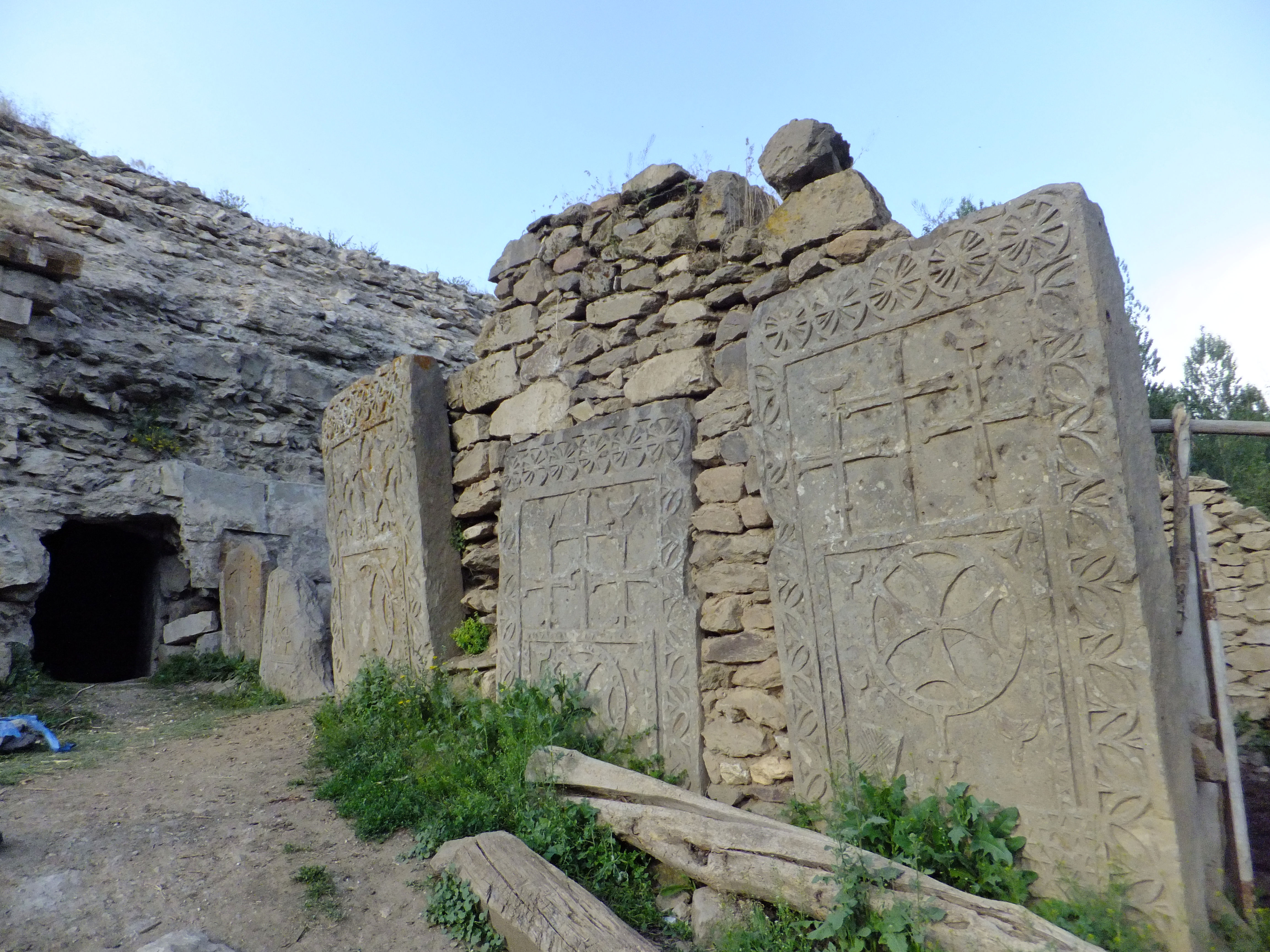
One of the series of khachkars on the south side of the monastery (currently reused as part of a partition wall) (2014 photo)

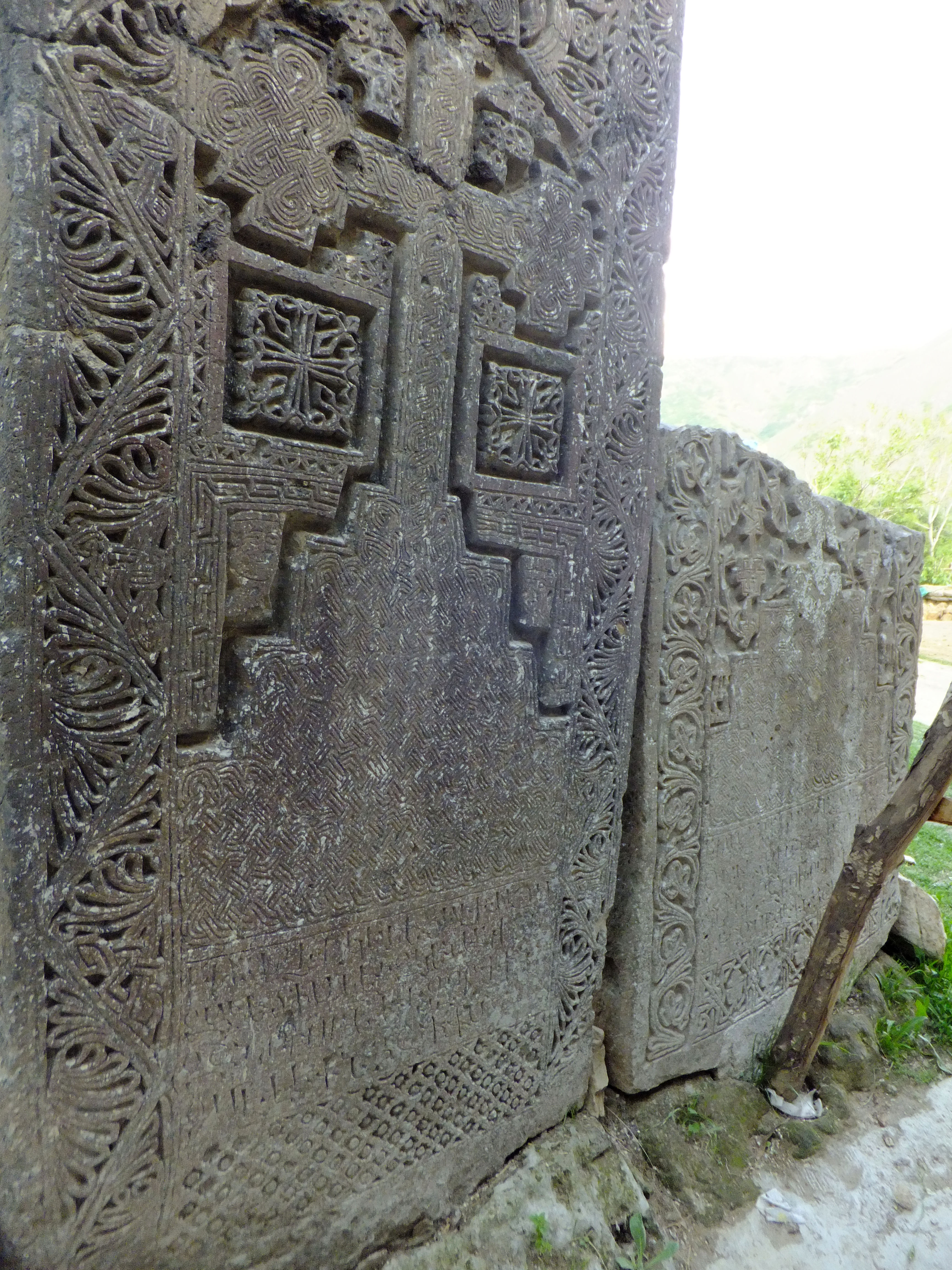
Another series of khachkars on the south side of the monastery, with one stone broken (2014 photo)

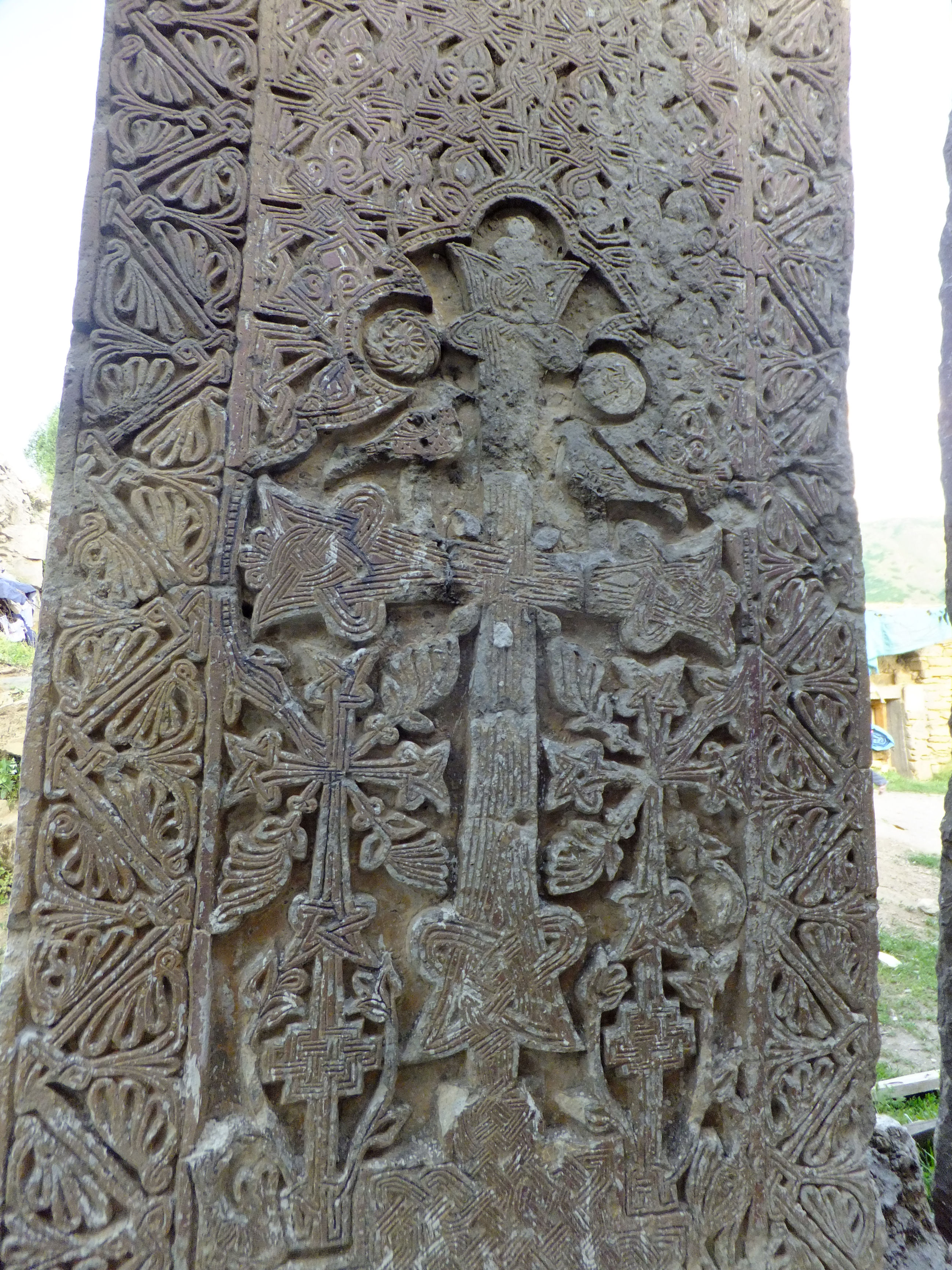
Detail of one of the tallest khachkars at the site (2014 photo)

The St John Monastery to the east consists of a small single-nave church or chapel, dating at least in part from the 6th or 7th century, and an attached zhamatun, probably from the 16th century. The zhamatun here is a square chamber with one row of two arches. It is located on the west side of the church but its layout and position makes it project southward from the rest of the building. A single door inside connects both sections.

St. John Monastery

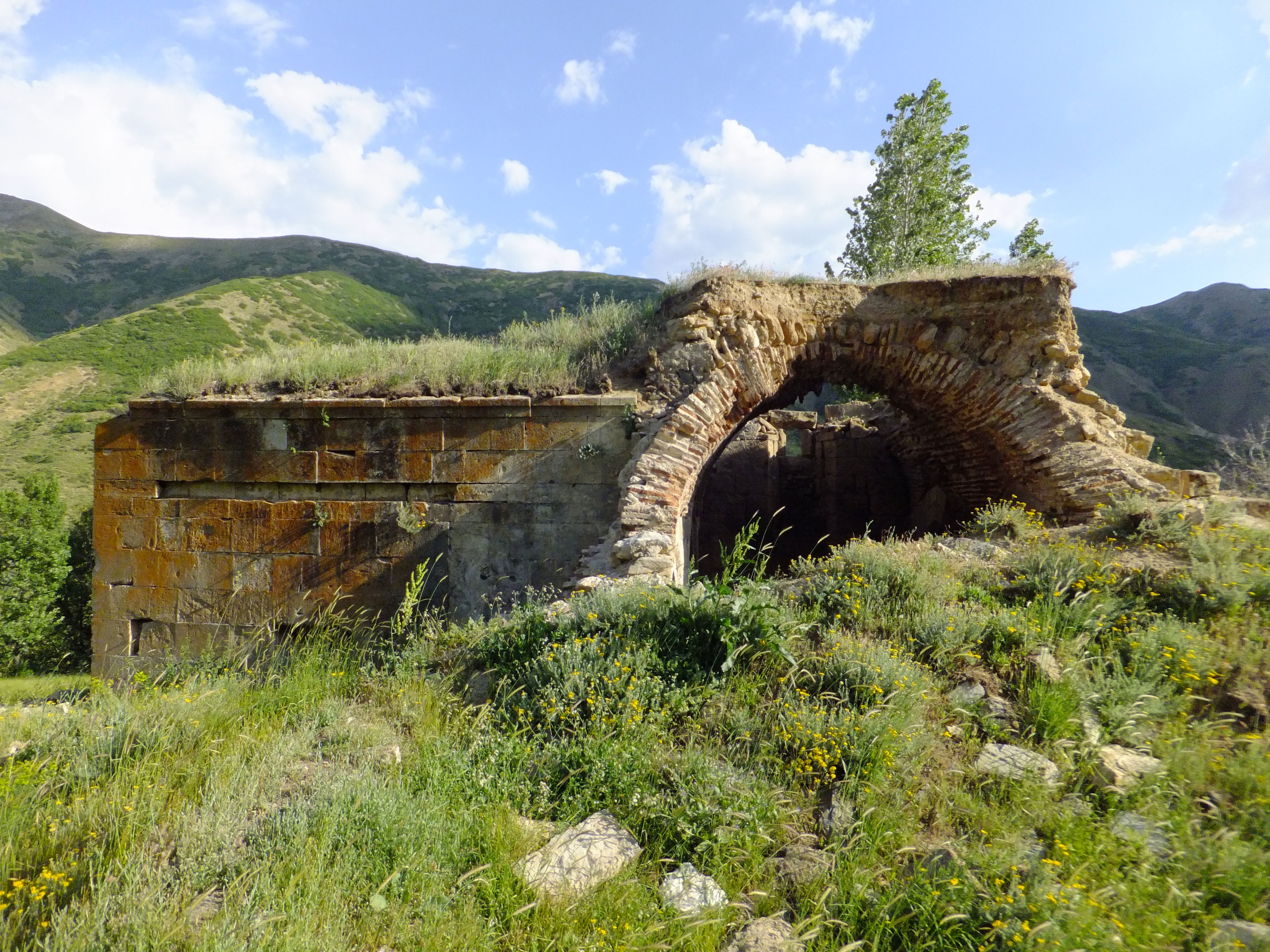
Remains of St. John Monastery, east of the village (2014 photo)

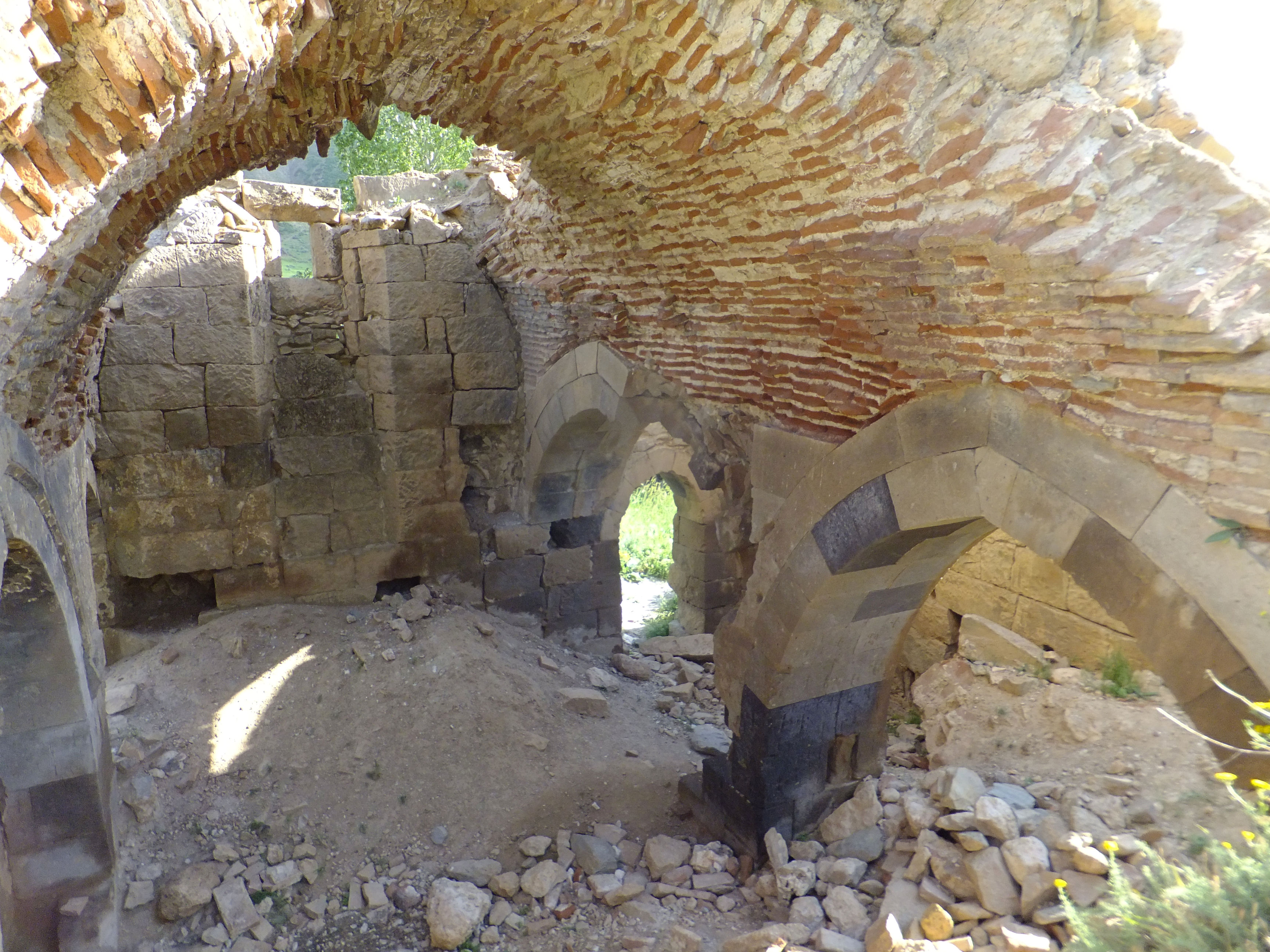
Remains of the zhamatun of St. John Monastery (2014 photo)

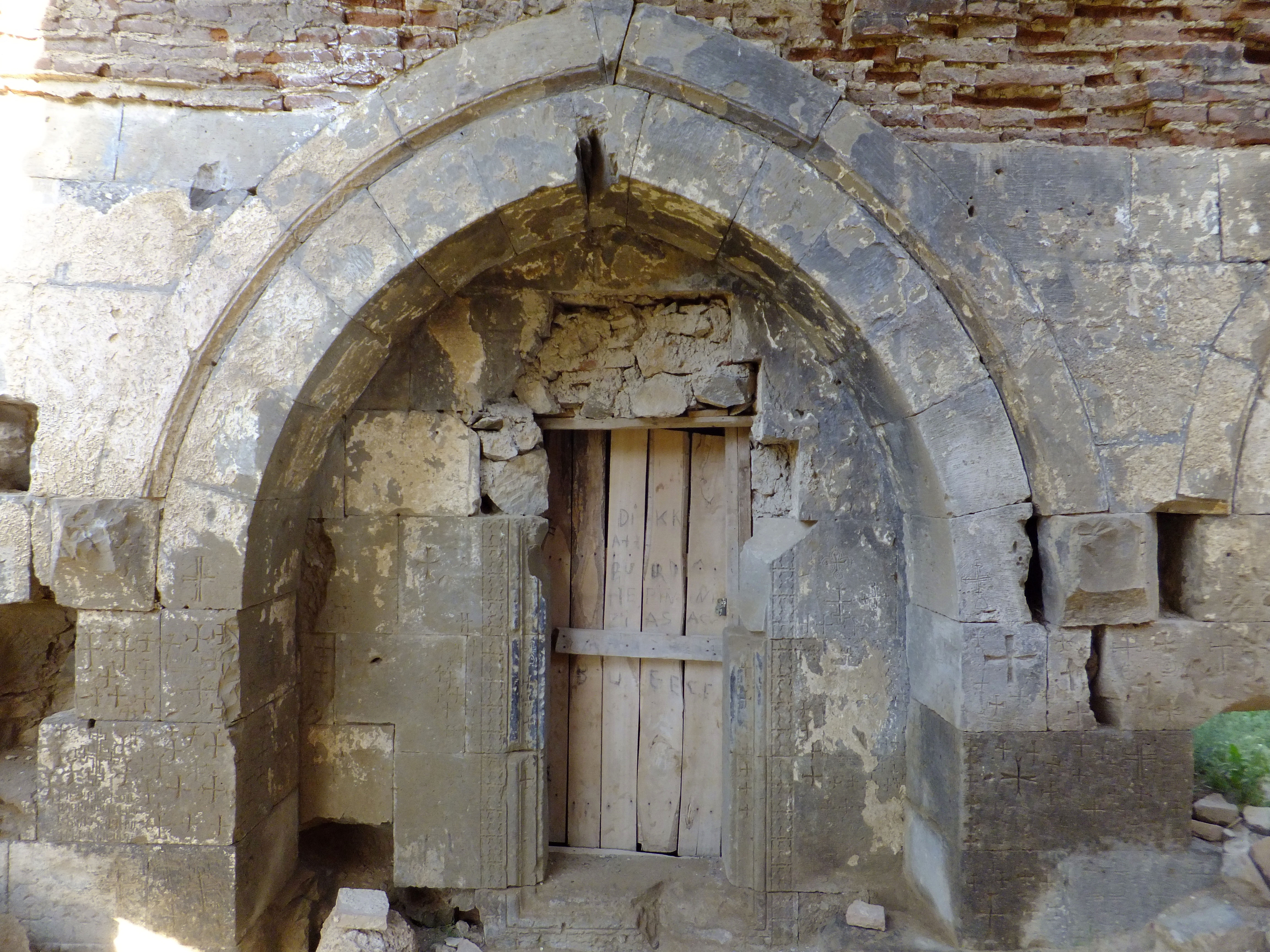
Doorway to the main church of the monastery (2014 photo)
