= Karınca, Bitlis =

Village in Turkey

Karınca
- Village
- Location in Turkey
- Coordinates: 38.272°N 41.962°E
- Country: Turkey
- Province: Bitlis
- District: Bitlis
- Population (2021): 346
- Time zone: UTC+3 (TRT)

Karınca (Kurdish: Qenexder) is a village in the Bitlis District of Bitlis Province in Turkey. The village is populated by Kurds of the Etmanekî tribe and had a population of 346 in 2021.
