= Aşağıyolak, Bitlis =

Village in Turkey

Aşağıyolak
- Village
- Location in Turkey
- Coordinates: 38°15′22″N 42°05′31″E
- Country: Turkey
- Province: Bitlis
- District: Bitlis
- Population (2021): 34
- Time zone: UTC+3 (TRT)

Aşağıyolak (Kurdish: Çeman) is a village in the Bitlis District of Bitlis Province in Turkey. The village is populated by Kurds and had a population of 34 in 2021.

It was burned by authorities in the early 1990s, during the Kurdish–Turkish conflict.
