= Direktaşı, Bitlis =

Village in Turkey

Direktaşı
- Village
- Location in Turkey
- Coordinates: 38.298°N 41.978°E
- Country: Turkey
- Province: Bitlis
- District: Bitlis
- Population (2021): 25
- Time zone: UTC+3 (TRT)

Direktaşı (Kurdish: Tutu) is a village that is located in the Bitlis District of Bitlis Province in Turkey. The village is populated by Kurds of the Dudêran tribe and had a population of 25 in 2021.
