= Kayalıbağ, Bitlis =

Village in Turkey

Kayalıbağ
- Village
- Location in Turkey
- Coordinates: 38.208°N 41.953°E
- Country: Turkey
- Province: Bitlis
- District: Bitlis
- Population (2022): 1
- Time zone: UTC+3 (TRT)

Kayalıbağ (Kurdish: Lêrd) is a village in the Bitlis District of Bitlis Province in Turkey. The village is populated by Kurds of the Dimilî tribe and had a population of 1 in 2022.

The hamlet of Kaşıklı is attached to the village.

== Population ==
Population history of the village from 1990 to 2022:

Population
Year	Pop.	±%
1990	279	—
2007	0	−100.0%
2008	14	—
2009	2	−85.7%
2010	18	+800.0%
2011	8	−55.6%
2012	4	−50.0%
2013	4	+0.0%
2014	4	+0.0%
2015	4	+0.0%
2016	4	+0.0%
2017	3	−25.0%
2018	1	−66.7%
2019	1	+0.0%
2020	1	+0.0%
2021	1	+0.0%
2022	1	+0.0%

== Notable people ==
- Semra Çağlar Gökalp, politician
