= Arıdağ, Bitlis =

Village in Turkey

Arıdağ
- Village
- Location in Turkey
- Coordinates: 38°21′N 42°10′E
- Country: Turkey
- Province: Bitlis
- District: Bitlis
- Population (2021): 1,007
- Time zone: UTC+3 (TRT)

Arıdağ is a village in the Bitlis District of Bitlis Province in Turkey. Its population is 1,007 (2021).
