= Ağaçköprü, Bitlis =

Village in Turkey

Ağaçköprü
- Village
- Location in Turkey
- Coordinates: 38.335°N 42.002°E
- Country: Turkey
- Province: Bitlis
- District: Bitlis
- Population (2021): 76
- Time zone: UTC+3 (TRT)

Ağaçköprü (Kurdish: Hurmuz) is a village in the Bitlis District of Bitlis Province in Turkey. The village is populated by Kurds of the Dudêran tribe and had a population of 76 in 2021.

The hamlet of Taş is attached to the village.
