= Oğulcak, Bitlis =

Village in Turkey

Oğulcak
- Village
- Location in Turkey
- Coordinates: 38.2905°N 42.1641°E
- Country: Turkey
- Province: Bitlis
- District: Bitlis
- Time zone: UTC+3 (TRT)

Oğulcak is a village in the Bitlis District of Bitlis Province in Turkey.
