= Uçankuş, Bitlis =

Village in Bitlis Province, Turkey

Uçankuş
- Village
- Location in Turkey
- Coordinates: 38.240°N 42.049°E
- Country: Turkey
- Province: Bitlis
- District: Bitlis
- Population (2021): 16
- Time zone: UTC+3 (TRT)

Uçankuş (Kurdish: Leylekan) is a village in the Bitlis District of Bitlis Province in Turkey. The village is populated by Kurds of the Dimilî tribe and had a population of 16 in 2021.
