= Dikme, Bitlis =

Village in Turkey

Dikme
- Village
- Location in Turkey
- Coordinates: 38.224°N 42.061°E
- Country: Turkey
- Province: Bitlis
- District: Bitlis
- Population (2021): 6
- Time zone: UTC+3 (TRT)

Dikme (Kurdish: Sap) is a village in the Bitlis District of Bitlis Province in Turkey. The village is populated by Kurds of the Dimilî tribe and had a population of 6 in 2021.

The hamlets of Aşağı Dikme and Yukarı Dikme are attached to the village.
