= Kömüryakan, Bitlis =

Village in Turkey

Kömüryakan
- Village
- Location in Turkey
- Coordinates: 38°26′N 41°59′E
- Country: Turkey
- Province: Bitlis
- District: Bitlis
- Population (2021): 274
- Time zone: UTC+3 (TRT)

Kömüryakan is a village in the Bitlis District of Bitlis Province in Turkey. Its population is 274 (2021).
