= Beşkaynak, Bitlis =

Village in Turkey

Beşkaynak
- Village
- Location in Turkey
- Coordinates: 38°15′20″N 42°03′45″E
- Country: Turkey
- Province: Bitlis
- District: Bitlis
- Population (2021): 36
- Time zone: UTC+3 (TRT)

Beşkaynak is a village in the Bitlis District of Bitlis Province in Turkey. Its population is 36 (2021).
