= Kınalı, Bitlis =

Village in Turkey

Kınalı
- Village
- Location in Turkey
- Coordinates: 38.236°N 42.038°E
- Country: Turkey
- Province: Bitlis
- District: Bitlis
- Population (2021): 26
- Time zone: UTC+3 (TRT)

Kınalı is a village in the Bitlis District of Bitlis Province in Turkey. The village is populated by Kurds of the Dimilî tribe and had a population of 26 in 2021.

The hamlet of Bayırlı is attached to the village.
