= Ünaldı, Bitlis =

Village in Turkey

Ünaldı
- Village
- Country: Turkey
- Province: Bitlis
- District: Bitlis
- Population (2021): 121
- Time zone: UTC+3 (TRT)

Ünaldı is a village in the Bitlis District of Bitlis Province in Turkey. Its population is 121 (2021).
