= Konuksayar, Bitlis =

Village in Turkey

Konuksayar
- Village
- Country: Turkey
- Province: Bitlis
- District: Bitlis
- Population (2021): 425
- Time zone: UTC+3 (TRT)

Konuksayar is a village in the Bitlis District of Bitlis Province in Turkey. Its population is 425 (2021).
