= Khachkar =

Carved, memorial stele bearing a cross

Armenian cross-stones art. Symbolism and craftsmanship of Khachkars
- UNESCO Intangible Cultural Heritage
- Country: Armenia
- Reference: 00434
- Region: Europe and North America

Inscription history
- Inscription: 2010 (5th session)
- List: Representative

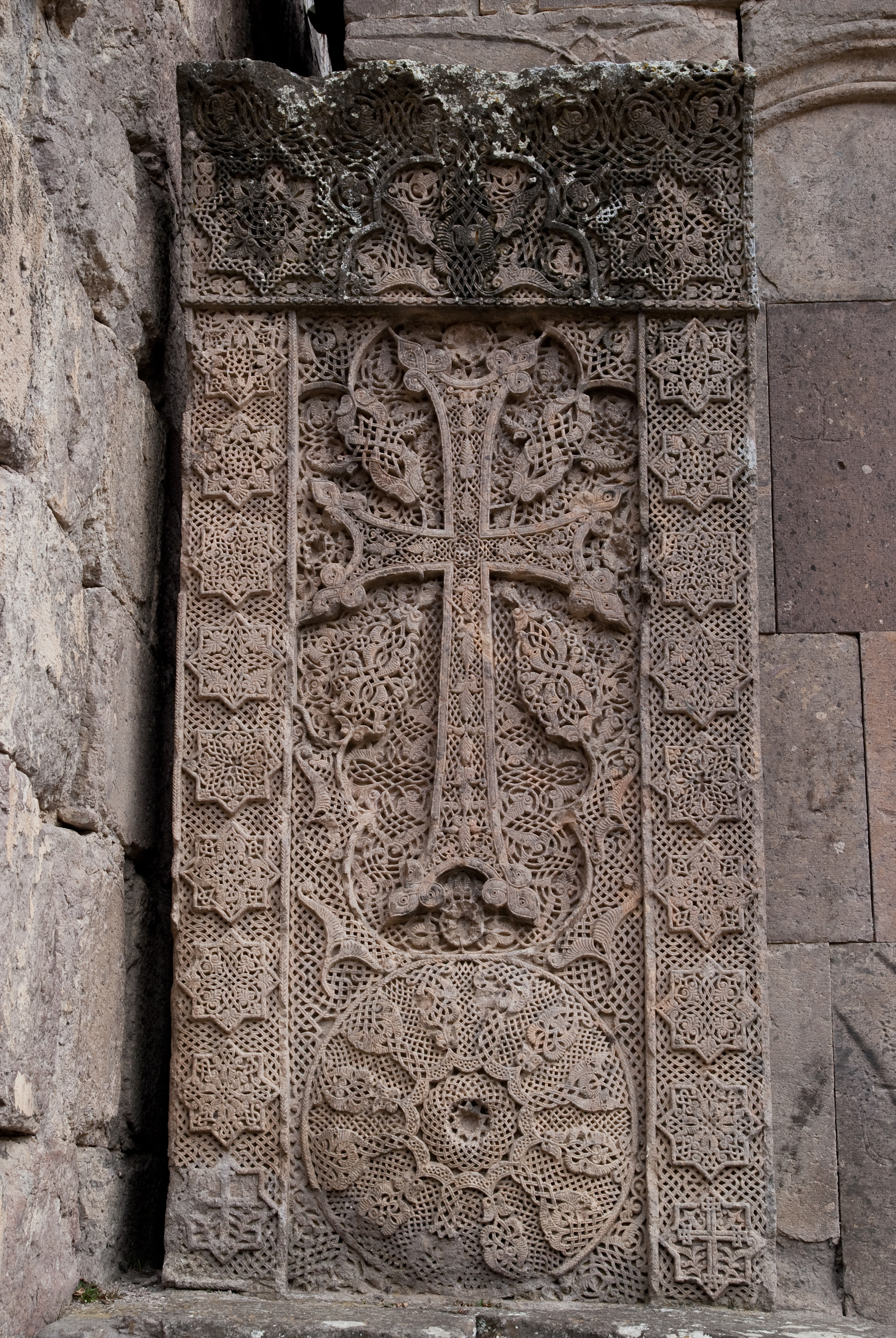
Khachkar at Goshavank, carved in 1291 by Poghos

A khachkar (also spelled as khatchkar) or Armenian cross-stone (Armenian: խաչքար, pronounced [χɑtʃʰˈkʰɑɾ], խաչ xačʿ "cross" + քար kʿar "stone") is a carved, memorial stele bearing a cross, and often with additional motifs such as rosettes, interlaces, and botanical motifs. Khachkars are characteristic of medieval Christian Armenian art.

Since 2010, khachkars, their symbolism and craftsmanship are inscribed in the UNESCO list of Intangible Cultural Heritage.

== Description ==
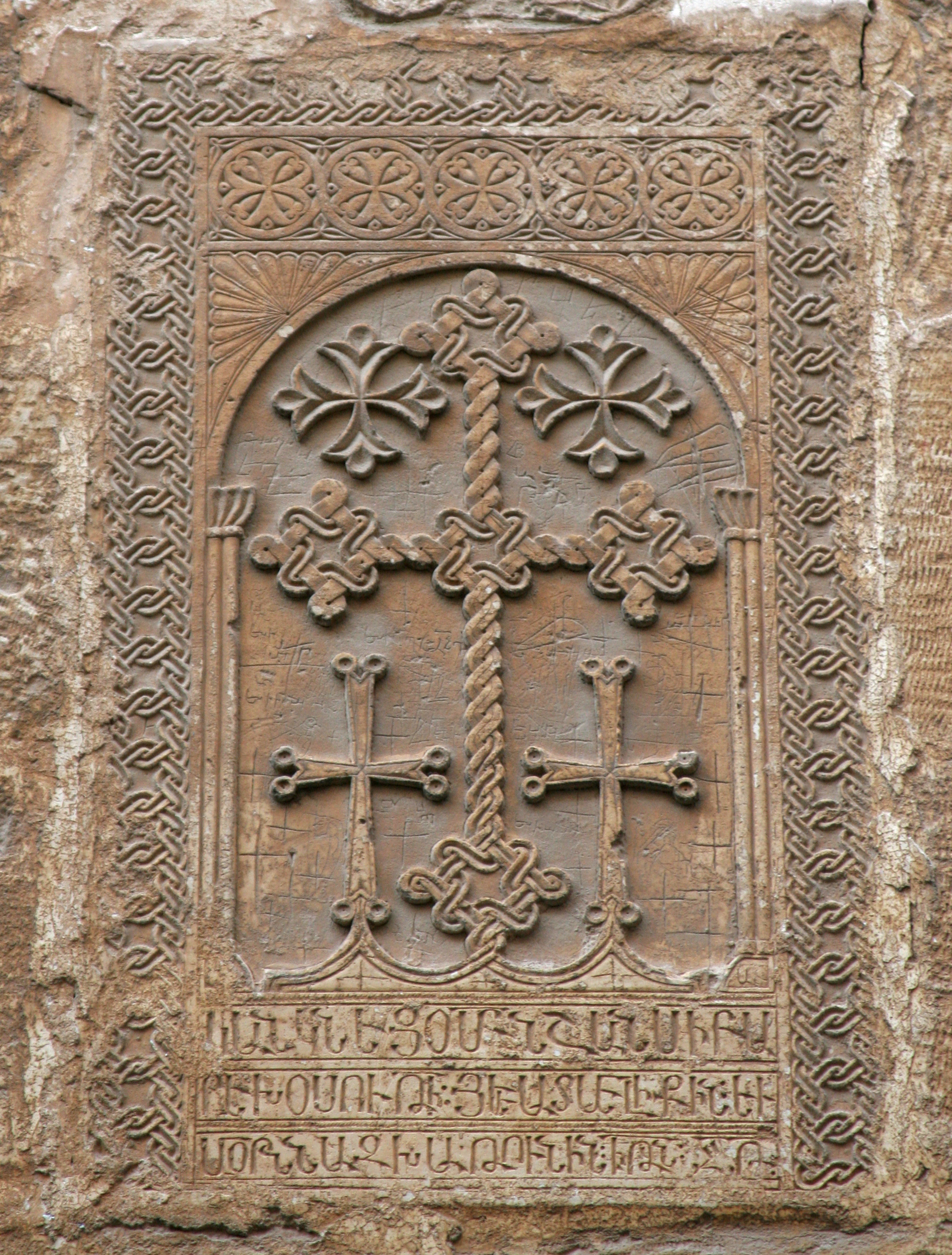
A 15th century khachkar at the Armenian Cathedral of Saint James, Jerusalem

The most common khachkar feature is a cross surmounting a rosette or a solar disc. The remainder of the stone face is typically filled with elaborate patterns of leaves, grapes, pomegranates, and bands of interlace. Occasionally a khachkar is surmounted by a cornice sometimes containing biblical or saintly figures.

Most early khachkars were erected for the salvation of the soul of either a living or a deceased person. Otherwise they were intended to commemorate a military victory, the construction of a church, or as a form of protection from natural disasters.

The most common location for early khachkars was in a graveyard. However, Armenian gravestones take many other forms, and only a minority are khachkars.

== History ==
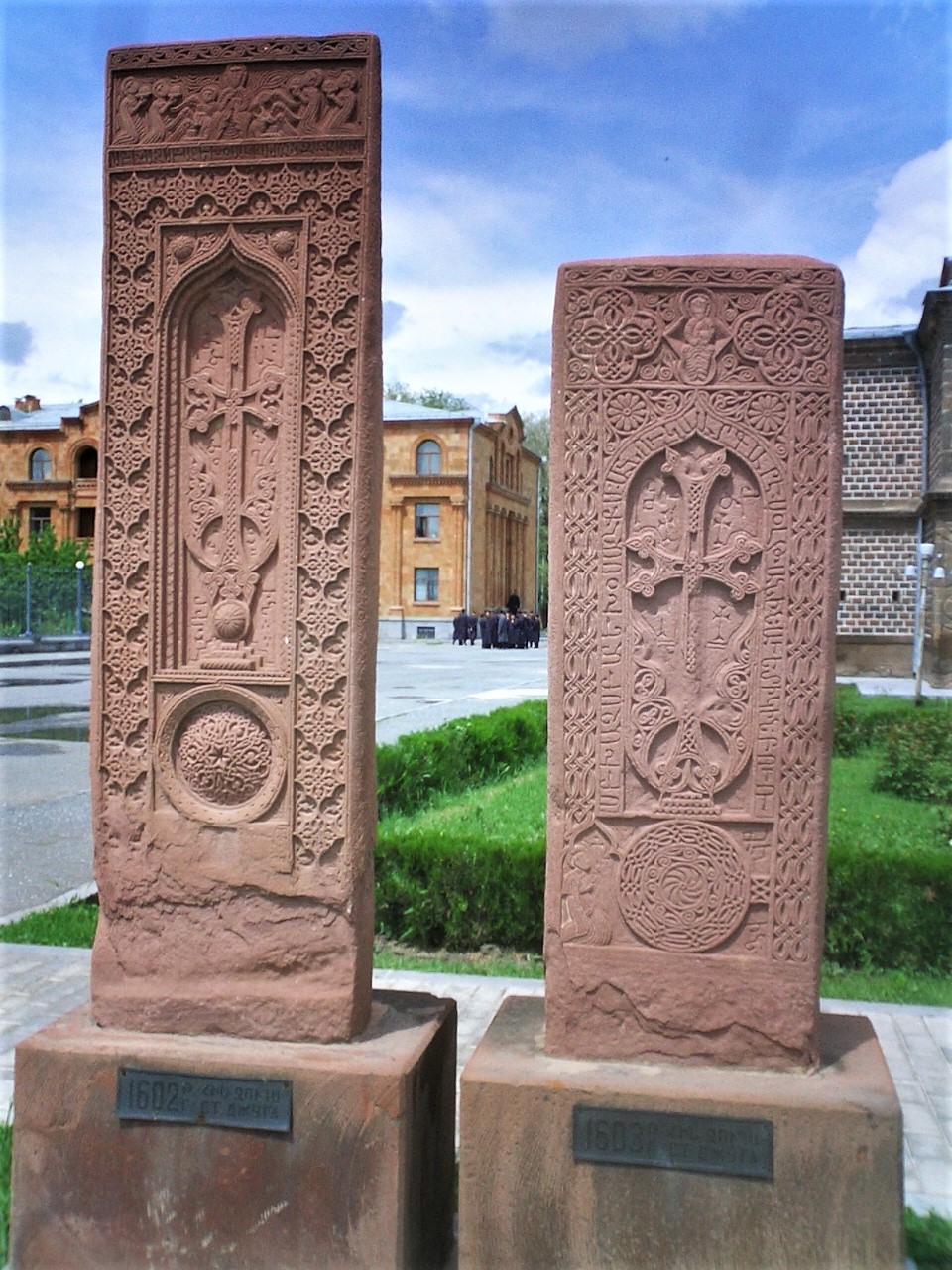
Two 16th century Julfa khachkars in Etchmiadzin, removed from the Julfa graveyard before its destruction by Azerbaijan.

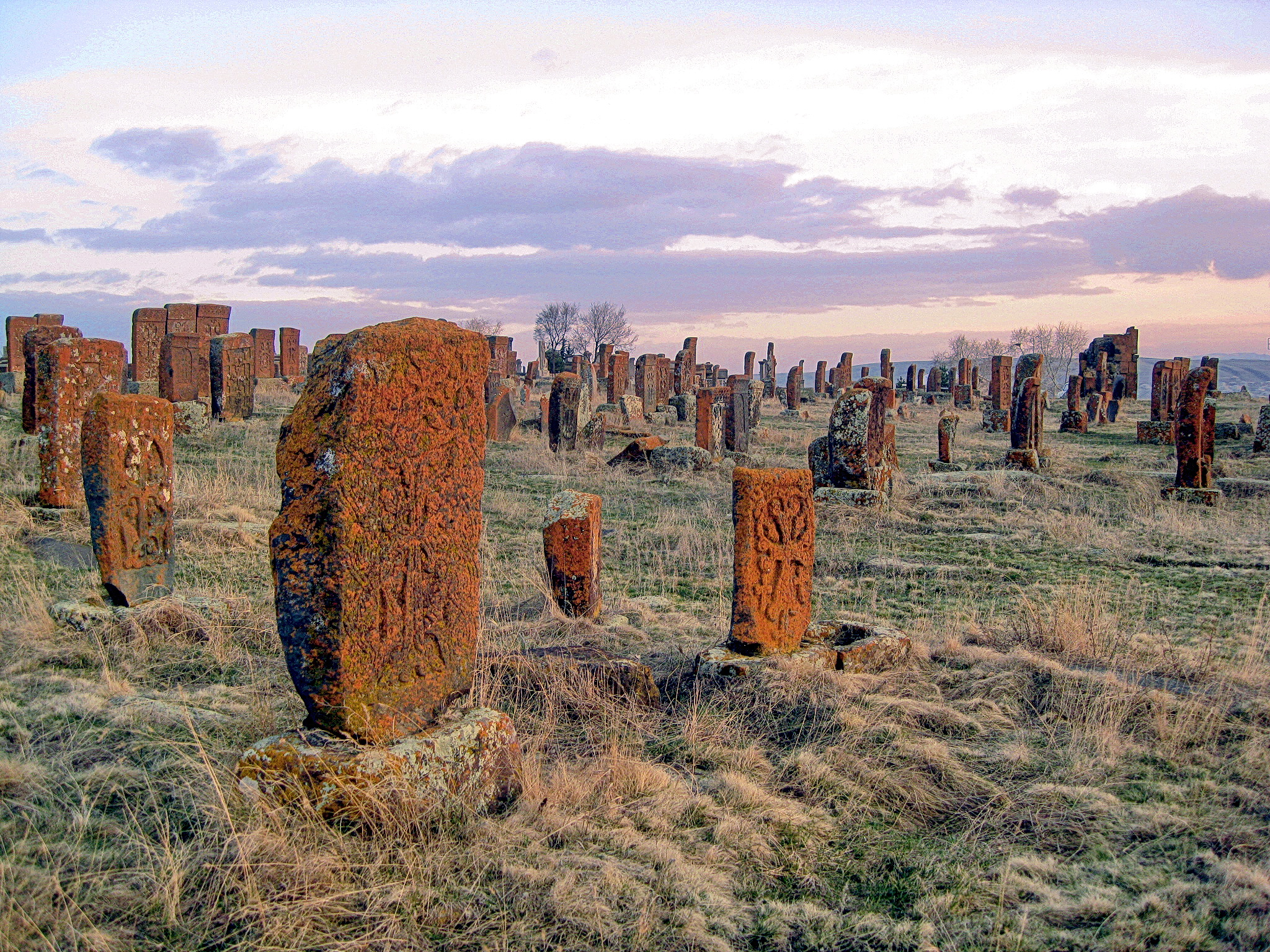
Khachkars appear in large numbers in the Noratus cemetery.

The first true khachkars appeared in the 9th century, during the time of Armenian revival after liberation from Arab rule. The oldest khachkar with a known date was carved in 879 (though earlier, cruder, examples exist). Erected in Garni, it is dedicated to queen Katranide I, the wife of king Ashot I Bagratuni. The peak of the khachkar carving art was between the 12th and the 14th centuries. The art declined during the Mongol invasion at the end of the 14th century. It revived in the 16th and 17th centuries, but the artistic heights of the 14th century were never achieved again. Today, the tradition still remains, and one can still see khachkar carvers in some parts of Yerevan.

About 40,000 khachkars survive today. Most of them are free standing, though those recording donations are usually built into monastery walls. The following three khachkars are believed to be the finest examples of the art form:

- One in Geghard, carved in 1213, probably by master Timot and master Mkhitar
- The Holy Redeemer khachkar in Haghpat (see gallery), carved in 1273 by master Vahram
- A khachkar in Goshavank, carved in 1291 by master Poghos.

A number of good examples have been transferred to the Historical Museum in Yerevan and beside the cathedral in Echmiadzin. The largest surviving collection of khachkars is in Armenia, at Noraduz cemetery on the western shore of the Lake Sevan, where an old graveyard with around 900 khachkars from various periods and of various styles can be seen. The largest number was formerly located at the Armenian cemetery in Julfa in the Nakhichevan Autonomous Republic of Azerbaijan, which contained approximately 10,000 khachkars in 1648. The number of khachkars dwindled over time through destruction of various causes until the only 2,700 khachkars remained in 1998, when the Azerbaijani government embarked on a systematic campaign destroying and leveling the entire medieval cemetery between 1998 and 2005.

== Present ==
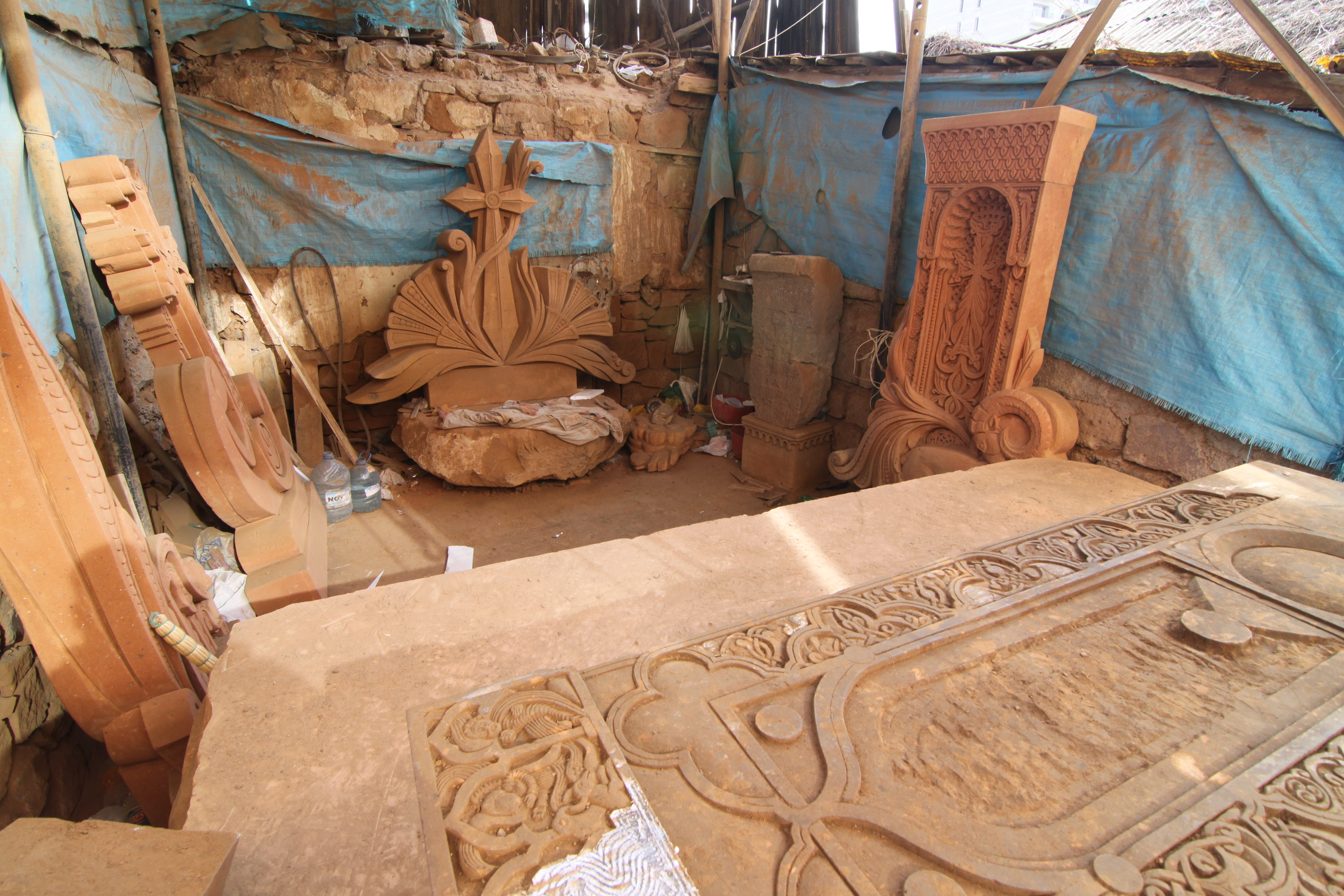
A modern-day khachkar carver's workshop in downtown Yerevan.

The art of carving khachkars has witnessed a rebirth as a symbol of Armenian culture in the 20th century.

There are hundreds of khachkars worldwide, many of which are memorials to commemorate the victims of the Armenian genocide. Khachkars have been placed in a multitude of locations, including at the Vatican Museums, Canterbury Cathedral's memorial garden, St Mary's Cathedral, Sydney, Colorado State Capitol, Temple of Peace, Cardiff, Christ Church Cathedral, Dublin, and elsewhere.

According to one count, there are nearly 30 khachkars on public locations in France. Some 20 khachkars are located in Poland, which is home to an important Armenian community since the Late Middle Ages.

Armenian khachkars have been acquired or donated to many museums or temporarily represented at significant exhibitions all around the world such as at the British Museum (donated by Vazgen I in 1977), the Metropolitan Museum of Art or the Special Exhibition of the National Museum of Ethnology, Osaka, Japan.

== Endangered khachkars ==
A large portion of khachkars, which were created in historic Armenia and surrounding regions, in modern times are now located in Turkey, Azerbaijan, Georgia and Iran. As a result of systematic eradication of khachkars in Turkey since the Armenian Genocide, today only a few examples survive. These few survivors are not cataloged and properly photographed. Thus, it is difficult to follow up with the current situation. One documented example of such destruction took place in the Armenian Cemetery in Jugha, in Nakhchivan. The government of Azerbaijan has denied claims that members of the Azerbaijani Armed Forces smashed the khachkars with sledgehammers in December 2005. The destruction of khachkars was despite a 2000 UNESCO order demanding their protection, in what has been termed "the worst cultural genocide of the 21st century."

One source says that khachkars are being damaged, neglected, or moved in Armenia. Reasons cited for moving these khachkars include; decoration, to create new holy places, or to make space for new burials.

== Types ==
Amenaprkich (Armenian: Ամէնափրկիչ, meaning Holy Saviour) is a particular type of khachkar in which on the cross is a depiction of the crucified Christ. Only a few such designs are known, and most date from the late 13th century. One of the few such surviving khachkars today is located in the Sevanavank monastery, which also depicts scenes from the Bible.

== Gallery ==
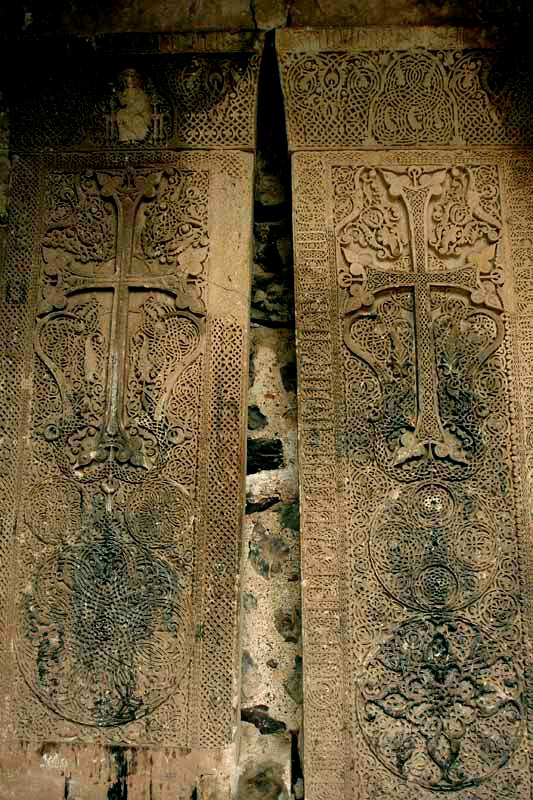
13th century Armenian-inscribed double khachkars of the Memorial Bell-Tower of the Dadivank Monastery

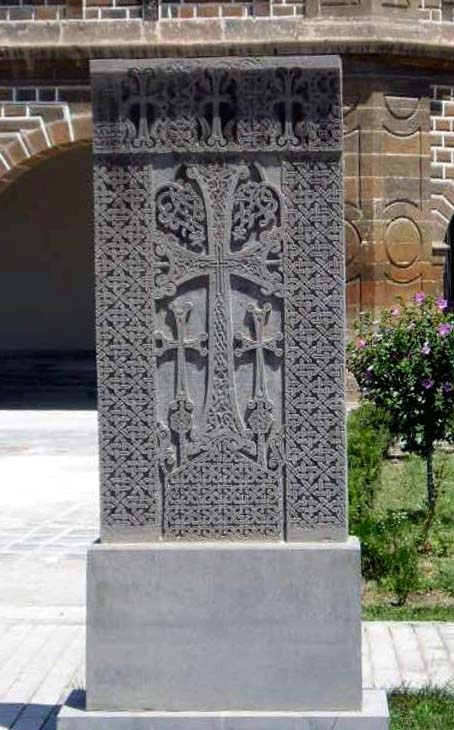
A khachkar behind the cathedral in Echmiadzin, Armenia. Place of origin is unknown.

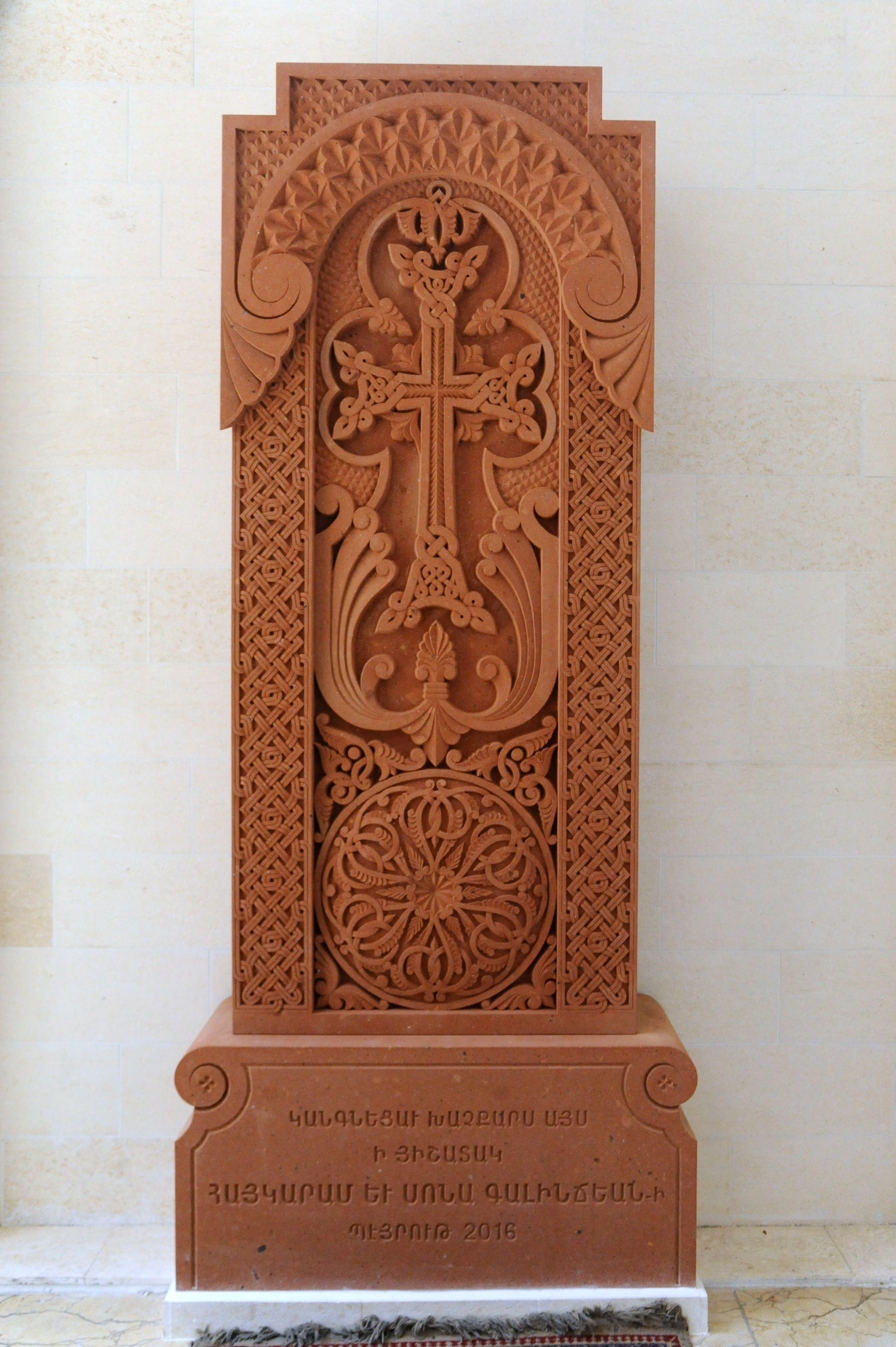
A modern khachkar at Sourp Kevork church- Beirut, Lebanon (2016)

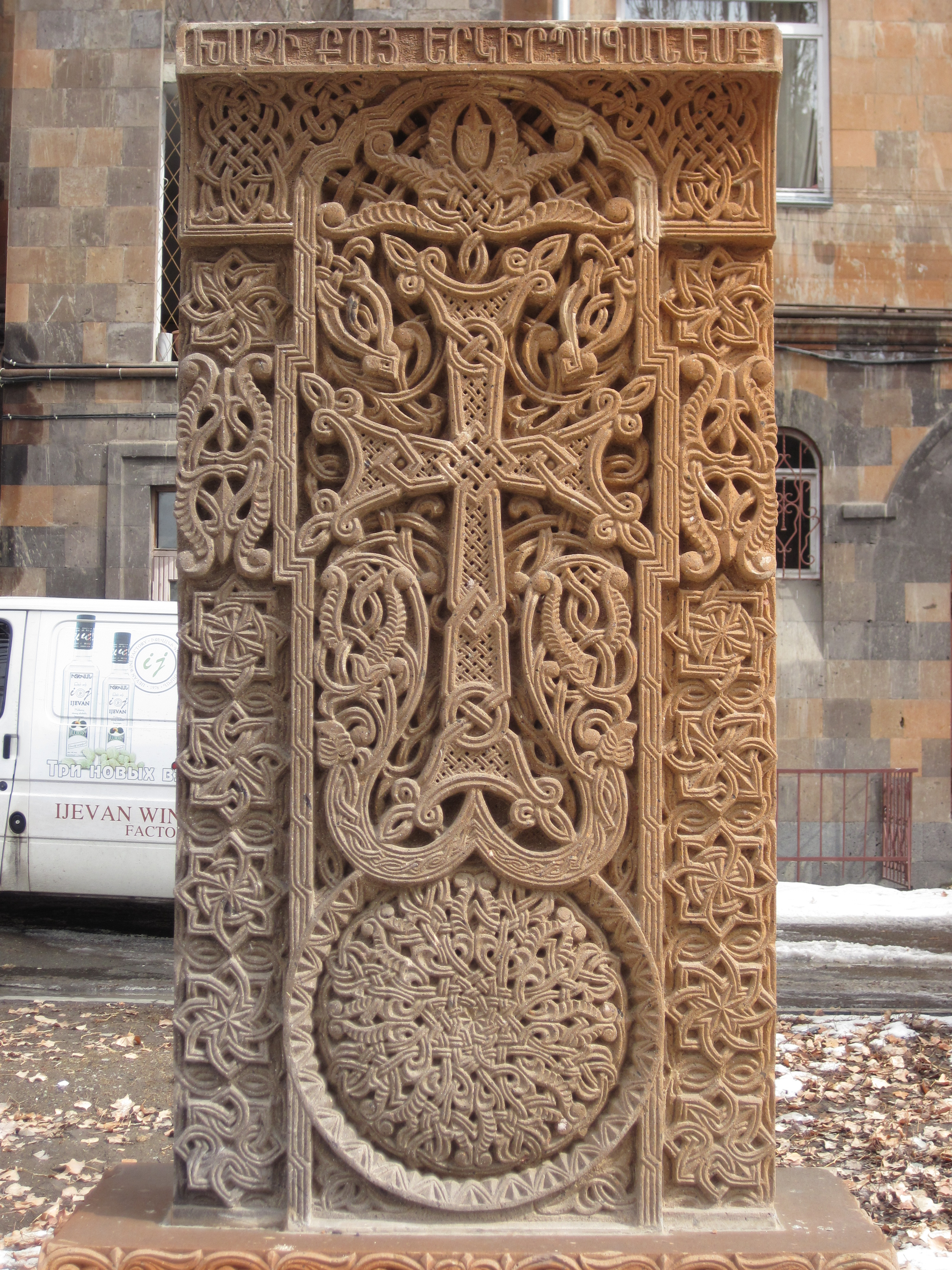
Khachkar in Gyumri

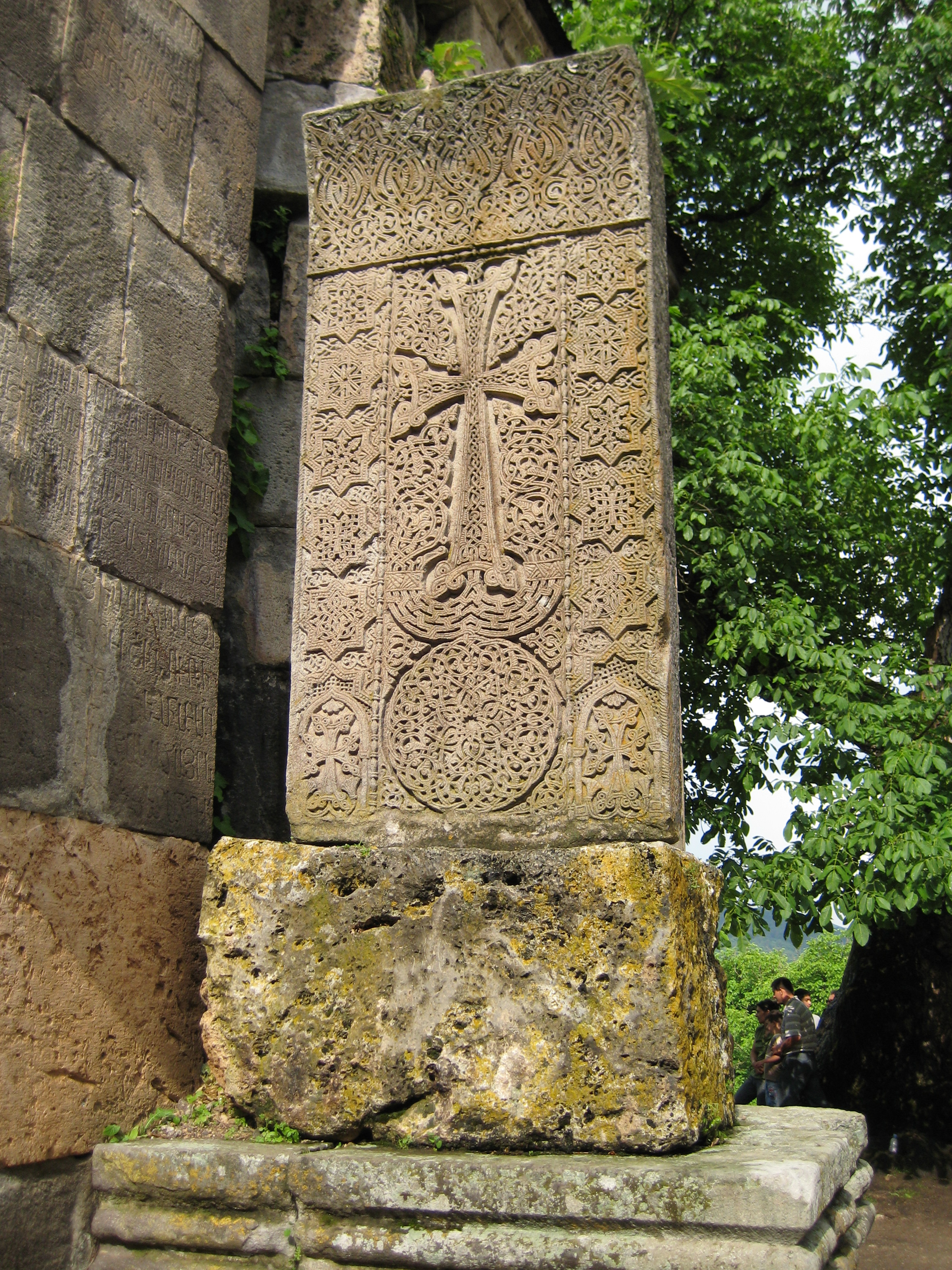
Khachkar at Haghartsin Monastery, near Dilijan, Armenia.

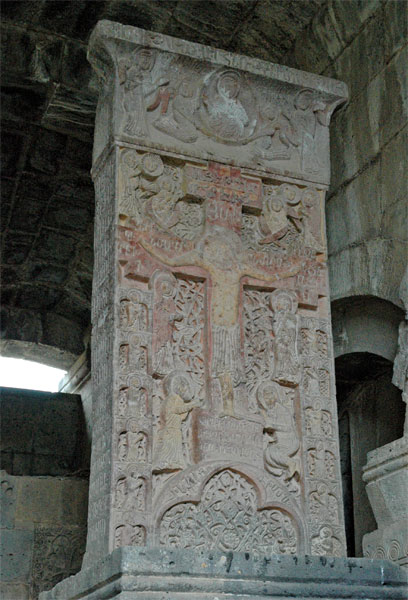
The Holy Savior khachkar in Haghpat (1273)

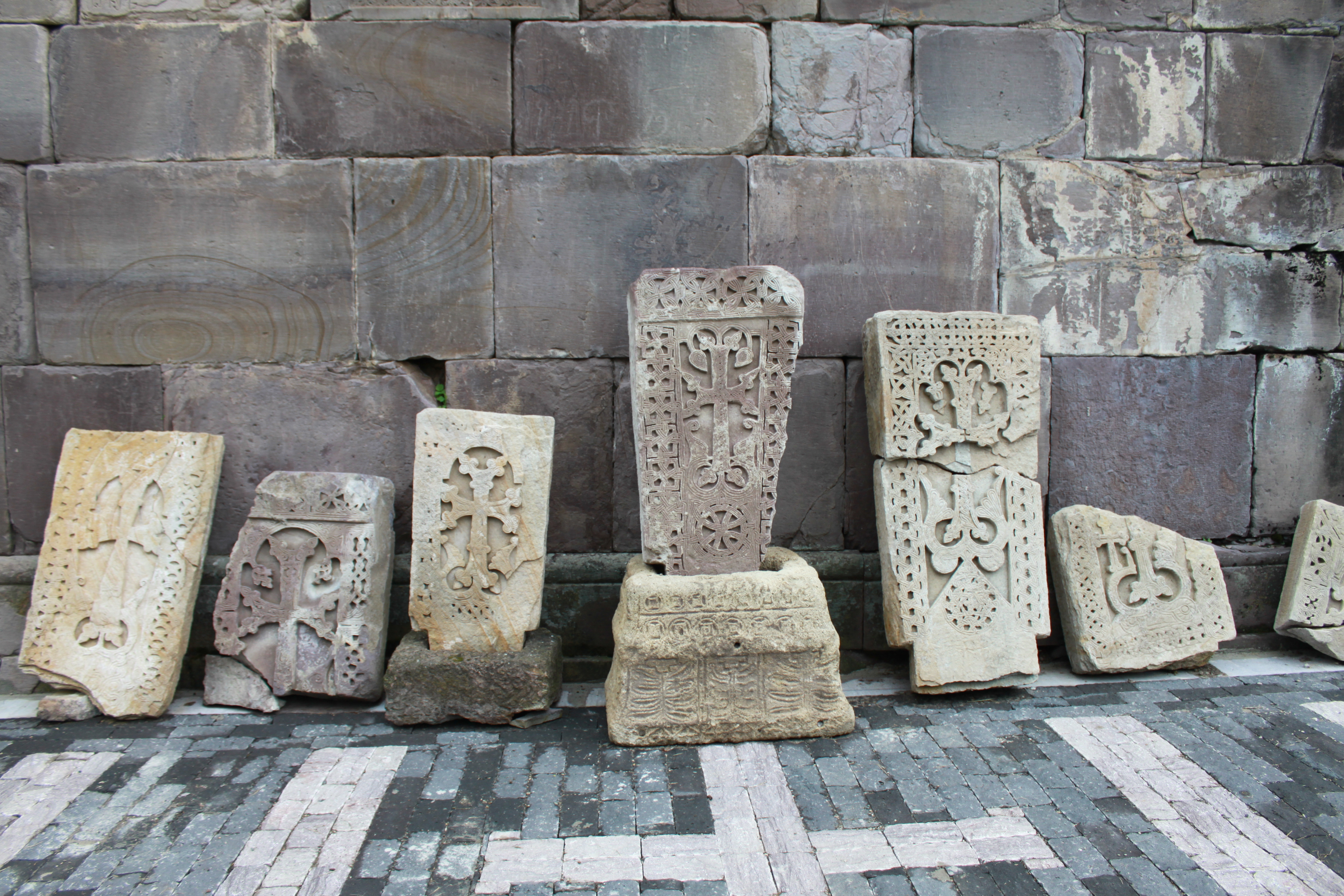
Various khachkars at Makaravank Monastery in Armenia

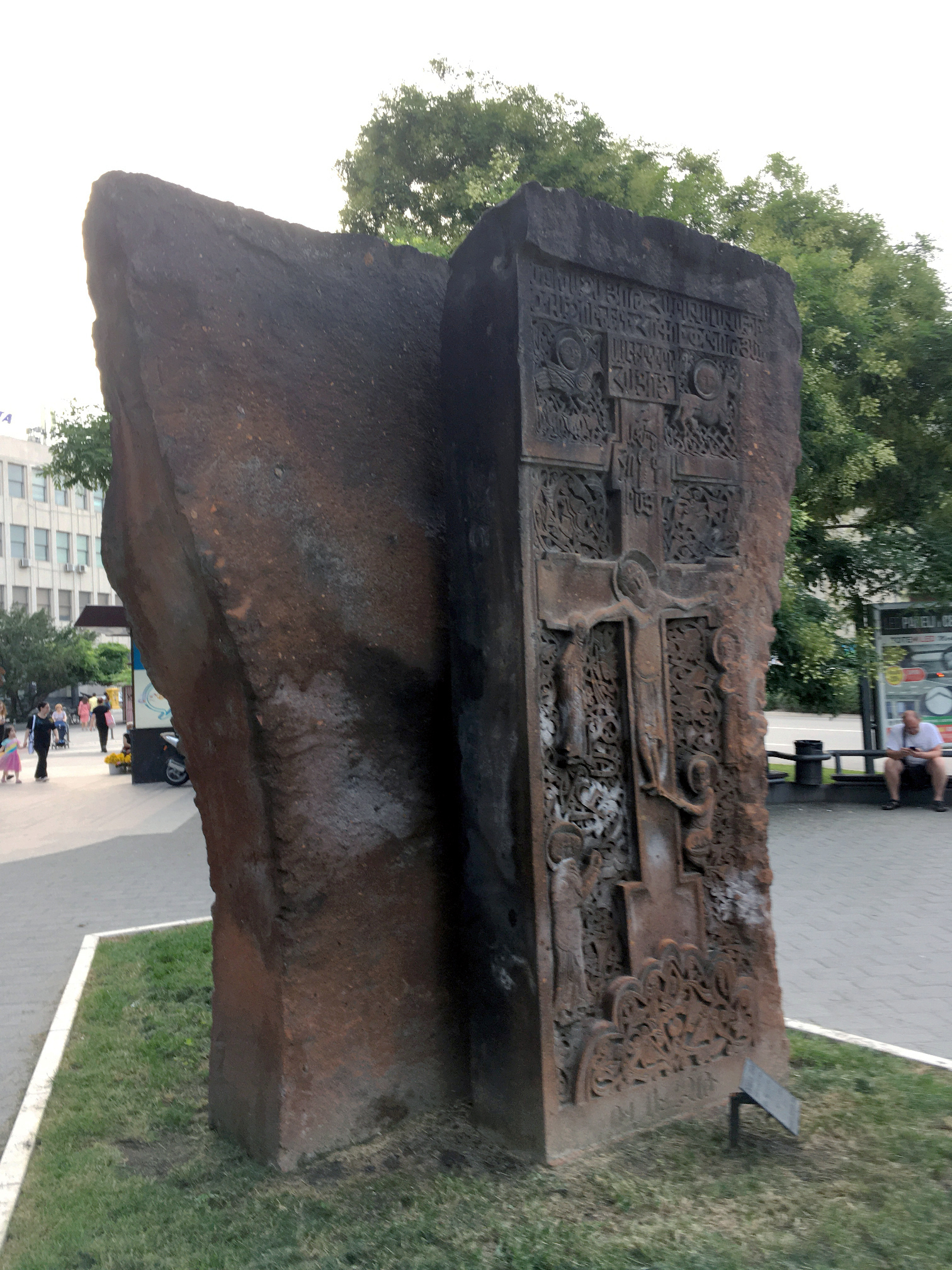
Khachkar in Novi Sad, Serbia

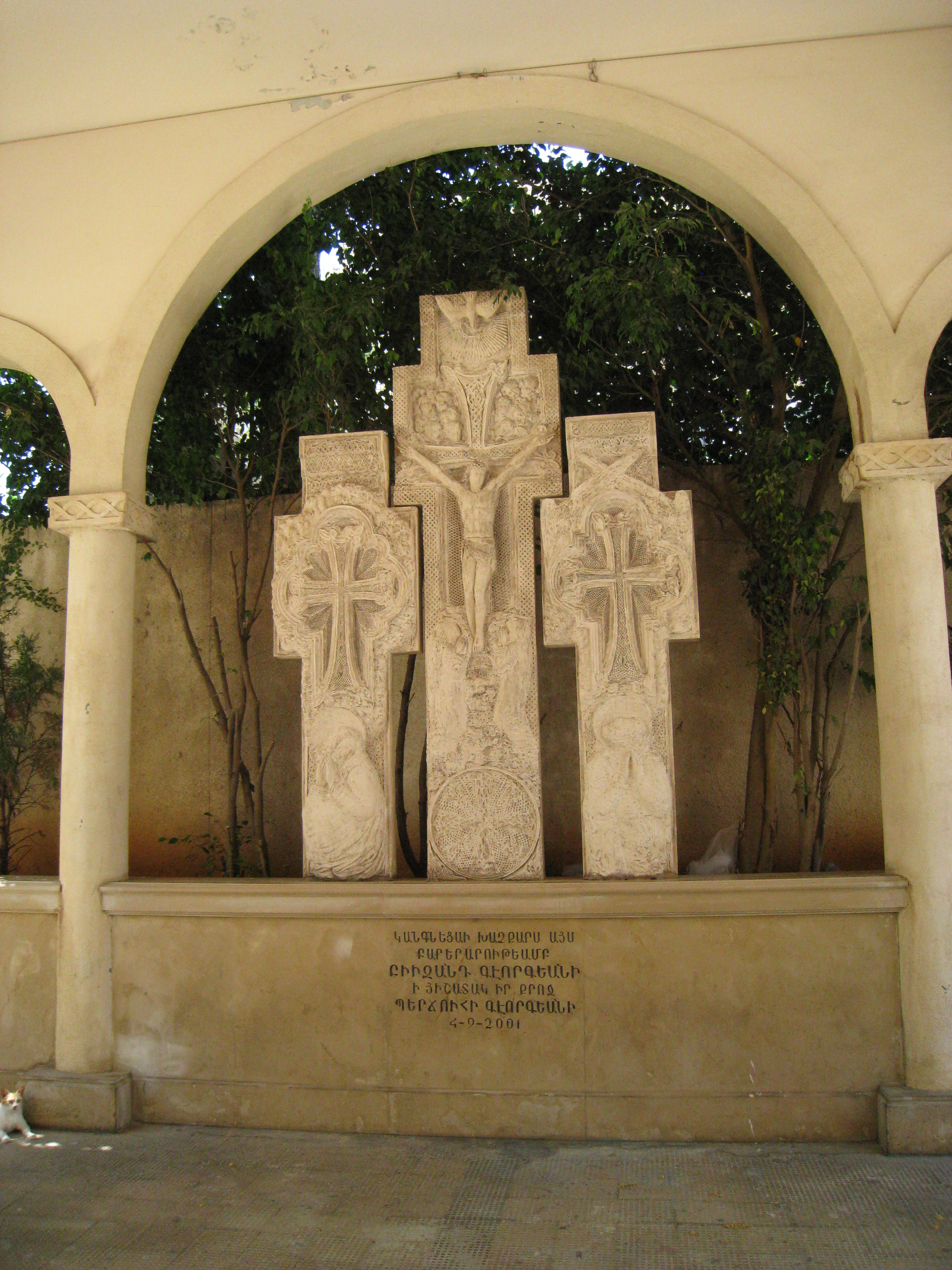
A modern Amenaprkich-type khatchkar with two others at the Surb Nshan Catherdral in downtown Beirut, Lebanon (2001)

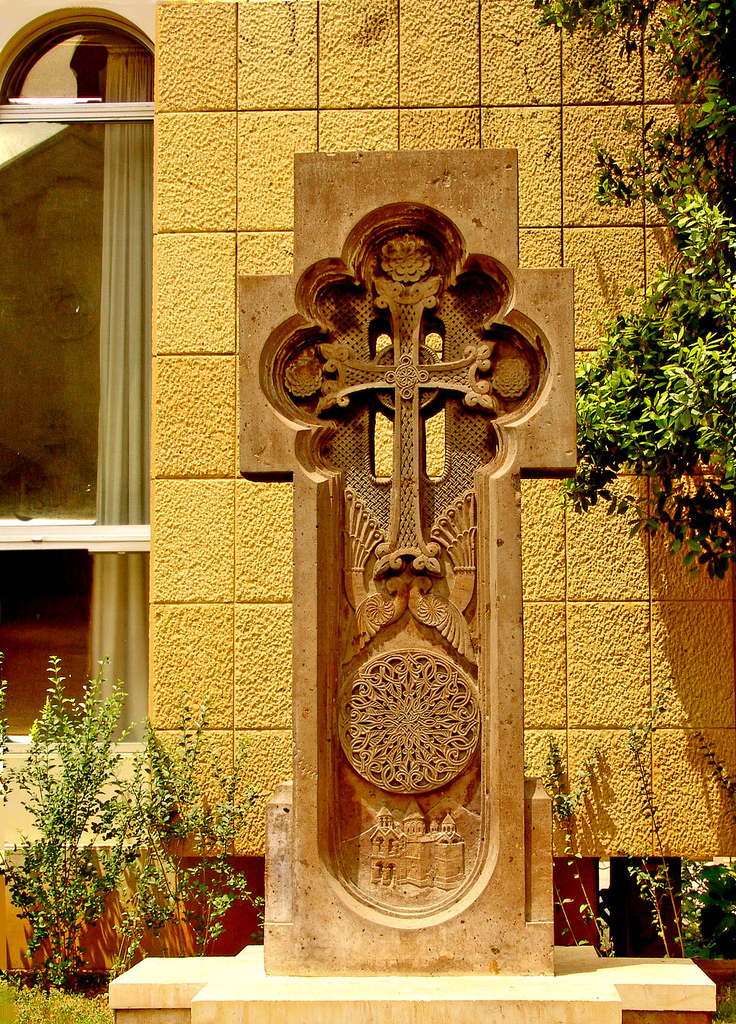
A modern khackhar at the Armenian Catholicossate of Cilicia in Antelias, Lebanon

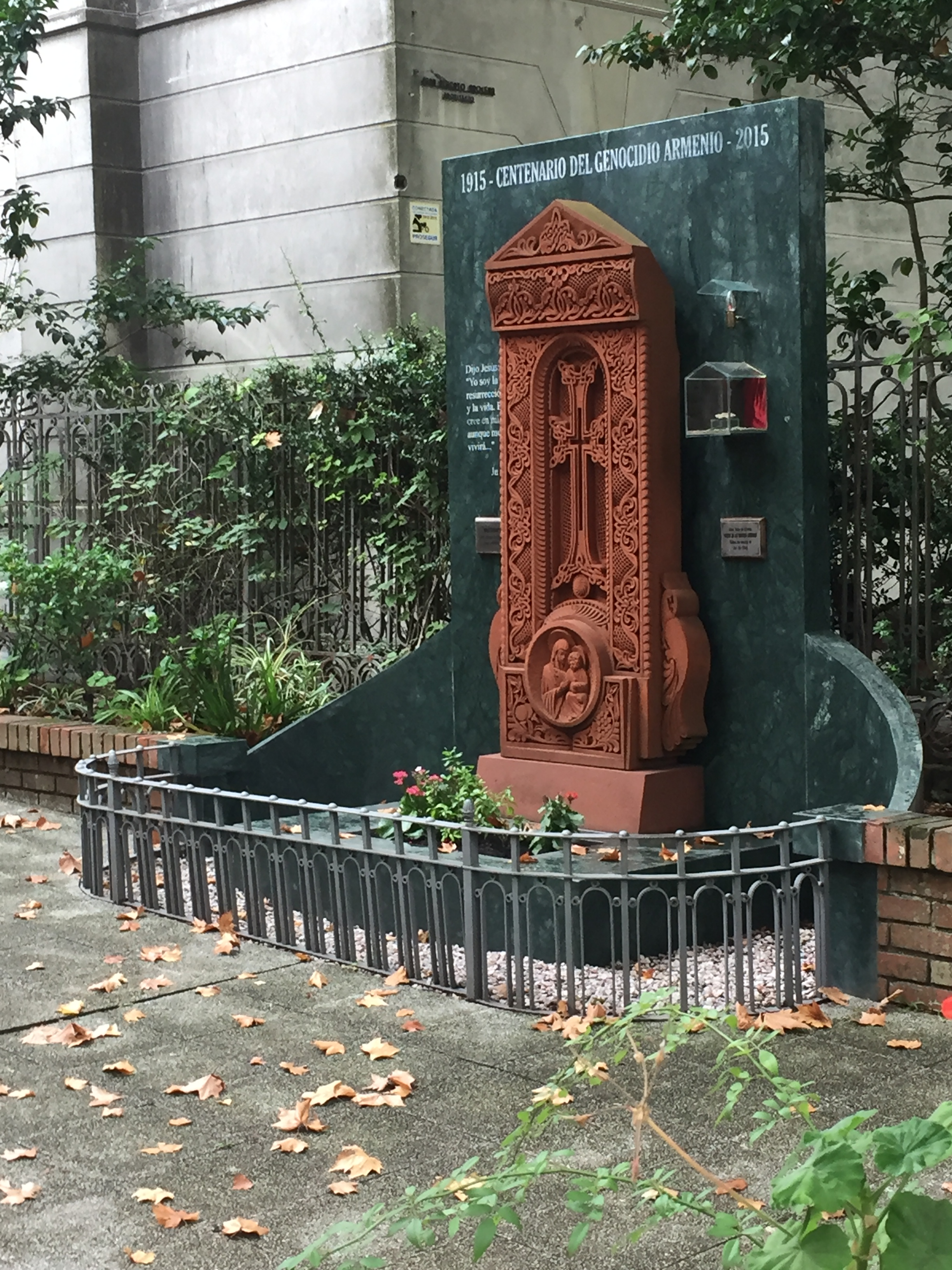
A khatchkar at the entrance of the Armenian Catholic Cathedral of Our Lady of Bzommar, Montevideo

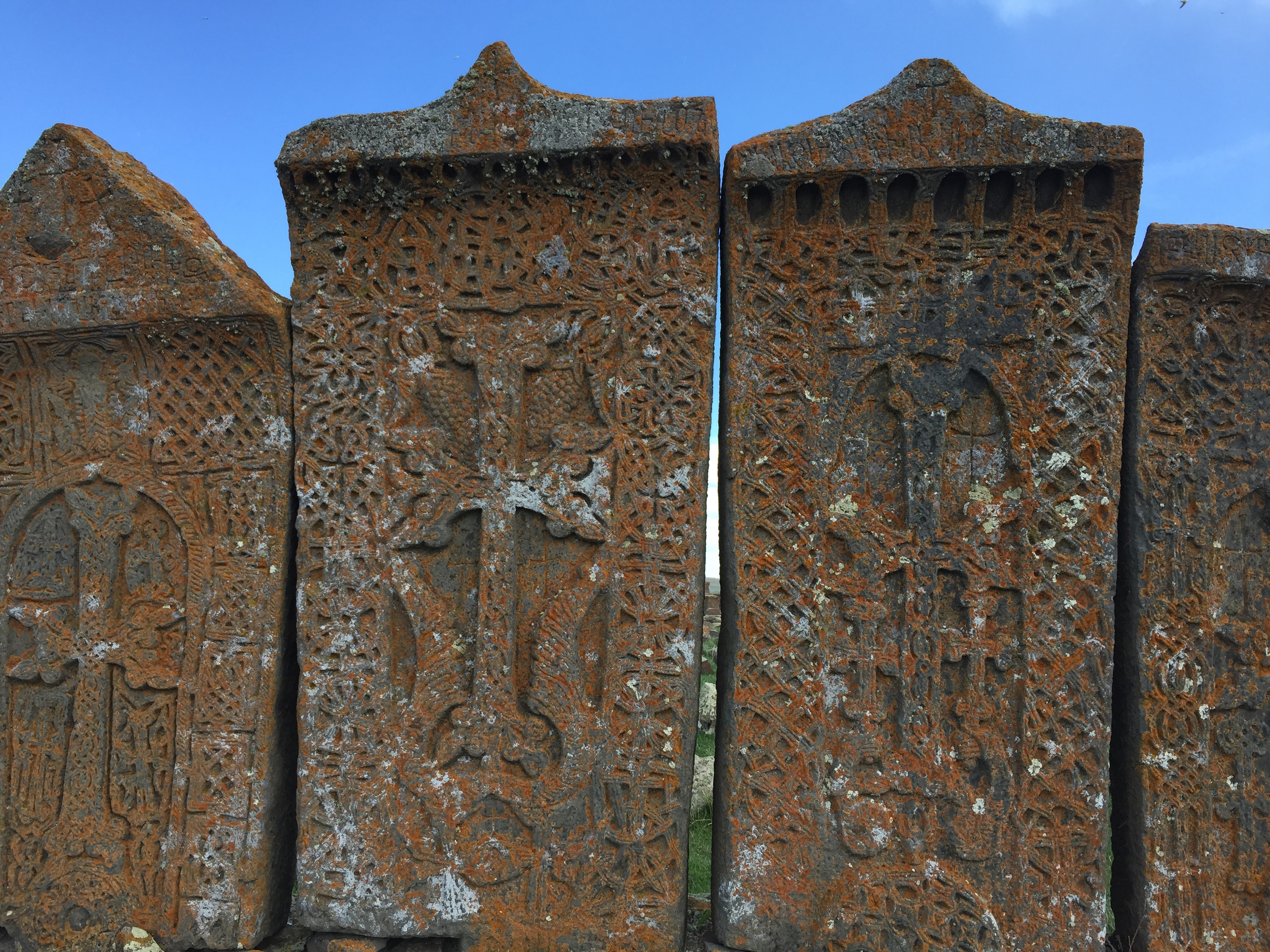
Armenian Khachkar

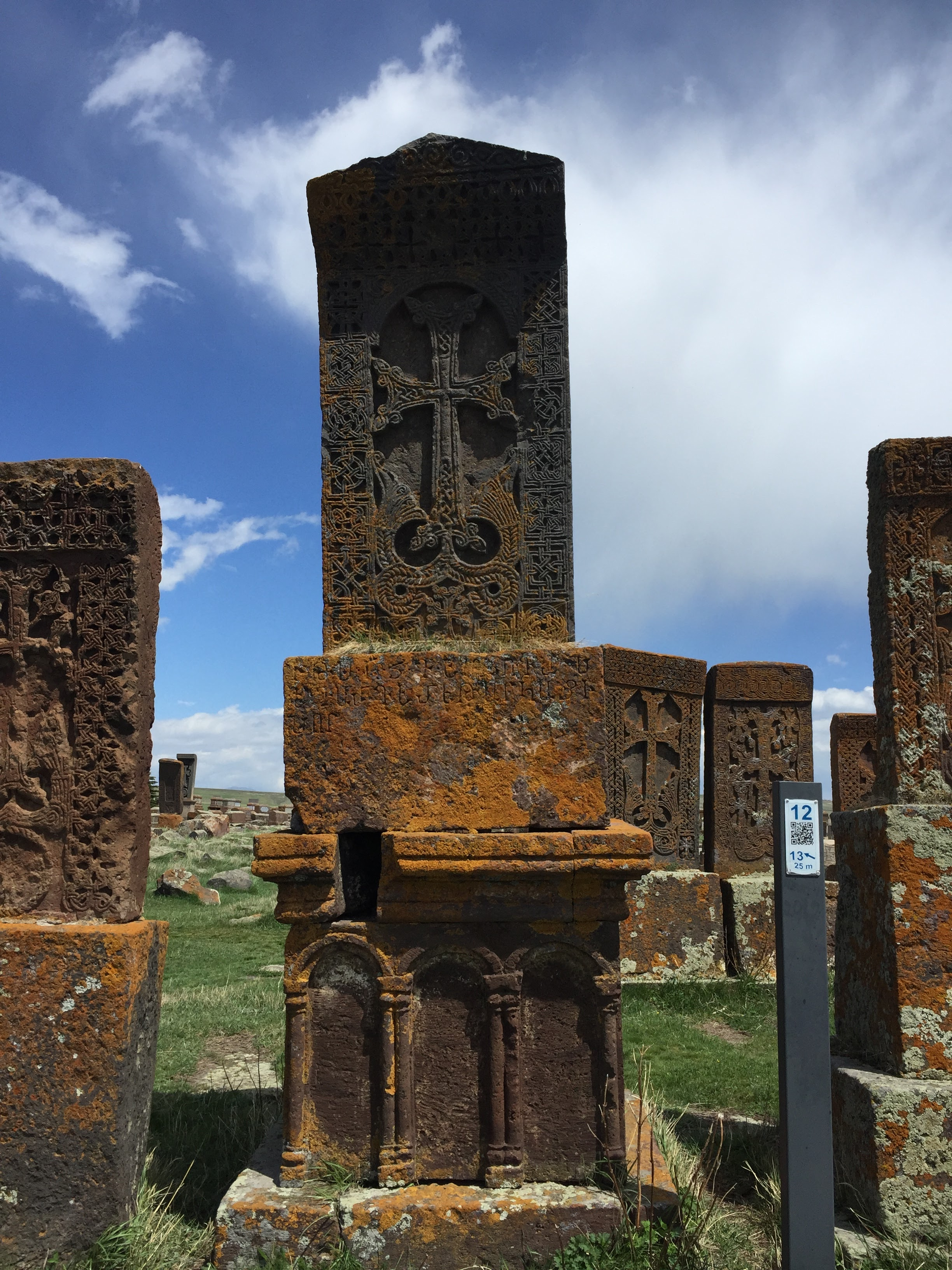
Armenian Khachkar

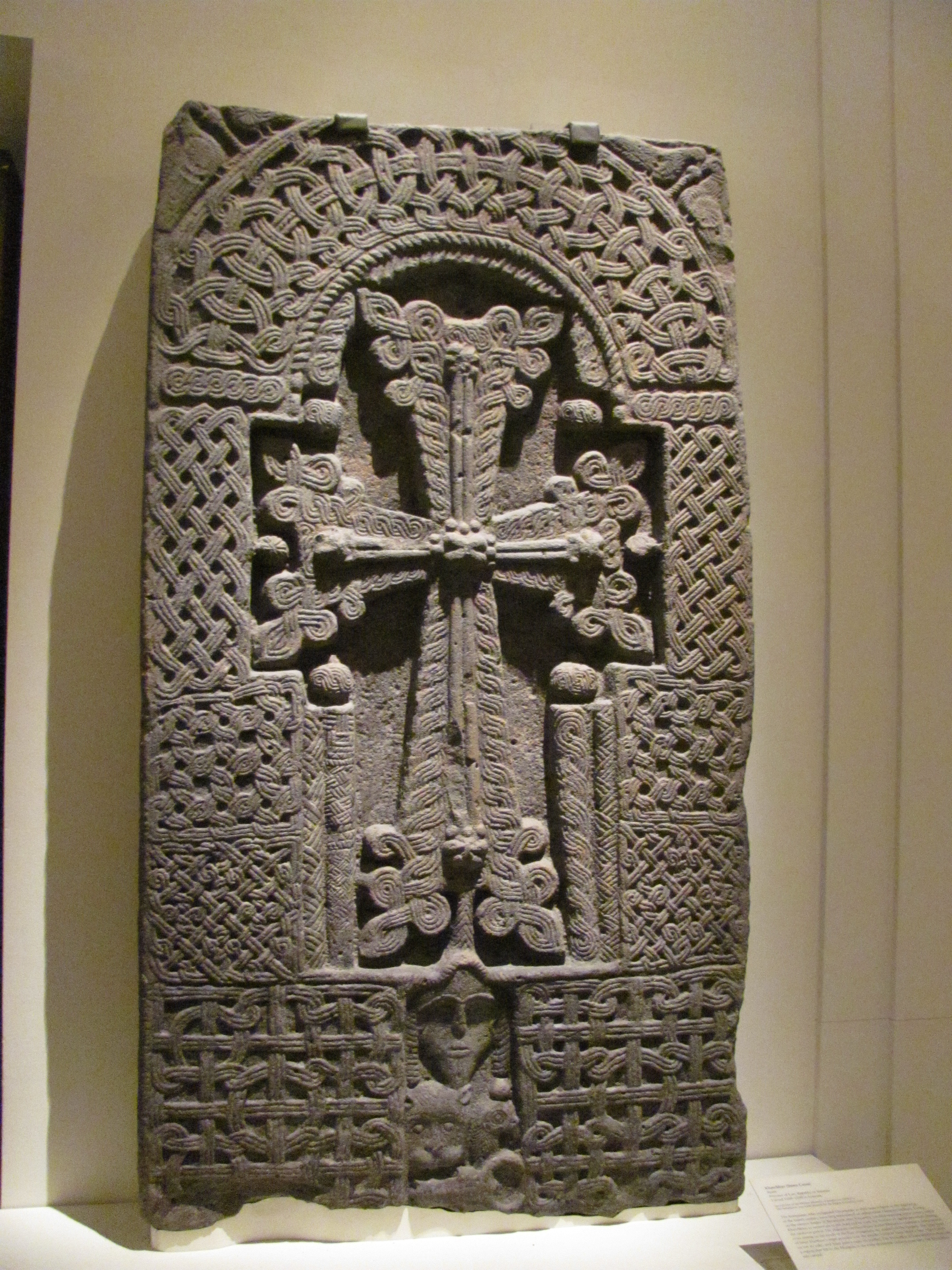
Khachkar in Metropolitan Museum of Art, New York City, USA

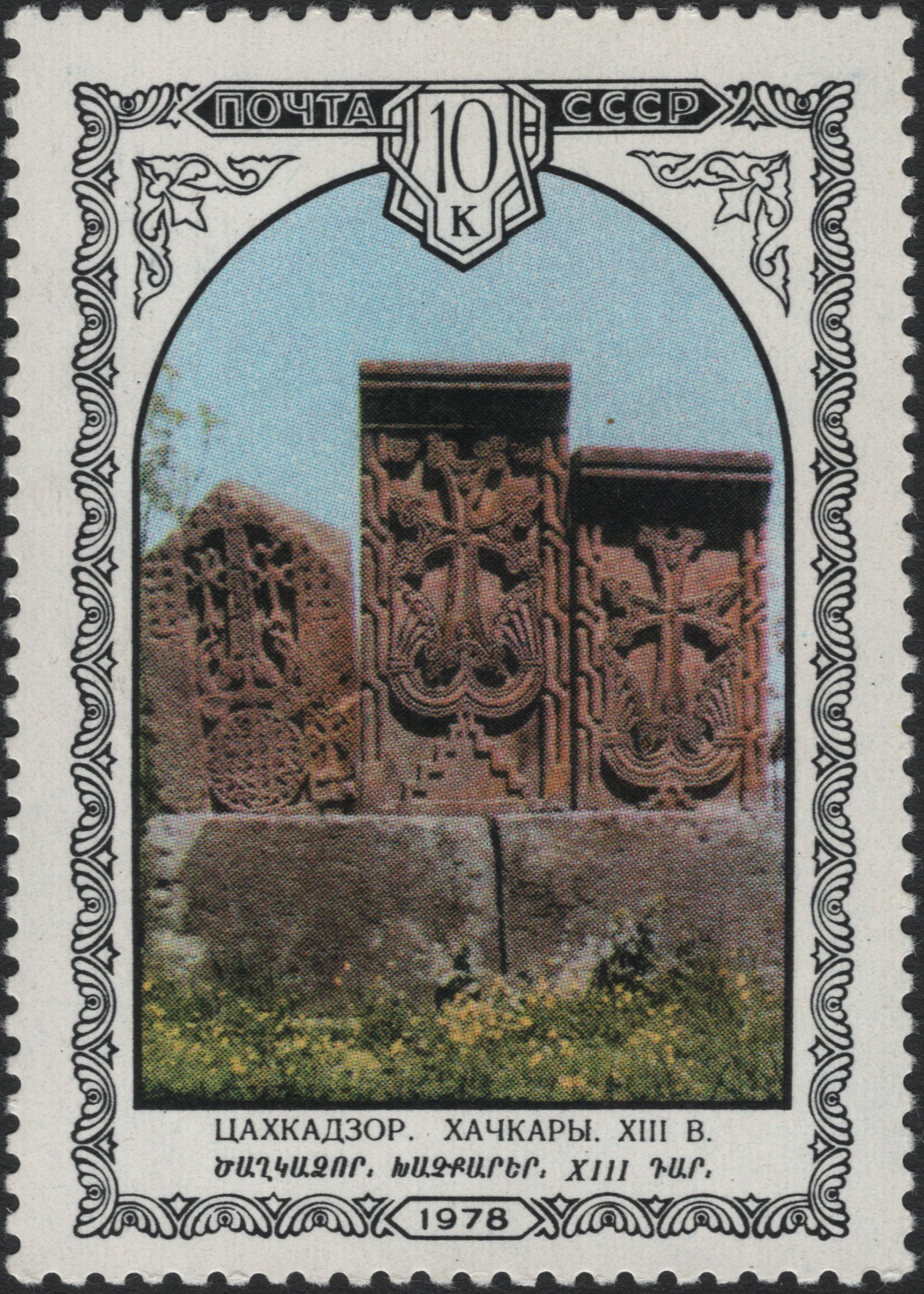
Khachkars, Tsaghkadzor, 13th century

== See also ==
- Değirmenaltı - village in Turkey containing preserved khachkars
- Trei Ierarhi Monastery - a 17th-century church in Iași, Romania, decorated with Khachkar motifs
- High cross - Monumental Celtic crosses.
- Preaching cross - Monumental crosses used as open air pulpits
- Hill of Crosses - A hill in Lithuania covered with ornamental crosses.
