= Ağaçdere, Bitlis =

Village in Turkey

Ağaçdere
- Village
- Location in Turkey
- Coordinates: 38.3229°N 42.0503°E
- Country: Turkey
- Province: Bitlis
- District: Bitlis
- Population (2021): 114
- Time zone: UTC+3 (TRT)

Ağaçdere is a village in the Bitlis District of Bitlis Province in Turkey. Its population is 114 (2021).
