= Aşağıkaraboy, Bitlis =

Village in Turkey

Aşağıkaraboy
- Village
- Location in Turkey
- Coordinates: 38°28′07″N 41°58′09″E
- Country: Turkey
- Province: Bitlis
- District: Bitlis
- Population (2021): 463
- Time zone: UTC+3 (TRT)

Aşağıkaraboy is a village in the Bitlis District of Bitlis Province in Turkey. Its population is 463 (2021).
