= Çayırbaşı, Bitlis =

Village in Turkey

Çayırbaşı
- Village
- Country: Turkey
- Province: Bitlis
- District: Bitlis
- Population (2021): 21
- Time zone: UTC+3 (TRT)

Çayırbaşı is a village in the Bitlis District of Bitlis Province in Turkey. Its population is 21 (2021).
