= Kokarsu, Bitlis =

Village in Turkey

Kokarsu
- Village
- Location in Turkey
- Coordinates: 38°22′51″N 42°15′33″E
- Country: Turkey
- Province: Bitlis
- District: Bitlis
- Population (2021): 175
- Time zone: UTC+3 (TRT)

Kokarsu is a village in the Bitlis District of Bitlis Province in Turkey. Its population is 175 (2021).
