= İçgeçit, Bitlis =

Village in Bitlis Province, Turkey

İçgeçit
- Village
- Location in Turkey
- Coordinates: 38°19′25″N 42°8′11″E
- Country: Turkey
- Province: Bitlis
- District: Bitlis
- Population (2021): 163
- Time zone: UTC+3 (TRT)

İçgeçit (Kurdish: Xumaç) is a village in the Bitlis District of Bitlis Province in Turkey. The village is populated by Kurds and had a population of 163 in 2021.

It was burned by authorities in 1995, during the Kurdish–Turkish conflict.
