= Kayabaşı, Bitlis =

Village in Turkey

Kayabaşı
- Village
- Location within Turkey
- Country: Turkey
- Province: Bitlis
- District: Bitlis
- Population (2021): 102
- Time zone: UTC+3 (TRT)

Kayabaşı is a village in the Bitlis District of Bitlis Province in Turkey. Its population is 102 (2021).
