= Aşağıölek, Bitlis =

Village in Turkey

Aşağıölek
- Village
- Location in Turkey
- Coordinates: 38°18′23″N 42°08′24″E
- Country: Turkey
- Province: Bitlis
- District: Bitlis
- Population (2021): 42
- Time zone: UTC+3 (TRT)

Aşağıölek is a village in the Bitlis District of Bitlis Province in Turkey. Its population is 42 (2021).
