= Doğruyol, Bitlis =

Village in Turkey

Doğruyol
- Village
- Location in Turkey
- Coordinates: 38.299°N 42.227°E
- Country: Turkey
- Province: Bitlis
- District: Bitlis
- Population (2021): 253
- Time zone: UTC+3 (TRT)

Doğruyol is a village in the Bitlis District of Bitlis Province in Turkey. Its population is 253 (2021).
