= Ayrancılar, Bitlis =

Village in Turkey

Ayrancılar
- Village
- Location in Turkey
- Coordinates: 38.2003°N 41.8789°E
- Country: Turkey
- Province: Bitlis
- District: Bitlis
- Population (2021): 64
- Time zone: UTC+3 (TRT)

Ayrancılar (Kurdish: Miryanes) is a village in the Bitlis District of Bitlis Province in Turkey. The village is populated by Kurds and had a population of 64 in 2021.

The village was evacuated in 1992 by the Turkish army.
