= Aşağıbalcılar, Bitlis =

Village in Turkey

Aşağıbalcılar
- Village
- Location in Turkey
- Coordinates: 38.2596°N 42.1705°E
- Country: Turkey
- Province: Bitlis
- District: Bitlis
- Population (2021): 15
- Time zone: UTC+3 (TRT)

Aşağıbalcılar is a village in the Bitlis District of Bitlis Province in Turkey. Its population is 15 (2021).
