= Başmaklı, Bitlis =

Village in Turkey

Başmaklı
- Village
- Location in Turkey
- Coordinates: 38°16′N 42°12′E
- Country: Turkey
- Province: Bitlis
- District: Bitlis
- Population (2021): 171
- Time zone: UTC+3 (TRT)

Başmaklı is a village in the Bitlis District of Bitlis Province in Turkey. Its population is 171 (2021).
