= Bölükyazı, Bitlis =

Village in Turkey

Bölükyazı
- Village
- Location in Turkey
- Coordinates: 38.3307°N 42.1766°E
- Country: Turkey
- Province: Bitlis
- District: Bitlis
- Population (2021): 696
- Time zone: UTC+3 (TRT)

Bölükyazı is a village in the Bitlis District of Bitlis Province in Turkey. Its population is 696 (2021).
