= Ilıcak, Bitlis =

Village in Turkey

Ilıcak
- Village
- Location in Turkey
- Coordinates: 38°17′30″N 42°11′1″E
- Country: Turkey
- Province: Bitlis
- District: Bitlis
- Population (2021): 16
- Time zone: UTC+3 (TRT)

Ilıcak is a village in the Bitlis District of Bitlis Province in Turkey. Its population is 16 (2021).
