= Esenburun, Bitlis =

Village in Turkey

Esenburun
- Village
- Location in Turkey
- Coordinates: 38°13′16″N 42°02′23″E
- Country: Turkey
- Province: Bitlis
- District: Bitlis
- Population (2022): 0
- Time zone: UTC+3 (TRT)

Esenburun (Kurdish: Hivanis) is a village in the Bitlis District of Bitlis Province in Turkey. The village is unpopulated as of 2022.

It was formerly populated by Kurds and burned by authorities in the 1990s during the Kurdish–Turkish conflict.
