= Döşkaya, Bitlis =

Village in Turkey

Döşkaya
- Village
- Country: Turkey
- Province: Bitlis
- District: Bitlis
- Population (2021): 15
- Time zone: UTC+3 (TRT)

Döşkaya is a village in the Bitlis District of Bitlis Province in Turkey. Its population is 15 (2021).
