= Tanrıyar, Bitlis =

Village in Turkey

Tanrıyar
- Village
- Location in Turkey
- Coordinates: 38°14′N 41°52′E
- Country: Turkey
- Province: Bitlis
- District: Bitlis
- Population (2021): 241
- Time zone: UTC+3 (TRT)

Tanrıyar is a village in the Bitlis District of Bitlis Province in Turkey. Its population is 241 (2021).
