= Yarönü, Bitlis =

Village in Turkey

Yarönü
- Village
- Location in Turkey
- Coordinates: 38°14′35″N 42°04′10″E
- Country: Turkey
- Province: Bitlis
- District: Bitlis
- Population (2021): 25
- Time zone: UTC+3 (TRT)

Yarönü is a village in the Bitlis District of Bitlis Province in Turkey. Its population is 25 (2021).
