= Bayramalan, Bitlis =

Village in Turkey

Bayramalan
- Village
- Location in Turkey
- Coordinates: 38°20′24″N 42°07′41″E
- Country: Turkey
- Province: Bitlis
- District: Bitlis
- Population (2021): 110
- Time zone: UTC+3 (TRT)

Bayramalan is a village in the Bitlis District of Bitlis Province in Turkey. Its population is 110 (2021).
