= Yolcular, Bitlis =

Village in Turkey

Yolcular
- Village
- Country: Turkey
- Province: Bitlis
- District: Bitlis
- Population (2021): 448
- Time zone: UTC+3 (TRT)

Yolcular is a village in the Bitlis District of Bitlis Province in Turkey. Its population is 448 (2021).
