= Yolağzı, Bitlis =

Village in Turkey

Yolağzı
- Village
- Location in Turkey
- Coordinates: 38.3752°N 42.2313°E
- Country: Turkey
- Province: Bitlis
- District: Bitlis
- Population (2021): 44
- Time zone: UTC+3 (TRT)

Yolağzı is a village in the Bitlis District of Bitlis Province in Turkey. Its population is 44 (2021).
