= Çalıdüzü, Bitlis =

Village in Turkey

Çalıdüzü
- Village
- Location in Turkey
- Coordinates: 38.3219°N 42.0969°E
- Country: Turkey
- Province: Bitlis
- District: Bitlis
- Population (2021): 120
- Time zone: UTC+3 (TRT)

Çalıdüzü is a village in the Bitlis District of Bitlis Province in Turkey. Its population is 120 (2021).
