= Narlıdere, Bitlis =

Village in Turkey

Narlıdere
- Village
- Location in Turkey
- Coordinates: 38.228°N 41.895°E
- Country: Turkey
- Province: Bitlis
- District: Bitlis
- Population (2021): 571
- Time zone: UTC+3 (TRT)

Narlıdere (Kurdish: Qesir, Qesrik) is a village in the Bitlis District of Bitlis Province in Turkey. The village is populated by Kurds of the Etmanekî tribe and had a population of 571 in 2021.
