= Başhan, Bitlis =

Village in Turkey

Başhan
- Village
- Location in Turkey
- Coordinates: 38.4691°N 42.1553°E
- Country: Turkey
- Province: Bitlis
- District: Bitlis
- Population (2021): 266
- Time zone: UTC+3 (TRT)

Başhan is a village in the Bitlis District of Bitlis Province in Turkey. Its population is 266 (2021).
