= Koruk, Bitlis =

Village in Turkey

Koruk
- Village
- Country: Turkey
- Province: Bitlis
- District: Bitlis
- Population (2021): 191
- Time zone: UTC+3 (TRT)

Koruk is a village in the Bitlis District of Bitlis Province in Turkey. Its population is 191 (2021).
