= Dereağzı, Bitlis =

Village in Turkey

Dereağzı
- Village
- Location in Turkey
- Coordinates: 38°17′32″N 42°15′17″E
- Country: Turkey
- Province: Bitlis
- District: Bitlis
- Population (2021): 196
- Time zone: UTC+3 (TRT)

Dereağzı is a village in the Bitlis District of Bitlis Province in Turkey. Its population is 196 (2021).
