= Estakhr-e Garuk =

Estakhr-e Garuk استخرگروك
- Village
- Location within Iran
- Coordinates: 29°09′59″N 57°22′50″E
- Country: Iran
- Province: Kerman
- County: Jiroft
- Bakhsh: Sarduiyeh
- Rural District: Sarduiyeh

Population (2006)
  - Total: 18
- Time zone: UTC+3:30 (IRST)
  - Summer (DST): UTC+4:30 (IRDT)

Estakhr-e Garuk (Persian: استخرگروك, also Romanized as Estakhr-e Garūk; also known as Estakhr-e Gorank, Estakhr-e Karnak, Estakhr-e Karūk, and Estakhr Korūk) is a village in Sarduiyeh Rural District, Sarduiyeh District, Jiroft County, Kerman Province, Iran. At the 2006 census, its population was 18, in 5 families.
