= Kavakdibi, Bitlis =

Village in Turkey

Kavakdibi
- Village
- Country: Turkey
- Province: Bitlis
- District: Bitlis
- Population (2021): 212
- Time zone: UTC+3 (TRT)

Kavakdibi is a village in the Bitlis District of Bitlis Province in Turkey. Its population is 212 (2021).
