= Yayalar, Bitlis =

Village in Turkey

Yayalar
- Village
- Location in Turkey
- Coordinates: 38°19′47″N 42°18′39″E
- Country: Turkey
- Province: Bitlis
- District: Bitlis
- Population (2021): 50
- Time zone: UTC+3 (TRT)

Yayalar is a village in the Bitlis District of Bitlis Province in Turkey. Its population is 50 (2021).
