= Ekinli, Bitlis =

Village in Turkey

Ekinli
- Village
- Country: Turkey
- Province: Bitlis
- District: Bitlis
- Population (2021): 171
- Time zone: UTC+3 (TRT)

Ekinli is a village in the Bitlis District of Bitlis Province in Turkey. Its population is 171 (2021).
