= Yaygın, Bitlis =

Village in Turkey

Yaygın
- Village
- Country: Turkey
- Province: Bitlis
- District: Bitlis
- Population (2021): 189
- Time zone: UTC+3 (TRT)

Yaygın is a village in the Bitlis District of Bitlis Province in Turkey. Its population is 189 (2021).
