= List of populated places in Bitlis Province =

Places in Turkey

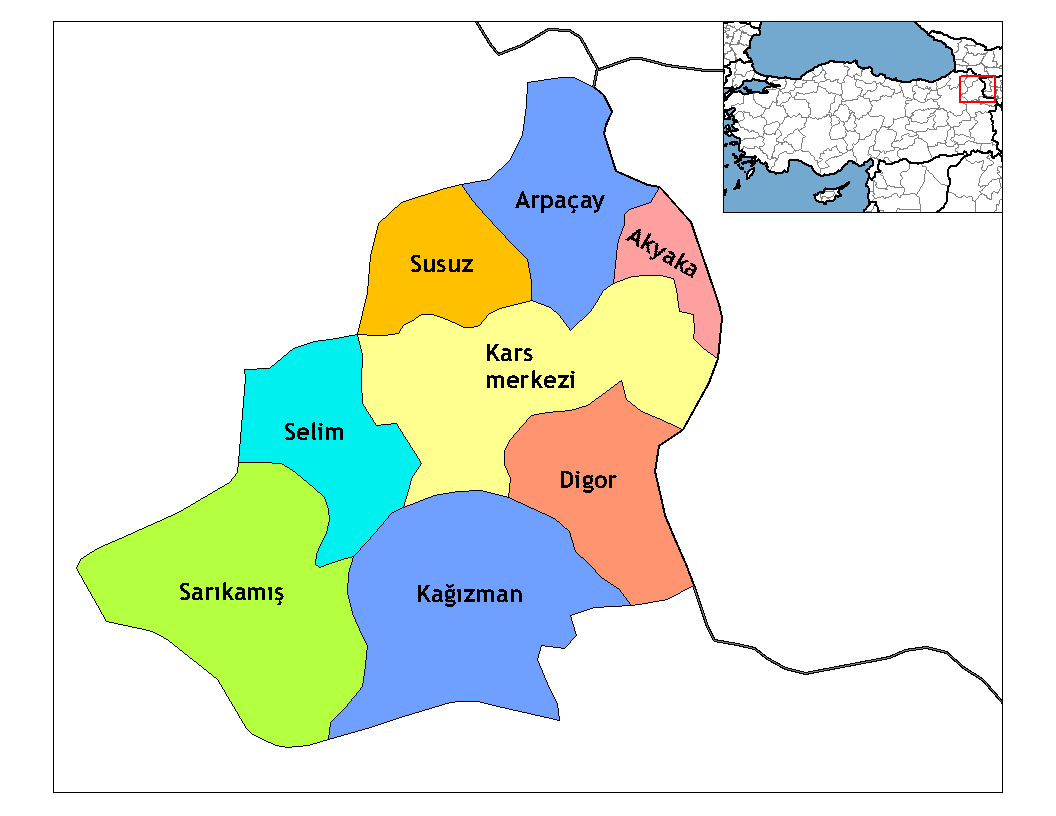
Bitlis Province

Below is the list of populated places in Bitlis Province, Turkey by the districts. In the following lists first place in each list is the administrative center of the district.

== Bitlis ==
- Bitlis
- Ağaçdere, Bitlis
- Ağaçköprü, Bitlis
- Ağaçpınar, Bitlis
- Akçalı, Bitlis
- Alaniçi, Bitlis
- Arıdağ, Bitlis
- Aşağıbalcılar, Bitlis
- Aşağıkaraboy, Bitlis
- Aşağıölek, Bitlis
- Aşağıyolak, Bitlis
- Ayrancılar, Bitlis
- Başhan, Bitlis
- Başmaklı, Bitlis
- Bayramalan, Bitlis
- Beşkaynak, Bitlis
- Bölükyazı, Bitlis
- Cevizdalı, Bitlis
- Cumhuriyet, Bitlis
- Çalıdüzü, Bitlis
- Çayırbaşı, Bitlis
- Çeltikli, Bitlis
- Çobansuyu, Bitlis
- Değirmenaltı, Bitlis
- Deliktaş, Bitlis
- Dereağzı, Bitlis
- Dikme, Bitlis
- Direktaşı, Bitlis
- Doğruyol, Bitlis
- Dörtağaç, Bitlis
- Döşkaya, Bitlis
- Ekinli, Bitlis
- Geçitbaşı, Bitlis
- Ilıcak, Bitlis
- İçgeçit, Bitlis
- İçmeli, Bitlis
- Karbastı, Bitlis
- Karınca, Bitlis
- Kavakdibi, Bitlis
- Kayabaşı, Bitlis
- Kayadağ, Bitlis
- Kayalıbağ, Bitlis
- Keklikdüzü, Bitlis
- Kınalı, Bitlis
- Kireçtaşı, Bitlis
- Kokarsu, Bitlis
- Konalga, Bitlis
- Konuksayar, Bitlis
- Koruk, Bitlis
- Kömüryakan, Bitlis
- Küllüce, Bitlis
- Narlıdere, Bitlis
- Ortakapı, Bitlis
- Sarıkonak, Bitlis
- Sarpkaya, Bitlis
- Tabanözü, Bitlis
- Tanrıyar, Bitlis
- Tatlıkaynak, Bitlis
- Uçankuş, Bitlis
- Üçevler, Bitlis
- Ünaldı, Bitlis
- Yanlızçamlar, Bitlis
- Yarönü, Bitlis
- Yayalar, Bitlis
- Yaygın, Bitlis
- Yeşilsırt, Bitlis
- Yolağzı, Bitlis
- Yolalan, Bitlis
- Yolcular, Bitlis
- Yolyazı, Bitlis
- Yukarıbalcılar, Bitlis
- Yukarıkaraboy, Bitlis
- Yukarıölek, Bitlis
- Yukarıyolak, Bitlis
- Yumurtatepe, Bitlis
- Yuvacık, Bitlis
- Yücebaş, Bitlis

== Adilcevaz ==
- Adilcevaz
- Akçıra, Adilcevaz
- Akyazı, Adilcevaz
- Aşağısüphan, Adilcevaz
- Aydınlar, Adilcevaz
- Aygırgölü, Adilcevaz
- Bahçedere, Adilcevaz
- Cihangir, Adilcevaz
- Çanakyayla, Adilcevaz
- Danacı, Adilcevaz
- Dizdar, Adilcevaz
- Erikbağı, Adilcevaz
- Esenkıyı, Adilcevaz
- Göldüzü, Adilcevaz
- Gölüstü, Adilcevaz
- Gümüşdüven, Adilcevaz
- Harmantepe, Adilcevaz
- Heybeli, Adilcevaz
- İpekçayır, Adilcevaz
- Karakol, Adilcevaz
- Karaşeyh, Adilcevaz
- Karşıyaka, Adilcevaz
- Kavuştuk, Adilcevaz
- Kömürlü, Adilcevaz
- Mollafadıl, Adilcevaz
- Örentaş, Adilcevaz
- Yarımada, Adilcevaz
- Yıldızköy, Adilcevaz
- Yolçatı, Adilcevaz
- Yukarısüphan, Adilcevaz

== Ahlat ==
- Ahlat
- Akçaören, Ahlat
- Alakır, Ahlat
- Bahçe, Ahlat
- Burcukaya, Ahlat
- Cemalettin, Ahlat
- Çatalağzı, Ahlat
- Çukurtarla, Ahlat
- Develik, Ahlat
- Dilburnu, Ahlat
- Gölgören, Ahlat
- Güzelsu, Ahlat
- Kınalıkoç, Ahlat
- Kırıkkaya, Ahlat
- Kırkdönüm, Ahlat
- Kuşhane, Ahlat
- Nazik, Ahlat
- Otluyazı, Ahlat
- Ovakışla, Ahlat
- Saka, Ahlat
- Serinbayır, Ahlat
- Seyrantepe, Ahlat
- Soğanlı, Ahlat
- Taşharman, Ahlat
- Uludere, Ahlat
- Yeniköprü, Ahlat
- Yoğurtyemez, Ahlat
- Yuvadamı, Ahlat

== Güroymak ==
- Güroymak
- Arpacık, Güroymak
- Aşağıkolbaşı, Güroymak
- Budaklı, Güroymak
- Cevizyatağı, Güroymak
- Çallı, Güroymak
- Çayarası, Güroymak
- Çıtak, Güroymak
- Değirmen, Güroymak
- Gedikpınar, Güroymak
- Gölbaşı, Güroymak
- Günkırı
- Güzelli, Güroymak
- Kaleli, Güroymak
- Kavunlu, Güroymak
- Kekliktepe, Güroymak
- Kuştaşı, Güroymak
- Oduncular, Güroymak
- Özkavak, Güroymak
- Saklı, Güroymak
- Sütderesi, Güroymak
- Tahtalı, Güroymak
- Taşüstü, Güroymak
- Üzümveren, Güroymak
- Yamaçköy, Güroymak
- Yayladere, Güroymak
- Yazıkonak, Güroymak
- Yemişveren, Güroymak
- Yukarıkolbaşı, Güroymak

== Hizan ==
- Hizan
- Ağılözü, Hizan
- Akbıyık, Hizan
- Akça, Hizan
- Akçevre, Hizan
- Akdik, Hizan
- Akşar, Hizan
- Aladana, Hizan
- Ballı, Hizan
- Ballıca, Hizan
- Bozpınar, Hizan
- Bölüklü, Hizan
- Budaklı, Hizan
- Çalışkanlar, Hizan
- Çatakdeğirmen, Hizan
- Çayır, Hizan
- Çökekyazı, Hizan
- Dayılar, Hizan
- Derince, Hizan
- Doğancı, Hizan
- Döküktaş, Hizan
- Ekinli, Hizan
- Ekintepe, Hizan
- Elmacık, Hizan
- Erencik, Hizan
- Esenler, Hizan
- Gayda, Hizan
- Gökay, Hizan
- Göktepe, Hizan
- Gönüllü, Hizan
- Gürece, Hizan
- Hacımehmet, Hizan
- Harmandöven, Hizan
- Horozdere, Hizan
- İçlikaval, Hizan
- İncirli, Hizan
- Kalkanlı, Hizan
- Kapısuyu, Hizan
- Karaağaç, Hizan
- Karbastı, Hizan
- Karlıtepe, Hizan
- Kayalı, Hizan
- Keçeli, Hizan
- Keklik, Hizan
- Koçlu, Hizan
- Koçyiğit, Hizan
- Kolludere, Hizan
- Meydan, Hizan
- Nurs, Hizan
- Oğlaklı, Hizan
- Ortaca, Hizan
- Oymapınar, Hizan
- Örgülü, Hizan
- Sağınlı, Hizan
- Sağırkaya, Hizan
- Sarıtaş, Hizan
- Sarpkaya, Hizan
- Soğuksu, Hizan
- Sürücüler, Hizan
- Süttaşı, Hizan
- Şehir, Hizan
- Tutumlu, Hizan
- Uzuntaş, Hizan
- Ürünveren, Hizan
- Yaylacık, Hizan
- Yelkıran, Hizan
- Yenicik, Hizan
- Yığınkaya, Hizan
- Yoğurtlu, Hizan
- Yolbilen, Hizan
- Yukarıayvacık, Hizan
- Yukarıçalı, Hizan

== Mutki ==
- Mutki
- Açıkalan, Mutki
- Akçaağaç, Mutki
- Akıncı, Mutki
- Akpınar, Mutki
- Alatoprak, Mutki
- Alıcık, Mutki
- Alkoyun, Mutki
- Aydemir, Mutki
- Bağarası, Mutki
- Ballı, Mutki
- Beşevler, Mutki
- Boğazönü, Mutki
- Bozburun, Mutki
- Çatalerik, Mutki
- Çatalsöğüt, Mutki
- Çaygeçit, Mutki
- Çayırlı, Mutki
- Çığır, Mutki
- Çiğdemalan, Mutki
- Çitliyol, Mutki
- Dağarcık, Mutki
- Dağlık, Mutki
- Dereyolu, Mutki
- Ekizler, Mutki
- Erler, Mutki
- Geyikpınar, Mutki
- Göztepe, Mutki
- Gümüşkanat, Mutki
- İkizler, Mutki
- Kapaklı, Mutki
- Kapıkaya, Mutki
- Karabudak, Mutki
- Kaşak, Mutki
- Kaşıklı, Mutki
- Kavakbaşı, Mutki
- Kayabaşı, Mutki
- Kayran, Mutki
- Kocainiş, Mutki
- Kovanlı, Mutki
- Koyunlu, Mutki
- Kuşdili, Mutki
- Küllüce, Mutki
- Meydan, Mutki
- Oluklu, Mutki
- Özenli, Mutki
- Salman, Mutki
- Sarıçiçek, Mutki
- Sekiliyazı, Mutki
- Taşboğaz, Mutki
- Tolgalı, Mutki
- Uran, Mutki
- Uzunyar, Mutki
- Üçadım, Mutki
- Üstyayla, Mutki
- Yalıntaş, Mutki
- Yanıkçakır, Mutki
- Yazıcık, Mutki
- Yenidoğan, Mutki
- Yeniköy, Mutki
- Yumrumeşe, Mutki
- Yuvalıdam, Mutki

== Tatvan ==
- Tatvan
- Adabağ, Tatvan
- Alacabük, Tatvan
- Anadere, Tatvan
- Benekli, Tatvan
- Bolalan, Tatvan
- Budaklı, Tatvan
- Çalıdüzü, Tatvan
- Çanakdüzü, Tatvan
- Çavuşlar, Tatvan
- Çekmece, Tatvan
- Çevre, Tatvan
- Dağdibi, Tatvan
- Dalda, Tatvan
- Dibekli, Tatvan
- Dönertaş, Tatvan
- Düzcealan, Tatvan
- Eğritaş, Tatvan
- Göllü, Tatvan
- Güntepe, Tatvan
- Güreşçi, Tatvan
- Hanelmalı, Tatvan
- Harmanlı, Tatvan
- Kağanlı, Tatvan
- Kaynarca, Tatvan
- Kırkbulak, Tatvan
- Kısıklı, Tatvan
- Kıyıdüzü, Tatvan
- Kolbaşı, Tatvan
- Koruklu, Tatvan
- Koyluca, Tatvan
- Koyunpınarı, Tatvan
- Köprücük, Tatvan
- Kuruyaka, Tatvan
- Kuşluca, Tatvan
- Küçüksu, Tatvan
- Nohutlu, Tatvan
- Obuz, Tatvan
- Odabaşı, Tatvan
- Örenlik, Tatvan
- Sallıca, Tatvan
- Sarıdal, Tatvan
- Sarıkum, Tatvan
- Söğütlü, Tatvan
- Suboyu, Tatvan
- Teknecik, Tatvan
- Tokaçlı, Tatvan
- Topraklı, Tatvan
- Tosunlu, Tatvan
- Ulusoy, Tatvan
- Uncular, Tatvan
- Uslu, Tatvan
- Yassıca, Tatvan
- Yediveren, Tatvan
- Yelkenli, Tatvan
- Yoncabaşı, Tatvan
- Yumrukaya, Tatvan
- Yumurtatepe, Tatvan
