= List of municipalities in Bitlis Province =

This is the List of municipalities in Bitlis Province, Turkey as of January 2023.

District	Municipality
Adilcevaz	Adilcevaz
Adilcevaz	Aydınlar
Ahlat	Ahlat
Ahlat	Ovakışla
Bitlis	Bitlis
Bitlis	Yolalan
Güroymak	Gölbaşı
Güroymak	Günkırı
Güroymak	Güroymak
Hizan	Hizan
Mutki	Kavakbaşı
Mutki	Mutki
Tatvan	Tatvan
