= Karşıyaka (disambiguation) =

Karşıyaka is the name of several localities in Turkey. These are;

== Places ==
- Karşıyaka, a large metropolitan district of İzmir, Turkey
- Karşıyaka, Adana, a quarter in Adana, Turkey
- Karşıyaka, Adilcevaz, a village
- Karşıyaka, Bartın, a village in Bartın, Turkey
- Karşıyaka, Çubuk, a village in Çubuk District of Ankara Province, Turkey
- Karşıyaka, Kozluk, a village in Kozluk District of Batman Province, Turkey
- Karşıyaka, Merzifon, a village in Merzifon District of Amasya Province, Turkey

== Other uses ==
- Karşıyaka Arena, an indoor arena in İzmir, Turkey homr to Pınar Karşıyaka and Karşıyaka Women's Volleyball Team.
- Karşıyaka Cemetery, the largest cemetery in Ankara, Turkey
- Karşıyaka (İZBAN), historic railway station on the İZBAN commuter rail system, in the Karşıyaka district of İzmir, Turkey
- Karşıyaka S.K., Turkish sports club from Izmir, Turkey
- Karşıyaka Tram, a tram line in Karşıyaka, İzmir, Turkey
- Karşıyaka Women's Volleyball Team, women's volleyball team of Karşıyaka S.k. in İzmir, Turkey
- Pınar Karşıyaka, basketball team of Karşıyaka S.k. in İzmir, Turkey
