= Kömürlü =

Kömürlü can refer to the following villages in Turkey:

- Kömürlü, Adilcevaz
- Kömürlü, Bozyazı
- Kömürlü, Yusufeli
