= Bahçedere =

Bahçedere can refer to the following villages in Turkey:

- Bahçedere, Adilcevaz
- Bahçedere, Ayvacık
- Bahçedere, Dicle
- Bahçedere, Gerede
- Bahçedere, Maden
