= Kars–Nakhchivan railway =

The Kars–Nakhchivan railway is a planned international rail connection from Turkey to Azerbaijan.

== Geographic location ==
Nakhchivan is the capital city of the Nakhchivan Autonomous Republic, an exclave belonging to Azerbaijan, which is separated from the main part of the country by Armenia. The only railway line which connected both parts of the country was the Ələt-Julfa railway which ran along the north bank of the river Aras, but through Armenian territory; it has been out of service since 1989.

Kars has been the easternmost operational point on the Turkish railway network since 1990, after the track section to Gyumri fell into disuse following the closure of the Armenia–Turkey border. Kars is also the start of the Baku–Tbilisi–Kars railway which connects Turkey with Azerbaijan via Georgia.

The upper course of the Aras forms a long part of the border between Armenia and Turkey, with Armenia to the northeast and Turkey to the southwest. Further downstream, Turkey has a short border only a few kilometres in length with Nakhchivan, before further along, the river forms the border between Nakhchivan and Iran. It is the only place where Azerbaijan and Turkey have a land-border.

== Context ==
Azerbaijan and Turkey feel connected due to their similar culture and language. Between these two countries and Armenia there is a historical feeling of enmity due to the Armenian Genocide and a series of wars – Armenia most recently lost the Second Nagorno-Karabakh War (2020), and, in September 2023, Azerbaijan invaded and annexed the entire region. This tension is the primary reason Azerbaijan and Turkey have a strong interest in a transport link that avoids Armenia.

== Preparation ==
On a state visit to Nakhchivan on 25th September 2023, Turkish president Recep Tayyip Erdoğan and his host, Ilham Aliyev, signed a letter of intent regarding the construction of the Kars–Nakhchivan railway, which is supposed to use the short shared border south of Aralık (Note: Azerbaijani: Aralıq; Armenian: Արալիխ) in order to cross the border between the two states, parallel to European route E99. The line's length will be 224 kilometres (139 mi), double-tracked, and electrified. To which gauge the line will be built (i.e. whether to Russian gauge (used by the Azerbaijani rail network) or standard gauge (used by the Turkish rail network)) and where the break of gauge (required regardless of the new railway's gauge) will be built, was not published. Construction began in August 2025 and should finish by 2030.

== See also ==
- Transport in Azerbaijan
- Transport in Turkey
