= Yıldızköy =

Yıldızköy can refer to the following villages in Turkey:

- Yıldızköy, Adilcevaz
- Yıldızköy, Amasya
- Yıldızköy, Mut
