= Yamaçköy, Güroymak =

Village in Güroymak District, Bitlis Province, Turkey

Yamaçköy
- Village
- Location within Turkey
- Coordinates: 38.583°N 42.017°E
- Country: Turkey
- Province: Bitlis
- District: Güroymak
- Population (2021): 943
- Time zone: UTC+3 (TRT)

Yamaçköy is a village in the Güroymak District of Bitlis Province in Turkey. Its population is 943 as of 2021.

== History ==
The village was formerly known as Pav in 1556 and Pov in 1902, both of which are of Armenian origin.

== Geography ==
The village is located at an altitude of 1,600 meters above sea level. It is surrounded by the villages of Üzümveren, Yazıkonak, Kuştaşı, and Özkavak.
