= Akbıyık =

Akbıyık can refer to:

- Akbıyık, Hizan
- Akbıyık, Yenişehir
