= Saklı =

Saklı can refer to:

- Saklı, Güroymak
- Saklı, Hasankeyf
