= Arpacık =

Arpacık can refer to:

- Arpacık, Güroymak
- Arpacık, Ulus
- Arpacık, Yusufeli
