= Örentaş =

Örentaş can refer to:

- Örentaş, Adilcevaz
- Örentaş, Köprüköy
