= Yamaçköy =

Yamaçköy may refer to several places in Turkey:

- Yamaçköy, Bismil
- Yamaçköy, Güroymak
- Yamaçköy, a village in Çayeli District
