= European route E99 =

Road in trans-European E-road network

E99

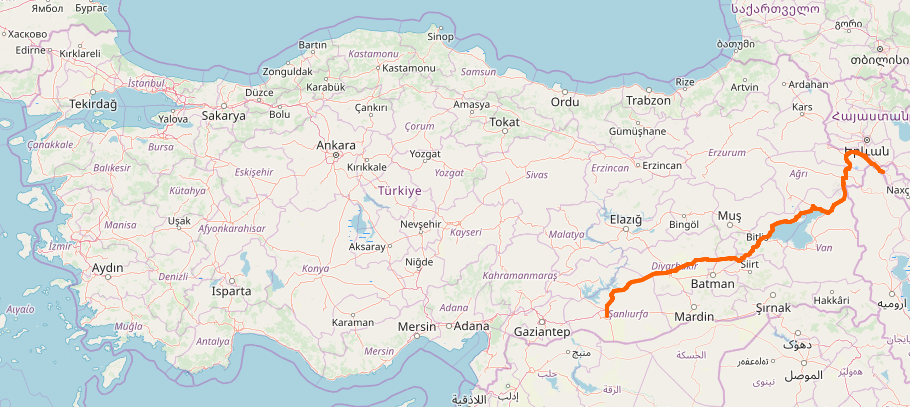

Route information
- Length: 856 km (532 mi)

Major junctions
- North end: Dəmirçi, Azerbaijan
- South end: Tell Abyad, Syria

Location
- Countries: Azerbaijan; Turkey; Syria

Highway system
- International E-road network; A Class; B Class

The European route E99 or E99 is a European road running from Dəmirçi, Azerbaijan to Akçakale in Turkey on Syrian border.

== Route ==
Azerbaijan

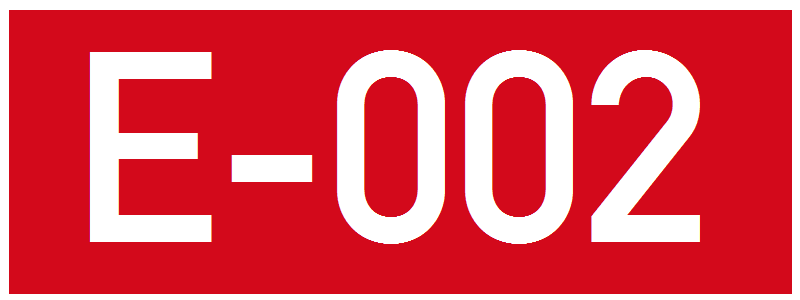
- M 7: Dəmirçi ( E002)

Turkey

- D.080: Aralık - Iğdır
- D.975: Iğdır - Doğubeyazıt ( E80) - Muradiye
- D.280: Muradiye - Erciş
- D.290: Erciş - Heybeli
- D.965: Heybeli - Tatvan - Bitlis - Ziyaret
- D.360: Ziyaret - Diyarbakır - Siverek
- D.885: Siverek - Şanlıurfa ( E90) - Akçakale

Syria

- 712 Route 712: Tell Abyad
