= Zaro Aga =

Longevity claimant

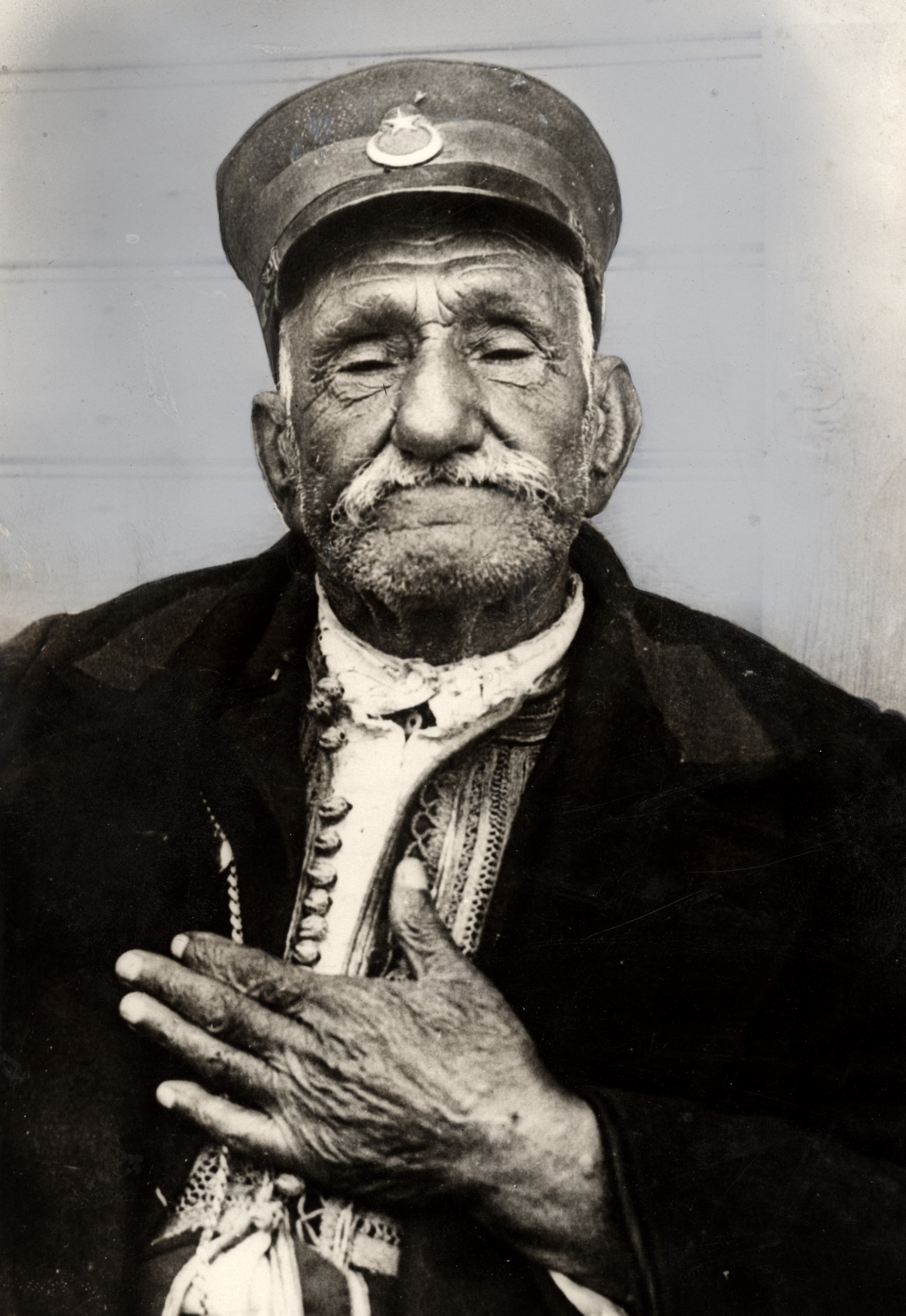
- Born: 16 February 1774 (claimed); Mutki, Ottoman Empire
- Died: 29 June 1934 (allegedly aged 160 years, 133 days); Istanbul, Turkey
- Citizenship: Ottoman Empire
- Occupations: Porter, labourer, doorman
- Known for: Longevity
- Children: 36

Zaro Aga (Turkish: Zaro Ağa; Kurdish: زارۆ ئاغا, romanized: Zaro Axa) was a Turkish man of Kurdish origin who claimed to be one of the longest-living persons ever. He claimed birth on 16 February 1774 in Mutki, and died on 29 June 1934 in Istanbul, Turkey. He was allegedly aged 160 when he died, and thus claimed to be one of the longest-living persons ever.

== Debate ==
There is ongoing debate as to his actual age when he died. According to the death certificate provided by his Turkish doctor, Zaro Aga's age was 157. He died in Istanbul, although some confusion about the place of death exists, likely due to the fact that the body was sent to the US right after his death. However, an investigative report published by Walter Bowerman in 1939 indicated that Zaro Aga was around 97, not 157.

== Biography ==
Aga was born in Medan village (present-day Meydan) in Mutki (then in the Ottoman Empire), worked as a construction worker when he was young, and then moved to Istanbul, where he worked as a porter and finally retired as a janitor. He was a major attraction to popular press during his last years as allegedly the world's oldest living man and one who had travelled to many countries, including the United States, the United Kingdom, France and Italy. His body was sent to the US for research purposes after he died.

Zaro Aga had come into Mustafa Kemal Atatürk's presence twice and called him "Sultan". Turkish newspaper Taraf wrote that when Zaro met with Mustafa Kemal, he mentioned his having done very good jobs, but he allegedly criticised his giving much freedom to the women.

During his lifetime surgeons treating Aga for an internal complaint examined X-Rays of his bones and cast doubt on his claimed age, suggesting he was not more than 120 years old. The old man was, according to Reuter from Istanbul, very angry and flourished his birth certificate under the noses of the doubting doctors.

He claimed to have met Napoleon, to have fought in six wars, and to have fought in the Battle of Plevna, when he was 100. He was not sure if he had been married eleven or twelve times, but claimed to have roughly 36 children.

In 1931, he toured England and enjoyed a flight from Brooklands. He did not drink, or smoke, and was largely vegetarian. He held conservative views, feeling that women should have long hair and skirts, and in Turkey they should remain indoors, out of the view of strangers.

Aga had 14 children, however their names were never recorded. His wife, a Turk, was highly looked upon. She was viewed as a person above most people, but died at 60 years old.

Aga himself refused to believe the claims of Li Ching-Yuen in China who was said to be 252 years old. Aga lived in relative anonymity until 1930, when someone, hearing his stories about meeting Napoleon and the Sultan of Turkey, pointed out that he had a claim to be the world's oldest man, and he began a public life with a tour of the US. He said that he lost his teeth soon after Napoleon III lost Sedan. He became prosperous through his fame and toured circus shows as the 'Eighth Wonder of the World'.

Eventually Aga had to return home, as his wife Kudret was threatening to sue him for maintenance. He resumed his £8 a month job as a coffee brewer for the local city council. For the remainder of his life he told stories to the coffee house patrons not of meeting Napoleon, but of his travels to New York and London.

== In popular culture ==
Aga found a mention in Satyajit Ray's Bangla short story, Spotlight. The central character of the story was a centenarian. His arrival in the United States on July 18, 1930 is referenced in the 1930 Gershwin-Guy Bolton-Jack McGowan musical comedy Girl Crazy.

== Gallery ==
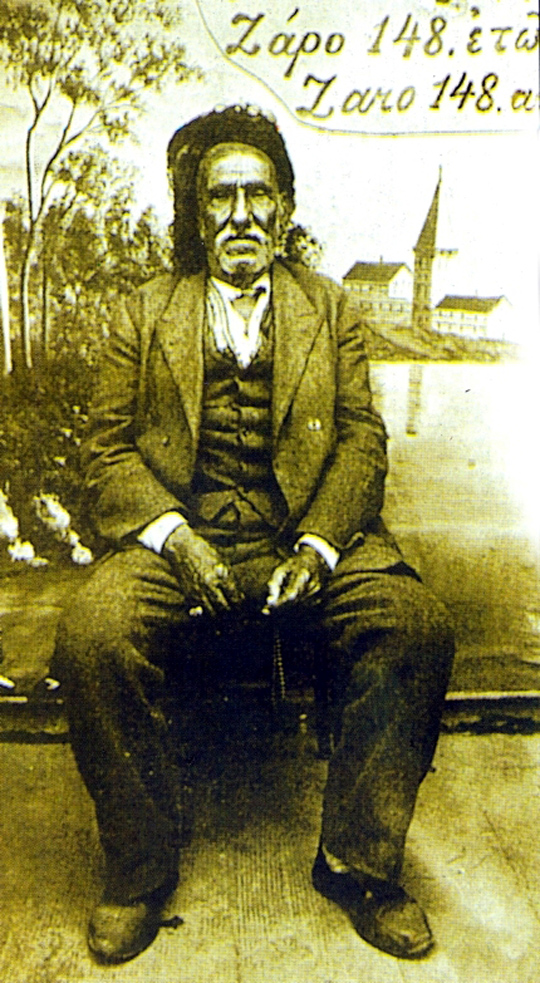
Zaro Aga in Istanbul

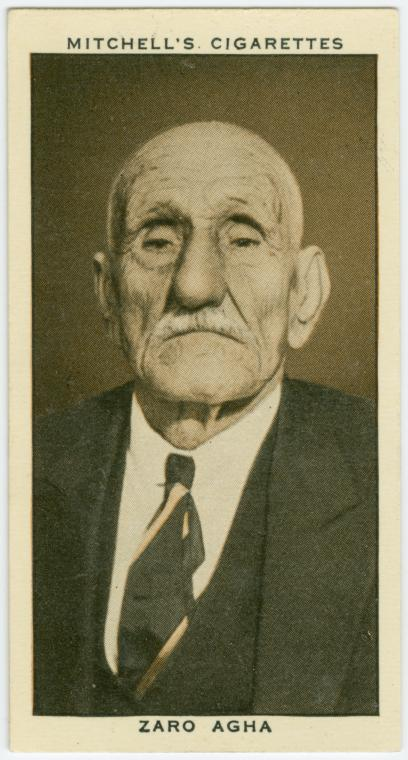
Mitchell's cigarette pack

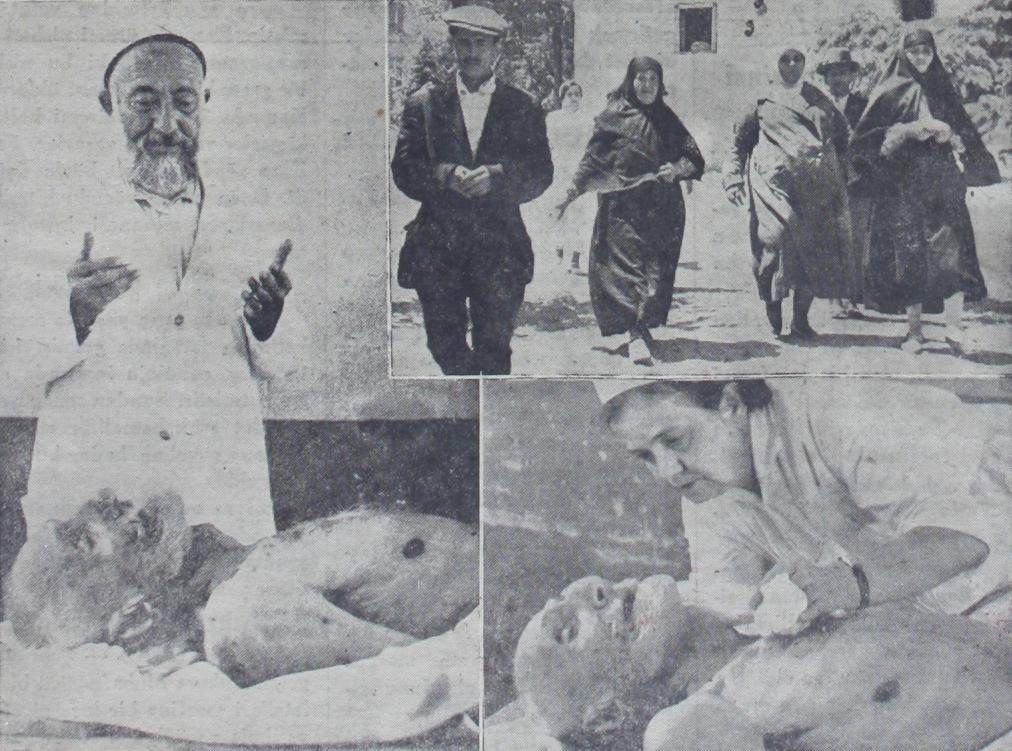
Death of Zaro Aga

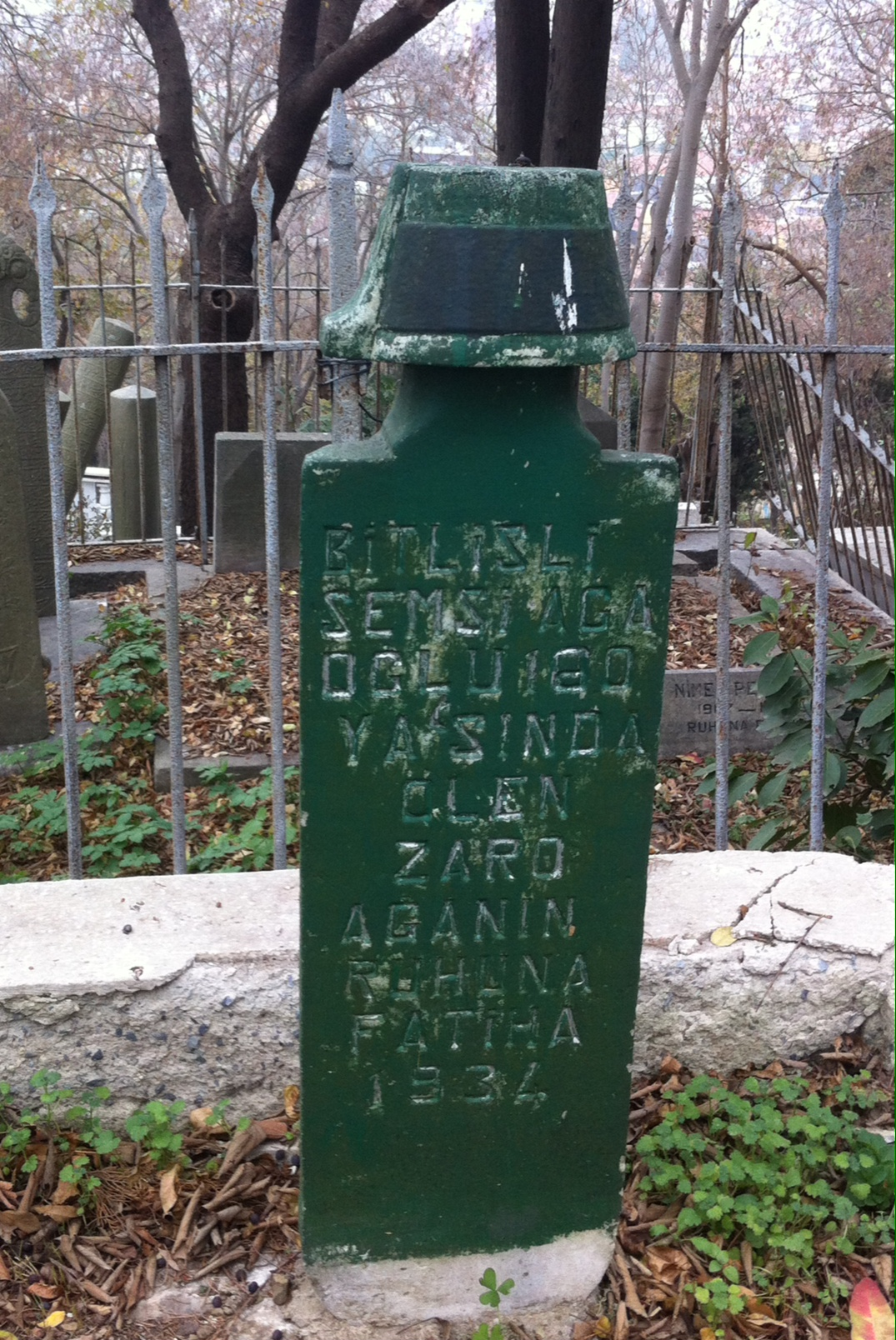
Tombstone of Zaro Aga at Eyüp Sultan Cemetery
