= Li Ching-Yuen =

Chinese herbalist (died 1933)

- 李清雲
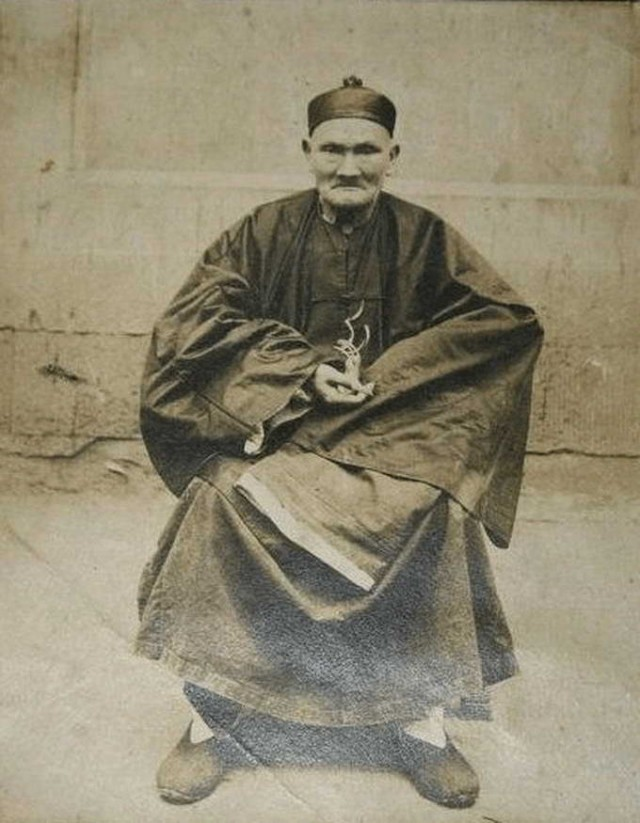
- Ching-Yuen at the residence of National Revolutionary Army General Yang Sen in Wanxian Sichuan in 1927
- Born: Unknown
- Died: 6 May 1933; Kai County, Sichuan, Republic of China
- Other names: Li, Ching
- Occupation: Herbalist
- Known for: Extreme longevity claim and spiritual practices by means of herbs.
- Notable work: My Life Story
- Height: 2.13m (7 ft 0 in)

Li Ching-Yuen or Li Ching-Yun (simplified Chinese: 李清云; traditional Chinese: 李清雲; pinyin: Lǐ Qīngyún, died 6 May 1933) was a Chinese herbalist, martial artist and tactical advisor, known for his supposed extreme longevity.

Li's year of birth was alleged to be 1677, though his true age has never been determined. Gerontologists consider his claims to be a myth.

== Biography ==
Ching-Yuen worked as a herbalist, selling lingzhi, goji berry, wild ginseng, he shou wu and gotu kola along with other Chinese herbs, and lived off a diet of these herbs and rice wine.

It was generally accepted in Sichuan that Ching-Yuen was fully literate as a child, and that by his tenth birthday had travelled to Gansu, Shanxi, Tibet, Vietnam, Thailand and Manchuria with the purpose of gathering herbs, continuing with this occupation for a century, before beginning to purvey herbs gathered by others.

The Zhili warlord Wu Peifu (吳佩孚) took him into his home in an attempt to discover the secret of living 250 years.

He died from natural causes on 6 May 1933 in Kai Xian, Sichuan, Republic of China. Ching-Yuen supposedly sired over 200 descendants during his lifespan, surviving 24 wives. Other sources credit him with 180 descendants, over 11 generations, living at the time of his death and 14 marriages.

After his death, Yang Sen wrote a report about him, A Factual Account of the 250 Year-Old Good-Luck Man (一个250岁长寿老人的真实记载), in which he described Ching-Yuen's appearance: "He has good eyesight and a brisk stride; Li stands seven feet tall, has very long fingernails, and a ruddy complexion."

== Timeline of lifespan according to General Yang Sen ==
It is alleged that Ching-Yuen was born at Qijiang County, Sichuan province, in 1677. By age 13, he had embarked upon a life of gathering herbs in the mountains with three elders. At age 51, he served as a tactical and topography advisor in the army of General Yue Zhongqi.

At age 78, he retired from his military career after fighting in a battle at Golden River and returned to a life of gathering herbs on Snow Mountain in Sichuan province. Due to his military service in the army of General Yue Zhongqi, the imperial government sent a document congratulating Li on his 100th year of life, as was subsequently done on his 150th and 200th birthdays.

In 1908, Ching-Yuen and his disciple Yang Hexuan published a book, The Secrets of Li Qingyun's Immortality.

In 1920, General Xiong Yanghe interviewed Ching-Yuen (both men were from the village of Chenjiachang of Wan County in Sichuan province), publishing an article about it in the Nanjing University paper that same year.

In 1926, Wu Peifu invited Ching-Yuen to Beijing. This visit coincides with Li teaching at the Beijing University Meditation Society at the invitation of the famous meditation master and author Yin Shi Zi.

Then, in 1927, General Yang Sen invited Ching-Yuen to Wanxian, where the first known photographs of him were taken. Word spread throughout China of Ching-Yuen, and Yang Sen's commander, General Chiang Kai-shek, requested him to visit Nanjing. However, when Yang Sen's envoys arrived at Ching-Yuen's hometown of Chenjiachang, they were told by his wife and disciples that he had died in nature, offering no more information. So, his actual date of death and location have never been verified.

In 1928, Dean Wu Chung-Chien of the Department of Education at Min Kuo University discovered the imperial documents showing these birthday wishes to Ching-Yuen. His discovery was first reported in the two leading Chinese newspapers of that period, North China Daily News and Shanghai Declaration News, and then maybe one year later, potentially in 1929, by The New York Times and Time magazine. Both of these Western publications reported the death of Ching-Yuen in May 1933.

== Longevity ==
Whereas Li Ching-Yuen himself claimed to have been born in 1736, Wu Chung-Chieh, a professor of the Chengdu University, asserted that Li was born in 1677: according to a 1930 New York Times article, Wu discovered Imperial Chinese government records from 1827 congratulating Li on his 150th birthday, and further documents later congratulating him on his 200th birthday in 1877. In 1928, a New York Times correspondent wrote that many of the old men in Li's neighborhood asserted that their grandfathers knew him when they were boys, and that he at that time was a grown man.

A correspondent of The New York Times reported that "many who have seen him recently declare that his facial appearance is no different from that of persons two centuries his junior." Gerontological researchers have called his age claim "fantastical" and also noted that his age at death, 256 years, was chosen as a multiple of 8, which is considered good luck in China. Additionally, the connection of Li's age to his spiritual practices has been pointed to; researchers perceived that "these types of things [the myth that certain philosophies or religious practices allow a person to live to extreme old age] are most common in the Far East".

One of Li's disciples, the Taijiquan Master Da Liu, told of his master's story: when 130 years old Master Li encountered in 1807 a hermit over 500 years old, who taught him Baguazhang and a set of Qigong with breathing instructions, movements training coordinated with specific sounds, and dietary recommendations. Da Liu reports that his master said that his longevity "is due to the fact that he performed the exercises every day – regularly, correctly, and with sincerity – for 120 years."

The article "Tortoise-Pigeon-Dog", from the 15 May 1933 issue of Time reports on his history, and includes Li's answer to the secret of a long life:

Keep a quiet heart, sit like a tortoise, walk sprightly like a pigeon and sleep like a dog.

— Li Ching-Yuen

An article in the Evening Independent claims that Li's longevity is due to his experimentation with medicinal herbs in his capacity as a druggist, his discovery in the Yunnan mountains of herbs which "prevent the ravages of old age" and which he continued to use throughout his life. Modern historians speculate his actual age at death to be likely 90-100 years old. According to some reports he was born in 1840 which would make him 93 at the time of his death.

== See also ==
- Longevity claims
- Longevity myths
- Oldest people
- Shirali Muslimov – an Azerbaijani man who was allegedly 168 years old at the time of his death
- Jiroemon Kimura – a Japanese supercentenarian and the oldest verified man
- Zaro Aga – a Kurdish man who was allegedly 160 years old at the time of his death
