= Kâmran İnan =

Turkish politician (1929–2015)

Kamran İnan

Minister of Energy and Natural Resources of Turkey
- In office 21 July 1977 – 5 January 1978
- Preceded by: Neşet Akmandor
- Succeeded by: Deniz Baykal

Personal details
- Born: 18 February 1929 Hizan, Bitlis, Turkey
- Died: 23 November 2015 (aged 86)

Kamran Inan (18 February 1929 – 23 November 2015) was a Turkish Kurdish politician, statesman, diplomat and scholar from Turkey. He was born in Hizan, Bitlis Province. Representative in Turkish Parliament (TBMM) from Van and Bitlis numerous times. Graduate of Ankara University Faculty of Law, and Ph.D. in Law from University of Geneva. At various times Turkish UN Ambassador, permanent UN representative, Turkish Minister of Energy and Natural Resources and Minister of State, Senator from Bitlis and member of Foreign Affairs Commission. He published numerous books on Turkish politics and history.

In 2006, he returned the Légion d'honneur medal he had received from France due to the French government involvement with Armenian ethnic activities. He has also received European Parliament Gold Medal and Turkey–EEC Partnership Silver Medal.
