= Ramazanoğlu Cultural Center =

Coordinates: 36°58′41″N 35°20′16″E

Yüreğir Ramazanoğlu Cultural Center
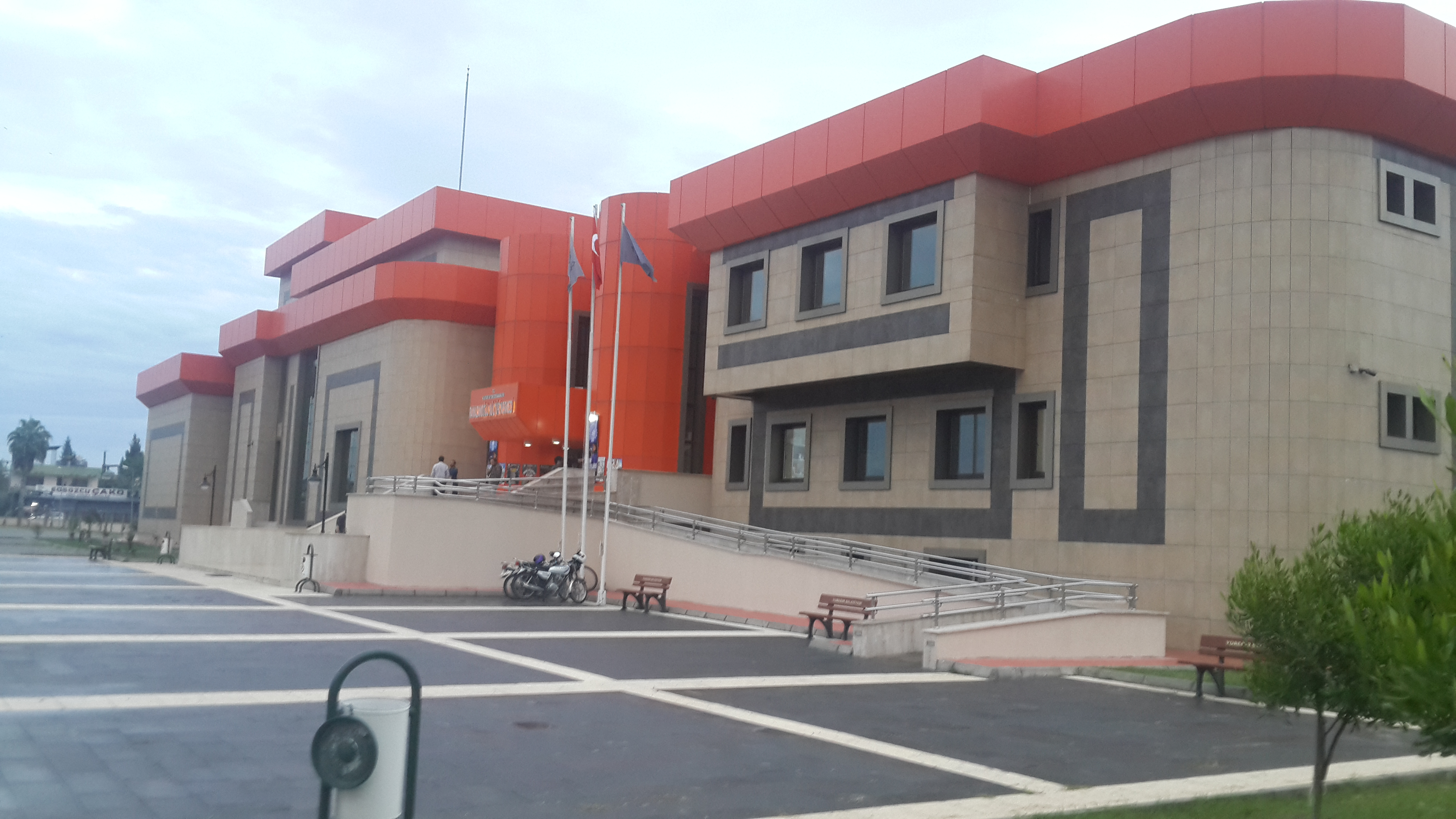
- North-west view of the center
- Interactive map of Yüreğir Ramazanoğlu Cultural Center
- Address: Karşıyaka, Yüreğir; Adana; Turkey
- Owner: Ministry of Culture and Tourism
- Capacity: 368 (theater hall)
- Type: Cultural complex
- Current use: theatre, library, exhibition hall

Construction
- Opened: 25 September 2013

Ramazanoğlu Cultural Center is a complex in the Karşıyaka quarter of the city of Adana. The centre is composed of a theatre hall, public library and an exhibition hall. It is located in the Seyhan neighborhood of the Yüreğir district, close to the east end of the Regulatör Bridge.

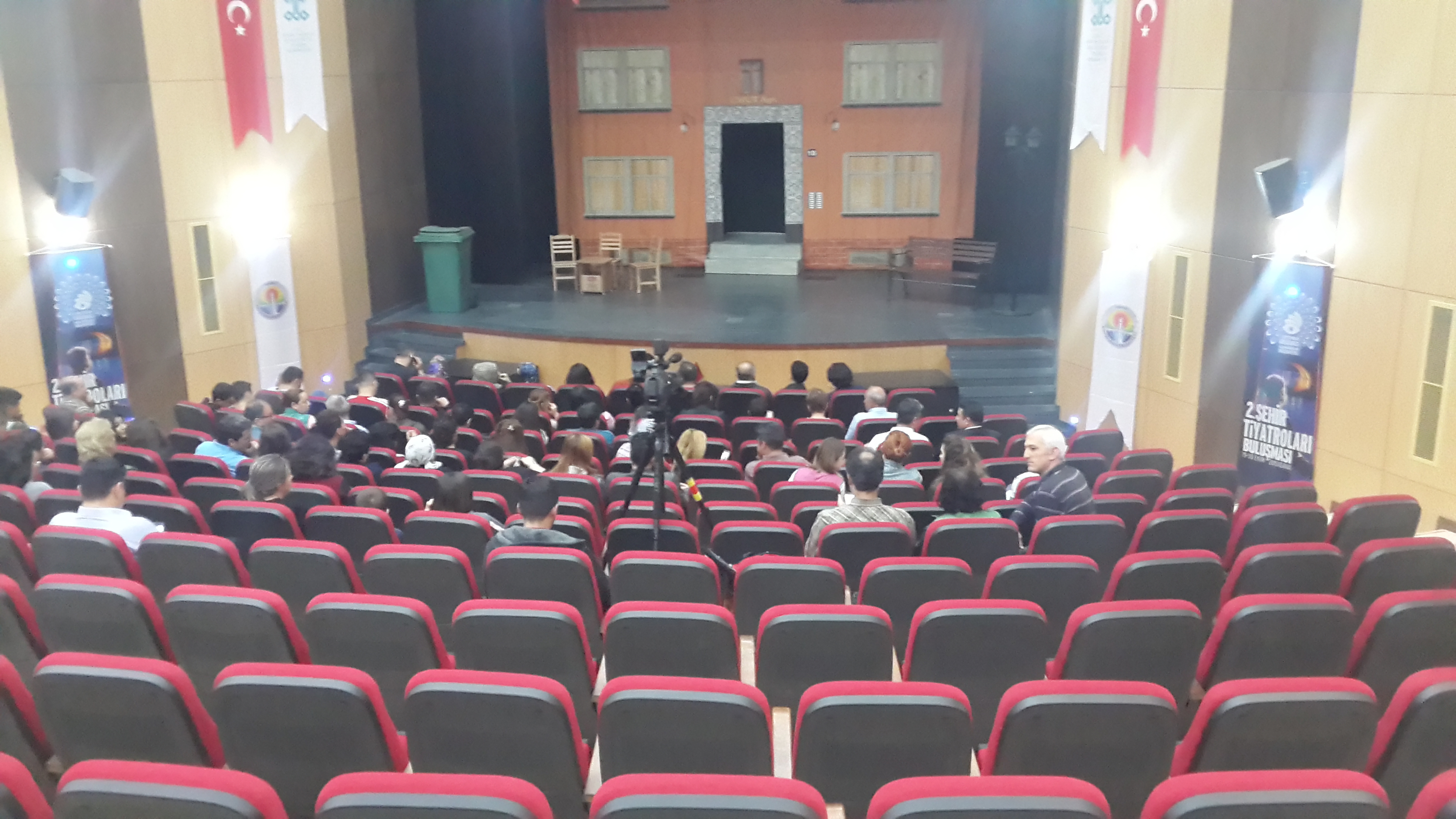
Theatre hall

== The Center ==
The center has been established on an area of 0.89 ha (2.2 acres). The theatre building has an area of 1,400 m^{2} (15,000 square feet). Total cost to build the center was 11.3 million TL.
