= Karakolköy, Adilcevaz =

Village in Turkey

Karakolköy
- Village
- Country: Turkey
- Province: Bitlis
- District: Adilcevaz
- Population (2021): 88
- Time zone: UTC+3 (TRT)

Karakolköy (also: Karakol) is a village in the Adilcevaz District of Bitlis Province in Turkey. Its population is 88 (2021).
