= Suat Kaya (footballer, born 1999) =

Turkish footballer

Personal information
- Full name: Suat Kaya
- Date of birth: 15 April 1999 (age 27)
- Place of birth: Hizan, Turkey
- Height: 1.80 m (5 ft 11 in)
- Position: Left winger

Team information
- Current team: 52 Orduspor
- Number: 11

Youth career
- 2010–2012: Kuvayi Milliyespor
- 2012–2018: Osmanlıspor

Senior career*
Years	Team	Apps	(Gls)
2018	Osmanlıspor	1	(0)
2018–2019	BAKspor	48	(8)
2020–2022	Ankaragücü	0	(0)
2020	→ 1928 Bucaspor (loan)	8	(2)
2020–2021	→ Tarsus İdman Yurdu (loan)	31	(11)
2021–2022	→ Iğdır (loan)	33	(5)
2022–2025	Çorum	77	(17)
2025–2026	Kahramanmaraş İstiklalspor	16	(3)
2026	Aliağa FK	10	(1)
2026–	52 Orduspor	4	(0)
- * Club domestic league appearances and goals as of 1 October 2026

Suat Kaya (born 15 April 1999) is a Turkish professional footballer who plays as a midfielder for TFF 2. Lig club 52 Orduspor.

== Career ==
A youth product of Osmanlıspor, Kaya made his professional debut in a 2-1 Süper Lig loss to Akhisarspor on 18 May 2018.

On 16 July 2022, Kaya joined TFF Second League club Çorum.
