= Güroymak District =

District of Bitlis Province, Turkey

- District
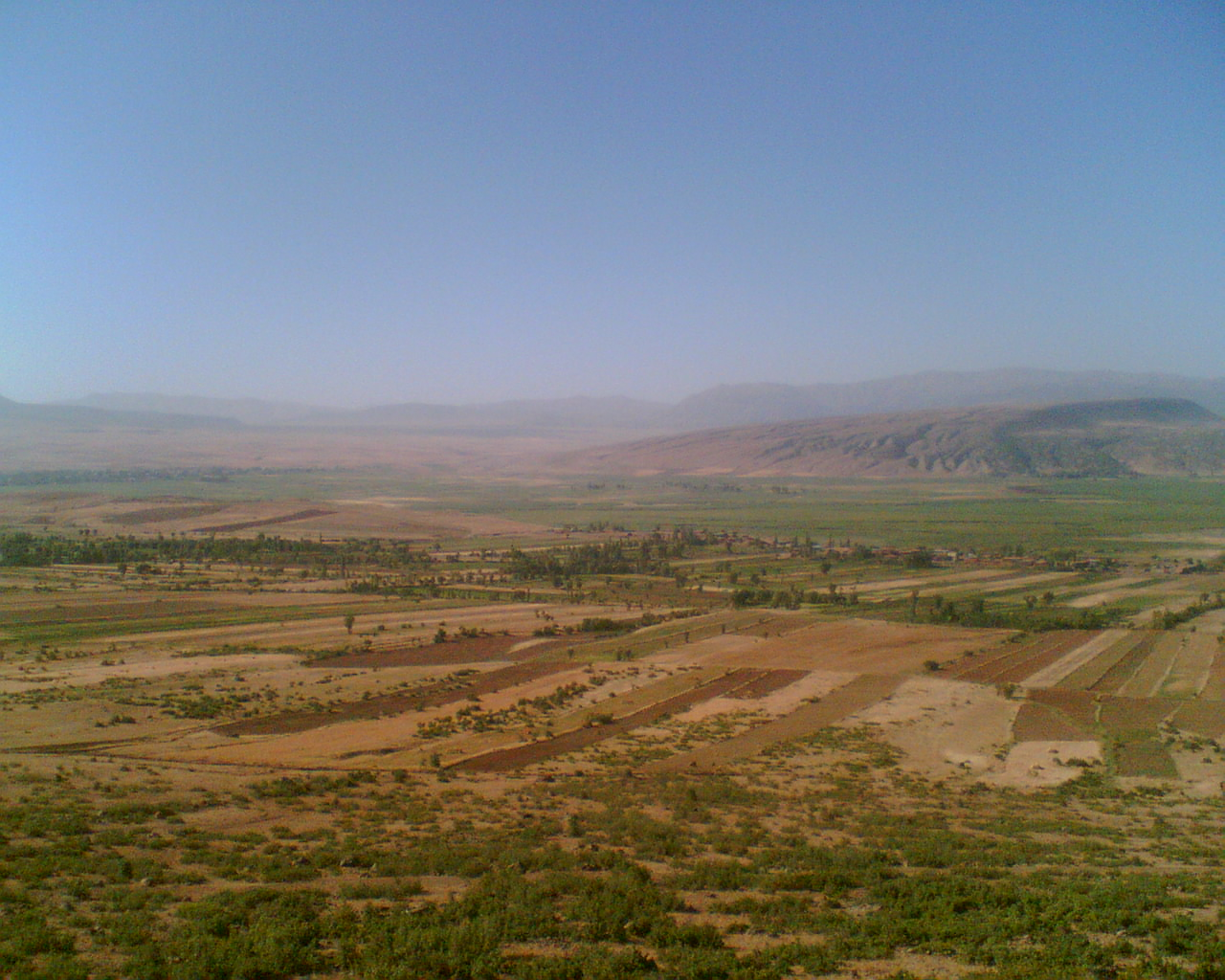
- Sıcak Su locale, Güroymak

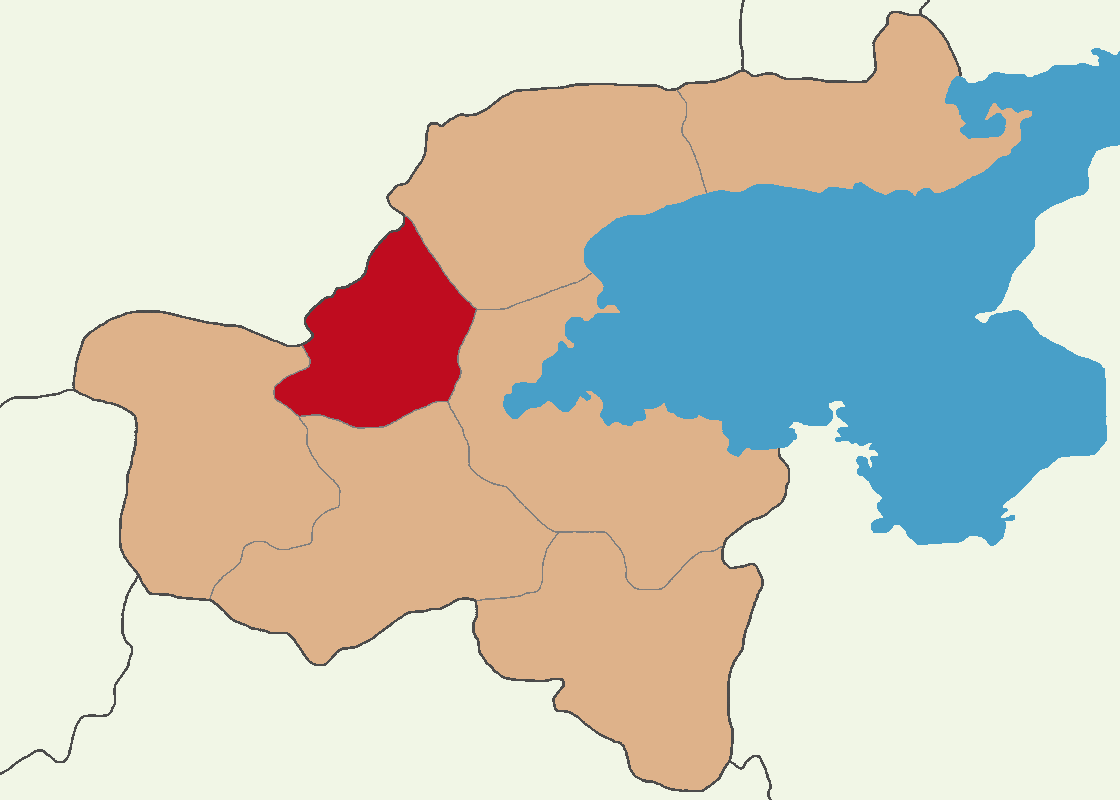
- Map showing Güroymak District in Bitlis Province

- Location within Turkey
- Coordinates: 38°35′N 42°1′E
- Country: Turkey
- Province: Bitlis
- Seat: Güroymak

Government
  - Kaymakam: Mehmet Zahid UZUN
- Area: 515 km^{2} (199 sq mi)
- Population (2021): 48,536
  - Density: 94.2/km^{2} (244/sq mi)
- Time zone: UTC+3 (TRT)
- Website: www.guroymak.gov.tr

Güroymak District (Kurdish: Norşin) is a district of Bitlis Province of Turkey. Its seat is the town of Güroymak. Its area is 515 km^{2}, and its population is 48,536 (2021).

== Tourism ==
The main places with tourism potential in Güroymak are Güroymak Hot Springs.

== Composition ==
There are three municipalities in Güroymak District:

- Gölbaşı
- Günkırı
- Güroymak

There are 26 villages in Güroymak District:

- Arpacık
- Aşağıkolbaşı
- Budaklı
- Cevizyatağı
- Çallı
- Çayarası
- Çıtak
- Değirmenköy
- Gedikpınar
- Güzelli
- Kaleli
- Kavunlu
- Kekliktepe
- Kuştaşı
- Oduncular
- Özkavak
- Saklı
- Sütderesi
- Tahtalı
- Taşüstü
- Üzümveren
- Yamaçköy
- Yayladere
- Yazıkonak
- Yemişveren
- Yukarıkolbaşı
