= Mutki District =

District of Bitlis Province, Turkey

- District
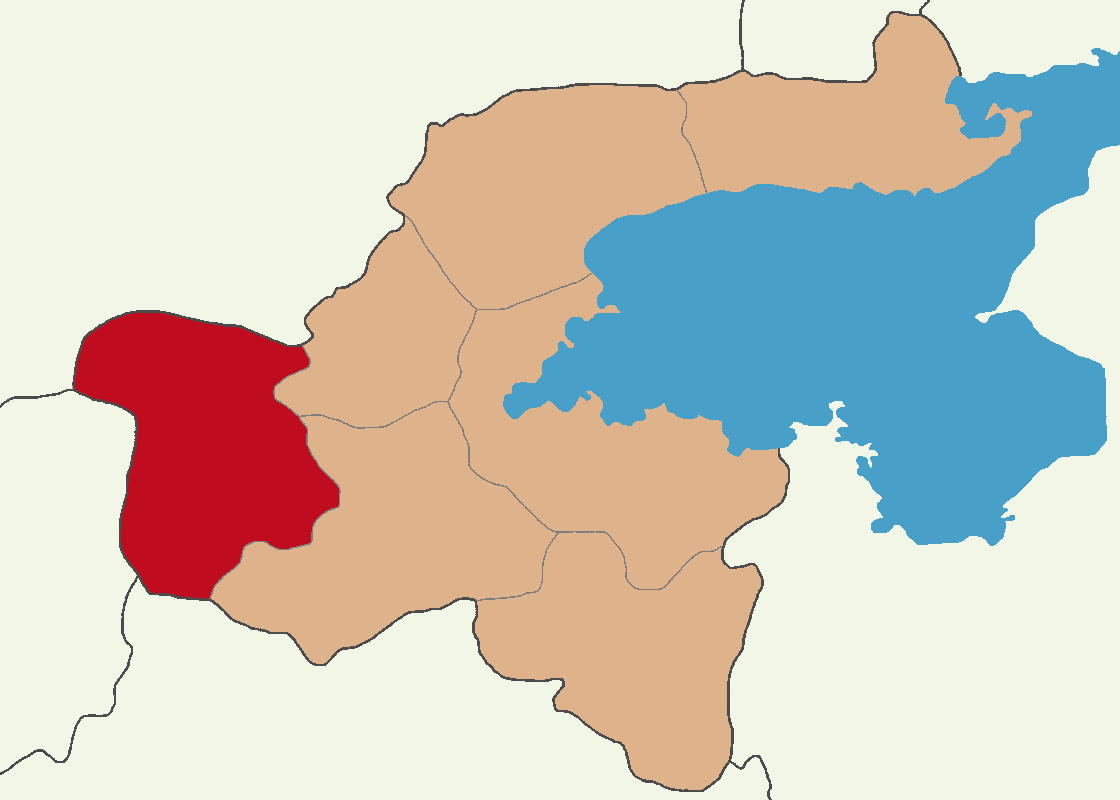
- Map showing Mutki District in Bitlis Province

- Location in Turkey
- Coordinates: 38°25′N 41°55′E
- Country: Turkey
- Province: Bitlis
- Seat: Mutki

Government
  - Kaymakam: Hasan Hüseyin Uzan
- Area: 1,069 km^{2} (413 sq mi)
- Population (2021): 30,940
  - Density: 29/km^{2} (75/sq mi)
- Time zone: UTC+3 (TRT)
- Website: www.mutki.gov.tr

Mutki District is a district of Bitlis Province of Turkey. Its seat is the town of Mutki. Its area is 1,069 km^{2}, and its population is 30,940 (2021).

== Composition ==
There are two municipalities in Mutki District:

- Kavakbaşı
- Mutki

There are 60 villages in Mutki District:

- Açıkalan
- Akçaağaç
- Akıncı
- Akpınar
- Alatoprak
- Alıcık
- Alkoyun
- Aydemir
- Bağarası
- Ballı
- Beşevler
- Boğazönü
- Bozburun
- Çatalerik
- Çatalsöğüt
- Çaygeçit
- Çayırlı
- Çiğdemalan
- Çığır
- Çitliyol
- Dağarcık
- Dağlık
- Dereyolu
- Ekizler
- Erler
- Geyikpınar
- Göztepe
- Gümüşkanat
- İkizler
- Kapaklı
- Kapıkaya
- Karabudak
- Kaşak
- Kaşıklı
- Kayabaşı
- Kayran
- Kocainiş
- Kovanlı
- Koyunlu
- Kuşdili
- Küllüce
- Meydan
- Oluklu
- Özenli
- Salman
- Sarıçiçek
- Sekiliyazı
- Taşboğaz
- Tolgalı
- Üçadım
- Uran
- Üstyayla
- Uzunyar
- Yalıntaş
- Yanıkçakır
- Yazıcık
- Yenidoğan
- Yeniköy
- Yumrumeşe
- Yuvalıdam
