= Xelîlê Sêrtî =

Xelîlê Sêrtî (1754–1843) was a Kurdish mullah and author most known for his contributions to the Kurdish madrasas. He wrote in Arabic and Kurdish and his main works are Nehcu'l-Enam and Rîsaleya Tecwîdê.

== Biography ==
Xelîlê Sêrtî was born in the village of Gulpik of Hizan near Bitlis in 1754 and moved to Siirt early in his life. He was given the name Sêrtî as he lived in Siirt when he became a known figure.

He studied in Gevaş, Cizre, Xoab and Amadiya and received his scientific license in Amadiya. He afterwards settled in the village of Reşîdiyê near Mosul where he became affiliated with the Qadiriyya order. He later returned to Hizan where he taught for five years at the local madrasa, before moving to Siirt as requested by his father. It is said that Xelîlê Sêrtî wished to move to somewhere where the madrasa did not have an influence, but had to return to Siirt. In Siirt, he was a teacher until age sixty and had by then written many scientific and literary works such as Serf, Nehw, Belaxet, Mentiq, Munazere, Cedel, Wed', Eqaîd-Kelam, Hedîs, Fiqh, Tefsîr, Tecwîd, Tesewwuf, Mewlûd and Şemaîlê.

== Bibliography ==
- Adak, Abdurrahman (2010), "Mela Xelîlê Sêrtî: Helbestvanê Bi Mexlesa "Şewqî" û Helbestên wî Yên Kurdî (Kurmancî)", Mukaddime (in Kurdish), vol. 1
- Sönmez, Nesim (2018), Tehlîla Nehcu'l-Enama Mela Xelîlê Sêrtî (in Kurdish and Turkish), vol. 4
