= Yeghrdut Monastery =

Armenian monastery

Yeghrdut monastery Եղրդուտի վանք
- Location within Turkey

Religion
- Affiliation: Armenian Apostolic Church
- Province: Muş Province
- Region: Eastern Anatolia region
- Ecclesiastical or organizational status: Destroyed in 1920
- Status: Ceased functioning as a monastery in 1915

Location
- Location: (Turkey)
- State: Turkey
- Interactive map of Yeghrdut monastery Եղրդուտի վանք
- Coordinates: 38.7834°N 41.2590°E

Architecture
- Type: Church
- Style: Armenian
- Completed: 283 A.D.

Yeghrdut monastery (Armenian: Եղրդուտի վանք, Yeghrduti vank) was an Armenian monastery in the western part of Muş province of modern Turkey, approximately 22 km northwest of Muş city. Built in 283 A.D., it ceased functioning as a monastery after the Armenian genocide in 1915 and got destroyed in 1920.

== Etymology ==
The Yeghrdut Monastery takes its name from the "yeghird" herb which grows in the area. The monastery, was originally called Myuronaman or Shish-Yougho. In Armenian, Myuron or Meron means myrrh, and Myuronaman translates to container of a myrrh. The Armenian Apostolic Church for many centuries used myrrh to prepare the sacramental chrism for christening and funeral rites. Thus the name Yeghrdut means the place of myrrh containers.
Yeghrdut monastery has 2 other names:

1. Surb Hovannes Vank (Armenian: Սուրբ Հովհաննես վանք, Monastery of Saint John).
2. Artzvaberi Surb Nshan (Armenian: Արծվաբերի Ս. Նշան, Saint Sign Brought by the Eagle).

== The exterior ==
The Yeghrdut Monastery consisted of four churches:

- Surb Hovannes Church (main church in the center)
- Surb Astvatzatzin (adjoining from south)
- Surb Grigor Lusavorich (adjoining from northwest)
- Surb Stepanos (adjoining from south to Grigor Lusavorich Church)

The Yeghrudt Monastery was a structure similar in size to the Saint Karapet Monastery.

== History ==
According to Abbot Zenob Glak, several Christian relics were found in the Yeghrdut Woods in Taron district of the Kingdom of Armenia, then under the patronage of King Tiridates. It was at that place from 283-292 A.D that the Yeghrdut Monastery was constructed. In the Middle Ages, the Yeghrdut Monastery became a center of the Yeghrduts' order and had accumulated rich reserves of myrrh. During the 15th and 16th centuries, Yeghrdut was one of Armenia's centers of education. The Matenadaran repository contains at least twenty hand written books originating from the Yeghrdut Monastery. In the 17th and 18th centuries, the monastery had a prestigious school and wide manors. In 1650 the priest Grigor Mshetsi (Gregory from Moush) renovated the Yeghrdut Monastery and added a new two-story building and in 1828 Father Ghazar (Lazarus) added a bell tower. In 1866 an earthquake damaged the monastery; But in the 19th century, the monastery was repaired again and by 1870, due to the efforts of Catholicos Garegin Srvandztyan, the school re-opened. In 1909 the school educated many pupils, including forty orphans. The Yeghrdut Monastery was damaged during the Armenian genocide in 1915 during which time many Armenians were killed by the Turks in the Yeghrdut monastery.

== Legends ==
According to popular belief, the Kingdom of Armenia has an eden-like woodland named Yeghrdut in the Taron district, west of the Muş Valley. The legend states that old men who come there from Muş valley and spend some time in that corner of unearthly beauty would become twenty years younger.

== Current condition ==
The monastery was completely destroyed by the Turkish military years later. There were still remains noted in 1983.

== See also ==
- Arqakaghni monastery
- Monastery of the Miracles
