= Hizan District =

District of Bitlis Province, Turkey

- District
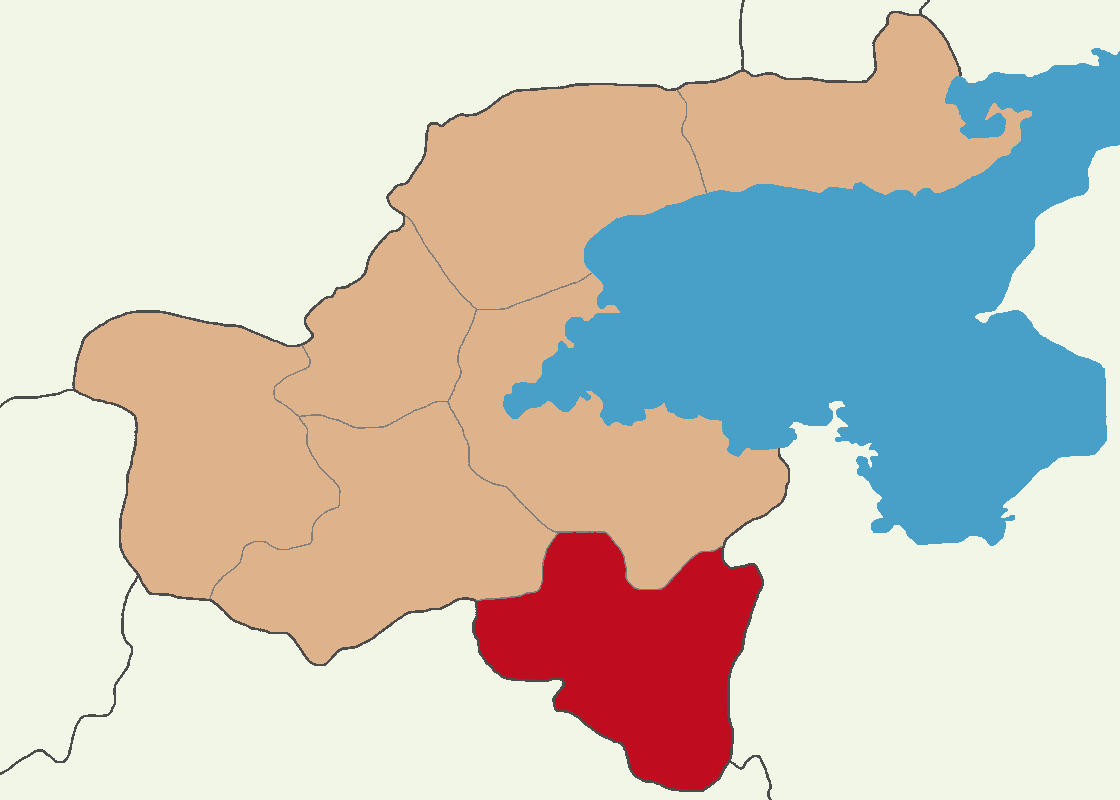
- Map showing Hizan District in Bitlis Province

- Location in Turkey
- Coordinates: 38°14′N 42°26′E
- Country: Turkey
- Province: Bitlis
- Seat: Hizan

Government
  - Kaymakam: Nurhalil Özçelik
- Area: 1,021 km^{2} (394 sq mi)
- Population (2021): 32,586
  - Density: 31.92/km^{2} (82.66/sq mi)
- Time zone: UTC+3 (TRT)
- Website: www.hizan.gov.tr

Hizan District is a district of Bitlis Province of Turkey. Its seat is the town of Hizan. Its area is 1,021 square kilometres (394 sq mi), and its population in 2021 was 32,586.

== Composition ==
There is one municipality in Hizan District:

- Hizan

There are 76 villages in Hizan District:

- Ağılözü
- Akbıyık
- Akça
- Akçevre
- Akdik
- Akşar
- Aladana
- Ballı
- Ballıca
- Bozpınar
- Bölüklü
- Budaklı
- Çalışkanlar
- Çatakdeğirmen
- Çayır
- Çökekyazı
- Dağören
- Dayılar
- Derince
- Doğancı
- Döküktaş
- Ekinli
- Ekintepe
- Elmacık
- Erencik
- Esenler
- Gayda
- Gökay
- Göktepe
- Gönüllü
- Güngören
- Gürece
- Hacımehmet
- Harmandöven
- Horozdere
- İçlikaval
- İncirli
- Kalkanlı
- Kapısuyu
- Karaağaç
- Karbastı
- Karlıtepe
- Kayadeler
- Kayalı
- Kaymaklı
- Keçeli
- Keklik
- Koçlu
- Koçyiğit
- Kolludere
- Koyunlu
- Meydan
- Nuh
- Nurs
- Oğlaklı
- Örgülü
- Ortaca
- Oymapınar
- Sağınlı
- Sağırkaya
- Sarıtaş
- Sarpkaya
- Soğuksu
- Sürücüler
- Süttaşı
- Tutumlu
- Uzuntaş
- Ürünveren
- Yaylacık
- Yelkıran
- Yenicik
- Yığınkaya
- Yoğurtlu
- Yolbilen
- Yukarıayvacık
- Yukarıçalı
