= Monastery of the Miracles =

Armenian monastery in Turkey

Monastery of the Miracles Սքանչելագործ վանք
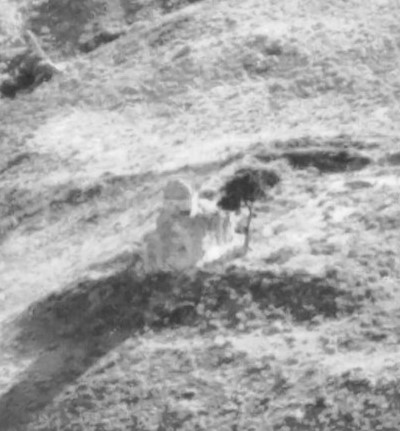

- Location within Turkey

Religion
- Affiliation: Armenian Apostolic Church
- Region: East Anatolia
- Ecclesiastical or organisational status: Destroyed by Turks in 1915
- Status: ceased functioning as a monastery in 1915

Location
- Location: (Turkey) Van province, Armenian highland
- State: Turkey
- Coordinates: 38.9080°N 42.7028°E

Architecture
- Type: Armenian church
- Style: Armenian
- Completed: 8th century

Monastery of the Miracles also known as Monastery of Ardzgue (Armenian: Սքանչելագործ վանք) is a destroyed Armenian monastery on the hills 2.18 miles northwest of Adilcevaz in Bitlis province of modern Turkey, to the north of Lake Van. Built in the 8th century, it was abandoned after the Armenian genocide in 1915.

== History ==
The monastery is mentioned as being famous by Levon Kazanjian in his 1950 book on the geography and history of the area. It is also close to a Urartian town and temple site called Kefkalesi. Blocks of stone used for the monastery and nearby graveyard were taken and reused from the Urartian site. The monastery sits at an elevation of 2,011m above sea level.

The monastery was subordinate in importance in the Van region to the more important monasteries Lim, Ktuts and Varak.

The first written record of the monastery is from the second quarter of the 8th century AD, when the Acts of the Martyrs records that Vahan of Goghthen stayed there. He was the son of a local Armenian ruler and had been taken by Arabs to Syria and raised as a Muslim. He was later sent back to Armenia to govern his territory under Arab suzerainty. However, as soon as he arrived he renounced Islam, returned to Christianity, came to Artzque, and retired into a nearby hermitage called Erashkhavor. His abandonment of Islam would eventually lead to his martyrdom around the year 737.

It is possible that the previous name of the monastery was Holy Protector (Sourp Erashkhavor). The name of the monastery is taken from the presence of certain famous relics at the site which were thought to have healing powers. Until around the 14th century, a relic called the 'Holy Emblem of War' cured pilgrims at the monastery. This relic was then replaced by a piece of a bronze caldron, which the monks supposed had been used to wash Christ after his birth, but was more likely to have been a piece of a Urartian cauldron.

The monastery also housed a scriptorium, which has been identified as the source of around 20 manuscripts.

In 1893 an earthquake hit Adilcevaz, causing damage to nearby houses, though it is unknown if the monastery was also affected. The monastery had already complained about robberies of Armenian churches by local Haydaranlı Kurds when in 1895 it was attacked and looted by Kurds taking part in the Hamidian Massacres. The monastery buildings were restored by the monk Eghiché after a decision in 1902 of the diocesan council of Van, and the last abbot prior to the start of the Armenian genocide was called Father Magar.

== See also ==
- Arqakaghni monastery
- Yeghrdut monastery
