= Arqakaghni monastery =

Armenian monastery in Turkey

Arqakaghni monastery Արքակաղնի վանք
- Location within Turkey

Religion
- Affiliation: Armenian Apostolic Church
- Province: Adana province
- Region: Mediterranean
- Ecclesiastical or organizational status: Destroyed in 1915
- Status: Ceased functioning as a monastery in 1915

Location
- Location: (Turkey)
- State: Turkey
- Interactive map of Arqakaghni monastery Արքակաղնի վանք
- Coordinates: 36.9112°N 35.6953°E

Architecture
- Type: Church
- Style: Armenian
- Completed: 1122 AD

Arqakaghni monastery (Armenian: Արքակաղնի վանք), was an Armenian monastery in the western part of Adana province of modern Turkey, which lies 9 km southeast of Mamestia, a city in the east of Cilician plain. Built in 1122 AD, it ceased functioning as a monastery after the Armenian genocide which began in 1915.

== Etymology ==
The monastery has two different names:

1. Arqakaghni (or Arqakaghin), which in Armenian language means King oak, because the monastery was surrounded by oak trees.
2. Hachoyakatar (Armenian: Հաճոյակատար), which in Armenian language literally means darling ridge, but is identified with Mother of God.

== The Exterior ==
The monastery consisted of several churches, and lay in a forest of oaks, plane and olive trees. The main church was called as Armenian: Surp Astvatzatzin which in Armenian language means Saint Mother of God.

== History ==
Arqakaghni monastery was founded in 1122 near Mopsuestia, an ancient city in Cilician Armenia, as the seat of Mopsuestia's bishop. It also served as:

1. A rich storage of rare medieval Armenian books and manuscripts
2. A medieval school and university
3. The creating house of manuscripts and hand-written books
4. A notable center of Armenian folk and church music.

Some medieval Armenian historians (listed below) eulogized Arqakaghni monastery:

- Vardan Areveltsi (Armenian: Վարդան Արևելցի) (13th century)
- Kirakos Gandzaketsi (Armenian: Կիրակոս Գանձակեցի) (13th century)
- Smbat Gundstabl (Armenian: Սմբատ Գունդստաբլ) (13th century)
- Hovhannes Yerznkatsi (Armenian: Հովհաննես Երզնկացի) (13th century)

Medieval Armenian author and priest Vardan Aygektsi also studied there.

In 1206–08 Arqakaghni monastery became archbishop David Arqakaghneci's residence. Buried at the monastery were Levon II, his father Stephane (Armenian: Ստեփանե), Grigor Apirat., and the Catholicos of the Armenian Church.

A devastating earthquake in 1269 damaged the monastery, but in 1284 the monastery was reconstructed and continued functioning until the Armenian massacres in Adana province when it was damaged again. During the Armenian genocide of 1915, it was destroyed completely by the Turks.

== See also ==
- Monastery of the Miracles
- Yeghrdut monastery
