= Adilcevaz District =

District of Bitlis Province, Turkey

- District
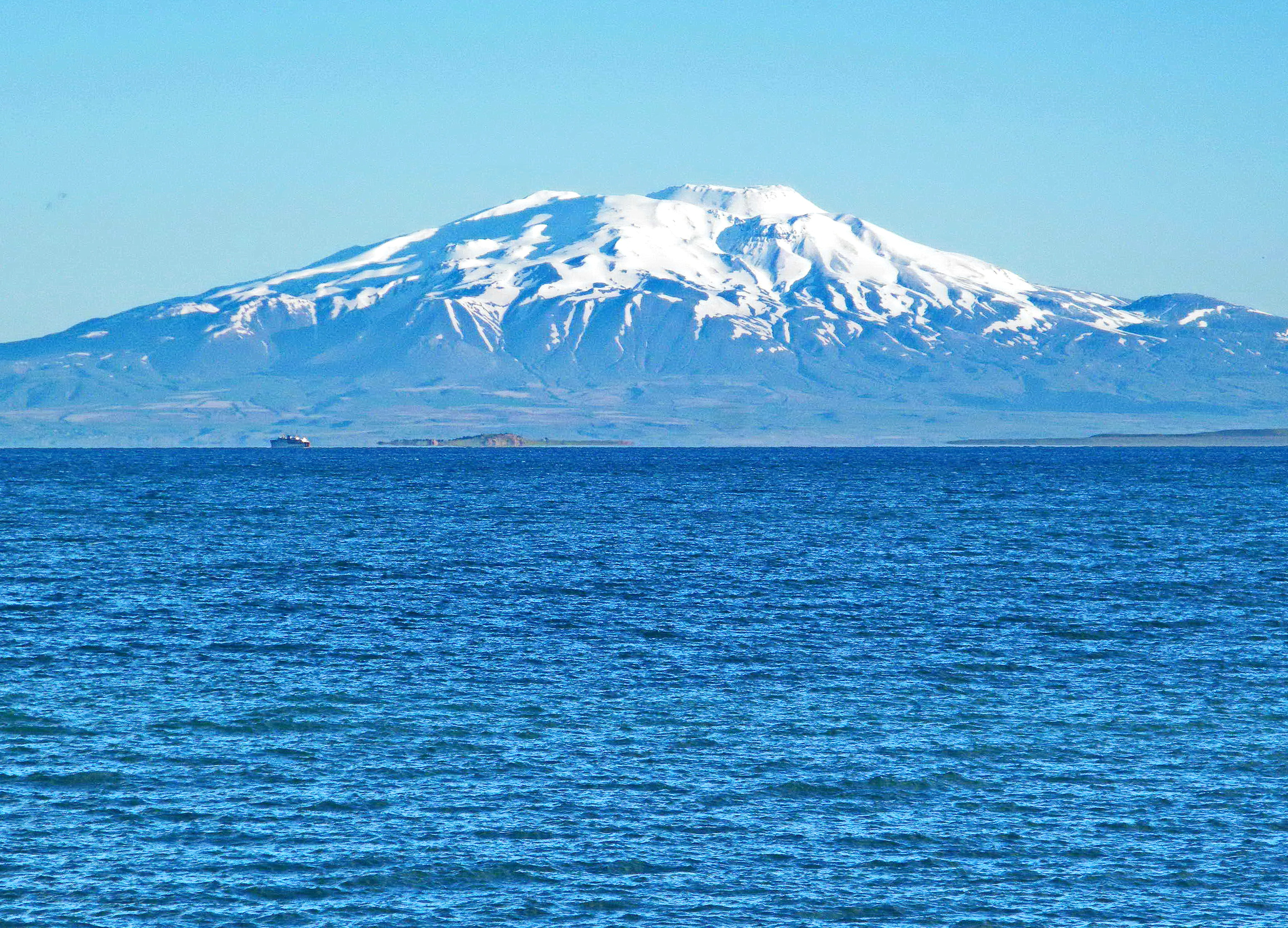
- Mount Süphan

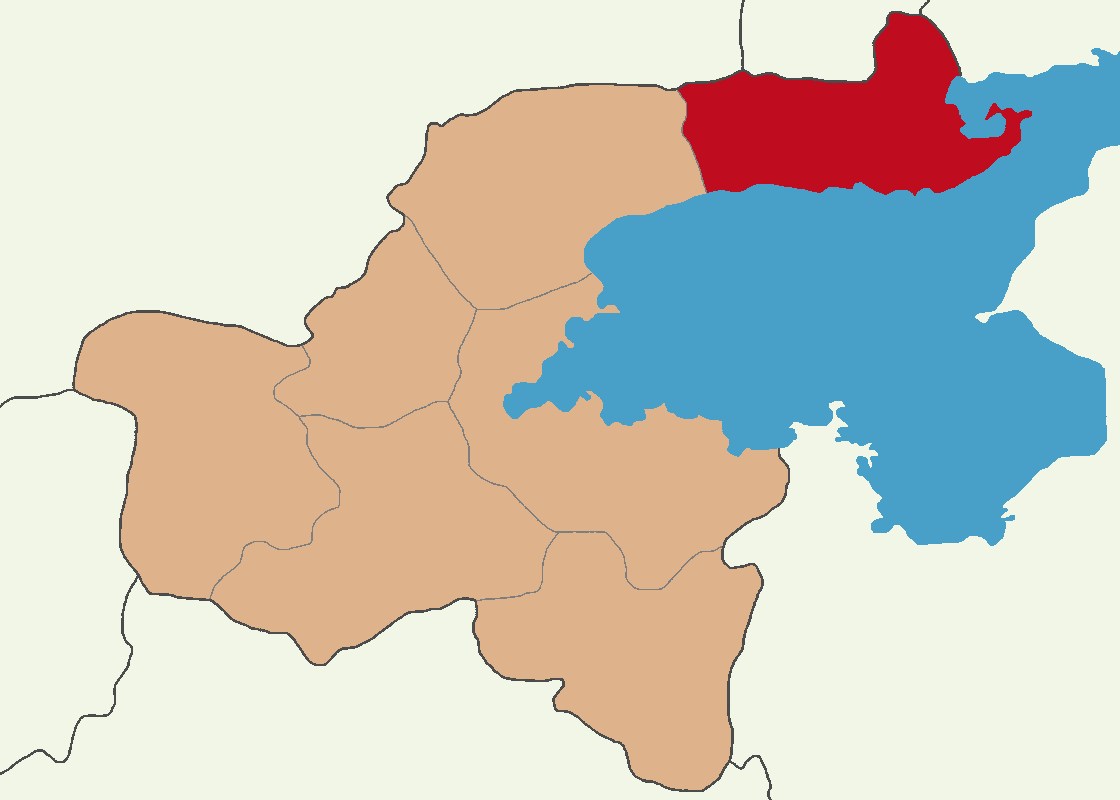
- Map showing Adilcevaz District in Bitlis Province

- Location within Turkey
- Coordinates: 38°48′N 42°45′E
- Country: Turkey
- Province: Bitlis
- Seat: Adilcevaz

Government
  - Kaymakam: İsmail Demir
- Area: 1,586 km^{2} (612 sq mi)
- Population (2021): 30,123
  - Density: 18.99/km^{2} (49.19/sq mi)
- Time zone: UTC+3 (TRT)
- Website: www.adilcevaz.gov.tr

Adilcevaz District is a district of the Bitlis Province of Turkey. Its seat is the town of Adilcevaz. Its area is 1,586 km^{2}, and its population is 30,123 (2021).

== Composition ==
There are two municipalities in Adilcevaz District:

- Adilcevaz
- Aydınlar

There are 28 villages in Adilcevaz District:

- Akçıra
- Akyazı
- Aşağısüphan
- Aygırgölü
- Bahçedere
- Cihangir
- Çanakyayla
- Dizdar
- Erikbağı
- Esenkıyı
- Göldüzü
- Gölüstü
- Gümüşdüven
- Harmantepe
- Heybeli
- İpekçayır
- Karakolköy
- Karaşeyh
- Karşıyaka
- Kavuştuk
- Kömürlü
- Mollafadıl
- Örentaş
- Sefasahil
- Yarımada
- Yıldızköy
- Yolçatı
- Yukarısüphan
