= Oduncular, Güroymak =

Village in Turkey

Oduncular
- Village
- Location in Turkey
- Coordinates: 38°34′6″N 42°10′11″E
- Country: Turkey
- Province: Bitlis
- District: Güroymak
- Population (2021): 1,035
- Time zone: UTC+3 (TRT)

Oduncular (Kurdish: Boryan) is a village in the Güroymak District of Bitlis Province in Turkey. The village is populated by Kurds of the Elîkan tribe and had a population of 1,035 in 2021.
