= Çıtak, Güroymak =

Village in Turkey

Çıtak
- Village
- Country: Turkey
- Province: Bitlis
- District: Güroymak
- Population (2021): 447
- Time zone: UTC+3 (TRT)

Çıtak is a village in the Güroymak District of Bitlis Province in Turkey. Its population is 447 (2021).
