= Mollafadıl, Adilcevaz =

Village in Turkey

Mollafadıl
- Village
- Location in Turkey
- Coordinates: 39°01′N 42°58′E
- Country: Turkey
- Province: Bitlis
- District: Adilcevaz
- Population (2021): 185
- Time zone: UTC+3 (TRT)

Mollafadıl is a village in the Adilcevaz District of Bitlis Province in Turkey. Its population is 185 (2021).
