= Yukarıkolbaşı, Güroymak =

Village in Turkey

Yukarıkolbaşı
- Village
- Location in Turkey
- Coordinates: 38°31′0″N 42°5′45″E
- Country: Turkey
- Province: Bitlis
- District: Güroymak
- Population (2021): 524
- Time zone: UTC+3 (TRT)

Yukarıkolbaşı is a village in the Güroymak District of Bitlis Province in Turkey. Its population is 524 (2021).
