= Kaleli, Güroymak =

Village in Turkey

Kaleli
- Village
- Location in Turkey
- Coordinates: 38.547222°N 42.021111°E
- Country: Turkey
- Province: Bitlis
- District: Güroymak
- Population (2021): 493
- Time zone: UTC+3 (TRT)

Kaleli is a village in the Güroymak District of Bitlis Province in Turkey. Its population is 493 (2021).
