= Akıncı, Mutki =

Akıncı
- Village
- Location in Turkey
- Coordinates: 38.4217°N 41.9008°E
- Country: Turkey
- Province: Bitlis
- District: Mutki
- Population (2021): 175
- Time zone: UTC+3 (TRT)

Akıncı is a village the Mutki District of Bitlis Province in Turkey. Its population is 175 (2021).
