= Gümüşdüven, Adilcevaz =

Village in Turkey

Gümüşdüven
- Village
- Location in Turkey
- Coordinates: 38°58′49″N 43°0′39″E
- Country: Turkey
- Province: Bitlis
- District: Adilcevaz
- Population (2022): 519
- Time zone: UTC+3 (TRT)

Gümüşdüven (Kurdish: Hêkesor) is a village in the Adilcevaz District of Bitlis Province in Turkey. The village is populated by Kurds and had a population of 519 in 2022.

It formerly had an Armenian population.
