= Çiğdemalan, Mutki =

Çiğdemalan
- Village
- Location in Turkey
- Coordinates: 38°17′N 41°47′E
- Country: Turkey
- Province: Bitlis
- District: Mutki
- Population (2021): 494
- Time zone: UTC+3 (TRT)

Çiğdemalan is a village the Mutki District of Bitlis Province in Turkey. Its population is 494 (2021).
