= Döküktaş, Hizan =

Village in Turkey

Döküktaş
- Village
- Location in Turkey
- Coordinates: 38°00′N 42°38′E
- Country: Turkey
- Province: Bitlis
- District: Hizan
- Population (2021): 1,055
- Time zone: UTC+3 (TRT)

Döküktaş is a village in the Hizan District of Bitlis Province in Turkey. Its population is 1,055 (2021).
