= Çanakyayla, Adilcevaz =

Village in Turkey

Çanakyayla
- Village
- Location in Turkey
- Coordinates: 38°54′N 42°42′E
- Country: Turkey
- Province: Bitlis
- District: Adilcevaz
- Population (2021): 382
- Time zone: UTC+3 (TRT)

Çanakyayla is a village in the Adilcevaz District of Bitlis Province in Turkey. Its population is 382 (2021).
