= Akçaağaç, Mutki =

Akçaağaç
- Village
- Location in Turkey
- Coordinates: 38.5508°N 41.6292°E
- Country: Turkey
- Province: Bitlis
- District: Mutki
- Population (2021): 408
- Time zone: UTC+3 (TRT)

Akçaağaç is a village the Mutki District of Bitlis Province in Turkey. Its population is 408 (2021).
