= İkizler, Mutki =

Village in Bitlis Province, Turkey

İkizler
- Village
- Location in Turkey
- Coordinates: 38°33′48″N 41°36′39″E
- Country: Turkey
- Province: Bitlis
- District: Mutki
- Population (2021): 1,264
- Time zone: UTC+3 (TRT)

İkizler is a village the Mutki District of Bitlis Province in Turkey. Its population is 1,264 (2021).
