= Yarımada, Adilcevaz =

Village in Turkey

Yarımada
- Village
- Location in Turkey
- Coordinates: 38°51′35″N 43°08′41″E
- Country: Turkey
- Province: Bitlis
- District: Adilcevaz
- Population (2021): 278
- Time zone: UTC+3 (TRT)

Yarımada, formerly Karakeşiş, is a village in the Adilcevaz District of Bitlis Province in Turkey. The village is populated by Kurds of the Bekiran tribe and had a population of 278 in 2021.

It formerly had an Armenian population.
