= Gölüstü, Adilcevaz =

Village in Turkey

Gölüstü
- Village
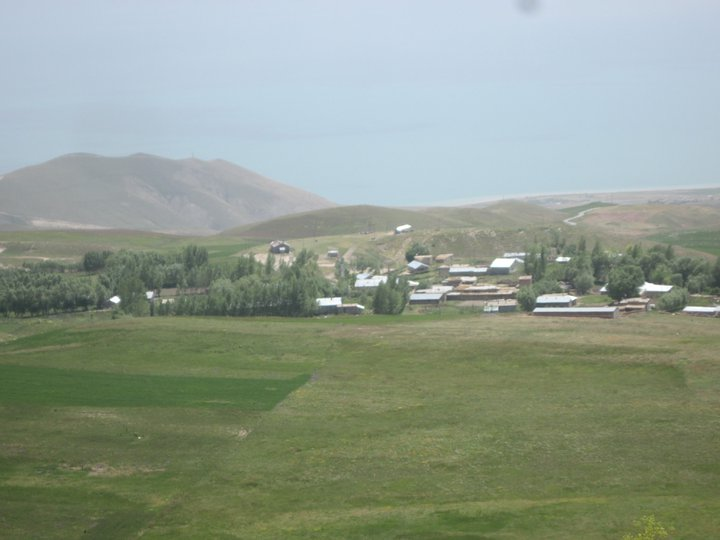

- Location within Turkey
- Coordinates: 38°50′31″N 42°38′36″E
- Country: Turkey
- Province: Bitlis
- District: Adilcevaz
- Population (2022): 145
- Time zone: UTC+3 (TRT)

Gölüstü (Kurdish: Manik) is a village in the Adilcevaz District of Bitlis Province in Turkey. The village is populated by Kurds and had a population of 145 in 2022.

It formerly had an Armenian population.
