= Akçıra, Adilcevaz =

Village in Turkey

Akçıra
- Village
- Location in Turkey
- Coordinates: 38°50′58″N 43°5′49″E
- Country: Turkey
- Province: Bitlis
- District: Adilcevaz
- Population (2022): 1,018
- Time zone: UTC+3 (TRT)

Akçıra (Kurdish: Axçira) is a village in the Adilcevaz District of Bitlis Province in Turkey. The village is populated by Kurds of the Bekiran tribe and had a population of 1,018 in 2022.

It formerly had an Armenian population.
