= Çallı, Güroymak =

Village in Turkey

Çallı
- Village
- Location in Turkey
- Coordinates: 38.5236°N 41.9436°E
- Country: Turkey
- Province: Bitlis
- District: Güroymak
- Population (2021): 54
- Time zone: UTC+3 (TRT)

Çallı (Kurdish: Pertuk) is a village in the Güroymak District of Bitlis Province in Turkey. The village is populated by Kurds of the Bekiran tribe and had a population of 54 in 2021.
