= Cevizyatağı, Güroymak =

Village in Turkey

Cevizyatağı
- Village
- Location in Turkey
- Coordinates: 38°29′47″N 41°57′30″E
- Country: Turkey
- Province: Bitlis
- District: Güroymak
- Population (2021): 117
- Time zone: UTC+3 (TRT)

Cevizyatağı is a village in the Güroymak District of Bitlis Province in Turkey. Its population is 117 (2021).
