= Akpınar, Mutki =

Akpınar
- Village
- Location in Turkey
- Coordinates: 38.5069°N 41.7169°E
- Country: Turkey
- Province: Bitlis
- District: Mutki
- Population (2021): 251
- Time zone: UTC+3 (TRT)

Akpınar is a village the Mutki District of Bitlis Province in Turkey. Its population is 251 (2021).
