= Çalışkanlar, Hizan =

Village in Turkey

Çalışkanlar
- Village
- Location in Turkey
- Coordinates: 38.1263°N 42.4722°E
- Country: Turkey
- Province: Bitlis
- District: Hizan
- Population (2021): 145
- Time zone: UTC+3 (TRT)

Çalışkanlar is a village in the Hizan District of Bitlis Province in Turkey. Its population is 145 (2021).
