= Dəmirçi, Nakhchivan =

Dəmirçi
- Municipality
- Location within Azerbaijan
- Coordinates: 39°36′39″N 44°56′03″E
- Country: Azerbaijan
- Autonomous republic: Nakhchivan
- District: Sadarak

Population (2005)
  - Total: 5,092
- Time zone: UTC+4 (AZT)

Dəmirçi (Damirchi) is a village in the Sadarak District of Nakhchivan Autonomous Republic, Azerbaijan. It is located in the near of the Nakhchivan-Sadarak highway, 11 km in the north-west from the district center, on the Sharur plain. Its population is busy with grain-growing, vegetable-growing, beet-growing and animal husbandry. There are two secondary schools, cultural house, library, kindergarten, hospital and a "Binamaz Əhməd" sacred place of 18th century in the village. It has a population of 5,092. It is the closest settlement to Azerbaijan's only crossing point to Turkey, an important lifeline for the Nakhchivan exclave after the closure of the Armenian border following the First Nagorno-Karabakh War.

== Etymology ==
The name of Dəmirçi (Damirchi) village is supposed to be associated with the Turkic tribe of dəmirçilər (damirchis). According to the information of the historian Shihabaddin Nasavi (13th century) the Turks have been moved to the Arran and Mughan (name of Dəmircilər also is mentioned among them) by the Seljuk Sultan Malik Shah "... plains, mountains, fortresses ... they have been spread.". In the 16th century, they lived in the around the city of Kars in the Turkey. According to Azerbaijani historian М.М. Khazani (19th century), the Dəmirçilər have been moved to Azerbaijan at the era of Panah Ali Khan. They were settled in the Iravan region and also in the Nakhchivan in the 19th century. The villages of Dəmirçi in the districts of Şuşa, Şamaxı, Kəlbəcər, Fizuli and Şərur of Azerbaijan is related with Dəmircilər tribe.
