= Yalıntaş, Mutki =

Yalıntaş
- Village
- Location within Turkey
- Coordinates: 38.5647°N 41.8222°E
- Country: Turkey
- Province: Bitlis
- District: Mutki
- Population (2021): 755
- Time zone: UTC+3 (TRT)

Yalıntaş is a village in the Mutki District of Bitlis Province in Turkey. Its population is 755 (2021). It has an elevation of 1,700 metres above sea level.

The village is populated by Arabs of the Bidri tribe.
