= Tahtalı, Güroymak =

Village in Turkey

Tahtalı
- Village
- Country: Turkey
- Province: Bitlis
- District: Güroymak
- Population (2021): 412
- Time zone: UTC+3 (TRT)

Tahtalı is a village in the Güroymak District of Bitlis Province in Turkey. Its population is 412 (2021).
