= Sütderesi, Güroymak =

Village in Turkey

Sütderesi
- Village
- Location in Turkey
- Coordinates: 38°36′N 42°01′E
- Country: Turkey
- Province: Bitlis
- District: Güroymak
- Population (2021): 195
- Time zone: UTC+3 (TRT)

Sütderesi is a village in the Güroymak District of Bitlis Province in Turkey. Its population is 195 (2021).
