= Açıkalan, Mutki =

Açıkalan
- Village
- Location in Turkey
- Coordinates: 38.3415°N 41.8323°E
- Country: Turkey
- Province: Bitlis
- District: Mutki
- Population (2021): 302
- Time zone: UTC+3 (TRT)

Açıkalan is a village in the Mutki District of Bitlis Province in Turkey. Its population was 302 in 2021.
