= Kekliktepe, Güroymak =

Village in Turkey

Kekliktepe
- Village
- Location in Turkey
- Coordinates: 38.535°N 42.075°E
- Country: Turkey
- Province: Bitlis
- District: Güroymak
- Population (2021): 162
- Time zone: UTC+3 (TRT)

Kekliktepe (Kurdish: Misurî) is a village in the Güroymak District of Bitlis Province in Turkey. The village is populated by Kurds of the Bekiran tribe and had a population of 162 in 2021.
