= Karaşeyh, Adilcevaz =

Village in Turkey

Karaşeyh
- Village
- Location in Turkey
- Coordinates: 38°59′3″N 42°58′26″E
- Country: Turkey
- Province: Bitlis
- District: Adilcevaz
- Population (2021): 351
- Time zone: UTC+3 (TRT)

Karaşeyh (Kurdish: Qereşêx) is a village in the Adilcevaz District of Bitlis Province in Turkey. The village is populated by Kurds and had a population of 351 in 2022.

It formerly had an Armenian population.
