= Erler, Mutki =

Erler
- Village
- Location within Turkey
- Country: Turkey
- Province: Bitlis
- District: Mutki
- Population (2021): 920
- Time zone: UTC+3 (TRT)

Erler is a village the Mutki District of Bitlis Province in Turkey. Its population is 920 (2021).
