= Doğancı, Hizan =

Village in Turkey

Doğancı
- Village
- Location within Turkey
- Country: Turkey
- Province: Bitlis
- District: Hizan
- Population (2021): 118
- Time zone: UTC+3 (TRT)

Doğancı is a village in the Hizan District of Bitlis Province in Turkey. Its population is 118 (2021).
