= Çayarası, Güroymak =

Village in Turkey

Çayarası
- Village
- Country: Turkey
- Province: Bitlis
- District: Güroymak
- Population (2021): 417
- Time zone: UTC+3 (TRT)

Çayarası is a village in the Güroymak District of Bitlis Province in Turkey. Its population is 417 (2021).
