= Yukarısüphan, Adilcevaz =

Village in Turkey

Yukarısüphan
- Village
- Location in Turkey
- Coordinates: 38°49′32″N 42°51′37″E
- Country: Turkey
- Province: Bitlis
- District: Adilcevaz
- Population (2021): 797
- Time zone: UTC+3 (TRT)

Yukarısüphan (Kurdish: Sîpanê jor) is a village in the Adilcevaz District of Bitlis Province in Turkey. The village is populated by Kurds and had a population of 797 in 2021.

It formerly had an Armenian population.
