= Yolçatı, Adilcevaz =

Village in Bitlis Province, Turkey

Yolçatı
- Village
- Location in Turkey
- Coordinates: 38.796°N 42.828°E
- Country: Turkey
- Province: Bitlis
- District: Adilcevaz
- Population (2021): 288
- Time zone: UTC+3 (TRT)

Yolçatı, formerly Koxis, is a village in the Adilcevaz District of Bitlis Province in Turkey. The village is populated by Kurds and Ossetians and had a population of 288 in 2021.
