= Değirmenköy, Güroymak =

Village in Turkey

Değirmenköy
- Village
- Location in Turkey
- Coordinates: 38°36′5″N 41°59′30″E
- Country: Turkey
- Province: Bitlis
- District: Güroymak
- Population (2021): 2,417
- Time zone: UTC+3 (TRT)

Değirmenköy (also: Değirmen) is a village in the Güroymak District of Bitlis Province in Turkey. Its population is 2,417 (2021).
