= Göldüzü, Adilcevaz =

Village in Turkey

Göldüzü
- Village
- Location in Turkey
- Coordinates: 38°49′03″N 43°01′14″E
- Country: Turkey
- Province: Bitlis
- District: Adilcevaz
- Population (2021): 1,675
- Time zone: UTC+3 (TRT)

Göldüzü (Armenian: Առէն, romanized: Aṙēn, Kurdish: Arîn) is a village in the Adilcevaz District of Bitlis Province in Turkey. The village is populated by Kurds and it had a population of 1,675 in 2021.

It formerly had an Armenian population.
