= Yemişveren, Güroymak =

Village in Turkey

Yemişveren
- Village
- Location in Turkey
- Coordinates: 38°31′N 42°01′E
- Country: Turkey
- Province: Bitlis
- District: Güroymak
- Population (2021): 462
- Time zone: UTC+3 (TRT)

Yemişveren is a village in the Güroymak District of Bitlis Province in Turkey. Its population is 462 (2021).
