= Yazıkonak, Güroymak =

Village in Turkey

Yazıkonak
- Village
- Country: Turkey
- Province: Bitlis
- District: Güroymak
- Population (2021): 240
- Time zone: UTC+3 (TRT)

Yazıkonak is a village in the Güroymak District of Bitlis Province in Turkey. Its population is 240 (2021).
