= Derince, Hizan =

Village in Turkey

Derince
- Village
- Country: Turkey
- Province: Bitlis
- District: Hizan
- Population (2021): 144
- Time zone: UTC+3 (TRT)

Derince is a village in the Hizan District of Bitlis Province in Turkey. Its population is 144 (2021).
