= Erikbağı, Adilcevaz =

Village in Turkey

Erikbağı
- Village
- Location in Turkey
- Coordinates: 38°47′21″N 42°52′28″E
- Country: Turkey
- Province: Bitlis
- District: Adilcevaz
- Population (2022): 2,226
- Time zone: UTC+3 (TRT)

Erikbağı (Kurdish: Koçerî) is a village in the Adilcevaz District of Bitlis Province in Turkey. The village is populated by Kurds and had a population of 226 in 2022.

It formerly had an Armenian population.
