= Güzelli, Güroymak =

Village in Turkey

Güzelli
- Village
- Location in Turkey
- Coordinates: 38°39′26″N 42°5′58″E
- Country: Turkey
- Province: Bitlis
- District: Güroymak
- Population (2021): 970
- Time zone: UTC+3 (TRT)

Güzelli (Kurdish: Serêşive) is a village in the Güroymak District of Bitlis Province in Turkey. The village is populated by Kurds of the Bekiran tribe and had a population of 970 in 2021.
