= Karşıyaka, Adana =

Karşıyaka Verâ-yı Cisr
- Quarter (Turkish: Semt)
- Interactive map of Karşıyaka
- Coordinates: 36°58′41.00″N 35°20′16″E
- Country: Turkey
- Region: Cilicia
- Province: Adana
- District: Yüreğir
- Elevation: 25 m (82 ft)

Population (2022)
  - Total: 99,841
- Time zone: UTC+3 (TRT)
- Area code: 0322

Karşıyaka (pronounced [kaɾʃɯˈjaka]), formerly Verâ-yı Cisr, is a quarter in the Yüreğir district of the city of Adana. The quarter is on the banks of Seyhan river, just across the old town.

Settled in early 19th century, Karşıyaka is the first expansion of Adana to the east bank of Seyhan River. During the Egyptian rule of Adana (1833-1840), neighborhood was founded for the Alawites that had migrated from Syria. It is bordered by D400 state road on the north, Seyhan river on the west and Yüreğir Canal on the east. Karşıyaka State Hospital is the main healthcare facility of the quarter.

== Etymology ==
Karşıyaka name meaning 'the other side', is named for the area after the foundation of the republic, as the area stood at the other side of the old town. The original name of the quarter, Verâ-yı Cisr, is in Ottoman Turkish meaning 'beyond the bridge'.

== Governance ==
The quarter of Karşıyaka, is an area of the city, not a level of government. The quarter is made up of 14 neighbourhoods and each neighbourhood is administered by the Muhtar and the Seniors Council. The neighborhoods of Karşıyaka are; Cumhuriyet, Yamaçlı, Seyhan, Haydaroğlu, Bahçelievler, Akdeniz, Güneşli, Anadolu, Dede Korkut, Yunus Emre, 19 Mayıs, Yeşilbağlar, Koza and Başak.

== Demographics ==
The population of Karşıyaka as of December 2022 is 99,841. Traditionally an Arab area, Karşıyaka has seen mass migration of Kurds during 1990s.

Neighborhood	Population (2022)
19 Mayıs	18,261
Akdeniz	5,979
Anadolu	7,104
Bahçelievler	8,864
Başak	5,317
Cumhuriyet	6,427
Dede Korkut	4,485
Güneşli	3,756
Haydaroğlu	6,639
Koza	8,336
Seyhan	5,246
Yamaçlı	5,845
Yeşilbağlar	7,576
Yunus Emre	6,006
Quarter total	99,841

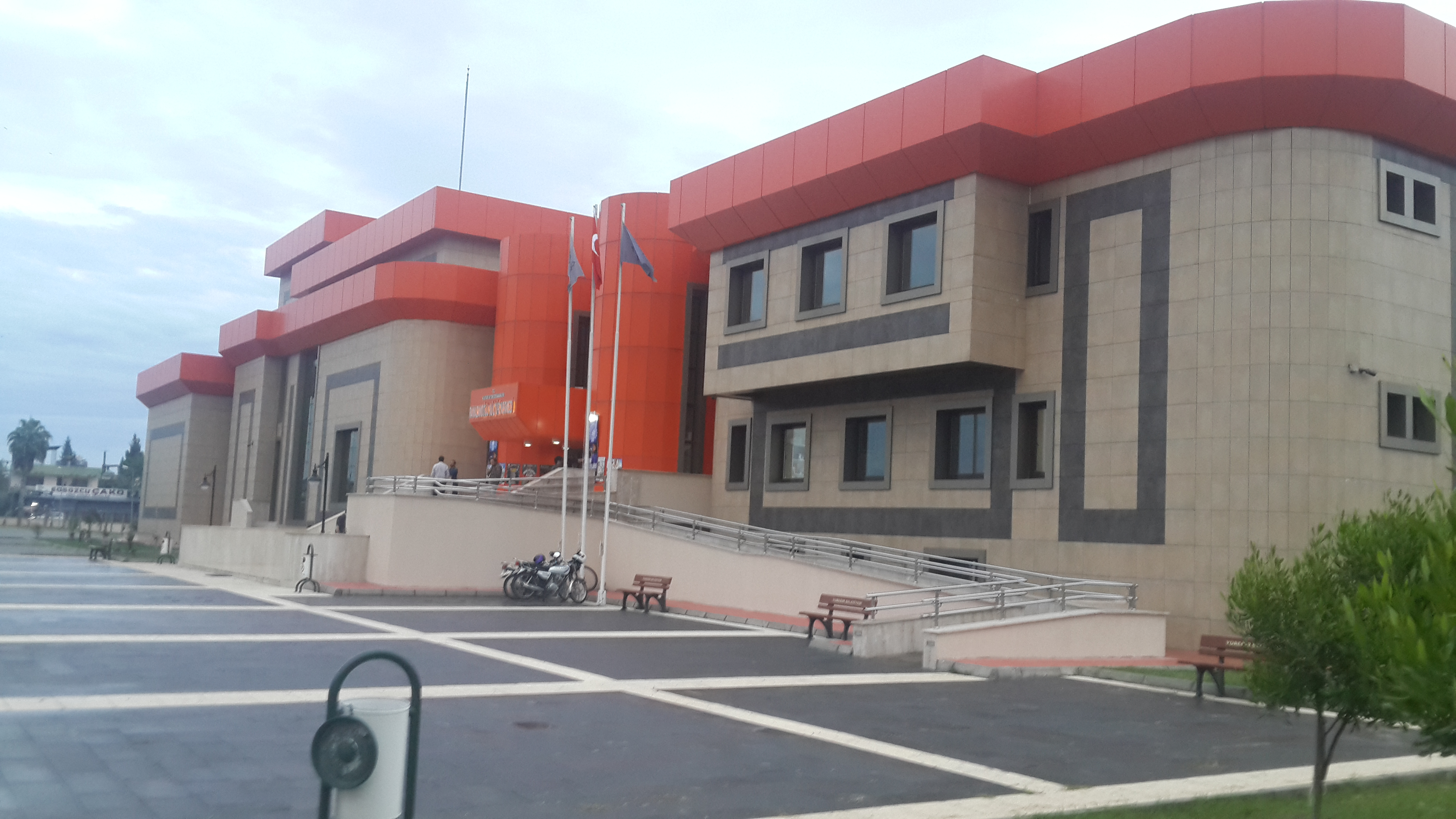
Ramazanoğlu Cultural Center

== Culture ==
Ramazanoğlu Cultural Center, is the cultural complex of Karşıyaka, founded by the Ministry of Culture and Tourism. The centre has a theatre hall, library and two exhibition halls. Adana Town Theatre performs regularly at the centre.

== Sports ==
Adana Karşıyaka SK and Seyhan Gücü are the football clubs of Karşıyaka, both performing at the Adana Football League. The venue of Karşıyaka SK is the Akdeniz Stadium. Peyami Safa Maracı Stadium, located at the shores of Seyhan river hosts Seyhan Gücü.

== Transport ==
The metro station of Karşıyaka is Cumhuriyet Station, at the intersection of Karataş Road and the Regülatör Bridge.

Adana Metropolitan Municipality Bus Department (ABBO) has bus routes from downtown Adana to neighbourhoods of Karşıyaka. Minibuses to Karataş depart from Karşıyaka.
