= Dayılar, Hizan =

Village in Turkey

Dayılar
- Village
- Country: Turkey
- Province: Bitlis
- District: Hizan
- Population (2021): 274
- Time zone: UTC+3 (TRT)

Dayılar is a village in the Hizan District of Bitlis Province in Turkey. Its population is 274 (2021).
