= Aşağısüphan, Adilcevaz =

Village in Turkey

Aşağısüphan
- Village
- Location in Turkey
- Coordinates: 38°49′22″N 42°52′29″E
- Country: Turkey
- Province: Bitlis
- District: Adilcevaz
- Population (2022): 1,058
- Time zone: UTC+3 (TRT)
- Postal code: 13500

Aşağısüphan (Kurdish: Sîpanê jêr) is a village in the Adilcevaz District of Bitlis Province in Turkey. The village is populated by Kurds of the Bekiran tribe and had a population of 1,058 in 2022.

It formerly had an Armenian population.
