= İpekçayır, Adilcevaz =

Village in Turkey

İpekçayır
- Village
- Location within Turkey
- Coordinates: 38°49′31″N 42°37′59″E
- Country: Turkey
- Province: Bitlis
- District: Adilcevaz
- Population (2022): 183
- Time zone: UTC+3 (TRT)

İpekçayır (Kurdish: Mirxûs) a village in the Adilcevaz District of Bitlis Province in Turkey. The village is populated by Kurds and had a population of 183 in 2022.

It formerly had an Armenian population.
