= Akyazı, Adilcevaz =

Village in Turkey

Akyazı
- Village
- Location in Turkey
- Coordinates: 38.9842°N 42.9911°E
- Country: Turkey
- Province: Bitlis
- District: Adilcevaz
- Population (2021): 345
- Time zone: UTC+3 (TRT)

Akyazı (Kurdish: Zirkêt) is a village in the Adilcevaz District of Bitlis Province in Turkey. The village is populated by Kurds and had a population of 345 in 2022.

It formerly had an Armenian population.
