= Kavuştuk, Adilcevaz =

Village in Turkey

Kavuştuk
- Village
- Location in Turkey
- Coordinates: 38°49′N 43°04′E
- Country: Turkey
- Province: Bitlis
- District: Adilcevaz
- Population (2021): 952
- Time zone: UTC+3 (TRT)

Kavuştuk (Armenian: Առնջկուս, romanized: Aṙnǰkus, Kurdish: Arinkûs) is a village in the Adilcevaz District of Bitlis Province in Turkey. The village is populated by Kurds of the Bekiran tribe and had a population of 952 in 2021.
