= Esenkıyı, Adilcevaz =

Village in Turkey

Esenkıyı
- Village
- Location in Turkey
- Coordinates: 38°47′23″N 43°0′15″E
- Country: Turkey
- Province: Bitlis
- District: Adilcevaz
- Population (2022): 220
- Time zone: UTC+3 (TRT)

Esenkıyı, formerly Pargad, is a village in the Adilcevaz District of Bitlis Province in Turkey. The village is populated by Kurds and had a population of 220 in 2022.

It formerly had an Armenian population.
