= Kavakbaşı =

- Municipality
- Location in Turkey
- Coordinates: 38°28′52″N 41°48′50″E
- Country: Turkey
- Province: Bitlis
- District: Mutki
- Population (2021): 2,529
- Time zone: UTC+3 (TRT)

Kavakbaşı (Armenian: Տափ, romanized: Tap) is a town (belde) in Mutki District, Bitlis Province, Turkey. Its population is 2,529 (2021).
