= Akbıyık, Hizan =

Village in Turkey

Akbıyık
- Village
- Location in Turkey
- Coordinates: 38.1989°N 42.3441°E
- Country: Turkey
- Province: Bitlis
- District: Hizan
- Population (2021): 257
- Time zone: UTC+3 (TRT)

Akbıyık (Êkuh) is a Kurdish village in the Hizan District of Bitlis Province in Turkey. Its population is 257 (2021).
