= Yıldızköy, Adilcevaz =

Village in Turkey

Yıldızköy
- Village
- Country: Turkey
- Province: Bitlis
- District: Adilcevaz
- Population (2021): 38
- Time zone: UTC+3 (TRT)

Yıldızköy is a village in the Adilcevaz District of Bitlis Province in Turkey. Its population is 38 (2021).
