= Saklı, Güroymak =

Village in Turkey

Saklı
- Village
- Country: Turkey
- Province: Bitlis
- District: Güroymak
- Population (2021): 475
- Time zone: UTC+3 (TRT)

Saklı is a village in the Güroymak District of Bitlis Province in Turkey. Its population is 475 (2021).
