= Özkavak, Güroymak =

Village in Turkey

Özkavak
- Village
- Location in Turkey
- Coordinates: 38°40′N 42°04′E
- Country: Turkey
- Province: Bitlis
- District: Güroymak
- Population (2021): 457
- Time zone: UTC+3 (TRT)

Özkavak is a village in the Güroymak District of Bitlis Province in Turkey. Its population is 457 (2021).
