= Arpacık, Güroymak =

Village in Turkey

Arpacık
- Village
- Location in Turkey
- Coordinates: 38.5095°N 42.0959°E
- Country: Turkey
- Province: Bitlis
- District: Güroymak
- Population (2021): 254
- Time zone: UTC+3 (TRT)

Arpacık is a village in the Güroymak District of Bitlis Province in Turkey. Its population is 254 (2021).
