= Kuştaşı, Güroymak =

Village in Turkey

Kuştaşı
- Village
- Location in Turkey
- Coordinates: 38°30′N 42°05′E
- Country: Turkey
- Province: Bitlis
- District: Güroymak
- Population (2021): 337
- Time zone: UTC+3 (TRT)

Kuştaşı is a village in the Güroymak District of Bitlis Province in Turkey. Its population is 337 (2021).
