= Hizan =

- Municipality
- Location within Turkey
- Coordinates: 38°13′32″N 42°25′37″E
- Country: Turkey
- Province: Bitlis
- District: Hizan

Government
  - Mayor: Yahya Şam (Justice and Development Party)
- Population (2021): 12,409
- Time zone: UTC+3 (TRT)
- Postal code: 13600
- Website: www.hizan.bel.tr

Hizan (Armenian: Խիզան, romanized: Khizan; Kurdish: Xîzan) is a town in Bitlis Province, Turkey. It is the seat of Hizan District. Its population is 12,409 (2021).

The town is populated by Kurds of the Bekiran tribe.

== History ==
Hizan is located in the valley of the Gindig Su, a tributary of the Botan River. In this area, the Gindig Su generally flows from north to south, but its course is very snaky and "often deflected by the butts of the mountain crests". Its valley is steep and rocky and, at least historically, covered with oak trees. This area, along with the neighboring district of Müküs, formed part of the ancient province of Moxoene. The Hizan district was historically somewhat remote and isolated - especially the side valleys of tributary streams, which are separated from each other by mountains and historically formed a place for Christian monasteries. However, during the Middle Ages, some caravan traffic passed through the valley as an alternative to the Bitlis pass. The route came from Siirt, crossed the ridge on the valley's west side, and then reached the old town of Hizan before then branching in two - the main route went northwest to the Güzel Dere ("beautiful creek"), while a side route went east to the Müküs valley.

Eski Hizan, the old site of Hizan, is located at the opening of one of the side valleys. The site is now occupied by the village of Sirmaçek. The old town walls are 230 m from east to west and 200 m from north to south; immediately below the north wall is a ravine which would have determined the shape of the fortifications. The rectangular shape may indicate an ancient Roman foundation (or re-foundation of an earlier site), during the period from 298 to 363 when they controlled Moxoene. Most of the walls and towers, however, date from much later, probably from the 15th-16th centuries. The walls are still standing to their original height on most of the south and west sides, but on the north side only the foundations remain.

Beginning in perhaps the mid-13th century, Hizan was the capital of a Kurdish emirate. Probably during the 15th and 16th centuries, the emirs had the resources to undertake a rebuilding of the town's fortifications. Also around this time, the emir Dawud had the town's medrese built. Located at the center of the old town, the medrese is now used as a hospital and morgue.

At the beginning of the Ottoman rule of Hizan, the town served as an imperial mint. Some of the town's fortifications were also built during this time.

== Government ==
In the local elections in March 2024, Yahya Şam from the Justice and Development Party (AK Party) was elected mayor.

=== Education ===
In the district exists the Hizan Public Education Center, where several courses are offered.

==== Curfews ====
In the villages of the district, several curfews were announced and imposed by the Governor of Bitlis Province.

== Demographics ==
In 1895 the district of Hizan counted dozens of Armenian villages. The majority of the Christian Armenian population was either killed or forced to convert to Islam, according to the Catholikos of Aghtamar. In the records of the Ottoman Government, in 1914 the population was 70% Muslim and 30% Christian. The Christian population may have been underestimated by the Ottoman authorities and the actual proportion could be over 50%. On the eve of the First World War, the Armenian Patriarchate of Constantinople recorded 8,207 Armenians in 76 localities in the kaza, with 48 churches, ten monasteries and 14 schools. In 1915, the nahiye of Sparkert (today Sağınlı and Sürücüler) had a population of 4,000, including 2,600 Armenians, maintaining the monasteries of Bazenits (Bazmenits), Surb Astvatsatsin (Holy Mother of God), Geghis, Surb Kirakos, Surb Gevorg of Shirin (Surb Skavarak), Sorva, Surb Astvatsatsin (Holy Mother of God; Nzar). According to Russian brigadier general Vladimir Teofilovich Mayevski, many Armenians in Hizan didn't speak Armenian but Kurdish.

Mother tongue, Hizan District, 1927 Turkish census
Turkish	Arabic	Kurdish	Circassian	Armenian	Unknown or other languages
196	515	8,211	–	–	–

Religion, Hizan District, 1927 Turkish census
Muslim	Armenian	Jewish	Other Christian
8,408	–	–	–

== Climate ==
Climate data for Hizan
Month	Jan	Feb	Mar	Apr	May	Jun	Jul	Aug	Sep	Oct	Nov	Dec	Year
Mean daily maximum °C (°F)	2.1 (35.8)	3.4 (38.1)	7.4 (45.3)	13.6 (56.5)	19.6 (67.3)	26.0 (78.8)	30.7 (87.3)	30.6 (87.1)	26.3 (79.3)	18.6 (65.5)	10.9 (51.6)	4.6 (40.3)	16.2 (61.1)
Mean daily minimum °C (°F)	−3.7 (25.3)	−4.5 (23.9)	−0.4 (31.3)	4.4 (39.9)	8.7 (47.7)	13.0 (55.4)	16.9 (62.4)	16.6 (61.9)	12.8 (55.0)	7.6 (45.7)	2.2 (36.0)	−1.9 (28.6)	6.0 (42.8)
Average precipitation mm (inches)	103 (4.1)	117 (4.6)	119 (4.7)	122 (4.8)	74 (2.9)	18 (0.7)	4 (0.2)	3 (0.1)	10 (0.4)	71 (2.8)	104 (4.1)	108 (4.3)	853 (33.6)
Source: Climate-data.org

== Notable people ==
- Badh ibn Dustak (died 991), Kurdish tribal leader and Founder of the Marwanid Dynasty
- Xelîlê Sêrtî (1754–1843), Kurdish mullah and author most known for his contributions to the Kurdish madrasas.
- Said Nursî (1877–1960), Sunni-Muslim Kurdish theologian
- Kâmran İnan (1929–2015), Politician
- Suat Kaya (1999*), Footballer
