= Kömürlü, Adilcevaz =

Village in Turkey

Kömürlü
- Village
- Location in Turkey
- Coordinates: 38°56′43″N 43°0′14″E
- Country: Turkey
- Province: Bitlis
- District: Adilcevaz
- Population (2021): 472
- Time zone: UTC+3 (TRT)

Kömürlü is a village in the Adilcevaz District of Bitlis Province in Turkey. The village is populated by Kurds and had a population of 472 in 2022.

It formerly had an Armenian population.
