= Örentaş, Adilcevaz =

Village in Turkey

Örentaş
- Village
- Location in Turkey
- Coordinates: 39°0′17″N 42°58′14″E
- Country: Turkey
- Province: Bitlis
- District: Adilcevaz
- Population (2021): 138
- Time zone: UTC+3 (TRT)

Örentaş (Kurdish: Xirbesor) is a village in the Adilcevaz District of Bitlis Province in Turkey. The village is populated by Kurds and had a population of 138 in 2022.

It formerly had an Armenian population.
