= Karşıyaka, Adilcevaz =

Village in Turkey

Karşıyaka
- Village
- Location in Turkey
- Coordinates: 38.807°N 42.957°E
- Country: Turkey
- Province: Bitlis
- District: Adilcevaz
- Population (2021): 651
- Time zone: UTC+3 (TRT)

Karşıyaka (Kurdish: Hornas) is a village in the Adilcevaz District of Bitlis Province in Turkey. The village is populated by Kurds of the Bekiran tribe and had a population of 651 in 2021.
