= Mutki =

- Municipality
- Location within Turkey
- Coordinates: 38°24′33″N 41°55′19″E
- Country: Turkey
- Province: Bitlis
- District: Mutki

Government
  - Mayor: Vahdettin Barlak (AKP)
- Elevation: 2,017 m (6,617 ft)
- Population (2021): 2,294
- Time zone: UTC+3 (TRT)
- Postal code: 13700
- Website: www.mutki.bel.tr

Mutki (Kurdish: Motkî, Armenian: Մոտկան, romanized: Motkan) is a town in Bitlis Province, Turkey. It is the seat of Mutki District. Its population is 2,294 (2021). The town is populated by Kurds. The current mayor is Vahdettin Barlak (AKP).

== Demographics ==
On the eve of the First World War, the kaza of Mutki had more than 70 settlements, with mixed Armenian–Kurdish populations. According to the Armenian Patriarchate of Constantinople, in 1914 there were 5,469 Armenians in 27 settlements of the kaza, with 26 churches, four monasteries, and one school.

Mother tongue, Mutki District, 1927 Turkish census
Turkish	Arabic	Kurdish	Circassian	Armenian	Unknown or other languages
211	250	10,138	–	272	54

Religion, Mutki District, 1927 Turkish census
Muslim	Armenian	Jewish	Other Christian
10,651	–	–	1

The city is home to many crypto-Armenians. They formed the Mutki Armenians Solidarity Association (Mutki Ermenileri Sosyal Yardımlaşma ve Dayanışma Kültür Derneği).

== Notable people ==
- Zaro Aga, longest living Kurdish man (disputed)

== Sources ==
- Toroslar, Ferman (2013). Sürgün: isyan ateşinden geçen Mutkili bir Ermeni aile: anı. Aras (in Turkish). İstanbul: Aras. ISBN 978-605-5753-37-5.
