= Üzümveren, Güroymak =

Village in Turkey

Üzümveren
- Village
- Location in Turkey
- Coordinates: 38°33′57″N 42°00′18″E
- Country: Turkey
- Province: Bitlis
- District: Güroymak
- Population (2021): 103
- Time zone: UTC+3 (TRT)

Üzümveren is a village in the Güroymak District of Bitlis Province in Turkey. Its population is 103 (2021).
