= Adilcevaz =

- Municipality
- Location in Turkey
- Coordinates: 38°48′21″N 42°44′49″E
- Country: Turkey
- Province: Bitlis
- District: Adilcevaz

Government
  - Mayor: Abdullah Akbaba (AKP)
- Elevation: 1,650 m (5,410 ft)
- Population (2023): 15,059
- Time zone: UTC+3 (TRT)
- Postal code: 13500
- Website: www.adilcevaz.bel.tr

Adilcevaz (Turkish pronunciation: [aːdildʒevaz]; Armenian: Արծկէ, romanized: Artskē, Kurdish: Elcewaz) is a town in Bitlis Province of Turkey. It is on the northern shore of Lake Van. It is the seat of Adilcevaz District.

The mayor is Abdullah Akbaba from the AKP, elected in the 31 May 2024 local elections.

The famous Kef castle built by the Urarteans lies near Adilcevaz. Monastery of the Miracles is 2.18 miles northwest of Adilcevaz in the hills to the north of Lake Van.

== History ==
The medieval town of Adilcevaz, under the Abbasid Caliphate and then the Seljuk Empire, was located on and around the steep hill by the lake. Some fragments of the town walls from this period are still visible. An inscription naming the 15th-century Qara Qoyunlu ruler Jahan Shah was made by the old city's west gate, but he is "unlikely to have contributed much to the walls" - they were probably built before the Seljuks and then renovated c. 1231-43 during Seljuk rule. A small mosque from perhaps the 14th or 15th century is the only building that still stands in this area. There was also a suburban area beyond the walls, mostly to the south - which is now underwater. One inhabited area was apparently left isolated as rising water levels turned it into an island at some point.

During the late middle ages, water levels rose again, and the suburban areas to the south were abandoned in favor of the flat land around the area where the Ottoman-era Ulu Cami was later built. Probably by the late 16th century, when the Ottoman mosque was built, the southern island had also been submerged. The old walled area was "no longer viable as a town center", although there were still some houses here. Most likely, the nine-domed Ottoman mosque was built to reflect the town's shift rather than to encourage it; most of the suburbs had probably already relocated before its construction. Another monument from about the same time is the now-mostly-ruined han in the nearby village of Kohoz (officially Yolçatı). The han is locally attributed to Zal Paşa (d. 1580), who was sanjak-bey of Adilcevaz at the time of Süleyman I's campaign against the Safavids in 1548-9, but there is no other archaeological or textual evidence to validate this.

In recent centuries, Adilcevaz has shifted again, this time from the old Ottoman town center to its present-day location 1 km further east. An earthquake in the late 1800s caused flooding that destroyed many houses by the lake shore, which probably contributed to this second shift. An account in 1879 noted that the small older mosque was no longer being used as a place of worship; it was then used for grain storage. It has since been heavily restored.

In 1979, T.A. Sinclair wrote that there were "only bad hotels in Adilcevaz".
