= Bahçedere, Adilcevaz =

Village in Turkey

Bahçedere
- Village
- Location in Turkey
- Coordinates: 38°48′5″N 42°38′15″E
- Country: Turkey
- Province: Bitlis
- District: Adilcevaz
- Population (2021): 1,072
- Time zone: UTC+3 (TRT)

Bahçedere is a village in the Adilcevaz District of Bitlis Province in Turkey. Its population is 1,072 (2021).

== History ==
Bahçedere was described as a large village with 30 households, populated by both Kurds and Turks, in 1936. The village was again described as a village populated by both Kurds and Turks in 1944 by Feyzi Kalfagil. In the 1980s, many villagers moved to Germiyan in İzmir Province.
