= Heybeli, Adilcevaz =

Village in Turkey

Heybeli
- Village
- Location in Turkey
- Coordinates: 38.948°N 43.042°E
- Country: Turkey
- Province: Bitlis
- District: Adilcevaz
- Population (2021): 815
- Time zone: UTC+3 (TRT)

Heybeli (Kurdish: Nurşîn) is a village in the Adilcevaz District of Bitlis Province in Turkey. The village is populated by Kurds of the Bekiran tribe and had a population of 815 in 2021.
