= Aydınlar, Adilcevaz =

Aydınlar
- Municipality
- Location in Turkey
- Coordinates: 38°53′23″N 42°56′18″E
- Country: Turkey
- Province: Bitlis
- District: Adilcevaz
- Population (2021): 2,053
- Time zone: UTC+3 (TRT)

Aydınlar (Kurdish: Kazoxa, Armenian: Գանձակ, romanized: Gandzak) is a town (belde) in Adilcevaz District, Bitlis Province, Turkey. The town is populated by Kurds of the Mamxuran tribe and had a population of 2,053 in 2021.

The town is divided into the neighborhoods of Atatürk, Budaklı (Pêto), Esentepe, Gültepe, İsmetpaşa, Kışıklı (Qişqilî) and Menderes.
