= Güroymak =

- Municipality
- Location in Turkey
- Coordinates: 38°34′37″N 42°1′16″E
- Country: Turkey
- Province: Bitlis
- District: Güroymak

Government
  - Mayor: Hikmet Taşdemir (HDP)
- Elevation: 1,320 m (4,330 ft)
- Population (2021): 25,724
- Time zone: UTC+3 (TRT)
- Website: www.guroymak.bel.tr

Güroymak (Kurdish: Norşîn, from Armenian: Նորշեն, Norshen) is a town in Bitlis Province, Turkey. It is the seat of Güroymak District. Its population is 25,724 (2021).

The town is populated by Kurds of the Bekiran tribe.
