= Gölbaşı, Güroymak =

Gölbaşı
- Municipality
- Location within Turkey
- Coordinates: 38°38′31″N 42°5′56″E
- Country: Turkey
- Province: Bitlis
- District: Güroymak
- Population (2021): 4,629
- Time zone: UTC+3 (TRT)

Gölbaşı (Kurdish: Îron) is a town (belde) in Güroymak District, Bitlis Province, Turkey. Its population is 4,629 (2021).
