= Günkırı =

- Municipality
- Location in Turkey
- Coordinates: 38°35′20″N 41°58′9″E
- Country: Turkey
- Province: Bitlis
- District: Güroymak
- Population (2021): 4,720
- Time zone: UTC+3 (TRT)

Günkırı (Armenian: Կոթնի, romanized: Kothni) is a town (belde) in Güroymak District, Bitlis Province, Turkey. Its population is 4,720 (2021).
