= Lake Nazik =

Lake in Turkey

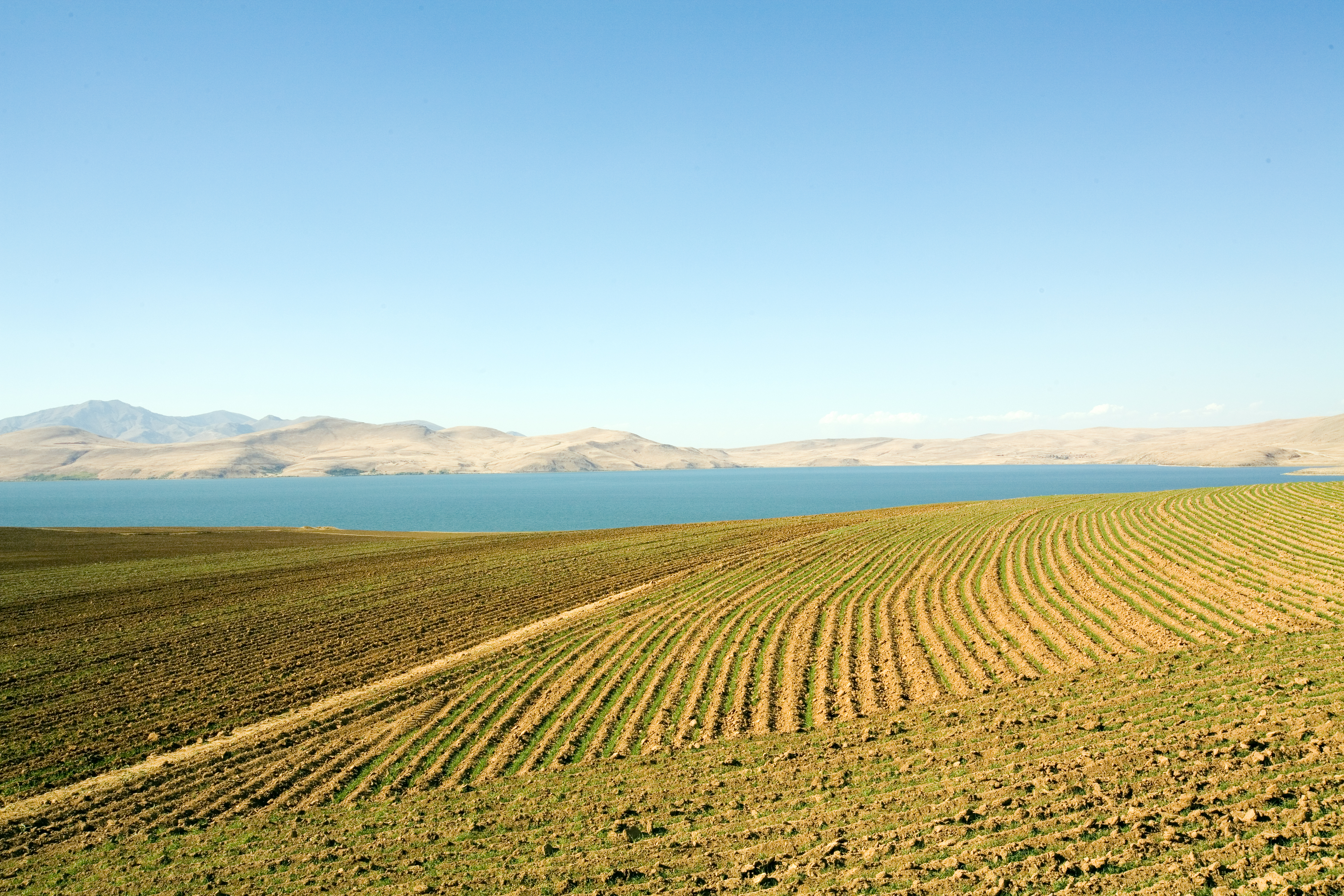
- The south-eastern shore of Lake Nazik

- Location within Turkey
- Location: Nazik, Ahlat, Bitlis Province
- Coordinates: 38.855547°N 42.286783°E
- Lake type: Volcanic dam, Freshwater
- Basin countries: Turkey
- Max. length: 11.5 km (7.1 mi)
- Max. width: 7 km (4.3 mi)
- Surface area: 44.5 km^{2} (17.2 sq mi)
- Average depth: 40–50 m (130–160 ft)
- Max. depth: 50 m (160 ft)
- Surface elevation: 1,816 m (5,958 ft)

Lake Nazik (Turkish: Nazik; Armenian: Նազիկ, Kurdish: Gola Nazikê) is a freshwater lake in the Ahlat district, Bitlis Province, eastern part of Turkey. It is close to Lake Van. Lake Nazik has maximum depth of about 50 m.

== Geology and geomorphology ==
It is estimated that Nazik Lake was formed when lava flows from the Bilican Mountains blocked the valley where the lake settled.

== See also ==
- Lake Haçlı
