= Ahlat District =

District of Bitlis Province, Turkey

- District
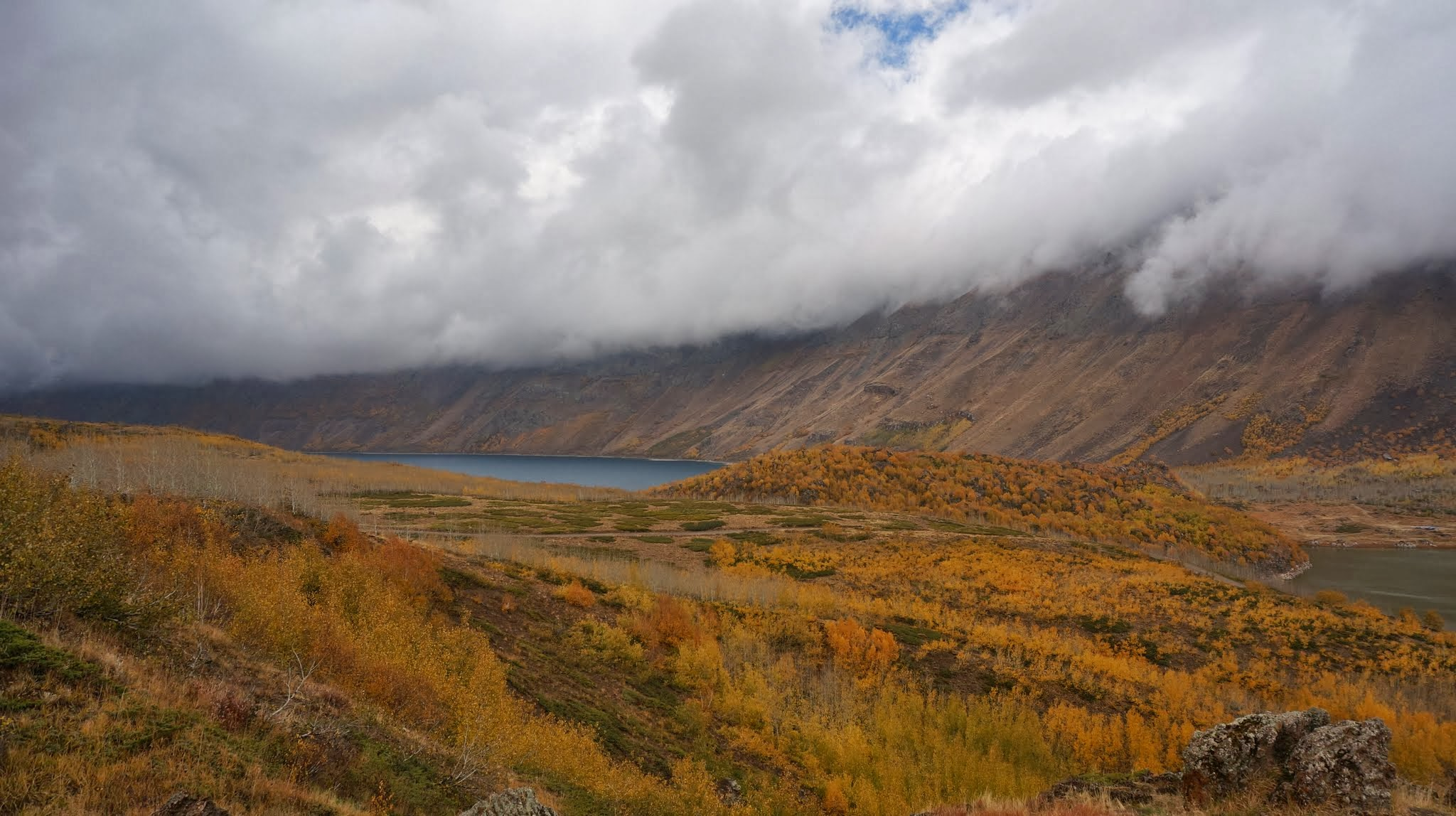

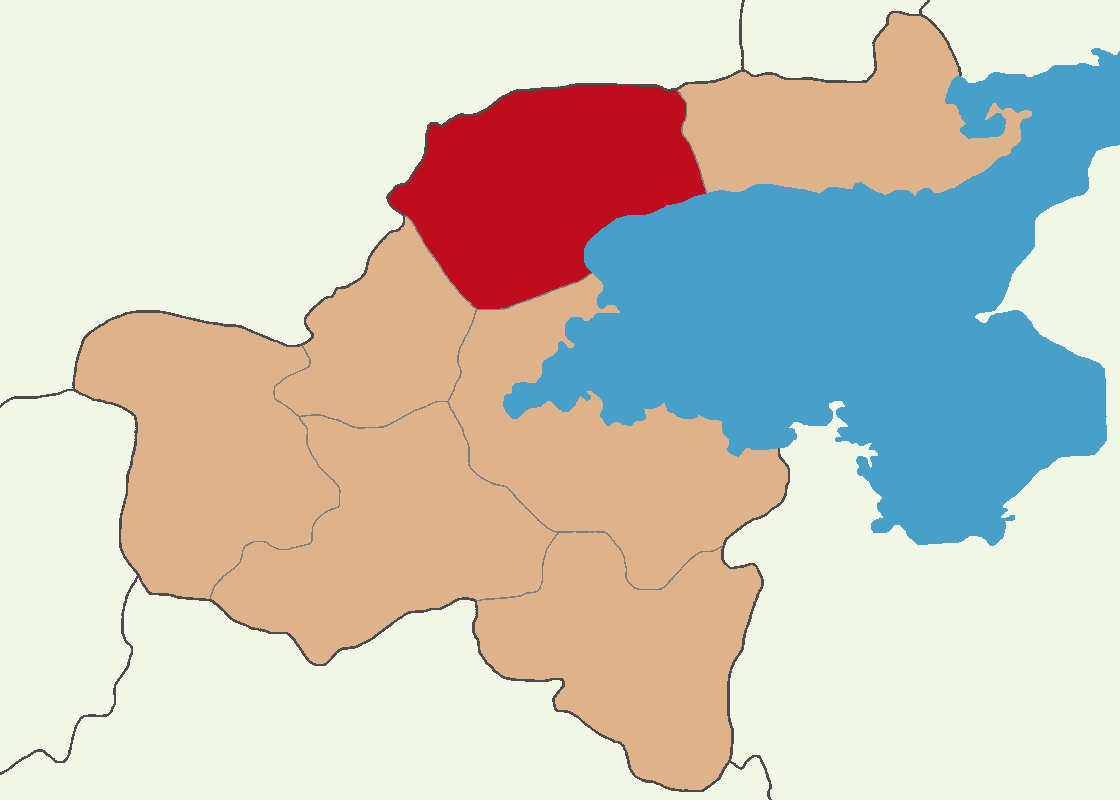
- Map showing Ahlat District in Bitlis Province

- Location within Turkey
- Coordinates: 38°45′N 42°30′E
- Country: Turkey
- Province: Bitlis
- Seat: Ahlat

Government
  - Kaymakam: Fikret Dağ
- Area: 1,153 km^{2} (445 sq mi)
- Population (2021): 42,131
  - Density: 36.54/km^{2} (94.64/sq mi)
- Time zone: UTC+3 (TRT)
- Website: www.ahlat.gov.tr

Ahlat District is a district of Bitlis Province of Turkey. Its seat is the town of Ahlat. Its area is 1,153 km^{2}, and its population is 42,131 (2021). From 1929 to 1936, it was a district of Van Province.

== Tourism ==
The touristic places in Ahlat district are Ahlat Seljuk Cemetery, Ahlat Museum and Lake Nemrut.

== Composition ==
There are two municipalities in Ahlat District:

- Ahlat
- Ovakışla

There are 26 villages in Ahlat District:

- Akçaören
- Alakır
- Bahçe
- Burcukaya
- Çatalağzı
- Cemalettinköy
- Çukurtarla
- Develik
- Dilburnu
- Gölgören
- Güzelsu
- Kınalıkoç
- Kırıkkaya
- Kırkdönüm
- Kuşhane
- Nazik
- Otluyazı
- Sakaköy
- Serinbayır
- Seyrantepe
- Soğanlı
- Taşharman
- Uludere
- Yeniköprü
- Yoğurtyemez
- Yuvadamı
