= Yeniköprü, Ahlat =

Village in Turkey

Yeniköprü
- Village
- Location in Turkey
- Coordinates: 38°43′48″N 42°24′59″E
- Country: Turkey
- Province: Bitlis
- District: Ahlat
- Population (2021): 974
- Time zone: UTC+3 (TRT)

Yeniköprü, formerly Karmunj, is a village in the Ahlat District of Bitlis Province in Turkey. The village is populated by Kurds and had a population of 974 in 2021.
