= Kuşhane, Ahlat =

Village in Turkey

Kuşhane
- Village
- Location in Turkey
- Coordinates: 38°50′6″N 42°35′49″E
- Country: Turkey
- Province: Bitlis
- District: Ahlat
- Population (2021): 210
- Time zone: UTC+3 (TRT)

Kuşhane is a village in the Ahlat District of Bitlis Province in Turkey. The village is populated by Kurds of the Bekiran tribe and had a population of 210 in 2021.
