= Dilburnu, Ahlat =

Village in Turkey

Dilburnu
- Village
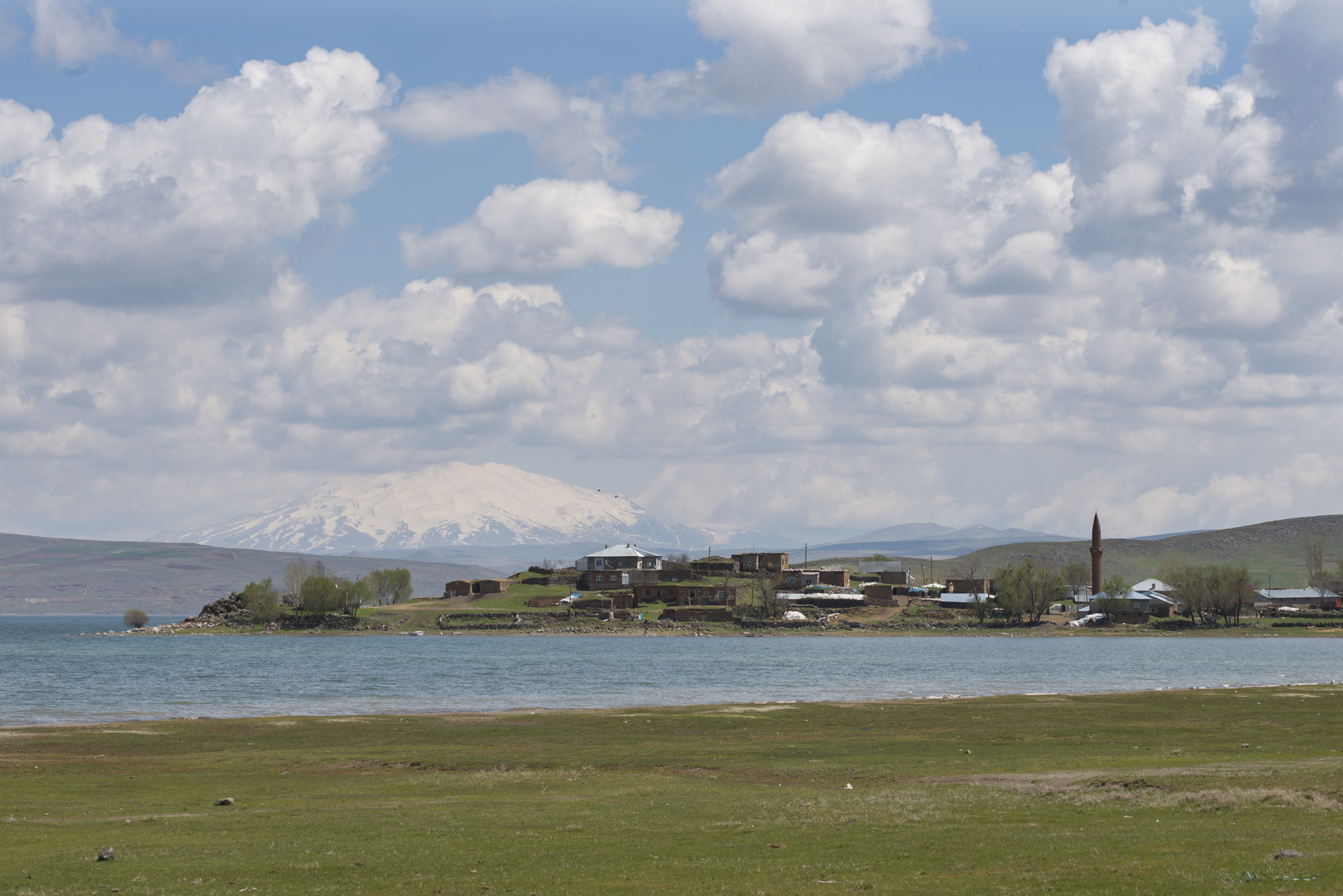

- Location within Turkey
- Coordinates: 38°50′14″N 42°15′48″E
- Country: Turkey
- Province: Bitlis
- District: Ahlat
- Population (2021): 368
- Time zone: UTC+3 (TRT)

Dilburnu (Kurdish: Cizirok) is a village in the Ahlat District of Bitlis Province in Turkey. The village is populated by Kurds of the Celalî tribe and had a population of 368 in 2021.
