= Celalettin =

Celalettin is a Turkish masculine given name.

== List of people with the name ==
- Celalettin Arif (1875–1928), Turkish politician
- Celalettin Güvenç (born 1959), Turkish politician
- Celalettin Muhtar Ozden (1865–1947), Turkish dermatologist
- Mustafa Celalettin Pasha (1826–1876), Ottoman-Polish strategist, writer, and military official

== See also ==
- Cemalettinköy, Ahlat
