= Yuvadamı, Ahlat =

Village in Turkey

Yuvadamı
- Village
- Location in Turkey
- Coordinates: 38°50′N 42°29′E
- Country: Turkey
- Province: Bitlis
- District: Ahlat
- Population (2021): 295
- Time zone: UTC+3 (TRT)

Yuvadamı (Kurdish: Hersong) is a village in the Ahlat District of Bitlis Province in Turkey. The village is populated by Kurds of the Bekiran and Mamxuran tribes and had a population of 295 in 2021.
