= Güzelsu =

Güzelsu (literally "beautiful water") is a Turkish place name that may refer to the following places in Turkey:

- Güzelsu, Ahlat, a village
- Güzelsu, Akseki, a village in the district of Akseki, Antalya Province
- Güzelsu, Gerger, a village in the district of Gerger, Adıyaman Province
- Güzelsu, Gürpınar, a neighborhood in Gürpınar (District), Van province
- Güzelsu, Nusaybin
- Güzelsu, Oltu
