= Otluyazı, Ahlat =

Village in Turkey

Otluyazı
- Village
- Location in Turkey
- Coordinates: 38°54′32″N 42°25′39″E
- Country: Turkey
- Province: Bitlis
- District: Ahlat
- Population (2021): 729
- Time zone: UTC+3 (TRT)

Otluyazı (Kurdish: Hulik) is a village in the Ahlat District of Bitlis Province, Turkey. The village is populated by Kurds, Ossetians, and Karapapakhs and had a population of 729 in 2021.
