= Sose Mayrig =

Armenian revolutionary

- Sose Mayrig's Egyptian passport photo
- Born: Sose Vardanian; 1868; Teghood, Ahlat, Bitlis Ottoman Empire
- Died: 1953 (aged 84–85); Alexandria, Egypt
- Burial place: Yerablur
- Spouse: Aghbiur Serob
- Military career
- Allegiance: Dashnaktsutyun
- Service years: 1890s—1920
- Nicknames: Mayrig, Sose Mayrig
- Conflicts: Armenian National Liberation Movement; Sasun Uprising

Sose Mayrig (Armenian: Սօսէ Մայրիկ, 1868 – 1953), born Sose Vartanian, (Սօսէ Վարդանեան) was an Armenian female fedayee, the wife of the famous Aghbiur Serob. She was surnamed "mayrig" (mother) by Serop's hajduks for her bravery and maternal concern for Armenian youth.

She participated in the many fedayee battles. In 1898, after the battle of Babshen, Sose and Serop fled to Sassoun. In 1899, along with her son, Serop and his brothers, she participated in the battle against Kurdish brigands: Serop, their sons and Serop's brothers were killed while Sose Mayrig was wounded. After the Sasun uprising in 1904, she moved to Van and then to the Caucasus. Another son of Sose Mayrig and Serop was killed during the massacre in Erzerum. From 1920, Sose Mayrig lived in Constantinople, then in Alexandria (Egypt), where she died in 1953. Her remains were later moved to the Yerablur military cemetery in Yerevan.

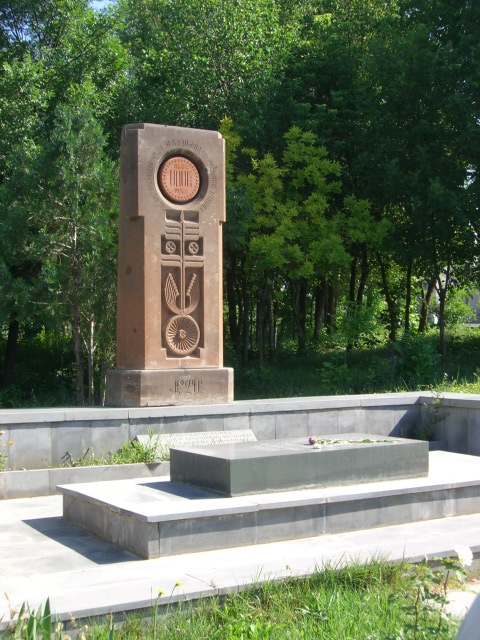
The tomb of Sose Mayrig in Armenia
