= Serinbayır, Ahlat =

Village in Turkey

Serinbayır
- Village
- Location in Turkey
- Coordinates: 38°40′5″N 42°18′15″E
- Country: Turkey
- Province: Bitlis
- District: Ahlat
- Population (2021): 287
- Time zone: UTC+3 (TRT)

Serinbayır (Kurdish: Saygut (Sixort) Armenian: Սոխորդ, romanized: Sokhord) is a village in the Ahlat District of Bitlis Province in Turkey. The village is populated by Kurds of the Elîkan tribe and had a population of 287 in 2021.

== Notable people ==
- Aghbiur Serob
