= Bahçe, Ahlat =

Village in Turkey

Bahçe
- Village
- Location in Turkey
- Coordinates: 38°46′30″N 42°5′41″E
- Country: Turkey
- Province: Bitlis
- District: Ahlat
- Population (2021): 102
- Time zone: UTC+3 (TRT)

Bahçe is a village in the Ahlat District of Bitlis Province in Turkey. The village is populated by Kurds of the Hevêdan tribe and had a population of 102 in 2021.
