= Aghbiur Serob =

Armenian fedayi leader

Aghpyur Serob
- Աղբիւր Սերոբ
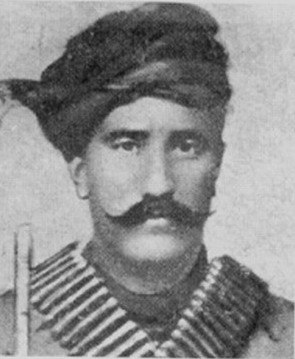
- Born: Serob Vardanian (Սերոբ Վարդանեան); 1864, November 5 Sokhord, Ahlat, Bitlis Vilayet, Ottoman Empire
- Died: 24 November 1899 (aged 34–35); Gelieguzan, Sasun, Bitlis Vilayet, Ottoman Empire
- Burial place: head in Surb Karmrak Church (Bitlis); body in Gelieguzan village
- Spouse(s): Sose Mayrig; 2 sons
- Military career
- Allegiance: Dashnaktsutyun
- Service years: 1891—1899
- Nickname: Serob Pasha
- Conflicts: Armenian National Liberation Movement

Serob Vardanian (also spelled Serop Vartanian, Armenian: Սերոբ Վարդանեան; 1864 – 24 November 1899), better known by his noms de guerre Aghbiur Serob (Աղբիւր Սերոբ) and Serob Pasha (Սերոբ Փաշա), was a famed Armenian military commander who organized a guerrilla network that fought against the Ottoman Empire during the latter part of the 19th century.

== Life as a revolutionary ==
Serop Pasha with Armenian fedayis in the late 1890s (standing, second from right)

Serob was born on November 5, 1864, in the village of Sokhord (modern-day Serinbayır, Ahlat) in the district of Ahlat in the Bitlis Vilayet of the Ottoman Empire. In 1891, he married Sose Mayrig, who was a female fedayi. Around the age of twenty, he got into a fight with two Kurds and ended up killing one of them. The murder forced him to flee to Constantinople. In 1892, he travelled to Romania and opened a coffee shop there, intending to use the shop as a meeting site for young revolutionaries. He eventually joined the Armenian Revolutionary Federation and returned to Ottoman Armenia, in Bitlis Vilayet, where he took up arms to defend the local Armenian population from Ottoman and Kurdish attackers.

In 1898, in the village of Babshen in Bitlis, a Kurdish expedition was sent by the Ottomans to capture and kill Serop. The Kurds began their offensive at 3:00 a.m., surrounding Serop and his fedayis. The battle continued until sunrise when Serop and his fedayis managed to escape. After the Battle of Babshen, Serop was given the title of "Pasha".

=== Aghpyur ===
It is also around this time he gained his pseudonym Aghpur, given to him by the Armenian population because he had the "heart of a lion" and was very courteous. The local Armenian population would often say "Veruh Asdvadz, Vahruh Serop" (literally "God is up there, Serop is down here"), which figuratively means "If God is protecting us from the sky, Serop is protecting us from the ground". As a general, he commanded such famed fedayees as Andranik Ozanian and Kevork Chavoush, among others.

== Death ==
On 1 November 1899, while meeting with several other compatriots, Aghbiur Serob had his pipe poisoned by a fellow Armenian known as "Avé" who had been bribed by Kurdish brigands. The Kurdish brigands, led by Khalil, surrounded the house with hundreds of fighters. A gunfight erupted between the Kurds and the Armenians, the latter having in its ranks twelve of Serob's personal guard, his wife Sose and their son, Hagop. The Kurds managed to defeat the outnumbered Armenians, killing in the process Serob, his son, and twelve of his men including the town priest. Sose was wounded and taken prisoner. Khalil severed Serob's head and placed it on a pike as a warning to all other Armenian freedom fighters.

A mission led by fellow Armenian guerrilla, Zoravar Andranik Ozanian, tracked the Kurds to the home of "Avé", who, along with the Kurds and his own family, was killed.

== Legacy ==
As leader of the Armenian fedayi, Serob made Sasoun almost completely independent. He was described as "one of the most outstanding Armenian revolutionaries" by Leon Trotsky.

== See also ==
- Armenian militia
- Armenian national movement
- List of Armenian national heroes
