= Taşharman, Ahlat =

Village in Turkey

Taşharman
- Village
- Location in Turkey
- Coordinates: 38°42′8″N 42°19′55″E
- Country: Turkey
- Province: Bitlis
- District: Ahlat
- Population (2021): 990
- Time zone: UTC+3 (TRT)

Taşharman (Kurdish: Teygut) is a village in the Ahlat District of Bitlis Province in Turkey. The village is populated by Kurds of the Elîkan tribe and had a population of 990 in 2021.
