= Burcukaya, Ahlat =

Village in Turkey

Burcukaya
- Village
- Location in Turkey
- Coordinates: 38°49′N 42°13′E
- Country: Turkey
- Province: Bitlis
- District: Ahlat
- Population (2021): 568
- Time zone: UTC+3 (TRT)

Burcukaya (Kurdish: Mesik) is a village in the Ahlat District of Bitlis Province in Turkey. The village is populated by Kurds of the Celalî tribe and had a population of 568 in 2021.
