= Yoğurtyemez, Ahlat =

Village in Turkey

Yoğurtyemez
- Village
- Location in Turkey
- Coordinates: 38°53′N 42°28′E
- Country: Turkey
- Province: Bitlis
- District: Ahlat
- Population (2021): 241
- Time zone: UTC+3 (TRT)

Yoğurtyemez is a village in the Ahlat District of Bitlis Province in Turkey. The village is populated by Kurds, and had a population of 241 in 2021. It formerly had a Shapsug Circassian population.
