= Akçaören, Ahlat =

Village in Turkey

Akçaören
- Village
- Location in Turkey
- Coordinates: 38°54′32″N 42°27′37″E
- Country: Turkey
- Province: Bitlis
- District: Ahlat
- Population (2021): 128
- Time zone: UTC+3 (TRT)

Akçaören (Kurdish: Axçewêran) is a village in the Ahlat District of Bitlis Province in Turkey. The village is populated by Kurds, and had a population of 128 in 2021. It formerly had a Circassian or Ossetian population.
