= Çukurtarla, Ahlat =

Village in Turkey

Çukurtarla
- Village
- Location in Turkey
- Coordinates: 38°55′8″N 42°32′38″E
- Country: Turkey
- Province: Bitlis
- District: Ahlat
- Population (2021): 91
- Time zone: UTC+3 (TRT)

Çukurtarla (Kurdish: Hanik) is a village in the Ahlat District of Bitlis Province in Turkey. The village is populated by Kurds, and had a population of 91 in 2021. It formerly had a Shapsug Circassian population.
