= Seyrantepe =

Seyrantepe can refer to:

- Seyrantepe Dam
- Seyrantepe (Istanbul Metro)
- Seyrantepe, Ahlat, a village
- Seyrantepe, Kozluk, a village
