= Kınalıkoç, Ahlat =

Village in Turkey

Kınalıkoç
- Village
- Location in Turkey
- Coordinates: 38°48′49″N 42°22′09″E
- Country: Turkey
- Province: Bitlis
- District: Ahlat
- Population (2021): 207
- Time zone: UTC+3 (TRT)

Kınalıkoç is a village in the Ahlat District of Bitlis Province in Turkey. Its population is 207 (2021).
