= Uludere (disambiguation) =

Uludere can refer to the following places in Turkey:

- Uludere, a town in Şırnak Province
- Uludere District, a district in Şırnak Province
- Uludere Dam, a dam in Şırnak Province
- Uludere, Ahlat, a village in Ahlat District, Bitlis Province
- Uludere, Refahiye, a village in Refahiye District, Erzincan Province
- Uludere, Tepebaşı, a neighbourhood in Tepebaşı District, Eskişehir Province
- Uludere, Terme, a neighbourhood in Terme District, Samsun Province
