= Kırkdönüm, Ahlat =

Village in Turkey

Kırkdönüm
- Village
- Location in Turkey
- Coordinates: 38°52′9″N 42°27′54″E
- Country: Turkey
- Province: Bitlis
- District: Ahlat
- Population (2021): 80
- Time zone: UTC+3 (TRT)

Kırkdönüm (Kurdish: Hasuk) is a village in the Ahlat District of Bitlis Province in Turkey. The village is populated by Kurds of the Bekiran tribe and had a population of 80 in 2021.
