= Kırıkkaya, Ahlat =

Village in Turkey

Kırıkkaya
- Village
- Location in Turkey
- Coordinates: 38°54′30″N 42°19′36″E
- Country: Turkey
- Province: Bitlis
- District: Ahlat
- Population (2021): 153
- Time zone: UTC+3 (TRT)

Kırıkkaya (Kurdish: Kers) is a village in the Ahlat District of Bitlis Province in Turkey. The village is populated by Kurds of the Bekiran tribe and had a population of 153 in 2021.
