= Ovakışla =

- Municipality
- Location in Turkey
- Coordinates: 38°49′23″N 42°19′32″E
- Country: Turkey
- Province: Bitlis
- District: Ahlat
- Population (2021): 4,142
- Time zone: UTC+3 (TRT)

Ovakışla, formerly Purhus, (Armenian: Prkhus, Kurdish: Pirxûs) is a town (belde) in Ahlat District, Bitlis Province, Turkey. The town is populated by Kurds and had a population of 4,142 in 2021.

It formerly had an Armenian population.
