= Seyrantepe, Ahlat =

Village in Turkey

Seyrantepe
- Village
- Country: Turkey
- Province: Bitlis
- District: Ahlat
- Population (2021): 229
- Time zone: UTC+3 (TRT)

Seyrantepe (Kurdish:Zaxgî) is a village in the Ahlat District of Bitlis Province in Turkey. Its population is 229 (2021).
