= Cemalettinköy, Ahlat =

Village in Turkey

Cemalettinköy
- Village
- Location in Turkey
- Coordinates: 38.826°N 42.522°E
- Country: Turkey
- Province: Bitlis
- District: Ahlat
- Population (2021): 463
- Time zone: UTC+3 (TRT)

Cemalettinköy is a village in the Ahlat District of Bitlis Province in Turkey. The village is populated by Kurds of the Elîkan tribe and had a population of 463 in 2021.
