= Uludere, Ahlat =

Village in Turkey

Uludere
- Village
- Location in Turkey
- Coordinates: 38.773°N 42.539°E
- Country: Turkey
- Province: Bitlis
- District: Ahlat
- Population (2021): 521
- Time zone: UTC+3 (TRT)

Uludere (Kurdish: Sor) is a village in the Ahlat District of Bitlis Province in Turkey. The village is populated by Kurds of the Elîkan tribe and had a population of 421 in 2021.

== Geography ==
The village is 71 km away from Bitlis city center and 6 km away from Ahlat town center. The village is in the northeast of Ahlat,D is connected to the Ağrı- Bitlis (Adilcevaz-Ahlat) state/international road and Lake Van by a 1.7 km village road.
