= Lake Arin =

Lake in Turkey

- Arin Lake
- Arin Gölü (Turkish)
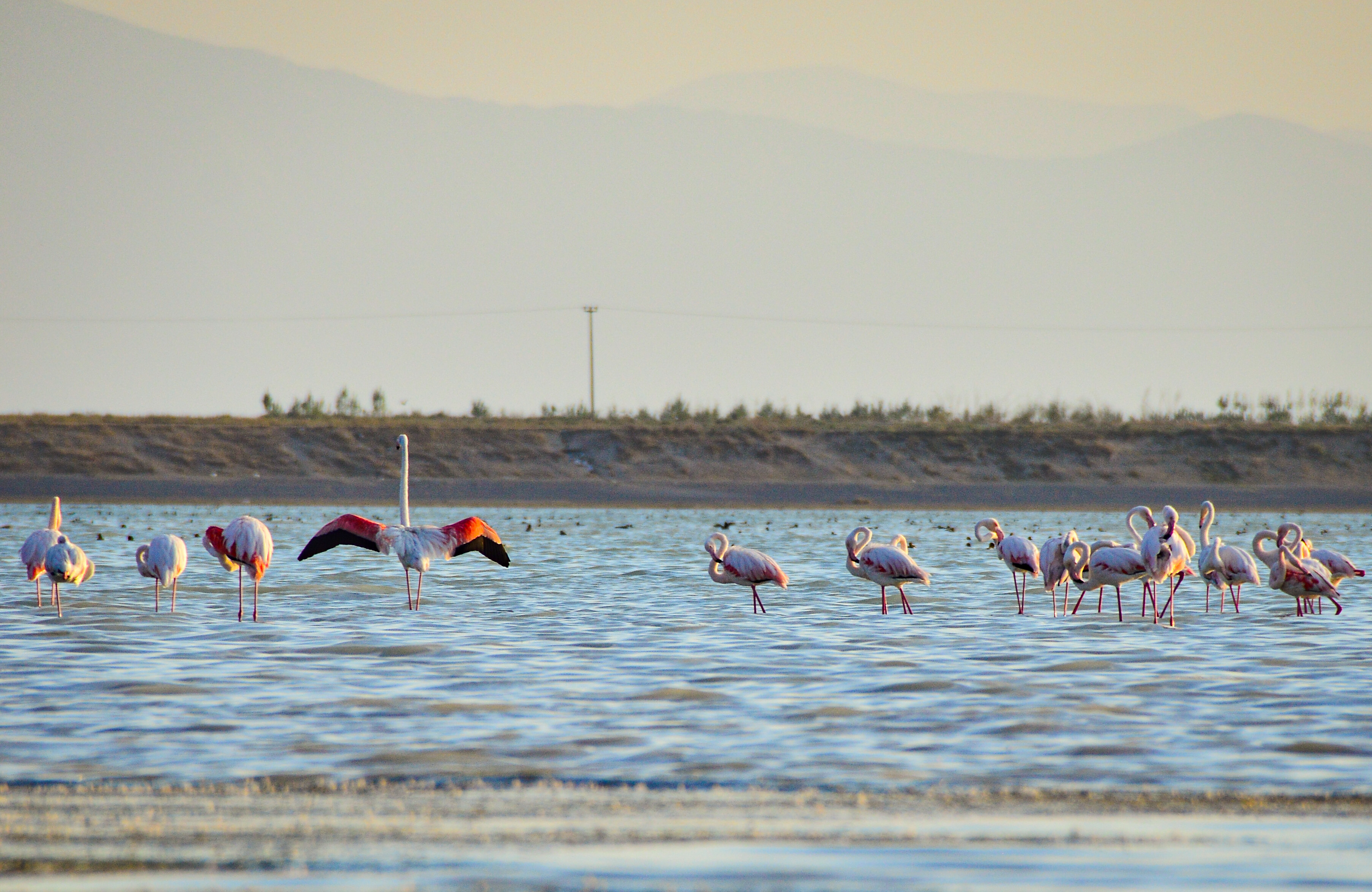

- Location of Lake Arin in Turkey.
- Location: Adilcevaz, Bitlis Province, East Turkey
- Coordinates: 38°48′35″N 42°59′20″E
- Lake type: soda lake
- Basin countries: Turkey
- Max. length: 5 km (3.1 mi)
- Max. width: 3.33 km (2.07 mi)
- Surface area: 12 km^{2} (4.6 sq mi)
- Surface elevation: 1,650 m (5,410 ft)
- Settlements: villages of Karşıyaka, Göldüzü

Lake Arin (in Turkish: Arin Gölü; also Sodalı Göl Armenian: Արին լիճը, Kurdish: Gola Arîn) is a soda lake in Adilcevaz district of Bitlis, Turkey. The lake is to the east of Adilcevaz and separated from Lake Van, the biggest lake of Turkey by alluvial deposits of only 1 kilometre (0.62 mi) width.

The mid point of the lake is at 38°48′35″N 42°59′20″E. The area of the lake is about 13 square kilometres (5.0 sq mi). Gadwall, red-crested pochard and ruddy duck are among the birds of the lake.
