= Güzelsu, Ahlat =

Village in Turkey

Güzelsu
- Village
- Location in Turkey
- Coordinates: 38°45′31″N 42°11′30″E
- Country: Turkey
- Province: Bitlis
- District: Ahlat
- Population (2021): 1,851
- Time zone: UTC+3 (TRT)

Güzelsu (Kurdish: Tepevank) is a village in the Ahlat District of Bitlis Province in Turkey. The village is populated by Kurds of the Celalî and Hevêdan tribes and had a population of 1,851 in 2021.
