= Governor of Bitlis =

Governor of a Turkish Province

Governor of Bitlis Bitlis Valiliği
- Logo of the Governor of Bitlis
- Incumbent; Ahmet Karakaya since September 26, 2024
- Appointer: President of Turkey On the recommendation of the Turkish government
- Term length: No set term length or limit
- Inaugural holder: Mehmet Hüsnü Zadıl; 1913
- Website: Office of the Governor

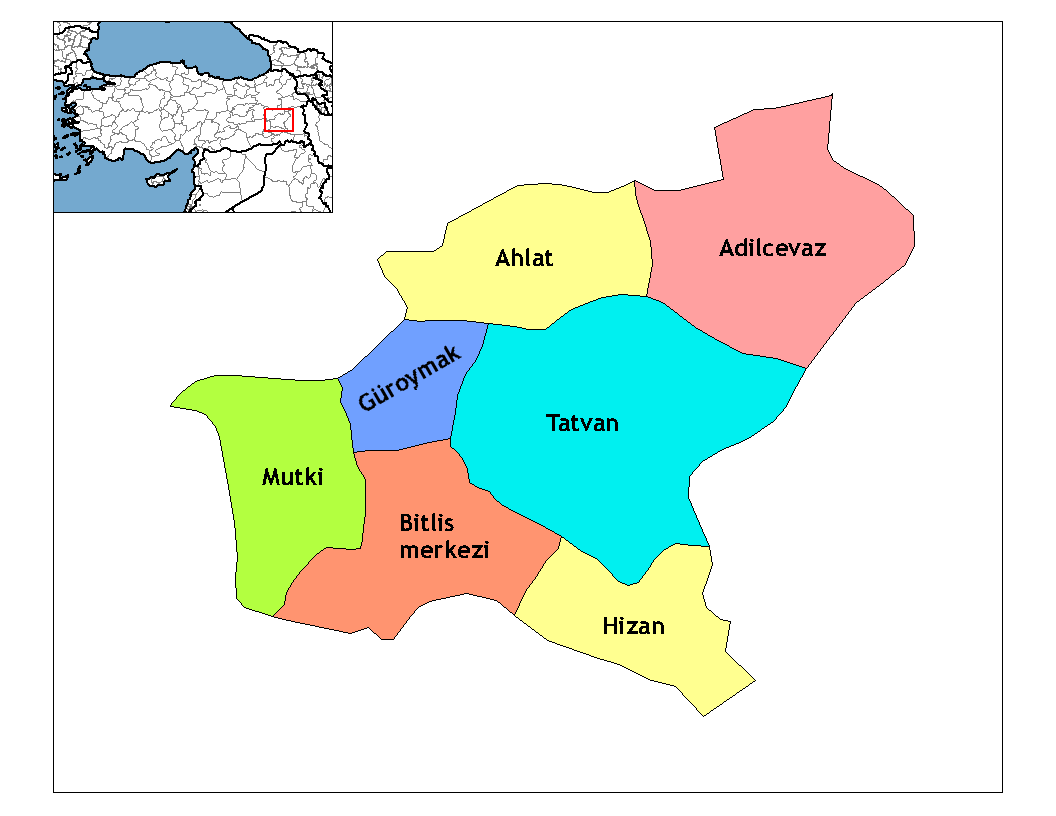
Map of the Province of Bitlis, showing the provincial districts.

The Governor of Bitlis (Turkish: Bitlis Valiliği) is responsible for the implementation of government legislation within Bitlis Province, Turkey. The governorship is a civil service office appointed by the government of Turkey. The Governor is also the most senior commander of both the Bitlis provincial police force and the Bitlis Gendarmerie.

== Appointment ==
The Governor of Bitlis is appointed by the President of Turkey, who confirms the appointment after recommendation from the Turkish Government. The Ministry of the Interior first considers and puts forward possible candidates for approval by the cabinet. The Governor of Bitlis is therefore not a directly elected position and instead functions as the most senior civil servant in the province of Bitlis.

=== Term limits ===
The Governor is not limited by any term limits and does not serve for a set length of time. Instead, the Governor serves at the pleasure of the Government, which can appoint or reposition the Governor whenever it sees fit. Such decisions are again made by the cabinet of Turkey. The Governor of Bitlis, as a civil servant, may not have any close connections or prior experience in Bitlis Province. It is not unusual for Governors to alternate between several different Provinces during their bureaucratic career.

== Functions ==
The Governor of Bitlis has both bureaucratic functions and influence over local government. The main role of the Governor is to oversee the implementation of decisions by government ministries, constitutional requirements and legislation passed by Grand National Assembly within the provincial borders. The Governor also has the power to reassign, remove or appoint officials a certain number of public offices and has the right to alter the role of certain public institutions if they see fit. Governors are also the most senior public official within the Province, meaning that they preside over any public ceremonies or provincial celebrations being held due to a national holiday. As the commander of the provincial police and Gendarmerie forces, the Governor can also take decisions designed to limit civil disobedience and preserve public order. Although mayors of municipalities and councillors are elected during local elections, the Governor has the right to re-organise or to inspect the proceedings of local government despite being an unelected position.

== List of governors of Bitlis ==
- Mehmet Hüsnü Zadıl (1913)
- Mehmet Ali Ayni (1913)
- Mustafa Abdülhalik Renda (1913–1919)
- Ahmet Reşit Paşa (1918–1919)
- Mazhar Müfit Kansu (1919–1921)
- Süleyman Sami Kepenek (1921–1922)
- Zihni Orhon (1922–1924)
- Kâzım Dirik (1924–1926)
- Halit Bey (1926)
- Fahri Bey (1926)
- Zeynel Abidin Özmen (1927–1936)
- H.Fehmi Süerdem (1936–1937)
- Mehmet Rıfat Şahinbaş (1938–1939)
- Sedat Aziz Erim (1939–1942)
- Hulusi Devrimler (1940–1942)
- Asım Türeli (1943–1945)
- Ali Sakıp Beygo (1945–1947)
- Seracettin Saraç (1947)
- Cahit Ortaç (1947)
- İhsan Kahyaoğlu (1947–1950)
- Mehmet Nazım Üner (1950)
- Hıfzı Tüz (1950–1951)
- Nadir Tüzün (1951–1955)
- Niyazi Toker (1955)
- Necmettin Kuteş (1955–1957)
- Rıfat Bingöl (1957–1957)
- Ruhi Çalışlar (1957–1959)
- Mehmet Muhsin Gökkaya (1959–1960)
- Vefa Poyraz (1960–1961)
- Nurettin Hazar (1961–1962)
- Nusret Budunç (1962–1964)
- Abdullah Asım İğneciler (1964–1966)
- Celal Turgut Güvenç (1966–1968)
- Nail Memik (1968–1970)
- Cemal Orhan Mirkelam (1970–1972)
- Mehmet Emin Dündar (1972–1975)
- Ahmet Fuat Çapanoğlu (1975–1977)
- Erol Zihni Gürsoy (1978–1979)
- Ertan Yaramanoğlu (1979–1981)
- Yılmaz Ergun (1981–1984)
- Mehmet Us (1984–1986)
- Mustafa Yıldırım (1986–1988)
- Şükrü Ergün Özakman (1988–1989)
- Ali Sakallı (1989–1990)
- Aydın Güçlü (1990–1991)
- Yener Rakıcıoğlu (1991–1992)
- Fethi Tunç (1992–1993)
- Osman Badraslı (1993–1995)
- Kemal Esensoy (1995–1995)
- Şükrü Kocatepe (1995–1997)
- Kemalettin M. Köksal (1997–2000)
- Uğur Boran (2000–2003)
- Mehmet Asım Hacımustafaoğlu (2003–2006)
- Mevlüt Atbaş (2006–2008)
- Nurettin Yılmaz (2008–2012)
- Veysel Yurdakul (2012–2014)
- Orhan Öztürk (2014–2015)
- Ahmet Çınar (2015–2017)
- Ismail Ustaoğlu (2017–2018)
- Oktay Çağatay (2018–2023)
- Erol Karaömeroğlu (2023–2024)
- Ahmet Karakaya (2024–)

== See also ==
- Governor (Turkey)
- Bitlis Province
- Ministry of the Interior (Turkey)
