= Nazik, Ahlat =

Village in Turkey

Nazik
- Village
- Location in Turkey
- Coordinates: 38°51′34″N 42°12′3″E
- Country: Turkey
- Province: Bitlis
- District: Ahlat
- Population (2021): 242
- Time zone: UTC+3 (TRT)

Nazik is a village in the Ahlat District of Bitlis Province in Turkey. The village is populated by Kurds of the Celalî tribe and had a population of 242 in 2021.
