= Lake Nemrut =

Freshwater crater lake in Bitlis Province, eastern Turkey

- Nemrut Caldera (Nemrut Kalderası)
- Nemrut Gölü (Turkish)
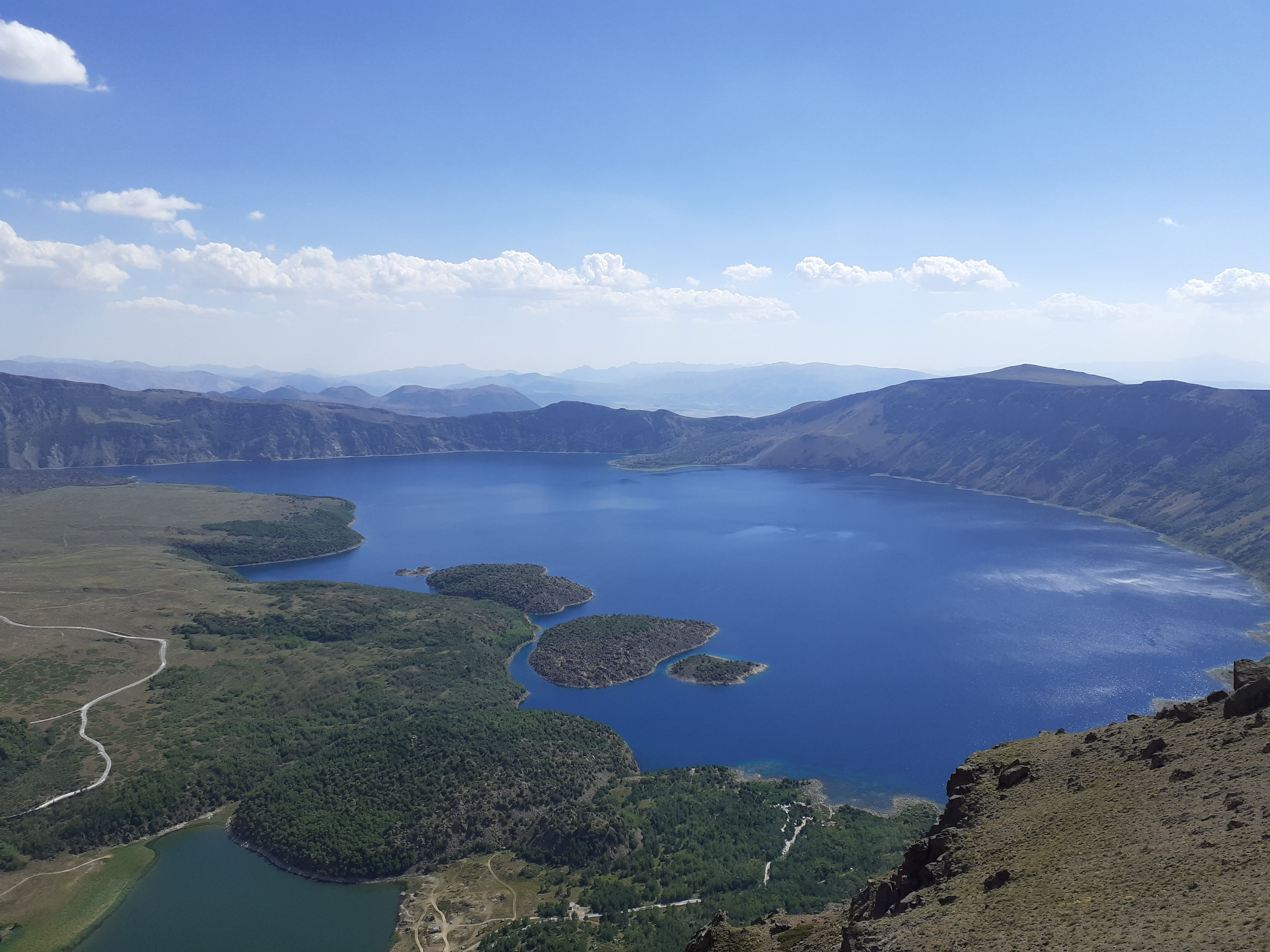
- The lake viewed from the caldera rim

- Location of Lake Nemrut in Turkey.
- Location: Tatvan, Bitlis Province, Turkey
- Coordinates: 38°38′16″N 42°14′19″E
- Lake type: Crater
- Basin countries: Turkey
- Max. length: 4.9 km (3.0 mi)
- Max. width: 2.1 km (1.3 mi)
- Surface area: 12.36 km^{2} (4.77 sq mi)
- Average depth: 140 m (460 ft)
- Max. depth: 176 m (577 ft)
- Water volume: 1.73 km^{3} (0.42 cu mi)
- Surface elevation: 2,247 m (7,372 ft)

Ramsar Wetland
- Official name: Nemrut Caldera
- Designated: 17 April 2013
- Reference no.: 2145

Lake Nemrut (Turkish: Nemrut Gölü; Armenian: Նեմրութ, Kurdish: Gola Nemrûdê) is a freshwater crater lake in Bitlis Province, eastern Turkey. It is part of Nemrut Caldera (Turkish: Nemrut Kalderası), a volcanic caldera atop Volcano Nemrut.

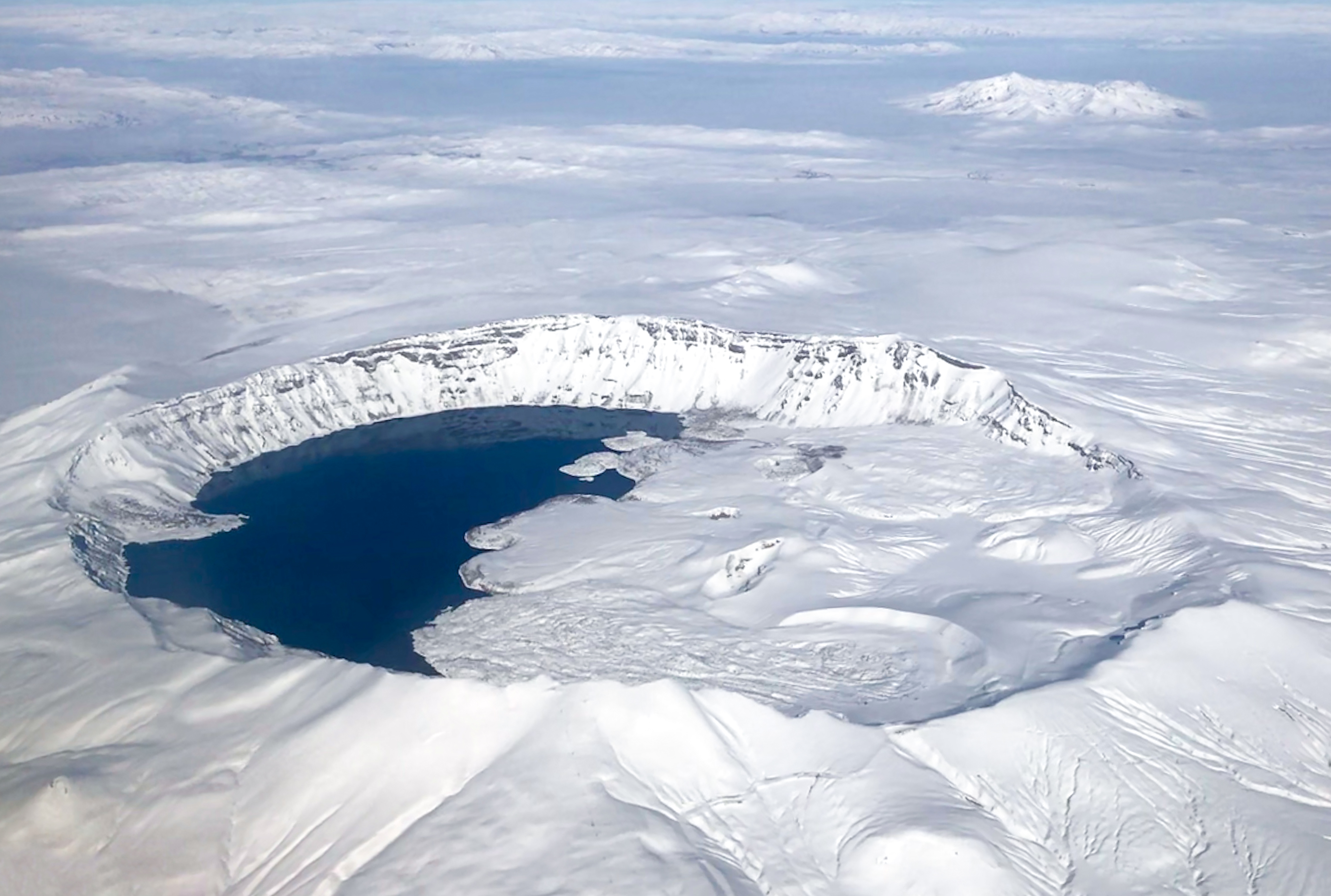
View of Lake Nemrut from the air. Bilican Mountains are also visible in the background.

The government of Turkey has named as its 14th Wetland of International Importance the Nemrut Caldera (4,589 hectares). With its structural morphology that is unique in Turkey, the site qualifies for the Ramsar List under Criterion 1 on "representative, rare, or unique examples of a natural or near-natural wetland type found within the appropriate biogeographic region".

== Caldera ==
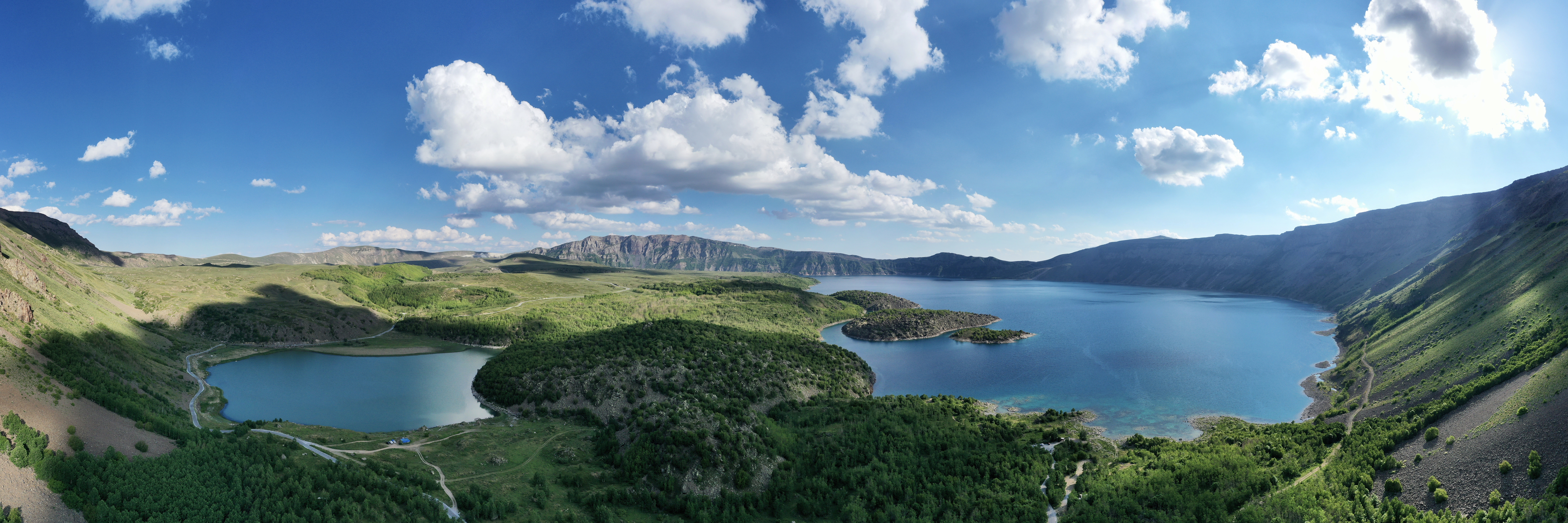
The crater of Volcano Nemrut.

The caldera is located west of Lake Van in the Tatvan, Ahlat and Güroymak districts of Bitlis Province. It is named after the biblical figure King Nimrod. The caldera is 13 km (8.1 mi) far from Tatvan, and 25 km (16 mi) from Ahlat. With its width of nearly 10 km (6.2 mi), the crater of Nemrut Volcano is one of the largest calderas of the world. The western half of the crater is covered by the lake. At the summit, there are five lakes, two of them existing permanently and the others seasonal. The biggest of the lakes is Lake Nemrut in the form of crescent. It contains freshwater of colorless, odorless and drink water quality.

Lake Nemrut is situated at an elevation of about 2,247 m (7,372 ft) above main sea level. It has an area of 12.36 km^{2} (4.77 sq mi), and its average depth is about 100 m (330 ft) with a maximum depth of 176 m (577 ft).

Nemrut Caldera is on the youngest volcanic cone in Turkey, which is in a non-eroded state. This unique structural geomorphology make it a subject of scientific research.

== Biota ==
=== Flora ===
About 450 plant species were recorded in and around Nemrut Caldera, around 200 (44%) of them belonging to the region. The diversity of the flora points out to the variation of climate conditions in the past. Around 38 (8.4%) of the existing plant species are endemic. The upside down tulip, which grows here, is a world-famous flower. The climax vegetation of Nemrut Caldera forms the haired birch (Betula) and the trembling aspen (Populus tremula). Other notable plants growing around two lakes of the caldera are the trees dwarf juniper (Juniperus communis), Norway maple (Acer platanoides), European mountain ash (Aria edulis), common buckthorn (Rhamnus cathartica), sessile oak (Quercus petraea), pedunculate oak (Quercus robur), white willow (Salix alba), and the shrubs coinwort cotoneaster (Cotoneaster nummularius), cherry plum (Prunus divaricata), grey willow (Salix cinerea), Greek juniper (Juniperus excelsa), breaking buckthorn (Frangula alnus), alder buckthorn (Frangula alnus) and mahaleb cherry (Prunus mahaleb). Steppe-like vegetation is spread over wide areas in the caldera. Those are mainly species of milkvetch (Astragalus). Other subshrubs and herbaceous plants are prickly thrift (Acantholimon), sainfoin (Onobrychis), sheep's sorrel (Rumex acetosella), Thymus, Alyssum, sheep's fescue (Festuca ovina), Salvia, Ranunculus, Silene, rabbitfoot clover (Trifolium arvense), Pimpinella, Artemisia, squarrose (Centaurea triumfettii). Reedy areas are present In the northwestern part of Lake Nemrıt.

=== Fauna ===
The griffon vulture brood their eggs at the caldera, which earned its status of special protected area as habitat for breeding of velvet duck and golden eagle. The number of bird species decreased at Lake Nemrut, which is a stopover site for a lot of migrating birds, due to irregular and uncontrolled hunting. Currently, observed animals in the region are the bird species partridge, duck, bee-eater, Armenian gull and mammals hare, fox, bear. The chamois has been extinct.

== Natural monument and Ramsar site ==
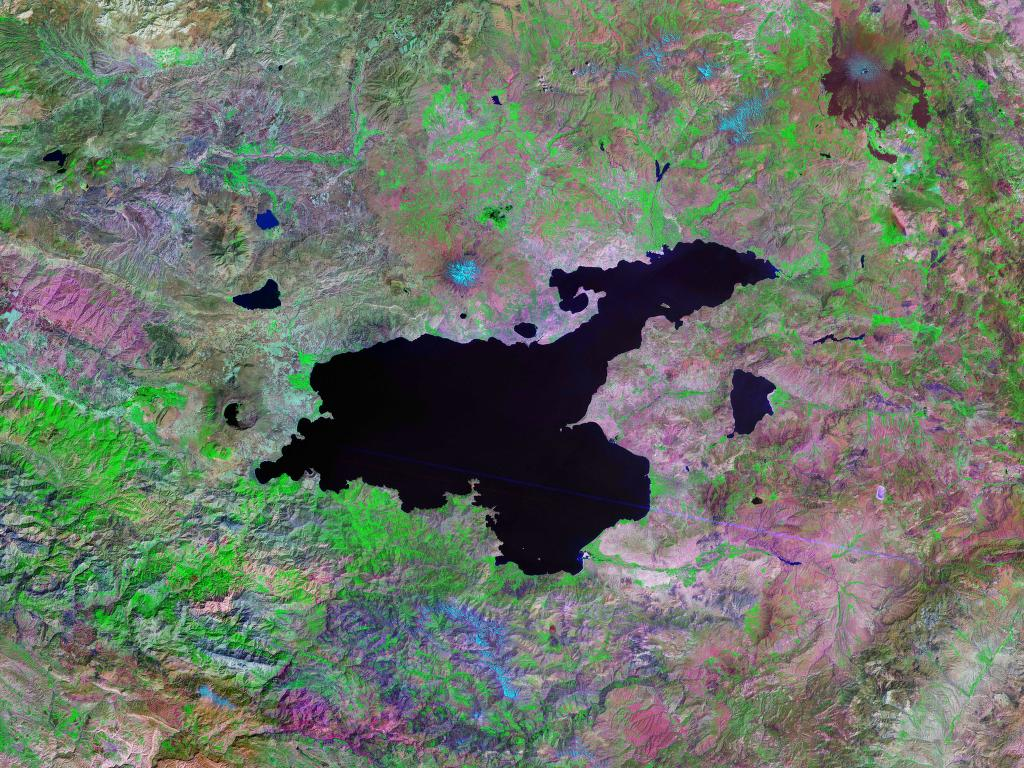
Lakes near Lake Van.

The caldera was registered a natural monument in 2003. The protected area around the crater lake covers 4.8 km^{2} (1.9 sq mi). Nemrut Caldera Natural Monument (Turkish: Nemrut Kalderası Tabiat Anıtı) is protected in the status of a tourist attraction, a protected area of first degree and a wetland.

The government of Turkey designated the wetland of the caldera as the 14th Ramsar site of the country on April 17, 2013.

It is not permitted to cut reed in the caldera and to fish in the lake, although some livestock grazing takes place around the caldera. A winter sports and ski center was established on the southern slope of the caldera in 2007. The main threat in terms of ecology is overgrazing.

== See also ==
- Lake Akdoğan
- Mount Meydan
