= Tombstones of Ahlat =

Historical stone tombs in Ahlat

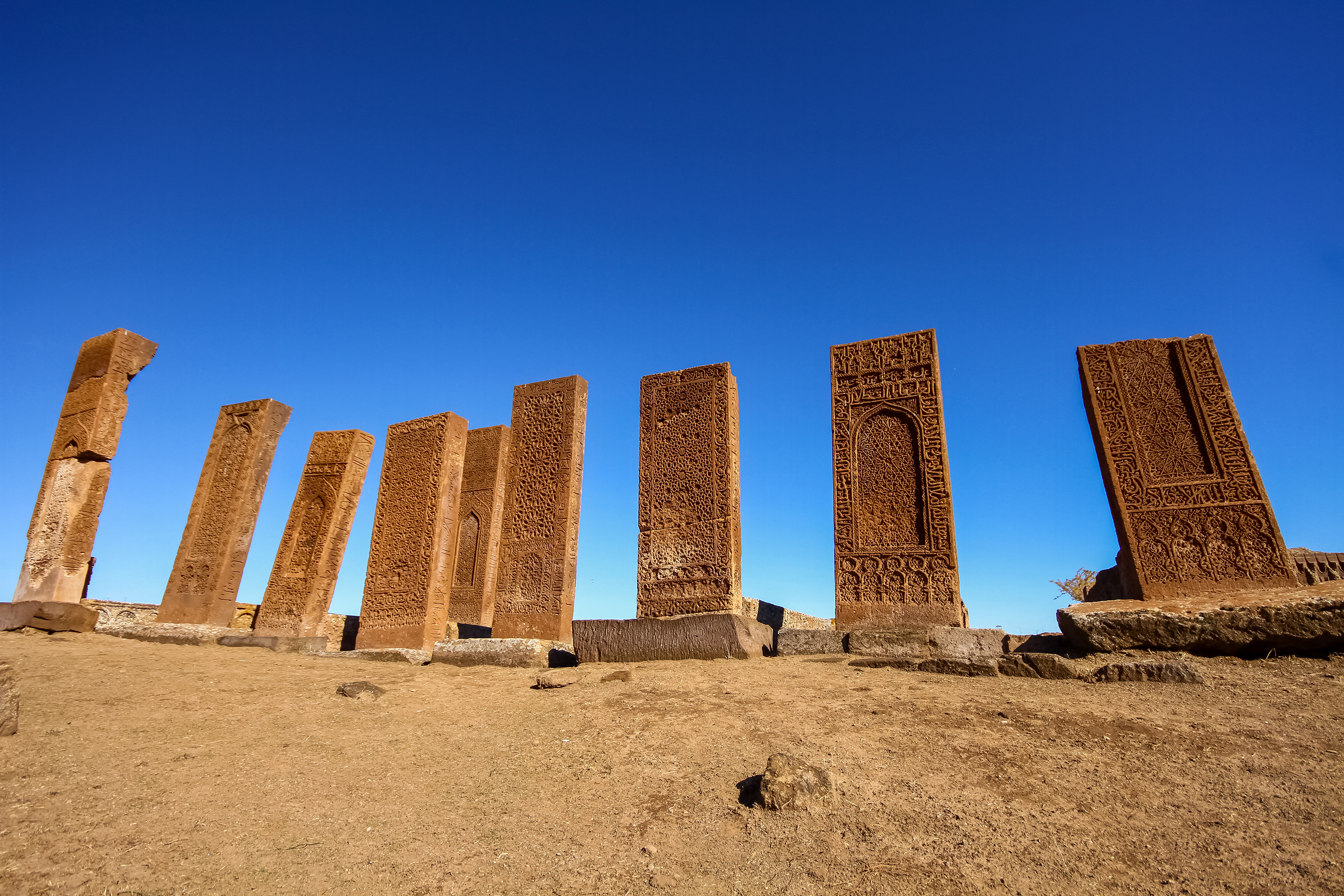
- Tombstones of Ahlat
- Interactive map of Tombstones of Ahlat

Details
- Established: 1200
- Location: Ahlat, Bitlis, Turkey
- Country: Turkey
- Coordinates: 38°44′35″N 42°27′29″E
- Type: Civil Cemetery
- No. of graves: 8200
- The Political Graveyard: Open-air museum

The Tombstones of Ahlat is the world's largest Turkish-Islamic cemetery in the Middle Ages, located in the Ahlat district of Bitlis in Turkey. The cemetery is an open-air museum today.

Dating from the thirteenth century, the tombs cover a large area and previously contained Christian cemeteries, which have been entirely destroyed. They display the influence of Armenian Christian cross-stones (khachkars).

Ahlat is a district center in Bitlis Province at the Lake Van shore. The tombstones are in and around the citadel of Ahlat at about 38°45′N 42°30′E.

The most important tombstones are in the cemeteries known as Harabe şehir cemetery, Taht'ı Suleyman cemetery, Kırklar cemetery, Kale cemetery, Merkez cemetery and Meydanlık cemetery. Among these, only the Kale cemetery has Ottoman tombs .

== History ==
The history of the city dates back to 900 BC, the Urartu era but the tombstones are from the medieval age. Although the tombstones are known as Seljukid era, according to the governorship of Ahlat they belong to the era of the Shah-Armens, Ayyubid dynasty, the Mongol and the Safavid eras. These periods correspond to the 12th-15th centuries.

The city was referred to as Khlat in Byzantine times, Khelath in Assyrian times, Halt in Arab times, and Ahlat in Iranian and Turkish times. It presided over a number of kingdoms, from the Hurrians in 4000 B.C. to the Ottoman era. Following 1071, it served as the Turkish base as they moved from the east to the west. It has served as the capital of the Shah-Armens, a Seljuk clan, since the early 12th century. Ahlat holds a significant position in the lives of academics, religious leaders, artists, Sufis, and believers that it reared. Because of this characteristic, it is known as "Kubbet-ül Islam" in the Islamic world and has been likened to Bukhara (Uzbekistan) and Balkh (Afghanistan).

== World Heritage Status ==
This site was added to the UNESCO World Heritage Tentative List on February 25, 2000, in the Cultural category.
