= Yumurtatepe, Bitlis =

Village in Turkey

Yumurtatepe
- Village
- Location in Turkey
- Coordinates: 38°26′25″N 42°7′32″E
- Country: Turkey
- Province: Bitlis
- District: Bitlis
- Population (2021): 502
- Time zone: UTC+3 (TRT)

Yumurtatepe is a village in the Bitlis District of Bitlis Province in Turkey. Its population is 502 (2021). It was formerly known as Papşin or Papşén.

Before the deportations and genocide of the village's Armenian inhabitants, Papşin/Babshen had a population of 325 individuals in 1909. Located to the village's west was Surp Harutyun church and to its East was a chapel named Lusabdugh Surp Sahak.
