= Nemrut (volcano) =

Volcano in Turkey

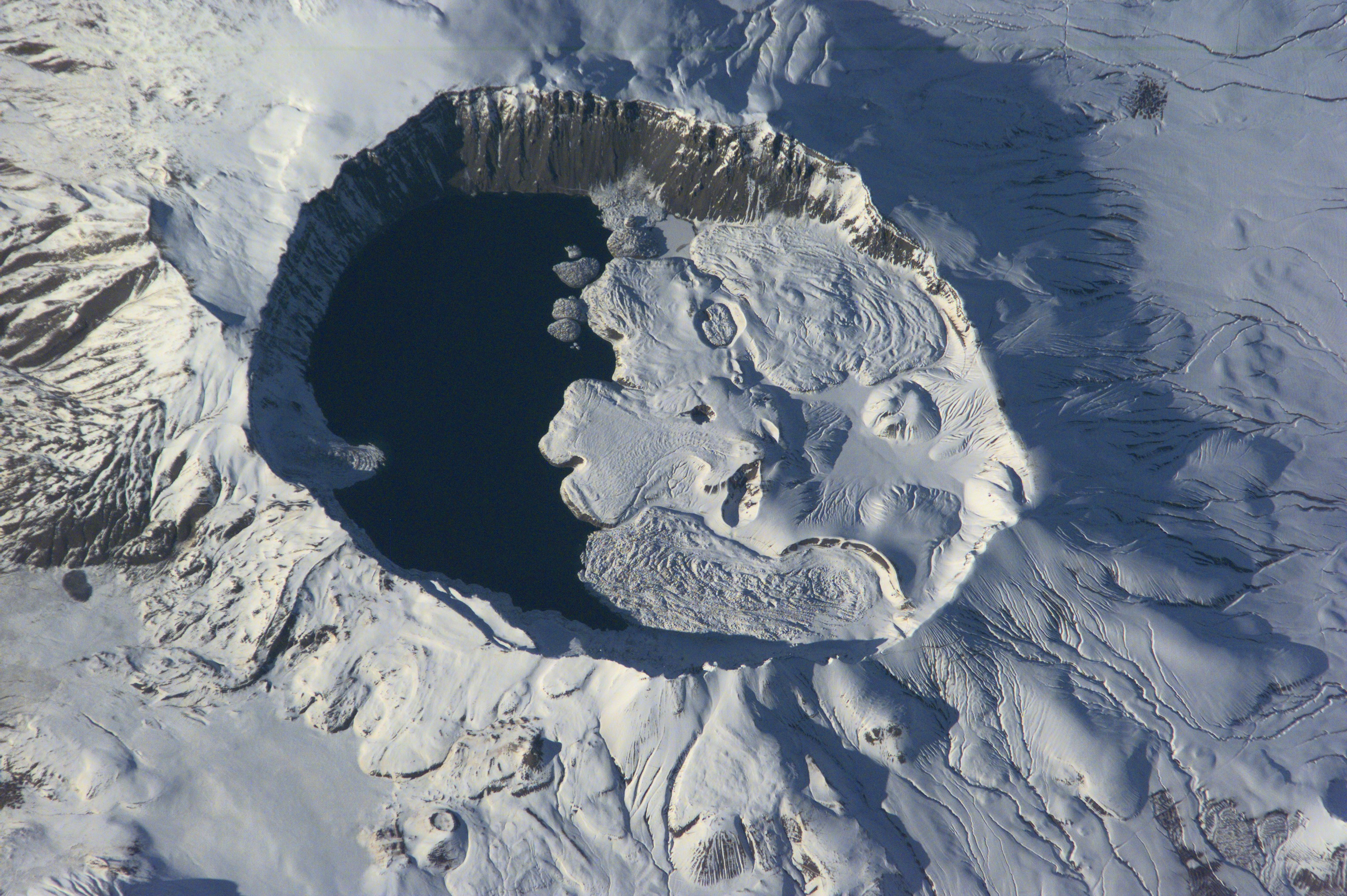
- Satellite view (2001)

Highest point
- Elevation: 2,948 m (9,672 ft)
- Coordinates: 38°37′10″N 42°14′28″E

Geography
- Location within Turkey
- Location: Turkey
- Parent range: Armenian Highlands

Geology
- Mountain type: Stratovolcano
- Last eruption: October 1650

Nemrut (Turkish: Nemrut Dağı, Armenian: Սարակն Sarakn, "Mountain spring", Armenian pronunciation: [sɑˈɾɑkən], Kurdish: Çiyayê Nemrudê) is a dormant volcano in Tatvan district, Bitlis province, Eastern Turkey, close to Lake Van. The volcano is named after King Nimrod who is said to have ruled this area in about 2100 BC.

There is Lake Nemrut in the crater of the mountain. The most powerful eruptions of Nemrut occurred in the Pleistocene. Many small eruptions occurred during the Holocene, the last in 1650. The top of the volcano is a large caldera hosting three crater lakes.

== Overview ==
Nemrut is a polygenetic stratovolcano located in the collision zone of the Arabian and Eurasian tectonic plates, which determines the seismic and volcanic activity in the region. The collision of these plates began in the Middle Eocene and closed the stretch of water, which in the Mesozoic formed the Tethys Ocean. Nemrut, along with three other volcanoes of eastern Turkey: Ararat, Tendürek and Süphan, is located in the area of a complex fault, which runs along the boundary of the Arabian and Eurasian plates in the territory of the Armenian Highland. It is the westernmost of these volcanoes.

Nemrut was probably formed in the early Quaternary Period, about 1 million years ago. It showed the greatest activity in the Pleistocene, with regular eruptions occurring in the Holocene. In the middle Pleistocene, about 250,000 years ago, a major eruption formed a lava flow over 60 km long, which blocked the water discharge from the Van basin and formed Lake Van, the world's largest alkali endorheic lake. In the same period, the conical top of the volcano collapsed inward, forming an 8.3×7 km caldera. Later, the freshwater Lake Nemrut formed inside the caldera. Subsequent eruptions separated a small lake Ilı from Lake Nemrut.

Nemrut volcano has an elliptical shape, its size at the base is 27×18 km, and its center contains 377.5 km^{3} of volcanic materials. The caldera of Nemrut is the largest in Turkey, the fourth-largest in Europe and the sixteenth-largest in the world.

== History of study ==
=== Etymology ===
Locals link the name of the volcano with the legendary ruler Nimrod, who is credited with the construction of the Tower of Babel. Turkish chronicles of the 16th century reproduce a local legend as follows:

Native believe that Nemruz used to spend the winters around and the summers on this mountain. For this purpose, he had a castle and a palace built on the summit. He lived and spent much time there. He fell victim to God's wrath and was caught. Consequently, the god let this mountain, the height of which was not less than 2000 zira collapse and sink 1500 zira. This sinking created a lake of 5000 zira wide.

=== Medieval chronicles ===
Eruptions of Nemrut are mentioned in Armenian sources of the 15th century and Kurdish sources of the 16th century. These records allowed to confirm the activity of the volcano during the Holocene and to establish the dates of some eruptions.

In 1441 a great sign took place, for the mountain called Nemrud, which lies between Kelath and Bitlis, suddenly began to rumble like heavy thunder. This set the whole land into terror and consternation, for one saw that the mountain was rent asunder to the breadth of a city; and from out of this cleft flames arose, shrouded in dense, whirling smoke, of so evil a stench that men fell ill by reason of the deadly smell. Red-hot stones glowed in the terrible flames, and boulders of enormous size were hurled aloft with peals of thunder. Even in other provinces men saw all this distinctly.

A more recent eruption in 1597 is mentioned in Turkish records:

In the northern part of this location there is a canal through which flows a dark water [basaltic magma]. It resembles the dark water which flows off the blacksmith's bellows and its weight is heavier than iron. It spouts upward and quickly flows down to the gorge. According to me, each year this water increases and decreases. It jets more than 30 zira and spreads around longer than 100 zira. And there it spouts out from several points [rift zone]. Whoever has the intention to separate part of this water will face great difficulties [hard basaltic rock].

The last recorded eruption took place in 1692. The mountain's Armenian name (Armenian: Սարակն: angry) might reflect the regular activity of the volcano in the historical period.

=== Studies in the 19th century ===
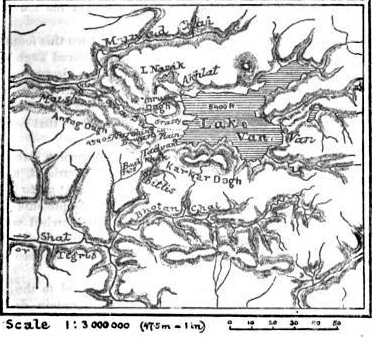
A 19th century map of the Nemrut area composed by a British traveler.

The first systematic studies of the volcano began in the mid-19th century, when, taking advantage of the British influence in the region, it was visited by several European explorers. They described and mapped the area, and some, including the British archaeologist Austen Henry Layard, explored the remains of Urartu fortresses around Lake Van. In this period it was suggested that the unusual structure of the watersheds in the region, and the very formation of Lake Van, is related to a large volcanic eruption and the blocking of the water discharge to Murat River by the lava flow.

The most detailed work on the subject was the doctoral thesis of the English scientist Felix Oswald, "A Treatise on the Geology of Armenia", which devotes a large part to Nemrut. Oswald made and documented many measurements and observations. He also suggested possible ways of the evolution of Nemrut, most of which were confirmed later.

=== Modern research ===
In the 20th century, the scientific study of the volcano was interrupted by the political instability in the region. In the first half of the 20th century Nemrut was wrongly classified as an extinct volcano. Only in the 1980s, with the resumption of the studies, its status was changed to dormant. Currently Nemrut is mainly studied by Turkish volcanologists. The volcano is still poorly understood, and there is no consensus on the interpretation of stratigraphic data. Analysis of the sediments of Lake Van, which is near the volcano, allowed clarification of the chronology and activity of recent eruptions. The potential activity of Nemrut and the close proximity of several Turkish cities inspired recent in-depth studies. In October 2003, the first in Turkey real-time seismic network of sensors has been installed around the volcano. During the first three years of operation the network has registered 133 seismic events, with magnitudes of 1.3–4.0.

== Volcanic activity ==
Eruptions of Mt Nemrut were mainly of Plinian type. Their products are mainly alkaline and include a wide range of lavas: from basalt to rhyolite and phonolite, as well as pyroclastic emissions and slag. Eruption of different periods were either effused or explosive. Nemrut is located on a fault that crosses the volcano from the north to the south and contains the main crater and a number of small craters, maars, hot springs and fumaroles.

Structure of Nemrut
View from space in winter	Caldera viewed from its south-eastern edge	Red line shows the Nemrut fault with arrows indicating directions of lava flows

The volcanic activity of Mt Nemrut occurred in three stages: the formation of a cone (pre-caldera stage), the post-caldera stage, and the late stage. Further, divisions are debatable and are based on different interpretations of the stratigraphic data.

=== Formation of volcanic cone ===
The formation of Mt Nemrut and the first stage of eruptions began about 1 million years ago with fissure eruptions that later localized in separate vents separated by 5–10 km. These eruptions resulted in a strong (thicker than 50 m) layer of successive pyroclastic deposits consisting mainly of trachyte. Their products covered an area of 500 km^{2}, forming a plateau that hid the continental deposits of the Miocene period.

The cone of Nemrut was further formed by mobile dark trachytic lavas, which gradually filled Bitlis gorge to a distance of 80 km from the volcanic center. Lava flows reached a width of 200 m and had a thickness of 5–30 meters. Consequent deposits from basalt and trachytic lavas finalized a pronounced cone with a height of about 4400-4500 m.

The next major eruption (volume 62.6 km^{3}) created large voids inside the volcano, which led to the collapse of the apex and the formation of the caldera. Initially it was assumed that the caldera formed right after this eruption, about 310 thousand years ago; however, more recent studies suggest that the collapse happened with the next eruption, about 270 thousand years ago. The products of this eruption mostly consisted of ignimbrites (c. 58.2 km^{3}). Thus the collapse of the cone occurred gradually, probably in three stages.

=== Post-caldera stage ===
After the formation of the caldera, eruptions were localized to its edge and formed more than ten small craters, mostly on the northern edge. The products were dominated by viscous trachyte and rhyolite lavas. Pyroclastic flow deposits have accumulated on the bottom of the caldera, forming ignimbrites and obsidian, and sometimes slag pumice. A cone-shaped crater Göltepe (height 2,485 m above sea level) formed at the bottom of the caldera, on the fault line.

=== Late stage ===
At this stage, about 20 small craters and maars formed at the cracks located on the caldera floor, mostly along the central fault. A number of craters with diameters of 10–100 m formed outside of the main cone, mainly in its northern part. They include Girigantepe (2433 m), Arizintepe (2445 m), Kayalitepe (2311 m), Mezarliktepe (2409 m), Atlitepe (2281 m), Amis (2166 m), Kevriağa (2087 m), Avuştepe and Sivritepe, which is the highest point of Nemrut. Basaltic lava of these craters are the youngest volcanic rocks within Nemrut. The last eruption took place on 13 April 1692. Since then only bursts of steam have been observed at the bottom of the caldera, indicating fumarolic activity.

=== Summary of eruptions ===
Date	Main products	Eruption type	Dating method and ref.
13 April 1692	?	Emission of gas and volcanic ash	Armenian chronicles
1597	Obsidian, basalts	Lava flow	Kurdish chronicles
1441	Obsidian, basalts	Lava flow	Armenian chronicles
657 ± 24 BC	Volcanic ash	Emission of ash	Analysis of Lake Van sediments
787 ± 25 BC	Volcanic ash	Emission of ash	Analysis of Lake Van sediments
4,055 ± 60 BC	Volcanic ash	Emission of ash	Analysis of Lake Van sediments
4,938 ± 69 BC	Volcanic ash	Emission of ash	Analysis of Lake Van sediments
5,242 ± 72 BC	Volcanic ash	Emission of ash	Analysis of Lake Van sediments
18,000 ± 2,000 BC	Rhyolites	Lava flow
c. 28,000 BC	Rhyolites	Lava flow	K–Ar dating
80,000 ± 20,000 BC	Olivine basalts	Lava flow	K–Ar dating
100,000 ± 20,000 BC	Trachybasalts	Lava flow	K–Ar dating
c. 150,000 BC	Comendites	Lava flow	K–Ar dating
c. 240,000 BC	Quartz trachytes	Lava flow	K–Ar dating
c. 270,000 BC	Ignimbrites	Emission of volcanic ash, formation of caldera	K–Ar dating
c. 310,000 BC	Trachytes	Lava flows	Isotopic dating
c. 330,000 BC	Quartz trachytes	Lava flows	K–Ar dating
c. 380,000 BC	Quartz trachytes	Lava flows	K–Ar dating
c. 565,000 BC	Quartz trachytes	Lava flows	K–Ar dating
c. 700,000 BC	Trachytes	Lava flows	K–Ar dating
c. 790,000 BC	Olivine basalts	Lava flows	K–Ar dating
c. 1,010,000 BC	Trachytes	Lava flows	K–Ar dating

== Historical role ==
Besides the legendary relationship of the volcano with King Nimrod, in the 1990s scientists discovered that Nemrut played an important role in the life of the first civilizations. Despite the abundance of obsidian sources in Anatolia and Iran, Nemrut was the main source of obsidian – the most important material of the Stone Age – for all settlements in Mesopotamia and the settlements of the Mesolithic era around the Dead Sea. The analysis of obsidian products revealed that the population of those areas used obsidian from only two sources: Nemrut and the nearby dormant volcano Bingöl. An ancient center of obsidian processing and trade was found at Lake Van, which was part of one of the earliest trade routes.

Obsidian in culture
Obsidian deposits at the bottom of Nemrut caldera	Obsidian arrowhead	Obsidian eye in an ancient sculpture

Two eruptions of Nemrut were probably witnessed by people of Urartu, an ancient state located in the Armenian highlands. These eruptions occurred c. 787 BC (period of King Menua) and c. 657 BC (period of King Rusa II), and the latter eruption might have caused the sudden disappearance of the city Uaiais located 30 km east of Süphan.

== Present state ==
=== Volcanic activity ===
In the 1980s, Japanese volcanologists studied the evolution of gases inside the caldera of Nemrut. They found that the ratio of helium isotopes ^{3}He/^{4}He is 1.06×10^{−5} indicates volcanic activity (most of the measured helium evolved from the mantle). More recent studies have confirmed these findings. The seismic activity in the region is high – in recent years there have been several earthquakes directly related to the Nemrut fault. Significant seismic events of the last 150 years that occurred within 30 km of Nemrut include the earthquakes of 18 May 1881 (magnitude 6.7), 29 March 1907 (5), 27 January 1913 (5), 14 February 1915 (6), and 3 November 1997 (5).

There is evidence that the nature of volcanism in the region may change due to the shift of stress at the boundary of the Arabian and Eurasian plates. The direction of pressure coming from the Arabian plate is gradually turning from south–north to the west–east, with a linear shift of 7.8–9 mm per year. Fumarolic activity and many hot springs are observed at the bottom of the caldera.

Evidence of continuing volcanic activity at Nemrut
A fumarole of Nemrut on the bottom of the caldera	One of the hot springs that feed Lake Nemrut

=== Structure ===
The volcano has an elliptical shape and covers 486 km^{2}. Its center contains 377.5 km^{3} of volcanic material, mainly 0.23–1.18 million years old lava. Nemrut has a distinct caldera with an area of 46.7 km^{2} and a volume of 32.9 km^{3}; the maximum height of the edge of the caldera is 2,935 m (9,629 ft) above sea level (Sivritepe, on the northern edge of the caldera). The average height of the walls of the caldera, measuring from its bottom, is 600 m (2,000 ft). The lowest point of the caldera coincides with the deepest point of Lake Nemrut (2,071 m (6,795 ft) above sea level). There are three lakes at the bottom of the caldera: the larger Lake Nemrut and two smaller ones, Ilı and the so-called "Seasonal Lake".

Lakes within the caldera
Ilı, eastern view	Lake Nemrut, northeastern view	"Seasonal Lake"

==== Lake Nemrut ====
Lake Nemrut (Turkish: Nemrut gölü) is located in the south-western part of the caldera and is now a freshwater lake. Similar to Lake Van, under the influence of volcanic processes it is gradually becoming a saline lake. The lake is fed by hot springs, which is why it is warmer at the bottom than at the surface and does not freeze in winter. The total area is 4.9×2.1 km, the average depth is 140 m, and the maximum depth is 176 m; the altitude of the lake is 2,247 m (7,372 ft) above the sea level.

==== Lake Ilı ====
Lake Ilı (Turkish: Ilı gölü, "hot lake") was split from Lake Nemrut by an ancient lava flow. Ilı is located closer to the fault than Lake Nemrut; therefore it has a larger inflow of hot springs and a higher temperature. In the summer, it sometimes reaches 60 °C, and an average is 6–8 °C warmer than expected for a lake of its altitude. Nevertheless, it partly freezes in winter because of the small size and depth.

=== Risk of future eruptions ===
Recent studies note the danger of possible eruptions. Nemrut is located in close proximity to Tatvan (distance 10 km, population: 66,000), Bitlis (population 52,000), Ahlat (population 22,000), and a number of smaller settlements. In total, about 135,000 people live in the potential eruption zone. The presence of more than 1 km^{3} of water in the caldera adds a risk of flooding, which may destroy Güroymak, a town of 15,000 people.

=== Climate, flora and fauna of the caldera ===
The climate of the caldera is unique for the Armenian Highland. It is the only place in the region where deciduous trees grow at high altitudes, owing to the high temperature and humidity and the protection from winds by the caldera walls. The caldera also hosts a few flowers and trees unique to the region. Velvet scoters (Melanitta deglandi) and two species of gull live and breed on the shores of Lake Nemrut. Since ancient times the bottom of the caldera is used for grazing by the nearby villages.

Flora and fauna of the caldera
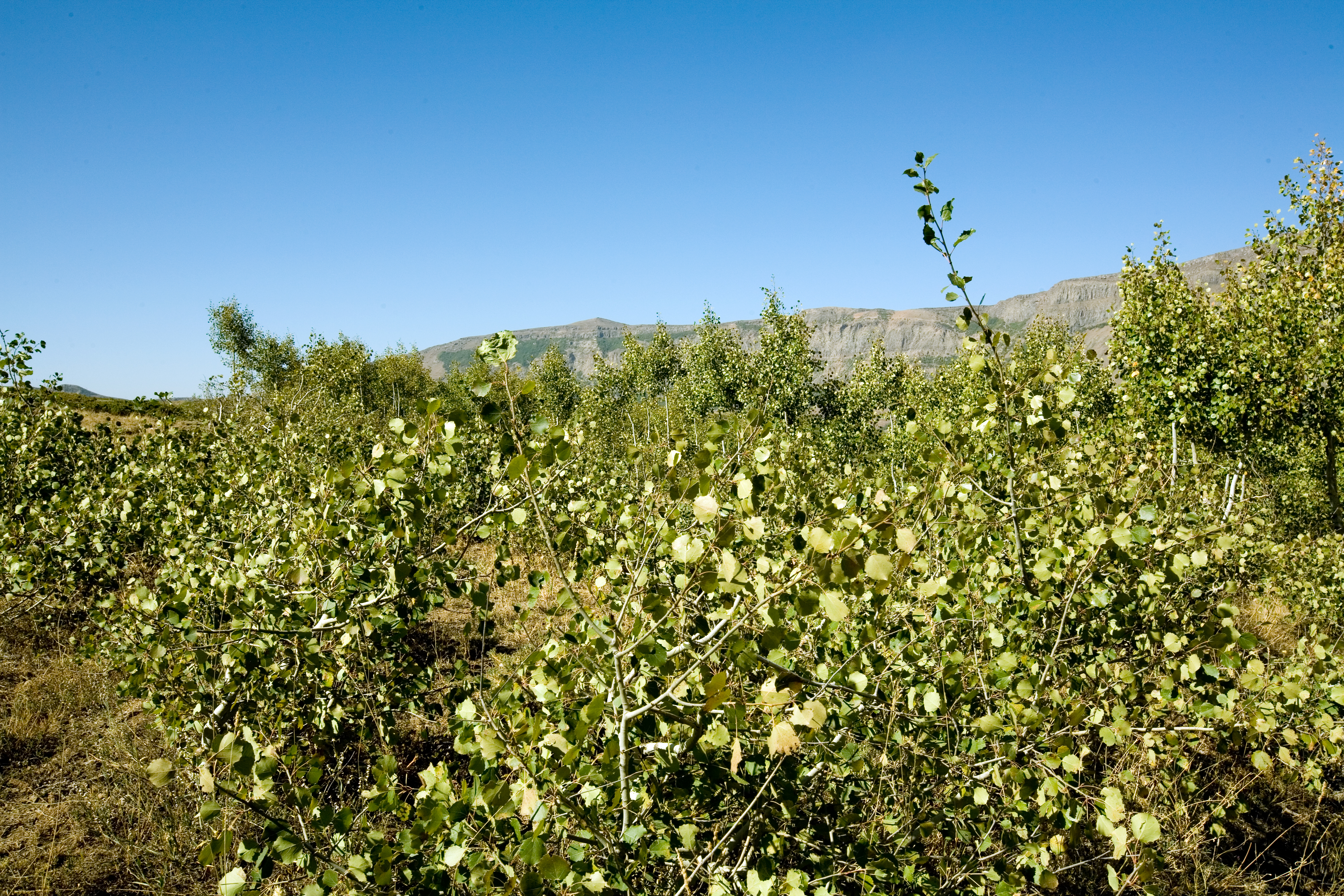
Unusual for the region deciduous vegetation

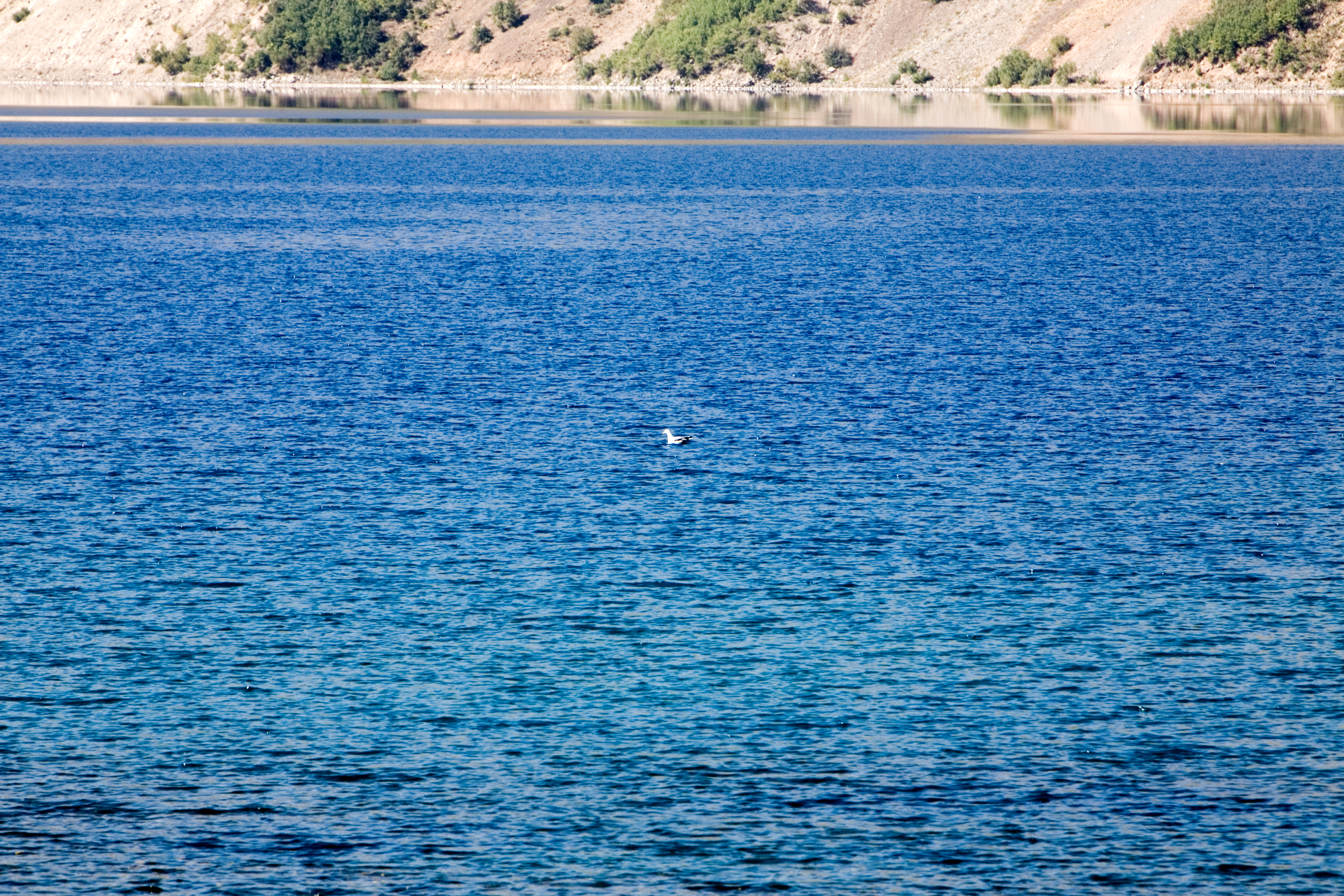
Gull at Lake Nemrut

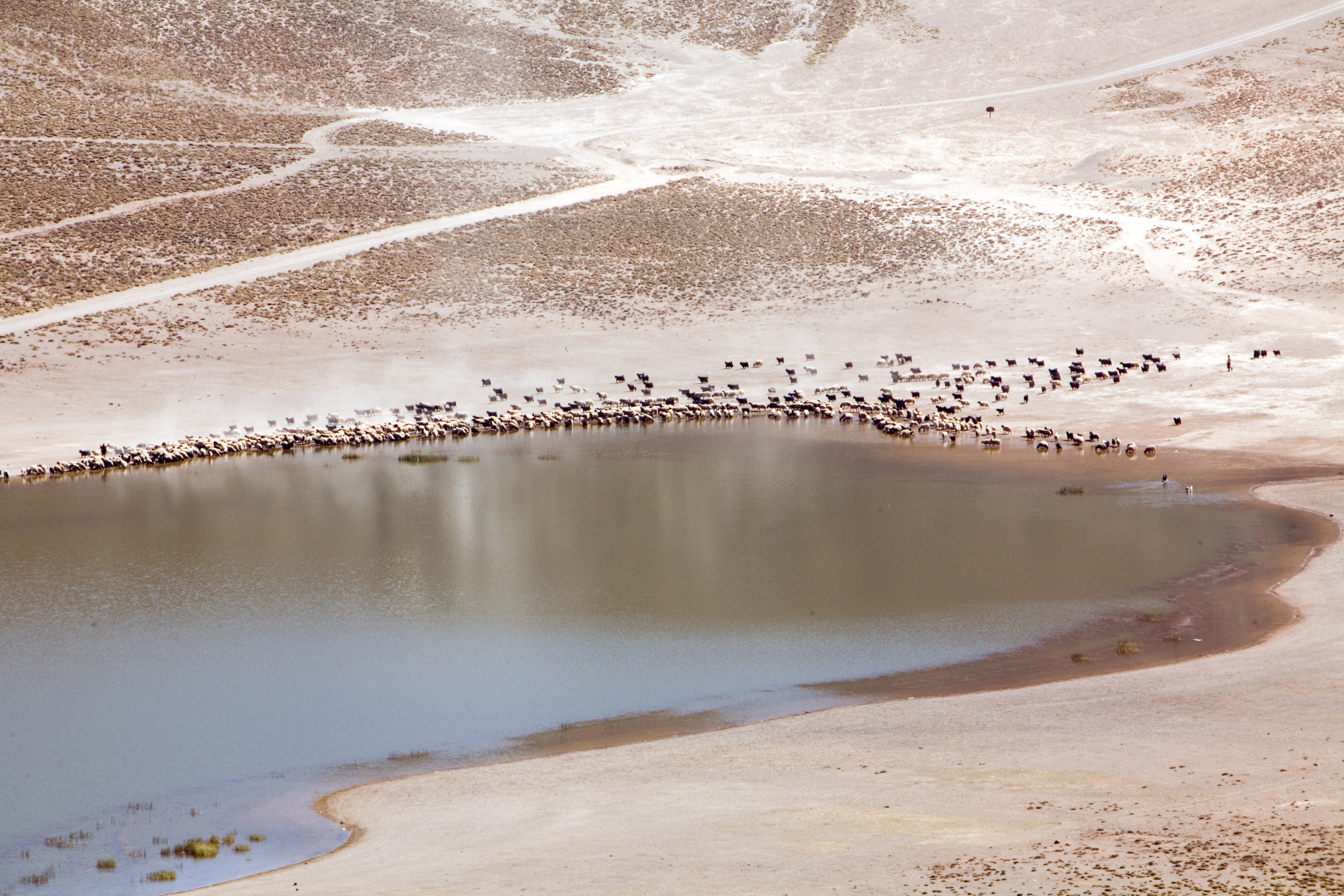
Flock of sheep on the banks of a seasonal hot spring

== Tourism ==
Nemrut is considered one of the most spectacular volcanoes in the region. Its caldera can be accessed in the summer on 4x4 vehicles from the south or east side. Nemrut is covered with snow five months per year, and therefore the Turkish authorities are building a mountain ski resort and a 2,517 m-long (8,258 ft) ski track on the slopes of Nemrut.

Transportation
Left: unfinished chair lift on the southern slope of Nemrut, which will be part of a ski resort. Right: a road to caldera on the south-eastern slope.

== See also ==
- Akdoğan Mountains
- Mount Meydan
