= Bitlis Province =

Province of Turkey

Coordinates: 38°23′13″N 42°07′00″E

Bitlis Province Bitlis ili
- Province
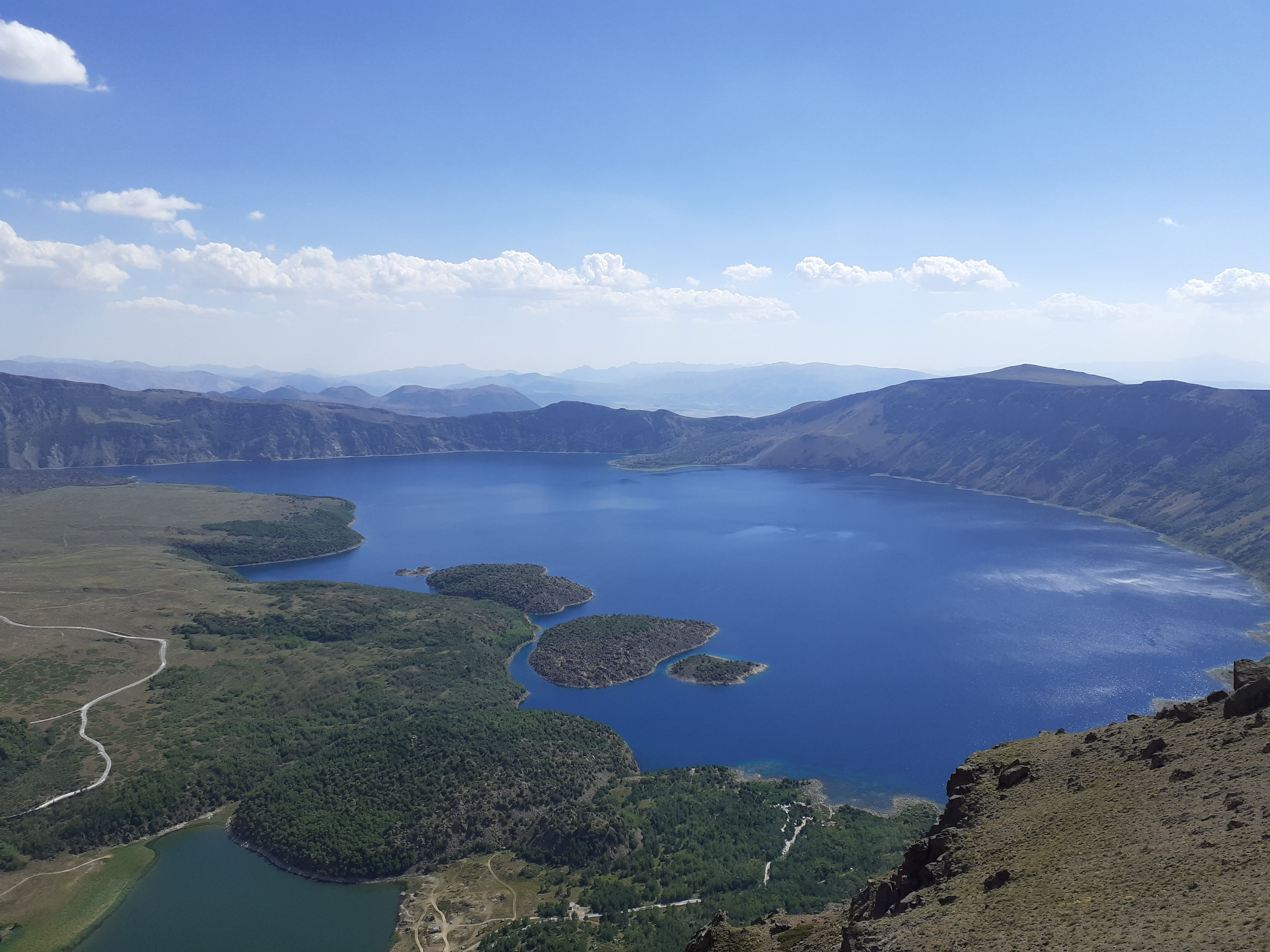
- Lake Nemrut

- Location of the province within Turkey
- Country: Turkey
- Seat: Bitlis

Government
  - Governor: Ahmet Karakaya
- Area: 8,294 km^{2} (3,202 sq mi)
- Population (2022): 353,988
  - Density: 42.68/km^{2} (110.5/sq mi)
- Time zone: UTC+3 (TRT)
- Area code: 0434
- Website: www.bitlis.gov.tr

Bitlis Province (Turkish: Bitlis ili; Armenian: Բաղեշի մարզ, romanized: Bagheshi marz; Kurdish: Parêzgeha Bidlîsê) is a province of eastern Turkey, located to the west of Lake Van. It takes its name from the central city, Bitlis. Its area is 8,294 km^{2}, and its population is 353,988 (2022). The province was part of Moxoene of the Kingdom of Armenia. Before the Armenian genocide, the area was part of the Six Armenian Vilayets and considered part of Western Armenia by Armenians. The province is considered part of Turkish Kurdistan and has a Kurdish majority. The current Governor of the province is Erol Karaömeroğlu.

== History ==
The administrative center was the town of Bitlis which was called Bagesh, in old Armenian sources.

In 1927 the office of the Inspector General was created, which governed with martial law. The Bitlis province was included in the first Inspectorate General (Umumi Müfettişlik, UM) over which the Inspector General ruled. The UM span over the provinces of Hakkâri, Siirt, Van, Mardin, Bitlis, Sanlıurfa, Elaziğ and Diyarbakır. The Inspectorate General was dissolved in 1952 during the Government of the Democrat Party.

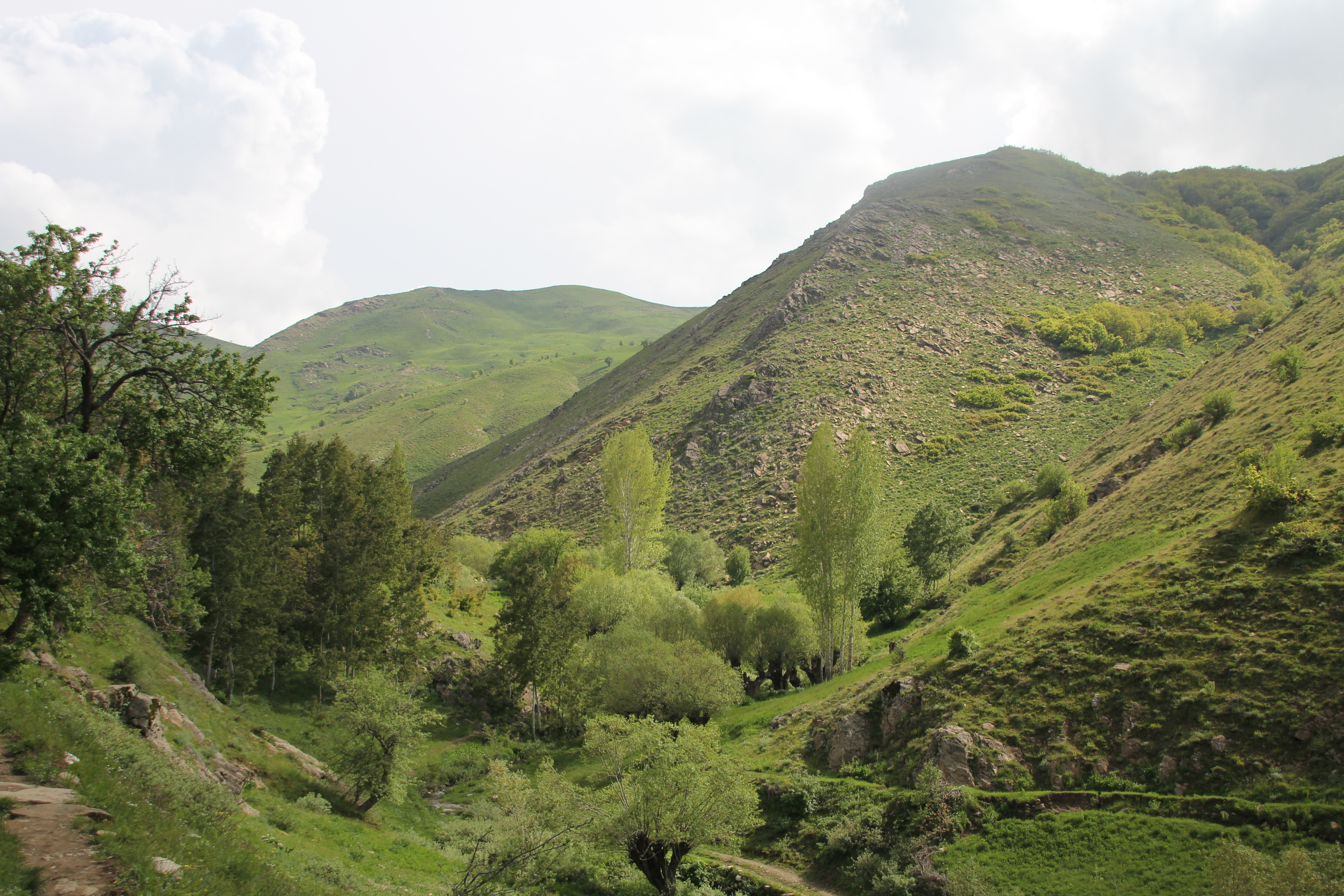
Mountains in Bitlis

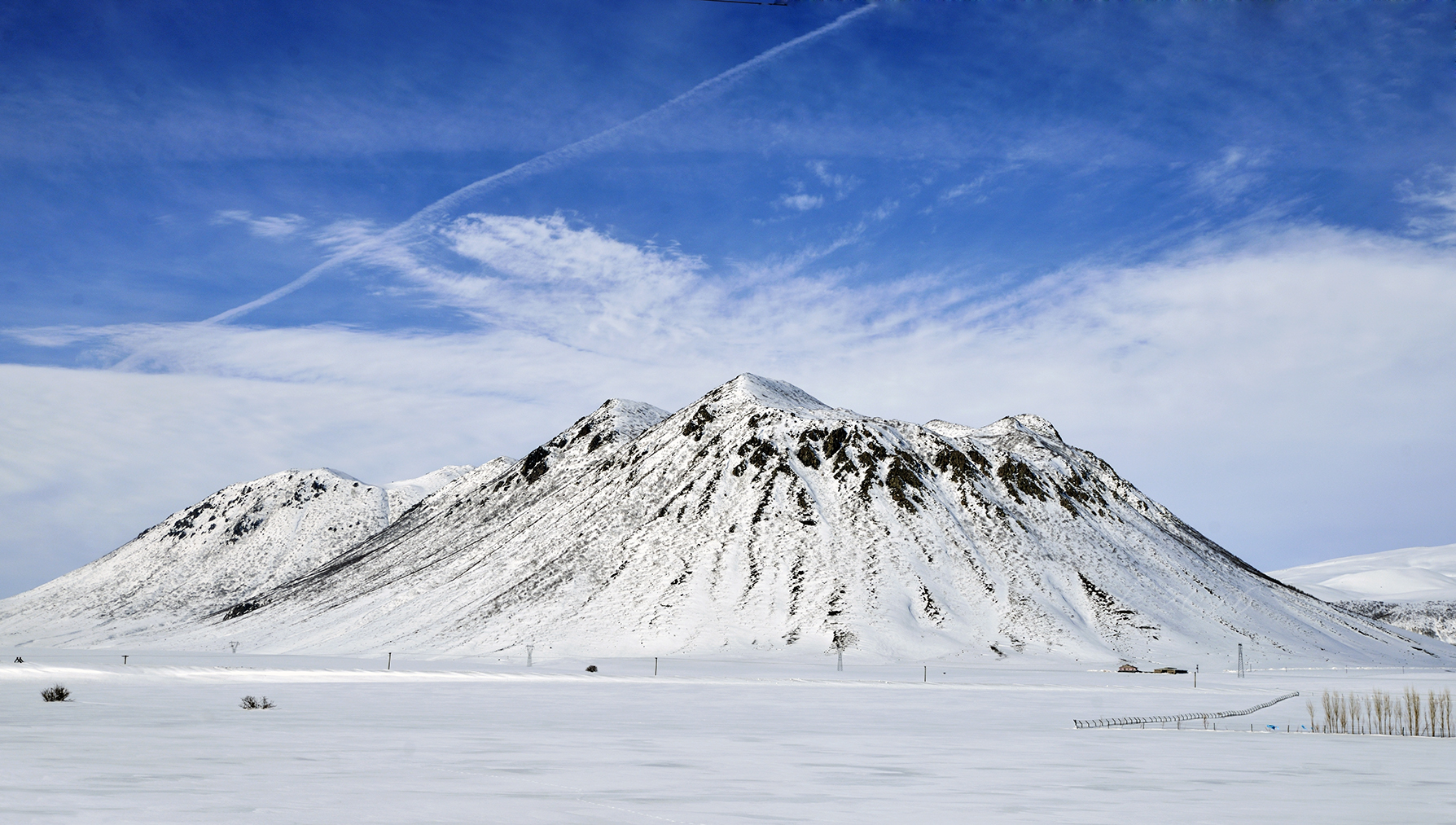
Nemrut (volcano)

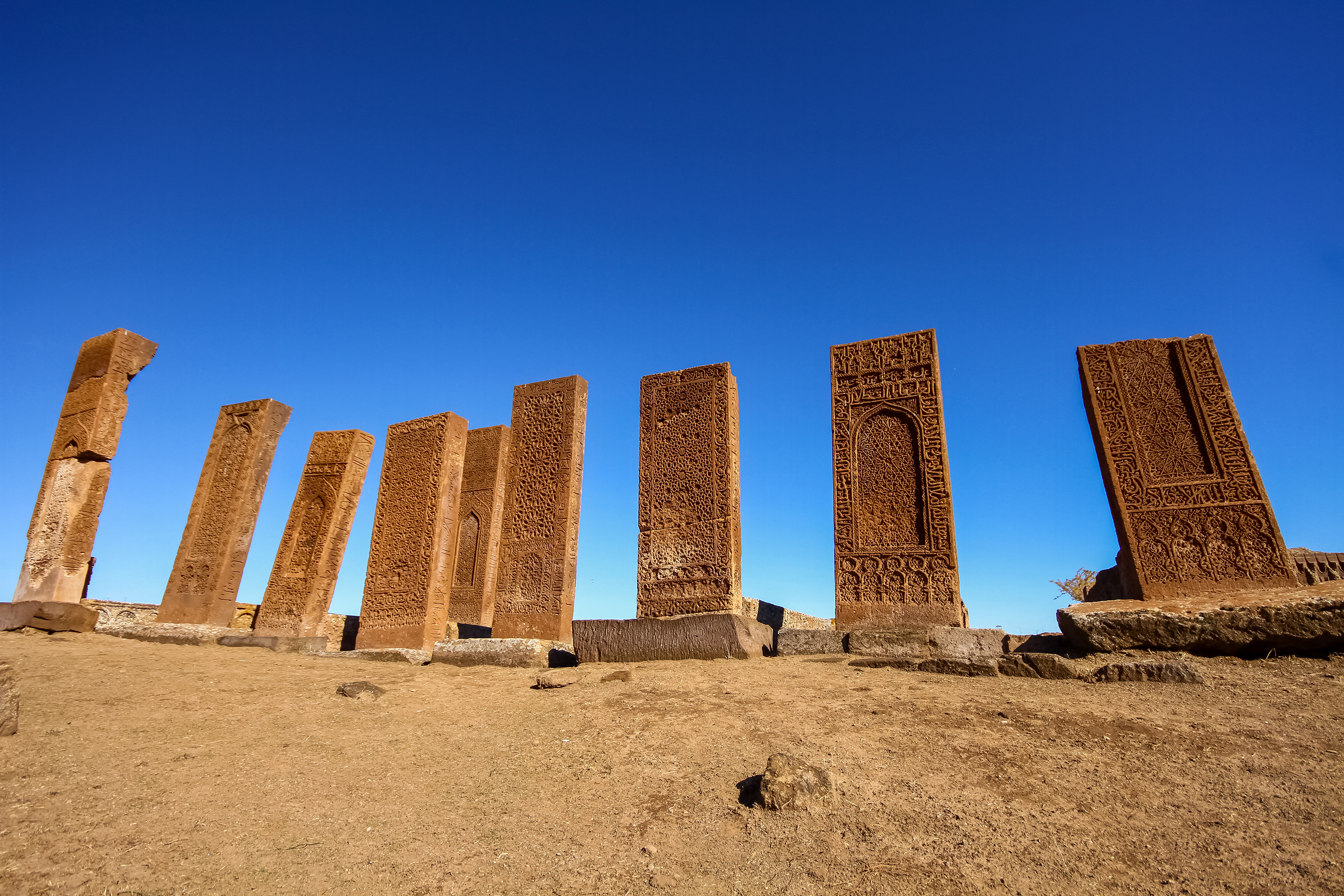
View of the Tombstones of Ahlat

== Tourism ==
The main places with tourism potential in Bitlis are Lake Nemrut, Ahlat Seljuk Cemetery, Ahlat Museum, Mount Süphan, Güroymak Hot Springs and Lake Nazik.

== Demographics ==
Historical population
Year	Pop.	±% p.a.
1927	90,631	—
1940	68,825	−2.09%
1950	88,634	+2.56%
1960	128,966	+3.82%
1970	185,473	+3.70%
1980	257,908	+3.35%
1990	330,115	+2.50%
2000	388,678	+1.65%
2010	328,767	−1.66%
2020	350,994	+0.66%
Source:Turkstat

== Districts ==
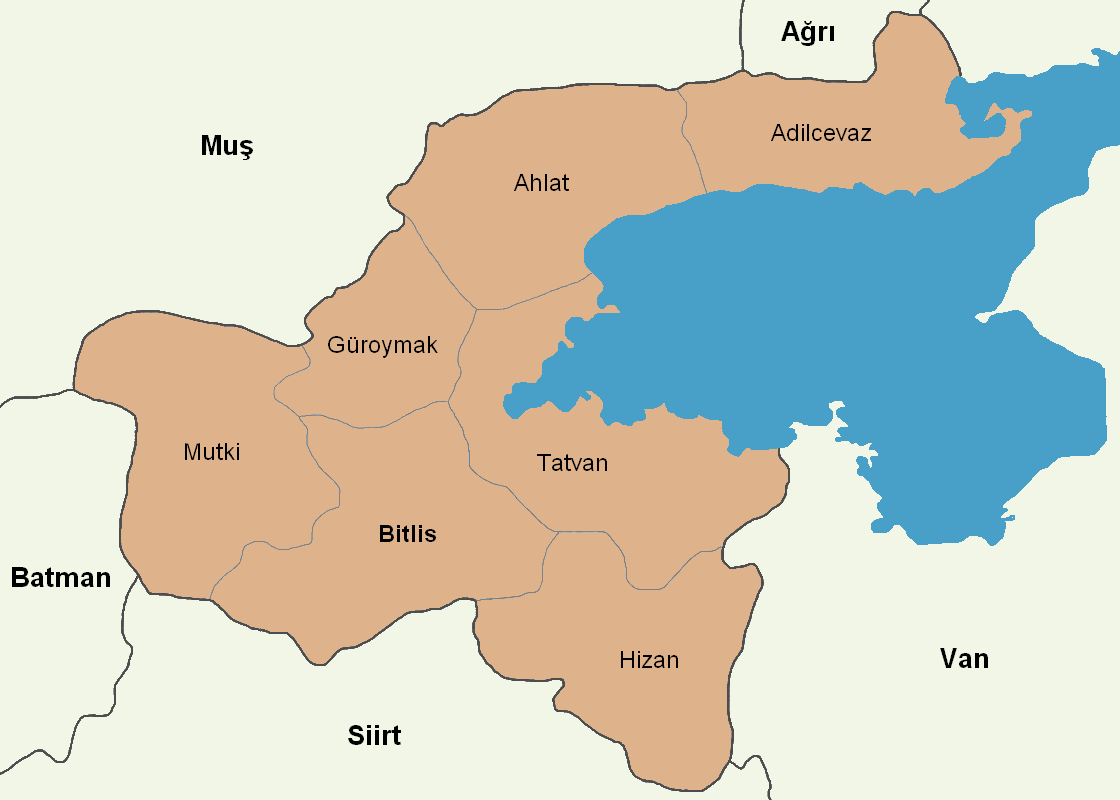

Bitlis Province is divided into 7 districts (the capital district is in bold):

- Adilcevaz
- Ahlat
- **Bitlis**
- Güroymak
- Hizan
- Mutki
- Tatvan

== Geology and geomorphology ==
The main lakes in Bitlis province are Lake Sodalı, Lake Nemrut, Lake Aygır, Lake Batmış and Lake Nazik.

== Economy ==
As of 1920, the province was producing small amounts of iron, copper, lead, and sulphur. Even smaller amounts of gold and silver were found in the areas of Sairt and Khairwan. Salt made up the largest mineral industry in the province, so much that it was exported to surrounding provinces. The salt was produced in pans, using evaporation, and taking 8 to 10 days to mature. The technique and trade was mainly run by local Kurds.

== Attractions ==
- Nemrut (volcano)
- Lake Nemrut
