= Muş Province =

Province of Turkey

Coordinates: 39°00′02″N 41°49′38″E

Muş Province Muş ili
- Province
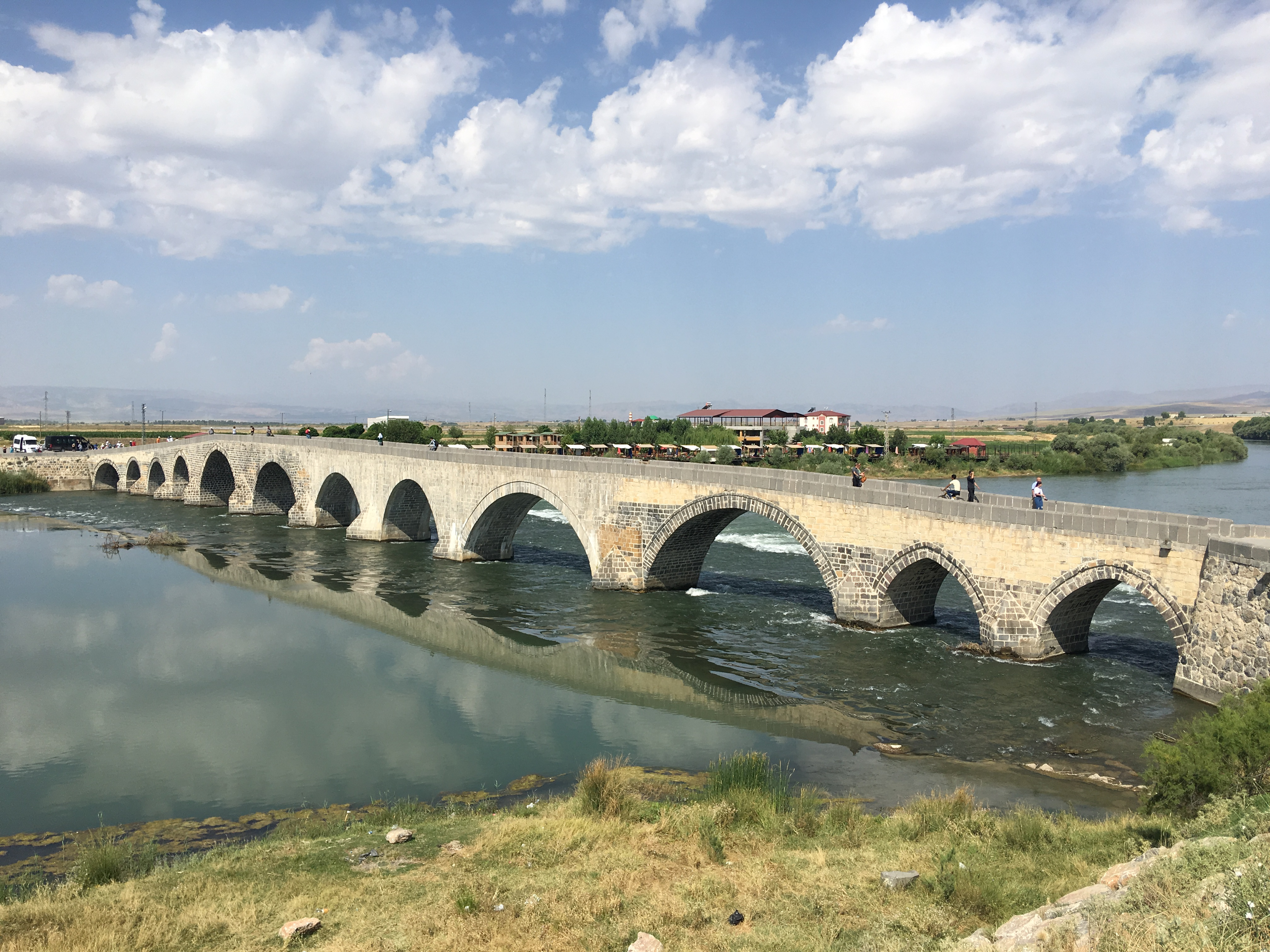
- Murat Bridge, also known as Sulukh Bridge

- Location of the province within Turkey
- Country: Turkey
- Seat: Muş

Government
  - Governor: Avni Çakır
- Area: 8,718 km^{2} (3,366 sq mi)
- Population (2022): 399,202
  - Density: 45.79/km^{2} (118.6/sq mi)
- Time zone: UTC+3 (TRT)
- Area code: 0436
- Website: www.mus.gov.tr

Muş Province (Turkish: Muş ili; Kurdish: Parêzgeha Mûşê; Armenian: Մուշի մարզ, romanized: Mushi marz) is a province in the east Anatolia region of Turkey (Türkiye). Its area is 8,718 km^{2}, and its population is 399,202 (2022), down from 453,654 in 2000. The provincial capital is the city of Muş. Another town in Muş province, Malazgirt (Manzikert), is famous for the Battle of Manzikert of 1071.

The province is considered part of Turkish Kurdistan and has a Kurdish majority.

== History ==
The province is considered a part of historical Western Armenia. Before the Armenian genocide, the area was a part of the Six Armenian Vilayets. Avni Çakır was appointed Governor of the province in August 2023.

== Geology and geomorphology ==
There are a total of 8 mountain ranges, 4 of which are large, in the province. Muş province is surrounded by Otluk Mountains in the middle, Akdoğan Mountains in the north, Bingöl Mountains in the northwest, Şerafettin Mountains in the west, Karaçavuş Mountains in the southwest, Yakupağa Mountains and Bilican Mountains in the southeast, Cemalverdi Mountains in the east. Plains constitute 27.2 percent of the Muş provincial area. The most important are Muş, Bulanık, Malazgirt and Liz Plains.

=== Lakes ===
The main largest lakes in Muş are Lake Akdoğan, Lake Haçlı and Lake Kaz.

=== Plants ===
The main plant species in the Muş province are toxic Ferula and non-toxic Ferula, Rheum ribes, Gundelia, Sorrel, Arum maculatum, Eremurus spectabilis, Diplotaenia cachrydifolia Boiss, Chaerophyllum macrospermum, Thymus (plant), Chondrilla juncea, Tulipa sintenisii, Eryngium billardieri, Chicory, Astragalus kurdicus, Paeonia turcica and Euphorbia sp. In addition, there are Pleurotus eryngii var. ferulae mushrooms in the every high parts of the province. Frangula alnus and Prunus cerasifera are located on the humid shores of the lakes. Oak trees, Crataegus monogyna, Rosa canina, Malus sylvestris, Pyrus elaeagrifolia, Prunus mahaleb, Aria edulis and Cotoneaster nummularius are other trees in the Muş Province.

=== Fauna ===
The main animals in the region are Bear, Wolf, Fox, Pig, Partridge, Lynx, Duck, Turtle, Williams's jerboa, Caspian turtle and European green lizard.

== Tourism ==
The touristic places in Muş are the historical Murat Bridge, the tulips on the Muş Plain, Muş Castle, Haspet Castle, Kepenek Castle, Kayalıdere Castle, Mercimekkale Mound, Lake Akdoğan, Künav Cave, Lake Haçlı, Malazgirt Castle and Esenlik Mosque.

== Transportation ==
The city is served by the Muş Airport. It has a train station and a bus station(MUŞTİ).

== Districts ==
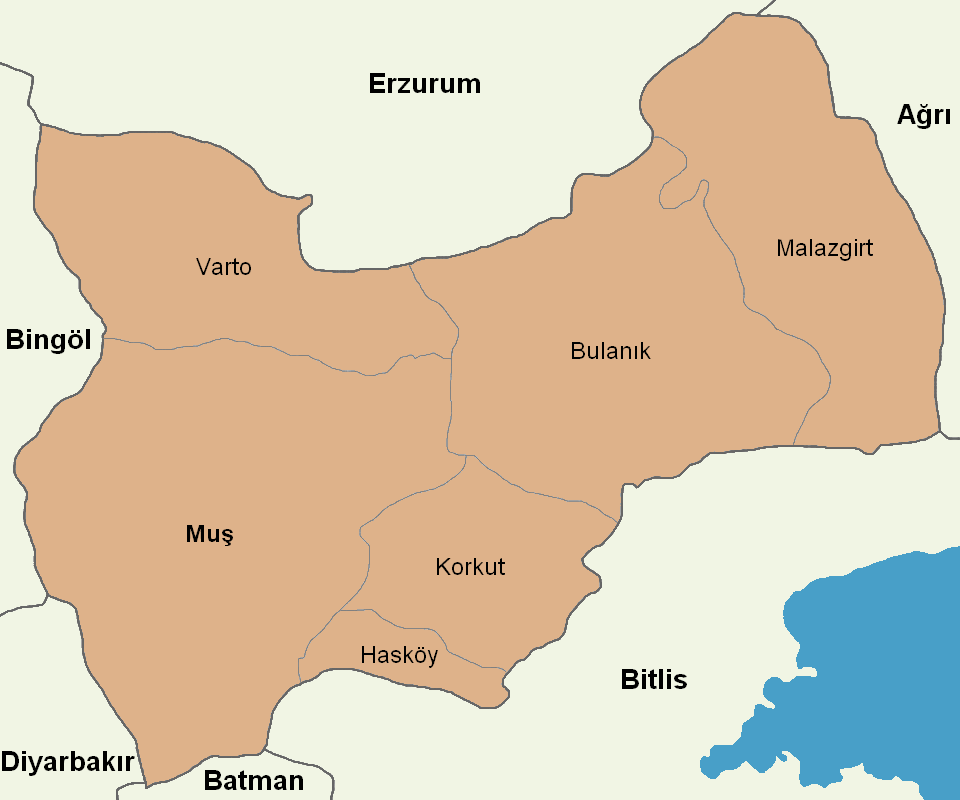
Muş Province's administrative divisions

Muş province is divided into 6 districts (capital district in bold):

- **Muş**
- Varto
- Bulanık
- Malazgirt
- Hasköy
- Korkut

== Economy ==
Historically, Muş was known for producing wheat. The province also grew madder, but locals retained it, using it for dye. The area also had salt mines. As of 1920, the region had so much salt that it was said to have enough to supply Europe and Asia.
