= Gülkoru, Malazgirt =

Gülkoru
- Village
- Location in Turkey
- Coordinates: 39°05′52″N 42°38′55″E
- Country: Turkey
- Province: Muş
- District: Malazgirt
- Population (2022): 1,468
- Time zone: UTC+3 (TRT)

Gülkoru (Armenian: Խարաբերեշ, romanized: Kharaberesh) is a village in the Malazgirt District of Muş Province, Turkey. Its population is 1,468 (2022). Before the 2013 reorganisation, it was a town (belde). It is 11 km from Malazgirt.

== History ==
In the excavations carried out to determine the area where the Battle of Manzikert was held, arrows and spear tips and various war tools were found around the village.

== Population ==
Historical population
Year	Pop.	±% p.a.
1965	945	—
1985	2,224	+4.37%
1990	3,099	+6.86%
1997	4,016	+3.77%
2007	2,328	−5.31%
2012	2,006	−2.93%
2017	1,644	−3.90%
2022	1,468	−2.24%
Source: Population censuses (1965-1997) and TÜIK (2007-2021)
