= Aktuzla, Malazgirt =

Aktuzla
- Village
- Location in Turkey
- Coordinates: 39°19′47″N 42°17′16″E
- Country: Turkey
- Province: Muş
- District: Malazgirt
- Time zone: UTC+3 (TRT)

Aktuzla, is a village in the Malazgirt District, Muş Province, Turkey. Aktuzla is located very close to Lake Kaz.

== Economy ==
In the village, where Turkey's largest source salt is located, there is a facility that produces approximately 120 tons of cooking salt daily with traditional methods.
