= Malazgirt Castle =

Massive stone fortification in Turkey

- Malazgirt, Muş, Turkey

Site information
- Type: Fortress, Fortification
- Open to the public: Yes

Location
- Coordinates: 39°08′49″N 42°32′43″E

Site history
- Materials: Horasan Mortar
- Battles/wars: Siege of Manzikert (1054), Battle of Manzikert

The Malazgirt Castle (Turkish: Malazgirt Kalesi), is a historical fort in the Malazgirt district of Muş. The fort surrounds the city center. It was repaired at various times.

== History ==
It was built by the Byzantines in the 10th century. This castle, which is mentioned as the 'Berber Castle' in Islamic sources, was the scene of many wars both in the early Muslim periods and in the Byzantine period. It is made using black hard stones and Horasan Mortar. After canceling the Egyptian expedition, Sultan Alparslan made his way from the north of Lake Van to the castle of Malazgirt. The castle was previously surrounded by his uncle Tuğrul on two occasions and could not be taken.
