= Bulanık Plain =

Plain in the Armenian Highlands

The Bulanık Plain (Turkish: Bulanık Ovası), is located in the northern of the city center of Bulanık. The area of the plain is 525.2 km2. This plain looks like a thin strip along the Murat river. The length of the plain is about 20 km. In the Bulanık plain, grain and plenty of sheep and cattle are usually grown.

== Geology and geomorphology ==
Bulanık and Malazgirt plains are located 101 kilometers east of Muş city center. Bilican Mountains in the south, Akdoğan Mountains in the west, Lala and Top Mountain in the north, and Patnos district in the east. The morphological basin features of the Bulanık-Malazgirt basin made the region rich in water resources. The fact that the basin is surrounded by mountainous areas with an average height of between 1800 and 2700 meters is an important factor that has an impact on the increase in the potential of surface waters and groundwater.

=== Fauna ===
The last 11 individuals of the Demoiselle crane living in Turkey live in the Bulanık Plain.
