= Eastern Anatolia region =

Region in West Asia

Eastern Anatolia Region Doğu Anadolu Bölgesi
- Region
- Country: Turkey

Area
  - Total: 165,436 km^{2} (63,875 sq mi)

Population
  - Total: 6,513,106
  - Density: 39.3693/km^{2} (101.966/sq mi)

GDP
  - Total: US$ 28.582 billion (2022)
  - Per capita: US$ 4,390 (2022)

The Eastern Anatolia region (Turkish: Doğu Anadolu Bölgesi) is a geographical region of Turkey. The most populous province in the region is Van Province. Other populous provinces are Malatya Province, Erzurum Province and Elazığ Province.

It is bordered by the Black Sea Region and Georgia in the north, the Central Anatolia Region in the west, the Mediterranean Region in the southwest, the Southeastern Anatolia Region and Iraq in the south, and Armenia, Azerbaijan, and Iran in the east.

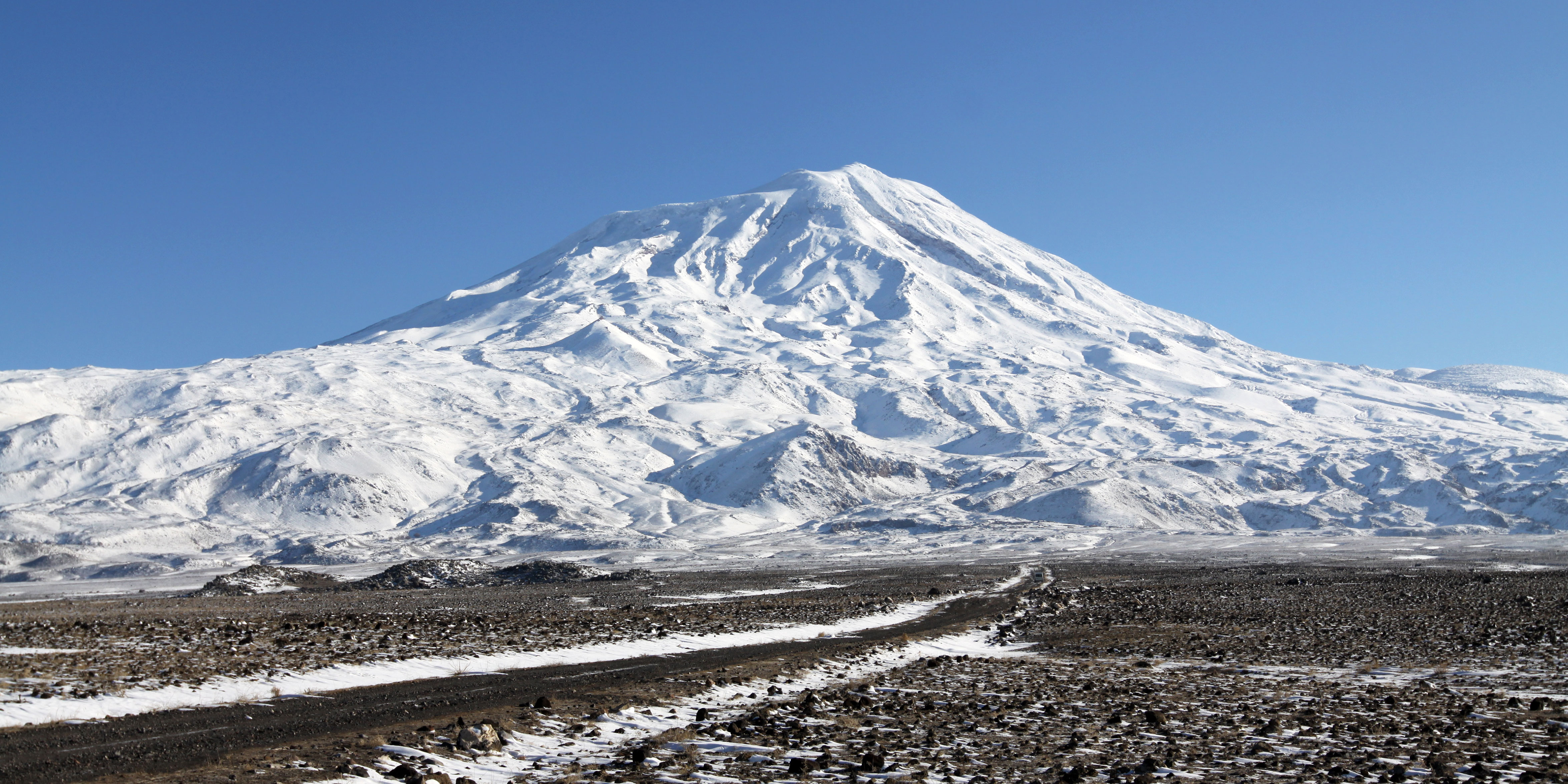
Mount Ararat

The region encompasses most of Western Armenia and had a large population of indigenous Armenians until the Armenian genocide. The Anatolia peninsula historically never encompassed what is now called "Eastern Anatolia" which was, instead, referred to as the Armenian highlands. The term "Armenia" was banned by Ottoman authorities in the 1880s, and the region was officially renamed "Eastern Anatolia" by the Turkish successor state in the 1920s. This has been characterized as an attempt by Turkey to erase the Armenian history of the region. The region has the highest average altitude, largest geographical area, and lowest population density of the seven Turkish regions.

== Etymology ==
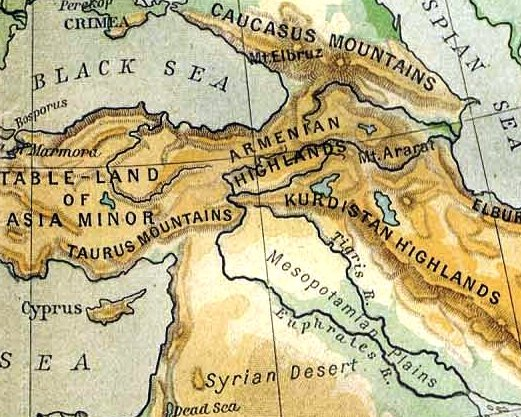
Following the Armenian genocide and establishment of the Republic of Turkey, the territory known as the Armenian Highlands (or Western Armenia) were renamed "Eastern Anatolia" by the Turkish government.

The English-language name Anatolia (Turkish: Anadolu) derives from the Greek Ἀνατολή (Anatolḗ) meaning "the East" and designating (from a Greek point of view) eastern regions in general. Traditionally, Anatolia was considered to be a peninsula the eastern boundary of which was a line from the Black Sea to the Gulf of Alexandretta, which is to the west of what is now the Eastern Anatolia Region. As a geographical term, this definition continues to be used.

Historically, the region was referred to as the Armenian highlands or Western Armenia. In 1923, the newly founded Republic of Turkey renamed the territory "Eastern Anatolia" as part of a wider policy of removing all non-Turkish names of places following the Armenian genocide. Beginning in 1880, the name Armenia was forbidden to be used in official documents of the Ottoman Empire, in an attempt to play down the role of Armenians in the region. The government of Sultan Abdul Hamid II replaced the name Armenia with such terms as "Kurdistan" or "Anatolia". The Sublime Porte believed there would be no Armenian question if there was no Armenia. The process of "nationalization" of toponyms was continued and gained momentum under the Kemalists after the foundation of the Republic of Turkey.

The region encompasses most of Western Armenia (Armenian: Արեւմտյան Հայաստան) and had a large population of indigenous Armenians until the Armenian genocide. The Anatolia peninsula never encompassed what is now called "Eastern Anatolia", which has been seen as an attempt by Turkey to erase the Armenian history of the region.

== Subdivision ==
Eastern Anatolia Region has four subdivisions:

- Upper Euphrates division (Turkish: Yukarı Fırat Bölümü)
- Erzurum-Kars division (Turkish: Erzurum-Kars Bölümü)
- Upper Murat-Van division (Turkish: Yukarı Murat-Van Bölümü)
- Hakkari division (Turkish: Hakkari Bölümü)

== Provinces ==
Provinces that are entirely in the Eastern Anatolia Region:

- Ağrı
- Bingöl
- Bitlis
- Elazığ
- Malatya
- Hakkari
- Iğdır
- Kars
- Muş
- Tunceli
- Van

Provinces that are mostly in the Eastern Anatolia Region:

- Ardahan
- Erzincan
- Erzurum
- Şırnak

== Location and borders ==
The Eastern Anatolia Region is located in the easternmost part of Turkey. It is bounded by Turkey's Central Anatolia Region to the west; Turkey's Black Sea Region to the north; Turkey's Southeast Anatolia Region and Iraq to the south; and Iran, Azerbaijan, Armenia and Georgia to the east, where Eastern Anatolia overlaps and converges with the South Caucasus region and Lesser Caucasus mountain plateau.

The area of the region is 164,330 km^{2} (63,450 sq mi), which comprises 20.9% of the total area of Turkey.

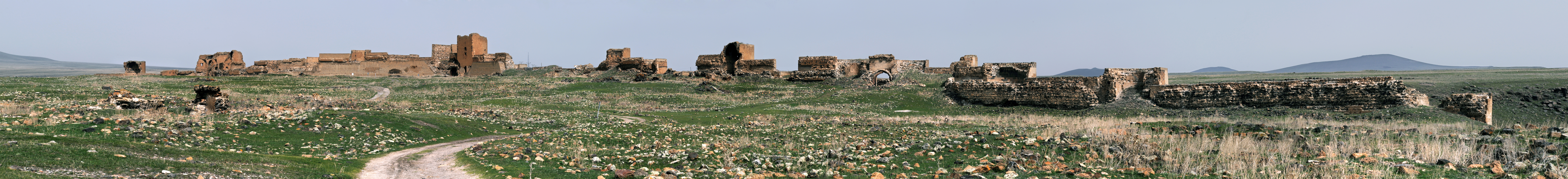
Panoramic view of Ani in Kars

== Economy ==
Eastern Anatolia has long remained on the poorer side of Turkey's east–west divide, with lower incomes, productivity and industrialization than western regions. Agriculture and livestock remain particularly important, while private investment and non-agricultural employment have been limited. In the late Ottoman period, the region had a diverse economy in which Armenians were prominent in agriculture, crafts, manufacturing and commerce alongside other communities. The Armenian genocide transformed this economy through mass killing and deportation and the confiscation of Armenian farms, homes, businesses and other property. Redistribution of this property to the state, Muslim settlers and local elites reshaped regional ownership and contributed to the creation of a Muslim-Turkish national economy. Kemalist governments expanded infrastructure, services and development programs, but eastern provinces continued to lag in human capital, investment and employment.

From the 1980s, the Turkish–PKK conflict further disrupted rural production through insecurity, displacement and the evacuation or destruction of settlements. These upheavals reinforced migration toward regional cities and western Turkey, contributing to rural depopulation and urban displacement.

== Pilgrimage by Armenians ==
Armenian sometimes travel to the region —the ancestral homeland of Armenians, often called the "old country" in Armenian (Ergir or Yergir) or Western Armenia—is frequently described as roots tourism, pilgrimage, or homecoming rather than conventional leisure travel. Visitors seek ancestral villages, houses, cemeteries, churches, monasteries, and landscapes associated with families displaced during the Armenian genocide. Such connections are made through prayer, photographs, touching buildings, collecting soil or stones, and encounters with familiar foods and landscapes.

These journeys confront visitors with ruined, transformed, or repurposed Armenian heritage. As a result of the Armenian genocide, villages and houses have disappeared, Armenian place-names have often been replaced, and surviving churches and monasteries can become the principal remaining markers of former Armenian settlement. Restoration and "faith tourism" have preserved certain buildings while presenting them chiefly as tourist attractions and reducing or obscuring their Armenian religious identity. Sociologist Defne Över has reported that Armenian visitors who have attempted to pray outside the authorized service at the Armenian cathedral at Akhtamar were reminded by a guard that they were "only tourists."

Access to Western Armenia has also been shaped by legal, geographical, and security barriers. During the Soviet era, ordinary Armenia–Turkey travel was severely restricted; Turkey blockaded Eastern Armenia by closing land borders in 1993, and Armenian citizens later faced additional visa requirements, although direct air travel resumed in the 2000s. Diaspora Armenians using other passports can generally travel legally, but remote terrain, changed place-names, vanished settlements, difficult roads, and periods of armed conflict make organized tours particularly important. Anti-Armenian sentiment in Turkey also affects how openly visitors express Armenian identity; on some tours, pilgrims have been advised not to speak Armenian. The resulting journeys constitute a form of return in which ancestral places become physically accessible while remaining politically, materially, and socially transformed.

== Demographics ==
The total population of the region is 5,966,101 (2019 estimate), down from 6,100,000 at the 2000 census. The population density (40 inhabitants per square kilometre (100/sq mi)) is lower than the average for Turkey (98/km^{2} (250/sq mi)). The region has the second most rural population in Turkey after the Black Sea region. Migration, especially to Marmara Region, is high. Migration to other regions and abroad is higher than the natural population increase. Until the Armenian genocide, the region also had a large population of indigenous Armenians, when it was also known as Western Armenia, and in addition had significant minorities of Georgians, Pontic Greeks and Caucasus Greeks.

== Geography ==
The average altitude is 2,200 m (7,200 ft). Major geographic features include plains, plateaus and massifs. There is some volcanic activity today.

=== Lakes and rivers ===
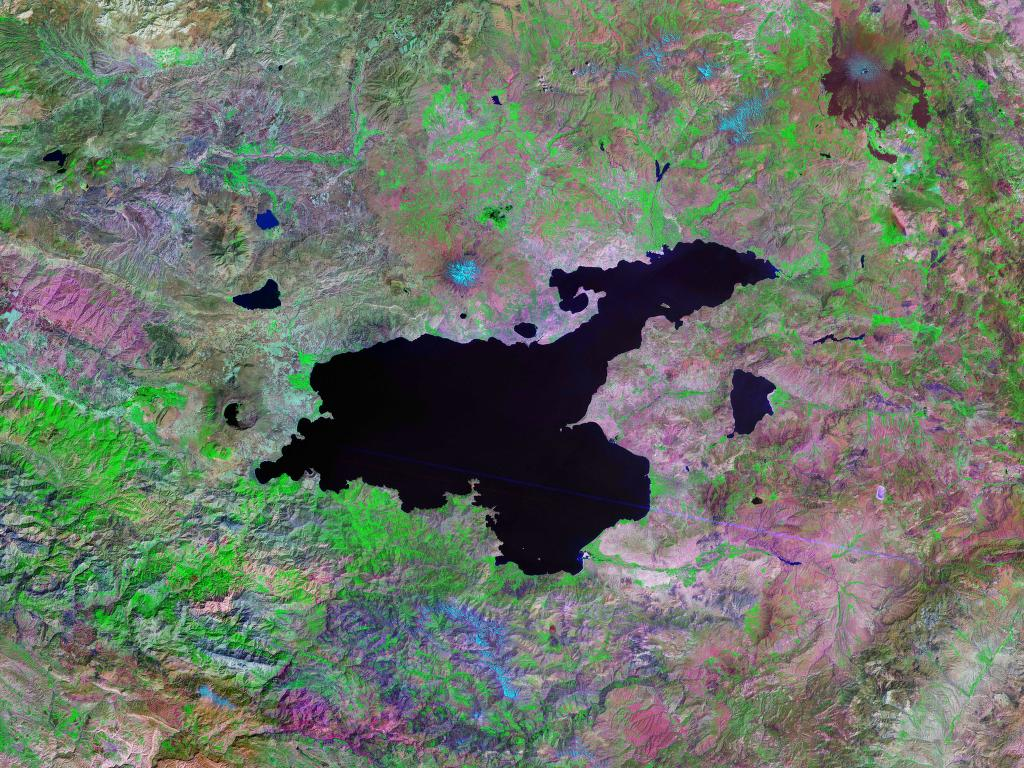
Lakes near Lake Van.
- Located in the Eastern Anatolia Region Aras and Kura rivers flooded the shed outside the territory of Turkey to the Caspian Sea. Euphrates, the Tigris and the Zab river waters are poured back onto the Persian Gulf Turkey outside.
- The regime of the streams of the region is irregular. This is because; the irregularity of the precipitation regime and the fall of winter precipitation in the form of snow. As the snow falls on the ground for a long time without melting, the flow rates of the rivers decrease. The snow melting in spring and summer causes streams to increase their flow rates and flow enthusiastically. On the other hand, the rivers of the region have high hydroelectric energy potential. The reason for this is that it has high elevations and slopes.
- Lakes were formed on the fault lines throughout the region. Turkey's largest lake, Lake Van along with Lake Çıldır, Lake Nazik, Lake Erçek, Lake Hazar, Lake Balık, Lake Haçlı and Lake Akdoğan are located within the region.

=== Massifs and mountains ===
- There are three massif lines running north–south:
  - To the north, the Çimen Dağı, Kop Dağı and Yalnızçam mountains, Allahuekber Mountains, Aras Mountains and Mount Ararat.
  - In the centre, the Munzur, Karasu Dağı, Aras Dağı, Bingöl Mountains and Akdoğan mountains.
  - To the south, Southeast Tauros; Karaçavuş Mountains, Bitlis, Hakkâri, and Buzul mountains.
- The volcanic mountains Nemrut, Süphan, Tendürek and Ararat are in the region.

=== Plateaus and plains ===
- The largest plateau in the region is Erzurum-Kars Plato.
- The region includes the Malatya, Elazığ, Bingöl, Muş plains and the Van Lake basin.
- The largest plain in the region is the Iğdır Plain. The second largest plain is the Muş Plain.

=== Lakes ===
- Lake Balık
- Lake Bulanık
- Lake Çıldır
- Lake Erçek
- Lake Hazar
- Lake Kuyucuk
- Lake Nazik
- Lake Van, the largest of Turkey
- Lake Gerendal
- Lake Karagöl
- Lake Bahri
- Lake Aygır (Erzurum)
- Lake Aygır (Kars)

=== Rivers ===
- Euphrates
- Tigris
- Aras River
- Kura (Caspian Sea)
- Zab River

== Climate and nature ==
Erzurum

Climate chart (precipitation, max. and min. temperature)
J	F	M	A	M	J	J	A	S	O	N	D
20 −4 −15	24 −3 −14	33 3 −7	58 12 0	70 17 4	43 22 7	27 27 10	16 28 10	21 23 5	49 15 1	33 7 −5	22 −1 −11
- █ Average max. and min. temperatures in °C
- █ Precipitation totals in mm
- Source: Turkish State Meteorology
Imperial conversion
J	F	M	A	M	J	J	A	S	O	N	D
0.8 25 5	0.9 27 7	1.3 37 19	2.3 54 32	2.8 63 39	1.7 72 45	1.1 81 50	0.6 82 50	0.8 73 41	1.9 59 34	1.3 45 23	0.9 30 12
- █ Average max. and min. temperatures in °F
- █ Precipitation totals in inches

Since most of the region is far from the sea, and has high altitude, it has a harsh continental climate with long winters and short summers. During the winter, it is very cold and snowy, during summer the weather is cool in the highlands and warm in the lowlands.

The region's annual temperature difference is the highest in Turkey. Some areas in the region have different microclimates. As an example, Iğdır (near Mount Ararat) has a milder climate.

The region contains 11% percent of the total forested area of Turkey, and it is rich in native plants and animals. Oak and yellow pine trees form the majority of the forests.

The region has high potential for hydroelectric power.

== Gallery ==
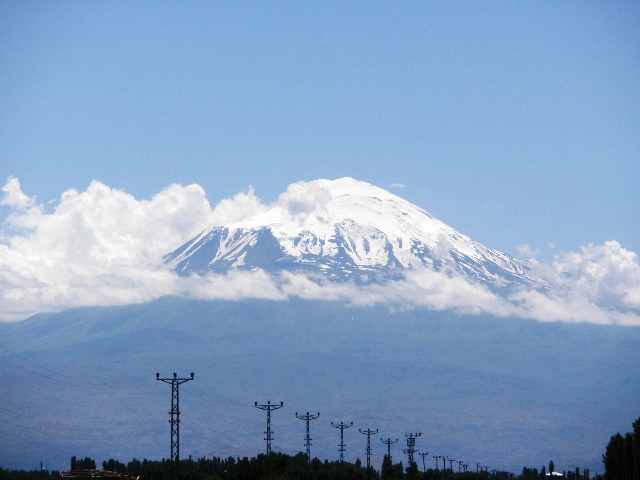
View of Mount Ararat (Ağrı in Turkish) from Iğdır

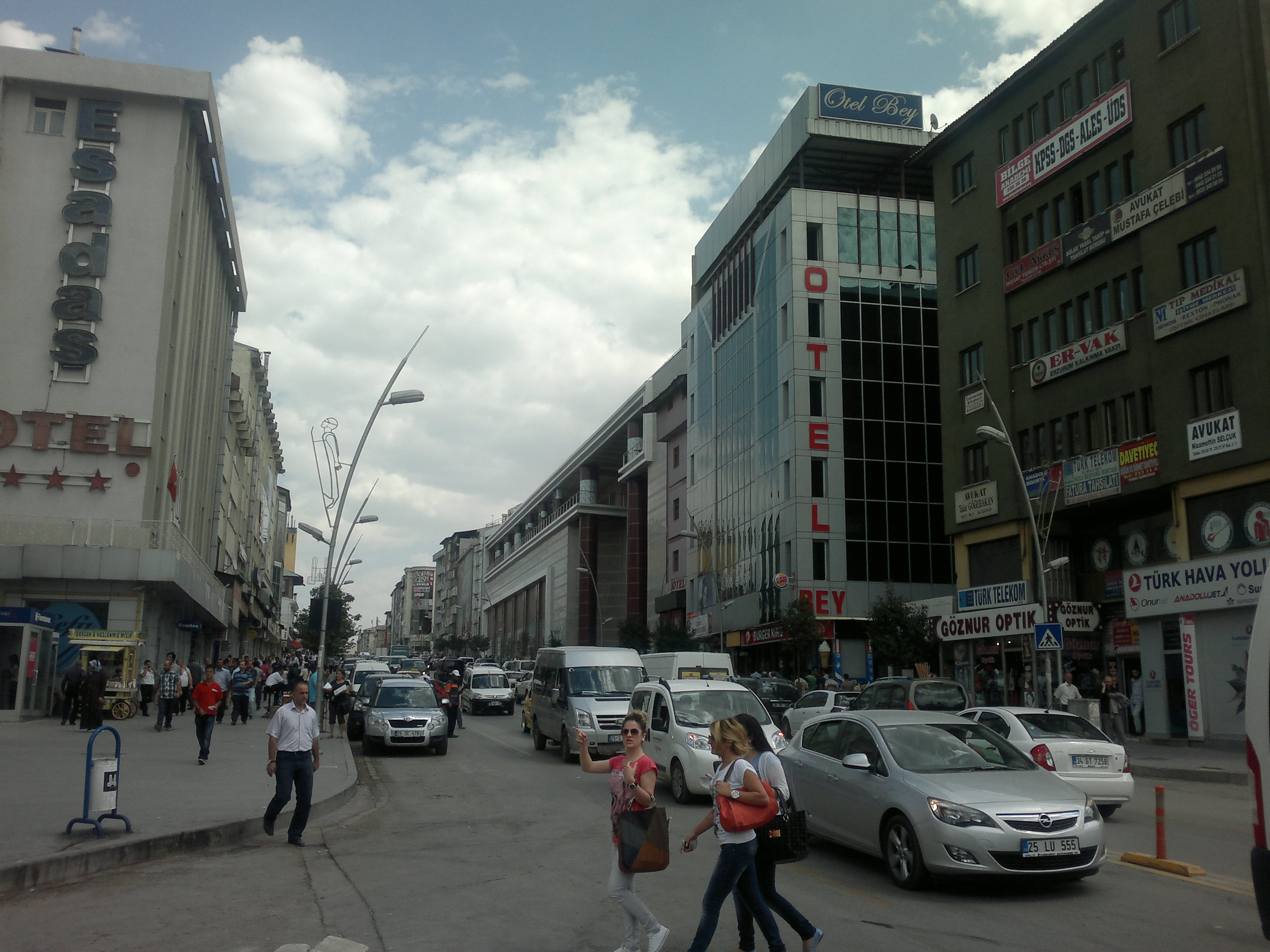
Cumhuriyet Avenue in Erzurum

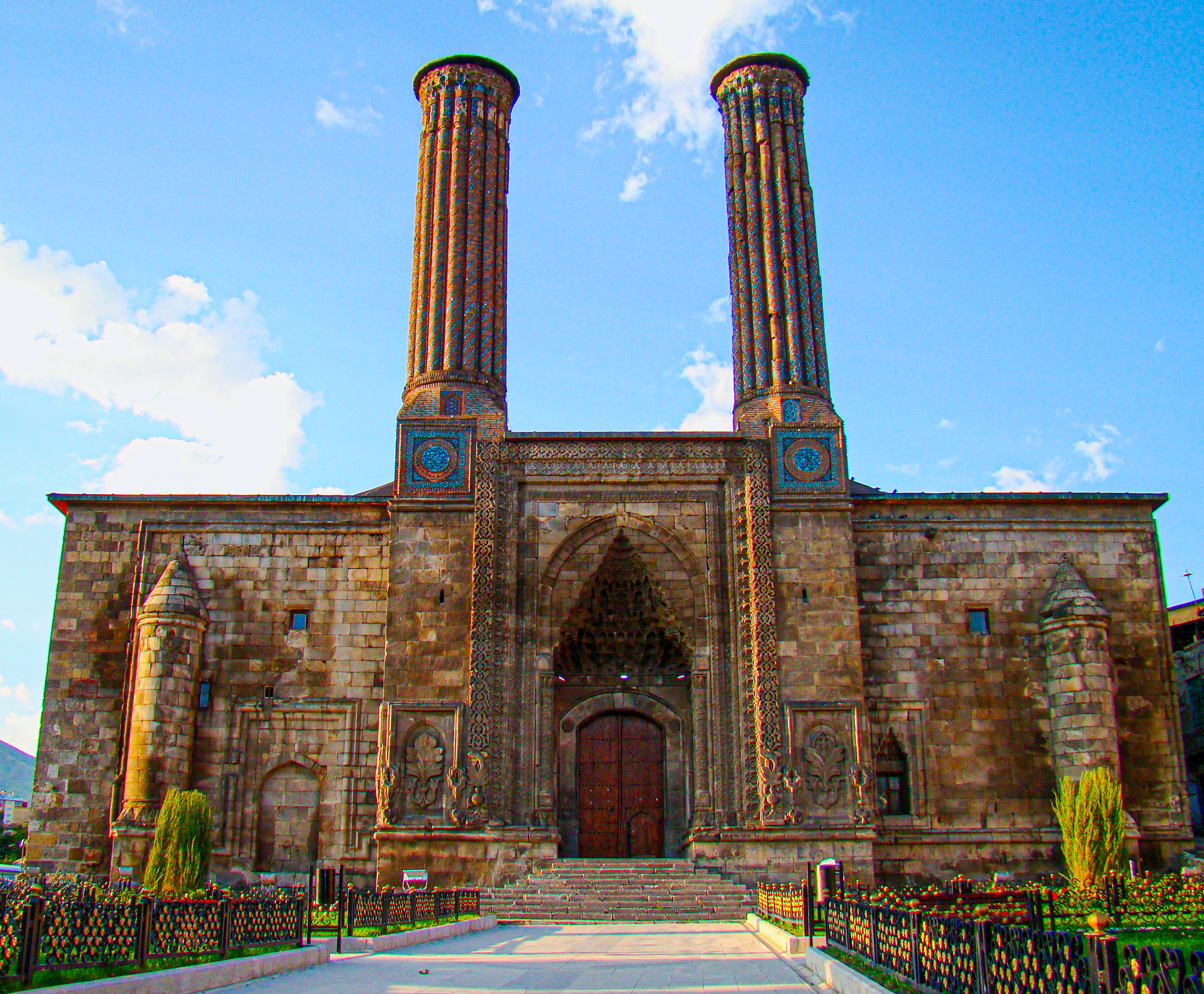
The 13th-century Çifte Minareli Medrese is an architectural monument of the late Seljuk period in the city of Erzurum

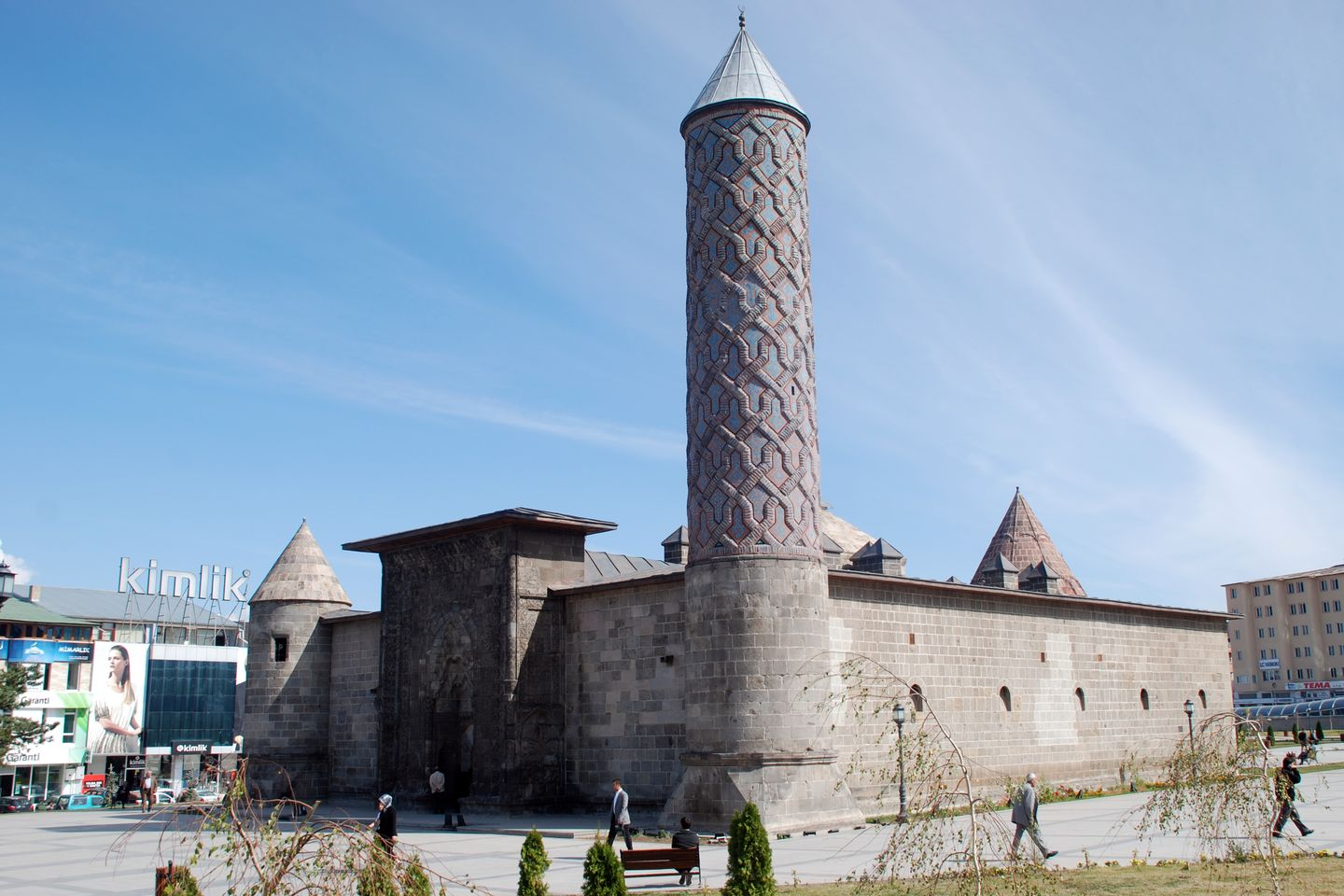
The 14th-century Yakutiye Medresesi in Erzurum

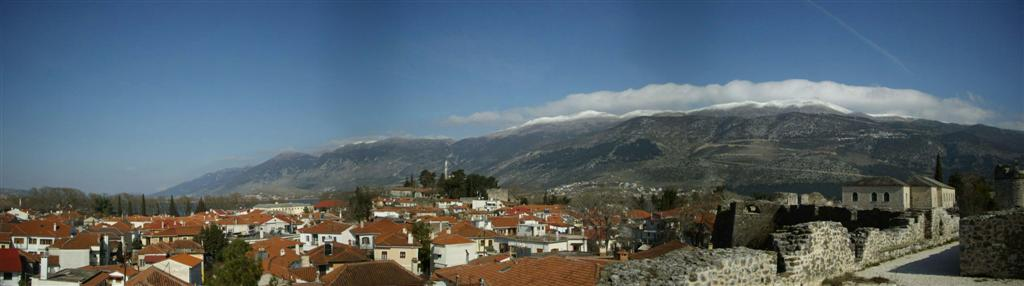
Panoramic view of the city of Bingöl

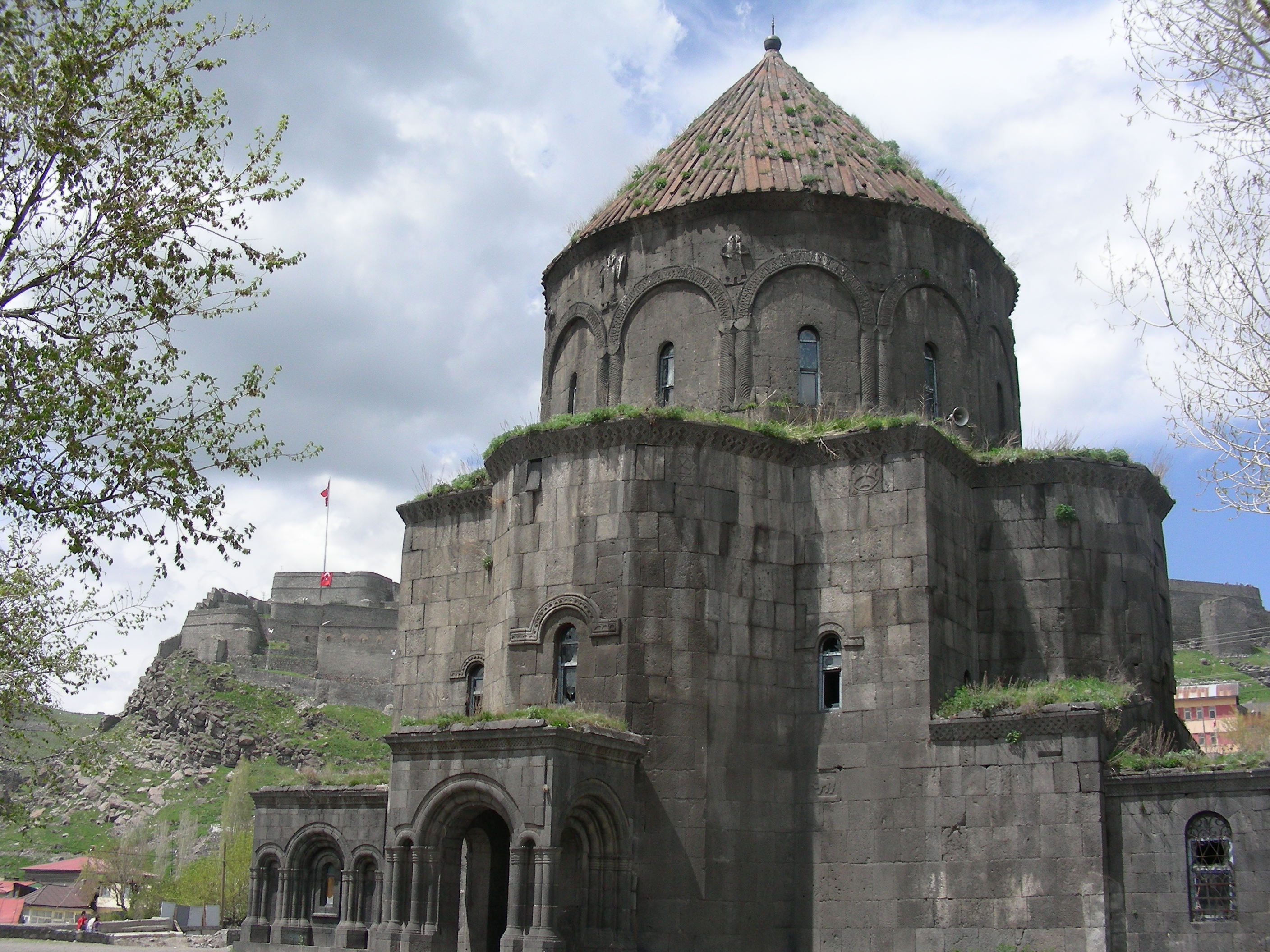
The 10th-century Armenian Church of the Holy Apostles, with the Castle of Kars in the background

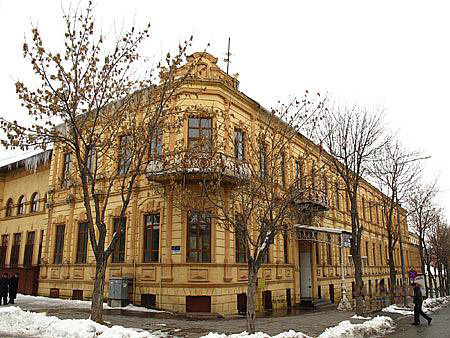
Kars city centre

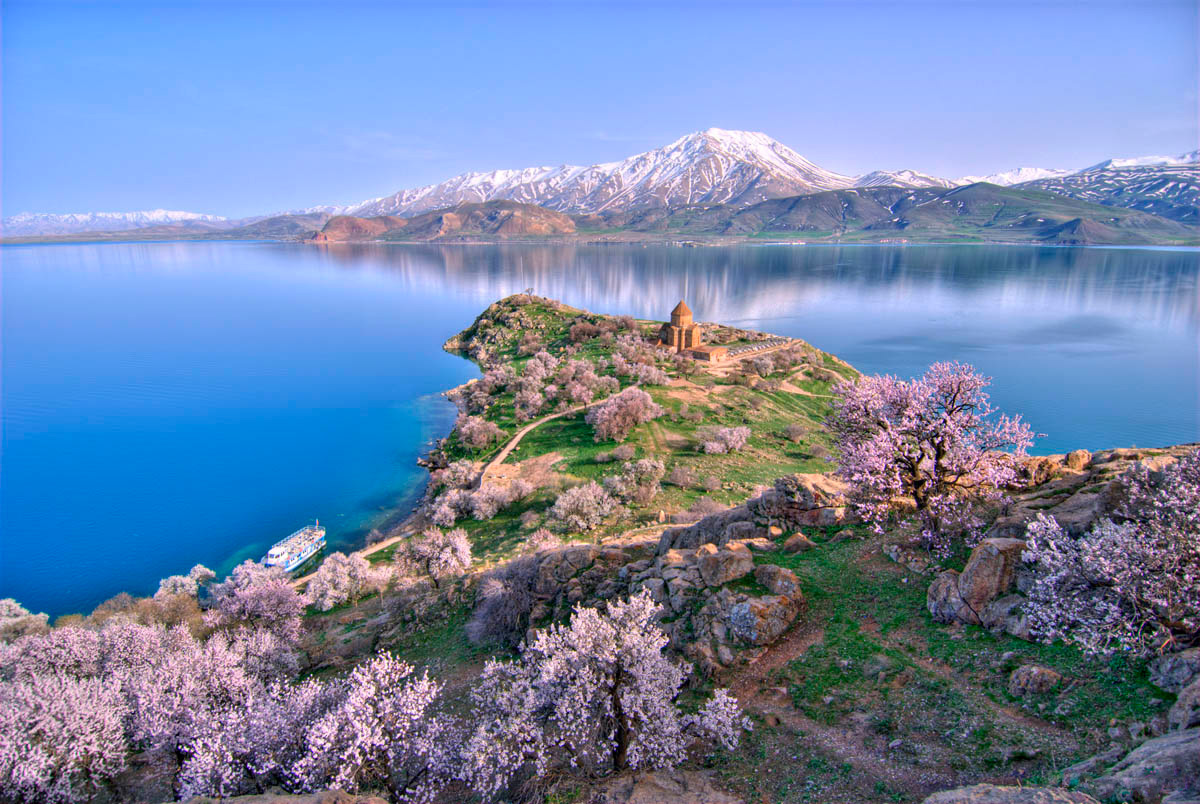
Akdamar Island and the Armenian Cathedral of the Holy Cross, a 10th-century Armenian church and monastic complex

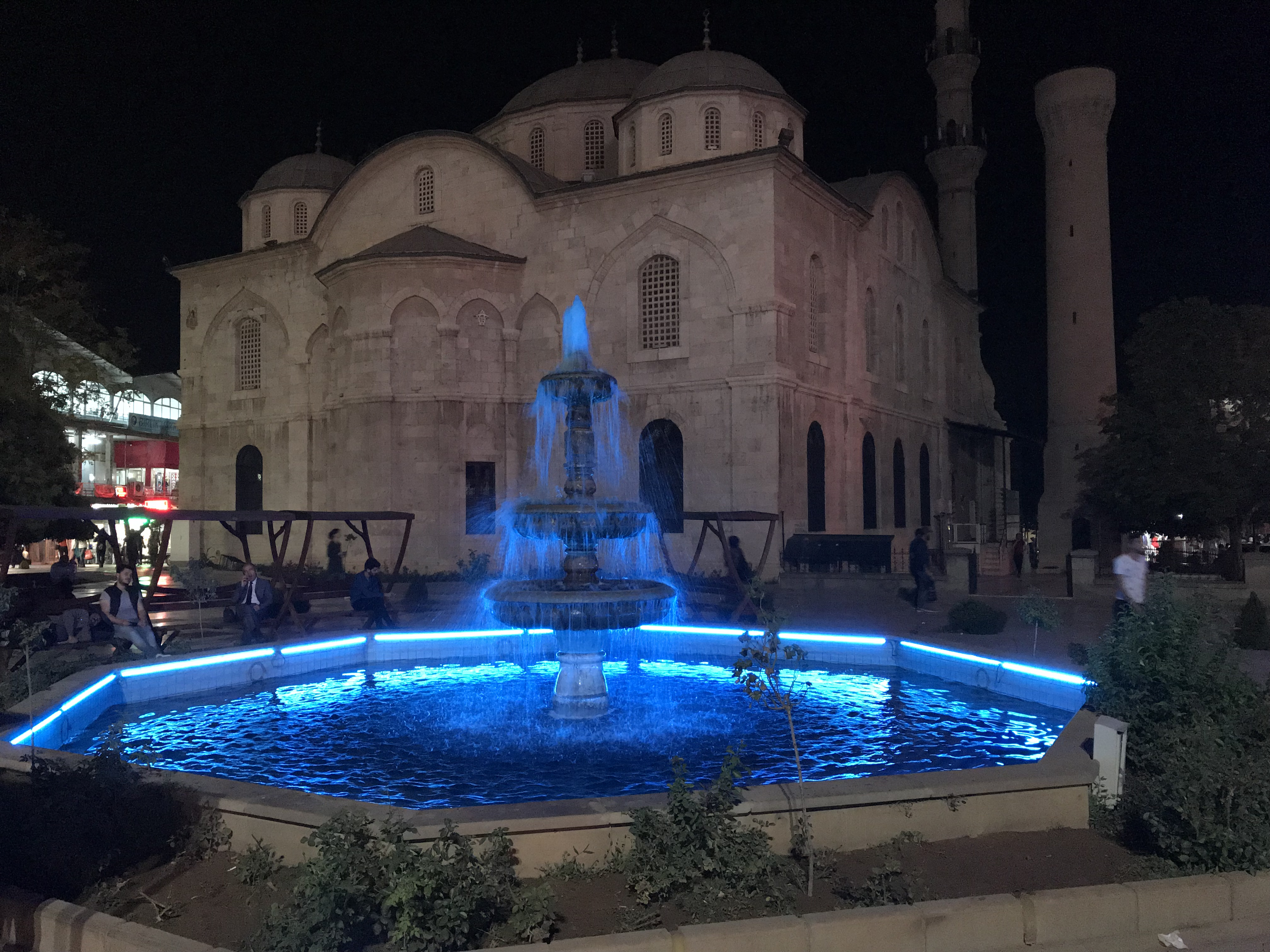
Ottoman era Yeni (New) Mosque in Malatya

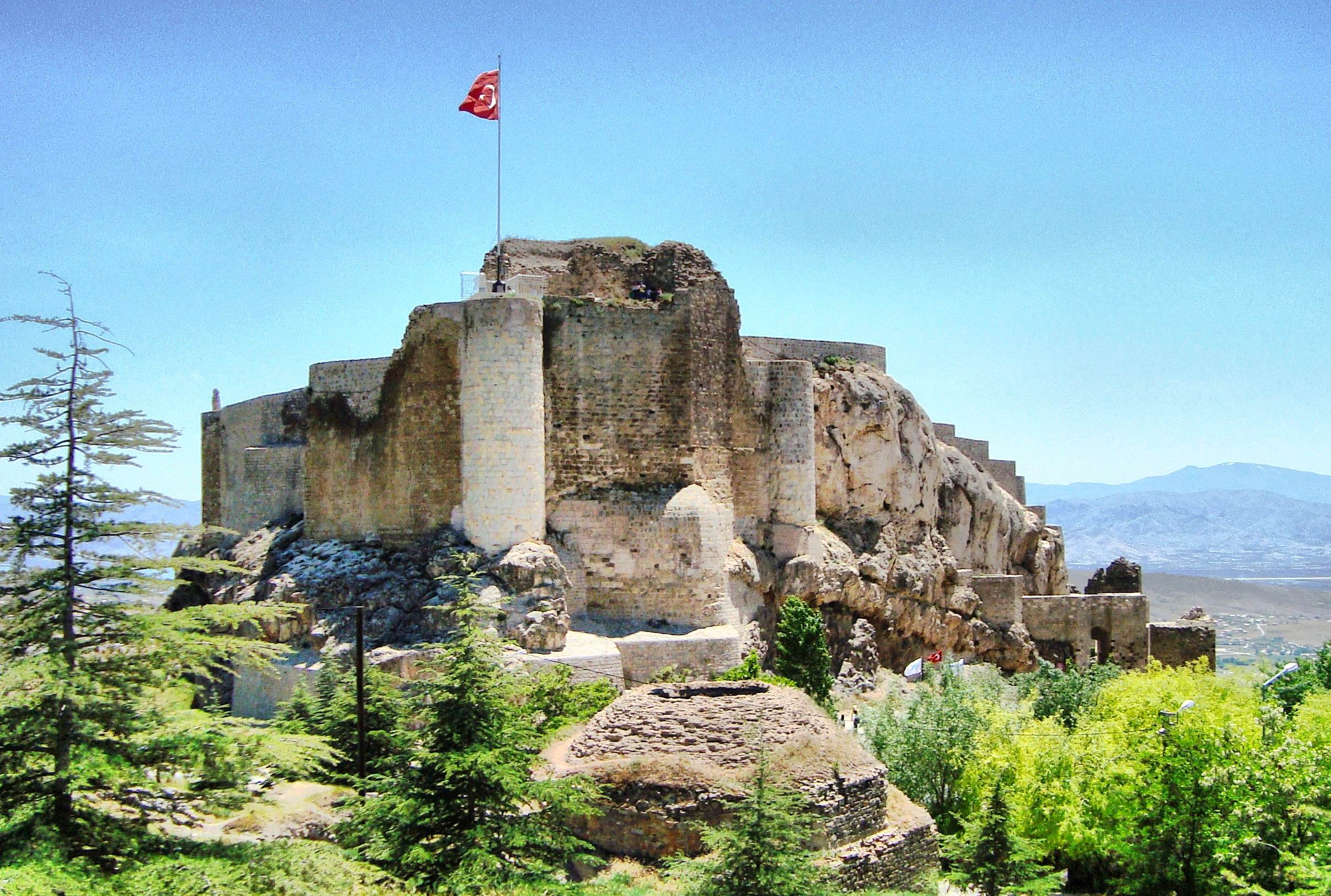
Harput Castle in Harput
