= Güllüce, Patnos =

Güllüce
- Village
- Location in Turkey
- Coordinates: 39°08′18″N 42°54′42″E
- Country: Turkey
- Province: Ağrı
- District: Patnos
- Elevation: 1,816 m (5,958 ft)
- Population (2023): 232
- Time zone: UTC+3 (TRT)
- Postal code: 04502
- Area code: 0472

Güllüce is a village in the Patnos District of Ağrı Province, Turkey. The village was formerly known as Ğûlice according to records from 1925. The village is located 97 km from Ağrı city center and 17 km from the district center of Patnos.

== Population ==
Historical population
Year	Pop.	±% p.a.
1965	186	—
1985	308	+2.55%
1990	344	+2.24%
1997	363	+0.77%
2007	398	+0.92%
2012	364	−1.77%
2017	348	−0.89%
2023	232	−6.53%
Source: Population censuses (1965-1997) and TÜİK (2007-2023)
