= Muş Plain =

Plain in the eastern Turkey

Coordinates: 38.78°N 41.55°E

The Muş Plain (Turkish: Muş Ovası; Kurdish: Deşta Mûşe; Armenian: Մշոյ դաշտ), is located in the northeast of the city center of Muş. It is one of the largest plains in Turkey. At the eastern end of the plain is the İron Sazlığı wetland and Mount Nemrut. The plain is largely an agricultural area.

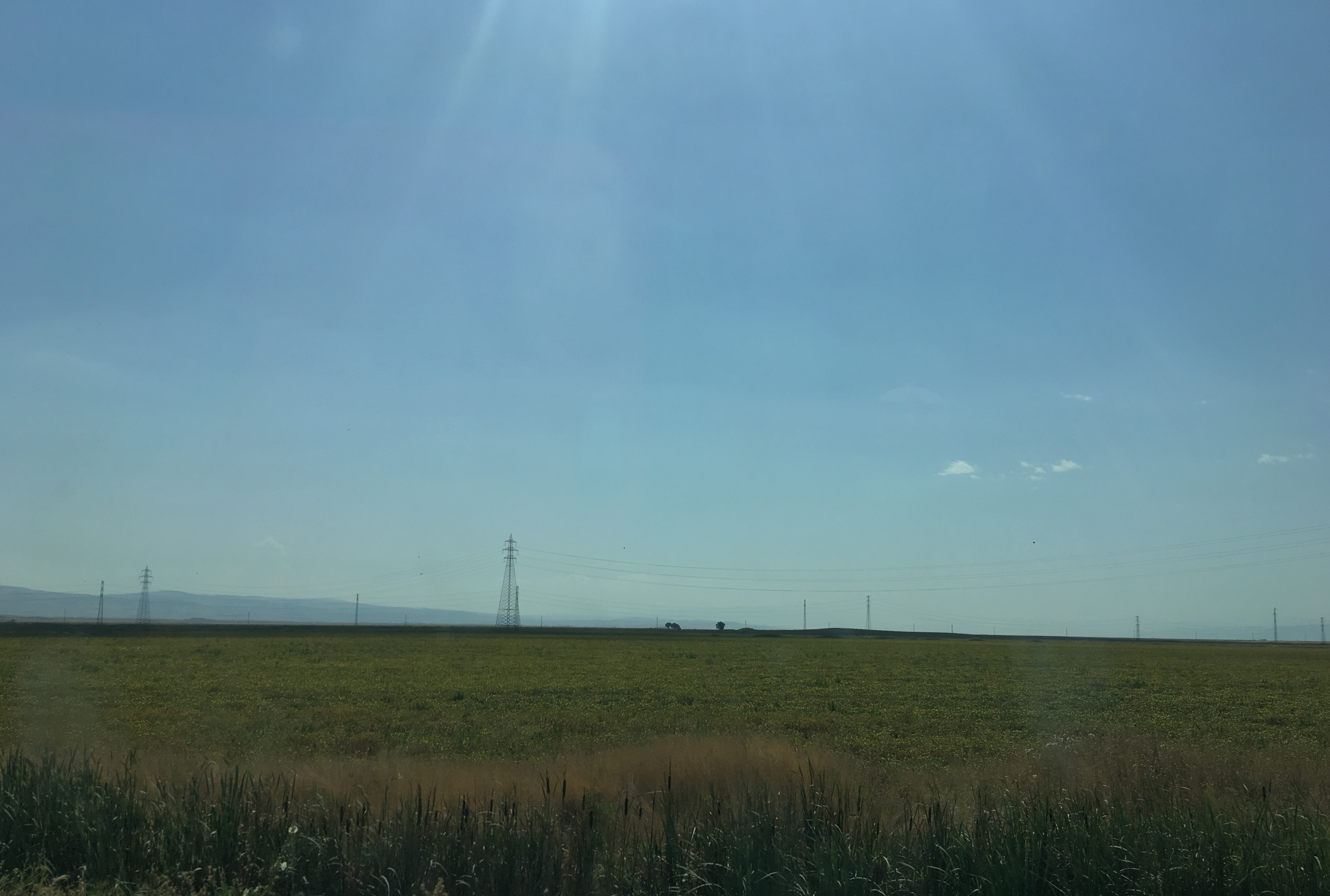
Muş Plain

== Geology and geomorphology ==
Muş plain is the second largest plain in the Eastern Anatolia region after Iğdır Plain. The plain is surrounded by Şerafettin, Otluk Mountains and Yakupağa Mountains, which have a northeast southwest extension. Between these two mountain ranges, the Murat river enters the plain. The plain is surrounded by Karaçavuş Mountains and Bitlis Mountains from the south. The Karasu river, which comes out of the foothills of Mount Süphan, crosses the plain in the middle and merges with the Murat River near the western part.

=== Flora ===
A representative plant species of Muş province is Tulipa aleppensis, which is only found on cultivated land.
