= Governor of Muş =

Governor of a Turkish Province

Governor of Muş Muş Valiliği
- Logo of the Governor of Muş
- Incumbent; Avni Çakır since August 18, 2023
- Appointer: President of Turkey; On the recommendation of the Turkish government
- Term length: No set term length or limit
- Inaugural holder: Mithat İzzet Saylam; 1932
- Website: Office of the Governor

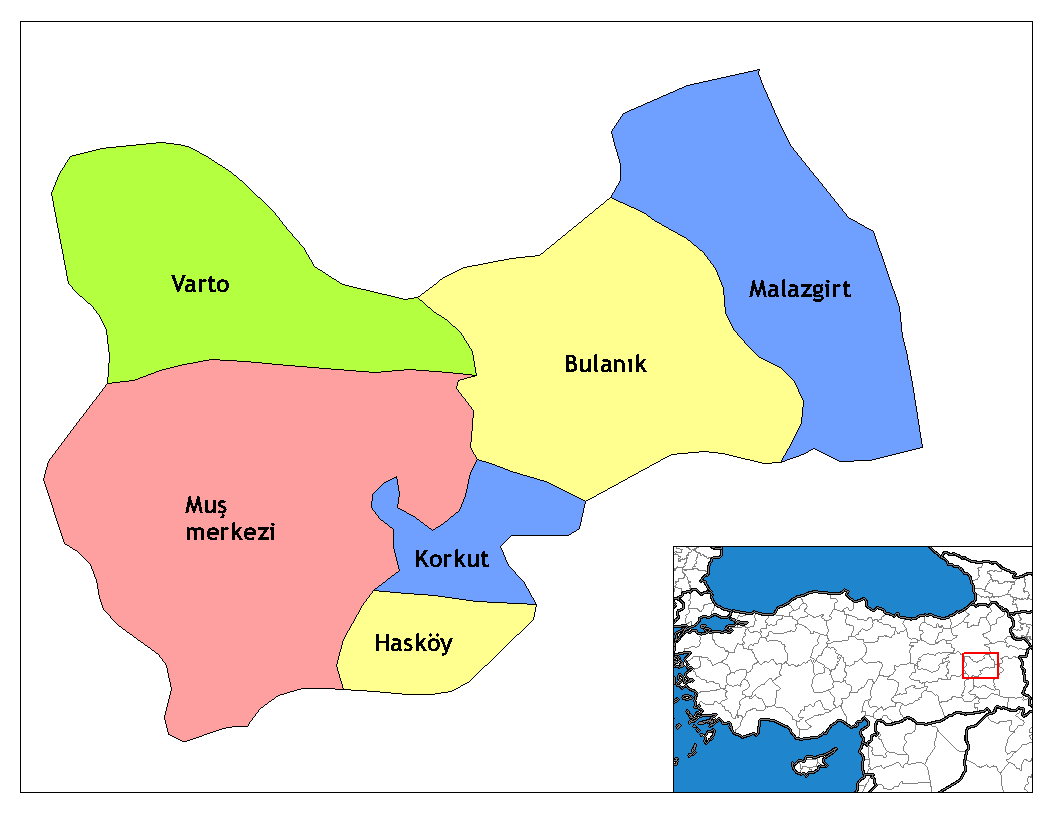
Map of the Province of Muş, showing the provincial districts.

The Governor of Muş (Turkish: Muş Valiliği) is the bureaucratic state official responsible for both national government and state affairs in the Province of Muş. Similar to the Governors of the 80 other Provinces of Turkey, the Governor of Muş is appointed by the Government of Turkey and is responsible for the implementation of government legislation within Muş. The Governor is also the most senior commander of both the Muş provincial police force and the Muş Gendarmerie.

== Appointment ==
The Governor of Muş is appointed by the President of Turkey, who confirms the appointment after recommendation from the Turkish Government. The Ministry of the Interior first considers and puts forward possible candidates for approval by the cabinet. The Governor of Muş is therefore not a directly elected position and instead functions as the most senior civil servant in the province of Muş.

=== Term limits ===
The Governor is not limited by any term limits and does not serve for a set length of time. Instead, the Governor serves at the pleasure of the Government, which can appoint or reposition the Governor whenever it sees fit. Such decisions are again made by the cabinet of Turkey. The Governor of Muş, as a civil servant, may not have any close connections or prior experience in Muş Province. It is not unusual for Governors to alternate between several different Provinces during their bureaucratic career.

== Functions ==
The Governor of Muş has both bureaucratic functions and influence over local government. The main role of the Governor is to oversee the implementation of decisions by government ministries, constitutional requirements and legislation passed by Grand National Assembly within the provincial borders. The Governor also has the power to reassign, remove or appoint officials a certain number of public offices and has the right to alter the role of certain public institutions if they see fit. Governors are also the most senior public official within the Province, meaning that they preside over any public ceremonies or provincial celebrations being held due to a national holiday. As the commander of the provincial police and Gendarmerie forces, the Governor can also take decisions designed to limit civil disobedience and preserve public order. Although mayors of municipalities and councillors are elected during local elections, the Governor has the right to re-organise or to inspect the proceedings of local government despite being an unelected position.

== List of governors of Muş ==
- Ferruh Bey (1929–1931)
- Zeynel Abidin Özmen (1931–1933)
- Ahmet Mithat Kalabalık (1933–1936)
- Ahmet Niyazi Mergen (1936–1937)
- Tevfik Sırrı Gür (1937–1943)
- Feyyaz Bosut (1943–1944)
- Ziya Kasnakoğlu (1944–1947)
- Ahmet Demir (1947–1949)
- Fevzi Karakülah (1949–1951)
- Ahmet Gümüşlü (1951–1953)
- Atıf Ulusoğlu (1953–1955)
- Hadi Ömür (1955–1957)
- Niyazi Toker (1957–1960)
- Sait Kemalî Atay (1960–1961)
- Ahmet Sadullah Verel (1961–1964)
- Mehmet Aldan (1964–1966)
- Ali Rıza Yaradanakul (1966–1968)
- Ertuğrul Süer (1968–1971)
- Mustafa Kemal Demirtaş (1971–1973)
- Sabahattin Çakmakoğlu (1973–1975)
- Fikret Turgut Sayın (1975–1978)
- Yılmaz Ergun (1978–1979)
- Kenan Güven (1979–1981)
- Hasan Bamyacı (1981–1984)
- Yalçın Küçük (1984–1988)
- Aykut Ozan (1988–1991)
- Necati Develioğlu (1991–1993)
- Aslan Yıldırım (1993–1996)
- Süleyman Kamçı (1996–1999)
- Zeki Şanal (1999–2002)
- Dr. Cengiz Akın (2003–2004)
- Ali Yıldırım Kartal (2004–2008)
- Erdoğan Bektaş (2008–2010)
- Ali Çınar (2011–2013)
- Vedat Büyükersoy (2013–2015)
- Seddar Yavuz (2015–2017)
- Aziz Yıldırım (2017–2018)
- Doç. Dr. İlker Gündüzöz (2018–2023)
- Avni Çakır (2023–)

== See also ==
- Governor (Turkey)
- Muş Province
- Ministry of the Interior (Turkey)
