= Michael Apokapes =

Duke of Edessa

Michael Apokapes (also known as Abu K’ab or Aboukab) was doux of Edessa under the Byzantine Emperor Michael IV the Paphlagonian (r. 1034–1041). A member of the Apokapes family, he was the father of Basil Apokapes. Michael Apokapes was served by Eustathios Boilas for fifteen years.

== Sources ==
- Madgearu, Alexandru (2013). Byzantine Military Organization on the Danube, 10th-12th Centuries. Brill. p. 73. ISBN 9789004252493.
- Oikonomides, Nikolas (1991). "Boilas, Will of Eustathios". In Kazhdan, Alexander (ed.). The Oxford Dictionary of Byzantium. Oxford and New York: Oxford University Press. ISBN 0-19-504652-8.
- Rotman, Youval (2009). Todd, Jane Marie (ed.). Byzantine Slavery and the Mediterranean World. Harvard University Press. p. 128. ISBN 978-0674036116.
