= Çifte Minareli Medrese, Erzurum =

Madrasa in Erzurum, Turkey

Çifte Minareli Medrese
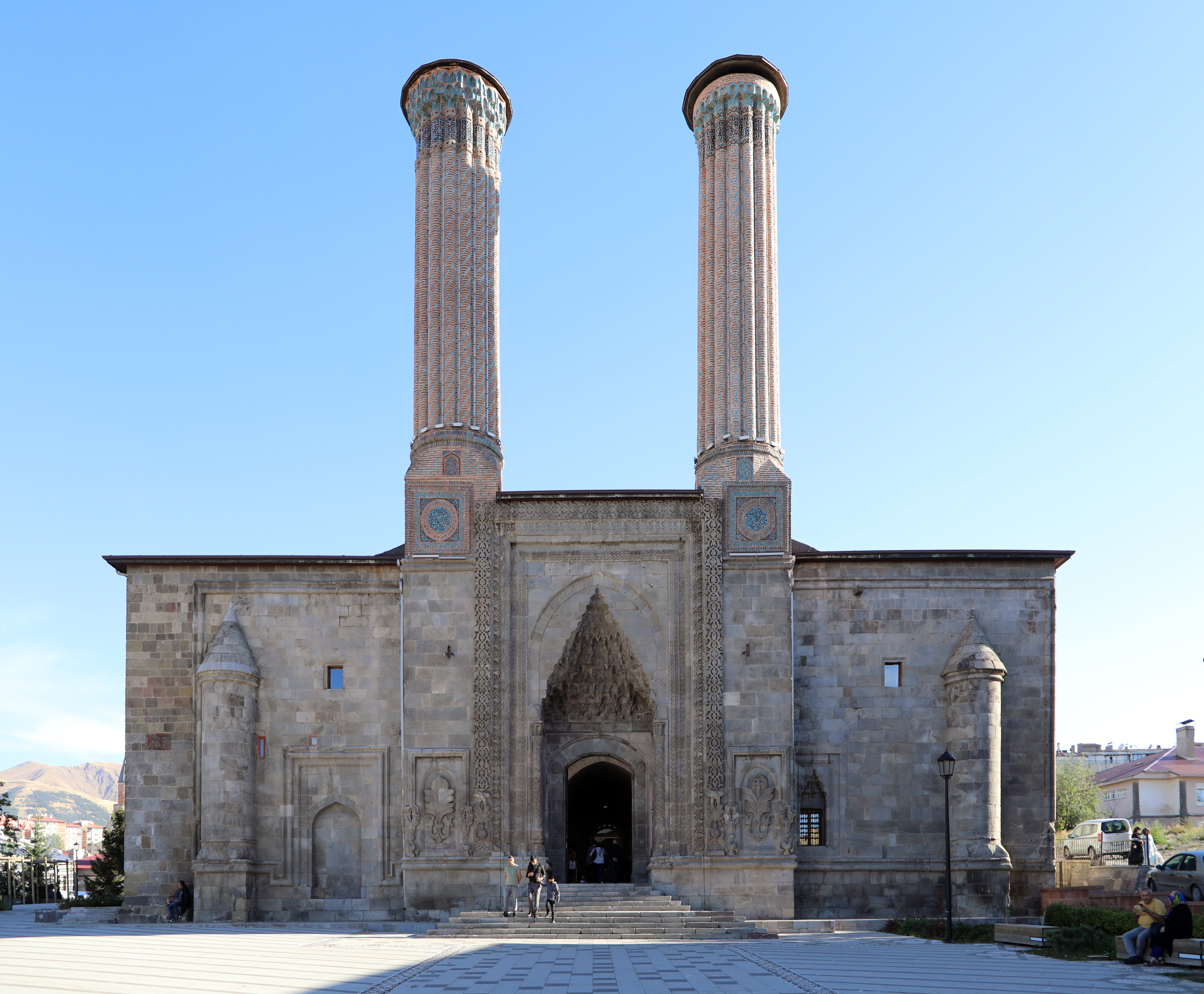
- Twin Minaret Madrasa - Erzurum

Religion
- Affiliation: Islam
- District: Erzurum
- Province: Erzurum
- Region: East Anatolia

Location
- Location: Erzurum, Turkey
- Interactive map of Çifte Minareli Medrese
- Coordinates: 39.9056°N 41.2784°E

Architecture
- Type: Madrasa
- Style: Seljuk
- Completed: 1265
- Minaret: 2

Twin Minaret Medrese (Persian: مدرسه اسلامی جفت مناره) is an architectural monument of the late Seljuk period in Erzurum City, Erzurum Province, Turkey. Built as a theological school a few years before 1265, it takes its name, Twin Minaret Madrasa, from the two fluted minarets that crown the monumental façade.

== History ==
The Twin Minaret Medrese is thought to be the model for the Gök Medrese in Sivas. According to the inscription on the portal, it was built in 1271 by Khudavand Khatun, the daughter of Seljuq Sultan Kayqubad I. The madrasa probably had an impact on the Buruciye Madrasa too.

The east entrance of the madrasa and the enormous stone facade of ornamental brick and tile masonry with two minarets are remarkable works of art.

On each side of the entrance there is a panel. The right side is decorated with a double-headed eagle. The motif on the left side does not seem to be completed.

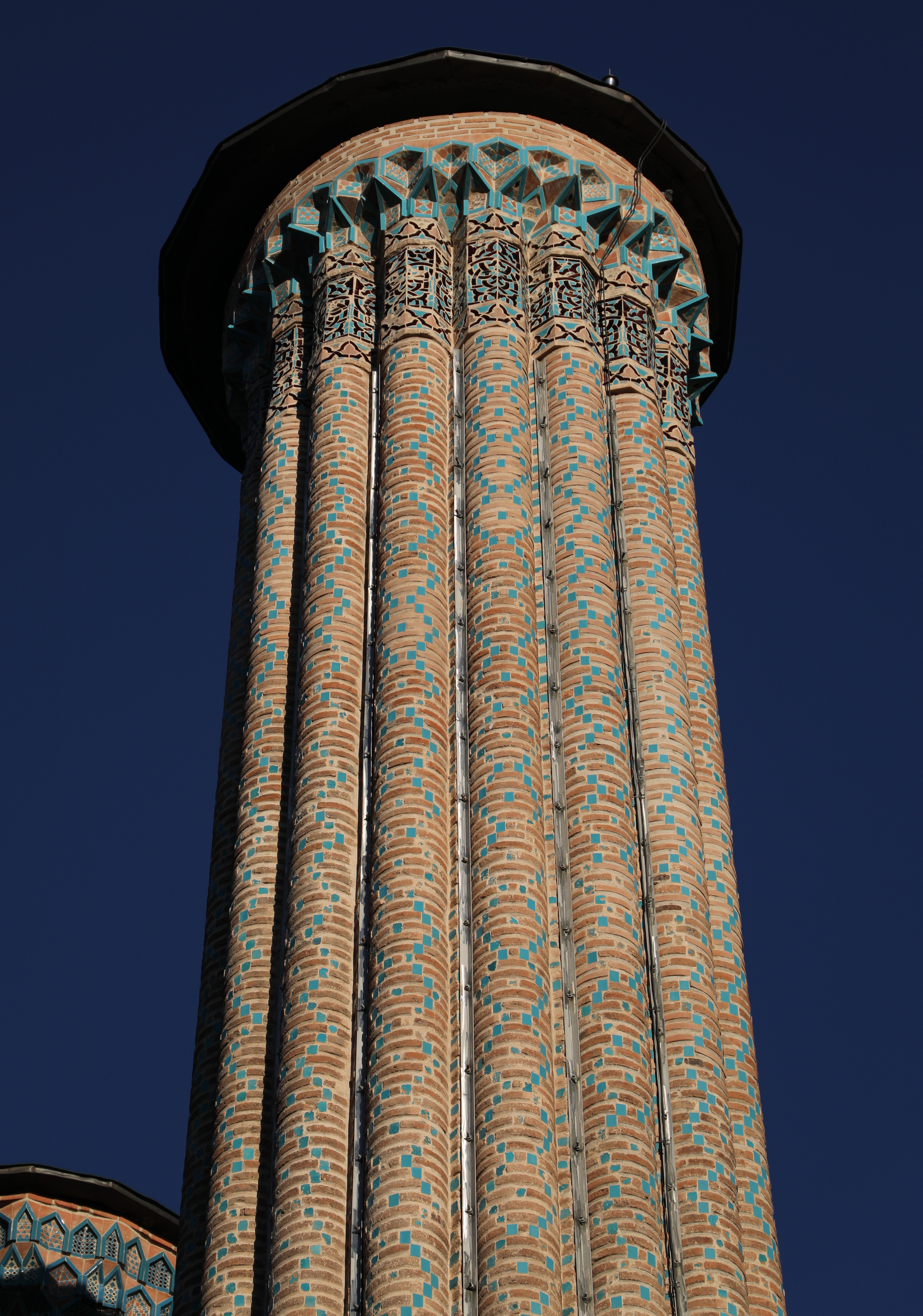
Ceramic decoration on one of the minarets

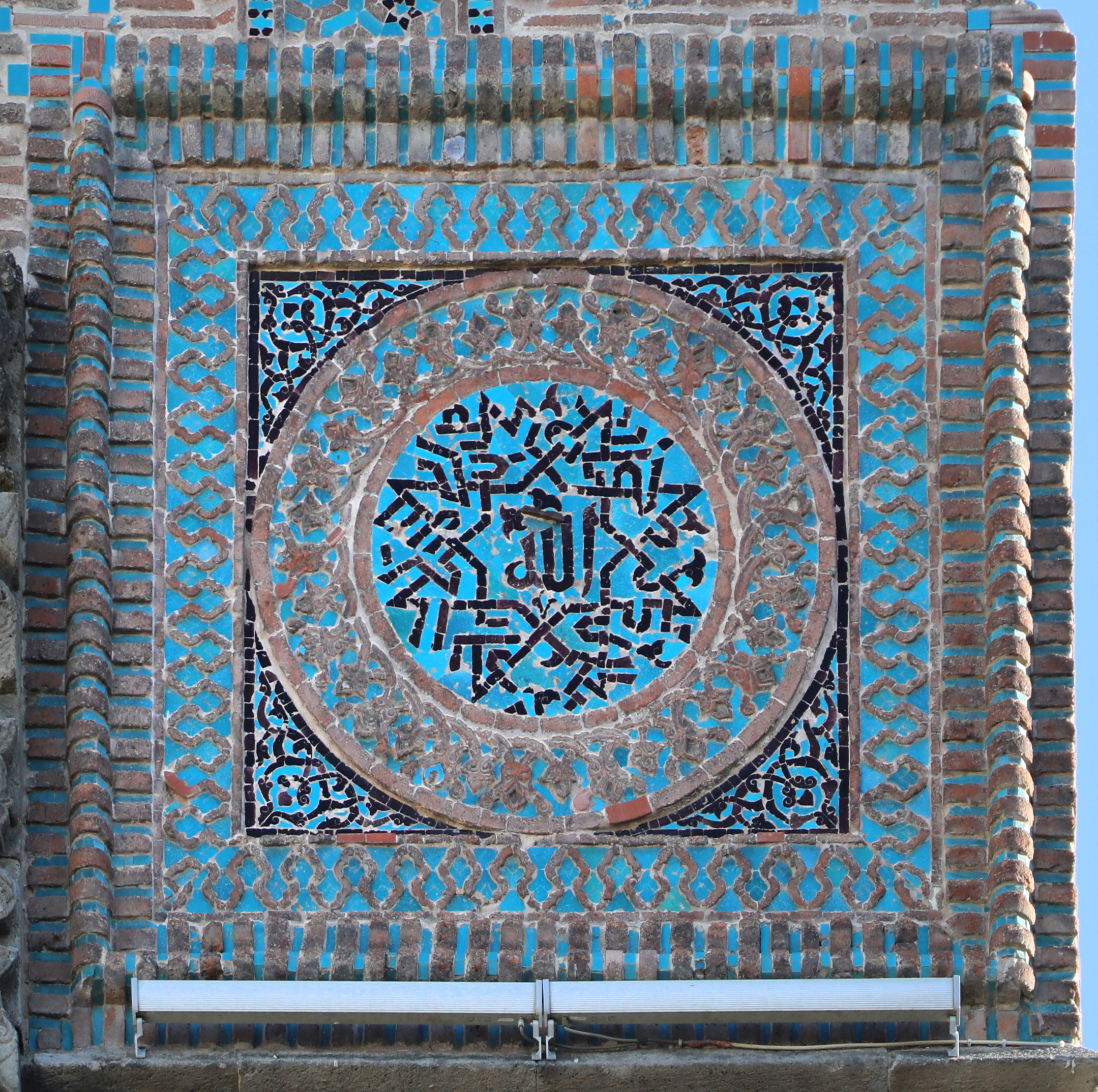
Ceramic decoration in sufic scripts

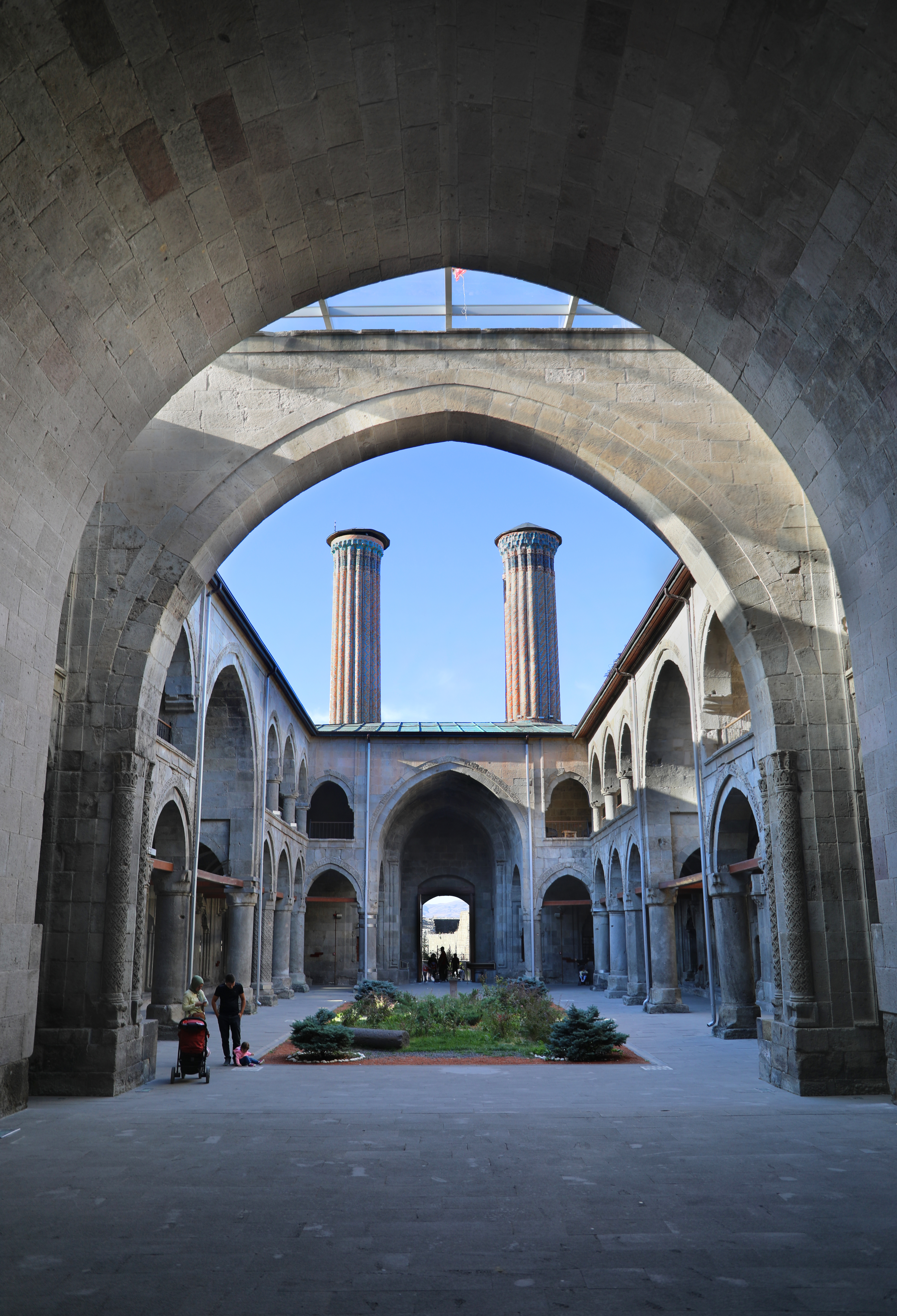
Courtyard

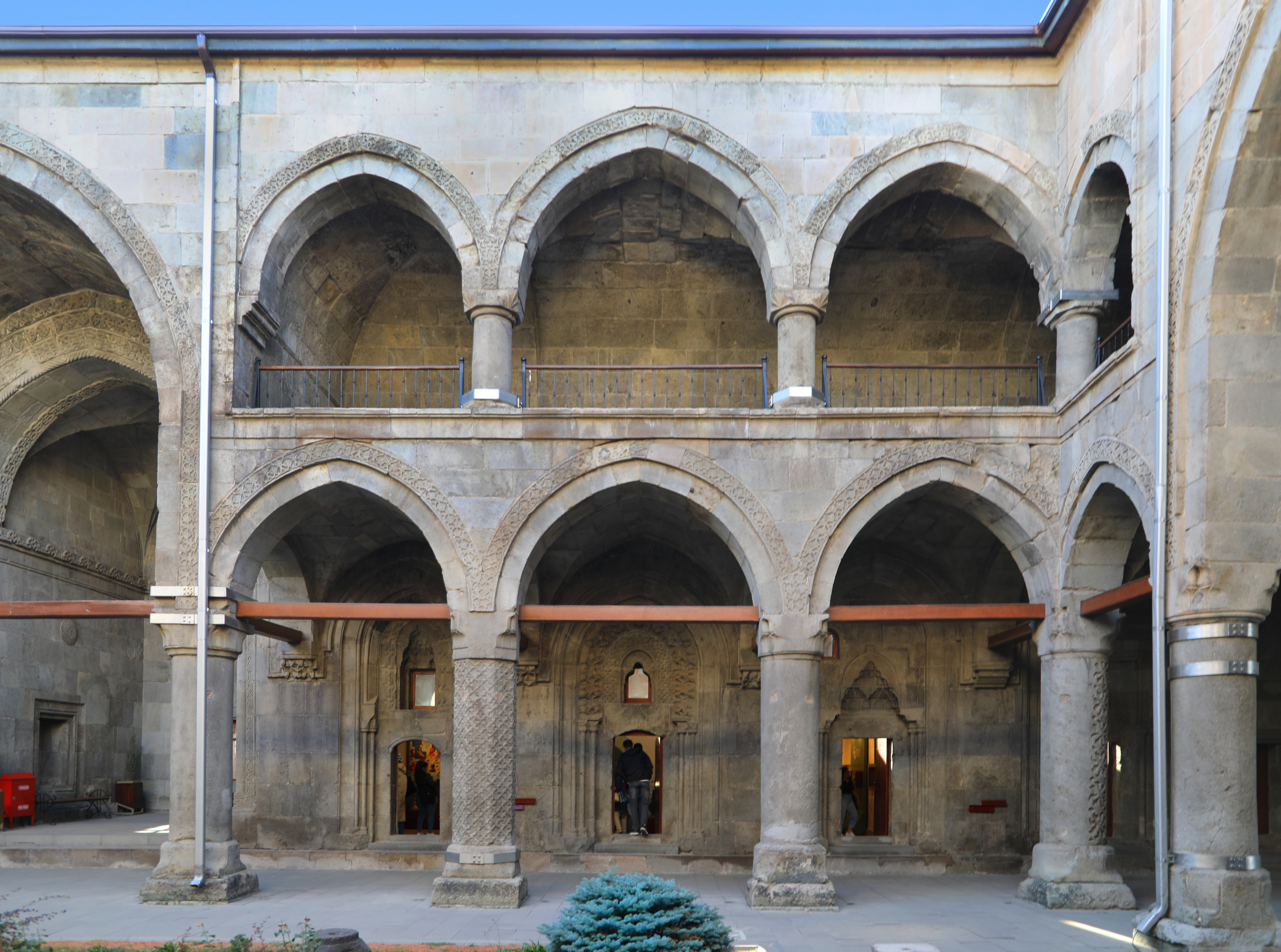
Arcades in the courtyard

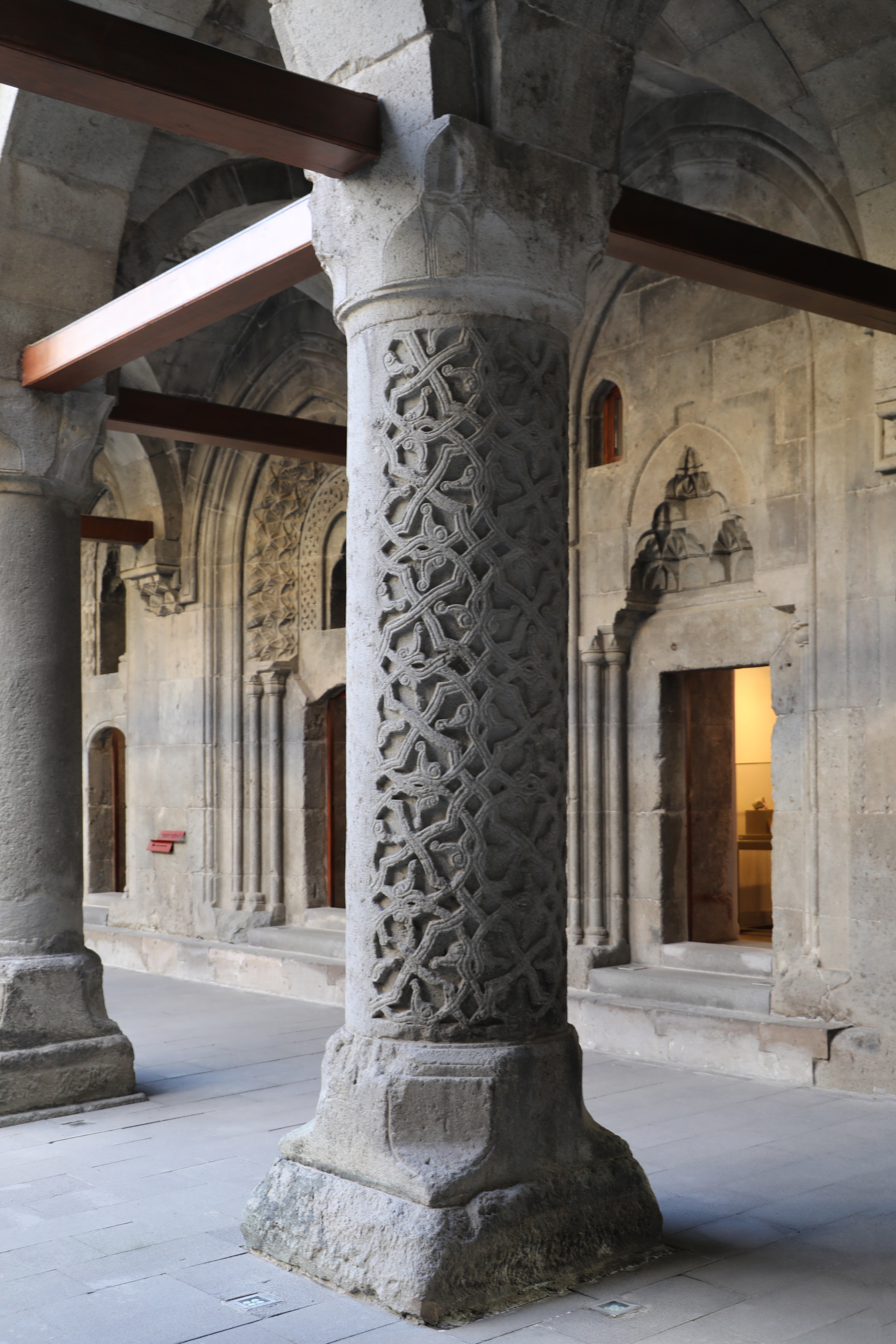
Carved column in the courtyard

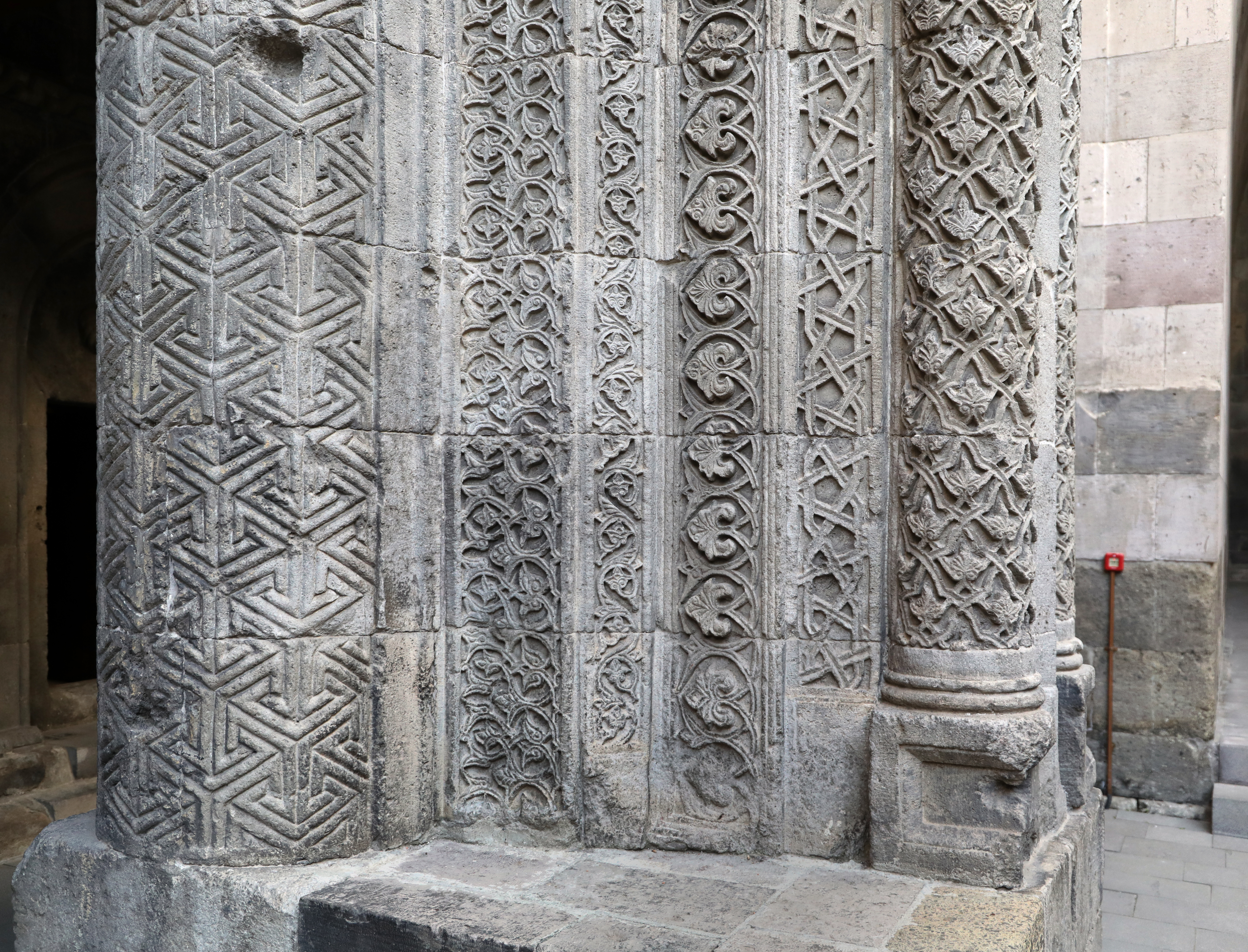
Decorations in the courtyard

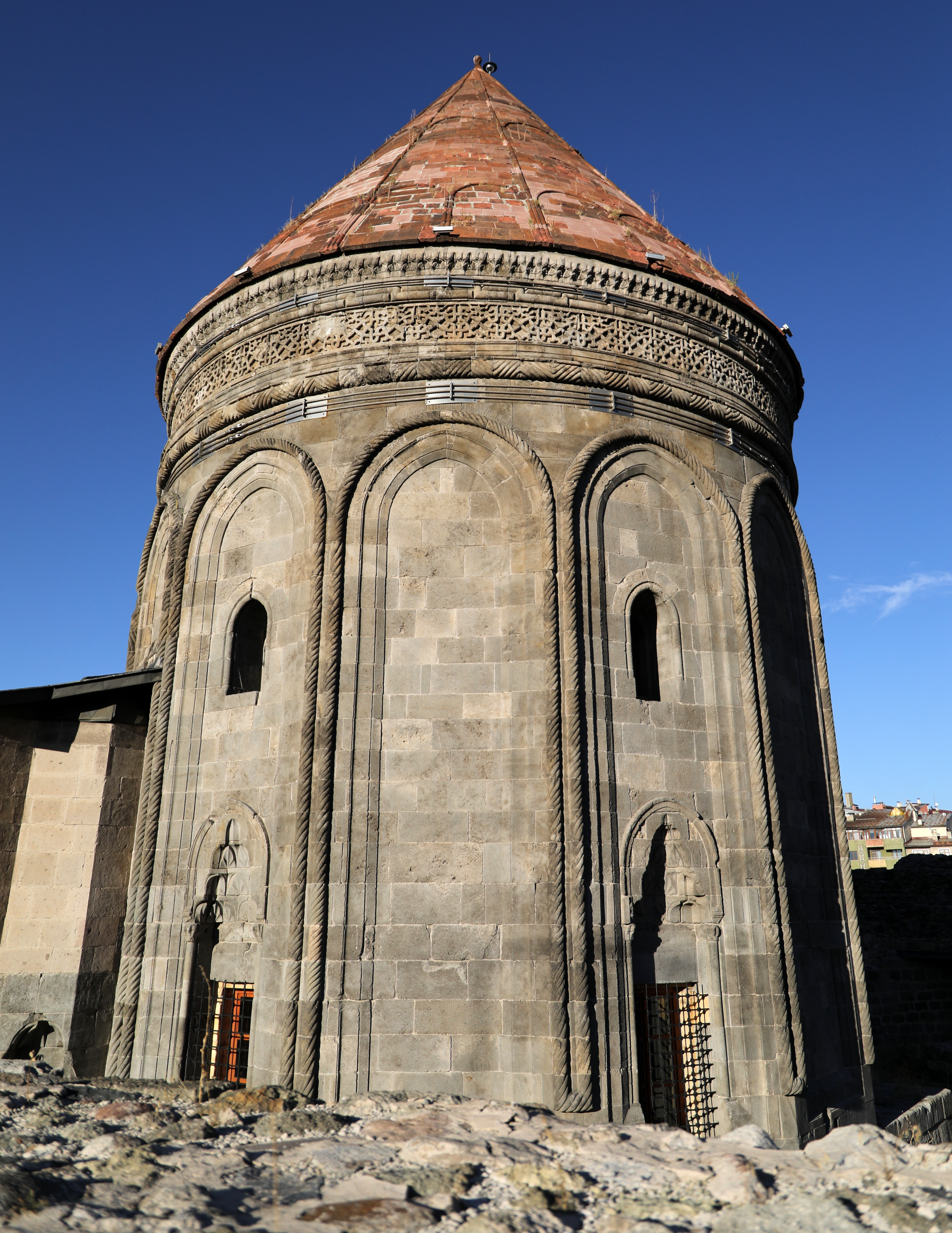
Hatun Huand mausoleum
