= Bilican Mountains =

Mountain range in Turkey

- Location within Turkey

Highest point
- Elevation: 2.950 m (9.68 ft)
- Coordinates: 38°57′02″N 42°11′27″E

Geography
- Location: Bulanık, Muş Province, Turkey

Geology
- Mountain type: Tectonics

Bilican Mountains (Kurdish: Çiyayên Bilêcanê, Turkish: Bilican Dağları) is a mountain range in Turkey, located in the Bulanık district of Muş. It rises at the end of the extension of the Yakupağa Mountains, which is the extension of Süphan Mountain in the east.

== Geology and geomorphology ==
The Bilican mountains are located between Bulanık and Liz plains and are one of the highest mountain ranges in Muş province. They extend to Bulanık city center by descending regularly. There are Göztepe mountain and Akdoğan mountains in the north of the Bilican Mountains.
