= Malazgirt =

- Municipality
- Location within Turkey
- Coordinates: 39°08′52″N 42°32′39″E
- Country: Turkey
- Province: Muş
- District: Malazgirt

Government
  - Mayor: Kenan Türker (DEM)
- Population (2024): 42,135
- Time zone: UTC+3 (TRT)
- Postal code: 49400
- Area code: 0436
- Website: www.malazgirt.bel.tr

Malazgirt (Kurdish: Melezgir; Armenian: Մանազկերտ, romanized: Manazkert; Georgian: მანასკერტი, romanized: Manaskerti; Medieval Greek: Ματζιέρτη, romanized: Matziértē), historically known as Manzikert (Medieval Greek: Μαντζικέρτ), is a town in Muş Province in Turkey. It is the seat of Malazgirt District. In the 2024 Turkish local elections, Ahmet Kenan Türker from the Peoples' Equality and Democracy Party was elected as the mayor. According to the 2024 population census, the district's total population is 42,135. It is mostly populated by Kurds with few Islamized Armenians. It is the site of the 1071 Battle of Manzikert between the Byzantines and Seljuk Turks. In the city, there is the Malazgirt Castle, for which the Byzantine Empire and the Seljuk state fought dozens of times.

== History ==
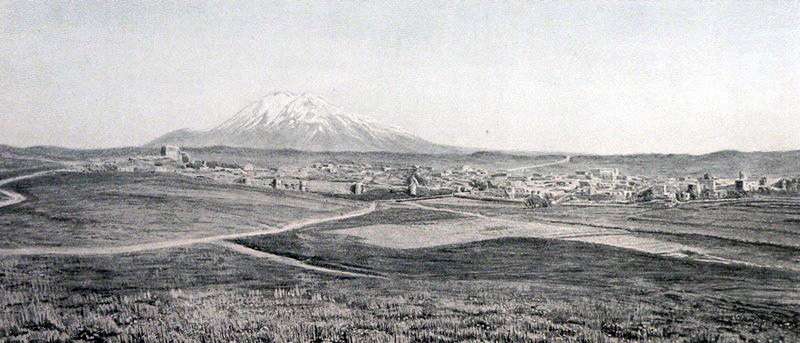
View of the city of Malazgirt and Mount Süphan from the north, 1901

=== Founding ===
The settlement dates to the Iron Age. According to Tadevos Hakobyan it was established during the reign of the Urartian king Menua (r. 810–785 BC). The Armenian name Manazkert is supposedly shortened from Manavazkert (Armenian: Մանավազկերտ), adopted in Greek as Μαντζικέρτ or Ματζιέρτη. The suffix -kert is frequently found in Armenian toponymy, meaning "built by". According to Movses Khorenatsi, Manzikert was founded by Manaz, one of the sons of Hayk, the legendary and eponymous patriarch and progenitor of the Armenians.

=== Medieval ===
The lands around Manzikert belonged to the Manavazyans, an Armenian nakharar family which claimed descent from Manaz, until AD 333, when King Khosrov III Arshakuni of Armenia ordered that all members of the family be put to the sword. He later awarded the lands to another family, the Aghbianosyans. Manzikert was a fortified town, and served as an important trading center located in the canton of Apahunik' in the Turuberan province of the ancient Kingdom of Armenia. Following the Arab invasions of Armenia in the 7th century, it also served as the capital of the Kaysite emirate from around 860 until 964. Manzikert was the site of the Council of Manzikert in 726.

After the Armenian revolt of 771–772, the Abbasid government encouraged the migration of Arab tribes to the region, which resulted in the settling of Arab tribes near Manzikert. Under Abbasid rule, the city was a major center of commerce and industry and became one of the main cities in Asia Minor. This flourishing lasted until around the 13th century. In 968, the Byzantine general Bardas Phokas captured Manzikert, which was incorporated into the Byzantine katepanate of Basprakania (Vaspurakan).

In 991, after the death of Badh ibn Dustak of Marwanids, the Georgian king David III of Tao seized Manzikert from the Marwanids and annexed it to the Georgian kingdom of Tao. He expelled the Arabs from there and settled Georgians and Armenians in their place. Later, in 998, the Marwanids, under the command of Abu Ali al-Hasan ibn Marwān, attempted to capture Manzikert from the Georgians, but they were defeated by David III of Tao. In 1001, Manzikert was annexed by the Byzantine Empire on the basis of David III’s forced testament.

In 1054, the Seljuk Turks made an attempt to capture the city but were repulsed by the city's garrison under the command of Basil Apocapes.

The Battle of Manzikert was fought near the town in August 1071. In one of the most decisive defeats in Byzantine history, the Seljuk sultan Alp Arslan defeated and captured Emperor Romanus Diogenes, which led to the ethnic and religious transformation of Armenia and Anatolia and the establishment of the Seljuk Sultanate of Rum and later the Ottoman Empire and the Republic of Turkey. The Seljuks pillaged Manzikert itself, killed much of its population and burned the city to the ground. The city walls were substantially rebuilt during the 12th and perhaps 13th centuries under Seljuk rule. The basic design is a curtain wall with small semicircular towers projecting at intervals. The walls appear to have remained completely intact until about the end of the 18th century.

=== Modern ===
In April 1903, Manzikert was the location of an earthquake which killed about 3500 people and demolished around 12,000 buildings.

In 1915 Manzikert was part of Bitlis Vilayet and had a population of 5,000, the great majority of them Armenians. The town's economy revolved around the cultivation of grain, trade and the production of handicrafts. There existed two Armenian churches, the Three Altars Holy Mother of God (Yerek Khoran Surb Astvatsatsin) and St. George (Surb Gevork, called St. Sergius by H. F. B. Lynch), and one Armenian school.

Like many other towns and villages during the Armenian genocide, its Armenian population was uprooted and subjected to massacres.

== Climate ==
Malazgirt's climate is continental, with warm to hot and dry summers, very cold winters, and rainy springs. In the Köppen climate classification the climate is classified as Dsa.

Climate data for Malazgirt (1991–2020)
Month	Jan	Feb	Mar	Apr	May	Jun	Jul	Aug	Sep	Oct	Nov	Dec	Year
Mean daily maximum °C (°F)	−3.5 (25.7)	−1.5 (29.3)	5.6 (42.1)	14.6 (58.3)	20.6 (69.1)	27.0 (80.6)	32.1 (89.8)	32.7 (90.9)	27.5 (81.5)	19.6 (67.3)	9.4 (48.9)	0.4 (32.7)	15.4 (59.7)
Daily mean °C (°F)	−9.0 (15.8)	−7.2 (19.0)	−0.1 (31.8)	7.9 (46.2)	13.1 (55.6)	18.1 (64.6)	22.5 (72.5)	22.7 (72.9)	17.4 (63.3)	10.8 (51.4)	2.3 (36.1)	−4.8 (23.4)	7.9 (46.2)
Mean daily minimum °C (°F)	−13.5 (7.7)	−11.9 (10.6)	−4.8 (23.4)	2.1 (35.8)	6.1 (43.0)	9.1 (48.4)	12.7 (54.9)	12.5 (54.5)	7.8 (46.0)	3.5 (38.3)	−3.0 (26.6)	−8.8 (16.2)	1.0 (33.8)
Average precipitation mm (inches)	34.51 (1.36)	39.3 (1.55)	54.16 (2.13)	78.17 (3.08)	77.27 (3.04)	26.19 (1.03)	11.34 (0.45)	3.83 (0.15)	13.56 (0.53)	41.51 (1.63)	43.62 (1.72)	40.75 (1.60)	464.21 (18.28)
Average precipitation days (≥ 1.0 mm)	6.4	7.1	9.4	10.8	10.7	4.4	2.6	1.7	2.4	6.3	6.7	7.2	75.7
Average relative humidity (%)	71.6	69.9	67.3	59.4	56.7	48.3	40.2	36.9	41.7	55.4	64.8	72.0	57.0
Mean monthly sunshine hours	59.1	81.0	133.1	176.7	246.1	289.6	303.1	282.8	244.2	179.8	114.3	55.2	2,165.1
Source: NOAA

== Geology and geomorphology ==
Cemalverdi Mountains are located in the east of the Malazgirt basin.

== Tourism ==
The touristic places in Malazgirt are the historical Malazgirt Castle and Lake Kaz.

== Economy ==
Salt obtained from groundwaters in Malazgirt contributes greatly to the economy of the district.

== Demographics ==
According to the Armenian Patriarchate of Constantinople, in 1914 were lived 11,931 Armenians in the kaza of Manazkert, with 25 churches and 45 monasteries, and 15 schools. The city had a population of 5,000, mostly Armenians.

There are still a few Kurdish-Islamized Armenian households in Malazgirt.
