= Liz Plain =

Plain in the Armenian Highlands

The Liz Plain (Turkish: Liz Ovası, Erentepe Ovası), is located in the southern of the village of Erentepe. It starts from the south of the Bilican Mountains and extends to the Murat River. Its area is 160 km^{2}.

== Geology and geomorphology ==
Liz Plain is located southwest of Bulanık Plain. It is between 1500 and 1700 meters above the sea. There are 18 villages in the plain with Erentepe (Liz) Village. Barley and wheat are cultivated on the plain.
