= Murat Bridge (Muş) =

Historic bridge across the river Murat in Muş, Turkey

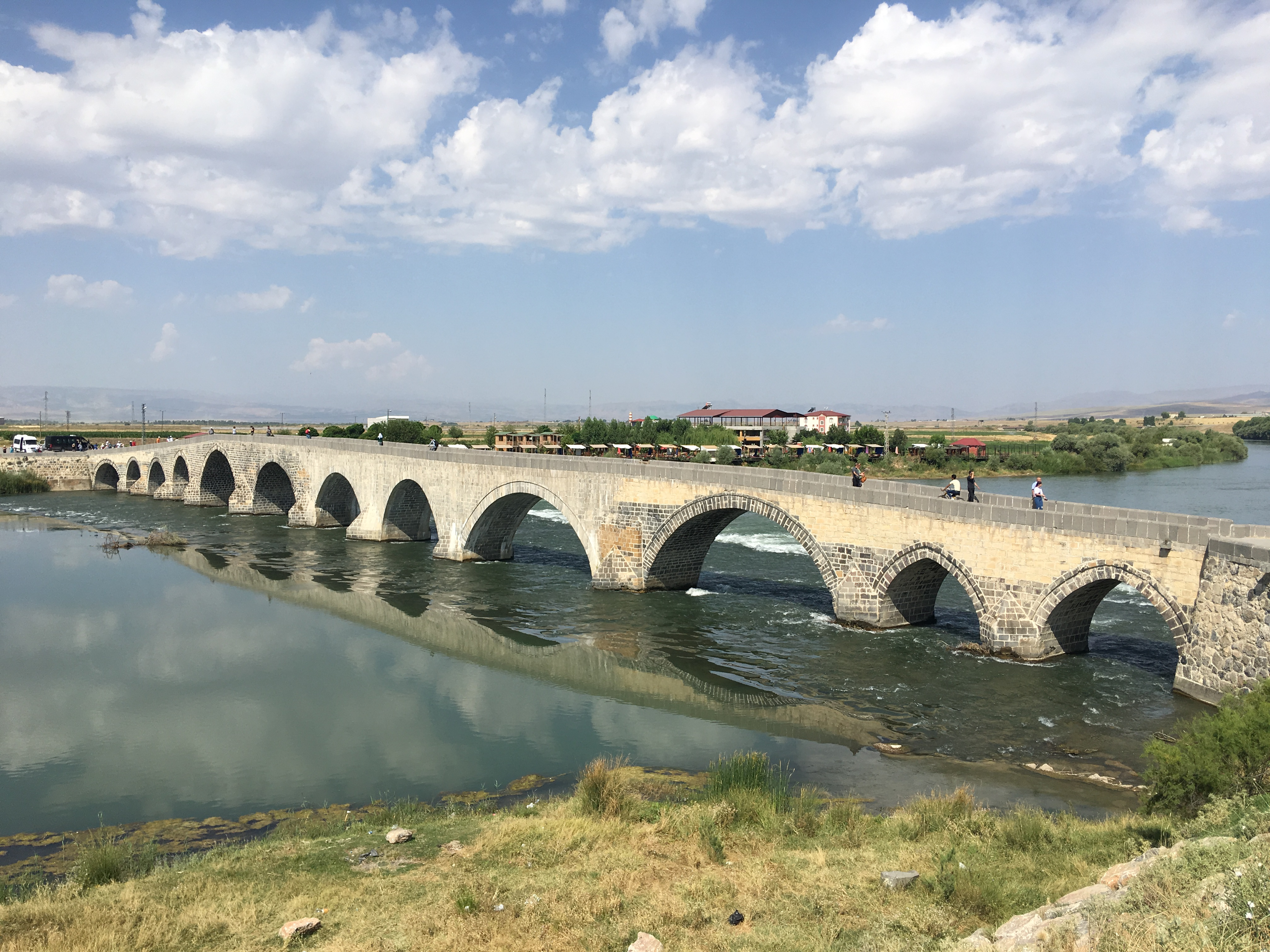
- Historical Murat Bridge
- Coordinates: 38°51′45.87″N 41°30′45.58″E
- Locale: Muş, Turkey
- Official name: Tarihi Murat Köprüsü
Heritage status
Designations

Characteristics
- Design: Arch bridge
- Total length: 190 metres (620 ft)
- Width: 5 metres (16 ft)

History
- Construction end: 1871

Murat Bridge (Turkish: Tarihi Murat Köprüsü), is a historical bridge located on the Murat River in Muş Province.

== History ==
For the first time, a bridge was built in the region during the Seljuk Dynasty in the 13th century, but the date of construction of this bridge is not clear.
