= Basil Apokapes =

Greek Byzantine general, served under various emperors

Basil Apokapes Sebastos

Doux of Edessa Vestarches
- In office 1077/1078–1083
- Monarchs: Nikephoros III Botaneiates; Alexios I Komnenos
- Preceded by: Leo
- Succeeded by: Sarkis

Katepano of Vaasprakania Sebastos
- In office 1065–c.1071
- Monarch: Constantine X Doukas

Doux of Tayk Magistros
- In office c. 1055 – after April 1059
- Monarch: Isaac I Komnenos

Strategos of Manzikert Patrikios
- In office c. 1054 – c.1055
- Monarch: Constantine IX Monomachos

Personal details
- Born: c. 1020 Tayk
- Died: 1083/1084 Edessa
- Resting place: Monastery of Saint Ge'org Ko'tewor, Edessa
- Parent: Michael Apokapes

Military service
- Allegiance: Byzantine Empire
- Years of service: c. 1051-1083
- Battles/wars: Byzantine–Seljuk wars: Siege of Manzikert (1054)

Basil Apokapes (or Apocapes) (Greek: Βασίλειος Ἀποκάπης) was a Byzantine general of the 11th century.

A descendant of the Apokapai family, an Armeno-Georgian noble clan, he was the son of the patrician Michael Apokapes or Abu K’ab, who had once served as a tent-guard for the influential Georgian Bagratid prince David III of Tao (r. 966–1000) and then commanded the city of Edessa (modern-day Şanlıurfa, Turkey) under the Byzantine Emperor Michael IV the Paphlagonian (r. 1034–1041).

In 1054, as patrikios and strategos, Basil Apokapes rallied the people of Manzikert and repulsed an attack by the Seljuks under Toğrül. Later, from 1059 to 1065, he served as archon (magistros and doux) of Paraistrion (modern northern Bulgaria, along the Danube). In 1064, together with the future emperor Nikephoros Botaneiates and his sons, he was defeated and captured by the Oghuz Turks who had crossed the northern Balkans, but the outbreak of epidemic soon decimated the invaders and the prisoners were recovered. After the defeat of Romanos IV by Andronikos Doukas in 1071, he seems to have been under the command of Philaretos Brachamios, a Byzantine general of Armenian heritage, who had established himself in Cilicia, and served him as a governor of Edessa from 1077 until his death in 1083.

== Sources ==
- Grünbart, M., "Die Familie Apokapes im Licht neuer Quellen," in N. Oikonomides, ed., Studies in Byzantine sigillography, V (Washington, DC, 1998), 29–41.
- Alexios G. C. Savvides. The Armenian-Georgian-Byzantine family of Apocapes/Abukab in the 11th c., Δίπτυχα 5 (1991), 96–104.
- Madgearu, A. (2013) Byzantine Military Organisation on the Danube, 10th-12th Centuries. Brill: Leiden.
