= Tulipa aleppensis =

- In Kurdistan

Scientific classification
- Kingdom: Plantae
- Clade: Tracheophytes
- Clade: Angiosperms
- Clade: Monocots
- Order: Liliales
- Family: Liliaceae
- Subfamily: Lilioideae
- Genus: Tulipa
- Subgenus: Tulipa subg. Tulipa
- Species: T. aleppensis

Binomial name
- Tulipa aleppensis Boiss. ex Regel

Synonyms
- Tulipa sintenisii Baker

Species of flowering plant

Tulipa aleppensis is a wild tulip in the family Liliaceae. It is native to Southeastern Turkey, Syria, near Beirut in Lebanon.

== Description ==
Tulipa aleppensis belongs to the genus Tulipa (family Liliaceae). It is a herbaceous, bulbous perennial. The tunic of the bulb is covered with long straight hairs. It forms stolons. The leaves are erect and grey-green, frequently with wavy margins. They are up to 30 cm (12 in) long and 5 cm (2.0 in) wide. The plant produces only a single cup shaped flower, which is intensely red or crimson on the outside and slightly paler inside. The tepals are pointed, the outer larger than the inner. The plant can be up to 45 cm (18 in) tall. The basal blotch is oval, black and quite short. It can also be entirely absent; very rarely, it has a narrow yellow border. Filaments and anthers are black, the pollen yellow. The flowers appear from March to May. According to the British botanist Alfred Daniel Hall, it is quite similar to Tulipa praecox, but has brighter flowers. It is triploid. Wilford suspects it of being a variant of Tulipa agenensis or Tulipa iulia. It is, however, shorter than T. agenensis and has more narrow tepals and a smaller basal blotch.

== History ==
The plant was discovered near Aleppo by the German Botanist Carl Haussknecht. It was first described in 1873 by the German botanist Eduard August von Regel. In 1874, J. Gilbert Baker described it as Tulipa oculus-solis var. allepica Baker.

As the plant is only found on cultivated land, Wilford suspects that it is a neo-tulip, descended from plants brought from Central Asia by traders. Aleppo is near the end of the Silk Road, after all.

== Habitat ==
Tulipa aleppensis is only found on cultivated land, for example, on fields or in mulberry orchards, as recorded by Hall for the Lebanese species. It is listed on the IUCN red List of threatened Species. The plant is only rarely cultivated in gardens. It needs good drainage and protection from summer rain. Tulipa aleppensis grows in Muş, Erzurum, Ağrı, Kahramanmaraş, Siirt, Gaziantep and Hakkari province. The largest population in Turkey is in the Muş plain. It blooms at the end of April. It has a flowering period of 15–20 days.
