= Dedeli, Patnos =

Dedeli
- Municipality
- Location in Turkey
- Coordinates: 39°11′N 43°04′E
- Country: Turkey
- Province: Ağrı
- District: Patnos
- Population (2021): 3,141
- Time zone: UTC+3 (TRT)

Dedeli is a town (belde) and municipality in the Patnos District, Ağrı Province, Turkey. Its population is 3,141 (2021).
