= Cemalverdi Mountains =

Mountain range in Turkey

- Location within Turkey

Highest point
- Elevation: 2.438 m (8.00 ft)
- Coordinates: 39°16′54″N 42°37′58″E

Geography
- Location: Malazgirt, Muş Province, Patnos, Ağrı Province, Turkey

Cemalverdi Mountains (Turkish: Cemalverdi Dağları) is a mountain range in Turkey at the zero point of the provincial border of Muş and Ağrı.

== History ==
The Urartian name of the Cemalverdi Mountains was Adduri Mountain.

== Geology and geomorphology ==
Cemalverdi Mountains are located in the east of the Malazgirt basin and form the eastern border of the Malazgirt Plain.
