= Yakupağa Mountains =

Mountain range in Turkey

- Location within Turkey

Highest point
- Elevation: 2.401 m (7.88 ft)
- Prominence: 2.296 m (7.53 ft)
- Coordinates: 38°57′30″N 42°24′30″E

Geography
- Location: Bulanık, Malazgirt, Muş Province, Ahlat, Bitlis Province, Turkey

Yakupağa Mountains (Turkish: Yakupağa Dağları) is a mountain range located in Turkey on the border of the provinces of Muş and Bitlis. It is surrounded by the Bilican Mountains in the west and Süphan Mountain in the east. The Yakupağa mountains are seen as an extension of the Süphan mountain.
