= Malazgirt District =

District of Muş Province, Turkey

- District
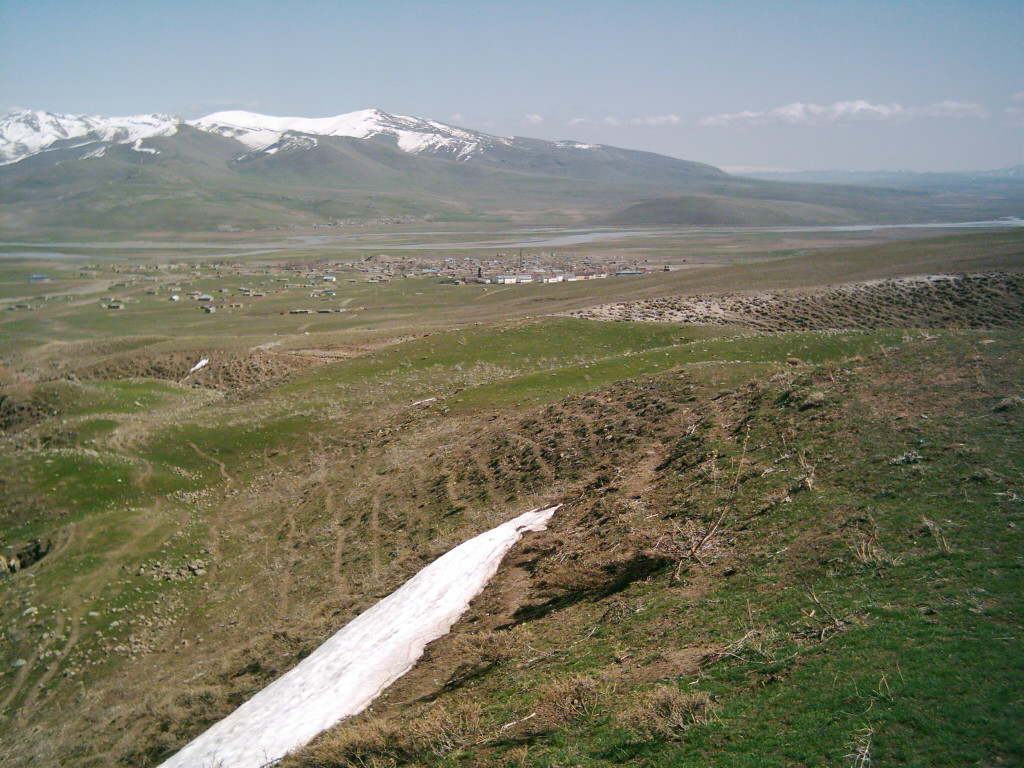
- Malazgirt countryside near Konakkuran

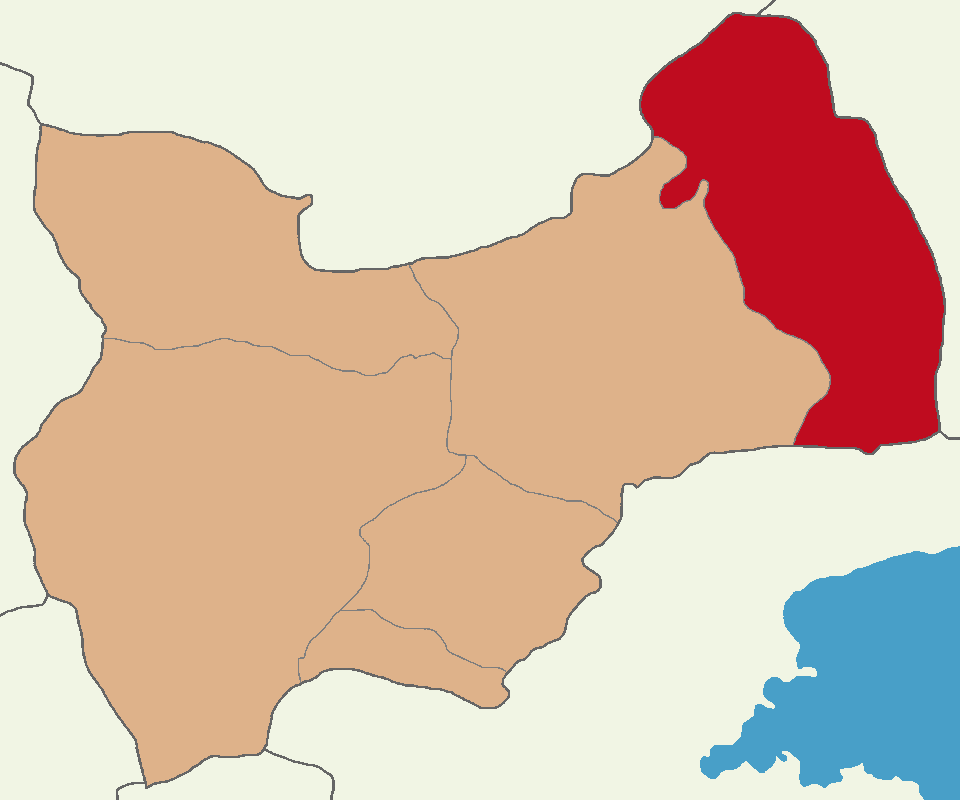
- Map showing Malazgirt District in Muş Province

- Location within Turkey
- Coordinates: 39°09′N 42°33′E
- Country: Turkey
- Province: Muş
- Seat: Malazgirt

Government
  - Kaymakam: Göksu Bayram
- Area: 1,595 km^{2} (616 sq mi)
- Population (2022): 45,371
  - Density: 28.45/km^{2} (73.67/sq mi)
- Time zone: UTC+3 (TRT)
- Website: www.malazgirt.gov.tr

Malazgirt District is a district of the Muş Province of Turkey. Its seat is the town of Malazgirt. Its area is 1,595 km^{2}, and its population is 45,371 (2022).

== Geology and geomorphology ==
Cemalverdi Mountains are located in the east of the Malazgirt basin.

== Economy ==
Salt obtained from groundwaters in Malazgirt contributes greatly to the economy of the district.

== Composition ==
There are two municipalities in Malazgirt District:

- Konakkuran
- Malazgirt

There are 75 villages in Malazgirt District:

- Adaksu
- Ağılbaşı
- Akalan
- Akören
- Aktuzla
- Alikalkan
- Alyar
- Aradere
- Arslankaya
- Aşağıkıcık
- Aynalıhoca
- Bademözü
- Bahçe
- Balkaya
- Beşçatak
- Beşdam
- Beypınar
- Bilala
- Bostankaya
- Boyçapkın
- Boyundere
- Çayırdere
- Çiçekveren
- Dirimpınar
- Doğantaş
- Dolabaş
- Erence
- Fenek
- Gölağılı
- Güleç
- Gülkoru
- Güzelbaba
- Hancağız
- Hanoğlu
- Hasanpaşa
- Hasretpınar
- İyikomşu
- Kadıköy
- Karaali
- Karahasan
- Karakaya
- Karakoç
- Kardeşler
- Karıncalı
- Kazgöl
- Kılıççı
- Kızılyusuf
- Koçali
- Kulcak
- Kuruca
- Laladağı
- Mağalcık
- Mezraaköy
- Mollabaki
- Molladerman
- Muratkolu
- Nurettin
- Odaköy
- Oğuzhan
- Okçuhan
- Örenşar
- Sarıdavut
- Selekutlu
- Sırtdüzü
- Söğütlü
- Tatargazi
- Tatlıca
- Tıkızlı
- Ulusu
- Uyanık
- Yapraklı
- Yaramış
- Yolgözler
- Yukarıkıcık
- Yurtseven
