= Patnos District =

- District
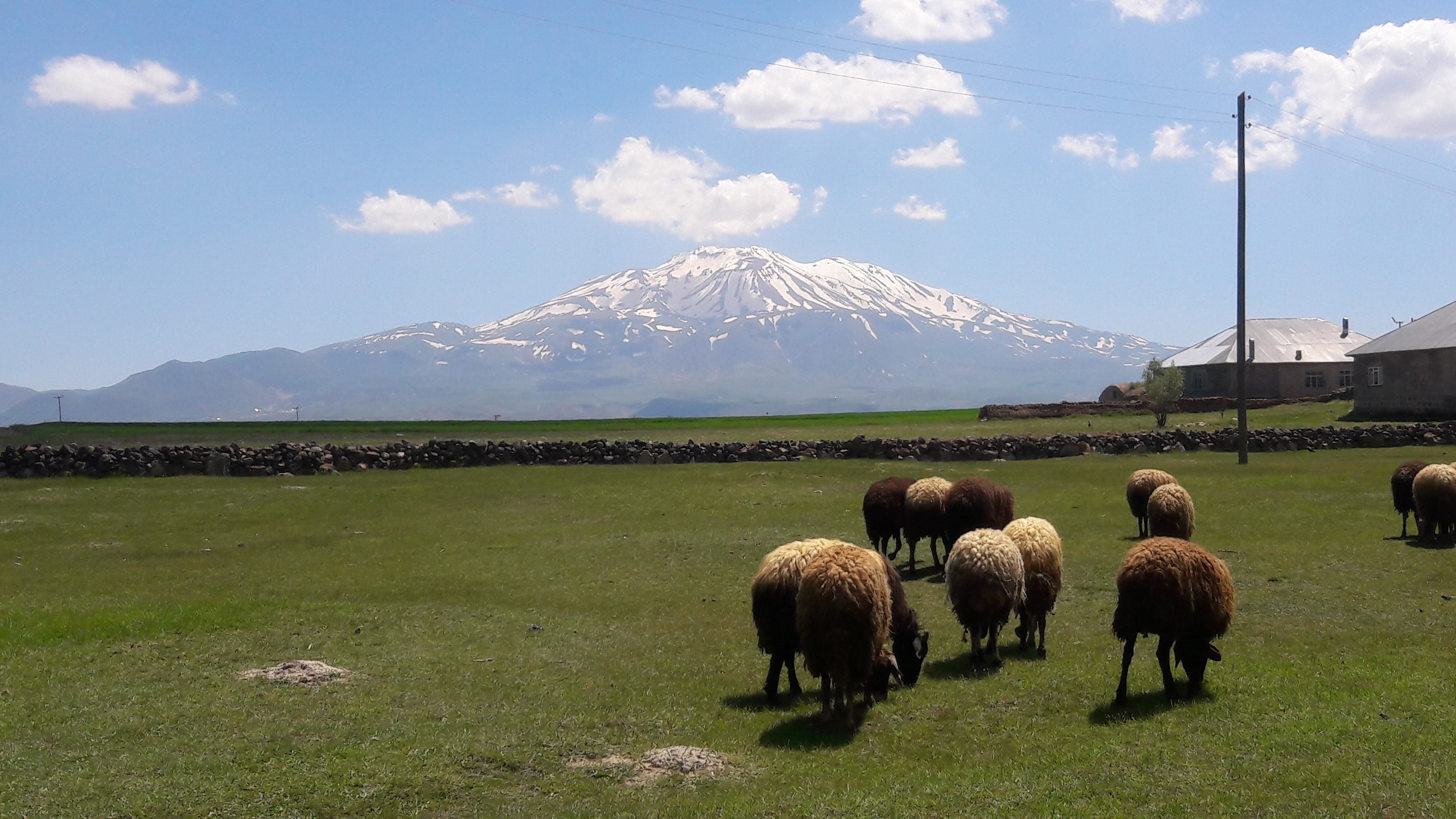
- Mt. Süphan

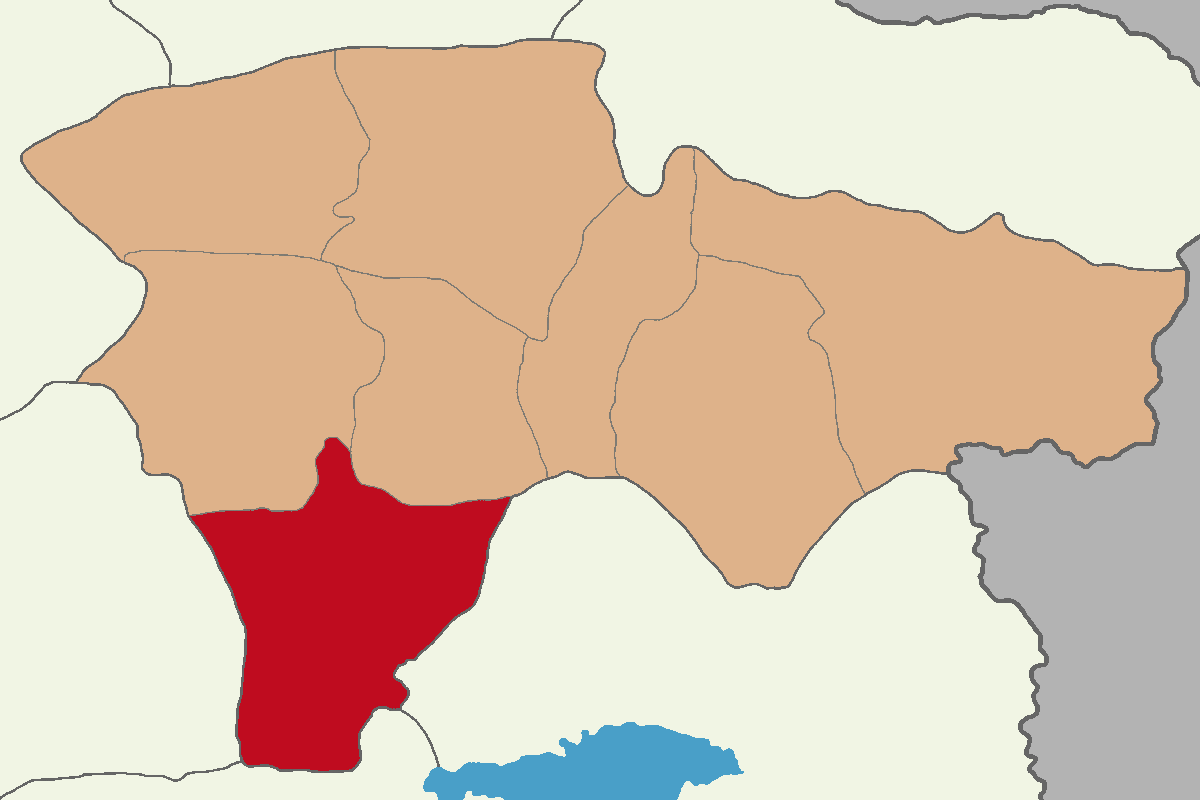
- Map showing Patnos District in Ağrı Province

- Location within Turkey
- Coordinates: 39°14′N 42°52′E
- Country: Turkey
- Province: Ağrı
- Seat: Patnos
- Area: 1,394 km^{2} (538 sq mi)
- Population (2021): 118,481
  - Density: 84.99/km^{2} (220.1/sq mi)
- Time zone: UTC+3 (TRT)
- Website: www.patnos.gov.tr

Patnos District is a district of Ağrı Province of Turkey. Its seat is the town Patnos. Its area is 1,394 km^{2}, and its population is 118,481 (2021).

== Composition ==
There are two municipalities in Patnos District:

- Dedeli
- Patnos

There are 92 villages in Patnos District:

- Akçaören
- Akdilek
- Aktepe
- Akyemiş
- Alatay
- Andaçlı
- Armutlu
- Aşağıgöçmez
- Aşağıkamışlı
- Bağbaşı
- Baltacık
- Baştarla
- Bozoğlak
- Budak
- Çakırbey
- Çamurlu
- Çaputlu
- Çatmaoluk
- Çavuşköy
- Çiçek
- Çimenli
- Çukurbağ
- Dağalan
- Değirmendüzü
- Demirören
- Derecik
- Dizginkale
- Doğansu
- Düzceli
- Edremit
- Ergeçli
- Eryılmaz
- Esenbel
- Eskikonak
- Gençali
- Gökçeali
- Gökoğlu
- Gönlüaçık
- Güllüce
- Günbeli
- Gündüz
- Güvercinli
- Hacılar
- Hasandolu
- Hisarköy
- Karatoklu
- Karbasan
- Kaş
- Kazanbey
- Keçelbaba
- Kızıltepe
- Kızkapan
- Koçaklar
- Konakbeyi
- Köseler
- Kucak
- Kuruyaka
- Kuşkaya
- Kürekli
- Meydandağı
- Mollaibrahim
- Onbaşılar
- Ortadamla
- Oyacık
- Örendik
- Özdemir
- Pirömer
- Sağrıca
- Sarıdibek
- Suluca
- Susuz
- Tanyeli
- Taşkın
- Tepeli
- Usluca
- Uzunca
- Uzungün
- Üçoymak
- Ürküt
- Yalçınkaya
- Yeşilhisar
- Yeşilyurt
- Yukarıdamla
- Yukarıgöçmez
- Yukarıkamışlı
- Yukarıkülecik
- Yurtöven
- Yüncüler
- Yürekveren
- Zincirkale
- Zirekli
- Ziyaret
