= Ahmet Mithat Kalabalık =

Turkish politician

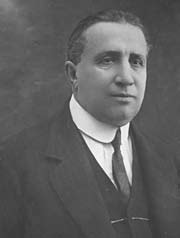

Member of the Grand National Assembly

Personal details
- Born: 1878 Constantinople, Ottoman Empire
- Died: 1953 (aged 74–75)

Ahmet Mithat Kalabalık (1878–1953) was a Turkish bureaucrat. He was a graduate of the Istanbul University's faculty of law, and served as a member of the Grand National Assembly.
