= Siege of Manzikert (1054) =

Failed Seljuk siege of the Anatolian Byzantine city

- Part of the Byzantine–Seljuk Wars
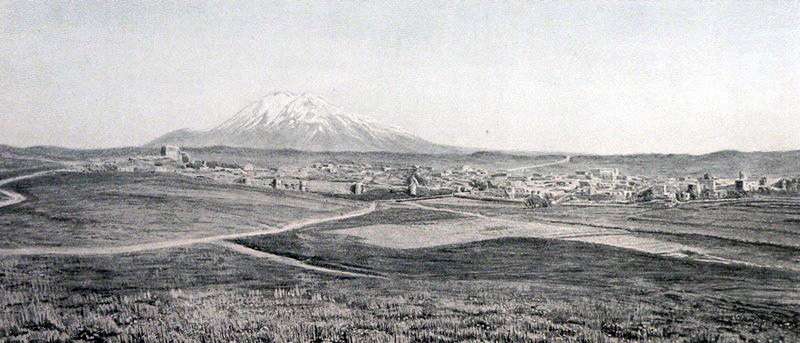
- View of the city of Malazgirt and Mount Süphan from the north, 1901
| Date | 1054 |
| Location | Manzikert Anatolia, Theme of Iberia 39°08′41″N 42°32′21″E |
| Result | Byzantine victory |

Belligerents
| Byzantine Empire | Seljuk Empire |

Commanders and leaders
| Basil Apokapes | Tughril I |

The Siege of Manzikert in 1054 was a successful defence of the city of Manzikert by Byzantine forces under Basil Apokapes, against the Seljuks under Tughril I.

== Siege ==
Tughril besieged Manzikert for thirty days, using all sorts of siege engines, but the city held. A historical account cited the successful defence against the Seljuk use of a light type of tortoise, mobile shelters that protected men and siege weapons from missile fire. Basil is said to have stored large sharpened beams, which were thrown at the advancing tortoises, overturning them in the process. A lone Latin soldier came out of the city upon his horse and threw a Greek fire grenade at Tughril's main siege engine, burning it completely, before returning back to the city unharmed. The city itself was able to withstand the onslaught due to its triple wall and access to spring water.

== Aftermath ==
Seventeen years later, the Seljuks under Alp Arslan would experience greater success against Romanos IV Diogenes, at the same place, with the city falling, alongside the Byzantine defeat in 1071.

== Sources ==
- Brunet de Presle, Wladimir; Bekker, Immanuel, eds. (1853). Corpus scriptorum historiae Byzantinae: Michaelis Attaliotae historia (in Ancient Greek and Latin). Weber.
- Chatzelis, Georgios (2019). Byzantine Military Manuals as Literary Works and Practical Handbooks: The Case of the Tenth-Century Sylloge Tacticorum. Oxon: Routledge. ISBN 9781138596016.
- Skylitzes, John (2010). John Skylitzes: A Synopsis of Byzantine History, 811–1057: Translation and Notes. Translated by Wortley, John. Cambridge, UK: Cambridge University Press. ISBN 9780521767057.
