= Lake Kaz =

Lake in Turkey

- Location within Turkey
- Location: Kazgöl, Malazgirt, Muş Province
- Coordinates: 39.3370°N 42.3234°E
- Lake type: Karst lake
- Basin countries: Turkey
- Surface area: 0.93 km^{2} (0.36 sq mi)
- Surface elevation: 1.700 m (5 ft 6.9 in)

Lake Kaz (Turkish: Kaz Gölü); is a lake in the Malazgirt district of Muş province. It is shape and is an important wetland for birds.

== Geology and geography ==
The water of the lake is salty and bitter. The dish of Kaz lake is a valley formed connected to the Kocasu fault.
