= Malazgirt Plain =

Plain in the Armenian Highlands

The Malazgirt Plain (Turkish: Malazgirt Ovası, Kurdish: Deşta Milazgirê), is located in the northern part of the city center of Malazgirt, Turkey. The eastern border of the Malazgirt Plain is formed by the Cemalverdi Mountains located on the border of the Patnos district of Ağrı.

== Geology and geomorphology ==
The area of the plain is 450 km^{2} (170 sq mi). The Murat River passes through the north of the plain. The main streams located in Bulanık-Malazgirt Plain are Kocasu Stream, Körsü Stream, Şekerbulak Stream, Bağdişan Stream and Kesik Stream.
