= Karaçavuş Mountains =

Mountain range in Turkey

- Location within Turkey

Highest point
- Elevation: 2.746 m (9.01 ft)
- Coordinates: 38°40′02″N 41°27′02″E

Geography
- Location: Muş Province, Turkey
- Parent range: Taurus Mountains

Karaçavuş Mountains (Turkish: Karaçavuş Dağları) is a mountain range in the south of Muş province. The city of Muş is located at the foot of the mountain.

== Geology and geomorphology ==
The highest point of the Karaçavuş Mountains is Çavuş(Kurtik) Mountain with a height of 2.746 meters. The Karaçavuş Mountains extend from the border of Genç District to the Rahva plain near Güroymak.
