= Patnos =

- Municipality
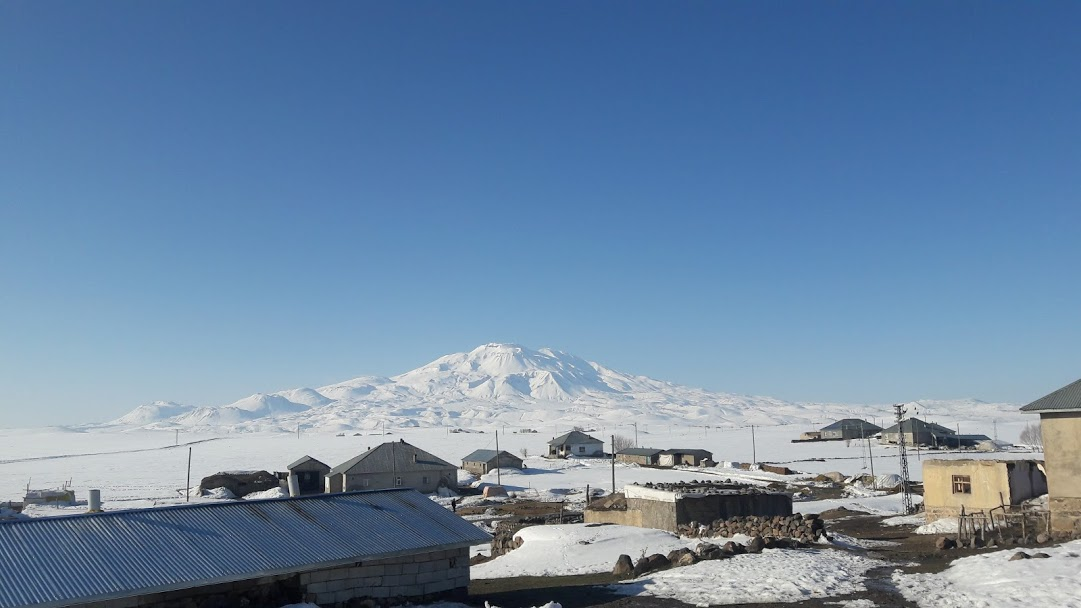
- Mt. Süphan from Patnos

- Logo

- Location within Turkey
- Coordinates: 39°14′09″N 42°52′07″E
- Country: Turkey
- Province: Ağrı
- District: Patnos

Government
  - Mayor: Abdulhalik Taşkın (Ak Parti)
- Population (2021): 61,837
- Time zone: UTC+3 (TRT)
- Postal code: 04500
- Website: www.patnos.bel.tr

Patnos (Armenian: Բադնոց, Latin transliteration: Badnoc‘ or Patnoc‘, Kurdish: Panos) is a city of Ağrı Province of Turkey on a plain surrounded by high mountains including Süphan, watered by tributaries of the Murat River. It is 82 km south of the city of Ağrı on the road to Van. It is the seat of Patnos District. Its population is 61,837 (2021). The mayor is Abdulhalik Taşkın (Ak Parti) in 2024.

The plain has been settled since at least 1300BC and this was a centre of the Urartu civilisation. The city has many historical ruins from Urartian period.
