= List of populated places in Muş Province =

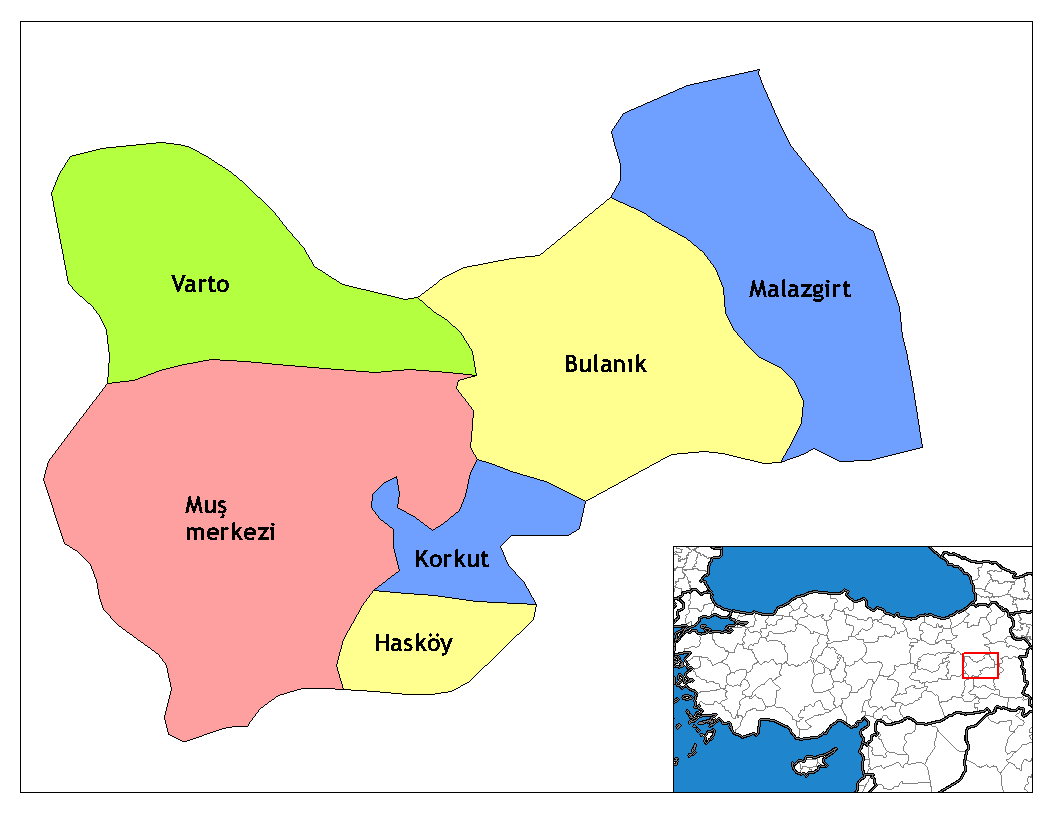
Muş Province

Below is the list of populated places in Muş Province, Turkey by the districts. In the following lists first place in each list is the administrative center of the district.

== Muş ==
- Muş
- Ağaçlık, Muş
- Ağartı, Muş
- Ağıllı, Muş
- Akkonak, Muş
- Akpınar, Muş
- Alagün, Muş
- Alaniçi, Muş
- Alican, Muş
- Aligedik
- Arıköy, Muş
- Arpayazı, Muş
- Aşağısızma, Muş
- Aşağıyongalı, Muş
- Aydoğan, Muş
- Bağlar, Muş
- Bahçeköy, Muş
- Beşparmak, Muş
- Bilek, Muş
- Bostankent
- Boyuncuk, Muş
- Bozbulut, Muş
- Cevizlidere, Muş
- Çatbaşı, Muş
- Çiçekli, Muş
- Çöğürlü, Muş
- Çukurbağ, Muş
- Derecik, Muş
- Dereyurt, Muş
- Dilimli, Muş
- Donatım, Muş
- Dumlusu, Muş
- Durugöze, Muş
- Eğirmeç, Muş
- Ekindüzü, Muş
- Elçiler, Muş
- Eralanı, Muş
- Erencik, Muş
- Gölköy, Muş
- Güdümlü, Muş
- Gümüşali, Muş
- Gündoğan, Muş
- Güzeltepe, Muş
- Harman, Muş
- Ilıca, Muş
- İnardı, Muş
- Kalecik, Muş
- Karaağaçlı, Muş
- Karabey, Muş
- Karaköprü, Muş
- Karakuyu, Muş
- Karameşe, Muş
- Karlıdere, Muş
- Kayalısu, Muş
- Kayaşık, Muş
- Keçidere, Muş
- Kepenek, Muş
- Kırköy, Muş
- Kıyıbaşı, Muş
- Kıyık, Muş
- Kızılağaç, Muş
- Konukbekler, Muş
- Köşk, Muş
- Kumluca, Muş
- Kutlugün, Muş
- Mercimekkale, Muş
- Mescitli, Muş
- Muratgören, Muş
- Nadaslık, Muş
- Ortakent, Muş
- Özdilek, Muş
- Sarıdal
- Savaşçılar, Muş
- Serinova, Muş
- Soğucak, Muş
- Suboyu, Muş
- Sudurağı, Muş
- Suluca, Muş
- Sungu, Muş
- Suvaran, Muş
- Sürügüden
- Sütlüce, Muş
- Şenoba, Muş
- Tabanlı, Muş
- Tandoğan, Muş
- Taşoluk, Muş
- Tekyol, Muş
- Toprakkale, Muş
- Tüten, Muş
- Ulukaya, Muş
- Üçdere, Muş
- Üçevler, Muş
- Üçsırt
- Yarpuzlu, Muş
- Yaygin, Muş
- Yazla, Muş
- Yelalan, Muş
- Yeşilce, Muş
- Yeşilova, Muş
- Yoncalıöz, Muş
- Yörecik, Muş
- Yukarısızma
- Yukarıyongalı, Muş
- Yücetepe, Muş
- Ziyaret, Muş

== Bulanık ==
- Bulanık
- Adıvar, Bulanık
- Akçaarmut, Bulanık
- Akçakaynak
- Altınoluk, Bulanık
- Arakonak, Bulanık
- Aşağıbüklü, Bulanık
- Balotu, Bulanık
- Bostancılar, Bulanık
- Büngüldek, Bulanık
- Cankurtaran, Bulanık
- Çataklı, Bulanık
- Çaygeldi, Bulanık
- Değirmensuyu, Bulanık
- Demirkapı, Bulanık
- Doğantepe, Bulanık
- Dokuzpınar, Bulanık
- Elmakaya, Bulanık
- Erentepe, Bulanık
- Ericek, Bulanık
- Esenlik, Bulanık
- Eskiyol, Bulanık
- Gölyanı, Bulanık
- Göztepe, Bulanık
- Gülçimen, Bulanık
- Gümüşpınar, Bulanık
- Günbatmaz, Bulanık
- Gündüzü, Bulanık
- Günyurdu, Bulanık
- Han, Bulanık
- Hoşgeldi, Bulanık
- Karaağıl, Bulanık
- Karaburun, Bulanık
- Karacaören, Bulanık
- Kırkgöze, Bulanık
- Kotanlı, Bulanık
- Koyunağılı, Bulanık
- Köprüyolu, Bulanık
- Kurganlı, Bulanık
- Meşeiçi, Bulanık
- Molladavut, Bulanık
- Mollakent, Bulanık
- Oğlakkaya, Bulanık
- Okçular, Bulanık
- Olurdere, Bulanık
- Örenkent, Bulanık
- Rüstemgedik, Bulanık
- Samanyolu, Bulanık
- Sarıpınar, Bulanık
- Seçme, Bulanık
- Sıradere, Bulanık
- Söğütlü, Bulanık
- Sultanlı, Bulanık
- Şatırlar, Bulanık
- Şehittahir, Bulanık
- Şehitveren, Bulanık
- Toklular, Bulanık
- Uzgörür, Bulanık
- Üçtepe, Bulanık
- Yazbaşı, Bulanık
- Yemişen, Bulanık
- Yokuşbaşı, Bulanık
- Yoncalı, Bulanık

== Hasköy ==
- Hasköy, Muş
- Aşağıüçdam, Hasköy
- Azıklı, Hasköy
- Böğürdelen, Hasköy
- Büvetli, Hasköy
- Dağdibi, Hasköy
- Düzkışla, Hasköy
- Elmabulak, Hasköy
- Eşmepınar, Hasköy
- Gökyazı, Hasköy
- Karakütük, Hasköy
- Koç, Hasköy
- Koğuktaş, Hasköy
- Ortanca, Hasköy
- Otaç, Hasköy
- Sarıbahçe, Hasköy
- Umurca, Hasköy
- Yarkaya, Hasköy
- Yukarıüçdam, Hasköy

== Korkut ==
- Korkut
- Akyıldız, Korkut
- Alazlı, Korkut
- Altınova, Korkut
- Balkır, Korkut
- Çalaplı, Korkut
- Çınarardı, Korkut
- Değirmitaş, Korkut
- Demirci, Korkut
- Durucak, Korkut
- Düzova, Korkut
- Gültepe, Korkut
- Güneyik, Korkut
- Güven, Korkut
- İçboğaz, Korkut
- Kapılı, Korkut
- Karakale, Korkut
- Kocatarla, Korkut
- Konakdüzü, Korkut
- Mollababa, Korkut
- Oğulbalı, Korkut
- Pınarüstü, Korkut
- Sarmaşık, Korkut
- Sazlıkbaşı, Korkut
- Tan, Korkut
- Taşlıca, Korkut
- Yedipınar, Korkut
- Yolgözler, Korkut
- Yünören, Korkut
- Yürekli, Korkut

== Malazgirt ==
- Malazgirt
- Aktuzla, Malazgirt
- Adaksu, Malazgirt
- Ağılbaşı, Malazgirt
- Akalan, Malazgirt
- Akören, Malazgirt
- Alikalkan, Malazgirt
- Alyar, Malazgirt
- Aradere, Malazgirt
- Arslankaya, Malazgirt
- Aşağıkıcık, Malazgirt
- Aynalıhoca, Malazgirt
- Bademözü, Malazgirt
- Bahçe, Malazgirt
- Balkaya, Malazgirt
- Beşçatak, Malazgirt
- Beşdam, Malazgirt
- Beypınar, Malazgirt
- Bilala, Malazgirt
- Bostankaya, Malazgirt
- Boyçapkın, Malazgirt
- Boyundere, Malazgirt
- Çayırdere, Malazgirt
- Çiçekveren, Malazgirt
- Dirimpınar, Malazgirt
- Doğantaş, Malazgirt
- Dolabaş, Malazgirt
- Erence, Malazgirt
- Fenek, Malazgirt
- Gölağılı, Malazgirt
- Güleç, Malazgirt
- Gülkoru, Malazgirt
- Güzelbaba, Malazgirt
- Hancağız, Malazgirt
- Hanoğlu, Malazgirt
- Hasanpaşa, Malazgirt
- Hasretpınar, Malazgirt
- İyikomşu, Malazgirt
- Kadıköy, Malazgirt
- Karaali, Malazgirt
- Karahasan, Malazgirt
- Karakaya, Malazgirt
- Karakoç, Malazgirt
- Kardeşler, Malazgirt
- Karıncalı, Malazgirt
- Kazgöl, Malazgirt
- Kılıççı, Malazgirt
- Kızılyusuf, Malazgirt
- Koçali, Malazgirt
- Konakkuran, Malazgirt
- Kulcak, Malazgirt
- Kuruca, Malazgirt
- Laladağı, Malazgirt
- Mağalcık, Malazgirt
- Mezraaköy, Malazgirt
- Mollabaki, Malazgirt
- Molladerman, Malazgirt
- Muratkolu, Malazgirt
- Nurettin, Malazgirt
- Odaköy, Malazgirt
- Oğuzhan, Malazgirt
- Okçuhan, Malazgirt
- Örenşar, Malazgirt
- Sarıdavut, Malazgirt
- Selekutu, Malazgirt
- Sırtdüzü, Malazgirt
- Söğütlü, Malazgirt
- Tatargazi, Malazgirt
- Tatlıca, Malazgirt
- Tıkızlı, Malazgirt
- Ulusu, Malazgirt
- Uyanık, Malazgirt
- Yapraklı, Malazgirt
- Yaramış, Malazgirt
- Yolgözler, Malazgirt
- Yukarıkıcık, Malazgirt
- Yurtseven, Malazgirt

== Varto ==
- Varto
- Acarkent, Varto
- Ağaçaltı, Varto
- Ağaçkorur, Varto
- Akçatepe, Varto
- Alabalık, Varto
- Anlıaçık, Varto
- Armutkaşı, Varto
- Aşağı Alagöz, Varto
- Aşağı Hacıbey, Varto
- Bağiçi, Varto
- Baltaş, Varto
- Başkent, Varto
- Beşikkaya, Varto
- Boyalı, Varto
- Boylu, Varto
- Buzlugöze, Varto
- Çalıdere, Varto
- Çaltılı, Varto
- Çayçatı, Varto
- Çayıryolu, Varto
- Çaylar, Varto
- Çayönü, Varto
- Çobandağı, Varto
- Dağcılar, Varto
- Dallıöz, Varto
- Değerli, Varto
- Derince, Varto
- Diktepeler, Varto
- Doğanca, Varto
- Dönertaş, Varto
- Durucabulak, Varto
- Dutözü, Varto
- Erdoğan, Varto
- Eryurdu, Varto
- Esenler, Varto
- Gelintaşı, Varto
- Göltepe, Varto
- Gölyayla, Varto
- Görgü, Varto
- Güzeldere, Varto
- Güzelkent, Varto
- Haksever, Varto
- Hüseyinoğlu, Varto
- İçmeler, Varto
- İlbey, Varto
- Kalecik, Varto
- Karaköy, Varto
- Karameşe, Varto
- Karapınar, Varto
- Kartaldere, Varto
- Kayadelen, Varto
- Kayalıdere, Varto
- Kayalık, Varto
- Kayalıkale, Varto
- Kaygıntaş, Varto
- Kaynarca, Varto
- Koçyatağı, Varto
- Kolan, Varto
- Köprücük, Varto
- Kumlukıyı, Varto
- Kuşluk, Varto
- Küçüktepe, Varto
- Leylek, Varto
- Ocaklı, Varto
- Oğlakçı, Varto
- Omcalı, Varto
- Onpınar, Varto
- Ölçekli, Varto
- Özenç, Varto
- Özkonak, Varto
- Sağlıcak, Varto
- Sanlıca, Varto
- Sazlıca, Varto
- Seki, Varto
- Taşçı, Varto
- Taşdibek, Varto
- Taşlıyayla, Varto
- Teknedüzü, Varto
- Tepe, Varto
- Tuzlu, Varto
- Ulusırt, Varto
- Üçbulak, Varto
- Ünaldı, Varto
- Yarlısu, Varto
- Yayıklı, Varto
- Yayla, Varto
- Yedikavak, Varto
- Yeşildal, Varto
- Yeşilpınar, Varto
- Yılanlı, Varto
- Yukarı Hacıbey, Varto
- Yurttutan, Varto
- Zorabat, Varto
