= List of municipalities in Muş Province =

This is the List of municipalities in Muş Province, Turkey as of March 2023.

District	Municipality
Bulanık	Bulanık
Bulanık	Elmakaya
Bulanık	Erentepe
Bulanık	Rüstemgedik
Bulanık	Sarıpınar
Bulanık	Uzgörür
Bulanık	Yoncalı
Hasköy	Düzkışla
Hasköy	Hasköy
Korkut	Altınova
Korkut	Korkut
Malazgirt	Konakkuran
Malazgirt	Malazgirt
Muş	Karaağaçlı
Muş	Kırköy
Muş	Kızılağaç
Muş	Konukbekler
Muş	Muş
Muş	Serinova
Muş	Sungu
Muş	Yaygın
Muş	Yeşilova
Varto	Varto
