= Hamurpet Imam Hatip Secondary School =

American public high school

Location
- Yurttutan village, Toklu Mezrası No01; Varto; Turkey
- Coordinates: 39.062214°N 41.813833°E

Information
- Type: Secondary School
- Founded: 2014
- Staff: 17
- Enrollment: 208
- Website: hamurpetimamhatiportaokulu.meb.k12.tr

Hamurpet Imam Hatip Secondary School is a secondary school in Varto district of Muş Province, Turkey

== Overview ==
Hamurpet Imam Hatip secondary school is 50 kilometers away from Varto district and 75 kilometers from Muş city center. With this school, the education needs of Yurttutan, Toklu, Esenler, Erdoğan, Derince, Değerli, Sanlıca, Kumlukıyı, Boyalı, Yuvalı and Akçatepe villages are met.

== Athletics ==
Hamurpet Imam Hatip Secondary School students have achieved successes such as the Turkey championship 4 times.
