= Bulanık (disambiguation) =

Bulanık is a town and district of Muş Province, Turkey

Bulanık (literally "murky" or "blurry" in Turkish) may refer to the following places in Turkey:

- Bulanık, Ardanuç, a village in the district of Ardanuç, Artvin Province
- Bulanık, Çay, a village in the district of Çay, Afyonkarahisar Province
- Bulanık, Göynük, a village in the district of Göynük, Bolu Province
- Bulanık, Mudurnu, a village in the district of Mudurnu, Bolu Province
- Bulanık, Üzümlü, a village in the district of Üzümlü, Erzincan Province
- Lake Bulanık, a lake in the Bulanık District
