= Kocasu Creek (Hınıs) =

River in eastern Turkey

- Routes of Kocasu creek

Location
- Country: Turkey
- Geographical region: Armenian highlands
- Political region: Eastern Anatolia region

Physical characteristics
- Source
  - location: Bingöl Mountains, north of Varto District
  - coordinates: 39°20′24″N 41°29′58″E
  - elevation: 3,193 m (10,476 ft)
- Mouth
  - location: Sarıpınar, Bulanık, Muş
  - coordinates: 39°10′15″N 42°08′55″E
  - elevation: 1,450 m (4,760 ft)
- Length: 100 km (62 mi)

Basin features
- River system: Murat River

Location of Kocasu Creek's source and mouth.

The Kocasu Creek, also called Hınıs Çayı (Turkish: Kocasu Çayı), is one of the tributaries of the Murat River in the Eastern Anatolia region of Turkey.

== Geology and geography ==
During the eroding factors and processes of volcanic activities on Bingöl Mountains, valleys were formed from various stair-like steps or levels from bottom to top. Kocasu Creek is originates from the Bingöl Mountains in the west of Hınıs and north of Varto. It consists of a combination of more than 20 streams coming from the valleys extending horizontally from the west to Hınıs. After taking the waters descending from the Akdoğan Mountains, passing through Karaçoban, it descends from the Malazgirt border to the borders of Bulanık district and mixes with the Murat River near Sarıpınar village.
