= Chechens in Turkey =

Ethnic group in the Republic of Turkey

Turkish Chechens
Total population
- 100,000

Languages
- Turkish, Chechen, Russian

Religion
- Sunni Islam

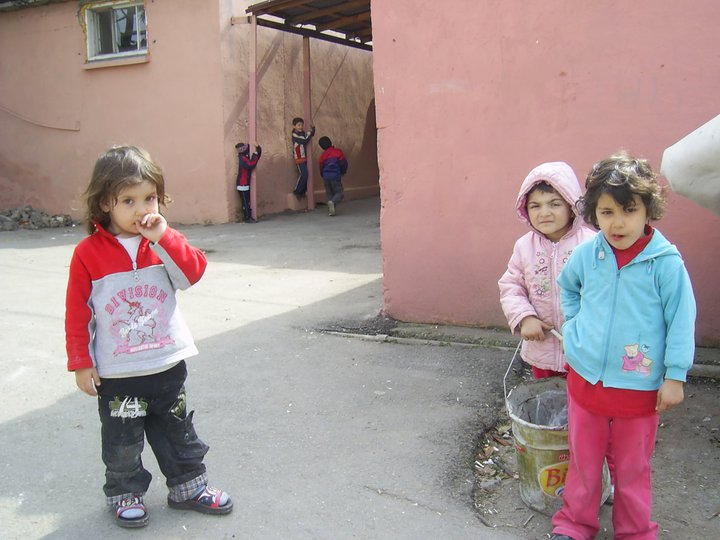
Kids of the Chechen refugee camp in Fenerbahçe, İstanbul. (2011)

Chechens in Turkey (Chechen: Туркойчура нохчий, romanized: Turkoyçura noxçiy; Turkish: Türkiye Çeçenleri) are Turkish citizens of Chechen descent and Chechen refugees living in Turkey. The Chechen diaspora in Turkey dates back to the 19th century when the Russian Empire started ethnically cleansing Chechens from their homeland; these expulsions would later become known as the Chechen genocide, contemporaneous with the Circassian genocide.

== Villages ==
Chechen villages in Turkey:

Name	Local name	Province
Ağaçlı	Ağaçlı	Adana
Dikilitaş	Dikilitaş	Adana
Karalık	Karalık	Yozgat
Kesikköprü	Kesikköprü	Yozgat
Aşağıborandere	Aşağıborandere / Şeşen Jambotey	Kayseri
Aydınalan	Aydınalan	Kars
Yenigazi	Yenigazi	Kars
Altınyayla	Altınyayla	Kahramanmaraş
Çardak	Çardak	Kahramanmaraş
Sisne	Sisne	Kahramanmaraş
Gücüksu	Gücüksu / Behliöyl	Kahramanmaraş
Bağiçi	Bağiçi	Muş
Bozkurt	Bozkurt	Muş
Çöğürlü	Çöğürlü	Muş
Kıyıbaşı	Kıyıbaşı / Arıncık	Muş
Serinova	Serinova	Muş
Tepeköy	Tepeköy	Muş
Ulusırt	Ulusırt	Muş
Alaçayır	Alaçayır	Sivas
Canabtal	Canabdal	Sivas
Demirköprü	Demirköprü	Sivas
Kahvepınar	Kahvepınar	Sivas
Kazancık	Kazancık	Sivas
Yukarıhüyük	Yukarıhüyük	Sivas
Çınardere	Çınardere	Çanakkale

== Notable Chechen Turks ==
- Hüseyin Özkan, Turkish judoka
- Ramazan Şahin, Russian-Turkish freestyle wrestler of Chechen descent
