= Korkut (disambiguation) =

Korkut is a town of Muş Province, Turkey.

Korkut or KORKUT may also refer to:

- Korkut, the central character of the Turkic epic Book of Dede Korkut
- Korkut (name), a Turkish name (including a list of people with the name)
- Korkut District, a district of Muş Province, Turkey
- Korkut, Gümüşhacıköy, a village in Amasya Province, Turkey
- KORKUT, Turkish Self-propelled anti-aircraft weapon
