= USS Orleck =

Gearing-class destroyer

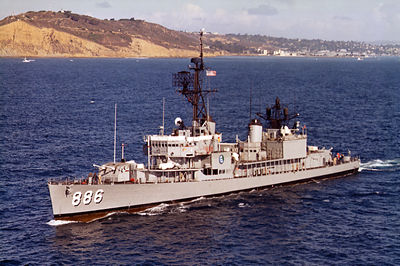
- USS Orleck in 1964

History

United States
- Name: Orleck
- Namesake: Joseph Orleck
- Builder: Consolidated Steel Corporation, Orange, Texas
- Laid down: 28 November 1944
- Launched: 12 May 1945
- Commissioned: 15 September 1945
- Decommissioned: 1 October 1982
- Stricken: 6 August 1987
- Identification: Callsign: NBIG; Hull number: DD-886
- Honors and awards: 4 battle stars (Korea)
- Fate: Transferred to Turkey 1 October 1982
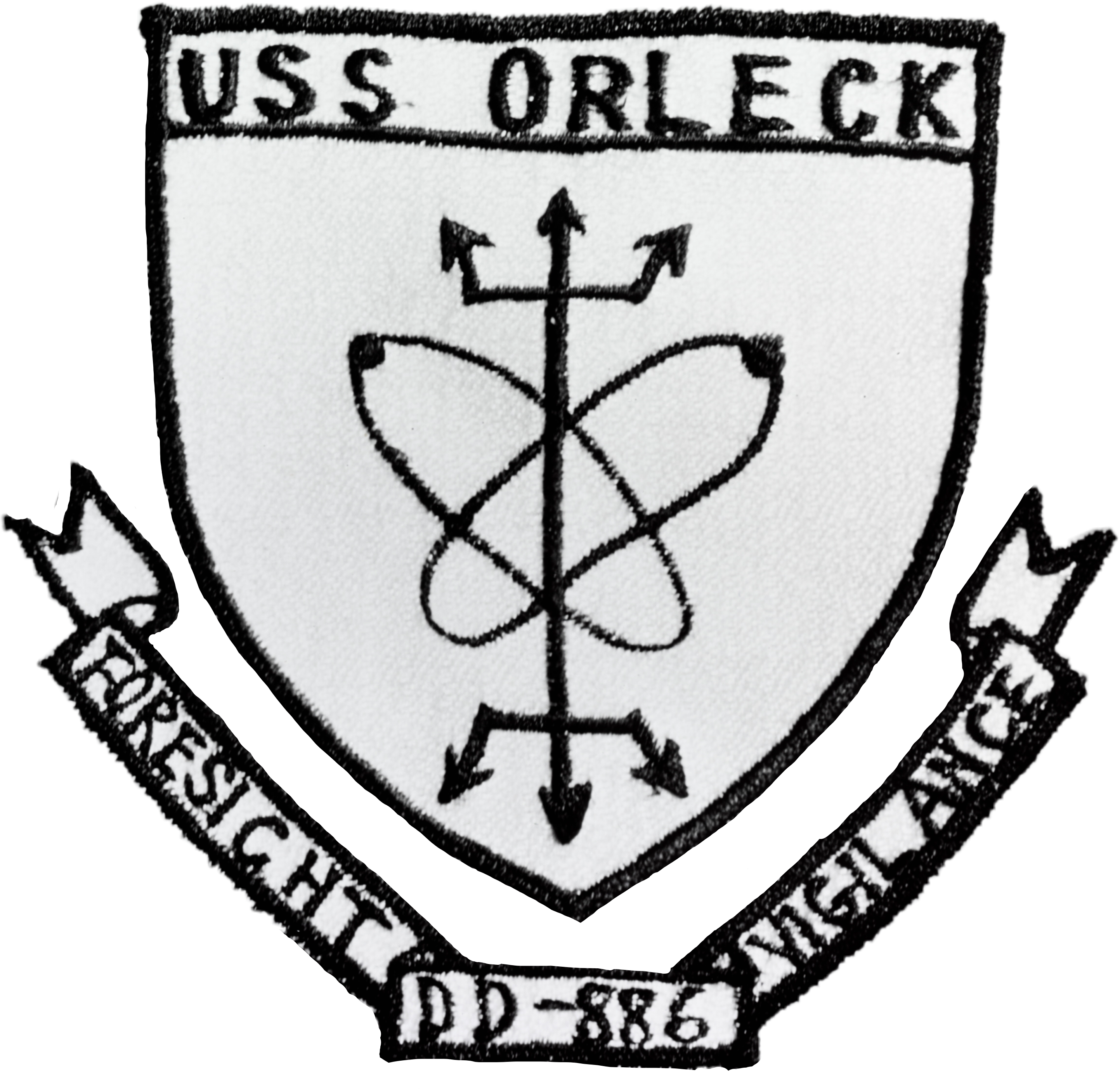
- Badge

Turkey
- Name: Yücetepe
- Namesake: Yücetepe
- Acquired: 1 October 1982
- Identification: Hull number: D 345
- Fate: Returned to the USA 12 August 2000
- Status: Museum ship in Jacksonville, Florida

General characteristics
- Class & type: Gearing-class destroyer
- Displacement: 2,616 long tons (2,658 t) standard; 3,460 long tons (3,516 t) full
- Length: 390 ft 6 in (119.02 m)
- Beam: 40 ft 10 in (12.45 m)
- Draft: 14 ft 4 in (4.37 m)
- Propulsion: General Electric geared turbines; 4 boilers; 2 shafts; 60,000 shp (45 MW)
- Speed: 36.8 knots (68.2 km/h; 42.3 mph)
- Range: 4,500 nmi (8,300 km) at 20 kn (37 km/h; 23 mph)
- Complement: 336
- Armament: (as built); 6 × 5"/38 caliber guns; 12 × 40 mm AA guns; 11 × 20 mm AA guns; 10 × 21 inch (533 mm) torpedo tubes; 6 × K-gun depth charge projectors; 2 × depth charge tracks; (as preserved, 1962 FRAM I configuration); 4 × 5 in/38 cal guns (127 mm) (in 2 × 2 Mk 38 DP mounts); 1 × ASROC 8-cell launcher; 2 × triple Mark 32 torpedo tubes for Mark 46 torpedoes

USS Orleck (DD-886), is a Gearing-class destroyer that was in service with the United States Navy from 1945 to 1982. In October 1982, she was sold to Turkey and renamed Yücetepe (D 345). After her final decommissioning, the Turkish government transferred Yücetepe to the Southeast Texas War Memorial and Heritage Foundation at Orange, Texas, where she was berthed as a museum ship. The Orleck Foundation then decided to move the ship to the Calcasieu River in Lake Charles, Louisiana. On 26 March 2022, she arrived in Jacksonville, Florida, where she served as a naval museum on the downtown riverfront until 3 April 2023, when she docked at her permanent home at the Shipyards West.

== Namesake ==
Joseph Orleck was born on 22 January 1906 in Columbus, Ohio. He enlisted in the Navy on 23 June 1924. Rising through the enlisted ranks, he was warranted boatswain on 14 December 1938, and appointed ensign on 15 June 1942. He assumed command of USS Nauset on 28 May 1943 with the rank of lieutenant. He went down with his ship after a Luftwaffe bomber attack in the Gulf of Salerno on 9 September 1943. A recipient of the Navy and Marine Corps Medal for rescue work during the Casablanca invasion, he was posthumously awarded the Navy Cross for his firefighting and flood-control efforts to prevent total loss of his ship during the Salerno assault.

== Construction and commissioning ==
Orleck was laid down by the Consolidated Steel Corporation at Orange, Texas, on 28 November 1944, launched on 12 May 1945, sponsored by Mrs. Joseph Orleck, widow of Lieutenant Orleck, and commissioned on 15 September 1945. Her original cost was US$6,313,000.

== Service history ==
=== United States Navy (1945–1982) ===
On 14 November 1947, Orleck collided with the submarine USS Bugara (SS-331) while Bugara was making a submerged practice attack against her in the Pacific Ocean off Southern California.

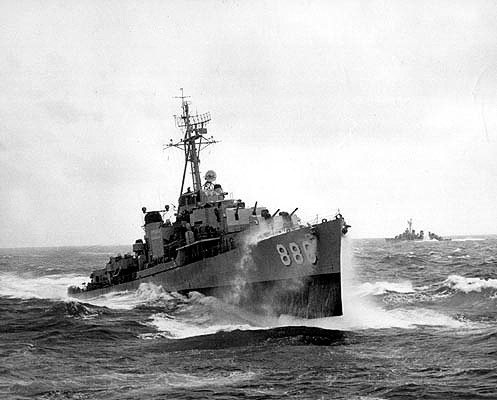
Orleck in heavy seas, 1950s

Orleck operated with the United States Seventh Fleet in support of United Nations forces during the Korean War, then she underwent an extensive fleet rehabilitation and modernization overhaul in 1962. On 7 June 1965, Orleck assisted in the recovery of the Gemini IV space capsule.

During the Vietnam War, Orleck served as plane guard for aircraft carriers on "Yankee Station" in the Gulf of Tonkin, participated in Operation Sea Dragon, patrolled on search-and-rescue duties, and carried out naval gunfire support missions.

Orleck was decommissioned on 1 October 1982 and stricken from the Naval Vessel Register on 6 August 1987.

=== Turkish Navy (1982–2000) ===
Orleck was transferred to Turkey for service in the Turkish Navy. She was renamed TCG Yücetepe (D 345) in Turkish service.

=== Museum ship (since 2000) ===
On 12 August 2000, the Turkish government transferred Yücetepe to the Southeast Texas War Memorial and Heritage Foundation at Orange, Texas, for use as a memorial and museum under her old name, USS Orleck.

When Hurricane Rita struck the Texas coast in September 2005, Orleck was severely damaged. After repairs, Orleck was ready to return to her pier at Ochiltree-Inman Park, but the City of Orange refused to allow her to return. Orleck was temporarily relocated to Levingston Island, then moored north of Orange Harbor Island.

On 6 May 2009, the Lake Charles, Louisiana, City Council voted in favor of an ordinance authorizing the city to enter into a Cooperative Endeavor Agreement with USS Orleck. On 20 May 2010, she was moved to Lake Charles, Louisiana. The grand opening in Lake Charles occurred on 10 April 2011. In 2019, the ship was either going to be moved, sunk, or scrapped; however, the museum remained operational.

In 2019, following the failure of the USS Adams Association and the Jacksonville Naval Museum to acquire the USS Charles F. Adams (DDG-2) as a museum ship in Jacksonville, Florida, it was proposed to acquire Orleck and move her to the proposed berth that was obtained for the Charles F. Adams. The USS Adams Association studied Orleck and deemed that she would survive the tow from Lake Charles to Jacksonville.

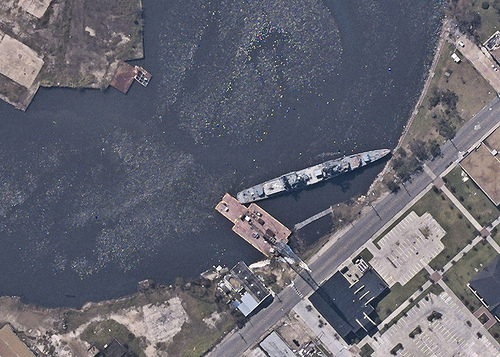
Museum ship USS Orleck aground after Hurricane Rita in 2005.

On 30 August 2019, the Jacksonville Naval Museum announced that the transfer of Orleck to Jacksonville had been approved, and it was waiting on finalizing plans with the Jacksonville city council.

In February 2020, the move to Jacksonville was confirmed. She was to remain open in Lake Charles until 1 March 2020, before closing in preparation for an inspection by the US Coast Guard for towing to dry dock in Texas for repairs before making the tow to Jacksonville.

The tow to Jacksonville was delayed by the COVID-19 pandemic. She broke loose from her mooring in the Calcasieu River during Hurricane Laura, drifting a mile downstream before drifting aground with some damage.

In August 2021, the Jacksonville City Council unanimously approved the ship to be moored in downtown Jacksonville.

In December 2021, she was towed from Lake Charles to Port Arthur, Texas, to be drydocked. Over the next few weeks, she was deemed to be in much better shape than expected and restoration work was done, which extended the ship's life by 15 years.

On 11 January 2022, ownership was officially transferred to the museum association in preparation for her tow and set-up in Jacksonville.

With restoration work completed, she passed all inspections by the US Coast Guard; on 17 March 2022, she left Port Arthur under tow to Jacksonville. She arrived in Jacksonville on 26 March 2022 and officially opened on 5 October 2022.
