= Künav Cave =

Cave in Turkey

- Künav Mağarası
- Location within Turkey
- Location: Kayadelen village, Varto, Turkey
- Coordinates: 39°11′1.43″N 41°35′9.10″E
- Depth: 159 m (522 ft)
- Length: 3,000 m (9,800 ft)
- Elevation: 1,800 m (5,900 ft)

Künav Cave (Turkish: Künav Mağarası) is a Karstic cave located near Kayadelen village of Varto district of Muş province, Turkey. The cave is 3 kilometers long and 15 km away from Varto district center.

The ceiling height of Künav Cave is around 35 meters in places and consists of two floors, and river-sized water passes through the lower floor. There are traces that it was used as a settlement in the early ages.

== Geology and geomorphology ==
Künav Cave was formed over time as a result of Görgü stream. The main creatures living in the cave are bats. It is a cave of fluvyo-karstic origin.
