= Kayalıdere Castle =

Massive stone fortification in Turkey

- Kayalıdere, Varto, Muş, Turkey

Site information
- Open to the public: Yes

Location
- Coordinates: 39°04′18″N 41°33′38″E

Site history
- Built: 764–735 BC

The Kayalıdere Castle (Turkish: Kayalıdere Kalesi), is a historical castle on a rocky hill in the Varto district of Muş. This castle was one of the most important checkpoints for the kingdom of Urartu.

Kayalıdere Castle is located on the hill that has an island appearance after the Alparslan 2 dam. Transportation to the castle can only be done by boat.

== History ==
Kayalıdere Castle is mostly known for Urartu Castle and Urartu Rock Tomb in the west. The castle and rock tomb, which is estimated to have been built during the period of Sardria II (764–735 BC), is the most robust structure of the Urartian period in Muş. Kayalıdere castle is one of the most important centers of the Murat river route, which provides the westward crossings of the Van-based Urartu kingdom.

== Excavations ==
During the excavations, 503 pottery items belonging to the Urartians were found.
