= Yurttutan, Varto =

Village in Muş Province, Turkey

Yurttutan
- Village
- Location within Turkey
- Coordinates: 39.07115°N 41.76966°E
- Country: Turkey
- Province: Muş
- District: Varto
- Population (2022): 427
- Time zone: UTC+3 (TRT)

Yurttutan is a village in the Varto District, Muş Province, in east Turkey. Its population is 427 (2022). It is 91 km from Muş province and 43 km from Varto town.

== Geology and geography ==
Yurttutan and the plateau used for animal husbandry are located on the Akdoğan Mountains. There are 2 mezra of Yurttutan called Derince and Toklu.

== Education ==
Hamurpet Imam Hatip Secondary School is located in Toklu mezra of Yurttutan.
