= Aşağıbüklü =

- Village
- Location within Turkey
- Coordinates: 38.929°N 41.890°E
- Country: Turkey
- Province: Muş
- District: Bulanık
- Population (2021): 286
- Time zone: UTC+3 (TRT)

Aşağıbüklü is a village of Bulanık District of Muş Province, eastern Turkey. Its population is 286 (2021). Aşağıbüklü is 100 km from Muş city and 56 km from Bulanık.

The postal code for the village is 49510.
