= Yarlısu, Varto =

Village in Muş Province, Turkey

Yarlısu
- Village
- Location within Turkey
- Coordinates: 39.26288°N 41.41397°E
- Country: Turkey
- Province: Muş
- District: Varto
- Population (2022): 48
- Time zone: UTC+3 (TRT)

Yarlısu is a village in the Varto District, Muş Province, in east Turkey. Its population is 48 (2022). It is 74 km from Muş city center and 14 km from Varto town.

== Geology and geography ==
Yarlısu and the plateau used for animal husbandry are located on the Bingöl Mountains.
