= Toklu, Varto =

Village in Muş Province, Turkey

Toklu
- Village
- Location within Turkey
- Coordinates: 39.05946°N 41.82557°E
- Country: Turkey
- Province: Muş
- District: Varto
- Population (2016): 168
- Time zone: UTC+3 (TRT)

Toklu (Kurdish: Mamakhig) is a hamlet of the village Yurttutan in the Varto District, Muş Province, in east Turkey. Alparslan 1 Dam was built near this village, which has a population of 168 (2016).

== History ==
The name of the village comes from 'mamukh' or 'mamkhi' meaning black thorn in Armenian.

== Education ==
Hamurpet Imam Hatip Secondary School is located in Toklu mezra of Yurttutan.
