= Sürügüden =

Village in Muş Province, Turkey

- Village
- Location within Turkey
- Coordinates: 38.91359°N 41.63876°E
- Country: Turkey
- Province: Muş
- District: Muş
- Population (2022): 473
- Time zone: UTC+3 (TRT)

Sürügüden (Armenian: Հացեկաց, romanized: Hatsekats) is a village in the Muş District, Muş Province, in east Turkey. Its population is 473 (2022).

== Geology and geography ==
Sürügüden and the plateau used for animal husbandry are located on the Otluk Mountains.

== History ==
On May 28, 1994, a shootout in the village occurred, killing 11 people, reportedly after Sürügüden's inhabitants "slapped three sheep a couple of times". After Turkey intervened, the governorship of Muş successfully ordered the relocation of roughly half of Sürügüden's population to a then-under construction Köykent settlement; the state told the relocated residents that their stay in the Köykent village was "temporary". It also planned to send them to a new village or reconcile them with villagers of Sürügüden, the latter which its villagers opposed. Later, it was found by METU and the Ministry of Public Works and Housing that the Köykent settlement was built on ground unstable against earthquakes. The Köykent settlement's houses were razed, but their inhabitants were not moved out and, as of 2000, stayed in that settlement, with no electricity and a lack of school.
