= Meşeiçi, Bulanık =

Village in Muş Province, Turkey

Meşeiçi
- Village
- Location within Turkey
- Coordinates: 39.11627°N 41.89756°E
- Country: Turkey
- Province: Muş
- District: Bulanık
- Population (2022): 650
- Time zone: UTC+3 (TRT)

Meşeiçi (Armenian: Ալիկուլաղ, romanized: Alikulagh) is a village in the Bulanık District, Muş Province, in east Turkey. Its population is 650 (2022). The village is populated by Kurds.

== History ==
Ancient Şahmiran Castle is located 2 km southwest of Meşeiçi and 1 km east of Esenler.

== Geology and geography ==
Meşeiçi consists of 2 Mezra: Ürünlü, and Beşevler. Meşeiçi and the plateau used for animal husbandry are located on the Akdoğan Mountains.

== Education ==
There is a primary school in the village.
