= Seçme, Bulanık =

Village in Muş Province, Turkey

Seçme
- Village
- Location within Turkey
- Coordinates: 39.14714°N 41.82747°E
- Country: Turkey
- Province: Muş
- District: Bulanık
- Population (2022): 426
- Time zone: UTC+3 (TRT)

Seçme is a village in the Bulanık District, Muş Province, in east Turkey. Its population is 426 (2022).

== Geology and geography ==
Seçme consists of 7 Mezra: Salihli, Çiçekli, Memet, Topluca, Sütlüce, Topağaç and Saliha Mezrası Osmanlı zamanında Büyük Müderris Seyyid Molla Ali Kosewi tarafından Kurulur. The old name of the village is Niftik. It is 150 kilometers from Muş city center and 45 kilometers from Bulanık district center. Seçme and the plateau used for animal husbandry are located on the Akdoğan Mountains.

== Education ==
There is a primary school in the village.
