= Yukarısızma =

Village in Muş Province, Turkey

- Village
- Location within Turkey
- Coordinates: 38.92643°N 41.67431°E
- Country: Turkey
- Province: Muş
- District: Muş
- Population (2022): 230
- Time zone: UTC+3 (TRT)

Yukarısızma (Armenian: Խարթոս, romanized: Khartos) is a village in the Muş District, Muş Province, in east Turkey. Its population is 230 (2022).

== Geology and geography ==
Yukarısızma and the plateau used for animal husbandry are located on the Otluk Mountains.
