= Aligedik =

Village in Muş Province, Turkey

- Village
- Location within Turkey
- Coordinates: 39.03706°N 41.62948°E
- Country: Turkey
- Province: Muş
- District: Muş
- Population (2022): 456
- Time zone: UTC+3 (TRT)

Aligedik (Armenian: Ալիգետիկ, romanized: Aligetik) is a village in the Muş District, Muş Province, in east Turkey. Its population is 456 (2022).

== Geology and geography ==
Aligedik and the plateau used for animal husbandry are located on the Otluk Mountains.

== Education ==
There is a primary school in the village.
