= Örenkent, Bulanık =

Village in Muş Province, Turkey

Örenkent
- Village
- Location within Turkey
- Coordinates: 39.02442°N 42.24163°E
- Country: Turkey
- Province: Muş
- District: Bulanık
- Population (2022): 1,394
- Time zone: UTC+3 (TRT)

Örenkent (Armenian: Խարաբաշեհիր, romanized: Kharabashehir) is a village in the Bulanık District, Muş Province, in east Turkey. It is 115 km from Muş city center and 8 km from Bulanık town. Its population is 1,394 (2022).

== Education ==
There is a primary school in the village.
