= Dumlusu =

Village in Muş Province, Turkey

- Village
- Location within Turkey
- Coordinates: 39.01526°N 41.53646°E
- Country: Turkey
- Province: Muş
- District: Muş
- Population (2022): 228
- Time zone: UTC+3 (TRT)

Dumlusu (Armenian: Սարգիսան, romanized: Sargisan) is a village in the Muş District, Muş Province, in east Turkey. Its population is 228 (2022).

== Geology and geography ==
The soil structure of the village, which has 60 households, consists of clay. Sometimes floods and landslides occur. It is 35 km away from the center of Muş.

== Education ==
There is a primary school in the village.
