= Üçtepe, Bulanik =

Üçtepe
- Village
- Location within Turkey
- Coordinates: 39.06725°N 42.34951°E
- Country: Turkey
- Province: Muş
- District: Bulanık
- Population (2021): 247
- Time zone: UTC+3 (TRT)
- Postal code: 49500

Üçtepe is a village in the Bulanık District of Muş Province, eastern Turkey. Its population is 247 (2021). It is 115 km from the city of Muş and 7 km from Bulanık town center.

== Education ==
There is a primary school in the village.
