= Başkent, Varto =

Village in Muş Province, Turkey

Başkent
- Village
- Location within Turkey
- Coordinates: 39.2112°N 41.56344°E
- Country: Turkey
- Province: Muş
- District: Varto
- Population (2022): 207
- Time zone: UTC+3 (TRT)

Başkent is a village in the Varto District, Muş Province, in east Turkey. It is 74 km from Muş center and 14 km from Varto town. Its population is 207 (2022).
