= Bostankent =

Village in Muş Province, Turkey

- Village
- Location within Turkey
- Coordinates: 39.0089°N 41.84093°E
- Country: Turkey
- Province: Muş
- District: Muş
- Population (2022): 1,596
- Time zone: UTC+3 (TRT)

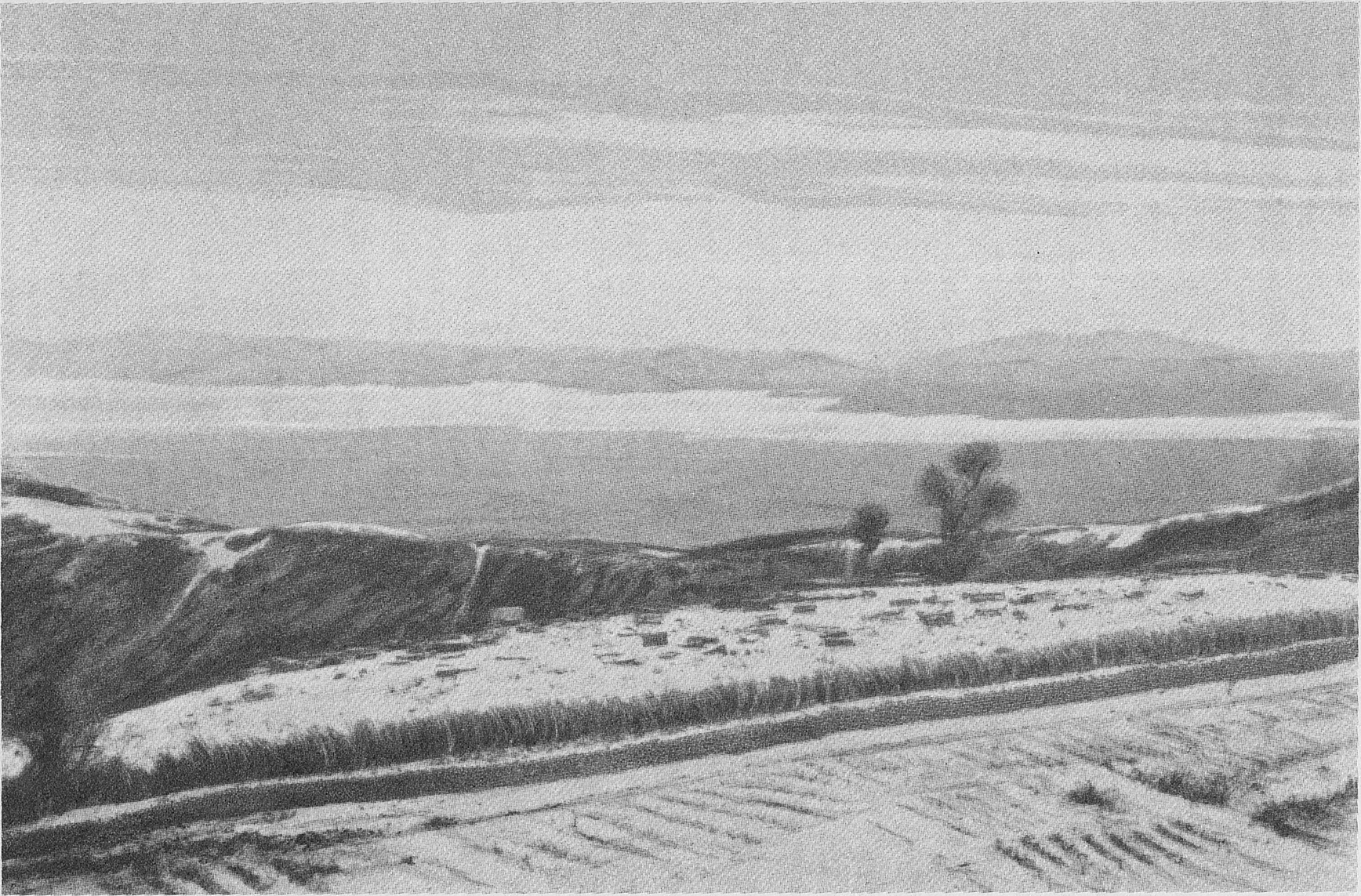
View south of the Mush plain from the terrace of the 4th century Armenian monastery of Surb Karapet in the Taron Province of historic Armenia (at the time of the photo in the Ottoman Empire, present day Turkey).

Bostankent (Armenian: Բոստանքանդ) is a village in the Muş District, Muş Province, in east Turkey. It is located near Alpaslan-1 Dam. Its population is 1,596 (2022).

== Geology and geography ==
Bostankent and the plateau used for animal husbandry are located on the Otluk Mountains.

== Education ==
There is a secondary school in the village.
