= Haksever, Varto =

Village in Muş Province, Turkey

Haksever
- Village
- Location within Turkey
- Coordinates: 39.10683°N 41.33486°E
- Country: Turkey
- Province: Muş
- District: Varto
- Population (2022): 876
- Time zone: UTC+3 (TRT)

Haksever is a village in the Varto District of the Muş Province in east Turkey. Its population is 876 (2022).

== Geology and geography ==
Haksever and the plateau used for animal husbandry are located on the Şerafettin Mountains.

== Education ==
There is a secondary school in the village.
