= Kaygıntaş, Varto =

Village in Muş Province, Turkey

Kaygıntaş
- Village
- Location within Turkey
- Coordinates: 39.06635°N 41.3969°E
- Country: Turkey
- Province: Muş
- District: Varto
- Population (2022): 238
- Time zone: UTC+3 (TRT)

Kaygıntaş is a village in the Varto District of the Muş Province in east Turkey. Its population is 238 (2022).

== Geology and geography ==
Kaygıntaş and the plateau used for animal husbandry are located on the Şerafettin Mountains.

== Education ==
There is a secondary school in the village.
