= Sarıdal =

Village in Muş Province, Turkey

- Village
- Location within Turkey
- Coordinates: 38.93682°N 41.64047°E
- Country: Turkey
- Province: Muş
- District: Muş
- Population (2022): 268
- Time zone: UTC+3 (TRT)

Sarıdal is a village in the Muş District, Muş Province, in east Turkey. Its population is 268 (2022).

== Geology and geography ==
Sarıdal and the plateau used for animal husbandry are located on the Otluk Mountains.
