= Lake Haçlı =

Lake in Turkey

- Location within Turkey
- Location: Gölyanı, Bulanık, Muş Province, East Turkey
- Coordinates: 39°01′N 42°18′E
- Type: Landslide dam, Fresh-water
- Basin countries: Turkey
- Surface area: 34.11 km^{2} (13.17 sq mi)
- Max. depth: 7 metres (23 ft)
- Surface elevation: 1,600 metres (5,200 ft)

Lake Haçlı, also known as Lake Bulanık, is a fresh-water lake in Turkey. The lake is to the south of Bulanık district of Muş Province. Its distance to Bulanık is 10 kilometres (6.2 mi).

It is situated on a high plateau of 1,600 metres (5,200 ft)

It got her name from the Haçlı village in the south. The word Haçlı means Cross in Turkish. There are fertile grasslands around the lake. Its area is about 10 square kilometres (3.9 sq mi) and its maximum depth is 7 metres (23 ft). The area and the depth don't fluctuate between summer and winter. The lake is fed by Şeyhkorum Creek and some smaller creeks.

== History ==
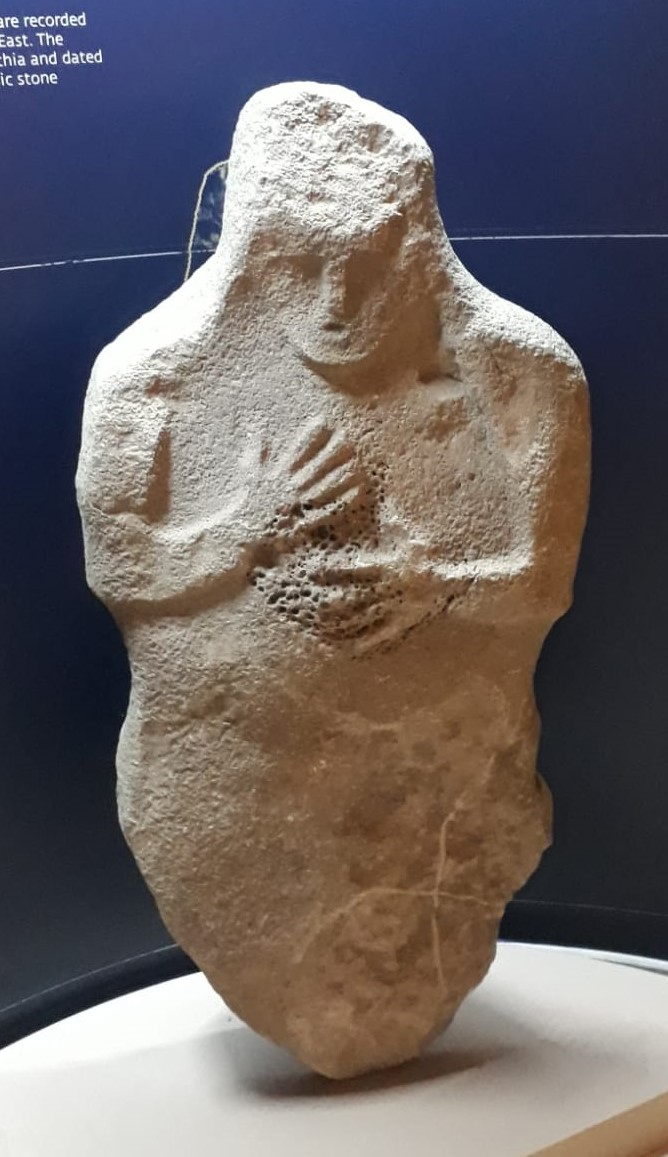
A Urartian Bulanık Stele, It was found in the village of Gölyanı near Lake Haçlı.

== Geology and geography ==
The lake is fed by more than 10 small streams, the vast majority of which descend as snow water from the Bilican Mountains in spring.

== Fauna ==
Gadwall, ruddy shelduck, demoiselle crane are among the bird population of the lake. Animal husbandry is one of the major economic activities around the lake. Fishing is only of minor importance.

== See also ==
- Lake Nazik
