= Cevizlidere, Muş =

Village in Turkey

Cevizlidere
- Village
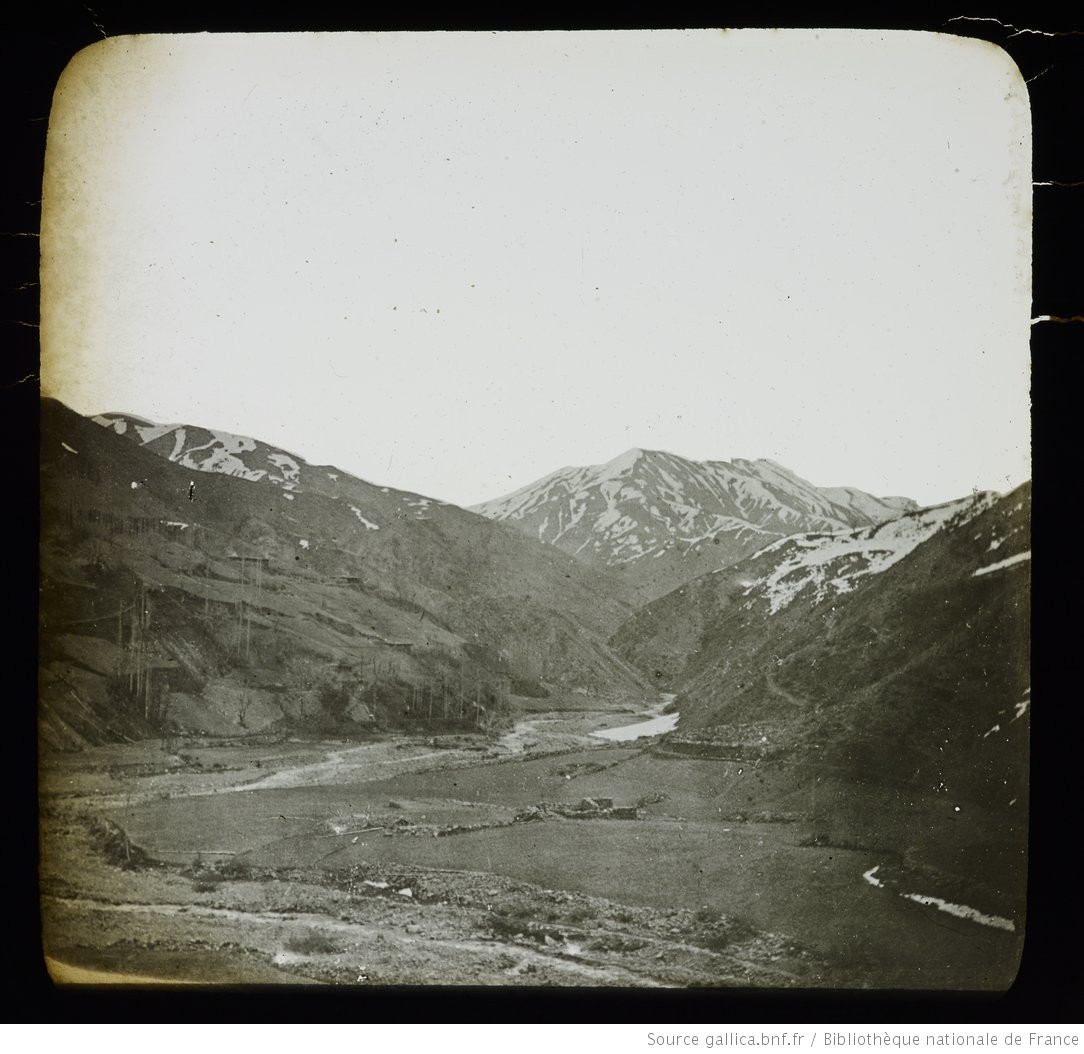
- Old image of the village (1902-1903)

- Location within Turkey
- Coordinates: 38°35′20″N 41°20′39″E
- Country: Turkey
- Province: Muş
- District: Muş
- Population (2022): 343
- Time zone: UTC+3 (TRT)

Cevizlidere (Kurdish: Gelîguzan, lit. 'Valley of nuts') is a village in the Muş District of Muş Province in Turkey. The village is populated by Kurds and had a population of 343 in 2022.

It was formerly populated by Armenians and attacked by Ottoman forces in 1894 where most of the population was massacred. From 1994 on, the village was depopulated for a while by Turkish authorities during the Kurdish–Turkish conflict.

== History ==
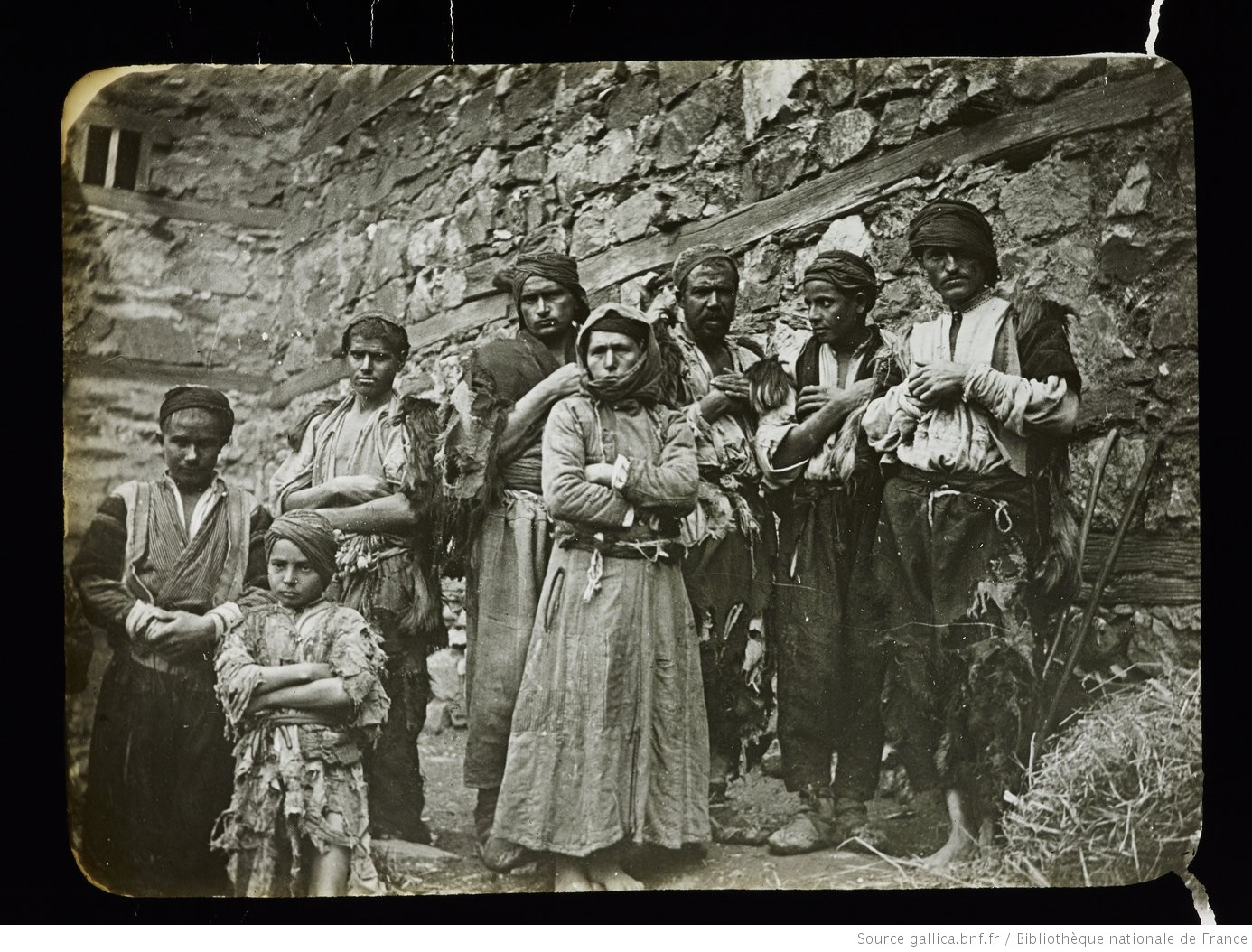
Armenians of Cevizlidere (1902-1903)

The village was part of Sasun and mainly populated by Apostolic Armenians. In mid-August 1894, many Armenians from the vicinity fled to Cevizlidere for safety as skirmishes were taking place with nomad Kurds who had been approached by Ottoman soldiers for support.

Later that month, a Kurdish ally named Khushman Agha warned the locals of an attack by Ottoman forces and many women and children fled to the mountains, while others took up weapons to defend the village. Days later, Ottoman forces entered the village and set fire to one part of the village as the soldiers were instructed to kill anyone. By the end of September, most of the villagers were murdered and Zeki Pasha ultimately ordered the end of the violence. Ultimately, around two thousand locals, including women and children, had been murdered.

A European delegation visited the village in 1895 and stated that 120 houses had been destroyed by fire and that the living condition was miserable with the only shelter being makeshift huts.

The Armenian population was reported to be 884 individuals in 129 households in 1902, and 1,030 individuals in 143 households, in 1909.

== Population ==
Historic population figures of the village:

Historical population
| Year | Pop. | ±% |
|---|---|---|
| 1902 | 884 | — |
| 1909 | 1,030 | +16.5% |
| 1965 | 347 | −66.3% |
| 1970 | 325 | −6.3% |
| 1980 | 382 | +17.5% |
| 1990 | 518 | +35.6% |
| 1997 | 196 | −62.2% |
| 2007 | 402 | +105.1% |
| 2022 | 343 | −14.7% |

== See also ==
- 1894 Sasun rebellion
