= Suluca, Muş =

Village in Muş, Turkey

Suluca Komer
- Village
- Location within Turkey
- Coordinates: 38°45′31″N 41°22′6.55″E
- Country: Turkey
- Province: Muş
- District: Muş
- Population (2022): 359
- Time zone: UTC+3 (TRT)

Suluca (Armenian: Գոմեր, romanized: Gomer/Komer), also known as Komer, is a village of Muş District, Muş Province, eastern Turkey. Its population is 359 (2022).

== Population ==
Known as Komer to the Armenians, Church records state that in 1890, there were 70 Armenian households in the town, and a second survey indicated there were 38 Kurdish households. By 1902 records show only 58 Armenian households and then in In 1910, church records recorded 60 Armenian households and a similar record in 1914.
