= Kutlugün, Muş =

Village in Muş Province, Turkey

Kutlugün
- Village
- Location within Turkey
- Coordinates: 39.05602°N 41.40735°E
- Country: Turkey
- Province: Muş
- District: Muş
- Population (2022): 58
- Time zone: UTC+3 (TRT)

Kutlugün (Armenian: Բայրաման, romanized: Bayraman) is a village in the Muş District, Muş Province, in east Turkey. Its population is 58 (2022).

== Education ==
There is a primary school in the village.
