= Bulanık Stele =

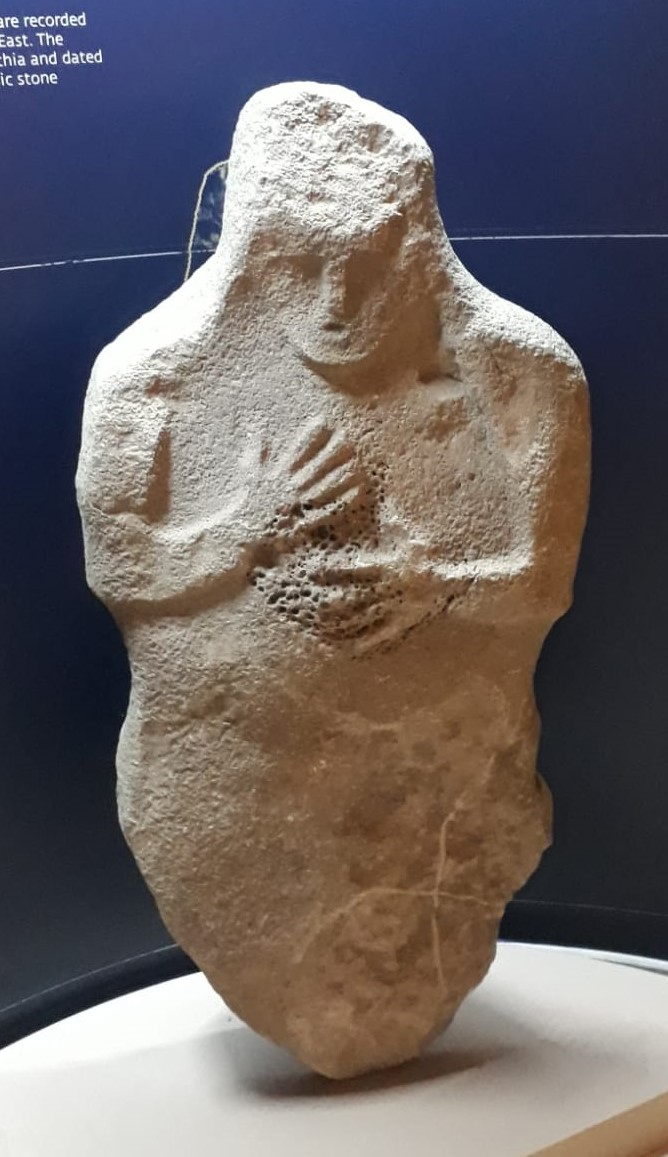
- Material: Limestone
- Discovered: February 2, 2013
- Present location: Bitlis Ahlat Museum

The Bulanık Stele (Turkish: Bulanık Steli) is an anthropomorphic (human) sculpture, registered in the Bulanık district of Muş, made of limestone, measuring 1.4 x 0.6 m. The work is currently exhibited in Bitlis Ahlat Museum.

== Finding and seizing ==
The artifact was seized during a historical artifact smuggling operation carried out in the Vangesör hamlet of Gölyanı Village in Bulanık on February 2, 2013. While five people who smuggled the work were detained, the statue was sent to Bitlis Ahlat Museum.
