= Karaağıl, Bulanık =

Village in Muş Province, Turkey

Karaağıl
- Village
- Location within Turkey
- Coordinates: 39.13994°N 42.08662°E
- Country: Turkey
- Province: Muş
- District: Bulanık
- Population (2022): 1,516
- Time zone: UTC+3 (TRT)

Karaağıl (Armenian: Գարաղել, romanized: Garaghel) is a village in the Bulanık District, Muş Province, in east Turkey. Its population is 1,516 (2022).

== History ==
The village was populated by Armenians at the beginning of the 20th century. Later it was settled by Muslim Ossetians and Kurds.

== Education ==
There is a primary school and Karaağıl Imam Hatip Secondary School in the village.
