= Kayadelen, Varto =

Village in Muş Province, Turkey

Kayadelen
- Village
- Location within Turkey
- Coordinates: 39.17993°N 41.5905°E
- Country: Turkey
- Province: Muş
- District: Varto
- Population (2022): 38
- Time zone: UTC+3 (TRT)

Kayadelen is a village in the Varto District of the Muş Province in east Turkey. Its population is 38 (2022).

== Geology and geography ==
There is Kayadelen karstic cave in the village.
