= Gölköy, Muş =

Village in Muş, Turkey

Gölköy
- Village
- Location within Turkey
- Coordinates: 38°51′N 41°15′E
- Country: Turkey
- Province: Muş
- District: Muş
- Population (2022): 323
- Time zone: UTC+3 (TRT)

Gölköy (Armenian: Գյոլ, romanized: Gyol) is a village in the Muş District, Muş Province, eastern Turkey. Its population is 323 (2022). Gölköy is 41 km from the city of Mus.

The economy of the village is based on agriculture and the village has drinking water and sewerage, electricity and fixed telephone.
