= Akçakaynak =

Village in Muş Province, Turkey

- Village
- Location within Turkey
- Coordinates: 39.17331°N 41.98907°E
- Country: Turkey
- Province: Muş
- District: Bulanık
- Population (2022): 94
- Time zone: UTC+3 (TRT)

Akçakaynak is a village in the Bulanık District, Muş Province, in east Turkey. Its population is 94 (2022).

== Geology and geography ==
Akçakaynak and the plateau used for animal husbandry are located on the Akdoğan Mountains.
