= Karaköy, Varto =

Village in Muş Province, Turkey

Karaköy
- Village
- Location within Turkey
- Coordinates: 39.0909°N 41.6832°E
- Country: Turkey
- Province: Muş
- District: Varto
- Population (2022): 599
- Time zone: UTC+3 (TRT)

Karaköy is a village in the Varto District of the Muş Province in east Turkey. As of 2022, it had a population of 599 people.

== Education ==
There is a secondary school in the village.
