= Kayalıkale, Varto =

Village in Muş Province, Turkey

Kayalıkale
- Village
- Location within Turkey
- Coordinates: 39.0738°N 41.59986°E
- Country: Turkey
- Province: Muş
- District: Varto
- Population (2022): 314
- Time zone: UTC+3 (TRT)

Kayalıkale (Armenian: Խանզուրիկ Վերին, romanized: Khnzori Verin) is a village in the Varto District of the Muş Province in east Turkey. Its population is 314 (2022).

== History ==
The Kurdish name of the village is Kurdish: خنزۆرا ژۆر, romanized: Xinzora Jor. The Armenian and Kurdish names derive from Armenian: խնձոր, romanized: khndzor, lit. 'apple', a Hurrian loanword likely itself borrowed from Dagestani.

== Geology and geography ==
Kayalıkale and the plateau used for animal husbandry are located on the Akdoğan Mountains.

== Education ==
There is a secondary school in the village.
