= Yeşilpınar, Varto =

Village in Muş Province, Turkey

Yeşilpınar
- Village
- Location within Turkey
- Coordinates: 39.0944°N 41.631°E
- Country: Turkey
- Province: Muş
- District: Varto
- Population (2022): 305
- Time zone: UTC+3 (TRT)

Yeşilpınar is a village in the Varto District of the Muş Province in east Turkey. As of 2022, it had a population of 305 people.

== History ==
The old name of the village is mentioned in the records of 1928 as Viranc.
