= Mercimekkale Mound =

Archaeological site in Turkey

- Location within Turkey
- 38.958321°N 41.523083°E
- Type: Hill
- Location: Turkey
- Region: Mercimekkale, Muş Province

Mercimekkale Mound (Turkish: Mercimekkale Höyüğü); is an archaeological site located 22 km north of Muş city center. The mound is on the east bank of the Murat River. It is located within the borders of Mercimekkale.

There is a castle belonging to the Eastern Roman Empire (Byzantine) period in the mound. The castle was built for communication, mail, observation purposes. Today, the site is completely covered with soil. There is more than one mound around Mercimekkale mound. Mounds are directly related to the Hurrians and Urartians.

For the first time, it was declared a first degree protected area with the decision of the Van Cultural Heritage Preservation Board on June 27, 1990.
