= Yücetepe, Muş =

Village in Muş Province, Turkey

Yücetepe
- Village
- Location within Turkey
- Coordinates: 38°58′20″N 41°27′04″E
- Country: Turkey
- Province: Muş
- District: Muş
- Population (2022): 1,150
- Time zone: UTC+3 (TRT)

Yücetepe (Armenian: Դերըկ, Kurdish: Dêrik) is a village in Muş District, Muş Province, eastern Turkey. The village is populated by Kurds and had a population of 1,150 in 2022.

== History ==
Ashtishat is an archaeological site in Yücetepe. A survey in 1902 estimated the population to be 102 Armenians and an estimate in 1910 concluded that figure had doubled. In 1914, on the eve of the Armenian genocide, the figure may have been as high as 350.
