= Akpınar, Muş =

Village in Muş Province, Turkey

Akpınar
- Village
- Location within Turkey
- Coordinates: 39.02589°N 41.50866°E
- Country: Turkey
- Province: Muş
- District: Muş
- Population (2022): 470
- Time zone: UTC+3 (TRT)

Akpınar is a village in the Muş District, Muş Province, in east Turkey. Akpınar Village is located near Alpaslan-2 Dam. Its population is 470 (2022).

== Education ==
There is a primary school in the village.
