= Karapınar, Varto =

Village in Muş Province, Turkey

Karapınar
- Village
- Location within Turkey
- Coordinates: 39.09388°N 41.73419°E
- Country: Turkey
- Province: Muş
- District: Varto
- Elevation: 2,400 m (7,900 ft)
- Population (2022): 261
- Time zone: UTC+3 (TRT)

Karapınar is a village in the Varto District of the Muş Province in east Turkey. Its population is 261 (2022). There are Akdoğan Lakes in the east of the village.

== Geology and geography ==
Karapınar and the plateau used for animal husbandry are located on the Akdoğan Mountains. The village is located at an altitude of 2,400 meters.

== Education ==
There is a secondary school in the village.
