= Mercimekkale, Muş =

Village in Muş Province, Turkey

Mercimekkale
- Village
- Location within Turkey
- Coordinates: 38.93637°N 41.50395°E
- Country: Turkey
- Province: Muş
- District: Muş
- Elevation: 1,345 m (4,413 ft)
- Population (2022): 536
- Time zone: UTC+3 (TRT)

Mercimekkale (Armenian: Ծխավու, romanized: Dskhavu) is a village in the Muş District, Muş Province, in east Turkey. Within the boundaries of the village, there is the Mercimekkale Mound, one of the twenty-eight mounds in Muş. Its population is 536 (2022).

== Geology and geography ==
It is 22 km away from the center of Muş and is located on the Muş Erzurum highway connection. The altitude is 1345.

=== Flora ===
Tree species in Mercimekkale include poplar, willow, pine, walnut, hawthorn, wild pear, wild oak, and maple.

== Education ==
There is a primary school in the village.
