= Üçdere, Muş =

Üçdere
- Village
- Location within Turkey
- Coordinates: 38°44′00″N 41°29′28″E
- Country: Turkey
- Province: Muş
- District: Muş
- Population (2022): 753
- Time zone: UTC+3 (TRT)

Üçdere (Armenian: Օղունք, romanized: Oghunk) is a village in Muş District, Muş Province, eastern Turkey. Its population is 753 (2022). It is located 6 kilometers from the center of Muṣ.

== History ==
Human settlement has been present in the Muş plain for about 10,000 years. During the Middle Ages, Muş was the center of the Taron kingdom. In the late 8th century, the area came under the control of the Armenian Bagratid (Bagratuni) dynasty, until it was captured and annexed by the Byzantine Empire in 969. In the 11th century, the town was ruled by Islamic dynasties such as the Ahlatshahs. In the 1500s, the Ottomans took control of the area. During the Armenian genocide of 1915, the indigenous Armenian population of the region was exterminated. The town was formerly known as Tsoghounk, until World War I. The town was occupied by the Russian Empire in 1916 and was recaptured by Turkish troops on 30 April 1917.

Today, the economy of the village depends on agriculture and animal husbandry. There is a primary school, electricity and landline telephone in the village.

A number of ruins dot the landscape near the village including the Arakelots Monastery, Surp Marineh Church, Mush, Surb Karapet Monastery. Mosques like the Alaeddin Bey (18th century), Haci Seref (17th century), and Ulu Mosque (14th century). Caravanserai such as the "Yıldızlı Han" (13th century) which was destroyed in 1916 and the now almost completely ruined "Arslanli Han" can be found in the area. The bathhouse and fountain of Alaeddin Bey as well as the tombs of Muslim saints are also located around Üçdere.
