= Derecik, Muş =

Derecik
- Village
- Location within Turkey
- Coordinates: 38°41′05″N 41°33′24″E
- Country: Turkey
- Province: Muş
- District: Muş
- Population (2022): 605
- Time zone: UTC+3 (TRT)

Derecik (Armenian: Հավատորիկ, romanized: Havatorik) is a village in Muş District, Muş Province, eastern Turkey. Its population is 605 (2022). Derecik is located 13 km away from Mus township.

== History ==
=== Name ===
The Armenian name for the village was Havadarig or Havadorik not Derecik.

=== Population ===
In 1890, the Armenian church recorded one church and 90 Armenian households in the village, as well as 160 Kurdish households with similar numbers recorded in 1902. The church records state 120 Armenian households in 1910 and on the eve of the genocide 165 households.
