= Üçsırt =

Village in Muş Province, Turkey

- Village
- Location within Turkey
- Coordinates: 38.97608°N 41.76669°E
- Country: Turkey
- Province: Muş
- District: Muş
- Population (2022): 490
- Time zone: UTC+3 (TRT)

Üçsırt (Armenian: Սեգրան, romanized: Segran) is a village in the Muş District, Muş Province, in east Turkey. Its population is 490 (2022).

== Geology and geography ==
Üçsırt and the plateau used for animal husbandry are located on the Otluk Mountains. The village is 56 km away from the center of Muş.
