= Ünaldı, Varto =

Village in Muş Province, Turkey

Ünaldı
- Village
- Location within Turkey
- Coordinates: 39.14557°N 41.69336°E
- Country: Turkey
- Province: Muş
- District: Varto
- Population (2022): 71
- Time zone: UTC+3 (TRT)

Ünaldı or İskender (Ancient Greek: Ἀλέξανδρος, romanized: Alexandros; is a village in the Varto District, Muş Province, in east Turkey. Its population is 71 (2022). Ünaldı is located near Lake Hamurpet.

== Geology and geography ==
Ünaldı and the plateau used for animal husbandry are located on the Akdoğan Mountains.
