= Kayalıdere, Varto =

Village in Muş Province, Turkey

Kayalıdere
- Village
- Location within Turkey
- Coordinates: 39.0653°N 41.5784°E
- Country: Turkey
- Province: Muş
- District: Varto
- Population (2022): 89
- Time zone: UTC+3 (TRT)

Kayalıdere (Armenian: Խանզուրիկ Ներքին, romanized: Khnzorik Nerkin) is a village in the Varto District, Muş Province, in east Turkey. Its population is 89 (2022).

== History ==
The old name of the village is Aşağı Hınzor in the 1928 records, and in Armenian the word "Khndzor" means "apple". Today, the village is on the borders of Varto district of Muş and is mostly known for Urartu Kayalıdere Castle and Urartu Rock Tomb in the west. The castle and rock tomb, which is estimated to have been built during the period of Sardria II (764-735 BC), is the most robust structure of the Urartian period in Muş. Kayalıdere castle is one of the most important centers of the Murat river route, which provides the westward crossings of the Van-based Urartu kingdom.
