= Uzgörür =

- Municipality
- Location in Turkey
- Coordinates: 38°56′N 42°05′E
- Country: Turkey
- Province: Muş
- District: Bulanık
- Population (2022): 2,201
- Time zone: UTC+3 (TRT)

Uzgörür is a town (belde) in the Bulanık District, Muş Province, Turkey. Its population is 2,201 (2022).
