= Erdoğan, Varto =

Village in Muş Province, Turkey

Erdoğan
- Village
- Location within Turkey
- Coordinates: 39.1021°N 41.804°E
- Country: Turkey
- Province: Muş
- District: Varto
- Population (2022): 299
- Time zone: UTC+3 (TRT)

Erdoğan is a village in the Varto District, Muş Province, in east Turkey. Its population is 299 (2022). The village is located south of the small Akdoğan lake.

== History ==
The old name of the village is Avrîz in the records of 1928, and the word "avrêz" means "stream" in Kurmanci.

== Geology and geomorphology ==
Floods sometimes occur in the village with the overflow of streams coming from the Hamurpet Mountains and Mount Kolibaba. Erdoğan and the plateau used for animal husbandry are located on the Akdoğan Mountains.

== Education ==
There is a primary school in the village.
