= Kırköy, Muş =

Kırköy
- Municipality
- Location in Turkey
- Coordinates: 38°49′53″N 41°39′30″E
- Country: Turkey
- Province: Muş
- District: Muş
- Population (2022): 1,801
- Time zone: UTC+3 (TRT)

Kırköy (Armenian: Ցրոնք, romanized: Tsronk) is a town (belde) in the Muş District, Muş Province, Turkey. Its population is 1,801 (2022).
