= Konakkuran, Malazgirt =

Konakkuran
- Municipality
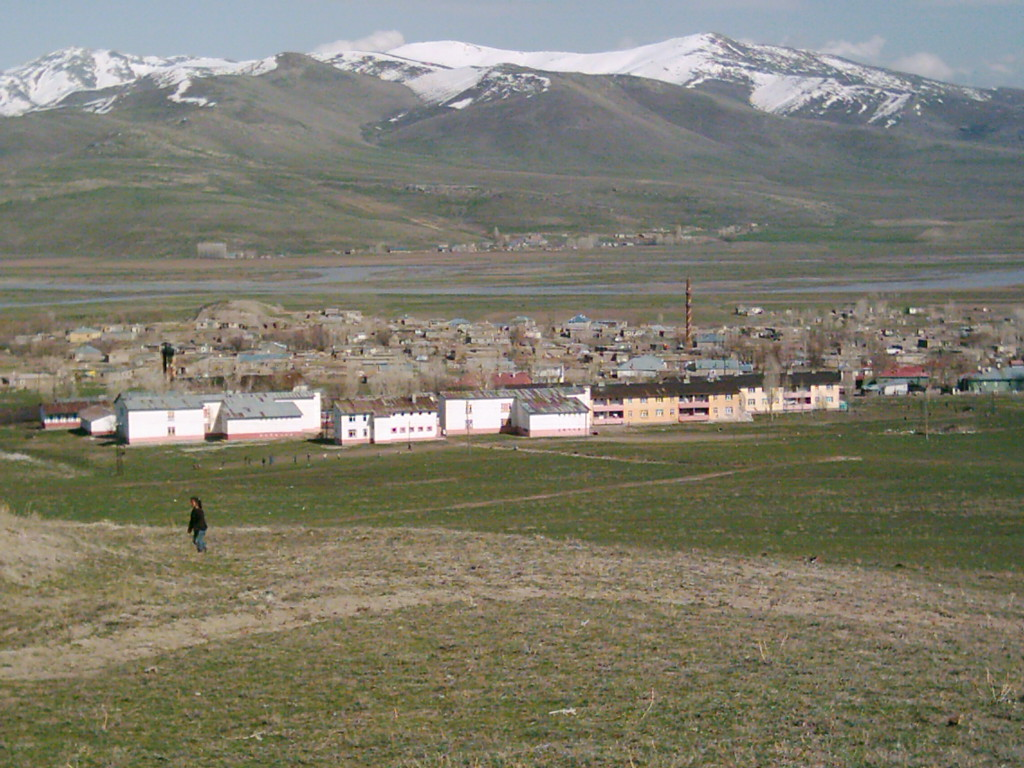
- Konakkuran

- Location within Turkey
- Coordinates: 39°16′52″N 42°30′27″E
- Country: Turkey
- Province: Muş
- District: Malazgirt
- Population (2022): 1,475
- Time zone: UTC+3 (TRT)

Konakkuran (Armenian: Տուկնուկ, romanized: Tuknuk) is a town (belde) in the Malazgirt District, Muş Province, Turkey.

== Population ==
According to the Turkish Statistical Institute (TurkStat), Konakkuran had a population of 1,475 in 2022.
