= Altınova, Korkut =

Altınova
- Municipality
- Location in Turkey
- Coordinates: 38°40′57″N 41°56′01″E
- Country: Turkey
- Province: Muş
- District: Korkut
- Population (2022): 2,587
- Time zone: UTC+3 (TRT)

Altınova (Armenian name: Վարդենիս, Vardenis) is a town (belde) in the Korkut District, Muş Province, Turkey. Its population is 2,587 (2022).
