= Sungu, Muş =

Sungu
- Municipality
- Location in Turkey
- Coordinates: 38°44′56″N 41°36′32″E
- Country: Turkey
- Province: Muş
- District: Muş
- Population (2022): 5,903
- Time zone: UTC+3 (TRT)

Sungu (Armenian: Նորշեն, romanized: Norshen) is a town (belde) in the Muş District, Muş Province, Turkey. Its population is 5,903 (2022).
