= Akçatepe, Varto =

Village in Muş Province, Turkey

Akçatepe
- Village
- Location within Turkey
- Coordinates: 39.0869°N 41.8387°E
- Country: Turkey
- Province: Muş
- District: Varto
- Population (2022): 272
- Time zone: UTC+3 (TRT)

Akçatepe is a village in the Varto District of the Muş Province in east Turkey. As of 2022, it had a population of 272 people.

== History ==
The old name of the village is Darabi, which means "willow" in Kurmanci in the records of 1902, and "Darabii Anér", which means "Aner willow" in the 1928 records.

== Geology and geomorphology ==
Floods sometimes occur in the village with the overflow of streams coming from the Mount Kolibaba.
