= Erentepe, Bulanık =

Erentepe
- Municipality
- Location in Turkey
- Coordinates: 39°00′49″N 42°03′24″E
- Country: Turkey
- Province: Muş
- District: Bulanık
- Population (2022): 3,596
- Time zone: UTC+3 (TRT)

Erentepe (Armenian: Լիզ, romanized: Liz) is a town (belde) in the Bulanık District, Muş Province, Turkey. Its population is 3,596 (2022).
