= Bulanık District =

District of Muş Province, Turkey

- District
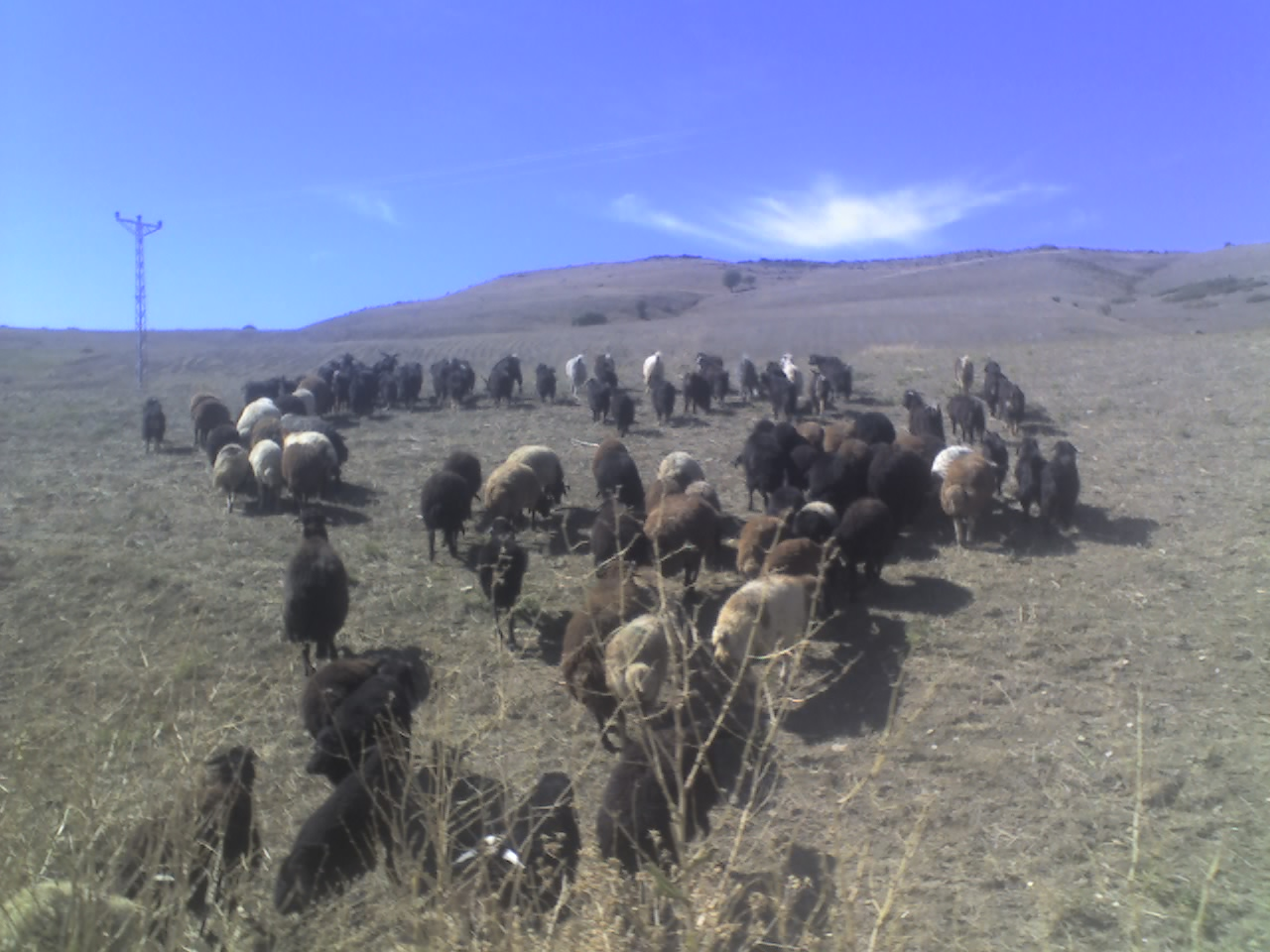
- Bulanık countryside near Çataklı

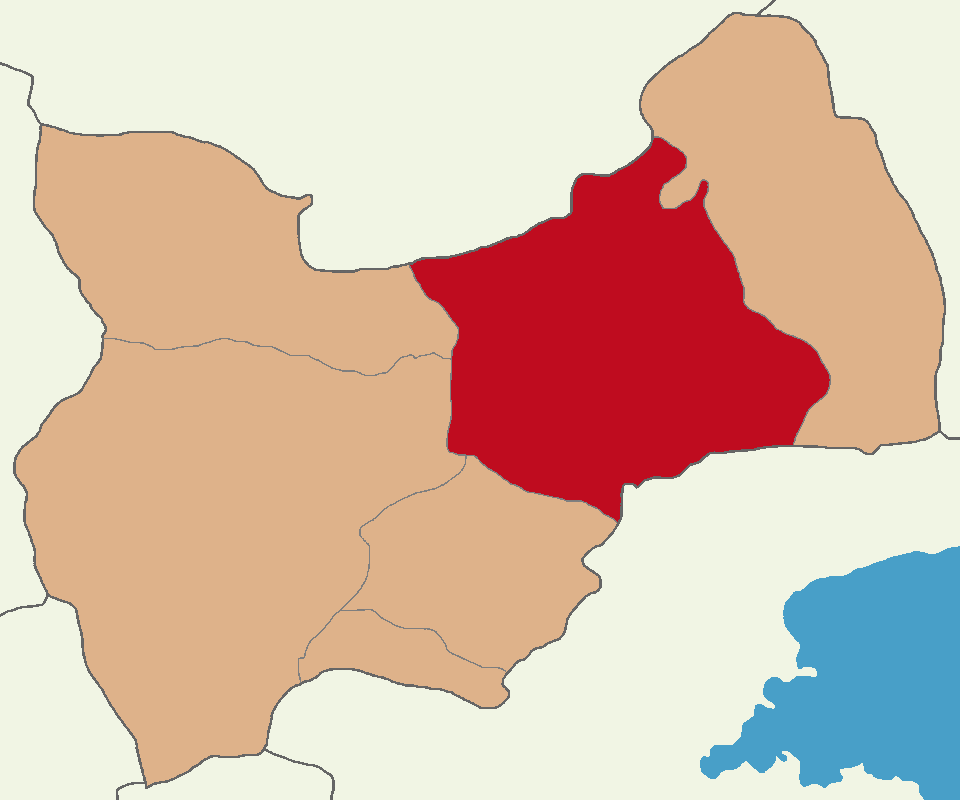
- Map showing Bulanık District in Muş Province

- Location within Turkey
- Coordinates: 39°06′N 42°16′E
- Country: Turkey
- Province: Muş
- Seat: Bulanık

Government
  - Kaymakam: Oğuzhan Ocak
- Area: 1,948 km^{2} (752 sq mi)
- Population (2022): 74,591
  - Density: 38.29/km^{2} (99.17/sq mi)
- Time zone: UTC+3 (TRT)
- Website: www.bulanik.gov.tr

Bulanık District is a district of the Muş Province of Turkey. Its seat is the town of Bulanık. Its area is 1,948 km^{2}, and its population is 74,591 (2022).

== Geography ==
The borders of Bulanık district end in Göztepe Mountain in the northwest and are surrounded by Akdoğan Mountains from Varto border to Hınıs and Karaçoban district in the north. The district is located at the northeastern foot of the Bilican Mountains.

=== Fauna ===
The last 11 individuals of the Demoiselle crane living in Turkey live in the Bulanık Plain.

== Tourism ==
The touristic places in Bulanık district are Lake Haçlı, Bilican Mountains and Esenlik Mosque.

== Composition ==
There are 7 municipalities in Bulanık District:

- Bulanık
- Elmakaya
- Erentepe
- Rüstemgedik
- Sarıpınar
- Uzgörür
- Yoncalı

There are 55 villages in Bulanık District:

- Adıvar
- Akçaarmut
- Akçakaynak
- Altınoluk
- Arakonak
- Aşağıbüklü
- Balotu
- Bostancılar
- Büngüldek
- Cankurtaran
- Çataklı
- Çaygeldi
- Değirmensuyu
- Demirkapı
- Doğantepe
- Dokuzpınar
- Ericek
- Esenlik
- Eskiyol
- Gölyanı
- Göztepe
- Gümüşpınar
- Günbatmaz
- Gündüzü
- Günyurdu
- Han
- Hoşgeldi
- Karaağıl
- Karaburun
- Karacaören
- Kırkgöze
- Köprüyolu
- Kotanlı
- Koyunağılı
- Kurganlı
- Meşeiçi
- Molladavut
- Mollakent
- Oğlakkaya
- Okçular
- Olurdere
- Örenkent
- Samanyolu
- Şatırlar
- Seçme
- Şehittahir
- Şehitveren
- Sıradere
- Söğütlü
- Sultanlı
- Toklular
- Üçtepe
- Yazbaşı
- Yemişen
- Yokuşbaşı
