= Esenler, Varto =

Village in Muş Province, Turkey

Esenler
- Village
- Location within Turkey
- Coordinates: 39.0872°N 41.861°E
- Country: Turkey
- Province: Muş
- District: Varto
- Population (2022): 314
- Time zone: UTC+3 (TRT)

Esenler is a village in the Varto District of the Muş Province in east Turkey. As of 2022, it had a population of 314 people. It is located 48 km (30 mi) from Varto and 96 km (60 mi) from the centre of Muş.

== Population ==
Historical population
Year	Pop.	±% p.a.
1997	326	—
2007	358	+0.94%
2012	384	+1.41%
2017	338	−2.52%
2022	314	−1.46%
Source: 1997 census and TÜIK (2007-2022)

== Historical sites ==
The architectural remains of the Şahmiran Kalesi, a castle from the Urartian period, is approximately 2 km (1.2 mi) southeast of the village. The castle is at 39°5′22.15″N 41°52′19.28″E.
