= Korkut =

Korkut Têlî
- Municipality
- Location in Turkey
- Coordinates: 38°44′19″N 41°46′58″E
- Country: Turkey
- Province: Muş
- District: Korkut

Government
  - Mayor: Sami Pekbay (AKP)
- Elevation: 1,300 m (4,300 ft)
- Population (2022): 3,409
- Time zone: UTC+3 (TRT)
- Area code: 0436

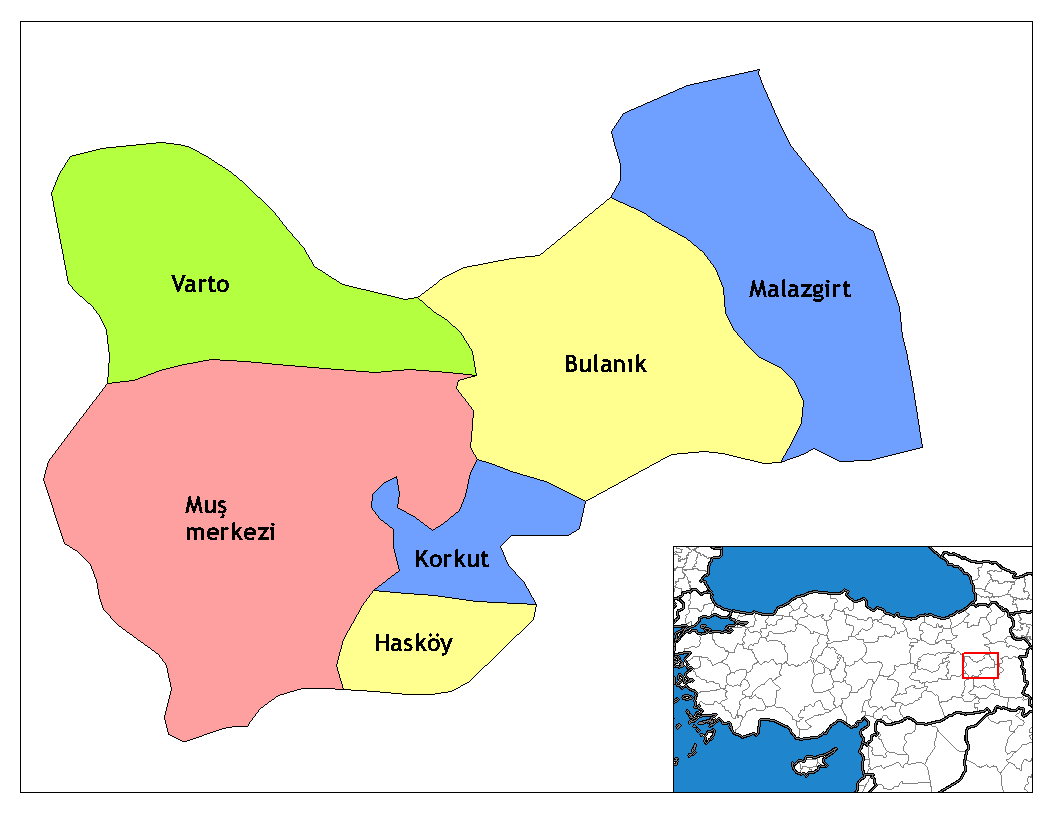
Map of the districts of Muş province in Turkey

Korkut (Armenian: Թիլ, romanized: Til, Kurdish: Têlî) is a town in Muş Province of Turkey. It is the seat of Korkut District. Its population is 3,409 (2022). The mayor is Sami Pekbay (AKP).

== History ==
Human settlement of the area is at least 10,000 years. Korkut has a tell from which the town derived its old name. This tell is estimated to be dated to the Old Bronze Age (around 3000 BC) but has not been examined archaeologically. In the 9th century BC, the area was part of the Urartu state.

Apart from the Kepenek Castle inscription, another inscription proving the existence of the Urartian Kingdom in the geography of Muş is the Alazlı/Tirmet inscription. The inscription in question is located 25.5 km east of Muş province and 6.2 km south of Korkut district. In the inscription, the war fought by the Urartian king Menua is mentioned:

Menua, the son of İşpuini, brought this stone to our Lord Haldi. he sewed. Tann Haldi went on a military expedition with his spear. He captured the city of Trtimi in the territory of the country of Urme.

The Armenian Taron kingdom ruled the town from the 4th century until the beginning of the 9th century, and the Christian diocese of Taron still holds nominal sway in the area as a titular see. In the 9th century, the town came under the control of a rival Armenian kingdom the Bagratians. This lasted until, In 967, the Byzantine Empire took control of western Anatolyia.

Seyit İbrahim Türk took the town in the 11th century, and it was about this time that the earliest references to the name Til are recorded.

Legend holds that The Byzantine emperor Basileios who was elected Byzantine emperor in 867, was originally a Til peasant.

Records of the Armenian church records that in 1890 there were 40 Armenian households in the village and 20 Kurdish. Although the church records show that by 1910 there were only 20 Armenian households and 1000 Kurdish the true figure is probably about 50 Armenian households. The Armenian church records that at the Armenian Genocide there were 52 Armenian households.

Before World War I the town had a church building dedicated to the Holy Mother of God (Surp Asdvadzadzin).

The name of the town was changed to Korkut in 1964.
