= Muş District =

District of Muş Province, Turkey

- District
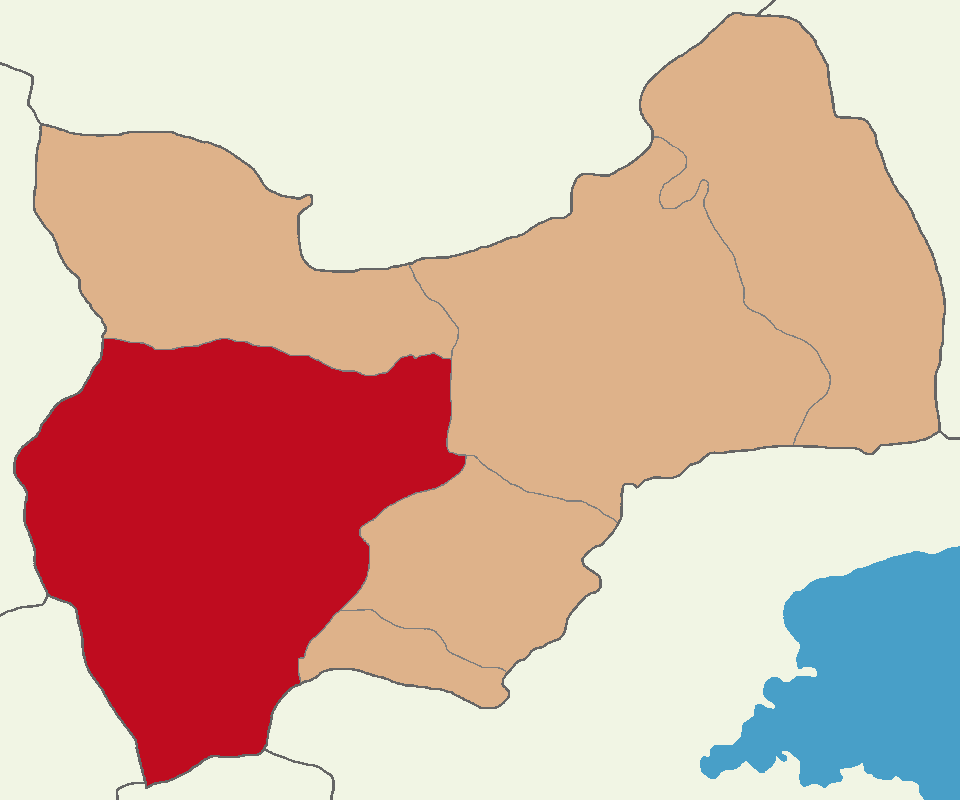
- Map showing Muş District in Muş Province

- Location in Turkey
- Coordinates: 38°44′N 41°29′E
- Country: Turkey
- Province: Muş
- Seat: Muş
- Area: 2,818 km^{2} (1,088 sq mi)
- Population (2022): 200,246
  - Density: 71/km^{2} (180/sq mi)
- Time zone: UTC+3 (TRT)

Muş District (also: Merkez, meaning "central" in Turkish) is a district of the Muş Province of Turkey. Its seat is the city of Muş. Its area is 2,818 km^{2}, and its population is 200,246 (2022).

== Tourism ==
The touristic places in Muş central district are Murat Bridge, the tulips on the Muş Plain, Muş Castle, Kepenek Castle, Haspet Castle and Mercimekkale Mound.

== Composition ==
There are 9 municipalities in Muş District:

- Karaağaçlı
- Kırköy
- Kızılağaç
- Konukbekler
- Muş
- Serinova
- Sungu
- Yaygın
- Yeşilova

There are 98 villages in Muş District:

- Ağaçlık
- Ağartı
- Ağıllı
- Akkonak
- Akpınar
- Alagün
- Alaniçi
- Alican
- Aligedik
- Arıköy
- Arpayazı
- Aşağısızma
- Aşağıyongalı
- Aydoğan
- Bahçeköy
- Balcılar
- Beşparmak
- Bilek
- Bostankent
- Boyuncuk
- Bozbulut
- Çatbaşı
- Cevizlidere
- Çiçekli
- Çöğürlü
- Çukurbağ
- Derecik
- Dereyurt
- Dilimli
- Donatım
- Dumlusu
- Durugöze
- Eğirmeç
- Ekindüzü
- Elçiler
- Eralanı
- Erencik
- Gölköy
- Güdümlü
- Gümüşali
- Gündoğan
- Harman
- Ilıcaköy
- İnardı
- Kalecik
- Karaağaç
- Karabey
- Karaköprü
- Karakuyu
- Karameşe
- Karlıdere
- Kayalısu
- Kayaşık
- Keçidere
- Kepenek
- Kıyıbaşı
- Kıyık
- Köşk
- Kumluca
- Kutlugün
- Mercimekkale
- Mescitli
- Meşecik
- Muratgören
- Nadaslık
- Ortakent
- Oymataş
- Özdilek
- Sağlık
- Sarıdal
- Savaşçılar
- Şenoba
- Soğucak
- Suboyu
- Sudurağı
- Suluca
- Sürügüden
- Suvaran
- Tabanlı
- Tandoğan
- Taşoluk
- Tekyol
- Toprakkale
- Tüten
- Üçdere
- Üçevler
- Üçsırt
- Ulukaya
- Yamaç
- Yarpuzlu
- Yazla
- Yelalan
- Yoncalıöz
- Yörecik
- Yücetepe
- Yukarısızma
- Yukarıyongalı
- Ziyaret
