= Çöğürlü, Muş =

Village in Muş, Turkey

Çöğürlü
- Village
- Location within Turkey
- Coordinates: 38.75088°N 41.52816°E
- Country: Turkey
- Province: Muş
- District: Muş
- Population (2022): 2,328
- Time zone: UTC+3 (TRT)

Çöğürlü (Armenian: Առինջ, romanized: Arinj) is a village of Muş District, Muş Province, eastern Turkey. Its population is 2,328 (2022). It is a satellite village of Muş.

== History ==
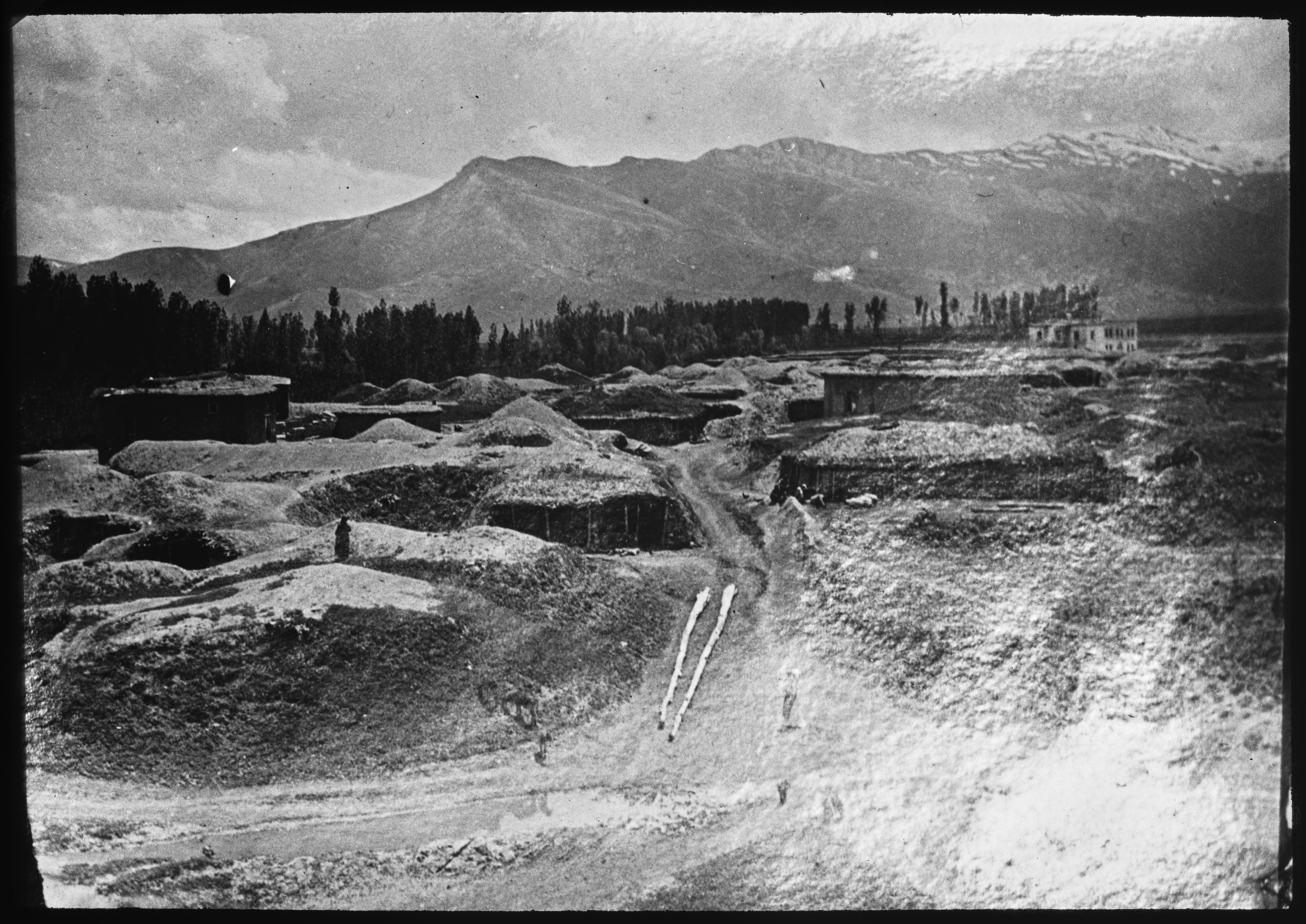
Çöğürlü about 1915

The old name of the village was Arinc or Arinch which was changed to Cogurlu in the 19th century.

At the end of the 19th century Chechens had begun to emigrate from the Caucasus to eastern Turkey. In 1902, it was estimated there were 1300 Armenians living in or around the village. In 1914, the Armenian church estimated only 613 Armenians in or around the village. The village was depopulated in 1914.

Today the economy of a village depends on agriculture and husbandry. There is a primary school in the village which has drinking water and a sewerage network, electricity and fixed telephone. There is a bus service and a railway station.
