= Bingöl Mountains =

Mountain range in Turkey

Niiggg
- Location within Turkey

Highest point
- Elevation: 3.193 m (10.48 ft)
- Prominence: 3.127 m (10.26 ft)
- Coordinates: 39°21′35″N 41°22′56″E

Dimensions
- Length: 55 km (34 mi)
- Width: 35 km (22 mi)

Geography
- Location: Varto, Muş Province, Tekman, Hınıs, Erzurum Province Turkey

Geology
- Mountain type: Shield volcano

Bingöl Mountains (Turkish: Bingöl Dağları; Kurdish: Çiyayên Çewlig) is a mountain range in Turkey at the zero point of the provincial border of Erzurum and Muş.

== Geology and geomorphology ==
Geomap of region

Bingöl Mountains is an example of Shield volcanoes. Dağkale Hill, which is the highest point of the Bingöl Mountains, is located within the borders of Varto district. Its height is 3193 m, length is 50–55 km, width is 30–35 km, area is 1500 km2. The caldera edges of Mount Bingöl and the plateaus 2650–2800 m high have become glacial. There are at least 100 lakes large enough to be mapped on the mountain. The main structure of the mountain consists of andesite and basalts. The slope is soft on the northern slopes of the mountain, whose southern foothills are steep. The waters flowing from the north of the Bingöl Mountains feed the Aras river, and the Murat river from the east and west through the Kocasu stream.
