= Karaağaçlı, Muş =

Karaağaçlı
- Municipality
- Location in Turkey
- Coordinates: 38°41′35″N 41°38′00″E
- Country: Turkey
- Province: Muş
- District: Muş
- Population (2022): 1,924
- Time zone: UTC+3 (TRT)

Karaağaçlı (Armenian: Ալվառինջ/Ալուառինչ/Առուալիճ, romanized: Alvarinj/Alvaŕinç/Aŕvalic) is a town (belde) in the Muş District, Muş Province, Turkey. Its population is 1,924 (2022).
