= Elmakaya =

- Municipality
- Location in Turkey
- Coordinates: 39°01′48″N 42°28′43″E
- Country: Turkey
- Province: Muş
- District: Bulanık
- Population (2022): 2,452
- Time zone: UTC+3 (TRT)

Elmakaya (Armenian: Լաթար, romanized: Latar) is a town (belde) in the Bulanık District, Muş Province, Turkey. Its population is 2,452 (2022).
