= Yoncalı, Bulanık =

Yoncalı
- Municipality
- Location in Turkey
- Coordinates: 39°07′52″N 42°11′13″E
- Country: Turkey
- Province: Muş
- District: Bulanık
- Population (2022): 2,113
- Time zone: UTC+3 (TRT)

Yoncalı (Armenian: Յոնջալու, romanized: Yonjalu) is a town (belde) in the Bulanık District, Muş Province, Turkey. Its population is 2,113 (2022).
