= Otluk Mountains =

Mountain range in Turkey

- Location within Turkey

Highest point
- Elevation: 2.100m
- Coordinates: 38°54′59″N 41°46′02″E

Geography
- Location: Muş, Bulanık, Korkut, Muş Province, Turkey

The Otluk Mountains (Turkish: Otluk Dağları) is a mountain range in eastern Turkey that extends at the zero point of the borders of Muş, Bulanık and Korkut districts. It is located in the middle part of Muş province.

== Geology and geomorphology ==
The range is located within the Karasu creek basin. The highest point of the Otluk mountains is located on a pointed hill exceeding 2100 meters near Üçsırt village of Muş central district.
