= Rüstemgedik =

- Municipality
- Location in Turkey
- Coordinates: 39°09′01″N 42°18′15″E
- Country: Turkey
- Province: Muş
- District: Bulanık
- Population (2022): 2,170
- Time zone: UTC+3 (TRT)

Rüstemgedik is a town (belde) in the Bulanık District, Muş Province, Turkey. Its population is 2,170 (2022).
