= Yeşilova, Muş =

Yeşilova
- Municipality
- Location in Turkey
- Coordinates: 38°55′42″N 41°27′15″E
- Country: Turkey
- Province: Muş
- District: Muş
- Population (2022): 1,944
- Time zone: UTC+3 (TRT)

Yeşilova (Armenian: Ավրան, romanized: Avran) is a town (belde) in the Muş District, Muş Province, Turkey. Its population is 1,944 (2022).
