= Alazlı, Korkut =

Alazlı
- Village
- Location in Turkey
- Coordinates: 38.6922°N 41.8243°E
- Country: Turkey
- Province: Muş
- District: Korkut
- Population (2022): 1,147
- Time zone: UTC+3 (TRT)

Alazlı (Armenian: Դրմերդ, romanized: Drmerd) is a village in the Korkut District, Muş Province, Turkey. Its population is 1.147 (2022).

== History ==
The old name of the village is Tırmert, or Tirmit. Apart from the Kepenek Castle inscription, another inscription proving the existence of the Urartian Kingdom in the geography of Muş is the Alazlı/Tirmet inscription. The inscription in question is located 25.5 km east of Muş province and 6.2 km south of Korkut district. In the inscription, the war fought by the Urartian king Menua is mentioned:

Menua, the son of İşpuini, brought this stone to our Lord Haldi. he sewed. Tann Haldi went on a military expedition with his spear. He captured the city of Trtimi in the territory of the country of Urme.
