= Korkut District =

District of Muş Province, Turkey

- District
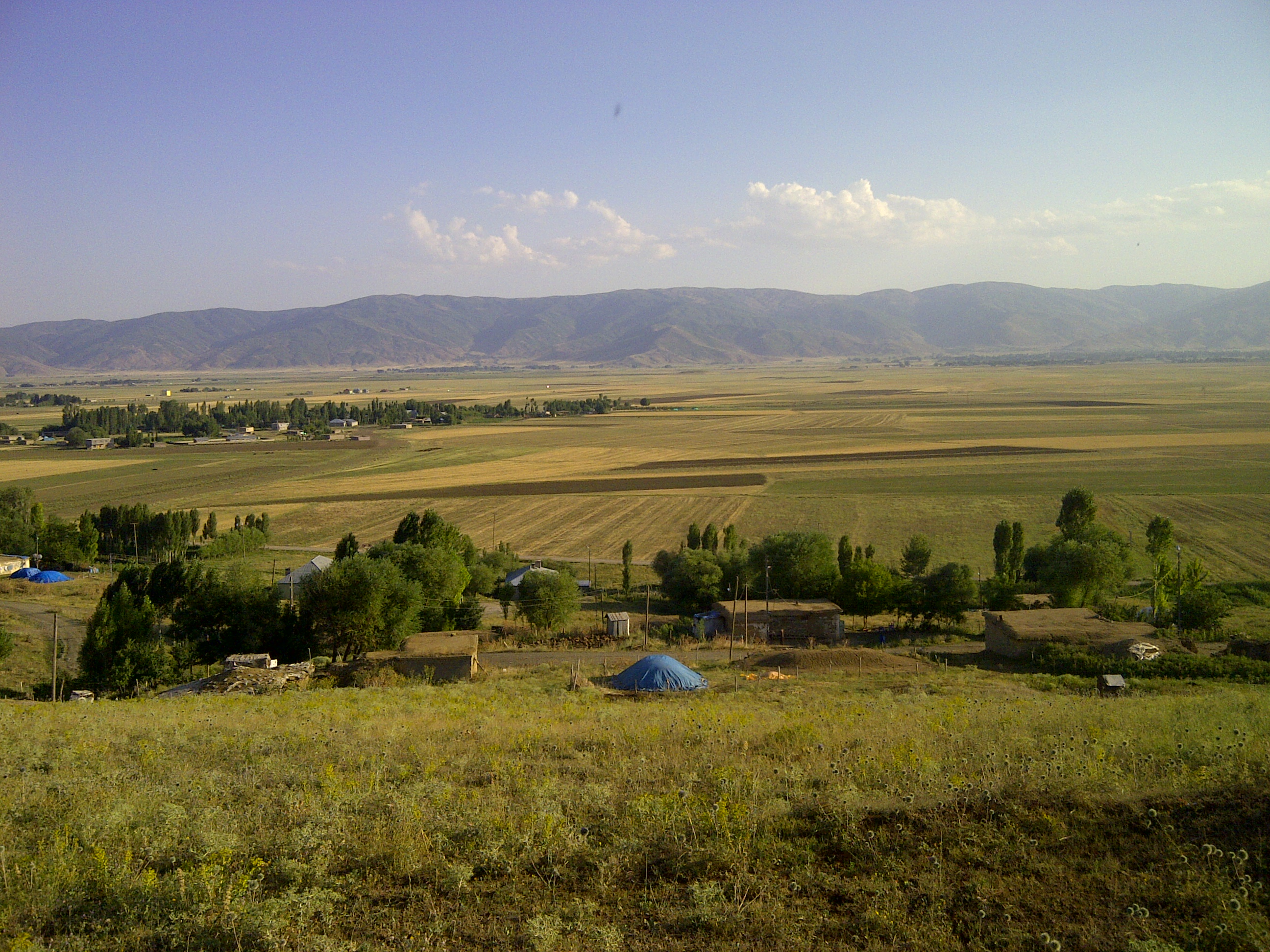
- Korkut countryside

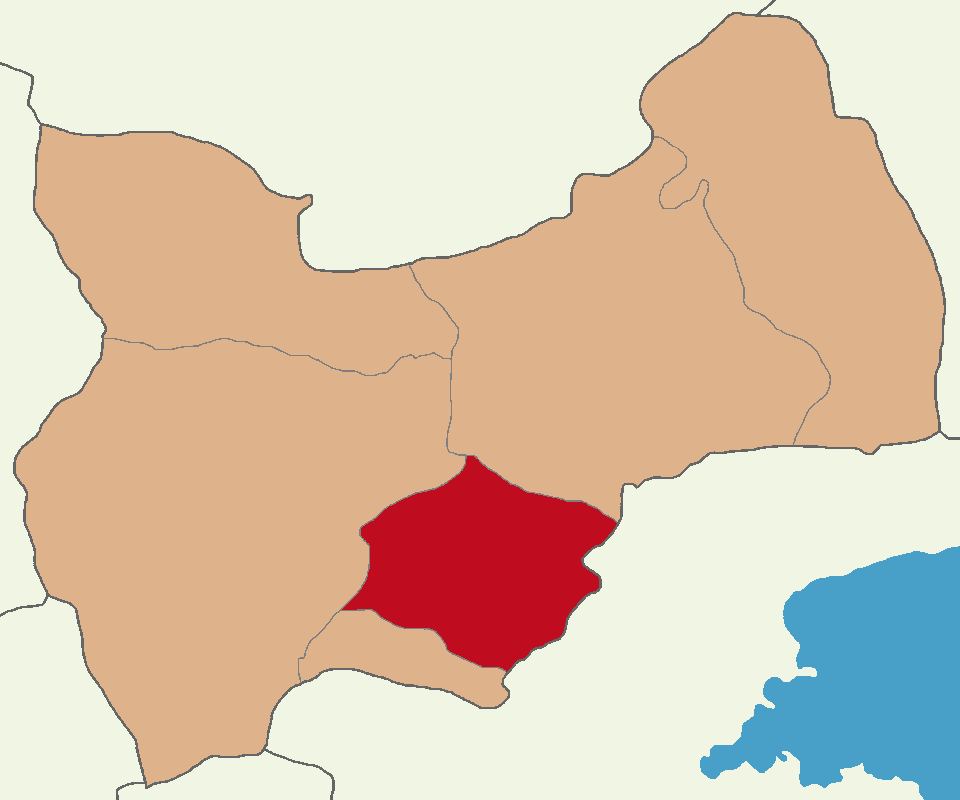
- Map showing Korkut District in Muş Province

- Location within Turkey
- Coordinates: 38°44′N 41°47′E
- Country: Turkey
- Province: Muş
- Seat: Korkut

Government
  - Kaymakam: Ahmed Çelik
- Area: 775 km^{2} (299 sq mi)
- Population (2022): 23,106
  - Density: 29.8/km^{2} (77.2/sq mi)
- Time zone: UTC+3 (TRT)
- Website: www.korkut.gov.tr

Korkut District is a district of the Muş Province of Turkey. Its seat is the town of Korkut. Its area is 775 km^{2}, and its population is 23,106 (2022).

== Composition ==
There are two municipalities in Korkut District:

- Altınova
- Korkut

There are 30 villages in Korkut District:

- Akyıldız
- Alazlı, Korkut
- Balkır
- Çalaplı
- Çınarardı
- Değirmitaş
- Demirci
- Dereiçi
- Durucak
- Düzova
- Gültepe
- Güneyik
- Güven
- İçboğaz
- Kapılı
- Karakale
- Kıryaka
- Kocatarla
- Konakdüzü
- Mollababa
- Oğulbalı
- Pınarüstü
- Sarmaşık
- Sazlıkbaşı
- Tanköy
- Taşlıca
- Yedipınar
- Yolgözler
- Yünören
- Yürekli
