= Konukbekler =

- Municipality
- Location in Turkey
- Coordinates: 38°53′47″N 41°21′46″E
- Country: Turkey
- Province: Muş
- District: Muş
- Population (2022): 3,774
- Time zone: UTC+3 (TRT)

Konukbekler (Armenian: Անծառ, romanized: Andsar) is a town (belde) in the Muş District, Muş Province, Turkey. Its population is 3,774 (2022).
