= Kızılağaç, Muş =

Kızılağaç
- Municipality
- Location in Turkey
- Coordinates: 38°46′51″N 41°19′15″E
- Country: Turkey
- Province: Muş
- District: Muş
- Population (2022): 2,694
- Time zone: UTC+3 (TRT)

Kızılağaç (Armenian: Կզըլաղաջ) is a town (belde) in the Muş District, Muş Province, Turkey. Its population is 2,694 (2022).
