= Yaygın, Muş =

Town in Muş, Turkey

Yaygın
- Municipality
- Location in Turkey
- Coordinates: 38°54′12″N 41°18′33″E
- Country: Turkey
- Province: Muş
- District: Muş
- Population (2022): 4,213
- Time zone: UTC+3 (TRT)

Yaygın (Armenian: Մեղտի, romanized: Meghti) is a town (belde) in the Muş District, Muş Province, Turkey. Its population is 4,213 (2022).

== History ==
The town of Yaygin was in the Middle Ages part of the Taron Region an area heavily fought over in the Byzantine–Sassanid Wars and the Islamic conquest by the Seljuk Turks.

The town then known as Meghdi was primarily Armenian. The Armenian Genocide depopulated the area in 1925.

== Population ==
A survey of the town in 1902 found 135 Armenians in 23 households and a second survey in 1910 found the population was 201 Armenians in 28 households. On the eve of the genocide, the Armenian church stated there were 380 Armenians in 30 households. The parish church was called the St. Masounk church.

The population in 2000 was 4,829 and in 1990 was 3078.
