= Boyalı, Varto =

Village in Muş Province, Turkey

Boyalı
- Village
- Location within Turkey
- Coordinates: 39.11656°N 41.80633°E
- Country: Turkey
- Province: Muş
- District: Varto
- Population (2022): 154
- Time zone: UTC+3 (TRT)

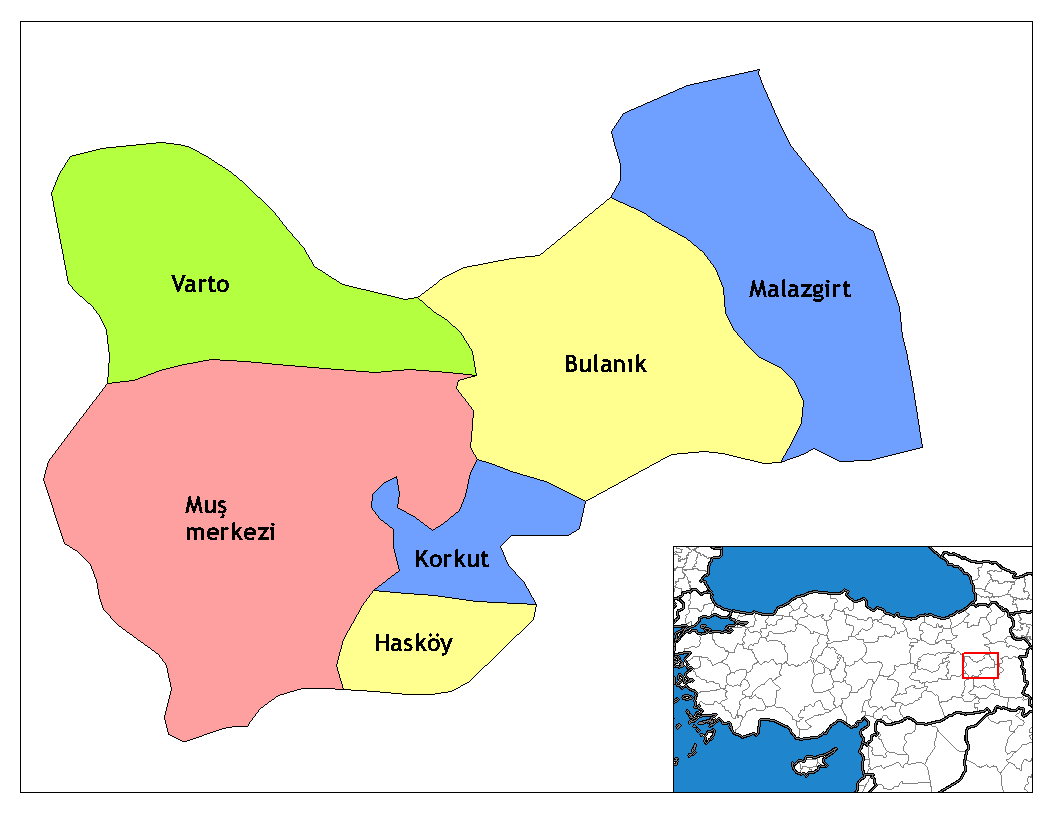
Map of the districts of Muş Province, Turkey.

Boyalı is a village in the Varto District, Muş Province, in east Turkey. Its population is 154 (2022).

== Geology and geography ==
Boyalı and the plateau used for animal husbandry are located on the Akdoğan Mountains.

== Education ==
There is a primary school in the village.
