= Şerafettin Mountains =

Mountain range in Turkey

- Location within Turkey

Highest point
- Elevation: 2.675 m (8.78 ft)
- Coordinates: 39°02′22″N 41°11′57″E

Geography
- Location: Solhan, Karlıova, Bingöl Province, Varto, Muş Province, Turkey

Şerafettin Mountains (Turkish: Şerafettin Dağları) is a mountain range in Turkey at the zero point of the provincial border of Bingöl and Muş.

== Geology and geomorphology ==
The Şerafettin Mountains are found to the west of the Muş provincial area. Most of them are in Bingöl province. The high points of the Şerafettin Mountains, which completely cover the north of Solhan District, are Esen Tepe with a height of 2388 meters and Şahin Tepe with a height of 2675 meters.
