= Serinova, Muş =

Serinova
- Municipality
- Location in Turkey
- Coordinates: 38°55′58″N 41°32′22″E
- Country: Turkey
- Province: Muş
- District: Muş
- Population (2022): 2,177
- Time zone: UTC+3 (TRT)

Serinova (Armenian: Արթերթ, romanized: Artert) is a town (belde) in the Muş District, Muş Province, Turkey. Its population is 2,177 (2022).
