= Sarıpınar, Bulanık =

Sarıpınar
- Municipality
- Location in Turkey
- Coordinates: 39°12′11″N 42°08′31″E
- Country: Turkey
- Province: Muş
- District: Bulanık
- Population (2022): 1,974
- Time zone: UTC+3 (TRT)

Sarıpınar (Armenian: Համզաշեխ, romanized: Hamzashekh) is a town (belde) in the Bulanık District, Muş Province, Turkey. Its population is 1,974 (2022).
