= Derince, Varto =

Village in Muş Province, Turkey

Derince
- Village
- Location within Turkey
- Coordinates: 39.08488°N 41.80236°E
- Country: Turkey
- Province: Muş
- District: Varto
- Population (2022): 124
- Time zone: UTC+3 (TRT)

Derince is a village in the Varto District, Muş Province, in east Turkey. Its population is 124 (2022).

== Geology and geography ==
Derince and the plateau used for animal husbandry are located on the Akdoğan Mountains.
