= Varto =

Town in Muş Province, Turkey

- Municipality
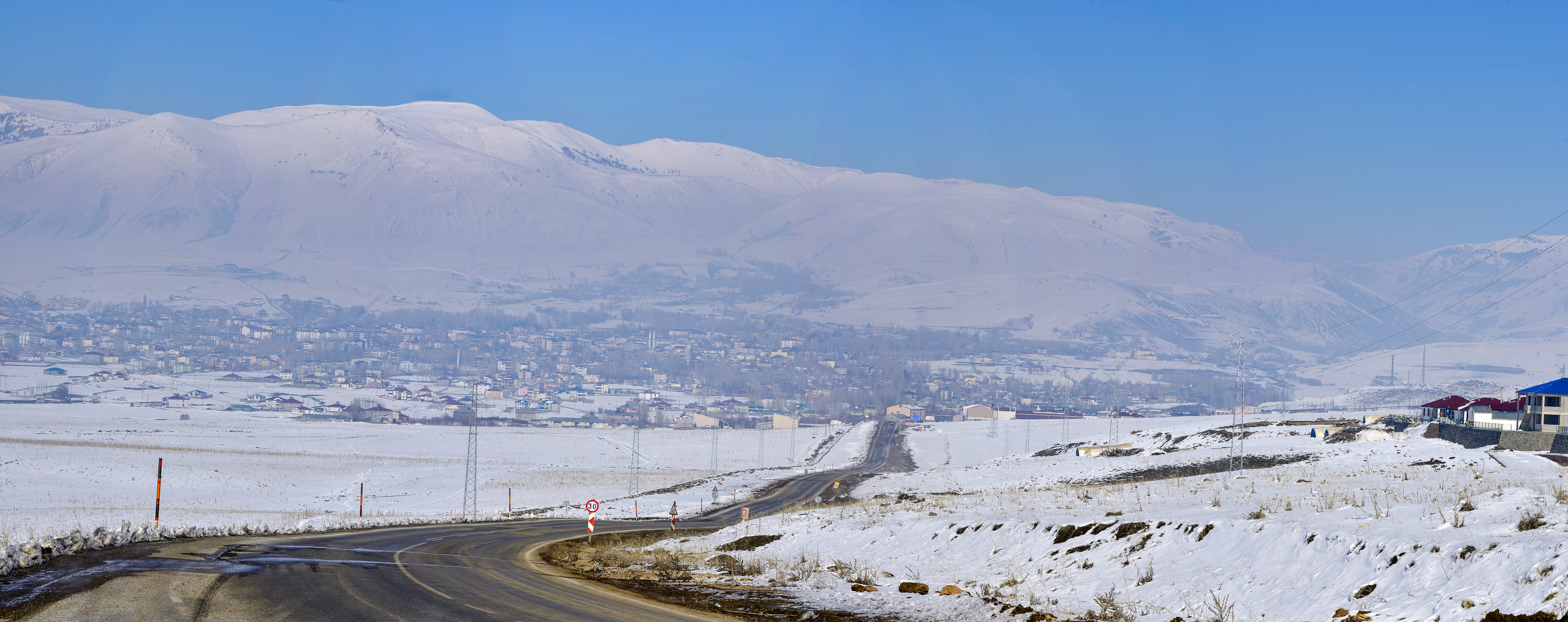
- View of Varto and Bingöl Mountains

- Location within Turkey
- Coordinates: 39°10′23″N 41°27′21″E
- Country: Turkey
- Province: Muş
- District: Varto

Government
  - Mayor: Giyasettin Aydemir (DEM)
- Elevation: 1,500 m (4,900 ft)
- Population (2024): 29,174
- Time zone: UTC+3 (TRT)
- Postal code: 49600
- Area code: 0436
- Website: www.varto.bel.tr

Varto (Kurdish: Gimgim; Armenian: Վարդօ or Վարդո, Varto) is a town in Muş Province, Turkey. It is the seat of Varto District. Varto was elected from the DEM Party in the 2024 Turkish Local Elections, with Giyasettin Aydemir serving as the mayor. According to the 2024 population census, the district's total population is 29,174.

== History ==
Some 5,200 Armenians were living in the district of Varto in 1914, including 600 in the town of Varto. Eight churches, 3 monasteries and 5 schools tended to their to spiritual needs. In June 1915 during the Armenian genocide, a great number of Varto's Armenians were massacred in the valley of Newala Ask.

It was the epicenter of the 1966 earthquake that killed nearly 3,000 people.

There are about a hundred villages in the Varto district.

== Geology and geomorphology ==
Varto District is surrounded by Bingöl Mountains from the north and Şerafettin Mountains from the south. Akdoğan Lakes are located in the east of the district center. The altitude exceeds 3000 meters in the Bingöl mountains in the north of the district center and 2300 meters in the Akdoğan and Şerafettin mountains.

== Tourism ==
The touristic places in Varto are Lake Akdoğan, Künav Cave, Bingöl Mountains, Kayalıdere Castle.

== Demographics ==
Before the Ottoman rule, region was almost exclusively Armenian. It then became ethnically and religiously diverse. In 1891, Vital Cuinet reported a population of 16,994: 9,000 Muslims and 7,994 Armenians. Muslims were mostly Kurds and Circassian muhacir. The Armenian Patriarchate of Constantinople counted, on the eve of the First World War, 4,649 Armenians in the whole kaza, with seven churches, three monasteries, and four schools.

According to the 1927 Turkish census, all 9,822 inhabitants of the Varto District were Muslims.

Mother tongue, Muş District, 1927 Turkish census
Turkish	Arabic	Kurdish	Circassian	Other
731	1	8,774	2	314

== Politics ==
Musa Ayyıldız started to work as the Deputy Mayor on March 9, 2023 after the Presidential Decree.
