= Varto District =

District of Muş Province, Turkey

- District
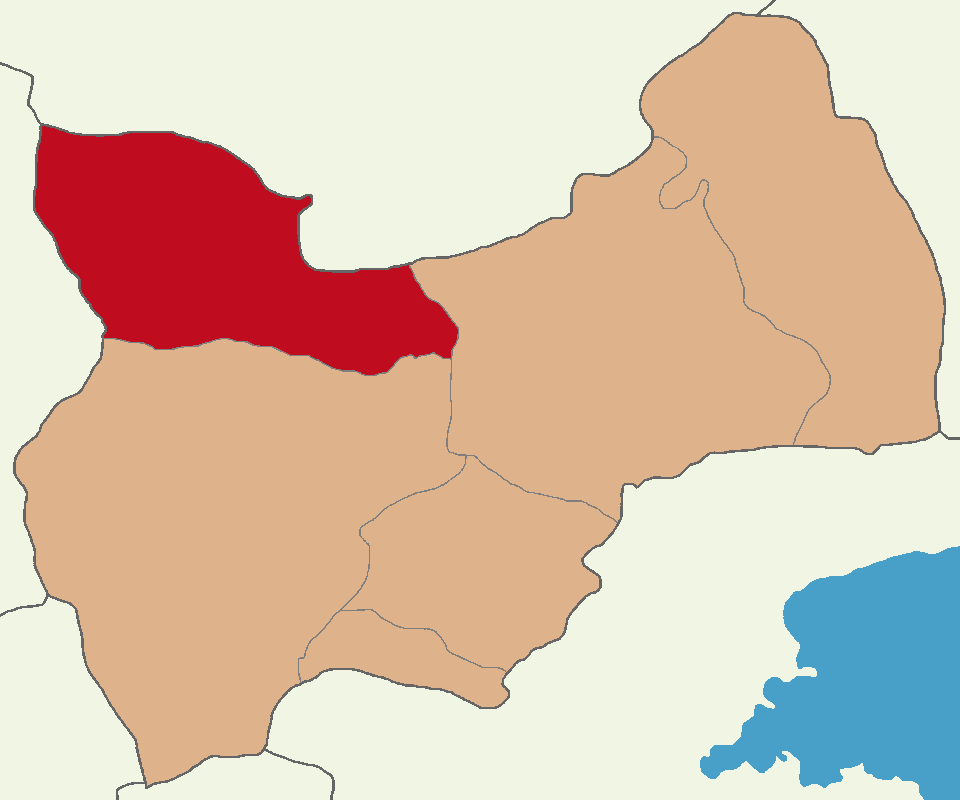
- Map showing Varto District in Muş Province

- Location in Turkey
- Coordinates: 39°10′N 41°27′E
- Country: Turkey
- Province: Muş
- Seat: Varto

Government
  - Kaymakam: Musa AYYILDIZ
- Area: 1,318 km^{2} (509 sq mi)
- Population (2022): 30,267
  - Density: 23/km^{2} (59/sq mi)
- Time zone: UTC+3 (TRT)
- Website: www.varto.gov.tr

Varto District (Armenian: Վարդոյի գաւառակ) is a district of the Muş Province of Turkey. Its seat is the town of Varto. Its area is 1,318 km^{2}, and its population is 30,267 (2022).

== Geology and geomorphology ==
Varto District is surrounded by Bingöl Mountains from the north and Şerafettin Mountains from the south. Akdoğan Lakes are located in the east of the district center. The altitude exceeds 3000 meters in the Bingöl mountains in the north of the district center and 2300 meters in the Akdoğan and Şerafettin Mountains.

== Education ==
Hamurpet Secondary School is one of the schools in the district.

== Composition ==
There is one municipality in Varto District:

- Varto

There are 93 villages in Varto District:

- Acarkent
- Ağaçaltı
- Ağaçkorur
- Akçatepe
- Alabalık
- Alnıaçık
- Armutkaşı
- Aşağıalagöz
- Aşağıhacıbey
- Bağiçi
- Baltaş
- Başkent
- Beşikkaya
- Boyalı
- Boylu
- Buzlugöze
- Çalıdere
- Çaltılı
- Çayçatı
- Çayıryolu
- Çaylar
- Çayönü
- Çobandağı
- Dağcılar
- Dallıöz
- Değerli
- Derince
- Diktepeler
- Doğanca
- Dönertaş
- Durucabulak
- Dutözü
- Erdoğan
- Eryurdu
- Esenler
- Gelintaşı
- Göltepe
- Gölyayla
- Görgü
- Güzeldere
- Güzelkent
- Haksever
- Hüseyinoğlu
- İçmeler
- İlbey
- Kalecik
- Karaköy
- Karameşe
- Karapınar
- Kartaldere
- Kayadelen
- Kayalıdere
- Kayalık
- Kayalıkale
- Kaygıntaş
- Kaynarca
- Koçyatağı
- Kolan
- Köprücük
- Küçüktepe
- Kumlukıyı
- Kuşluk
- Leylek
- Ocaklı
- Oğlakçı
- Ölçekli
- Omcalı
- Onpınar
- Özenç
- Özkonak
- Sağlıcak
- Sanlıca
- Sazlıca
- Seki
- Taşçı
- Taşdibek
- Taşlıyayla
- Teknedüzü
- Tepeköy
- Tuzlu
- Üçbulak
- Ulusırt
- Ünaldı
- Yarlısu
- Yayıklı
- Yayla
- Yedikavak
- Yeşildal
- Yeşilpınar
- Yılanlı
- Yukarıhacıbey
- Yurttutan
- Zorabat
