= Bulanık =

- Municipality
- Location in Turkey
- Coordinates: 39°5′42″N 42°16′0″E
- Country: Turkey
- Province: Muş
- District: Bulanık

Government
  - Mayor: Aryan Doğan
- Elevation: 1,480 m (4,860 ft)
- Population (2024): 70,568
- Time zone: UTC+3 (TRT)
- Postal code: 49500
- Area code: 0436
- Website: www.bulanik.bel.tr

Bulanık, formerly Gop or Kop (Armenian: Կոփ; Kurdish: Kop), is a town in Muş Province, in the Eastern Anatolian region of Turkey. It is the seat of Bulanık District. Bulanık was elected from the DEM Party in the 2024 Turkish Local Elections, with Aryan Doğan serving as the mayor. According to the 2024 population census, the district's total population is 70,568.

== History ==
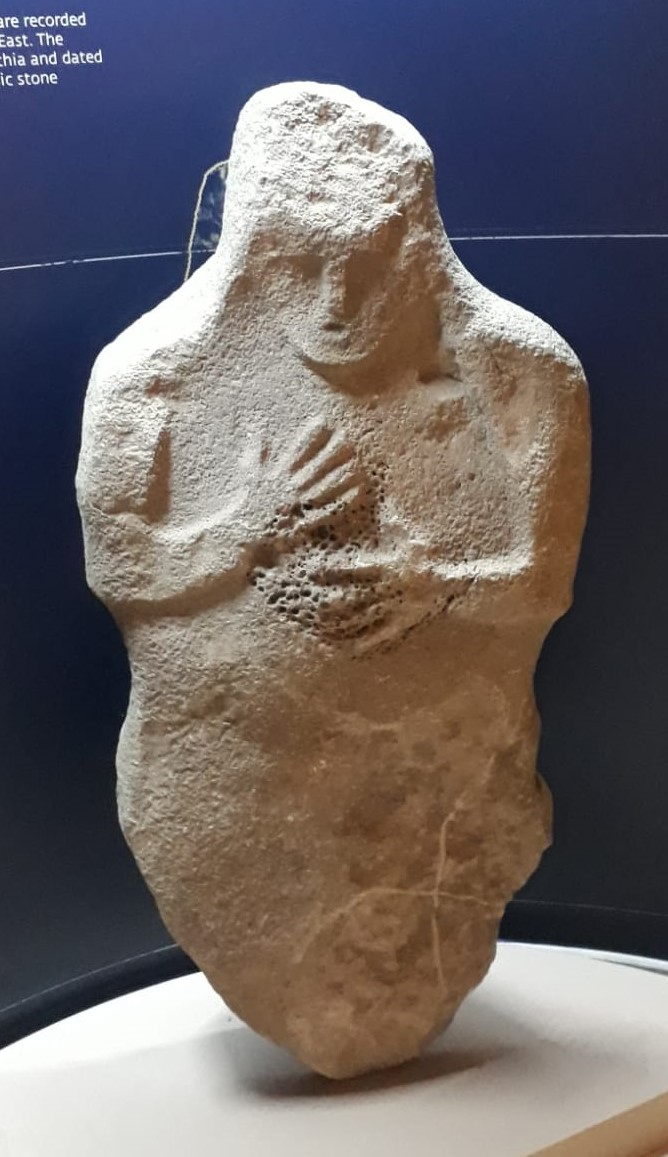
A Urartian Bulanık Stele, Bitlis Ahlat Museum

In the 19th century Bulanık was the name of the kaza. Its capital, today's Bulanık town, was called Gop, also rendered as Kop. At the end of the 19th century Gop was described as a large village with about 400 houses, all but 50 of them inhabited by Armenians. Although the soil was amongst the most fertile in the region, the inhabitants were almost destitute due to the region's insecurity and the impossibility of exporting their crops. Two miles south of the village was an Armenian monastery named Surb Daniel which contained the relics of a saint of that name.

The district was formerly called Hark' and was part of Historical Armenia's Turuberan province. The earliest record of Kop is found in the 995 encyclical from Vandir monastery under the name Koghb, which was later distorted.

Bulanık means "blurred" in Turkish which is a cite for Murat River.

After the Battle of Manzikert in 1071, Turkmen tribes (such as Bayat, Eymür and Bayındır) settled in Bulanık. Today, Kurds are the majority. Before the Armenian genocide, there was an Armenian majority, which was later replaced by Turks (in addition to local Turkmens). Bulanık took a lot of Turkic emigrants such as Meskhetians and Qarapapaq Turks. These Muhacirs first came with the Russo-Turkish War and continued to come during the Republic era). An American consul, Consul Tyrell, visited the border region between Bulanık and Eleşkirt and made these observations in the beginning of the 20th century:

There are only three or four Armenian villages in this [Bulanik] kaza [county], most of the settled inhabitants being Muhajirs of Turcoman origin. They are called Karapapak [Black hat wearers], part of them being from the Caucasus and part from Azerbaijan, and their settlements extend in[to] the Alashgird plain. Some of them are Shujas. They are better agriculturists than the Circassians and Kurds, and good gardeners as well. In Alashgird, there are several large and thriving villages and many Armenians, but the number of these last was reduced during the massacres, and they say that the plain has not yet attained the pitch of prosperity which it enjoyed before those events.

The town's current mayor is Oğuzhan Ocak.

== Tourism ==
The touristic places in Bulanık are Lake Haçlı, Bilican Mountains and Esenlik Mosque.

== Economy ==
Historically, Bulanık was known for producing wheat and salt.

== Demographics ==
The demographics of the region fluctuated a lot across history. Turkmen tribes settled in the area after the 1071 Battle of Manzikert. Before the Armenian genocide, Armenians formed the majority of the population. The Armenian Patriarchate of Constantinople, on the eve of the First World War, reports 25,053 Armenians in the kaza of Bulanık, with 29 churches, three monasteries and 14 schools.

According to the 1927 Turkish census, all 5,297 inhabitants of the Bulanık District were Muslims.

Mother tongue, Muş District, 1927 Turkish census
Turkish	Arabic	Kurdish	Circassian	Other
29	–	4,932	336	13

Today, Kurds are the majority.
