= Mount Göztepe =

Mountain in Turkey

- Map of the mountain

Highest point
- Elevation: 2.594 m (8.51 ft)
- Coordinates: 39°06′46″N 41°50′47″E

Geography
- Location within Turkey
- Location: Varto, Bulanık, Muş Province, Turkey
- Parent range: Akdoğan Mountains

Mount Göztepe (Kurdish: Çiyayê Kolîbaba Turkish: Göztepe Dağı or Kolibaba Dağı), is a mountain 2594 meters high that naturally determines the border of Varto and Bulanık districts of Muş.

== Geology and geomorphology ==
Geomap of region

Mount Göztepe is located south of the Akdoğan Mountain range and north of the Bilican Mountains. Göztepe Mountain is connected to the foot of the Akdoğan Mountains after a large depression extending from southwest to northeast. It is one of the highest mountains of Muş province. There are more than 20 villages at the foot of the mountain. Due to the similarity of the typical Armenian plateaus, it is very similar in terms of height, valley and shape to Mount Ara in Armenia.

=== Flora ===
The main plant species on Mount Göztepe are toxic ferula and non-toxic ferula, Rheum ribes, Gundelia, sorrel, Arum maculatum, Asphodelus, Paeonia turcica, Diplotaenia cachrydifolia, Astragalus kurdicus and Chaerophyllum macrospermum. In addition, there are Pleurotus eryngii var. ferulae mushrooms in the high parts of the mountain.
