= Uyanık =

Uyanık is a Turkish surname. Notable people with the surname include:

- Deniz Uyanık (born 2001), Turkish female volleyball player
- Ertan Uyanık (born 1979), Turkish futsal player
- Özgür Uyanık, Turkish writer and film director

== See also ==
- Uyanık, Bismil
- Uyanık, Hınıs
- Uyanık, Sarayköy
