= Karamalahi =

Karamalahi or Karam Alahi (Persian: كرم الهي) may refer to:

- Karamalahi, Delfan
- Karam Alahi, Selseleh
- Karamolla, Hınıs
