= Molladavut, Karaçoban =

Village in Turkey

Molladavut
- Neighbourhood
- Location in Turkey
- Coordinates: 39°15′01″N 41°55′47″E
- Country: Turkey
- Province: Erzurum
- District: Karaçoban
- Population (2022): 578
- Time zone: UTC+3 (TRT)

Molladavut is a neighbourhood in the municipality and district of Karaçoban, Erzurum Province in Turkey. Its population is 578 (2022).

== Geography ==
Molladavut village is located on the Akdoğan Mountains and is very close to Lake Akdoğan.
