= Şahverdi =

Şahverdi can refer to:

- Şahverdi Çetin
- Şahverdi, Hınıs
- Şahverdi, Refahiye
