= Lake Akdoğan =

Freshwater crater lake in Muş Province, eastern Turkey

- Hamurpert Lake
- Akdoğan Gölü (Turkish)
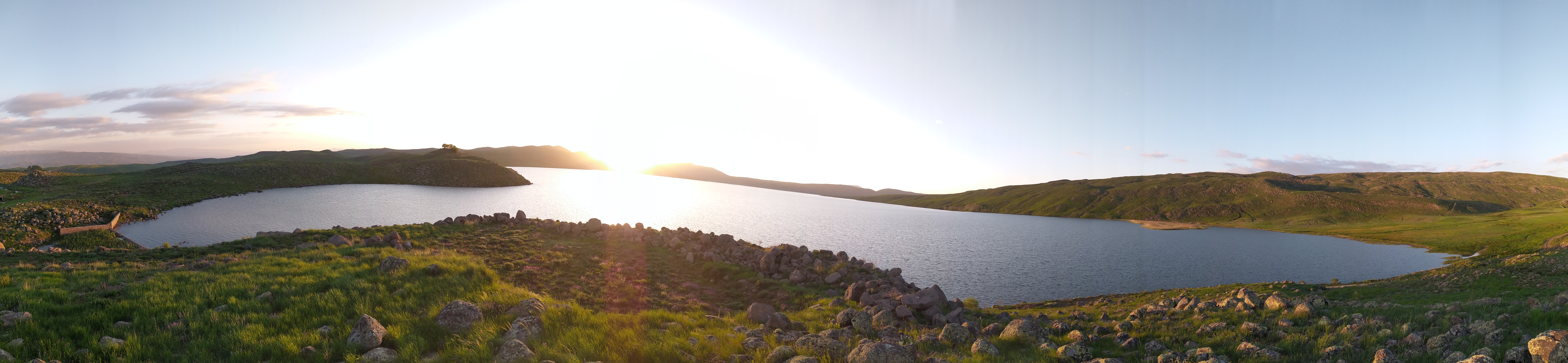
- Panoramic view of Akdoğan

- Location of Lake Akdoğan in Turkey.
- Location: Varto, Muş Province, Turkey
- Coordinates: 39°8′22″N 41°44′29″E
- Lake type: Tectonic lake, Crater
- Primary outflows: İskender creek(near Ünaldı village)
- Basin countries: Turkey
- Surface area: 11.00 km^{2} (4.25 sq mi)
- Average depth: 21 m (69 ft)
- Max. depth: 47 m (154 ft)
- Surface elevation: 2,149 m (7,051 ft)

Lake Akdoğan (Kurdish: Gola/Behra Xamirpêtê, Turkish: Akdoğan Gölü), also called Lake Hamurpert (Armenian: Համուրպետ լիճ, romanized: Hamurpet lič̣), is the name of two neighbouring Crater lakes on the Akdoğan Mountains in Turkey. They are separated by a land strip of about 210 metres (690 ft). They are both high-altitude lakes located in Varto district of Muş Province.

== History ==
The word xamurpert means "dried castle" in Armenian. According to Gukas Inchichyan, it is said that a bey (melik) dynasty of Sasun origin ruled in the Xamurpert castle in these mountains until the 1760s.

== Geology and geomorphology ==
Geomap of region

As a result of the volcanic eruptions in the Akdoğan Mountains. Akdoğan crater lakes were formed. The complete melting of the snow around the lakes takes place at the end of May. With the arrival of May, the habitats around the lakes have been revived.

=== Bigger lake ===
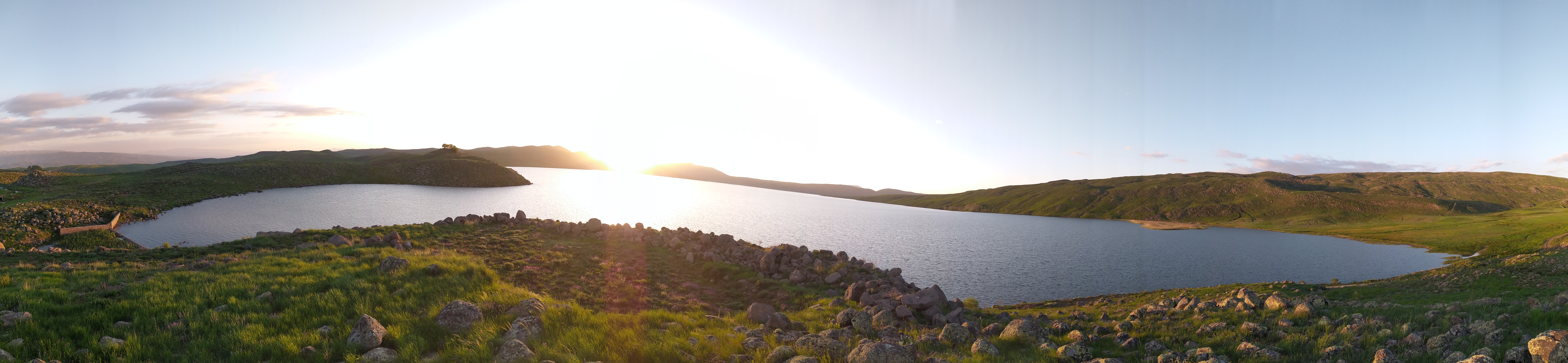
Bigger Lake Akdoğan

Lake Akdoğan (Turkish: Akdoğan Gölü) is at 39°8′22″N 41°44′29″E. Its elevation with respect to sea level is 2,149 metres (7,051 ft) and its maximum depth is 21 metres (69 ft). Its surface area is about 11 square kilometres (4.2 sq mi) The snow from Akdoğan mountains feeds it, and the excess water pours into İskender creek. Big Akdoğan is 3,971 meters wide and 6,185 meters long.

=== Smaller lake ===
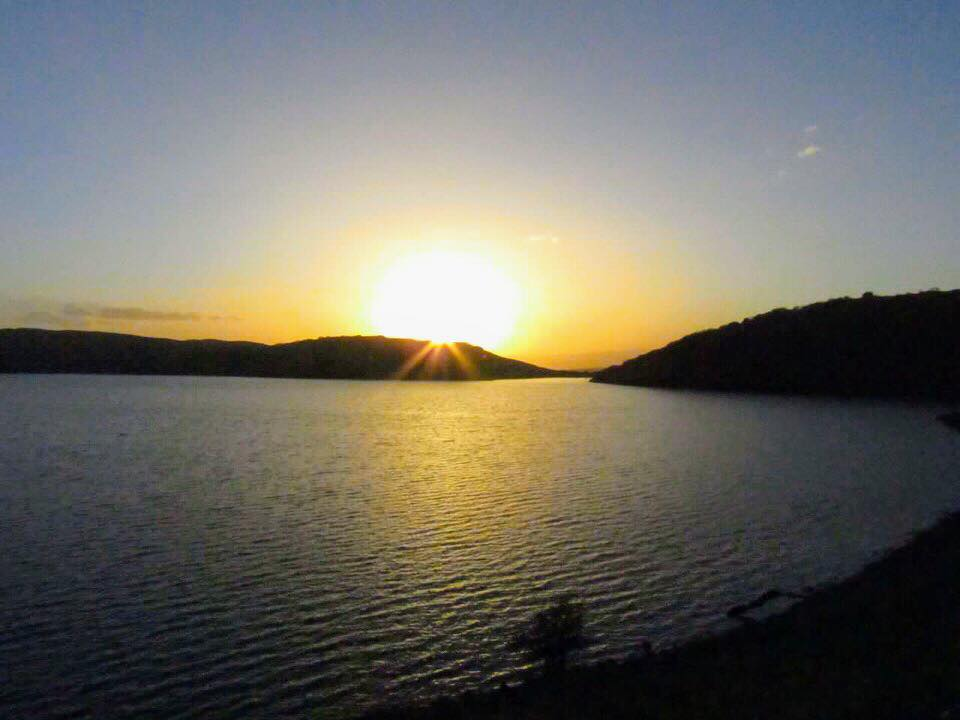
Lake Small Akdoğan

Lake Lesser Akdoğan (Turkish: Küçük Akdoğan Gölü) is at 39°6′35″N 41°45′20″E. Its elevation with respect to sea level is 2,173 metres (7,129 ft) and its maximum depth is 47 metres (154 ft). Its surface area is 1.54 square kilometres (0.59 sq mi). It feeds the main lake through an underground creek. Small Akdoğan is 2,243 meters long and 964 meters wide.

== Biota ==
=== Flora ===
Flora of the Akdoğan Lakes. Qûçan region has completely brown soil. Other places are semi-brown and consist of different types of soil.

The main plant species in the Akdoğan Lakes are toxic Ferula and non-toxic Ferula, Rheum ribes, Gundelia, Sorrel, Arum maculatum, Eremurus spectabilis, Diplotaenia cachrydifolia Boiss, Chaerophyllum macrospermum, Thymus (plant), Paeonia turcica, Astragalus kurdicus and Euphorbia sp. In addition, there are Pleurotus eryngii var. ferulae mushrooms in every part of the Lakes. Frangula alnus and Prunus cerasifera are located on the humid shores of the lake. Oak tree, Crataegus monogyna, Malus sylvestris, Prunus mahaleb, Rosa canina and Cotoneaster nummularius are other trees around the lake.

=== Fauna ===
The main fish in the lake is the common carp. The primary birds living on the lake are ducks, geese, and cranes. There are also many Bears around the lake. Other animals in the region are Wolf, Fox, Pig, Partridge, Lynx, Turtle, Williams's jerboa, Caspian turtle and European green lizard.

== See also ==
- Lake Nemrut
