= Ferula (disambiguation) =

Ferula is a genus of flowering plants.

Ferula may also refer to:

- Papal ferula, the pastoral staff used in the Catholic Church by the Pope
- Ferula mushroom, a mushroom that often grows in the dried roots of the poisonous Ferula plant
- Férula, a character in The House of the Spirits by Isabel Allende
- Ferula, leather-covered whale bone, used at St Ignatius' College for corporal punishment
