= Erduran =

Erduran is a Turkish surname. Notable people with the surname include:

- Ayla Erduran (1934–2025), Turkish violinist
- Erol Erduran (1932–2011), Turkish Cypriot educator and writer
- Refik Erduran (1928–2017), Turkish playwright, columnist and writer

== See also ==
- Erduran, Hınıs
