= Taşbulak =

Taşbulak can refer to:

- Taşbulak, Hınıs
- Taşbulak, Kemah
