= Kazancı =

Kazancı is a Turkish place name and may refer to:

- Kazancı, Bismil
- Kazancı, Hınıs
- Kazancı, Ilgaz
- Kazancı, Karaman

== See also ==
- Kazanci (disambiguation)
