= Akdoğan Mountains =

Mountain range in Turkey

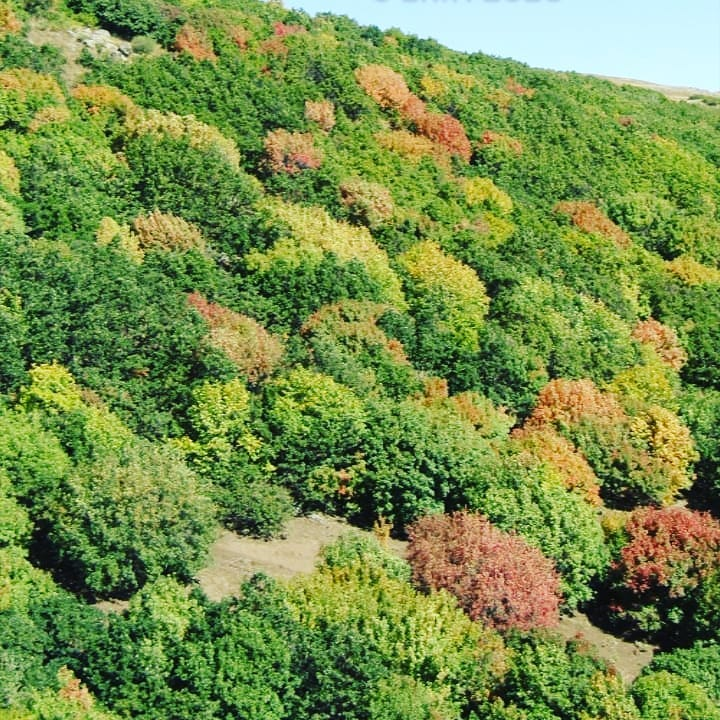
- View of forests

Highest point
- Elevation: 2.879 m (9.45 ft)
- Prominence: 2.594 m (8.51 ft)
- Coordinates: 39°11′05″N 41°51′42″E

Dimensions
- Length: 30 km (19 mi)
- Width: 10 km (6.2 mi)

Geography
- Location within Turkey
- Location: Muş Province, Erzurum Province, Turkey

Geology
- Mountain type: Volcanic

Akdoğan Mountains (Kurdish: Çiyayên Xamirpêtê, Turkish: Akdoğan Dağları or Hamurpert Dağları); (Armenian: Համուր, Khamur or Xamurpert); is a mountain range located at the zero point of the Muş and Erzurum border. It extends from the east of Akdoğan lake to Karaçoban district by crossing the border where Varto, Bulanık and Hınıs districts intersect.

== Geology and geomorphology ==
Geomap of region

Akdoğan mountains appear as a mountain mass between the Hınıs Plain and the Murat river. It includes Akdoğan Lake, one of Turkey's highest and well-preserved lakes. It has rich water resources and some parts of the mountain consist of calcareous layers. Akdoğan Mountains are one of the important wetlands for birds and there are more than 100 small and shallow lakes on it. Most of the lakes are located around the Hınıs villages, located north of the 2879 meter peak. Akdoğan Mountains are one of the highest mountains in Muş province and have the most organized forests. The width of the Akdoğan mountains is 10 km and the length is 30 km. As a result of the volcanic eruptions in the Akdoğan Mountains, Akdoğan crater lakes was formed. Göztepe and Hızırbaba are one of the highest mountains on the Akdoğan mountains. Mount Süphan is visible even in the lowest parts of the region.

== Biota ==
=== Flora ===
Flora of the south of the Akdoğan mountains. Qûçan region is completely brown soil. Other places are semi-brown and consist of different types of soil.

The main plant species in the Akdoğan mountains are toxic Ferula and non-toxic Ferula, Rheum ribes, Gundelia, Sorrel, Arum maculatum, Eremurus spectabilis, Diplotaenia cachrydifolia Boiss, Chaerophyllum macrospermum, Thymus (plant), Eryngium billardieri, Chondrilla juncea, Paeonia turcica, Astragalus kurdicus, Chicory and Euphorbia sp. In addition, there are Pleurotus eryngii var. ferulae mushrooms in every part of the mountain. Frangula alnus and Prunus cerasifera are located on the humid shores of the lakes. Oak trees, Crataegus monogyna, Malus sylvestris, Pyrus elaeagrifolia, Prunus mahaleb, Rosa canina, Aria edulis and Cotoneaster nummularius are other trees on the mountains.

=== Fauna ===
The main animals in the region are Bear, Wolf, Fox, Pig, Partridge, Lynx, Duck, Turtle, Williams's jerboa, Caspian turtle and European green lizard.
