= Dikili (disambiguation) =

Dikili can refer to:

- Dikili
- Dikili, Hınıs
- Dikili, Horasan
