= Lake Ahır =

Lake in Turkey

- Location within Turkey
- Location: Binpınar, Karaçoban, Erzurum, Turkey
- Coordinates: 39.396461°N 42.023502°E
- Lake type: Freshwater, Travertine
- Basin countries: Turkey
- Surface area: 9 km^{2} (3.5 sq mi)
- Surface elevation: 1.750 m (5 ft 8.9 in)

Lake Ahır (Turkish: Ahır Gölü) is a travertine lake in the northwest of Karaçoban district of Turkey’s Erzurum province. The travertines around the lake are used in the construction of houses in Karaçoban and his villages.
