= Hınıs =

District in Turkey

- District and municipality
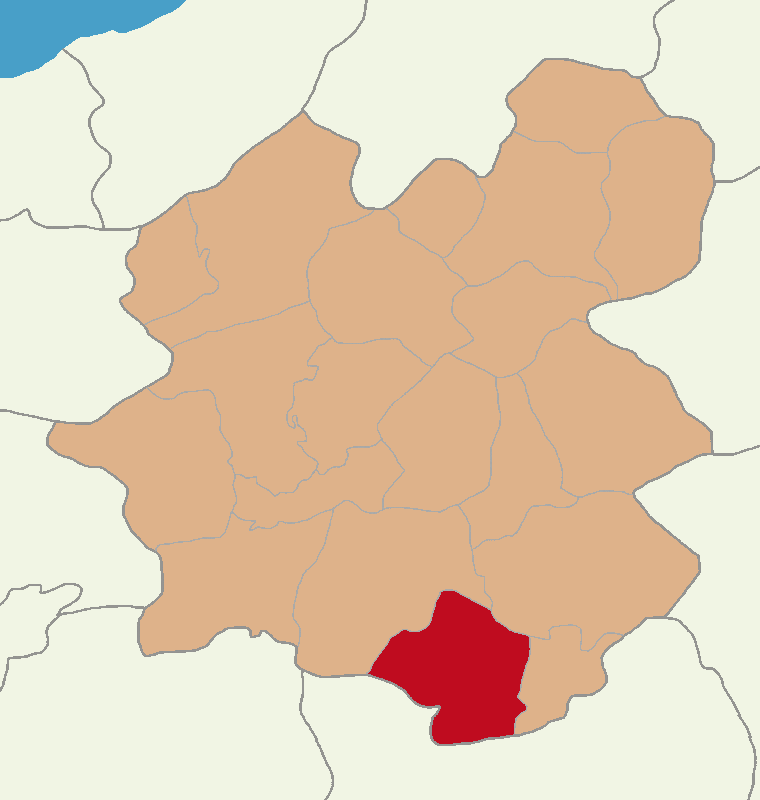
- Map showing Hınıs District in Erzurum Province

- Location in Turkey
- Coordinates: 39°21′31″N 41°42′1″E
- Country: Turkey
- Province: Erzurum

Government
  - Mayor: Serdal Şan (AKP)
- Area: 1,367 km^{2} (528 sq mi)
- Population (2022): 24,680
  - Density: 18.05/km^{2} (46.76/sq mi)
- Time zone: UTC+3 (TRT)
- Postal code: 25600
- Area code: 0442

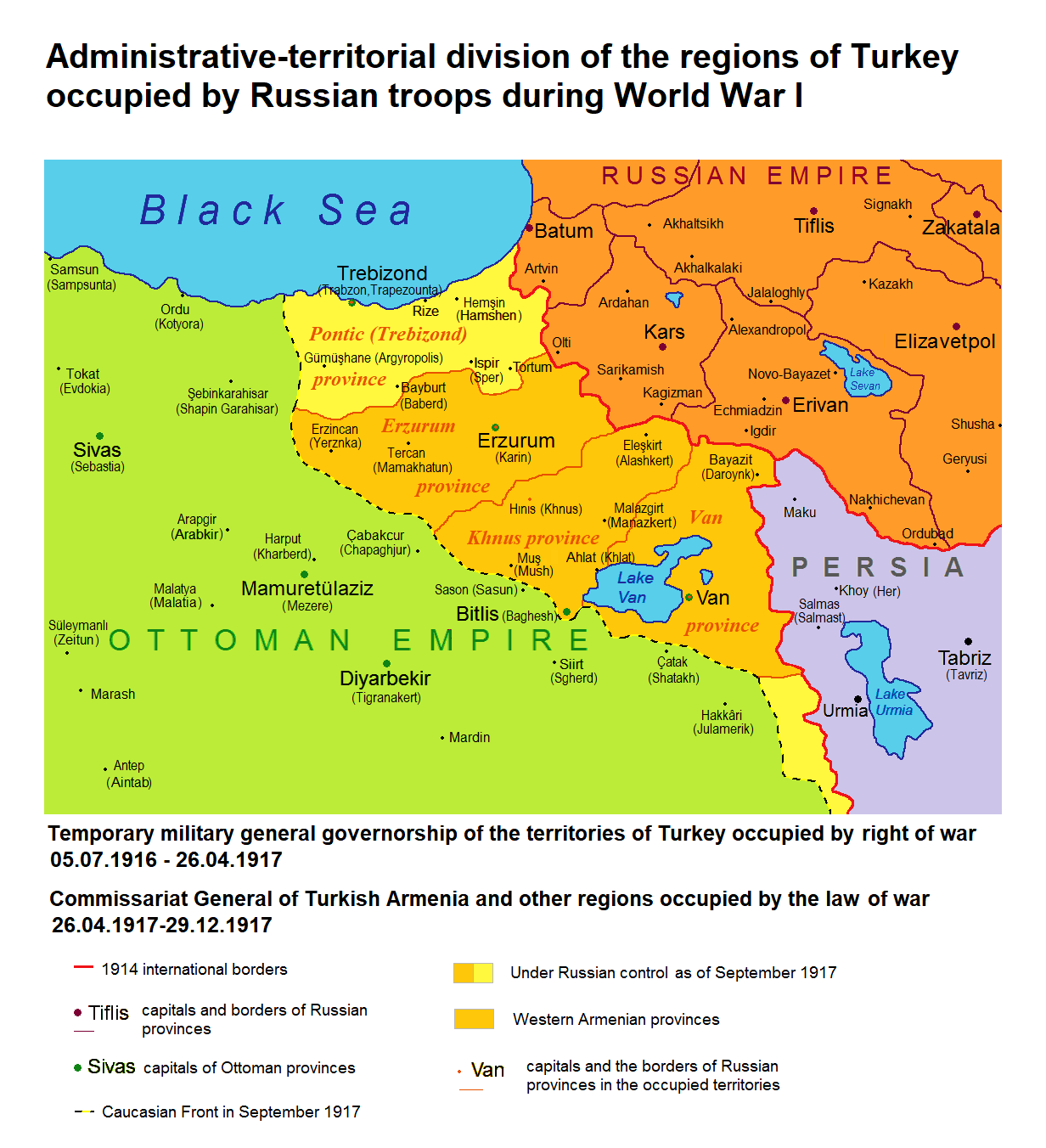
Khnus region in the administrative-territorial division of the regions of Turkey occupied by Russian troops during World War I 1916-1917

Hınıs (Kurdish: Xinûs; Armenian: Խնուս, romanized: Khnus) is a municipality and district of Erzurum Province, Turkey. Its area is 1,367 km^{2}, and its population is 24,680 (2022). Historical monuments in the town include the castle and the Ulu Cami Mosque, said to be built in 1734 by Alaeddin, the bey of Muş. The town is populated by Kurds.

The district, which is 150 km away from the city of Muş, is very close to Hamurpert Lake, which has an important place in history. Hınıs district is surrounded by the Ak Dağ mountains from the north, Bingöl Mountains from the west and south, and Akdoğan mountains from the south to the east. Hınıs district is neighbors with Tekman and Karayazı districts to the north, Karaçoban district to the east, and Varto, Bulanık and Malazgirt districts of Muş to the south. In addition, the Varto city is only 40 km from Hınıs. Hınıs is a plain district and Hınıs Plain is one of the most fertile plains of the region. Therefore, agriculture and animal husbandry are the main sources of income in the district. It has the same characteristics as Erzurum in terms of climate and nature. Winters are cold and snowy, and summers are generally cool. In general, it can be said that it is 5-6 degrees warmer than Erzurum.

== Geography ==
Geomap of Hınıs

The Hınıs Plain is an upland plain centered on a tributary of the Murat River. A range of hills on the south separates the Hınıs plain from the Murat River. Kocasu Creek is the biggest water source of Hınıs. It passes through the district center and pours into the Murat river in Bulanık district. On the southwest, the Hınıs plain is separated from the Varto plain by a series of hills and steep valleys. To the north is a range of pyramid-shaped hills called the Ak Dağ, or White Mountains, which are in turn connected to the Bingöl Mountains further west by a plateau called the Menge Dağ. The Menge Dağ forms the northwestern border of the Hınıs plain; from its foothills, Süphan mountain is visible over the hills to the southeast. The Hınıs plain consists of two distinct, gently undulating bands that are occasionally broken up by low-lying hills. The valley has fertile soil and has historically formed a breeding ground for sheep and horses.

The town of Hınıs itself lies near the upper end of the valley, on a volcanic table raised above the surrounding plain. At this end, more than 20 smaller streams join together into the plain's main river.

=== Climate ===
Hınıs has a dry-summer humid continental climate (Köppen: Dsb). Winters are very cold and snowy, with temperatures consistently below freezing. Summers are dry, with hot days and cool nights.

Climate data for Hınıs (1991–2020)
Month	Jan	Feb	Mar	Apr	May	Jun	Jul	Aug	Sep	Oct	Nov	Dec	Year
Mean daily maximum °C (°F)	−2.9 (26.8)	−1.3 (29.7)	4.2 (39.6)	12.6 (54.7)	18.6 (65.5)	24.2 (75.6)	29.2 (84.6)	29.5 (85.1)	24.6 (76.3)	17.6 (63.7)	8.3 (46.9)	0.3 (32.5)	13.8 (56.8)
Daily mean °C (°F)	−8.2 (17.2)	−7.1 (19.2)	−1.1 (30.0)	6.4 (43.5)	11.6 (52.9)	16.6 (61.9)	21.1 (70.0)	21.1 (70.0)	16.0 (60.8)	9.8 (49.6)	2.1 (35.8)	−4.7 (23.5)	7.0 (44.6)
Mean daily minimum °C (°F)	−13.1 (8.4)	−12.3 (9.9)	−5.8 (21.6)	1.1 (34.0)	5.1 (41.2)	9.2 (48.6)	13.5 (56.3)	13.3 (55.9)	8.1 (46.6)	3.3 (37.9)	−3.0 (26.6)	−9.1 (15.6)	0.9 (33.6)
Average precipitation mm (inches)	46.7 (1.84)	59.5 (2.34)	71.39 (2.81)	75.16 (2.96)	67.15 (2.64)	24.13 (0.95)	14.28 (0.56)	10.77 (0.42)	14.95 (0.59)	47.98 (1.89)	47.76 (1.88)	56.13 (2.21)	535.9 (21.10)
Average precipitation days (≥ 1.0 mm)	7.5	7.4	9.2	9.7	10.8	5.1	2.7	2.6	2.6	7.0	6.4	7.6	78.6
Average relative humidity (%)	78.6	77.7	73.8	65.1	61.3	52.0	44.8	43.6	48.9	61.6	69.0	77.8	62.9
Source: NOAA

== History ==
The Hınıs plain formed the main part of the early medieval Armenian canton of Varazhnunik. During this period (roughly the 4th through 7th centuries), Hınıs was probably a fortified market town. Later, after the Arab conquest of Armenia, the region became divided into several small principalities. Hınıs was "almost certainly" the capital of one of these principalities, which was called Sermatz in Greek sources. Sermatz seems to have covered the old district of Varazhnunik as well as the Varto plain to the southwest. Its rulers were probably vassals of the Kaysite emirs of Malazgirt.

During the Kara Koyunlu period, Hınıs was the capital of a small Kurdish emirate which was a vassal of the emirate of Bitlis, which was in turn a vassal of the Kara Koyunlu themselves. The emirate of Hınıs was mainly based on the Hınıs plain but also extended south of the Murat river to include Lake Nazik and the area around Bulanık. Later, under the Ottoman Empire, Hınıs formed a sanjak of Erzurum Eyalet.

== Monuments ==
=== Castle ===
Hınıs's old castle crowns a small rocky promontory jutting out above a depression in the middle of the plateau. The castle rock is only accessible on one side, by an elevated "neck" connecting it to the rest of the plateau. This "neck" was the starting point for the walls that historically surrounded the town. Only a couple of towers of the castle remain intact today.

=== Mosque ===
The Ulu Cami is beneath the castle rock and outside the town. It dates to 1734 and is traditionally attributed to Ala ed-Din, the bey of Muş who also fortified Mercimekkale on the Muş Plain. The mosque is roughly cube-shaped, with one relatively small pyramidal cap crowning the roof, surrounded by 8 smaller domes. The mosque has one, black-and-white striped minaret, on the northwest corner.

== Composition ==
There are 98 neighbourhoods in Hınıs District:

- Acarköy
- Akbayır
- Akçamelik
- Akgelin
- Akgöze
- Akören
- Alaca
- Alagöz
- Alikırı
- Alınteri
- Altınpınar
- Arpadere
- Aşağı Kayabaşı
- Avcılar
- Bahçe
- Başköy
- Bayırköy
- Bellitaş
- Beyyurdu
- Burhanköy
- Çakmak
- Çamurlu
- Çatak
- Çilligöl
- Dağçayırı
- Demirci
- Derince
- Dervişali
- Dibekli
- Dikili
- Divanhüseyin
- Elbeyli
- Elmadalı
- Erduran
- Erence
- Esenli
- Göller
- Güllüçimen
- Gülüstan
- Gürçayır
- Güzeldere
- Halilçavuş
- Hayran
- Ilıcaköy
- İsmail
- Kalecik
- Karaağaç
- Karabudak
- Karakula
- Karamolla
- Kazancı
- Ketenci
- Kısık
- Kızılahmet
- Kızmusa
- Kolhisar
- Kongur
- Köprübaşı
- Meydanköy
- Mezraa
- Mollacelil
- Mollakulaç
- Mutluca
- Ortaköy
- Ovaçevirme
- Ovakozlu
- Parmaksız
- Pınarbaşı
- Pınarköy
- Şahabettinköy
- Şahverdi
- Şalgamköy
- Saltepe
- Sanayi
- Sarılı
- Sıldız
- Söğütlü
- Sultanlı
- Suvaran
- Tanır
- Tapuköy
- Taşbulak
- Tellitepe
- Tipideresi
- Toprakkale
- Toraman
- Uluçayır
- Ünlüce
- Uyanık
- Yamanlar
- Yaylakonak
- Yelpiz
- Yenikent
- Yeniköy
- Yeşilbahçe
- Yeşilyazı
- Yolüstü
- Yukarı Kayabaşı
