= Beyyurdu =

Beyyurdu can refer to:

- Beyyurdu, Hınıs
- Beyyurdu, Şemdinli
- Beyyurdu, Sungurlu
- Beyyurdu Dam
