= Brown mushroom =

Brown mushroom is a general description that may apply number of wild and cultivated mushrooms, and may refer specifically to:

- Little brown mushroom, any of a large number of small, dull-coloured agaric species of interest to mushroom hunters
- Agaricus bisporus, common cultivated mushroom known by many names including "brown mushroom"
- Pleurotus eryngii, known as the king brown mushroom among other common names
- 🍄‍🟫, Brown Mushroom emoji, often used to represent edible mushrooms
