= Derince (disambiguation) =

Derince can refer to:

- Derince
- Derince, Hınıs
- Derince, Hizan
- Derince, Kozluk
- Derince, Sason
- Derince railway station
