= Ertan =

Ertan is a Turkish masculine given name. The meaning of the Turkish name is “sunrise”, “dawn” or “early morning hour”. It may refer to:

== Given name ==
- Ertan Adatepe (born 1938), Turkish footballer
- Ertan Demiri (born 1979), Macedonian football player
- Ertan Irizik (born 1964), Turkish-Swiss footballer
- Ertan Tombak (born 1999), Bulgarian footballer of Turkish descent
- Ertan Uyanık (born 1979), Turkish-Austrian futsal player
- Ertan Baştuğ (born 1976), Turkish taekwando practitioner

== Surname ==
- Deniz Ertan (born 2004), Turkish female swimmer
- Mustafa Ertan (1926–2005), Turkish footballer
- Semra Ertan (1956–1982), Turkish migrant worker and writer in Germany

== See also ==
- Ertan Dam, an arch dam on the Yalong River in southwest China
