= Marufköy, Karaçoban =

Village in Turkey

Marufköy
- Neighbourhood
- Location in Turkey
- Coordinates: 39°18′32″N 41°54′49″E
- Country: Turkey
- Province: Erzurum
- District: Karaçoban
- Population (2022): 485
- Time zone: UTC+3 (TRT)

Marufköy is a neighbourhood in the municipality and district of Karaçoban, Erzurum Province in Turkey. Its population is 485 (2022).
