= Avcılar, Hınıs =

Village in Turkey

Avcılar
- Neighbourhood
- Location in Turkey
- Coordinates: 39°19′27″N 41°35′51″E
- Country: Turkey
- Province: Erzurum
- District: Hınıs
- Population (2022): 78
- Time zone: UTC+3 (TRT)

Avcılar is a neighbourhood in the municipality and district of Hınıs, Erzurum Province in Turkey. Its population is 78 (2022).
