= Güzeldere, Hınıs =

Village in Turkey

Güzeldere
- Neighbourhood
- Location in Turkey
- Coordinates: 39.419444°N 41.481667°E
- Country: Turkey
- Province: Erzurum
- District: Hınıs
- Population (2022): 33
- Time zone: UTC+3 (TRT)

Güzeldere is a neighbourhood in the municipality and district of Hınıs, Erzurum Province in Turkey. Its population is 33 (2022).
