= Şahabettinköy, Hınıs =

Village in Turkey

Şahabettinköy
- Neighbourhood
- Location in Turkey
- Coordinates: 39°18′20″N 41°53′11″E
- Country: Turkey
- Province: Erzurum
- District: Hınıs
- Population (2022): 195
- Time zone: UTC+3 (TRT)

Şahabettinköy is a neighbourhood in the municipality and district of Hınıs, Erzurum Province in Turkey. Its population is 195 (2022).
