= Kalecik, Hınıs =

Village in Turkey

Kalecik
- Neighbourhood
- Location in Turkey
- Coordinates: 39.424444°N 41.536944°E
- Country: Turkey
- Province: Erzurum
- District: Hınıs
- Population (2022): 40
- Time zone: UTC+3 (TRT)

Kalecik is a neighbourhood in the municipality and district of Hınıs, Erzurum Province in Turkey. Its population is 40 (2022).
