= Karmış, Karaçoban =

Village in Turkey

Karmış
- Neighbourhood
- Location in Turkey
- Coordinates: 39°20′26″N 41°55′52″E
- Country: Turkey
- Province: Erzurum
- District: Karaçoban
- Population (2022): 70
- Time zone: UTC+3 (TRT)

Karmış is a neighbourhood in the municipality and district of Karaçoban, Erzurum Province in Turkey. Its population is 70 (2022).
