= Çatak, Hınıs =

Village in Turkey

Çatak
- Neighbourhood
- Location in Turkey
- Coordinates: 39.281869°N 41.719982°E
- Country: Turkey
- Province: Erzurum
- District: Hınıs
- Population (2022): 69
- Time zone: UTC+3 (TRT)

Çatak is a neighbourhood in the municipality and district of Hınıs, Erzurum Province in Turkey. Its population is 69 (2022).
