= Dedeören, Karaçoban =

Village in Turkey

Dedeören
- Neighbourhood
- Location in Turkey
- Coordinates: 39°22′01″N 41°57′06″E
- Country: Turkey
- Province: Erzurum
- District: Karaçoban
- Population (2022): 453
- Time zone: UTC+3 (TRT)

Dedeören is a neighbourhood in the municipality and district of Karaçoban, Erzurum Province in Turkey. Its population is 453 (2022).
