= Alaca, Hınıs =

Village in Turkey

Alaca
- Neighbourhood
- Location in Turkey
- Coordinates: 39°23′29″N 41°36′30″E
- Country: Turkey
- Province: Erzurum
- District: Hınıs
- Population (2022): 131
- Time zone: UTC+3 (TRT)

Alaca is a neighbourhood in the municipality and district of Hınıs, Erzurum Province in Turkey. Its population is 131 (2022).
