= Dibekli, Hınıs =

Village in Turkey

Dibekli
- Neighbourhood
- Location in Turkey
- Coordinates: 39.556944°N 41.664722°E
- Country: Turkey
- Province: Erzurum
- District: Hınıs
- Population (2022): 85
- Time zone: UTC+3 (TRT)

Dibekli is a neighbourhood in the municipality and district of Hınıs, Erzurum Province in Turkey. Its population is 85 (2022).
