= Esenli, Hınıs =

Village in Turkey

Esenli
- Neighbourhood
- Country: Turkey
- Province: Erzurum
- District: Hınıs
- Population (2021): 19
- Time zone: UTC+3 (TRT)

Esenli is a neighbourhood in the municipality and district of Hınıs, Erzurum Province in Turkey. Its population is 19 (2021).
