= Mollakulaç, Hınıs =

Village in Turkey

Mollakulaç
- Neighbourhood
- Location in Turkey
- Coordinates: 39°18′N 41°43′E
- Country: Turkey
- Province: Erzurum
- District: Hınıs
- Population (2022): 104
- Time zone: UTC+3 (TRT)

Mollakulaç is a neighbourhood in the municipality and district of Hınıs, Erzurum Province in Turkey. Its population is 104 (2022).
