= Karagöz, Karaçoban =

Village in Turkey

Karagöz
- Neighbourhood
- Location in Turkey
- Coordinates: 39°19′57″N 42°11′44″E
- Country: Turkey
- Province: Erzurum
- District: Karaçoban
- Population (2022): 194
- Time zone: UTC+3 (TRT)

Karagöz is a neighbourhood in the municipality and district of Karaçoban, Erzurum Province in Turkey. Its population is 194 (2022).
