= Ovayoncalı, Karaçoban =

Village in Turkey

Ovayoncalı
- Neighbourhood
- Location in Turkey
- Coordinates: 39°20′42″N 41°58′09″E
- Country: Turkey
- Province: Erzurum
- District: Karaçoban
- Population (2022): 200
- Time zone: UTC+3 (TRT)

Ovayoncalı is a neighbourhood in the municipality and district of Karaçoban, Erzurum Province in Turkey. Its population is 200 (2022).
