= Arpadere, Hınıs =

Village in Turkey

Arpadere
- Neighbourhood
- Location in Turkey
- Coordinates: 39°10′36″N 41°38′06″E
- Country: Turkey
- Province: Erzurum
- District: Hınıs
- Population (2022): 31
- Time zone: UTC+3 (TRT)

Arpadere is a neighbourhood in the municipality and district of Hınıs, Erzurum Province in Turkey. Its population is 31 (2022).
