= Yolüstü, Hınıs =

Village in Turkey

Yolüstü
- Neighbourhood
- Location in Turkey
- Coordinates: 39.316389°N 41.7475°E
- Country: Turkey
- Province: Erzurum
- District: Hınıs
- Population (2022): 242
- Time zone: UTC+3 (TRT)

Yolüstü is a neighbourhood in the municipality and district of Hınıs, Erzurum Province in Turkey. Its population is 242 (2022).
