= Tellitepe, Hınıs =

Village in Turkey

Tellitepe
- Neighbourhood
- Location in Turkey
- Coordinates: 39°16′03″N 41°44′30″E
- Country: Turkey
- Province: Erzurum
- District: Hınıs
- Population (2022): 66
- Time zone: UTC+3 (TRT)

Tellitepe is a neighbourhood in the municipality and district of Hınıs, Erzurum Province in Turkey. Its population is 66 (2022).
