= Hınıs Plain =

Plain in the Armenian Highlands

The Hınıs Plain (Turkish: Hınıs Ovası), is located in the eastern of the city center of Hınıs.

== Geology and geomorphology ==
Hınıs Plain is located in the east of the Bingöl Mountains, surrounded by high mountains and at an altitude of 1700 meters from the sea, 45 kilometers long and 20 kilometers wide. The plain is surrounded by the Bingöl mountains in the west and the Akdoğan Mountains in the south by the Ak mountains in the east.
