= Şalgamköy, Hınıs =

Village in Turkey

Şalgamköy
- Neighbourhood
- Location within Turkey
- Coordinates: 39°27′N 41°35′E
- Country: Turkey
- Province: Erzurum
- District: Hınıs
- Population (2022): 103
- Time zone: UTC+3 (TRT)

Şalgamköy is a neighbourhood in the municipality and district of Hınıs, Erzurum Province in Turkey. As of 2022, its population was 103.
