= Akgöze, Hınıs =

Village in Turkey

Akgöze
- Neighbourhood
- Location in Turkey
- Coordinates: 39°15′40″N 41°39′44″E
- Country: Turkey
- Province: Erzurum
- District: Hınıs
- Population (2022): 16
- Time zone: UTC+3 (TRT)

Akgöze is a neighbourhood in the municipality and district of Hınıs, Erzurum Province in Turkey. Its population is 16 (2022).
