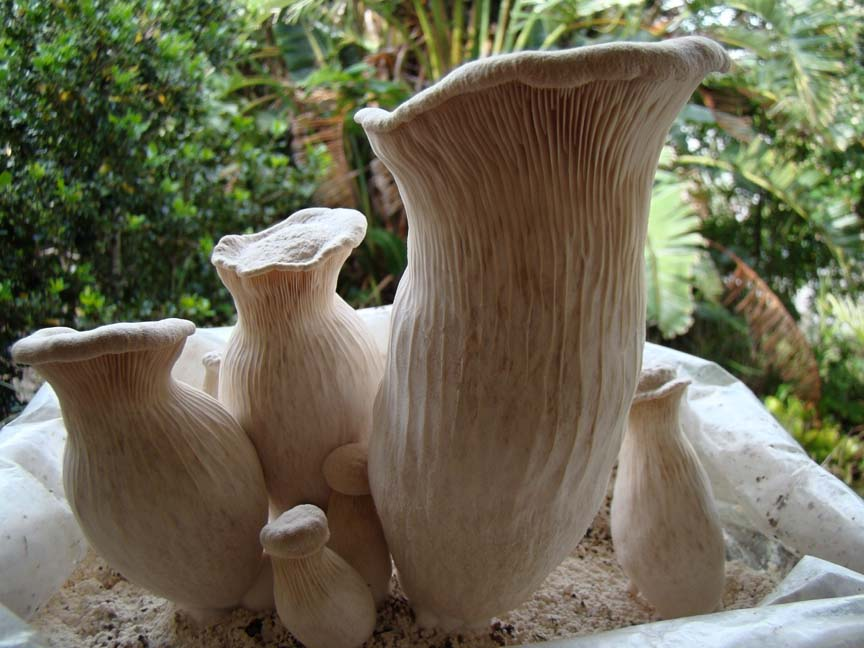

Conservation status
- Critically Endangered (IUCN 3.1)

Scientific classification
- Kingdom: Fungi
- Division: Basidiomycota
- Class: Agaricomycetes
- Order: Agaricales
- Family: Pleurotaceae
- Genus: Pleurotus
- Species: P. nebrodensis

Binomial name
- Pleurotus nebrodensis (Inzenga) Quél.

= Pleurotus nebrodensis =

Species of fungus

Pleurotus nebrodensis
- Mycological characteristics
- Gills on hymenium
- Cap is depressed or offset
- Hymenium is decurrent
- Stipe is bare
- Spore print is white
- Ecology is saprotrophic
- Edibility is choice

Pleurotus nebrodensis, commonly known as funcia di basilicu "fungus of basilisk" or carduncieddu di macchia "macchia carduncieddu(?)", is a fungus that was declared by the IUCN as critically endangered in 2006. This fungus only grows on limestone in northern Sicily in association with the common basilisk, Prangos ferulacea (family Apiaceae). The characteristics of the mushroom are its creamy white to yellow colour, its diameter of between 5 and 20 centimeters (2 and 8 in), its extremely angled gills, and the breaking apart of the cap surface at maturity.

== Taxonomy ==
The first record of the mushroom was in 1866 by Italian botanist Giuseppe Inzenga, who named it Agaricus nebrodensis; it was described as "the most delicious mushroom of the Sicilian mycological flora". This was widely agreed upon, which has led to widespread cultivation, by professionals and amateurs. In 1886, French mycologist Lucien Quélet transferred the species to the genus Pleurotus. Recent research has shown that P. nebrodensis is closely related to, but unique from, Pleurotus eryngii, which also occurs in the Mediterranean Basin and is also associated with plants in the family Apiaceae.

== Decline ==
Pleurotus nebrodensis was classified as critically endangered because it is found in an area of less than 100 square kilometers (39 sq mi), and the population has become fractured. In addition, there are not as many mature fungi, and it is losing its natural habitat. An additional reason for the decline is that collectors are now picking unripe specimens. It is currently estimated that fewer than 250 Pleurotus nebrodensis reach maturity every year.

== Conservation ==
Currently there are no laws to protect Pleurotus nebrodensis. Even in protected areas there has not been a ban on picking of unripe specimens. However, a draft of rules has been created, and could be approved. This draft proposes protecting all ages of the Pleurotus nebrodensis in one part of Madonie Park, a sanctuary, while in another section of the park it will protect any non-mature mushroom. In addition to this, this fungus is being grown, like a crop, to reduce the strain on the wild population. These fungi that are cultivated for conservation are produced in tunnels that are covered by black nets. These cultivated fungi have the same flavor and aroma as the wild specimens.

== See also ==
- List of Pleurotus species
