= Ovakozlu, Hınıs =

Village in Turkey

Ovakozlu
- Neighbourhood
- Location in Turkey
- Coordinates: 39°24′29″N 41°51′23″E
- Country: Turkey
- Province: Erzurum
- District: Hınıs
- Population (2022): 905
- Time zone: UTC+3 (TRT)

Ovakozlu is a neighbourhood in the municipality and district of Hınıs, Erzurum Province in Turkey. Its population is 905 (2022).
