= Budaklı, Karaçoban =

Village in Turkey

Budaklı
- Neighbourhood
- Location in Turkey
- Coordinates: 39°19′26″N 42°01′42″E
- Country: Turkey
- Province: Erzurum
- District: Karaçoban
- Population (2022): 404
- Time zone: UTC+3 (TRT)

Budaklı is a neighbourhood in the municipality and district of Karaçoban, Erzurum Province in Turkey. Its population is 404 (2022).
