= Kızmusa, Hınıs =

Village in Turkey

Kızmusa
- Neighbourhood
- Location in Turkey
- Coordinates: 39°24′00″N 41°46′07″E
- Country: Turkey
- Province: Erzurum
- District: Hınıs
- Population (2022): 60
- Time zone: UTC+3 (TRT)

Kızmusa is a neighbourhood in the municipality and district of Hınıs, Erzurum Province in Turkey. Its population is 60 (2022).
