= Akkavak, Karaçoban =

Village in Turkey

Akkavak
- Neighbourhood
- Location in Turkey
- Coordinates: 39°16′41″N 41°59′54″E
- Country: Turkey
- Province: Erzurum
- District: Karaçoban
- Population (2022): 80
- Time zone: UTC+3 (TRT)

Akkavak is a neighbourhood in the municipality and district of Karaçoban, Erzurum Province in Turkey. Its population is 80 (2022).
