= Kızılahmet, Hınıs =

Village in Turkey

Kızılahmet
- Neighbourhood
- Location in Turkey
- Coordinates: 39°14′53″N 41°49′53″E
- Country: Turkey
- Province: Erzurum
- District: Hınıs
- Population (2022): 294
- Time zone: UTC+3 (TRT)

Kızılahmet is a neighbourhood in the municipality and district of Hınıs, Erzurum Province in Turkey. Its population is 294 (2022).
