= Dağçayırı, Hınıs =

Village in Turkey

Dağçayırı
- Neighbourhood
- Location in Turkey
- Coordinates: 39.1945°N 41.7831°E
- Country: Turkey
- Province: Erzurum
- District: Hınıs
- Population (2022): 237
- Time zone: UTC+3 (TRT)

Dağçayırı is a neighbourhood in the municipality and district of Hınıs, Erzurum Province in Turkey. Its population is 237 (2022).
