= Bozyer, Karaçoban =

Village in Turkey

Bozyer
- Neighbourhood
- Location in Turkey
- Coordinates: 39°15′03″N 42°01′05″E
- Country: Turkey
- Province: Erzurum
- District: Karaçoban
- Population (2022): 274
- Time zone: UTC+3 (TRT)

Bozyer is a neighbourhood in the municipality and district of Karaçoban, Erzurum Province in Turkey. Its population is 274 (2022).
