= Kuşluca, Karaçoban =

Village in Turkey

Kuşluca
- Neighbourhood
- Location in Turkey
- Coordinates: 39°15′45″N 42°02′23″E
- Country: Turkey
- Province: Erzurum
- District: Karaçoban
- Population (2022): 211
- Time zone: UTC+3 (TRT)

Kuşluca is a neighbourhood in the municipality and district of Karaçoban, Erzurum Province in Turkey. Its population is 211 (2022).

== History ==
The old name of the neighborhood is Zernak in the records of 1916, and the word "dzernag" in Armenian means "swallow". The village includes the Zernak Castle, which was first built in the iron age. It was rebuilt during the Byzantine period and used in the battle of Manzikert. The castle was last rebuilt and used by Alaaddin Pasha, one of the Beys of Muş, in 1134. The castle has reached the present day in a very destructive way due to the wars and occupations.
