= Ketenci, Hınıs =

Village in Turkey

Ketenci
- Neighbourhood
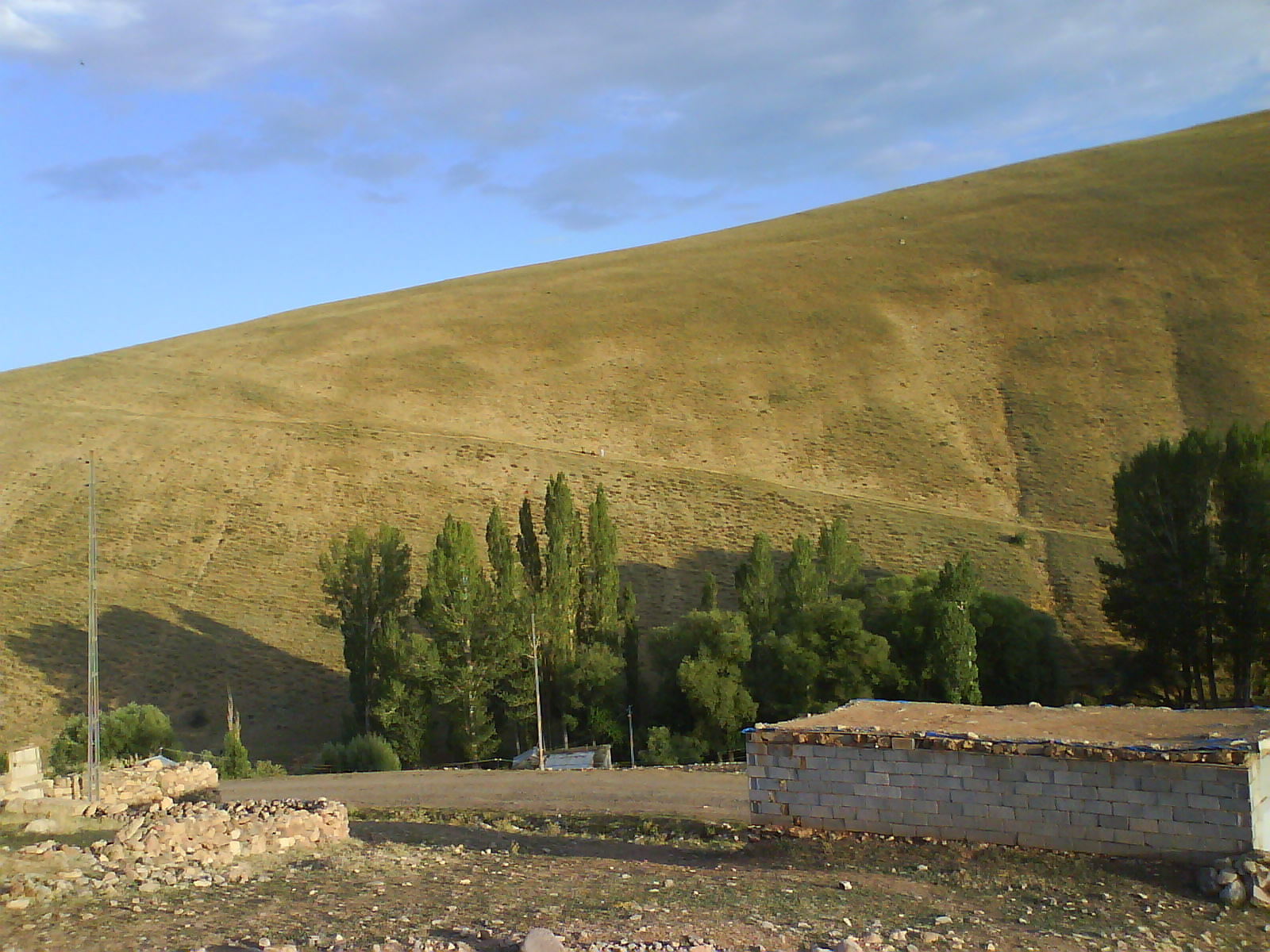

- Location within Turkey
- Coordinates: 39°28′N 41°40′E
- Country: Turkey
- Province: Erzurum
- District: Hınıs
- Population (2022): 196
- Time zone: UTC+3 (TRT)

Ketenci is a neighbourhood in the municipality and district of Hınıs, Erzurum Province in Turkey. Its population is 196 (2022).
