= Kırımkaya, Karaçoban =

Village in Turkey

Kırımkaya
- Neighbourhood
- Location in Turkey
- Coordinates: 39°21′52″N 42°09′38″E
- Country: Turkey
- Province: Erzurum
- District: Karaçoban
- Population (2022): 975
- Time zone: UTC+3 (TRT)

Kırımkaya is a neighbourhood in the municipality and district of Karaçoban, Erzurum Province in Turkey. Its population is 975 (2022).
