= Akören, Hınıs =

Village in Turkey

Akören
- Neighbourhood
- Location in Turkey
- Coordinates: 39°28′30″N 41°43′26″E
- Country: Turkey
- Province: Erzurum
- District: Hınıs
- Population (2022): 263
- Time zone: UTC+3 (TRT)

Akören is a neighbourhood in the municipality and district of Hınıs, Erzurum Province in Turkey. Its population is 263 (2022).
