= Gündüzköy, Karaçoban =

Village in Turkey

Gündüzköy
- Neighbourhood
- Location in Turkey
- Coordinates: 39°23′28″N 42°06′25″E
- Country: Turkey
- Province: Erzurum
- District: Karaçoban
- Population (2022): 789
- Time zone: UTC+3 (TRT)

Gündüzköy is a neighbourhood in the municipality and district of Karaçoban, Erzurum Province in Turkey. Its population is 789 (2022).
