= Çilligöl, Hınıs =

Village in Turkey

Çilligöl
- Neighbourhood
- Location in Turkey
- Coordinates: 39.204722°N 41.752778°E
- Country: Turkey
- Province: Erzurum
- District: Hınıs
- Population (2022): 226
- Time zone: UTC+3 (TRT)

Çilligöl is a neighbourhood in the municipality and district of Hınıs, Erzurum Province in Turkey. Its population is 226 (2022).
