= Karaköprü, Karaçoban =

Village in Turkey

Karaköprü
- Neighbourhood
- Location in Turkey
- Coordinates: 39°18′57″N 41°57′52″E
- Country: Turkey
- Province: Erzurum
- District: Karaçoban
- Population (2022): 645
- Time zone: UTC+3 (TRT)

Karaköprü is a neighbourhood in the municipality and district of Karaçoban, Erzurum Province in Turkey. Its population is 645 (2022).
