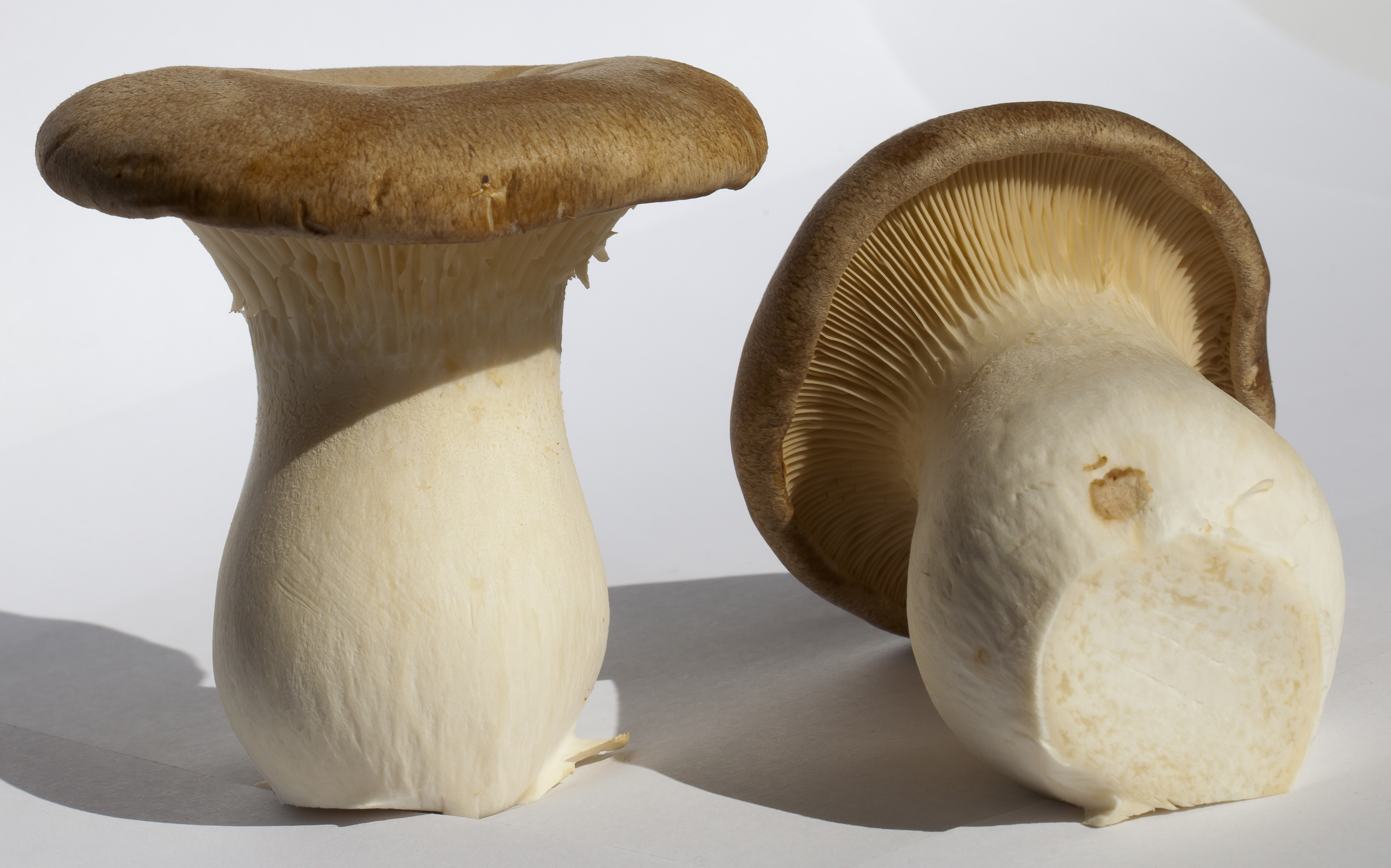

Scientific classification
- Kingdom: Fungi
- Division: Basidiomycota
- Class: Agaricomycetes
- Order: Agaricales
- Family: Pleurotaceae
- Genus: Pleurotus
- Species: P. eryngii

Binomial name
- Pleurotus eryngii (DC.) Quél. 1872

= Pleurotus eryngii =

Species of edible mushroom

Pleurotus eryngii
- Mycological characteristics
- Gills on hymenium
- Cap is depressed or offset
- Hymenium is decurrent
- Stipe is bare
- Spore print is white
- Ecology is saprotrophic
- Edibility is choice

Pleurotus eryngii (also known as king trumpet mushroom, French horn mushroom, eryngi, king oyster mushroom, king brown mushroom, boletus of the steppes, (Note: The name "boletus of the steppes" is misleading as P. eryngii is a gilled mushroom in order Agaricales, and Boletus is a genus of mushrooms with pores rather than gills in order Boletales.) trumpet royale, aliʻi oyster) is an Old World species of fungus.

== Taxonomy ==
The species name is derived from the fact that it grows in association with the roots of Eryngium campestre or other Eryngium plants (English names: 'sea holly' or 'eryngo'). P. eryngii is a species complex and a number of varieties have been described, with differing plant associates in the carrot family.

- Pleurotus eryngii var. eryngii (DC.) Quél 1872 – associated with Eryngium ssp.
- Pleurotus eryngii var. ferulae (Lanzi) Sacc. 1887 – associated with Ferula communis
- Pleurotus eryngii var. tingitanus Lewinsohn 2002 – associated with Ferula tingitana
- Pleurotus eryngii var. elaeoselini Venturella, Zervakis & La Rocca 2000 – associated with Elaeoselinum asclepium
- Pleurotus eryngii var. thapsiae Venturella, Zervakis & Saitta 2002 – associated with Thapsia garganica

Other specimens of P. eryngii have been reported in association with plants in the genera Ferulago, Cachrys, Laserpitium, and Diplotaenia, all in Apiaceae.

Molecular studies have shown P. nebrodensis to be closely related to, but distinct from, P. eryngii. Pleurotus fossulatus may be another closely related species.

=== Phylogeny ===
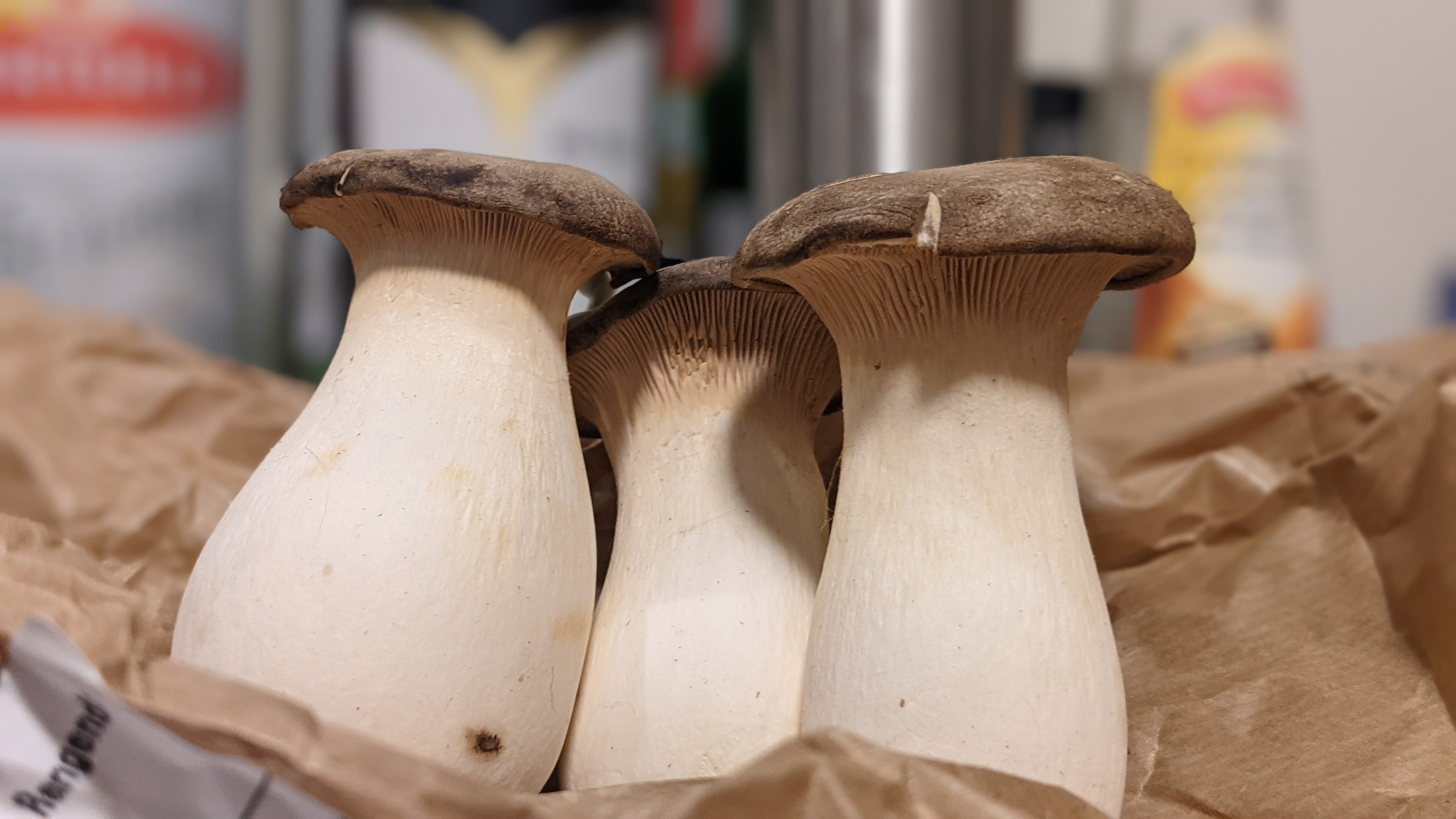
Close-up

Pleurotus populations growing on umbellifers seem to have recently diverged through a sympatric speciation process that is based on both intrinsic reproductive barriers and extrinsic ecogeographical factors.

== Description ==
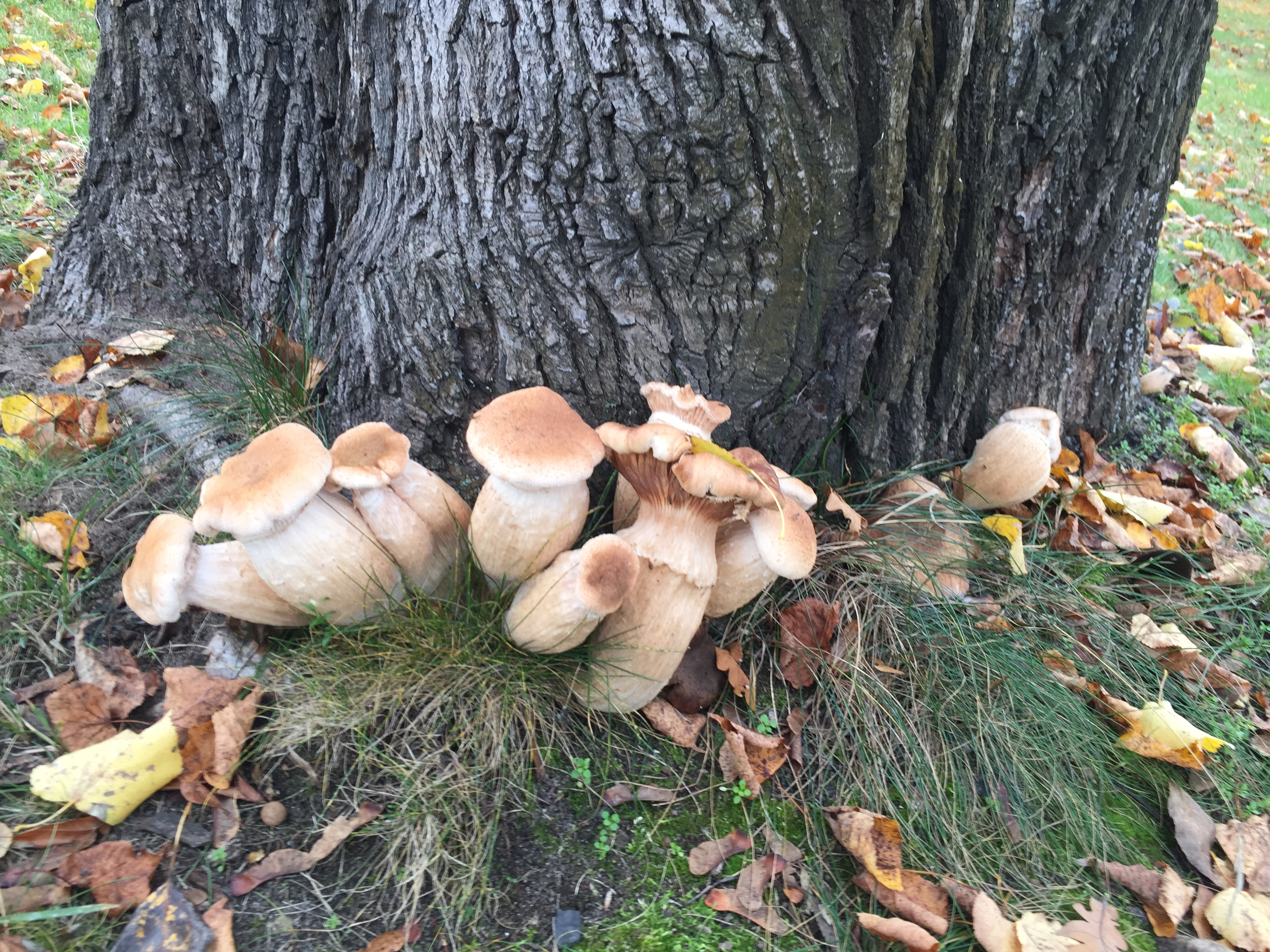
Growing wild in Poland

The tannish cap is 4–15 centimetres (1 1/2–6 in) wide, smooth and slightly velvety. It is convex then flattens, with a thin margin that is initially inrolled then spreads out. The whitish gills are decurrent, dense and anastomosed. The whitish stem is 3–10 cm (1 1/4–4 in) tall and 1–3 cm wide.

== Distribution and habitat ==
Its natural range extends from the Atlantic Ocean through the Mediterranean Basin (including North Africa) and Central Europe into Western Asia and India.

Unlike other species of Pleurotus, which are primarily wood-decay fungi, the P. eryngii complex are also weak parasites on the roots of herbaceous plants in the carrot family, although they may also be cultured on organic wastes.

== Ecology ==
Pleurotus eryngii is a saprotrophic fungus. It grows in association with members of the carrot family including Eryngium species.

It is also a nematode-trapping fungus, thereby receiving nutrition. This provides phylogenetic clues about its apparent diversion from saprophytism about 419 million years ago (Mya) following the origin of nematodes (about 550–600 Mya), possibly suggesting their coevolution.

Pleurotus eryngii extract reduced the number of Panagrellus species larvae after 24 hours by 90%. P. eryngii has predatory activity against Panagrellus species larvae due to toxin production and negatively affects Meloidogyne javanica eggs and juveniles development.

== Uses ==
The mushroom has a good shelf life and is widely cultivated. It has little flavor or aroma when raw. When cooked, it develops rich umami flavor and a meaty texture. Random amplified polymorphic DNA (RAPD) methods can be used in the mushroom industry for the classification and maintenance of high-quality mushroom spawns. P. eryngii are commercially produced, edible mushrooms, comprising 30% of the Korean edible mushroom market since its introduction in 1995. It is commonly used as a meat substitute.

Pleurotus eryngii may contain chemicals that stimulate the immune system. Dietary intake of P. eryngii may function as cholesterol-lowering dietary agent.

Like some other Pleurotus species, P. eryngii attacks nematodes and may provide a control method for these parasites when they infect cats and dogs.

It is very frequently used in Apulian cuisine. An example of this is when it is put on top of orecchiette.

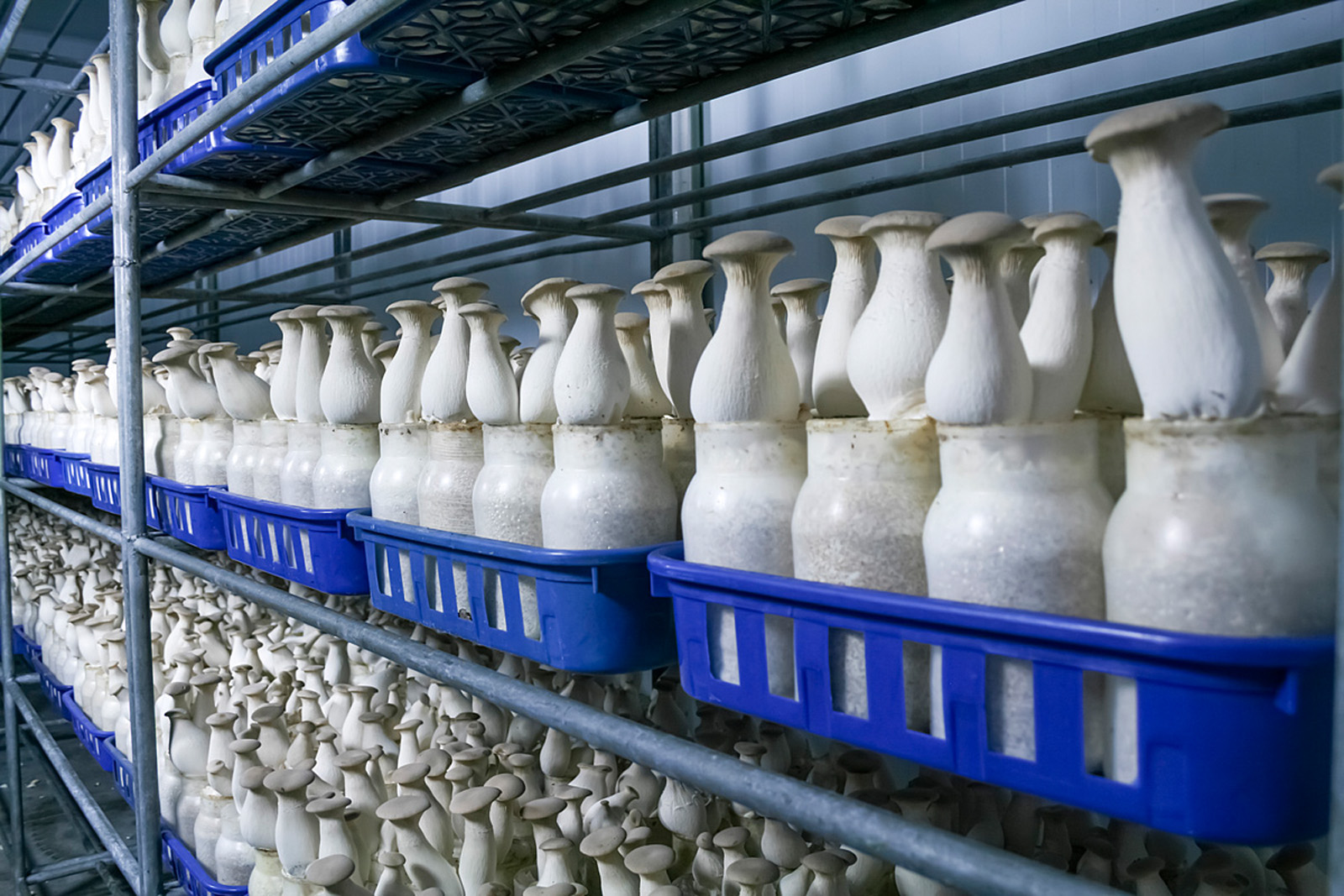
Cultivated in Spain

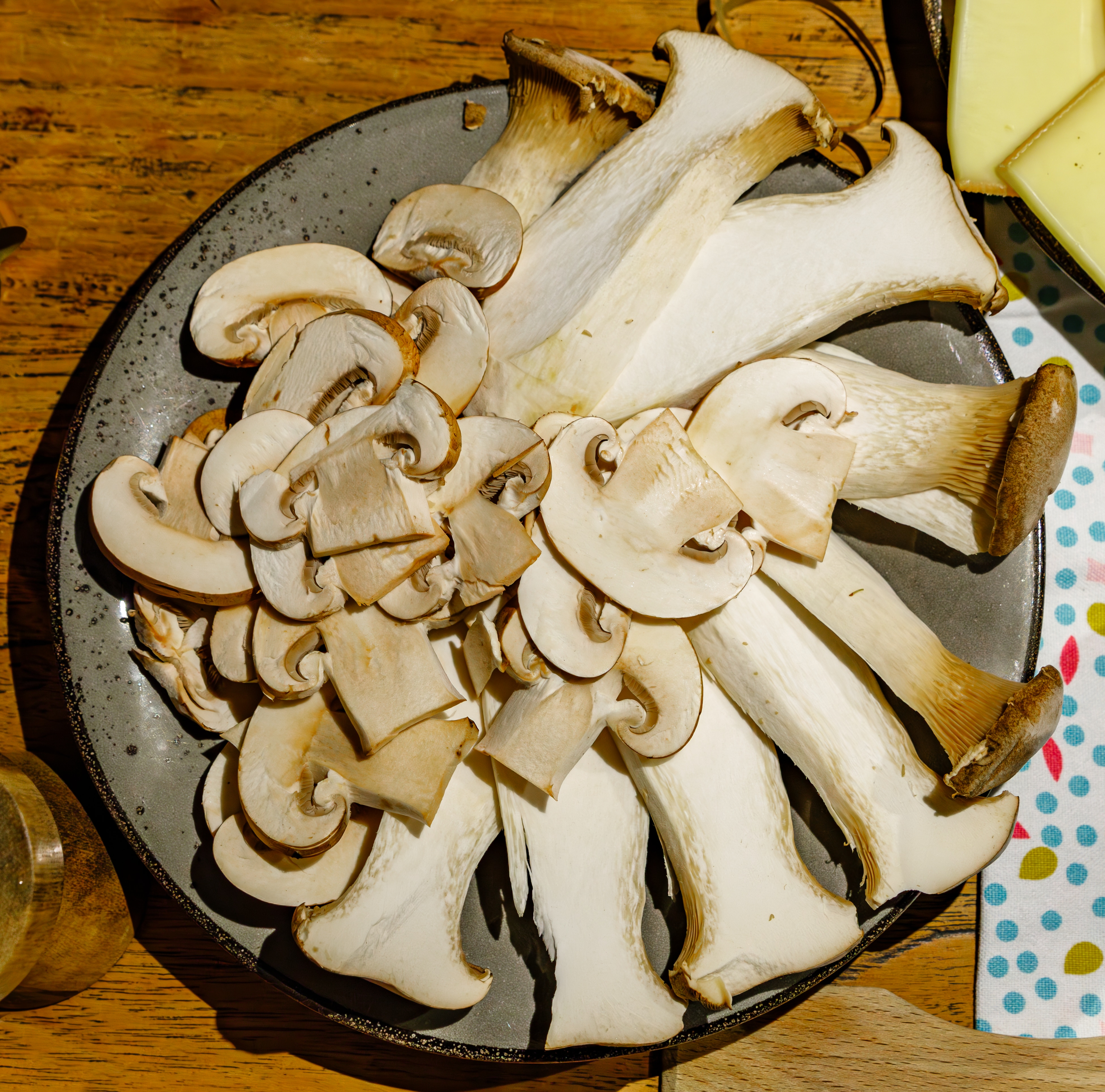
Sliced mushrooms

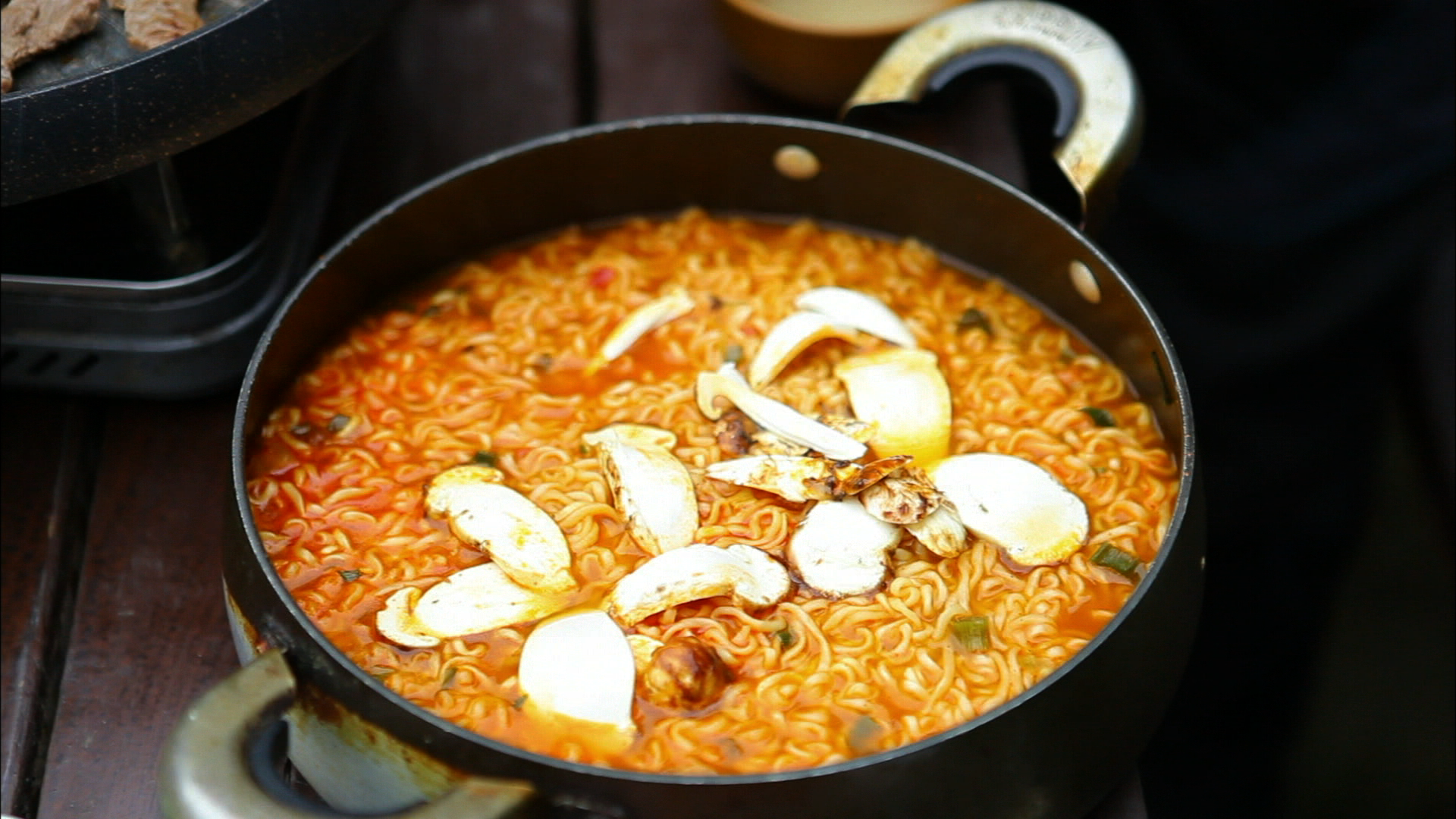
With ramyeon

In Korean barbeque

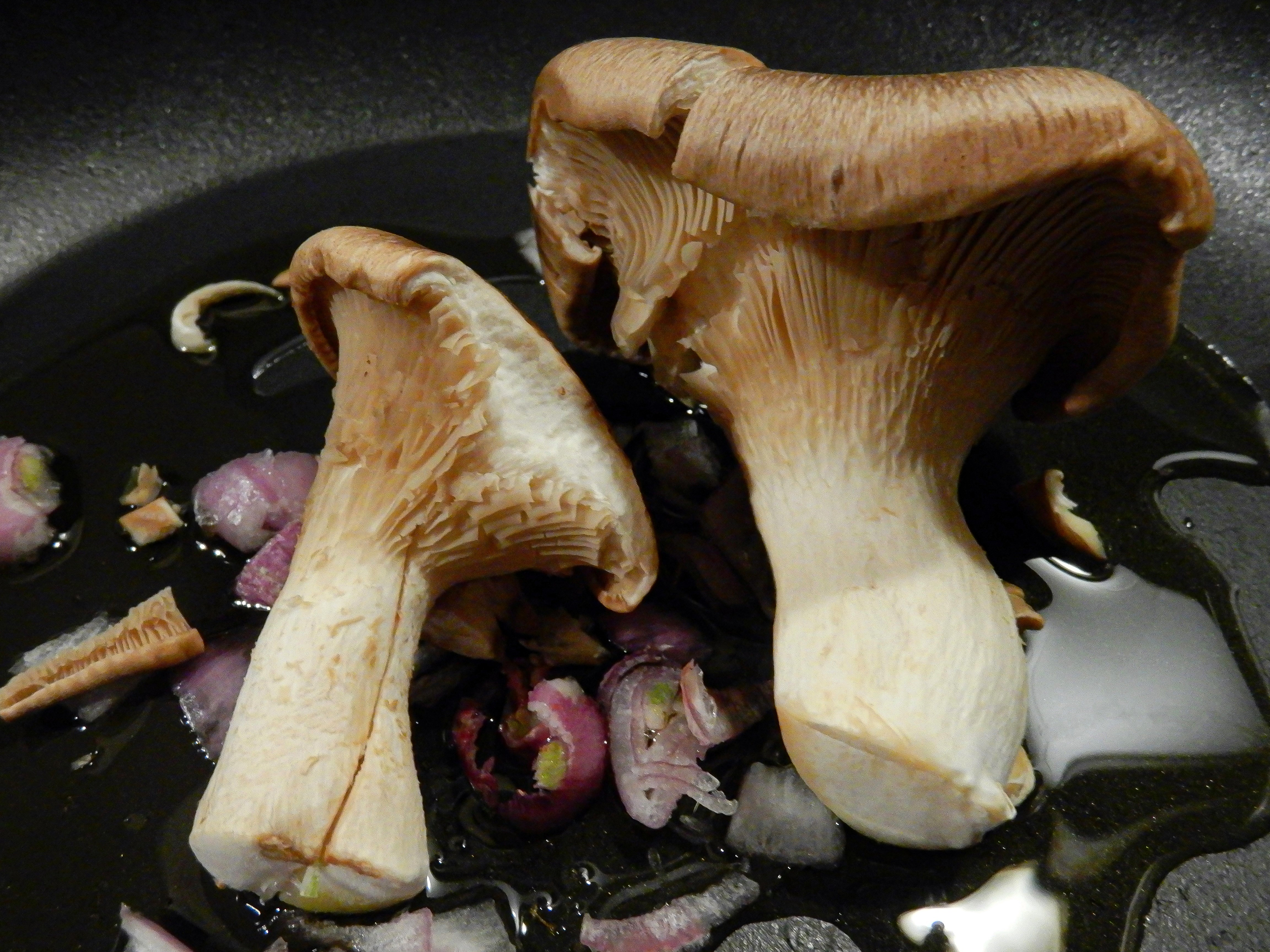
With shallots

== See also ==
- List of Pleurotus species
- Medicinal uses of fungi
