= Burnaz, Karaçoban =

Village in Turkey

Burnaz
- Neighbourhood
- Location in Turkey
- Coordinates: 39°20′43″N 41°59′32″E
- Country: Turkey
- Province: Erzurum
- District: Karaçoban
- Population (2022): 758
- Time zone: UTC+3 (TRT)

Burnaz is a neighbourhood in the municipality and district of Karaçoban, Erzurum Province in Turkey. Its population is 758 (2022).
