= Karaçoban =

- District and municipality
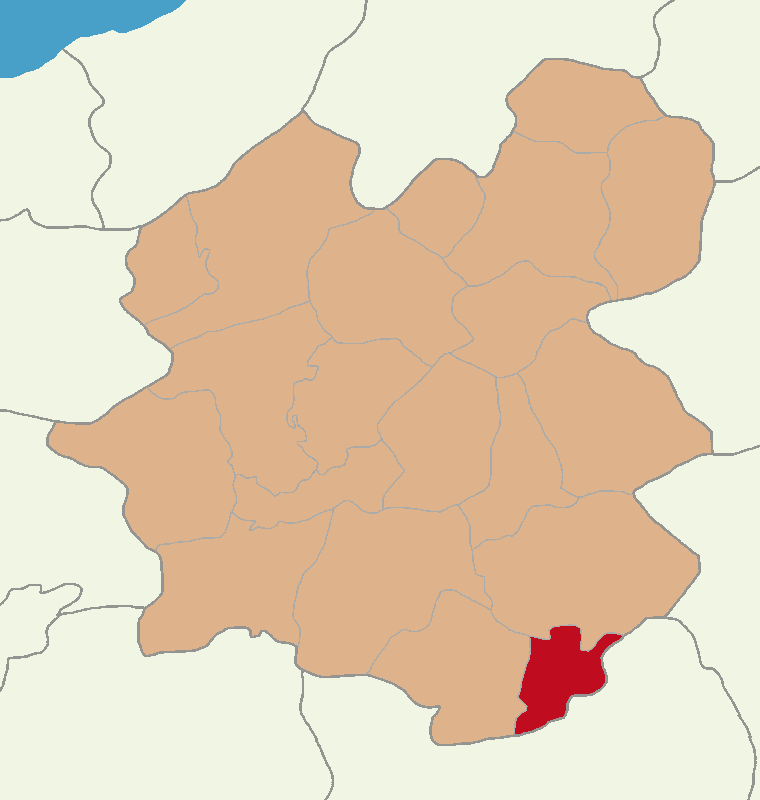
- Map showing Karaçoban District in Erzurum Province

- Location within Turkey
- Coordinates: 39°21′03″N 42°06′43″E
- Country: Turkey
- Province: Erzurum

Government
  - Mayor: Halit Uğun (HDP)
- Area: 571 km^{2} (220 sq mi)
- Elevation: 1,550 m (5,090 ft)
- Population (2022): 22,250
  - Density: 39.0/km^{2} (101/sq mi)
- Time zone: UTC+3 (TRT)
- Postal code: 25610
- Area code: 0442
- Climate: Dfb
- Website: www.karacoban.bel.tr

Karaçoban (Kurdish: Qere Şivan) is a municipality and district of Erzurum Province, Turkey. Its area is 571 km^{2}, and its population is 22,250 (2022).

== Geography ==
Geomap of region

There is Karayazı district in the north and northeast of the district, Hınıs district in the southwest, Bulanık district of Muş in the south and southeast, and Malazgirt district of Muş in the east. The district center is built on the narrow and long alluvial filling of the Hınıs Stream, which forms an important tributary of the Murat River, extending east–west. It is surrounded by Akdağ (2953 m) in the north, Akdoğan Mountains (2879m) in the south and Güzelbaba Mountains (2100 m) in the east. There is a Lake Ahır in the northwest of the district center.

== Tourism ==
The main touristic places in Karaçoban district are Zernak Castle in Kuşluca village.

== Composition ==
There are 27 neighbourhoods in Karaçoban District:

- Akkavak
- Bağlar
- Bahçeli
- Binpınar
- Bozyer
- Budaklı
- Burnaz
- Çatalgül
- Dedeören
- Doğanbey
- Duman
- Erenler
- Erhanlar
- Gündüzköy
- Hacılar
- Karagöz
- Karaköprü
- Karmış
- Kavaklı
- Kırımkaya
- Kopal
- Kuşluca
- Marufköy
- Molladavut
- Ovayoncalı
- Sarıveli
- Seyhan
