= Tapuköy, Hınıs =

Village in Turkey

Tapuköy
- Neighbourhood
- Location in Turkey
- Coordinates: 39°22′39″N 41°39′28″E
- Country: Turkey
- Province: Erzurum
- District: Hınıs
- Population (2022): 85
- Time zone: UTC+3 (TRT)

Tapuköy is a neighbourhood in the municipality and district of Hınıs, Erzurum Province in Turkey. Its population is 85 (2022).
