= Altınpınar, Hınıs =

Village in Turkey

Altınpınar
- Neighbourhood
- Location in Turkey
- Coordinates: 39°22′18″N 41°37′7″E
- Country: Turkey
- Province: Erzurum
- District: Hınıs
- Population (2022): 195
- Time zone: UTC+3 (TRT)

Altınpınar is a neighbourhood in the municipality and district of Hınıs, Erzurum Province in Turkey. Its population is 195 (2022).
