= Kongur, Hınıs =

Village in Turkey

Kongur
- Neighbourhood
- Location in Turkey
- Coordinates: 39°14′22″N 41°51′19″E
- Country: Turkey
- Province: Erzurum
- District: Hınıs
- Population (2022): 356
- Time zone: UTC+3 (TRT)

Kongur is a neighbourhood in the municipality and district of Hınıs, Erzurum Province in Turkey. Its population is 356 (2022).
