= Çatalgül, Karaçoban =

Village in Turkey

Çatalgül
- Neighbourhood
- Location in Turkey
- Coordinates: 39°14′46″N 41°58′56″E
- Country: Turkey
- Province: Erzurum
- District: Karaçoban
- Population (2022): 195
- Time zone: UTC+3 (TRT)

Çatalgül is a neighbourhood in the municipality and district of Karaçoban, Erzurum Province in Turkey. Its population is 195 (2022).
