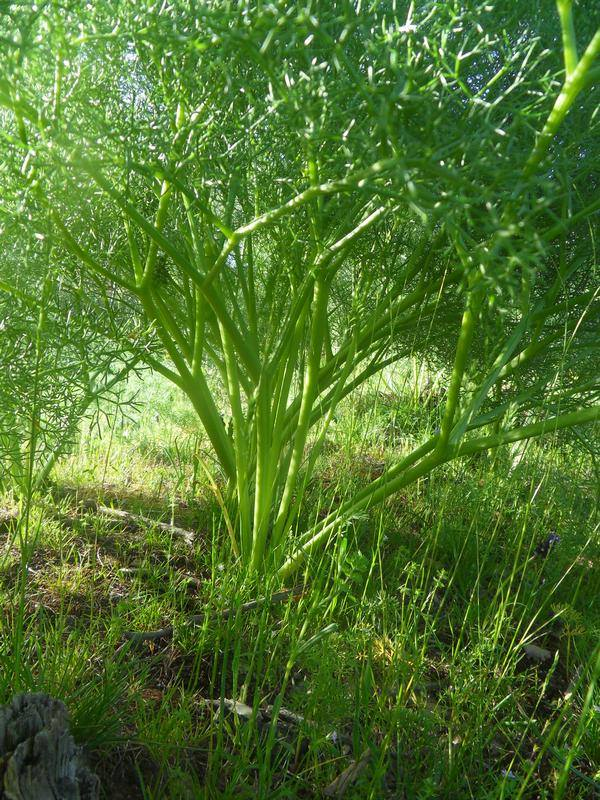

Scientific classification
- Kingdom: Plantae
- Clade: Tracheophytes
- Clade: Angiosperms
- Clade: Eudicots
- Clade: Asterids
- Order: Apiales
- Family: Apiaceae
- Genus: Prangos
- Species: P. ferulacea

Binomial name
- Prangos ferulacea (L.) Lindl.

Synonyms
- Cachrys alata Caruel; Cachrys goniocarpa Boiss., Diagn. ser. l(10):53 (1849); Cachrys prangoides Boiss. in Ann. Sci. Nat. ser. 3, 2:76 (1844); Laserpitium ferulaceum L., Sp. Pl. ed. 2:358 (1762); Prangos carinata Gris. ex Degcn in Term.-Tud. Közl. 28:44 (1896).; Cachrys ferulacea (L.) Calest.

= Prangos ferulacea =

Species of plant

Prangos ferulacea, known in Italy as common basilisk (basilisco comune), is a perennial herbaceous plant present in the Mediterranean Basin, Bulgarian Black Sea Coast, and the Caucasus.

== Description ==
Herbaceous plant 60–150 cm tall, stem has a diameter of 1-2 cm at the base. Its leaves are glabrous and light green, broadly ovate to ovate-triangular or oblong-elliptic and repeatedly pinnate. Its basal leaves have up to 50-80 cm long petioles, at the base they are divided into 3 lobes, each 4-5 times pinnate. Its terminal lobes are linear, lanceolate or almost filiform, with 1 vein, at the apex they are shortly pointed. The lower stem leaves are shorter-stalked and the uppermost are sessile, much smaller and less dissected, with sheaths enclosing the stem. The complex umbels are about 15 cm in diameter, with 6-18 main rays, at the base with a sheath of linear-lanceolate and membranous leaves. Awns are about 1 cm wide. Its petals are about 1 mm long, obovate or elliptic. The fruits are 10-25 mm long, about 10 mm wide, ovoid to elliptical, slightly laterally flattened. Blooms in May-June and bears fruit in June - August. It is pollinated by insects and propagated by seeds.

== Distribution ==
The species is distributed in Italy and the island of Sicily, Romania, Bulgaria, the Caucasus, Turkey, Armenia and Iran. In Bulgaria, it is found along the Black Sea coast - Medni Rid and Maslen nos, as well as on Bakadzhitsite, up to about 300 m above sea level. It is an endangered species in Bulgaria, included in the Red Book of Bulgaria and in the Bulgarian Law on Biological Diversity. In northern Sicily it grows on limestone in association with endangered fungus Pleurotus nebrodensis.
