= Akçamelik, Hınıs =

Village in Turkey

Akçamelik
- Neighbourhood
- Location in Turkey
- Coordinates: 39°16′23″N 41°54′02″E
- Country: Turkey
- Province: Erzurum
- District: Hınıs
- Population (2022): 166
- Time zone: UTC+3 (TRT)

Akçamelik is a neighbourhood in the municipality and district of Hınıs, Erzurum Province in Turkey. Its population is 166 (2022).
