= Alagöz, Hınıs =

Village in Turkey

Alagöz
- Neighbourhood
- Location in Turkey
- Coordinates: 39°20′49″N 41°37′42″E
- Country: Turkey
- Province: Erzurum
- District: Hınıs
- Population (2022): 310
- Time zone: UTC+3 (TRT)

Alagöz is a neighbourhood in the municipality and district of Hınıs, Erzurum Province in Turkey. Its population is 310 (2022).
