= Erenler, Karaçoban =

Village in Turkey

Erenler
- Neighbourhood
- Location in Turkey
- Coordinates: 39°27′35″N 42°05′18″E
- Country: Turkey
- Province: Erzurum
- District: Karaçoban
- Population (2022): 805
- Time zone: UTC+3 (TRT)

Erenler is a neighbourhood in the municipality and district of Karaçoban, Erzurum Province in Turkey. Its population is 805 (2022).
