= Acarköy, Hınıs =

Village in Turkey

Coordinates: 39°23′54″N 41°37′1″E

Acarköy
- Neighbourhood
- Location in Turkey
- Coordinates
- Country: Turkey
- Province: Erzurum
- District: Hınıs
- Population (2022): 119
- Time zone: UTC+3 (TRT)

Acarköy is a neighbourhood in the municipality and district of Hınıs, Erzurum Province in Turkey. Its population is 119 (2022).
