= Kazanci =

Kazanci may refer to:

- Kazanci, Bosnia and Herzegovina, a village near Gacko
- Kazanci, Nikšić, a village in Nikšić Municipality, Montenegro
- Kazancı (disambiguation), villages in Turkey
