= Akbayır, Hınıs =

Village in Turkey

Akbayır
- Neighbourhood
- Location in Turkey
- Coordinates: 39°28′25″N 41°46′3″E
- Country: Turkey
- Province: Erzurum
- District: Hınıs
- Population (2022): 91
- Time zone: UTC+3 (TRT)

Akbayır is a neighbourhood in the municipality and district of Hınıs, Erzurum Province in Turkey. Its population is 91 (2022).
