= Dervişali, Hınıs =

Village in Turkey

Dervişali
- Neighbourhood
- Location in Turkey
- Coordinates: 39°28′N 41°38′E
- Country: Turkey
- Province: Erzurum
- District: Hınıs
- Population (2022): 37
- Time zone: UTC+3 (TRT)

Dervişali is a neighbourhood in the municipality and district of Hınıs, Erzurum Province in Turkey. Its population is 37 (2022).
