= Doğanbey, Karaçoban =

Village in Turkey

Doğanbey
- Neighbourhood
- Location in Turkey
- Coordinates: 39°18′12″N 42°08′38″E
- Country: Turkey
- Province: Erzurum
- District: Karaçoban
- Population (2022): 260
- Time zone: UTC+3 (TRT)

Doğanbey is a neighbourhood in the municipality and district of Karaçoban, Erzurum Province in Turkey. Its population is 260 (2022).
