= Elbeyli, Hınıs =

Village in Turkey

Elbeyli
- Neighbourhood
- Country: Turkey
- Province: Erzurum
- District: Hınıs
- Population (2022): 99
- Time zone: UTC+3 (TRT)

Elbeyli is a neighbourhood in the municipality and district of Hınıs, Erzurum Province in Turkey. Its population is 99 (2022).
