= Karabudak, Hınıs =

Neighborhood in Turkey

Karabudak
- Neighbourhood
- Location in Turkey
- Coordinates: 39.363°N 41.843°E
- Country: Turkey
- Province: Erzurum
- District: Hınıs
- Population (2022): 36
- Time zone: UTC+3 (TRT)

Karabudak is a neighbourhood in the municipality and district of Hınıs, Erzurum Province in Turkey. Its population is 36 (2022). It is 170 km from Erzurum city center and 18 km from Hınıs.

== Population ==
Historical population
Year	Pop.	±% p.a.
1997	68	—
2007	70	+0.29%
2012	34	−13.45%
2017	37	+1.71%
2022	36	−0.55%
Source: 1997 census and TÜIK (2007-2022)
