= Alikırı, Hınıs =

Village in Turkey

Alikırı
- Neighbourhood
- Location in Turkey
- Coordinates: 39°16′16″N 41°36′23″E
- Country: Turkey
- Province: Erzurum
- District: Hınıs
- Population (2022): 28
- Time zone: UTC+3 (TRT)

Alikırı is a neighbourhood in the municipality and district of Hınıs, Erzurum Province in Turkey. Its population is 28 (2022).
