= Bellitaş, Hınıs =

Village in Turkey

Bellitaş
- Neighbourhood
- Location in Turkey
- Coordinates: 39.308911°N 41.840118°E
- Country: Turkey
- Province: Erzurum
- District: Hınıs
- Population (2022): 883
- Time zone: UTC+3 (TRT)

Bellitaş is a neighbourhood in the municipality and district of Hınıs, Erzurum Province in Turkey. Its population is 883 (2022).

It was an Armenian-populated village Haremik/Հարեմիկ until 1915, one of the most notable villages in Khnus.

According to tradition, Adam and Eve lived in the place of Haremik, and not far from the village, on the top of a hill called Seli Moruk, Adam's son Abel rests. According to another tradition, the hill south of the village is Cain's Hill, where he was struck by the arrow of the hunter Ghamek.
