= Ovaçevirme, Hınıs =

Village in Turkey

Ovaçevirme
- Neighbourhood
- Location in Turkey
- Coordinates: 39°20′N 41°48′E
- Country: Turkey
- Province: Erzurum
- District: Hınıs
- Population (2022): 252
- Time zone: UTC+3 (TRT)

Ovaçevirme is a neighbourhood in the municipality and district of Hınıs, Erzurum Province in Turkey. Its population is 252 (2022).
