= Sıldız, Hınıs =

Village in Turkey

Sıldız
- Neighbourhood
- Location in Turkey
- Coordinates: 39°29′13″N 41°37′31″E
- Country: Turkey
- Province: Erzurum
- District: Hınıs
- Population (2022): 102
- Time zone: UTC+3 (TRT)

Sıldız is a neighbourhood in the municipality and district of Hınıs, Erzurum Province in Turkey. Its population is 102 (2022).
