= Erduran, Hınıs =

Village in Turkey

Erduran
- Neighbourhood
- Location in Turkey
- Coordinates: 39°32′31″N 41°41′13″E
- Country: Turkey
- Province: Erzurum
- District: Hınıs
- Population (2022): 32
- Time zone: UTC+3 (TRT)

Erduran is a neighbourhood in the municipality and district of Hınıs, Erzurum Province in Turkey. Its population is 32 (2022).
