= Karamolla, Hınıs =

Village in Turkey

Karamolla
- Neighbourhood
- Location in Turkey
- Coordinates: 39°20′N 41°37′E
- Country: Turkey
- Province: Erzurum
- District: Hınıs
- Population (2022): 13
- Time zone: UTC+3 (TRT)

Karamolla is a neighbourhood in the municipality and district of Hınıs, Erzurum Province in Turkey. Its population is 13 (2022).
