= Dikili, Hınıs =

Village in Turkey

Dikili
- Neighbourhood
- Location within Turkey
- Country: Turkey
- Province: Erzurum
- District: Hınıs
- Population (2025): 83
- Time zone: UTC+3 (TRT)

Dikili is a neighbourhood in the municipality and district of Hınıs, Erzurum Province in Turkey. Its population is 83 (2025).
