= Binpınar, Karaçoban =

Village in Turkey

Binpınar
- Neighbourhood
- Location in Turkey
- Coordinates: 39°21′45″N 42°02′57″E
- Country: Turkey
- Province: Erzurum
- District: Karaçoban
- Population (2022): 1,626
- Time zone: UTC+3 (TRT)

Binpınar is a neighbourhood in the municipality and district of Karaçoban, Erzurum Province in Turkey. Its population is 1,626 (2022).
