= Derince, Hınıs =

Village in Turkey

Derince
- Neighbourhood
- Location in Turkey
- Coordinates: 39.313889°N 41.646389°E
- Country: Turkey
- Province: Erzurum
- District: Hınıs
- Population (2022): 70
- Time zone: UTC+3 (TRT)

Derince is a neighbourhood in the municipality and district of Hınıs, Erzurum Province in Turkey. Its population is 70 (2022).
