= Ertan Uyanık =

Turkish-Austrian futsal player

Ertan Uyanık (born 1979) is a Turkish-Austrian futsal player. He currently plays for Stella Rossa Vienna, and previously played amateur and professional level for SV Wienerberg, Afyonspor, Gersthofer SV, Sierndorf SV, Etsan Vienna Türkgücü SKV.

He is a member of the Turkey national futsal team in the UEFA Futsal Championship.
