= Paeonia turcica =

Scientific classification
- Kingdom: Plantae
- Clade: Tracheophytes
- Clade: Angiosperms
- Clade: Eudicots
- Order: Saxifragales
- Family: Paeoniaceae
- Genus: Paeonia
- Species: P. turcica

Binomial name
- Paeonia turcica David & Cullen

Species of flowering plant

Paeonia turcica, the Turkish peony, is a flowering plant in the family Paeoniaceae. It is also called the "bear rose" in Turkey. It is native to the mountainous regions of south-western Turkey, particularly in Caria and Lycia. This rare perennial herb grows to about 60 centimetres tall and produces striking magenta-rose flowers with golden centres, typically blooming earlier than other peony species. It grows at elevations between 1500 and 1820 metres in pine forests and open shrubby areas on limestone formations. First scientifically described in 1965, this endemic Turkish species has demonstrated excellent cold hardiness in cultivation, surviving temperatures as low as -7 °C without damage, making it a valued ornamental plant despite its limited distribution in the wild where it faces potential conservation challenges due to collection for export.

== Description ==
Paeonia turcica is a herbaceous perennial plant that grows to roughly 60 cm in height with smooth, hairless stems that have a slightly bluish-grey coating. The leaves are compound, arranged in groups of 5–6, with the lower leaves having 9–11 leaflets. These leaflets are elliptical or oval-elliptical in shape, measuring 9–14 cm long and 5–7 cm wide. The terminal leaflet (at the end of the leaf stem) has its own stalk, while the side leaflets are often stalkless. The leaf stems and main veins of the leaf blade typically display a reddish-purple colouration on their upper surface, while the underside appears slightly bluish-grey, sometimes with small white hairs.

The flowers are a bold magenta-rose colour, with broad, oblong sepals (the outer parts that protect the flower bud) and obovate petals (wider at the tip than at the base) measuring 3.5–4 cm long. The flowers feature a central mass of golden stamens (pollen-producing structures) encircled by crimson-tipped, white-woolly carpels (female reproductive parts). The plant typically produces 2–5 smooth, seed-containing structures called carpels, each 4–5 cm long and 1.5–1.8 cm wide. These develop a distinctive stigma (pollen-receiving structure) that measures 0.2 cm long, with a slight upward curve along its length and a wavy margin.

After the petals have fallen, the plant remains attractive with its elegant foliage and glossy black seeds held within open, crimson-lined fruits. The chromosome number for this species is 2n=20, indicating it is a tetraploid (having four sets of chromosomes).

Paeonia turcica shares similarities with P. kesrouanensis from Lebanon and the Amanos region but can be distinguished by its shorter stigma style that curves near the base rather than forming a coiled structure. Another distinctive feature of P. turcica is that its leaflets have small hairs on the underside, while its carpels are smooth and hairless.

Paeonia turcica was first documented flowering in cultivation in 1996 at the Royal Botanic Gardens, Kew, where it demonstrated considerable hardiness, surviving temperatures as low as -7 °C without damage. The species typically flowers earlier than other peonies grown outdoors at Kew, making it a valuable garden plant for its beauty, relative ease of cultivation, and early flowering characteristics.

== Habitat and distribution ==
Paeonia turcica is endemic to Turkey, with a relatively limited distribution primarily concentrated in the south-western regions of the country. It naturally occurs in the ancient regions of Caria and Lycia, which correspond to parts of modern-day south-western Turkey.

The species is found growing at elevations between 1500–1820 metres above sea level, particularly in mountainous areas such as the Bey Dağlari (Bey mountain range) near Elmalı. It grows in open, shrubby conditions on limestone formations, particularly in the Yeni Tabiat Forest. The plant's natural habitat consists primarily of Pinus brutia (Turkish pine) and Pinus nigra (black pine) forests, where it can be found both within forest margins and in more open situations.

While taxonomically related to other peony species found in Turkey, P. turcica has a more restricted range compared to some of its relatives. Distribution maps indicate that it is mainly found in the southern regions of Turkey, particularly in the south-west. Unlike the more widespread Paeonia mascula subspecies, which occur across much of Turkey including the north-western areas around Mount Ida and Çanakkale, as well as central-north Anatolia, P. turcica is considered a local endemic.

Conservation assessments suggest the species may fall into the "Rare" category, indicating its limited distribution and potentially vulnerable status. The wild populations are known to be collected for export under trade names that sometimes misidentify the species, which could pose conservation challenges for this distinctive Turkish endemic.

== Taxonomy ==
Paeonia turcica was first formally described by the botanists Peter Hadland Davis and James Cullen in 1965, as published in Notes from the Royal Botanic Garden Edinburgh. The type specimen was collected from Boz Dağ, above Abbas in Denizli Province, Turkey, where it was found growing in Pinus brutia forests at an elevation of 1500–1800 metres on 16 July 1941.

Paeonia turcica belongs to the section Paeonia. It is part of a group of eight distinct taxa that represent the genus in Turkey, alongside species and subspecies such as P. mascula (with several subspecies), P. peregrina, P. tenuifolia, P. kesrouanensis, and P. wittmanniana.
