= Diplotaenia =

Scientific classification
- Kingdom: Plantae
- Clade: Tracheophytes
- Clade: Angiosperms
- Clade: Eudicots
- Clade: Asterids
- Order: Apiales
- Family: Apiaceae
- Subfamily: Apioideae
- Genus: Diplotaenia; Boiss.

Genus of plants

Diplotaenia is a genus of flowering plants belonging to the family Apiaceae.

Its native range is Eastern Turkey to Iran. There are many in the Akdoğan Mountains in Muş province.

Species:

- Diplotaenia bingolensis M.Öztürk, A.Duran & Behçet
- Diplotaenia cachrydifolia Boiss.
- Diplotaenia damavandica Mozaff., Hedge & Lamond
- Diplotaenia hayri-dumanii Pimenov & Kljuykov
- Diplotaenia turcica Pimenov & Kljuykov
