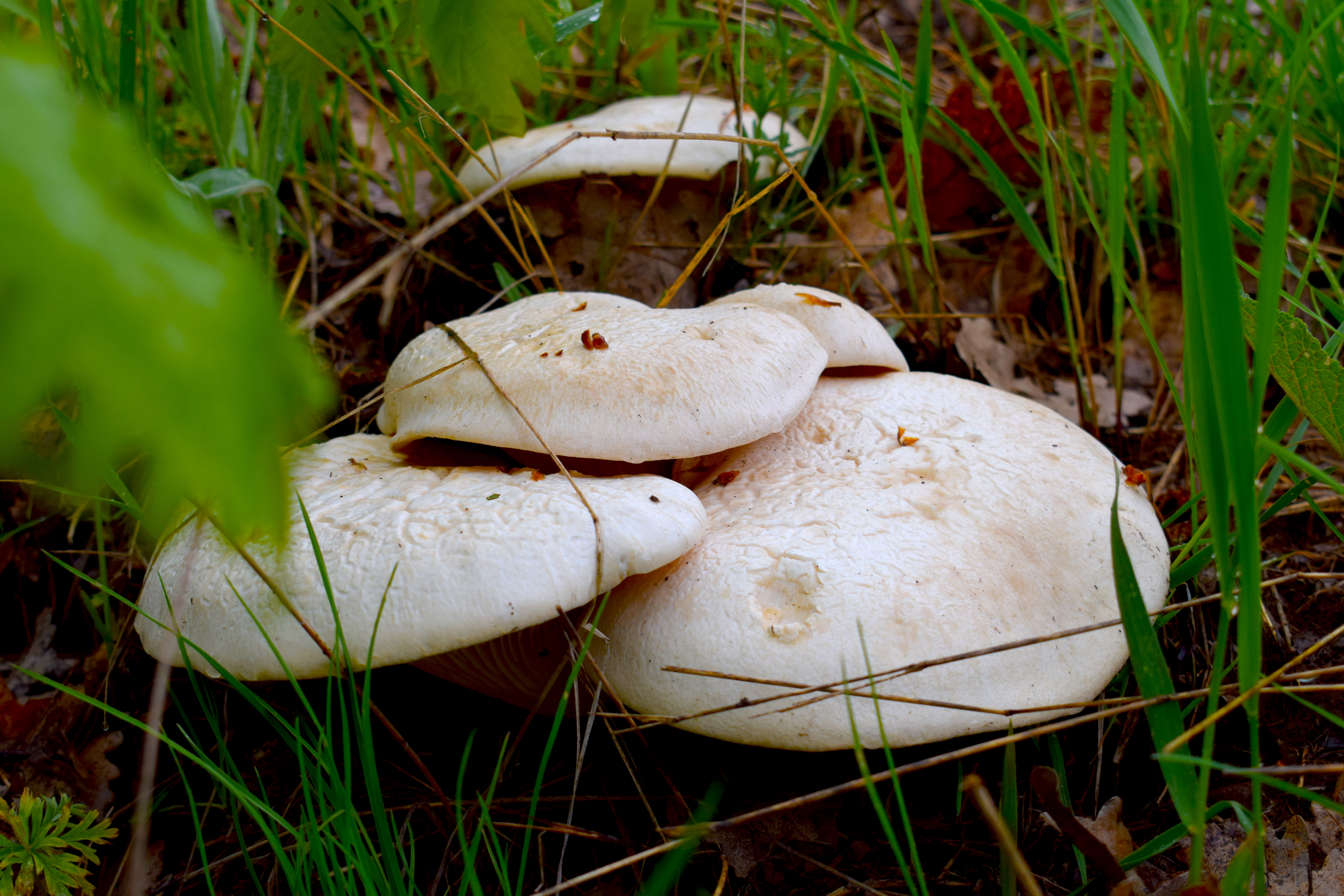

Scientific classification
- Kingdom: Fungi
- Division: Basidiomycota
- Class: Agaricomycetes
- Order: Agaricales
- Family: Pleurotaceae
- Genus: Pleurotus
- Species: P. eryngii
- Variety: P. e. var. ferulae

Trinomial name
- Pleurotus eryngii var. ferulae (Lanzi) Sacc

= Pleurotus eryngii var. ferulae =

Species of fungus

Pleurotus eryngii var. ferulae (Lanzi) Sacc
- Mycological characteristics
- Gills on hymenium
- Cap is depressed or offset
- Hymenium is decurrent
- Stipe is bare
- Spore print is white to brown
- Ecology is saprotrophic or parasitic
- Edibility is edible

Pleurotus eryngii var. ferulae (commonly known as Ferula mushroom) is a subspecies of the king trumpet mushroom (Pleurotus eryngii) that usually grows in the dried roots of the poisonous Ferula plant in the east of Turkey, northwest of Iran and Sardinia.

== Description ==
After 1 year after the poisonous Ferula plant rots in the soil, edible white fungus occurs at the root of the plant. It grows in mountains at high altitudes such as 1000 and 2500 meters in the spring in the Eastern Anatolia region. Unlike other fungi, this type of fungus reflects the sun's rays and facilitates remote detection of its location. This mushroom is rich in protein and mineral elements and is weak in fat content.
