= Kepenek Castle =

Massive stone fortification in Turkey

- Kepenek village, Muş, Turkey

Site information
- Type: Fortress
- Open to the public: Yes

Location
- Coordinates: 38°43′04″N 41°32′54″E

The Kepenek Castle (Turkish: Kepenek Kalesi) is a historical Urartian castle on the mountain slope in the central district of Muş, Turkey.

== History ==
Kepenek Castle is 3–4 km from the city centre. This structure, located in the southeast, is located in the area between Donatım and Kepenek. This architectural structure, extending in the shape of a cape towards the east, is 25 m from the road. As high as 1392 m. It is located on a hill with altitude.

An inscription belonging to Urartian King Argisti I (785-765 BC) was unearthed near Kepenek Castle. The inscription is now under protection by the Muş Provincial Directorate of Culture and Tourism. The inscription in question reads:

To Master Haldi, Argisti, son of Minua, this silence He built his temple and a castle perfectly (and) took his name from Argistihinil put it. Thanks to the greatness of Haldi (I am) Minua son of Argisti, mighty king, great king, King of the Land of Bianili, lord of the City of Tuspa.
