= Muş =

Muş Մուշ
- Municipality
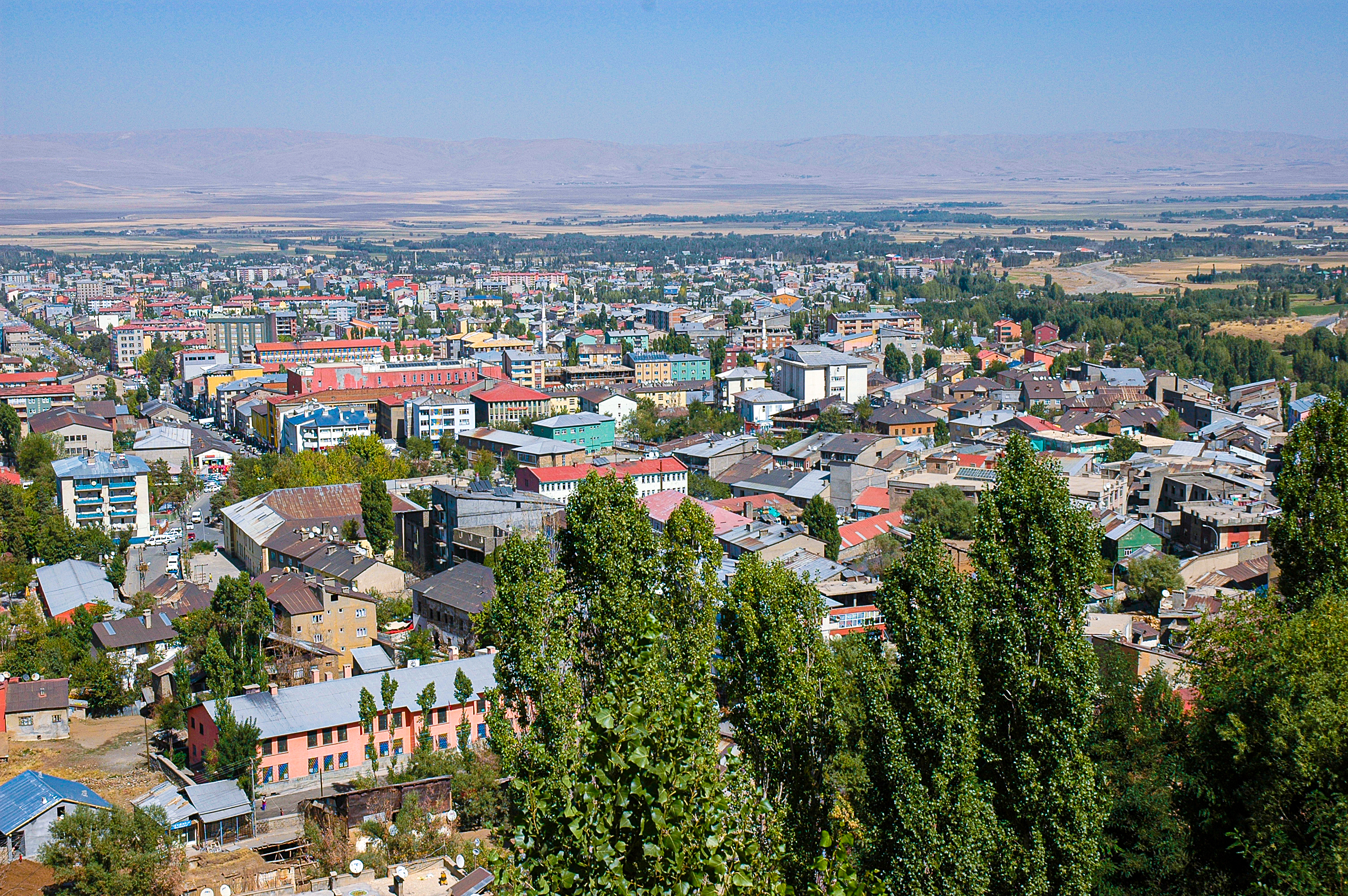
- A view of Muş city

- Coat of arms

- Location within Turkey
- Coordinates: 38°44′00″N 41°29′28″E
- Country: Turkey
- Province: Muş
- District: Muş

Government
  - Mayor: Sırrı Söylemez (DEM)
- Elevation: 1,350 m (4,430 ft)
- Population (2022): 120,699
- Time zone: UTC+3 (TRT)
- Postal code: 49000
- Area code: 0436
- Website: www.mus.bel.tr

Muş (pronounced [muʃ]; Armenian: Մուշ; Kurdish: Mûş) is a city in eastern Turkey and one of the principal cities of the predominantly Kurdish-inhabited region of eastern Anatolia. It is the seat of Muş Province and Muş District. Its population is 120,699 (2022). The city is majority Kurdish.

== Etymology ==
Various explanations of the origin of Muş's name exist. Its name is sometimes associated with the Armenian word mshush, meaning fog, explained by the fact that the town and the surrounding plain are frequently covered in fog in the mornings. The 17th-century explorer Evliya Çelebi relates a myth where a giant mouse created by Nemrud (Nimrod) destroys the city and its inhabitants, after which the city was named Muş (muš means "mouse" in Persian). Others have proposed a connection with the names of different ancient Anatolian peoples, the Mushki or the Mysians, or the toponyms Mushki and Mushuni mentioned in Assyrian and Hittite sources, respectively.

== History ==
=== Iron Age ===
==== Kingdom of Urartu ====
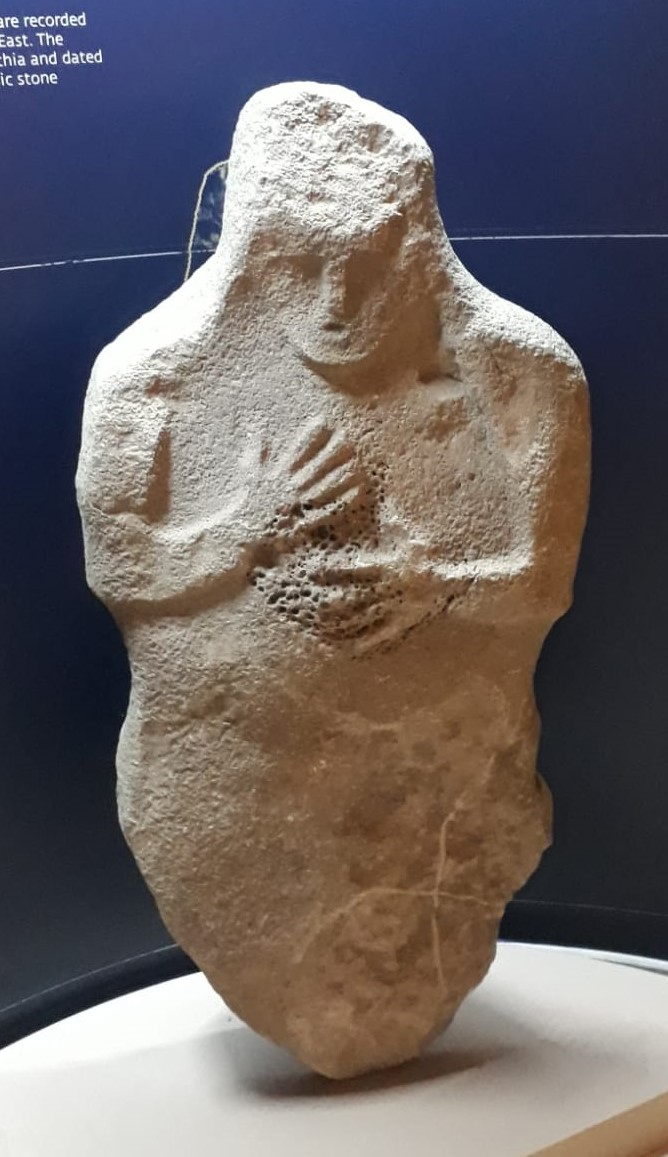
A Urartian Bulanık Stele, Bitlis Ahlat Museum

An inscription belonging to Urartian King Argisti I (785-765 BC) was unearthed near Kepenek Castle. The inscription is now under protection by the Muş Provincial Directorate of Culture and Tourism. The inscription in question reads:

To Master Haldi, Argisti, son of Minua, this silence He built his temple and a castle perfectly (and) took his name from Argistihinil put it. Thanks to the greatness of Haldi (I am) Minua son of Argisti, mighty king, great king, King of the Land of Bianili, lord of the City of Tuspa

The date of foundation of Mush is unknown, although a settlement is believed to have been around by the time of Menua, the king of Urartu (c. 800 BC), whose cuneiform inscription was found in the city's vicinity.

=== Medieval period ===
During the Middle Ages, Mush was the center of the Taron region of Armenia. It is first mentioned as a city in Armenian manuscripts of the 9th and 10th centuries. In the late 8th century, Mush, along with the Taron region, came under control of the Armenian Bagratid (Bagratuni) dynasty, who reconquered it from the Muslim Arabs. Mush and the Taron region were captured and annexed to the Byzantine Empire in 969. The region continued to face attacks from the Hamdanids, Uqaylids and Marwanids until the Byzantines were finally ousted from the region by the Seljuk Turks following the 1071 Battle of Manzikert. Following this battle, it came under the rule of the Ahlatshahs.

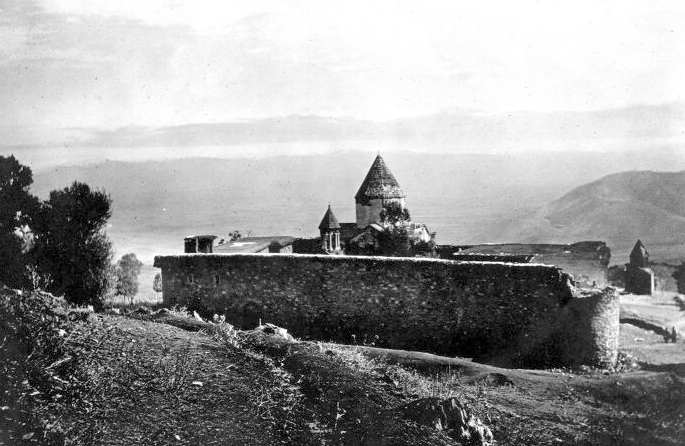
4th-century Arakelots Monastery before its destruction during the Armenian genocide

After the 11th century, the town was ruled by Islamic dynasties such as the Ahlatshahs, Ayyubids, Ilkhanids and Kara Koyunlu. In the 10th-13th centuries Mush developed into a major city with an estimated population of 20 to 25 thousand people. In 1387 the Central Asian conqueror Timur crossed the area and apparently captured Mush town without a battle. Later, the Akkoyunlu ruled the area until they were conquered by the Safavids. The Ottomans under Selim I took control over the town and region in the early 16th century from the Persian Safavids. Mush remained part of the Ottoman Empire till the early 20th century and during these times retained a large Armenian population. In 1821 a Persian invasion reached Mush.

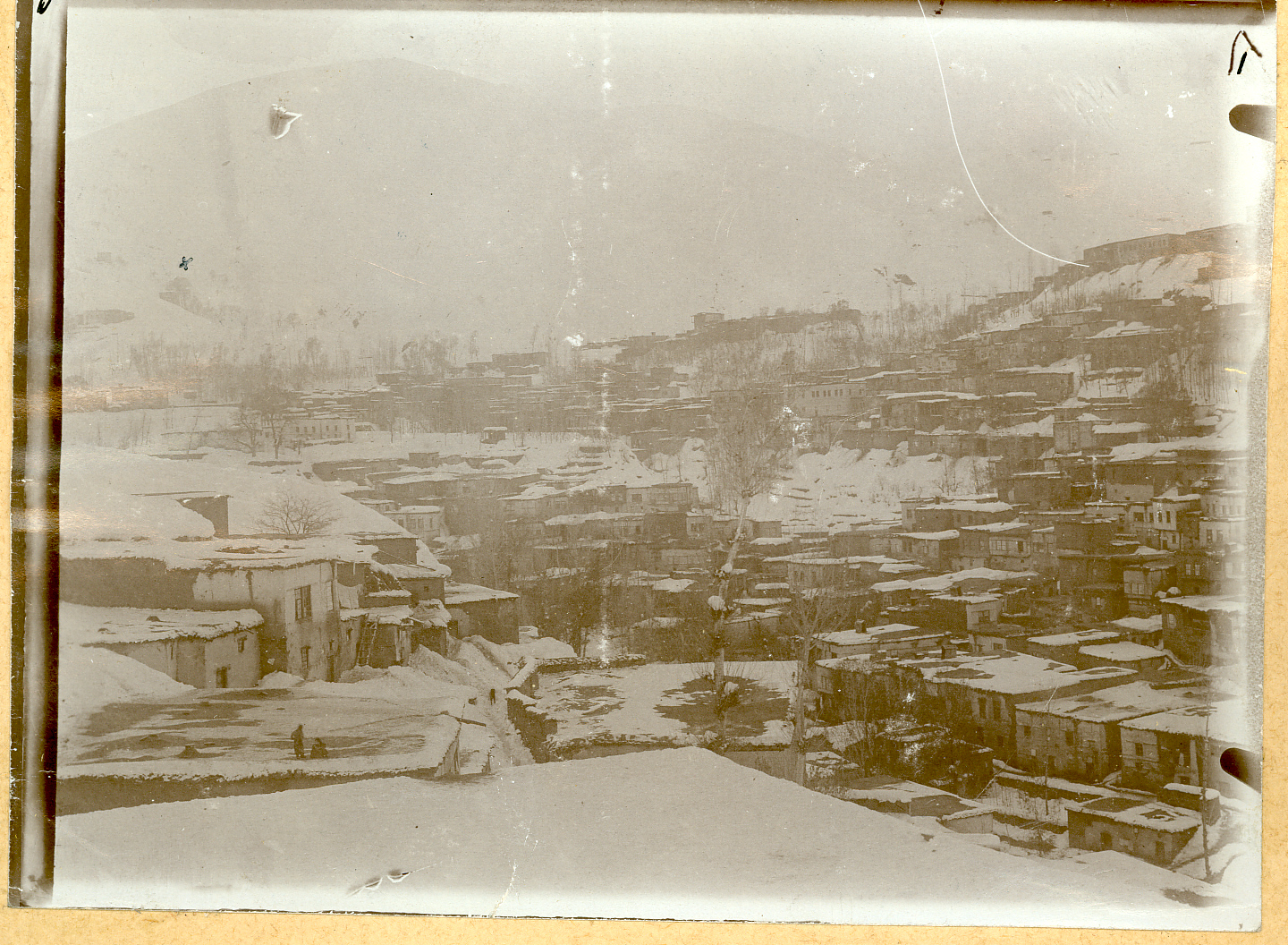
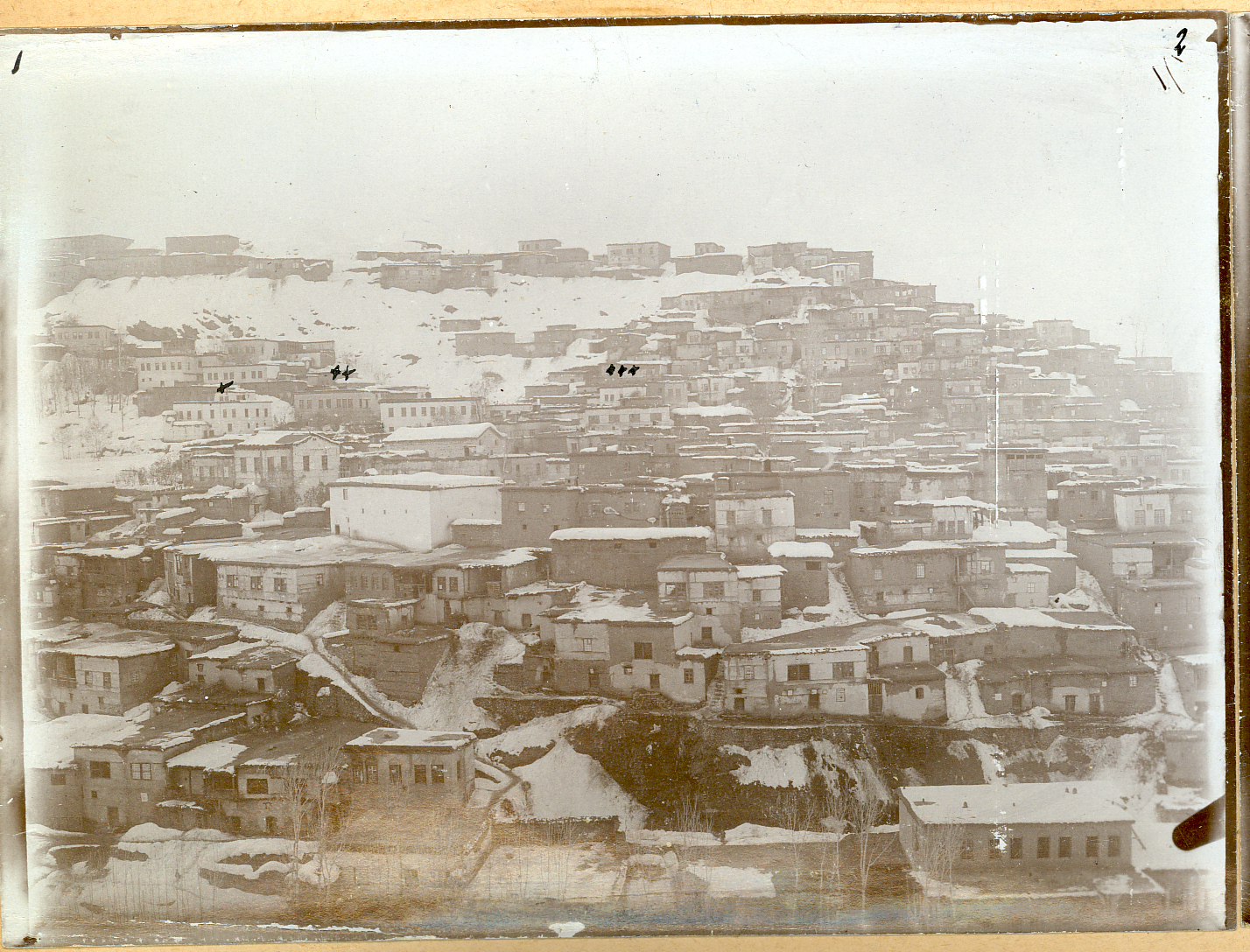
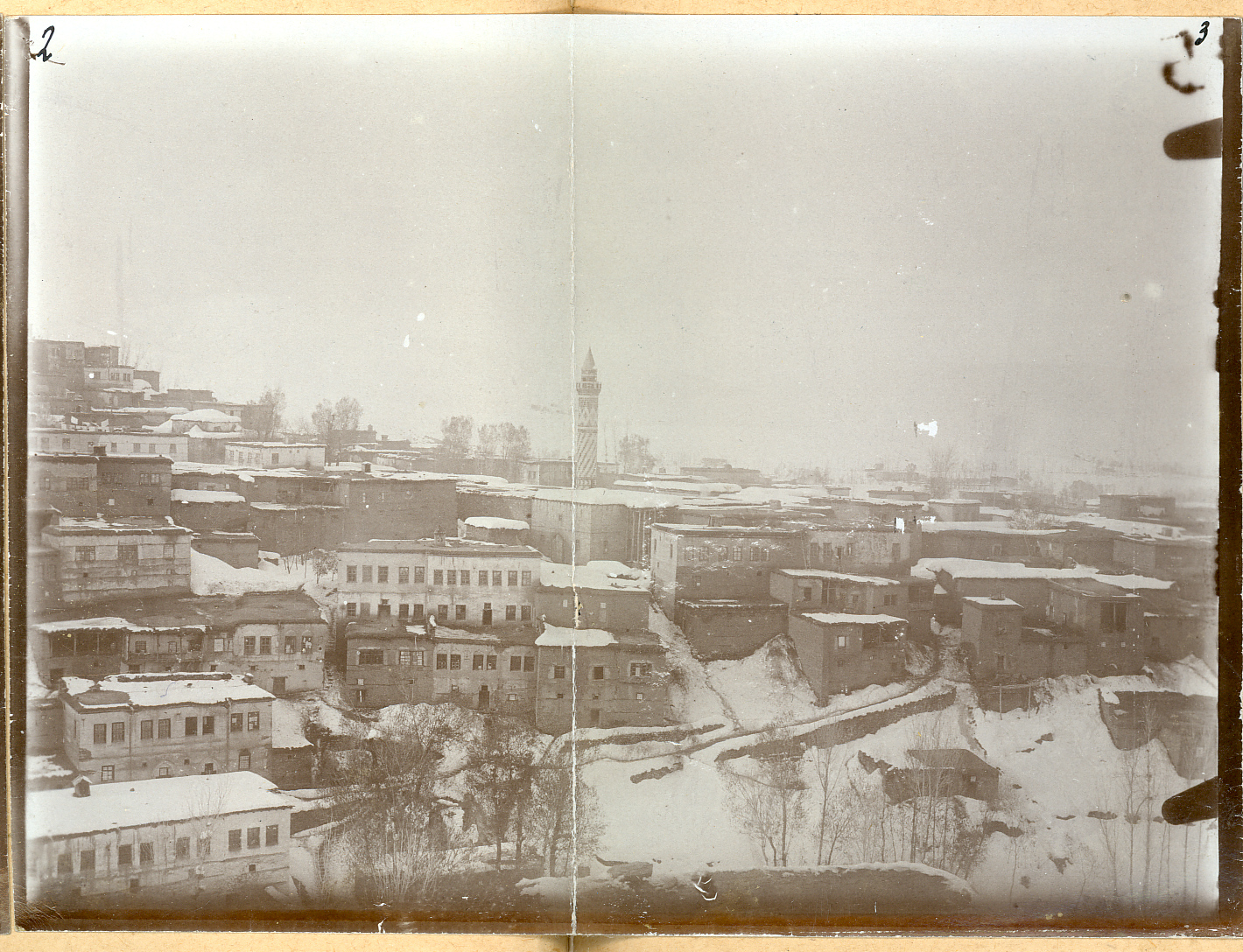
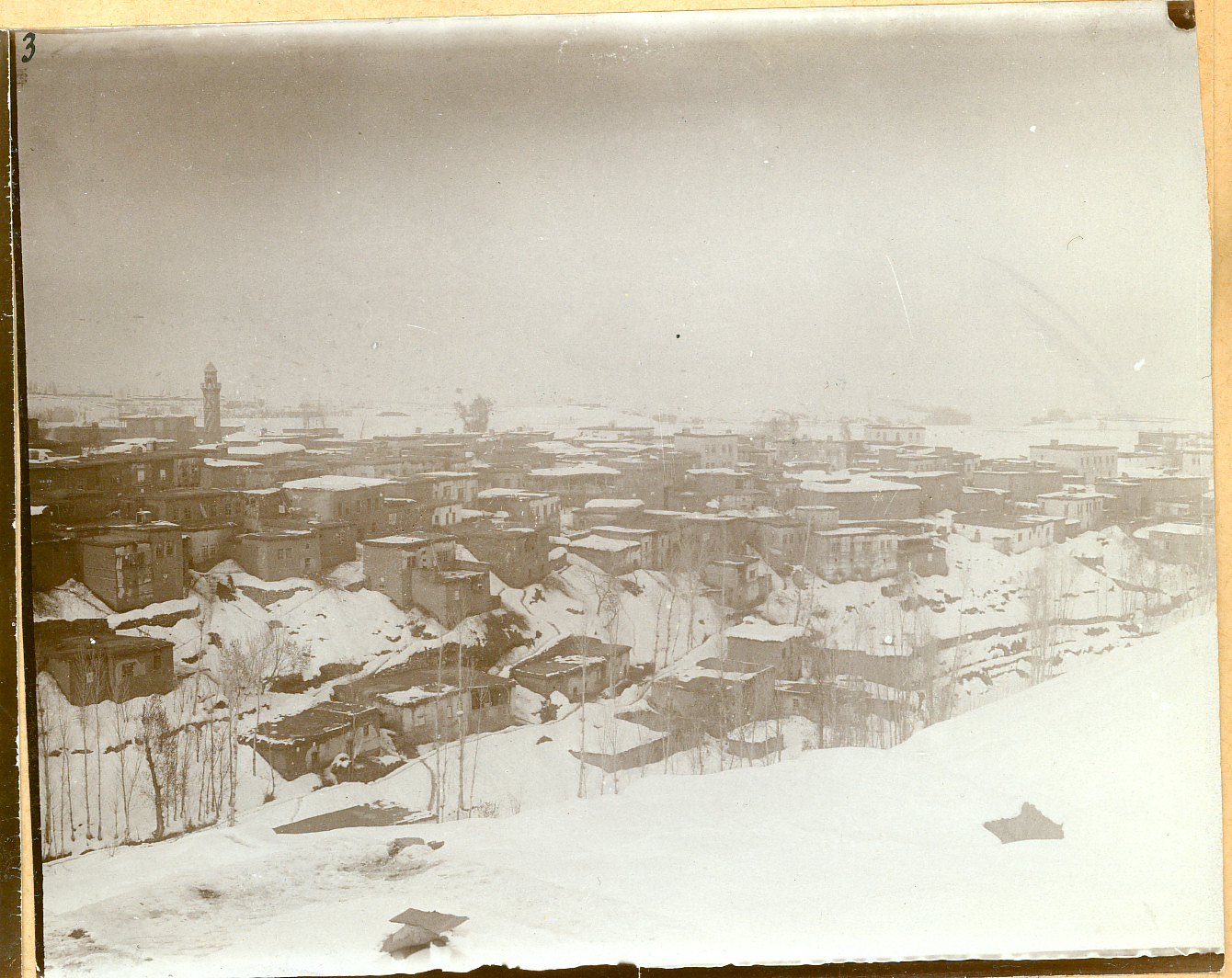
Panorama of the city of Muş, then in the Ottoman Empire, photographed by the Norwegian missionary Bodil Katharine Biørn in 1905 (from the collections of the National Archives of Norway)

=== Modern ===
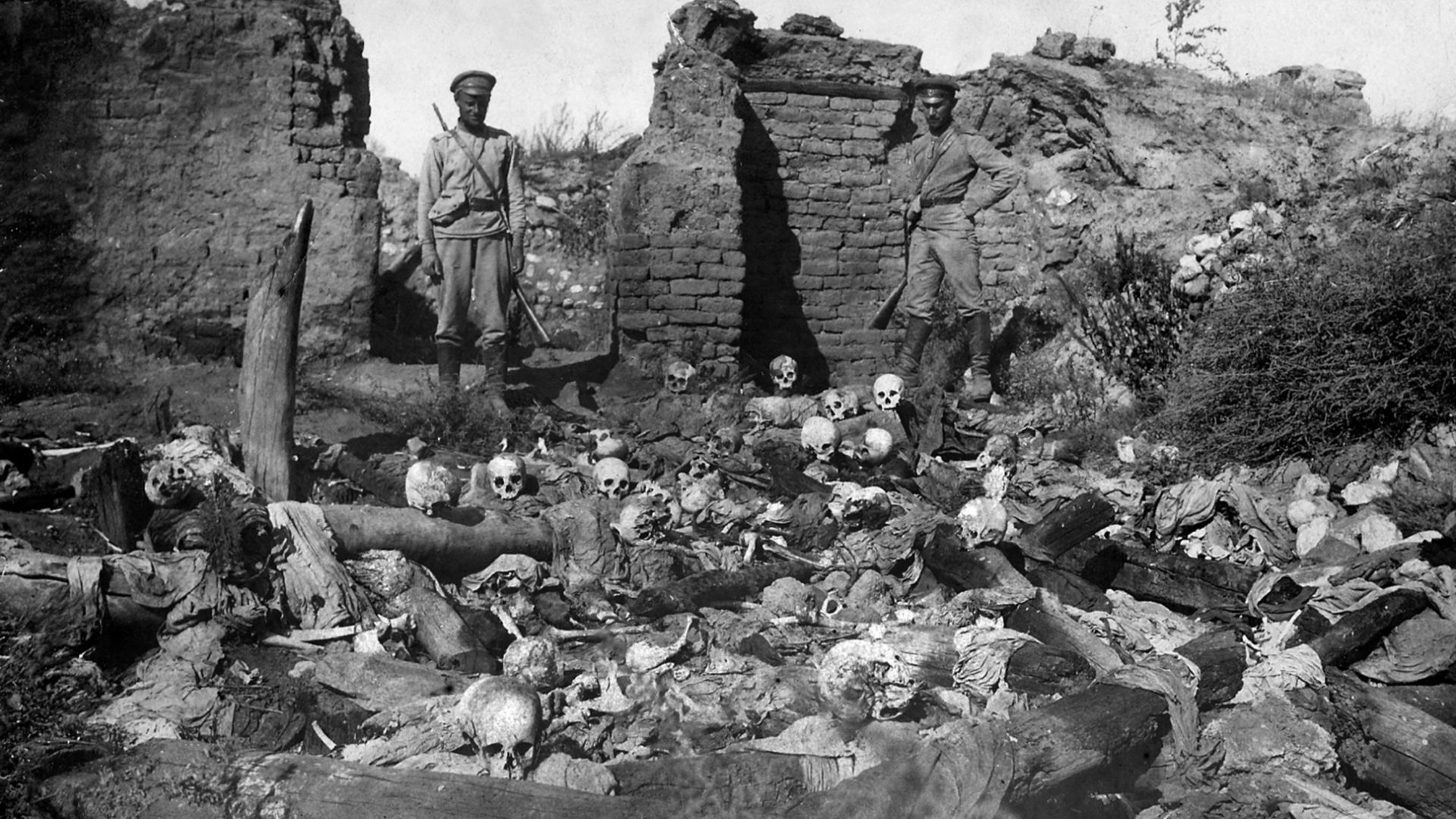
Russian soldiers uncover the evidence of a massacre in the former Armenian village of Sheykhalan, 1916

British traveller H. F. B. Lynch travelled to Muş at the end of the 19th century. He described the city as "the most mis-governed town in the Ottoman Empire".

At the turn of the twentieth century, the city had around 20,000 inhabitants, of which 11,000 were Muslims, while 9,000 were Christian Armenians. According to the Catholic Encyclopedia (1913) the town had 27,000 inhabitants, of whom 13,300 were Muslims and 13,700 Armenians. According to the Encyclopædia Britannica (1911) the population was nearly equally divided between Kurds and Armenians.

During the Armenian genocide of 1915 the indigenous Armenian population of the region was exterminated. Over 140,000 Armenians of the Mush sanjak (living in 234 villages and towns) were targeted in June and July 1915. Military-aged Armenian men were conscripted to serve in the Ottoman Army during World War I. The Armenian population was largely defenseless to these threats. The massacre of the Armenian population of the city of Mush came only after the surrounding villages were destroyed.

The town was captured by the forces of the Russian Empire in February 1916 during the World War I. It was recaptured by the Second Army under the command of Mustafa Kemal Pasha in 1917.

In the 1960s, the Arakelots Monastery was dynamited by Muş officials.

== Education ==
Alparslan University is one of the universities in Muş.

== Tourism and main sights ==
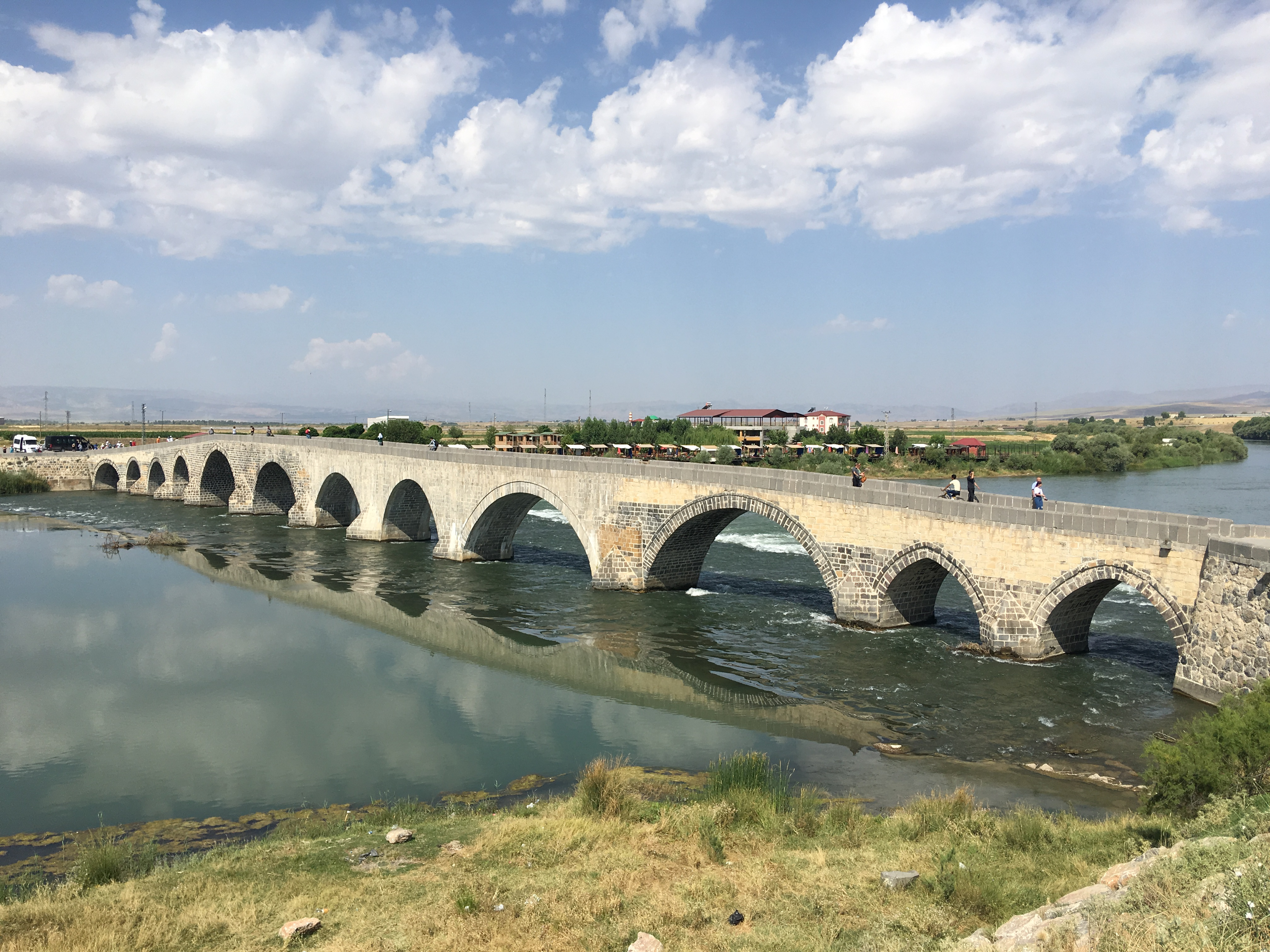
View of Murat Bridge

The touristic places in Muş are the historical Murat Bridge, the tulips on the Muş Plain, Muş Castle, Kepenek Castle, Haspet Castle, Mercimekkale Mound, Lake Akdoğan, Künav Cave, Lake Haçlı, Kayalıdere Castle and Malazgirt Castle. The area of Muş has several ruined castles. Under the rule of medieval Armenian dynasties, monasteries and churches were built in localities near Mush, such as the Arakelots Monastery, Surp Marineh Church, and Surb Karapet Monastery, most of which are now ruins.

Under the rule of Muslim dynasties, other types of buildings were built as well. There are mosques from the Ottoman and pre-Ottoman period which show influences of Seljuk architecture, such as the Alaeddin Bey (18th century), Haci Seref (17th century), and Ulu (14th century, previously an Armenian church) mosques. Other sights include caravanserais like the Yıldızlı Han (13th century) destroyed in 1916, the now almost completely ruined Aslanlı Han, the bathhouse and fountain of Alaeddin Bey, and tombs of Muslim saints.

== Transportation ==
The city is served by the Muş Airport. It has a train station and a bus station (MUŞTİ).

== Demographics ==
In the late 19th century, H. F. B. Lynch reports that the city of Muş had two large mosques with minarets, four Armenian Apostolic churches (Surb Marineh, Surb Kirakos, Surb Avetaranotz, and Surb Stepanos) and one Armenian Catholic church.

Before the Armenian genocide, Armenians formed the majority of the population in the kaza of Muş. According to the Armenian Patriarchate of Constantinople, on the eve of the First World War, there were 75,623 Armenians, with 113 churches, 74 monasteries, and 87 schools. They were all massacred during the Armenian genocide, many of them burned in their houses. Almost all Muslims were Kurds.

According to the 1927 Turkish census, the Muş District had 21,486 Muslims and 13 non-Muslims.

Mother tongue, Muş District, 1927 Turkish census
Turkish	Arabic	Kurdish	Circassian	Other
5,921	61	14,839	570	108

Population of the municipality of Muş numbers 120,699 according to a 2022 estimate. Kurds make up the majority of the population. The city also has a population of Arabs, and Hidden Armenians.

== Gallery ==
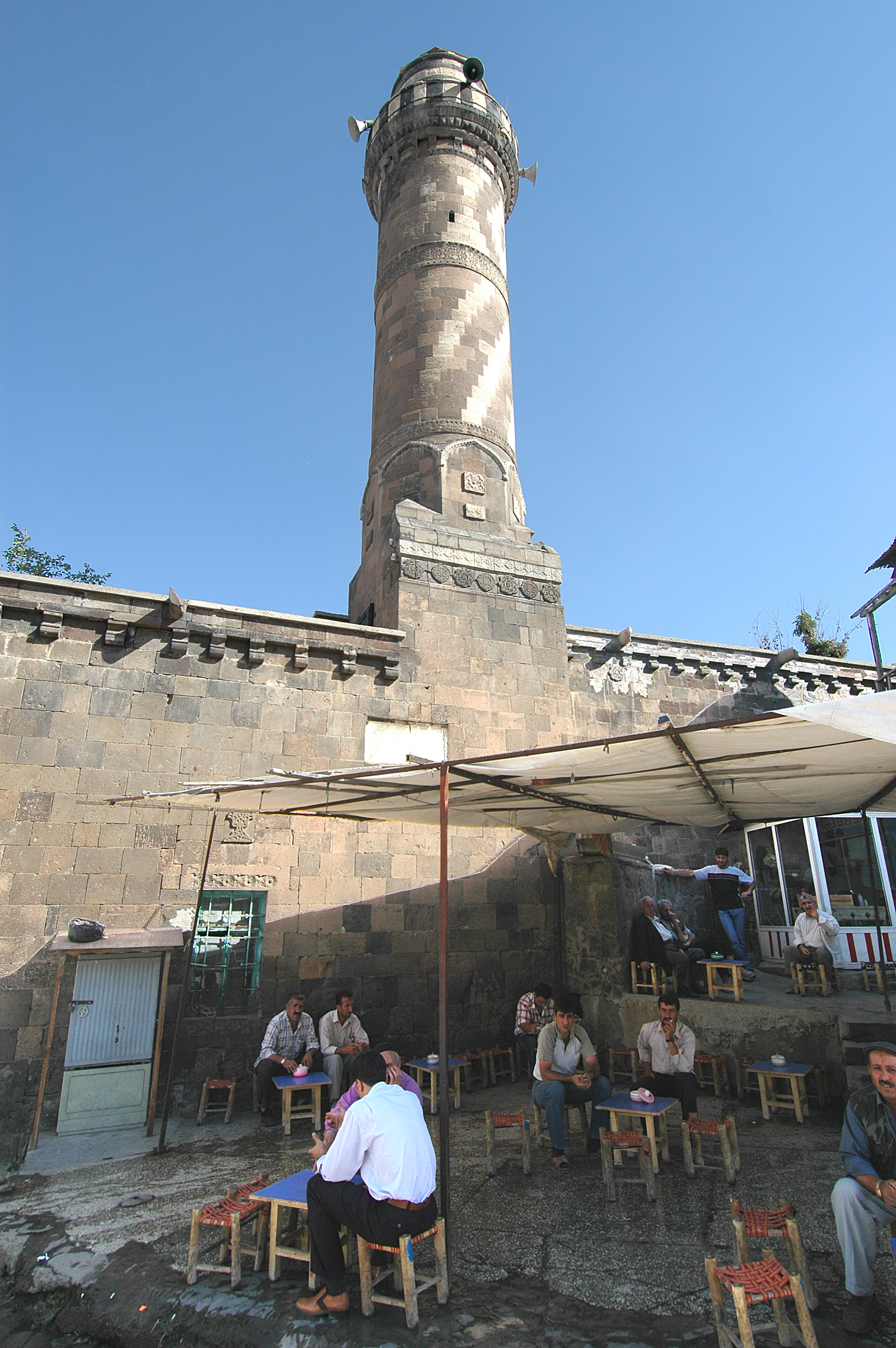
Muş Alaeddin Pasha Mosque

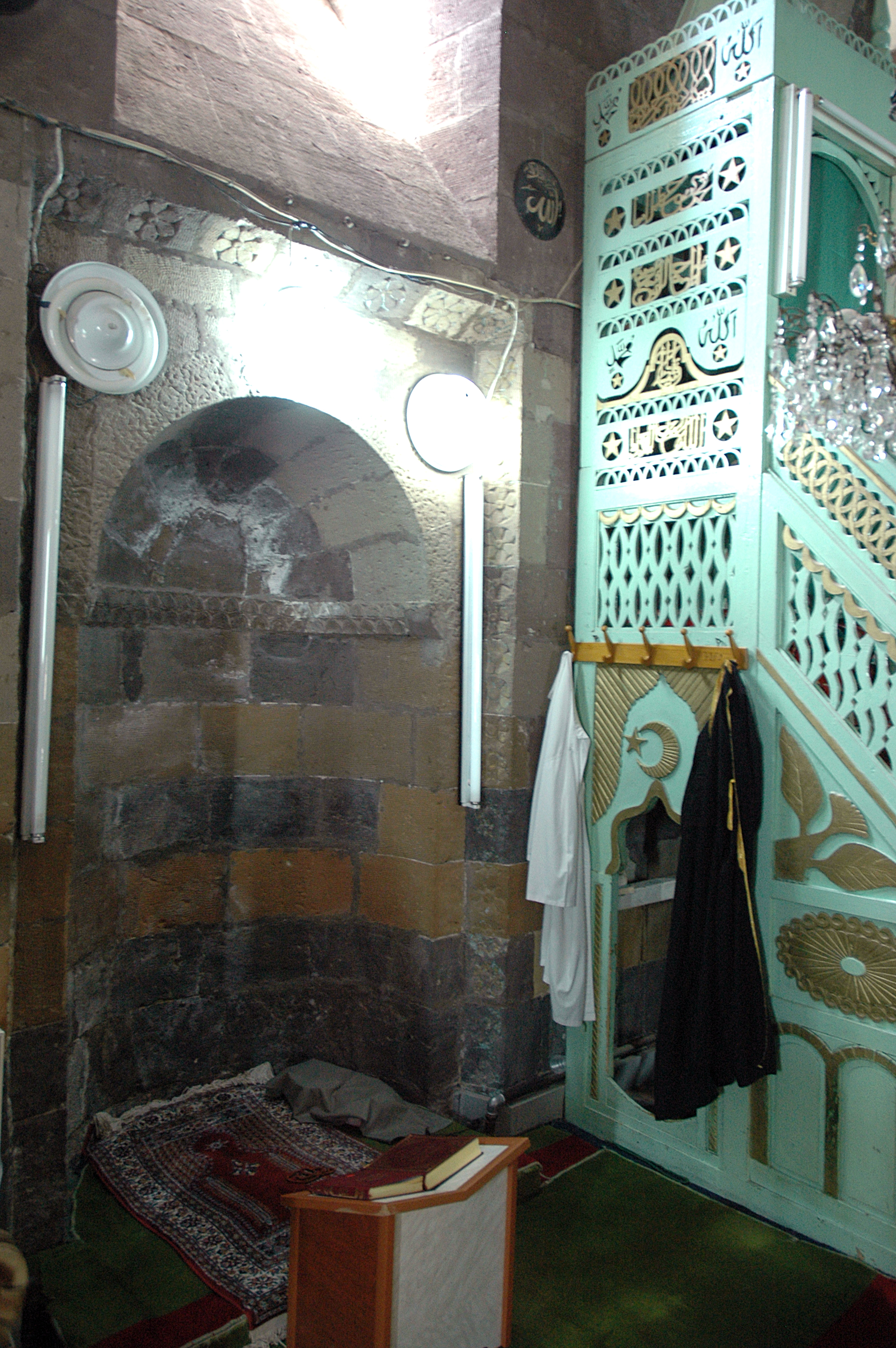
Muş Alaeddin Pasha Mosque

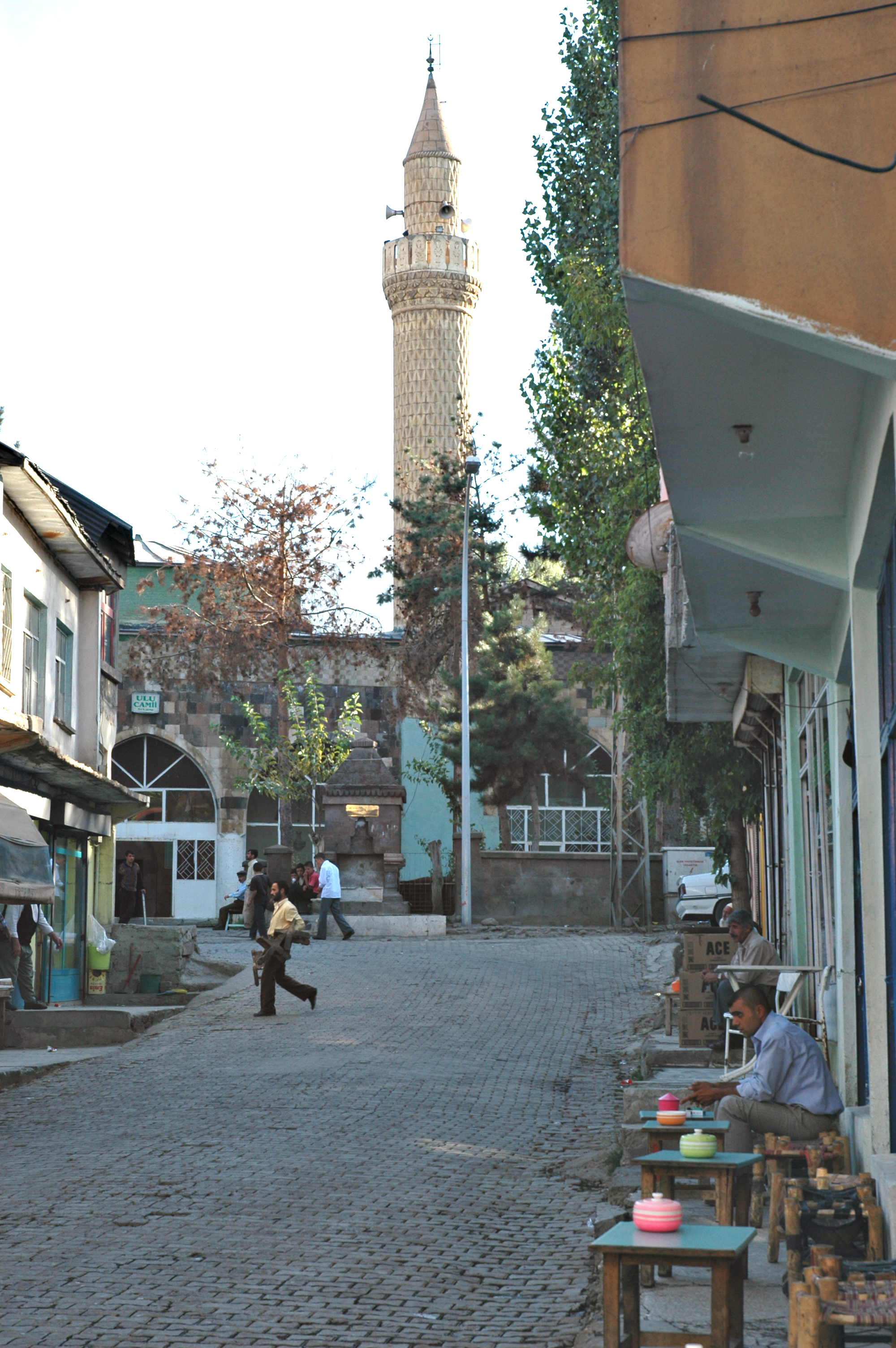
Muş Ulu Mosque

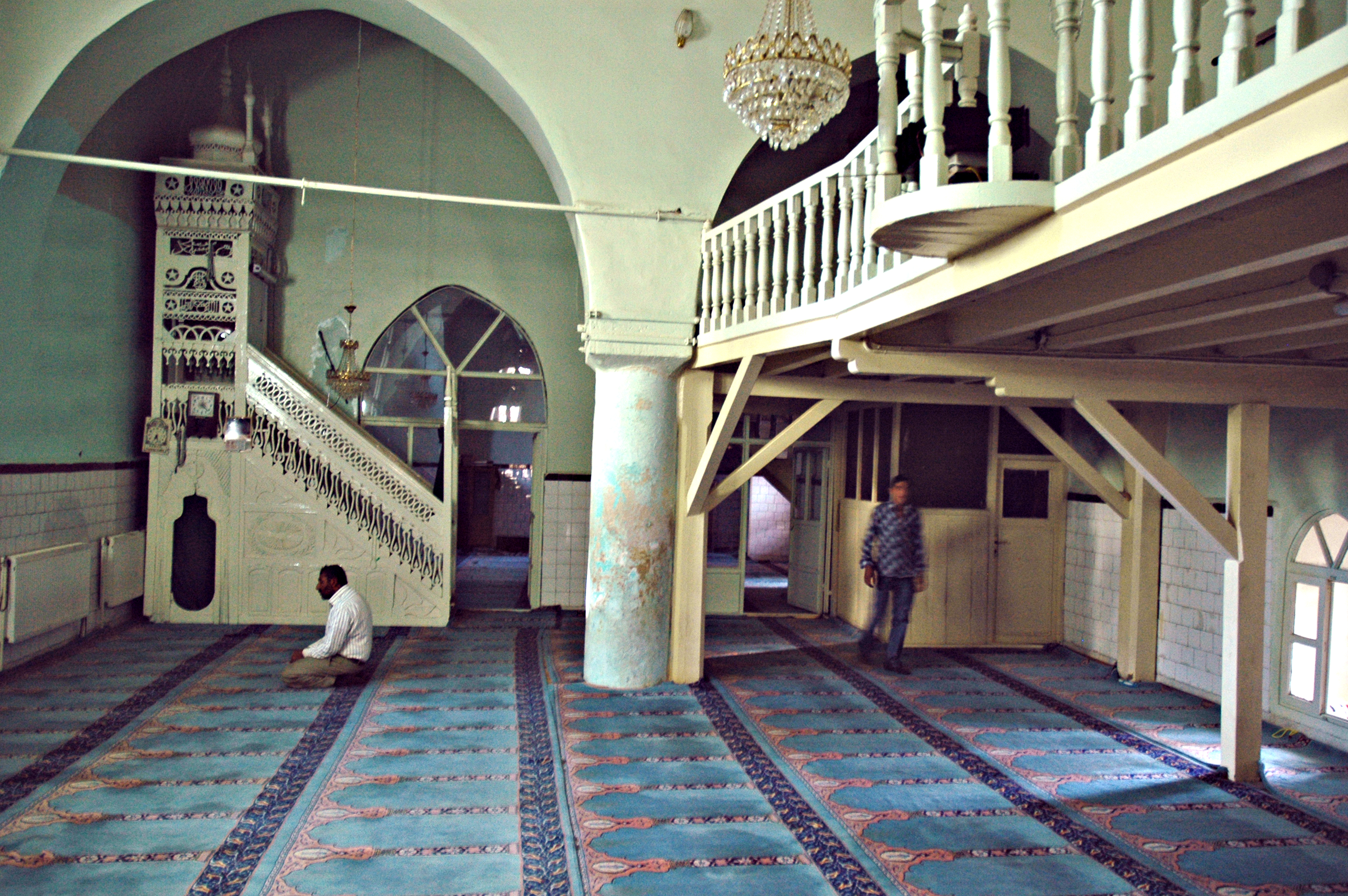
Muş Ulu Mosque

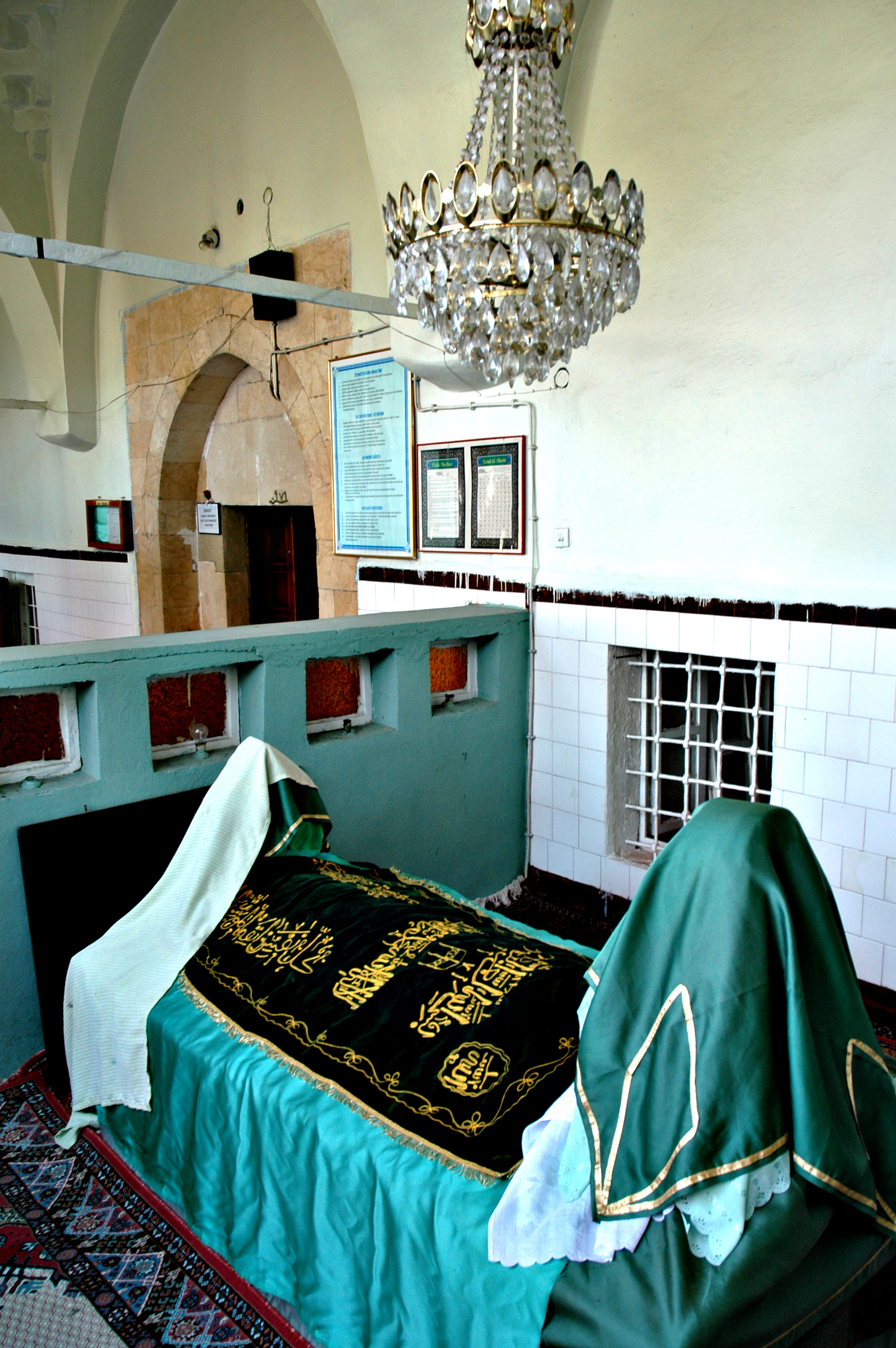
Muş Ulu Mosque

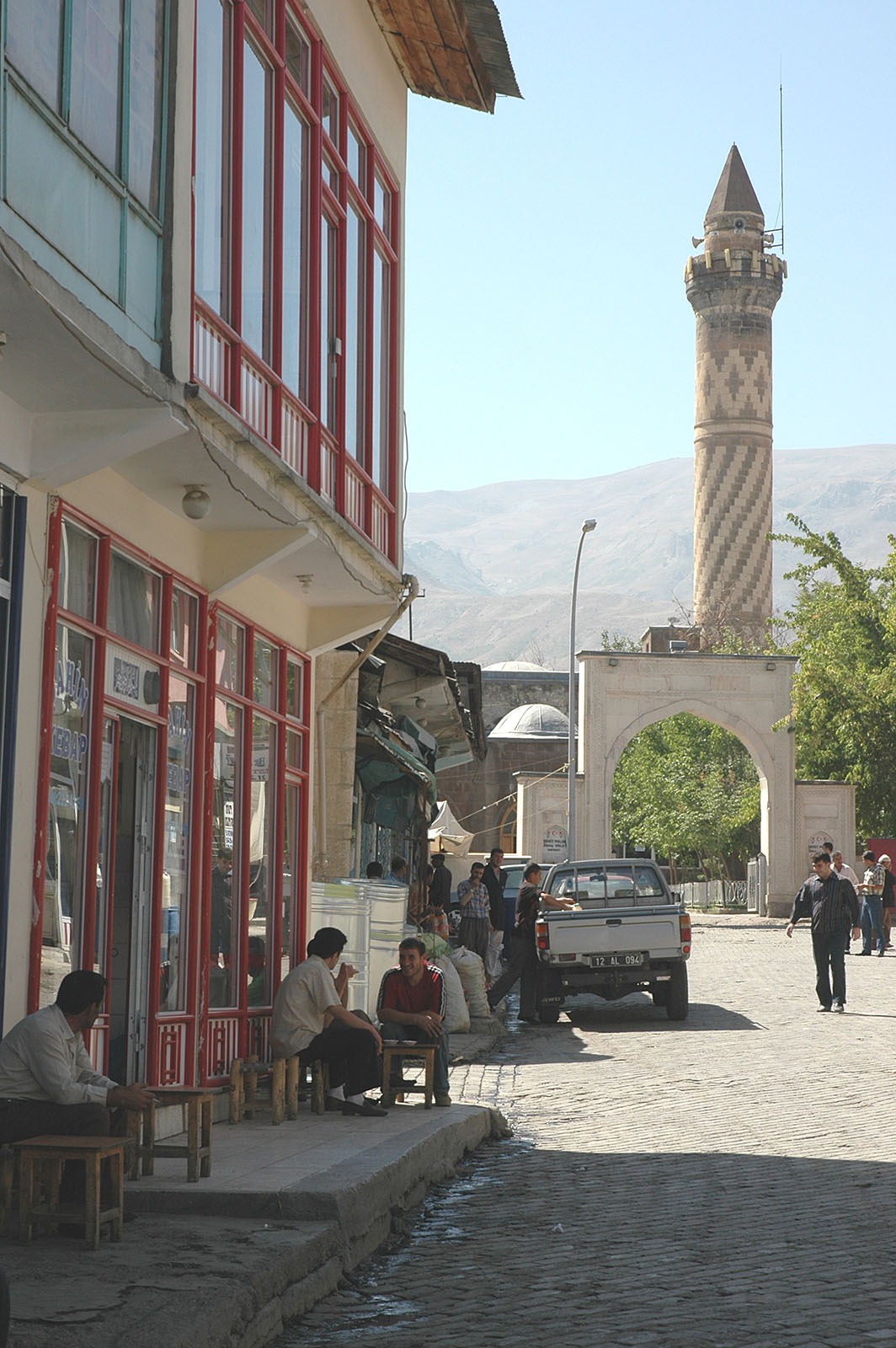
Muş Hacı Şeref Mosque

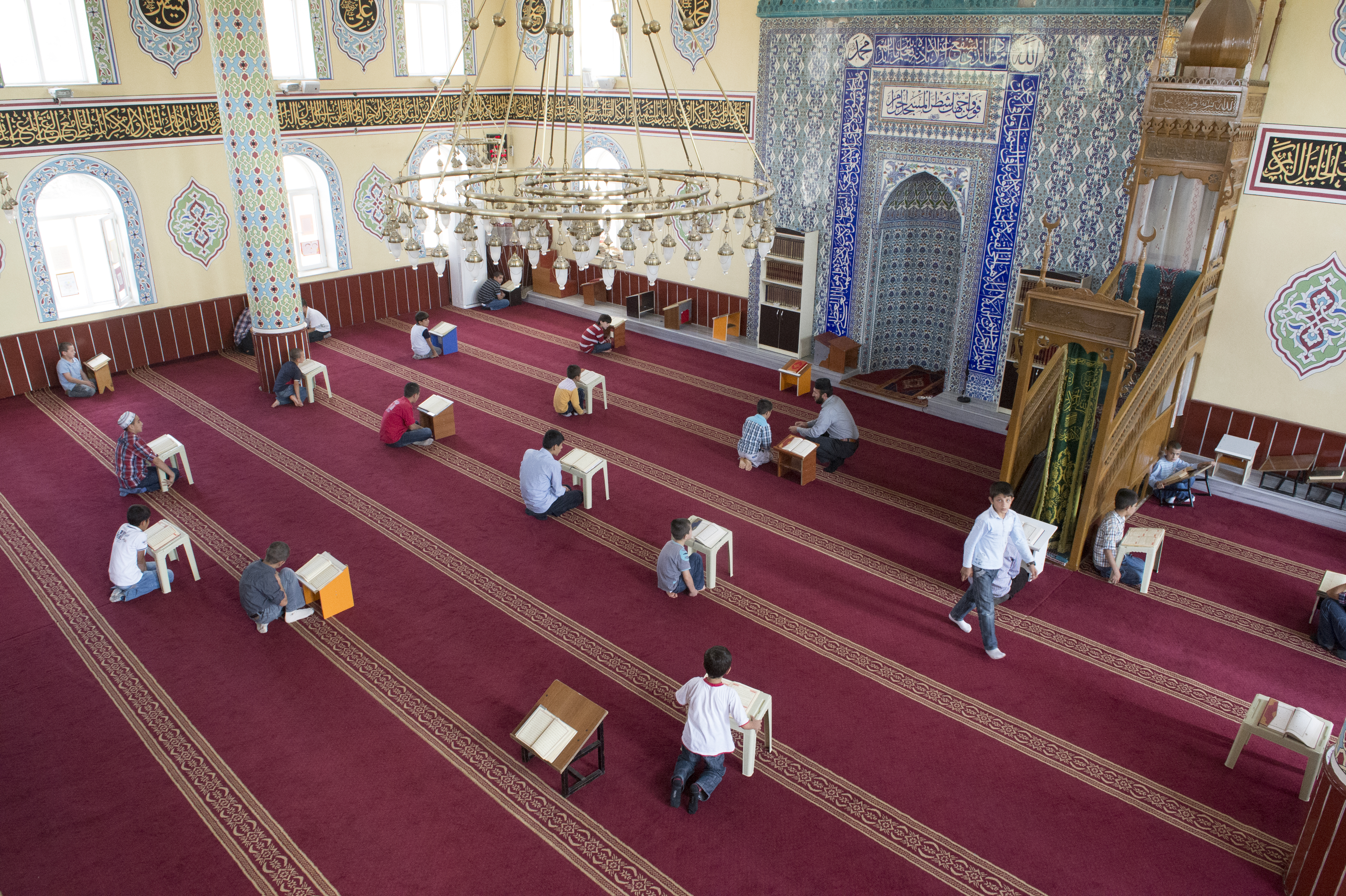
Muş Tuba Mosque

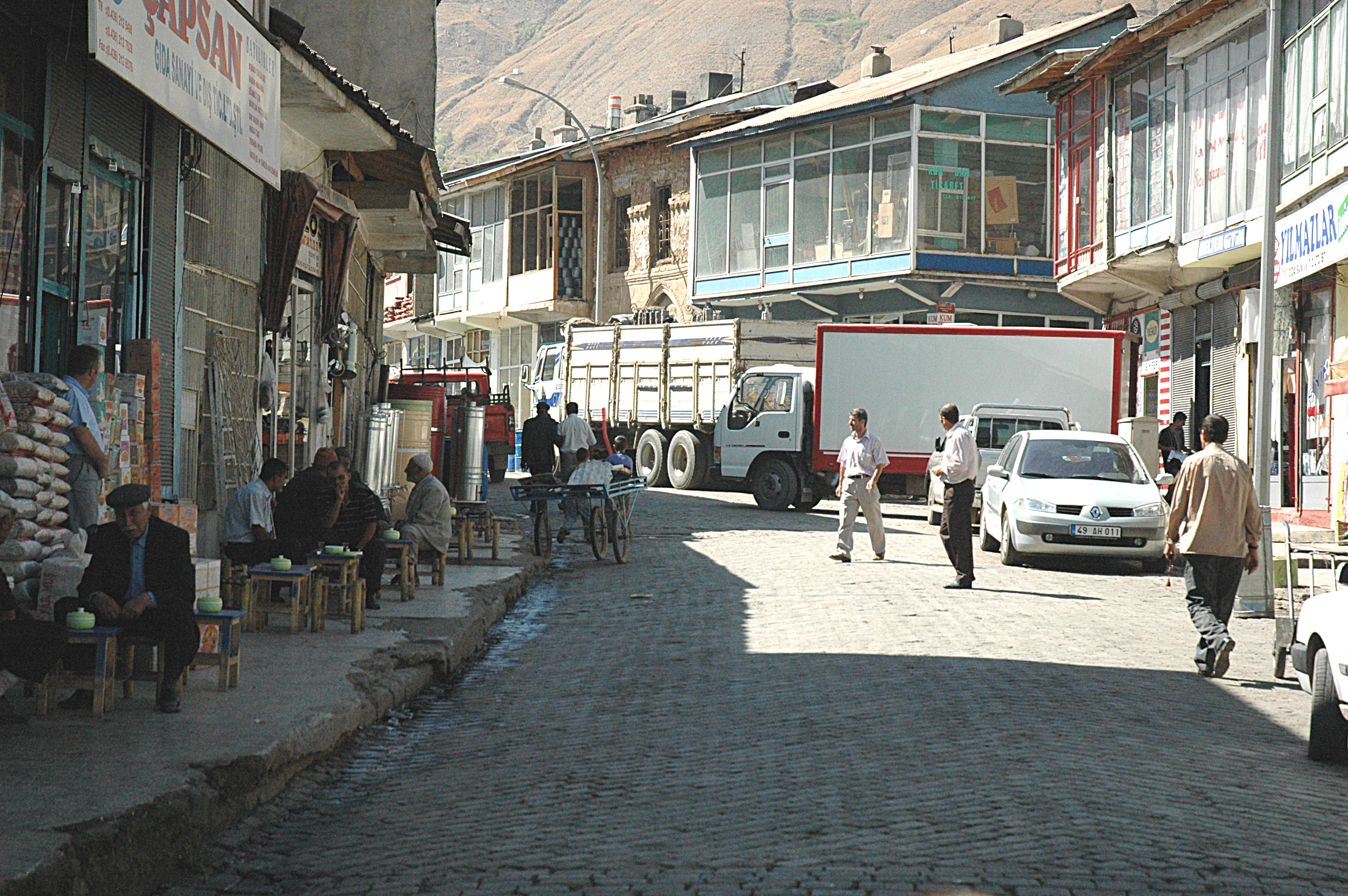
Muş street scene

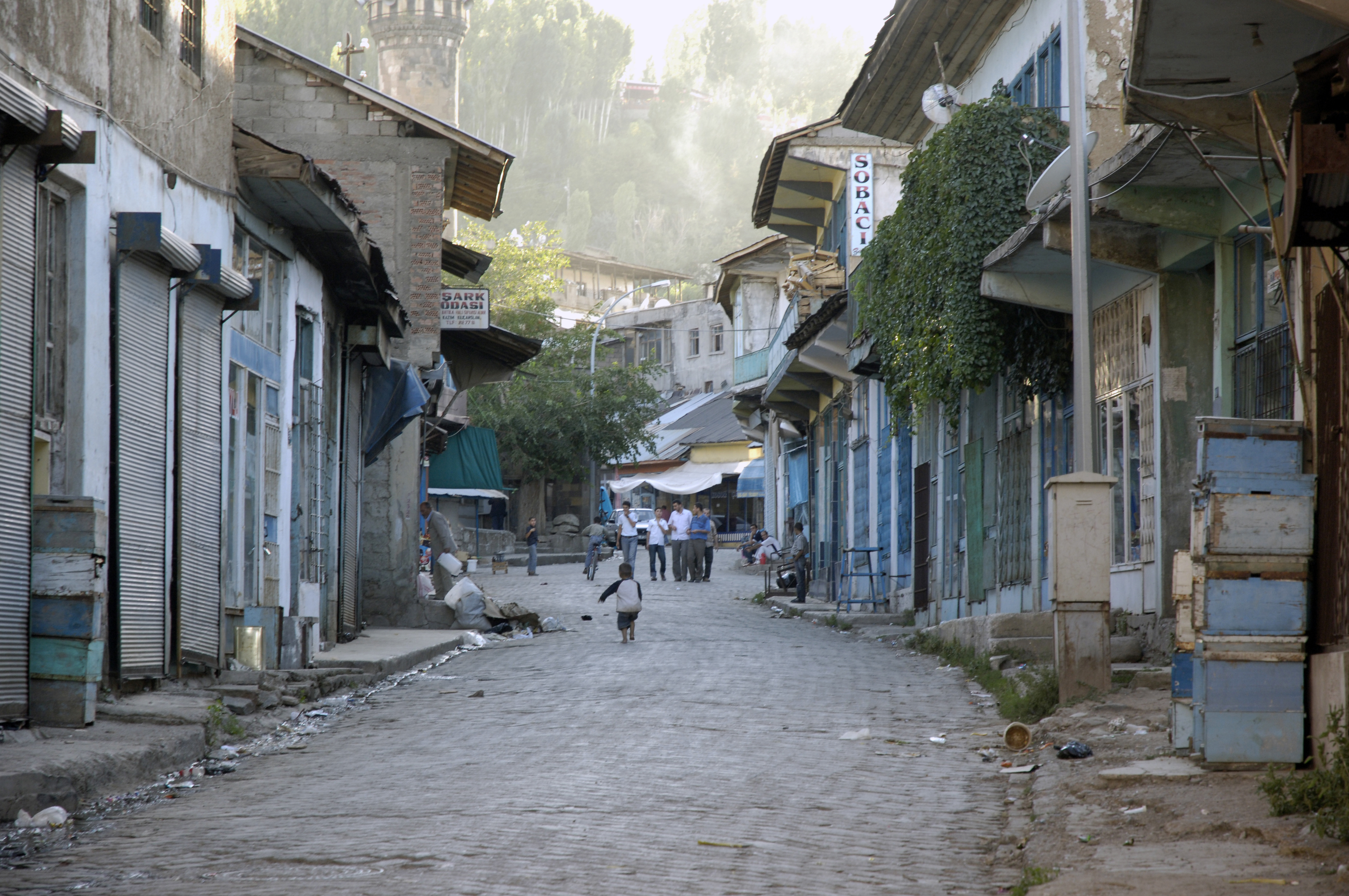
Muş street scene

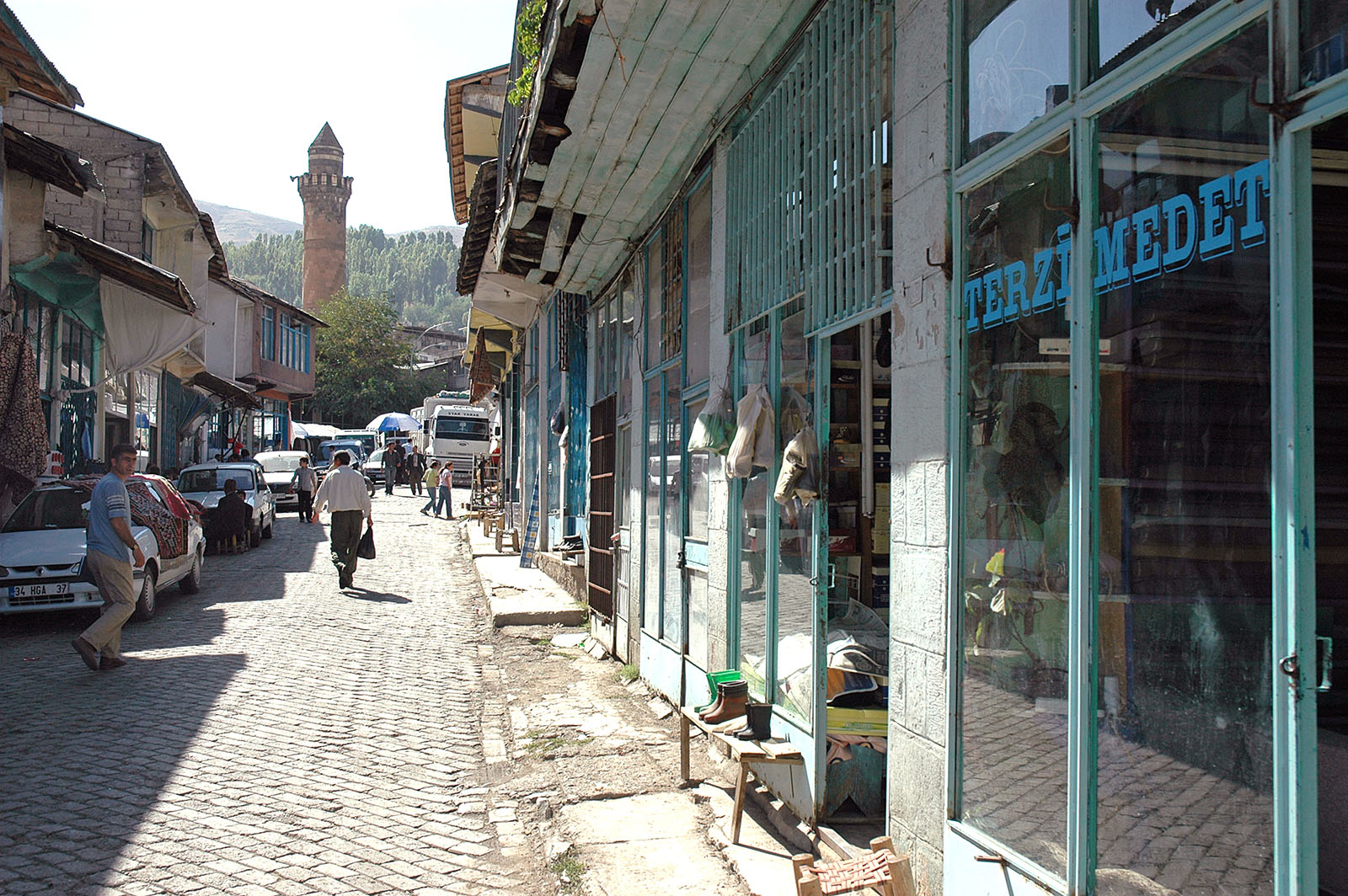
Muş street scene

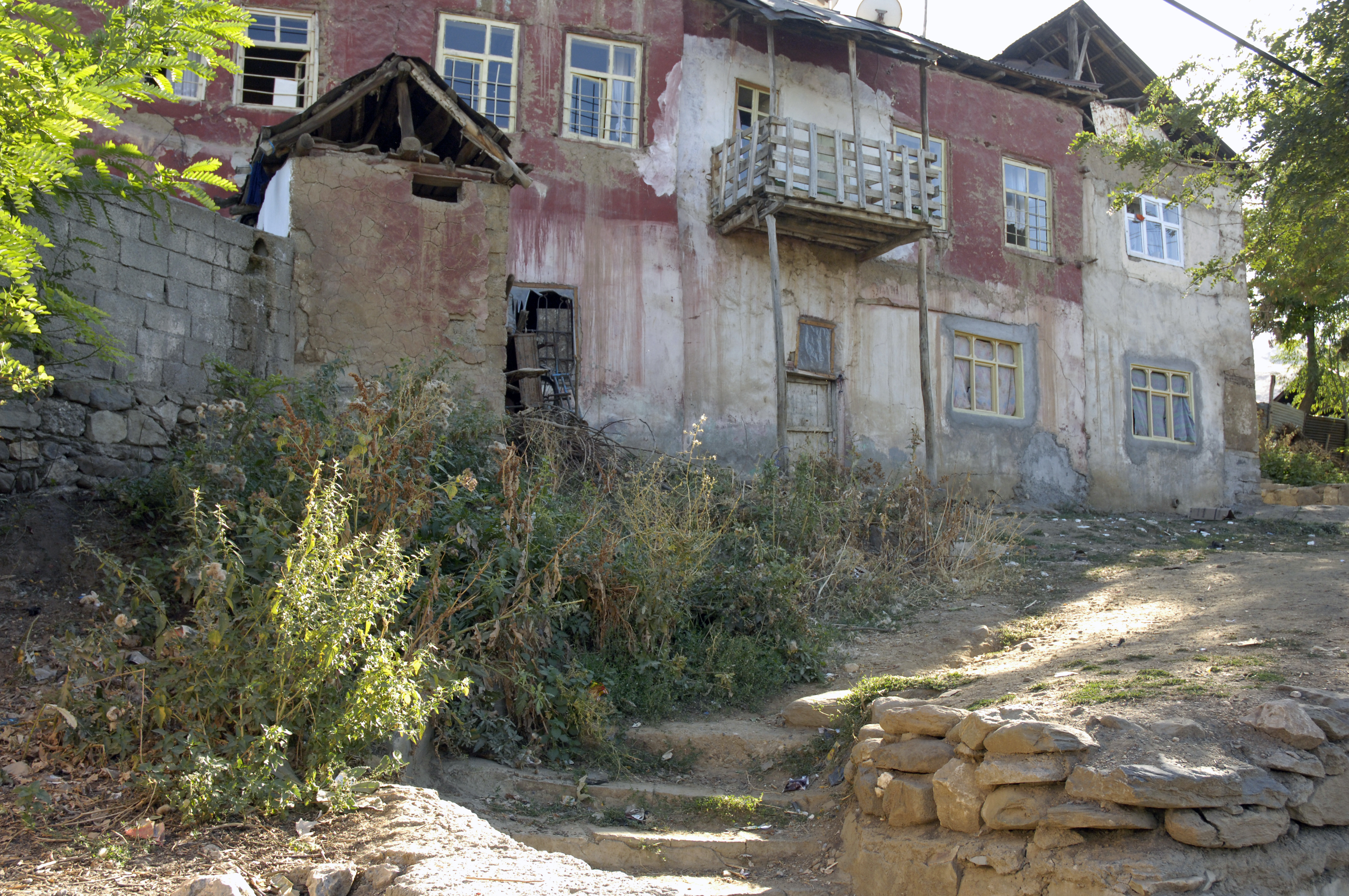
Old house in Muş

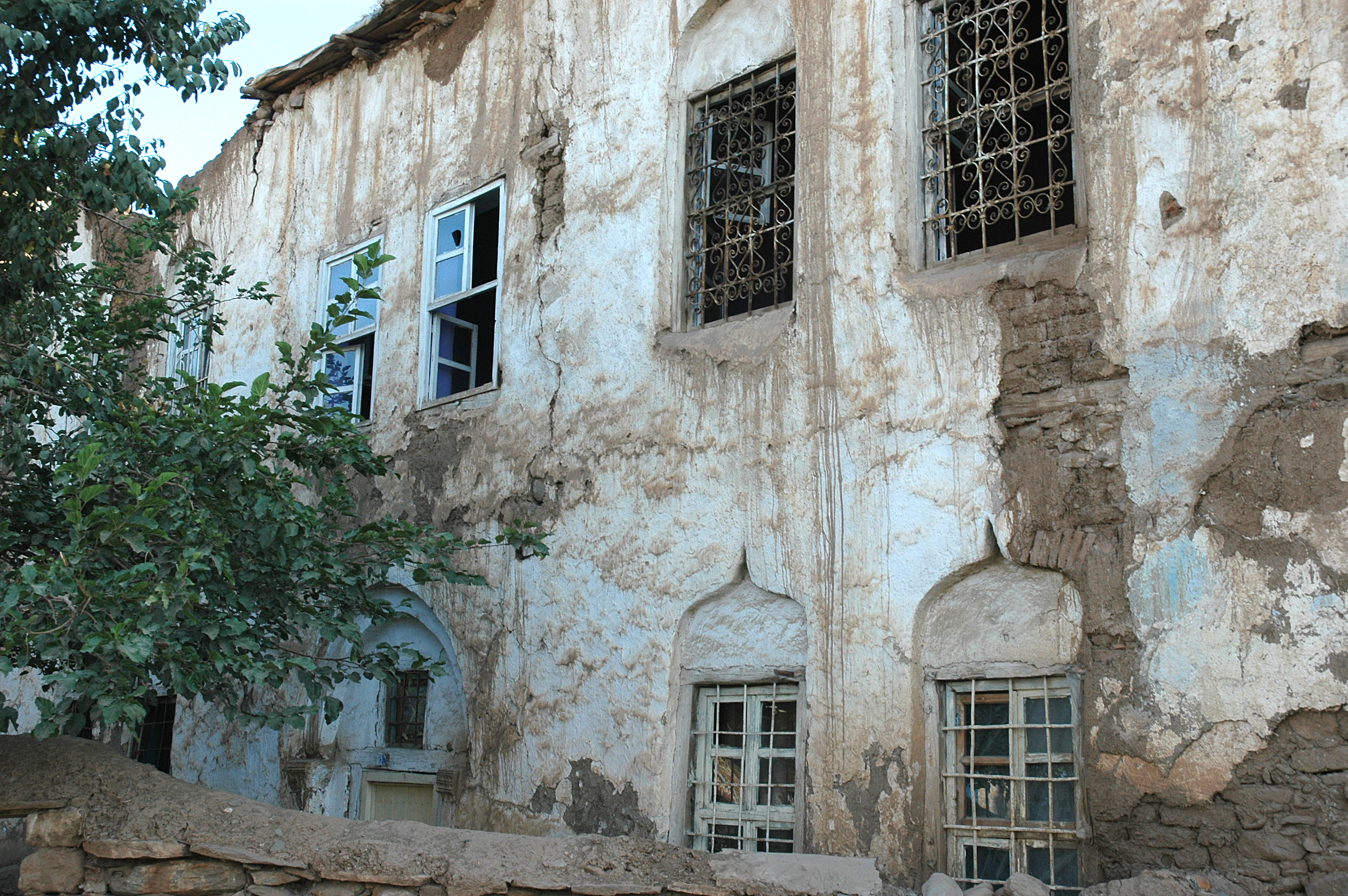
Old house in Muş

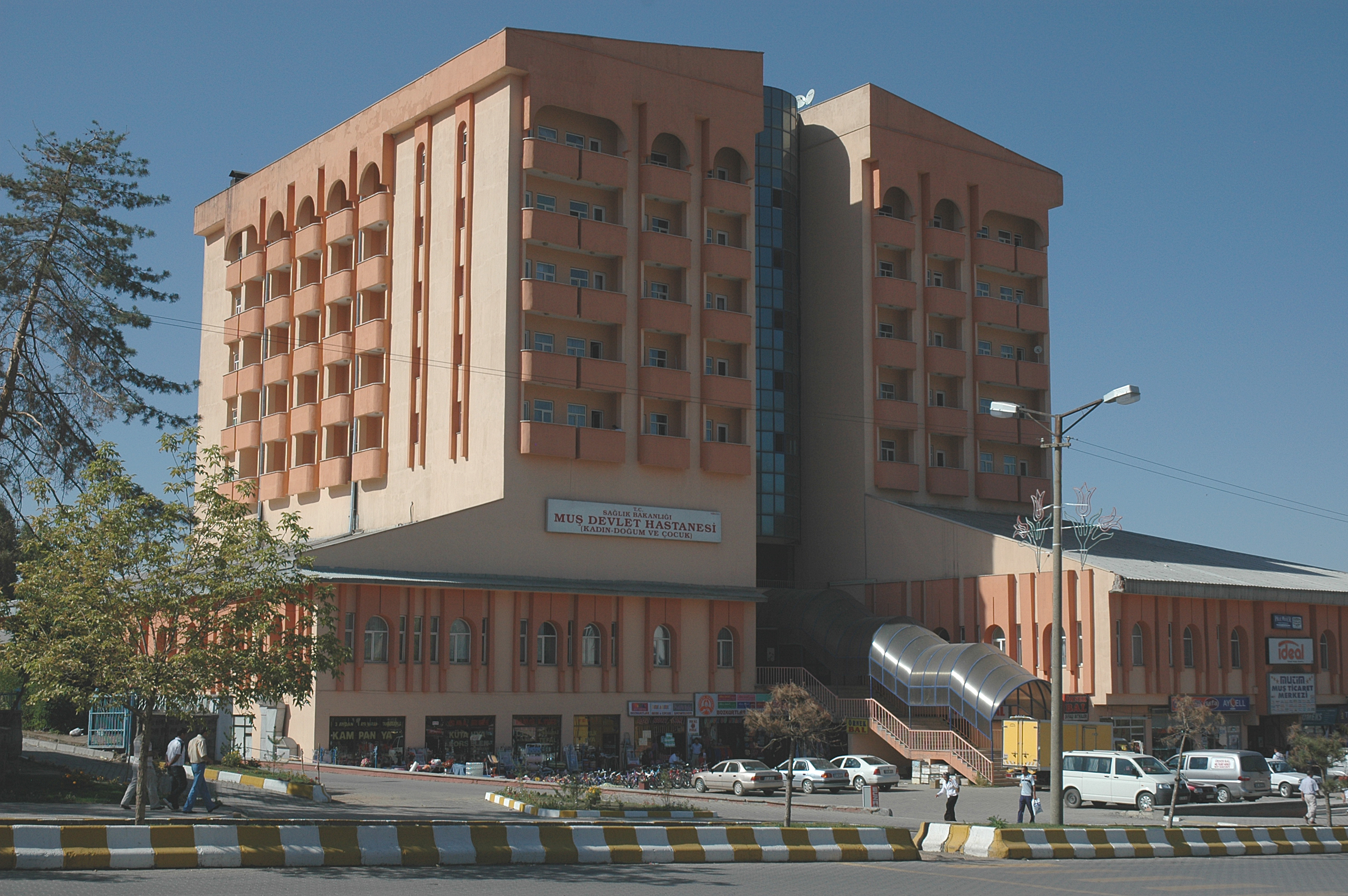
Muş Hospital

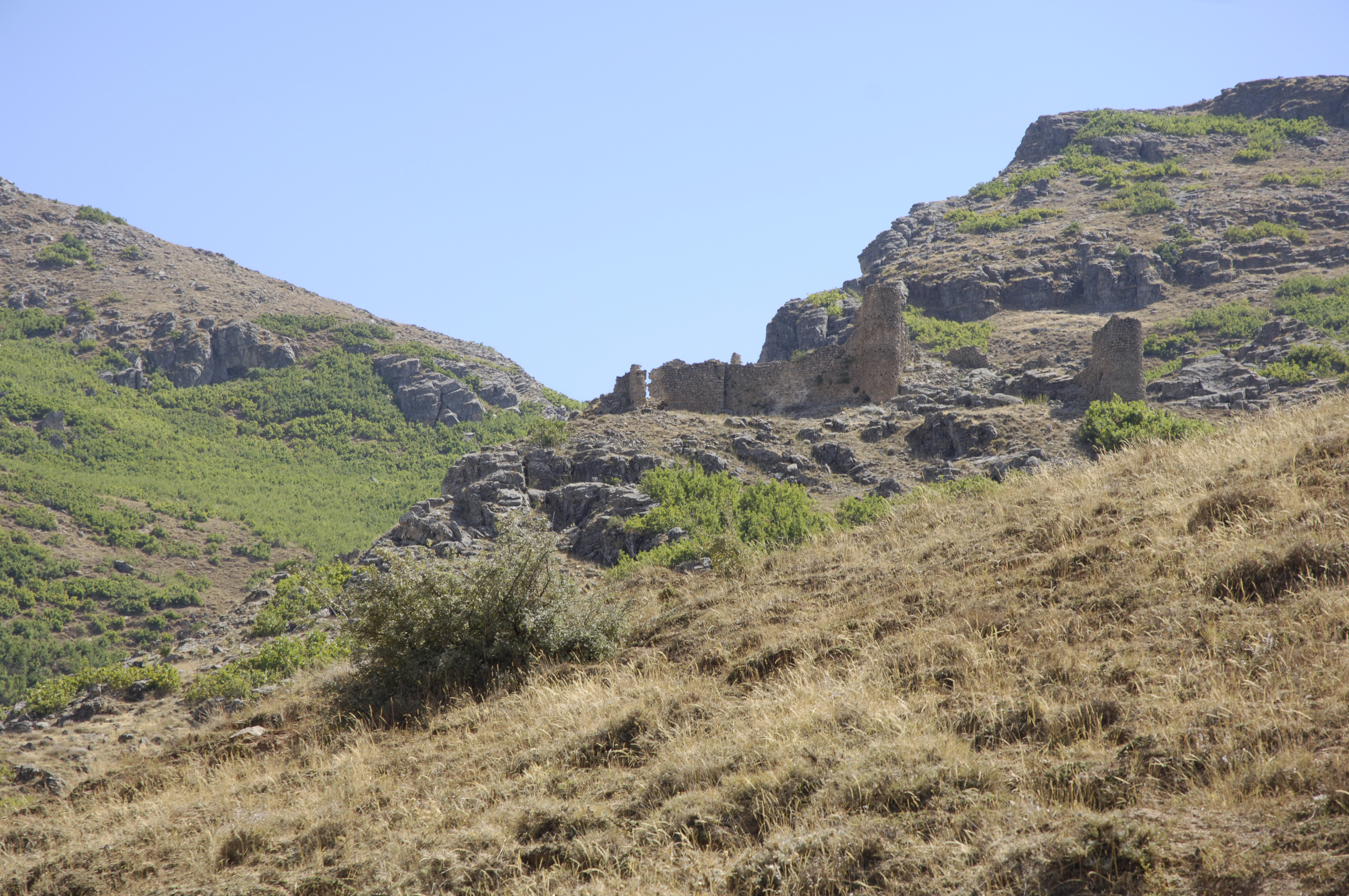
Haspet Castle

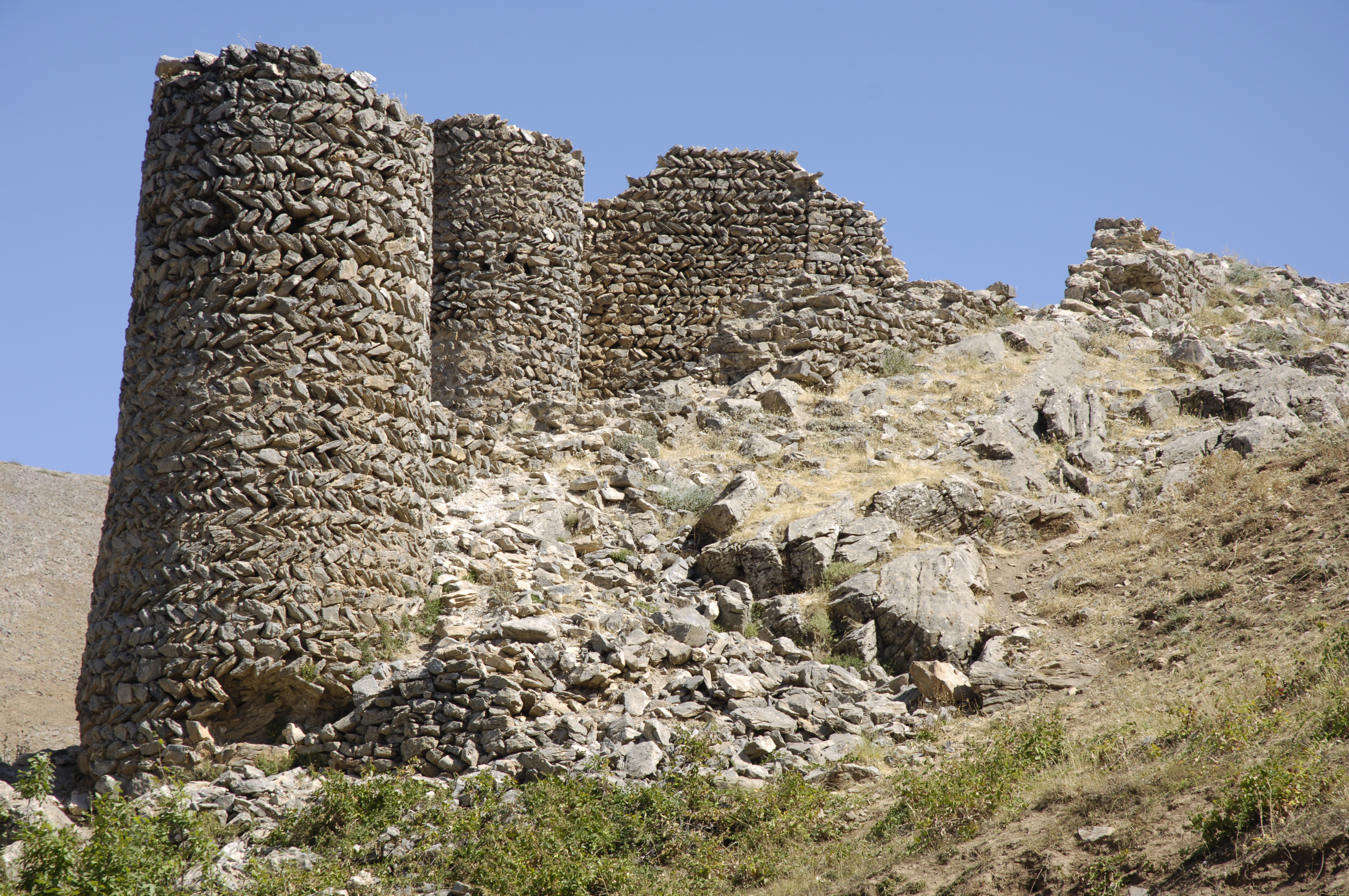
Haspet Castle

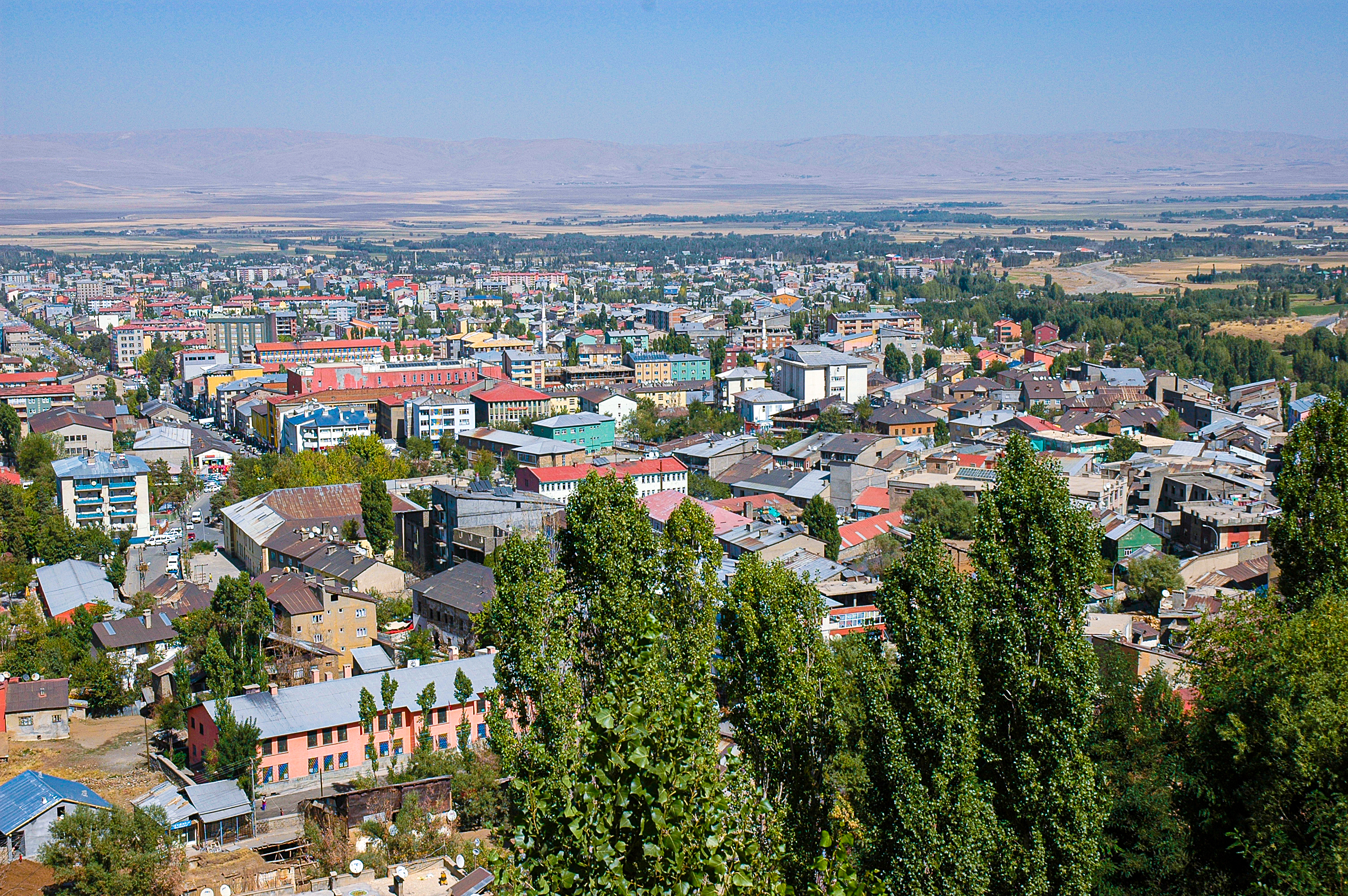
View of Muş

== Notable people ==
- Zafer Çağlayan, Turkish politician and former minister
- Kürşat Duymuş, Turkish football defender
- Zeki Eker, Turkish politician of Kurdish origin
- Sabahattin Oğlago, four-time Olympian cross-country skier
- Armenak Shahmuradyan, Armenian operatic tenor
- Zeki Çelik football player

== Climate ==
Muş has a humid continental climate (Köppen climate classification: Dsa, Trewartha climate classification: Dcao) with cold, snowy winters and hot, dry and sunny summers.

Climate data for Muş (1991–2020, extremes 1964–2022)
Month	Jan	Feb	Mar	Apr	May	Jun	Jul	Aug	Sep	Oct	Nov	Dec	Year
Record high °C (°F)	10.2 (50.4)	15.0 (59.0)	22.8 (73.0)	30.0 (86.0)	32.2 (90.0)	37.4 (99.3)	41.6 (106.9)	41.2 (106.2)	37.0 (98.6)	30.6 (87.1)	22.8 (73.0)	16.0 (60.8)	41.6 (106.9)
Mean daily maximum °C (°F)	−2.8 (27.0)	−0.7 (30.7)	6.8 (44.2)	15.4 (59.7)	21.7 (71.1)	28.3 (82.9)	33.6 (92.5)	33.9 (93.0)	28.6 (83.5)	20.5 (68.9)	10.2 (50.4)	1.0 (33.8)	16.4 (61.5)
Daily mean °C (°F)	−6.5 (20.3)	−4.9 (23.2)	2.1 (35.8)	9.8 (49.6)	15.1 (59.2)	20.8 (69.4)	25.6 (78.1)	25.7 (78.3)	20.5 (68.9)	13.4 (56.1)	4.9 (40.8)	−2.4 (27.7)	10.3 (50.5)
Mean daily minimum °C (°F)	−9.9 (14.2)	−8.5 (16.7)	−1.8 (28.8)	4.9 (40.8)	9.2 (48.6)	13.4 (56.1)	17.8 (64.0)	17.9 (64.2)	12.9 (55.2)	7.6 (45.7)	0.6 (33.1)	−5.3 (22.5)	4.9 (40.8)
Record low °C (°F)	−32.6 (−26.7)	−34.4 (−29.9)	−31.4 (−24.5)	−10.2 (13.6)	−2.4 (27.7)	2.2 (36.0)	3.6 (38.5)	8.0 (46.4)	0.0 (32.0)	−3.0 (26.6)	−25.8 (−14.4)	−32.0 (−25.6)	−34.4 (−29.9)
Average precipitation mm (inches)	93.9 (3.70)	106.0 (4.17)	112.2 (4.42)	102.1 (4.02)	73.9 (2.91)	28.5 (1.12)	10.0 (0.39)	4.8 (0.19)	17.2 (0.68)	59.7 (2.35)	81.6 (3.21)	92.0 (3.62)	781.9 (30.78)
Average precipitation days	14.27	12.9	14.63	14.93	14.77	6.4	2.3	1.6	3.1	9.4	8.9	12.97	116.17
Average snowy days	12.0	8.0	6.0	0.3	0	0	0	0	0	0	1.3	5.9	33.5
Average relative humidity (%)	80.8	79.4	74.1	65	60.5	48.8	39.2	36	41.3	58.7	71.9	80.8	61.4
Mean monthly sunshine hours	55.8	73.5	133.3	171.0	235.6	288.0	313.1	306.9	258.0	179.8	99.0	46.5	2,160.5
Mean daily sunshine hours	1.8	2.6	4.3	5.7	7.6	9.6	10.1	9.9	8.6	5.8	3.3	1.5	5.9
Source 1: Turkish State Meteorological Service
Source 2: NOAA(humidity), Meteomanz(snowy days 2013-2024)

== Sources and external links ==
- GCatholic - former and titular Armenian Catholic see
- Hundreds of pictures of the town

Bibliography

- Hakobyan, Tadevos (1987). "(Mush)". Պատմական Հայաստանի քաղաքները [Cities of historic Armenia] (in Armenian). Yerevan: "Hayastan" Publishing. pp. 196–203.
- Kévorkian, Raymond H. (2011). The Armenian Genocide: A Complete History. London: I. B. Tauris. ISBN 9781848855618.
