= Surp Marineh Church, Muş =

Church building in Muş, Turkey

Saint Marineh Church
- Սուրբ Մարինէ եկեղեցի
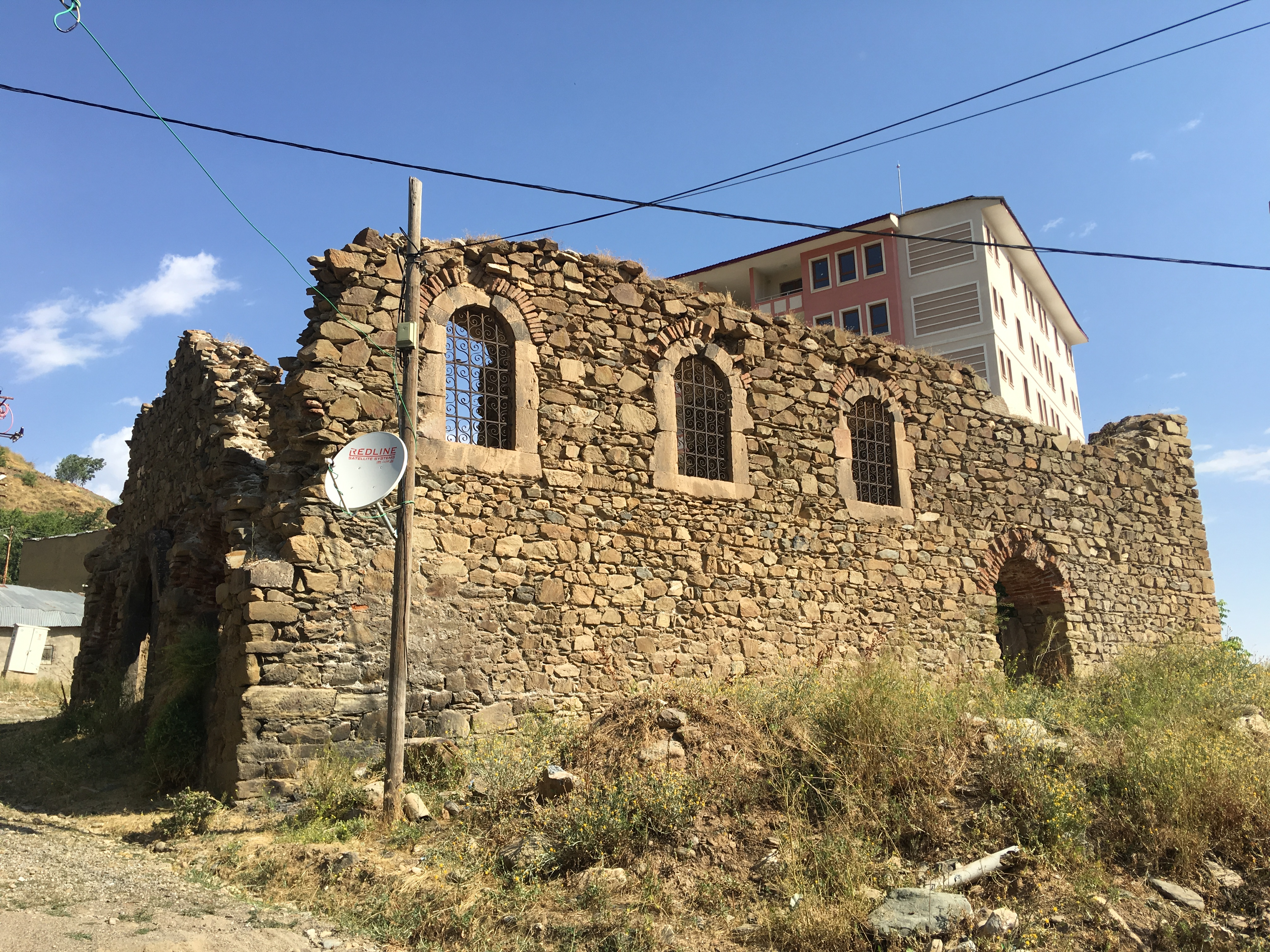

- Location within Turkey

Religion
- Affiliation: Armenian Apostolic Church
- Province: Muş Province
- Region: Eastern Anatolia region
- Status: Ceased functioning as a church in 1915

Location
- Location: Muş
- Coordinates: 38.7150°N 41.5025°E

Architecture
- Style: Armenian
- Completed: 6th century

Surp Marineh Church (Armenian: Սուրբ Մարինէ եկեղեցի) was one of eight churches existing in town of Moush (Armenian: Մուշ) before the Armenian genocide. Surp Marineh was the most notable church in whole Tarawn (Armenian: Տարոն) region of Historical Armenia, and was known as "Katoghike" (Armenian: Կաթողիկէ meaning Cathedral). Currently it is in a ruinous state and only parts of the outer walls still stand.

== Gallery ==
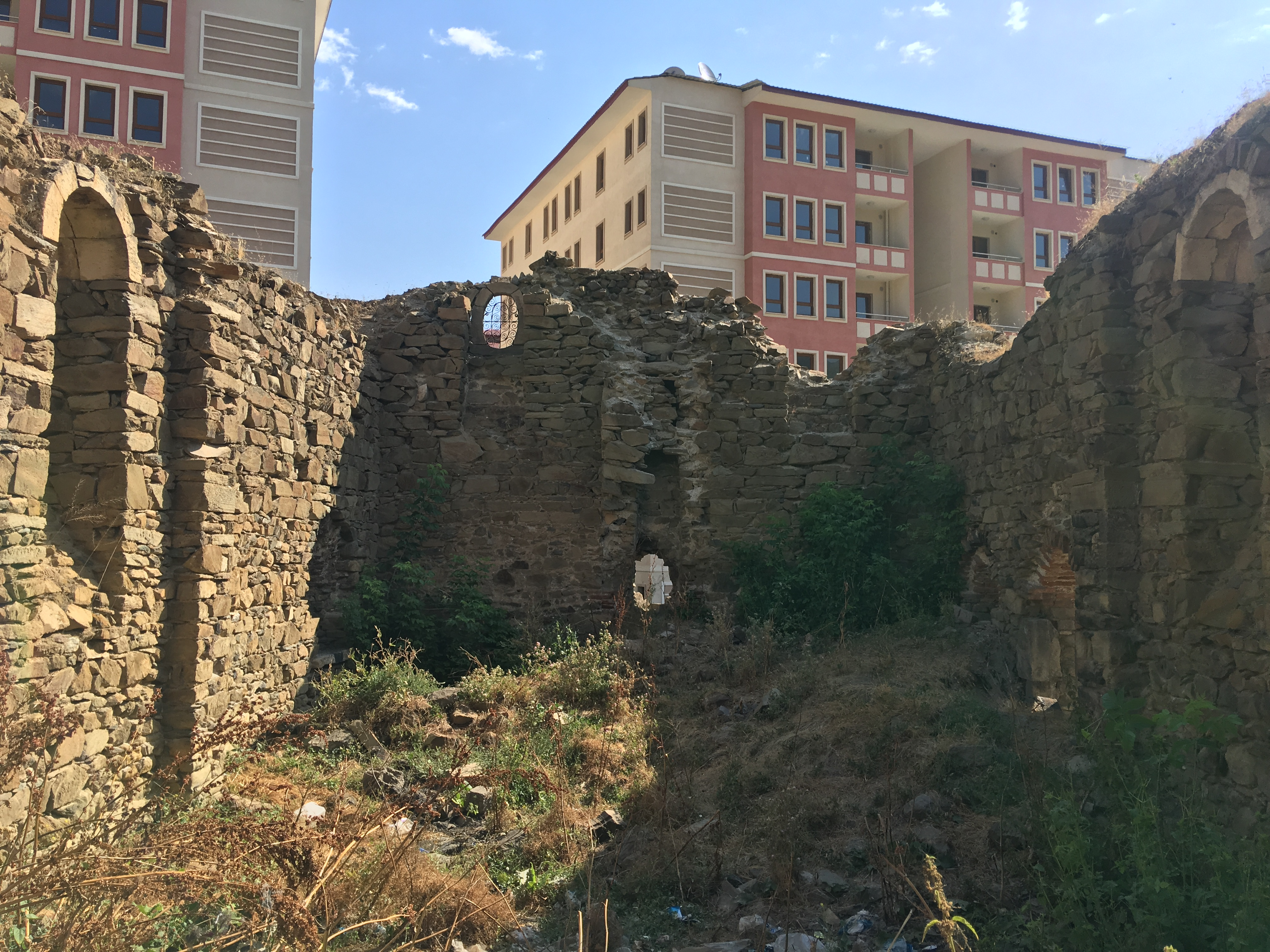

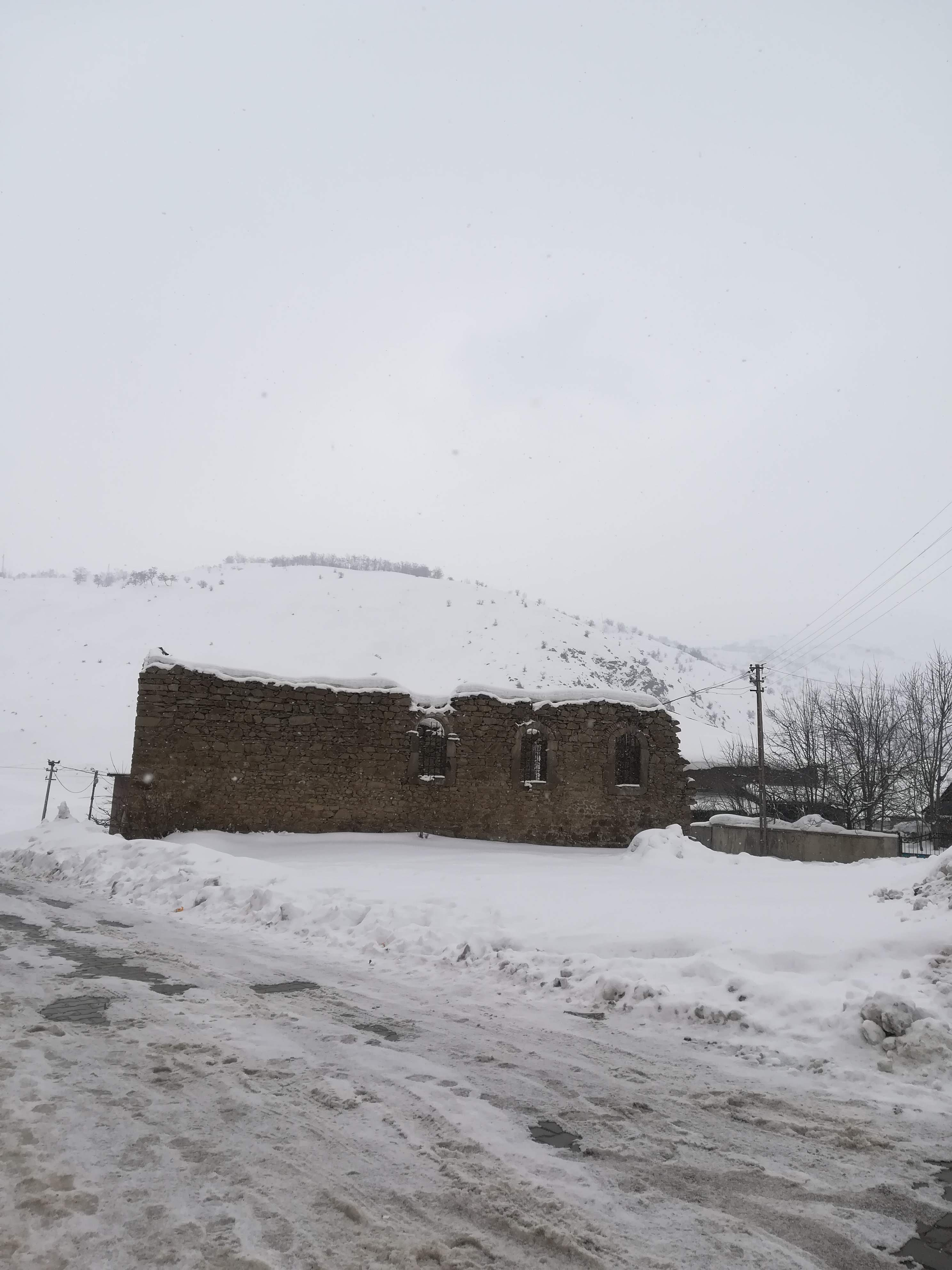

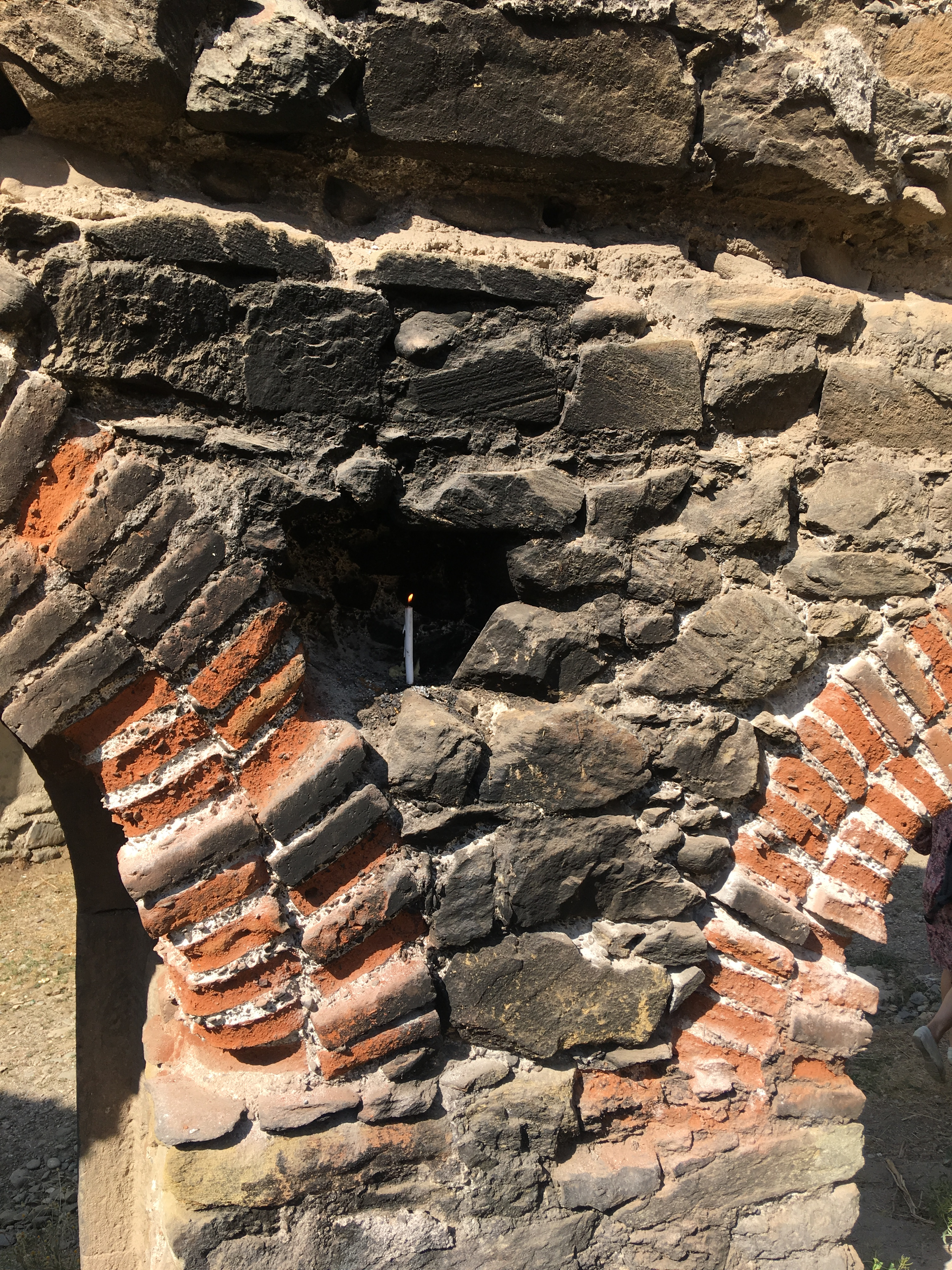

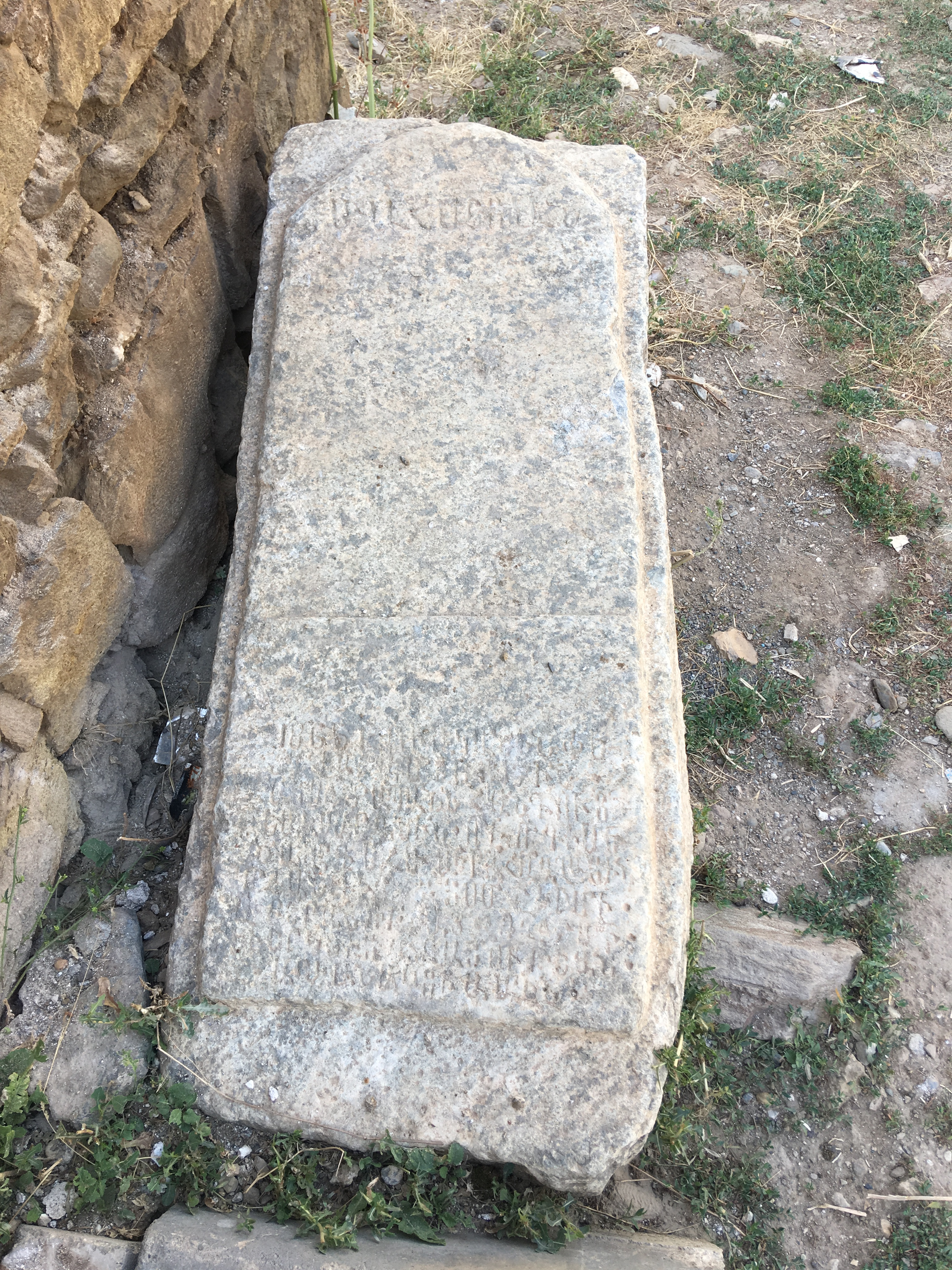
Khachkar
