= Muş railway station =

Railway station in Bitlis, Turkey

Muş train station

General information
- Location: Zafer neighbourhood, Emniyet street, 49200, Muş, Turkey
- Coordinates: 38.7616°N 41.5112°E
- System: TCDD ferry pier
- Owner: Turkish State Railways
- Operator: TCDD Taşımacılık
- Platforms: 1 edge platform, 1 island platform
- Tracks: 6

Construction
- Structure type: At-grade

History
- Opened: 1955
Location

Muş train station (Turkish: Muş Garı) is a railway station and pier in Muş, Turkey.

Located on the Yolçatı-Tatvan railway, the station was built by TCDD and put into service in 1955.

The station serves Van Lake Express Mainline Trains and Elazığ-Tatvan Regional Trains operated by TCDD Taşımalıcılık. Vangölü Express passes through the routes Ankara, Kırıkkale, Kayseri, Sivas, Malatya, Elazığ, Bingöl and Muş, and finally ends in the Tatvan district of Bitlis.
