= Haspet Castle =

Massive stone fortification in Turkey

- Donatım village, Muş, Turkey
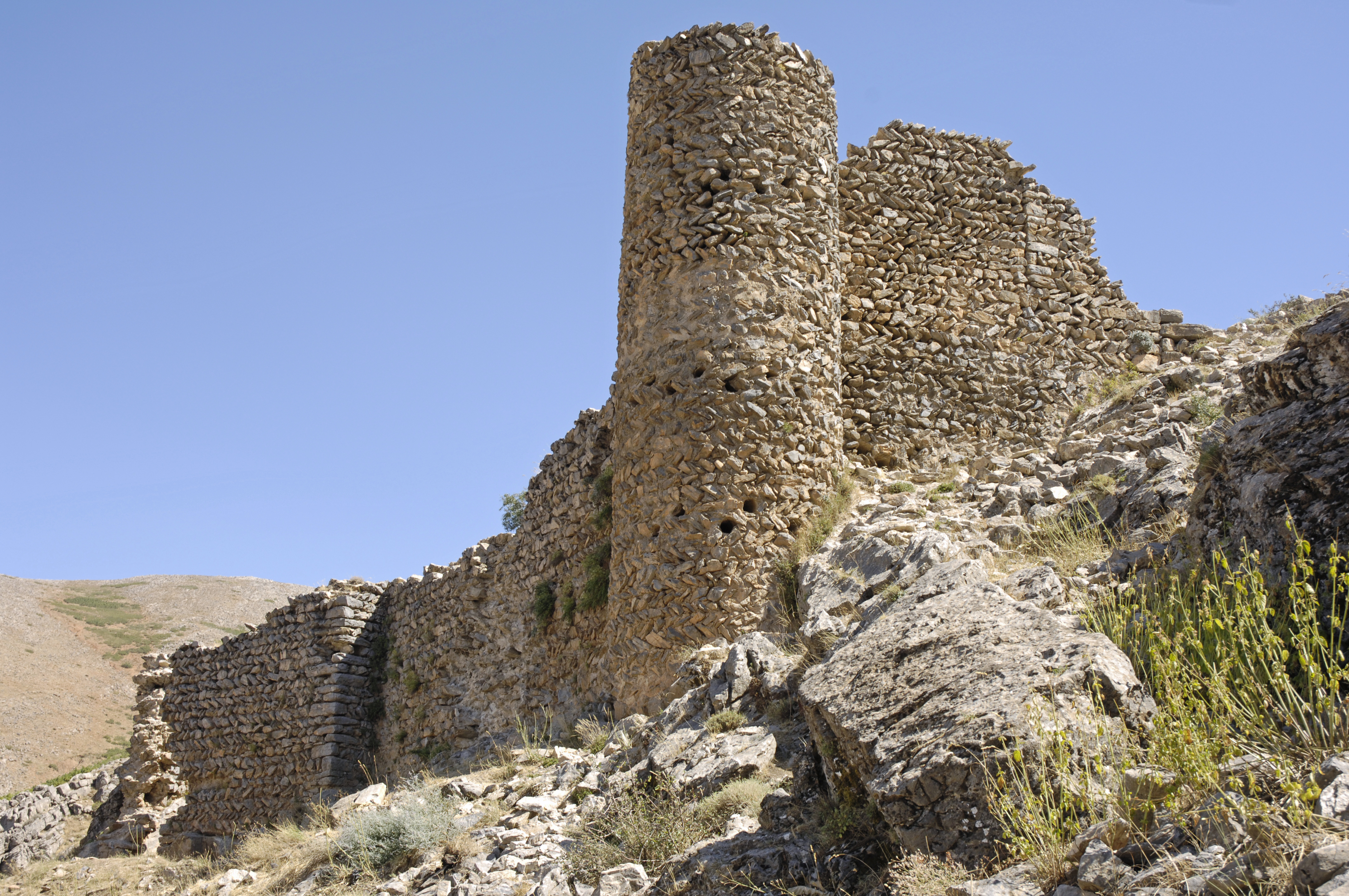
- View of Haspet Castle

Site information
- Type: Fortress
- Open to the public: Yes
- Condition: Large sections of walls are still standing.

Location
- Coordinates: 38°42′49″N 41°30′53″E

Site history
- Materials: Unmortared basalt (lower walls) and mud-bricks
- Demolished: Partially

The Haspet Castle Turkish: Haspet Kalesi), is a historical castle on the mountain slope in the central district of Muş.

== History ==
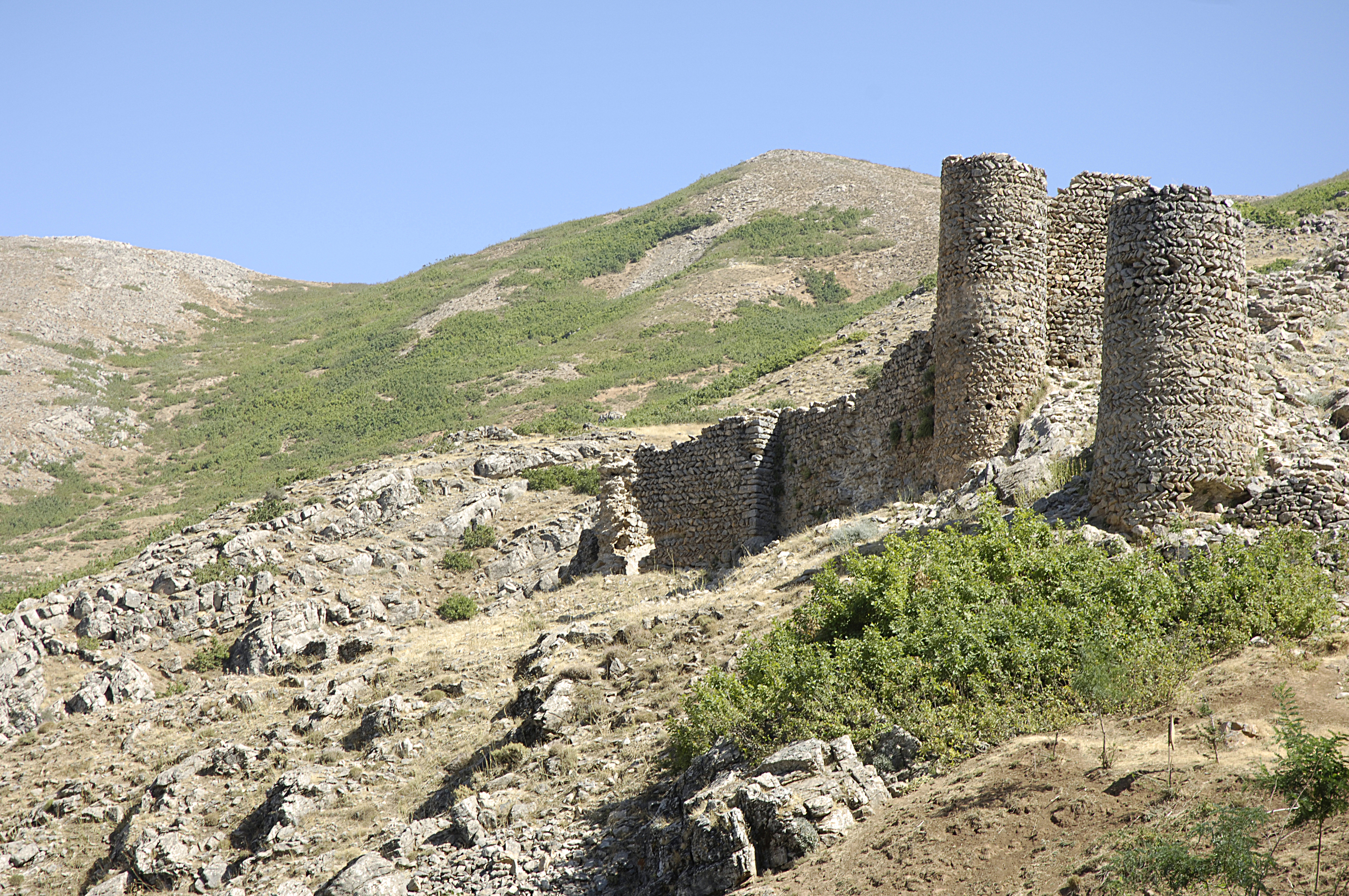
A view from Haspet Castle.

Although the exact date of the castle is unknown, it is rumored that it was built during the reign of Alexander the Great.
