= Donatım, Muş =

Donatım
- Village
- Location within Turkey
- Coordinates: 38.71951°N 41.53652°E
- Country: Turkey
- Province: Muş
- District: Muş
- Population (2022): 779
- Time zone: UTC+3 (TRT)

Donatım, also known as Derkevank (Armenian: Դերքեվանք, romanized: Derk'evank, Kurdish: Tirkwank), is a village of Muş District, Muş Province, Eastern Anatolia in Turkey. Its population is 779 in 2022.

== History ==
Human settlement has happened in the area for about 10,000 years. During the Middle Ages, The area was the center of the Taron kingdom region of Armenia. In the late 8th century the area came under control of the Armenian Bagratid (Bagratuni) dynasty, until it was captured and annexed to the Byzantine Empire in 969. Haspet castle is located on a hill in Donatım. In the 11th century, the town was ruled by Islamic dynasties such as the Ahlatshahs, then in the 16th the Ottomans took control over the area.

In 1890, the records of the Armenian church indicate there were 89 Armenian households in Terkevank and an estimate of 40 Kurdish households. In 1910, the church records saw a reduction in christian households to 67 but on the eve of the Armenian church records show Armenians in 96 households.

The town had a church dedicated to Saint Toros.

During the Armenian genocide of 1915 the indigenous Armenian population of the region was exterminated.
