= Athletics at the 1952 Summer Olympics – Men's triple jump =

Men's triple jump at the Games of the XV Olympiad
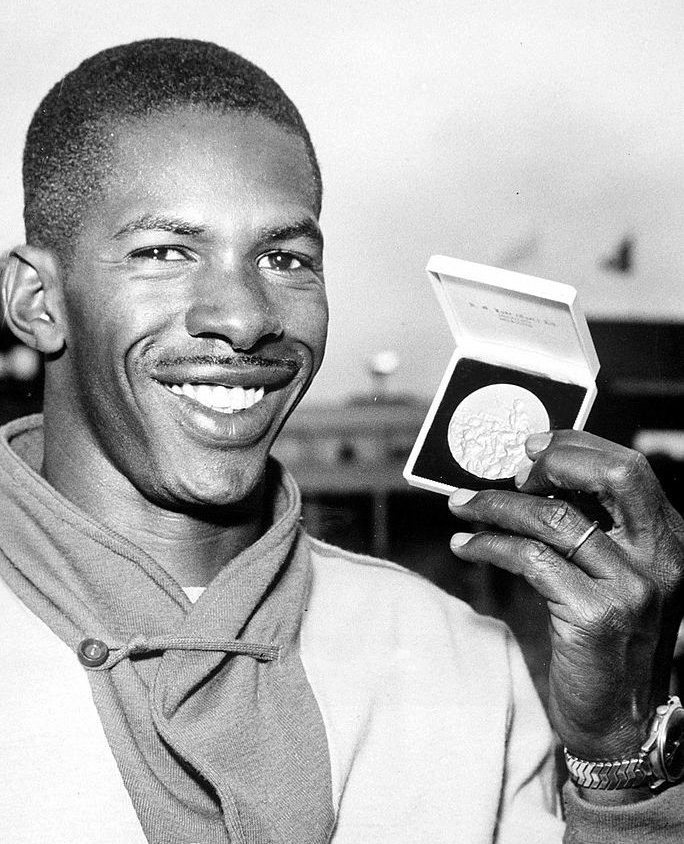
- Adhemar da Silva (1956)
- Venue: Helsinki Olympic Stadium
- Date: July 23, 1952
- Competitors: 35 from 23 nations
- Winning distance: 16.22 WR

Medalists
1st place, gold medalist(s)		Adhemar da Silva; Brazil
2nd place, silver medalist(s)		Leonid Shcherbakov; Soviet Union
3rd place, bronze medalist(s)		Asnoldo Devonish; Venezuela

The men's triple jump at the 1952 Olympic Games took place on 23 July at the Helsinki Olympic Stadium. Thirty-five athletes from 23 nations competed. The maximum number of athletes per nation had been set at 3 since the 1930 Olympic Congress. Brazilian athlete Adhemar da Silva won the gold medal, breaking the world record twice. It was Brazil's first medal and first victory in the men's long jump. All three of the nations represented on the podium were relatively new to the event in the Olympics; Brazil had sent triple jumpers in 1948 (including da Silva), but the Soviet Union (Leonid Shcherbakov's silver) and Venezuela (Asnoldo Devonish's bronze) each won medals in their first appearance.

== Background ==
This was the 12th appearance of the event, which is one of 12 athletics events to have been held at every Summer Olympics. Returning finalists from the 1948 Games were gold medalist Arne Åhman of Sweden, fourth-place finisher Preben Larsen of Denmark, fifth-place finisher Geraldo de Oliveira of Brazil, sixth-place finisher Valle Rautio of Finland, and eighth-place finisher Adhemar da Silva of Brazil. The last of these, da Silva, had been very successful in the intervening four years; he tied the world record in 1950 and broke it in 1951, as well as winning the Pan American championship. He was "co-favorite" with European champion Leonid Shcherbakov of the Soviet Union.

Belgium, Egypt, Ghana, Puerto Rico, Saar, the Soviet Union, and Venezuela each made their first appearance in the event. The United States competed for the 12th time, having competed at each of the Games so far.

== Competition format ==
The competition used the two-round format introduced in 1936. In the qualifying round, each jumper received three attempts to reach the qualifying distance of 14.55 metres; if fewer than 12 men did so, the top 12 (including all those tied) would advance. In the final round, each athlete had three jumps; the top six received an additional three jumps, with the best of the six to count.

== Records ==
Prior to this competition, the existing world and Olympic records were as follows.

World record	Adhemar da Silva (BRA)	16.01	Rio de Janeiro, Brazil	30 September 1951
Olympic record	Naoto Tajima (JPN)	16.00	Berlin, Germany	6 August 1936

Adhemar da Silva jumped further than his own world record four times: 16.12 in the second jump in the final round, 16.09 in the fourth, 16.22 in the fifth, and 16.05 in the sixth.

== Schedule ==
All times are Eastern European Summer Time (UTC+3)

Date	Time	Round
Wednesday, 23 July 1952	10:00; 15:00	Qualifying; Final

== Results ==
=== Qualifying ===
Those achieving the qualifying performance of 14.55 metres advanced to the final.

Rank	Group	Athlete	Nation	1	2	3	Distance	Notes
1	A	Adhemar da Silva	Brazil	15.32	—	—	15.32	Q
2	A	Asnoldo Devonish	Venezuela	14.22	15.24	—	15.24	Q
3	B	Leonid Shcherbakov	Soviet Union	15.05	—	—	15.05	Q
4	A	Jim Gerhardt	United States	14.98	—	—	14.98	Q
5	A	Reino Hiltunen	Finland	X	14.82	—	14.82	Q
6	A	Yoshio Iimuro	Japan	14.81	—	—	14.81	Q
7	B	Arne Åhman	Sweden	13.23	14.72	—	14.72	Q
8	B	Rune Nilsen	Norway	14.65	—	—	14.65	Q
9	B	Zygfryd Weinberg	Poland	14.46	14.65	—	14.65	Q
10	B	Geraldo de Oliveira	Brazil	14.64	—	—	14.64	Q
11	A	Preben Larsen	Denmark	14.62	—	—	14.62	Q
12	B	Tadashi Yamamoto	Japan	13.90	14.30	14.60	14.60	Q
13	B	Rui Ramos	Portugal	13.91	X	14.59	14.59	Q
14	A	Walter Ashbaugh	United States	14.59	—	—	14.59	Q
14	B	Roger Norman	Sweden	14.59	—	—	14.59	Q
16	A	Jacques Boulanger	France	X	14.37	14.49	14.49	
17	B	José da Conceição	Brazil	14.25	X	14.46	14.46	
18	A	Choi Yeong-gi	South Korea	12.11	14.38	14.44	14.44	
19	A	Malik M'Baye	France	14.34	13.86	14.39	14.39	
20	A	Keizo Hasegawa	Japan	X	14.39	14.18	14.39	
21	B	George Shaw	United States	13.64	14.39	X	14.39	
22	B	Pentti Uusihauta	Finland	X	X	14.38	14.38	
23	B	Valle Rautio	Finland	14.14	X	X	14.14	
24	B	Rade Radovanović	Yugoslavia	13.42	X	14.13	14.13	
25	A	William Laing	Ghana	13.89	14.09	13.95	14.09	
26	B	Vasilios Sakellarakis	Greece	14.05	13.73	13.68	14.05	
27	A	Eugénio Lopes	Portugal	13.67	14.05	13.55	14.05	
28	A	Stanisław Kowal	Poland	14.03	X	X	14.03	
29	A	Willi Burgard	Saar	13.47	X	13.86	13.86	
30	A	Nikola Dagorov	Bulgaria	13.39	12.16	13.82	13.82	
31	B	Felix Würth	Austria	13.65	X	13.53	13.65	
32	A	Akin Altiok	Turkey	13.14	12.98	13.62	13.62	
33	A	Walter Herssens	Belgium	13.52	13.03	13.11	13.52	
34	A	Fawzi Chaaban	Egypt	12.85	X	13.45	13.45	
35	A	Francisco Castro	Puerto Rico	13.35	13.27	13.37	13.37	
—	A	Vladimir Filippov	Soviet Union	DNS				
—	B	Mikhail Mikhail	Greece	DNS				
—	B	Neville Price	South Africa	DNS				
—	B	Héctor Román	Puerto Rico	DNS				
—	B	Kamtorn Sanidwong	Thailand	DNS				
—	B	Oscar Simón	Spain	DNS				

=== Final ===
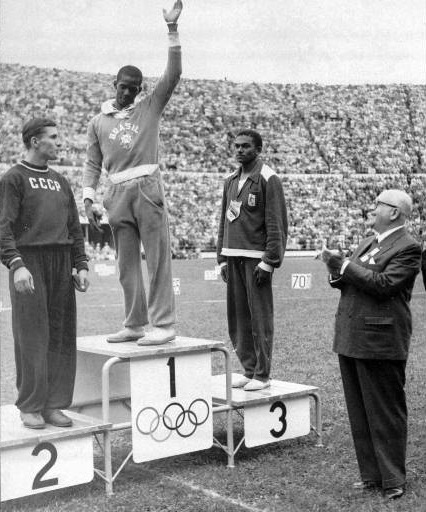
Medal ceremony

Devonish was injured and did not jump after the second round.

Rank	Athlete	Nation	1	2	3	4	5	6	Distance	Notes
1st place, gold medalist(s)	Adhemar da Silva	Brazil	15.95	16.12 WR	15.54	16.09	16.22 WR	16.05	16.22	WR
2nd place, silver medalist(s)	Leonid Shcherbakov	Soviet Union	15.07	15.26	15.18	15.98	15.84	X	15.98	
3rd place, bronze medalist(s)	Asnoldo Devonish	Venezuela	15.04	15.52	—	—	—	—	15.52	
4	Walter Ashbaugh	United States	15.05	15.39	14.56	14.50	15.38	X	15.39	
5	Rune Nilsen	Norway	15.13	14.21	X	14.70	X	X	15.13	
6	Yoshio Iimuro	Japan	14.99	X	X	X	14.66	13.70	14.99	
7	Geraldo de Oliveira	Brazil	X	14.95	12.66	Did not advance			14.95	
8	Roger Norman	Sweden	14.89	X	12.66	Did not advance			14.89	
9	Reino Hiltunen	Finland	14.85	X	14.40	Did not advance			14.85	
10	Zygfryd Weinberg	Poland	14.76	X	X	Did not advance			14.76	
11	Jim Gerhardt	United States	14.69	14.28	14.06	Did not advance			14.69	
12	Rui Ramos	Portugal	14.69	13.82	12.15	Did not advance			14.69	
13	Preben Larsen	Denmark	14.62	X	14.19	Did not advance			14.62	
14	Tadashi Yamamoto	Japan	X	X	14.57	Did not advance			14.57	
15	Arne Åhman	Sweden	X	X	14.05	Did not advance			14.05	
