= 1950 European Athletics Championships – Men's triple jump =

Men's triple jump at the European Athletics Championships

The men's triple jump at the 1950 European Athletics Championships was held in Brussels, Belgium, at Heysel Stadium on 23 August 1950.

== Medalists ==
Gold	Leonid Shcherbakov; Soviet Union
Silver	Valdemar Rautio; Finland
Bronze	Ruhi Sarıalp; Turkey

== Results ==
=== Final ===
23 August

Rank	Name	Nationality	Result	Notes
1st place, gold medalist(s)	Leonid Shcherbakov	Soviet Union	15.39	CR
2nd place, silver medalist(s)	Valdemar Rautio	Finland	14.96	
3rd place, bronze medalist(s)	Ruhi Sarıalp	Turkey	14.53	
4	Rune Nilsen	Norway	14.50	
5	Arne Åhman	Sweden	14.48	
6	Lennart Moberg	Sweden	14.46	
7	Preben Larsen	Denmark	14.35	
8	Robert Bobin	France	14.02	
9	Luís García	Portugal	14.01	
10	Sydney Cross	Great Britain	13.97	
11	Drago Petranović	Yugoslavia	13.92	
12	Henk van Egmond	Netherlands	13.90	
13	Felix Würth	Austria	13.85	
14	Ioannis Palamiotis	Greece	13.64	
15	Alojz Zagorc	Yugoslavia	13.64	
16	Paul Willain	Belgium	13.26	

== Participation ==
According to an unofficial count, 16 athletes from 14 countries participated in the event.

- Austria (1)
- Belgium (1)
- Denmark (1)
- Finland (1)
- France (1)
- Greece (1)
- Netherlands (1)
- Norway (1)
- Portugal (1)
- Soviet Union (1)
- Sweden (2)
- Turkey (1)
- Great Britain (1)
- Yugoslavia (2)
