= Deaths in May 1999 =

The following is a list of notable deaths in May 1999.

Entries for each day are listed alphabetically by surname. A typical entry lists information in the following sequence:

- Name, age, country of citizenship at birth, subsequent country of citizenship (if applicable), reason for notability, cause of death (if known), and reference.

== May 1999 ==
=== 1 ===
- Eddie Chamblee, 79, American tenor, alto saxophonist and vocalist.
- Engelbert Hundertpfund, 81, Austrian Olympic cross-country skier (1948).
- Alish Lambaranski, 84, Soviet and Azerbaijani statesman.
- Jos LeDuc, 54, Canadian professional wrestler, lung infection.
- Osman Ahmed Osman, 82, Egyptian engineer, entrepreneur, and politician.
- Jack Sepkoski, 50, American paleontologist.
- Brian Shawe-Taylor, 84, British racing driver.
- Roger Verhaes, 78, Belgian Olympic athlete (1948).

=== 2 ===
- Thomas C. Cochran, 97, American economic historian and author.
- Bill Davidson, 64, American football player and coach and college athletics administrator.
- Igor M. Diakonoff, 84, Russian historian, linguist and translator.
- Ernest A. Gross, 92, American diplomat and lawyer.
- Douglas Harkness, 96, Canadian politician, teacher and farmer.
- Robert Arthur Humphreys, 91, British historian and professor of Latin American studies.
- Tibor Kalman, 49, American graphic designer, non-Hodgkins lymphoma.
- Oliver Reed, 61, British actor (The Devils, Oliver!, The Three Musketeers), alcohol intoxication, heart attack.
- Włodzimierz Sokorski, 90, Polish communist politician, writer, and brigadier general.
- Anahit Tsitsikian, 72, Armenian female violinist.

=== 3 ===
- Joe Adcock, 71, American baseball player and manager, Alzheimer's disease.
- Steve Chiasson, 32, Canadian ice hockey player, (Detroit Red Wings, Calgary Flames, Carolina Hurricanes), drunk driving crash.
- Godfrey Evans, 78, English cricketer.
- Giulio Fioravanti, 75, Italian operatic baritone.
- Rune Hammarström, 78, Swedish Olympic speed skater (1948).
- Princess Urraca of the Two Sicilies, 85, German noblewoman and member of the House of Bourbon-Two Sicilies.
- Josef Zeman, 84, Czech football player.

=== 4 ===
- Manny Babbitt, 50, U.S. Marine veteran of the Vietnam War and convicted murderer, execution by lethal injection.
- Bob Dietz, 81, American basketball player.
- Terry Evans, 87, Canadian wrestler and Olympian (1936).
- Albert Fearnley, 75, English rugby league football player, and coach.
- Wilfried Geeroms, 57, Belgian Olympic hurdler (1964, 1968), cancer.
- Jean Marius René Guibé, 89, French naturalist.
- Mahendra Narayan Nidhi, 77, Nepali politician and Gandhian leader.
- Milenko Pavlović, 39, Yugoslavian Air Force pilot, shot down.
- John Salmon, 88, New Zealand photographer, conservationist, and author.
- Henry Tiller, 84, Norwegian boxer and Olympic medalist (1936).

=== 5 ===
- Vasilis Diamantopoulos, 78, Greek actor, heart attack.
- John Howard, 86, British Army officer during World War II.
- Luis Jiménez, 70, Mexican Olympic fencer (1956).
- Will Owens, 97, American baseball player.
- Américo Paredes, 83, American author.
- Rodrigo Ruiz, 76, Mexican football player.
- Rui da Silva, 47, Brazilian sprinter and Olympian (1976).
- Darwyn Swalve, 52, American actor.

=== 6 ===
- Fehmi Agani, 67, Kosovan sociologist and politician.
- Josef Böck, 85, German Olympic wrestler (1936).
- Keizo Hasegawa, 76, Japanese Olympic triple jumper (1952).
- Kaii Higashiyama, 90, Japanese writer and artist.
- Sven Meyer, 21, German figure skater, suicide by gunshot.
- Johnny Morris, 82, British television presenter.
- Erick Pitau, 47, French Olympic field hockey player (1972).
- Maria Laura Rocca, 81, Italian actress and writer.
- Mark Tuinei, 39, American football player (Dallas Cowboys), drug overdose.

=== 7 ===
- Randi Anda, 100, Norwegian politician.
- Chen Yanyan, 83, Chinese actress and film producer.
- Andrew Gray, 43, British anthropologist and activist for the rights of indigenous peoples, plane crash.
- Joseph Gray, 79, Irish-born English Roman Catholic prelate, Bishop of Shrewsbury.
- Leon Hess, 85, American businessman and owner of the New York Jets.
- Royden Ingham, 88, American Olympic cyclist (1932).
- Elliot Pinhey, 88, British entomologist.
- Yury Zakharanka, 47, Belarusian minister and oppositional politician, murdered by the Lukashenko regime.

=== 8 ===
- Edward Abraham, 85, English biochemist, stroke.
- Dirk Bogarde, 78, British actor (Doctor in the House, The Servant, A Bridge Too Far), heart attack.
- Ed Gilbert, 67, American voice actor (The Transformers, TaleSpin, G.I. Joe: A Real American Hero), lung cancer.
- Soeman Hs, 95, Indonesian author.
- John Kotz, 80, American collegiate basketball player and early professional.
- Michael Nightingale, 76, English actor.
- Alan Paterson, 70, English high jumper and Olympian (1948, 1952).
- Sally Payne, 86, American actress, stroke.
- Dana Plato, 34, American actress (Diff'rent Strokes), suicide by drug overdose.
- Leon Thomas, 61, American jazz and blues vocalist, heart failure.

=== 9 ===
- Harry Blech, 89, British violinist and conductor.
- Shirley Dinsdale, 72, American ventriloquist and television and radio personality, cancer.
- Derek Fatchett, 53, British politician, heart attack.
- Jürgen Fuchs, 48, East German writer and dissident, leukemia.
- Jim Hunt, 95, American athletic trainer.
- Božidar Kantušer, 77, Slovene composer of classical music, cerebral infarct, stroke.
- Wynona Lipman, 75–76, American politician, cancer.
- Ivan M. Niven, 83, Canadian-American mathematician.
- George T. Raymond, 84, American civil rights leader.
- Karamshi Jethabhai Somaiya, 96, Indian educationist.
- Ole Søltoft, 58, Danish actor.

=== 10 ===
- Fred Giffin, 79, Australian Olympic weightlifter (1952).
- Hans Granlid, 72, Swedish novelist and literary researcher.
- Anésia Pinheiro Machado, Brazilian female pilot.
- Albert Mauer, 92, Polish Olympic ice hockey player (1932).
- John Munonye, 70, Nigerian writer.
- Carl Powis, 71, American baseball player (Baltimore Orioles).
- Shel Silverstein, 68, American poet, playwright, and cartoonist, heart attack.
- Eric Willis, 77, Australian politician, Premier of New South Wales (1976).

=== 11 ===
- José Fernández Aguayo, Spanish photography director.
- Eqbal Ahmad, 65, Pakistani political scientist, writer and pacifist, heart failure.
- Tamás Burkus, 26, Hungarian Olympic sports shooter (1996).
- Josef Dostál, 95, Czech botanist, pteridologist, conservationist and climber.
- Elaine Fifield, 68, Australian ballerina.
- Werner Fuchs, 50, German football player, heart attack.
- Albert John Henderson, 78, American judge.
- George Hunter, 60, Scottish motorcycle speedway rider.
- Stanisław Jankowiak, 58, Polish Olympic canoeist (1964).
- Egon Johansen, 79, Danish Olympic field hockey player (1948).
- Birdy Sweeney, 67, Irish actor and comedian.
- Ben Taylor, 71, American baseball player (St. Louis Browns, Detroit Tigers, Milwaukee Braves).
- Robert Thomas, 72, Welsh sculptor.

=== 12 ===
- William James Morgan, 84, Northern Irish unionist politician.
- Robert Rose, 47, Australian sportsman and quadriplegic, complications following surgery.
- Penny Santon, 82, American actress (Matt Houston, Funny Girl, Fletch).
- Saul Steinberg, 84, Romanian-American cartoonist and illustrator.
- Jerzy Stroba, 79, Polish Roman Catholic bishop.
- Daniel Frank Walls, 56, New Zealand theoretical physicist, cancer.
- Huang Yingjie, 87, Chinese Olympic sprinter (1936).

=== 13 ===
- Ibn Baz, 88, Saudi Arabian Islamic scholar.
- Roy Crowson, 84, English biologist.
- Meg Greenfield, 68, American editorial writer, cancer.
- Motohiko Hino, 53, Japanese jazz drummer, liver failure.
- Giuseppe Petrilli, 86, Italian professor and European Commissioner.
- Gene Sarazen, 97, American golf player, complications of pneumonia.
- John Whiting, 90, American sociologist and anthropologist.

=== 14 ===
- Manuel del Cabral, 92, Dominican poet, writer, and diplomat.
- Buck Houghton, 84, American television producer and writer, pulmonary emphysema.
- Tang Pao-yun, 55, Taiwanese actress.
- Joseph F. Smith, 79, American politician, member of the United States House of Representatives (1981-1983).
- William Tucker, 38, American guitarist, suicide by drug overdose and throat-cutting.
- Grete Weil, 92, German writer.
- Asrat Woldeyes, 70, Ethiopian surgeon, heart ailment.
- Jerry Wunderlich, 73, American set decorator (The Exorcist, The Last Tycoon, WarGames).
- Nitya Chaitanya Yati, 74, Indian philosopher, psychologist, author and poet.

=== 15 ===
- Lotfi Baccouche, 25, Tunisian Olympic footballer (1996).
- Valeh Barshadly, 71, Azerbaijani Minister of Defense.
- Lily Fayol, 84, French singer.
- Rob Gretton, 46, British band manager (Joy Division, New Order), heart attack.
- Ernst Mosch, 73, German musician, composer and conductor.
- Kenneth Riches, 90, British Anglican bishop.
- Bob Wilson, 85, American gridiron football player (Brooklyn Dodgers).
- John Minor Wisdom, 93, American circuit judge (United States Court of Appeals for the Fifth Circuit).

=== 16 ===
- Guy Cudell, 82, Belgian politician, mayor of Saint-Josse-ten-Noode (1953–1999), cancer.
- Minder Coleman, 95, American artist.
- Cam Fraser, 67, Canadian football player.
- Bobby Goldman, 60, American bridge player, writer, and official.
- Eva Macapagal, 83, First Lady of the Philippines.
- Andy Norval, 87, Australian rugby player.
- Lembit Oll, 33, Estonian chess grandmaster, suicide by jumping.

=== 17 ===
- James Broughton, 85, American poet, playwright and filmmaker, heart failure.
- Bruce Fairbairn, 49, Canadian musician and record producer.
- Božidar Finka, 73, Croatian linguist and lexicographer.
- George Hill Hodel, 91, American physician and suspect in several murders.
- Henry Jones, 86, American actor, complications from a fall.
- Thelma Kalama, 68, American Olympic swimmer (1948).
- Ed Rimkus, 85, Lithuanian-American Olympic bobsledder (1948).

=== 18 ===
- Juan Manuel Couder, 64, Spanish tennis player.
- Hayrettin Erkmen, 84, Turkish politician.
- Dias Gomes, 76, Brazilian playwright, traffic collision.
- Hank Herring, 76, American boxer and Olympian (1948).
- Miguel Pedro Mundo, 61, American bishop of the Catholic Church.
- Augustus Pablo, 44, Jamaican record producer and musician, respiratory failure.
- Freddy Randall, 78, English jazz trumpeter and bandleader.
- Betty Robinson, 87, American athlete and winner of the first Olympic Woman's 100 m (1928, 1936), Alzheimer's disease.

=== 19 ===
- James Blades, 97, English percussionist.
- Candy Candido, 85, American radio performer, bass player and voice actor.
- Rebecca Elson, 39, Canadian–American astronomer and writer, cancer.
- Hugh Hanrahan, 52, Canadian politician, member of the House of Commons of Canada (1993-1997).
- Larry Markes, 77, American comedian, singer and screenwriter.
- John McSweeney, Jr., 83, American film editor.
- Kalevi Pakarinen, 63, Finnish Olympic fencer (1960).
- Vera Scarth-Johnson, 87, British-Australian botanist and botanical illustrator.
- Xhafer Spahiu, 75, Albanian politician.
- Alister Williamson, 80, Australian-British actor.

=== 20 ===
- William Alfred, 76, American playwright, poet, and academic.
- Renato Gei, 78, Italian football player and manager.
- James E. Hill, 77, United States Air Force general and World War II flying ace, cancer.
- Robert Rhodes James, 66, British politician.
- Carlos Quirino, 89, Filipino biographer and historian.
- Colette Ripert, 69, French actress.

=== 21 ===
- Vanessa Brown, 71, Austrian-American actress, breast cancer.
- Jozef Cleber, 82, Dutch trombonist, violinist, and composer.
- Rauni Essman, 81, Finnish Olympic sprinter (1936).
- Colin Hayes, 75, Australian trainer of thoroughbred racehorses.
- Norman Rossington, 70, English actor.
- Mario Tagliaferri, 71, Italian prelate of the Catholic Church.
- Fulvio Tomizza, 64, Italian writer.

=== 22 ===
- Milton Banana, 64, Brazilian bossa nova and jazz drummer.
- Loleh Bellon, 74, French stage and film actress and playwright.
- Mark Edward Bradley, 92, United States Air Force general and aviator pioneer.
- Rubén W. Cavallotti, 74, Uruguayan-Argentine film director.
- Duilio Coletti, 92, Italian film director and screenwriter, heart attack.
- Alfred Kubel, 90, American politician.

=== 23 ===
- Arthur Edward Ellis, 84, English football referee, cancer.
- Owen Hart, 34, Canadian professional wrestler (WWF), injuries sustained from fall.
- John T. Hayward, 90, American naval aviator during World War II, cancer.
- Perry Johnson, 74-75, Bermudian Olympic sprinter (1948).
- Joel Lawrence, 66, American actor.
- Asa Singh Mastana, 71, Indian musician and singer.
- Janina Mendalska, 62, Polish Olympic canoeist (1960).
- John Prentice, 78, American cartoonist (Rip Kirby).
- Albert Charles Smith, 93, American botanist.

=== 24 ===
- Irene Bache, 98, British artist.
- Kenneth Dodson, 91, American novelist and writer.
- Guru Hanuman, 98, Indian wrestling coach, car crash.
- T. N. Gopinathan Nair, 81, Indian dramatist, novelist, poet and screenwriter.
- Ramón Rubial, 92, Spanish socialist leader.
- Arnaldo Silva, 55, Portuguese football player.

=== 25 ===
- Fredda Brilliant, 96, Polish sculptor and actress.
- Hillary Brooke, 84, American film actress, pulmonary embolism.
- Luc Colin, 63, French Olympic cross-country skier (1968).
- Horst Frank, 69, German film actor, stroke.
- René Gallice, 80, French football player.
- William Meronek, 82, Canadian ice hockey player (Montreal Canadiens).
- Paul Moss, 90, American gridiron football player (Pittsburgh Pirates).
- Bal Dattatreya Tilak, 80, Indian chemical engineer.

=== 26 ===
- William Cutolo, 49, American mobster (Colombo crime family), murdered.
- Sir Hugh Fish, 76, English chemist.
- Joanino, 86, Brazilian footballer.
- Belli Lalitha, 25, Indian folk singer, homicide.
- Felipe Rodríguez, 73, Puerto Rican singer of boleros, fall.
- Paul Sacher, 93, Swiss conductor, patron and impresario.
- Waldo Semon, 100, American inventor.
- Erik von Kuehnelt-Leddihn, 89, Austrian political scientist and journalist.
- Jack Wells, 88, Canadian radio and television broadcaster.

=== 27 ===
- Alice Adams, 72, American short story writer and novelist.
- Zach de Beer, 70, South African politician and businessman, stroke.
- Francine Everett, 84, American actress and singer.
- Timo Lampén, 64, Finnish Olympic basketball player (1964).
- William T. Moore, 81, American attorney and politician.
- Leah Ray, 84, American singer and actress.
- James Rowland, 76, Australian air chief marshal.
- Violet Webb, 84, English track and field athlete and Olympic medalist (1932, 1936).

=== 28 ===
- Michael Barkai, 64, Israeli Navy general, suicide by gunshot.
- Peter Bostock, 87, British Anglican priest.
- Henry Carlsson, 81, Swedish football player, manager, and Olympian (1948).
- Mansour Dia, 58, Senegalese triple jumper and Olympian (1964, 1968, 1972).
- Florence MacMichael, 80, American character actress.
- Raphael Recanati, 75, Israeli-American shipping magnate, banker, and philanthropist, heart failure.
- Lady Rowlands, 95, American film actress.
- Petrus Van Theemsche, 83, Belgian racing cyclist.
- B. Vittalacharya, 79, Indian film director and producer.

=== 29 ===
- Ronald Burns, 66, British Olympic swimmer (1952).
- Joe Busch, 91, Australian rugby player.
- João Carlos de Oliveira, 45, Brazilian athlete and Olympian (1976, 1980), complications of alcoholism.
- Bernard Lajarrige, 87, French film and television actor.
- Mattia Moreni, 78, Italian sculptor and painter.
- Richard Ray, 72, American politician, member of the United States House of Representatives (1983-1993).

=== 30 ===
- Rajesh Singh Adhikari, 28, Indian Army officer.
- Don Harper, 78, Australian composer.
- Sonia Chadwick Hawkes, 65, English archaeologist, cancer.
- Clarence Heise, 91, American baseball player (St. Louis Cardinals).
- William R. Lawley Jr., 78, United States Army Air Forces officer and recipient of the Medal of Honor.
- Kalju Lepik, 78, Estonian poet.
- Paul S. Newman, 75, American writer of comic books and strips, heart attack.

=== 31 ===
- Emilio Baldonedo, 82, Argentine football player and manager.
- Inayat Hussain Bhatti, 71, Pakistani actor, script writer, social worker and columnist.
- Don Biederman, 59, Canadian stock car racer, brain aneurysm.
- Nicolas Bréhal, 46, French novelist and literary critic.
- Davor Dujmović, 29, Bosnian Serb actor, suicide by hanging.
- Willibald Hahn, 89, Austrian football player and manager.
- Anatoli Ivanov, 71, Soviet and Russian writer.
- Auguste Le Breton, 86, French novelist, lung cancer.
- Radomir Lukić, 84, Serbian jurist and academic.
- Charles Pierce, 72, American female impersonator.
- Vic Rouse, 56, American college basketball player (Loyola Ramblers).
- Virendra Kumar Sakhlecha, 69, Indian politician.
