= Deaths in October 2003 =

The following is a list of notable deaths in October 2003.

Entries for each day are listed alphabetically by surname. A typical entry lists information in the following sequence:

- Name, age, country of citizenship at birth, subsequent country of citizenship (if applicable), reason for notability, cause of death (if known), and reference.

== October 2003 ==
=== 1 ===
- John Brim, 81, American Chicago blues musician, heart cancer.
- Huntington Hardisty, 74, U.S. Navy admiral.
- Beate Hasenau, 67, German film and television actress.
- Joy N. Houck, Jr., 61, American actor, screenwriter and film director.
- Chubby Jackson, 84, American jazz double-bassist and band leader.
- Zbigniew Lengren, 84, Polish cartoonist, caricaturist, and illustrator.
- Julie Parrish, 62, American actress, ovarian cancer.
- Frank Taylor, 95, British politician, MP for Manchester Moss Side.

=== 2 ===
- Milan Bjegojević, 75, Serbian basketball player and coach.
- John Thomas Dunlop, 89, American administrator and Secretary of Labor under Gerald Ford.
- Ion Ferenz, 71, Romanian Olympic ice hockey player (1964).
- Otto Günsche, 86, German SS escort of Adolf Hitler, who was tasked to cremate his body on 30 April 1945, heart failure.
- Ahmed Khadr, 55, Egyptian-Canadian Islamist, shot and killed by Pakistani security forces.
- Hasan Mahsum, Turkestani Islamic extremist group leader, shot by the Pakistani Army.
- Denis Moore, 93, English cricketer.
- Gunther Philipp, 85, Austrian film actor, physician and swimmer.

=== 3 ===
- Roxana Cannon Arsht, 88, American judge.
- Joop Bakker, 82, Dutch politician and businessman.
- John Baldock, 87, British politician (MP for Harborough).
- Greg Biagini, 51, American baseball player and coach (Baltimore Orioles).
- Tish Daija, 78, Albanian composer.
- Profira Sadoveanu, 97, Romanian prose writer and poet.
- Gustav Sjöberg, 90, Swedish football goalkeeper and Olympian (1936).
- Florence Stanley, 79, American actress (Barney Miller, Atlantis: The Lost Empire, Dinosaurs), stroke.
- William Steig, 95, American cartoonist and children's author; creator of Shrek.
- Heinz Vroomen, 84, Dutch footballer.
- Winifred Watkins, 79, British biochemist.

=== 4 ===
- Byomkesh Bose, 75-76, Indian footballer and Olympian (1952).
- Bill Cayton, 85, American boxing manager, former manager of Edwin Rosario and Mike Tyson.
- John Horace Ragnar Colvin, 81, British intelligence officer.
- Hanadi Jaradat, 28, Palestinian jihadist, suicide by explosive vest.
- Sid McMath, 91, American attorney and politician, 34th governor of Arkansas.
- Freddie Phillips, 84, British musician and composer.
- Elisabeta Rizea, 91, Romanian anti-communist partisan, viral pneumonia.
- Fred Tuttle, 84, American farmer, actor and politician, heart attack.

=== 5 ===
- Wil van Beveren, 91, Dutch sprinter and Olympian (1936).
- Wally George, 71, American conservative radio and television commentator, pneumonia.
- Neil Postman, 72, American media critic, lung cancer.
- Denis Quilley, 75, British actor, liver cancer.
- Dan Snyder, 25, Canadian professional ice hockey player (Atlanta Thrashers), traffic collision.
- Elena Slough, 114, American supercentenarian and oldest recognized person in the United States.
- Annalena Tonelli, 60, Italian Catholic lay missionary and social activist, homicide.
- Timothy Treadwell, 46, American environmentalist and documentary filmmaker, bear attack.
- František Velecký, 69, Slovak actor and artist.
- Dwain Weston, 30, Australian skydiver and base jumper, accidental death.

=== 6 ===
- Joe Baker, 63, English footballer, heart attack.
- Antony Buck, 74, British politician (Member of Parliament for Colchester, Colchester North).
- Armando Crispino, 78, Italian film director and screenwriter.
- William Herrmann, 91, American gymnast and Olympic medalist (1932).
- Charles Millot, 81, Yugoslav-French actor.
- Azam Tariq, 35, Pakistani politician, homicide.

=== 7 ===
- Izzy Asper, 71, Canadian tax lawyer and media magnate (CanWest Global Communications Corp).
- Arthur Berger, 91, American composer, music critic, teacher and an academic music writer.
- Ryan Halligan, 13, American bullying victim, suicide by hanging.
- John Herring, 68, British athlete and Olympian (1964).
- Eleanor Lambert, 100, American fashion pioneer.
- Viktor Leonov, 86, Soviet Navy officer and twice Hero of the Soviet Union.
- Norodom Narindrapong, 49, Cambodian prince, heart attack.
- Henry Herbert, 17th Earl of Pembroke, 64, British landowner, politician, film director, and producer.

=== 8 ===
- Bob Alwin, 83, American basketball player.
- Juan Armenteros, 75, Cuban baseball player.
- Thalia Mara, 92, American ballet dancer and educator.
- Cyril May, 82, British socialist politician.
- Petter Thomassen, 62, Norwegian politician.
- Junior Wren, 73, American professional football player (Missouri, Cleveland Browns, Pittsburgh Steelers).

=== 9 ===
- Carl Fontana, 75, American jazz trombonist, Alzheimer's disease.
- Ruth Hall, 92, American film actress.
- Carolyn Gold Heilbrun, 77, American academic, suicide by drug overdose.
- Don Lanphere, 75, American jazz tenor and soprano saxophonist.
- Judith Pierce, 72, English operatic soprano.

=== 10 ===
- Igor Borisov, 79, Russian rower and Olympic silver medalist (1952).
- Viola Burnham, 72, Guyanese politician, First Lady to Forbes Burnham and Vice President, cancer.
- Lillian DeCambra, 77, American baseball player.
- Eila Hiltunen, 80, Finnish sculptor.
- Victoria Horne, 91, American actress, appearing in 49 films.
- Eugene Istomin, 77, American pianist, liver cancer.
- Johnny Klippstein, 75, American baseball player (Chicago Cubs, Cincinnati Redlegs, Minnesota Twins).
- Eve Newman, 88, American music and film editor (Academy Award nominations: Wild in the Streets, Two-Minute Warning).
- Julia Trevelyan Oman, 73, British set designer.
- Pastora Peña, 83, Spanish film actress.
- Frank Alois Pitelka, 87, American ornithologist.
- Max Rayne, 85, British property developer and philanthropist.
- Jorge Schneider, 69, Argentine Olympic rower (1952).
- Charles Simms, 75, American Olympic gymnast (1952, 1956).

=== 11 ===
- Vivien Alcock, 79, English children's book writer.
- Sadateru Arikawa, 73, Japanese aikido teacher and shihan.
- Ivan Getting, 91, American physicist and electrical engineer.
- Tommy Hanlon Jr., 80, American-Australian actor, comedian, television host and circus ringmaster, cancer.
- John K. Mahon, 91, American historian.
- Jacques Mazoyer, 93, French Olympic sports shooter (1936, 1948, 1952, 1956).
- Lila Ram, 72, Indian wrestler and Olympian (1956).
- Peter Salmon, 74, Canadian swimmer and Olympian (1948, 1952).

=== 12 ===
- Jim Cairns, 89, Australian politician (Deputy Prime Minister, Treasurer of Australia).
- Ram Gopal, 90, Indian dancer and choreographer.
- Ruth Halbsguth, 86, German swimmer and Olympic silver medalist (1936).
- Elbert Bertram Haltom Jr., 80, American district judge (United States District Court for the Northern District of Alabama).
- Ion Ioanid, 77, Romanian dissident and writer.
- Arthur Kaye, 70, English football player.
- Joan Kroc, 75, American philanthropist, widow of McDonald's founder Ray Kroc, brain cancer.
- Pete Morisi, 75, American comic book writer and artist.
- Fathur Rahman al-Ghozi, 32, Indonesian Islamic terrorist and bomb-maker, shot by police.
- Bill Shoemaker, 72, American Hall of Fame jockey, rode the winners in eleven Triple Crown races.

=== 13 ===
- Butch Brickell, 46, American race car driver (24 Hours of Daytona) and stuntman (The Specialist, 2 Fast 2 Furious).
- Bertram Brockhouse, 85, Canadian physicist, 1994 Nobel Prize winner in physics for the development of neutron spectroscopy.
- Gheorghe Constantinide, 74, Romanian Olympic basketball player (1952).
- Clarita Heath, 87, American Olympic alpine skier (1936).
- Eino Lahti, 88, Finnish footballer and Olympian (1936).
- Eduard Prugovečki, 66, Romanian-Canadian physicist and mathematician.
- Anne Ziegler, 93, English singer, known for her duets with her husband Webster Booth.

=== 14 ===
- Mohamed Basri, 75-76, Moroccan activist and opposition leader, heart attack.
- Edward T. Breathitt, 78, American politician, 51st governor of Kentucky, ventricular fibrillation.
- Zoltan Crișan, 48, Romanian football player, tuberculosis.
- Wil Culmer, 45, Bahamian baseball player (Cleveland Indians).
- Moktar Ould Daddah, 78, President of Mauritania.
- Patrick Dalzel-Job, 90, British naval intelligence officer and commando.
- Jack McLean, 80, Canadian ice hockey player (Toronto Maple Leafs).
- Ben Metcalfe, 83, Greenpeace activist and co-founder, heart attack.
- Ramón Porcel, 81, Argentine Olympic rower (1948).
- Javier Portales, 66, Argentine actor, heart attack.
- Miloš Sádlo, 91, Czech cellist and music teacher.
- Knud Leif Thomsen, 79, Danish film director and screenwriter.

=== 15 ===
- Pierre Chanal, 56, Egyptian-French soldier and suspected serial killer, suicide by exsanguination.
- Norman Elder, 64, Canadian writer, artist, and Olympic equestrian (1960, 1968), suicide by hanging.
- Antonín Liška, 79, Czech Catholic theologist.
- Benny Lévy, 58, Egyptian-French philosopher, political activist and author.

=== 16 ===
- Avni Arbaş, Turkish artist, cancer.
- Lorraine Dunn, 61, Panamanian sprinter, hurdler, and Olympian (1960, 1964).
- Don Evans, 65, American playwright, theater director, and actor, heart attack.
- James M. Hanley, 83, American businessman and politician.
- Mark Hanna, 86, American screenwriter and actor.
- Stu Hart, 88, Canadian professional wrestler, stroke.
- László Papp, 77, Hungarian boxer and Olympian (1948, 1952, 1956).
- Ignatius Jerome Strecker, 85, American prelate of the Roman Catholic Church.
- Carl Urbano, 93, American animator and director.

=== 17 ===
- Bob Chow, 95, American Olympic sports shooter (1948).
- Rene Fortaleza, 48, Filipino boxer, executive and Olympian (1972).
- Nils Hjelmström, 88, Swedish Olympic ski jumper (1936).
- Charlie Justice, 79, American gridiron football player (Washington Redskins).
- Frank O'Flynn, 84, New Zealand politician.
- Janice Rule, 72, American actress, cerebral hemorrhage.
- António Dias Teixeira, 73, Portuguese football player and manager.

=== 18 ===
- William C. Cramer, 81, American attorney and politician, heart attack.
- Rodolfo Freude, 83, Argentine politician and close advisor of president Juan Perón.
- David Lodge, 82, English actor, cancer.
- Ralph Moffitt, 71, English golfer.
- Manuel Vázquez Montalbán, 64, Spanish novelist (Detective Carvalho saga), journalist and poet.
- Preston Smith, 91, American politician (40th governor of Texas from 1969 to 1973).

=== 19 ===
- Jaime Allende, 79, Spanish Olympic field hockey player (1948).
- Misha Asherov, 79, Israeli actor (The Hour of Truth) and theatre director.
- Sir Peter Berger, 78, British admiral (Amethyst Incident).
- Road Warrior Hawk, 46, American professional wrestler (WWF), heart attack.
- Harun bin Idris, 77, Malaysian politician and 8th Menteri Besar of Selangor.
- Alija Izetbegović, 78, Chairman of the Presidency of Bosnia and Herzegovina, cardiovascular disease.
- Margaret Elizabeth Murie, 101, American naturalist, writer, adventurer, and conservationist.
- Nello Pagani, 92, Italian Grand Prix motorcycle road racer and Formula One driver.
- Guy Rolfe, 91, British actor.
- Georgi Vladimov, 72, Soviet and Ukrainian dissident writer.

=== 20 ===
- František Balvín, 88, Czechoslovak Olympic cross-country skier (1948, 1952).
- Ernie Calverley, 79, American basketball player (Rhode Island, Providence Steamrollers) and coach.
- Jack Elam, 82, American actor (Once Upon a Time in the West, The Cannonball Run, Pat Garrett and Billy the Kid), heart attack.
- Donald G. Jackson, 60, American filmmaker, leukemia.
- Hal Lahar, 84, American football player (Chicago Bears, Buffalo Bisons/Bills) and coach.
- Ferry Mesman, 78, Dutch footballer.
- Miodrag Petrović Čkalja, 79, Serbian actor.

=== 21 ===
- Bob Beckus, 83, American Olympic triple jumper (1948).
- Fred Berry, 52, American actor, stroke.
- Ron Crews, 47, American football player (Cleveland Browns).
- Luis A. Ferré, 99, Puerto Rican industrialist and politician, respiratory failure.
- Louise Day Hicks, 87, American politician (Boston City Council, U.S. Representative for Massachusetts's 9th congress. dist.).
- André Lonlas, 93, French Olympic long-distance runner (1936).
- Sandy MacDonald, 99, Canadian Olympic sailor (1960, 1964).
- Tomáš Pospíchal, 67, Czech football player.
- Alfred Rose, 71, Indian Konkani singer, composer, and actor.
- Elliott Smith, 34, American musician, suicide by stabbing.
- Ismael Torres, 51, Argentine Olympic cyclist (1972).
- Arturo Warman, 66, Mexican anthropologist, author, and politician.

=== 22 ===
- Dee Andros, 79, American football player, coach (University of Idaho, Oregon State University) and athletic director.
- Ron Collier, 73, Canadian jazz trombonist, composer, and arranger.
- Santiago Massini, 89, Argentine fencer and Olympian (1952, 1956).
- Willem Meijer, 80, Dutch botanist and plant collector.
- Philippe Ragueneau, 85, French journalist and writer.
- Hans Ras, 77, Dutch linguist and professor of Javanese language and literature.
- Tony Renna, 26, American motor racer and IndyCar driver, racing accident.
- Miguel Ángel Burelli Rivas, 81, Venezuelan diplomat (Ambassador to the U.S., Foreign Minister of Venezuela), lung cancer.
- Lilia Torriani, 82, Italian Olympic gymnast (1948).

=== 23 ===
- Tony Capstick, 59, British actor, comedian, musician and broadcaster, aneurysm.
- Al Corwin, 76, American baseball player (New York Giants).
- Vlasta Depetrisová, 82, Czech table tennis player.
- Kevin Magee, 44, American basketball player (UC Irvine Anteaters, CB Zaragoza, Maccabi Tel Aviv B.C.), traffic collision.
- Soong Mei-ling, 105, Chinese political figure and wife of president Chiang Kai-shek.
- Sadao Sato, 54, Japanese Olympic wrestler (1972, 1976).
- Judah Segal, 91, British linguist.
- Hiroshi Yoshimura, 63, Japanese musician and composer, skin cancer.

=== 24 ===
- Rosie Nix Adams, 45, American singer and songwriter, daughter of June Carter Cash, carbon monoxide poisoning.
- József Apró, 82, Hungarian Olympic middle-distance runner (1952).
- Bob Bailey, 72, Canadian ice hockey player (Toronto Maple Leafs, Detroit Red Wings, Chicago Blackhawks).
- Franklin Green, 70, American sports shooter and Olympian (1964).
- Veikko Hakulinen, 78, Finnish cross-country skier, triple Olympic- and world champion (1952, 1956, 1960, 1964), traffic collision.
- Joanna Lee, 72, American writer, producer, director and actress, bone cancer.
- Half a Mill, 30, American rapper, suicide by gunshot.
- Carmen Pujals, 87, Argentine botanist.
- Richard H. Wasai, 70, American politician.

=== 25 ===
- Hemu Adhikari, 84, Indian cricketer.
- Pandurang Shastri Athavale, 83, Indian philosopher and social activist.
- Noreen Branson, 93, British political activist and historian of the Communist Party of Great Britain.
- John Hart Ely, 64, American legal scholar, cancer.
- Behram Kurşunoğlu, 81, Turkish physicist, heart attack.
- Richard Leibler, 89, American mathematician and cryptanalyst.
- Tadeusz Radwan, 58, Polish luger and Olympian (1968).
- Robert Strassburg, 88, American conductor, composer, and musicologist.
- Mario Vitale, 75, Italian film actor.

=== 26 ===
- Johnny Boyd, 77, American racecar driver, twelve Indianapolis 500-mile races from 1955 to 1966.
- Steve Death, 54, English football goalkeeper, cancer.
- Leonid Filatov, 56, Soviet and Russian actor, director and poet, pneumonia.
- François Guérin, 75, French film and television actor.
- Roy Harte, 79, American jazz drummer and record producer.
- Hans-Joachim Jabs, 85, German Luftwaffe officer during World War II.
- Elem Klimov, 70, Soviet and Russian film director, brain hypoxia.
- Roberto García Morillo, 92, Argentine composer, musicologist, music professor and music critic.
- Heinz Piontek, 77, German writer.
- Jürgen Simon, 65, German Olympic cyclist (1960).
- Carolyn Smith-Meyer, 68, American operatic soprano
- Viguen, 73, Iranian pop music singer ("Sultan of pop") and actor, cancer.
- Eli Williams, 86, American baseball player.

=== 27 ===
- John William Atkinson, 79, American psychologist.
- Hank Beenders, 87, Dutch-American basketball player (Providence Steamrollers, Philadelphia Warriors, Boston Celtics).
- Pete Gudauskas, 87, American football player (Cleveland Rams, Chicago Bears).
- Manoj Khanderia, 60, Indian poet and writer.
- Tarun Kumar, 72, Indian actor.
- K. R. Malkani, 81, Indian journalist, historian and politician.
- François Mautin, 96, French Olympic ice hockey player (1928).
- Rod Roddy, 66, American radio and television announcer, cancer.
- Walter Washington, 88, American civil servant and politician, first Mayor of the District of Columbia, kidney failure.
- Fred Whittingham, 64, American football player (Philadelphia Eagles, New Orleans Saints), complications from back surgery.

=== 28 ===
- Jean Carbonnier, 95, French jurist.
- Marie Maynard Daly, 82, American biochemist.
- Edward Hartwig, 94, Polish photographer.
- Pier Angelo Conti Manzini, 57, Italian Olympic rower (1968, 1972).
- Nora Ney, 81, Brazilian singer, chronic obstructive pulmonary disease.
- Joan Perucho, 82, Spanish novelist, poet, art critic, and judge.
- Alexander Raichev, 81, Bulgarian composer.
- Oliver Sain, 71, American musician and record producer, cancer.

=== 29 ===
- Gino Armano, 76, Italian football player.
- Hal Clement, 81, American author, diabetes.
- Franco Corelli, 82, Italian tenor, heart attack.
- Gerrie Deijkers, 56, Dutch football player, heart attack.
- Lloyd Arthur Eshbach, 93, American science fiction fan, publisher, writer, and minister.
- A. Carl Helmholz, 88, American nuclear physicist.
- Vern Pettigrew, 95, Canadian Olympic wrestler (1936).
- Jaime Castillo Velasco, 89, Chilean politician, pneumonia.

=== 30 ===
- Lynn S. Beedle, 85, American structural engineer.
- Carl Berner, 90, Danish rower and Olympian (1936).
- Franco Bonisolli, 65, Italian operatic tenor.
- Peter Buehning Sr., 73, German-born American handball player and coach.
- Ron Davies, 57, American songwriter and musician, heart attack.
- Abel Ehrlich, 88, Israeli composer.
- Aidyn Guseinov, 46, Azerbaijani chess player.
- Khosro Haghgosha, 55, Iranian Olympic cyclist (1972, 1976).
- Lillian Jackson, 84, American baseball player.
- Subhadra Joshi, 84, Indian freedom activist and politician.
- Börje Leander, 85, Swedish football player and Olympian (1948).
- Steve O'Rourke, 63, English music manager and racing driver, stroke.
- Stan Szukala, 85, American basketball player (DePaul Blue Demons, Chicago American Gears).
- Richard Clyde Taylor, 83, American philosopher.
- Michiel Dudok van Heel, 79, Dutch Olympic sailor (1952).

=== 31 ===
- Yorrie Evans, 80, Walsh weightlifter and Olympian (1952).
- Robert Guenette, 68, American screenwriter and film/television producer and director, brain tumor.
- August Hollenstein, 83, Swiss Olympic sports shooter (1952, 1960, 1964).
- Semmangudi Srinivasa Iyer, 95, Indian carnatic musician.
- José Juncosa, 81, Spanish football player and manager.
- Antonio Medina, 84, Spanish chess master.
- Richard Neustadt, 84, American academic and advisor to several presidents.
- Karel Paulus, 70, Czech Olympic volleyball player (1964).
- Yechiel Shemi, Israeli sculptor.
- Lindsay Weir, 95, New Zealand cricketer.

== Sources ==
- Liebman, Roy (2000). The Wampas Baby Stars: A Biographical Dictionary, 1922–1934. Jefferson, North Carolina: McFarland. ISBN 0-7864-0756-5.
