= Athletics at the 1948 Summer Olympics – Men's triple jump =

Men's triple jump at the Games of the XIV Olympiad
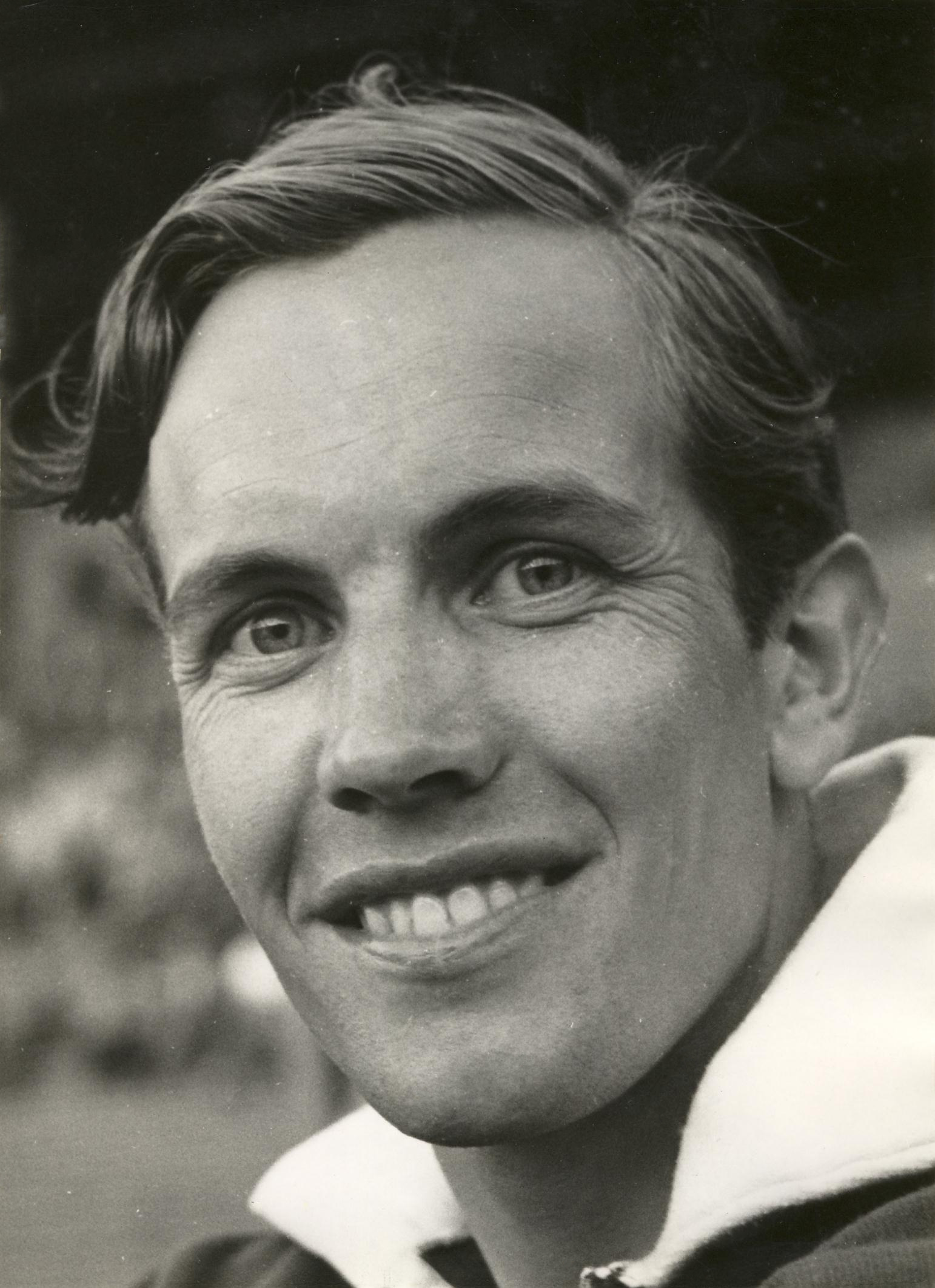
- Arne Åhman
- Venue: Wembley Stadium
- Dates: 3 August 1948 (qualifying and final)
- Competitors: 28 from 17 nations
- Winning distance: 15.400

Medalists
1st place, gold medalist(s)		Arne Åhman; Sweden
2nd place, silver medalist(s)		Gordon George Avery; Australia
3rd place, bronze medalist(s)		Ruhi Sarialp; Turkey

Video on YouTube Official Video @ 35:55

The men's triple jump event was part of the track and field athletics programme at the 1948 Summer Olympics. The competition was held on 3 August 1948. Twenty-eight athletes from 17 nations competed. The maximum number of athletes per nation had been set at 3 since the 1930 Olympic Congress. The final was won by Arne Åhman of Sweden. It was Sweden's first victory in the event since 1912, and first medal since 1932. Australia reached the podium for the second Games in a row (albeit twelve years apart) with Gordon George Avery's silver. Turkey received a medal in its first appearance in the triple jump with Ruhi Sarialp's bronze; it was the only track and field athletics medal won by Turkey in the 1900s.

== Background ==
This was the 11th appearance of the event, which is one of 12 athletics events to have been held at every Summer Olympics. There were no returning jumpers from the pre-war 1936 Games. Japan had been dominant in the event before World War II, but was no longer. Valle Rautio of Finland was closest to being a favorite, having won the 1946 European championships.

Brazil, Ceylon, South Korea, Peru, Portugal, and Turkey each made their first appearance in the event. The United States competed for the 11th time, having competed at each of the Games so far.

== Competition format ==
The competition used the two-round format introduced in 1936. In the qualifying round, each jumper received three attempts to reach the qualifying distance of 14.50 metres. Those who did advanced to the final round.

== Records ==
Prior to the competition, the existing World and Olympic records were as follows.

World record	Naoto Tajima (JPN)	16.00	Berlin, Germany	6 August 1936
Olympic record	Naoto Tajima (JPN)	16.00	Berlin, Germany	6 August 1936

No new world or Olympic records were set during the competition.

== Schedule ==
All times are British Summer Time (UTC+1)

Date	Time	Round
Tuesday, 3 August 1948	11:00; 15:30	Qualifying; Final

== Results ==
=== Qualifying ===
Qual. rule: qualification standard 14.50 m (Q) or at least best 12 qualified (q).

Rank	Athlete	Nation	Distance	Notes
1	George Avery	Australia	15.335	Q
2	Valle Rautio	Finland	14.860	Q
3	Åke Hallgren	Sweden	14.770	Q
4	Adhemar da Silva	Brazil	14.690	Q
5	Henry Rebello	India	14.650	Q
6	Hélio da Silva	Brazil	14.640	Q
7	Arne Åhman	Sweden	14.600	Q
7	Kim Won-kwon	South Korea	14.600	Q
9	Geraldo de Oliveira	Brazil	14.590	Q
10	Lennart Moberg	Sweden	14.570	Q
11	Les McKeand	Australia	14.550	Q
12	Bill Albans	United States	14.550	Q
13	Ruhi Sarıalp	Turkey	14.530	Q
14	Preben Larsen	Denmark	14.520	Q
15	Máximo Reyes	Peru	14.380	
16	Erkki Koutonen	United States	14.370	
17	João Vieira	Portugal	14.280	
18	Robert Bobin	France	14.130	
19	Bob Beckus	United States	14.030	
20	Charles Épalle	France	14.020	
21	Felix Würth	Austria	13.920	
22	Luís García	Portugal	13.920	
23	Carlos Vera	Chile	13.850	
24	Allan Lindsay	Great Britain	13.700	
25	Sidney Cross	Great Britain	13.455	
26–27	Robert Hawkey	Great Britain	Unknown	
26–27	Jorge Aguirre	Mexico	Unknown	
—	G. D. Peiris	Ceylon	No mark	
—	Stefán Sörensson	Iceland	DNS	
—	Charles Thompson	Guyana	DNS	

=== Final ===
Rank	Athlete	Nation	1	2	3	4	5	6	Distance
1st place, gold medalist(s)	Arne Åhman	Sweden	15.400	14.680	14.890	14.580	X	X	15.400
2nd place, silver medalist(s)	George Avery	Australia	15.365	X	14.670	14.320	14.780	—	15.365
3rd place, bronze medalist(s)	Ruhi Sarıalp	Turkey	14.230	15.020	14.910	15.025	X	—	15.025
4	Preben Larsen	Denmark	Unknown						14.830
5	Geraldo de Oliveira	Brazil	Unknown						14.825
6	Valle Rautio	Finland	Unknown						14.700
7	Les McKeand	Australia	Unknown						14.530
8	Adhemar da Silva	Brazil	Unknown						14.490
9	Åke Hallgren	Sweden	Unknown						14.485
10	Bill Albans	United States	Unknown						14.330
11	Hélio da Silva	Brazil	Unknown						14.310
12	Kim Won-Gwon	South Korea	Unknown						14.250
13	Lennart Moberg	Sweden	Unknown						14.215
—	Henry Rebello	India	X	X	X	X	X	X	No mark

== Sources ==
- Organising Committee for the XIV Olympiad, The (1948). "The Official Report of the Organising Committee for the XIV Olympiad" (PDF). LA84 Foundation. Archived from the original (PDF) on September 27, 2013.
