= 1954 European Athletics Championships – Men's triple jump =

1954 Championships

Men's triple jump at the European Athletics Championships

The men's triple jump at the 1954 European Athletics Championships was held in Bern, Switzerland, at Stadion Neufeld on 25 and 26 August 1954.

== Medalists ==
Gold	Leonid Shcherbakov; Soviet Union
Silver	Roger Norman; Sweden
Bronze	Martin Řehák; Czechoslovakia

== Results ==
=== Final ===
26 August

Rank	Name	Nationality	Result	Notes
1st place, gold medalist(s)	Leonid Shcherbakov	Soviet Union	15.90	CR
2nd place, silver medalist(s)	Roger Norman	Sweden	15.17	
3rd place, bronze medalist(s)	Martin Řehák	Czechoslovakia	15.10	
4	Zygfryd Weinberg	Poland	14.91	
5	Fritz Portmann	Switzerland	14.81	
6	Kari Rahkamo	Finland	14.73	
7	Jerzy Gizelewski	Poland	14.20	
8	Theo Strohschnieder	West Germany	14.15	
9	Rui Ramos	Portugal	13.97	

=== Qualification ===
25 August

Rank	Name	Nationality	Result	Notes
1	Kari Rahkamo	Finland	15.06	Q
2	Fritz Portmann	Switzerland	14.86	Q
3	Martin Řehák	Czechoslovakia	14.84	Q
4	Leonid Shcherbakov	Soviet Union	14.79	Q
5	Roger Norman	Sweden	14.67	Q
6	Zygfryd Weinberg	Poland	14.67	Q
7	Theo Strohschnieder	West Germany	14.66	Q
8	Jerzy Gizelewski	Poland	14.62	Q
9	Rui Ramos	Portugal	14.56	Q
10	Rade Radovanović	Yugoslavia	14.42	
11	István Bolyki	Hungary	14.42	
12	Erwin Müller	Switzerland	14.34	
13	Tapio Lehto	Finland	14.30	
14	Ioan Sorin	Romania	14.29	
15	Ferhan Devekuşuoğlu	Turkey	14.18	
16	Virgil Zavadescu	Romania	14.16	
17	Vilhjálmur Einarsson	Iceland	14.10	
18	Pierre Thiolon	France	14.05	
19	Walter Herssens	Belgium	13.97	
20	Jacques Boulanger	France	13.91	
21	Herbert Pfeffer	West Germany	13.90	
	Vasiliy Dementyev	Soviet Union	NM	

== Participation ==
According to an unofficial count, 22 athletes from 15 countries participated in the event.

- Belgium (1)
- Czechoslovakia (1)
- Finland (2)
- France (2)
- Hungary (1)
- Iceland (1)
- Poland (2)
- Portugal (1)
- Romania (2)
- Soviet Union (2)
- Sweden (1)
- Switzerland (2)
- Turkey (1)
- West Germany (2)
- Yugoslavia (1)
