= Sonck =

Sonck or Sønck is the surname of the following people:

- Grethe Sønck (1929–2010), Danish actress and singer
- Hannes Sonck (1919–1952), Finnish athlete
- Helga Sonck-Majewski (1916–2015), Finnish artist
- Lars Sonck (1870–1956), Finnish architect
- Martinus Sonck (ca. 1590–1625), first Dutch Governor of Formosa
- Wesley Sonck (born 1978), Belgian football player
