= 1946 European Athletics Championships – Men's triple jump =

Men's triple jump at the European Athletics Championships

The men's triple jump at the 1946 European Athletics Championships was held in Oslo, Norway, at Bislett Stadium on 22 August 1946.

== Medalists ==
Gold	Valdemar Rautio; Finland
Silver	Bertil Johnsson; Sweden
Bronze	Arne Åhman; Sweden

== Results ==
=== Final ===
22 August

Rank	Name	Nationality	Result	Notes
1st place, gold medalist(s)	Valdemar Rautio	Finland	15.17	
2nd place, silver medalist(s)	Bertil Johnsson	Sweden	15.15	
3rd place, bronze medalist(s)	Arne Åhman	Sweden	14.96	
4	Eugen Haugland	Norway	14.70	
5	Hannes Sonck	Finland	14.70	
6	Preben Larsen	Denmark	14.65	
7	Stefán Sörensson	Iceland	14.11	NR
8	Miroslav Řihošek	Czechoslovakia	13.77	
9	Denis Watts	Great Britain	13.49	

== Participation ==
According to an unofficial count, 9 athletes from 7 countries participated in the event.

- Czechoslovakia (1)
- Denmark (1)
- Finland (2)
- Iceland (1)
- Norway (1)
- Sweden (2)
- Great Britain (1)
