= Allan Lindsay =

British triple jumper

Personal information
- Nationality: British (Scottish)
- Born: 5 March 1926 Shotts, Scotland
- Died: 2 April 2014 (aged 88) Norwich, England

Sport
- Sport: Athletics
- Event: Triple jump
- Club: University of St Andrews AC; Shotts AC

Allan Shanks Lindsay (5 March 1926 – 2 April 2014) was a British athlete who competed at the 1948 Summer Olympics.

== Biography ==
Lindsay was educated at the University of St Andrews and while studying to be a doctor competed for Shotts AC, and with them he won the 1947 and 1948 Scottish triple jump titles.

Lindsay finished second behind Gordon George Avery in the triple jump event at the 1948 AAA Championships but by virtue of being the highest placed British athlete was considered the British triple jump champion.

Shortly afterwards he represented the Great Britain team at the 1948 Olympic Games in London, where he participated in the men's triple jump competition.

Lindsay represented the Scottish athletics team at the 1950 British Empire Games in Auckland, New Zealand and as a member of the Atalanta AC, he could only finish eighth. Later, Lindsay became a triple jump coach.
