= Spycher =

Spycher is a Swiss surname. Notable people with the surname include:

- Christoph Spycher (born 1978), Swiss football left-back
- Tim Spycher (born 2004), Swiss football goalkeeper
- Werner Spycher (1916-1995), Swiss wrestler
