= Mitsuzō =

- Gender: Male

Origin
- Origin: Japanese
- Meaning: Different meanings depending on the kanji used

Mitsuzō, Mitsuzo or Mitsuzou (written: 光三 or 味津三) is a masculine Japanese given name. Notable people with the name include:

- Mitsuzo Mizutani (水谷 光三; 1915–?), Japanese sport wrestler
- Mitsuzo Sasaki (佐々木 味津三; 1896–1934), Japanese writer
