= Walter Ashbaugh =

American track & field athlete and basketball player

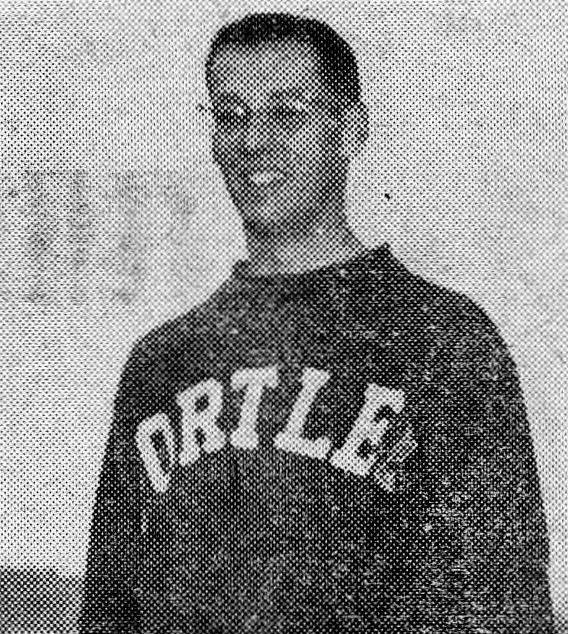
Ashbaugh, circa 1952

Walter Stuart "Walt" Ashbaugh (March 11, 1929, in East Liverpool, Ohio – April 3, 2003, in Toledo, Ohio) was an American track and field athlete and basketball player.

== Athletic career ==
Running for Cornell University, he competed in the 120 yard high hurdles in which he held the school record. He was also a pivotman on the basketball team, during their most successful 1950–1 season with a 20–5 record.

He competed in the triple jump at the 1952 Olympics, finishing fourth. His second round jump of 15.39 m (50 ft 5 3/4 in) put him into the bronze medal position until Soviet Leonid Shcherbakov leaped into silver medal position, pushing Ashbaugh off the podiumm. Earlier that year, he was also the National Champion in the event, breaking Gay Bryan's 4-year streak.
