= Mizutani =

Mizutani is a Japanese surname. Notable people with the surname include:

- Fukashi Mizutani (不可 思; born 1991), stage name Fukashi (ふかし), Japanese kickboxer
- Jun Mizutani (水谷 隼; born 1989), table tennis player
- Kazuo Mizutani (水谷 一生; 1899–1949), military personnel of World War II
- Kei Mizutani (水谷 ケイ; born 1974), adult film actress
- Masatoshi Mizutani (水谷 允俊; born 1987), football player
- Mitsuzo Mizutani (水谷 光三; 1915–?), Japanese sport wrestler
- Ruri Mizutani (水谷 光里; born 1990), Japanese singer, member of Bon-Bon Blanco
- Takashi Mizutani (水谷 孝; 1948-2018), lead singer of Les Rallizes Dénudés
- Takuma Mizutani (水谷 拓磨; born 1996), Japanese footballer
- Yaeko Mizutani (水谷 八重子; 1905–1979), Japanese actress
- Yuichi Mizutani (水谷 雄一; born 1980), football player
- Yūko Mizutani (水谷 優子; 1964-2016), voice actress
- Yutaka Mizutani (水谷 豊; born 1952), actor and singer

== See also ==
- 8947 Mizutani, a main-belt asteroid
