= João Vieira =

João Vieira may refer to:

- João Vieira (island), an island of the Bijagós archipelago (Guinea-Bissau)
- João Vieira (triple jumper) (born 1919), Portuguese triple jumper
- João Bernardo Vieira (1939–2009), Guinea-Bissau general and president
- João Bernardo Vieira II (born 1977), Guinea-Bissau politician
- João Vieira (racewalker) (born 1976), Portuguese race walker
- João Vieira (footballer, born 1991), Portuguese footballer
- João Vieira (footballer, born 1997), Brazilian footballer
