= Kvaček =

Kvaček or Kvacek is a Czech surname and can refer to:

- Jiří Kvaček, Czech botanist
- Karel Kváček (1912–1986), Czech wrestler
- Milan Kvaček, Czech researcher, Institute of Ore Research, Kutna Hora
- Milouš Kvaček (1933–2010), Czechoslovak professional football player
- Robert Kvaček (1932–2024), Czech historian
- Zlatko Kvaček (1937-2020), Czech palaeobotanist
