= Tadashi Yamamoto (athlete) =

Japanese athlete

Personal information
- Nationality: Japanese
- Born: 25 November 1925
- Died: 28 July 1998 (aged 72)

Sport
- Sport: Athletics
- Event: Triple jump

Tadashi Yamamoto (Japanese: 山本 忠司, Hepburn: Yamamoto Tadashi; 25 November 1925 – 28 July 1998) was a Japanese athlete and architect. He competed in the men's triple jump at the 1952 Summer Olympics. He later became a prominent architect.
