= Eugénio Lopes =

Portuguese triple jumper

Personal information
- Full name: Eugénio de Carvalho Lopes
- Nationality: Portuguese
- Born: 22 January 1929 Porto, Portugal

Sport
- Sport: Athletics
- Event: Triple jump

Eugénio Lopes (born 22 January 1929) is a Portuguese athlete. He competed in the men's triple jump at the 1952 Summer Olympics.
