= Erkki Koutonen =

American triple jumper

Personal information
- Nationality: American
- Born: March 25, 1926
- Died: December 15, 1986 (aged 60)

Sport
- Sport: Athletics
- Event: Triple jump

Erkki Koutonen (March 25, 1926 – December 15, 1986) was an American athlete. He competed in the men's triple jump at the 1948 Summer Olympics.
