= Varney, Ontario =

Human settlement in Ontario, Canada

Coordinates: 44°7′58″N 80°48′38″W

Varney is a small community in Grey County, Ontario, Canada. Varney is located on Highway 6, about 5 kilometers south of Durham and 19 kilometers north of Mount Forest.

John Vernon Pettigrew, men's featherweight wrestler (1936 Olympic Summer games), was born in Varney, in 1908.

== Attractions ==
Varney International Speedway is a 1/4 mile high banked short track motor racing oval, located south of the village. The track hosts a weekly Saturday night stock car racing program that runs from May to September each year.

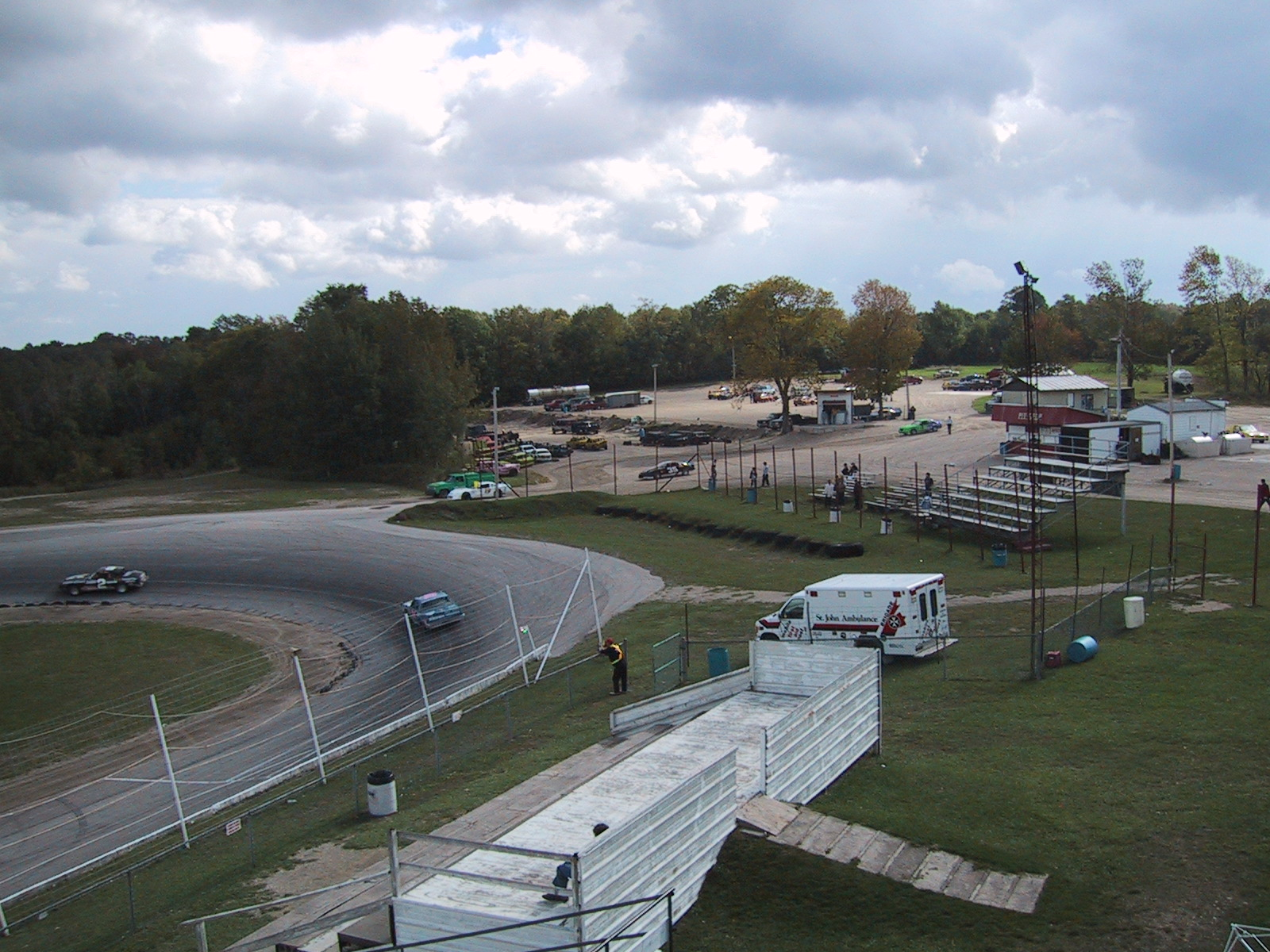
Turn #1 & #2 and Pit lane at Varney International Speedway

In the north end of the town, easily visible from the road, is the World's Largest Adirondack chair.

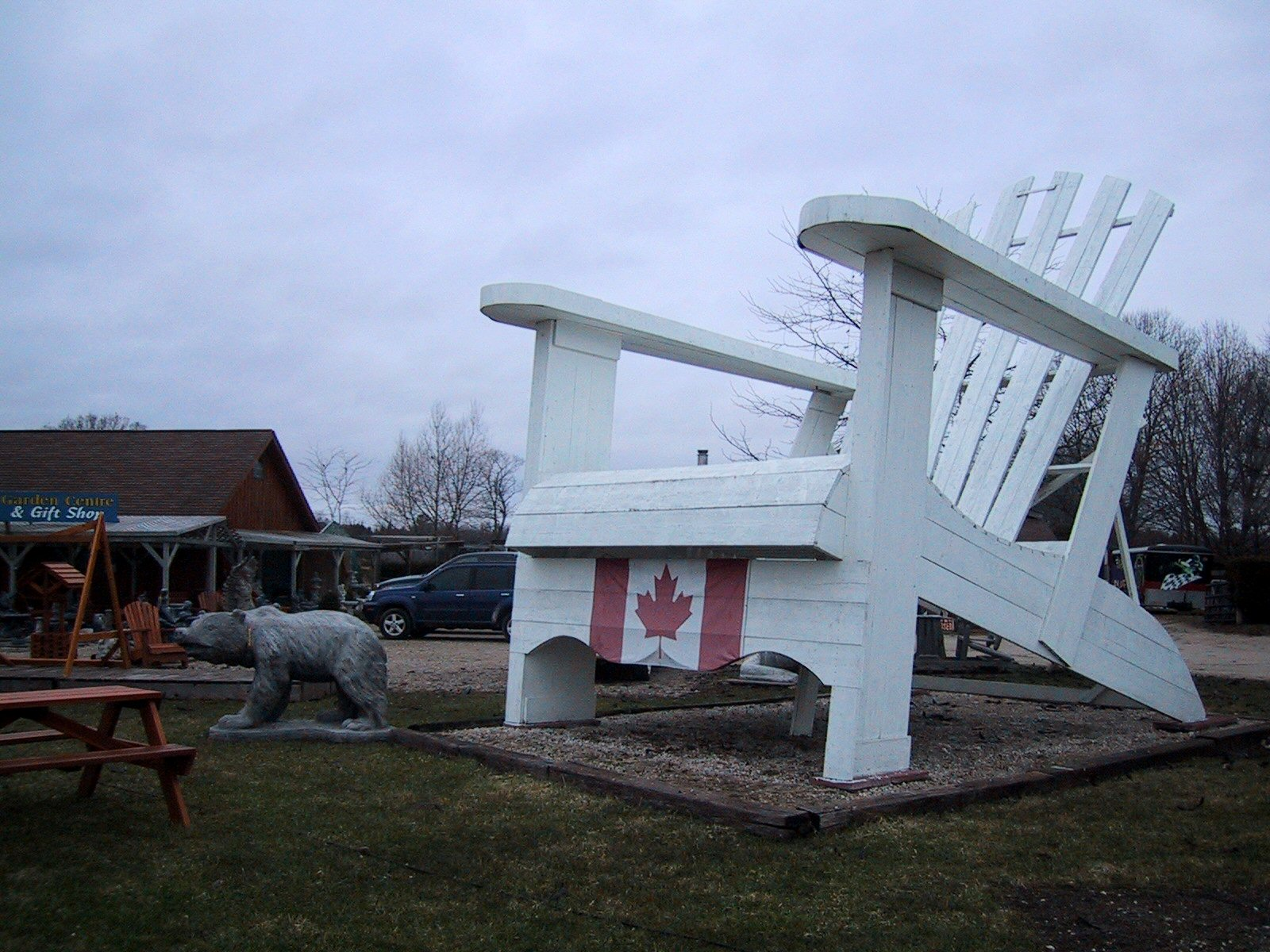
The Largest Adirondack Chair in the World

== See also ==
- List of unincorporated communities in Ontario
