= Jim Gerhardt =

American triple jumper (1929–2021)

Personal information
- Born: March 2, 1929 San Antonio, Texas, U.S.
- Died: November 29, 2021 (aged 92) Houston, Texas, U.S.

Sport
- Sport: Athletics
- Event: Triple jump

Jim Gerhardt (March 2, 1929 – November 29, 2021) was an American athlete. He competed in the men's triple jump at the 1952 Summer Olympics. Gerhardt died in Houston on November 29, 2021, at the age of 92.
