= Hector Riské =

Belgian wrestler

Personal information
- Nationality: Belgian
- Born: 29 July 1910 Temse, Belgium
- Died: 21 December 1984 (aged 74) Temse, Belgium
- Relative: Jeroom Riske (brother)

Sport
- Sport: Wrestling

Hector Riské (29 July 1910 – 21 December 1984) was a Belgian wrestler. He competed in the men's freestyle featherweight at the 1936 Summer Olympics.
