= Charles Épalle =

French triple jumper

Personal information
- Nationality: French
- Born: 8 March 1924
- Died: 24 April 2008 (aged 84)

Sport
- Sport: Athletics
- Event: Triple jump

Charles Épalle (8 March 1924 – 24 April 2008) was a French athlete. He competed in the men's triple jump at the 1948 Summer Olympics.
