= Nevil Hall =

South African wrestler

Personal information
- Nationality: South African
- Born: 19 October 1915 Cape Town, South Africa
- Died: 9 July 1987 (aged 71) Pretoria, South Africa

Sport
- Sport: Wrestling

Nevil Hall (19 October 1915 – 9 July 1987) was a South African wrestler. He competed in the men's freestyle featherweight at the 1936 Summer Olympics.
