= Henry Rebello =

Indian triple jumper

Personal information
- Nationality: Indian
- Born: Henry Malcolm Rebello; 17 November 1928 Lucknow, British India
- Died: 27 August 2013 (aged 84) Gurgaon, India

Sport
- Sport: Triple jump
- Event: 1948 London Olympics: Men's triple jump

Henry Malcolm Rebello (17 November 1928 – 27 August 2013) was an Indian triple jumper. He competed in India's first independent Olympic appearance in 1948 in London. He retired as a Group Captain in 1980 from the Indian Air Force.

Rebello died on 27 August 2013, at age 84, following a lengthy illness.
