= Vasilios Sakellarakis =

Greek triple jumper

Personal information
- Nationality: Greek
- Born: 2 April 1933 Athens, Greece
- Died: 14 March 2018 (aged 84)

Sport
- Sport: Athletics
- Event: Triple jump

Vasilios Sakellarakis (2 April 1933 – 14 March 2018) was a Greek athlete. He competed in the men's triple jump at the 1952 Summer Olympics.
