= Hrubá Vrbka =

- Municipality
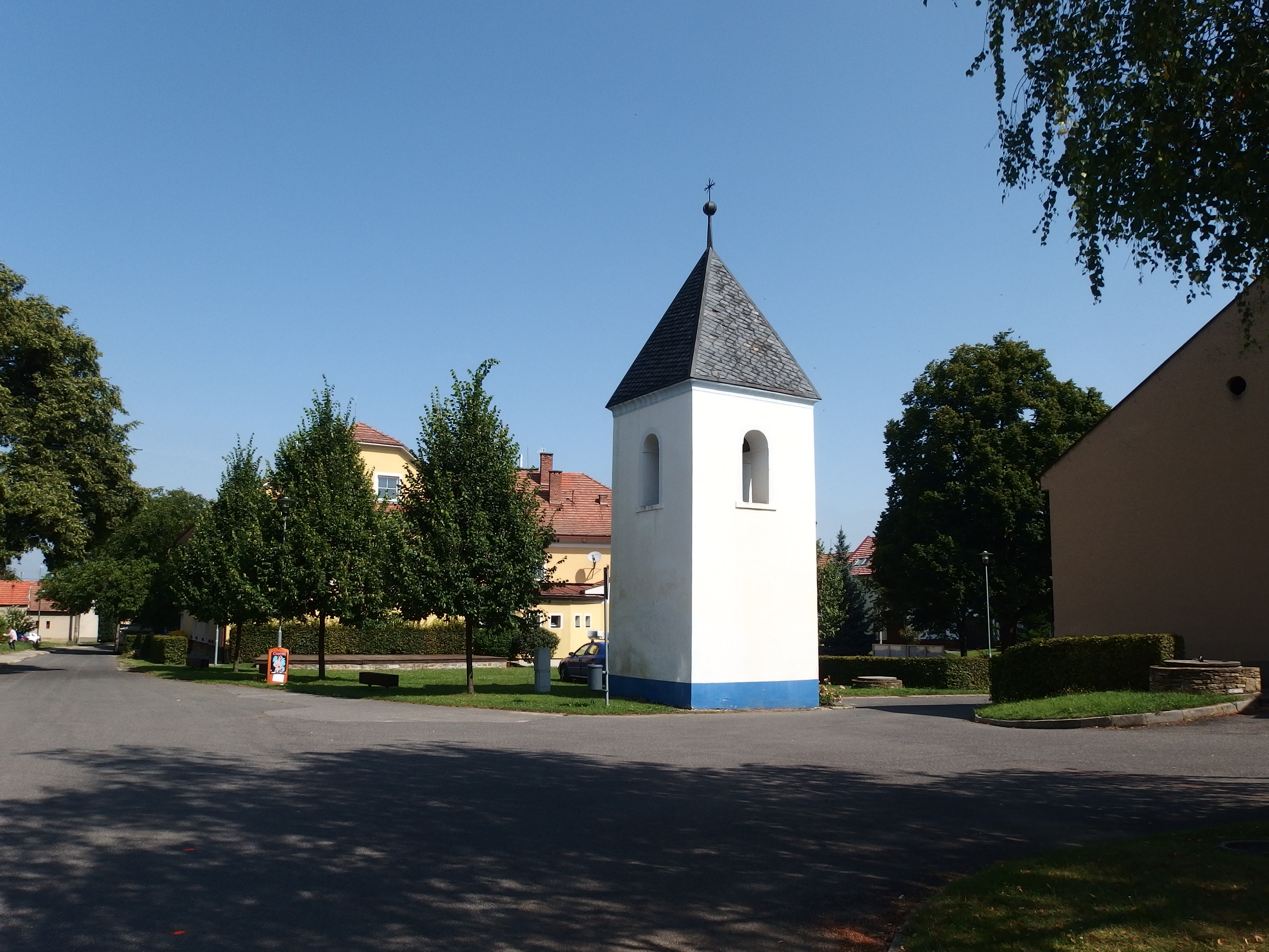
- Common with a belfry

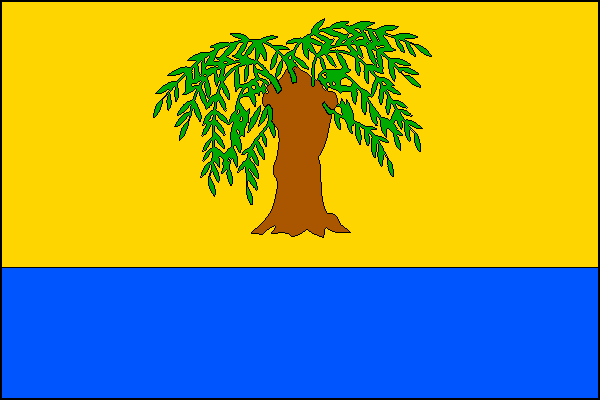
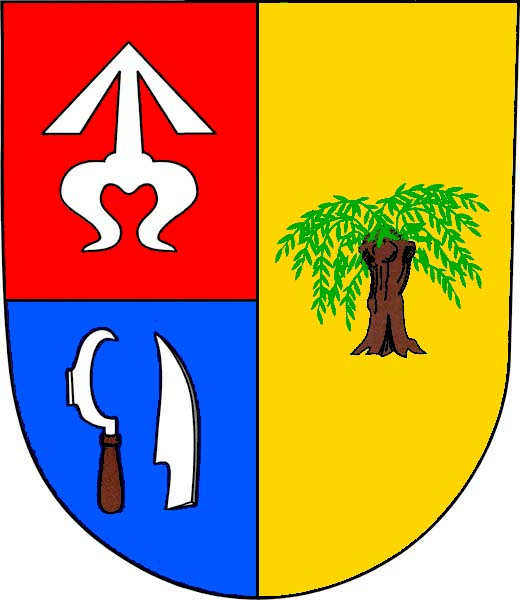
- Flag Coat of arms

- Location in the Czech Republic
- Coordinates: 48°52′19″N 17°28′37″E
- Country: Czech Republic
- Region: South Moravian
- District: Hodonín
- First mentioned: 1360

Area
  - Total: 13.18 km^{2} (5.09 sq mi)
- Elevation: 257 m (843 ft)

Population (2026-01-01)
  - Total: 601
  - Density: 45.6/km^{2} (118/sq mi)
- Time zone: UTC+1 (CET)
  - Summer (DST): UTC+2 (CEST)
- Postal code: 696 73
- Website: www.hrubavrbka.cz

Hrubá Vrbka (German: Gross Wrbka) is a municipality and village in Hodonín District in the South Moravian Region of the Czech Republic. It has about 600 inhabitants.

Hrubá Vrbka, a part of traditional ethnographic region Horňácko, lies approximately 25 kilometres (16 mi) east of Hodonín, 73 km (45 mi) south-east of Brno, and 259 km (161 mi) south-east of Prague.

== History ==
The first written mention of Hrubá Vrbka (initially called Velká Vrbka or just Vrbka) is from 1242. Soon after, the village became part of the Strážnice estate and shared its owners.

== Demographics ==
Historical population
Year	Pop.	±%
1869	731	—
1880	829	+13.4%
1890	853	+2.9%
1900	863	+1.2%
1910	901	+4.4%
1921	974	+8.1%
1930	988	+1.4%
1950	911	−7.8%
1961	952	+4.5%
1970	888	−6.7%
1980	805	−9.3%
1991	762	−5.3%
2001	719	−5.6%
2011	626	−12.9%
2021	569	−9.1%
Source: Censuses

== Notable people ==
- Gorazd Pavlík (1879–1942), bishop and saint
- Martin Řehák (1933–2010), athlete
