= Willi Burgard =

German triple jumper

Personal information
- Nationality: German
- Born: 14 March 1927 Wiebelskirchen, Germany
- Died: 23 October 2000 (aged 73) Bexbach, Saarland, Germany

Sport
- Sport: Athletics
- Event: Triple jump
- Club: Borussia Neunkirchen

Wilhelm Johann Burgard (14 March 1927 – 23 October 2000) was a German athlete. He competed in the men's triple jump at the 1952 Summer Olympics, representing Saar.

Burgard won the British AAA Championships title in the triple jump event at the British 1952 AAA Championships.
