= Zygfryd Weinberg =

Polish triple jumper

Personal information
- Full name: Zygfryd Joachim Weinberg
- Nationality: Polish
- Born: 3 February 1930 Bydgoszcz, Poland
- Died: 5 August 2015 (aged 85)
- Height: 1.79 m (5 ft 10 in)
- Weight: 71 kg (157 lb)

Sport
- Sport: Athletics
- Event: Triple jump
- Club: Polonia Bydgoszcz

Zygfryd Joachim Weinberg (3 February 1930 – 5 August 2015) was a Polish athlete. He competed in the men's triple jump at the 1952 Summer Olympics.

== International competitions ==
Year	Competition	Venue	Position	Event	Notes
Representing Poland
1951	World Festival of Youth and Students	East Berlin, East Germany	3rd	Triple jump	14.59 m
1952	Olympic Games	Helsinki, Finland	10th	Triple jump	14.76 m
1953	World Festival of Youth and Students	Bucharest, Romania	6th	Triple jump	14.68 m
1954	World Student Games	Budapest, Hungary	1st	Triple jump	15.30 m
1954	European Championships	Bern, Switzerland	4th	Triple jump	14.91 m

== Personal bests ==
- Triple jump – 15.30 (Budapest 1954)
