= Norman Morrell =

British wrestler (1912–2000)

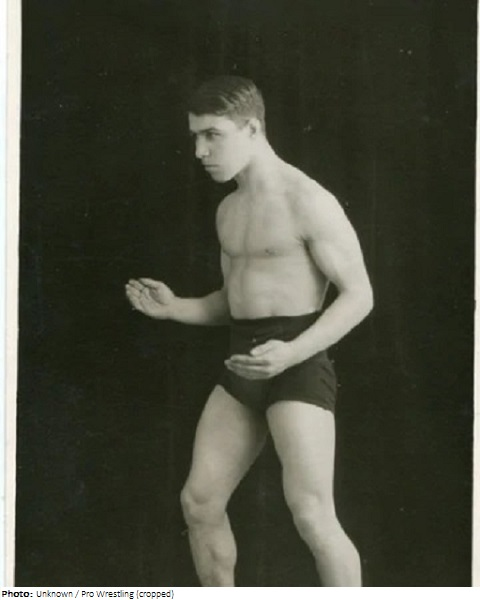

Personal information
- National team: United Kingdom
- Born: 17 July 1912 Bradford, England
- Died: 21 December 2000 (aged 88) Bradford, England
- Height: 173 cm (5 ft 8 in)

Sport
- Sport: Wrestling
- Weight class: Featherweight
- Club: Manningham All Round Sports Club
Medal record
Men's freestyle wrestling
Representing England
British Championships
Gold medal – first place	1933	Featherweight
Gold medal – first place	1934	Featherweight
Gold medal – first place	1935	Featherweight
Gold medal – first place	1936	Featherweight

Norman Morrell (17 July 1912 – 21 December 2000) was a British wrestler. He competed at the 1936 Summer Olympics in both freestyle and Greco-Roman wrestling. Morrell was a four-time British freestyle wrestling champion, having won the featherweight (63 kg/139 lb) division from 1933 to 1936. He also won national championships in Cumberland and Westmorland wrestling.

Morrell became a pro wrestler sometime after the 1936 Olympics. He grew to dislike the disorganised and scandalous state of pro wrestling at the time and became a promoter and trainer in the early 1940s. In October 1943, Morrell arranged a meeting that led to the formation of the British Wrestling Federation (BWF). Although described as a trade union, it intended to promote its own tournaments and champions. After the war, Morrell wrote a ruleset that would become Mountevans rules, comparable to Queensberry Rules in boxing. Partnering with Edward Evans, 1st Baron Mountevans to legitimise pro wrestling, Mountevans champions were established, comparable to the Lonsdale Belt. Morrell was a leading member of Joint Promotions and trained wrestlers at his gym in Bradford including George Kidd. He engaged in public disputes in defense of pro wrestling with Atholl Oakeley and Don Branch. Oakeley publicly apologised after a legal dispute with Morrell. Branch, previously a wrestler and referee for Morrell, orchestrated a public exposé of pro wrestling but left the country after Morrell's aggressive rebuttals and a public challenge.

Morrell died at his home on 21 December 2000, at the age of 88.
