= William Laing (athlete) =

Ghanaian triple jumper (1929-1997)

Personal information
- Nationality: Ghanaian
- Born: 3 January 1929 Ghana
- Died: 19 January 1997 (aged 68) Kumasi, Ghana

Sport
- Sport: Athletics
- Event: Triple jump
- Club: University of St Andrews

William Neizer Laing (3 January 1929 – 19 January 1997) was a Ghanaian athlete. He competed in the men's triple jump at the 1952 Summer Olympics.

Laing finished second behind Sidney Cross in the triple jump event at the British 1950 AAA Championships and second behind Ken Wilmshurst at the 1953 AAA Championships.
