= Stanisław Kowal =

Polish triple jumper

Personal information
- Full name: Stanisław Zygmunt Kowal
- Nationality: Polish
- Born: 2 May 1928 Kielce, Poland
- Died: 28 November 2001 (aged 73) Warsaw, Poland
- Height: 1.75 m (5 ft 9 in)
- Weight: 74 kg (163 lb)

Sport
- Sport: Athletics
- Event: Triple jump
- Club: HKS Lechia Kielce (1948); Ogniwo Warsaw (1949–1954); Spójnia Warsaw (1955); Sparta Warsaw (1956–1958)

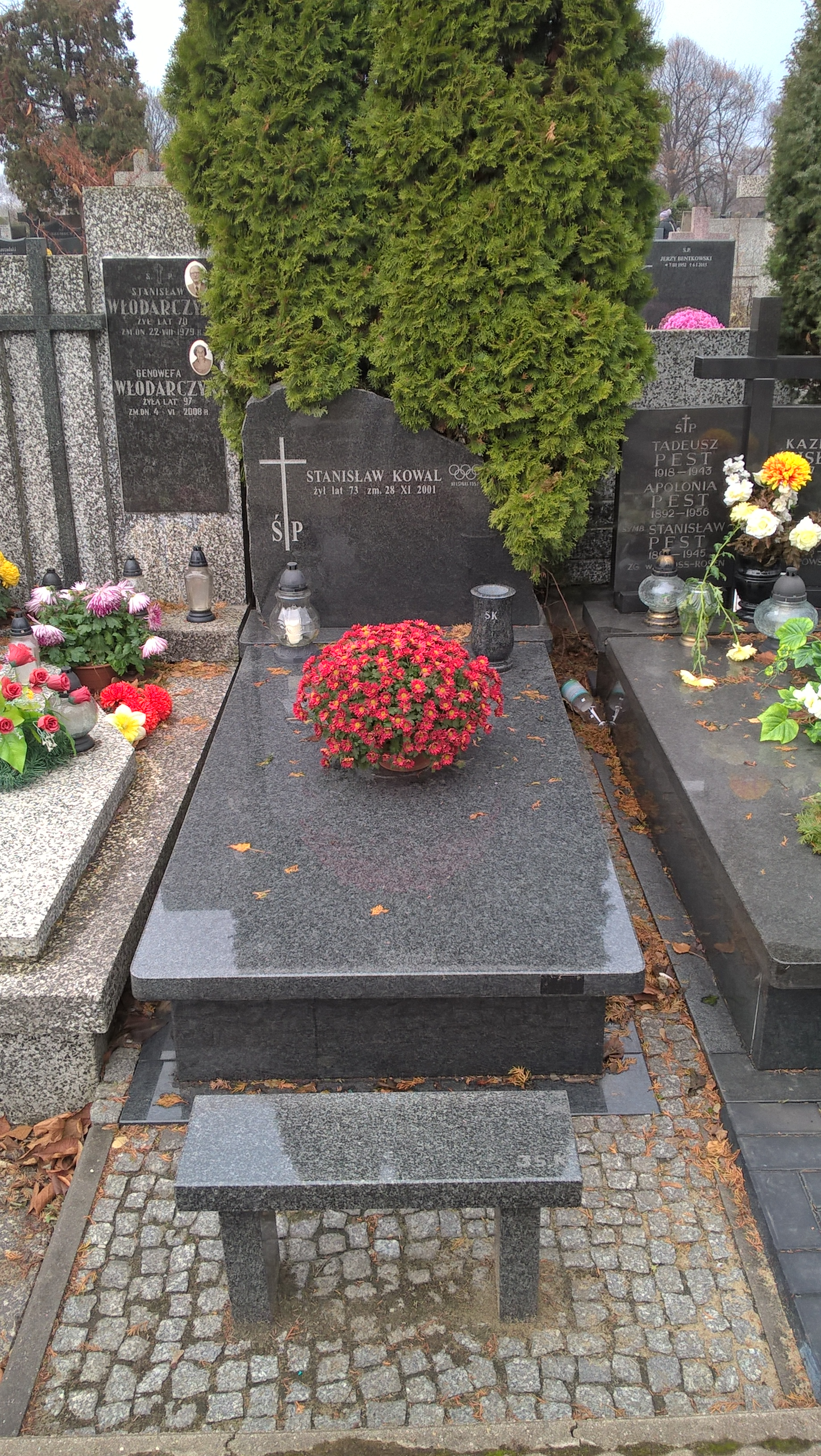
Grave of Stanisław Kowal at Bródno Cemetery in Warsaw

Stanisław Zygmunt Kowal (2 May 1928 – 28 November 2001) was a Polish athlete. He competed in the men's triple jump at the 1952 Summer Olympics. Kowal graduated from economics at the Warsaw School of Economics, and worked many year in international trade. For his athletics achievements, he was awarded the Silver Cross of Merit.

== International competitions ==
Year	Competition	Venue	Position	Event	Notes
Representing Poland
1952	Olympic Games	Helsinki, Finland	28th (q)	Triple jump	14.03 m

In addition, he represented Poland at 8 international matches without individual wins.

== Personal bests ==
- Long jump – 6.86 (Warsaw 1956)
- Triple jump – 15.23 (Poznań 1955)
