= Martin Řehák =

Czech athlete

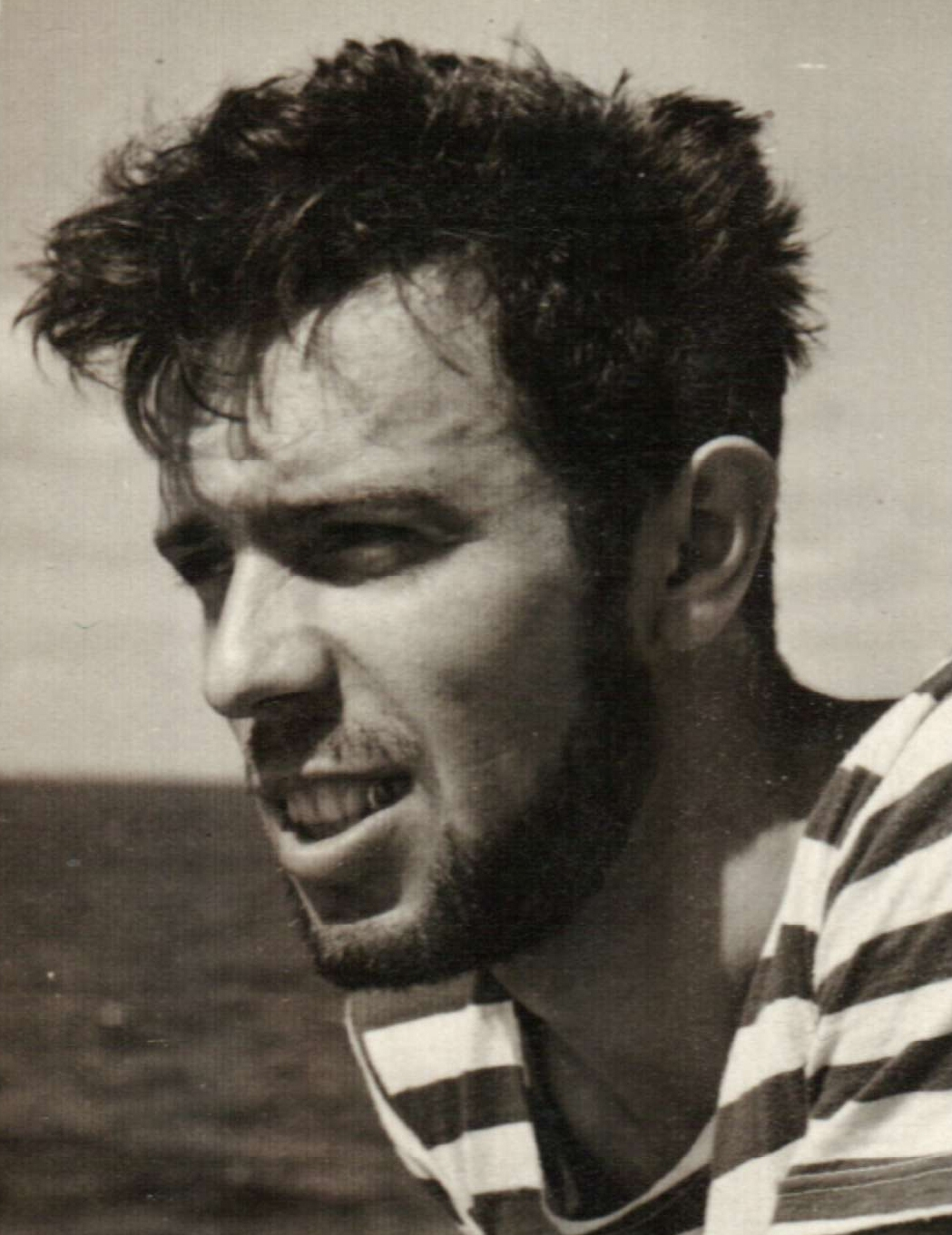
- Martin Řehák at the 1956 Summer Olympics

Personal information
- Nationality: Czech
- Born: 20 August 1933 Hrubá Vrbka, Czechoslovakia
- Died: 20 March 2010 (aged 76) Prague, Czech Republic

Sport
- Sport: Athletics
- Event: Triple jump
Medal record
Men's athletics
Representing Czechoslovakia
European Championships
Bronze medal – third place	1954 Bern	Triple jump

Martin Řehák (20 August 1933 – 20 March 2010) was a Czech athlete. He competed in the men's triple jump at the 1956 Summer Olympics.

He was born on 20 August 1933 in Hrubá Vrbka.
