= Bertil Johnsson =

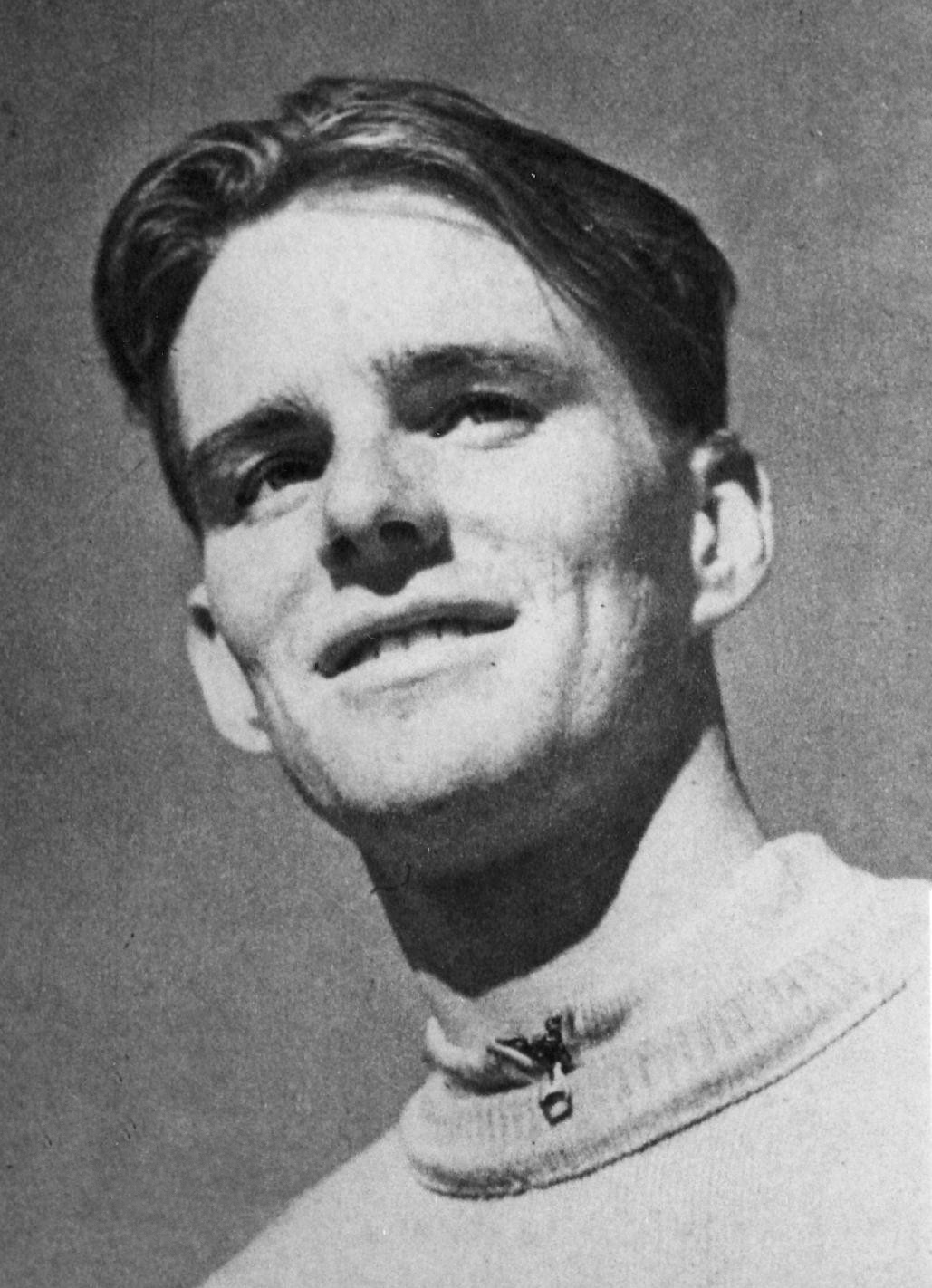

Personal information
- Born: 23 December 1915
- Died: 2010 (aged 94)

Sport
- Sport: Athletics
- Event(s): Triple jump, long jump
- Club: IK Vikingen

Achievements and titles
- Personal best(s): TJ – 15.27 m (1945); LJ – 7.40 m (1946)
Medal record
Men's athletics
Representing Sweden
European Championships
Silver medal – second place	1946 Oslo	Triple jump

Bertil Johnsson (23 December 1915 – 2010) was a leading Swedish long and triple jumper of the 1940s. He had his best results in the triple jump, in which he won the national title in 1943 and a silver medal at the 1946 European Athletics Championships.
