= Gordon George Avery =

Australian triple jumper (1925–2006)

George Avery
Personal information
- Nationality: Australian
- Born: 11 February 1925 Moree, New South Wales, Australia
- Died: 22 September 2006 (aged 81) Woonona, New South Wales, Australia

Sport
- Sport: Athletics
- Event: long jump/triple jump
- Club: Botany Harriers, Sydney
Medal record
Representing Australia
athletics
Olympic Games
Silver medal – second place	1948 London	Triple jump

Gordon George Avery, known as George Avery, (11 February 1925 – 22 September 2006) was an Australian athlete who mainly competed in the men's triple jump event and competed at the 1948 Summer Olympics.

== Biography ==
Avery was born in Moree, New South Wales.

Avery competed for Australia in the 1948 Summer Olympics held in London, Great Britain in the triple jump where he won the silver medal. At the time of competing in the 1948 Summer Olympics, was employed as a Constable with the New South Wales Police Force.

Avery won the British AAA Championships title in the triple jump event at the 1948 AAA Championships.

He died in Woonona, New South Wales.
