= Keizo Hasegawa =

Japanese triple jumper

Personal information
- Nationality: Japanese
- Born: 17 July 1922
- Died: 6 May 1999 (aged 76)

Sport
- Sport: Athletics
- Event: Triple jump

Keizo Hasegawa (長谷川 敬三, Hasegawa Keizō; 17 July 1922 – 6 May 1999) was a Japanese track and field athlete. He competed in the men's triple jump at the 1952 Summer Olympics.
