= Hannes Sonck =

Finnish athlete

Personal information
- Born: 25 August 1919 Kamennogorsk, Russia
- Died: 18 May 1952 (aged 32) Helsinki, Finland
- Height: 189 cm (6 ft 2 in)
- Weight: 87 kg (192 lb)

Sport
- Sport: Athletics
- Event(s): Triple jump, long jump, decathlon
- Club: Viipurin Urheilijat, Helsinki

Achievements and titles
- Personal best(s): TJ – 15.04 m (1945); LJ – 7.29 m (1943); Decathlon – 6623 (1942)

Johannes Erik Eiel Sonck (25 August 1919 – 18 May 1952) was a Finnish athlete. He finished fifth in the triple jump at the 1946 European Championships and 17th in the decathlon at the 1948 Summer Olympics, where he served as the Finnish flag bearer at the opening ceremony.
