= Reino Hiltunen =

Finnish triple jumper (1924–2021)

Reino Jaakko Matias Hiltunen (16 November 1924 – 21 August 2021) was a Finnish triple jumper who competed in the 1952 Summer Olympics. He was born in Helsinki in November 1924 and died in Vaasa in August 2021, at the age of 96.
