= Werner Spycher =

Swiss wrestler (1916–1996)

Personal information
- Nationality: Swiss
- Born: 22 November 1916
- Died: 20 October 1996 (aged 79) Belp, Switzerland

Sport
- Sport: Wrestling

Werner Spycher (22 November 1916 – 20 October 1996) was a Swiss wrestler who competed in the men's freestyle featherweight at the 1936 Summer Olympics. Spycher died in Belp, Switzerland on 20 October 1996, at the age of 79.
