= Wrestling at the 1936 Summer Olympics – Men's freestyle featherweight =

Men's freestyle featherweight at the Games of the XI Olympiad
- Venue: Deutschlandhalle
- Dates: 2–4 August 1936
- Competitors: 15 from 15 nations

Medalists
1st place, gold medalist(s)		Kustaa Pihlajamäki	Finland
2nd place, silver medalist(s)		Francis Millard	United States
3rd place, bronze medalist(s)		Gösta Frändfors	Sweden

The men's freestyle featherweight competition at the 1936 Summer Olympics in Berlin took place from 2 August to 4 August at the Deutschlandhalle. Nations were limited to one competitor. This weight class was limited to wrestlers weighing up to 61kg.

This freestyle wrestling competition continued to use the "bad points" elimination system introduced at the 1928 Summer Olympics for Greco-Roman and at the 1932 Summer Olympics for freestyle wrestling, with a slight modification. Each round featured all wrestlers pairing off and wrestling one bout (with one wrestler having a bye if there were an odd number). The loser received 3 points if the loss was by fall or unanimous decision and 2 points if the decision was 2-1 (this was the modification from prior years, where all losses were 3 points). The winner received 1 point if the win was by decision and 0 points if the win was by fall. At the end of each round, any wrestler with at least 5 points was eliminated.

== Schedule ==
Date	Event
2 August 1936	Round 1
3 August 1936	Round 2
4 August 1936	Round 3 Round 4 Round 5 Round 6

== Results ==
=== Round 1 ===
The four wrestlers who won by fall and the one with the bye took the lead, with 0 bad points. The three other winners by decision each received 1 point. All of the losers were defeated by either fall or unanimous decision, so each received 3 points.

Bouts

Winner	Nation	Victory Type	Loser	Nation
Nevil Hall	South Africa	Decision, 3–0	Karel Kváček	Czechoslovakia
Gösta Frändfors	Sweden	Fall	Marco Gavelli	Italy
Norman Morrell	Great Britain	Decision, 3–0	Josef Böck	Germany
Francis Millard	United States	Fall	Jean Chasson	France
Ferenc Tóth	Hungary	Fall	Yaşar Erkan	Turkey
Kustaa Pihlajamäki	Finland	Fall	Hector Riské	Belgium
Mitsuo Mizutani	Japan	Decision, 3–0	Werner Spycher	Switzerland
Vern Pettigrew	Canada	Bye	N/A	N/A

Points

Rank	Wrestler	Nation	Start	Earned	Total
1	Gösta Frändfors	Sweden	0	0	0
1	Francis Millard	United States	0	0	0
1	Vern Pettigrew	Canada	0	0	0
1	Kustaa Pihlajamäki	Finland	0	0	0
1	Ferenc Tóth	Hungary	0	0	0
6	Nevil Hall	South Africa	0	1	1
6	Mitsuo Mizutani	Japan	0	1	1
6	Norman Morrell	Great Britain	0	1	1
9	Josef Bock	Germany	0	3	3
9	Jean Chasson	France	0	3	3
9	Yaşar Erkan	Turkey	0	3	3
9	Marco Gavelli	Italy	0	3	3
9	Karel Kvaček	Czechoslovakia	0	3	3
9	Hector Riské	Belgium	0	3	3
9	Werner Spycher	Switzerland	0	3	3

=== Round 2 ===
Three men maintained 0-point scores through the first two rounds, with three more scoring 1 point total. The five wrestlers who lost in both the first two rounds were eliminated. No wrestlers finished the round with 2 or 3 points; four finished with 4 points.

Bouts

Winner	Nation	Victory Type	Loser	Nation
Vern Pettigrew	Canada	Decision, 3–0	Karel Kvaček	Czechoslovakia
Marco Gavelli	Italy	Decision, 3–0	Nevil Hall	South Africa
Gösta Frändfors	Sweden	Decision, 3–0	Josef Bock	Germany
Francis Millard	United States	Fall	Norman Morrell	Great Britain
Ferenc Tóth	Hungary	Fall	Jean Chasson	France
Yaşar Erkan	Turkey	Decision, 3–0	Hector Riské	Belgium
Kustaa Pihlajamäki	Finland	Fall	Werner Spycher	Switzerland
Mitsuo Mizutani	Japan	Bye	N/A	N/A

Points

Rank	Wrestler	Nation	Start	Earned	Total
1	Francis Millard	United States	0	0	0
1	Kustaa Pihlajamäki	Finland	0	0	0
1	Ferenc Tóth	Hungary	0	0	0
4	Gösta Frändfors	Sweden	0	1	1
4	Mitsuo Mizutani	Japan	1	0	1
4	Vern Pettigrew	Canada	0	1	1
7	Yaşar Erkan	Turkey	3	1	4
7	Marco Gavelli	Italy	3	1	4
7	Nevil Hall	South Africa	1	3	4
7	Norman Morrell	Great Britain	1	3	4
11	Josef Bock	Germany	3	3	6
11	Jean Chasson	France	3	3	6
11	Karel Kvaček	Czechoslovakia	3	3	6
11	Hector Riské	Belgium	3	3	6
11	Werner Spycher	Switzerland	3	3	6

=== Round 3 ===
Three losers and one winner were eliminated this round; Gavelli was out with a 5th point after winning by decision. Pihlajamäki was the only wrestler to maintain a 0-point score through the third round, though three men had only 1 point apiece.

Bouts

Winner	Nation	Victory Type	Loser	Nation
Vern Pettigrew	Canada	Fall	Mitsuo Mizutani	Japan
Gösta Frändfors	Sweden	Fall	Nevil Hall	South Africa
Marco Gavelli	Italy	Decision, 3–0	Norman Morrell	Great Britain
Francis Millard	United States	Decision, 3–0	Ferenc Tóth	Hungary
Kustaa Pihlajamäki	Finland	Fall	Yaşar Erkan	Turkey

Points

Rank	Wrestler	Nation	Start	Earned	Total
1	Kustaa Pihlajamäki	Finland	0	0	0
2	Gösta Frändfors	Sweden	1	0	1
2	Francis Millard	United States	0	1	1
2	Vern Pettigrew	Canada	1	0	1
5	Ferenc Tóth	Hungary	0	3	3
6	Mitsuo Mizutani	Japan	1	3	4
7	Marco Gavelli	Italy	4	1	5
8	Yaşar Erkan	Turkey	4	3	7
8	Nevil Hall	South Africa	4	3	7
8	Norman Morrell	Great Britain	4	3	7

=== Round 4 ===
Of the three losers, Tóth and Mizutani were eliminated. Pettigrew had started with 1 point, so remained in contention with 4 after losing. Pihlajamäki won by fall again, keeping his 0 point run intact. Millard had 1 point, Frändfors had 2.

Bouts

Winner	Nation	Victory Type	Loser	Nation
Gösta Frändfors	Sweden	Decision, 3–0	Mitsuo Mizutani	Japan
Francis Millard	United States	Fall	Vern Pettigrew	Canada
Kustaa Pihlajamäki	Finland	Fall	Ferenc Tóth	Hungary

Points

Rank	Wrestler	Nation	Start	Earned	Total
1	Kustaa Pihlajamäki	Finland	0	0	0
2	Francis Millard	United States	1	0	1
3	Gösta Frändfors	Sweden	1	1	2
4	Vern Pettigrew	Canada	1	3	4
5	Ferenc Tóth	Hungary	3	3	6
6	Mitsuo Mizutani	Japan	4	3	7

=== Round 5 ===
The first bout pitted Frändfors against Pettigrew; each was threatened with elimination with a loss (though Frändfors would remain if he lost by split decision). Frändfors came out the victor by decision, eliminating Pettigrew. The second bout featured Pihlajamäki and Millard, neither of whom could be eliminated in the round. Millard's loss by unanimous decision took him from 1 point to 4 points, while Pihlajamäki received his first point. This left three men to contest the medals.

Bouts

Winner	Nation	Victory Type	Loser	Nation
Gösta Frändfors	Sweden	Decision, 3–0	Vern Pettigrew	Canada
Kustaa Pihlajamäki	Finland	Decision, 3–0	Francis Millard	United States

Points

Rank	Wrestler	Nation	Start	Earned	Total
1	Kustaa Pihlajamäki	Finland	0	1	1
2	Francis Millard	United States	1	3	4
3	Gösta Frändfors	Sweden	2	1	3
4	Vern Pettigrew	Canada	4	3	7

=== Round 6 ===
Frändfors had not faced the two other remaining wrestlers, but Millard and Pihlajamäki had faced each other. Pihlajamäki had the bye in round 6. If Frändfors had won this round, he would have faced Pihlajamäki in a final round. However, Millard proved the better by split decision, giving both wrestlers 5 points and ending the competition with Pihlajamäki the only man left to take gold. The tie between Millard and Frändfors at 5 points was broken by the results of this round itself, with Millard's head-to-head win earning him silver and placing Frändfors in third for the bronze.

Bouts

Winner	Nation	Victory Type	Loser	Nation
Francis Millard	United States	Decision, 2–1	Gösta Frändfors	Sweden
Kustaa Pihlajamäki	Finland	Bye	N/A	N/A

Points

Rank	Wrestler	Nation	Start	Earned	Total
1st place, gold medalist(s)	Kustaa Pihlajamäki	Finland	1	0	1
2nd place, silver medalist(s)	Francis Millard	United States	4	1	5
3rd place, bronze medalist(s)	Gösta Frändfors	Sweden	3	2	5
