= Malik M'Baye =

French athlete

Malik M'Baye (December 6, 1921 – 1993) was a French athlete who specialised in the triple jump. M'Baye was born in Senegal and competed at the 1952 Summer Olympics.
