= Nikola Dagorov =

Bulgarian triple jumper (1925–2019)

Nikola Dagorov (Bulgarian: Никола Дагоров) (3 June 1925 – c. 1 July 2019) was a Bulgarian triple jumper who competed in the 1952 Summer Olympics. He died in 2019 at the age of 94.
