= Josef Böck =

German wrestler

Personal information
- Nationality: German
- Born: 22 June 1913 Munich, Germany
- Died: 6 May 1999 (aged 85) Munich, Germany

Sport
- Sport: Wrestling

Josef Böck (22 June 1913 – 6 May 1999) was a German wrestler. He competed in the men's freestyle featherweight at the 1936 Summer Olympics.
