= Karel Kváček =

Czech wrestler

Personal information
- Nationality: Czech
- Born: 17 June 1912
- Died: 23 July 1986 (aged 74)

Sport
- Sport: Wrestling

Karel Kváček (17 June 1912 – 23 July 1986) was a Czech wrestler. He competed in the men's freestyle featherweight at the 1936 Summer Olympics.
