= Jacques Boulanger =

French triple jumper (1927–1995)

Personal information
- Nationality: French
- Born: 26 April 1927
- Died: 4 August 1956 (aged 29)

Sport
- Sport: Athletics
- Event: Triple jump

Jacques Boulanger (26 April 1927 – 4 August 1956) was a French athlete. He competed in the men's triple jump at the 1952 Summer Olympics.
