= Ruhi Sarıalp =

Turkish triple jumper

Medal record

Men's athletics

Representing Turkey

Olympic Games
Bronze medal – third place	1948 London	Triple jump

European Championships
Bronze medal – third place	1950 Brussels	Triple jump

Ruhi Sarıalp (December 15, 1924 – March 3, 2001) was a Turkish track and field athlete, who competed mainly in the triple jump. He was born in Manisa.

== Background ==
He competed for Turkey in the 1948 Summer Olympics held in London, Great Britain in the triple jump, where he won the bronze medal with a mark of 15.02 m.

He started athletics during his education at the military high school in Konya. In 1945, he broke the Turkish record in triple jump. After his bronze medal jump at the Olympics, he won another bronze medal at the 1950 European Athletics Championships in Brussels, Belgium. He became so the first ever track and field athlete from Turkey to win a medal at the Olympics and the European Championships. Ruhi Sarıalp became champion at the World Military Athletics Championships held 1951 in Rome, Italy by breaking the World record. He repeated his first place in the same championships of 1952.

After leaving the active sports, Ruhi Sarıalp served as a lecturer for physical education in the School of Maritime at Istanbul Technical University (İTÜ). The indoor sports hall of İTÜ, located in the Tuzla district of Istanbul, is named after him. He was a member of the supreme council of the Fenerbahçe SK athletic branch Fenerbahçe Athletics.

He died on March 3, 2001, in İzmir due to agonal respiration, and was buried in the Edirnekapı Martyr's Cemetery in Istanbul. He was married with Ayşe Cebesoy, a niece of the renowned Turkish statesman Ali Fuat Cebesoy.
