= João Vieira (triple jumper) =

Portuguese triple jumper

Personal information
- Full name: João do Carmo Rodrigues Vieira
- Nationality: Portuguese
- Born: 6 March 1919 Lisbon, Portugal

Sport
- Sport: Athletics
- Event: Triple jump

João Vieira (born 6 March 1919, date of death unknown) was a Portuguese athlete. He competed in the men's triple jump at the 1948 Summer Olympics. Vieira is deceased.
