= Lennart Moberg =

Swedish triple jumper (1918–1991)

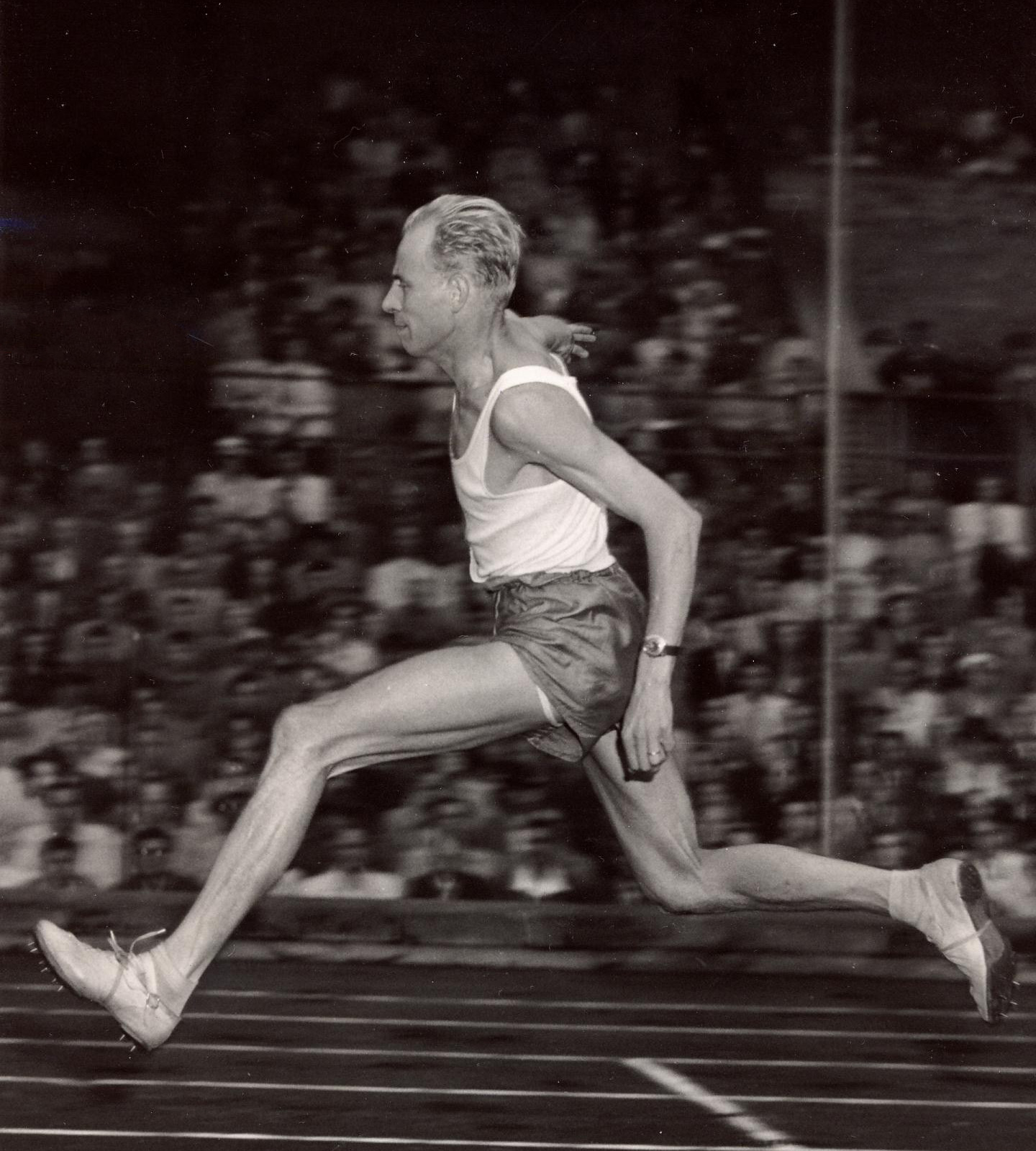
- Lennart Moberg in 1950

Personal information
- Born: 26 December 1918 Stora Tuna, Sweden
- Died: 5 February 1991 (aged 72) Södertälje, Sweden
- Height: 1.90 m (6 ft 3 in)
- Weight: 73 kg (161 lb)

Sport
- Sport: Athletics
- Event: Triple jump
- Club: SoIK Hellas

Achievements and titles
- Personal best: 15.27 m (1948)

Karl Gustaf Lennart Moberg (26 December 1918 – 5 February 1991) was a Swedish triple jumper. He competed at the 1948 Summer Olympics and 1950 European Athletics Championships and finished in 13th and 6th place, respectively.

Moberg held the Swedish triple jump title in 1948 and 1949. In 1948 he beat Arne Åhman, who became an Olympic champion later that year.
