= Francis Millard =

American wrestler (1914–1958)

Personal information
- Full name: Francis Edward Millard
- Born: May 31, 1914 North Adams, Massachusetts, U.S.
- Died: October 19, 1958 (aged 44) North Adams, Massachusetts, U.S.
Medal record
Men's freestyle wrestling
Representing the United States
Olympic Games
Silver medal – second place	1936 Berlin	61 kg

Francis Edward Millard (May 31, 1914 – October 19, 1958) was an American wrestler who competed in the 1936 Summer Olympics. In 1936, he won the silver medal in the freestyle featherweight competition. Millard was inducted into the Massachusetts Chapter of the National Wrestling Hall of Fame in 2005.
