= Luís García =

Portuguese triple jumper

Personal information
- Nationality: Portuguese
- Born: 16 March 1923 Torres Novas, Portugal

Sport
- Sport: Athletics
- Event: Triple jump

Luís García (born 16 March 1923) was a Portuguese athlete. He competed in the men's triple jump at the 1948 Summer Olympics.
