= Roger Norman (athlete) =

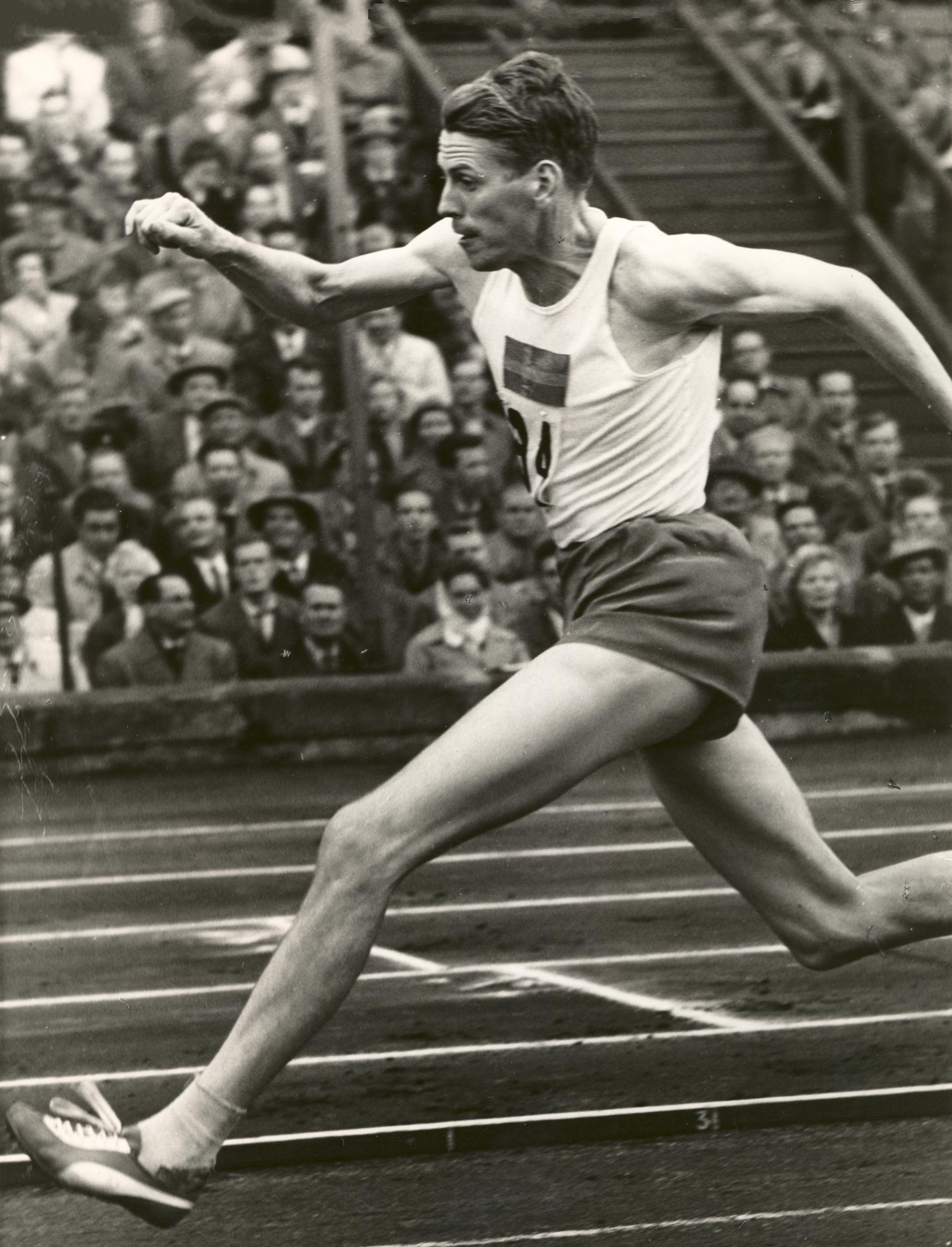

Personal information
- Born: 2 August 1928 Västerås, Sweden
- Died: 29 November 1995 (aged 67) Västerås, Sweden
- Height: 1.90 m (6 ft 3 in)
- Weight: 70 kg (150 lb)

Sport
- Sport: Athletics
- Event: Triple jump
- Club: Västerås IK

Achievements and titles
- Personal best: 15.41 m (1958)
Medal record
Men's athletics
Representing Sweden
European Championships
Silver medal – second place	1954 Bern	Triple jump

Roger Karl Evald Norman (2 August 1928 – 29 November 1995) was a Swedish triple jumper. He won a silver medal at the 1954 European Athletics Championships and finished eighth at the 1952 Summer Olympics.

Norman was the Swedish triple jump champion in 1952–58. After retiring from competitions he stayed with his club Västerås IK as a sports administrator.
