= Luis Jiménez (fencer) =

Mexican fencer 1928–1999

José Librado Luis Jiménez Peña
Personal information
- Born: 25 August 1928 Tierra Blanca, Mexico
- Died: 5 May 1999 (aged 70) Acapulco, Mexico

Sport
- Sport: Fencing

Luis Jiménez (25 August 1928 – 5 May 1999) was a Mexican fencer. He competed in the individual épée event at the 1956 Summer Olympics.
