= Vern Pettigrew =

Canadian wrestler

Personal information
- Born: 30 March 1908 Varney, Ontario, Canada
- Died: 29 October 2003 (aged 95) Regina, Saskatchewan, Canada

Sport
- Sport: Wrestling

Vern Pettigrew (30 March 1908 – 29 October 2003) was a Canadian wrestler. He competed in the men's freestyle featherweight at the 1936 Summer Olympics, where he placed fourth.
