= Heinz Vroomen =

Dutch footballer (1918–2003)

Personal information
- Date of birth: 24 November 1918
- Place of birth: Kerkrade, Limburg, Netherlands
- Date of death: 3 October 2003 (aged 84)
- Place of death: Heerlen, Limburg, Netherlands

International career
Years	Team	Apps	(Gls)
1940	Netherlands	1	(0)

Heinz Vroomen (24 November 1918 – 3 October 2003) was a Dutch footballer. He played in one match for the Netherlands national football team in 1940.
