= Rui Ramos (athlete) =

Portuguese triple jumper

Personal information
- Full name: Rui António Ferreira Ramos
- Nationality: Portuguese
- Born: 9 July 1930 Tavira, Portugal

Sport
- Sport: Athletics
- Event: Triple jump

Rui Ramos (born 9 July 1930) is a Portuguese former athlete. He competed in the men's triple jump at the 1952 Summer Olympics.
