= Bob Beckus =

American triple jumper

Personal information
- Nationality: American
- Born: June 1, 1920
- Died: October 21, 2003 (aged 83)

Sport
- Sport: Athletics
- Event: Triple jump

Bob Beckus (June 1, 1920 – October 21, 2003) was an American athlete. He competed in the men's triple jump at the 1948 Summer Olympics.
