= Robert Bobin =

French triple jumper (1920–1994)

Personal information
- Nationality: French
- Born: 2 August 1920
- Died: 11 February 1994 (aged 73)

Sport
- Sport: Athletics
- Event: Triple jump

Robert Bobin (2 August 1920 – 11 February 1994) was a French athlete. He competed in the men's triple jump at the 1948 Summer Olympics.
