= Valdemar Rautio =

Finnish triple jumper (1921–1973)

Personal information
- Full name: Karl Johan Valdemar Rautio
- Nickname: Valle
- Born: 4 January 1921 Vaasa, Pohjanmaa, Finland
- Died: 5 September 1973 (aged 52) Nurmijärvi, Uusimaa, Finland
Medal record
Men's athletics
Representing Finland
European Championships
| Gold medal – first place | 1946 Oslo | Triple jump |
| Silver medal – second place | 1950 Brussels | Triple jump |

Karl Johan Valdemar "Valle" Rautio (4 January 1921 – 5 September 1973) was a Finnish athlete who competed in the 1948 Summer Olympics and in the 1952 Summer Olympics. Rautio earned a gold medal in the 1946 European Athletics Championships in the Triple Jump, and achieved silver four years later.
