= Leonid Shcherbakov =

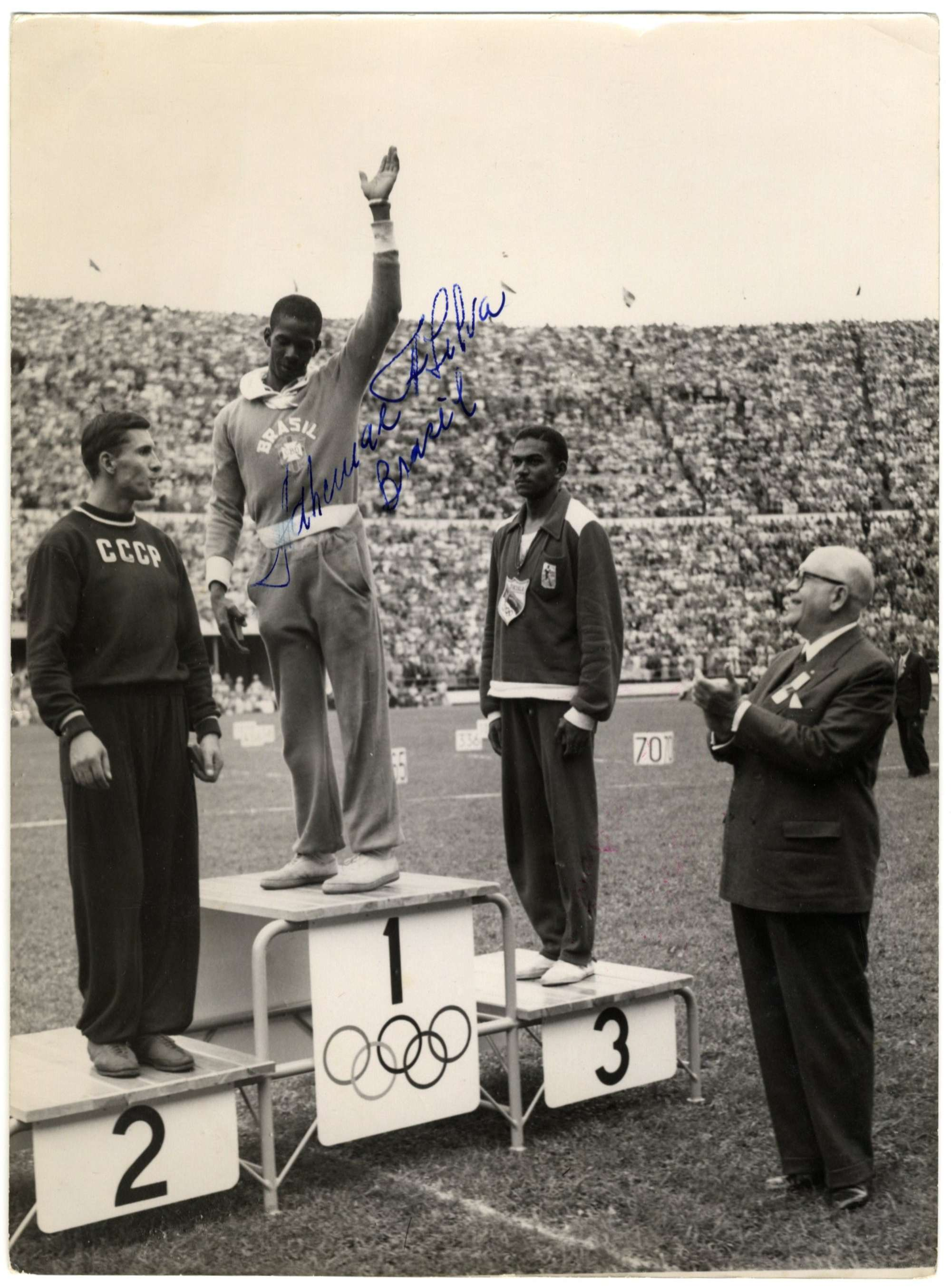

Personal information
- Full name: Leonid Mikhailovich Shcherbakov
- Born: 7 April 1927 Olebino, Yaroslavl Oblast, Russian SFSR, Soviet Union
- Died: 19 May 2004 (aged 77) Moscow, Russia
- Height: 178 cm (5 ft 10 in)
- Weight: 73 kg (161 lb)

Sport
- Sport: Athletics
- Event: Triple jump
- Club: Dynamo Moscow
- Coached by: Nikolay Ozolin

Achievements and titles
- Personal best: 16.46 m (1956)
Medal record
Men's athletics
Representing the Soviet Union
Olympic Games
Silver medal – second place	1952 Helsinki	Triple jump
European Championships
Gold medal – first place	1950 Brussels	Triple jump
Gold medal – first place	1954 Bern	Triple jump

Leonid Mikhailovich Shcherbakov (Russian: Леонид Михайлович Щербаков, (7 April 1927 – 19 May 2004) was a Russian retired triple jumper who won a silver medal at the 1952 Olympics. He broke the world record in 1953 and won the European title in 1950 and 1954. Domestically he won eight consecutive Soviet titles in 1949–56.

After retiring from competitions, Shcherbakov worked at the Russian State University of Physical Education, Sport, Youth and Tourism, and later coached triple jumpers in Algeria and Cuba. His trainees included Pedro Pérez. In 1987 he was named an IAAF top 10 performer of all time in the triple jump.

Records
Preceded by (Brazil) Adhemar da Silva	Men's Triple Jump World Record Holder; 1953-07-19 – 1955-03-26	Succeeded by (Brazil) Adhemar da Silva
