= Mitsuzo Mizutani =

Japanese wrestler

Personal information
- Nationality: Japanese
- Born: 5 October 1915

Sport
- Sport: Wrestling

Mitsuzo Mizutani (水谷 光三, Mizutani Mitsuzō; born 5 October 1915, date of death unknown) was a Japanese wrestler. He competed in the men's freestyle featherweight at the 1936 Summer Olympics.
