= Arne Åhman =

Swedish triple jumper (1925–2022)

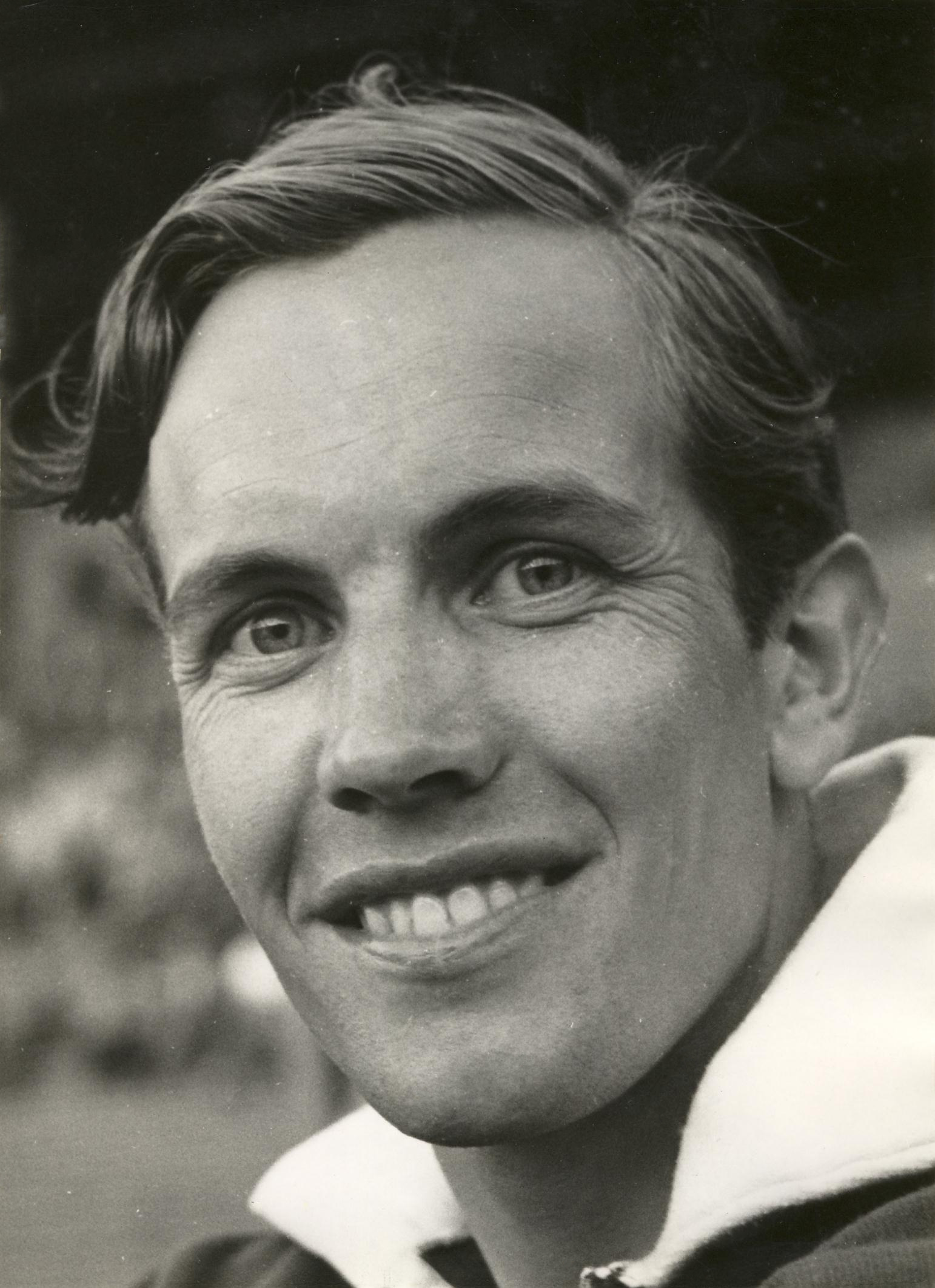

Personal information
- Born: 4 February 1925 Nordingrå, Sweden
- Died: 5 July 2022 (aged 97) Umeå, Sweden
- Height: 1.76 m (5 ft 9 in)
- Weight: 64 kg (141 lb)

Sport
- Sport: Athletics
- Events: Triple jump, high jump
- Club: Nordingrå SK

Achievements and titles
- Personal bests: TJ – 15.40 m (1948); HJ – 1.99 m (1951)
Medal record
Men's athletics
Representing Sweden
Olympic Games
Gold medal – first place	1948 London	Triple jump
European Championships
Bronze medal – third place	1946 Oslo	Triple jump
Silver medal – second place	1950 Brussels	High jump

Per Arne Åhman (4 February 1925 – 5 July 2022) was a Swedish athlete who won the triple jump event at the 1948 Summer Olympics.

Åhman was born on 4 February 1925. His first jump measured 15.40 metres and set a new Swedish record. At European championships Åhman won a bronze medal in the triple jump in 1946 and a silver in high jump in 1950. Åhman won national titles in the triple jump in 1946 and 1947 and in the high jump in 1950. He was a teacher by profession. Åhman died on 5 July 2022, at the age of 97.
