= Preben Larsen (athlete) =

Danish triple and long jumper (1922–1965)

Personal information
- Nationality: Danish
- Born: 7 September 1922
- Died: 12 November 1965 (aged 43)

Sport
- Sport: Athletics
- Event: Triple jump

Preben Larsen (7 September 1922 – 12 November 1965) was a Danish athlete. He competed in the men's triple jump at the 1948 Summer Olympics and the 1952 Summer Olympics.
