= Deaths in May 2001 =

The following is a list of notable deaths in May 2001.

Entries for each day are listed alphabetically by surname. A typical entry lists information in the following sequence:

- Name, age, country of citizenship at birth, subsequent country of citizenship (if applicable), reason for notability, cause of death (if known), and reference.

== May 2001 ==
=== 1 ===
- Christopher Church, 60, British Olympic cyclist (1964).
- Dorothy Drew, 66, British Olympic diver (1952).
- Happy Hairston, 58, American basketball player (Cincinnati Royals, Detroit Pistons, Los Angeles Lakers), prostate cancer.
- Waldemar Kikolski, 33, Polish paralympic athlete, road accident.
- Ernie Pomfret, 60, British middle-distance runner and Olympian (1964).
- Elsa Prawitz, 69, Swedish film and stage actress.
- Ernie Wheelwright, 61, American football player (New York Giants, Atlanta Falcons, New Orleans Saints), cancer.

=== 2 ===
- Enrico Bovone, 55, Italian basketball player and Olympian (1968), suicide by gunshot.
- Poul Dalsager, 72, Danish politician.
- Georges Dard, 82, French football player.
- Vlasta Foltová, 88, Czech gymnast and Olympic silver medalist (1936).
- Dick Jamieson, 63, American football player (Baltimore Colts, New York Titans) and coach.
- Howard Kahane, 73, American professor of philosophy.
- Gina Mastrogiacomo, 39, American actress (Goodfellas, Harry and the Hendersons, Jungle Fever), myocarditis.
- Abdul Sattar Khan Niazi, 85, Pakistani religious and political leader.
- Ted Rogers, 65, British comedian, complications after open-heart surgery.
- Theodore Roosevelt III, 86, American banker and government official.
- Klement Steinmetz, 86, Austrian Olympic football player (1936).

=== 3 ===
- Philip George Houthem Gell, 86, British immunologist.
- Jim Godman, 55, American professional bowler.
- Billy Higgins, 64, American jazz drummer, hepatitis.
- Rolf Jahn, 73, German footballer.
- Karel Kalaš, 90, Czech operatic bass and actor.
- Princess Rosemary of Salm-Salm, 97, German noblewoman.
- Hank Schmulbach, 76, American baseball player (St. Louis Browns).
- Robert Millner Shackleton, 91, British field geologist.
- Roberto Sloane, 76, Mexican Olympic sailor (1968).

=== 4 ===
- Anne Anastasi, 92, American psychologist.
- Bonny Lee Bakley, 44, American socialite, shot.
- Gene Grabosky, 64, American professional football player (Syracuse University, Buffalo Bills).
- Vaska Ilieva, 78, Macedonian folk singer from Yugoslavia and North Macedonia.
- Eleanor Lausch Dietrich, 88, American soprano
- Arne Sucksdorff, 84, Swedish film director, pneumonia.
- Stan Newsham, 69, English footballer, (AFC Bournemouth, Notts County)

=== 5 ===
- Esteban Aguilera, 59, Cuban Olympic boxer (1960).
- Charles Black, 85, American constitutional scholar.
- Boozoo Chavis, 70, American accordion player, singer, songwriter and bandleader (Zydeco), complications from a heart attack.
- Francisco Figueroa, 94, Uruguayan Olympic water polo player (1936).
- Morris Graves, 90, American expressionist painter, stroke.
- Cliff Hillegass, 83, American creator of CliffsNotes, stroke.
- Bill Homeier, 82, American racecar driver (three Indianapolis 500s).
- David Jamieson, 80, British Army officer, recipient of the Victoria Cross.
- Aleksandr Petrov, 61, Soviet/Russian basketball player and Olympian (1960, 1964).
- Hans Rampf, 70, German Olympic ice hockey player (1956, 1960).
- Terry Ryan, 78, American screenwriter, congestive heart failure.
- Wang Yinglai, 93, Chinese biochemist.

=== 6 ===
- Egon Andersen, 90, Danish footballer.
- René Bondoux, 95, French fencer and Olympic champion (1932, 1936).
- Mike Hazlewood, 59, English singer, composer and songwriter, heart attack.
- Karl Wilhelm Krause, 90, German Waffen-SS officer during World War II.
- Ludwig Kuhn, 82, German Olympic ice hockey player (1952).
- Zoltán Nemere, 59, Hungarian fencer and Olympian (1964, 1968), traffic collision.
- Cecil Price, 63, American deputy sheriff and Ku Klux Klan member, fall from a lift.

=== 7 ===
- Malati Bedekar, 96, Indian writer.
- Jacques de Bourbon-Busset, 89, French novelist, essayist and politician.
- Prem Dhawan, 77, Indian lyricist, music composer, and actor of Bollywood, cardiac arrest.
- Edwin Finckel, 83, American jazz pianist, composer (George White's Scandals) and music educator.
- Joseph Greenberg, 85, American linguist, pancreatic cancer.
- Dick Kimble, 85, American baseball player (Washington Senators).
- Margaretha Krook, 75, Swedish actress, lung cancer.
- Boris Ryzhy, 26, Russian poet and geologist, suicide by hanging.
- Simon Slåttvik, 83, Norwegian Olympic skier (1952).
- Al Tucker, 58, American basketball player.
- Arthur Christopher Watson, 74, British diplomat.

=== 8 ===
- Paul Dekker, 70, American football player (Washington Redskins).
- Larry Hornung, 55, Canadian ice hockey player (St. Louis Blues), cancer.
- Eiichi Kazama, 85, Japanese Olympic wrestler (1936).
- Bruno Masciadri, 87, Swiss Olympic canoeist (1948).
- John McMahon, 83, Australian-English cricket player.
- Piero Natoli, 53, Italian actor and film director, intracranial aneurysm.
- Dera Natung, 36, Indian politician, member of the Arunachal Pradesh Legislative Assembly (since 1989), helicopter crash.
- Luis Rijo, 73, Uruguayan football player.
- Clay King Smith, 30, American convicted murderer, execution by lethal injection.

=== 9 ===
- Marie Cardinal, 72, French novelist.
- Antoinette Downing, 96, American architectural historian and preservationist.
- Saul Elkins, 93, American film producer, writer and director.
- Andrés Framini, 86, Argentine labor leader and politician.
- Charlie Hardy, 67, American football player (Oakland Raiders).
- Miroslav Kárný, 81, Czech historian and writer.
- Nikos Sampson, 65, Cypriot politician, de facto President of Cyprus (1974), cancer.
- Werner Schuster, 62, German politician, liver cancer.
- William T. Stearn, 90, British botanist, pneumonia.
- Kauko Wahlsten, 77, Finnish rower and Olympic medalist (1952).
- Smokey Yunick, 77, American mechanic and car designer, leukemia.

=== 10 ===
- Turi Ferro, 80, Italian actor (Liolà, The Seduction of Mimi, Malizia), heart attack.
- James E. Myers, 81, American songwriter ("Rock Around the Clock"), actor and director.
- Sudhakarrao Naik, 66, Indian politician.
- M. Krishnan Nair, 74, Indian film director.
- Frank Newby, 75, English structural engineer.
- Arthur Tange, 86, Australian public servant, leukaemia.
- Dorothy Burr Thompson, 100, American classical archaeologist and art historian.
- Michel Viaud, 61, French Olympic rower (1960, 1964).
- Deborah Walley, 59, American actress (Gidget Goes Hawaiian, Beach Blanket Bingo, Spinout) and voice-over artist, esophageal cancer.

=== 11 ===
- Douglas Adams, 49, British author (The Hitchhiker's Guide to the Galaxy, Doctor Who), heart attack.
- Jesús Aguirre, 66, Spanish intellectual, Jesuit priest, and aristocrat, pulmonary embolism.
- Michael J. Bird, 72, British writer.
- Guy Carlton, 47, American Olympic weightlifter (1984), suicide by gunshot.
- Leroy John Contie Jr., 81, American judge.
- Alan William James Cousins, 97, South African astronomer.
- Nick Lalich, 85, Serbian American basketball player, esophageal cancer.
- Emmett Watson, 82, American newspaper columnist, complications from abdominal aneurysm surgery.
- Wolfgang Winkler, 60, West German luger and Olympic medalist (1968, 1972).

=== 12 ===
- John Cliff, 82, American film and television actor, cancer.
- Ollie Cline, 75, American gridiron football player (Cleveland Browns, Buffalo Bills, Detroit Lions).
- Perry Como, 88, American singer, actor and television personality, Alzheimer's disease.
- Didi, 72, Brazilian footballer, pneumonia.
- Willy Gysi, 83, Swiss Olympic field handball player (1936).
- Norman Kay, 72, British composer and writer, ALS.
- Paul Morgan, 52, British engineer, co-founder of Ilmor, plane crash.
- Jonathan Niva, 58, Kenyan football player.
- Mel Payton, 74, American basketball player (Philadelphia Warriors, Indianapolis Olympians).
- Fritz Pfenninger, 66, Swiss cyclist.
- Simon Raven, 73, British writer.
- Eleanor Sayre, 85, American curator and art historian.
- Alexei Tupolev, 75, Soviet aircraft designer.
- Georgie Woodgate, 77, British tennis player.
- Caleb Merrill Wright, 92, American district judge (United States District Court for the District of Delaware).
- Corissa Yasen, 27, American basketball player, suicide by drug overdose.

=== 13 ===
- Sergey Afanasyev, 82, Russian engineer and politician.
- Ralph Almas, 77, Canadian ice hockey player (Detroit Red Wings, Chicago Black Hawks).
- Eddra Gale, 79, American actress (8½, What's New Pussycat?, The Graduate, I Love You, Alice B. Toklas, Somewhere in Time), complications from a stroke.
- Salvador Garmendia Graterón, 72, Venezuelan author.
- Frank Millar, 76, Northern Irish unionist politician.
- Jason Miller, 62, American actor (The Exorcist, Rudy) and playwright (That Championship Season), Tony winner (1973), heart attack.
- Harold Minter, 98, American film editor.
- R. K. Narayan, 94, Indian writer.
- Ray Straw, 67, English footballer.
- Ralph Tabakin, 79, American actor, heart disease.
- Susumu Takahashi, 80, Japanese Olympic middle-distance runner (1952).

=== 14 ===
- Mauro Bolognini, 78, Italian film and stage director, amyotrophic lateral sclerosis.
- Eric Bradbury, 80, British comic artist.
- Paul Bénichou, 92, French-Algerian writer, intellectual, and literary historian.
- Alex Glasgow, 65, English singer-songwriter (On Your Way, Riley!, When the Boat Comes In), early-onset dementia.
- Gil Langley, 81, Australian cricketer and politician, Alzheimer's disease.
- Elisabeth Lennartz, 98, German stage actress.
- Loften Mitchell, 82, American playwright and theatre historian.
- Armando Nannuzzi, 75, Italian cinematographer and camera operator.
- Ettore Puricelli, 84, Uruguayan-Italian football player and manager.
- Juan Verdaguer, 85, Uruguayan actor, cardiovascular disease.

=== 15 ===
- Jean-Philippe Lauer, 99, French architect and Egyptologist.
- Juracy Magalhães, 95, Brazilian military officer and politician.
- Ralph Miller, 82, American college basketball coach.
- Bobby Murdoch, 56, Scottish footballer, stroke.
- William Oates, 71, English first-class cricketer.
- Chuck Sample, 81, American football player (Green Bay Packers).
- Georgy Shakhnazarov, 76, Soviet-Armenian politician and political scientist.
- Sacha Vierny, 81, French cinematographer.
- Eric Wennerberg, 84, Swedish bobsledder and Olympian (1968).

=== 16 ===
- Antonio Flores, 77, Mexican football player.
- Prince Ital Joe, 38, Dominican-American reggae artist, car accident.
- Brian Pendleton, 57, British guitarist (The Pretty Things), lung cancer.
- Witold Stachurski, 54, Polish boxer and Olympian (1968, 1972).

=== 17 ===
- Robert Elton Brooker, 95, American business executive at Sears, Roebuck & Co.
- Ike Brown, 59, American baseball player (Detroit Tigers), cancer.
- Gerd Buchdahl, 86, German-English philosopher of science.
- Rahman Dadman, 44-45, Iranian politician, minister of roads and transportation (since 2001), plane crash.
- Ikuma Dan, 77, Japanese composer.
- Luis Ganoza, 80, Peruvian Olympic pole vaulter (1948).
- Enid Hattersley, 96, English politician and Lord Mayor of Sheffield.
- Robert Knapp, 77, American actor (Days of Our Lives, Dragnet, Gunsmoke, The F.B.I.).
- Jacques-Louis Lions, 73, French mathematician.
- Murray Murdoch, 96, Canadian ice hockey player (New York Rangers), and coach.
- Frank G. Slaughter, 93, American novelist and physician.

=== 18 ===
- Rosa Beddington, 45, British biologist, cancer.
- Ralph Enckell, 88, Finnish diplomat.
- Irene Hunt, 99, American children's writer.
- Alexey Maresyev, 84, Russian military pilot, infarction.
- Stella Mary Newton, 100, British fashion designer and dress historian.
- Maurice Noble, 90, American animation artist and designer.
- Seán Mac Stíofáin, 73, English-Irish chief of staff of the Provisional IRA, stroke.
- Robert F. Woodward, 92, American diplomat, heart failure.

=== 19 ===
- Charles Binaux, 72, French Olympic cross-country skier (1956).
- Fred Derby, 61, Surinamese politician and trade unionist.
- John Joseph Egan, 84, American Roman Catholic priest and social activist.
- Joe Graydon, 82, American big band vocalist, television host, personal manager and concert producer, cancer.
- Josef Haunzwickel, 86, Austrian Olympic athlete (1936).
- Patricia Hilliard, 85, British stage and film actress.
- Vidkunn Hveding, 80, Norwegian politician.
- Joe Lovitto, 50, American baseball player (Texas Rangers), cancer.
- Hans Mayer, 94, German literary scholar.
- Susannah McCorkle, 55, American jazz singer, suicide by jumping.
- Mike Sammes, 73, English musician and vocal session arranger.
- Pat Falken Smith, 75, American television writer.
- Bob Tinning, 75, Australian rower and Olympian (1952).
- John Warner, 77, British actor, heart attack.

=== 20 ===
- Carl Eric Almgren, 88, Swedish Army general.
- Josef Buemberger, 96, Austrian Olympic wrestler (1936).
- Renato Carosone, 81, Italian musician.
- Bob Keely, 91, American baseball coach (Boston/Milwaukee Braves), scout and player (St. Louis Cardinals).
- Art Mergenthal, 80, American gridiron football player (Cleveland/Los Angeles Rams).
- José Pereira, 73, American baseball player.
- Bud Thomas, 90, American baseball player (Washington Senators, Philadelphia Athletics, Detroit Tigers).
- Giampiero Vitali, 60, Italian footballer and manager.

=== 21 ===
- Philip W. Buchen, 85, American attorney and White House Counsel, pneumonia.
- Joe Campini, 81, American baseball player.
- Mel Hoderlein, 77, American baseball player (Boston Red Sox, Washington Senators).
- Herman Laverdière, 74, Canadian politician, member of the House of Commons of Canada (1963-1968).
- Mario Martinelli, 95, Italian resistance member during World War II and politician.
- Cecil G. Murgatroyd, 42, Australian politician, musician, and comedian, cancer.
- Johnny Rainford, 70, English footballer.
- Gabriele Rumi, 61, Italian Formula One team owner, cancer.
- Tad Szulc, 74, Polish-American journalist, cancer.
- Fritz Uhl, 73, Austrian operatic tenor.
- Graham Webster, 87, British archaeologist.
- Hu Xieqing, 95, Contemporary Chinese painter.

=== 22 ===
- Lorez Alexandria, 71, American jazz singer.
- Katharine Bartlett, 93, American physical anthropologist.
- Jenő Fock, 85, Hungarian communist politician, prime minister (1967-1975).
- Ralph Hamner, 84, American baseball player (Chicago White Sox, Chicago Cubs).
- Jean Hougron, 77, French novelist.
- Leamon King, 65, American sprinter and Olympic champion (1956).
- Whitman Mayo, 70, American actor (Sanford and Son, Boyz n the Hood, Hell Town), heart attack.
- Jack Watling, 78, British actor (The Plane Makers, The Power Game, Pathfinders), cancer.

=== 23 ===
- Ibrahim Abu-Lughod, 72, Palestinian-American academic, lung disease.
- Liu Anyuan, 73, Chinese lieutenant general.
- Harald Bergström, 93, Swedish mathematician.
- Jean Champion, 84, French film actor.
- Lita Chevret, 92, American actress.
- Charles D. Cook, 66, American politician.
- Tommy Eyre, 51, British keyboardist, esophageal cancer.
- Walter Eytan, 90, Israeli diplomat.
- Bob Gaona, 70, American gridiron football player (Pittsburgh Steelers, Philadelphia Eagles).
- Chuck Gelatka, 87, American professional football player (Mississippi State, New York Giants).
- Boris Gyuderov, 74, Bulgarian Olympic volleyball player (1964).
- Lee Chiaw Meng, 64, Singaporean politician, duodenal cancer.
- Arno Mohr, 90, German painter and graphic artist.
- Alessandro Natta, 83, Italian communist politician, respiratory disease.
- P. Ramachandran, 79, Indian politician, Governor of Kerala.
- Jamileh Sheykhi, 71, Iranian actress, heart attack.
- Harry Townes, 86, American actor (Finian's Rainbow, Gunsmoke, The Twilight Zone, Star Trek) and an Episcopalian priest.
- Víctor Trinchín, 89, Uruguayan Olympic sailor (1960).
- Arseny Vorozheykin, 88, Soviet/Russian fighter ace during World War II.

=== 24 ===
- Lucy Boscana, 85, Puerto Rico actress.
- Jo Ann Greer, 74, American singer, Alzheimer's disease.
- Elvin Hutchison, 88, American football player (Detroit Lions).
- Tor Jevne, 72, Norwegian football player and Olympian (1952).
- Paul Kor, 74, Israeli painter and children's writer, lung cancer.
- Ridvan Qazimi, 37, Kosovar Albanian insurgent nationalist, shot by a sniper.
- Patricia Robertson, 38, American physician and NASA astronaut, burn injuries from a plane crash.
- Javier Urruticoechea, 49, Spanish footballer, car crash.

=== 25 ===
- Delme Bryn-Jones, 67, Welsh baritone.
- John W. Holmes, 84, American film editor.
- Alberto Korda, 72, Cuban photographer, heart attack.
- Arturo Maly, 61, Argentine actor, heart attack.
- Malcom McLean, 87, American businessman and shipper, heart failure.
- Harold Ridley, 94, British ophthalmologist.

=== 26 ===
- Vittorio Brambilla, 63, Italian Formula One race car driver, heart attack.
- Roman Codreanu, 48, Romanian Greco-Roman wrestler and Olympic medalist (1976, 1980).
- Johnny Gordon, 69, English football player.
- Anne Haney, 67, American actress (Mrs. Doubtfire, The American President, Liar Liar), congestive heart failure.
- Daniel Hellebuyck, 67, Belgian Olympic boxer (1956).
- Moven Mahachi, 53, Zimbabwean Minister of Defence of the Republic of Zimbabwe, traffic collision.
- Hal Moe, 91, American gridiron football player (Chicago Cardinals), and coach.
- William Molloy, Baron Molloy, 82, British politician.
- Dea Trier Mørch, 59, Danish artist and writer, cancer.

=== 27 ===
- Ramon Bieri, 71, American actor (Sarge, Room 222, Daniel Boone, Gunsmoke), cancer.
- Helen Oakley Dance, 88, Canadian-American jazz journalist, record producer, and music historian.
- Victor Kiam, 74, American entrepreneur and owner of the New England Patriots football team.
- John Polich, 85, American ice hockey player (New York Rangers).
- Agda Rössel, 90, Swedish politician.
- Jack Scowen, 75, Canadian politician, member of the House of Commons of Canada (1984-1988).
- Margaret Stone, 81, Canadian Olympic swimmer (1936).
- Nikolay Yeryomenko, 52, Soviet/Russian actor and film director, stroke.

=== 28 ===
- Tony Ashton, 55, English rock pianist, music producer and artist, cancer.
- Francis Bebey, 71, Cameroonian writer and composer, heart attack.
- Stanley Miarka, 69, American baseball player.
- Joe Moakley, 74, American politician, member of the United States House of Representatives, leukemia.
- Vulimiri Ramalingaswami, 79, Indian medical scientist.
- Rockets Redglare, 52, American character actor and comedian (After Hours, Desperately Seeking Susan), hepatitis and liver cirrhosis.
- Elizabeth S. Russell, 88, American geneticist.
- Francisco Varela, 54, Chilean biologist, philosopher and neuroscientist, heart attack.

=== 29 ===
- John Fleming, 81, British art historian.
- Eddie Forrest, 79, American football player (San Francisco 49ers).
- Akira Fujita, 93, Japanese Olympic water polo player (1932).
- Charley Pell, 60, American college football player and coach, lung cancer.
- Vytautas Sakalauskas, 68, Soviet and Lithuanian politician.
- Hédi Temessy, 76, Hungarian actress.

=== 30 ===
- Werner Fricker, 65, German-American soccer player and official.
- Terry Gathercole, 65, Australian Olympic swimmer (1956, 1960), heart problems.
- Inderjit Singh Gill, 79, Indian Army officer.
- Adrian Hastings, 71, British Roman Catholic priest and historian.
- Nikolai Korndorf, 54, Russian-Canadian composer and conductor.
- John Pickering, 56, English footballer.
- Jaime Benítez Rexach, 92, Puerto Rican author, academic and politician.
- Renée Schuurman, 61, South African tennis player.
- Rajko Tomović, 81, Serbian and Yugoslav scientist.
- Denis Whitaker, 86, Canadian athlete, soldier, and author.

=== 31 ===
- Santos Amaro, 93, Cuban baseball player.
- Arlene Francis, 93, American actress, talk show host, and game show panelist (What's My Line?), Alzheimer's disease and cancer.
- Faisal Husseini, 60, Palestinian politician, heart attack.
- Tony Johnson, 76, Australian politician.
- Jagannath Kaushal, 86, Indian politician.
- Kwoh-Ting Li, 91, Taiwanese economist and politician.
- Tex McKenzie, 70, American professional wrestler, abdominal aortic aneurysm.
- Walter E. Rogers, 92, American politician, member of the United States House of Representatives (1951-1967).
- German Ugryumov, 52, Soviet and Russian navy and security services official, heart attack.
- Jorma Valtonen, 78, Finnish Olympic long jumper (1952).
- Rosemary Verey, 82, English garden designer.
