= George Brown (long jumper) =

American long jumper

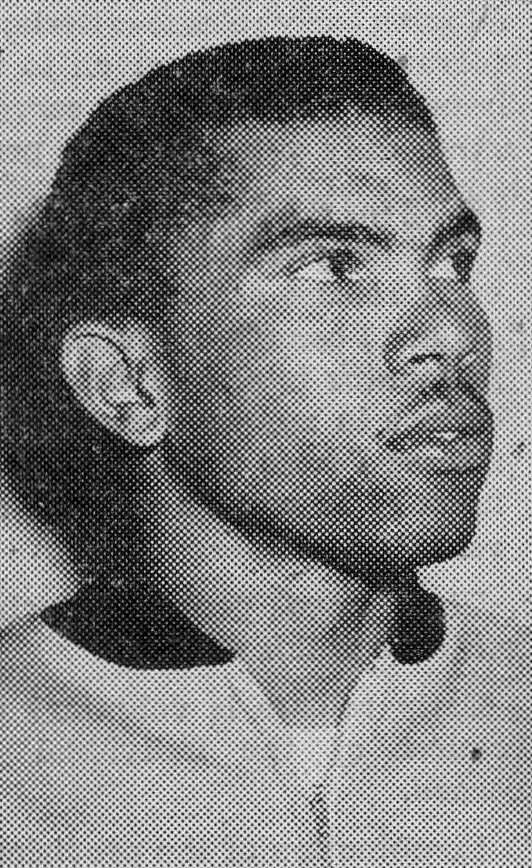
Brown in 1954

George Henry Brown Jr. (July 25, 1931 – July 23, 2018) was an American long jumper. He was the world's best jumper between 1951 and 1953 and the favorite at the 1952 Summer Olympics, but he fouled on all his jumps in the Olympic final.

== Career ==
=== Early career ===
Brown attended Jordan High School in Los Angeles, California, and was unknown as an athlete until his breakthrough in the spring of 1948, his junior year. In addition to long jumping, he was a good sprinter. On April 1, 1949, he jumped 25 ft 2 1/2 in (7.68 m) in a dual meet against Huntington Park High School, breaking Jesse Owens's national high school record of 24 ft 11 1/4 in (7.60 m) from 1933; however, although his record was statistically valid, it didn't receive official NFHS ratification as marks from dual meets were ineligible. Only one athlete of any age, Gay Bryan, exceeded Brown's jump that year, and Track & Field News ranked Brown ninth in the world in its annual rankings. He was Track and Field News "High School Athlete of the Year" in 1949.

Brown graduated from high school that year and went to first Compton Junior College and then UCLA. He failed to improve his personal long jump best in 1950, but in 1951 he became the world's leading jumper, winning the NCAA and United States championships and topping both the world list and the Track & Field News rankings. He went undefeated for the year, with a best jump of 26 ft 1 in (7.95 m) from Tokyo on July 18.

=== 1952 ===
Brown's good form continued in 1952. On May 10 he improved his personal best to 26 ft 3 1/4 in (8.00 m) at the West Coast Relays in Fresno, placing him third on the world all-time list behind Owens and 1948 Olympic champion Willie Steele. At the NCAA championships his winning streak was seriously threatened by Buzz Taylor, but Brown's last-round leap of 25 ft 11 1/8 in (7.90 m) secured him another title and victory. He also successfully defended his title at the national championships, jumping 25 ft 9 in (7.84 m) and defeating runner-up Meredith Gourdine by more than a foot.

Brown entered the 1952 Olympic Trials as a clear favorite. He had won 41 consecutive competitions going back to 1950, and in a coaches' poll ahead of the Trials 29 of 31 respondents predicted that Brown would win. He did not, however, and nearly failed to even make the team; with only one round left, he had a best of 24 ft 7 1/2 in (7.50 m) and was four inches behind Taylor, who held the third and final qualifying spot. On his last jump Brown improved to 25 ft 1 1/2 in (7.66 m), overtaking Taylor by two inches to join Gourdine and Jerome Biffle on the Olympic team.

Despite his third place at the Trials Brown remained the Olympic favorite. At the Olympics in Helsinki he cleared the qualification on his first attempt, jumping 24 ft 1/8 in (7.32 m). In the final, however, he fouled on all of his jumps and failed to register a valid mark; in muddy and slippery conditions most jumpers had problems hitting the board, but Brown and the Netherlands' Henk Visser were the only two to foul out. The other Americans, Biffle and Gourdine, won gold and silver.

Despite his losses at the Trials and the Olympics, Brown still maintained his top spot in the Track & Field News rankings as the best jumper of 1952. He also topped the world list for the second consecutive year, 9 1/8 in (23 cm) ahead of Taylor.

=== Later career ===
Brown joined the U.S. Army in 1953 but remained the world's top jumper, winning the United States championship with a jump of 25 ft 10 3/4 in (7.89 m) and leading both the world list and the Track & Field News rankings for a third consecutive year. In 1954 he was defeated at the national championships by John Bennett and slipped to third behind Bennett and Hungary's Ödön Földessy in the world rankings.

After an off year in 1955 Brown made a comeback in 1956. At the national championships in Bakersfield he jumped 25 ft 5 1/4 m (7.75 m), his best jump since 1953; he took second behind Ernie Shelby and defeated the eventual Olympic champion, Greg Bell, who was third. At the Olympic Trials, however, he only placed 13th with a jump of 23 ft 8 1/4 (7.21 m) and failed to make the Olympic team.

Awards
Preceded by Bob Mathias	Track & Field News High School Boys Athlete of the Year; 1949	Succeeded by Steve Turner
