= 1954 European Athletics Championships – Men's long jump =

Men's long jump at the European Athletics Championships

The men's long jump at the 1954 European Athletics Championships was held in Bern, Switzerland, at Stadion Neufeld on 27 and 28 August 1954.

== Medalists ==
Gold	Ödön Földessy; Hungary
Silver	Zbigniew Iwański; Poland
Bronze	Ernest Wanko; France

== Results ==
=== Final ===
28 August

Rank	Name	Nationality	Result	Notes
1st place, gold medalist(s)	Ödön Földessy	Hungary	7.51	
2nd place, silver medalist(s)	Zbigniew Iwański	Poland	7.46	
3rd place, bronze medalist(s)	Ernest Wanko	France	7.41	
4	Günther Jobst	West Germany	7.38	
5	Vilhelm Porrassalmi	Finland	7.36	
6	Václav Martinek	Czechoslovakia	7.32	
7	Attilio Bravi	Italy	7.25	
8	Janusz Ratajczak	Poland	7.23	
9	Heinz Oberbeck	West Germany	7.20	
10	Jaroslav Fikejz	Czechoslovakia	7.18	
11	Roar Berthelsen	Norway	7.16	
12	Leonid Grigoryev	Soviet Union	7.09	

=== Qualification ===
27 August

Rank	Name	Nationality	Result	Notes
1	Ödön Földessy	Hungary	7.39	Q
2	Václav Martinek	Czechoslovakia	7.36	Q
3	Attilio Bravi	Italy	7.30	Q
4	Heinz Oberbeck	West Germany	7.27	Q
5	Ernest Wanko	France	7.25	Q
6	Vilhelm Porrassalmi	Finland	7.21	Q
7	Jaroslav Fikejz	Czechoslovakia	7.20	Q
8	Zbigniew Iwański	Poland	7.18	Q
9	Janusz Ratajczak	Poland	7.17	Q
10	Leonid Grigoryev	Soviet Union	7.15	Q
11	Günther Jobst	West Germany	7.11	Q
12	Roar Berthelsen	Norway	7.11	Q
13	Viktor Leskevich	Soviet Union	7.07	
14	Jorma Valkama	Finland	7.04	
15	Rade Radovanović	Yugoslavia	7.02	
16	Ion Sorin	Romania	6.93	
17	Roy Cruttenden	Great Britain	6.89	
18	Manuel González	Spain	6.83	
19	Hanspeter Bichsel	Switzerland	6.82	
20	Hans Muchitsch	Austria	6.73	
21	Fritz Pingl	Austria	6.71	
22	Jules Maser	Switzerland	6.70	
23	Tony Mooy	Netherlands	6.66	
24	Erich Ladwein	Saar	6.56	
	Ion Wiesenmayer	Romania	NM	

== Participation ==
According to an unofficial count, 25 athletes from 17 countries participated in the event.

- Austria (2)
- Czechoslovakia (2)
- Finland (2)
- France (1)
- Hungary (1)
- Italy (1)
- Netherlands (1)
- Norway (1)
- Poland (2)
- Romania (2)
- Saar (1)
- Soviet Union (2)
- Spain (1)
- Switzerland (2)
- Great Britain (1)
- West Germany (2)
- Yugoslavia (1)
