= F. Morgan Taylor Jr. =

American athlete and businessman

Frederick Morgan "Buzz" Taylor Jr. (July 13, 1931 – October 29, 2010) was an American athlete and businessman. The son of champion hurdler Morgan Taylor, he ranked fourth in the world in long jump in 1952 and 1953 and played defensive back for Princeton University's football team. After graduating, he became a business executive with Olin Corporation and later Victor Comptometer and then chair and principal owner of AquaVac Systems. He was president of the United States Golf Association in 1998 and 1999.

== Early life ==
Frederick Morgan Taylor Jr. was born on July 13, 1931, in Quincy, Illinois. His father, the elder F. Morgan Taylor, had won Olympic gold and bronze medals in the 400 m hurdles and broken the world record at the 1928 Olympic Trials; he had also placed second to DeHart Hubbard in his son's future event, the long jump, at the 1925 NCAA Championships.

Taylor grew up in Illinois, first Quincy and later Evanston and Skokie in the Chicago area. He acquired a love for golf early on, becoming a caddie at the Evanston Golf Club at age 9 and later joining the greenkeeping crew. He went to high school at Western Military Academy in Alton, Illinois, where he was successful both academically and athletically.

== Sports career ==
Taylor was one of Western Military Academy's top athletes, captaining the track and field team; he also played football and basketball. While the long jump (then usually called the "broad jump") was already his best event, he competed in and won other events for his team, including the sprints, high jump and pole vault. His best jump in 1949 of 22 ft 3 1/2 in (6.79 m) ranked him among the top Illinois high schoolers that year, although it was nowhere close to the national leader, George Brown, who had jumped 25 ft 2 1/2 in (7.68 m) to break Jesse Owens's national high school record from 1933. Taylor graduated from high school in 1949 and went to Princeton University on a scholarship. He played defensive back for a Princeton Tigers football team that went 26–1 over three seasons.

In 1952, his junior year at Princeton, Taylor reached the international top level as a long jumper. In early May he jumped 25 ft 2 3/4 in (7.68 m) in a dual meet against Yale, a new meeting record and Princeton school record. Four weeks later he won the IC4A long jump championship, defeating the previous year's winner, Cornell's Meredith Gourdine. At the NCAA Championships in mid-June he was up against Brown, who had become the world's best jumper. In the last round Taylor jumped 25 ft 6 1/8 in (7.77 m) to take the lead, but Brown responded with a leap of 25 ft 11 1/8 in (7.90 m) and won. Taylor placed second, as his father had done in 1925; his new personal best was good enough to also place him second on the annual world list.

At the national championships Taylor only placed sixth with a jump of 23 ft 8 in (7.21 m), but he was still considered a favorite to quality for the American team for that summer's Olympic Games in Helsinki. In a prediction poll of coaches ahead of the Olympic Trials he ranked second to Brown, ahead of Gourdine and Jerome Biffle; he was the only jumper other than Brown that any coach predicted to win.

The Olympic Trials were held in Los Angeles in late June, with the top three qualifying for the Olympic team. The Trials long jump did not go according to the predictions. After five rounds Biffle was in the lead with 25 ft 2 in (7.67 m), followed by Gourdine; Taylor was in third place with 24 ft 11 1/2 in (7.60 m) and the favorite, Brown, was set to not qualify. As at the NCAA meet, however, Brown came through in the last round, overtaking Taylor by two inches and pushing him out of the team.

Biffle and Gourdine went on to go one-two at the Olympics, while Brown failed to record a valid mark. Track & Field News ranked Taylor No. 4 in the world in its 1952 rankings, behind Brown, Biffle and Gourdine but ahead of all non-American jumpers.

In 1953 Taylor's best jump was 25 ft 5/8 in (7.63 m), his winning mark at the Penn Relays in Philadelphia. He repeated as IC4A champion, and Track & Field News again ranked him fourth in the world.

== Business career ==
After graduating from Princeton in 1953 Taylor served in the U.S. Army for two years as a lieutenant. He married Barbara Olin, daughter of Olin Corporation executive Spencer T. Olin, in June 1954. Taylor's career with his father-in-law's company started in 1955. He went through a number of managerial roles, eventually rising to be general manager of the Olin-owned Winchester recreation products group and a corporate vice president.

Taylor left Olin Corporation in 1974 and joined Victor Comptometer, heading that company's recreation products side. In 1981 he bought AquaVac Systems, Inc., which manufactured robotic pool-cleaners; he remained its chairman and principal owner until his retirement.

== Golf ==
Taylor joined the United States Golf Association's Executive Committee in 1986. He served as the association's secretary, treasurer and vice president before being elected president in 1998.

Taylor was involved in a number of controversies over golf equipment. He was with Victor Comptometer in the 1970s when they introduced the Polara ball, which sought to reduce hooks and slices; the ball was banned by the USGA, leading to a lawsuit. He was a member of the USGA's implement and ball committee in the late 1980s when Karsten Solheim's square-groove clubs led to another controversy and lawsuit, which was eventually settled out of court. Fights over new technology also marked his presidency; he opposed new clubs that enabled longer shots, citing the increasing costs and slower play that would come with longer courses, as well as the game's traditions and integrity and a rule forbidding spring-like effects in clubs. Taylor had the support of other USGA officials, as well as Arnold Palmer and Jack Nicklaus, but Wally Uihlein, a leading club manufacturer, called him an ideologist and a "loose cannon on the ramparts of golf".

Taylor was also a member of the Masters Tournament's rules committee. His son, James, won the U.S. Mid-Amateur Golf Championship in 1989.

== Death ==
Taylor died of lymphoma in his home at Jupiter Island, Florida on October 29, 2010. He was survived by his wife, four sons, three siblings and ten grandchildren.
