= 1950 European Athletics Championships – Men's long jump =

Men's long jump at the European Athletics Championships

The men's long jump at the 1950 European Athletics Championships was held in Brussels, Belgium, at Heysel Stadium on 25 and 26 August 1950.

== Medalists ==
Gold	Torfi Bryngeirsson; Iceland
Silver	Gerard Wessels; Netherlands
Bronze	Jaroslav Fikejz; Czechoslovakia

== Results ==
=== Final ===
26 August

Rank	Name	Nationality	Result	Notes
1st place, gold medalist(s)	Torfi Bryngeirsson	Iceland	7.32	
2nd place, silver medalist(s)	Gerard Wessels	Netherlands	7.22	
3rd place, bronze medalist(s)	Jaroslav Fikejz	Czechoslovakia	7.20	
4	Álvaro Cachulo	Portugal	7.00	
5	Rune Nilsen	Norway	6.96	
6	Fred Hammer	Luxembourg	6.92	
7	Paul Faucher	France	6.81	
8	Boris Brnad	Yugoslavia	6.52	
	Harry Whittle	Great Britain	DNS	

=== Qualification ===
25 August

Rank	Name	Nationality	Result	Notes
1	Álvaro Cachulo	Portugal	7.32	Q
2	Paul Faucher	France	7.22	Q
3	Torfi Bryngeirsson	Iceland	7.20	Q
4	Gerard Wessels	Netherlands	7.17	Q
5	Jaroslav Fikejz	Czechoslovakia	7.10	Q
6	Fred Hammer	Luxembourg	7.02	Q
7	Rune Nilsen	Norway	7.00	Q
8	Harry Whittle	Great Britain	7.00	Q
9	Boris Brnad	Yugoslavia	6.96	Q
10	Walter Lombardi	Italy	6.95	
11	Pierre Knepper	Luxembourg	6.92	
12	Felix Würth	Austria	6.86	
13	Luís García	Portugal	6.78	
14	René Valmy	France	6.72	
15	Harry Askew	Great Britain	6.69	
16	René Libert	Belgium	6.47	
17	Raymond Driesen	Belgium	6.20	

== Participation ==
According to an unofficial count, 17 athletes from 12 countries participated in the event.

- Austria (1)
- Belgium (2)
- Czechoslovakia (1)
- France (2)
- Iceland (1)
- Italy (1)
- Luxembourg (2)
- Netherlands (1)
- Norway (1)
- Portugal (2)
- Great Britain (2)
- Yugoslavia (1)
