= Athletics at the 1952 Summer Olympics – Men's long jump =

Men's long jump at the Games of the XV Olympiad
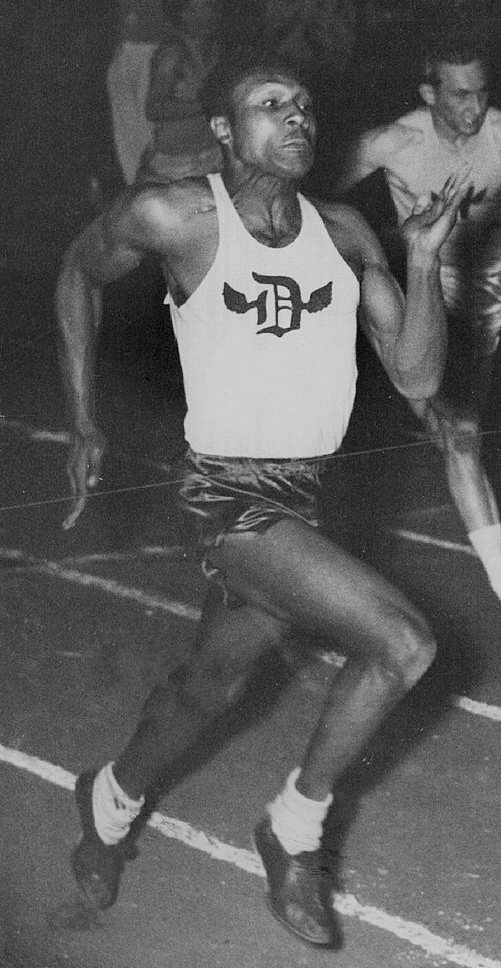
- Jerome Biffle (1950)
- Venue: Helsinki Olympic Stadium
- Date: July 21, 1952
- Competitors: 27 from 19 nations
- Winning distance: 7.57

Medalists
1st place, gold medalist(s)		Jerome Biffle; United States
2nd place, silver medalist(s)		Meredith Gourdine; United States
3rd place, bronze medalist(s)		Ödön Földessy; Hungary

Video on YouTube amateur film

The men's long jump at the 1952 Olympic Games took place on July 21 at the Helsinki Olympic Stadium. Twenty-seven athletes from 19 nations competed. The maximum number of athletes per nation had been set at 3 since the 1930 Olympic Congress. American athlete Jerome Biffle won the gold medal by 4 cm. It was the United States' sixth consecutive and 11th overall victory in the men's long jump. Hungary earned its first long jump medal with Ödön Földessy's bronze.

== Summary ==
In the first round Meredith "Flash" Gourdine took the early lead with a 7.38m. Jerome Biffle, a former NCAA Champion at the University of Denver, was in second place with 7.21m and Ary de Sá was in third with 7.15m. In the second round Ödön Földessy jumped into second place with a 7.23m. In the third round the medals were decided, Gourdine getting a 7.53m to extend his lead, then Biffle carefully came down the runway to leap 7.57 m (24 ft 10 in) to take the lead. That 7.57 would be well within Brown's range but he and Henk Visser failed to get a legal jump in. Biffle also was unable to get another jump in, while Gourdine made three solid attempts but was unable to improve his mark, giving Biffle the gold. Földessy got off a 7.30m in the fifth round to assure himself the bronze medal while de Sá tied Földessy's 7.23 and would have had the tie breaking edge without the 7.30.

== Background ==
This was the 12th appearance of the event, which is one of 12 athletics events to have been held at every Summer Olympics. The only returning finalist from the 1948 Games was eighth-place finisher Felix Würth of Austria. George Brown of the United States came into the Olympics having been the best long jumper in the world for the previous 3 years and the third man to jump 8 meters ever. But Brown's 41 competition win streak ended at the US Olympic Trials, where he barely qualified for Helsinki. In wet conditions, everyone was having trouble with their run up.

Nigeria, Saar, the Soviet Union, Thailand, Turkey, and Venezuela each made their first appearance in the event. The United States appeared for the 12th time, the only nation to have long jumpers at each of the Games thus far.

== Competition format ==
The 1952 competition used a two-round format with a divided final. The qualifying round gave each competitor three jumps to achieve a distance of 7.20 metres; if fewer than 12 men did so, the top 12 (including all those tied) would advance. The final provided each jumper with three jumps; the top six jumpers received an additional three jumps for a total of six, with the best to count (qualifying round jumps were not considered for the final).

== Records ==
Prior to this competition, the existing world and Olympic records were as follows.

World record	Jesse Owens (USA)	8.13	Ann Arbor, United States	25 May 1935
Olympic record	Jesse Owens (USA)	8.06	Berlin, Germany	4 August 1936

No new world or Olympic records were set for this event.

== Schedule ==
All times are Eastern European Summer Time (UTC+3)

Date	Time	Round
Monday, 21 July 1952	10:00; 16:10	Qualifying; Final

== Results ==
=== Qualifying round ===
Qualifying Performance 7.20 (Q) or at least 13 best performers (q) advance to the Final.

Rank	Group	Athlete	Nation	1	2	3	Distance	Notes
1	A	Meredith Gourdine	United States	7.19	7.41	—	7.41	Q
2	A	Jerome Biffle	United States	6.73	7.40	—	7.40	Q
3	B	Neville Price	South Africa	X	7.11	7.36	7.36	Q
4	A	George Brown	United States	7.32	—	—	7.32	Q
5	A	Ödön Földessy	Hungary	7.15	7.25	—	7.25	Q
6	A	Ary de Sá	Brazil	7.24	—	—	7.24	Q
7	B	Henk Visser	Netherlands	7.03	7.21	—	7.21	Q
8	B	Masaji Tajima	Japan	7.04	X	7.13	7.13	q
9	B	Karl-Erik Israelsson	Sweden	5.26	6.98	7.10	7.10	q
10	A	Paul Faucher	France	7.00	6.66	7.10	7.10	q
11	B	Pentti Snellman	Finland	6.89	X	7.09	7.09	q
12	A	Leonid Grigoryev	Soviet Union	7.09	X	X	7.09	q
12	B	Jorma Valtonen	Finland	X	7.09	X	7.09	q
14	B	Carlos Vera	Chile	6.54	6.82	7.07	7.07	
15	B	Felix Würth	Austria	6.99	X	X	6.99	
16	B	Sylvanus Williams	Nigeria	X	6.85	6.98	6.98	
17	B	Jorma Valkama	Finland	6.97	X	X	6.97	
18	B	Karim Olowu	Nigeria	6.84	6.96	6.89	6.96	
19	A	Toni Breder	Saar	6.87	6.68	6.88	6.88	
20	A	Brígido Iriarte	Venezuela	X	—	6.82	6.82	
21	A	Henryk Grabowski	Poland	6.72	X	6.77	6.77	
22	A	Nikolay Andryushchenko	Soviet Union	X	6.74	X	6.74	
23	B	Geraldo de Oliveira	Brazil	X	6.42	6.71	6.71	
24	B	Pat Leane	Australia	6.35	6.40	5.18	6.40	
25	B	Kamtorn Sanidwong	Thailand	5.31	4.43	X	5.31	
—	A	Avni Akgün	Turkey	X	X	X	No mark	
—	B	Khandadash Madatov	Soviet Union	X	X	X	No mark	
—	A	José Julio Barillas	Guatemala	DNS				
—	A	Boris Brnad	Yugoslavia	DNS				
—	A	Francisco Castro	Puerto Rico	DNS				
—	A	Asnoldo Devonish	Venezuela	DNS				
—	A	Álvaro Dias	Portugal	DNS				
—	A	Roy Fearon	Guatemala	DNS				
—	A	Paulino Ferrer	Venezuela	DNS				
—	B	Günther Jobst	Germany	DNS				
—	B	Sebastián Junqueras	Spain	DNS				
—	B	Mikhail Mikhail	Greece	DNS				
—	B	Vasilios Sakellarakis	Greece	DNS				

=== Final ===
Rank	Athlete	Nation	1	2	3	4	5	6	Distance
1st place, gold medalist(s)	Jerome Biffle	United States	7.21	X	7.57	X	X	X	7.57
2nd place, silver medalist(s)	Meredith Gourdine	United States	7.38	6.58	7.53	7.49	7.36	7.51	7.53
3rd place, bronze medalist(s)	Ödön Földessy	Hungary	7.04	7.23	X	7.17	7.30	7.12	7.30
4	Ary de Sá	Brazil	7.15	6.77	7.06	7.22	7.20	7.23	7.23
5	Jorma Valtonen	Finland	X	7.06	7.16	X	X	6.97	7.16
6	Leonid Grigoryev	Soviet Union	x	7.14	6.92	5.55	x	6.67	7.14
7	Karl-Erik Israelsson	Sweden	X	X	7.10	Did not advance			7.10
8	Paul Faucher	France	X	6.96	7.02	Did not advance			7.02
9	Pentti Snellman	Finland	X	6.88	7.02	Did not advance			7.02
10	Masaji Tajima	Japan	X	7.00	X	Did not advance			7.00
11	Neville Price	South Africa	6.40	X	X	Did not advance			6.40
—	George Brown	United States	X	X	X	Did not advance			No mark
—	Henk Visser	Netherlands	X	X	X	Did not advance			No mark
