= William John Wunderlich =

American state legislator (1906–c.1976)

William John Winderlich Sr. (August 27, 1906 - c. 1976) was a state legislator and merchant in Arkansas. A Democrat, he served two terms in the Arkansas House of Representatives in 1943 and 1945. He lived in Blytheville in Mississippi County, Arkansas. He married Donna Cooke and had two children.

He was born in Springfield, Missouri. He attended Western Military Academy and the University of Missouri. A Methodist, he served in the Lions Club and Chamber of Commerce.
