= Toni Breder =

German long jumper

Personal information
- Nationality: German
- Born: 18 November 1925 Saarlouis, Saarland, Germany
- Died: 5 August 1989 (aged 63) Saarbrücken, Saarland, Germany

Sport
- Sport: Athletics
- Event: Long jump
- Club: SV Saar 05

Anton Michel Breder (18 November 1925 – 5 August 1989) was a German athlete. He competed in the men's long jump at the 1952 Summer Olympics, representing Saar.

Breder finished third behind Sylvanus Williams in the long jump event at the British 1952 AAA Championships.
