= Biffle =

Biffle (/ˈbɪfəl/) is a surname. Notable people with the surname include:

- Greg Biffle (1969–2025), American racing driver
- Jerome Biffle (1928–2002), American athlete
