= Lorenzo Wright =

American sprinter

Medal record

Men's athletics

Representing the United States

Olympic Games
Gold medal – first place	1948 London	4 × 100 metres relay

Lorenzo Christopher Wright (December 9, 1926 – March 27, 1972) was an American athlete. A Detroit native, he started at Miller High School and Wayne State University; Wright is renowned for his noteworthy track and field accomplishments.

== World-Class Athlete ==
Lorenzo C. Wright's crowning athletic achievement would come as a member of the gold medal winning 4 × 100 meter relay team at the 1948 Olympic Games. During those same London Games, Wright finished fourth in a fiercely contested long jump competition. Willie Steele of the U.S. won the gold medal at 25 feet 8 inches (7.825 m); Australia's Theo Bruce came in second, taking the silver medal at 24 feet 9 1/2 inches (7.555 m). Herb Douglas of the United States captured the bronze medal with a jump of 24 feet 9 inches (7.545 m), and Lorenzo Wright ended up in fourth place at 24 feet 5 1/4 inches (7.45 m) – a hand's width from a second trip to the medals podium.

At Miller High, Wright was a two-time Detroit Public Secondary Schools Athletic League champion in the long jump. Upon graduating from high school, LC Wright served eighteen months in the U.S. Army. Then, as a student-athlete for Wayne State University, Wright was an NCAA All-American in 1947 and 1948; placing second and third respectively in the long jump. Lorenzo Wright was a Central Collegiate Conference indoor champion in the 60-yard dash; he was also the inaugural Mid-American Conference titlist in the 100 and 220-yard dash, 220-yard low hurdles, and the long jump. During his career, Wright won two individual and two relay squad titles at the prestigious Penn Relays. Wright also won the long jump event at the 1948 and 1952 National AAU Championships.

Wright's indoor and outdoor long jump marks, along with his performances in the 100-meter and 220-yard dash, are still Wayne State University varsity records – having stood the test of time for nearly seventy years.

== Dedicated Coach and Administrator ==
Following his athletic career, L.C. Wright served many seasons as the track and swimming coach at Miller, Eastern and Southwestern High School; during the 1960s, Wright's athletes were some of the best in the United States. Wright was later appointed Director of the Detroit Public Secondary Schools Athletic League (DPSSAL). Wright was honored posthumously as a 1973 inductee to the Michigan Sports Hall of Fame and -in 1976- as a charter member of the Wayne State University Athletic Hall of Fame.

One of Detroit's major interscholastic athletic facilities, adjacent to Martin Luther King High School, is named Lorenzo C. Wright Field.

== Death ==
In 1972, at age 45, Wright was stabbed to death in his Detroit home by his wife Elizabeth during a dispute about their possible separation.

== Resources ==
- 1948 Summer Olympics
- Wayne State University
