= Herb Douglas =

American long jumper (1922–2023)

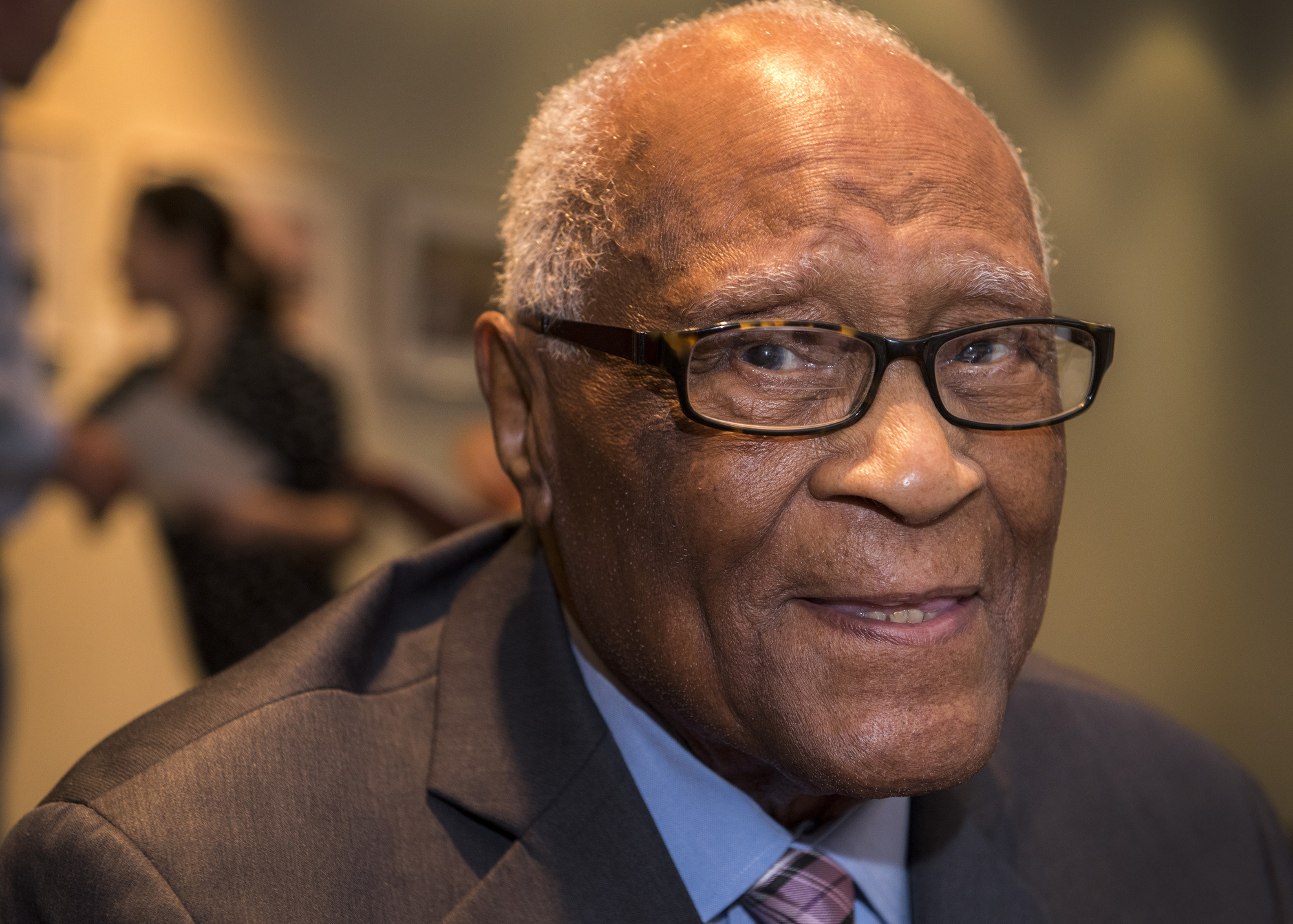
- Douglas in 2018

Medal record

Men's athletics

Representing United States

Olympic Games
Bronze medal – third place	1948 London	Long jump

Herbert Paul Douglas Jr. (March 9, 1922 – April 22, 2023) was an American athlete who competed mainly in the long jump. He was the oldest living U.S. Olympic medalist prior to his death at the age of 101.

== Early life and education ==
Douglas graduated from Taylor Allderdice High School in Pittsburgh, Pennsylvania, in 1940. He was Allderdice's first black basketball player.

Douglas first attended Xavier University of Louisiana in 1942, and competed at the 48th Annual Penn Relays in Philadelphia, Pennsylvania, helping Xavier win the American Quarter-Mile Relay Championship. He also competed in college at the University of Pittsburgh and was inducted into the inaugural class of their sports hall of fame in 2018. Douglas was a member of Alpha Phi Omega service fraternity.

== Olympics ==
Douglas represented the U.S. in the long jump at the 1948 Summer Olympics in London, where he won the bronze medal with a jump of 24 feet 9 inches (7.54 m). Willie Steele of the United States won the gold medal with 25 feet 8 inches (7.82 m) and Australia's Theo Bruce took the silver medal with 24 feet 9.5 inches (7.56 m). Prior to the 2012 Summer Olympics Douglas was recognized as the oldest living African-American Olympic medalist.

== Later life ==
Douglas turned 100 in March 2022, and died in Pittsburgh on April 22, 2023, at the age of 101. Douglas was inducted into the Taylor Allderdice High School alumni hall of fame in 2009.
