= Gallage Peiris =

Sri Lankan athletics competitor

Personal information
- Full name: Gallage Diamond Peiris
- Nationality: Sri Lankan
- Born: 17 January 1918
- Died: April 2004 (aged 86)

Sport
- Sport: Athletics
- Events: Long jump Triple jump

Gallage Diamond Peiris (17 January 1918 – April 2004) was a Sri Lankan athlete. He competed in the men's long jump and the men's triple jump at the 1948 Summer Olympics.
