= Athletics at the 1948 Summer Olympics – Men's long jump =

Men's long jump at the Games of the XIV Olympiad
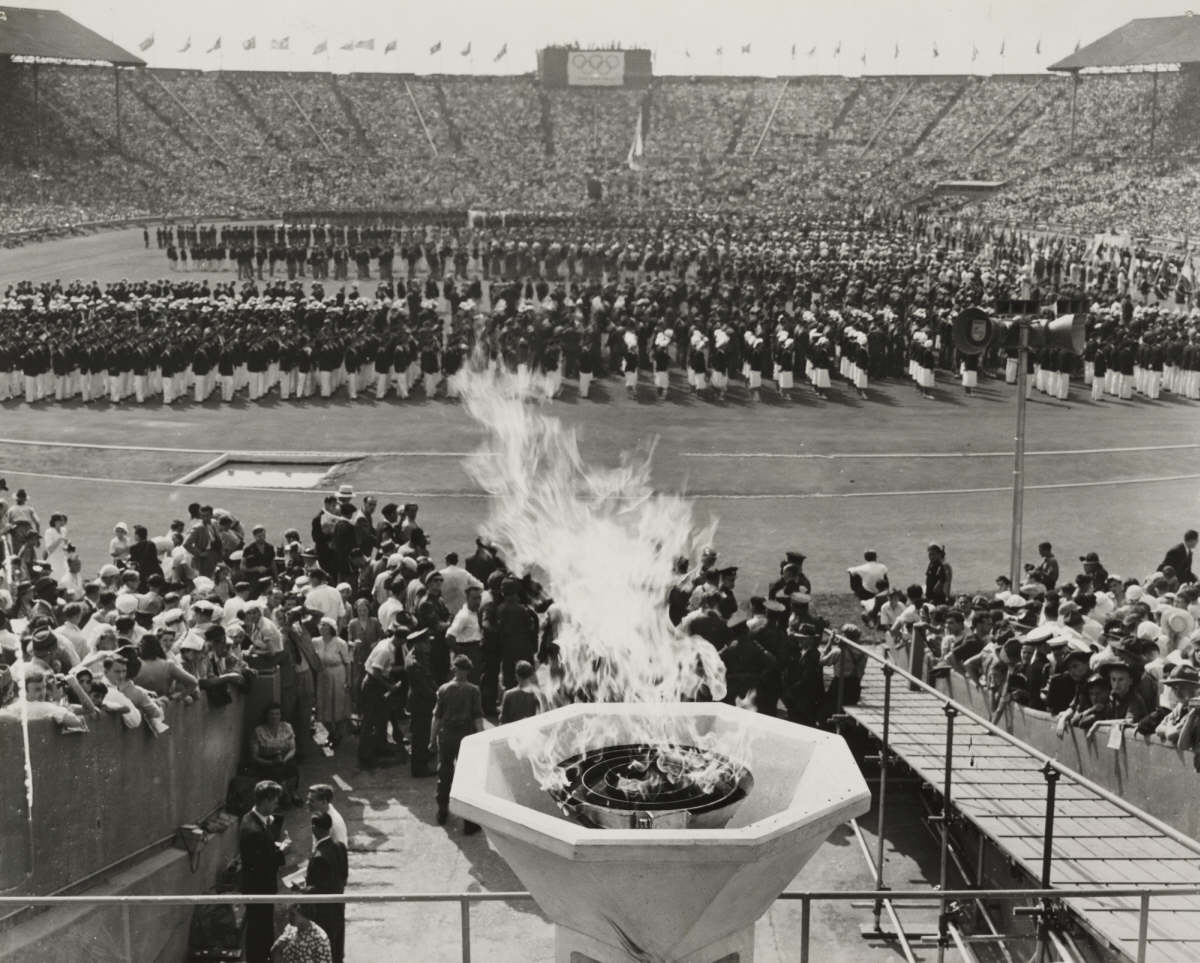
- Olympic Stadium (during opening ceremony)
- Venue: Wembley Stadium
- Date: July 31, 1948 (qualifying and final)
- Competitors: 21 from 17 nations
- Winning distance: 7.825

Medalists
1st place, gold medalist(s)		Willie Steele; United States
2nd place, silver medalist(s)		Theo Bruce; Australia
3rd place, bronze medalist(s)		Herb Douglas; United States

Video on YouTube Official Video @ 19:25

The men's long jump event was part of the track and field athletics programme at the 1948 Summer Olympics. The competition was held on July 31, 1948. Twenty-one athletes from 17 nations competed. The maximum number of athletes per nation had been set at 3 since the 1930 Olympic Congress. The final was won by 27 cm by American Willie Steele. It was the United States' fifth consecutive and tenth overall gold medal in the men's long jump. Theo Bruce won Australia's first long jump medal with his silver.

== Background ==
This was the 11th appearance of the event, which is one of 12 athletics events to have been held at every Summer Olympics. None of the jumpers from the pre-war 1936 Games returned. Willie Steele was the favorite; he had won the 1946 and 1947 AAU championships as well as the 1948 U.S. Olympic trials (nearly breaking Jesse Owens's world record, fouling on his would-be record jump). However, Steele came into London with an injured ankle.

Ceylon, Guyana, Iceland, South Korea, and Portugal each made their first appearance in the event. The United States appeared for the 11th time, the only nation to have long jumpers at each of the Games thus far.

== Competition format ==
The 1948 competition used a two-round format that took aspects from both the pre-1936 formats and the unusual three-round 1936 tournament. The qualifying round gave each competitor three jumps to achieve a distance of 7.20 metres; if fewer than 12 men did so, the top 12 (including all those tied) would advance. The final provided each jumper with six jumps, with the best to count (qualifying round jumps were not considered for the final).

== Records ==
Prior to the competition, the existing World and Olympic records were as follows.

World record	Jesse Owens (USA)	8.13	Ann Arbor, United States	25 May 1935
Olympic record	Jesse Owens (USA)	8.06	Berlin, Germany	4 August 1936

No new world or Olympic records were set during the competition.

== Schedule ==
All times are British Summer Time (UTC+1)

Date	Time	Round
Friday, 31 July 1948	11:00; 16:45	Qualifying; Finals

== Results ==
=== Qualifying ===
Qual. rule: qualification standard 7.20m (Q) or at least best 12 qualified (q).

Rank	Group	Athlete	Nation	1	2	3	Distance	Notes
1	B	Willie Steele	United States	7.780	–	–	7.780	Q
2	B	Lorenzo Wright	United States	7.530	–	–	7.530	Q
3	A	Herb Douglas	United States	7.240	–	–	7.240	Q
4	A	Theo Bruce	Australia	7.200	–	–	7.200	Q
5	A	Enrique Kistenmacher	Argentina	7.180	X	7.100	7.180	q
6	A	Harry Askew	Great Britain	7.140	6.810	7.070	7.140	q
7	A	Adegboyega Folaranmi Adedoyin	Great Britain	7.130	7.030	6.960	7.130	q
8	B	Felix Würth	Austria	7.080	6.980	6.950	7.080	q
9	A	Edward Adamczyk	Poland	5.070	7.030	7.030	7.030	q
10	B	Harry Whittle	Great Britain	6.560	7.030	6.930	7.030	q
11	B	Baldev Singh	India	X	7.000	6.780	7.000	q
12	A	Georges Damitio	France	6.980	6.770	6.610	6.980	q
13	B	Jean Studer	Switzerland	6.820	6.880	6.940	6.940	
14	B	Finnbjörn Þorvaldsson	Iceland	X	X	6.860	6.860	
15	A	Jaroslav Fikejz	Czechoslovakia	6.560	6.860	6.790	6.860	
16	B	Álvaro Dias	Portugal	6.460	6.780	6.860	6.860	
17	A	Kyros Marinis	Greece	X	X	6.750	6.750	
18	A	Kim Won-kwon	South Korea	6.710	X	X	6.710	
19	B	Charles Thompson	Guyana	6.580	—	—	6.580	
20	A	Jorge Aguirre	Mexico	5.910	X	X	5.910	
21	B	Gallage Peiris	Ceylon	X	X	X	No mark	
—	—	Gordon George Avery	Australia	DNS				
—	—	Lionel Fournier	Canada	DNS				
—	—	Peter Mullins	Australia	DNS				
—	—	Geraldo de Oliveira	Brazil	DNS				
—	—	Jack Parry	Canada	DNS				
—	—	René Valmy	France	DNS				

=== Final ===
Results of individual jumps are not known other than for Steele. Steele's first jump was 7.825 metres and his second 7.680 metres; he did not take any further jumps. Steele's result was the best non-wind-assisted jump in Olympic history.

Rank	Athlete	Nation	Distance
1st place, gold medalist(s)	Willie Steele	United States	7.825
2nd place, silver medalist(s)	Theo Bruce	Australia	7.555
3rd place, bronze medalist(s)	Herb Douglas	United States	7.545
4	Lorenzo Wright	United States	7.450
5	Adegboyega Folaranmi Adedoyin	Great Britain	7.270
6	Georges Damitio	France	7.070
7	Harry Whittle	Great Britain	7.030
8	Felix Würth	Austria	7.000
9	Harry Askew	Great Britain	6.935
10	Enrique Kistenmacher	Argentina	6.800
11	Edward Adamczyk	Poland	6.735
—	Baldev Singh	India	DNS
