= Khandadash Madatov =

Azerbaijani long jumper

Personal information
- Nationality: Azerbaijani
- Born: 14 March 1925 Astara, Azerbaijan SSR, Soviet Union
- Died: 13 July 1987 (aged 62)

Sport
- Sport: Athletics
- Event: Long jump

Khandadash Kazim oglu Madatov (Azerbaijani: Xandadaş Kazım oğlu Mədətov; 14 March 1925 — 13 July 1987) was an Azerbaijani athlete. He competed in the men's long jump at the 1952 Summer Olympics, representing the Soviet Union. Madatov was named Master of Sport of the USSR in 1949.

He was the Soviet Union champion in 1950 (7.15 m) and the record holder of the Soviet Union in 1952 (7.50 m) in long jump. He was also bronze medalist at the 2nd World Festival of Youth and Students in Budapest, Hungary.

From 1947 to 1958, Khandadash Madatov worked as a coach in the Dynamo Sports Society.

From 1959, he had worked as the head lecturer of the Department of Athletics at the Azerbaijan State Academy of Physical Education and Sport.
