= Sylvanus Williams =

Nigerian long jumper (1922–2006)

Personal information
- Nationality: Nigerian
- Born: 16 September 1922 Abeokuta, British Nigeria
- Died: 28 October 2006 (aged 84) Winnipeg, Canada
- Height: 173 cm (5 ft 8 in)
- Weight: 73 kg (161 lb)

Sport
- Sport: Athletics
- Event: Long jump
- Club: University of Glasgow AC

Sylvanus Olatunde Williams (16 September 1922 – 28 October 2006) was a Nigerian athlete who competed at the 1952 Summer Olympics.

== Biography ==
Williams finished third behind Bill Bruce in the long jump event at the 1948 AAA Championships. Shortly afterwards he represented Nigeria at the 1948 Olympic Games in London, in the men's long jump competition.

Williams would go on to twice win the British AAA Championships title at the 1951 AAA Championships and the 1952 AAA Championships.
