= Pentti Snellman =

Finnish long jumper

Personal information
- Nationality: Finnish
- Born: 18 February 1926 Pori, Finland
- Died: 14 October 2007 (aged 81) Hendersonville, North Carolina, United States

Sport
- Sport: Athletics
- Event: Long jump

Pentti O. Snellman (18 February 1926 – 14 October 2007) was a Finnish athlete. He competed in the men's long jump at the 1952 Summer Olympics. Snellmann married Aili Annikki Pekkanen (1931–2020) in 1960. Snellman practiced medicine in Finland for ten years and in the United States from 1972 until his retirement in 1991.
