= Murray S. Hoffman =

American cardiologist (1924–2018)

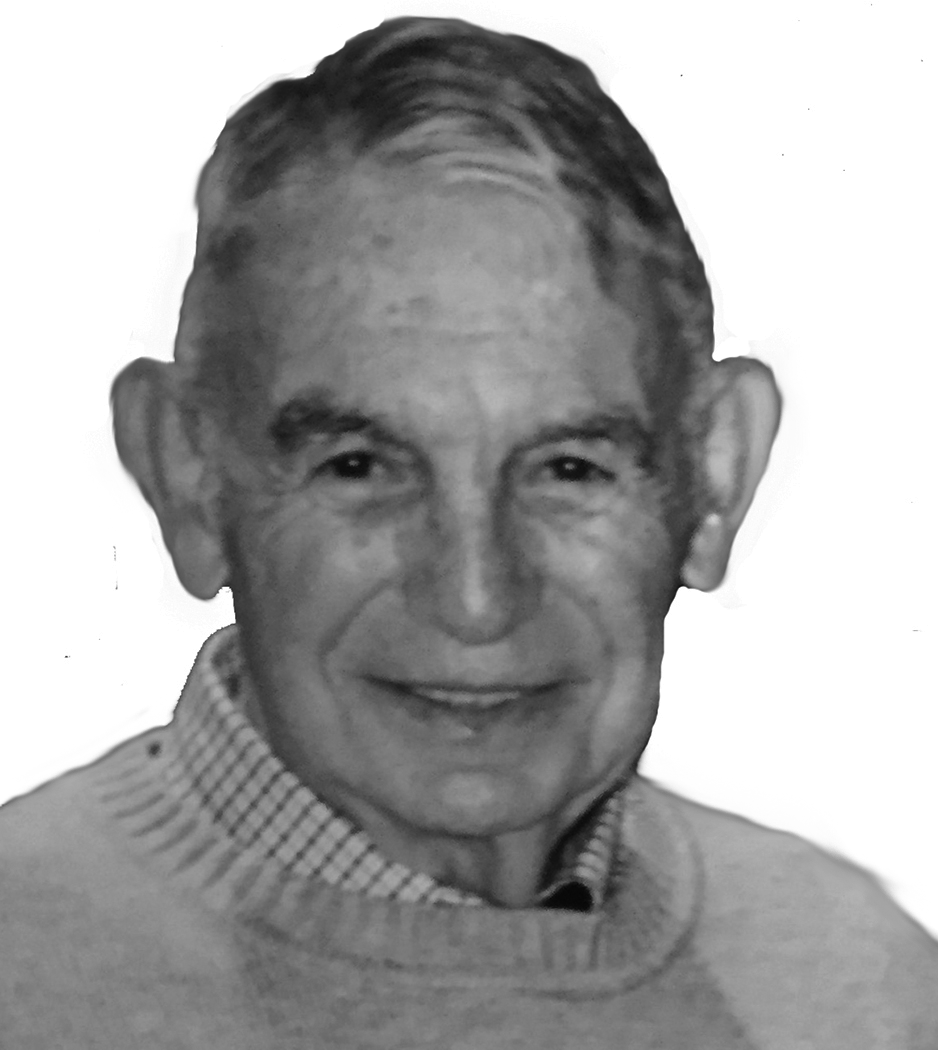
Hoffman in 2016

Murray Stanley Hoffman (April 15, 1924 – March 23, 2018) was an American cardiologist, educator and diplomate of the American Board of Internal Medicine and the American Board of Cardiovascular Disease, a Fellow of the American College of Cardiology and a member of the Council on Clinical Cardiology (CLCD) of the American Heart Association.

== Career ==
Hoffman trained as a cardiologist at the Mayo Clinic, at the time that Earl Wood and colleagues were perfecting heart catheterization and investigating the means of cardiac bypass to allow for open heart surgery, and these methods were adopted early at the National Jewish Hospital (Denver), with Hoffman as chief of cardiology. Motivated by the ability to now treat congenital heart disease, enabled through the use of the cardiac bypass pump, Hoffman was part of a team of physicians who introduced the use of the single lead electrocardiogram to screen school children. Maintaining his close ties with the Mayo Clinic, Hoffman is a founding member of the Doctors Mayo Society and served as president of the National Mayo Alumni Association from 1977 to 1979. As co-chair of the Colorado Heart Association Preventative Cardiology-Exercise Committee, he (together with his wife, Eleanor, Jerome Biffle, a 1952 Olympic Gold Medalist and Marilyn Van Derbur, 1958 Miss America) introduced one of the earliest jogging programs for heart health, and Hoffman served as the president of the Colorado Heart Association from 1975 to 1976. In addition, Hoffman was a member of the Board of Trustees of the American College of Cardiology. Throughout his career he authored / co-authored 23 publications (listed below) in the field of clinical cardiology.

- 1941: Graduated summa cum laude from East High School (Denver)
- 1943: Received BA Degree from the University of Denver
- 1943–1947: Sponsored by the U.S. Navy, attended University of Colorado School of Medicine on an accelerated 3-year program and graduated 1st in his class
- 1947–1949: Served his internship and Medical residency at the University of Cincinnati (Cincinnati, Ohio)
- 1949–1951: Served his fellowship in cardiology and Internal medicine at the Mayo Clinic (Rochester, Minnesota)
- 1951: Certified by the American Board of Internal Medicine and the Sub-specialty Board of Cardiology
- 1951–1953: Served in the United States Public Health Service (during Korean War)
- 1954: Received the degree of Master of Science in Medicine from the University of Minnesota (affiliated, at the time, with the Mayo Clinic)
- 1953–1990: Maintained a private practice of cardiology (Denver, Colorado)
- 1955–1968: Chief of Cardiology, National Jewish Hospital (half time position); member of the National Jewish Hospital's open heart surgery program (Denver, Colorado)
- 1975–1976: President, Colorado Heart Association
- 1975–1979: Trustee of the American College of Cardiology
- 1977–1979: President, National Mayo Clinic Alumni Association
- 1985: American College of Cardiology manpower advisory committee
- 1990–2002: Closed private practice and joined the faculty of the University of Colorado School of Medicine where he was rapidly promoted to Professor of Medicine and Cardiology (Denver, Colorado)
- 2002: Retired
- 2018: Died in Denver, Colorado at Rose Medical Center March 23

== Publications ==
- Zylberberg, B.; Kass, I.; Hoffman, M. S. (1959-11-01). "Atrial septal defect experiences in the clinical evaluation of 15 consecutive cases of the secundum variety". The American Journal of the Medical Sciences. 238 (5): 573–583. doi:10.1097/00000441-195911000-00007. ISSN 0002-9629. PMID 13847997. S2CID 39208234.
- Caldini, P.; Gensini, G. G.; Hoffman, M. S. (1959-10-01). "Primary pulmonary hypertension with death during right heart catheterization. A case report and a survey of reported fatalities". The American Journal of Cardiology. 4 (4): 519–527. doi:10.1016/0002-9149(59)90175-4. ISSN 0002-9149. PMID 13806909.
- Martinez, J. B.; Kass, I.; Hoffman, M. S. (1959-09-01). "Pitfalls in the evaluation of the patient with mitral stenosis for surgery: an illustrated case report". American Practitioner and Digest of Treatment. 10: 1489–1496. PMID 14421798.
- Griffin, J. T.; Kass, I.; Hoffman, M. S. (1959-07-01). "Cor pulmonale associated with symptoms and signs of asthma in children". Pediatrics. 24 (1): 54–64. doi:10.1542/peds.24.1.54. ISSN 0031-4005. PMID 13667335. S2CID 39994824.
- Wittenstein, G. J.; Grow, J. B.; Hoffman, M. S.; Gensini, G. G.; Denst, J. (1959-06-01). "Myxoma of the left atrium simulating pure mitral insufficiency; report of a case with successful removal". Surgery. 45 (6): 981–991. ISSN 0039-6060. PMID 13659341.
- Morton, W.; Hoffman, M. S.; Cleere, R. L.; Dodge, H. J. (1959-03-14). "Comparison of three methods of screening for pediatric heart disease". Journal of the American Medical Association. 169 (11): 1169–1172. doi:10.1001/jama.1959.03000280021006. ISSN 0002-9955. PMID 13630738.
- Martinez, J. B.; Kass, I.; Hoffman, M. S. (1958-11-01). "Factors involved in the recovery of a patient after prolonged ventricular fibrillation during hypothermia". The Journal of Thoracic Surgery. 36 (5): 749–756. doi:10.1016/S0096-5588(20)30120-3. ISSN 0096-5588. PMID 13588728.
- Hoffman, M. S.; Forrest, J.; Garlett, E. L. (1958-05-01). "Coronary embolism and acute myocardial infarction secondary to rheumatic heart disease". Diseases of the Chest. 33 (5): 546–550. doi:10.1378/chest.33.5.546. ISSN 0096-0217. PMID 13524100.
- Morton, W.; Lloyd, L.; Dodge, H. J.; Hoffman, M. S. (1958-05-01). "Use of a single-lead ECG in the detection of congenital heart disease". A.M.A. Journal of Diseases of Children. 95 (5): 492–497. doi:10.1001/archpedi.1958.02060050496006. ISSN 0096-6916. PMID 13520142.
- Mandel, William; Hoffman, M. S.; Heitzman, G. H.; Kass, I. (2016-11-21). "Endocarditis Following Ventricular Septal Defect Repair". California Medicine. 88 (3): 248–249. ISSN 0008-1264. PMC 1512408. PMID 13511221.
- Golberg, M.; Heitzman, G.; Kass, I.; Grow, J. B.; Hoffman, M. S. (1957-12-01). "Persistent truncus arteriosus; an unusual type of congenital heart disease". Rocky Mountain Medical Journal. 54 (12): 1303–1306. ISSN 0035-760X. PMID 13485914.
- Duman, L. J.; Githens, J. H.; Hoffman, M. S. (1957-07-27). "Role of bed rest in treatment of rheumatic fever; review of literature and survey of current opinions". Journal of the American Medical Association. 164 (13): 1435–1438. doi:10.1001/jama.1957.02980130011003. ISSN 0002-9955. PMID 13448889.
- Blount, S. G.; Munyan, E. A.; Hoffman, M. S. (1957-05-01). "Hypertrophy of the right ventricular outflow tract: a concept of the electrocardiographic findings in atrial septal defect". The American Journal of Medicine. 22 (5): 784–790. doi:10.1016/0002-9343(57)90128-6. ISSN 0002-9343. PMID 13410967.
- Green, T. F.; Kass, I.; Hoffman, M. S. (1964-06-01). "Ventricular Septal Defects". Rocky Mountain Medical Journal. 61: 31–36. ISSN 0035-760X. PMID 14157790.
- Wassermil, M.; Hoffman, M. S. (1962-12-01). "Partial anomalous pulmonary venous drainage associated with mitral stenosis with an intact atrial septum. A distinctive hemodynamic syndrome". The American Journal of Cardiology. 10 (6): 894–899. doi:10.1016/0002-9149(62)90191-1. ISSN 0002-9149. PMID 13999057.
- Miyamoto, T.; Bastaroli, J.; Hoffman, M. S. (1961-10-01). "Electrocardiographic changes in induced bronchial asthma". Japanese Heart Journal. 2 (4): 524–537. doi:10.1536/ihj.2.524. ISSN 0021-4868. PMID 14474818.
- Zylberberg, B.; Kass, I.; Grow, J. B.; Hoffman, M. S. (1961-04-01). "Thromboembolic complications following insertion of the Hufnagel prosthesis". The Journal of Thoracic and Cardiovascular Surgery. 41 (4): 492–497. doi:10.1016/S0022-5223(20)31679-2. ISSN 0022-5223. PMID 13789059.
- Pirincci, A.; Kass, I.; Denst, J.; Hoffman, M. S. (1961-03-01). "Severe reactive pulmonary hypertension secondary to aortic stenosis". The American Journal of the Medical Sciences. 241 (3): 343–349. doi:10.1097/00000441-196103000-00009. ISSN 0002-9629. PMID 13736000. S2CID 44640913.
- Miyamoto, T.; Kass, I.; Hoffman, M. S. (1960-07-01). "Electrocardiogram in asthmatic children". Circulation. 22: 90–95. doi:10.1161/01.cir.22.1.90. ISSN 0009-7322. PMID 14423079.
- Newman MM, Hoffman MS, Gesink MH (1967). "Mechanical failure of Starr-Edwards aortic prosthesis due to ball fracture". J Thorac Cardiovasc Surg. 53 (3): 398–400. doi:10.1016/s0022-5223(19)43205-4. PMID 6019152.
- Shapiro, A. P.; Baker, H. M.; Hoffman, M. S.; Ferris, E. B. (1951-01-01). "Pharmacologic and physiologic studies of a case of pheochromocytoma". The American Journal of Medicine. 10 (1): 115–130. doi:10.1016/0002-9343(51)90235-5. ISSN 0002-9343. PMID 14799505.
- Hoffman, M. S.; Wellman, W. E.; Herrell, W. E. (1950-08-02). "Failure of absorption of aureomycin and terramycin administered as a retention enema". Proceedings of the Staff Meetings of the Mayo Clinic. 25 (16): 463–464. ISSN 0092-699X. PMID 15430470.
- Hoffman, M. S. (1947-07-01). "The etiology of arteriosclerosis". MD (Chicago, Illinois). 2 (7): 13–16. PMID 20255816.
- Hoffman, M. S.; Wellman, W. E.; Sayre, G. P. (1951-01-03). "Escherichia coli endocarditis: Report of case". Proceedings of the Staff Meetings of the Mayo Clinic. 26 (1): 1–8. ISSN 0092-699X. PMID 14808432.
