= Bill Bruce (athlete) =

Australian long jumper (1923–2002)

Bil Bruce
Personal information
- Born: 28 July 1923 Adelaide, South Australia
- Died: 1 August 2002 (aged 79)
- Height: 178 cm (5 ft 10 in)
- Weight: 70 kg (154 lb)

Sport
- Sport: Athletics
- Event: high jump/long jump
- Club: Western Districts AC
Medal record
Men's athletics
Representing Australia
Olympic Games
Silver medal – second place	1948 London	Long jump

Theodore William Bruce (28 July 1923 – 1 August 2002) was an Australian athlete who mainly competed in the men's long jump. He represented Australia at the 1948 Summer Olympics in London, where he won the silver medal in his specialty.

Competition in the long jump was particularly keen at the London Games. Willie Steele of the U.S. won the gold medal at 25' 8"; Theo Bruce came in second, taking the silver medal at 24' 9.5". Herb Douglas captured the bronze with a jump of 24' 9", and Lorenzo Wright of the United States ended up fourth at 24' 5.25". Bruce also competed as a member of the Australian 4 × 100 m relay team which did not qualify for the final.

Bruce won the British AAA Championships title in the long jump event at the 1948 AAA Championships.
