= Nikolay Andryushchenko =

Soviet long jumper

Personal information
- Full name: Nikolay Fyodorovich Andryushchenko
- Nationality: Soviet
- Born: 24 February 1931

Sport
- Sport: Athletics
- Event: Long jump

Nikolay Andryushchenko (born 24 February 1931) is a Soviet athlete. He competed in the men's long jump at the 1952 Summer Olympics.
