= Torfi Bryngeirsson =

Icelandic athlete (1926–1995)

Personal information
- Born: 11 November 1926 Búastaðir, Vestmannaeyjar, Kingdom of Iceland
- Died: 16 July 1995 (aged 68) Reykjavík, Iceland
- Height: 178 cm (5 ft 10 in)
- Weight: 72 kg (159 lb)

Sport
- Sport: Athletics
- Events: Pole vault, Long jump
- Club: Knattspyrnufélag Reykjavíkur
Medal record
Men's athletics
Representing Iceland
European Championships
| Gold medal – first place | 1950 Brussels | Long jump |

Torfi Bryngeirsson (11 November 1926 – 16 July 1995) was an Icelandic athlete who competed in the 1948 Summer Olympics and in the 1952 Summer Olympics. In 1950, he won gold in long jump at the European Athletics Championships.

== Biography ==
Torfi was born in Búastaðar on 11 November 1926 and represented Iceland at the 1948 Olympic Games in London.

He won the British AAA Championships title in the pole vault event at the 1951 AAA Championships. He represented Iceland at the 1952 Olympic Games in Helsinki, competing in the pole vault again.

He died in Reykjavík on 16 July 1995, aged 68.

In 2015, Torfi was posthumously inducted in to the National Olympic and Sports Association of Iceland Hall of Fame.
