= Kamtorn Sanidwong =

Thai music educator

- Born: 6 September 1924
- Died: 22 November 2000 (aged 76)
- Occupation: Music educator
- Known for: Introduction of classical music education in Thai higher education

Kamtorn Sanidwong na Ayudhya (Thai: กำธร สนิทวงศ์ ณ อยุธยา, RTGS: Kamthon Sanitwong na Ayutthaya, 6 September 1925 – 22 November 2000) was a Thai music educator. He pioneered the introduction of Western art music (classical music) education in Thai universities, particularly at the Chulalongkorn University's Faculty of Education, where he was an assistant professor. He was also an athlete, and competed in the men's long jump at the 1952 Summer Olympics.
