= Kyros Marinis =

Greek long jumper (born 1928)

Personal information
- Nationality: Greek
- Born: 1928 Alexandria, Egypt

Sport
- Sport: Athletics
- Event: Long jump

Kyros Marinis (born 1928) is a Greek former athlete. He competed in the men's long jump at the 1948 Summer Olympics.
