= Álvaro Dias (athlete) =

Portuguese long jumper

Personal information
- Nationality: Portuguese
- Born: 14 January 1923 Coimbra, Portugal
- Died: 24 February 2005 (aged 82)

Sport
- Sport: Athletics
- Event: Long jump

Álvaro Dias (14 January 1923 – 24 February 2005) was a Portuguese athlete. He competed in the men's long jump at the 1948 Summer Olympics.
