= Eleanor Lausch =

American opera singer

Eleanor Lausch Dietrich, (July 30, 1912 – May 4, 2001) was an American operatic soprano. Born to Austrian immigrant parents in Brooklyn, she grew up in Queens. She was trained as a pianist, organist, and a singer, and began her opera career at the Vienna Volksoper in 1939. World War II interrupted her opera career, and she resumed performing in operas in Austria in the late 1940s after the war. She appeared at the Bayreuth Festival in 1951, and afterwords was active as radio singer in Europe in the early 1950s. In 1953 she returned to Queens and was active as a concert soprano in the New York City region into the early 1970s. In 1963 she married Reverend Lester Dietrich. She lived in Oceanside, Long Island from 1971 until her death in 2001.

== Early life ==
The daughter of Mathilde Lausch, Eleanor Lausch was born in Brooklyn, New York on July 30, 1912. Her parents had immigrated to the United States from Austria. She grew up in Queens where she was educated in New York City Public Schools. She was initially trained as a concert pianist in New York City. In 1926 she won a silver medal as a pianist in an inter-borough music competition held for young musicians in New York City. In 1928 she graduated from the secretarial course at Heffley Queensboro School. By 1929 she was performing as an organist at youth events held at Ridgewood Heights Methodist Episcopal Church on Woodward Ave. in Queens.

== Career ==
Lausch trained as a classical singer in New York and Vienna. In 1937 she performed as a soprano soloist in concerts with the Brooklyn Music Guild. She made her European concert debut in Vienna in 1938, and her opera debut at the Vienna Volksoper (VV) in 1939. Her burgeoning career in Vienna was cut short due to the outbreak of World War II, and she fled to the United States in 1940. She performed in concerts in New York in 1941. She resumed performing at the VV after the war in the late 1940s.

In 1951 Lausch performed the role of Ortlinde in Richard Wagner's Die Walküre at the Bayreuth Festival. She recorded that same role for HMV. In June 1951 she sang a recital of music by Joseph Haydn and Franz Schubert that was broadcast on BBC Third Programme radio. After this she worked as a radio singer in Luxemburg. In the autumn of 1953 she returned the New York from Europe where she gave an organ recital in Glendale, Queens in October of that year. In 1955 she was a soloist with the Babylon Symphony Orchestra conducted by Christos Vrionides, in 1957 she sang a program of music by Richard Strauss, Wagner and Edvard Grieg with the Queens Symphony Orchestra. In December 1957 she was a recitalist at the Brooklyn Museum.

In 1958 Lausch was a soloist in a concert with the Arion Society of New York and the Seuffert Band performing excerpts from Puccini's Madama Butterfly. She appeared with these ensembles again the following year in a tribute concert to composer Sigmund Romberg. In February 1959 she sang in concert with the Massapequa Symphony Orchestra. In 1960 she performed a program of music by Christoph Willibald Gluck, Wagner, and Giuseppe Verdi with the Nutley Symphony Society. In 1965 she was a soloist with the Symphony Society of Oceanside. In 1970 she sang a concert of opera arias with the Queens Festival Orchestra.

== Later life ==
In 1963 Lausch married Reverend Lester Dietrich in Queens. The couple resided in Oceanside, Long Island where Eleanor lived since 1961. She served as president of the Woman's Club of Staten Island in the 1960s. She was also active as a choral conductor of amateur groups and as a teacher of voice and piano. After her husband's death in 1972 she established the Eleanor Dietrich Chorale in his memory. In her later life she gave recitals at the Oceanside Senior Center (1986) and the Freeport Public Library in Freeport, New York (1988).

Lausch Dietrich died on May 4, 2001 in Island Park, New York.
