= Roar Berthelsen =

Norwegian long jumper (1934–1990)

Roar Berthelsen (3 November 1934 – 1 August 1990) was a Norwegian long jumper. He represented Mandal og Halse IL and IK Tjalve.

At the 1954 European Championships he finished eleventh in the long jump final with a jump of 7.16 metres. He also competed at the 1960 Summer Olympics without qualifying for the final. He became Norwegian champion in long jump in 1954, 1956, 1957 and 1959.

His personal best jump was 7.62 metres, achieved in August 1959 at Bislett stadion. This places him thirteenth among Norwegian long jumpers.
