= Charles Binaux =

French cross-country skier (1928–2001)

Personal information
- Nationality: French
- Born: 2 December 1928; La Bresse, France
- Died: 19 May 2001 (aged 72); Nancy, France

Sport
- Sport: Cross-country skiing

Charles Binaux (2 December 1928 – 19 May 2001) was a French cross-country skier. He competed in the men's 30 kilometre event at the 1956 Winter Olympics.
