= Jaroslav Fikejz =

Personal information
- Nationality: Czech
- Born: 24 April 1927 Kaliště, Orlické Podhůří, Czechoslovakia
- Died: 26 December 2008 (aged 81) Prague, Czech Republic

Sport
- Sport: Athletics
- Event: Long jump
Medal record
Men's athletics
Representing Czechoslovakia
European Championships
Bronze medal – third place	1950 Brussels	Long jump

Jaroslav Fikejz (24 April 1927 – 26 December 2008) was a Czech athlete. He competed in the men's long jump at the 1948 Summer Olympics.
