= Egon Andersen =

Danish footballer (1910-2001)

Personal information
- Full name: Egon Baasch Andersen
- Date of birth: 30 December 1910
- Place of birth: Copenhagen, Denmark
- Date of death: 6 May 2001 (aged 90)
- Position: Defender

International career
Years	Team	Apps	(Gls)
1936	Denmark	4	(0)

Egon Andersen (30 December 1910 – 6 May 2001) was a Danish footballer. He played in four matches for the Denmark national football team in 1936.
