= Karl-Erik Israelsson =

Swedish long jumper

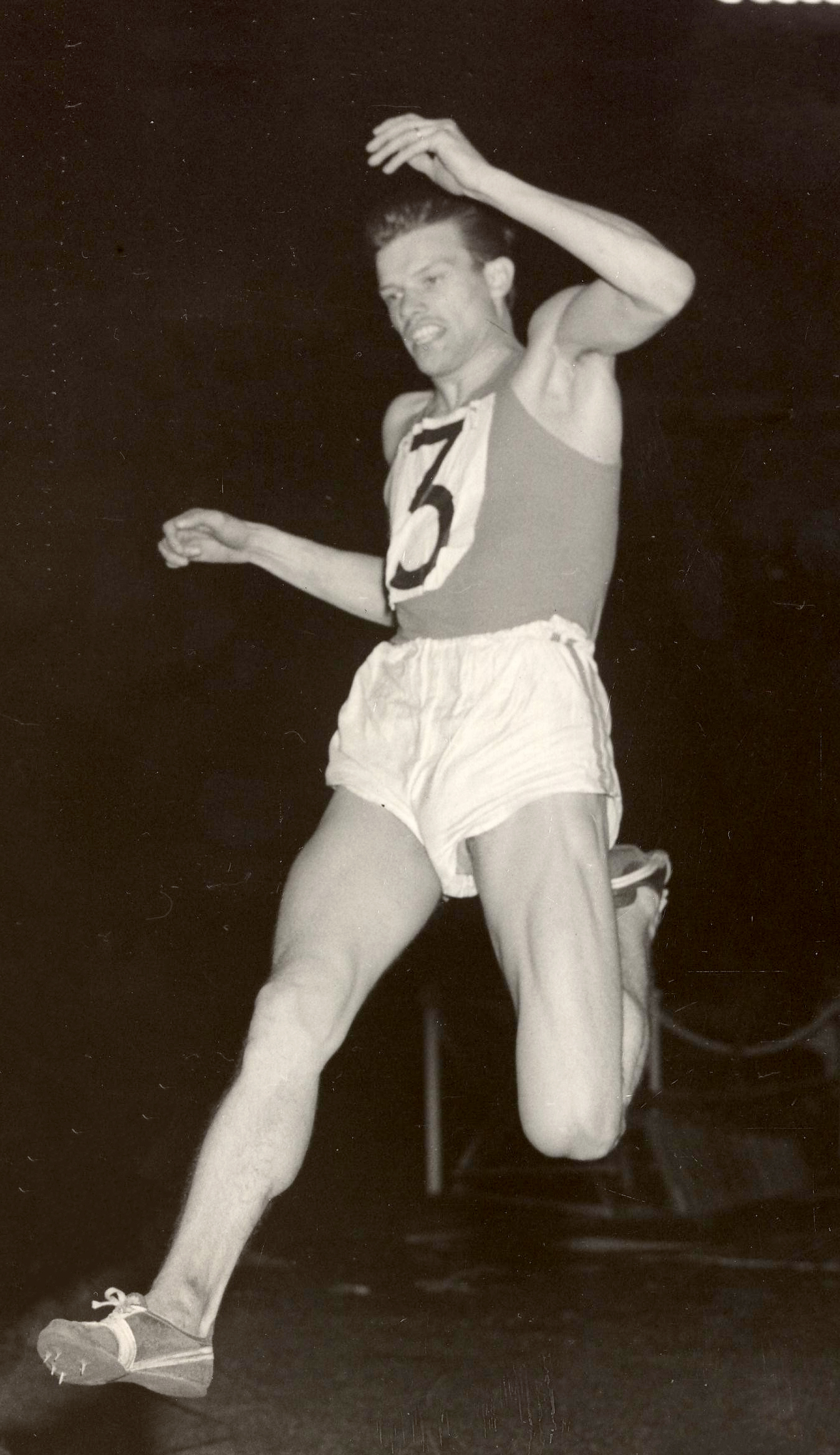
- Karl-Erik Israelsson in 1953

Personal information
- Born: 23 August 1929 Stockholm, Sweden
- Died: 10 January 2013 (aged 83) Uppsala, Sweden
- Height: 1.87 m (6 ft 2 in)
- Weight: 80 kg (180 lb)

Sport
- Sport: Athletics
- Event: Long jump
- Club: IF Ulvarna, Stockholm

Achievements and titles
- Personal best: 7.27 m (1952)

Karl-Erik "Cacka" Israelsson (23 August 1929 – 10 January 2013) was a Swedish long jumper, who won the national title in 1951 and finished seventh at the 1952 Summer Olympics. He was also a notable singer-songwriter in the country music style and an occasional actor.
