= Paul Faucher =

French long jumper (1920–2007)

Personal information
- Born: 6 February 1920 Breloux-la-Crèche, France
- Died: 15 April 2007 (aged 87) Ballainvilliers, France

Sport
- Country: France
- Sport: Athletics
- Event: Long jump
- Club: ESP Poitiers EC

Paul Faucher (6 February 1920 – 15 April 2007) was a French athlete. He competed in the men's long jump at the 1952 Summer Olympics.
