= Jorma Valtonen (athlete) =

Finnish long jumper

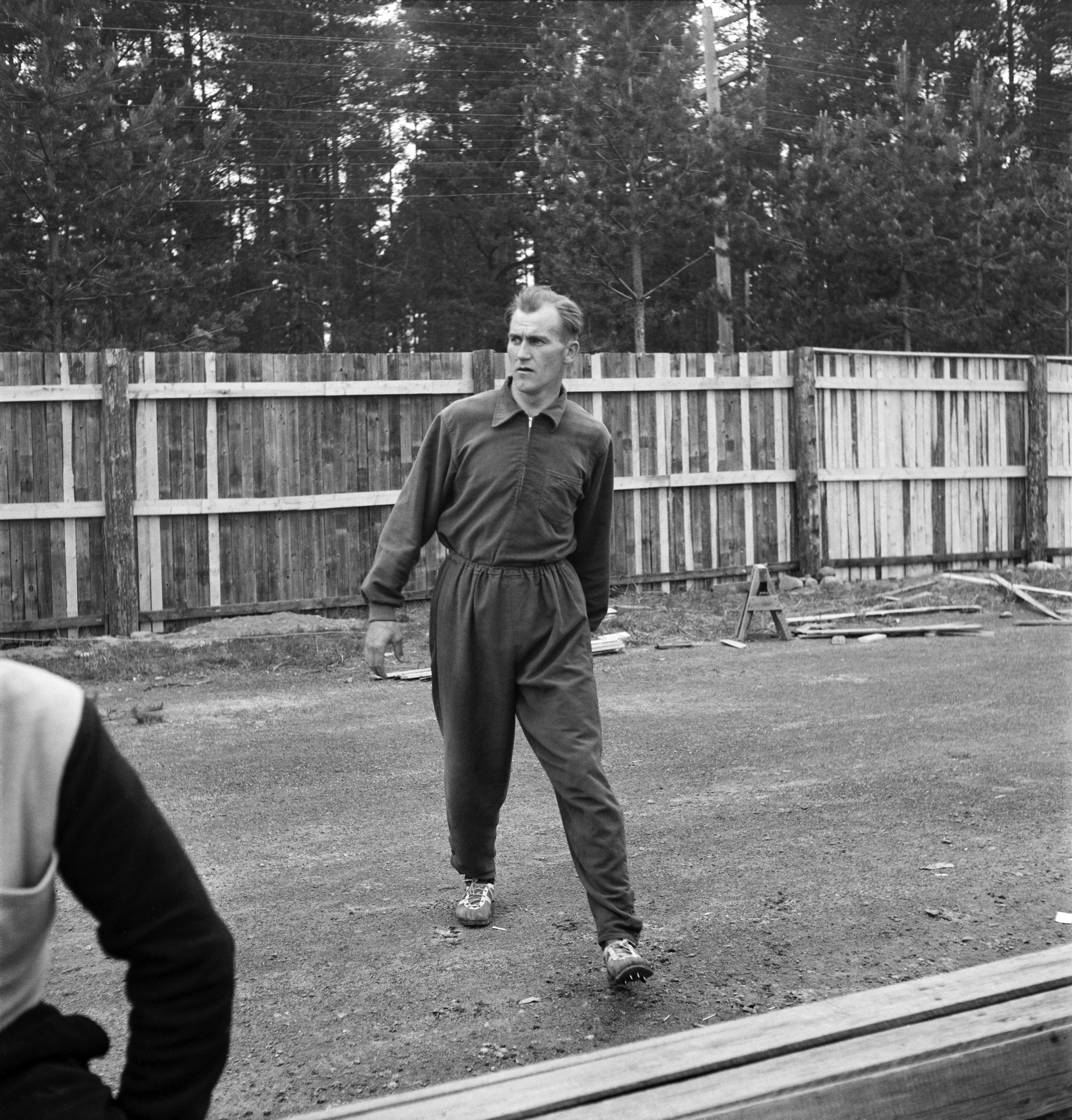
- training for the Helsinki Olympics at Ostrobothnia Sports Institute in Kuortane in 1952

Personal information
- Nationality: Finnish
- Born: 29 March 1923 Sakkola, Finland (now Gromovo, Russia)
- Died: 31 May 2001 (aged 78) Savonlinna, Finland

Sport
- Sport: Athletics
- Event: Long jump

Jorma Valtonen (29 March 1923 – 31 May 2001) was a Finnish athlete. He competed in the men's long jump at the 1952 Summer Olympics.
