= Ödön Földessy =

Hungarian athlete (1929–2020)

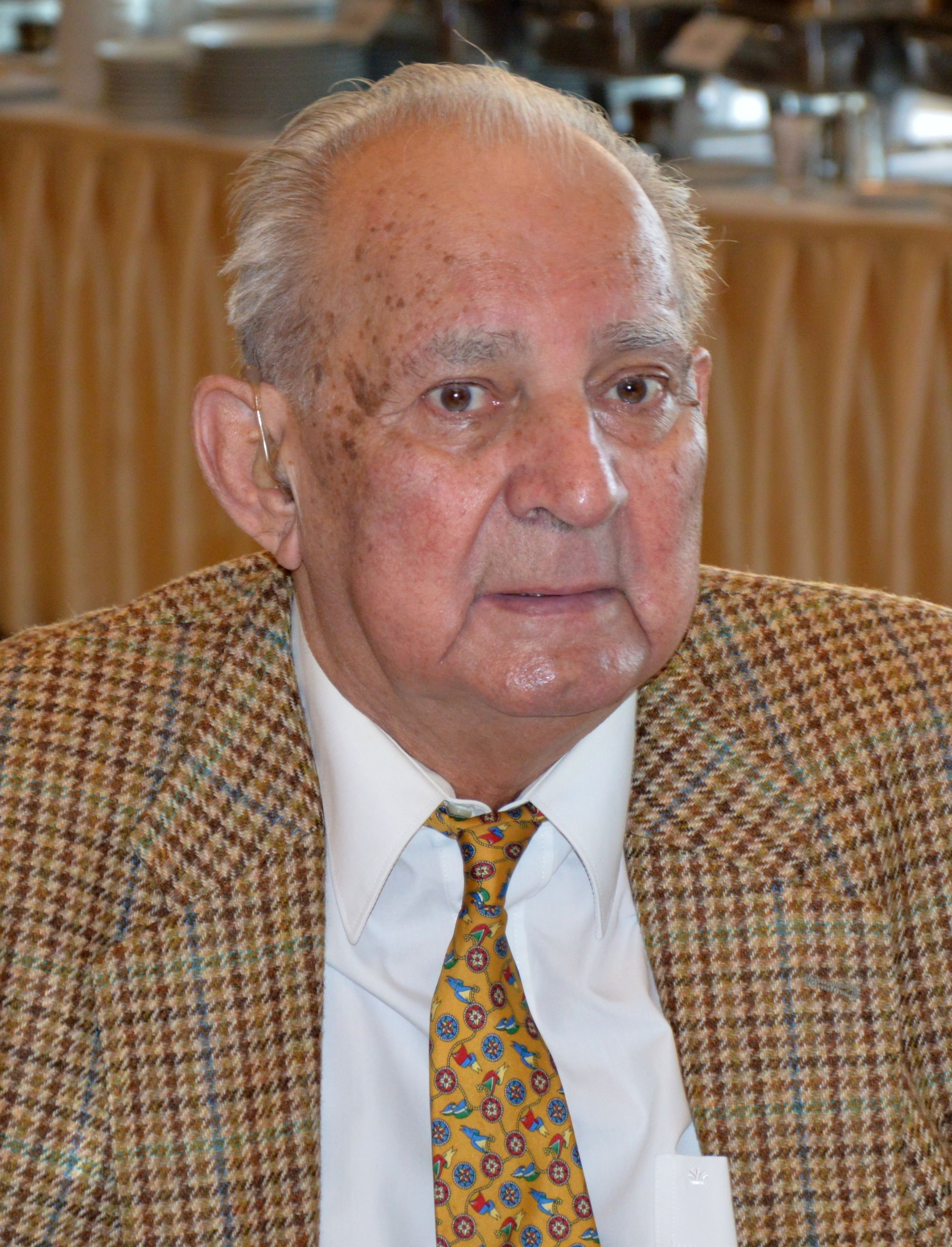
- Földessy in 2013

Personal information
- Nationality: Hungarian
- Born: 1 July 1929 in Békés, Hungary
- Died: 9 June 2020 (aged 90) Budapest, Hungary

Sport
- Sport: Athletics
- Event: long jump
- Club: Újpesti TE
Medal record
Men’s athletics
Representing Hungary
Olympic Games
Bronze medal – third place	1952 Helsinki	Long jump
European Championships
Gold medal – first place	1954 Bern	Long jump

Ödön Földessy (1 July 1929 – 9 June 2020) was a Hungarian athlete who mainly competed in the long jump. He was born in Békés. He competed for Hungary in the men's long jump event at the 1952 Summer Olympics held in Helsinki, Finland, where he won the bronze medal.

Földessy won the British AAA Championships title at the 1954 AAA Championships.

He died in Budapest on 9 June 2020.
