= Western Military Academy =

American College-preparatory school

Coordinates: 38°54′27.2″N 90°8′38.4″W

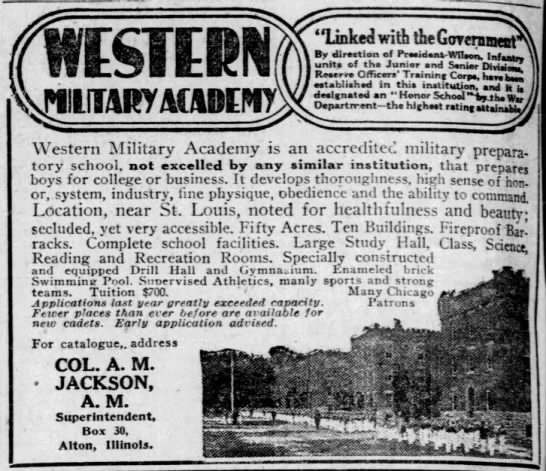
Western Military Academy ad August 1918

Western Military Academy was a private military preparatory school located in Alton, Illinois, United States. It operated from 1879 to 1971. The campus is part of the National Register of Historic Places District (ID.78001167). The school motto was Mens Sana in Corpore Sano ("A sound mind in a sound body").

== Early years ==
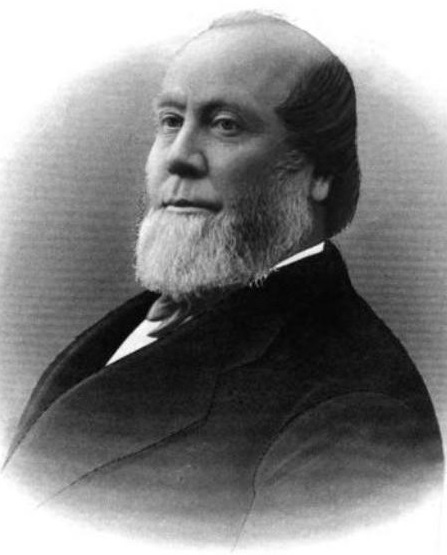
Edward Wyman, founder of Western Military Academy

In 1879, Edward Wyman, an 1835 Amherst College graduate, opened a boarding school for boys in what was then Upper Alton, Illinois. Wyman had been an esteemed educator in the St. Louis public schools. A school circular said that Wyman believed the region then called the western United States needed a "boarding school for the proper education of young men." In 1887, Wyman hired Albert M. Jackson to be a member of the staff. Jackson was an 1884 Princeton graduate and had just completed two years of teaching mathematics and Latin at Blair Academy in New Jersey. Upon Wyman's death in 1888, ownership of the school passed to Col. Willis Brown and Albert M. Jackson was made the principal. It was during this time that the school changed its name to Western Military Academy and introduced military training. After eight years at the helm, Col. Brown chose to retire. In 1896 Albert M. Jackson and the academy's financial officer, George D. Eaton purchased Western Military Academy. The Jackson family would retain ownership of the school until it closed in 1971.

== 1900–1940 ==
In 1900, the academy had an enrollment of 100 cadets. In February 1903, a fire destroyed the school administration building and the primary barracks, closing the academy for the rest of the term. It reopened in September 1903 with a new administration building and two barracks, and an enrollment of 132 students. A third barracks was completed during the academic year.

Early in the century, Western was designated an Honor Military School by the United States War Department. By 1920, WMA had been listed in "Distinguished Colleges and Military Schools". That standing granted a school the right to one appointment, without examination, to both the Regular Army and to West Point. By 1924, the last two barracks were completed, giving the campus the look it would have until it closed. The first edition of the Western yearbook, The Recall, was published that year. Enrollment grew as facilities were added; Western enjoyed a full complement of over 300 cadets from 1912 through the 1920s. The reputation of the academy spread as its graduates became successful. William S. Paley, a 1918 graduate, went on to become the chairman of the board for Columbia Broadcasting System. Paley would recall his time at Western Military Academy as a "turning point of my life."

The Great Depression reduced enrollment at Western, putting the academy at half capacity through much of the 1930s. Still, the decade had several distinguished graduates, including two of World War II's most decorated pilots. Edward O'Hare, a 1932 WMA alumni and namesake of O'Hare International Airport in Chicago, was awarded the Medal of Honor for his heroism in naval air combat before dying in action in 1943. A 1933 grad, Paul Tibbets, piloted the bomber Enola Gay on August 6, 1945, to drop the first atomic bomb on Hiroshima, Japan.

Enrollment rose again as the Great Depression ebbed and concern over the war in Europe rose.

== The world wars ==
Western Military Academy kept detailed service records of its graduates during the First and Second World Wars. The most definitive of the World War I records, as highlighted in History of Western Military Academy, Alton, Il 1879–1971 by Robert Scott, shows that of the 402 WMA graduates after 1909, 295 or 73%, served in the military during the conflict. Four graduates died in the service and others were listed as "wounded" or "lightly gassed."

More than 1,000 graduates—that is, more than half of all alumni at the time—served in World War II. More than 40 were killed in action. Brigadier General A. Owen Seaman, class of 1897, was a member of the earliest known class to serve in World War II. A partial list of the decorations awarded to WMA graduates in the World War II include one Medal of Honor, four Distinguished Service Crosses, two Navy Crosses, four Legion of Merit medals, 23 Silver Stars, and 15 Distinguished Flying Crosses. The school's records on the service of her graduates in the Korean and Vietnam wars are incomplete.

The stone front gate on the Western campus is named the Memorial Gate to honor alumni who died in the service of their country.

== 1940–1970 ==
By the 1940s, the war in Europe and the improving economic situation in the United States would find Western again at capacity enrollment. Colonel R.L. Jackson (class of 1906) had succeeded his father as superintendent in 1919. He had guided the school through the difficulties of the 1930s and would continue to hold the post into the 1950s. Western would have a waiting list of applicants from the 1940s through the 1960s. The academy could and did attract the best students. Part of the appeal of Western Military Academy was the quality of the academic and military staff. The Military Department was regularly led by graduates of the United States Military Academy. Several members of that department would have a record of distinguished service in the World War II, Korea and Vietnam. Academically, Western boasted a staff with graduates from the most exclusive colleges and universities. Colonel R.L. Jackson, like his father, was a Princeton graduate and had continued his education at Harvard. The 1940 school annual, The Recall, listed instructors who had attended Harvard, Colgate, Yale, Dartmouth, Northwestern, University of Grenoble-France, Columbia, Washington University and Albion College Conservatory. During the thirty-year span from 1940 to the beginning of 1970 Western's enrollment remained between 300 and 325. The academic and military areas of cadet life were supplemented by extensive extra-curricular opportunities.

== Cultural entertainment ==
In a WMA circular printed early in the 1900s, the administration defined their thinking on the topic of entertainment. "Having found by long experience that amusements, indulged in to a reasonable extent, are helpful rather than otherwise, to both the deportment and progress of the cadets, the authorities of the Academy arrange each year a series of receptions, musical and literary entertainments and excursions, so distributed as to relieve somewhat the monotony of school life, and so conducted as to accustom the cadets to the usages of good society." It was a policy the school maintained until it closed.

The prestige of the academy helped attract several notable guests to be part of this program. National Baseball Hall of Fame baseball players Rogers Hornsby, Hank Greenberg and Dizzy Dean talked baseball with the students. Boxer Jack Dempsey gave a speech to the Corps. Bandleader Tommy Dorsey and crooner Frank Sinatra performed at Western as did comic Joe E. Brown. Amelia Earhart and Medal of Honor recipient General Jonathan Mayhew Wainwright IV were among the other guests who spoke at WMA. Several Western alumni would also return to the campus and share their experiences with the cadets.

== Athletics ==
During Western Military Academy's 92 years, athletics were an important part of the cadets environment. A wide variety of sports gave every student the opportunity to participate. Several levels of teams were offered in most sports which included football, cross-country, basketball, wrestling, soccer, swimming, a rifle team, baseball, track, golf and tennis. Western had a golf course designed by prolific golf designer Tom Bendelow on campus in the early 1900s. Other sports offered at times during the school's existence included interscholastic bowling, fencing and an equestrian team.

In the 1930s a WMA catalog labeled football "The King of Sports" at the academy. The school fielded four different teams offering boys of all sizes the chance to play. For most of the school's history well over half the Corps played on a football team. The St. Louis Globe Democrat reported that in 1895 WMA played Smith Academy in the first high school football game ever played in the St. Louis. In 1904 Western began a football competition with Alton High School. The annual Thanksgiving Day game, pitting the cadets against the public school team, became "the biggest event on the Alton sports calendar", according to the Alton Evening Telegraph. Thousands would set aside their Thanksgiving afternoon to attend the game. The rivalry was discontinued in 1952.

== School closing ==
By the late 1960s, rising costs and inflation meant the academy would face economic hardships as it moved into the 1970s. The anti-military sentiment caused by the Vietnam War was a major factor in Western's declining enrollment, and had a drastic impact in just a few years. In 1967–68 the school's barracks were filled to capacity, with an enrollment of 325 cadets; three years later, in the 1970-1971 school year, enrollment had dropped by more than half to 154, as shown in the 1971 yearbook, The Recall. In June 1971 the Western Military Academy held its 92nd and final commencement ceremony, and afterwards the school was closed.

The former campus now houses the Mississippi Valley Christian School.

== Notable alumni ==
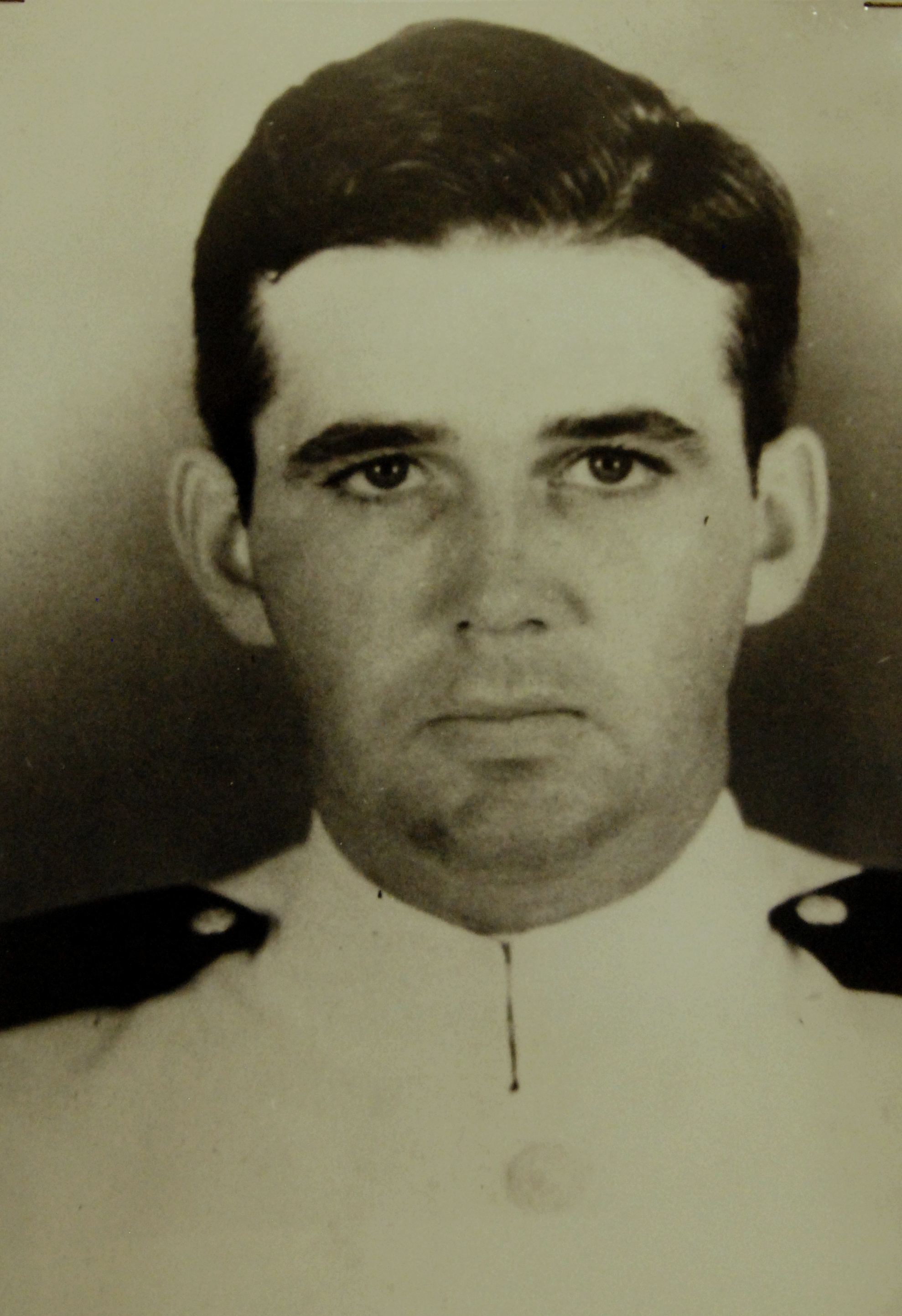
Edward "Butch" O'Hare, World War II recipient of the Medal of Honor and alumni of Western Military Academy

- Thomas Hart Benton, 1906. Artist. Did not graduate.
- Harry J. Collins, 1915. U.S. Army major general.
- Rex Everhart, 1938. Actor.
- Carl R. Gray, 1907. U.S. Army major general, head of the Veterans Administration.
- Rolland V. Heiser, 1943. U.S. Army lieutenant general. Founder of the Korean Military Academy. President of the New College of Florida Foundation.
- William P. T. Hill, 1914. U.S. Marine Corps major general. Quartermaster General U.S. Marine Corps.
- Richard Muckerman, 1912. Owner of the St. Louis Browns baseball team.
- Edward O'Hare, 1932. Medal of Honor recipient. O'Hare International Airport named in his honor.
- William S. Paley, 1918. Chairman of the board of Columbia Broadcasting System.
- Jack Quinlan, 1944. Sports broadcaster. Voice of the Chicago Cubs on WGN radio, 1957–1964.
- Pedro Rodríguez, 1955. Mexican racing driver. Two-time World Champion of Makes (1970 and 1971).
- Eugenio Garza Sada, 1906. Mexican businessman and philanthropist. Founder of Monterrey Institute of Technology and Higher Education.
- Tam Spiva, c. 1950. Television screenwriter.
- John Stelle, 1908. governor of Illinois.
- F. Morgan "Buzz" Taylor, 1949. President of the United States Golf Association.
- Paul Tibbets, 1933. Commander of first atomic bomb mission as pilot of the Enola Gay.
- Lee Tracy, 1918. Actor.
- Sander Vanocur, 1946. Journalist.
- Michael Wallis, 1963. Author, journalist and popular historian.
