= Harry Askew =

British long jumper (1917–1986)

Personal information
- Full name: Henry Edward Askew
- Nationality: British (English)
- Born: 31 December 1917 Barrow in Furness, Cumbria
- Died: 31 October 1986 (aged 68) Chichester, West Sussex, England

Sport
- Sport: Athletics
- Event: Long jump
- Club: University of Cambridge AC; Jersey AC; Achilles Club

Henry Edward Askew (31 December 1917 – 31 October 1986) was a British athlete who competed at the 1948 Summer Olympics.

== Biography ==
Askew started long jumping at Barrow Grammar School before going to Gonville and Caius College, Cambridge where he won the 1937 Oxbridge Sports. He would become a member of the Achilles Club.

Askew finished second behind William Breach in the long jump event at the 1939 AAA Championships before his career was interrupted by World War II.

After the war Askew finished third behind Denis Watts in the long jump event at the 1946 AAA Championships.

At the 1948 Olympic Games in London, he represented the Great Britain team and competed in the men's long jump competition.

In 1950, Askew finally became the national long jump champion after winning the British AAA title at the 1950 AAA Championships.
