= Ludwig Kuhn =

German ice hockey player (1918–2001)

Personal information
- Nationality: German
- Born: 26 May 1918 Füssen, Germany
- Died: 6 May 2001 (aged 82) Füssen, Germany

Sport
- Sport: Ice hockey

Ludwig Kuhn (26 May 1918 – 6 May 2001) was a German ice hockey player. He competed in the men's tournament at the 1952 Winter Olympics.
