= Leonid Grigoryev =

Soviet long jumper

Personal information
- Nationality: Soviet
- Born: 17 August 1926 St. Petersburg, U.S.S.R.

Sport
- Sport: Athletics
- Event: Long jump

Leonid Grigoryev (born 17 August 1926) was a Soviet athlete. He competed in the men's long jump at the 1952 Summer Olympics.
