= Rolf Jahn =

German footballer (1927–2001)

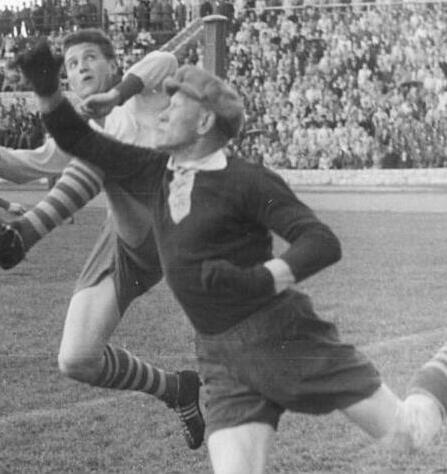
- Jahn in 1957

Personal information
- Date of birth: 8 October 1927
- Place of birth: Apolda, Germany
- Date of death: 3 May 2001 (aged 73)
- Position: Goalkeeper

Senior career*
Years	Team	Apps	(Gls)
1950–1954	Motor Jena (Note: "Mechanik Jena" until 1951)		
1954–1959	Turbine Erfurt	128	(0)

International career
1957	East Germany	1	(0)
- * Club domestic league appearances and goals

Rolf Jahn (8 October 1927 – 3 May 2001) was a German footballer who played as a goalkeeper for Motor Jena and Turbine Erfurt. He made one appearance for the East Germany national team in 1957.
