= Henk Visser (long jumper) =

Dutch long jumper

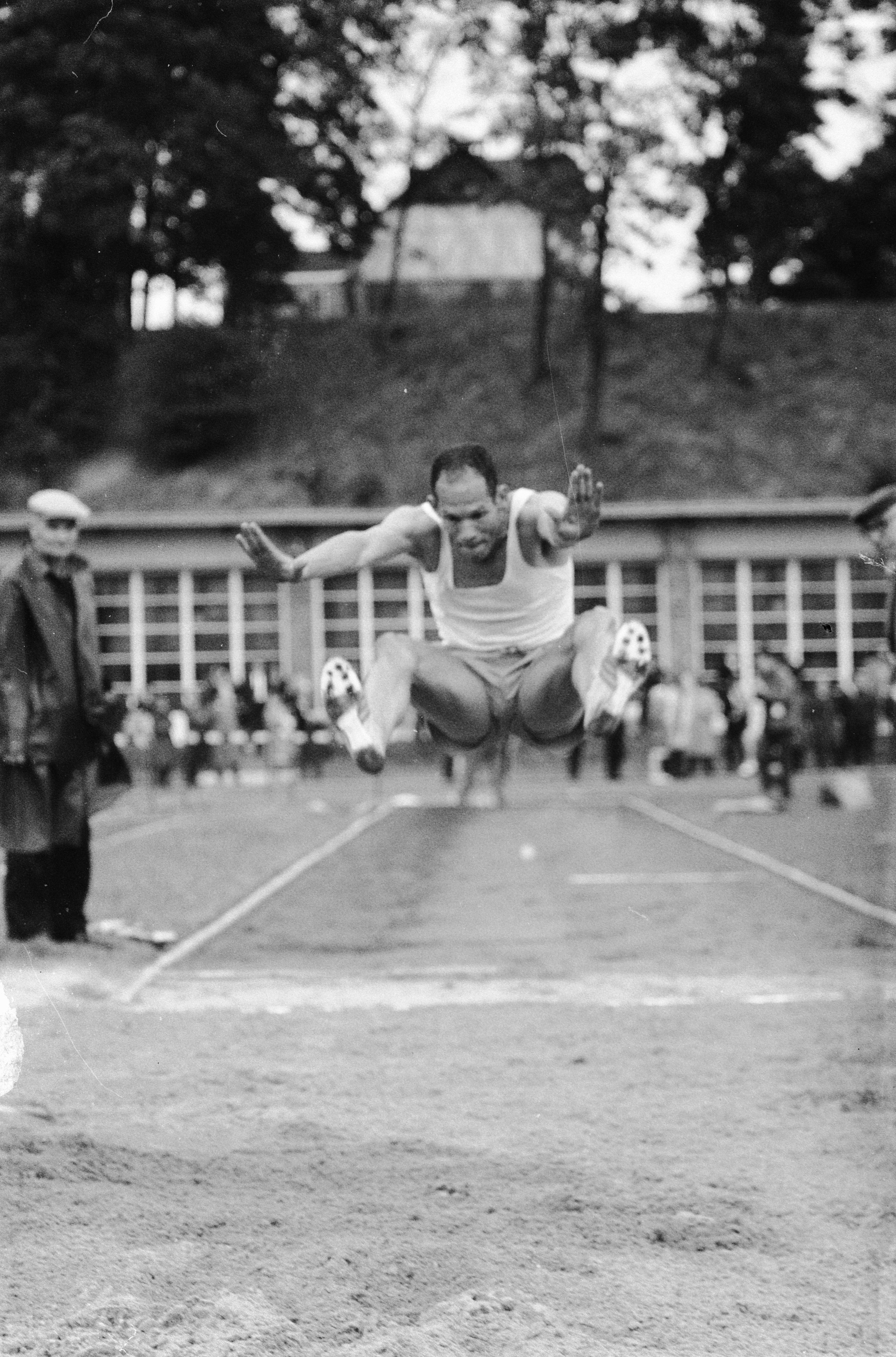
- Henk Visser in 1960

Personal information
- Born: 23 March 1932 Willemstad, Curaçao
- Died: 13 November 2015 (aged 83) Arnhem, Gelderland, Netherlands
- Height: 1.89 m (6 ft 2 in)
- Weight: 85 kg (187 lb)

Sport
- Sport: Long jump
- Club: AAC, Amsterdam

Henk Visser (23 March 1932 – 13 November 2015) was a long jumper from the Netherlands. He competed at the 1952 and 1960 Summer Olympics and finished seventh in 1960.

== Records ==
On 17 September 1956, during the international competitions in Bucharest, he jumped 7.98 m, setting a national and European record. This was the longest jump in 1956 and one of the best jumps ever in Europe by that time. However, Visser could not take part in the 1956 Olympic Games due to their boycott by the Netherlands.

Besides the long jump, he also competed in the high jump and sprint, with the best achievements of 10.5 s in 100 m, 20.3 s in 200 m and 1.82 m in high jump.

== Olympics ==
In early 1959 Visser, who then worked as a clerk in a shipping company, left for the United States, where he obtained a study scholarship. He started at San José College, but then moved to Bakersfield College. Visser competed for the UC Santa Barbara Gauchos track and field team in the NCAA, becoming their first Olympian. At athletic competitions in Texas, he jumped 8.05 m, but overstepped the plank, and the jump was discounted. Nevetherless, he had registered 7.97 m in April 1960 in Santa Barbara, California, and was considered a candidate for a medal at the 1960 Olympics. However, he finished in seventh place with a humble result of 7.66 m.

He retired soon after the Games and later ran a sportswear and footwear export business from his home in Santa Barbara. In the 1990s he returned to the Netherlands.

== Condor Club International ==
In the early 1970s, Visser promoted a Santa Monica travel organization called Condor Club International, which sold itself inappropriately as an air travel club, a membership form of US air transport. In 1976 he was fined $65,000 by the state of California and forced to issue refunds of up to $100,000 to consumers for Condor activities. Visser also served jail time for misdemeanor charges related to Condor. Condor briefly acquired a Douglas DC-8 in 1974 (photo in External links). Visser viewed himself as victim of a conspiracy and pursued matters through state and federal courts. In 1990 a Federal appeals court deemed him an abusive litigant and said "His filings are replete with unsupported allegations of bribery, entrapment and corruption."
