= Meredith Gourdine =

American long jumper (1929–1998)

- Born: September 26, 1929; Newark, New Jersey
- Died: November 20, 1998 (aged 69); Houston, Texas
- Education: Brooklyn Technical High School; B.S. Cornell University; Ph.D. Caltech
- Known for: electrogasdynamics

Olympic medal record

Men's Athletics

Representing United States
Silver medal – second place	1952 Helsinki	Long jump

Meredith Charles "Flash" Gourdine (September 26, 1929 – November 20, 1998) was an American athlete, engineer and physicist. His nickname, "Flash" Gourdine, is a reference to comic strip character Flash Gordon.

== Early life ==
Gourdine graduated from Brooklyn Technical High School. He earned a BS in Engineering Physics from Cornell University in 1953, where he was selected for membership in the Quill and Dagger society. In 1960, he earned a Ph.D. in Engineering Physics from the California Institute of Technology on a Guggenheim fellowship.

== Career ==
=== Athletic career ===
At the 1952 Summer Olympics in Helsinki, while he was still an undergraduate student at Cornell, he won a silver medal for the long jump, one and a half inch short of Jerome Biffle's gold medal jump.

=== Scientific career ===
Meredith Gourdine is featured in this USPTO film from 1989. Skip to 14:10 for the start of the section on Gourdine, which includes him speaking about his work on airport fog dispersal system, his time as an Olympian, and his work in the late 1980's.

During the last three years of his Ph.D. program (1958-1960), Gourdine worked as a senior research scientist at the Jet Propulsion Laboratory. After graduation, he worked for Plasmadyne Corporation and Curtis-Wright Corporation, then in 1964, he founded a research and development firm, Gourdine Laboratories, in Livingston, New Jersey. In 1973 he founded Energy Innovations, a company that produced direct-energy conversion devices in Houston, Texas. The companies developed engineering techniques to aid removing smoke from buildings and disperse fog from airport runways, and converting low-grade coal into inexpensive, transportable and high-voltage electrical energy.

Gourdine was inducted to the Dayton, Ohio, Engineering and Science Hall of Fame in 1994, was elected to the National Academy of Engineering in 1991, was a member of the Black Inventors' Hall of Fame, a member of the Army Science Board, and served as a Trustee of Cornell University. He was an expert in electrogasdynamics, the generation of electrical energy based on the conversion of the kinetic energy contained in a high-pressure, ionized, moving combustion gas (e.g., Ion wind). He specialized in devising applications, including electric precipitator systems. He also invented the Focus Flow Heat Sink, used to cool computer chips.

Gourdine was granted a total of over 30 U.S. patents.

He was involved in a number of civic groups during his career, including New York Mayor Lindsay's Task Force on Air Pollution, President Lyndon Johnson's Advisory Panel on Energy, and President Richard Nixon's Task Force on Small Business.
