= Jerome Biffle =

American athlete

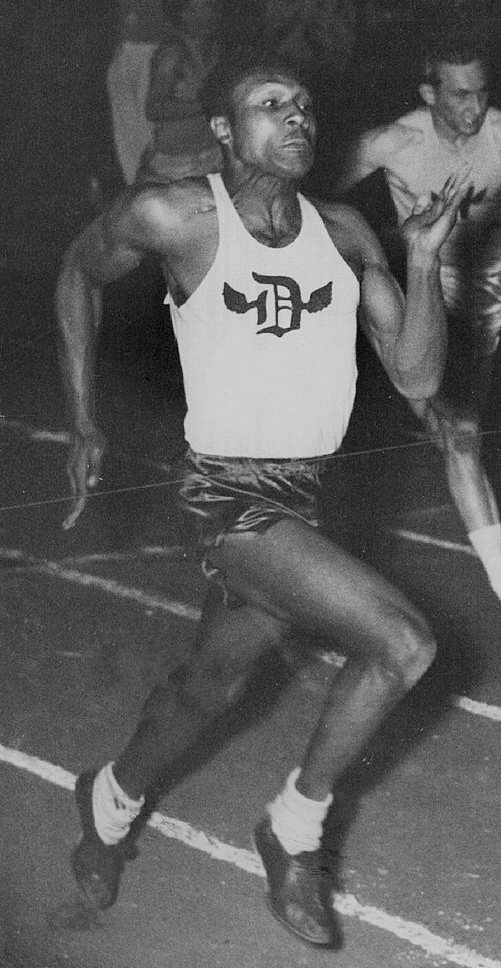
- Biffle in 1950

Personal information
- Born: March 20, 1928 Denver, Colorado, U.S.
- Died: September 4, 2002 (aged 74) Denver, Colorado, U.S.
- Height: 184 cm (6 ft 0 in)
- Weight: 79 kg (174 lb)

Sport
- Sport: Athletics
- Events: Long jump, high jump, sprint
- Club: U.S. Army

Achievements and titles
- Personal bests: LJ – 7.81 m (1950); HJ – 1.981 m (1948); 100 yd – 9.6 (1948); 100 m – 10.4 (1952)
Medal record
Representing the United States
Gold medal – first place	1952 Helsinki	Long jump

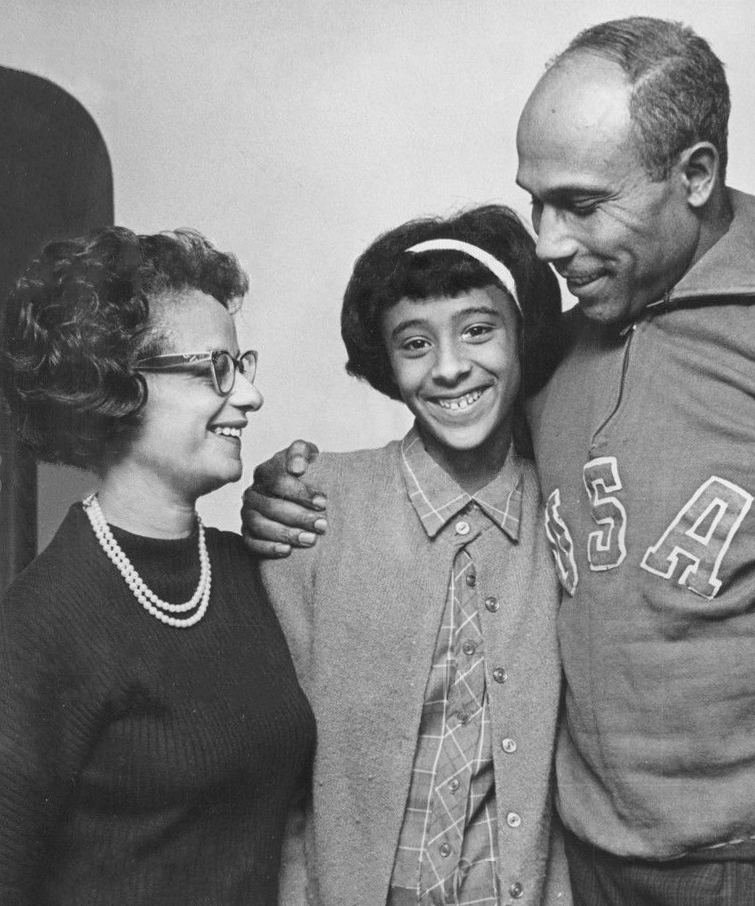
Biffle with wife and daughter in 1967

Jerome Cousins Biffle (March 20, 1928 – September 4, 2002) was an American athlete who competed mainly in the long jump, where he was the Gold Medalist at the 1952 Helsinki Olympic Games.

Biffle was born in Denver, Colorado, and attended Denver East High School, where he won all-state honors in the 100 and 220-yard sprints, high jump and broad jump before landing at the University of Denver. Biffle was known as "the one-man track team" while attending university. He led the Pioneers to the Skyline Conference title in 1949. In 1950, Biffle captured first-place finishes at the Kansas, Drake, and West Coast Relays, which were known as the "big three" of college track events during that period, as well as winning the NCAA long jump title. In that same year, Biffle was named Track and Field News top collegiate track star. After graduating from university, he joined the U.S. Army in 1951. Next year he earned a spot on the 1952 U.S. Olympic team and won a gold medal on his final attempt in the Olympic final, jumping 7.57 meters (24 feet, 10 inches).

He retired from competition in 1953.

Biffle later became a track coach and youth counselor at Denver East. In conjunction with Murray S. Hoffman, MD (President of the Colorado Heart Association) and Marilyn Van Derbur (1958 Miss America) he worked with the Colorado Heart Association to establish one of the earliest jogging programs to promote heart health. He died in Denver in 2002 from pulmonary fibrosis.
