= Willie Steele =

American long jumper

Medal record

Men's athletics

Representing the United States

Olympic Games
Gold medal – first place	1948 London	Long jump

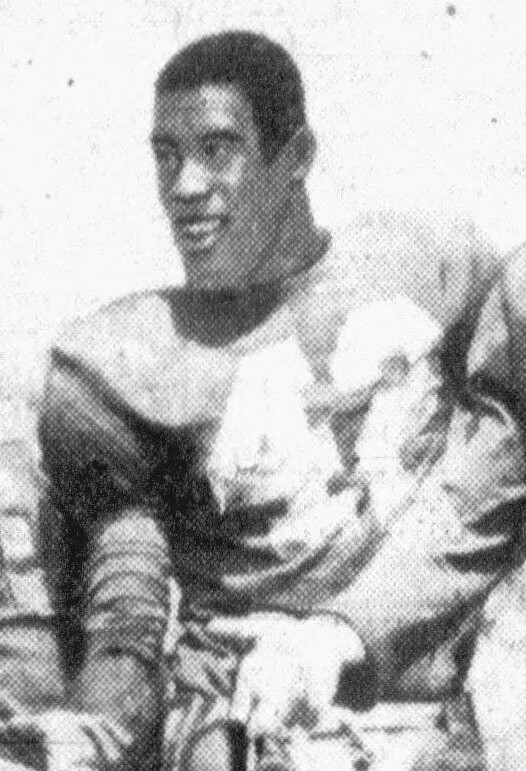
Steele as a member of the Los Angeles Rams during the 1949 NFL pre-season.

Video on YouTube Official Video Willie Steele's winning jump @ 00:50

William Samuel Steele (July 14, 1923 – September 19, 1989) was an American athlete who competed mainly in the long jump. Steele won the gold medal in the long jump at the 1948 London Olympics. A two-time USA Outdoor champion, Steele was the 1948 Olympic Trials champion and a two-time NCAA long jump champion. He was considered the world's best long jumper in 1942 and 1946, and was world ranked #1 by Track & Field News their first two years of producing worldwide rankings, 1947 and 1948.

== Career ==
Steele was born in El Centro, California on July 14, 1923. At age 4 his family moved to San Diego where he graduated from Herbert Hoover High School in 1940.

Steele initially competed for San Jose State College, coached by Bud Winter in the early 1940s, In 1942 the 18-year-old Willie Steele won the AAU Junior long jump and had a best mark of 25–7 (7.80) which topped the world rankings that year.

His college and track career was interrupted by World War II when he enlisted in the Army. He served in Africa and Italy, and he was decorated for his service.

After the war, Steele returned to college at San Diego State College (now San Diego State University) where he played basketball, football, and as a track star won two NCAA and one AAU broad jump championships. He had personal bests in the 100 yard dash of 9.7 (1948) and 26’6’ in the long jump (1947), a mere 2.25 inches behind Jesse Owens’ world record of 1935 that stood for some 25 years. His long jump remains the school record at San Diego State, not even surpassed by 1976 Olympic Gold medalist Arnie Robinson.

In his crowning achievement, he won the gold medal in the long jump in the 1948 London Summer Olympics. Prior to the event, Steele had suffered an ankle injury. He was able to take only two jumps, but won the gold medal, despite the injury, with his first leap of 25 feet 8 inches.

After his track career, Steele signed a contract to play halfback for the Los Angeles Rams but only performed in some exhibition games before being cut from the team.

Soft-spoken and unpretentious, Steele was the epitome of the student-athlete and he was a popular speaker at social and civic functions. Steele spent most of his working career in Oakland, California as a director in the city's Parks and Recreation Department. He raised a family in Oakland. A year after he retired, Steele died of cancer on September 19, 1989 at age 66.

In 2009, Willie Steele was inducted into the National Track and Field Hall of Fame.[2] He was also inducted into the Hall of Champions in San Diego's Balboa Park.

Championships 1948 Olympic Games: Long Jump – 7.82 m (1st)
1948 Olympic Trials: Long Jump – 7.98 m (1st)
1946 AAU Outdoors: Long Jump – 7.32 m (1st)
1947 AAU Outdoors: Long Jump – 7.55 m (1st)
1948 NCAA Outdoors: Long Jump – 7.60 m (1st)
1947 NCAA Outdoors: Long Jump – 8.08 m (1st) .
