= Emir Bayındır Mosque =

Mosque in Ahlat, Bitlis, Turkey

- Emir Bayındır Mescidi
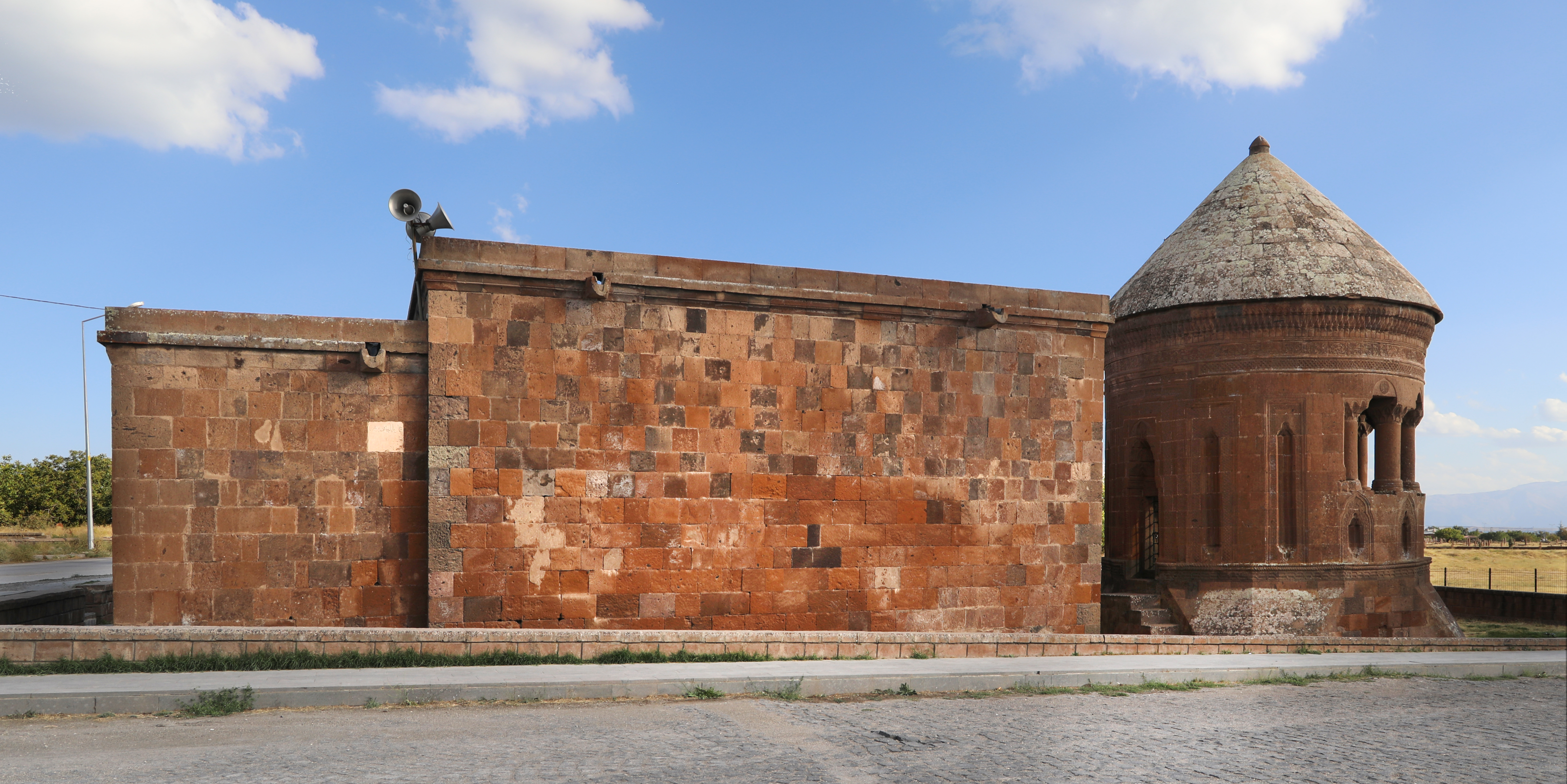
- The mosque (left) and the Emir Bayındır Tomb (September 2022)

Religion
- Affiliation: Islam
- Patron: Emir Bayındır ibn Rüstem

Location
- Location: Ahlat, Bitlis Province, Turkey
- Interactive map of Emir Bayındır Mosque
- Coordinates: 38°44′50″N 42°27′32″E

Architecture
- Architect: Baba Can Bey
- Type: Mosque
- Style: Akkoyunlu architecture
- Completed: 1477 or 1478
- Materials: Stone

Emir Bayındır Mosque (Turkish: Emir Bayındır Mescidi) is a 15th‑century mosque in Ahlat, Bitlis Province, Turkey. It was commissioned by the Akkoyunlu lord Emir Bayındır ibn Rüstem and completed in 1477 or 1478. The building’s architect was Baba Can Bey.
