= Buddhism in Turkey =

Türkiye'de Budizm
- Flag of Turkey

Total population
- Approximately 40,000 (2010 estimate); <0.1% of the population of Turkey

Regions with significant populations
- Istanbul (largest concentration); Ankara; İzmir; Antalya; Bodrum

Languages
- Turkish, English

Related ethnic groups
- Buddhism, Religion in Turkey

Buddhism is practiced by a small community, the majority of whom are foreign nationals, and it does not have official recognition by the Turkish state. According to 2010 estimates by the Pew Research Center, approximately 40,000 Buddhists live in Turkey, representing less than 0.1% of the country’s population.

== History ==
Buddhism has historical roots among Turkic peoples in Central Asia prior to the formation of the modern Turkish state. Academic studies indicate that several early Turkic groups encountered and, in some cases, adopted Buddhist beliefs between the 5th and 9th centuries through contact with Buddhist communities along the Silk Road. During this period, Buddhism coexisted with belief systems such as Tengrism, Manichaeism, and Zoroastrianism.

Historical sources suggest that rulers of the First Turkic Khaganate (6th century) maintained diplomatic relations with Buddhist centers in China and Central Asia. Buddhist monks were received at Turkic courts, and Buddhist texts circulated among elite circles, although Buddhism did not become the dominant religion of the khaganate.

Within the territory of modern-day Turkey, direct archaeological evidence of Buddhism is limited. The most frequently cited site associated with Buddhism is the Ahlat Buddhist Temple, located in the Ahlat district of Bitlis Province. The structure is believed to date from the 13th to 15th centuries and is often linked to the presence of Buddhist soldiers during the westward expansion of the Mongols into Anatolia. However, the identification of the site as a Buddhist temple remains disputed among scholars.

The structure, located in a cave complex in the Harabeşehir area, contains decorative elements such as peacock figures and a central lotus motif, symbols commonly associated with Buddhist iconography. Scholars note that such motifs alone are insufficient to conclusively identify the structure as a Buddhist religious site.

By the late medieval period, the Islamization of Turkic peoples and the political consolidation of Anatolia under the Seljuks and later the Ottoman Empire led to the disappearance of Buddhism as an organized religious presence in the region. Buddhism did not establish lasting institutional structures in Anatolia and remained absent from the religious framework of the Ottoman Empire.

== Demographics ==
The Buddhist population in Turkey consists primarily of expatriates from East Asia and Southeast Asia, including diplomats, business professionals, and students. A smaller number of Turkish citizens identify as Buddhists, often through conversion influenced by meditation practices, philosophical interest, or translated Buddhist literature. Due to the lack of official recognition, comprehensive demographic data beyond international estimates remain limited.

== Legal status ==
Buddhism does not have official legal recognition in Turkey. Buddhist communities therefore do not benefit from state funding or formal institutional status granted to some other religious groups. Nevertheless, freedom of religion is guaranteed under the Constitution of Turkey, and Buddhist practice is generally tolerated in private and informal settings.

== Modern presence ==
In contemporary Turkey, Buddhist practice typically occurs in informal contexts such as meditation groups, cultural associations, and yoga studios, particularly in large cities including Istanbul, Ankara, and İzmir. Some international Buddhist organizations periodically organize retreats and teachings in Turkey.

In 2015, amid public debate over the construction of mosques and prayer rooms on universities campuses, some university students symbolically demanded the construction of Buddhist and Jedi temples as a form of protest and expression of secularism.

== Public perception ==
Research indicates that Turkish media generally portrays Buddhism in a neutral or positive manner, except in reporting related to political crises in Myanmar. Public awareness of Buddhism is shaped by documentaries, travel programs, Asian television series, yoga studios, and translated literature. At least 40 Buddhism-related books have been translated into Turkish, including works by the Dalai Lama, Thích Nhất Hạnh, and Erich Fromm.

== See also ==
- Religion in Turkey
- Buddhism by country
- Freedom of religion in Turkey
