= Esenlik Mosque =

Mosque and former monastery in Muş, Turkey

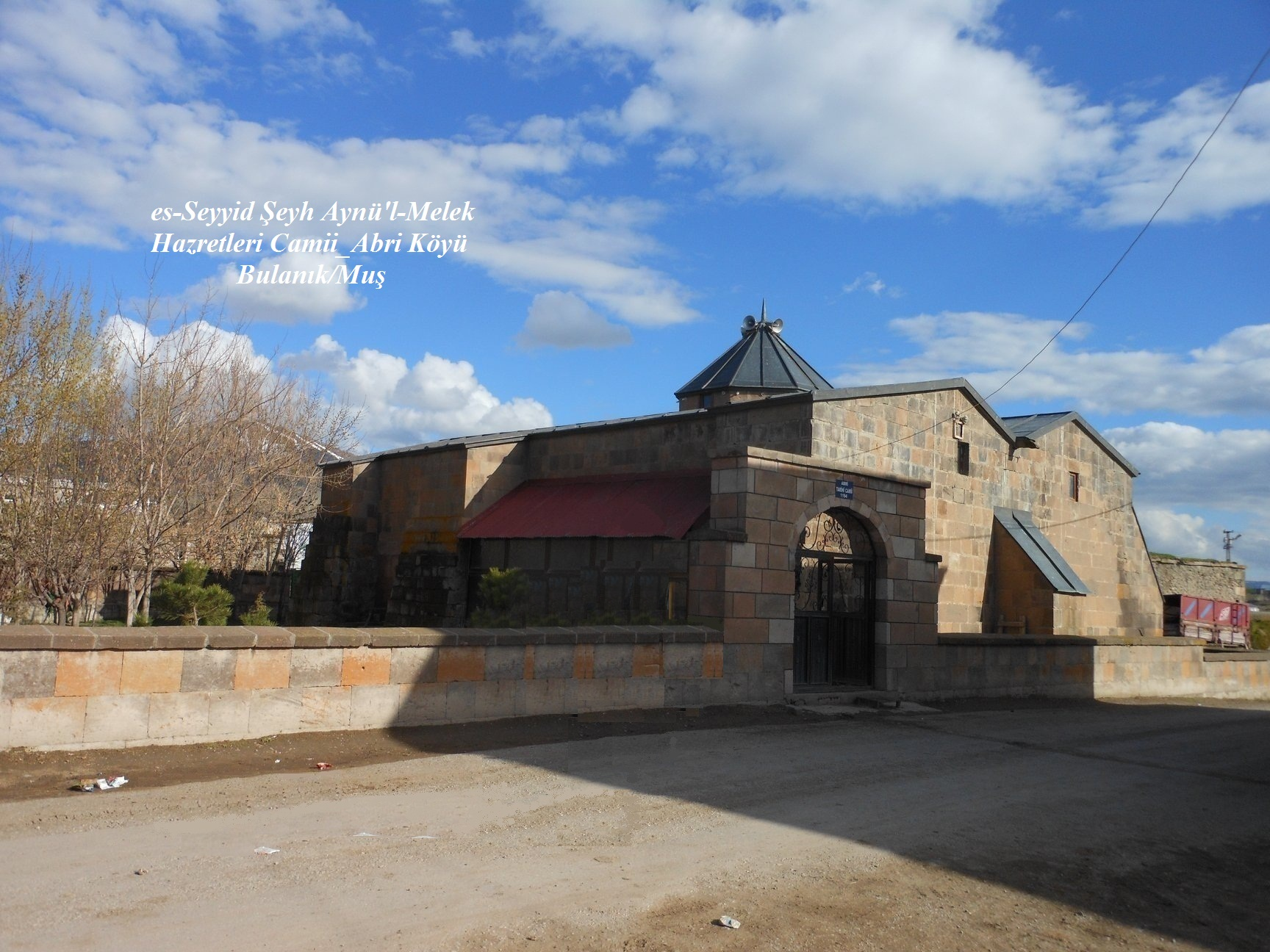
- Interactive map of Esenlik Mosque
- Location: Esenlik, Bulanık, Muş, Turkey
- Coordinates: 39°00′50″N 42°05′49″E
- Type: Monastery; Mosque (present)
- Material: Ahlat stone

Esenlik Mosque is a historical mosque in Esenlik, Bulanık, Muş, Turkey.

== History ==
It was built by the Seljuks. It was built by Sheikh Abdülmelik in 1194. Ahlat stone was used. It is a building with a single dome, four windows and two doors. It is understood from the inscription on the crown gate that the mosque was built by the Artuqids in 725/1325. The mosque was last restored in 1985 by the General Directorate of Foundations. Esenlik mosque was previously a monastery.

Şeyh Abdülmelik Mosque was built in 725 H./1325 A.D. according to the two-line Arabic inscription carved into stone, located on the crown gate in the north direction (Kulağuz, 1997, 46; Günes, 2003, 67–68). It is known that during the period in question, Sutaylis, whom Abu Said Bahadır Khan sent as governors, were dominant in Muş and Bulanık.

The construction of this holy mosque was ordered in the month of Rajab in the year 725, hoping for the consent of Allah almighty and wishing for much reward. (Kulağuz, 1997, 47; Güneş, 2003, 67-68).
