= Şêx Şemsedînê Exlatî =

Kurdish Sufi, poet and Sheikh (1558-1674)

Şêx Şemsedînê Exlatî or Xelwetî (Kurdish: شێخ شەمسەدینێئە خلاتی, romanized: Şêx Şemsedînê Exlatî, born in Ahlat; 1588–1674) was a Kurdish Sufi, poet, and Sheikh of the Xelwetî Sufi order. He wrote in Kurmanji. Despite not being as well known as his contemporaries Melayê Cizîrî and Feqiyê Teyran, his place in Kurdish literature has been deemed important.

== Biography ==
Exlatî was born in Ahlat near Bitlis in 1558 to an intellectual Kurdish family which adhered to the Naqshbandi order of Sufism. He studied in the Ahlat but also travelled around to study under the guidance of teachers as well. Due to the Ottoman–Safavid War, he settled among the Doskî tribe in the northern part of the Oremar mountain, but in 1620, he moved to Amadiya in Bahdinan with his brother. In Amadiya, he met the local ruler Sîdî Xan from the Ertuşî tribe, who asked him to settle in Birîfkanî to spread his Sufi beliefs after he became aware of his knowledge on religion. Sîdî Xan gave Xelatî seven homes who agreed to settle in the village. In Birfîkanî, Exlatî began spreading his religious Sufi beliefs which would be known as Xelwetî until his death in 1674. He died in Birîfkani, having lived a modest life. He had five sons.

== Poetry ==
Exlatî wrote in a complex Kurmanji, filled with 'closed' expressions. His main topics were Sufi metaphysics, rural life and nature.

== Bibliography ==
- Adak, Abdurrahman (2016), "Helbestvanên klasîk ji perspektîfa herêmî: Nimûneya herêma Bedlîsê", The Journal of Mesopotamian Studies, vol. 1
- Adak, Abdurrahman (2018), "Mexles di Edebiyata Kurdî ya Klasîk de", Mardin Artuklu University Faculty of Literature (in Kurdish)
- Bamed, Serdar (2015), Dîwana Şêx Şemsedînê Exlatî (in Kurdish), Nubihar Yayınları, ISBN 9786055053604
- Birîfkanî, Zahid (2001), Dîdarê Yar: Dîwana Şêx Şemsedînê Qutbê Exlatî yê Birîfkanî (in Kurdish), Weşanên Roja Nû
- Sezer, Müslih (2016), Ji herêma Behdînanê helbestkarekî pirziman: Seyfiyê Şoşî (in Kurdish), vol. 2, Bingöl University
