= Esenlik, Bulanık =

Village in Muş Province, Turkey

Esenlik
- Village
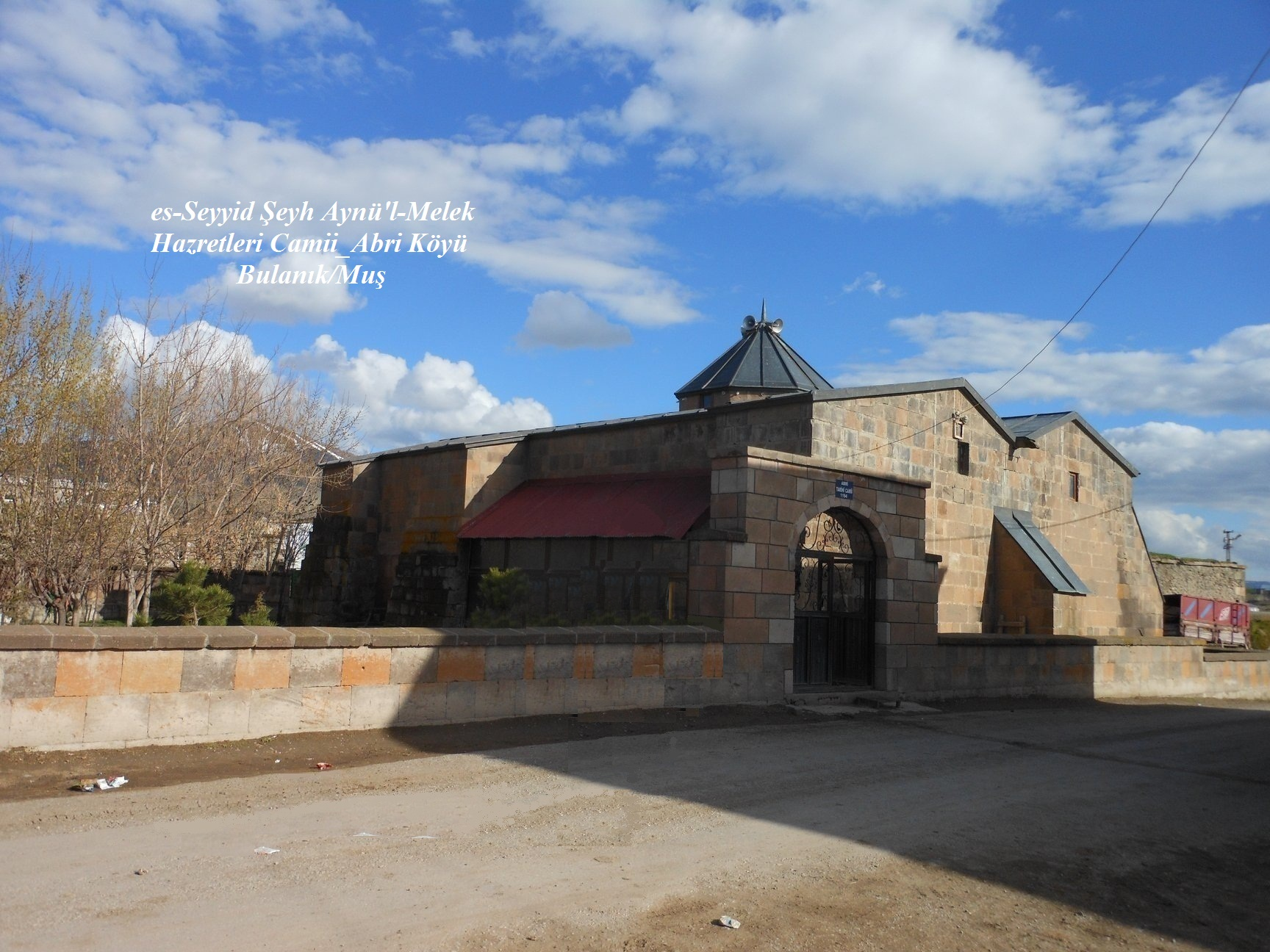
- View of Esenlik Mosque

- Location within Turkey
- Coordinates: 39.01244°N 42.09674°E
- Country: Turkey
- Province: Muş
- District: Bulanık
- Population (2022): 1,227
- Time zone: UTC+3 (TRT)

Esenlik (Kurdish: Avbirî, Armenian: Ապրի, romanized: Apri) is a village in the Bulanık District, Muş Province, in east Turkey. Its population is 1,227 (2022).

== History ==
There is Esenlik Mosque from Seljuk in Esenlik. It was built by Sheikh Abdülmelik in 1194 with Ahlat stones. The mosque was last restored by the Directorate General of Foundations in 1985.

== Geology and geography ==
Esenlik and the plateau used for animal husbandry are located on the Bilican Mountains.
