= Emir Bayındır Tomb =

Tomb in Ahlat, Bitlis, Turkey

Coordinates: 38°44′50″N 42°27′32″E

- Emir Bayındır Kümbeti
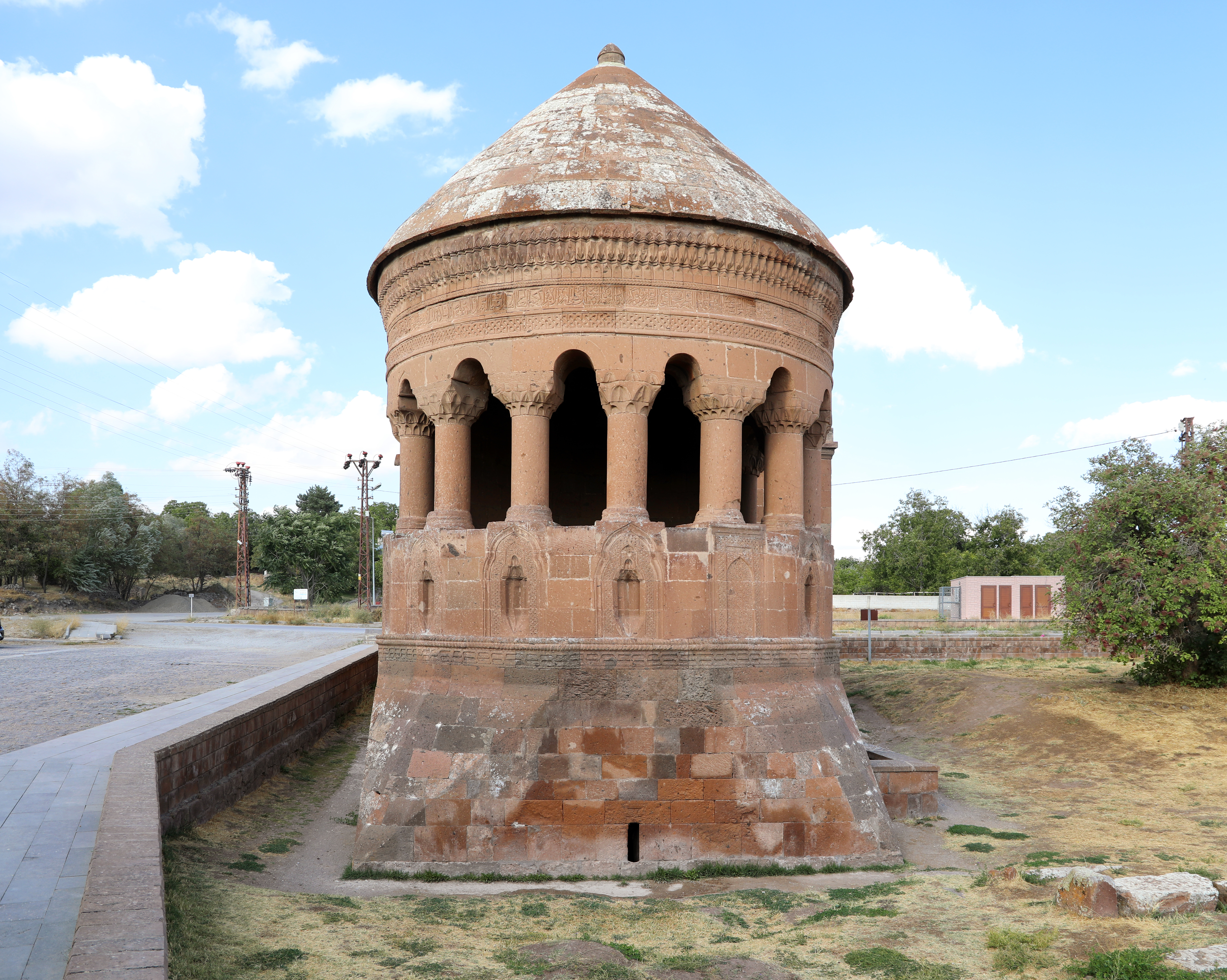
- Southwest view of the Emir Bayındır Mausoleum (September 2022)
- Interactive map of the Emir Bayındır Tomb area

General information
- Type: Mausoleum
- Architectural style: Aq Qoyunlu
- Location: Ahlat, Turkey
- Completed: 1480s
- Owner: Directorate General of Foundations (Turkey)

Height
- Height: Roof: 9.87 m; Finial: 10.30 m

Dimensions
- Diameter: Interior (visitor area): 4.7 m
- Other dimensions: Base: 6.23 × 6.32 × 6.36 × 6.49 m

Technical details
- Structural system: Masonry
- Material: Stone
- Floor count: 2
- Floor area: Tomb chamber: 23 m^{2}; Visitor area: 17.45 m^{2}

Design and construction
- Architect: Baba Can (attributed)

The Emir Bayındır Tomb (Turkish: Emir Bayındır Kümbeti), also known as the Parmaklıklı Tomb (Turkish: Parmaklıklı Kümbet), is the tomb of Emir Bayındır bin Rüstem, a bey of the Aq Qoyunlu dynasty, located in Ahlat. According to its inscription, the mausoleum was commissioned by his wife, Şah Selime Hatun, following Bayındır's death in October or November of 1481. The tomb also houses the remains of their son, Muhammad, who died in December 1488 or January 1489. At the time of its construction, the structure was part of a larger complex that included a mosque and a zawiya. Although the architect of the mausoleum is unknown, some scholars suggest that Baba Can—known to have designed the mosque within the complex—may have also been responsible for the mausoleum's design.

== History ==
According to its epitaph, the mausoleum was commissioned by Şah Selime Hatun, the wife of Emir Bayındır bin Rüstem of the Aq Qoyunlu dynasty, to serve as his burial place after his death in October or November 1481. (Note: The year of Ramadan 886 inscribed on the mausoleum corresponds to October or November 1481 in the Gregorian calendar.) (Note: In his 1937 work Anadolu Beylikleri ve Akkoyunlu, Karakoyunlu Devletleri, İsmail Hakkı Uzunçarşılı mistakenly referred to the structure as the "Tomb of Baysungur Bey, son of Rüstem Bey.") The tomb also contains the remains of his son, Muhammed, who died in December 1488 or January 1489. (Note: The year of Muharram 894 inscribed on the mausoleum corresponds to December 1488 or January 1489 in the Gregorian calendar.) Although it is rumored that Bayındır's father, Rüstem, was also buried in the mausoleum, there is no definitive information regarding the identity of the third person buried there. At the time of its construction, the structure was part of a larger complex that included a mosque and a zawiya.
