= Cave dwellings of Ahlat =

Caves of archaeological significance

- Ahlat Mağara Evleri
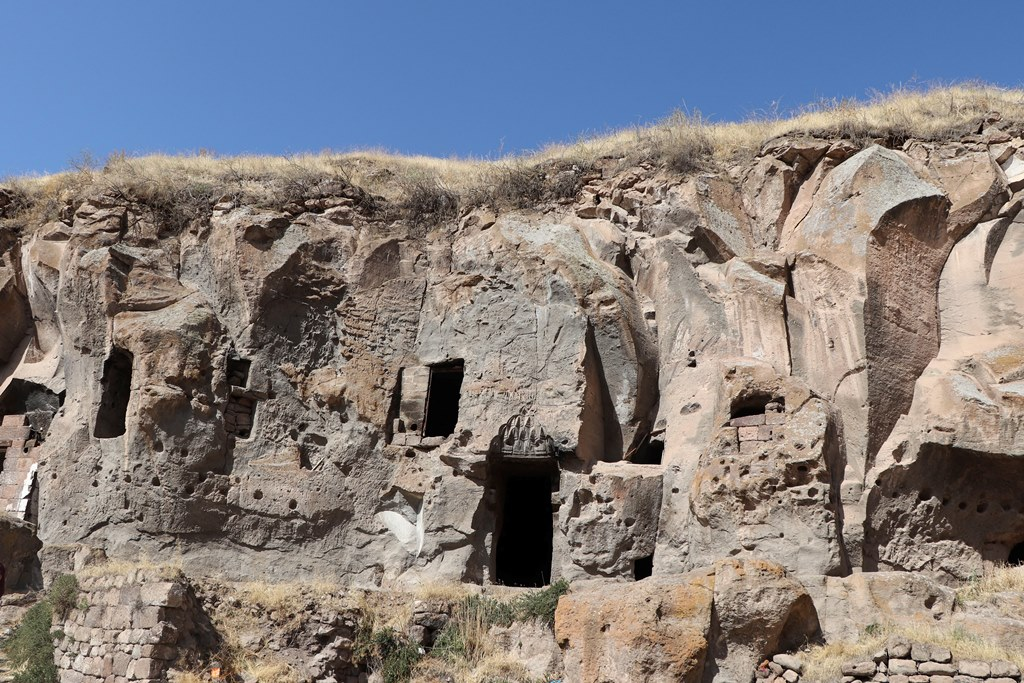
- Cave dwellings of Ahlat at Harabeşehir Creek

- Location of Ahlat cave dwellings in Turkey.
- 38.74610°N 42.45376°E
- Type: Cave dwellings
- Periods: Neolithic
- Location: Ahlat, Bitlis Province, Turkey
- Region: Eastern Anatolia region

The cave dwellings of Ahlat (Turkish: Ahlat Mağara Evleri) are hundreds of caves located in Ahlat district of Bitlis Province, eastern Turkey, which were used as dwellings in the prehistory.

There are about 500–600 caves located in various parts of Ahlat, around 3.6 km (2.2 mi) southwest. Generally, they are situated in two main canyons, at Madavans Creek in Madavansans Canyon, at Harabeşehir Creek in Harabeşehir Canyon, and Sultan Seyit Creek, Kırklar Valley, at Gaban Creek Valley around Yuvadamı village and Harabe Hulik village. The area was declared a first-grade archaeological site. However, the caves are private property. Currently, they are used as storage of potato and food because they remain cool in the summer months and warm in the winter season.

It is assumed by scientists that "the caves were used from the Neolithic Age on as Ahlat was one of the first populated places in Anatolia. The severe earthquakes that have taken place in the region, the need for settlement in wetlands due to drought, destruction of settlements after war and invasions, and severe climatic conditions have influenced the emergence of cave settlements." Archaeological surveys revealed that the group of cave dwellings includes the earliest example of a Buddhist temple in Anatolia.

In 2013, the local authority started a study for a project to open the area to tourism. Titled "Ecotourism Project for Harabeşehir area", the investment of around ₺ 450 million (approx. US$ 14 million) features the establishment of observation hills, bungalows for resting, housing areas, walking tracks, cafeterias, restaurants and lodging center.
