= Ahlat =

- Municipality
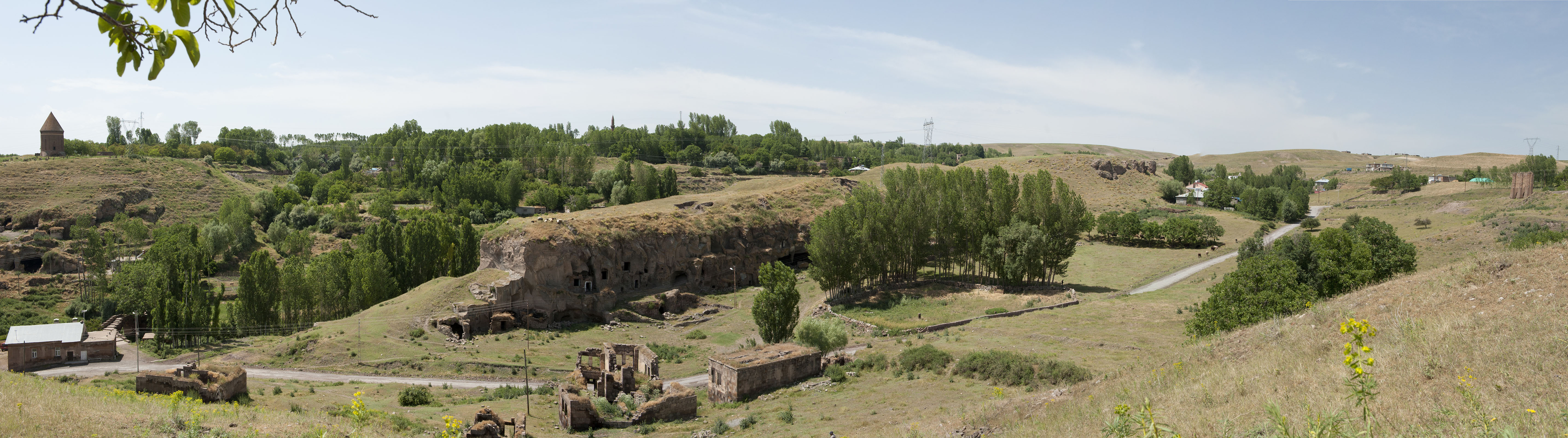
- A panoramic view of Ahlat.

- Location within Turkey
- Coordinates: 38°45′10″N 42°29′40″E
- Country: Turkey
- Province: Bitlis
- District: Ahlat

Government
  - Mayor: Abdulalim Mümtaz Çoban (AKP)
- Elevation: 1,650 m (5,410 ft)
- Population (2021): 27,563
- Time zone: UTC+3 (TRT)
- Postal code: 13400
- Website: www.ahlat.bel.tr

Ahlat (Kurdish: Xelat; Armenian: Խլաթ, romanized: Khlat) is a town in Turkey's Bitlis Province in Eastern Anatolia region. It is the seat of Ahlat District. The town had a population of 27,563 in 2021. The town of Ahlat is situated on the northwestern shore of Lake Van. The mayor is Abdulalim Mümtaz Çoban (AKP).

== Geography ==
In terms of size, Khlat (Ahlat) was second only to Van among the cities located on the shores of Lake Van. It is situated on the western coast of the lake, on an elevated plateau, with several small rivers and streams rushing toward Lake Van through its eastern and western parts. Its location is picturesque. To the south, the panorama of the city is enhanced by Lake Van (which was also called the Lake of Khlat), while to the southwest and northwest, the beacons of the Muş and Manazkert plains—Mount Nemrut and Mount Sipan—bound the city's horizon.

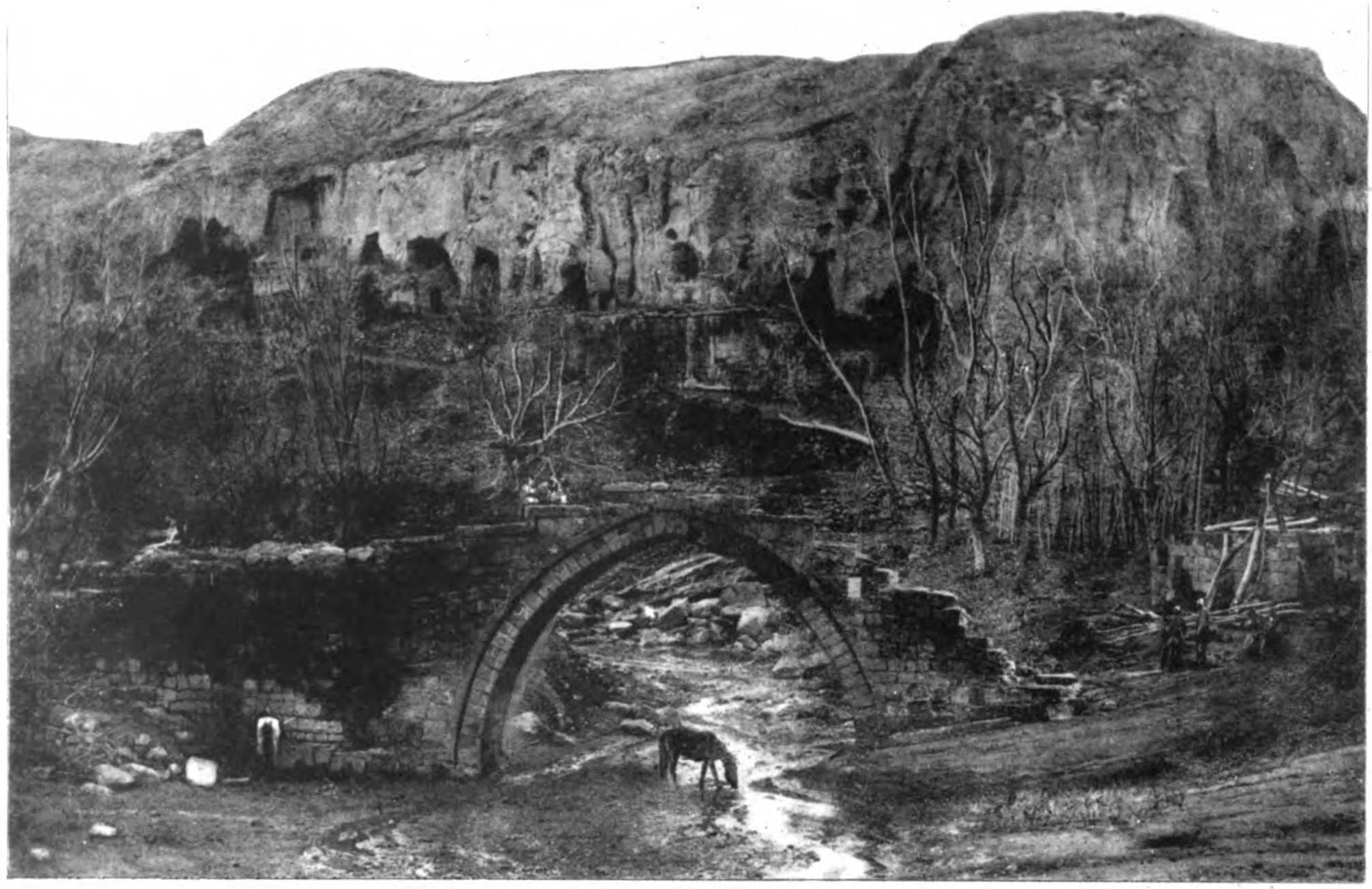
Ahlat in 1895

== History ==
Ahlat is one of the oldest settlements in Armenia, and it is difficult to determine exactly when it was founded. Initially, it was mentioned as a town (village-town), but it later transformed into a major city that had its own strong fortress and was considered the largest port on Lake Van.

Dozens of Armenian and foreign chroniclers provide extensive information about Khlat, including Stepanos Asoghik, Aristakes Lastivertsi, Vardan Areveltsi, Kirakos Gandzaketsi, Grigor Khlatetsi, Matthew of Edessa, Yaqut, Ibn al-Athir, John Skylitzes, and others. Aristakes Lastivertsi considers it one of the largest cities in 11th-century Armenia, while the famous Arabic chronicler Yaqut describes Ahlat as a "strong and renowned city," "endowed with all kinds of blessings." They speak of it with particularly high praise as a port and a well-fortified fortress-city. The city's defensive wall was commonly described as a massive, turreted structure with three gates.

Authors from different periods and nationalities have referred to Khlat by various names and variations of the same name, such as Allarkh, Ikhlat, and others. In ancient Armenian literature, it was sometimes called the "City of Bznunik" (or Kaghak Bznunyats). The Turks usually call it Ahlat, a name they adopted from the Arabs. According to the 11th-century Arabic chronicler Ibn al-Athir, the Arabs called the city Khlat (meaning "mixed") supposedly because its inhabitants were not homogenous and spoke three languages: Arabic, Persian, and Armenian.

Ahlat, which was known in ancient and medieval times by its Armenian names Khlat or Chliat, was once a part of the Bznunik province. During the period of the Armenian Kingdom from the first to the fifth centuries and subsequently until the last quarter of the eighth century, Ahlat belonged to the Bznuni noble house and served as the chief city of the Bznunik province. Following the anti-Arab rebellion of 773–775, when the Bznuni family, along with several other Armenian noble houses, lost their political influence, the Bznunik province and its center, Ahlat, passed under the control of the Bagratunis of Taron by the late eighth or early ninth century. During the reign of King Smbat I Bagratuni from 890 to 914, the city was fully liberated from Arab rule, and its ancient, pre-existing fortress was reconstructed. Approximately around this period, along with numerous other Armenian cities, Ahlat entered its era of resurgence, and within a relatively short span of time during the tenth and eleventh centuries, it grew into one of the country's largest and most populous cities. The city was first captured by the Arabs during the reign of Caliph Uthman between 644 and 656. In 645, Uthman ordered Mu'awiya ibn Abi Sufyan, the governor of Syria, to send Habib ibn Maslama al-Fihri on an expedition into Byzantine-controlled Armenia, though some sources claim the Caliph instructed Habib directly. Over the next four centuries, Ahlat was ruled alternatively by Arab governors, Armenian princes, and Arab emirs of the Qays tribe. At the beginning of the eighth century, Arab tribes settled in the region, and Ahlat became part of the Kaysite Emirate. The geographer Ibn Hawqal, who died around 978, mentioned Ahlat as an important stop on the Urmia-Mayyafariqin trade route. By around 983, Ahlat came under the control of the Kurdish leader Bāḏ, who is referred to as Bat in Armenian sources, and after this, the city became associated with the Kurdish Marwanid dynasty centered in Diyarbekir, which descended from Bāḏ. In the winter of 998, Curopalates David III of Tao, besieged Ahlat but failed to capture it, partly due to his dismissive attitude toward the local Armenian population. In 1057, after breaking ties with Emperor Michael VI, the Norman mercenary Herve Phrangopoulos retreated here with three hundred Norman knights, but he was ultimately betrayed by the city's emir, Aponosar, also known as Abu Nasr. The rapid development of Ahlat was heavily driven by its status as a major port on Lake Van and its strategic location on the vital highway linking Artskesh to Baghesh. By the first half of the eleventh century, it had evolved into a major hub for craftsmanship and trade, boasting a population of several tens of thousands of residents. During this prosperous era, the peace of the city was disrupted only once, in 997, when David, the Curopalates of Taik, launched an attack on Ahlat with the intent of conquering it and annexing it to his vast principality. However, his forces suffered a humiliating defeat under the city walls and were forced to retreat empty-handed.

From 1000 AD when the city was granted to the Artsrunis by the Byzantine Emperor Basil II its natural course of development continued until the Seljuk invasions of the 70s of the eleventh century when it was captured and destroyed by the latter. After the Battle of Manzikert in 1071 the Seljuk army under the personal leadership of Sultan Alp Arslan who ruled from 1063 to 1072 took possession of the city. Subsequently the Seljuks handed over control of the city to the Turkmen slave-commander Sökmen el-Kutbî. Sokman and his successors were known as the Shah-Armens or Ahlat-shahs and they made Ahlat their capital. In the eleventh century the city of Ahlat written in Persian as Axlāt is mentioned in the records of Nasir Khusraw in his Safarnama. According to data from the Institute of Ismaili Studies which references Thackston's translation of Nasir-i Khusraw’s Book of Travels the extract reads as follows. From there from Harran we arrived at the city of Ahlat on the eighteenth of Jumada al-Awwal November 20. This city is a boundary point between Muslims and Armenians and is nineteen farsakhs away from Bekri. The prince Nasruddawla was over one hundred years old and had many sons to each of whom he had given a region. In the city of Ahlat they speak three languages Arabic Persian and Armenian. In my estimation it is for this very reason that they named the city Ahlat meaning mixture. Their commercial transactions are carried out in phouls which are possibly ancient Roman and Greek coins and their rotel the Armenian currency is equivalent to three hundred dirhams. In the year 1100 the Shaharmens captured Ahlat and made it the capital of their vast sultanate. Their dominion here lasted until the 30s of the thirteenth century up until the Mongol invasions. At the beginning of the thirteenth century when Northern Armenia was liberated from the Seljuk yoke and a semi-independent powerful principality was formed there under the leadership of the Zakarian princes attempts were made by the initiative of the same princes to also liberate the central parts of the country including Ahlat and its surroundings. For that purpose Zakare II and Ivane I Zakarian took the lead of an Armenian-Georgian army in 1210 and campaigned toward the shores of Lake Van and Ahlat. However that campaign of the Zakarian brothers ended in failure. Khlat again remained under foreign yoke Ivane was captured by the sultan and was released only after the threat made by Zakare.

Due to the new political turmoil caused by the decline of the Seljuks and the invasions of the Khwarazmshah and the Mongol Empire Ahlat briefly became a subject of dispute among the Ayyubids the Kingdom of Georgia and the Sultanate of Rum which was the Anatolian branch of the Seljuk dynasty. In the twelfth century Ahlat and its adjacent territory were conquered and reduced to vassal dependency by the Kingdom of Georgia. During this period the Georgians called the city Khlati which was a modified version of the local Armenian name Ahlat. After the Battle of Köse Dağ in 1243 and the fall of Baghdad in 1258 Ahlat along with Eastern Anatolia and Upper Mesopotamia became a part of the Mongol Empire. The Mongols included Ahlat within the Ilkhanate also known as the Hulaguid state and during the subsequent period the khans of the Ilkhanate minted coins in Khlat. According to Hamdallah Mustawfi who died in 1349 the revenues received from Ahlat under the Ilkhanids amounted to up to 51,500 dinars. After the Ilkhanate Ahlat became part of the Jalayirid state and then part of the Ak Koyunlu state.

The decline of Ahlat begins from the 30s of the thirteenth century It can be said that the conquests of Jalal al-Din and the Mongols had a fatal significance for the city Jalal al-Din having captured Ahlat in 1230 subjects it to terrible destruction. The Mongol conquest of 1245 is in no way different from it as a result of which with the traces of the previous destruction not yet eliminated the city is subjected to fire and sword. The lack of destruction carried out by Jalal al-Din and the Mongols is compensated for by the destructive earthquake that took place in 1246 which turns most of the city structures into ruins claiming a large number of human casualties. Partly due to these and partly due to the general decline of economic and cultural life initiated in the country as a consequence of heavy foreign rule Ahlat is also dragged into decline. Along the sixteenth and fifteenth centuries the city had in fact turned back into an obscure settlement although chroniclers out of force of habit continued to call it a city Ahlat was one of the apples of discord of the prolonged Ottoman-Persian wars of the sixteenth and seventeenth centuries. At the beginning of the 16th century the Ottomans expanded into Eastern Anatolia Western Armenia during the days of Sultan Selim I who ruled from 1512 to 1520 taking the city under their control for the first time. Nevertheless at that time Ahlat was only weakly subject to Ottoman control since it was viewed as a border region between the Ottoman Empire and the Safavid state In 1526 during the reign of Shah Tahmasp I who ruled from 1524 to 1576. Ahlat was in the hands of the Safavids and its governor was Delu Montasha Ustajlu. In 1533 during the Ottoman–Safavid War of 1532–1555 Ahlat was captured by the Ottoman army under the leadership of Grand Vizier Pargalı Ibrahim Pasha. In 1548 Ahlat was recaptured by the Safavids who subsequently plundered it. During the reign of Suleiman the Magnificent who ruled from 1520 to 1566 Ahlat finally became a stable part of the Ottoman Empire. Suleiman I after recapturing the city reconstructs its fortress but it had received a destructive blow and never reaches its former state again. However in practice Ahlat de facto remained under the control of various local Kurdish leaders until the middle of the 19th century when the Ottoman central government of Constantinople established direct rule in the city. During this time it became one of the centers of the Naqshbandi order of Sufism. Vital Cuinet at the end of the 19th century estimated the population of Ahlat at 23,700 people. According to Cuinet seventy percent were Muslims and the rest were Christians mainly Armenians. When Cuinet was passing through the city during that period old Ahlat was considered abandoned and was called Harab Sehir that is ruined city Later on the shore of Lake Van at a distance of about two kilometers to the east a new city was formed which in 1961 had 5,018 inhabitants.

During the Circassian genocide several Circassian refugees from the North Caucasus were settled in the region of Ahlat and founded several villages. Within the framework of the deportations of Kurds between 1916 and 1934 the Kurds of Ahlat were deported toward Diyarbekir due to disloyalty toward the Committee of Union and Progress Back in 1846 it had been noted by Ottoman officials that the city could be used to control the Kurds with an iron fist since it was located in the heart of Kurdistan.

Modern Period

Ahlat and its surroundings are famous for a large number of historical tombstones which were left by the Ahlatshah dynasty which is also known as the Shah-Armen dynasty. Currently efforts are being made by local authorities toward to including the Tombstones of Ahlat the Urartian and Ottoman citadel on UNESCO's World Heritage List, where they are now registered as candidate sites. In recent years Ahlat has also become famous for the quality of its potatoes which have captured a significant share in the Turkish agricultural product market.

It is strange but a fact that our information about Ahlat of modern times is poor. It is enough to say that even the information that has reached us regarding its population size is far from being reliable if we consider their glaring differences. The following data can be considered more or less probable In the years 1800 to 1810 the city had about 7 thousand inhabitants of whom 5000 were armenians in 1850 it had 5 thousand inhabitants of whom 4000 were armenians in 1891 it had 23659 of whom 6609 were armenians 16635 were Kurds and Turks and 415 people were others. And toward the end of the 60s of our century Ahlat which is an ordinary provincial town the center of the district of the same name had only 12 thousand inhabitants the greatest part of whom was composed of Kurds. The occupations of the inhabitants of Ahlat of modern times consisted of agriculture viticulture fishing trade craftsmanship and partly salt extraction.

== Culture ==
From the monuments of historical Ahlat there have been preserved caves carved in the rocks near the city several towers of the defensive wall located on the seashore ruins of various buildings which are mainly located in the district currently called Kharaba Shahar ruined city on the site of old Ahlat. At the edge of the city an extensive cemetery of Arab times is preserved with giant tombstones having inscriptions. According to tradition those buried there had attacked our country and David of Sasun destroyed them all Apart from the fortress and its defensive structures from the other monuments of Ahlat the churches of Holy Cross and Gamaghiel which was once an episcopal seat located outside the city and the only mosque are worthy of attention Although Ahlat presented a picture of decline in the XV century it remained as a significant center of Armenian culture.

The monastery was known for its scribal tradition. Among the manuscripts copied here during the XV century more than 10 are known to us 3 of which are Bibles 2 are Gospels 2 are Haysmvurk and so on. Particularly famous was the scribe Priest Karapet who acted in the first half of the XV century Grigor Khlatetsi 1349-1425 was born in Ahlat whom one of the armenian scribes of the XVII century characterizes in his colophon as extremely vigorous genius native of the word. Yes Grigor Khlatetsi is one of the prominent figures of armenian culture a chronicler educator poet musician public figure.

== Sights ==
The tourist sights of Ahlat are the Cifte Kumbet Twin Tombs,Ahlat Seljuk Cemetery,the Emir Bayındır Tomb, Ahlat Museum, Lake Nemrut and the Cave dwellings of Ahlat. Ahlat is one of the sacred cities of Muslims. For its importance it has been worthy of the title Dome of Islam.

== Demographics ==
In 1891 the kaza had 23,659 inhabitants: 16,635 Muslims; 6,609 Armenians; and 415 others. The city was then almost abandoned with only 200 houses on the eve of the First World War, including 15 Armenian houses. The city includes Kurds of the Bekiran tribe and Karapapakhs.

== Climate ==
Ahlat has a dry summer humid continental climate according to the Koppen classification Dsa, with very hot dry summers and cold snowy winters.

Climate data for Ahlat (1991–2020)
Month	Jan	Feb	Mar	Apr	May	Jun	Jul	Aug	Sep	Oct	Nov	Dec	Year
Mean daily maximum °C (°F)	1.4 (34.5)	2.0 (35.6)	5.8 (42.4)	11.5 (52.7)	17.4 (63.3)	23.8 (74.8)	28.3 (82.9)	28.9 (84.0)	24.1 (75.4)	17.0 (62.6)	9.3 (48.7)	3.7 (38.7)	14.5 (58.1)
Daily mean °C (°F)	−2.3 (27.9)	−1.9 (28.6)	1.8 (35.2)	7.1 (44.8)	12.3 (54.1)	17.9 (64.2)	22.1 (71.8)	22.5 (72.5)	17.7 (63.9)	11.6 (52.9)	4.8 (40.6)	0.0 (32.0)	9.5 (49.1)
Mean daily minimum °C (°F)	−5.6 (21.9)	−5.5 (22.1)	−1.9 (28.6)	3.0 (37.4)	7.3 (45.1)	11.6 (52.9)	15.4 (59.7)	16.0 (60.8)	11.6 (52.9)	6.9 (44.4)	1.1 (34.0)	−3.1 (26.4)	4.8 (40.6)
Average precipitation mm (inches)	40.05 (1.58)	44.99 (1.77)	60.27 (2.37)	81.94 (3.23)	59.47 (2.34)	19.11 (0.75)	5.79 (0.23)	3.5 (0.14)	13.45 (0.53)	52.75 (2.08)	54.6 (2.15)	46.86 (1.84)	482.78 (19.01)
Average precipitation days (≥ 1.0 mm)	6.9	7.8	9.6	10.8	9.3	3.2	1.9	1.6	2.3	7.0	6.5	7.1	74.0
Average relative humidity (%)	75.0	74.9	72.1	67.7	62.3	51.8	46.2	44.4	49.1	62.9	69.5	74.8	62.5
Source: NOAA

Mother tongue, Ahlat District, 1927 Turkish census
Turkish	Arabic	Kurdish	Circassian	Armenian	Unknown or other languages
3,646	–	4,088	209	–	13

Religion, Ahlat District, 1927 Turkish census
Muslim	Armenian	Jewish	Other Christian
7,959	–	–	–

== Gallery ==
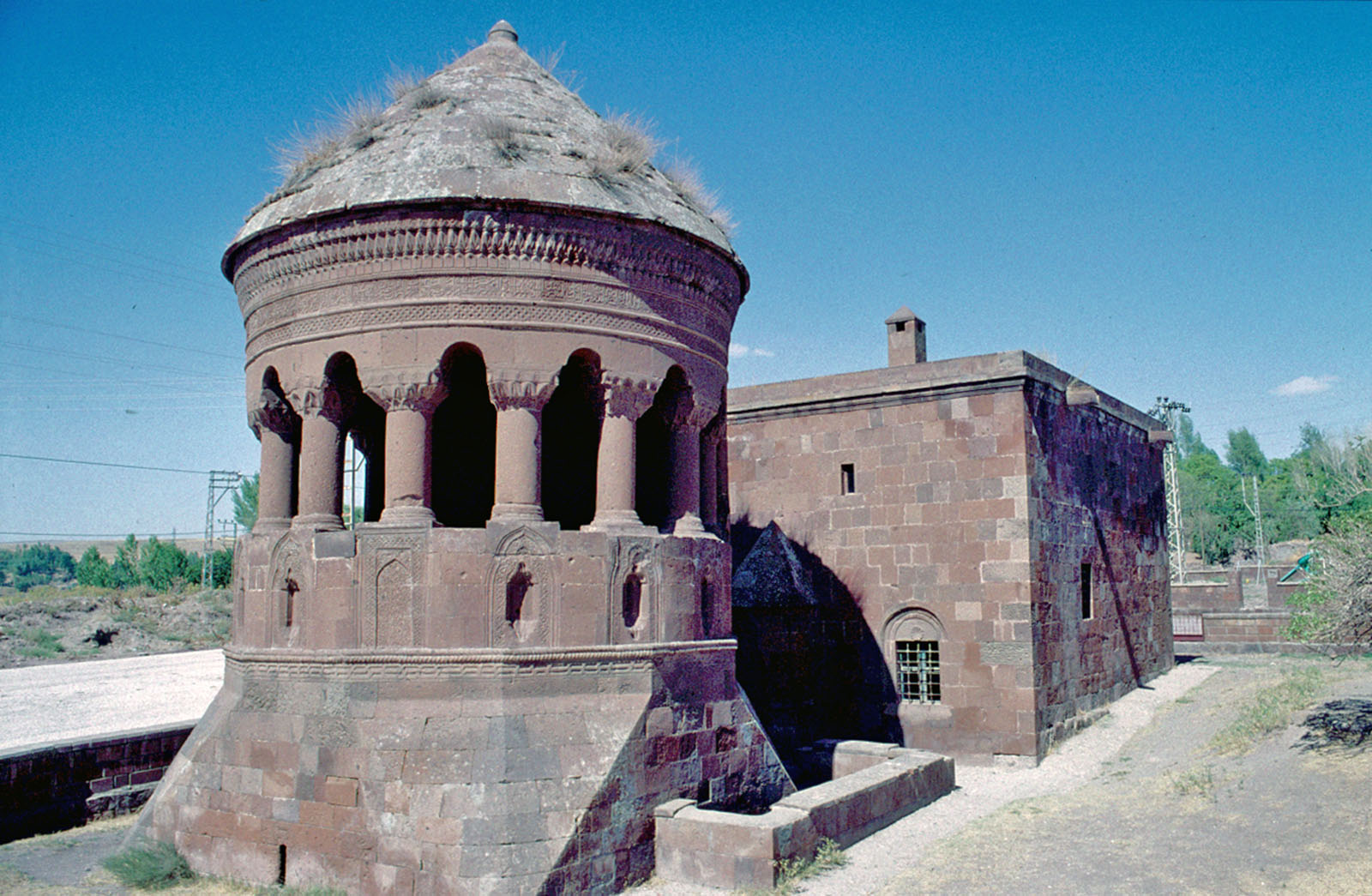
Ahlat Bayindir kümbet

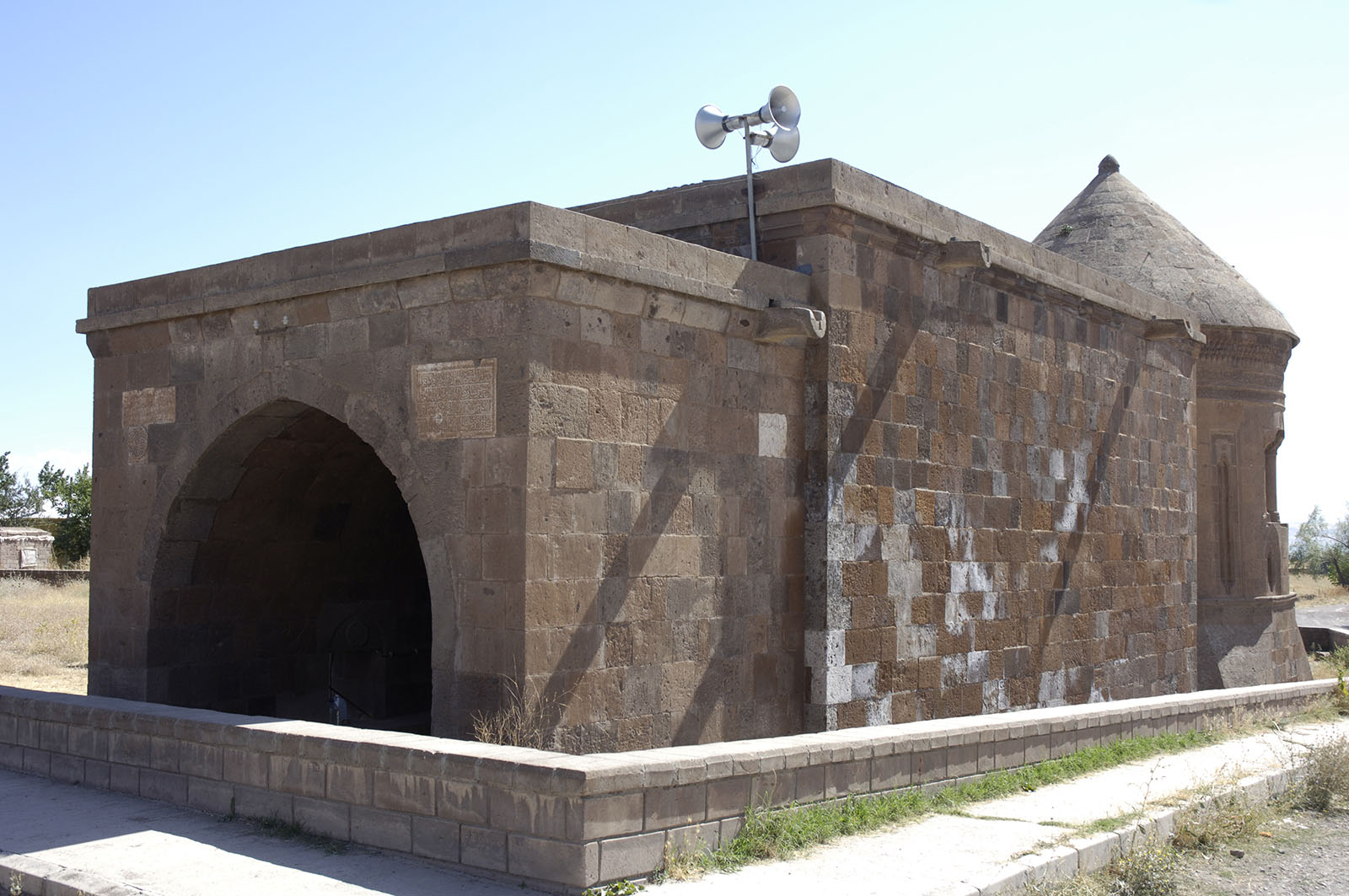
Ahlat Bayindir kümbet and mosque

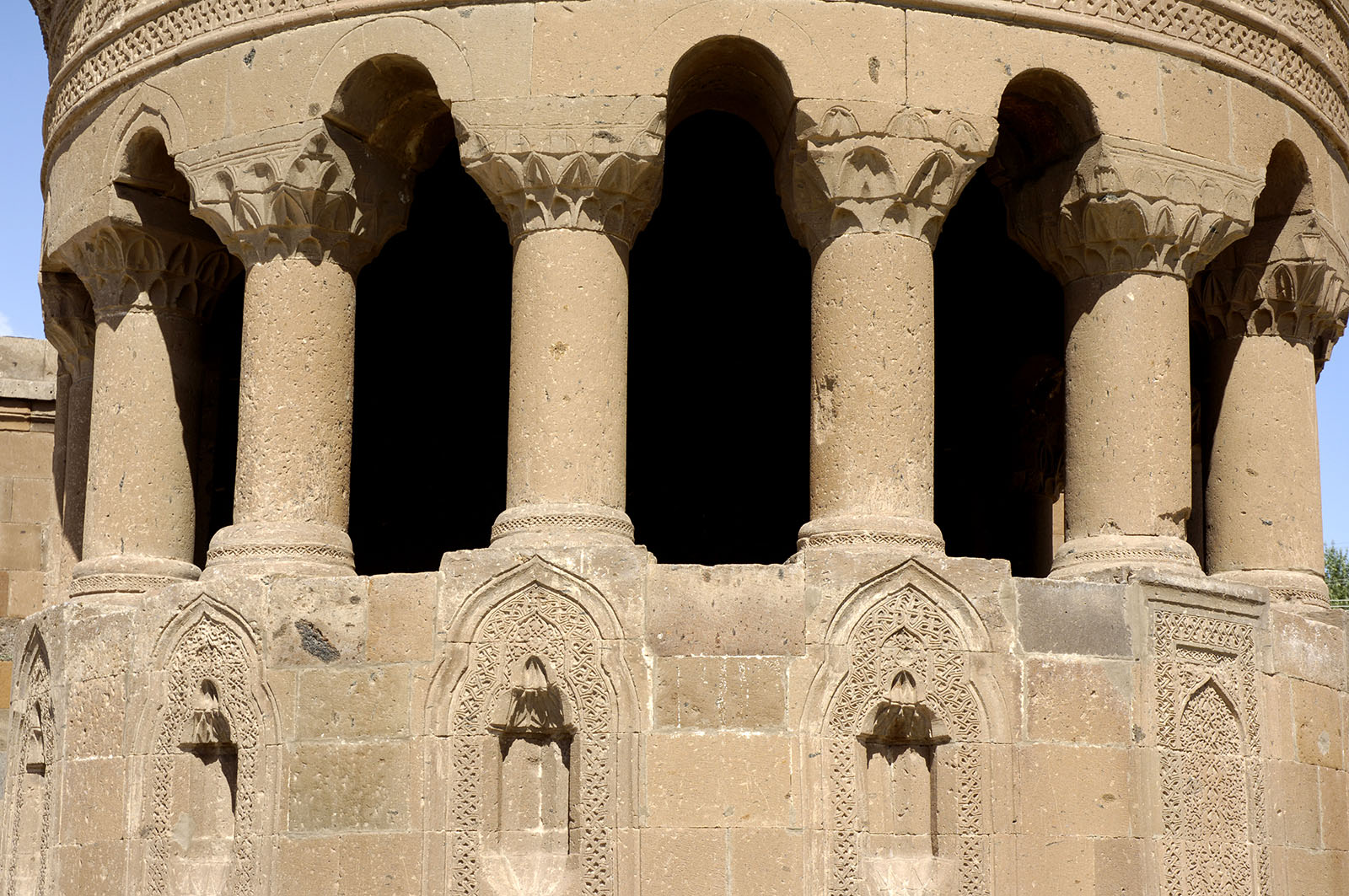
Ahlat Bayindir kümbet Detail

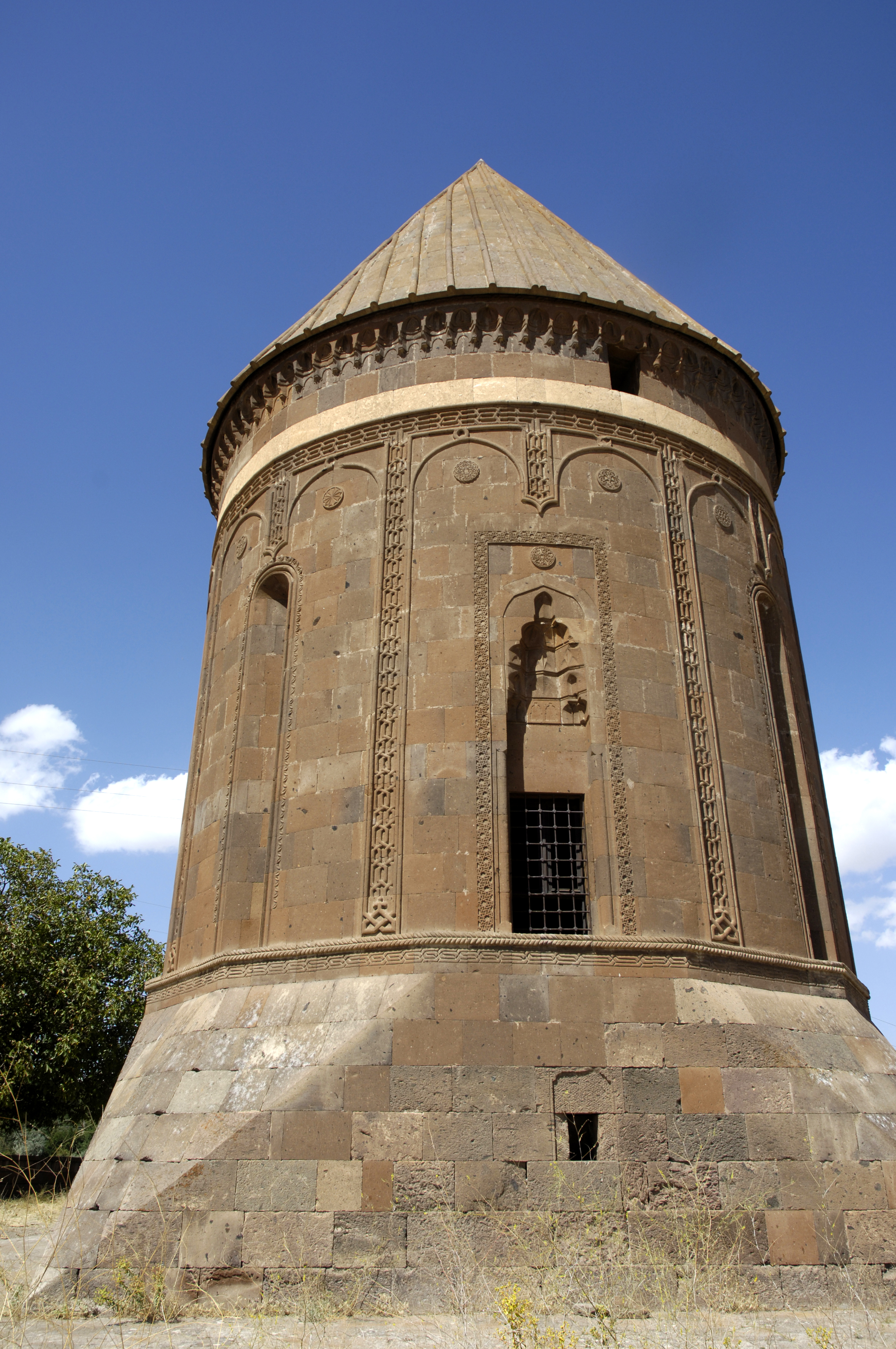
Ahlat Hasan Padişah Kümbeti

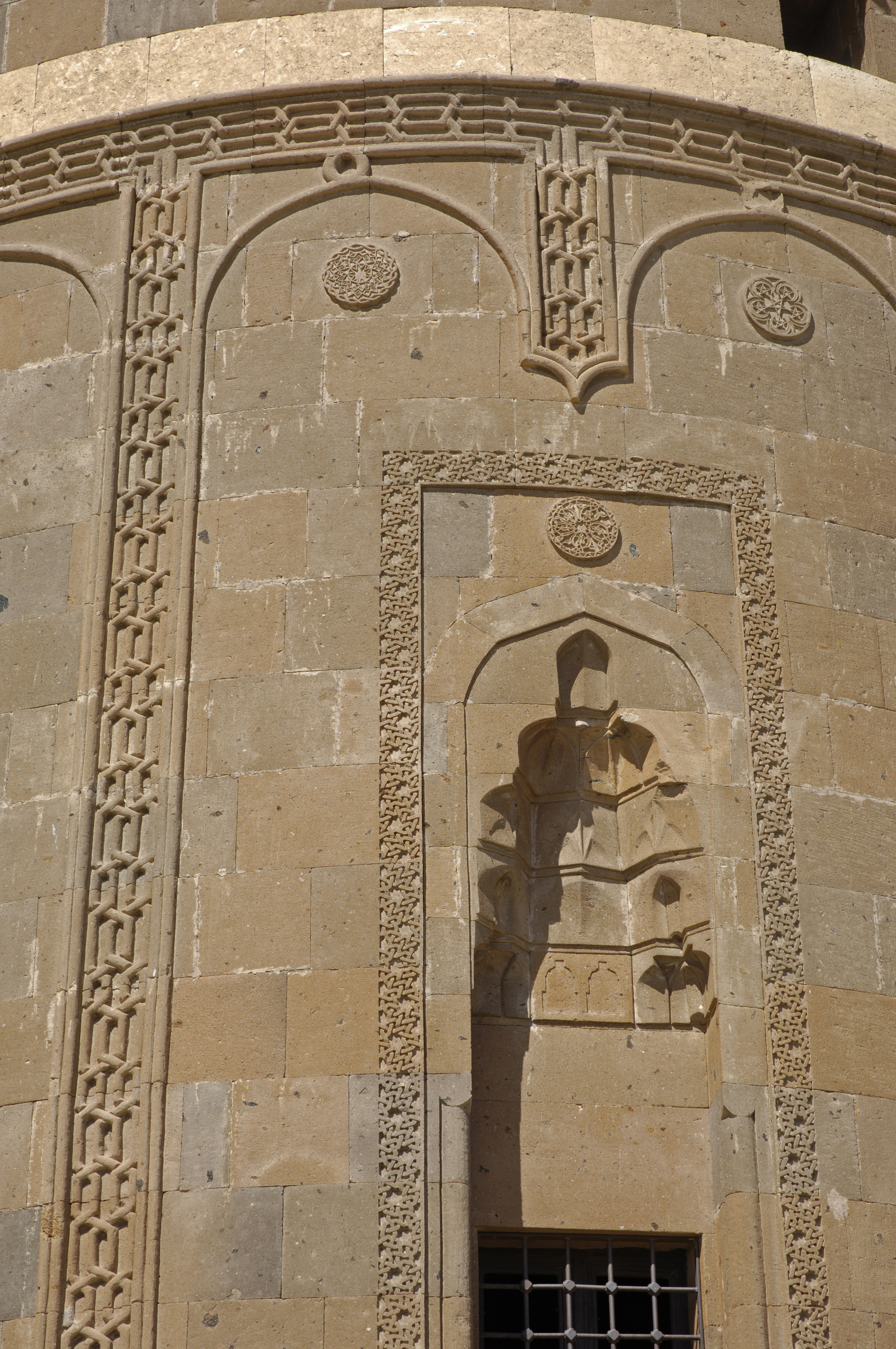
Ahlat Hasan Padişah Kümbeti details

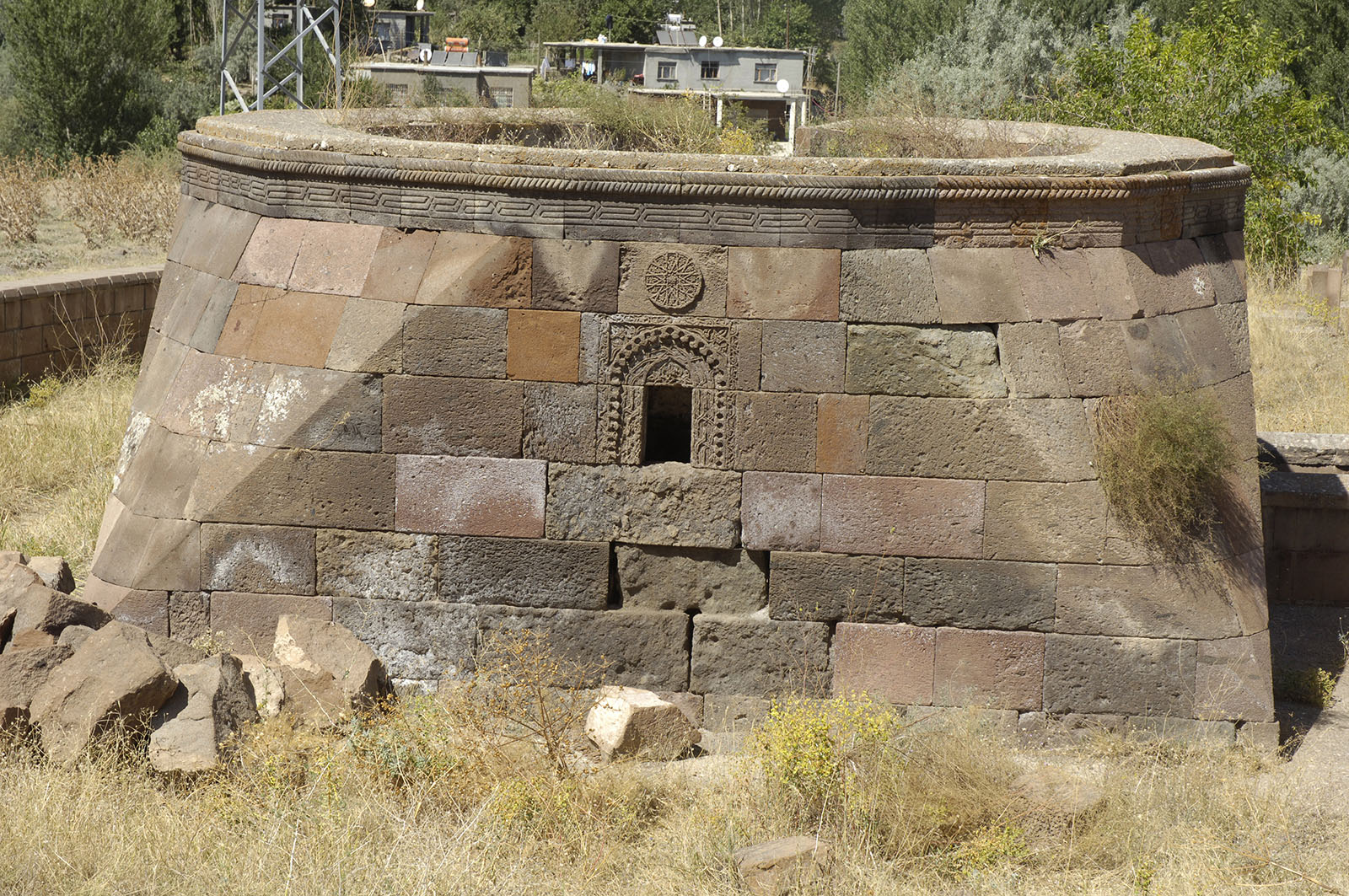
Ahlat Kümbet

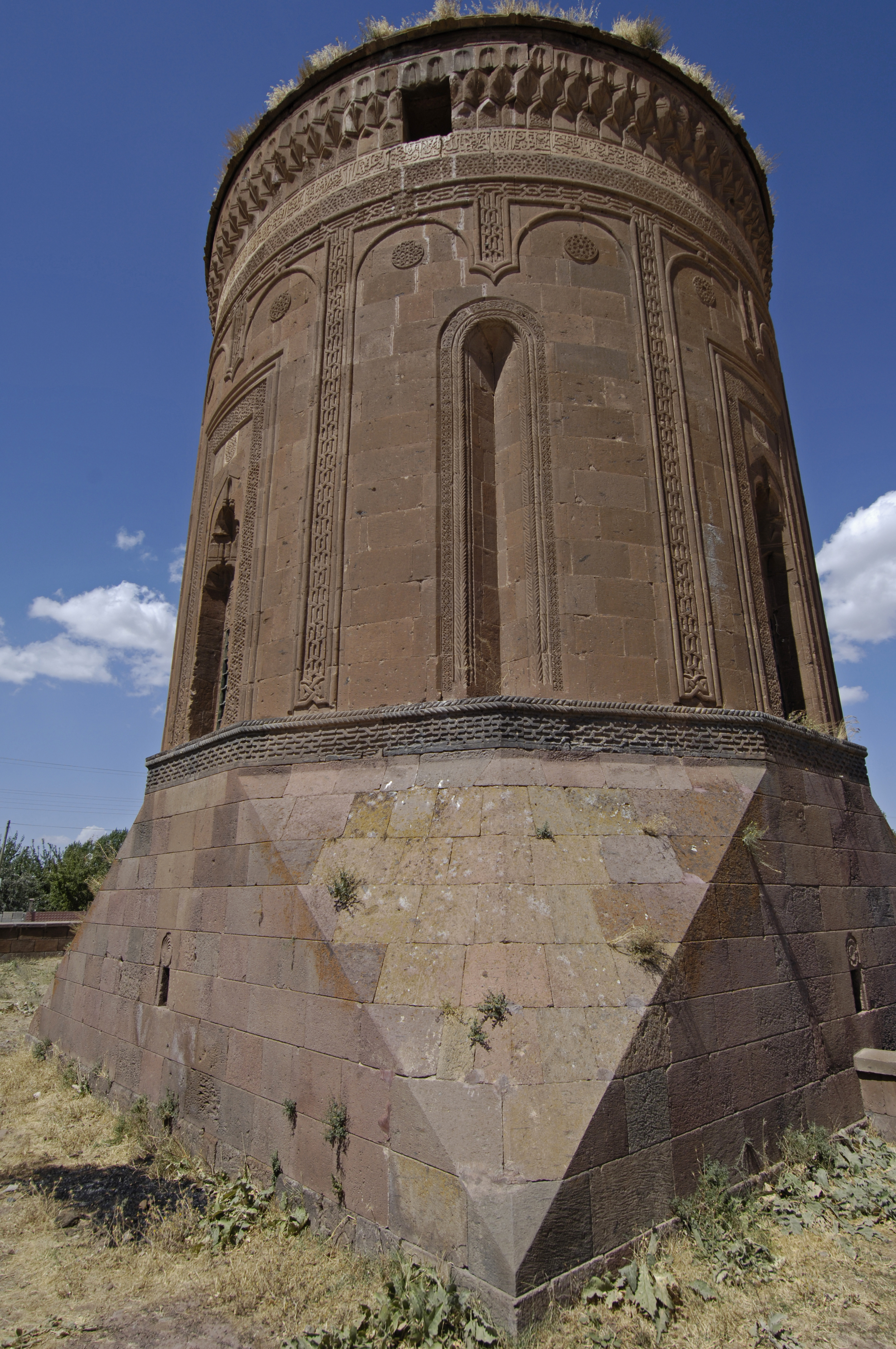
Ahlat Kümbet Ulu Kümbet

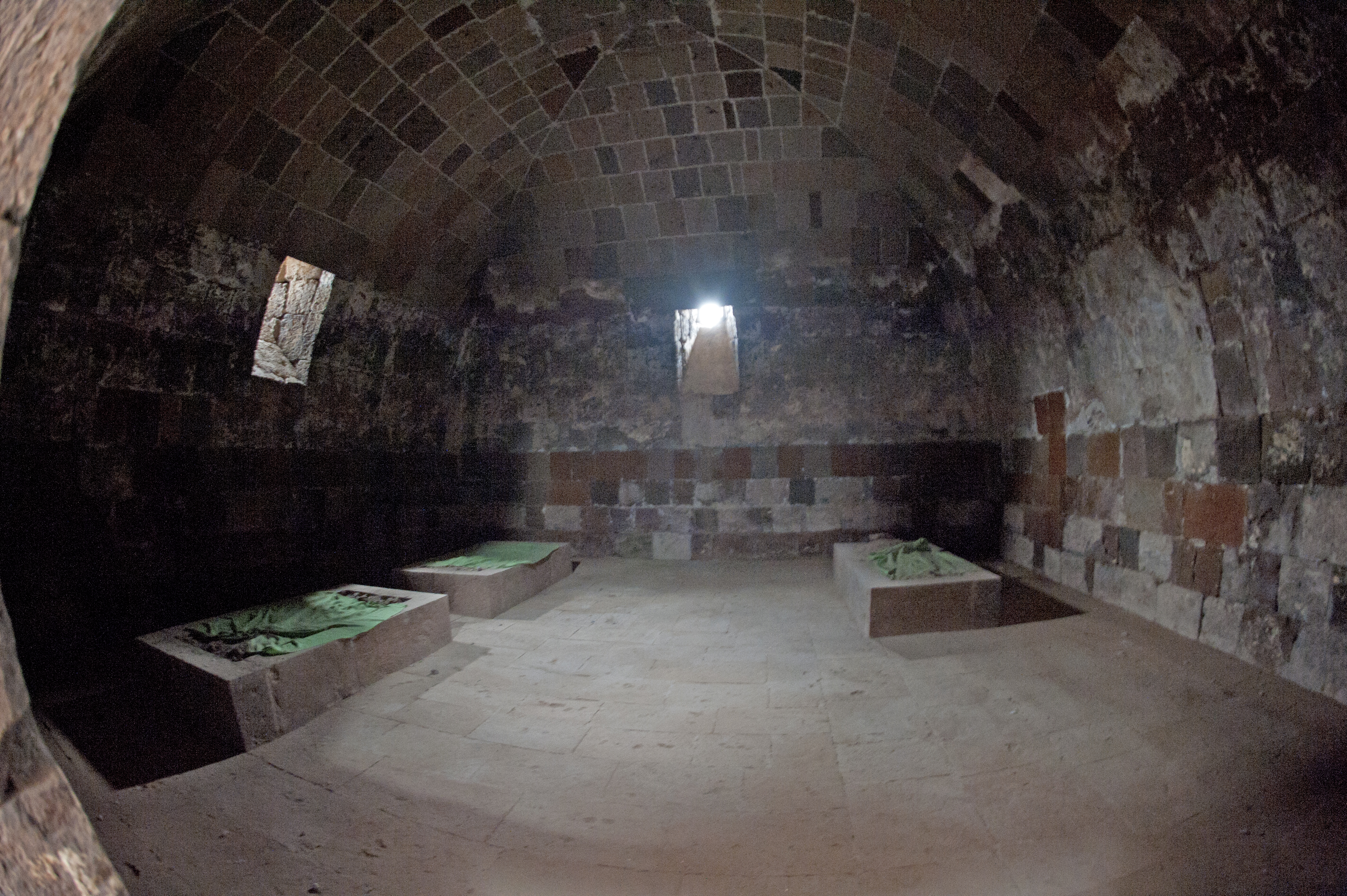
Ahlat Kümbet Interior

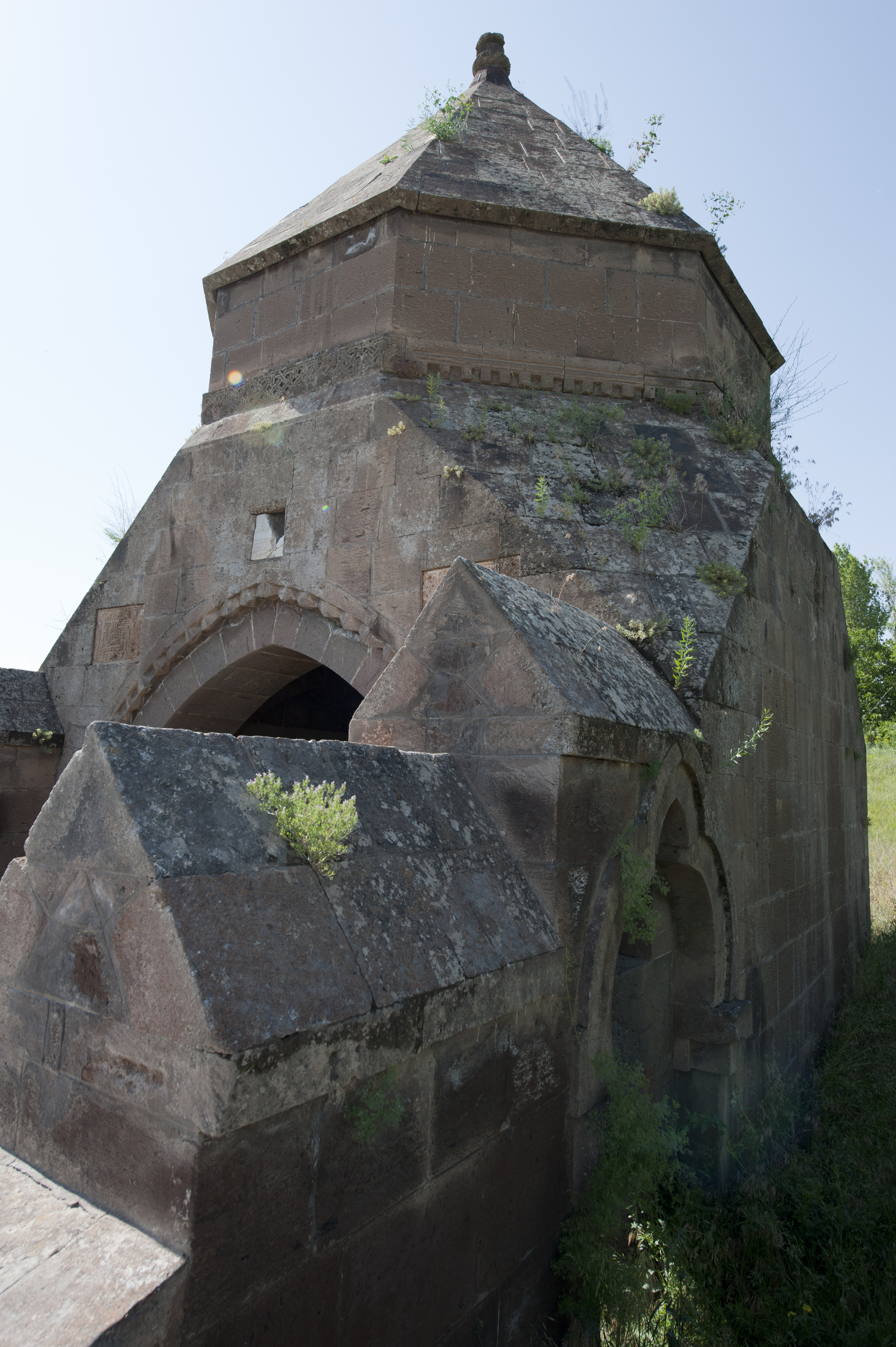
Ahlat Kümbet

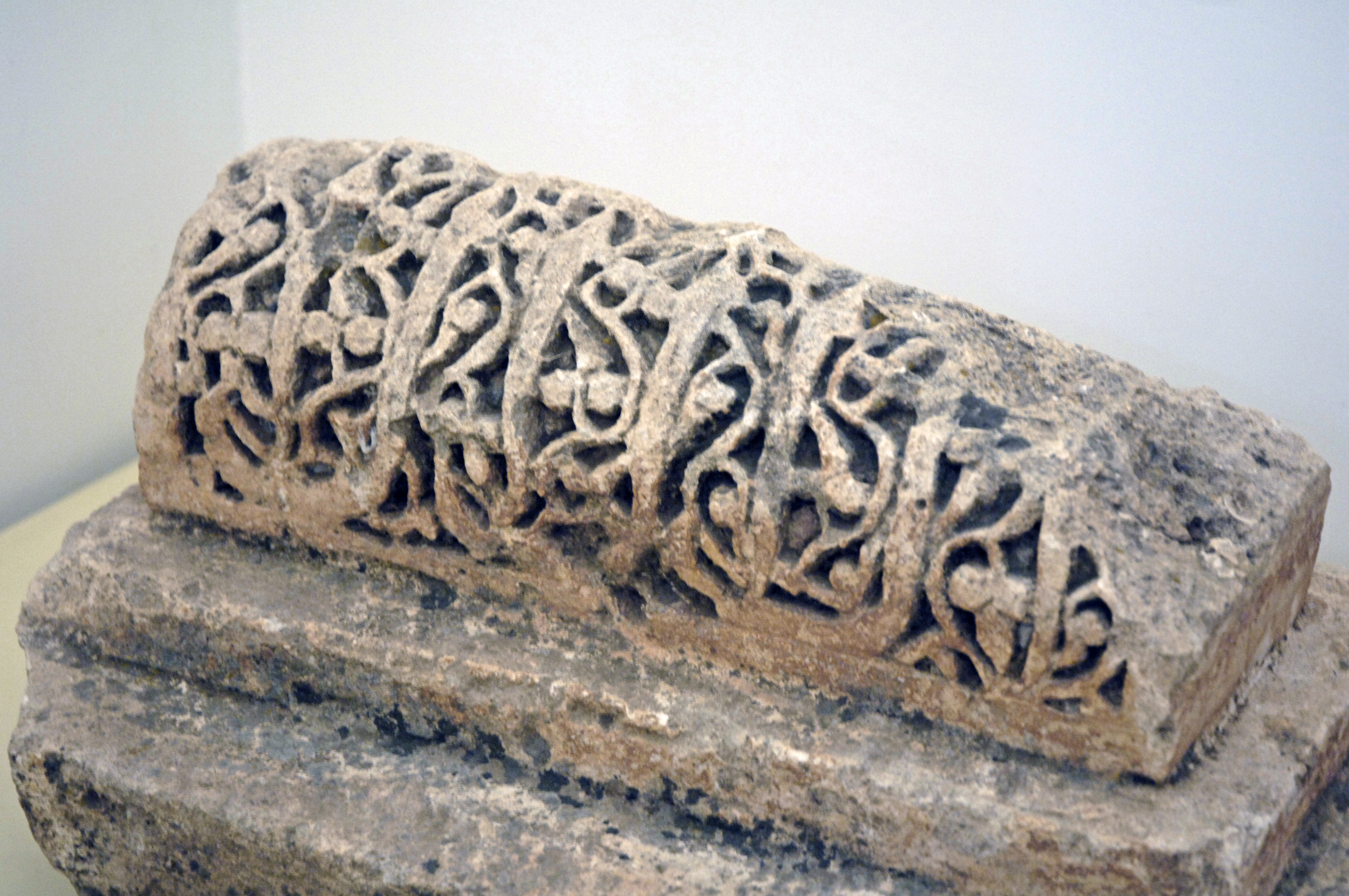
Ahlat Museum Catafalque

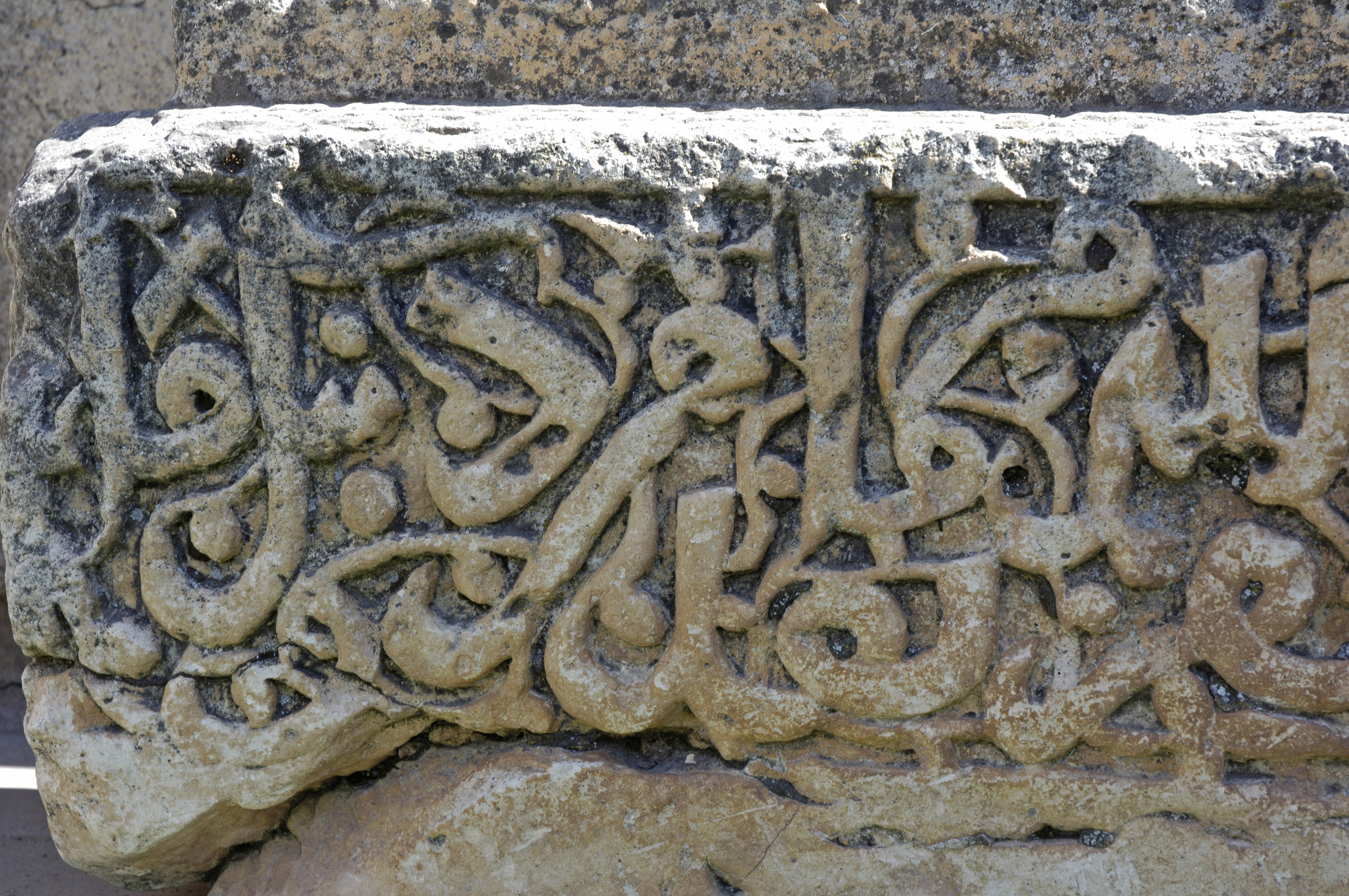
Ahlat Museum Script

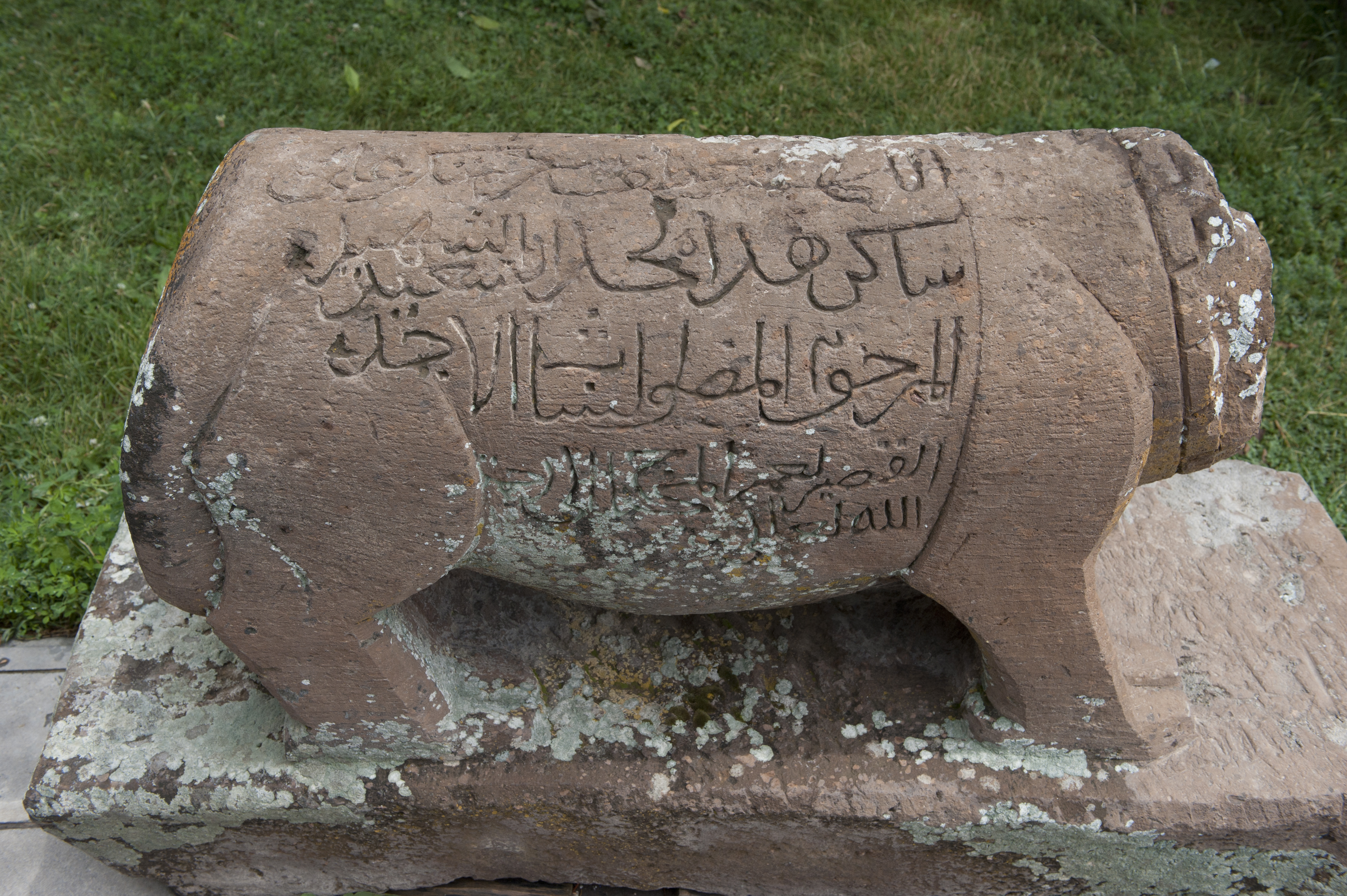
Ahlat Museum Animal with script

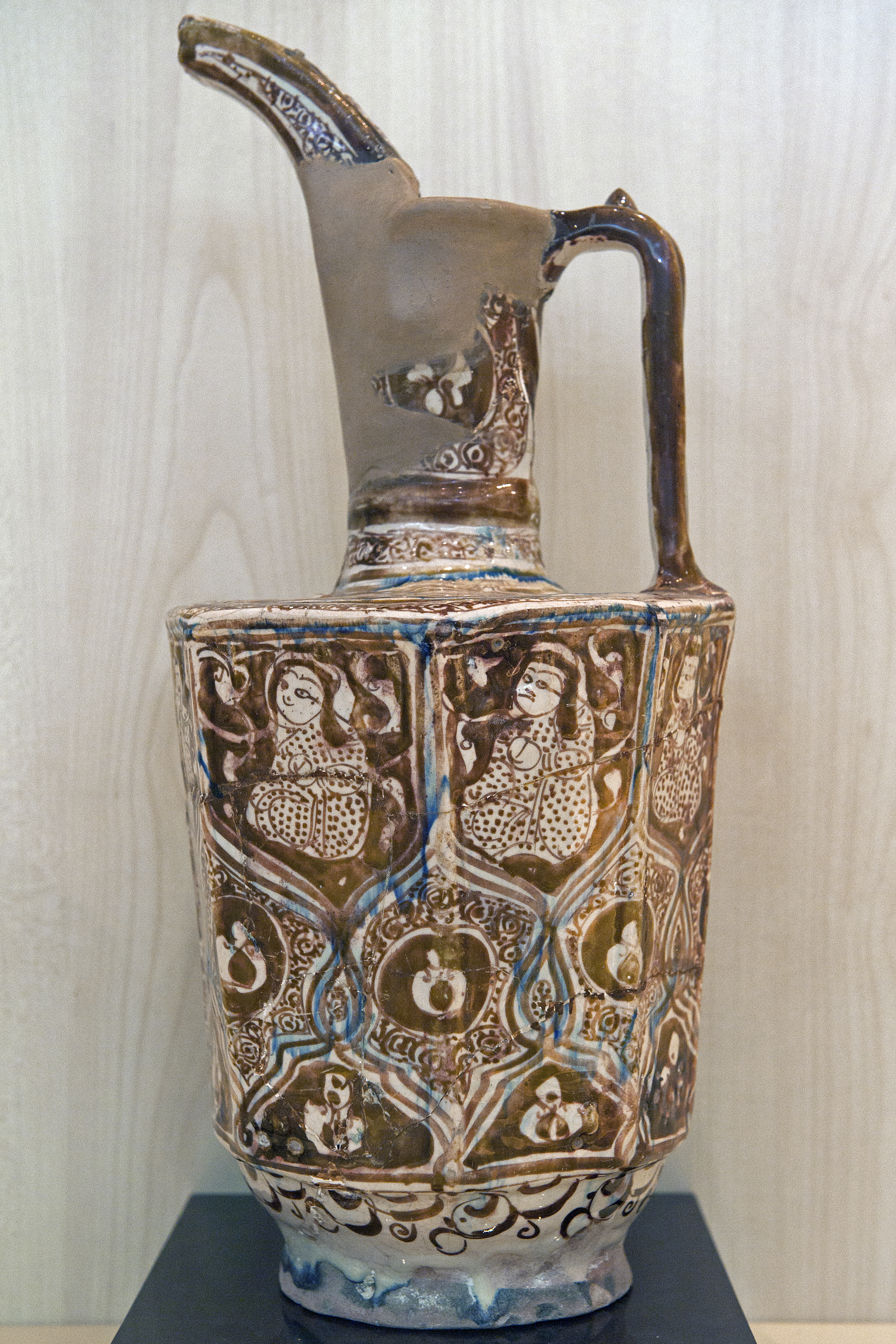
Ahlat Museum Water jug

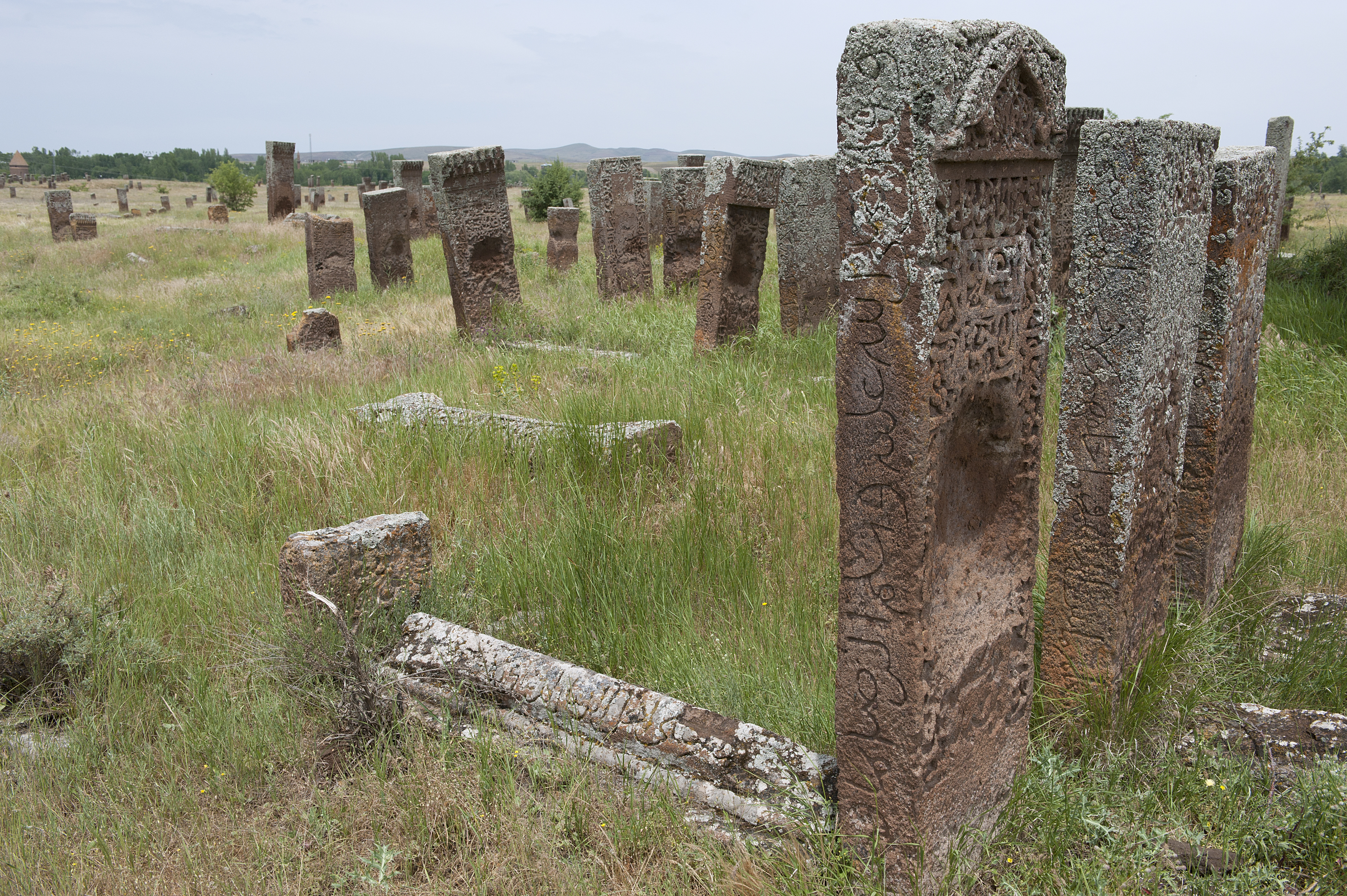
Ahlat Gravestones

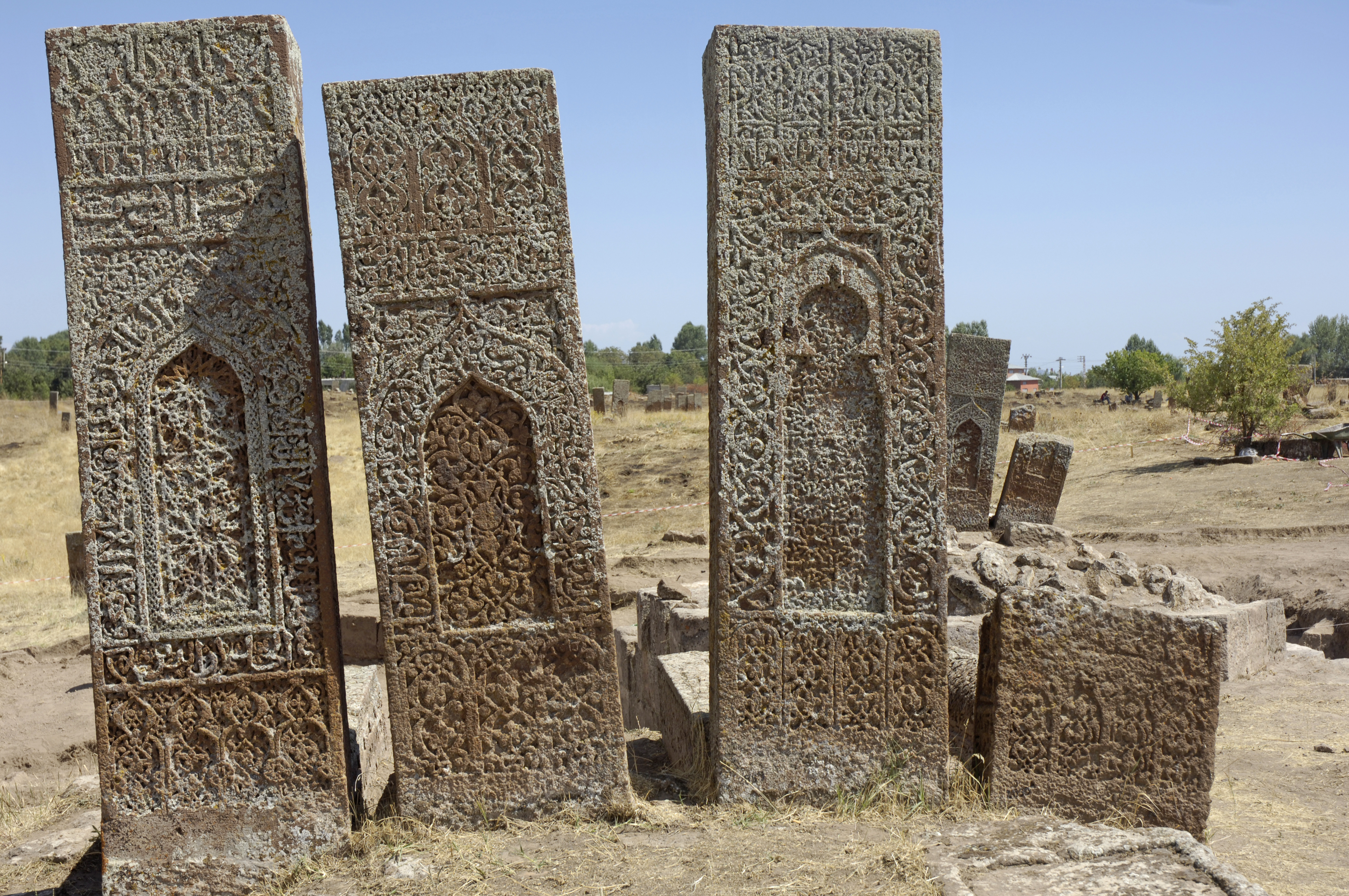
Ahlat Gravestones

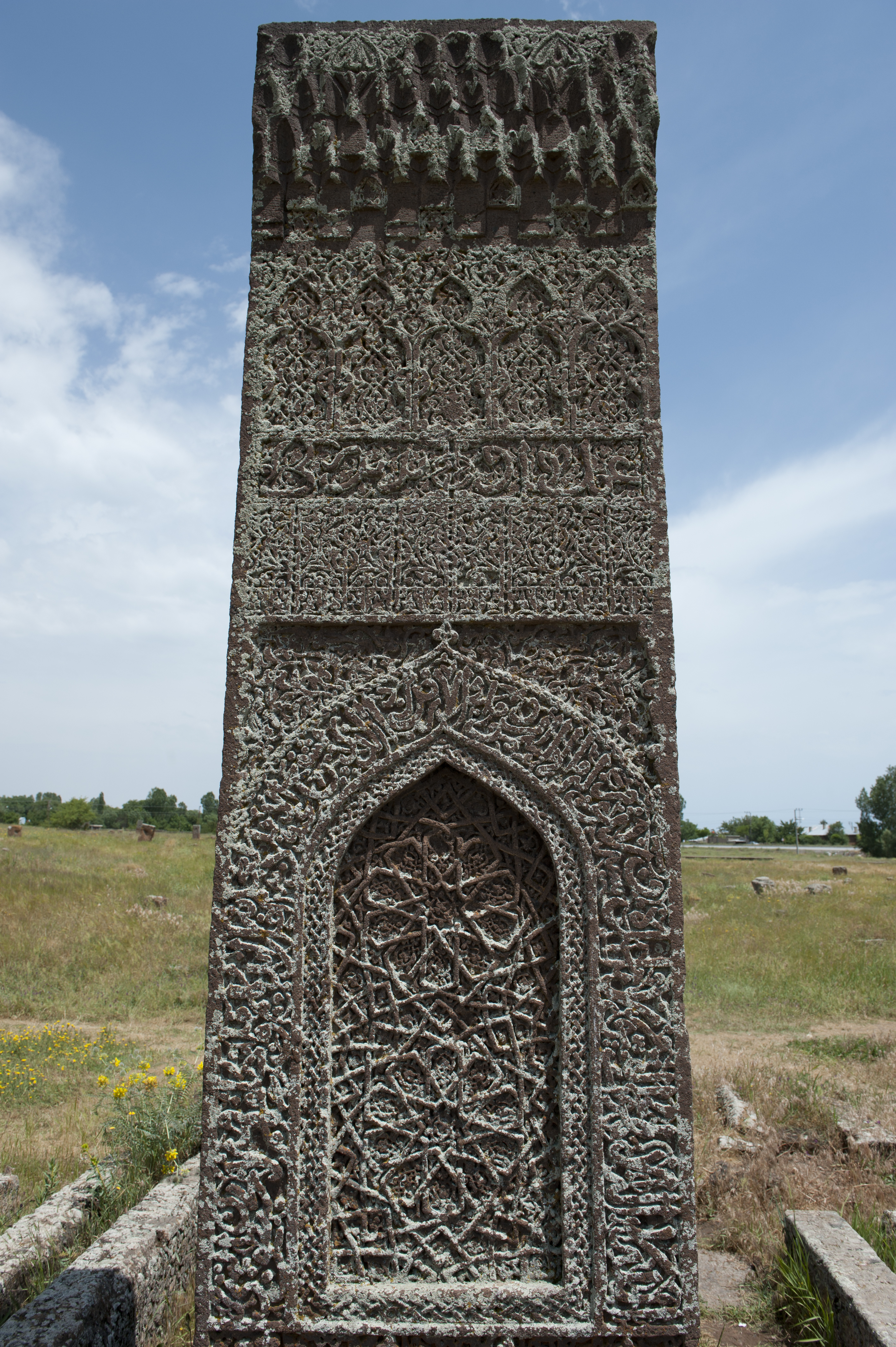
Ahlat Gravestone

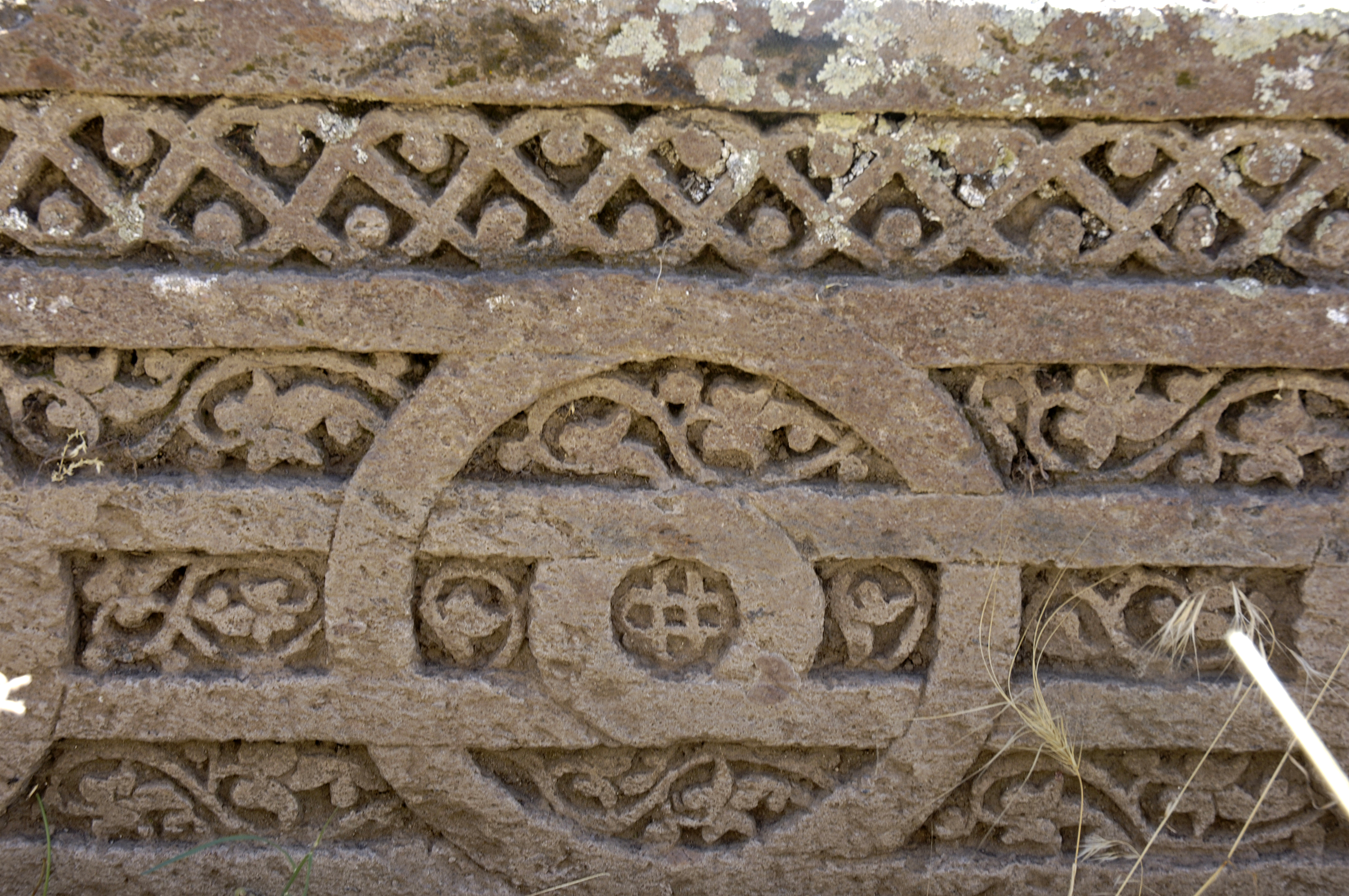
Ahlat gravestone Detail

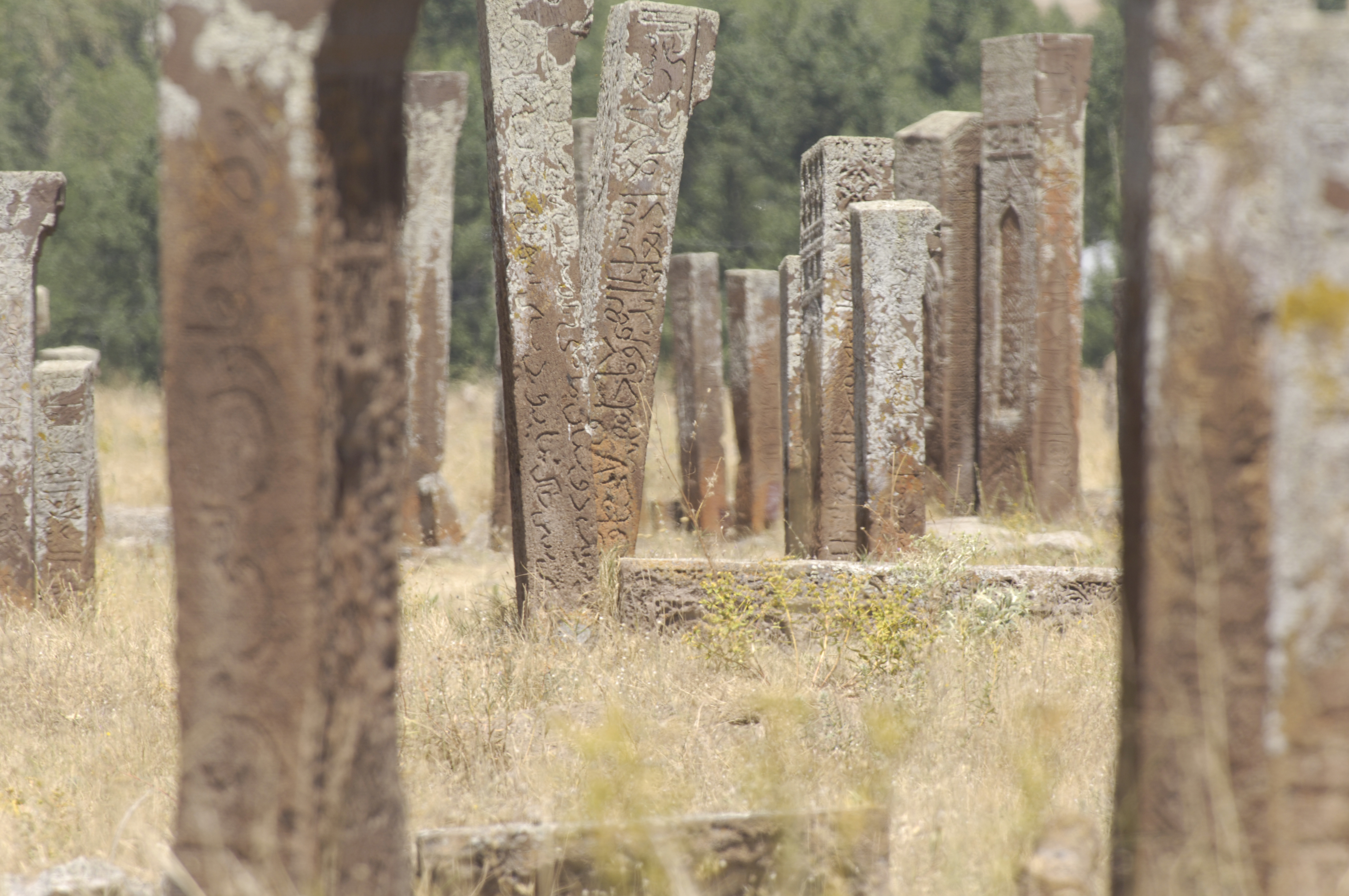
Ahlat Gravestone

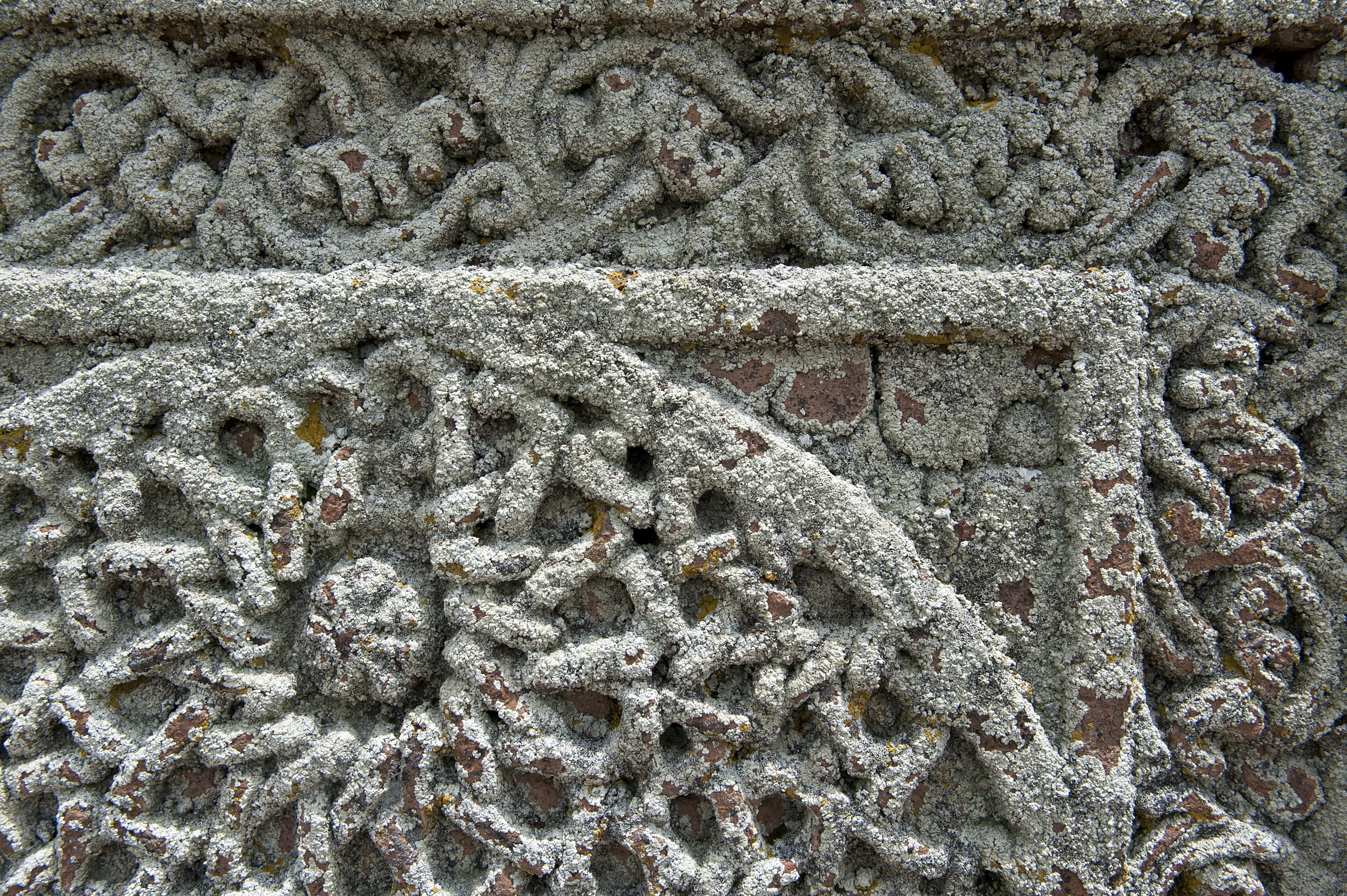
Ahlat Gravestone

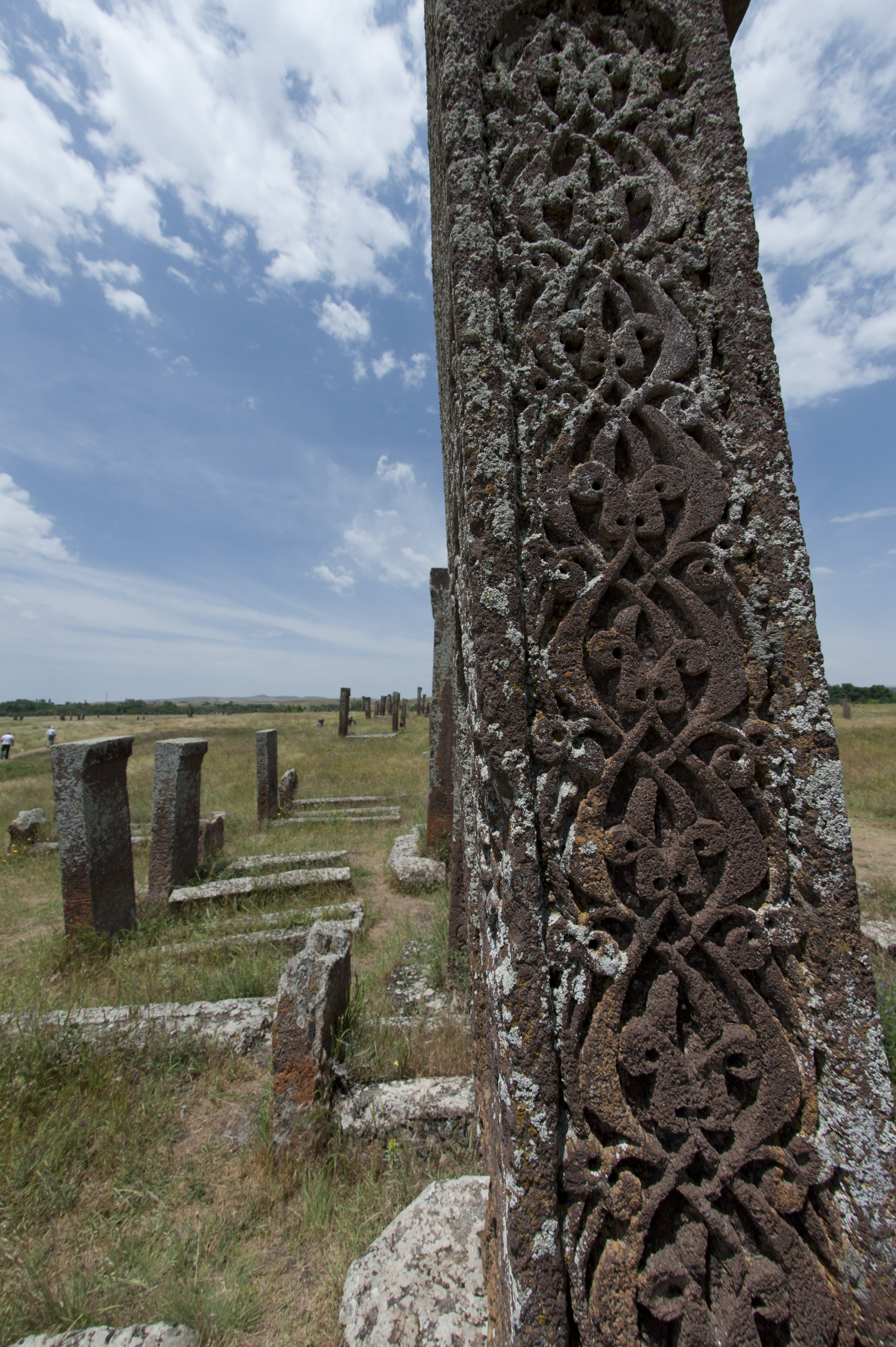
Ahlat Gravestone

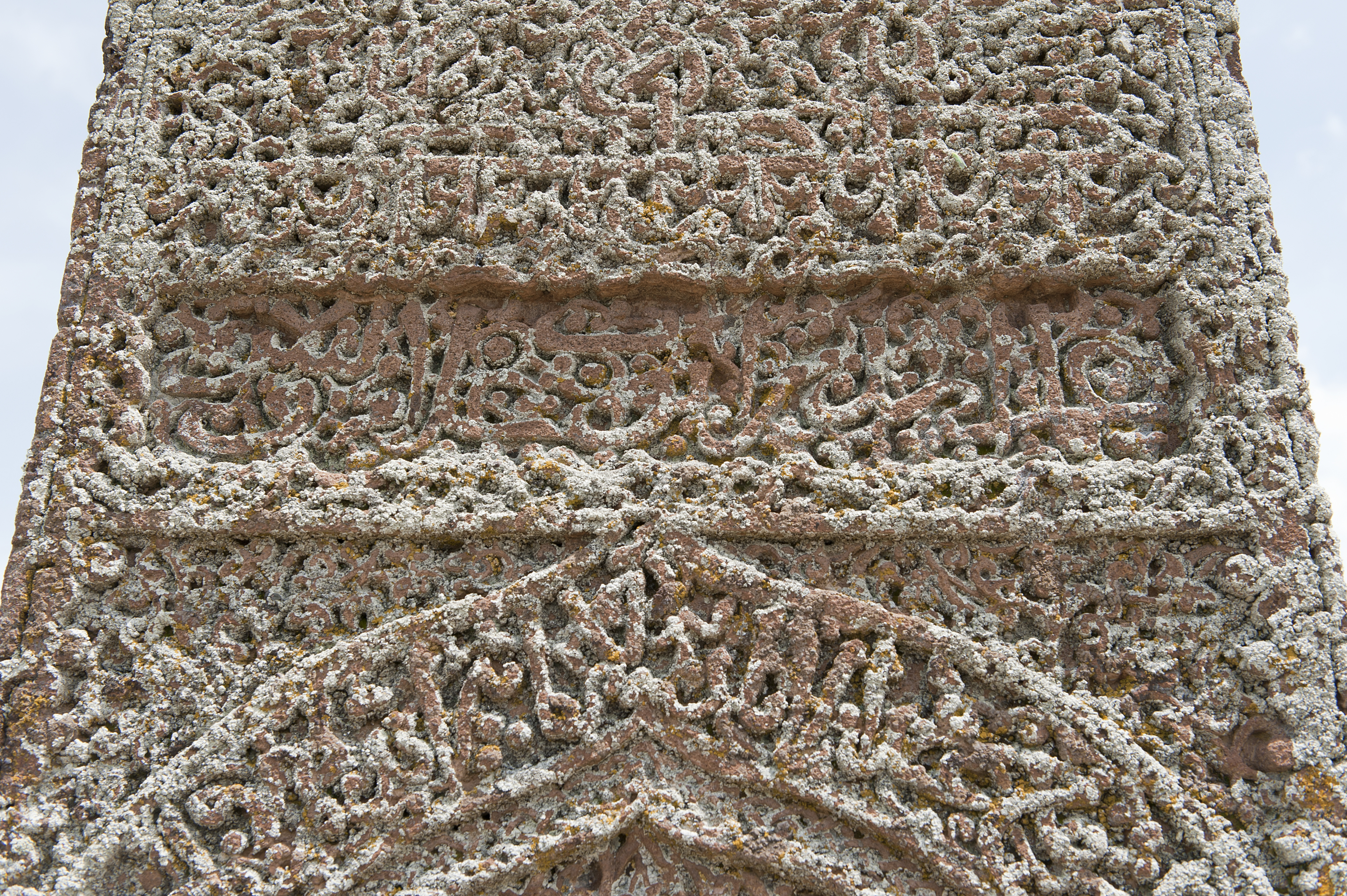
Ahlat Gravestone

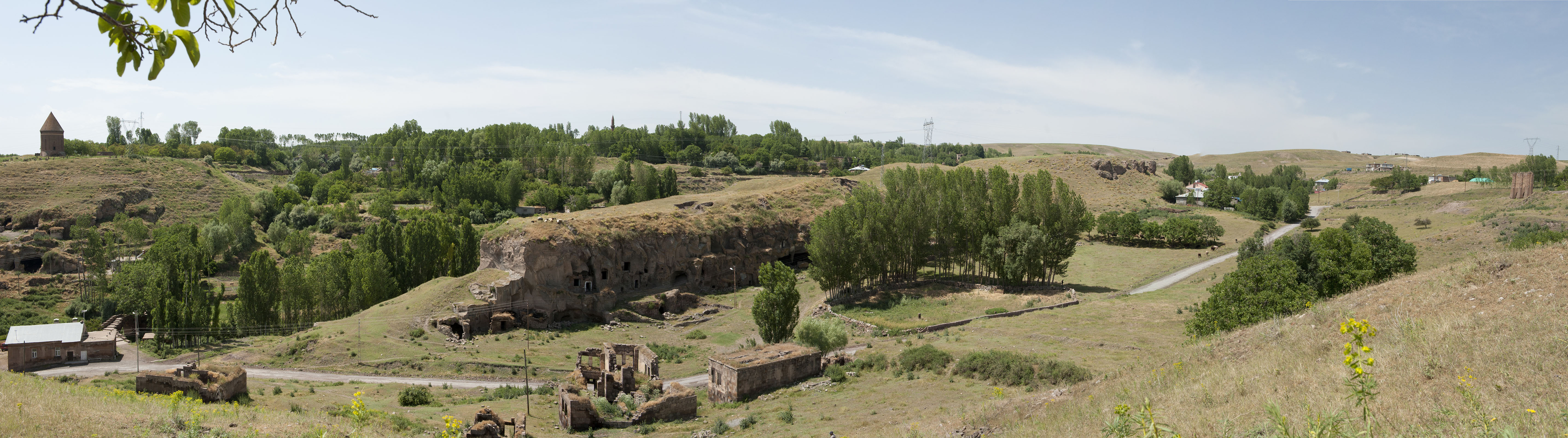
Ahlat Panorama

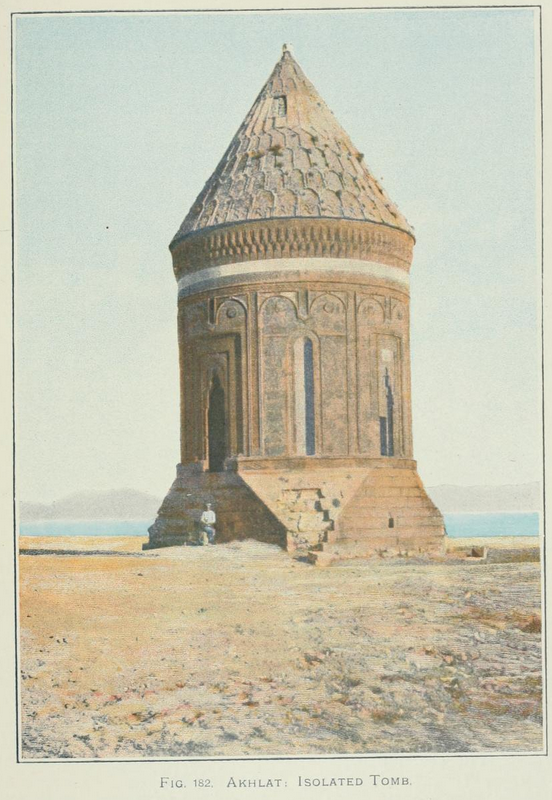
The tower of the medieval Muslim cemetery of Ulu Kümbet.

== Climate ==
Ahlat has a dry-summer humid continental climate (Köppen: Dsa), with very warm, dry summers and cold, snowy winters.

Climate data for Ahlat (1991–2020)
Month	Jan	Feb	Mar	Apr	May	Jun	Jul	Aug	Sep	Oct	Nov	Dec	Year
Mean daily maximum °C (°F)	1.4 (34.5)	2.0 (35.6)	5.8 (42.4)	11.5 (52.7)	17.4 (63.3)	23.8 (74.8)	28.3 (82.9)	28.9 (84.0)	24.1 (75.4)	17.0 (62.6)	9.3 (48.7)	3.7 (38.7)	14.5 (58.1)
Daily mean °C (°F)	−2.3 (27.9)	−1.9 (28.6)	1.8 (35.2)	7.1 (44.8)	12.3 (54.1)	17.9 (64.2)	22.1 (71.8)	22.5 (72.5)	17.7 (63.9)	11.6 (52.9)	4.8 (40.6)	0.0 (32.0)	9.5 (49.1)
Mean daily minimum °C (°F)	−5.6 (21.9)	−5.5 (22.1)	−1.9 (28.6)	3.0 (37.4)	7.3 (45.1)	11.6 (52.9)	15.4 (59.7)	16.0 (60.8)	11.6 (52.9)	6.9 (44.4)	1.1 (34.0)	−3.1 (26.4)	4.8 (40.6)
Average precipitation mm (inches)	40.05 (1.58)	44.99 (1.77)	60.27 (2.37)	81.94 (3.23)	59.47 (2.34)	19.11 (0.75)	5.79 (0.23)	3.5 (0.14)	13.45 (0.53)	52.75 (2.08)	54.6 (2.15)	46.86 (1.84)	482.78 (19.01)
Average precipitation days (≥ 1.0 mm)	6.9	7.8	9.6	10.8	9.3	3.2	1.9	1.6	2.3	7.0	6.5	7.1	74.0
Average relative humidity (%)	75.0	74.9	72.1	67.7	62.3	51.8	46.2	44.4	49.1	62.9	69.5	74.8	62.5
Source: NOAA

== Notable people ==
- Sayyid Husayn Ahlati (d. 1397), Kurdish occulist, lettrist and personal physician-alchemist to Sultan Barquq
- Şêx Şemsedînê Exlatî (1588–1674), Kurdish Sufi, poet and Sheikh

== See also ==
- Ahlatshahs
- Cave dwellings of Ahlat
- The Tombstones of Ahlat the Urartian and Ottoman citadel

== Sources ==
- Bosworth, C.E.; Crane, H. (1984). "AḴLĀṬ". In Yarshater, Ehsan (ed.). Encyclopædia Iranica. Vol. I/7: Ahriman–Alafrank. London and New York: Routledge & Kegan Paul. pp. 725–727. ISBN 978-0-71009-096-6.
- Boyar, Ebru (2013). "Ottoman expansion in the East". In Faroqhi, Suraiya N.; Fleet, Kate (eds.). The Cambridge History of Turkey: Volume 2, The Ottoman Empire as a World Power, 1453–1603. Cambridge University Press. ISBN 978-0-521-62094-9.
- Floor, Willem M. (2008). Titles and Emoluments in Safavid Iran: A Third Manual of Safavid Administration, by Mirza Naqi Nasiri. Washington, DC: Mage Publishers. ISBN 978-1933823232.
- Ozoglu, Hakan (2012), Kurdish Notables and the Ottoman State: Evolving Identities, Competing Loyalties, and Shifting Boundaries, State University of New York Press, ISBN 9780791485569
- Lecker, Michael (2016). "Ḥabīb b. Maslama al-Fihrī". In Fleet, Kate; Krämer, Gudrun; Matringe, Denis; Nawas, John; Rowson, Everett (eds.). Encyclopaedia of Islam (3rd ed.). Brill Online. ISSN 1873-9830.
- Üngör, Ugur Ümit (March 2012), The Making of Modern Turkey: Nation and State in Eastern Anatolia, 1913-1950, OUP Oxford, ISBN 9780199655229
- "Аклат". Brockhaus and Efron Encyclopedic Dictionary: In 86 Volumes (82 Volumes and 4 Additional Volumes) (in Russian). St. Petersburg: F. A. Brockhaus. 1890–1907.
