= Athletics at the 1960 Summer Olympics – Men's long jump =

Men's long jump at the Games of the XVII Olympiad
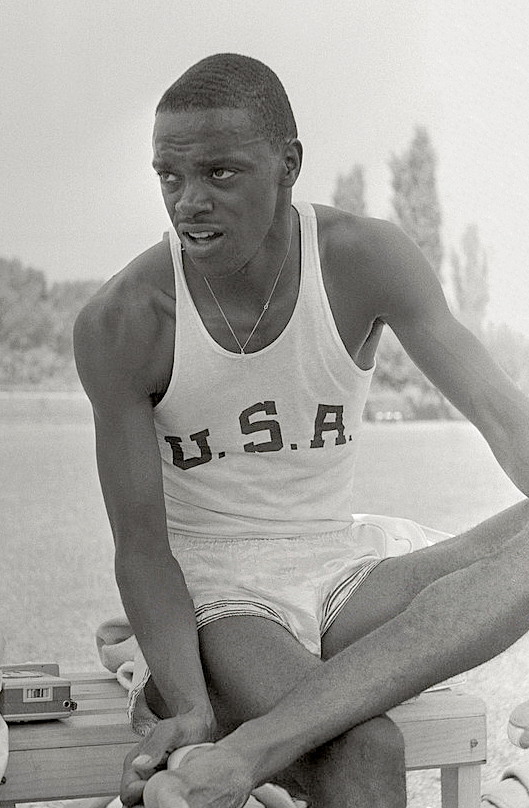
- Ralph Boston
- Venue: Olympic Stadium
- Date: September 2, 1960
- Competitors: 49 from 34 nations
- Winning distance: 8.12 OR

Medalists
1st place, gold medalist(s)		Ralph Boston; United States
2nd place, silver medalist(s)		Bo Roberson; United States
3rd place, bronze medalist(s)		Igor Ter-Ovanesyan; Soviet Union

The men's long jump field event at the 1960 Olympic Games took place on September 2. Forty-nine athletes from 34 nations competed. The maximum number of athletes per nation had been set at 3 since the 1930 Olympic Congress. The event was won by 1 cm by Ralph Boston of the United States, the nation's eighth consecutive and 13th overall victory in the men's long jump. Igor Ter-Ovanesyan's bronze was the Soviet Union's first medal in the event.

== Background ==
This was the 14th appearance of the event, which is one of 12 athletics events to have been held at every Summer Olympics. The returning finalists from the 1956 Games were bronze medalist Jorma Valkama of Finland, fourth-place finisher Dmitriy Bondarenko of the Soviet Union, sixth-place finisher Kazimierz Kropidłowski of Poland, twelfth-place finisher Fermín Donazar of Uruguay, and Igor Ter-Ovanesyan of the Soviet Union, who had fouled in all three attempts in the 1956 final. Ralph Boston of the United States was favored; the month before the Games he had broken the 25-year-old world record set by Jesse Owens. Ter-Ovanesyan, the 1958 European champion, was his biggest challenger.

The British West Indies, Egypt, Iraq, Malaya, and New Zealand each made their first appearance in the event; Germany competed as the "United Team of Germany" for the first time. The United States appeared for the 14th time, the only nation to have long jumpers at each of the Games thus far.

== Competition format ==
The 1960 competition used the two-round format with divided final introduced in 1952. The qualifying round gave each competitor three jumps to achieve a distance of 7.40 metres; if fewer than 12 men did so, the top 12 (including all those tied) would advance. The final provided each jumper with three jumps; the top six jumpers received an additional three jumps for a total of six, with the best to count (qualifying round jumps were not considered for the final).

== Records ==
Prior to this competition, the existing world and Olympic records were as follows.

World record	Ralph Boston (USA)	8.21	Walnut, United States	12 August 1960
Olympic record	Jesse Owens (USA)	8.06	Berlin, Germany	4 August 1936

Ralph Boston broke the Olympic record with an 8.12 metre jump on his third attempt in the final. In his last jump, Bo Roberson also surpassed the old Olympic record but did not quite reach Boston's new record, jumping 8.11 metres.

== Schedule ==
All times are Central European Time (UTC+1)

Date	Time	Round
Friday, 2 September 1960	9:00; 16:20	Qualifying; Final

== Results ==
All jumpers reaching 7.40 metres advanced to the finals. All distances are listen in metres.

=== Qualifying ===
Rank	Athlete	Nation	1	2	3	Distance	Notes
1	Bo Roberson	United States	7.81	—	—	7.81	Q
2	Igor Ter-Ovanesyan	Soviet Union	7.79	—	—	7.79	Q
3	Henk Visser	Netherlands	7.29	7.72	—	7.72	Q
4	Manfred Steinbach	United Team of Germany	X	7.70	—	7.70	Q
5	Jorma Valkama	Finland	7.63	—	—	7.63	Q
6	Ralph Boston	United States	7.60	—	—	7.60	Q
7	Takayuki Okazaki	Japan	7.58	—	—	7.58	Q
8	Attilio Bravi	Italy	7.57	—	—	7.57	Q
9	Dmytro Bondarenko	Soviet Union	7.24	7.33	7.49	7.49	Q
10	Manfred Molzberger	United Team of Germany	7.21	7.46	—	7.46	Q
11	Dimos Manglaras	Greece	7.35	7.25	7.45	7.45	Q
12	Fred Alsop	Great Britain	X	6.93	7.42	7.42	Q
13	Paul Foreman	British West Indies	X	7.42	—	7.42	Q
14	Christian Collardot	France	7.32	7.40	—	7.40	Q
15	John Oladipo Oladitan	Nigeria	7.33	7.29	7.38	7.38	
16	Kazimierz Kropidłowski	Poland	X	7.37	X	7.37	
17	Yukishige Yasuma	Japan	7.34	X	7.26	7.34	
18	Juhani Manninen	Finland	7.34	7.21	6.49	7.34	
19	Fritz Köppen	United Team of Germany	X	7.32	7.09	7.32	
20	Anthony Watson	United States	6.95	X	7.32	7.32	
21	Gustav Schlosser	Switzerland	7.26	7.27	X	7.27	
22	Jan Netopilík	Czechoslovakia	7.06	X	7.26	7.26	
23	Fermín Donazar	Uruguay	7.09	7.24	7.14	7.24	
24	Roberto Procel	Mexico	X	7.13	7.23	7.23	
25	David Kushnir	Israel	7.16	7.20	7.12	7.20	
26	Ali Brakchi	France	7.20	7.09	6.89	7.20	
27	John Howell	Great Britain	7.19	X	X	7.19	
28	Pedro de Almeida	Portugal	7.10	X	7.09	7.10	
29	Roar Berthelsen	Norway	6.72	6.95	7.09	7.09	
30	B. V. Satyanarayan	India	6.95	7.08	X	7.08	
31	Luis Felipe Areta	Spain	7.04	X	7.04	7.04	
32	Dave Norris	New Zealand	6.91	7.02	7.04	7.04	
33	Ian Tomlinson	Australia	7.03	X	X	7.03	
34	Seo Yeong-Ju	South Korea	6.78	6.98	X	6.98	
35	Yalçın Ünsal	Turkey	6.97	6.58	6.58	6.97	
36	John Baguley	Australia	6.84	X	6.96	6.96	
37	Mahmoud Atter Abdel Fattah	Egypt	6.72	6.94	X	6.94	
38	Romain Poté	Belgium	6.81	6.69	6.92	6.92	
39	Jun Ebina	Japan	6.68	6.83	6.58	6.83	
40	Revaz Kvachakidze	Soviet Union	5.42	6.82	X	6.82	
41	Prajim Wongsuwan	Thailand	6.78	X	X	6.78	
42	Vilhjálmur Einarsson	Iceland	6.76	6.64	—	6.76	
43	Kaimar-ud-Din bin Maidin	Malaya	6.74	5.84	5.38	6.74	
44	Virsa Singh	India	6.60	6.70	6.68	6.70	
45	Bevyn Baker	Australia	X	X	6.43	6.43	
46	A. Abdul Razzak	Iraq	X	6.37	6.37	6.37	
—	Clive Bonas	Venezuela	X	X	X	No mark	
—	Luigi Ulivelli	Italy	X	X	X	No mark	
—	Muhammad Ramzan Ali	Pakistan	X	X	X	No mark	
—	José da Conceição	Brazil	DNS				
—	Henryk Grabowski	Poland	DNS				
—	Rouhollah Rahmani	Iran	DNS				
—	Iftikhar Shah	Pakistan	DNS				
—	Torgny Wåhlander	Sweden	DNS				
—	Ali Zaid	Afghanistan	DNS				

=== Final ===
Rank	Athlete	Nation	1	2	3	4	5	6	Distance
1st place, gold medalist(s)	Ralph Boston	United States	7.82	X	8.12 OR	7.80	X	7.96	8.12
2nd place, silver medalist(s)	Bo Roberson	United States	X	8.03	7.88	7.75	7.62	8.11	8.11
3rd place, bronze medalist(s)	Igor Ter-Ovanesyan	Soviet Union	7.90	7.80	X	X	7.68	8.04	8.04
4	Manfred Steinbach	United Team of Germany	7.81	X	7.76	X	X	8.00	8.00
5	Jorma Valkama	Finland	7.52	7.69	7.36	7.31	X	7.29	7.69
6	Christian Collardot	France	7.67	X	7.68	6.96	7.50	X	7.68
7	Henk Visser	Netherlands	7.59	7.43	7.66	Did not advance			7.66
8	Dmytro Bondarenko	Soviet Union	7.27	7.58	7.37	Did not advance			7.58
9	Manfred Molzberger	United Team of Germany	7.35	7.49	7.47	Did not advance			7.49
10	Attilio Bravi	Italy	7.30	7.22	7.47	Did not advance			7.47
11	Dimos Manglaras	Greece	7.16	7.32	7.45	Did not advance			7.45
12	Paul Foreman	British West Indies	7.26	—	—	Did not advance			7.26
13	Fred Alsop	Great Britain	7.25	7.18	7.16	Did not advance			7.25
—	Takayuki Okazaki	Japan	DNS						
