= Deaths in December 2006 =

The following is a list of notable deaths in December 2006.

Entries for each day are listed alphabetically by surname. A typical entry lists information in the following sequence:

- Name, age, country of citizenship at birth, subsequent country of citizenship (if applicable), reason for notability, cause of death (if known), and reference.

== December 2006 ==
=== 1 ===
- Claude Jade, 58, French actress (Baisers Volés, L'Amour en Fuite, Topaz), metastatic eye cancer.
- Herbert Gursky, 76, American astrophysicist for the Naval Research Laboratory, stomach cancer.
- Geoffrey Colin Guy, 86, British airman and colonial governor.
- Sid Raymond, 97, American voice actor (Baby Huey), complications of a stroke.
- Ali Khan Samsudin, 48, Malaysian "snake king", venomous snakebite.

=== 2 ===
- Bob Berry, 80, British test cricket player, natural causes.
- Corinne Clark, 83, American baseball player (Peoria Redwings).
- kari edwards, 52, American poet, artist and gender activist, heart failure.
- Ralf Ginsborg, 79, Danish footballer and Olympian (1952).
- Kurt Lipstein, 97, German-born legal scholar.
- Sig Sigurdson, 88, American football player (Baltimore Colts).
- Mariska Veres, 59, Dutch singer for Shocking Blue (Venus), cancer.

=== 3 ===
- Raili Halttu, 97, Finnish Olympic sprinter (1936).
- Craig Hinton, 42, British science fiction author, heart attack.
- Billy Klaus, 77, American baseball player (Boston Red Sox, Baltimore Orioles, Philadelphia Phillies).
- Ferenc Machos, 74, Hungarian soccer player.
- Ernie Oravetz, 74, American baseball player (Washington Senators).
- Logan Whitehurst, 29, American singer and songwriter (The Velvet Teen), brain cancer.

=== 4 ===
- Sir Peter Gadsden, 77, British Lord Mayor of London (1979–1980).
- Joseph Ki-Zerbo, 84, Burkinabé politician, natural causes.
- James Kim, 35, American CNET editor, exposure and hypothermia.
- Ross A. McGinnis, 19, United States Army soldier, killed in action.
- Rodney Needham, 83, British social anthropologist.
- Len Sutton, 81, American Indianapolis 500 racing driver, cancer.
- Adam Williams, 82, American actor (North by Northwest, The Big Heat, Fear Strikes Out), lymphoma.

=== 5 ===
- Yuri Baulin, 73, Soviet Russian ice hockey player and Olympian (1960).
- David Bronstein, 82, Ukrainian chess grandmaster and writer, champion of USSR, natural causes.
- Otto Brown, 59, American football player (Dallas Cowboys, New York Giants).
- Eric Cox, 83, Australian rugby league player, referee and administrator, pneumonia and stroke.
- Maria da Conceição Gayer, 57, Brazilian lawyer and politician, heart attack.
- Michael Gilden, 44, American actor (NCIS, Return of the Jedi, Pulp Fiction), suicide by hanging.
- Gerry Humphreys, 75, Welsh sound engineer (Gandhi, A Chorus Line, Blade Runner).
- Keisuke Ito, 63, Japanese swimmer and Olympian (1964).
- Gernot Jurtin, 51, Austrian football player, cancer.
- Timothy Moxon, 82, British actor and entrepreneur.
- Van Smith, 61, American costume and makeup designer (Pink Flamingos, Hairspray, Cry-Baby), heart attack.

=== 6 ===
- Han Ahmedow, 70, Turkmen Prime Minister (1989–1992), heart attack.
- Darren Brown, 44, British musician and lead singer (Mega City Four), stroke.
- Russell Buchanan, 106, American World War I veteran, stroke.
- Hugo Cores, 69, Uruguayan historian, labor leader and politician, Deputy (1990–1994), stroke.
- Samuel Devons, 92, British physicist and science historian at Columbia University, heart failure.
- Andra Franklin, 47, American football player (Miami Dolphins), heart failure.
- Karl McDade, 91, American football player (Pittsburgh Pirates).
- Mavis Pugh, 92, British actress (You Rang, M'Lord?), natural causes.
- Tone Razinger, 85, Slovenian Olympic cross-country skier (1948).
- Robert Rosenblum, 79, American art historian, curator, and author, colon cancer.
- William Salcer, 82, Czechoslovak-born American inventor and Holocaust survivor, leukemia.

=== 7 ===
- Lyuben Berov, 81, Bulgarian prime minister (1992–1994), cancer.
- Kevin Berry, 61, Australian swimmer and Olympian (1960, 1964), brain tumour.
- Desmond Briscoe, 81, British sound engineer and founder of the BBC Radiophonic Workshop, natural causes.
- Moses Hardy, 112, American supercentenarian, oldest known American man, last African American World War I veteran, natural causes.
- Johnnie Bryan Hunt, 79, American trucking executive, founder of J.B. Hunt Transport Services, head injuries from a fall.
- Kim Hyung-chil, 47, South Korean equestrian at the 2006 Asian Games and Olympian (1988), crushed by falling horse.
- Jeane Kirkpatrick, 80, American United Nations ambassador (1981–1985), heart failure.
- Jay McShann, 90, American blues and swing pianist, bandleader and singer, natural causes.
- Billy Mixon, 77, American football player (Georgia Bulldogs, San Francisco 49ers).
- Chris Nelson, 46, American photographer, heart attack.
- Gurnam Singh, 75, Indonesian athlete.

=== 8 ===
- William H. Briare, 76, American politician, Mayor of Las Vegas (1975–1987).
- Sir Colin Figures, 81, British head of the Secret Intelligence Service (1982–1985), natural causes.
- Sixten Jansson, 93, Swedish Olympic canoeist (1936).
- Martha Tilton, 91, American jazz and swing singer.
- Philip Tower, 89, British army general.
- José Uribe, 47, Dominican baseball player (San Francisco Giants, St. Louis Cardinals, Houston Astros), traffic collision.

=== 9 ===
- Koula Agagiotou, 91, Greek actress (To Retire), natural causes.
- Peter Derow, 62, American classical scholar, heart attack.
- Georgia Gibbs, 87, American singer ("Kiss of Fire") known for her work on Your Hit Parade, leukemia.
- Ralph Gomberg, 85, American principal oboist at the Boston Symphony, primary lateral sclerosis.
- Ernesto Gutiérrez, 79, Argentine footballer.
- Andrei Lomakin, 42, Russian ice hockey player (Philadelphia Flyers, Florida Panthers), and Olympian (1988), long illness (cancer).
- Martin Nodell, 91, American comic book and advertising artist, creator of the Golden Age Green Lantern, natural causes.
- Tremayne Rodd, 3rd Baron Rennell, 71, British rugby union player for Scotland, cancer.
- Dale Schofield, 91, American Olympic hurdler (1936).
- Mildred Warwick, 84, American baseball player.

=== 10 ===
- Kenneth Cummins, 106, British veteran of the First World War, natural causes.
- Mario Llerena, 93, Cuban intellectual, author and former Castro supporter turned critic, natural causes.
- Luigi Ornaghi, 75, Italian actor and farmer
- Salvatore Pappalardo, 88, Italian Archbishop of Palermo (1970–1996), natural causes.
- Augusto Pinochet, 91, Chilean president (1973–1990), complications from heart attack.
- David Wood, 43, American environmental campaigner.

=== 11 ===
- Elizabeth Bolden, 116, American oldest verified person in the world (2006), natural causes.
- Tom Gregory, 79, American television news anchor and announcer, heart disease.
- Jiří Hanke, 81, Czech footballer.
- Homer Ledford, 79, American bluegrass musician, guitar, complications from amyotrophic lateral sclerosis and a stroke.
- Lo Tak-shing, 71, Hong Kong politician, heart attack.
- Colin Mair, 86, British rector of Kelvinside Academy.
- Walter Ward, 66, American lead singer of The Olympics, unspecified illness.

=== 12 ===
- İsfendiyar Açıksöz, 77, Turkish footballer and manager.
- Paul Arizin, 78, American basketball player (Philadelphia Warriors).
- Heinz Beck, 78, German footballer.
- Peter Boyle, 71, American actor (Young Frankenstein, Everybody Loves Raymond, Taxi Driver), Emmy winner (1996), multiple myeloma.
- Bob Copp, 88, Canadian ice hockey player (Toronto Maple Leafs).
- Kenny Davern, 71, American jazz clarinetist, heart attack.
- Irv Hall, 88, American baseball player (Philadelphia Athletics).
- Cor van der Hart, 78, Dutch footballer.
- Oscar Klein, 76, Austrian-born American jazz trumpeter, heart attack.
- Antoine Raab, 93, German association footballer and anti-fascist.
- Eliyathamby Ratnasabapathy, 68, Sri Lankan Tamil militant civil war leader, long illness.
- Alda Risma, 24, Indonesian vocalist and actress, overdose.
- Ellis Rubin, 81, American attorney and author, cancer.
- Celal Sandal, 65, Turkish footballer and Olympian (1968).
- Raymond P. Shafer, 89, American Governor of Pennsylvania (1967–1971), complications from heart failure.
- Alan Shugart, 76, American disk drive pioneer, co-founder of Seagate Technology, complications from heart surgery.
- Charles Stourton, 26th Baron Mowbray, 83, British Conservative whip in the House of Lords, pneumonia.

=== 13 ===
- Henry Beachell, 100, American agriculturalist and recipient of the 1996 World Food Prize.
- Eileen Caddy, 89, British businessman, co-founder of the Findhorn Foundation.
- Richard Carlson, 45, American author, heart attack.
- Loyola de Palacio, 56, Spanish Vice-President of the European Commission, cancer.
- Alf Delany, 95, Irish Olympic sailor (1948, 1952).
- Ángel Nieves Díaz, 55, Puerto Rican murderer, lethal injection.
- Bruce Dickson, 74, New Zealand Olympic rower (1956).
- Homesick James, 96, American blues musician.
- Lamar Hunt, 74, American owner of Kansas City Chiefs, coiner of term "Super Bowl", complications of prostate cancer.
- Bernard Kleiman, 78, American general counsel to the United Steelworkers of America, heart attack.
- Charles Peter McColough, 84, Canadian businessman, CEO of Xerox Corporation, cardiac arrest.
- Frederick Norris, 85, British long-distance runner and Olympian (1952, 1956).
- Mario Ravagnan, 75, Italian Olympic fencer (1956, 1960, 1964).

=== 14 ===
- Anton Balasingham, 69, Sri Lankan LTTE senior negotiator, cholangiocarcinoma.
- Chuck Blair, 78, Canadian ice hockey player (Toronto Maple Leafs).
- John Bridge, 91, British recipient of the George Cross and George Medal, natural causes.
- Camille Darsières, 74, French politician deputy for Martinique's 3rd constituency (1993–2002).
- Harry Eden, 63, Australian rugby league footballer.
- Ahmet Ertegun, 83, American businessman, co-founder of Atlantic Records, head injury from a fall at a Rolling Stones concert.
- Mike Evans, 57, American actor (All in the Family, The Jeffersons) and television writer (Good Times), throat cancer.
- Kate Fleming, 41, American actress, audio book producer and narrator, drowned.
- John Hamilton, 84, British politician, leader of Liverpool City Council (1983–1986), lung disease.
- Robert Long, 63, Dutch singer, cancer.
- Sivuca, 76, Brazilian accordionist and composer, cancer.

=== 15 ===
- Federico Crescentini, 24, San Marino footballer, drowned.
- Mimi Jennewein, 85-86, American painter.
- Frank Johnson, 63, British journalist, editor of The Spectator (1995–1999), cancer.
- Raymond Lucas, 88, French cyclist.
- Clay Regazzoni, 67, Swiss Formula One racing driver (1970–1980), car accident.
- Mary Stolz, 86, American young adult novelist.
- François De Wael, 84, Belgian footballer.
- Matt Zunic, 87, American basketball player and coach.

=== 16 ===
- Alberto Bremauntz, 70, Mexican Olympic wrestler (1972).
- Al Dewsbury, 80, Canadian ice hockey player (Detroit Red Wings, Chicago Black Hawks).
- Chicho Jesurun, 59, Dutch baseball player and coach from the Netherlands Antilles, heart attack.
- Oginohana Masaaki, 71, Japanese sumo wrestler.
- Goce Nikolovski, 59, Macedonian singer, suicide by gunshot.
- Taliep Petersen, 56, South African theatre impresario, shot.
- John Rae, 75, British educator and writer, headmaster of Westminster School (1970–1986).
- Pnina Salzman, 84, Israeli pianist, natural causes.
- The Spoiler, 66, Canadian professional wrestler, heart attack.
- Cecil Travis, 93, American baseball player (Washington Senators).
- Larry Zox, 69, American artist, cancer.

=== 17 ===
- Joe Gill, 87, American comic book writer (Captain Atom, Peacemaker).
- Kyōko Kishida, 76, Japanese actress, respiratory failure caused by brain tumor.
- Esko Nikkari, 68, Finnish actor, pneumonia.
- Dick O'Keefe, 83, American basketball player (Washington Capitols).
- Timmie Rogers, 91, American comedian, singer-songwriter, bandleader and actor.
- Larry Sherry, 71, American baseball player (Los Angeles Dodgers, Detroit Tigers, Houston Astros), cancer.

=== 18 ===
- Abdul Amir al-Jamri, 67, Bahraini Shiite Muslim cleric, heart failure and kidney failure.
- Joseph Barbera, 95, American cartoonist, co-founder of Hanna-Barbera Productions, natural causes.
- Ruth Bernhard, 101, American photographer, natural causes.
- W. Craig Broadwater, 56, American judge, cancer.
- Denis Carter, Baron Carter, 74, British politician, Chief Whip in the House of Lords (1997–2002), cancer.
- Mike Dickin, 63, British Talksport radio presenter, car accident.
- Mavor Moore, 87, Canadian writer, actor, radio and television producer, illness.
- Mollie Orshansky, 91, American statistician and economist, cardiac arrest.
- Daniel Pinkham, 83, American composer, natural causes.

=== 19 ===
- Len Ablett, 90, Australian rules football player.
- Jack Burnley, 95, American comic book artist (Superman, Batman, Starman).
- Oonah McFee, 90, Canadian writer.
- Maj-Britt Nilsson, 82, Swedish actress (Summer Interlude, Secrets of Women).
- Akhtar Mohammad Osmani, Afghan Taliban commander, airstrike.
- Elisabeth Rivers-Bulkeley, 82, Austrian-born British first female member of the London Stock Exchange.
- Roy Ward, 83, Australian politician.

=== 20 ===
- Yukio Aoshima, 74, Japanese comedian, Governor of Tokyo (1995–1999), myelodysplastic syndrome.
- John Bishop, 77, American screenwriter and playwright.
- Elkan Blout, 87, American biochemist (Harvard University and the Polaroid Corporation), pneumonia.
- Anne Rogers Clark, 77, American dog show judge (Westminster Kennel Club Dog Show), kidney failure associated with colon cancer.
- Ma Ji, 72, Chinese xiangsheng actor, heart attack.
- Mick Mulligan, 78, British jazz trumpeter and bandleader.
- Piergiorgio Welby, 60, Italian poet and euthanasia advocate, removal of life support.

=== 21 ===
- Scobie Breasley, 92, Australian jockey, stroke.
- Augusto Carvacho, 92, Chilean Olympic basketball player (1936).
- Rogério Oliveira da Costa, 30, Brazilian-born Macedonian football player, heart attack.
- Warren Hair, 88, American basketball player.
- Lois Hall, 80, American actress, heart attack and stroke.
- Jerzy Janikowski, 54, Polish Olympic fencer (1972, 1976).
- Pierre Louki, 86, French actor and singer-songwriter.
- Saparmurat Niyazov, 66, Turkmen Communist party secretary (1985–1991), president (1990–2006), cardiac arrest.
- Philippa Pearce, 86, British children's author, stroke.
- Wilhelm Porrassalmi, 76, Finnish Olympic long jumper (1956).
- Karl Strauss, 94, German-born brewer for Pabst and Karl Strauss Brewing Company, natural causes.
- Sydney Wooderson, 92, British lawyer and track athlete, world record holder for mile run (1937–1942) and Olympian (1936), kidney failure.

=== 22 ===
- Richard Boston, 67, British journalist and author, illness.
- Sam Chapman, 90, American baseball player (Philadelphia Athletics, Cleveland Indians), complications from Alzheimer's disease.
- Ervin Lázár, 70, Hungarian writer, Kossuth Prize winner, lung failure.
- Dennis Linde, 63, American songwriter ("Burning Love", "Goodbye Earl"), idiopathic pulmonary fibrosis.
- Michael Morrison, 60, American pornographic actor.
- Elena Mukhina, 46, Russian gymnast, complications of quadriplegia.
- Terence O'Brien, 85, British diplomat, ambassador to Nepal, Burma and Indonesia.
- Phillip Pine, 86, American actor.
- Thomas Shoyama, 90, Canadian politician, heart failure and Parkinson's disease.
- Galina Ustvolskaya, 87, Russian composer, natural causes.
- Nikolay Yakovenko, 65, Soviet Russian wrestler and Olympian (1968, 1972).

=== 23 ===
- Sol Carter, 98, American baseball player (Philadelphia Athletics).
- Charlie Drake, 81, British comedian, actor and singer, complications from a stroke.
- Wilma Dykeman, 86, American author and journalist, complications from a hip fracture.
- Jimmy Lewthwaite, 86, English rugby league player (Barrow Raiders, national team).
- Dutch Mason, 68, Canadian blues musician, complications from diabetes.
- Bo Mya, 79, Burmese rebel leader, complications of heart disease and diabetes.
- Rosina Raisbeck, 90, Australian soprano singer.
- Robert Stafford, 93, American politician, governor of Vermont (1959–1961) and senator (1971–1989), natural causes.
- Timothy J. Tobias, 54, American composer and musician.

=== 24 ===
- Gino D'Antonio, 79, Italian comics writer and artist.
- Braguinha, 99, Brazilian composer, multiple organ failure.
- Mirko Sandić, 64, Serbian Olympic water polo player (1960, 1964, 1968, 1972).
- Abdolvahab Shahkhoreh, 70, Iranian Olympic sprinter (1964).
- Kenneth Sivertsen, 45, Norwegian folk singer, comedian and poet, brain trauma.
- Frank Stanton, 98, American president of CBS (1946–1971).

=== 25 ===
- James Brown, 73, American Hall of Fame soul singer ("Papa's Got a Brand New Bag", "I Got You (I Feel Good)", "It's a Man's Man's Man's World"), heart failure.
- John Butcher, 60, British Conservative MP (1979–1997), heart attack.
- Jerry Byers, 54, Canadian ice hockey player (Minnesota North Stars, Atlanta Flames, New York Rangers).
- Sir Bob Cotton, 91, Australian politician and ambassador to the United States (1982–1985, 1991–1994).
- Sven Lindberg, 88, Swedish actor.
- Bill Milner, 84, American football player (Chicago Bears, New York Giants).
- Oren Nichols, 88, American basketball player.
- Ingerid Vardund, 79, Norwegian actress.
- John Webb, 76, South African Olympic rower (1952).
- Tom Wham, 82, American football player (Furman Paladins, Chicago Cardinals).

=== 26 ===
- Robert Boehm, 92, American lawyer and chairman of the Center for Constitutional Rights.
- Sir Harold Bollers, 91, Guyanese jurist, Chief Justice.
- Chris Brown, 45, American baseball player (San Francisco Giants, San Diego Padres, Detroit Tigers), complications from burns.
- Gerald Ford, 93, American politician, President (1974–1977), Vice President (1973–1974), arteriosclerotic cerebrovascular disease and diffuse arteriosclerosis.
- Ivar Formo, 55, Norwegian cross-country skier and Olympian (1972, 1976), drowning.
- John Heath-Stubbs, 88, British poet and translator, lung cancer.
- Martin David Kruskal, 81, American mathematician (Princeton University), stroke.
- Fernand Nault, 85, Canadian ballet dancer and artistic director, Parkinson's disease.
- George Snell, 99, Canadian Anglican prelate, Bishop of Toronto (1966–1972).

=== 27 ===
- Richard Dean, 50, American model, photographer and television host, pancreatic cancer.
- Pierre Delanoë, 88, French lyricist, cardiac arrest.
- Gus Giesebrecht, 89, Canadian ice hockey player (Detroit Red Wings).
- Scotty Glacken, 62, American football player (Denver Broncos) and coach (Georgetown Hoyas).
- Itche Goldberg, 102, Polish-born American writer and Yiddish language preservationist.
- Marmaduke Hussey, Baron Hussey of North Bradley, 83, British media executive, chair of BBC Board of Governors (1986–1996).
- Tommy Sandlin, 62, Swedish ice hockey coach.

=== 28 ===
- Kōmei Abe, 95, Japanese composer.
- Gracie Cole, 82, British trumpeter and bandleader.
- Nicola Granieri, 64, Italian Olympic fencer (1964, 1968, 1972, 1976).
- Jamal Karimi-Rad, 50, Iranian Minister of Justice, car accident.
- Mandy Mitchell-Innes, 92, British oldest living test cricketer for England, natural causes.
- Jack Myers, 93, American biologist and science contributing editor (Highlights for Children), bladder cancer.
- Gershon Shaked, 77, Israeli author and professor of Hebrew Literature.
- Aroldo Tieri, 89, Italian actor.
- Maksymilian Więcek, 86, Polish Olympic ice hockey player (1948).

=== 29 ===
- Harald Bredesen, 88, American Lutheran pastor and advocate of speaking in tongues, injuries following a fall.
- Bud Delp, 74, American racehorse trainer inducted into the Thoroughbred Racing Hall of Fame, cancer.
- Thomas Garrigus, 60, American Olympic sports shooter (1968).
- Johnny Gibson, 101, American 400 meter hurdles world record holder (1927–1928) and Olympian (1928).
- Heimen Lagerwaard, 77, Dutch footballer.
- Charles Addo Odametey, 69, Ghanaian football player and Olympian (1964, 1968).
- Hubert Perrodo, 62, French businessman, founder of Perenco.
- Charlie Tyra, 71, American basketball player (New York Knicks), heart failure.
- Blagoje Vidinić, 72, Macedonian footballer, coach, and Olympian (1956, 1960).
- Red Wolf, 18, American world champion bucking bull.

=== 30 ===
- Winnie Baze, 92, American football player (Texas Tech Red Raiders, Philadelphia Eagles).
- Frank Campanella, 87, American actor (Overboard, Dick Tracy, Heaven Can Wait).
- Mitzi Cunliffe, 88, American sculptor.
- Elizabeth Greenhill, 99, English bookbinder
- Hans Hermannstädter, 88, Romanian Olympic handball player (1936).
- Saddam Hussein, 69, Iraqi President (1979–2003), execution by hanging.
- Antony Lambton, 84, British Conservative government minister.
- Donald Murray, 82, American columnist.
- Azumi Muto, 20, Japanese model and actress, homicide.
- Michel Plasse, 58, Canadian ice hockey player, cardiac arrest.
- Mario Ustolin, 82, Italian Olympic rower (1948).
- Gerald Washington, 57, American mayor-elect of Westlake, Louisiana, suicide by gunshot.

=== 31 ===
- Marv Breeding, 72, American baseball player (Baltimore Orioles, Los Angeles Dodgers, Washington Senators).
- John Denison, 95, British music administrator.
- James Harder, 80, American civil engineer.
- Ya'akov Hodorov, 79, Israeli football goalkeeper, stroke.
- Seymour Martin Lipset, 84, American sociologist, stroke.
- Leni Lohmar, 92, German Olympic swimmer (1936).
- Liese Prokop, 65, Austrian athlete, Minister of the Interior (2004–2006), and Olympian (1964, 1968, 1972), aortic dissection.
- George Sisler Jr., 89, American baseball player and executive.
- Joe Walton, 81, English football player (Preston North End).
- Tommy Wilson, 74, American football player (Los Angeles Rams, Cleveland Browns, Minnesota Vikings).
