= 1958 European Athletics Championships – Men's long jump =

Men's long jump at the European Athletics Championships

The men's long jump at the 1958 European Athletics Championships was held in Stockholm, Sweden, at Stockholms Olympiastadion on 19 and 20 August 1958.

== Medalists ==
Gold	Igor Ter-Ovanesyan; Soviet Union
Silver	Kazimierz Kropidłowski; Poland
Bronze	Henryk Grabowski; Poland

== Results ==
=== Final ===
20 August

Rank	Name	Nationality	Result	Notes
1st place, gold medalist(s)	Igor Ter-Ovanesyan	Soviet Union	7.81	CR NR
2nd place, silver medalist(s)	Kazimierz Kropidłowski	Poland	7.67	
3rd place, bronze medalist(s)	Henryk Grabowski	Poland	7.51	
4	Attilio Bravi	Italy	7.51	
5	Ali Brakchi	France	7.50	
6	Jorma Valkama	Finland	7.45	
7	Peter Scharp	West Germany	7.32	
8	Oleg Fedoseyev	Soviet Union	7.29	
9	Vilhelm Porrassalmi	Finland	7.27	
10	Ödön Földessy	Hungary	7.20	
11	Ernst Heckendorn	Switzerland	7.01	
	Manfred Molzberger	West Germany	NM	

=== Qualification ===
19 August

Rank	Name	Nationality	Result	Notes
1	Igor Ter-Ovanesyan	Soviet Union	7.65	CR Q
2	Kazimierz Kropidłowski	Poland	7.63	Q
3	Henryk Grabowski	Poland	7.61	Q
4	Peter Scharp	West Germany	7.52	Q
5	Jorma Valkama	Finland	7.51	Q
6	Manfred Molzberger	West Germany	7.46	Q
7	Attilio Bravi	Italy	7.42	Q
8	Ödön Földessy	Hungary	7.31	Q
9	Ali Brakchi	France	7.20	Q
10	Oleg Fedoseyev	Soviet Union	7.19	Q
11	Vilhelm Porrassalmi	Finland	7.17	Q
12	Ernst Heckendorn	Switzerland	7.14	Q
13	Branko Miler	Yugoslavia	7.10	
14	Torgny Wahlander	Sweden	7.10	
15	Arne Eriksson	Sweden	7.09	
16	Georges Salmon	Belgium	7.07	
17	Dimitrios Spyropoulos	Greece	7.04	
18	Albert Hofstede	Netherlands	7.02	
19	José María Isasa	Spain	6.89	
20	Stoyan Slavkov	Bulgaria	6.85	
21	Gustav Schlosser	Switzerland	6.65	

== Participation ==
According to an unofficial count, 21 athletes from 15 countries participated in the event.

- Belgium (1)
- Bulgaria (1)
- Finland (2)
- France (1)
- Greece (1)
- Hungary (1)
- Italy (1)
- Netherlands (1)
- Poland (2)
- Soviet Union (2)
- Spain (1)
- Sweden (2)
- Switzerland (2)
- West Germany (2)
- Yugoslavia (1)
