= Athletics at the 1956 Summer Olympics – Men's long jump =

Men's long jump at the Games of the XVI Olympiad
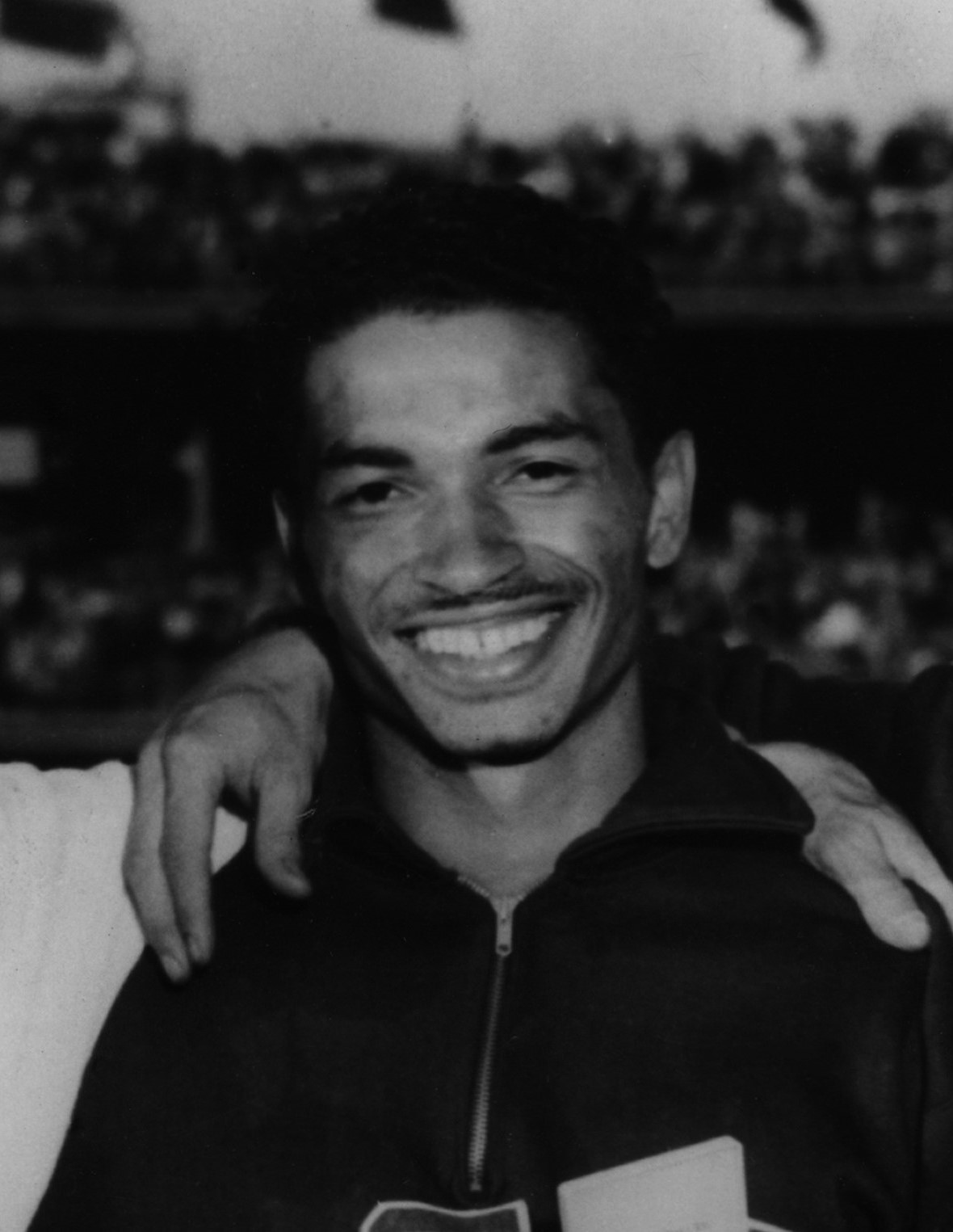
- Greg Bell
- Venue: Olympic Park Stadium
- Date: 24 November 1956
- Competitors: 32 from 21 nations
- Winning distance: 7.83

Medalists
1st place, gold medalist(s)		Gregory Bell	United States
2nd place, silver medalist(s)		John Bennett	United States
3rd place, bronze medalist(s)		Jorma Valkama	Finland

Video on YouTube Official Video @1:16:05

The men's long jump was an event at the 1956 Summer Olympics in Melbourne, Australia. The qualifying stage and the final both were held on the second day of the track and field competition, on Saturday November 24, 1956. Thirty-two athletes from 21 nations competed. The maximum number of athletes per nation had been set at 3 since the 1930 Olympic Congress. The event was won by 15 cm by Greg Bell of the United States, the nation's seventh consecutive and 12th overall victory in the event. Jorma Valkama's bronze medal was Finland's first medal in the men's long jump.

== Summary ==
The number one qualifier was Henryk Grabowski, but he was unable to produce similar results in the final. The world record was not in the discussion, with world record holder Jesse Owens sitting in the stands more than 21 years after he had jumped 8.13m. Owens also set the Olympic record at 8.06m in 1936. #2 qualifier John Bennett took the first round lead with a 7.68m jump. Dmitriy Bondarenko was in second with a 7.44m and in the first Olympics for Nigeria, Karim Olowu was in third with 7.28m. In the second round, Gregory Bell hit the winner, 7.83 m (25 ft 8 1/4 in). In the third round, Jorma Valkama jumped into bronze position with a 7.48m. In the fourth round Bell reaffirmed his position with a 7.77m.

== Background ==
This was the 13th appearance of the event, which is one of 12 athletics events to have been held at every Summer Olympics. The returning finalists from the 1952 Games were bronze medalist Ödön Földessy of Hungary, tenth-place finisher Masaji Tajima of Japan, and eleventh-place finisher Neville Price of South Africa.

Israel, Liberia, Pakistan, Uganda, and Uruguay each made their first appearance in the event. The United States appeared for the 13th time, the only nation to have long jumpers at each of the Games thus far.

== Competition format ==
The 1956 competition used the two-round format with divided final introduced in 1952. The qualifying round gave each competitor three jumps to achieve a distance of 7.15 metres; if fewer than 12 men did so, the top 12 (including all those tied) would advance. The final provided each jumper with three jumps; the top six jumpers received an additional three jumps for a total of six, with the best to count (qualifying round jumps were not considered for the final).

== Records ==
Prior to this competition, the existing world and Olympic records were as follows.

World record	Jesse Owens (USA)	8.13	Ann Arbor, United States	25 May 1935
Olympic record	Jesse Owens (USA)	8.06	Berlin, Germany	4 August 1936

No new world or Olympic records were set for this event.

== Schedule ==
All times are Australian Eastern Standard Time (UTC+10)

Date	Time	Round
Saturday, 24 November 1956	10:00; 15:50	Qualifying; Final

== Results ==
=== Qualifying ===
For the qualifying round, competitors needed to hit the standard of 7.15 meters in order to reach the final, with a minimum of 12 competitors making the final. Since 13 athletes hit the standard, no extra berths were given for the final. After an athlete met the standard in the qualifying round, they were not required to finish their three jumps, denoted by a dash in the table. A foul is denoted by an "X".

Rank	Athlete	Nation	1	2	3	Distance	Notes
1	Henryk Grabowski	Poland	7.52	—	—	7.52	Q
2	John Bennett	United States	7.50	—	—	7.50	Q
3	Oleg Fyodoseyev	Soviet Union	7.04	7.42	—	7.42	Q
4	Ken Wilmshurst	Great Britain	6.95	7.40	—	7.40	Q
5	Dmytro Bondarenko	Soviet Union	6.97	6.95	7.37	7.37	Q
6	Jorma Valkama	Finland	7.13	6.92	7.36	7.36	Q
7	Gregory Bell	United States	7.35	—	—	7.35	Q
8	Roy Cruttenden	Great Britain	7.32	—	—	7.32	Q
9	Fermín Donazar	Uruguay	7.31	—	—	7.31	Q
10	Karim Olowu	Nigeria	7.05	7.29	—	7.29	Q
11	Neville Price	South Africa	7.28	—	—	7.28	Q
12	Kazimierz Kropidłowski	Poland	7.10	7.22	—	7.22	Q
13	Igor Ter-Ovanesyan	Soviet Union	7.15	—	—	7.15	Q
14	Yoshiro Sonoda	Japan	6.77	7.01	7.12	7.12	
15	Masaji Tajima	Japan	6.98	X	7.11	7.11	
16	Ling Te-Sheng	Republic of China	6.85	6.74	7.11	7.11	
17	Muhammad Ramzan Ali	Pakistan	6.75	7.11	X	7.11	
18	Seo Yeong-ju	South Korea	7.08	7.09	6.92	7.09	
19	Mike Moroney	Australia	6.72	7.09	X	7.09	
20	Ary de Sá	Brazil	6.86	7.00	6.97	7.00	
21	Odon Foldessy	Hungary	6.96	6.92	6.93	6.96	
22	Ram Mehar	India	6.92	6.84	5.53	6.92	
23	Ian Bruce	Australia	X	6.91	6.80	6.91	
24	Hugh Jack	Australia	6.90	6.87	6.45	6.90	
25	David Kushnir	Israel	6.09	6.89	6.66	6.89	
26	Fred Hammer	Luxembourg	6.74	X	X	6.74	
27	Lawrence Ogwang	Uganda	6.62	6.51	6.28	6.62	
28	Wilhelm Porrassalmi	Finland	X	6.58	X	6.58	
29	Rafio Oluwa	Nigeria	X	6.53	X	6.53	
30	Muhammad Rashid	Pakistan	6.13	6.10	5.90	6.13	
31	Edward Martins	Liberia	5.79	6.01	5.96	6.01	
—	Torgny Wahlander	Sweden	X	X	X	No mark	
—	Ken Box	Great Britain	DNS				
—	Asnoldo Devonish	Venezuela	DNS				
—	Rafer Johnson	United States	DNS				
—	Gabuh bin Piging	North Borneo	DNS				
—	A. Abdul Razzak	Iraq	DNS				
—	Martin Řehák	Czechoslovakia	DNS				
—	Hiroshi Shibata	Japan	DNS				
—	Mohinder Singh	India	DNS				

=== Final ===
The final round included all 13 competitors who had qualified earlier that day by reaching the mark of 7.15 meters. The finals format was set up in two sections. All 13 athletes made three jumps, and all but the best six jumpers were eliminated. Finally, three more jumps were contested for the top six; however, any jump made over all six attempts counted towards the final ranking. A dash means that the jumper elected not to attempt that round.

Rank	Athlete	Nation	1	2	3	4	5	6	Distance
1st place, gold medalist(s)	Gregory Bell	United States	6.98	7.83	7.77	X	—	7.16	7.83
2nd place, silver medalist(s)	John Bennett	United States	7.68	7.61	X	—	X	—	7.68
3rd place, bronze medalist(s)	Jorma Valkama	Finland	7.11	X	7.48	7.07	7.22	7.00	7.48
4	Dmytro Bondarenko	Soviet Union	7.44	X	7.13	X	6.89	6.99	7.44
5	Karim Olowu	Nigeria	7.28	6.77	7.36	6.42	X	6.91	7.36
6	Kazimierz Kropidłowski	Poland	7.27	6.92	7.30	6.95	7.03	6.94	7.30
7	Neville Price	South Africa	X	7.28	X	did not advance			7.28
8	Oleg Fyodoseyev	Soviet Union	X	7.25	7.27	did not advance			7.27
9	Roy Cruttenden	Great Britain	7.15	X	6.96	did not advance			7.15
10	Henryk Grabowski	Poland	X	X	7.15	did not advance			7.15
11	Ken Wilmshurst	Great Britain	7.14	7.06	7.05	did not advance			7.14
12	Fermín Donazar	Uruguay	X	X	6.57	did not advance			6.57
—	Igor Ter-Ovanesyan	Soviet Union	X	X	X	did not advance			No mark
