= Atter (disambiguation) =

Atter is poison or venom.

Atter may also refer to:

== People ==
- Tom Atter
- Mahmoud Atter Abdel Fattah

== Places ==
- Atter Shisha
- Atter (Osnabrück), district in the west of Osnabrück, Lower Saxony, Germany

== Other ==
- Ätter, Norse clans, a social group based on common descent
- Gigantochloa atter, a species of bamboo

== See also ==
- Otter (disambiguation)
