= Köppen =

Köppen is a German surname. Notable people with the surname include:

- Bernd Köppen (1951–2014), German pianist and composer
- Carl Köppen (1833-1907), German military advisor in Meiji era Japan
- Edlef Köppen (1893–1939), German author and radio editor
- Friedrich Köppen (1775–1858), German philosopher
- Fritz Köppen (1935–2022), German long jumper
- Gerhard Köppen (1918–1942), German fighter pilot
- Jan Köppen (born 1983), German television presenter and DJ
- Jens Köppen (born 1966), German rower
- Johann Heinrich Justus Köppen (1755–1791), German philologist and teacher
- Karl Friedrich Köppen (1808–1863), German teacher and political journalist
- Kerstin Köppen (born 1967), German rower
- Peter von Köppen (1793–1864), Russian ethnographer, historian, statistician, and geographer of German heritage
- Rudi Köppen (born 1943), German athlete
- Sandra Köppen (botn 1975), German judoka
- Wladimir Köppen (1846–1940), German geographer, meteorologist, climatologist and botanist
  - Köppen climate classification, developed by Wladimir Köppen
  - Köppen Point in South Georgia, named after Wladimir Köppen
  - 52295 Köppen, asteroid named after Wladimir Köppen

== See also ==
- Erik Køppen (1923–2019), Danisk football player
- Lene Køppen (born 1953), Danish badminton player
- Koeppen
- Koppen
