= 1962 European Athletics Championships – Men's long jump =

Men's long jump at the European Athletics Championships

The men's long jump at the 1962 European Athletics Championships was held in Belgrade, then Yugoslavia, at JNA Stadium on 13 and 14 September 1962.

== Medalists ==
Gold	Igor Ter-Ovanesyan; Soviet Union
Silver	Rainer Stenius; Finland
Bronze	Pentti Eskola; Finland

== Results ==
=== Final ===
14 September

Rank	Name	Nationality	Result	Wind
1st place, gold medalist(s)	Igor Ter-Ovanesyan	Soviet Union	8.19	+3.2
2nd place, silver medalist(s)	Rainer Stenius	Finland	7.85	
3rd place, bronze medalist(s)	Pentti Eskola	Finland	7.85	
4	Dmitriy Bondarenko	Soviet Union	7.83	
5	Waldemar Gawron	Poland	7.73	
6	Henrik Kalocsai	Hungary	7.66	
7	Klaus Beer	East Germany	7.52	
8	Ali Brakchi	France	7.41	
9	John Howell	Great Britain	7.40	
10	Ivan Ivanov	Bulgaria	7.33	
11	Lynn Davies	Great Britain	7.33	
12	Jorma Valkama	Finland	6.78	

=== Qualification ===
13 September

Rank	Name	Nationality	Result	Notes
1	Igor Ter-Ovanesyan	Soviet Union	7.82	Q, CR
2	Dmitriy Bondarenko	Soviet Union	7.67	Q
3	Jorma Valkama	Finland	7.65	Q
4	Pentti Eskola	Finland	7.62	Q
5	Ali Brakchi	France	7.57	Q
6	Rainer Stenius	Finland	7.51	Q
7	Waldemar Gawron	Poland	7.49	Q
8	Ivan Ivanov	Bulgaria	7.45	Q
9	Klaus Beer	East Germany	7.45	Q
10	Henrik Kalocsai	Hungary	7.41	Q
11	John Howell	Great Britain	7.37	Q
12	Lynn Davies	Great Britain	7.37	Q
13	Wolfgang Klein	West Germany	7.36	
14	Mihai Calnicov	Romania	7.32	
15	Luis Felipe Areta	Spain	7.27	
16	Pedro de Almeida	Portugal	7.23	
17	John Morbey	Great Britain	7.12	
18	Alain Veron	France	7.09	
19	Pierre Schneidegger	Switzerland	7.06	
20	Bronislav Munjic	Yugoslavia	7.01	

== Participation ==
According to an unofficial count, 20 athletes from 14 countries participated in the event.

- Bulgaria (1)
- East Germany (1)
- Finland (3)
- France (2)
- Hungary (1)
- Poland (1)
- Portugal (1)
- Romania (1)
- Soviet Union (2)
- Spain (1)
- Switzerland (1)
- Great Britain (3)
- West Germany (1)
- Yugoslavia (1)
