= Yukishige =

- Pronunciation: jɯkʲiɕige (IPA)
- Gender: Male

Origin
- Origin: Japanese
- Meaning: Different meanings depending on the kanji used

Other names
- Alternative spelling: Yukisige (Kunrei-shiki) Yukisige (Nihon-shiki) Yukishige (Hepburn)

Yukishige is a masculine Japanese given name.

== Written forms ==
Yukishige can be written using different combinations of kanji characters. Examples:

- 幸重, "happiness, heavy"
- 幸茂, "happiness, luxuriant"
- 幸繁, "happiness, prosperous"
- 行重, "to go, heavy"
- 行茂, "to go, luxuriant"
- 行繁, "to go, prosperous"
- 之重, "of, heavy"
- 之茂, "of, luxuriant"
- 之繁, "of, prosperous"
- 志重, "determination, heavy"
- 志茂, "determination, luxuriant"
- 志繁, "determination, prosperous"
- 恭重, "respectful, heavy"
- 潔重, "pure, heavy"
- 雪重, "snow, heavy"

The name can also be written in hiragana ゆきしげ or katakana ユキシゲ.

== Notable people with the name ==
- Yukishige Okubo (大久保 潔重; born 1966), Japanese politician
- Yukishige Yasuma (安間 之重; born 1938), Japanese long jumper
