= John Howell (athlete) =

British long jumper

Personal information
- Nationality: British (English)
- Born: 10 April 1936 (age 90) London, England
- Height: 6 ft 4 in (1.93 m)
- Weight: 201 lb (91 kg)

Sport
- Sport: Athletics
- Event: Long jump
- Club: Herne Hill Harriers

John David Howell (born 10 April 1936) is a former British long jumper.

== Biography ==
Howell was born in London, England and was a member of the Herne Hill Harriers.

He first competed internationally at the 1960 Summer Olympics in Rome, Italy. Representing Great Britain, he finished in 27th place in the qualifying round of the long jump event with a jump of 7.19 metres.

Howell finished second behind John Oladitan in the long jump event at the 1961 AAA Championships and second behind Jorma Valkama at the 1962 AAA Championships but by virtue of being the highest placed British athlete he was considered the British long jump champion.

Shortly afterwards at the 1962 European Athletics Championships in Belgrade, Yugoslavia, Howell finished seventh in the final of the long jump with a leap of 24 ft 3 1/2 in (7.40 m). and two months later representing England, Howell finished in eighth place in the long jump at the 1962 British Empire and Commonwealth Games in Perth, Western Australia with a jump of 24 ft 2 3/4 in (7.39 m). At the same meet, Howell finished 11th in the triple jump with a leap of 27 ft 0 in (8.23 m) and was also due to compete in the high jump but pulled out to focus on the other events.
