= Reerh =

Reerh ر یڑھ, Rerh
- Village/Town
- Country: Pakistan
- Region: Khyber-Pakhtunkhwa
- District: Mansehra District
- Time zone: UTC+5 (PST)

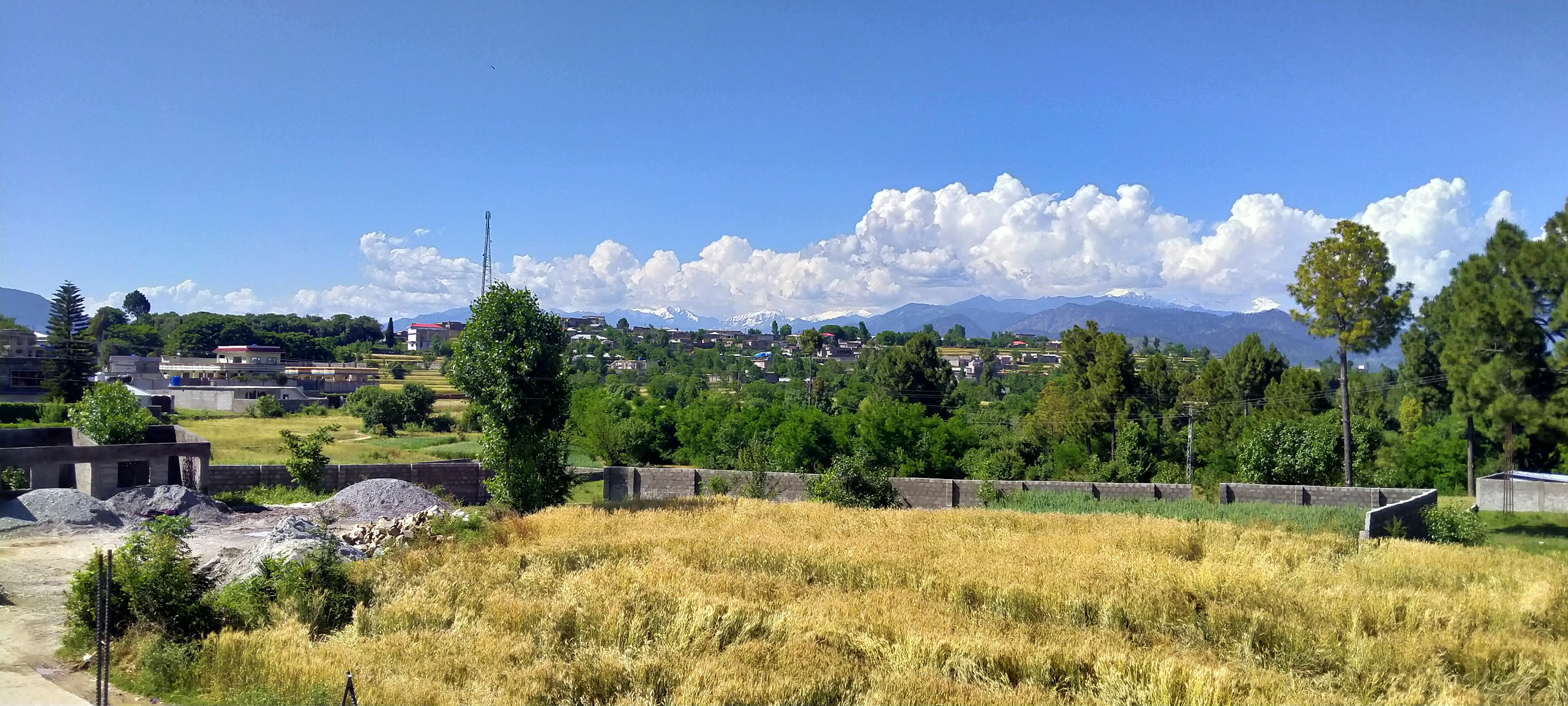

Rerh/Reerh (Urdu=ر یڑھ) is a small village near Atter Shisha in the Union Council Sandasar in Mansehra District in the Khyber-Pakhtunkhwa province of Pakistan.

== Geographical location ==
This small village is in the North East of Mansehra city and in south to the New-Balakot. The village is located on Mansehra Kaghan Road/ N-15 National Highway, which connects Mansehra with Kaghan, Naran and Chilas. It is about 12 km from Mansehra on Naran Road. It is almost a four-hour drive from the capital Islamabad. The village is one of the places inhabited by the 2005 Kashmir earthquake affectees from Balakot and other places.

== Cultural diversity and environment ==
The village has a number of different ethnic groups, including Awan, Swati, Gujar, Sayyeds and Afghans. This diversity is also reflected in the languages spoken in the village, which include Hindko, Pashto and Urdu. An historical shrine, the "Sinjlian shrin", and historical ruins are located in the forest of the village. An old water mill is also located on the rain water stream.

The village is in a small valley surrounded by the Himalayan mountains. One of the most prominent peaks in Pakistan, Musa ka Musala, is visible from the village.

== Health and education facilities ==
After the 2005 earthquake, the village was one of the main focus to the rehabilitation facilities. A charity based eye-hospital was established by Layton Rahmatulla Benevolent Trust, which treat patients from all over the Mansehra. Similarly, a Model school was opened by the Muslim Hands organisation, called the Muslim Hands School of Excellence. The primary objective was to provide quality education to the orphans. Considering the quality of education in the school, many parents are interested in to providing education to their children on charged basis. Very recently, a children hospital has also been established in the village. A government high school is also located in the village for girls and a primary school for boys, contributing to the literacy of its inhabitants.
