= Michael Moroney =

Michael Moroney may refer to:

- Mike Moroney (1933–2015), Australian athlete
- Mick Moroney (born 1950), Irish hurler
- Michael Moroney (horseman) (1959–2025), New Zealand racehorse trainer

== See also ==
- Mike Maroney, member of the West Virginia Senate
