= Ebina (disambiguation) =

Ebina may refer to:

- Ebina, Kanagawa, a city in Japan
- Ebina Station in Ebina, Kanagawa
- Ebina (surname), a Japanese surname
- 36472 Ebina
