= Anthony Watson (long jumper) =

American long jumper (1941–2021)

Personal information
- Nationality: American
- Born: February 5, 1941
- Died: March 9, 2021 (aged 80)

Sport
- Sport: Athletics
- Event: Long jump

Anthony Watson (February 5, 1941 – March 9, 2021) was an American athlete. He competed in the men's long jump at the 1960 Summer Olympics. After graduating from Douglass High School, Watson competed in college at the University of Oklahoma for their track and field team winning the national championship in the long jump in 1962. After his collegiate career he transferred to Central State University and received his degree.
