= Yalçın Ünsal =

Turkish long jumper

Personal information
- Nationality: Turkish
- Born: 1933 (age 92–93)

Sport
- Sport: Athletics
- Event: Long jump

Yalçın Ünsal (born 1933) is a Turkish athlete. He competed in the men's long jump at the 1960 Summer Olympics.
