= John Bennett (long jumper) =

American long jumper (born 1930)

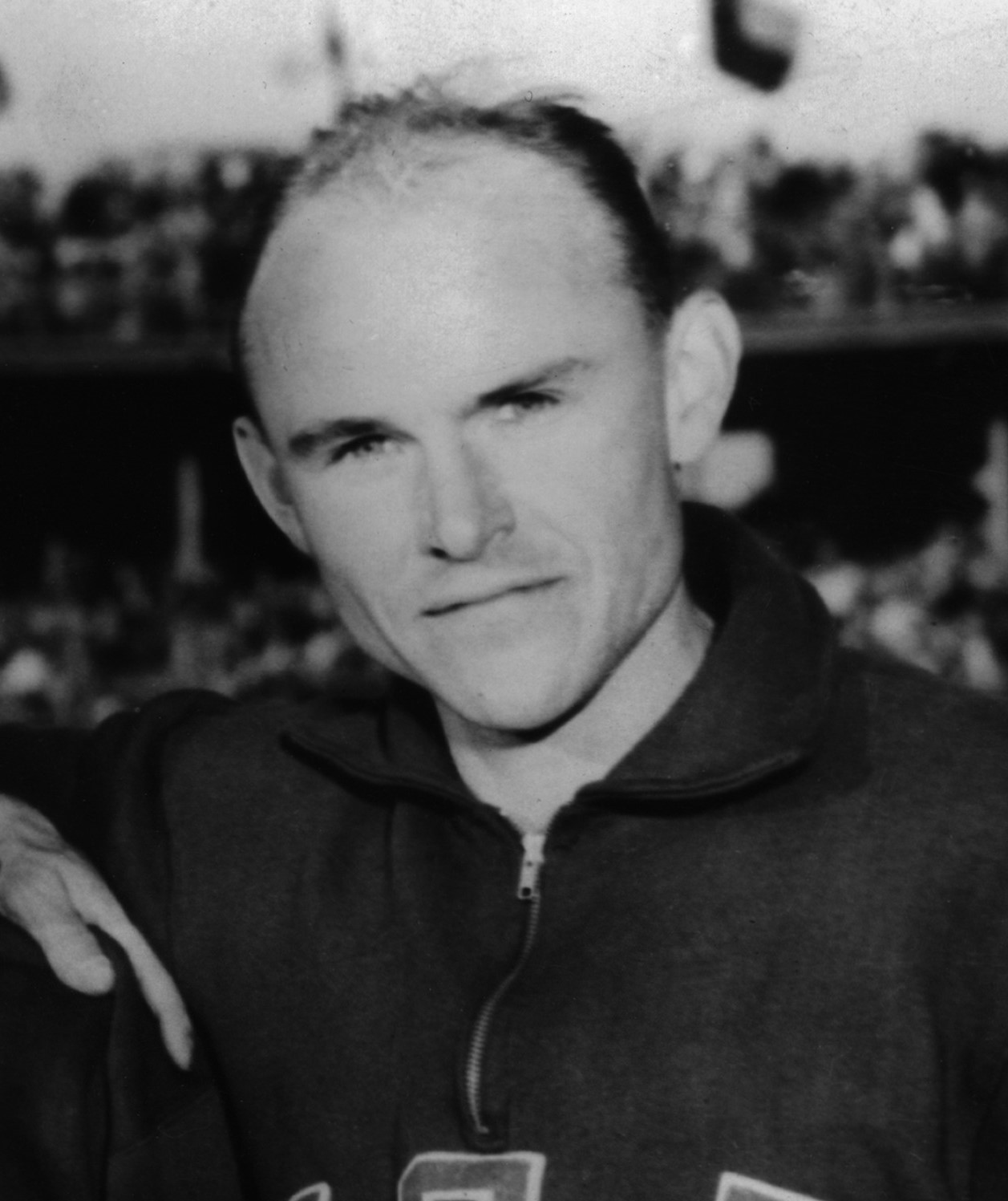
- Bennett in 1956

Personal information
- Full name: John Dale Bennett
- Born: November 14, 1930 (age 95) Grand Forks, North Dakota, U.S.
- Height: 5 ft 8 in (173 cm)
- Weight: 150 lb (68 kg)
Medal record
Men's athletics
Representing United States
Olympic Games
Silver medal – second place	1956 Melbourne	Long jump

John Dale Bennett (born November 14, 1930) was an American athlete who competed mainly in the long jump. He was born in Grand Forks, North Dakota. He competed for the United States in the 1956 Summer Olympics held in Melbourne, Australia in the long jump, where he won the silver medal. Bennett attended Marquette University and won two NCAA titles while competing for the school's track and field team.

Bennett is the father of NASCAR talk show host Claire B. Lang, the "First Lady" of NASCAR Radio.
