= Pentti Eskola (athlete) =

Finnish long jumper

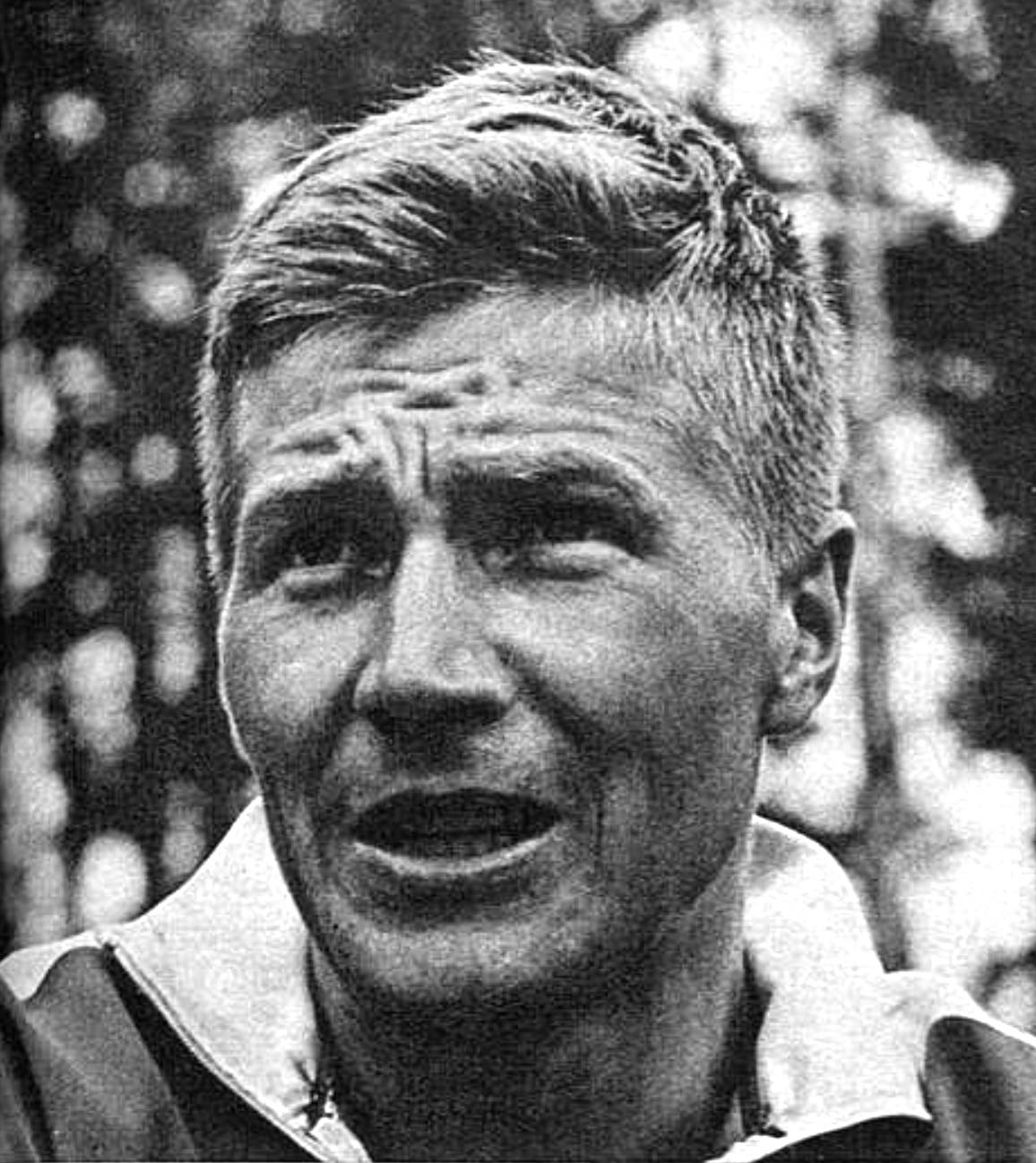

Personal information
- Nationality: Finnish
- Born: 16 July 1938 (age 87)

Sport
- Sport: Athletics
- Event: Long jump
Medal record
Men's athletics
Representing Finland
European Championships
Bronze medal – third place	1962 Belgrade	Long jump

Pentti Eskola (born 16 July 1938) is a Finnish athlete. He competed in the men's long jump at the 1964 Summer Olympics.
