= Virsa Singh =

Indian long jumper (1933–2019)

Personal information
- Nationality: Indian
- Born: 16 April 1933 Raila, Bhilwara
- Died: August 2019 manteca, California, america

Sport
- Sport: Athletics
- Event: Long jump

Virsa Singh (21 April 1931– August 2019) was an Indian athlete. He competed in the men's long jump at the 1960 Summer Olympics.
