= Sandasar =

Sand-e-sar
- Village and union council
- Country: Pakistan
- Region: Khyber Pakhtunkhwa
- District: Mansehra District
- Time zone: UTC+5 (PST)

Sandesar is a village and union council (an administrative subdivision) of Mansehra District in the Khyber Pakhtunkhwa Province of Pakistan. It is located in the south of the district and lies to the west of the district capital Mansehra. The Union Council includes the village of Reerh.
