= Koeppen =

Koeppen is a German surname. Notable people with the surname include:

- Adolf Otto Koeppen (1902–1972), German painter
- Andreas Koeppen (born 1961), German politician (SPD)
- Hans Koeppen (1876–1948), German soldier and race driver
- Jens Koeppen (born 1962), German politician (CDU)
- Martina Koeppen (born 1967), German politician (SPD)
- Werner Koeppen (1910–1994), German Nazi, assistant to Alfred Rosenberg
- Wolfgang Koeppen (1906–1996), German author

== See also ==
- Köppen
- Koppen
