= Revaz Kvachakidze =

Georgian long jumper

Personal information
- Nationality: Georgian
- Born: 12 February 1938 (age 88)

Sport
- Sport: Athletics
- Event: Long jump

Revaz Kvachakidze (born 12 February 1938) is a Georgian athlete. He competed in the men's long jump at the 1960 Summer Olympics, representing the Soviet Union.
