= William Salcer =

Slovak-Jewish Holocaust survivor and inventor

William Zev Salcer
- Born: 4 June 1924; Neporadza, Czechoslovakia
- Died: 6 December 2006 (aged 82); Manhattan, New York City, United States
- Occupations: Inventor; Engineer
- Known for: Holocaust survivor; Inventions in plastics and hockey equipment
- Spouse: Katarina Kellner
- Children: Ron Salcer
- Relatives: Lily Gero (sister)

William Zev Salcer (4 June 1924 – 6 December 2006) was an inventor and Holocaust survivor. He had Slovak-Jewish ethnicity, but he was primarily an Israeli and American citizen.

== Birth and war years ==
Salcer was born in the village of Neporadza, Czechoslovakia to a wealthy family but was raised in Jelšava which became part of Hungary following the division and occupation of Czechoslovakia by Nazi Germany and fascist Hungary. He moved to Budapest and since Jewish students were banned from the Universities in Hungary, he took engineering courses in high school and worked as a welder's assistant while rooming with an uncle. An illness forced him to return to Jelšava, where he was made a forced laborer and made to repair tanks for the Wehrmacht; shortly thereafter, in advance of the Soviet Red Army, he and his fellow prisoners were force-marched to the Mauthausen-Gusen concentration camp. After his camp was liberated by the American Army, Salcer found his sister, Lily Gero, who had been at Auschwitz and he also met his wife Katarina Kellner who had also survived Auschwitz.

== Post war ==
After he was liberated, Salcer attempted to recover his family's lost wealth, but was unable to do so. He experienced further discrimination in Czechoslovakia and fled to Israel, after receiving a draft notice for the Czechoslovak Army. After arrival in Israel, Salcer worked with the Haganah, where he designed tanks and armored cars and later designed jet engines for the Israeli Air Force. In 1952, after his discharge, he started a rubber factory and was elected to be the head of the association of Israeli manufacturers at age 28.

== Immigration to the United States and inventions ==
After the Suez Crisis, in 1958 Salcer decided that Israel would experience endless warfare and immigrated to the United States, where he developed plastic tablecloths and a plastic display for earrings. He also designed a new type of hockey puck and hockey sticks after his son Ron Salcer became an agent for hockey players. He held 12 patents.

== Death ==
According to his biographer Donna Z. Rubenstone, Salcer died of leukemia in Manhattan. He was 82.
