= Ebina (surname) =

Ebina (written: 蝦名, 海老名) is a Japanese surname. Notable people with the surname include:

- Danjo Ebina (海老名 弾正; 1856–1937), Japanese Christian missionary and educator
- Hiroya Ebina (蝦名 大也; 1959–2026), Japanese politician
- Jun Ebina (蝦名 純; born 1939), Japanese long jumper
- Kenichi Ebina (蛯名 健一; born 1974), Japanese dancer
- Masayoshi Ebina (蛯名 正義; born 1969), Japanese former jockey and horse trainer
- Midori Ebina (海老名 美どり; born 1953), Japanese former actress
- Yutaka Ebina (蛯名 豊; born 1943), Japanese ice hockey player
