= Ling Te-Sheng =

Taiwanese long jumper (1928–2018)

Personal information
- Nationality: Taiwanese
- Born: 24 December 1928 Renli, Ji'an, Hualien, Taiwan
- Died: 29 December 2018 (aged 90) Renli, Ji'an, Hualien, Taiwan

Sport
- Sport: Athletics
- Event: Long jump

Ling Te-Sheng (24 December 1928 – 29 December 2018) was a Taiwanese athlete. He competed in the men's long jump at the 1956 Summer Olympics.
