= Koppen =

Koppen is a surname. Notable people with the surname include:

- Dan Koppen (born 1979), American football offensive lineman
- Erwin Koppen (1929–1990), German literary scholar
- Luise Koppen (1855–1922), German author
- Otto C. Koppen (1901–1991), American aircraft engineer

== See also ==
- Koeppen, surname
- Köppen, surname
- Lene Køppen (born 1953), Danish badminton player
