= Kazimierz Kropidłowski =

Polish long jumper

Personal information
- Nationality: Polish
- Born: 16 August 1931 Starogard, Pomeranian Voivodeship, Second Polish Republic
- Died: 3 March 1998 (aged 66) Starogard Gdański, Gdańsk Voivodeship, Third Polish Republic

Sport
- Event: Long jump
Medal record
Men's athletics
Representing Poland
European Championships
Silver medal – second place	1958 Stockholm	Long jump

Kazimierz Kropidłowski (16 August 1931 – 20 December 1998) was a Polish long jumper. He was born in Starogard. He competed at the 1956 Summer Olympics in Melbourne, where he placed sixth in men's long jump.

His personal best in the event was 7.82 metres set in 1959, which was the national record at the time.

== International competitions ==
Year	Competition	Venue	Position	Event	Notes
Representing Poland
1955	World Festival of Youth and Students	Warsaw, Poland	2nd	Long jump	7.29 m
1956	Olympic Games	Melbourne, Australia	6th	Long jump	7.30 m
1958	European Championships	Stockholm, Sweden	2nd	Long jump	7.67 m
1960	Olympic Games	Rome, Italy	16th (q)	Long jump	7.37 m
