= Heimen Lagerwaard =

Dutch footballer

Personal information
- Date of birth: 23 April 1929
- Date of death: 29 December 2006 (aged 77)

International career
Years	Team	Apps	(Gls)
1953	Netherlands	1	(0)

Heimen Lagerwaard (23 April 1929 – 29 December 2006) was a Dutch footballer. He played in one match for the Netherlands national football team in 1953.
