= Bevyn Baker =

Australian long jumper

Bevyn Baker (born 8 August 1937) is an Australian former long jumper who competed in the 1960 Summer Olympics.
