= Gustav Schlosser =

Swiss long jumper

Personal information
- Nationality: Swiss
- Born: 18 August 1939 (age 86)

Sport
- Sport: Athletics
- Event: Long jump

Gustav Schlosser (born 18 August 1939) is a Swiss athlete. He competed in the men's long jump at the 1960 Summer Olympics.
