= Neporadza, Rimavská Sobota District =

Neporadza Naprágy
- Municipality
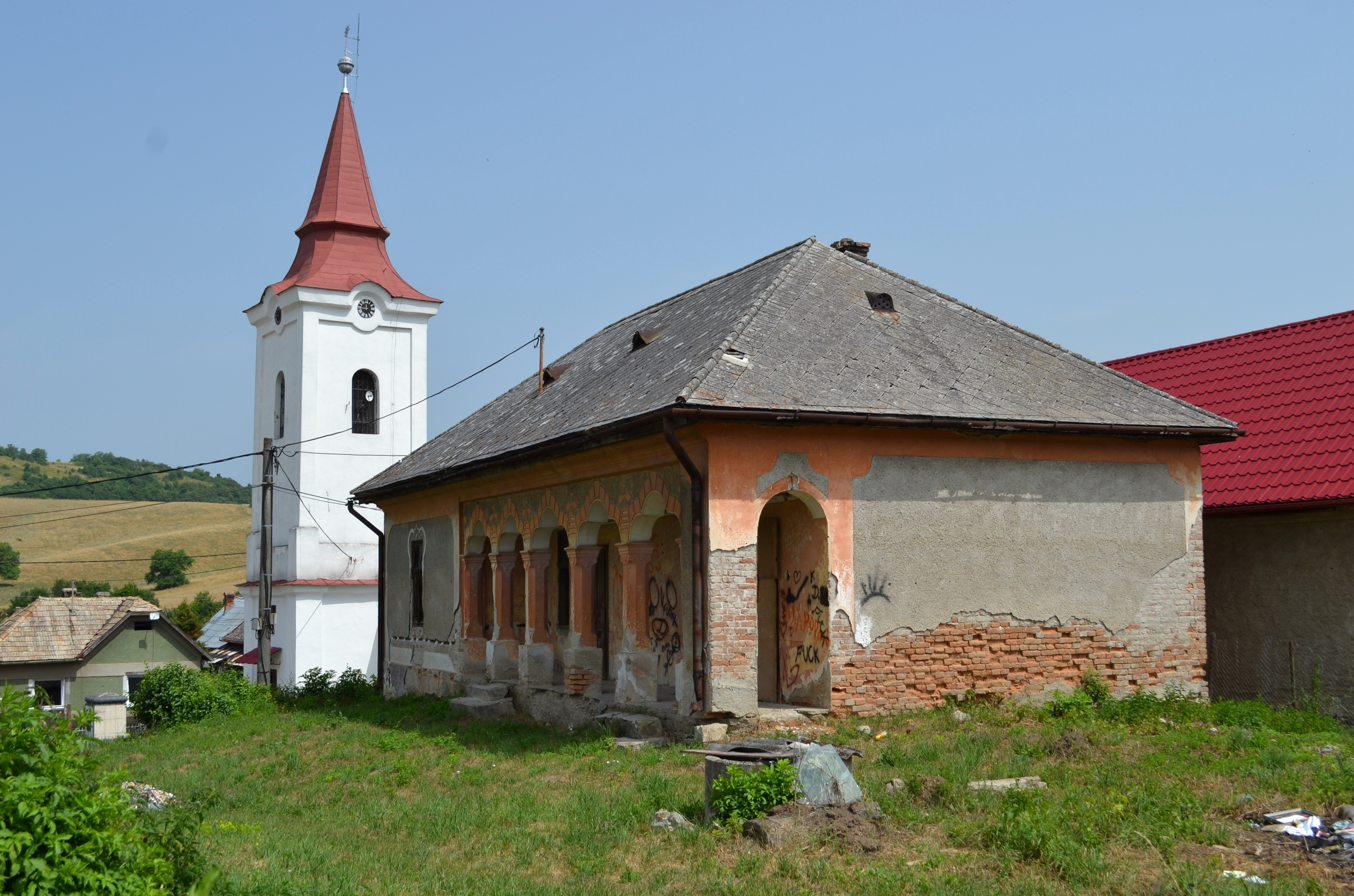

- Flag

- Location of Neporadza in the Banská Bystrica Region Location of Neporadza in Slovakia
- Coordinates: 48°21′45″N 20°23′30″E
- Country: Slovakia
- Region: Banská Bystrica Region
- District: Rimavská Sobota District
- First mentioned: 1254

Area
  - Total: 7.01 km^{2} (2.71 sq mi)
- Elevation: 216 m (709 ft)

Population (2025)
  - Total: 294
- Time zone: UTC+1 (CET)
  - Summer (DST): UTC+2 (CEST)
- Postal code: 980 45
- Area code: +421 47
- Vehicle registration plate (until 2022): RS
- Website: www.gemernet.sk/neporadza/

Neporadza (Hungarian: Naprágy) is a village and municipality in the Rimavská Sobota District of the Banská Bystrica Region of southern Slovakia.

== Population ==
Population statistic (10 years)
Year	1995	2005	2015	2025
Count	307	303	252	294
Difference		−1.30%	−16.83%	+16.66%

Population statistic
Year	2024	2025
Count	299	294
Difference		−1.67%

It has a population of 294 people (31 December 2025).

=== Ethnicity ===
Census 2021 (1+ %)
Ethnicity	Number	Fraction
Hungarian	229	80.06%
Slovak	55	19.23%
Romani	11	3.84%
Not found out	5	1.74%
Total	286	

In year 2021 was 286 people by ethnicity 229 as Hungarian, 55 as Slovak, 11 as Romani, 5 as Not found out and 1 as Czech.

Note on population: The difference values of population numbers in the table "Population statistic" and in the sections "Ethnicity" & "Religion" is caused by the use of various statistical methods.

=== Religion ===
Census 2021 (1+ %)
Religion	Number	Fraction
Calvinist Church	144	50.35%
Roman Catholic Church	76	26.57%
None	43	15.03%
Not found out	11	3.85%
Evangelical Church	10	3.5%
Total	286	

In year 2021 was 286 people by religion 144 from Calvinist Church, 76 from Roman Catholic Church, 43 from None, 11 from Not found out, 10 from Evangelical Church, 1 from Christian Congregations in Slovakia and 1 from Greek Catholic Church.
