= Mimi Jennewein =

American painter

Emilia "Mimi" Jennewein (1920 - December 15, 2006) was an American painter.

== Life ==
Jennewein was born in Rome, Italy, the daughter of sculptor C. Paul Jennewein. She attended Mamaroneck Junior High in Mamaroneck, New York, and later attended the Art Students League, the National Academy of Design, and Yale University, graduating in 1942 with a Bachelor's in Fine Arts in painting.

She later married James Triggs.

== Works ==
While attending Yale, Jennewein painted three in a series of eight murals depicting the life of James Fenimore Cooper at Mamaroneck High School; they were dedicated on September 15, 1941.

One of Jennewein's watercolor paintings is housed at the Smithsonian American Art Museum.
