= Tom Atter =

English footballer

Personal information
- Full name: John Tom Atter
- Date of birth: 9 May 1901
- Place of birth: Dinnington, West Riding of Yorkshire, England
- Date of death: 6 October 1958 (aged 57)
- Height: 5 ft 11 in (1.80 m)
- Position: Goalkeeper

Senior career*
Years	Team	Apps	(Gls)
1921–1923	Dinnington Main Colliery Welfare		
1923–1926	Grimsby Town	48	(0)
1926–1930	Rotherham United	108	(0)
- * Club domestic league appearances and goals

John Tom Atter (9 May 1901 – 6 October 1958) was an English professional footballer who played as a goalkeeper.
