= Henryk Grabowski (athlete) =

Polish long jumper (1929–2012)

Personal information
- Full name: Henryk Piotr Grabowski
- Nationality: Polish
- Born: 19 October 1929 Czeladź, Poland
- Died: 3 March 2012 (aged 82) Czeladź, Poland
- Height: 1.75 m (5 ft 9 in)
- Weight: 73 kg (161 lb)

Sport
- Event: Long jump
- Club: Legia Warsaw; Górnik Katowice
Medal record
Men's athletics
Representing Poland
European Championships
Bronze medal – third place	1958 Stockholm	Long jump

Henryk Piotr Grabowski (19 October 1929 – 3 March 2012) was a Polish long jumper. He competed at the 1952 and 1956 Summer Olympics.

He won the bronze medal in the long jump at the 1958 European Athletics Championships. During his career, he broke the Polish record eight times, culminating in a career best of 7.81 metres.

== International competitions ==
Year	Competition	Venue	Position	Event	Notes
Representing Poland
1952	Olympic Games	Helsinki, Finland	21st (q)	Long jump	6.77 m
1956	Olympic Games	Melbourne, Australia	10th	Long jump	7.15 m
1957	World Festival of Youth and Students	Moscow, Soviet Union	2nd	4 × 100 m relay	40.8 s
1957	World Festival of Youth and Students	Moscow, Soviet Union	1st	Long jump	7.46 m
1958	European Championships	Stockholm, Sweden	3rd	Long jump	7.51 m
