= Ralf Ginsborg =

Danish footballer

Personal information
- Date of birth: 11 April 1927
- Date of death: 2 December 2006 (aged 79)
- Position: Midfielder

Senior career*
Years	Team	Apps	(Gls)
- Hellerup IK
- * Club domestic league appearances and goals

Ralf Ginsborg (11 April 1927 – 2 December 2006) was a Danish footballer who competed in the 1952 Summer Olympics.
