= Mike Moroney =

Australian long jumper (1933–2015)

Personal information
- Full name: Michael Matthew Moroney
- Nationality: Australian
- Born: 6 December 1933 Lismore, New South Wales
- Died: 15 March 2015 (aged 81) Tamworth, New South Wales

Sport
- Sport: Athletics
- Event: Long jump

Michael Matthew Moroney (6 December 1933 – 15 March 2015) was an Australian athlete. He competed in the men's long jump at the 1956 Summer Olympics.
