= Maksymilian Więcek =

Polish ice hockey player

- Born: September 18, 1920 Baranów Sandomierski, Poland
- Died: December 28, 2006 (aged 86) Kraków, Poland
- Height: 6 ft 0 in (183 cm)
- Weight: 185 lb (84 kg; 13 st 3 lb)
- Position: Defence
- Played for: Cracovia; Legia Warsaw
- National team: Poland
- Playing career: 1947–1954

Maksymilian Więcek (18 September 1920 – 28 December 2006) was a Polish athlete. Most notably as an ice hockey player, he played for Cracovia and Legia Warsaw during his career. He won the Polish league title ten times during his career, three with Cracovia and seven with Legia. Jasiński also played for the Polish national team at the 1948 Winter Olympics. After his playing career, he studied medicine, receiving a doctorate from the Jagiellonian University Medical College in 1964.
