= B. V. Satyanarayan =

Indian sportsman (1935–2004)

Personal information
- Full name: Bondata Venkata Satyanarayan
- Nationality: Indian
- Born: 9 May 1935 Bapatla, British India
- Died: 23 April 2004 (aged 68) Jamshedpur, India

Sport
- Sport: Athletics
- Event: Long jump

Bondata Venkata Satyanarayan (9 May 1935 – 23 April 2004) was an Indian athlete. He competed in the men's long jump at the 1960 Summer Olympics and the 1964 Summer Olympics.
