= Richard Dean (model) =

American athlete, model and photographer (1956–2006)

- Born: May 15, 1956; Bethesda, Maryland, U.S.
- Died: December 27, 2006 (aged 50); New York, U.S.
- Occupation: Athlete

Richard Dean (né Cowen; May 15, 1956 – December 27, 2006) was an American athlete, model and photographer, who co-hosted Cover Shot, a television makeover show on the American cable TV network TLC.

== Early life and education ==
Dean was born Richard Cowen in Bethesda, Maryland, in 1956. He was the son of Chet and Juanita Cohen. Dean attended Winston Churchill High School in Potomac, Maryland, and the Lawrenceville School in Princeton, New Jersey. He attended the University of Delaware on a football scholarship.

== Career ==
He began working as a fashion model in the mid-1980s and later became a self-taught fashion and advertising photographer. His clients included Gianni Versace, Yves St. Laurent, Giorgio Armani, Reebok, Nike, Fujifilm, Beck's, Michelob, Fila, Playboy and TV Guide.

Dean's first appearance on a TV reality show was on UPN's America's Next Top Model. In 2006, he joined model Frederique van der Wal on TLC's Cover Shot, in which "supermoms" were transformed into "supermodels".

== Death ==
Dean died on December 27, 2006, of pancreatic cancer at Beth Israel Medical Center in New York.
