= Jun Ebina =

Japanese long jumper

Personal information
- Nationality: Japanese
- Born: 19 February 1939 (age 87)

Sport
- Sport: Athletics
- Event: Long jump

Jun Ebina (蝦名 純, Ebina Jun; born 19 February 1939) is a Japanese athlete. He competed in the men's long jump at the 1960 Summer Olympics.
