= Mahmoud Atter Abdel Fattah =

Egyptian long jumper

Personal information
- Nationality: Egyptian
- Born: 1938 Cairo, Egypt
- Died: February 11, 2018 (aged 79–80) Cairo, Egypt

Sport
- Sport: Athletics
- Event: Long jump

Mahmoud Atter Abdel Fattah (born 1938) is an Egyptian athlete. He competed in the men's long jump at the 1960 Summer Olympics.
