= Wilhelm Porrassalmi =

Finnish long jumper (1930–2006)

Personal information
- Nationality: Finnish
- Born: 18 December 1930
- Died: 21 November 2006 (aged 75)

Sport
- Sport: Athletics
- Event: Long jump

Wilhelm Porrassalmi (18 December 1930 – 21 December 2006) was a Finnish athlete. He competed in the men's long jump at the 1956 Summer Olympics.
