= Köppen Point =

Köppen Point (54°30′S 36°2′W) is a point marking the northeast side of the entrance to Moltke Harbor in Royal Bay, South Georgia.

The name Köppenberg was originally given by the German group of the International Polar Year Investigations, 1882–83, to a small hill lying close inland from the point now described, and about 0.5 nautical miles (1 km) east of the German base. It was named for Professor Wladimir Köppen, a noted meteorologist and climatologist, who had recommended the establishment of a high level observatory near the base. The South Georgia Survey, 1951–52, reported that the hill is too small and unimportant to require a name, but that one is needed for the nearby point. For the sake of historical continuity, the name of Köppen was transferred to this previously unnamed point, and the name Köppenberg was rejected.
