= Yukishige Yasuma =

Japanese long jumper

Personal information
- Nationality: Japanese
- Born: 25 March 1938 (age 88)

Sport
- Sport: Athletics
- Event: Long jump

Yukishige Yasuma (安間 之重, Yasuma Yukishige; born 25 March 1938) is a Japanese athlete. He competed in the men's long jump at the 1960 Summer Olympics.
