= Christian Collardot =

French long jumper

Christian Collardot (5 July 1933 – 12 June 2011) was a French long jumper who competed in the 1960 Summer Olympics.
