= Karl McDade =

American football player

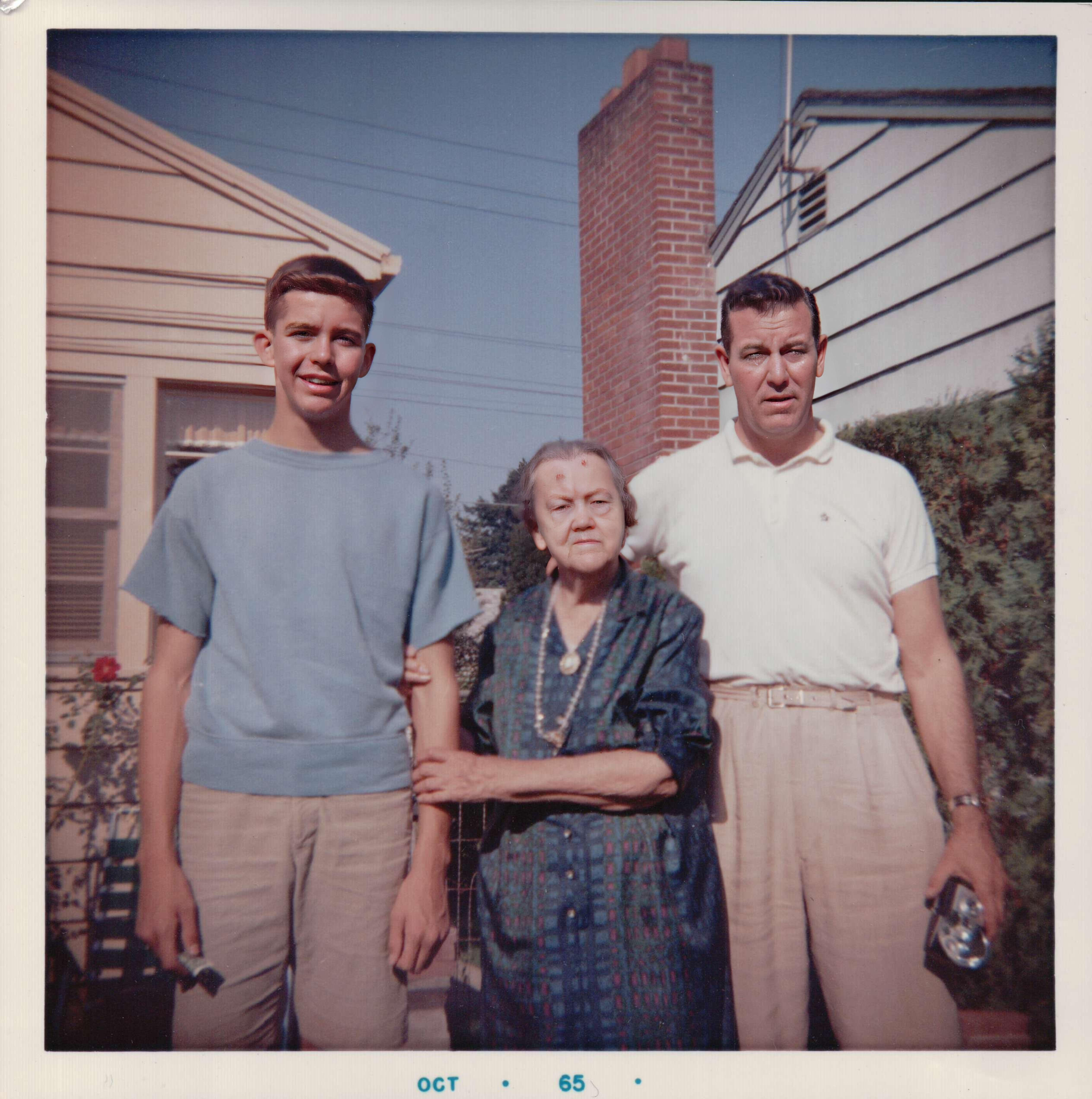
- Karl McDade (right) with son (left) and mother (center) in 1965

No. 22
- Position: Center / linebacker

Personal information
- Born: March 27, 1915; Madras, Oregon, U.S.
- Died: December 6, 2006; Portland, Oregon
- Listed height: 6 ft 3 in (1.91 m)
- Listed weight: 195 lb (88 kg)

Career information
- High school: Grant High School (Portland, Oregon)
- College: Portland (1934–1937)

Career history
- Chicago Cardinals (1938)*; Pittsburgh Pirates (1938)
- * Offseason or practice squad member only
- Stats at Pro Football Reference

Karl McDade (March 27, 1915 – December 6, 2006) was an American professional football center and linebacker who played for the Pittsburgh Pirates of the National Football League (NFL) for one season in 1938.

== Early life ==
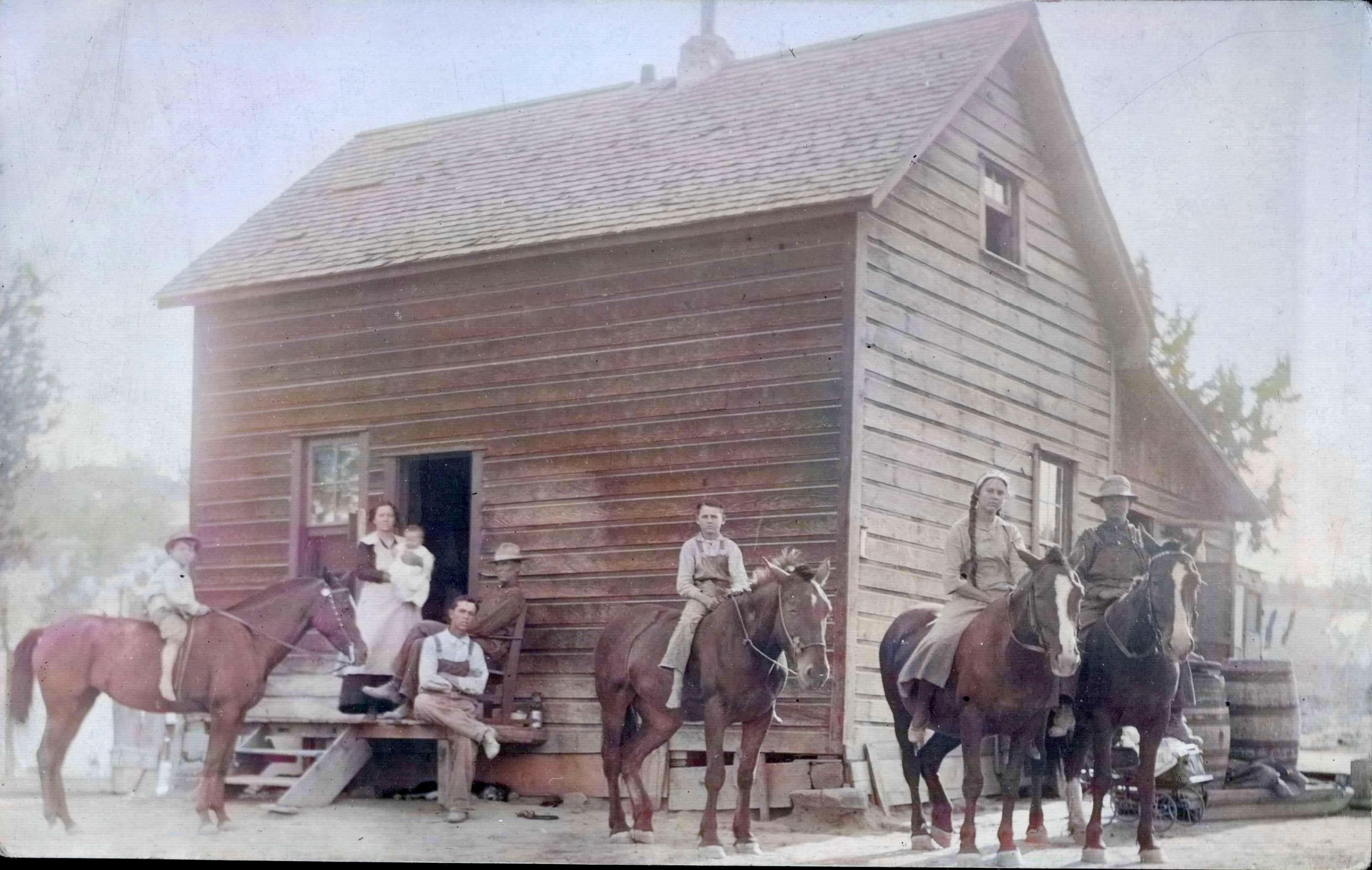
McDade Family photograph in Madras, Oregon with Adeline Elizabeth McDade holding Karl McDade as a baby.

McDade was born on March 27, 1915, in Madras, Oregon, the youngest of seven children to Daniel Martin McDade Sr. and Adeline Elizabeth Vautrain. McDade grew up with five siblings because the firstborn, Paul Morris McDade, died at about one year old in 1896 in Aspen, Colorado.

By 1920, McDade was living in Edgar, Nebraska with his mother and sister, while his father and four brothers lived in Portland, Oregon during this time.

At age 14, McDade, his mom, Adeline, sister, Twila, and brother, Val, lived in Northeast Portland, Oregon. Residing in this location, McDade attended high school and played football at Grant High School.

== College career ==
After graduating high school, McDade continued his education at the University of Portland, and played football under Coach Gene Murphy from 1934 to 1937. He became starting center in 1934 and was considered among the best at his position in the area, with The Oregon Daily Journal noting him to be "just about as consistent a center as there is on the Pacific Coast today." In 1993, well after his football playing days, McDade was inducted into the University of Portland Hall of Fame.

== Professional career ==
Following his college career, McDade signed to play professional football with the Chicago Cardinals of the National Football League (NFL), being one of the first three Portland alumni to ever sign into the NFL. He was traded to the Pittsburgh Pirates in September, before having appeared in a game for the Cardinals. With the Steelers, he played in six games and started in one under head coach Johnny Blood, with Walt Kiesling as assistant coach, and alongside the exciting Byron "Whizzer" White. He was released by the Pirates in October 1938.

== World War II ==
Before McDade enlisted in the United States Navy on September 26, 1942 for World War II, he married his wife Ruth Lillian Morris on September 19, 1942, and remained married for 64 years.

After entering the Navy, on March 25, 1943, McDade was transferred from the Puget Sound Naval Shipyard in Bremerton, Washington to the Naval Station Treasure Island on Treasure Island in San Francisco Bay for additional instruction.

McDade received training at the Logan Naval Training Station for Electrical Engineering & Radio Material School in Logan, Utah, before being transferred to the Naval Air Technical Training Center Ward Island, offshore from Corpus Christi, Texas, on August 20, 1943. McDade also served some of his time in the Navy in the Aleutian Islands.

Before the end of his service in the Navy, McDade achieved the rank of Lieutenant Junior Grade (LTJG) on December 1, 1944.
