= Abdul Sattar Abdul Razzak =

Iraqi athletics competitor

Personal information
- Nationality: Iraqi
- Born: 1932 (age 92–93) Baghdad, Iraq
- Height: 1.78 m (5 ft 10 in)
- Weight: 70 kg (150 lb)

Sport
- Sport: Athletics
- Event(s): Triple jump Long jump

Abdul Sattar Abdul Razzak (born 1932) is an Iraqi triple jumper and long jumper. He competed in the 1960 Summer Olympics.

== 1960 Summer Olympic Statistics ==
Overall Results
Games	Event	Team	Rank
1960 Summer	Men's Long Jump	Iraq	46 QR
1960 Summer	Men's Long Jump	Iraq	32 QR

Men's Long Jump (Group A)
Games	Phase	Unit	Rank	D	BMD
1960 Summer	Qualifying		46	6.37	
1960 Summer	Qualifying	Group A	17	6.37	
1960 Summer	Qualifying	Group A Round One	NP	foul	
1960 Summer	Qualifying	Group A Round Two	17	6.37	6.37
1960 Summer	Qualifying	Group A Round Three	NP	6.37	

Men's Long Jump (Group C)
Games	Phase	Unit	Rank	D	BMD
1960 Summer	Qualifying		32	14.56	
1960 Summer	Qualifying	Group C	10	14.56	
1960 Summer	Qualifying	Group C Round One	8	14.08	
1960 Summer	Qualifying	Group C Round Two	10	14.56	14.56
1960 Summer	Qualifying	Group C Round Three	NP	14.27	
