= Manfred Molzberger =

German long jumper

Manfred Molzberger (27 January 1936 in Gummersbach – 1 March 2003 in Gummersbach) was a German long jumper who competed in the 1960 Summer Olympics.
