= Fritz Köppen =

German long jumper (1935–2022)

Fritz Köppen (28 June 1935 – 18 September 2022) was a German long jumper who competed in the 1960 Summer Olympics. He was born in Charlottenburg.
