= Attershisha =

Atter Shisha
- Union Council and Town
- Country: Pakistan
- Region: Khyber-Pakhtunkhwa
- District: Mansehra District

Government
  - Leader: Muhammad Irfan(Gen secretary Hazara Motor Union)
  - cast: Pathan, Awan, Syed.
- Time zone: UTC+5 (PST)
- GOV- post office atter-shisha: 21260

Atter Shisha is a village and union council in Mansehra District, Khyber Pakhtunkhwa province, Pakistan. It is situated on the New Naran Highway, 12 kilometres (7.5 mi) from the city of Mansehra.

== Health ==
The area contain one basic health unit (BHU), - these play a key role in providing healthcare to the public in Pakistan.

In August 2021 schools in Attershisha were shut down for ten days after a sudden rise in cases of coronavirus.

== Politics ==
Since 2023 Attershisha has been part of the PK-36, Mansehra-I political constituency.

== Historical background ==
The name of this village, Atter Shisha (i.e. lit. 'Bottle of Attar Scent), originated, according to a charming local legend, when the Mughal Queen Nur Jahan was passing by en route to Kashmir and stopping at this location during her short stay, dropping an expensive and beautiful perfume bottle here; and henceforth, this place was named after this bottle.

== Population and people ==
The Common dress of the people is Shalwar Qamiz, although government officials and students also wear trousers and coats. Turbans, Karakul caps and 'Patti' caps are worn by the people. Men often wear waistcoats over Shalwar Qamiz. Women's dresses are also very simple and consist of Shalwar Qamiz, with Dopatta or Chadder scarves as head-covering.

The food of inhabitants of the Town is very simple. Maize, wheat and rice are eaten everywhere. Home-made Ghee and Lassi are also consumed by the rural folk.

Large majority of the population more than 60% depends upon agriculture for their subsistence. However, income from agriculture is too meagre to support the population. As a result, many of them have found work in other parts of the country or left for overseas. Other minor professions to which people have taken to, include those of cobblers, blacksmiths, goldsmiths, weavers, barbers, labourers etc.

The area was affected during the 2005 earthquake in Kashmir and the Hazara region.
