= Dmytro Bondarenko =

Ukrainian long jumper

Personal information
- Nationality: Ukrainian
- Born: 9 August 1936 (age 89) Sumy Oblast, Ukrainian SSR

Sport
- Sport: Athletics
- Event: Long jump

Dmytro Bondarenko (born 9 August 1936) is a Ukrainian athlete. He competed in the men's long jump at the 1956 Summer Olympics and the 1960 Summer Olympics, representing the Soviet Union.
