= Torgny Wåhlander =

Swedish long jumper

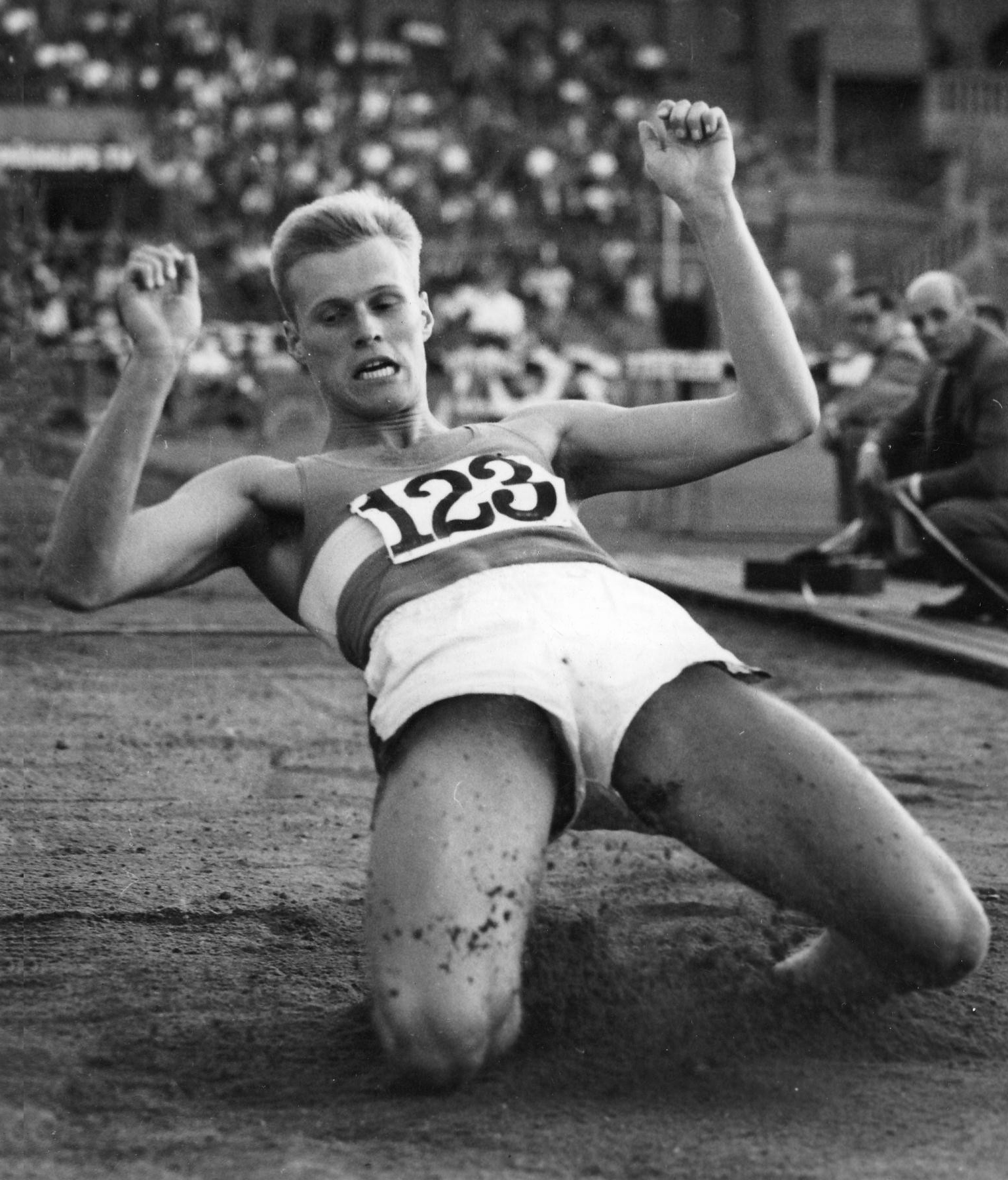

Personal information
- Born: 15 November 1935 (age 90) Stockholm, Sweden

Sport
- Sport: Athletics
- Event: Long jump
- Club: Turebergs IF, Sollentuna

Achievements and titles
- Personal best: 7.66 m (1960)

Torgny Georg Erik Otto Wåhlander (born 15 November 1935) is a retired Swedish long jumper who competed at the 1956 Summer Olympics. He won the national title in 1955, 1956, 1958–60 and 1962, setting a national record in 1960.
