= Jorma Valkama =

Finnish long jumper

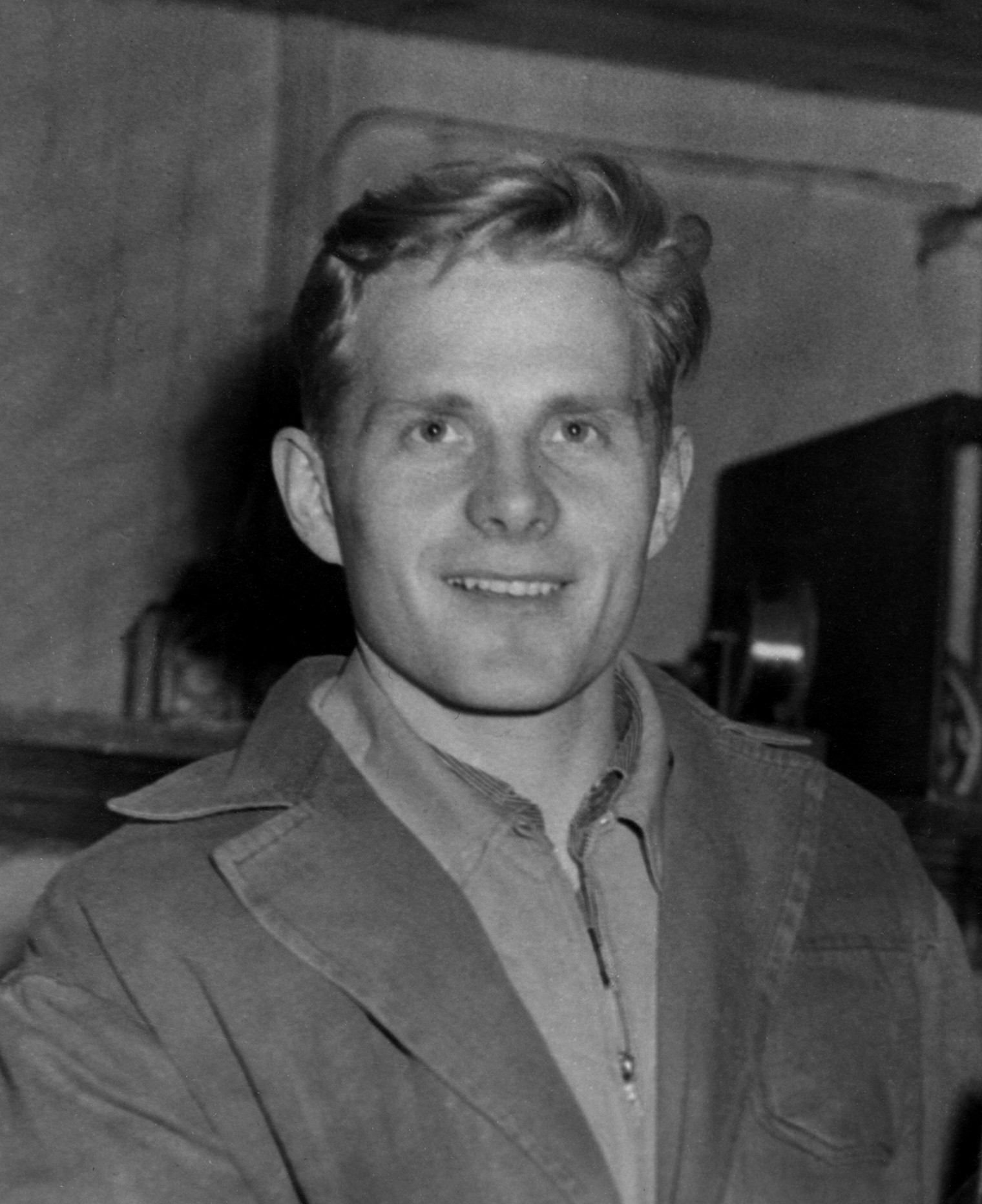
- Jorma Valkama in 1950

Personal information
- Nationality: Finnish
- Born: 4 October 1928 Viipuri, Finland
- Died: 11 December 1962 (aged 34)
- Height: 172 cm (5 ft 8 in)
- Weight: 66 kg (146 lb)

Sport
- Sport: Athletics
- Event: long jump
- Club: Lauttasaaren Pyrintö

Jorma Rainer Valkama (4 October 1928 – 11 December 1962) was a Finnish athlete who competed mainly in the long jump and participated at three Olympic Games.

== Biography ==
Valkama competed for Finland in the 1956 Summer Olympics held in Melbourne, Australia, in the long jump where he won the bronze medal.

Valkama won the British AAA Championships title at the 1962 AAA Championships.

Valkama died in a car accident at age 34, the same year that he won the Finnkampen.
