= Lava Kusa =

Lava Kusa or variants may also refer to:

- Lava (Ramayana) and Kusha (Ramayana), characters in the Indian epic
- Lava Kusa, a 1934 Indian Telugu-language film
- Lava Kusa, a 1963 Indian Telugu-language film
- Lav Kush, a 1997 Indian film
- Lava Kusha, a 2007 Indian film
- Lava Kusa: The Warrior Twins, a 2011 Indian animated film
- Lava Kusa, a 2015 Indian film
- Lavakusha, a 2017 Indian Malayalam-language film
- Luv Kush, an Indian mythological TV series
- Luv-Kush equation, an Indian political term
- Ram Siya Ke Luv Kush, an Indian mythological TV series
- Luv Kush Indoor Stadium, Rajasthan, India

== See also ==
- Lava (disambiguation)
- Lav (disambiguation)
- Luv (disambiguation)
- Kusa (disambiguation)
- Kusha (disambiguation)
- Lavkushnagar, town in Madhya Pradesh, India
