= Gözleme =

Turkish savory flatbread

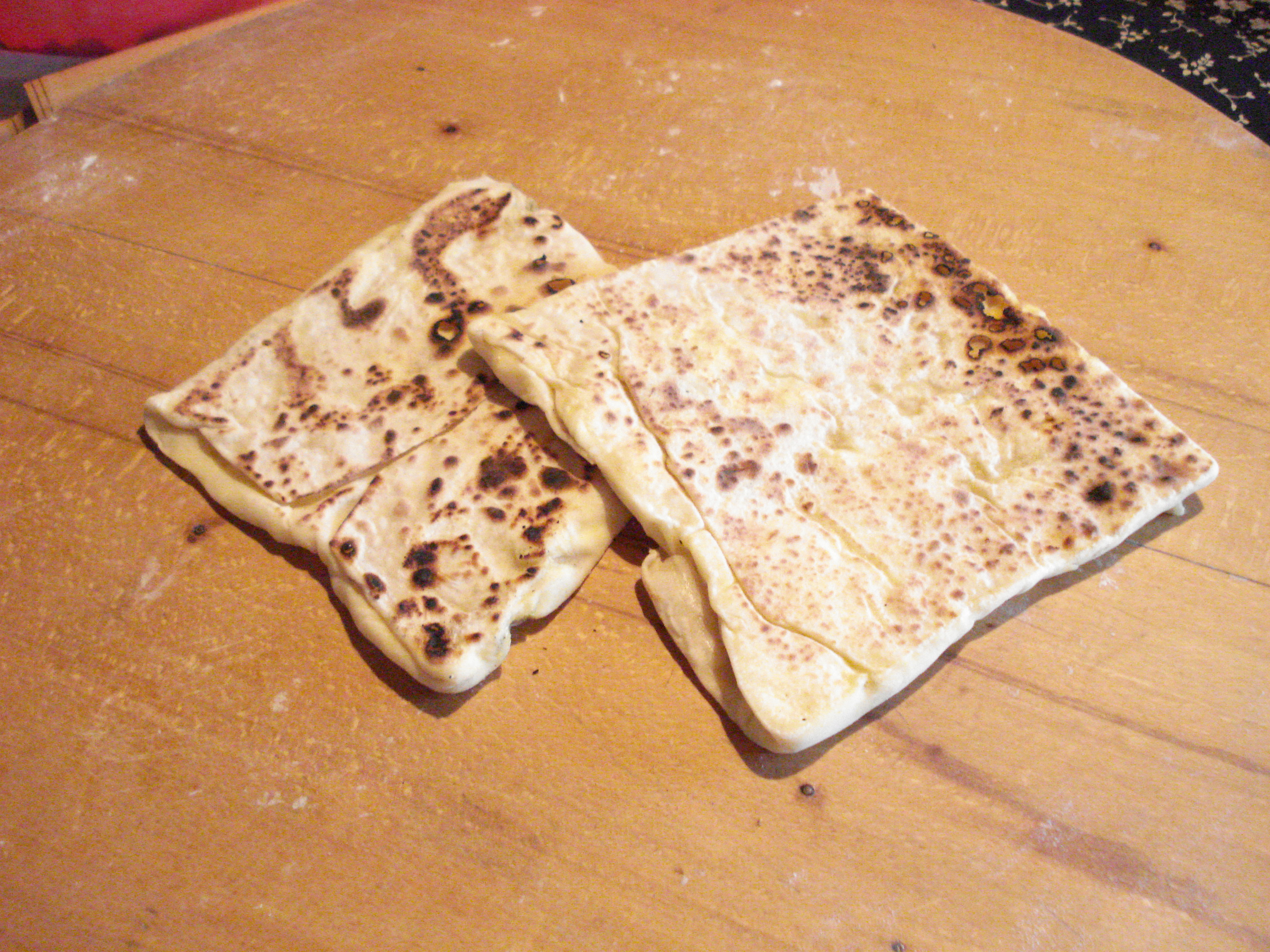
- Type: Flatbread
- Place of origin: Turkey

Gözleme is a savory Turkish stuffed turnover. The dough is usually unleavened, and made only with flour, salt and water, but gözleme can be made from yeast dough as well. It is similar to bazlama, but is lightly brushed with butter or oil, whereas bazlama is prepared without fat. The dough is rolled thin, then filled with various toppings, sealed, and cooked over a griddle. Gözleme may sometimes be made from prepackaged hand-rolled leaves of yufka dough.

Fillings for gözleme are numerous and vary by region and personal preference, and include a variety of meats (minced beef, chopped lamb, fresh or smoked seafood, sujuk, pastirma), vegetables (spinach, zucchini, eggplant, leek, chard, various peppers, onion, scallion, shallot, garlic), mushrooms (porcino, chanterelle, truffle), tubers (potatoes, yams, radish), cheeses (feta, Turkish white cheese (beyaz peynir), lavaş, çökelek, kasseri, and kashkaval), as well as eggs, seasonal herbs, and spices.

== Etymology ==
The word gözleme is derived from the Turkish word közleme, meaning "to grill/cook on the embers". This word can ultimately be traced back to Turkish word köz, meaning "ember". The Ottoman Turkish alphabet had no distinction between k and g sounds, so it is unclear when the consonantal shift from köz to göz happened. The oldest record of the word in a Turkic language is dated back to 1477. It is first attested in Persian-Turkish dictionary Lügat-i Halîmî and also found in Evliya Çelebi's Seyahatnâme.

== History ==
Jews avoided clarified butter, since by the rules of kashrut butter cannot be eaten at the same meal as meat, so bakers who made gözleme for them used sesame oil instead.

== Images ==
Gözleme

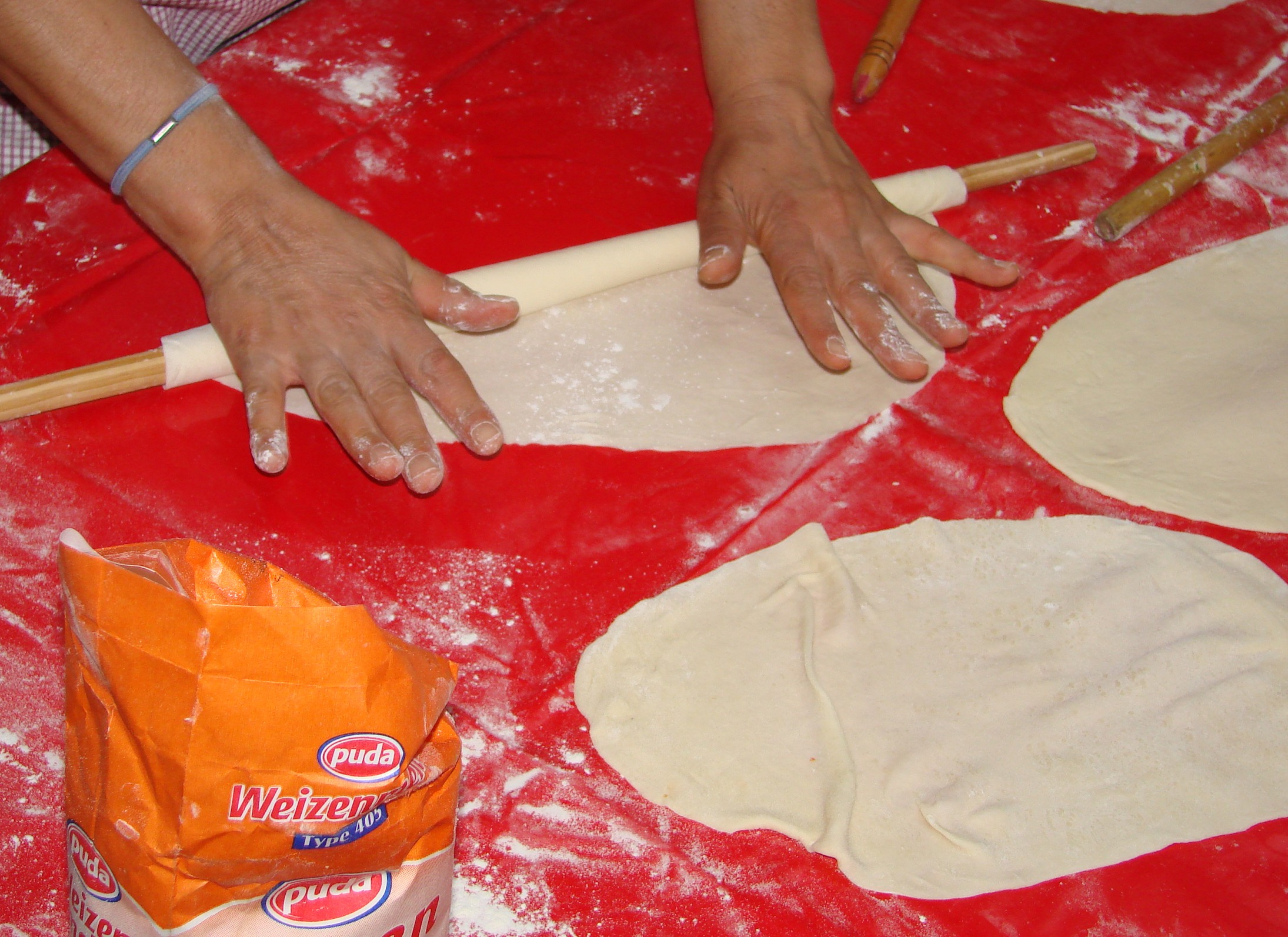
Rolling out the dough

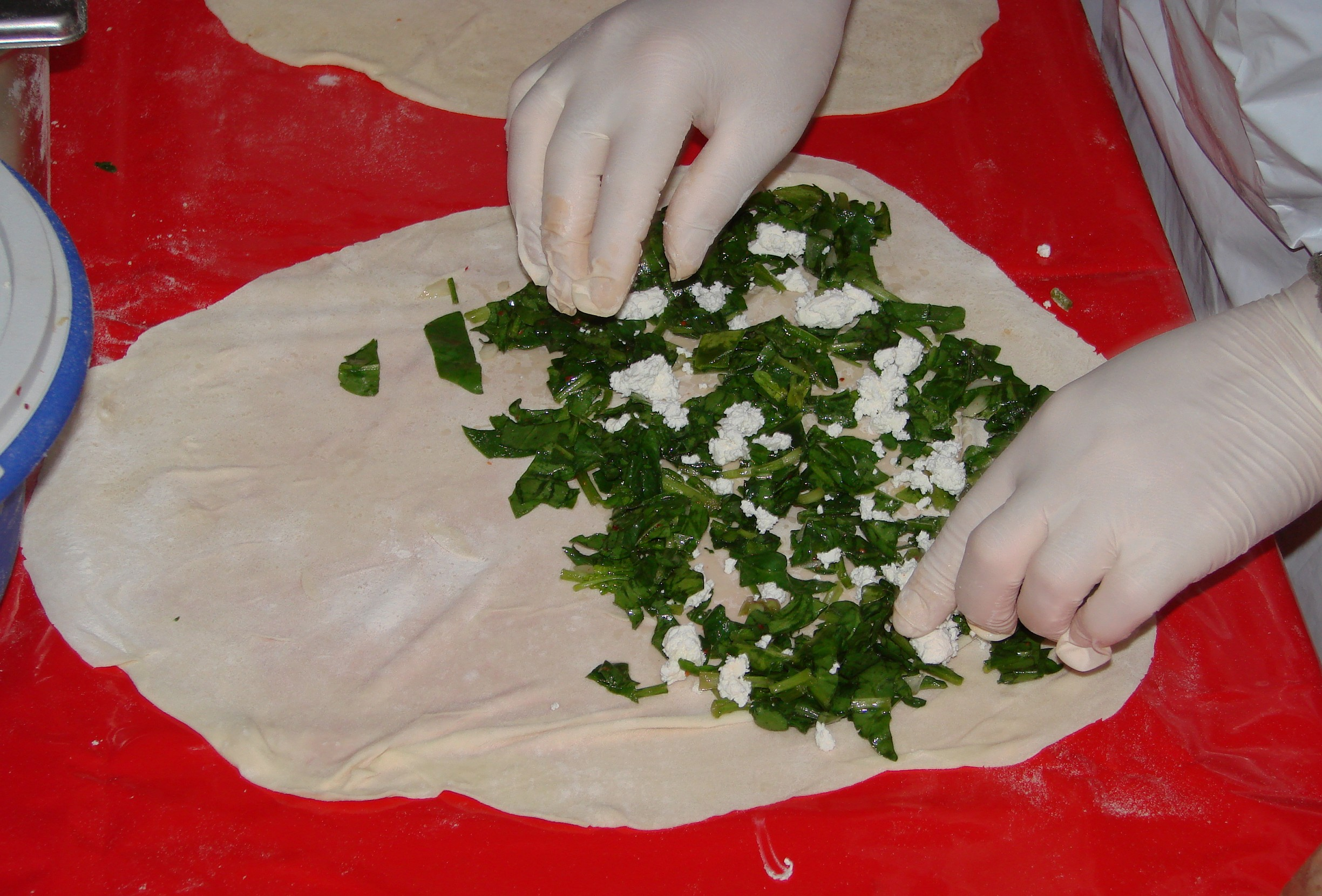
A simple example of a popular preparation of gözleme with spinach, parsley, and Turkish white cheese.

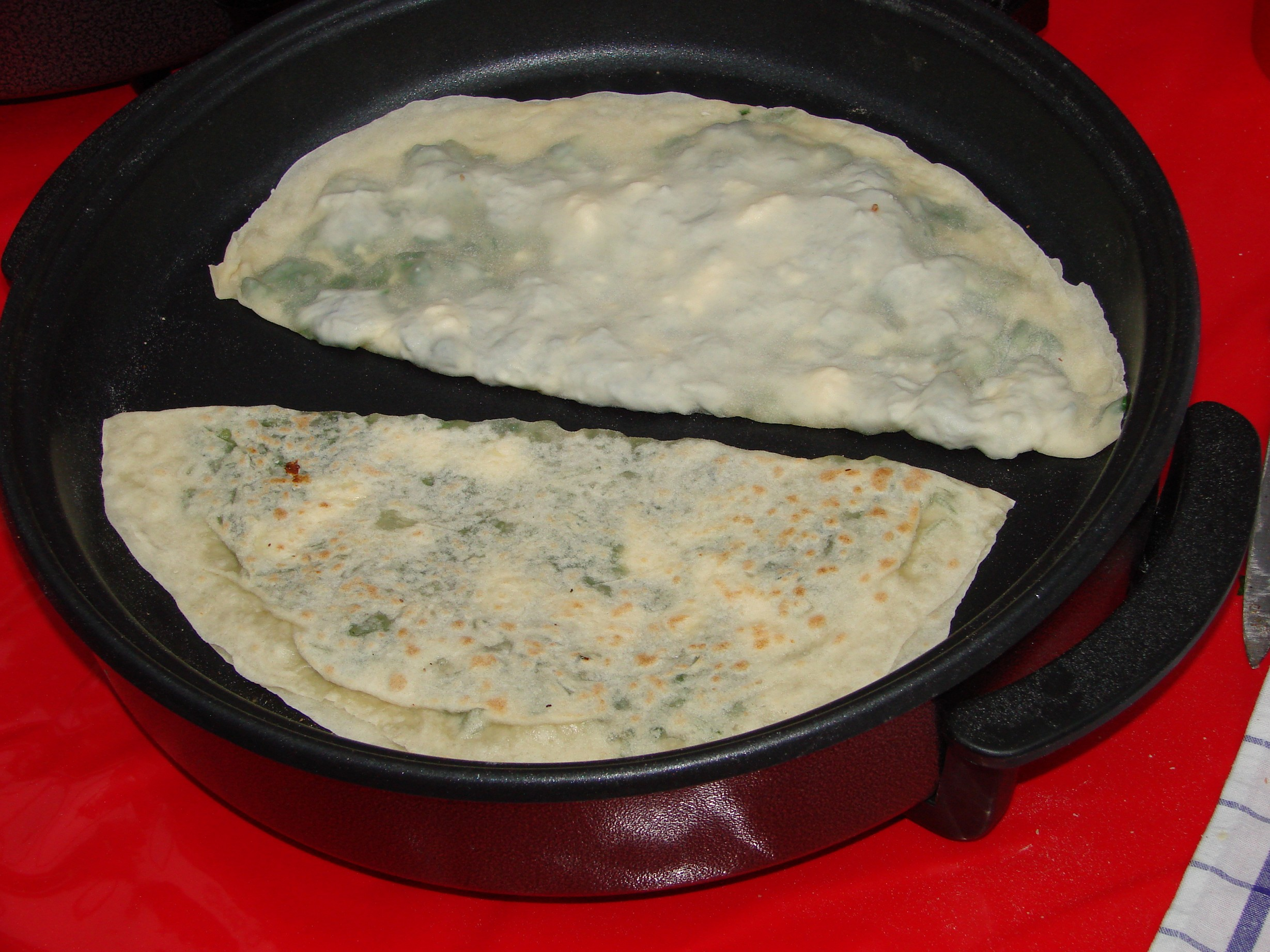
The filled and sealed pastries being cooked over a sac griddle until they become golden brown.

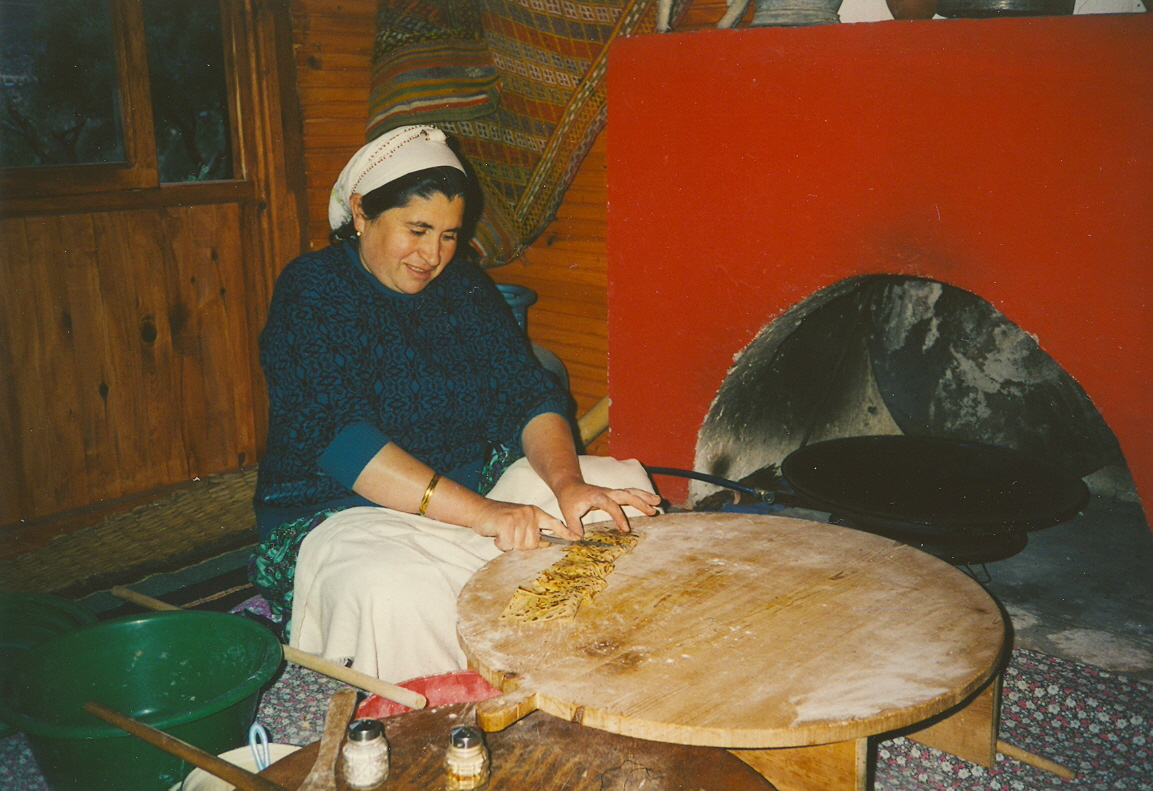
Traditional tableside preparation of gözleme in a restaurant near Antalya. A gas-powered sac griddle can be seen inside the red oven to the right, with two thin wooden rolling pins ("oklava") and pastry brushes used to prepare the dough to the lower left. The cook is seen cutting up the finished gözleme on her pastry board table to prepare for final serving.

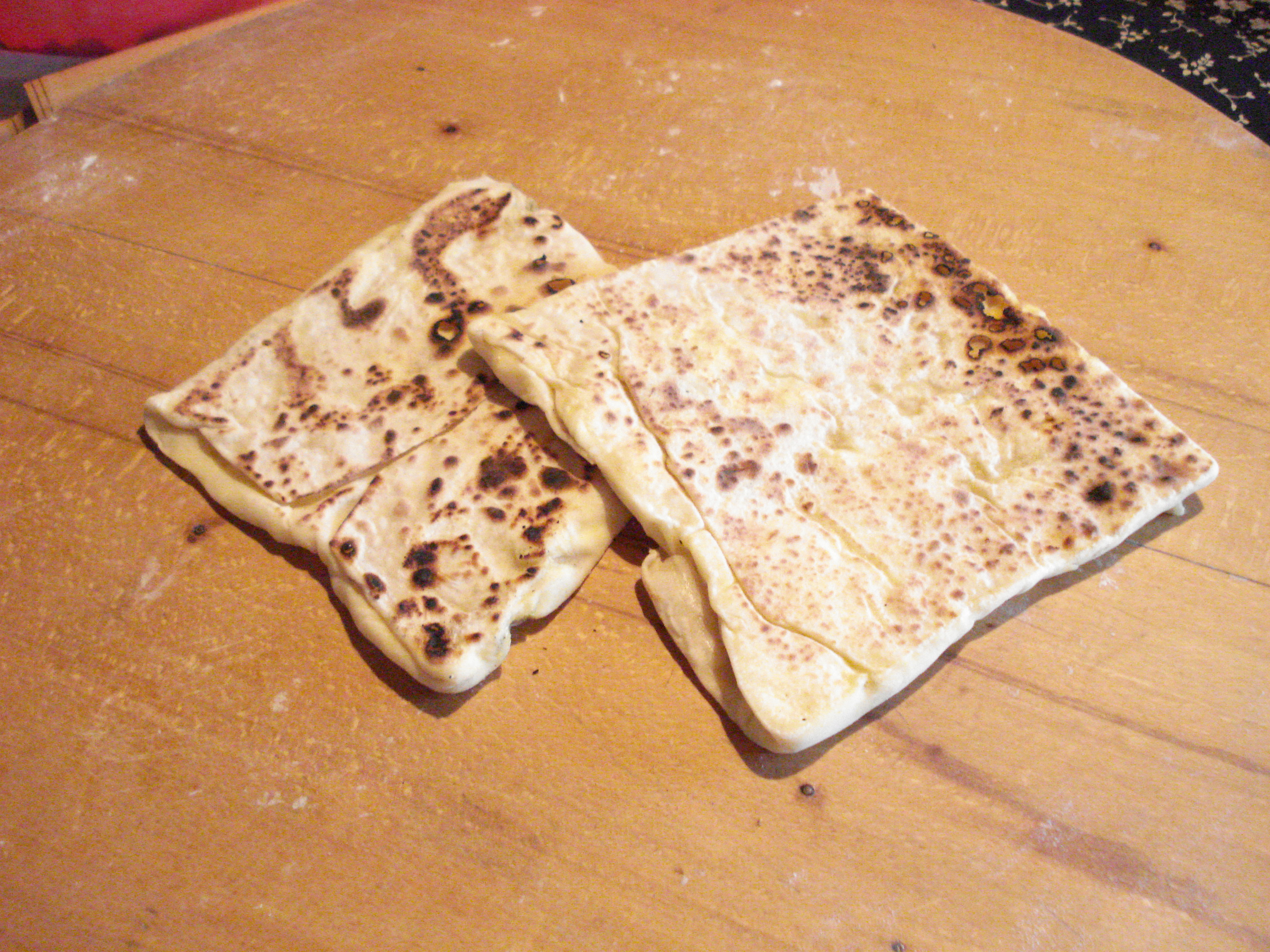
Finished pieces of gözleme resting flat on a table prior to being served.

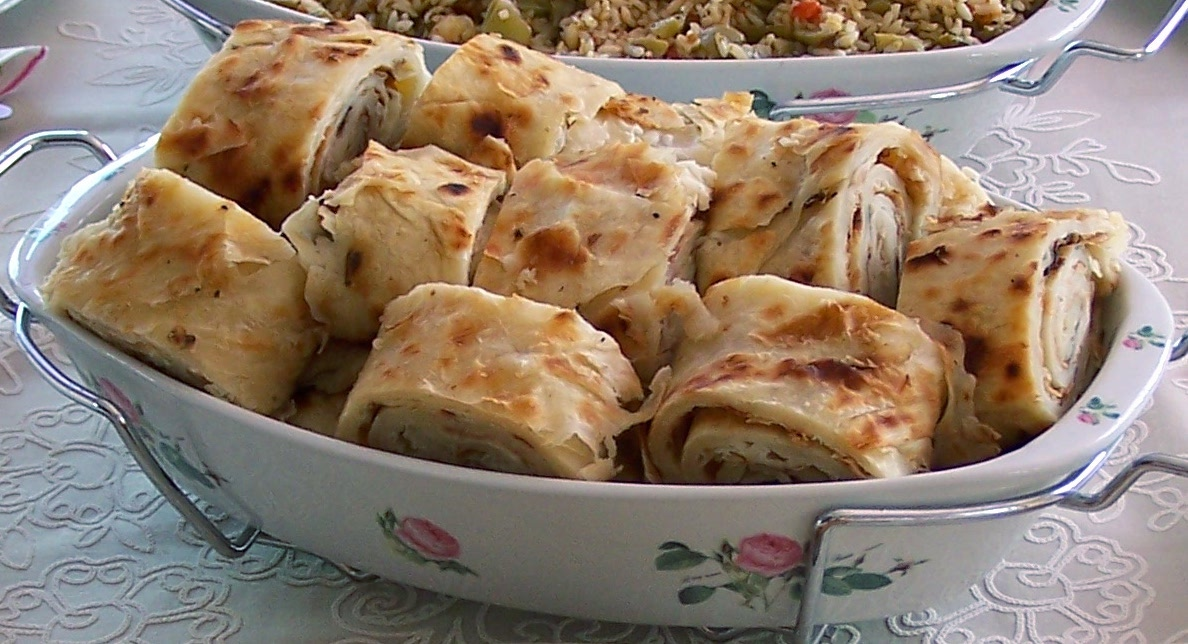
Gözleme can be served flat on a plate with additional toppings, rolled up into a wrap, or cut into smaller mini-rolls, as depicted in this picture.

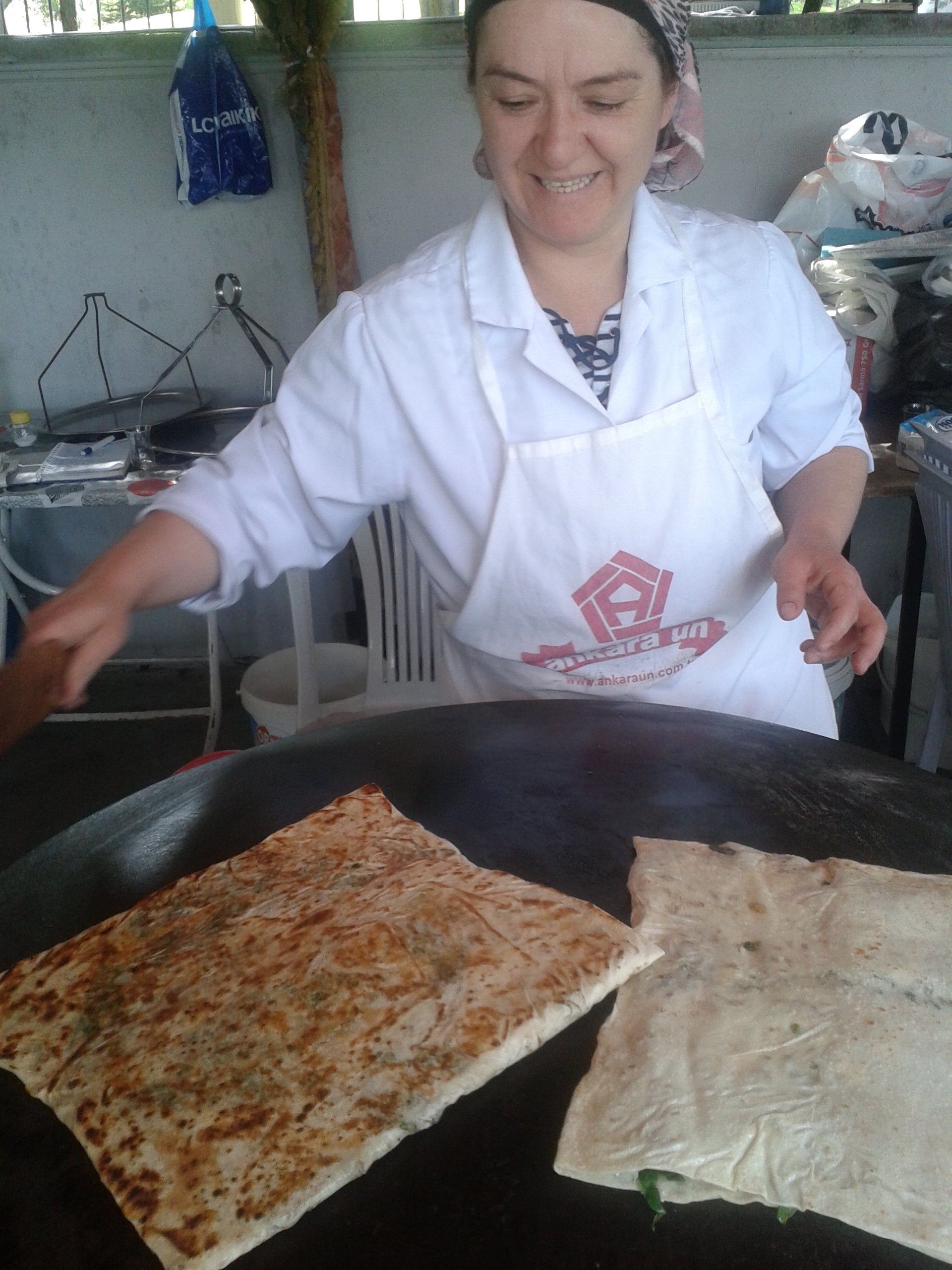
Making Gözleme in Ankara: the pastry is made in different forms.

== See also ==
- Bolani
- Zhingyalov hats
- Çiberek
- Murtabak
- Paratha
- Qistibi
- Qutab
