= CUS =

CUS may refer to:

- Cambridge Union Society
- Canadian Union of Students
- Critical university studies
- Catholic University School
- Chicago Union Station
- Commonwealth of Unrecognized States
- Concordia University System
- Confederation of Labour Unification (Spanish: Confederación de Unificación Sindical) in Nicaragua
- Constitution of the United States
- Copper monosulfide (CuS)
- Urban Community of Strasbourg (French: Communauté urbaine de Strasbourg)
- "C.U.S.", a song by Norther
- Cus D'Amato, American boxing manager and trainer who handled the careers of Mike Tyson, Floyd Patterson, and José Torres
- Centro Universitario Sportivo, Italian sport governing body (at university level). Locally version, in the various cities, of Centro Universitario Sportivo Italiano (for example CUS Rome, Cus Milan...)
- Custom House station, London, England (National Rail station code)
- Computer user satisfaction

== See also ==
- Cuss (disambiguation)
- Kus (disambiguation)
