= Kus (disambiguation) =

Kus or KUS may refer to:

- Kus, a Persian musical instrument
- Kus (god), of herdsmen in Sumerian, Babylonian, and Akkadian mythology
- De kus (film), 2004 Dutch film
- Kusasi language (ISO 639 language code kus)

== Places ==
- Cusae
- Kus, Bërzhitë, Tirana municipality, Albania
- Kus, Kashar, Tirana municipality, Albania
- Lake Kuş, Turkey
- Kulusuk Airport (ICAO airport code KUS), Greenland

== See also ==
- Kuş
- Kuś
- Kûs
- Kusa (disambiguation)
- CUS (disambiguation)
