= Lavatory =

Lavatory, Lav, or Lavvy may refer to:

- Toilet, the plumbing fixture
- Toilet (room), containing a toilet
- Public toilet
- Aircraft lavatory, the public toilet on an aircraft
- Latrine, a rudimentary toilet
- A lavatorium, the washing facility in a monastery or other ecclesiastical setting
- A sink
- A washstand

== See also ==
- Lav (disambiguation)
