= Lavan =

Lavan may refer to:

== Places ==
- Lavan Island, Iran
  - Lavan Airport
- Lavan Rural District, Iran

== Other uses ==
- Lavan (name)
- Lavan or Laban (Bible), a person in the Book of Genesis
- Lavan Paavain, a special festival of harvesting in the Mithila region of the Indian subcontinent

== See also ==
- Isaac ben Jacob ha-Lavan
- Lavans (disambiguation)
- Lawan (disambiguation)
- Laban (disambiguation)
- Lava (disambiguation)
