= Lavas =

Lavas may refer to

- Lava
- Lavaş (lavash) flatbread
- Lavaş cheese produced in Turkey
- Manne Lavås (born 1944), Swedish speed skater

== See also ==
- Lava (disambiguation)
