= Lava (disambiguation) =

Lava is molten volcanic rock or the resulting solid rock after cooling.

Lava or LAVA also refer to:

== Films ==
- Lava (1980 film), an Indian Malayalam action drama
- Lava (1985 film), an Indian Hindi drama
- Lava (2001 film), a British comedy
- Lava (2014 film), a Pixar short

== Music ==
- Lava Records, an American record label
- Lava (band), a Norwegian band
- "Lava", a song from the album Filth Pig by American band Ministry
- "Lava", a song from the album Silver Sun by Silver Sun

== People ==
- Lava (Ramayana), one of the sons of Rama and Sita, in Hindu religious scripture
- William Lava (1911–1971), American composer

== Places ==
- Lava, West Bengal, a town in Darjeeling, India
- Lava Lake (British Columbia), in British Columbia, Canada
- Lava Lake (Oregon), in Oregon, US
- Lava (river), a coastal stream in Corse-du-Sud, France
- Lava, Russia, a rural locality (a selo) in Sursky District of Ulyanovsk Oblast, Russia
- Lava, Russian name of Łyna River which flows through Poland and Russia

== Other uses ==
- Lava International (stylized LΛVΛ), an Indian multinational technology company
- Benny Lava, a soramimi spoof of the song "Kalloori Vaanil" from the 2000 Tamil film Pennin Manathai Thottu
- lava, cavalry tactics utilised by Cossacks and by the Imperial Russian Army
- Lava (color), a shade of red, named after the color of volcanic lava
- Lava International, an Indian electronics-manufacturer
- Lava (soap), a hand-cleaner
- Lava, a lava-skinned Symbiote appearing in Venom: The Last Dance (2024)
- Lava shearwater, extinct seabird from the Canary Islands
- LAVA (magazine), a triathlon periodical
- Lava, former name of the UK music-television channel Greatest Hits TV
- Linaro Automated Validation
- Laboratory for Visionary Architecture
- Lesser Antilles Volcanic Arc, a chain of volcanoes and volcanic islands in the eastern Caribbean
- Lava steatite, one of the names of soapstone
- Lava cake, another name of molten chocolate cake

== See also ==
- Hot lava (game)
- Lava flow (programming)
- Lava lake
- Lava lamp
- Lava Treasure
- Lavalava
- Laava (disambiguation)
- Lavan (disambiguation)
- Larva (disambiguation)
- Lavas (disambiguation)
- Lawa (disambiguation)
- Lavo (disambiguation)
- Lav (disambiguation)
- Luv (disambiguation)
- Lava Kusa (disambiguation)
