= Lopburi (disambiguation) =

Lopburi or Lop Buri may refer to:

- Lopburi or Lavapura, city in Lopburi Province, Thailand
- Lopburi Province, province of central Thailand
  - Mueang Lopburi district
- Lopburi River, river in Thailand

== See also ==
- Lavo (disambiguation)
- Lavapuri, conjectured name of Lahore, Pakistan
- Lavapur Narayan, village in Bihar, India
