= Kuş =

Kuş is a Turkish word meaning "bird". It may refer to:

== People ==
- Armağan Kuş (born 1992), Turkish footballer
- Emrah Kuş (born 1988), Turkish Greco-Roman wrestler
- Kübra Kuş (born 1994), Turkish female water polo player
- Nafia Kuş (born 1995), Turkish female taekwondo practitioner

== Places ==
- Kuş Island, a small island within Lake Van
- Kuşadası, a district of Aydın Province in Turkey
- Lake Kuş, a lake in western Turkey

== Motif ==
- Kuş, the bird Kilim motif, symbolising luck and happiness

== See also ==
- Kus (disambiguation)
