= Kusha (disambiguation) =

Kusha is a mythological king of the Lunar dynasty in Hinduism.

Kusha may also refer to:

- Kusha (Ramayana), one of the twin sons, along with Lava, of Rama and Sita in the ancient Indian epic Ramayana
- Project Kusha, an Indian long-range surface-to air missile
- Kusha-shū (Buddhism), one of six schools of Japanese Buddhism in the Nara period
- Desmostachya bipinnata (Kusha), a tall tufted perennial grass
- Kucha (woreda) in Ethiopia, sometimes transliterated as "Kusha"
- Ab Bid-e Kusha, a village in Hormozgan Province, Iran
- Chasbaz-e Kusha, a village in Hormozgan Province, Iran
- "Kusha Las Payas", a 2003 song performed by the Andalusian-Spanish pop group Las Ketchup

== See also ==
- Kusa (disambiguation)
- Kush (disambiguation)
- Lava Kusa (disambiguation)
