= Laban =

Laban may refer to:

== Places ==
- Laban-e Olya, a village in Iran
- Laban-e Sofla, a village in Iran
- Laban, Virginia, an unincorporated community in the United States
- 8539 Laban, main-belt asteroid

== People ==
=== Surname ===
- Ahmad Abu Laban (1946–2007), Danish imam
- Arthur Laban Bates (1859–1934), American politician and representative for Pennsylvania
- Jacob Laban (born 2004), Samoan rugby league footballer
- Joseph Laban (c. 1981–2021), Filipino journalist and filmmaker
- Josh Laban (born 1982), Olympic swimmer for U.S. Virgin Islands
- Ken Laban (born 1957), New Zealand rugby league footballer, broadcaster, and politician
- Maurice Laban (1914–1956), founding member of the Algerian Communist Party
- Olivier Laban-Mattei (born 1977), French documentary photographer
- Rudolf von Laban (1879–1958), dancer and dance theorist who devised Laban Movement Analysis
- Terry LaBan (born 1961), American cartoonist
- Theodore H. Laban (1914–1978), American World War II airman
- Vincent Laban (born 1984), French footballer
- Winnie Laban (born 1955), New Zealand politician

=== Forename ===
- Laban (Bible), a figure in the Book of Genesis
- Laban (Book of Mormon), a figure in the Book of Mormon
- Charles Laban Abernethy (1872–1955), American politician and congressman for North Carolina
- Laban Ainsworth (1757–1858), American pastor
- Laban Chege (born 1969), Kenyan long-distance runner
- Laban Coblentz (born 1961), American writer and entrepreneur
- Laban Jackson (born 1943), American businessman
- Laban Kagika (born 1978), Kenyan marathon runner
- Laban Moiben (born 1983), Kenyan marathon runner
- Laban T. Moore (1829–1892), American politician and representative for Kentucky
- Laban Lacy Rice (1870–1973), American educator and author
- Laban Rotich (born 1969), Kenyan 1500 metres runner
- Laban Wheaton (1754–1846), American politician and representative for Massachusetts

== Politics ==
- Laban ng Demokratikong Pilipino (LDP; Struggle of Democratic Filipinos), a political party in the Philippines formerly abbreviated as "Laban" in 1990s
- Lakas ng Bayan (People's Power), a former political party in the Philippines that was known by the acronym, LABAN (meaning "Fight")
- Laban sign, a Filipino hand gesture

== Other uses ==
- Laban (band), a 1980s Eurodance duo
- Leben (milk product), buttermilk commonly referred to as laban in the Arabian Peninsula
- Yogurt in Levantine and Iraqi Arabic
- Laban Movement Analysis, a system for describing movement

== See also ==
- Lavan (disambiguation)
- Lilla spöket Laban (The Little Ghost Godfrey), a Swedish children's book character
- Trinity Laban Conservatoire of Music and Dance, a college in southeast London named after Rudolf Laban
