= Lawan =

Lawan may refer to:

- Lawan, Dausa, a village and tehsil on State Highway 2 in Dausa, Rajasthan, India
- Lawan, Mahendergarh, a village in Haryana, India
- Lawan, Nepal, a village development committee
- Lawan, Jaisalmer, a village on NH-114 in Jaisalmer District, Rajasthan, India
- Farouk Lawan (born 1962), Nigerian politician
- Lawan Gwadabe (born 1949), Nigerian military officer
- Lawan Musa Abdullahi (born 1970), Nigerian lawyer and politician
- Lawan, an electoral ward in the Baringo North Constituency, Kenya
- "Lawan", a 2021 protest movement in Malaysia
- Lawan (footballer) (born 2005), Brazilian footballer

== See also ==
- Lawaan, Eastern Samar, Philippines
- Lavan (disambiguation)
- Lawa (disambiguation)
- Luan (disambiguation)
