= Lavo (disambiguation) =

Lavo may refer to:

- Lavo, one of the most important cities in the history of Thailand
- Lavo Kingdom
- Lavo Čermelj, Slovene physicist, political activist, publicist and author

== See also ==
- Lavos (disambiguation)
- Lopburi (disambiguation)
- Lava (disambiguation)
- Lawa (disambiguation)
