= Kıymalı =

Turkish foods

Kıymalı is several Turkish dishes. Kıyma means minced meat, and kıymalı means contains/cooked with minced meat in Turkish. Kıyma is the source of the word keema used in the cuisines of the Indian subcontinent.

- Kıymalı pide, a Turkish flatbread with minced meat.
- Kıymalı gözleme, a Turkish pastry dish including minced meat.
