= Luv =

Luv or LUV may refer to:

== Films and television ==
- Luv (TV series), a BBC sitcom
- Luv (play), a Broadway play and 1967 film
- Luv (film), 1967 film
- LUV (film), 2012 film

== Music ==
- Luv (group), a Korean pop group
- Luv', a Dutch pop group
- Lil Uzi Vert (born 1994), American rapper
- Luv (album), a 2017 album by Luna Sea
- "LUV" (A Pink song), a song by Apink
- "Luv" (Janet Jackson song), a 2008 song by Janet Jackson
- "Luv" (Tory Lanez song), a 2016 song by Tory Lanez
- "Luv", a song by Zion I from True & Livin'
- "Luv", a song by Travis
- "Luv?", a 2025 song by Aitch featuring Anne-Marie
- "L.U.V", a 2016 song by BtoB
- "L.U.V.", a song by Charlie Puth

== Other ==
- Chevrolet LUV, a light utility vehicle
- CIELUV, the CIE 1976 L*, u*, v* color space
- Dumatubin Airport (IATA code), Langgur, Kai Islands, Indonesia
- Lava (Ramayana) or Luv, son of Hindu god Rama
- Linux Users of Victoria
- Large unilamellar vesicle (LUV), a type of liposome
- LUV, the New York Stock Exchange symbol of Southwest Airlines
- Luv, a character in Blade Runner 2049

== See also ==
- Light utility vehicle (disambiguation)
- Love (disambiguation)
- Lava (disambiguation)
- Luvs diapers
