= Lavos (disambiguation) =

Lavos is a video game character.

Lavos may also refer to:

- Lavos (Figueira da Foz), a parish in Portugal

== See also ==
- Lavo (disambiguation)
