= World Offshore Championship, Turkey =

World Offshore Championship races in Turkey are organized in 20 rounds by Işıklar Holding. The 2011 schedule was as follows:

Round	Sea (or lake)	Date
Istanbul Golden Horn	Marmara Sea (European side)	9 May
Istanbul Golden Horn	Marmara Sea (European side)	14 May
Samsun	Black Sea	21 May
Samsun	Black Sea	22 May
Adana	Seyhan Dam resorvoir	28 May
Adana	Seyhan Dam resorvoir	29 May
Erdek	Marmara Sea (Asiatic side)	18 June
Erdek	Marmara Sea (Asiatic side)	19 June
Tunceli	Keban Dam reservoir	2 July
Elazığ	Keban Dam resorvoir	3 July
Van	Lake Van	9 July
Van	Lake Van	10 July
Istanbul, Moda	Marmara Sea (Asiatic side)	6 August
Istanbul, Moda	Marmara Sea (Asiatic side)	7 August
Istanbul Golden Horn	Marmara Sea (European side)	17 September
Istanbul Golden Horn	Marmara Sea (European side)	18 September
Istanbul Caddebostan	Marmara Sea (Asiatic side)	15 October
Istanbul Caddebostan	Marmara Sea (Asiatic side)	16 October
Mersin	Mediterranean Sea	29 October
Mersin	Mediterranean Sea	30 October

== Results ==
- 1.place: Stihl team (Kerem Tuncer-Alpay Akdilek) 3237 points
- 2.place: Beşiktaş Miele team (Murat Leki-Tuğberk Uca) 2332 points
- 3.place: GSYİAD Galatasaray team (Francesco Redaelli-Giovanni Cagagni) 1902 points
