= Larva (disambiguation) =

A larva is a juvenile form in biology that has little if any resemblance to its adult form.

Larva may also refer to:

- Larva (film), a 2005 American science fiction horror film
- Larva (TV series), an animated television series made by TUBA Entertainment in Seoul, South Korea
- Larva (mask), or volto, a type of Venetian mask worn at the Carnival of Venice
- Larva, Spain, a municipality in the province of Jaén
- Larva (Vampire Princess Miyu), a Japanese manga and anime character

== See also ==
- Larvae (Roman religion)
- Lava (disambiguation)
