= Kuś =

Kuś may refer to:

- Maciej Kuś (born 1982), Polish figure skater
- Marcin Kuś (born 1981), Polish professional footballer
- Mira Kuś (born 1958), Polish poet, journalist, and children's story author
- Stanisław Kuś, Polish constructor and architect

== See also ==
- Kus (disambiguation)
