= Lawa =

Lawa or Lawas may refer to:

- Lawa people, an ethnic group of Laos and northern Thailand
- Lawa language, spoken by the Lawa people
- Los Angeles World Airports, the commission for airports in Los Angeles, United States
- LAWA (New Zealand), short for Land, Air, Water Aotearoa, originally a collaboration by New Zealand's 16 regional councils.

== Rivers ==
- Lawa River (Africa), a river in West Africa, flowing through Guinea and Liberia
- Lawa River (Indonesia), a river in southeastern Borneo
- Lawa River (South America), a river in the Guyanas region of South America

== Places ==
- Lawa Thikana, a former princely state of India
- Lawa, Punjab, a town in Punjab province, Pakistan
- Lawas, capital town of Lawas District, Sarawak, Malaysia
- Lawa, Philippines, a town in Obando, Bulacan

== See also ==
- Lava (disambiguation)
- Lavo (disambiguation)
- Lawan (disambiguation)
