= Lavans =

Lavans may refer to:

- Lavans-lès-Dole, a commune in the Jura department in eastern France
- Lavans-lès-Saint-Claude, a commune in the Jura department in eastern France
- Lavans-Quingey, a commune in the Doubs department in eastern France
- Lavans-sur-Valouse, a commune in the Jura department in eastern France
- Lavans-Vuillafans, a commune in the Doubs department in eastern France

== See also ==
- Lavan (disambiguation)
