= Kusa =

Kusa or KUSA may refer to:

- Kusa, Russia, a town in Chelyabinsk Oblast, Russia
- Kusa, Latvia, a village in Madona district, Latvia
- Kusa, Oklahoma, United States
- Kusa, indigenous name of Beles River (in Gumuz language)
- KUSA (TV), a television station (channel 9) licensed to Denver, Colorado, United States
- Kennel Union of South Africa
- Kusa, an alternative spelling of Kusha (disambiguation)
- Kusa, a type of squash (fruit) from the Levant region closely related to the zucchini
- Kurashiki University of Science and the Arts, a university in Kurashiki, Okayama, Japan
- In aviation, the unified logon code for Controller–pilot data link communications in the United States

== See also ==
- Kus (disambiguation)
