= Lav (singer) =

American singer-songwriter

- Also known as: Lav
- Born: Kalea Little; July 22, 1998 (age 28)
- Origin: Venice, California
- Genres: indie pop; bedroom pop
- Occupations: singer-songwriter; producer
- Years active: 2018–present
- Label: Color Study

Kalea Little (born July 22, 1998), known by her stage name of Lav, is an American singer-songwriter from Venice, California.

== Early life ==
Little was born in Venice Beach, California and was raised by her mother and grandparents. Her grandfather was a jazz musician, and so Little was introduced at a young age to jazz artists such as Peggy Lee and Julie London.

== Musical career ==
Little gained notoriety after the release of her single “From Me, the Moon”. Billie Eilish reposted the song on her Instagram account, garnering the song over two million plays. Eilish also praised the song on television. As of 2022, the song has over 18 million plays on Spotify.

Little announced in 2020 that she was working on an extended play, with the single “Reds” serving as a pre-release.

== Discography ==
=== Singles ===
- ”Tell Me” (2019)
- ”Love Me, Sweet” (2019)
- ”From Me, the Moon” (2020)
- ”Wavvy” (2020)
- ”The Girls Before Me” (2020)
- ”Reds” (2020)
- ”Sardine Song / Spirit Ditch” (2021)
