= Lavapur Narayan =

- Village
- Location in Bihar, India Lavapur Narayan (India)
- Coordinates: 25.6093°N 85.5226°E
- Country: India
- State: Bihar
- District: Vaishali District

Area
  - Total: 3.82 km^{2} (1.47 sq mi)
- Elevation: 50 m (160 ft)

Population (2011)
  - Total: 7,951
  - Density: 2,080/km^{2} (5,390/sq mi)

Languages
  - Official: Hindi; English
  - Spoken: Maithili
- Time zone: UTC+5:30 (IST)
- PIN: 844506
- Vehicle registration: BR-31
- Website: vaishali.nic.in

Lawapur Narayan is a village situated in Vaishali District, in the Indian state of Bihar.

== Demographics ==
People of many castes live there, but the majority are Brahman and Yadav. The primary language is Maithili, along with Hindi, Urdu, and Bajjika.

== Economy ==
The nearest market is Mahnar bazar.

== Politics ==
Janata Dal (United), LJP, BJP, Lok Janshakti Party, and Indian National Congress are the major political parties.

== Transport ==
The nearest railway station is Mahnar station.

== Culture ==
Pavitra Mandir Asthal is the center of faith for many devotees. The oldest temple of lord Shiva (Mahadeva) attracts many worshippers.

Ma Durga Mandir was built by late Chandra Mohan, Shani Mohan and Manmohan jha in 2010.

Festivals, especially during Durga Pooja glorify Mandir Asthal.
