= Light utility vehicle =

Light utility vehicle or LUV may refer to:

- Light-weight utility vehicle, a vehicle that is designed to carry out a specific task with more efficacy than a passenger vehicle
- All-terrain vehicle, a vehicle that travels on low-pressure tires, has a seat that is straddled by the operator, and has handlebars
- Chevrolet LUV, a light pickup truck
- Military light utility vehicle, a term used for the lightest weight class military vehicle category
