= Lutfullah Halimi =

Ottoman poet and lexicographer

Lutfullah Halimi (Ottoman Turkish: لطف الله حليمى, romanized: Lutfullâh Halîmî, Persian: لطف الله حلیمی, romanized: Loṭf-Allāh Ḥalimi; died 1516) was an Ottoman poet and lexicographer of Persian origin.

== Early life, family and education ==
Halimi was a son of Abi Yusof. The exact whereabouts in relation to his place of birth and education remain unclear. Sources of a later time state that Halimi was born in Amasya near the Black Sea.

== Career ==
According to Aşık Çelebi, Halimi had migrated from Iran and climbed up the ladder through the support of Mahmud Pasha, the Grand Vizier at the time. According to his own works, Halimi had moved from Iran whereafter he was made tutor to Prince Mehmed (later known as Sultan Mehmed the Conqueror, a.k.a. Mehmed II).

It is likely that Halimi became the judge of Sivas during the second reign of Mehmed the Conqueror.

== Personal life and demise ==
According to Kâtip Çelebi, Halimi's death was the result of murder.

== Works ==
Halimi's known works are:

- Bahr al-gharaeb / Loghat-e Halimi (a Persian-Turkish dictionary, found in numerous libraries under various names, such as "Qasemiya", "Qaema", or "Nethar al-malek")
- Mosharrahat al-asma (an Arabic-Persian dictionary)
- Tebb-e manzum (a Persian work on medicine, dedicated to Mehmed the Conqueror. According to Tahsin Yazici / Encyclopædia Iranica, in the preface, Halimi states that he is in "great debt in learning medicine to Greek physicians", and elaborates that "he preferred to use Persian instead of Arabic in a versified work, because he believed that there was no language as refined and graceful as Persian". Yazici adds that in the preface of the work Halimi "acknowledges his debt to Avicenna's Qanun and Shefa".)
- Sharh moktasar al-ashkal (a short treatise on Islamic law, in Arabic)
- Qasida-ye ta'iya (an Arabic poem accompanied by a commentary added later by Halimi. It was presented to Sultan Mehmed the Conqueror. In this work, Halimi praises the sultan and mentions the "misfortunes" that he himself had endured during his life. Yazici notes in relation to the work: "Ḥalimi describes the ideal relationship between rulers and religious leaders, and recounts the attitudes of previous rulers on this issue while chastising fraudulent scholars". Within the work, one also finds Persian couplets and stories.)

== Sources ==
- Storey, C.A. (1984). Persian Literature: A Bibliographical Survey. Vol. III, part 1. Leiden: BRILL.
- Yazici, Tahsin (2003). "Ḥalimi, Loṭf-Allāh". Encyclopaedia Iranica. Vol. XI, Fasc. 6. pp. 588–589.
