= Laban, Virginia =

Unincorporated community in Virginia, US

Coordinates: 37°24′01″N 76°17′01″W

Laban is an unincorporated community in Mathews County, in the U. S. state of Virginia.
