= Confederación de Unificación Sindical =

Nicaraguan national trade union center

CUS
- Confederation of Labour Unification
- Confederación de Unificación Sindical
- 1989 CUS poster
- Founded: 1964
- Headquarters: Managua, Nicaragua
- Location: Nicaragua
- Members: 21,000
- Affiliations: ITUC

The Confederación de Unificación Sindical ('Confederation of Trade Union Unity', CUS) is a national trade union center in Nicaragua. It was formed in 1964 as the Nicaraguan Trade Union Council (CSN).

ICTUR reports that following the Sandinista revolution the CUS rapidly diminished - a result of its involvement with the previous government.

The CUS is affiliated with the International Trade Union Confederation.
