= Chasbaz-e Kusha =

Chasbaz-e Kusha چاسبزكوشا
- Village
- Country: Iran
- Province: Hormozgan
- County: Hajjiabad
- Bakhsh: Ahmadi
- Rural District: Kuh Shah

Population (2006)
  - Total: 65
- Time zone: UTC+3:30 (IRST)
  - Summer (DST): UTC+4:30 (IRDT)

Chasbaz-e Kusha (Persian: چاسبزكوشا, also Romanized as Chāsbaz-e Kūshā) is a village in Kuh Shah Rural District, Ahmadi District, Hajjiabad County, Hormozgan Province, Iran. At the 2006 census, its population was 65, in 13 families.
