= LAV =

LAV or Lav may refer to:

== Persons ==
- Lav, an alternative name for Lava (Ramayana), a son of the Hindu deity Rama and his wife Sita, whose story is told in the Ramayana
- Lav, translation in some Slavic languages of the name Lev
- Luis Antonio Valencia, Manchester United winger
- Lav (singer), the stage name of American singer-songwriter Kalea Little.

== Science and technology ==
- Lavalier microphone, a small microphone with a clip for attaching to clothing
- software packages for encoding and decoding video and audio files:
  - LAV Filters, a set of open-source DirectShow filters based on FFmpeg
  - Libav, a free software project forked from FFmpeg
  - libavcodec, an audio/video codec library provided by FFmpeg and Libav
- Live Attenuated vaccine, a vaccine with weakened but still living pathogen
- Load average, the average of Load (computing)
- Local As View, a view-based query answering approach to data integration
- Lymphadenopathy-associated virus, a former name for HIV (human immunodeficiency virus)

== Vehicles ==
- Leisure activity vehicle, a car classification
- Light Armored Vehicle, another term for armored car (military)
- LAV (armored vehicle), series of armored vehicles made by General Dynamics Land Systems, Canada
  - LAV I, or Armored Vehicle General Purpose 6x6
  - LAV II, 8x8 vehicle
    - LAV-25, used by the United States Marine Corps
  - LAV III, 8x8 vehicle
  - LAV 6, modernization of the LAV III
- Cadillac Cage light armored vehicles:
  - Commando V-150 sometimes referred to as the LAV-150
  - Commando V-200 sometimes referred to as the LAV-200
  - LAV-300
  - LAV-600
- Komatsu LAV, a Japanese armored car, unrelated to the Canadian LAV

== Transportation ==
- Laverton railway station, Melbourne
- Línea Aeropostal Venezolana, an airline of Venezuela
- Líneas de Alta Velocidad, Spanish high-speed railway lines
  - Madrid–Seville high-speed rail line
  - Madrid–Barcelona high-speed rail line
  - Madrid–León high-speed rail line
  - Madrid–Levante high-speed rail network
  - Córdoba–Málaga high-speed rail line
  - Antequera–Granada high-speed rail line

== Other uses ==
- Latvian language (ISO 639-2 & 3 code LAV)
- Lav, Iran, a village in Isfahan Province, Iran
- Lav pivo, a beer brand in Serbia
- The Last American Virgin, a 1982 film
- Let America Vote, a political action organization fighting voter suppression

== See also ==
- Lava (disambiguation)
