= Kuş Island =

Island in Lake Van, Turkey

Coordinates: 38°21′45.57″N 42°59′35.19″E

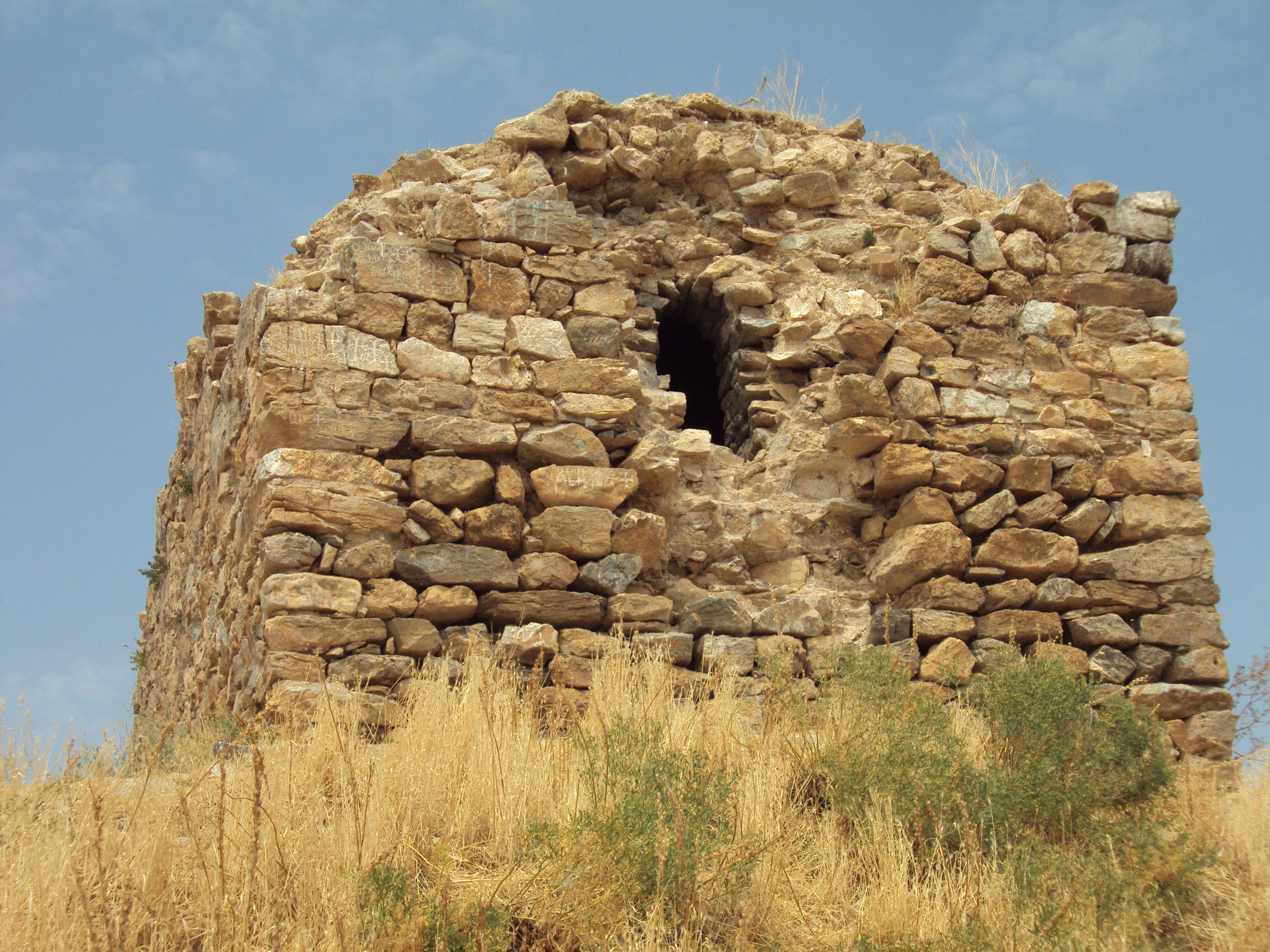
Ruins of the small monastery

Kuş Island (Turkish: Kuş Adası, literally "Bird Island"), also called Arter Island (Armenian: Առտեր կղզի), is a small island in Lake Van, Turkey. It is now uninhabited but formerly contained a small monastery, the ruins of which can still be seen.

== See also ==
- List of islands of Turkey
