= Cuss =

Cuss may refer to:

- Cambridge University Socialist Society
- Common Use Self Service, a standard for airport check-in kiosks.
- Profanity
