= Lavan (name) =

Lavan is both a surname and a given name. Notable people with the name include:

Surname:

- Al Lavan (born 1946), former college football head coach
- Doc Lavan (1890–1952), Major League Baseball shortstop
- John Lavan (1911–2006), former judge on the Supreme Court of Western Australia
- Rene Lavan (born 1968), Cuban-American actor
- Samuel Lavan (born 1982), Israeli footballer

Given name:

- LaVan Davis (born 1966), American actor and singer
- Harvey Lavan "Van" Cliburn Jr. (1934-2013), American pianist

Fictional characters:

- Lavan Firestorm, character in the book Brightly Burning
