= Laava =

Laava may refer to:

- Fernanda Brandão, Brazilian singer, dancer and recording artist based in Munich, Germany
- Laavaan, or laava phere, the four hymns of the Anand Karaj (Sikh wedding ceremony)
