= Lavaş cheese =

Cheese from Turkey

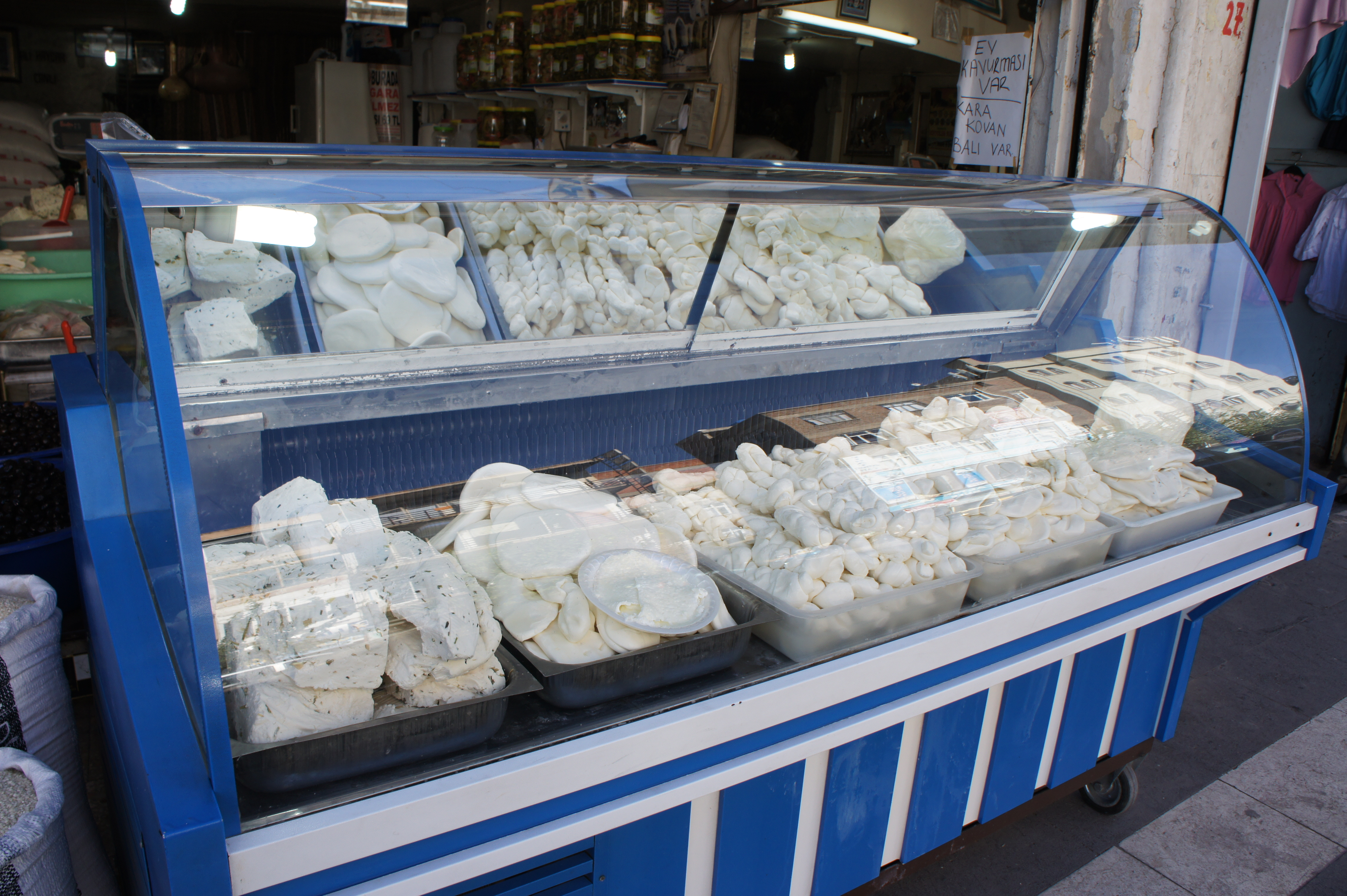
Lavaş cheese being sold at a market

Lavaş cheese is a distinctive variety of cheese traditionally produced in Karacadağ, in the vicinity of Diyarbakır in Turkey. It is generally made from sheep's milk.

== Taste ==
Lavaş cheese has a unique elastic texture. It is mild and slightly salty.

== Production ==
It is produced in the winter time, from livestock on the many farms in Southeastern Turkey.
