= Arevelk =

Arevelk Արեւելք
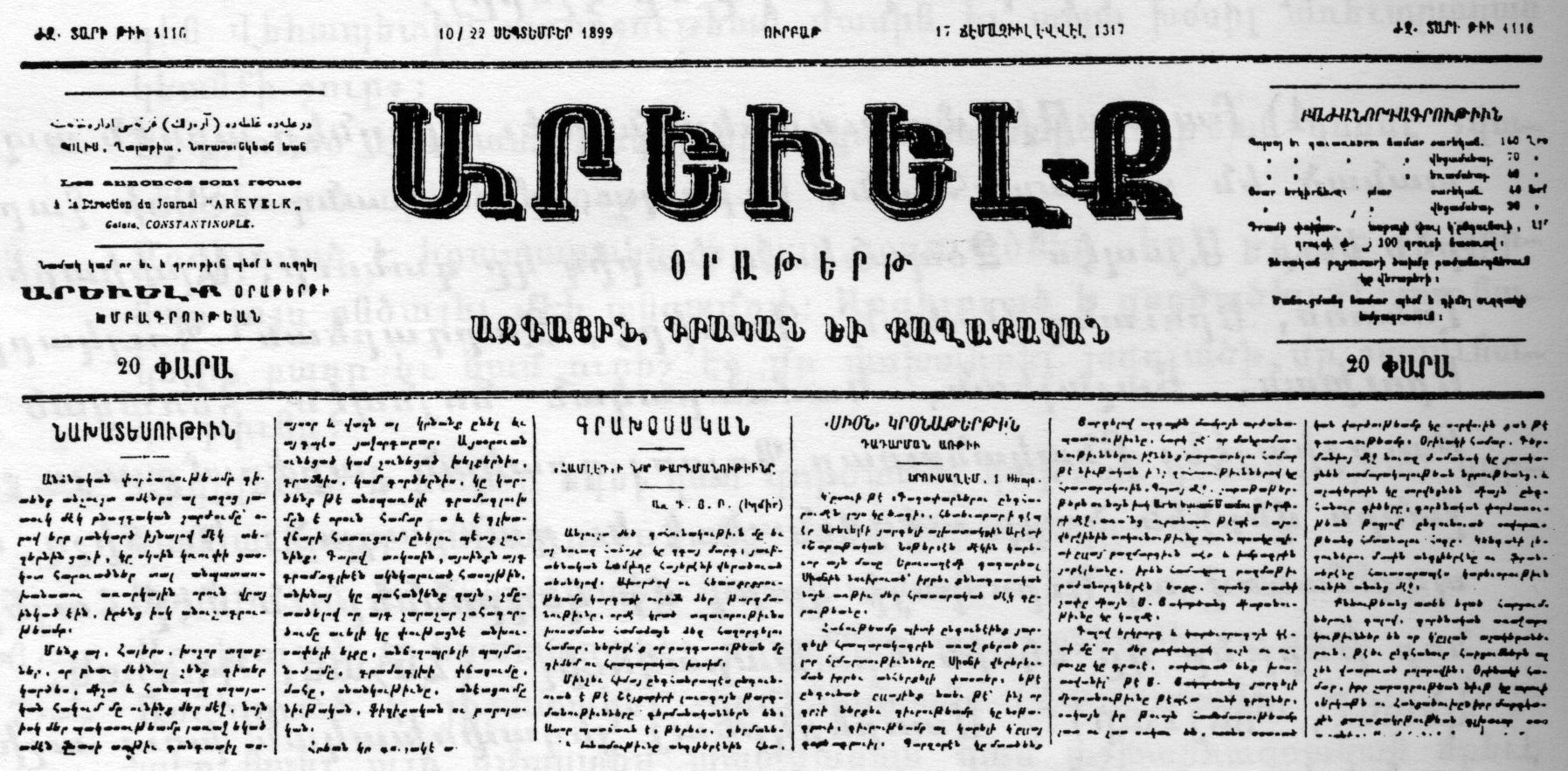
- The September 22, 1899, front page of Arevelk
- Type: Daily newspaper
- Format: Broadsheet
- Founded: 1884
- Ceased publication: 1915
- Language: Western Armenian
- Price: 20 para

Arevelk (Armenian: Արեւելք, meaning "Orient") was a widely circulated and read Armenian newspaper published and circulated throughout the Ottoman Empire.

The newspaper was started by a collaboration of many Armenian writers including Arpiar Arpiarian.

== Prominent contributors ==
- Zabel Sibil Asadour
- Arshag Chobanian
- Msho Kegham
- Vahan Malezian
- Hrand Nazariantz
- Levon Pashalian
- Tlgadintsi
- Karapet Utudjian
- Yerukhan
- Krikor Zohrab
