= Place name changes in Turkey =

Overview of geographical name changes in the Republic of Turkey

Enver Pasha issued an edict in 1916 that all place names originating from non-Muslim peoples would be changed.

Place name changes in Turkey have been undertaken, periodically, in bulk from 1913 to the present by successive Turkish governments. Thousands of names within the Turkish Republic or its predecessor the Ottoman Empire have been changed from their popular or historic alternatives in favour of recognizably Turkish names, as part of Turkification policies. The governments have argued that such names are foreign or divisive, while critics of the changes have described them as chauvinistic. Names changed were usually of Armenian, Greek, Georgian, Laz, Bulgarian, Kurdish (Zazaki), Persian, Neo-Aramaic/Syriac, or Arabic origin.

Turkey's efforts to join the European Union in the early 21st century have led to a decrease in the incidence of such changes from local government, and the central government even more so. In some cases legislation has restored the names of certain villages (primarily those housing Kurds). Place names that changed formally have frequently persisted in local dialects and languages throughout the ethnically diverse country.

The policy of turkifiying non-turkish names already arose in the late stages of the Ottoman Empire. In the early years of the Republic, although the idea of ‘Turkification’ continued to receive interest and support at the ideological level, no significant steps were taken in practice except in isolated instances. Radical forms began in the 1950s. From this date onwards, Turkification was adopted as a ‘state policy’ that transcended political powers. Following the coup d'état of 27 May 1960, within four months, nearly 10,000 new village names were put into official use. Approximately one third of all place names in Turkey were changed before 1965. Some 12,000 villages and 4,000 neighboring settlements, some with thousands of years of history, as well as thousands of rivers, mountains and geographical shapes were given new Turkish names.

== History ==
=== Ottoman Empire ===
The Committee of Union and Progress took the reins of the Ottoman government through a coup d'état in 1913. At the height of World War I and during the final years of the Ottoman Empire, when the ethnic cleansing policies of non-Muslim Greek, Armenian, and Assyrian minorities were underway, Minister of War Enver Pasha issued an edict (ferman) on 6 October 1916, declaring:

It has been decided that provinces, districts, towns, villages, mountains, and rivers, which are named in languages belonging to non-Muslim nations such as Armenian, Greek or Bulgarian, will be renamed into Turkish. In order to benefit from this suitable moment, this aim should be achieved in due course.

General Directorate of State Archives of the Republic of Turkey, İstanbul Vilayet Mektupçuluğu, no. 000955, 23 Kânunuevvel 1331 (6 October 1916) Ordinance of Enver Paşa

Enver Pasha did not change the geographical names belonging to Muslim minorities (i.e. Arabs and Kurds) due to the Ottoman government's role as a Caliphate. His decree inspired many Turkish intellectuals to write in support of such measures. One such intellectual, Hüseyin Avni Alparslan (1877–1921), a Turkish soldier and author of books about Turkish language and culture, was inspired by the efforts of Enver Pasha, writing in his book Trabzon İli Lâz mı? Türk mü? (Is the Trabzon province Laz or Turkish?) that:

If we want to be the owner of our country, then we should turn even the name of the smallest village into Turkish and not leave its Armenian, Greek or Arabic variants.

Only in this way can we paint our country with its colors.

It is not known how many geographical names were changed under the ordinance. The ultimate overarching objective behind it failed due to the collapse of the Ottoman government and trials of its leaders before Ottoman and European courts for massacres against ethnic minorities committed in 1915.

A decreased level of cultural repression has taken place in the Turkish Republic; however, non-mainstream Turkic origin place names have invariably been officially renamed over the course of time.

=== Republic of Turkey ===
Turkish nationalism and secularism were two of the six founding principles of the Turkish Republic. Mustafa Kemal Atatürk, the leader of the early decades of the Republic, aimed to create a nation state (Turkish: Ulus) from the Turkish remnants of the Ottoman Empire. During the first three decades of the Republic, efforts to Turkify geographical names were a recurring theme. Imported maps containing references to historical regions such as Armenia, Kurdistan, or Lazistan (the official name of the province of Rize until 1921) were prohibited (as was the case with Der Grosse Weltatlas, a map published in Leipzig).

By 1927, all street and square names in Istanbul which were not of Turkish origin were changed.

In 1940 the Ministry of Internal Affairs (MoIA) issued a circular which called for original or foreign language place names to be substituted with Turkish place names. Journalist and writer Ayşe Hür has noted that after the death of Atatürk and during the Democratic period of the Turkish Republic in the late 1940s and 50s, "ugly, humiliating, insulting or derisive names, even if they were Turkish, were subjected to changes. Village names with lexical components meaning red (kızıl), bell (çan), church (kilise, e.g. Kirk Kilise) were changed. To do away with "separatist notions", the Arabic, Persian, Armenian, Kurdish, Georgian, Tatar, Circassian, and Laz village names were also changed."

The Special Commission for Name Change (Ad Değiştirme İhtisas Kurulu) was created in 1952 under the supervision of the Ministry of the Interior. It was invested with the power to change all names that were not within the jurisdiction of the municipalities like streets, parks or places. In the commission were representatives from the Turkish Language Society (Türk Dil Kurumu), from the faculties geography, language and history from the Ankara University, the Military General Staff and the ministries of Defense, Internal Affair and education. The committee was working until 1978 and 35% of the villages in Turkey got their names changed. The initiative proved successful, as approximately 28,000 topographic names were changed, including 12,211 village and town names and 4,000 mountain, river, and other topographic names. This figure also included names of streets, monuments, quarters, neighborhoods, and other components that make up certain municipalities. The committee was reinstated after the military coup of 1980 in 1983 and it changed the names of 280 villages. It was closed again in 1985 due to inefficiency. During the heightened tension between Kurdish rebels and the Turkish government, the focus of geographical name changing in the 1980s was on Kurdish villages, towns, rivers.etc.

In 1981, the Turkish government stated in the preface of Köylerimiz, a publication dedicated to names of Turkish villages, that:

Approximately 12,000 village names that are non-Turkish, understood to originate from non-Turkish roots, and identified as causing confusion have been examined and replaced with Turkish names, and put into effect by the Substitution Committee for Foreign Names functioning at the Directorate General for Provincial Governments in our Ministry.

At the culmination of the policy, no geographical or topographical names of non-Turkish origin remained. Some of the newer names resembled their native names, but with revised Turkish connotations (i.e. Aghtamar was changed to Akdamar).

=== Current status ===
Although geographical names have been formally changed in Turkey, their native names persist and continue in local dialects throughout the country. At times, Turkish politicians have also used the native names of cities during their speeches. In 2009, when addressing a crowd in the town of Güroymak, president Abdullah Gül used the native name Norşin. Also that year, when talking about his family origins, Prime Minister Recep Tayyip Erdoğan used the native Greek name of Potamya instead of Güneysu.

Efforts at restoring the former names of geographical terms have been recently introduced in Turkey. In September 2012, legislation was introduced to restore the names of (primarily Kurdish) villages to their former native names. According to the bill, the province of Tunceli would be named Dersim, Güroymak would be named Norşin, and Aydınlar would be named Tilo. However, the Turkish Government authority later opposed the name Dersim, as the local municipality wanted to introduce the name Dersim for Tunceli.

== Comparative analysis ==
Most of the geographical name changes occurred in the eastern provinces of the country and on the coast of the eastern Black Sea, where minority populations tend to live. Through independent study, etymologist Sevan Nişanyan estimates that, of the geographical location name changes, 4,200 were Greek, 4,000 Kurdish, 3,600 Armenian, 750 Arabic, 400 Assyrian, 300 Georgian, 200 Laz, and 50 others. The official statistics of The Special Commission for Name Change (Ad Degistirme Ihtisas Komisyonu) claim that the total number of villages, towns, cities, and settlements renamed is 12,211. The chart below lists the provinces and the number of villages or towns renamed.

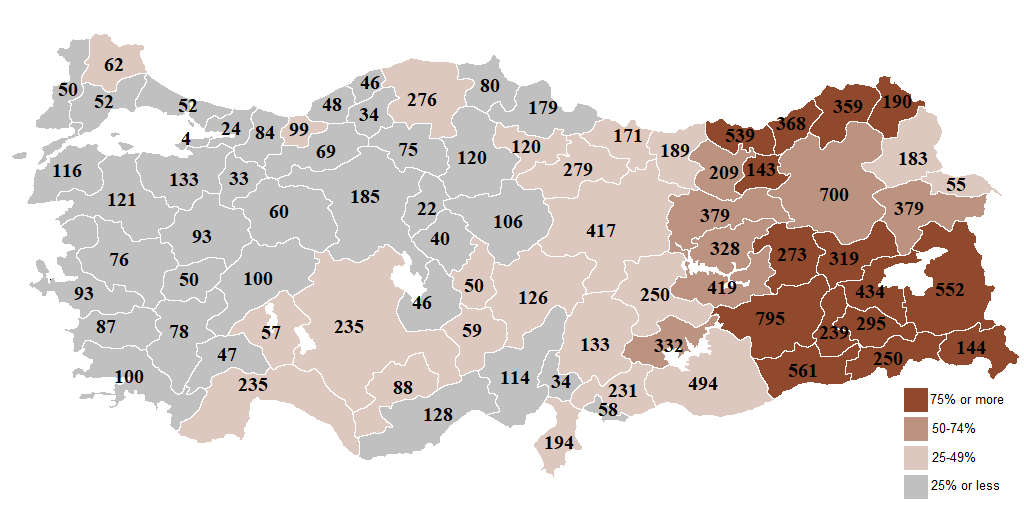
Number of geographical name changes from 1916 onwards per Turkish province with color-coded percentages

Linguistic distribution of place names, according to Sevan Nişanyan
Language	Known origin	Proposed origin	Total projected	Total percentage (%)
Turkish (changed)	2,200	–	2,500	6.1
Kurdish/Zazaki	2,850	–	4,000	9.8
Armenian	1,491	450	3,600	8.8
Greek	1,090	430	4,200	10.2
Arabic	320	–	750	1.8
Syriac	165	–	400	1.0
Georgian	180	–	300	0.7
Laz	100	–	200	0.5
Other	40	–	50	0.1
Total changed names	8,436	880	16,000	39.9
Total unchanged (Turkish) names	N/A	N/A	25,000	60.1
Total	N/A	N/A	41,000	100.0

== Notable geographical name changes ==
=== Armenian ===
Armenian geographic names were first changed under the reign of Sultan Abdul Hamid II. In 1880, the word Armenia was banned from use in the press, schoolbooks, and governmental establishments, to be replaced with words like Anatolia or Kurdistan. Armenian name changing continued under the early Republican era up until the 21st century. It included the Turkification of last names, change of animal names, change of the names of Armenian historical figures (i.e. the name of the prominent Balyan family was concealed under the identity of a superficial Italian family called Baliani), and the change and distortion of Armenian historical events.

Most Armenian geographical names were in the eastern provinces of the Ottoman Empire. Villages, settlements, or towns that contain the suffix -kert, meaning built or built by (i.e. Manavazkert (today Malazgirt), Norakert, Dikranagert, Noyakert), -shen, meaning village (i.e. Aratashen, Pemzashen, Norashen), and -van, meaning town (i.e. Charentsavan, Nakhichevan, Tatvan), signify an Armenian name. Throughout Ottoman history, Turkish and Kurdish tribesmen have settled into Armenian villages and changed the native Armenian names (i.e. the Armenian Norashen was changed to Norşin). This was especially true after the Armenian genocide, when much of eastern Turkey was depopulated of its Armenian population.

Sevan Nişanyan estimates that 3,600 Armenian geographical locations have been changed.

Geographical distribution of placenames of Armenian origin

=== Syriac ===
Most Syriac name changes occurred in the southeast of Turkey near the Syrian border in the Tur Abdin region, and were changed from Neo-Aramaic (specifically Turoyo) to Turkish. After Sayfo, the Assyrian/Syriac Christians (Note: There is currently a naming dispute contested by Syriac Orthodox Christians from Tur Abdin, involving use of the names Assyrian, Syriac, and Aramean. All three, as well as "Suraye/Suryoye", are used to refer to the same people.) of the region were either depopulated or massacred. Currently, there are around 25-30,000 Assyrians who remain in Turkey, with 10-16% in Tur Abdin alone.

Many Assyrian geographical name changes took place after the 1980 Turkish coup d'état, as part of nationalist efforts by the military-led government. Name changes were also extended to villages in the Tur Abdin region that were inhabited by the Mhallami, an Arabic-speaking tribal ethnic group who converted to Islam under pressure. Some examples of name changes include the villages of Dayro da-Slibo (Çatalçam, Dargeçit), Ḥāḥ (Anıtlı, Midyat), Bsorino (Haberli, İdil), and Kafro Tahtoyo (Elbeğendi, Midyat). In 2015, the village of Beth Kustan, Midyat was officially renamed to its original Syriac label from the Turkish "Alagöz", and was commemorated as an example to follow for other Assyrian villages in the region.

Turkification policies impacting Assyrian villages in Turkey have previously been the subject of artistic protest, namely by Assyrian singer Habib Mousa. In one song, he sings about the village of Enhil, challenging actions by the government of Turkey in removing traces of the Assyrian heritage of Tur Abdin, while establishing himself and other "Enhiloye" as the village's leaders. Nişanyan estimates that 400 Assyrian geographical locations have had their Syriac names changed.

Map showing native names of Assyrian villages in the Tur Abdin region

=== Georgian and Laz ===
The historical region of Tao-Klarjeti, which includes the modern provinces of Artvin, Rize, Ardahan and the northern part of Erzurum, has long been the center of Georgian culture and religion. Lazistan and Tao-Klarjeti, then part of the Georgian Principality of Samtskhe, was conquered by the Ottoman Empire in the middle of the 16th century. Due to linguistic differences, the new Ottoman administration in his records on Gurjistan Vilayet (Province of Georgia) adapted Georgian geographical names in Ottoman-Turkish style. Some geographical names were changed so drastically that it has become almost impossible to determine its original form. Geographical name changes by the Ottomans became intense in 1913. After the collapse of the Ottoman Empire in 1923, the new Turkish government continued old policy. The first attempts by Turkish republican officials to change Georgian geographical names began in 1925. The changes in geographical names periodically took place after 1959 and continued throughout of 20th century. Despite the fact that Georgians were making significant minority in the region, in 1927 the provincial council of Artvin banned Georgian language. The inhabitants however retained usage of old geographical names in colloquial speech.

Between 1914 and 1990, Turkish semi-autonomous bureaucratic regimes changed 33% geographical names in Rize and 39% in Artvin.

Nişanyan estimates that 500 Georgian and Laz geographical names have been changed to Turkish (300 Georgian, 200 Laz).

Geographical distribution of placenames of Georgian origin

=== Greek ===
Many of the Greek names have maintained their origins from the Byzantine Empire and Empire of Trebizond era. Significant Greek name place changes in the Republic of Turkey include the city of Istanbul in 1930, which over time has been called many Greek names such as Kōnstantinoúpolis (Greek: Κωνσταντινούπολις, lit. 'Constantinopolis') and Byzantion (Ancient Greek: Βυζάντιον, romanized: Byzántion, Latin: Byzantium). Another example is İzmir, which was changed from Smyrna (/ˈsmɜːrnə/ SMUR-nə; Greek: Σμύρνη, romanized: Smýrni/Smýrnē) in the early 20th century. In 2020, Greek sources alleged that former Turkish admiral Cihat Yaycı proposed renaming the Aegean Sea due to its Greek roots.

Nişanyan estimates that 4,200 Greek geographical locations have been changed, the most of any ethnic minority.

Geographical distribution of placenames of Greek origin

=== Kurdish ===
The Kurdish (and Zaza) geographical name changes were exempt under the Ottoman Empire due to the Islamic religious orientation of Kurds. During the Republican era and especially after the Dersim massacre, Kurdish geographical name changes became more common. During the Turkish Republican era, the word Kurdistan was banned, with some governments not acknowledging Kurds as an ethnic group. The Turkish government has periodically disguised the presence of the Kurds statistically by categorizing them as Mountain Turks. This classification was changed to the new euphemism of Eastern Turk in 1980.

Nişanyan estimates that 4,000 Kurdish and Zaza geographical locations have been changed.

Geographical distribution of placenames of Kurdish and Zaza origin

== See also ==
- Nation state, a political concept rooted in Europe and influenced Turkey
- Animal name changes in Turkey
- Replacement of loanwords in Turkish
- Geographical renaming
- Geographical regions of Turkey
- Denial of Kurds by Turkey
- Istanbul (Not Constantinople)

== Bibliography ==
- Muvahhid Zeki (2010). Artvin Vilâyeti hakkında ma'lûmât-ı umûmîyye (in Turkish). İstanbul. ISBN 978-9944-197-52-6.
