= Levon Pashalian =

Levon Pashalian Լեւոն Բաշալեան
- Born: 24 September 1868; Uskudar, Constantinople, Ottoman Turkey
- Died: 1 February 1943 (aged 74); Vichy, France
- Occupations: Novelist, journalist, short story writer, and political activist.

Levon Pashalian (Armenian: Լեւոն Բաշալեան; 1868 in Constantinople, Ottoman Empire - 1943 in Vichy, France), was an Armenian short story writer, journalist, editor, novelist, and politician.

== Biography ==
Levon Pashalian was born in 1868 in Üsküdar, a district of Constantinople that is situated on the Asiatic side of the Bosphorus. He attended the prestigious Berberian Varjaran (High School) and studied under famed principal and pedagogue Reteos Berberian (Who was the founder and principal of the school as well). He began his literary career in the local Massis, Arevelk, and Hayrenik Armenian newspapers. He joined the Hnchakian political party but fled to safety in Paris, France in the 1890s when the Ottoman government began persecuting Armenian political activists. He met with Arpiar Arpiarian in London and began a newspaper called Nor Gyank dedicated to the newly found Reformed Hnchakist Party. This paper later merged into Hnchak, which would be the Party's official organ.

In 1902 Levon Pashalian went to Baku in order to work for a French oil company. He remained in Baku until the Bolshevik Revolution in 1920. After the revolution, he returned to Paris and continued his literary career and political activism. In 1922-1923 he was a member of the Armenian National Delegation led by Boghos Nubar which was a commission intent on dealing with the Armenian plight after World War I. He joined the Armenian General Benevolent Union and visited Soviet Armenia in 1924 to help construct schools, hospitals, and settlements. In 1928 he founded the French-Armenian newspaper Le Foyer which lasted until 1932. He died in Vichy, France.

== Literary career ==
Levon Pashalian is known to be one of the leading realist writers in the Armenian literary scene. His famous short stories and novels include Tratsuhin (The neighbor woman, 1888), Verchin Hampuyri (The last kiss, 1890), Nor Zkesdi (New outfit, 1890), Terterian Ukhdi (The vow of a priest); which was made into a short movie in Armenia, Aghavniner (Pigeons, 1894). His short stories were scattered all over newspapers and journals until Arshag Chobanian collected them and published them under one book called Noraveber yev Patmvazkner (Short novels and stories).
