= Çarpanak Island =

Island in Lake Van, Turkey

Coordinates: 38.606553°N 43.085581°E

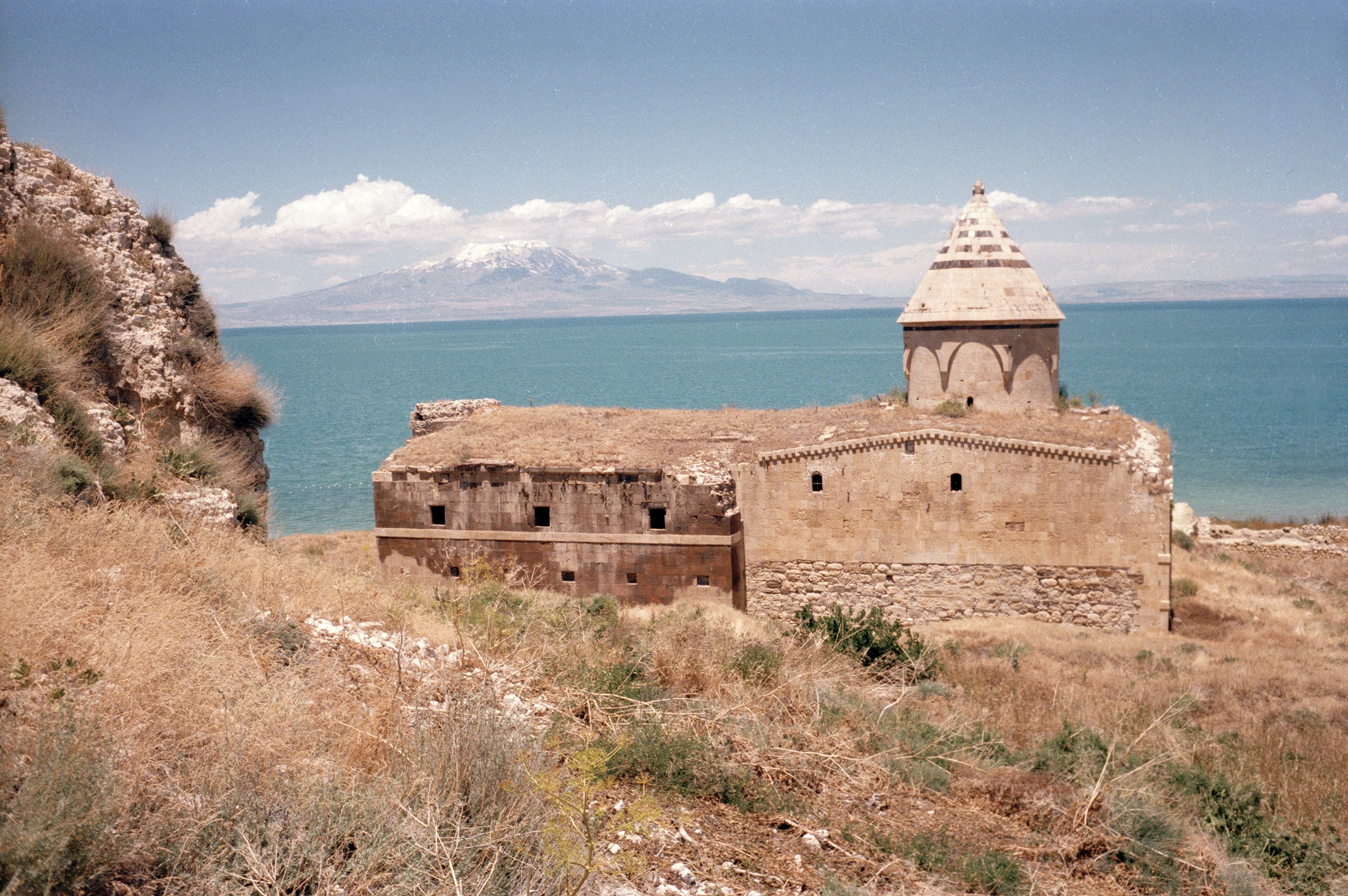
The 15th century Armenian monastery of Ktuts in Çarpanak Island

Çarpanak Island (Turkish: Çarpanak Adası) or Ktuts or Ktouts (Armenian: Կտուց կղզի Ktuts kghzi), is a small island in Lake Van. It is now uninhabited, but formerly contained an Armenian monastery called Ktuts. The ruins of it can still be seen.

== Gallery ==
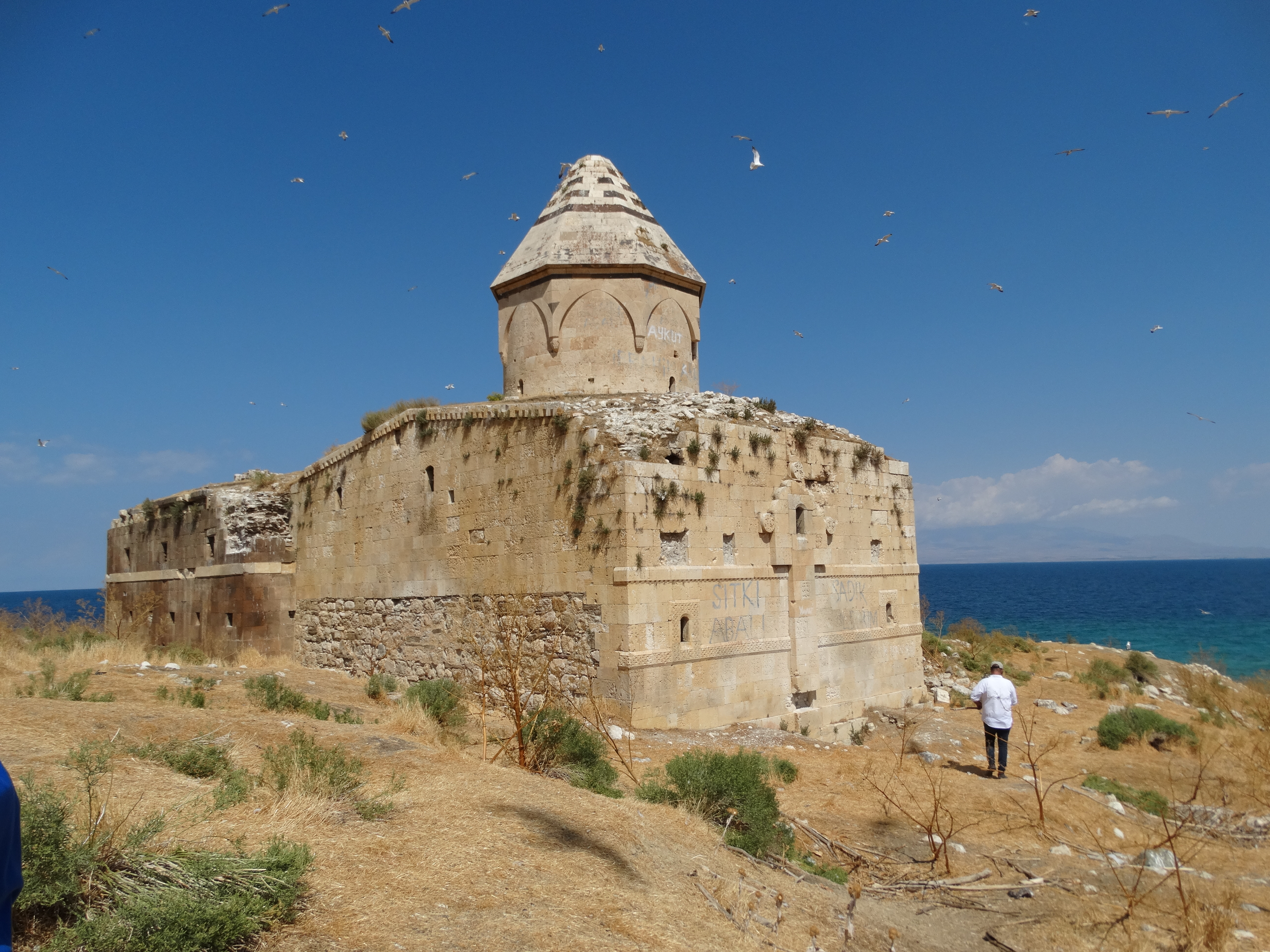

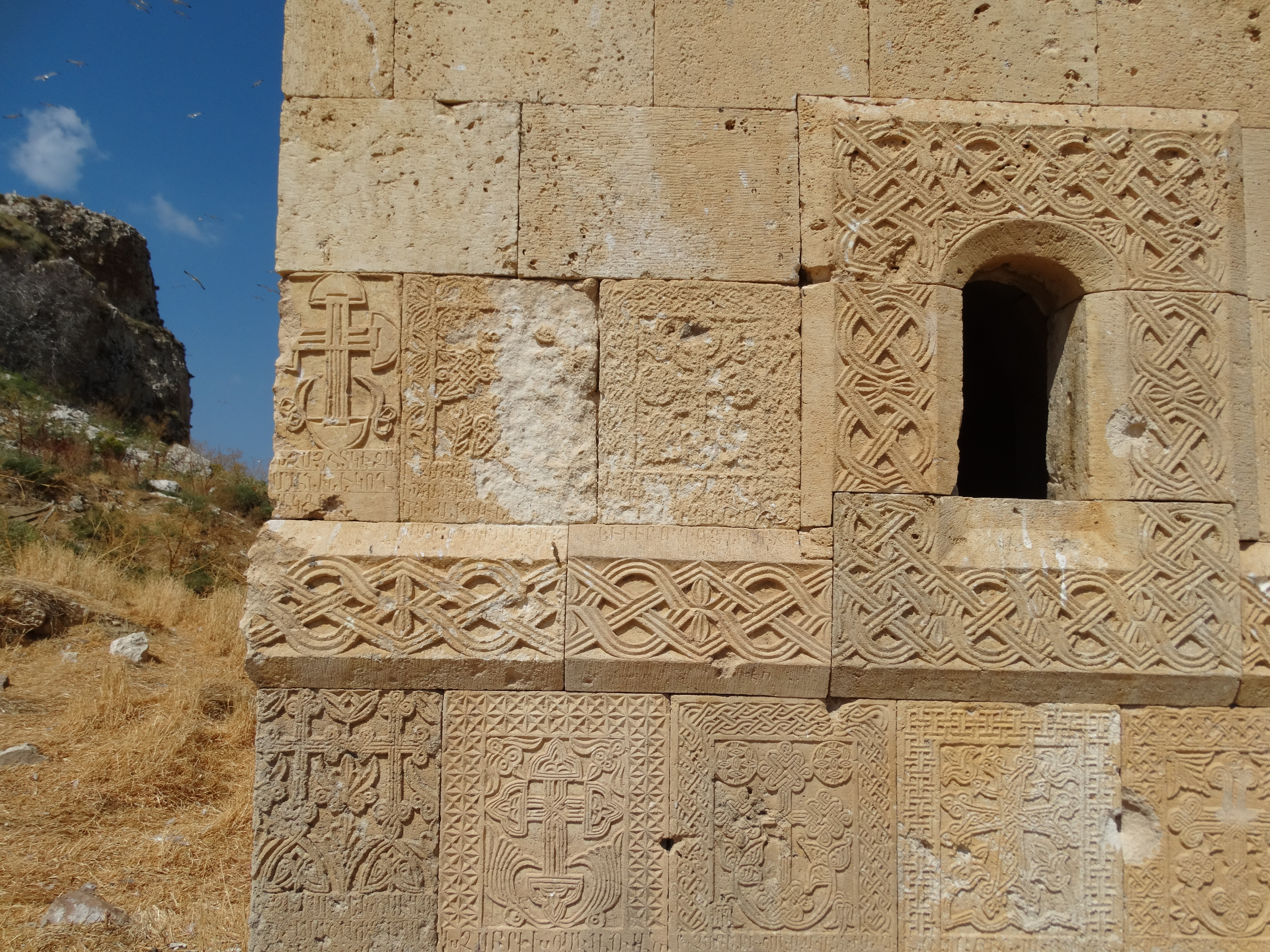

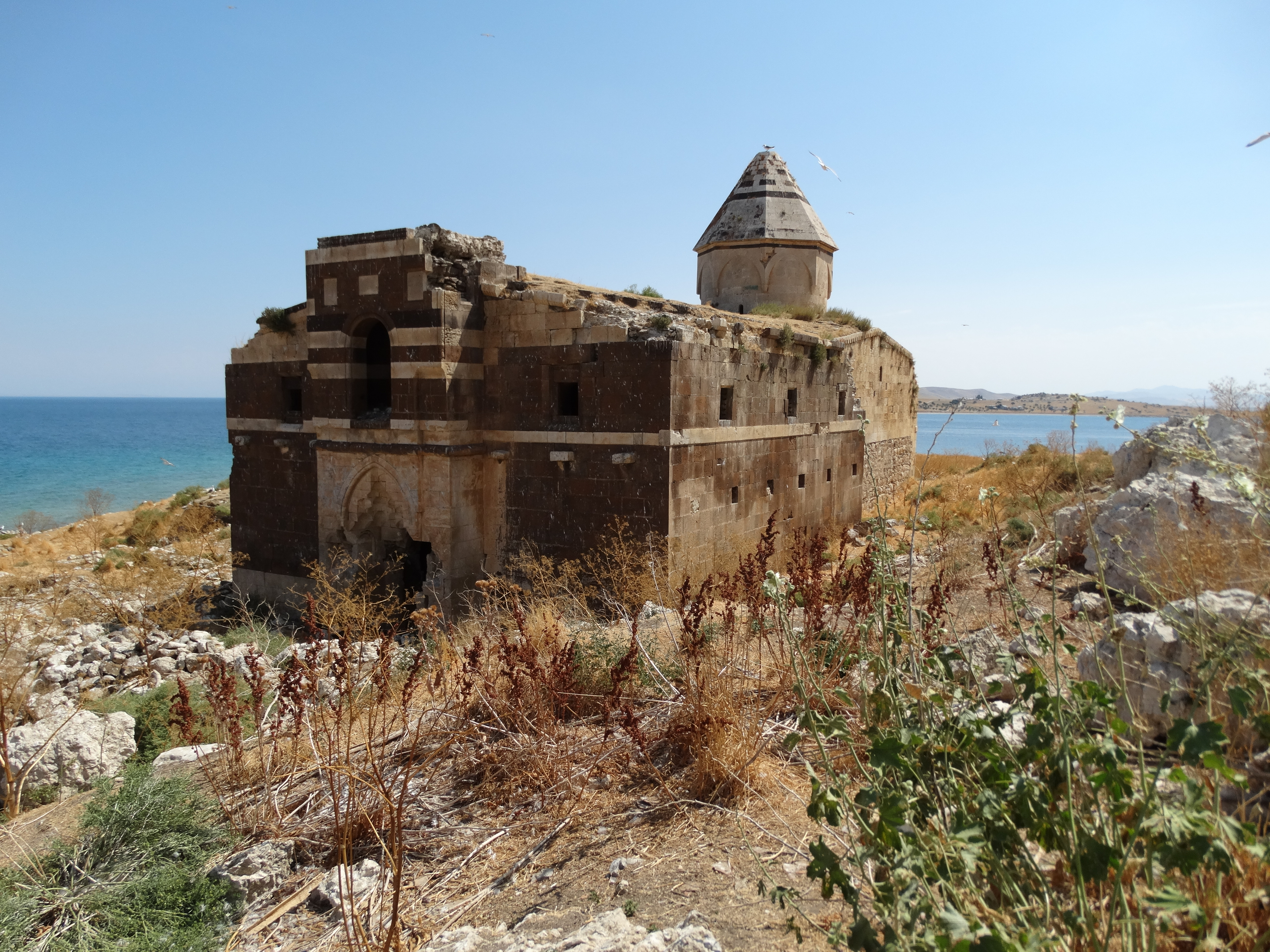

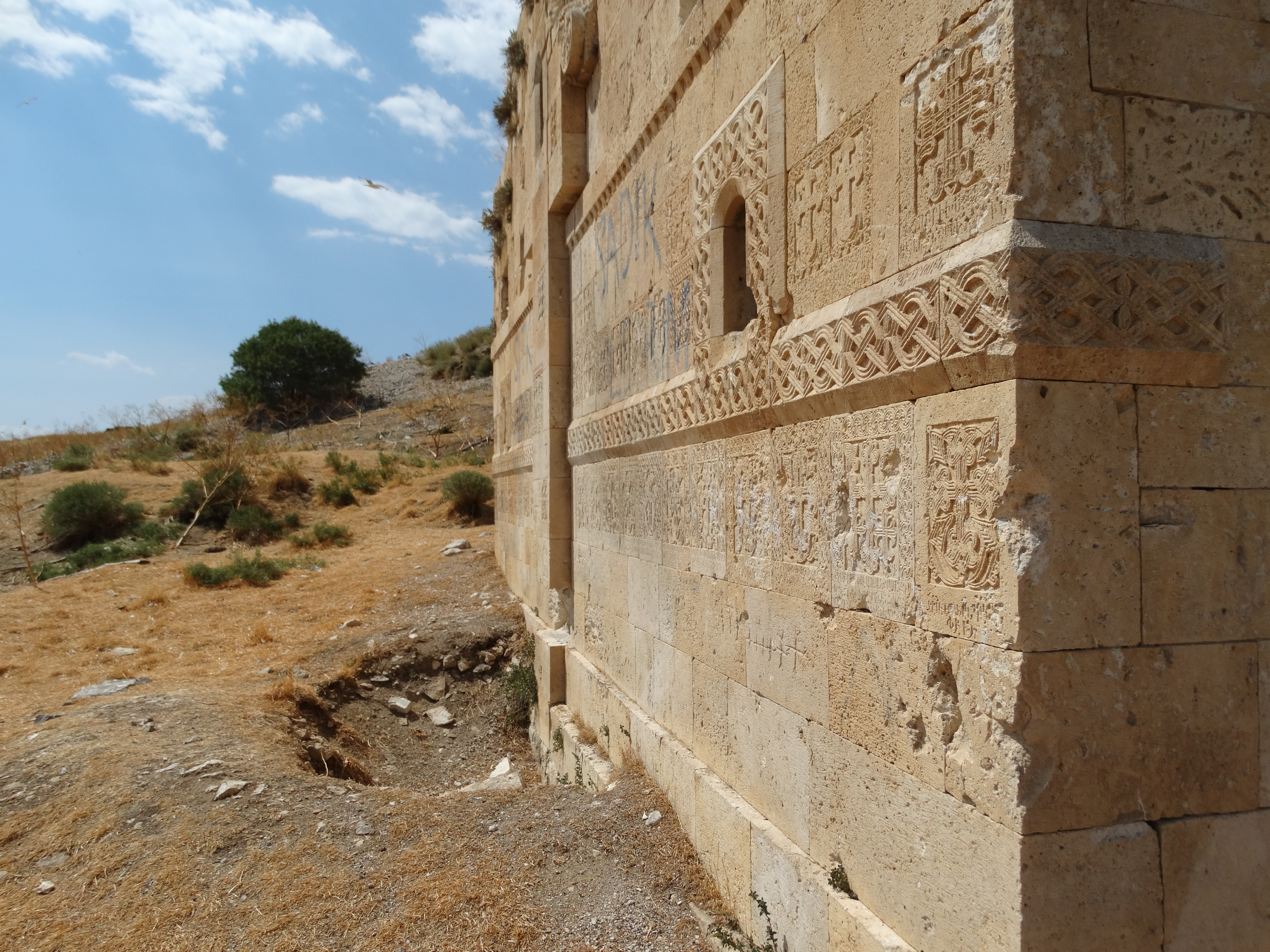

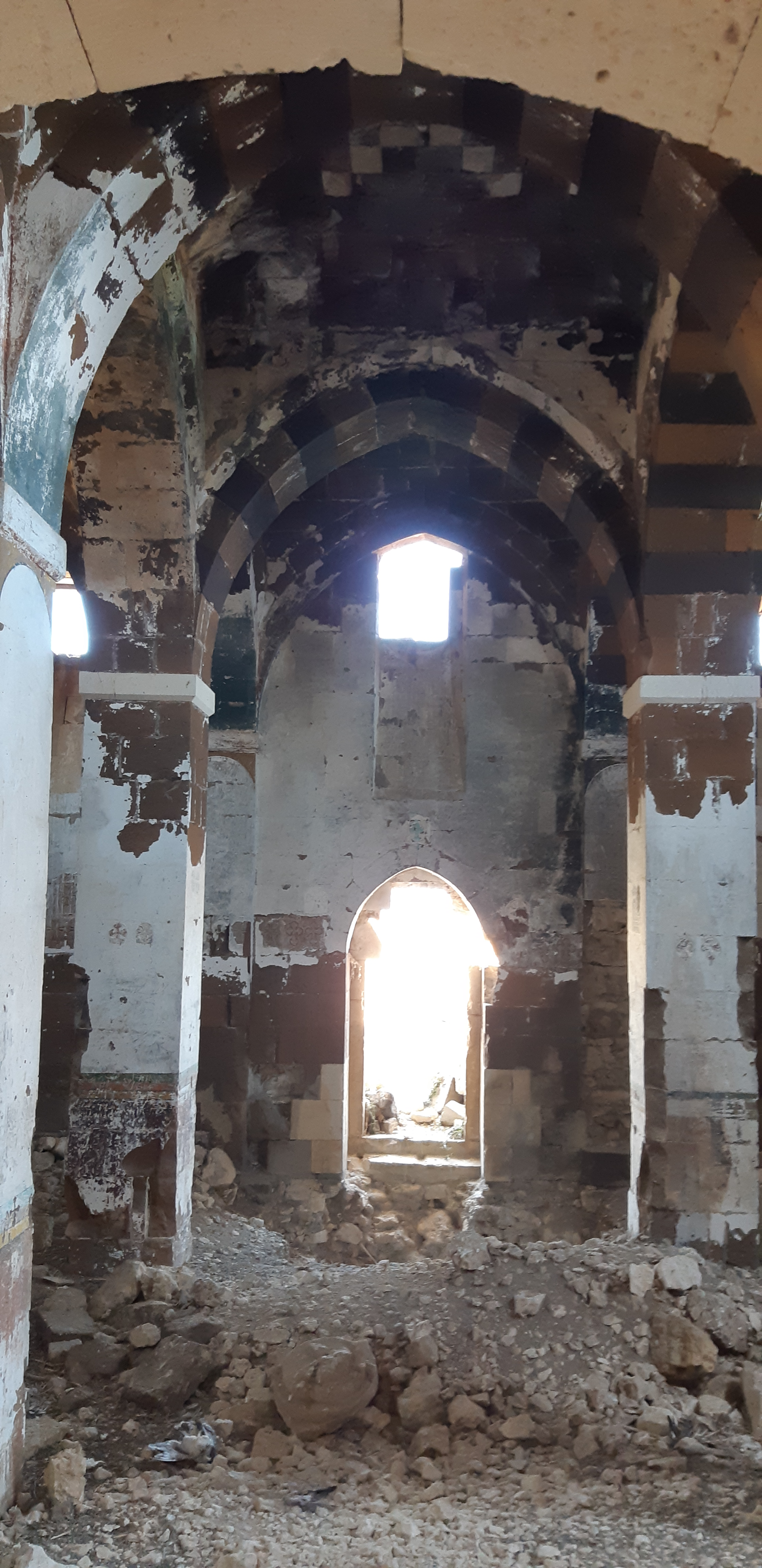

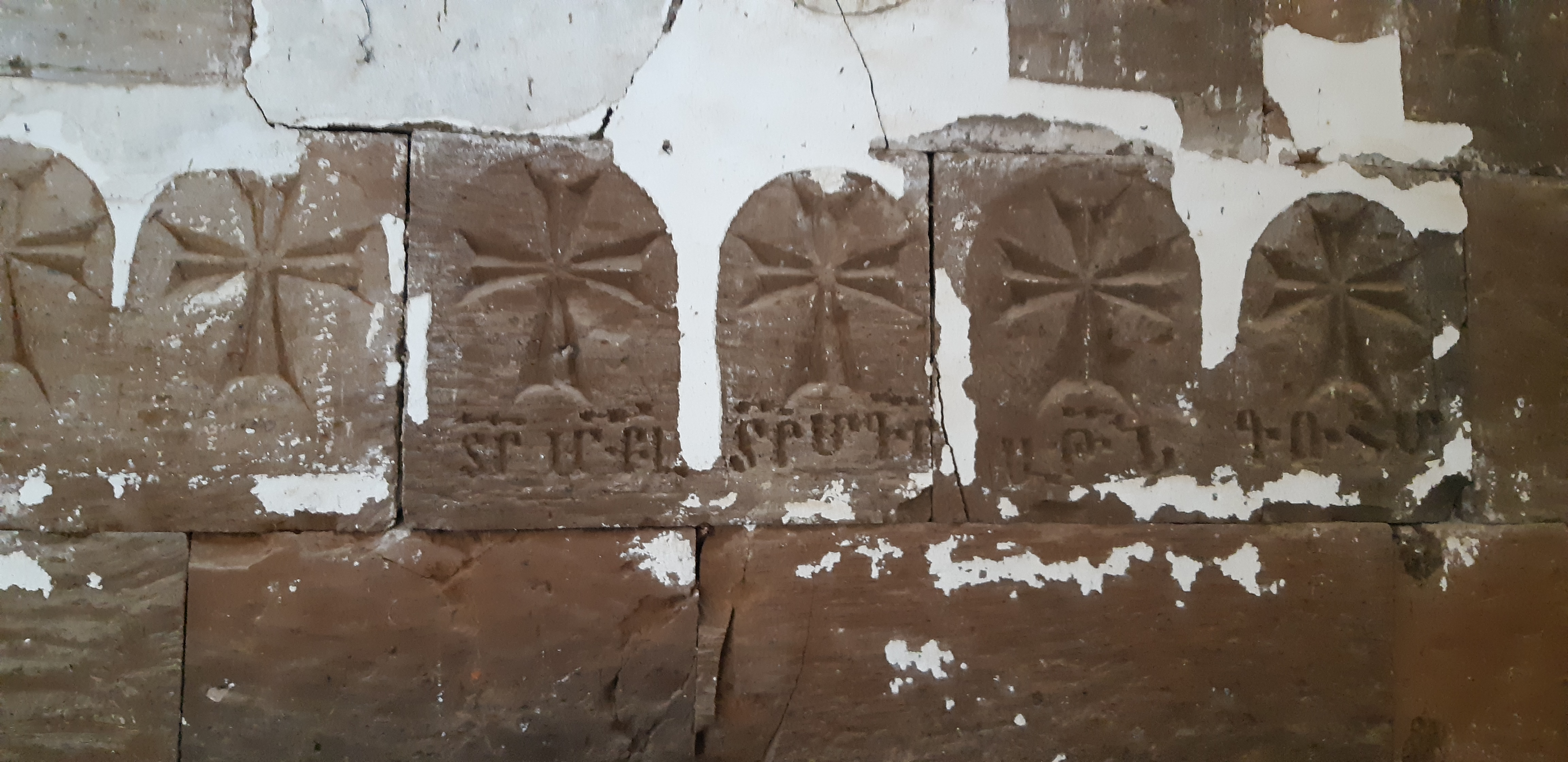

== See also ==
- Lake Van
- Ktuts monastery
- Akdamar Island
- Kuş Island
