= Ktuts Monastery =

Former Armenian monastery on an island in Lake Van, Turkey

- Կտուց վանք
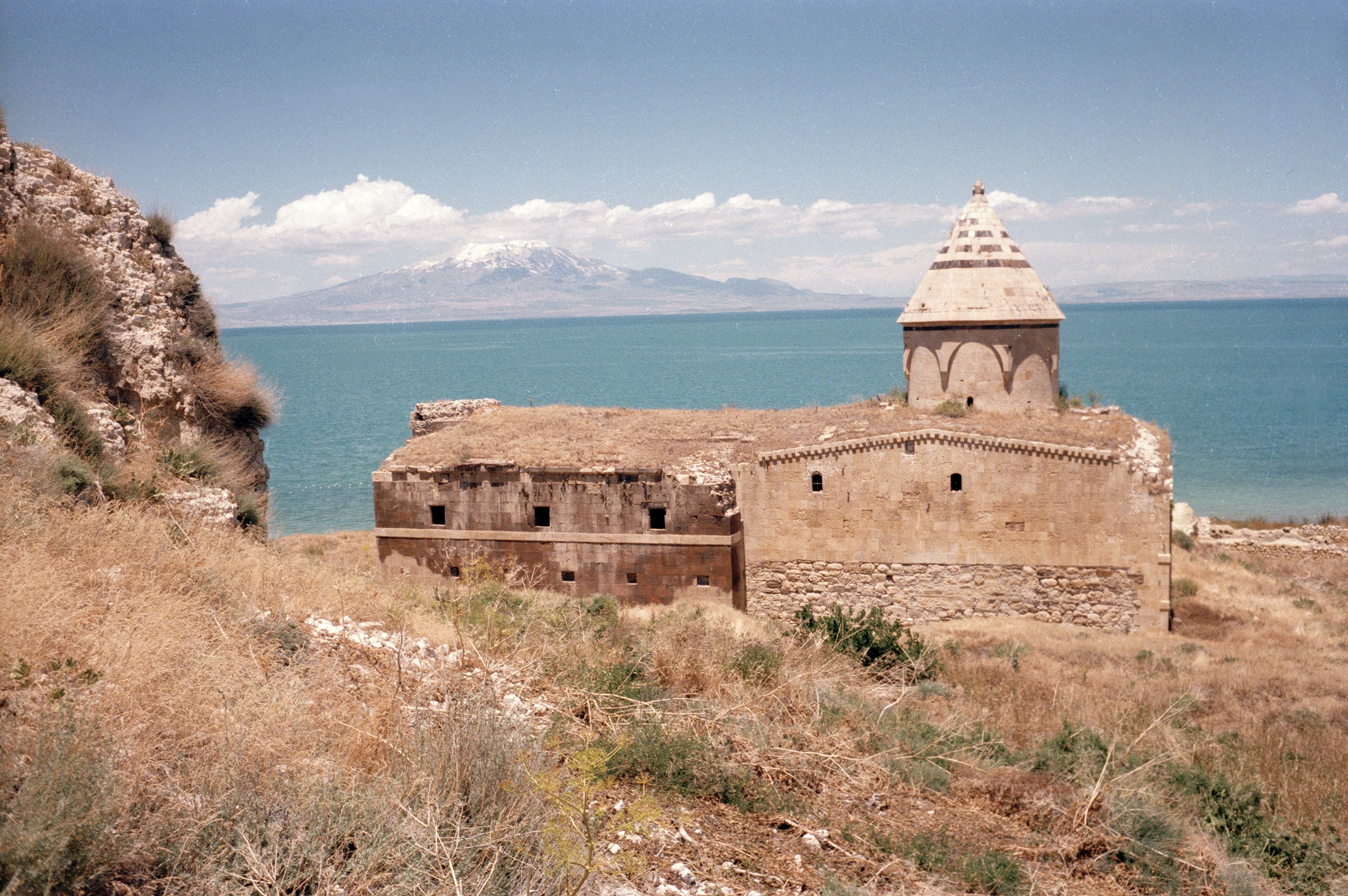
- Ktuts monastery with Mount Sipan in background (1986)

- Location within Turkey

Religion
- Affiliation: Armenian Apostolic Church
- Rite: Armenian
- Status: In ruins

Location
- Location: Ktuts Island, Turkey
- Coordinates: 38°36′31.68″N 43°5′2.17″E,

Architecture
- Type: Monastery
- Style: Armenian
- Groundbreaking: 15th century

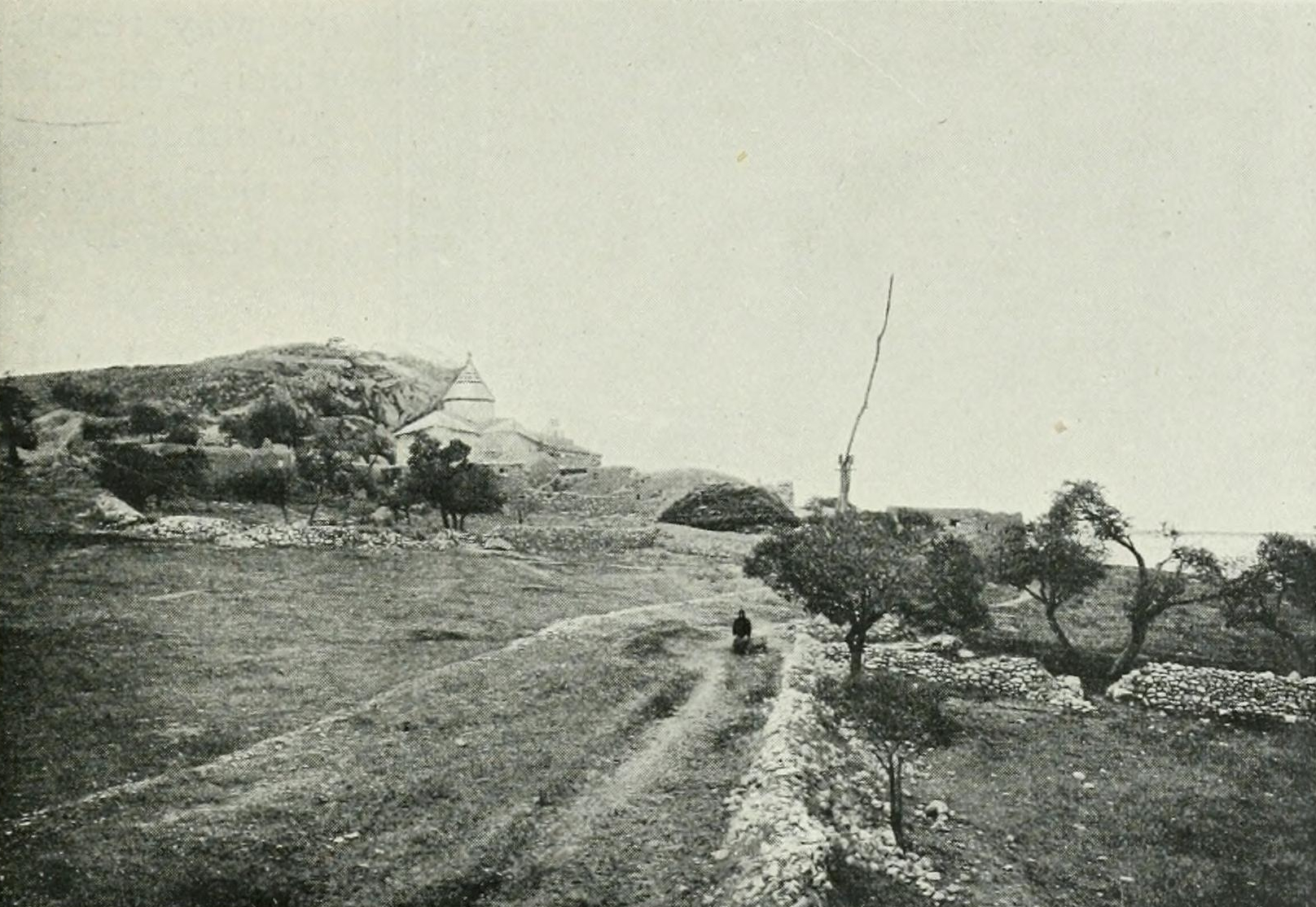
The monastery from H. F. B. Lynch's Armenia, travels and studies (1901)

Ktuts monastery (Armenian: Կտուց, meaning beak in Armenian) is an abandoned 15th century Armenian monastery on the small island of Ktuts (Çarpanak) in Lake Van, Vaspurakan (present-day Turkey) which fell into ruins after the Armenian genocide beginning in 1915. According to tradition, the monastery was founded in the 4th century by Saint Gregory the Illuminator, after his return from Rome. It contained a hand of John the Baptist, which was kept in a reliquary now held at the Armenian Patriarchate of Jerusalem.

The first historical records referring to the monastery date to the 15th century, when it was known for its scriptorium. Manuscripts from this time are kept at the Matenadaran in Yerevan, Armenia. The monastery was most likely destroyed in an earthquake in 1648, before being rebuilt in the 18th century with funding from the people of Bagesh. It became one of the two seats of the diocese Lim and Ktuts.

At the time of the Hamidian massacres of 1894–1896, many refugees took shelter at the monastery. However this was not repeated during the Armenian Genocide in 1915–1916, as access to the island was prevented by the Ottoman police. Since that time the monastery has been abandoned and only the church and its gavit remain.

== Gallery ==
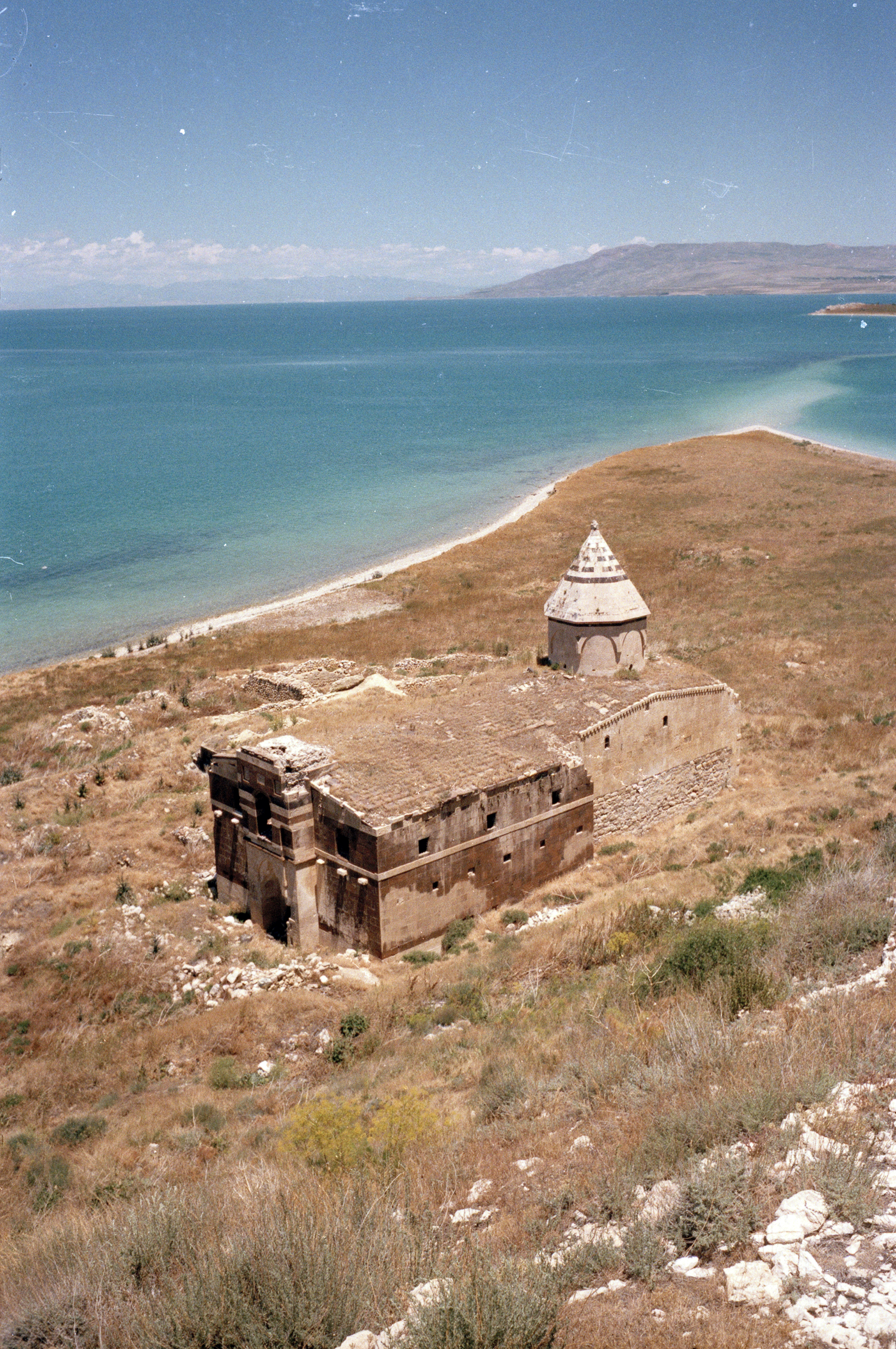
Ktuts on Lake Van

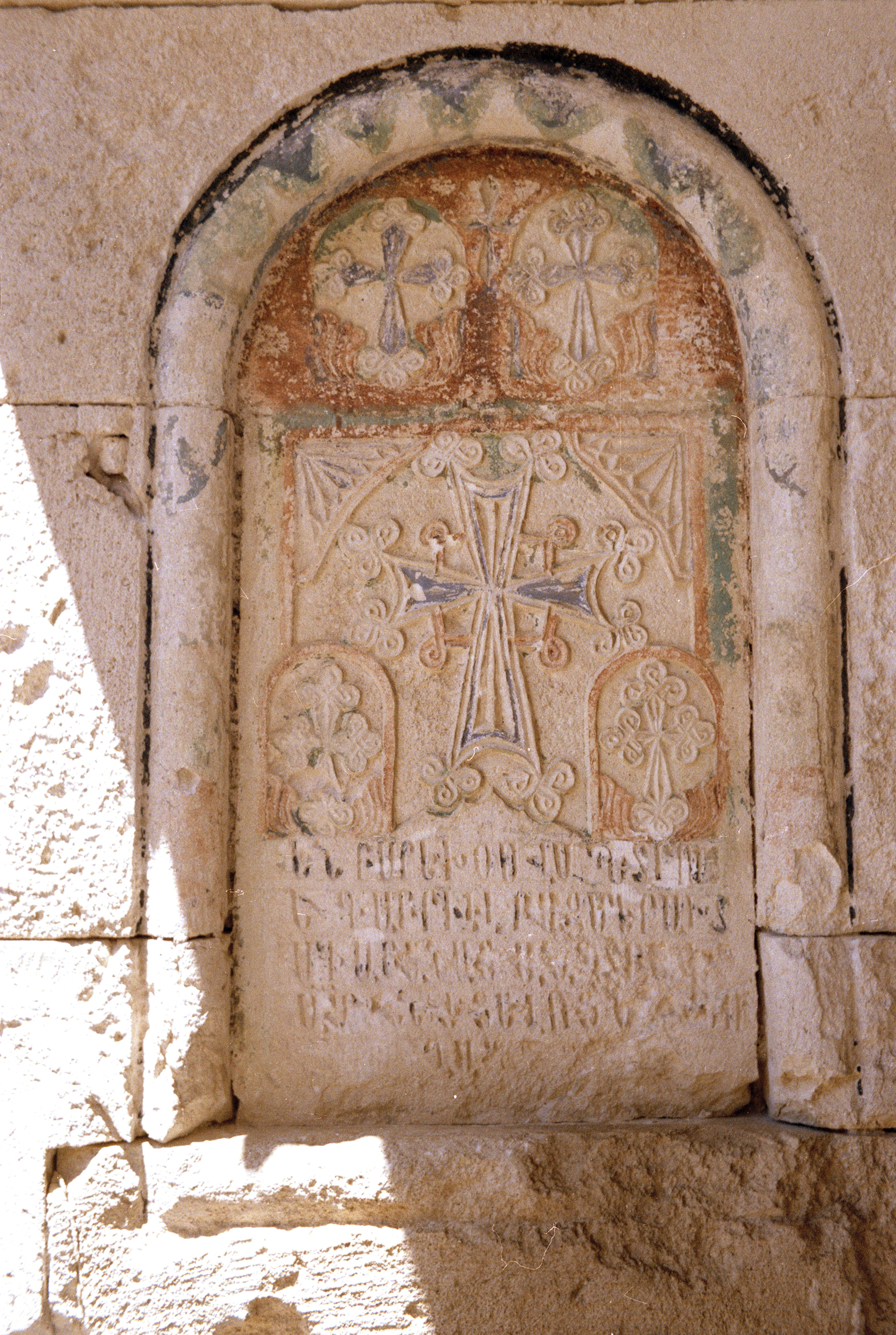
Armenian cross-stone at the monastery

== See also ==
- Armenian Cathedral of the Holy Cross
- Adir Island
