= Arpiar Arpiarian =

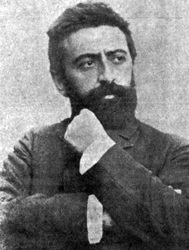
Arpiar Arpiarian

Arpiar Arpiarian (Armenian: Արփիար Արփիարեան; December 21, 1851 – February 12, 1908) was a writer and a political activist from the Ottoman Empire. He was the pioneer of realism in Armenian literature.

== Early life and education ==
Arpiar Arpiarian was born in 1851 aboard a ship as his parents, who were originally from Akn (an Armenian town on shore of the Euphrates prior to the Armenian genocide), were traveling from Samsun to Constantinople. The family settled in the suburb of Ortaköy, where Arpiar attended the Tarkmanchats (Թարգմանչաց) Armenian school. In 1867, he was sent to Venice to attend the Moorat-Raphael College (Մուրատ-Ռափայէլեան) school. At Moorat-Raphael, he studied Armenian language and history under the tutelage of Ghevont Alishan. He also became familiarized with French and Italian literature. He graduated from the school and returned to Constantinople where he was offered a secretarial position at the Armenian Patriarchate. During this time, he also worked as an accountant. However, Arpiarian's true calling was journalism and literature.

== Work in newspapers and visit to Tiflis ==
His first works in literature started in Grigor Artsruni's Mshak (Մշակ) newspaper, which was published in Tiflis. He would write articles under the pen name "Haygag" (Հայկակ) about various aspects of Armenian life in Constantinople, all of which were flavored with satire. By 1878, he had already become a regular contributor to dailies and periodicals, mainly in Masis, of which he was an editor (1884-1893) alongside famed Armenian writer and politician Krikor Zohrab. His articles became very popular among Caucasian Armenians. In 1884, he visited Tiflis on the occasion of the election of a new Catholicos in Echmiadzin where he was received as a renowned writer. There, he had the occasion to meet Eastern Armenian authors Raffi, Proshian, Aghayan and others.

Upon his return to Constantinople with new impressions and information, he wrote a series of articles entitled Ughevorutiun i Kovkasia (Ուղեւորութիւն ի Կովկասիա, Travels in the Caucasus). In 1884, alongside other intellectuals, he launched a new daily called Arevelk (Արեւելք, Orient) with the aim of promoting closer relations between Eastern and Western Armenians. Arevelk, which was a literary and political newspaper with democratic tendencies, attracted a number of young writers who would form the core of the school of realism. The paper was published until 1912.

== Political activism ==
Along with being a writer, Arpiar Arpiarian was a political activist and revolutionary who supported reforms in the Ottoman Empire in light of Sultan Abdul Hamid II's treatment of the Armenian population. In 1889, Arpiarian joined the Social Democrat Hunchakian Party and founded the Ararat Society with a group of youths to spread education in the Ottoman provinces. In 1890, he participated in the Kum Kapu demonstration and was arrested as a revolutionary with a number of other Hunchakians and jailed for two months. He was released in a general amnesty. In 1891, he founded and became editor of the daily Hayrenik (Հայրենիք, Fatherland) with his friend, Hovhannes Shahnazarian. This paper was suppressed by the sultan for its democratic ideas.

=== Escape from Hamidian massacres ===
In 1896, the Hamidian massacres began and in order to escape the fate of other Armenians, he fled Constantinople to London. In London, he attempted to publish two monthly reviews, Mart (Մարտ, Battle) and Nor Kyank (Նոր Կեանք, New life) in which Levon Pashalian would contribute, both papers being sponsored by the Hunchakians. At this time, the political party split. Arpiarian reorganized one of the factions, Veragazmial Hunchakianner, into a viable entity but would eventually leave the party. With this decision, he ultimately created enemies from within his old entourage.

== Travel to Cairo and assassination ==
In 1901–1902, he traveled to Paris and then Venice where he wrote his most successful work, the novella Garmir Jamuts (Կարմիր Ժամուց, The Crimson Offering). In 1905, he traveled to Cairo. In Cairo, he edited the literary monthly review Shirag (Շիրակ) and contributed in the local paper, Lusaper (Լուսաբեր, Lucifer: light-bearer).

In 1908, his political enemies assassinated him while Arpiarian was returning home from the market.

== Legacy and works ==
Arpiarian is considered the founder of realism in modern Armenian literature, the leader of a literary movement without an established school. While many writers were into romanticism at the time, he introduced a new trend that revolutionized Armenian literature. He gained the confidence of his readers by expressing his thoughts honestly and without shame. He was the mentor of an entire generation of Armenian realist writers such as Tigran Kamsarakan, Levon Pashalian and Erukhan.

Most of his literary work is written in short story form and deals with the working classes and social issues. Some of his better known stories are:

- Hoku zavag (Հոգու զավակ, The adopted child)
- Vosgi abrchan (Ոսկի ապրջան, The gold bracelet)
- Yerazi me kine (Երազի մը գինը, The price of a dream)
- Gadag me (Կատակ մը, A joke)
- Abushe (Ապուշը, The idiot)
- Garmir Jamuts (Կարմիր ժամուց, The crimson offering)
- Kevork Marzbeduni (Գէորգ Մարզպետունի, Gevork Marzpetuni)

== Sources ==
- Encyclopedia of world literature in the 20th century, by Leonard S. Klein, Steven Serafin, Walter D. Glanze, 1993, p. 120
- Concise Armenian Encyclopedia, Ed. by acad. K. Khudaverdyan, Yerevan, 1990, Vol. 1, p. 426.
- The Heritage of Armenian Literature: From The Eighteenth Century To Modern Times, by Agop J. Hacikyan, Gabriel Basmajian, Edward S. Franchuk, p. 452
