= Erukhan =

Armenian writer

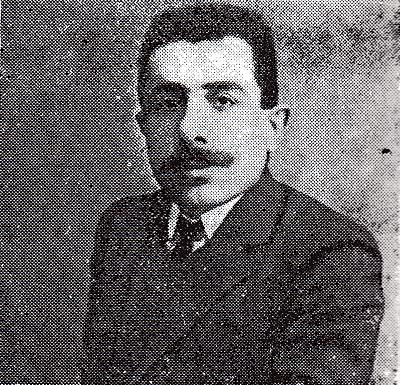
- Born: Yervant Srmakeshkhanlian; 1870; Constantinople (now Istanbul)
- Died: 1915 (aged 44–45); Outside the city of Kharberd
- Cause of death: Victim of Armenian genocide
- Occupation: writer

Yervant Srmakeshkhanlian (Armenian: Երուանդ Սրմաքէշխանլեան; 1870 – 1915), known by his pen name Erukhan (Armenian: Երուխան) or Yerukhan, was an Armenian writer of late 19th and early 20th centuries. He was killed during the Armenian genocide.

== Life ==
Erukhan was born in 1870 in the city of Constantinople (Istanbul). He received his childhood education from the Nersesian institution, an old and shabby building serving as a school. Erukhan based one of his humorous characters in the novel “The Lord’s Daughter” (Armenian: Ամիրային Աղջիկը) on the school’s principal: Constantine Abantarian. As a student, Erukhan was said to be a lazy and weak student. He had a particular distaste for mathematics, saying that the first individuals that he detested in his life were his mathematics teachers.

In 1886, Erukhan's father pushed him to pursue a career in medicine but a family friend persuaded him to enroll his son in the newly opened Central College (Armenian: Կեդրոնական Վարժարան). Erukhan enrolled in the school, but he was unable to be a first-rate student. Ironically, he was even mediocre in Armenian literature. Erukhan fell ill during the end of year exam session and was unable to write his exams. His appeal for make up examinations was refused and he dropped out of the institution.

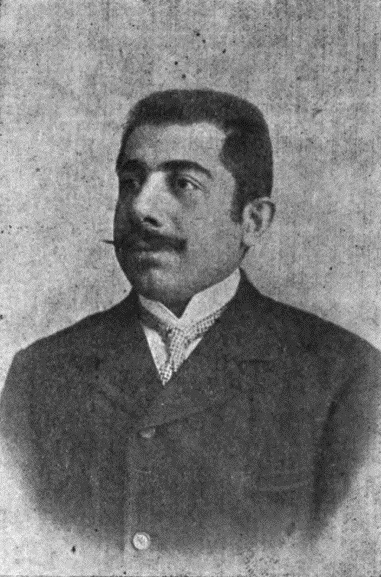
Erukhan

Being from a poor family, Erukhan was forced to quickly find work. He worked for a week alongside a trader before being fired supposedly because he “wasn’t the man for the job”. During the next two years, Erukhan devoted himself to reading a multitude of novels from various European and Armenian writers, he also became fluent in the French language. He then joined the editing team of the newspaper East (Armenian: Արեւելք) as translator. He eventually started writing his own material, and his talent was spotted by the great Armenian writers of the time Zohrab and Arpiarian. Erukhan was encouraged to continue writing and his works were continually published in the newspapers East (Armenian: Արեւելք) and Masis (Armenian: Մասիս).

In 1896, during the Hamidian massacres, Erukhan fled the country, alongside many other Armenian intellectuals. He settled in Bulgaria, where he wrote for the newspaper Shavigh (Armenian: Շաւիղ) and worked as a teacher as well. In 1904, Erukhan moved to Egypt where he took charge of the editing of Light Bringer (Armenian: Լուսաբեր) newspaper. He married one of his former students in 1905.

== Works ==
The Lord’s Daughter (Amirayin aghchige, Armenian: Ամիրային աղջիկը) is possibly one of the best works in Western Armenian literature. The author portrays a tragedy about the disparity between two classes of Armenians living in Constantinople.

The Legitimate Son (Harazad vortin, Armenian: Հարազատ որդին) is a spiritual novel about a husband who thinks his wife has wronged him and that their son is therefore illegitimate. The father is tormented about the thought and finally commits suicide.

Erukhan wrote many short stories describing the hard yet simple life of fishermen, firemen and porters. These works were gathered and published in Paris in 1942. He also had many published articles throughout the years in various newspapers.

== Writing style ==
Erukhan can be classified as a realist that came from a younger generation of Armenian writers. He was preceded by Zohrab and other realist novelists. In a career spanning a quarter century, he wrote approximately sixty short novels and two novels. Erukhan's stories are of great value to historians because he was able to depict in great details the daily setting of many characters. His accurate descriptions have become a form of documented history of those specific individuals and their respective environment. Erukhan provides great insight into the careers, social norms, social hierarchy, ideologies and even gossip of that specific era. This author didn’t look to the aristocracy for his storylines, but instead embraced the commoner as his main source of character depictions. The reader truly feels the joys and the pains of these common people in his novels.

Erukhan was convinced that work and hard labor truly molded men into better people and made them better able to appreciate life. The ones that struggled to bring food on the table were purer of heart than those who did not, according to him. Erukhan truly did sympathize with the poor, but did recognize their bravery and their resolute nature. His stories can be seen as a sort of homage to those who have never received any.

Erukhan's language is usually simple but it does sometimes get clogged with a more difficult vocabulary and many nuanced comparisons. The influence of other prominent writers of his époque can be seen in some of his writings.

== Death ==
Erukhan returned to Constantinople in 1908, where he became principal of his former school: the Central College. Five years later, he moved to Kharberd (Nor Kyurin) (Armenian: Խարբերդ) where he took an administrative role in a local school. 24 April 1915 signaled the start of the Armenian Genocide. Erukhan, along with a priest, was arrested and thrown in jail shortly after that date. They were tortured for many days, after which they were chained and made to walk to streets of Kharberd. The Turkish soldiers herded them outside the city and shot Erukhan and the priest. His wife and two children were killed in the death marches leading to the Deir ez-Zor camps in Syria. (Note: "His entire family perished in the death march to the Syrian desert.")

== Sources ==
- Hacikyan, Agop Jack; Basmajian, Gabriel; Franchuk, Edward S.; Ouzounian, Nourhan, eds. (2005). The Heritage of Armenian Literature: From the eighteenth century to modern times. Vol. III. Wayne State University Press.
- Kévorkian, Raymond (2011). The Armenian Genocide: A Complete History. I.B. Tauris.

== See also ==
- Armenian genocide
- Armenian notables deported from the Ottoman capital in 1915
- Krikor Zohrab
- Medzn Mourad
