= Karapet Utudjian =

Armenian journalist, publicist, and writer

Garabed Utudjian (Armenian: Կարապետ Իւթիւճեան; 1823 in Constantinople, Ottoman Empire – 1904) was a prominent Armenian journalist, translator, and writer.

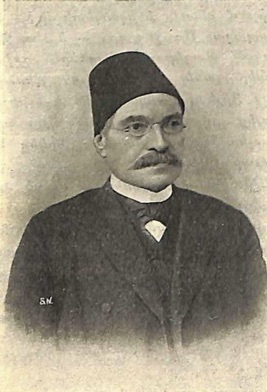
Garabed Utujian, undated photo

In the 1840s, Utujian taught history, geography, Classical Armenian and French in a series of Armenian schools in Constantinople and worked as a private tutor in the homes of two wealthy Armenian families. In 1848, he traveled to Paris and studied at the École supérieure de commerce, where he specialized in economics and earned a diploma in 1851. During his time in Paris, he also attended lectures by the critic Saint-Marc Girardin, the political economist Michel Chevalier and the historian Jules Michelet at the Sorbonne and the Collège de France. Before returning to Constantinople, Utujian traveled to London and visited the Great Exhibition, the first World Fair.

In 1852, Utujian was appointed editor of the long-running Ottoman-Armenian newspaper Masis. He served as its editor uninterrupted for 32 years until 1884 when, after having lost an eye to disease, he was forced to cease all work in the realms of writing and publishing. In his role as editor of Masis, Utujian is credited with helping to shape journalistic norms for the Ottoman Armenian press and with helping to develop modern Armenian as a written medium. In honor of his longtime service to journalism and letters, he was awarded the Ottoman Order of the Medjidie (third class) in 1903.

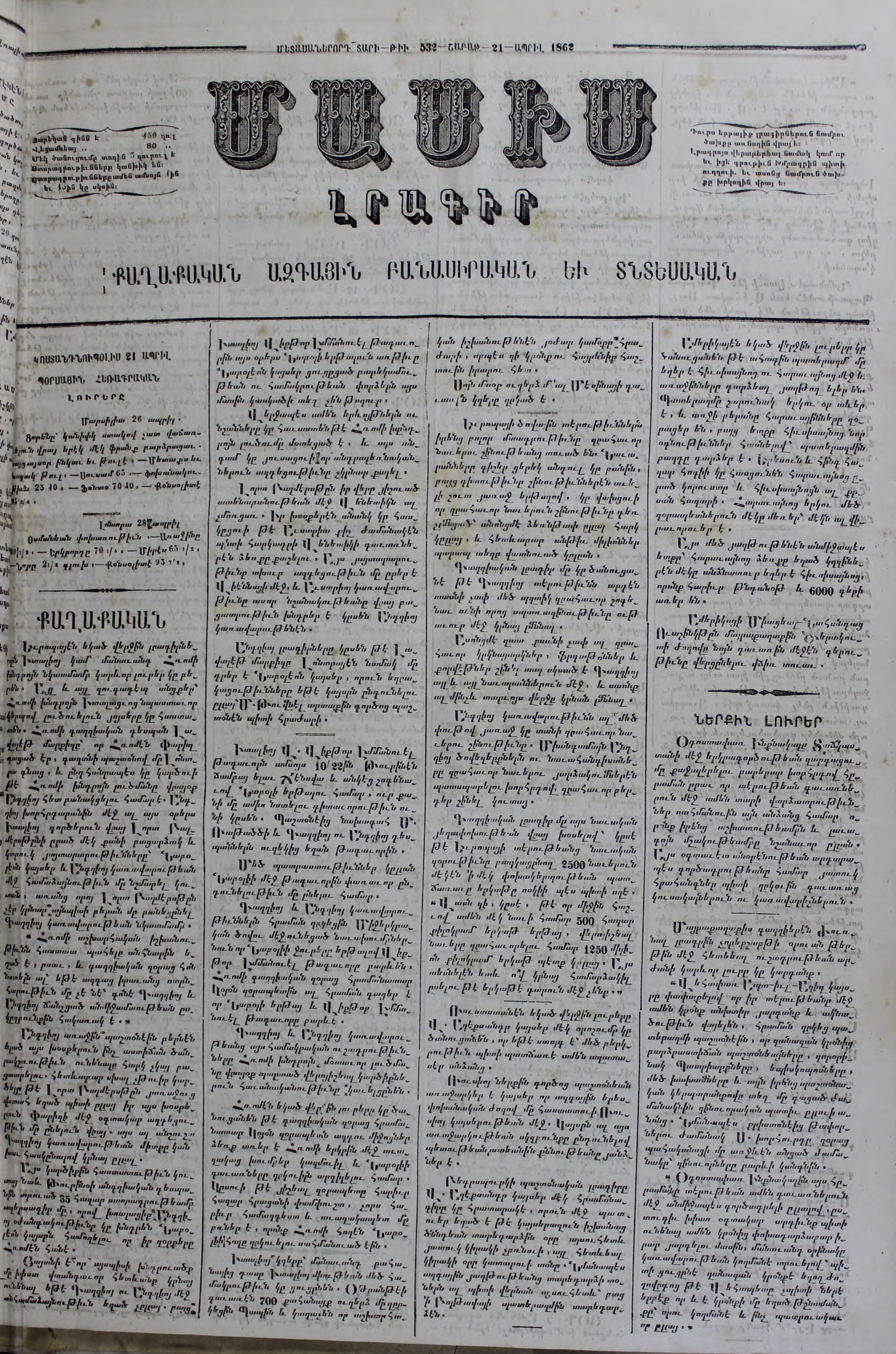
Front page of an issue of Utudjian's Masis

During his time as editor, Utujian published a number of translations from European languages, many of which were also serialized in Masis. Among these translations figure schoolbooks such as Joseph Garnier’s Éléments de l’économie politique (1873), as well as popular European literary and political works: Silvio Pellico’s My Prisons (1862), Oliver Goldsmith’s The vicar of Wakefield (1863) and Eugène Sue’s eight-volume Le Juif errant (1867-1869). Concurrently, he also held a series of positions within Armenian communal governing bodies. Like Rusinian, he was an inaugural member of the Education Council in 1853, served as a deputy in the Armenian National Assembly and was part of cultural associations that strove to spread a sense of national consciousness among Ottoman Armenians. He also belonged to the Armenian masonic lodge Ser (“Love”). After leaving his editorship, Utujian worked as the superintendent of schools affiliated with the Armenian Apostolic Patriarchate of Constantinople from 1885 to 1895.

Utujian serialized his own childhood memories in Masis in seven installments between 27 February and 17 April 1893.
