= Adır Island =

Largest island in Lake Van in Turkey

Coordinates: 38°52′00″N 43°21′00″E

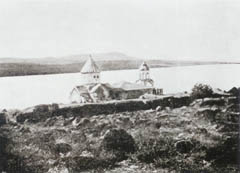
The Monastery from North-East

Adır Island (Turkish: Adır Adası) or Lim Island (Armenian: Լիմ կղզի, romanized: Lim kghzi), is the largest island in Lake Van, located in the northeastern side of the lake. During the Armenian genocide upwards of 12,000 Armenian women and children, crossed to the isle over a period of three days while a few dozen men covered their retreat from Hamidiye regiments. The situation soon became critical because of a lack of food.

Lim Monastery was built by Armenians over the centuries on the island, with Armenian sources indicating the monastery was already founded pre-884, with tradition saying that St. Gregory the Illuminator himself founded it in the 4th century. By the 14th century there were Surp Astvatsatsin, Surp Garabed and Surp Kevork churches. In 1766 the belltower, a chapel and a parish house were built. The monastery functioned until 1918, and has deteriorated ever since. The large, intricate curtain from one of the altars is preserved in very good condition at the museum of San Lazzaro Island in Venice.

== Gallery ==
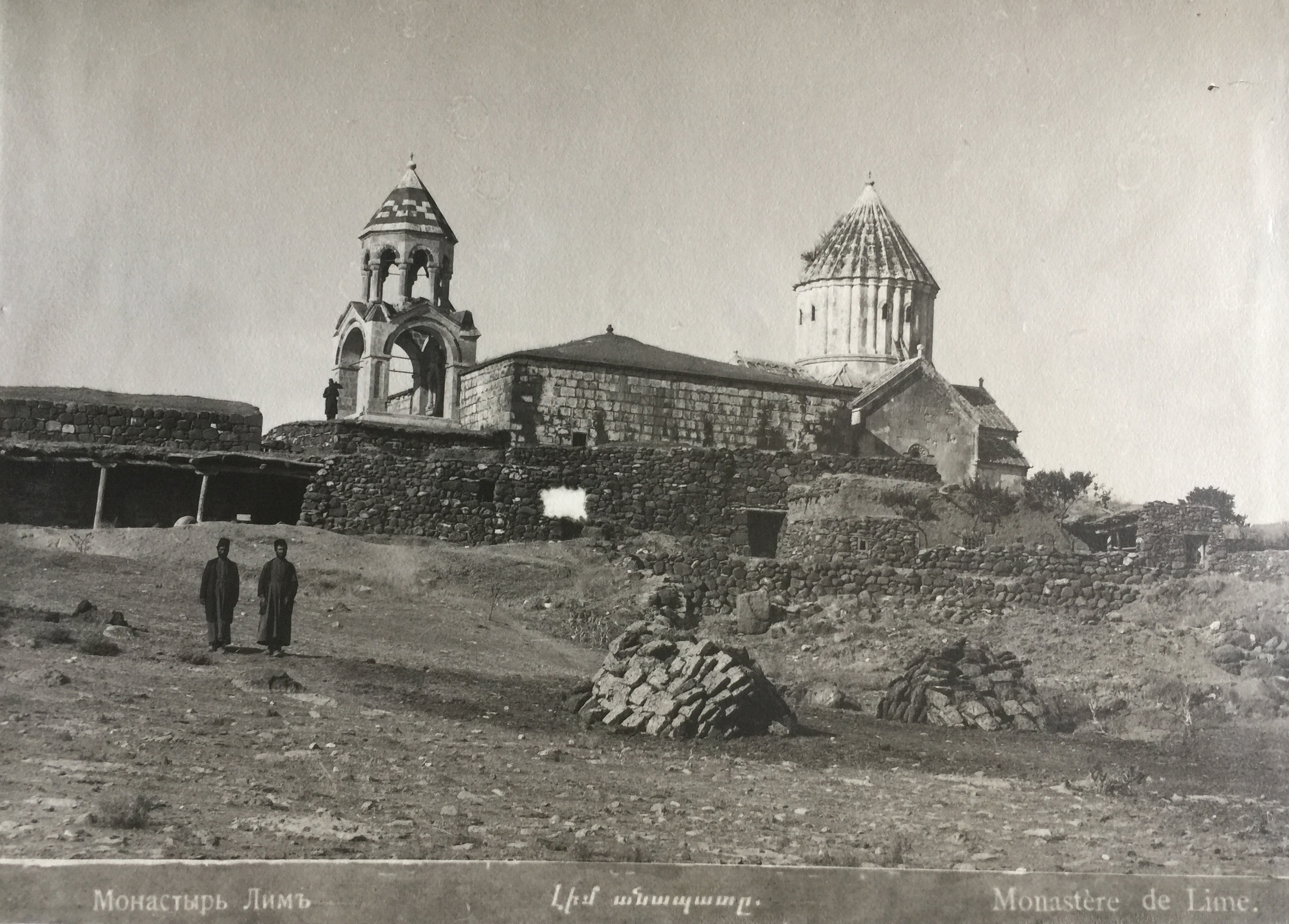

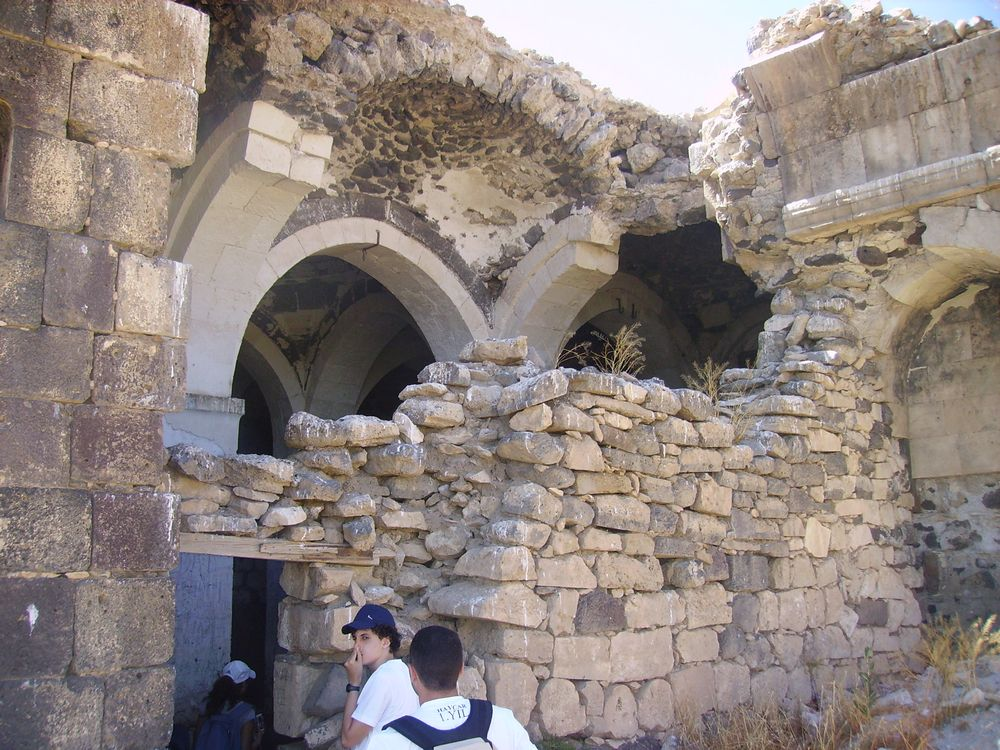
Lim Armenian Monastery in 2009

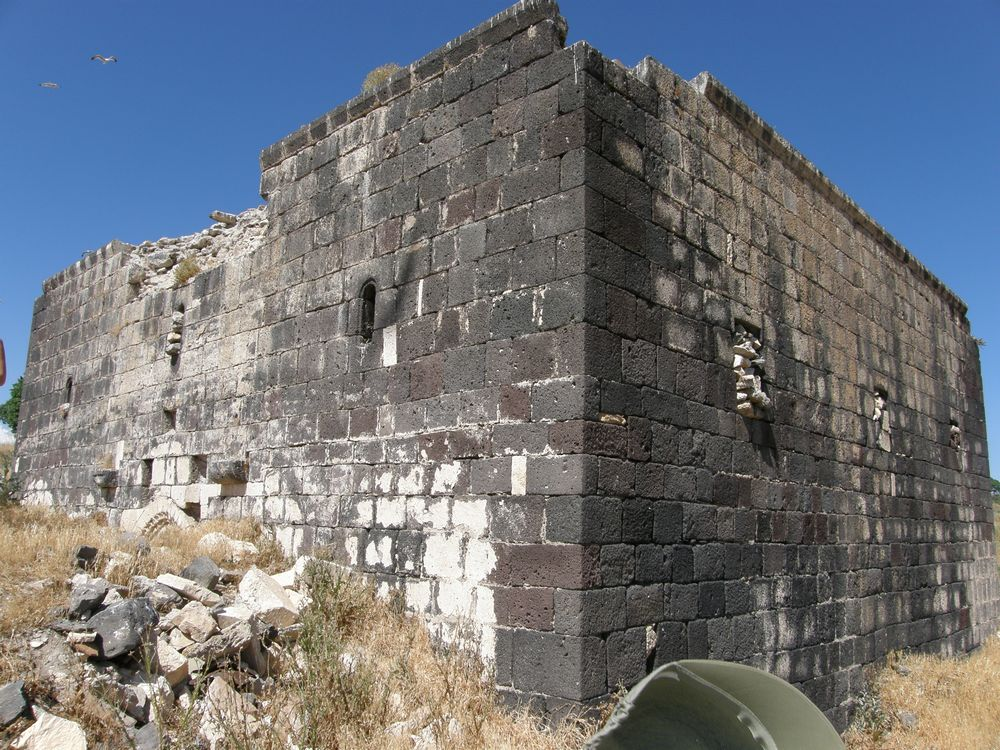
Lim Armenian Monastery in 2009

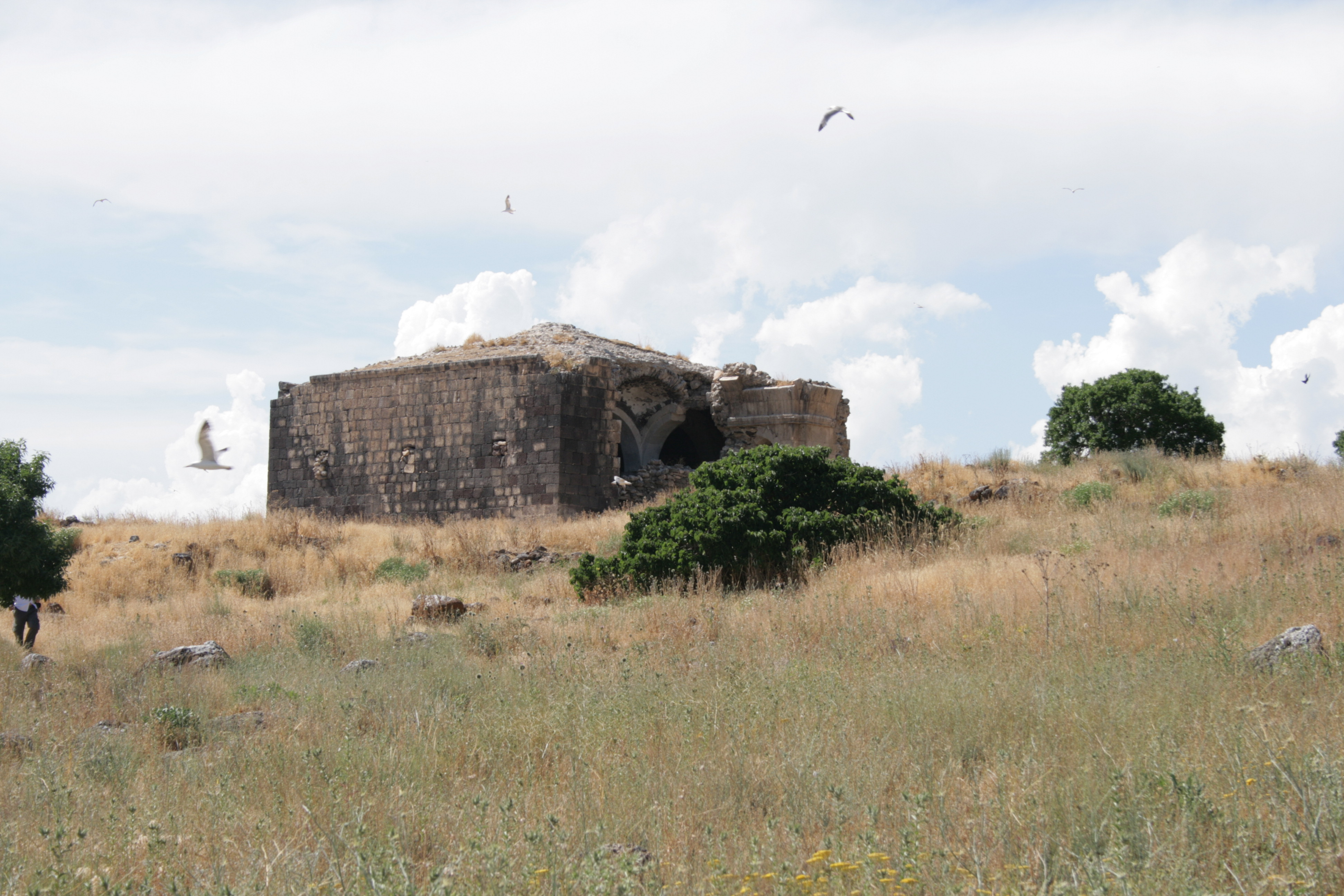
Lim Armenian Monastery in 2009

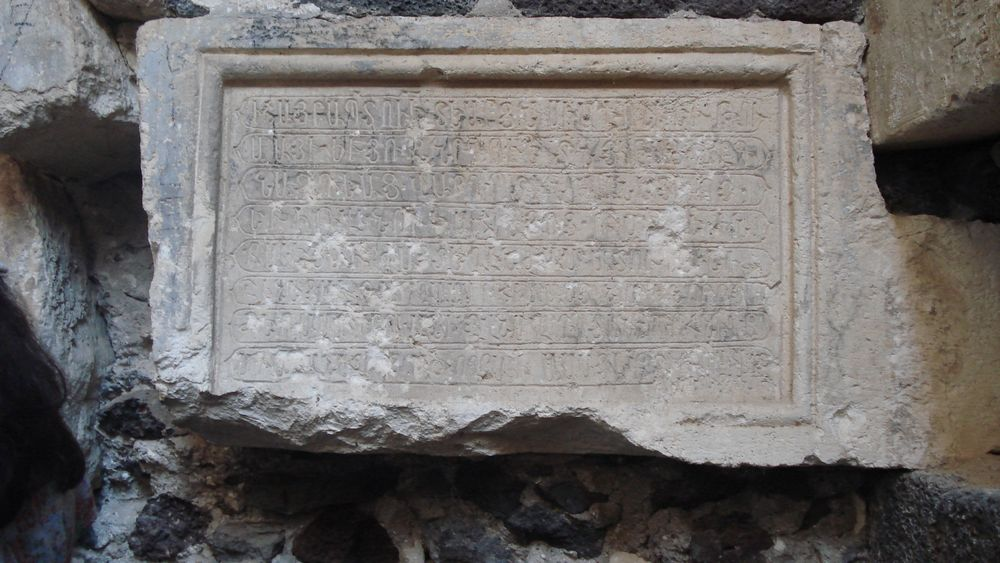
Armenian writing on the Monastery in 2009

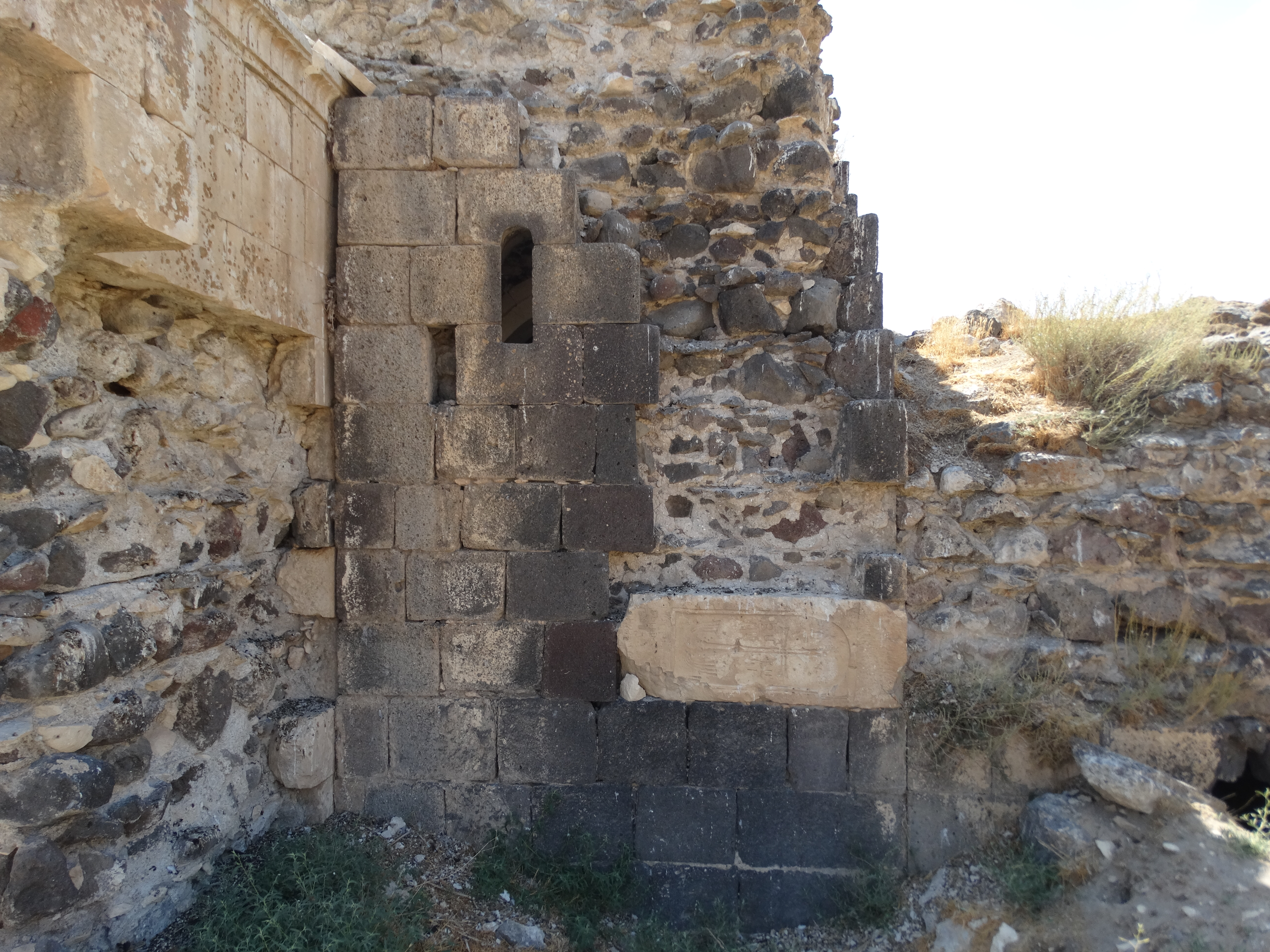
Built-in khachkar

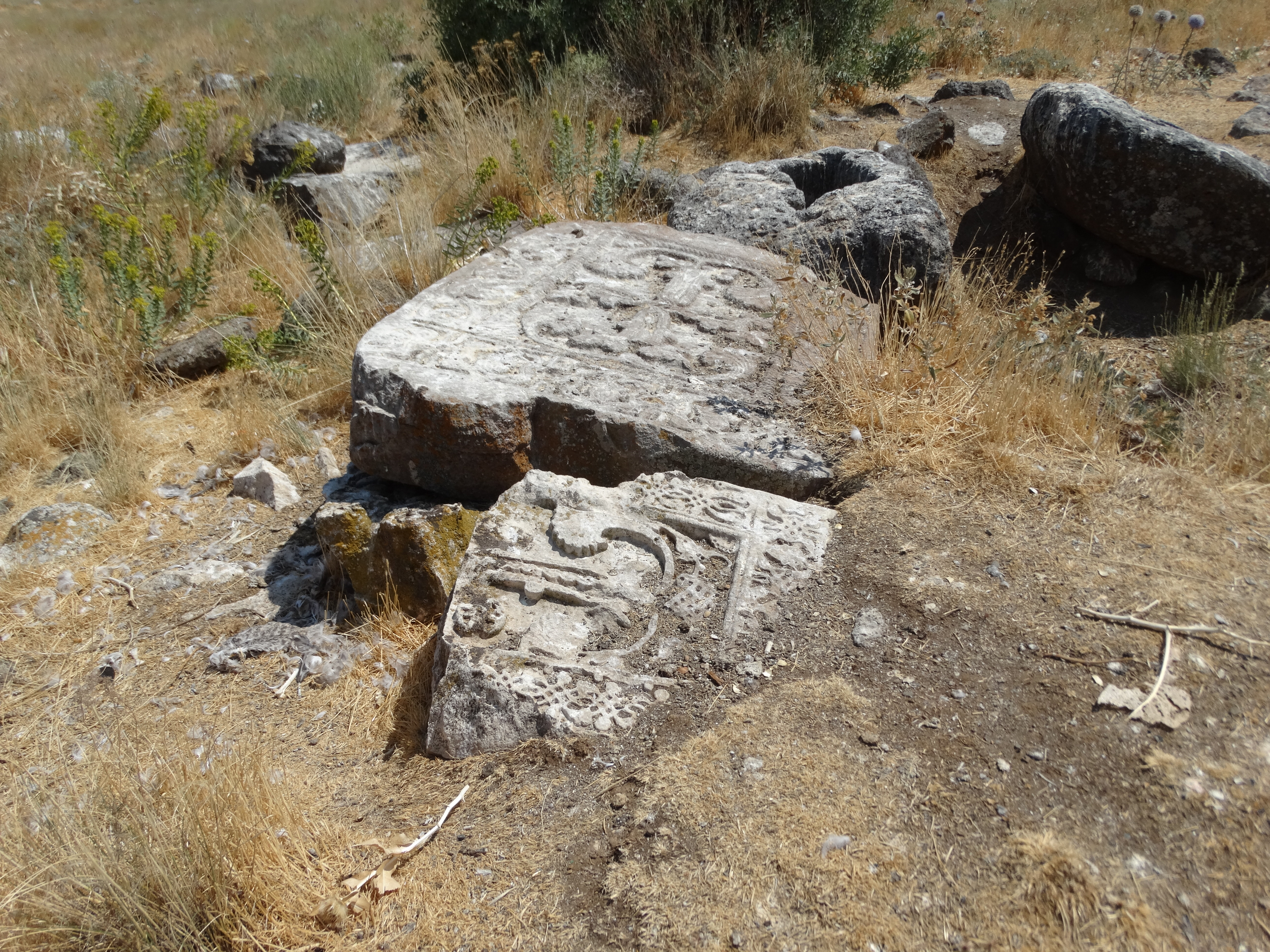
Remains of a khachkar near the church

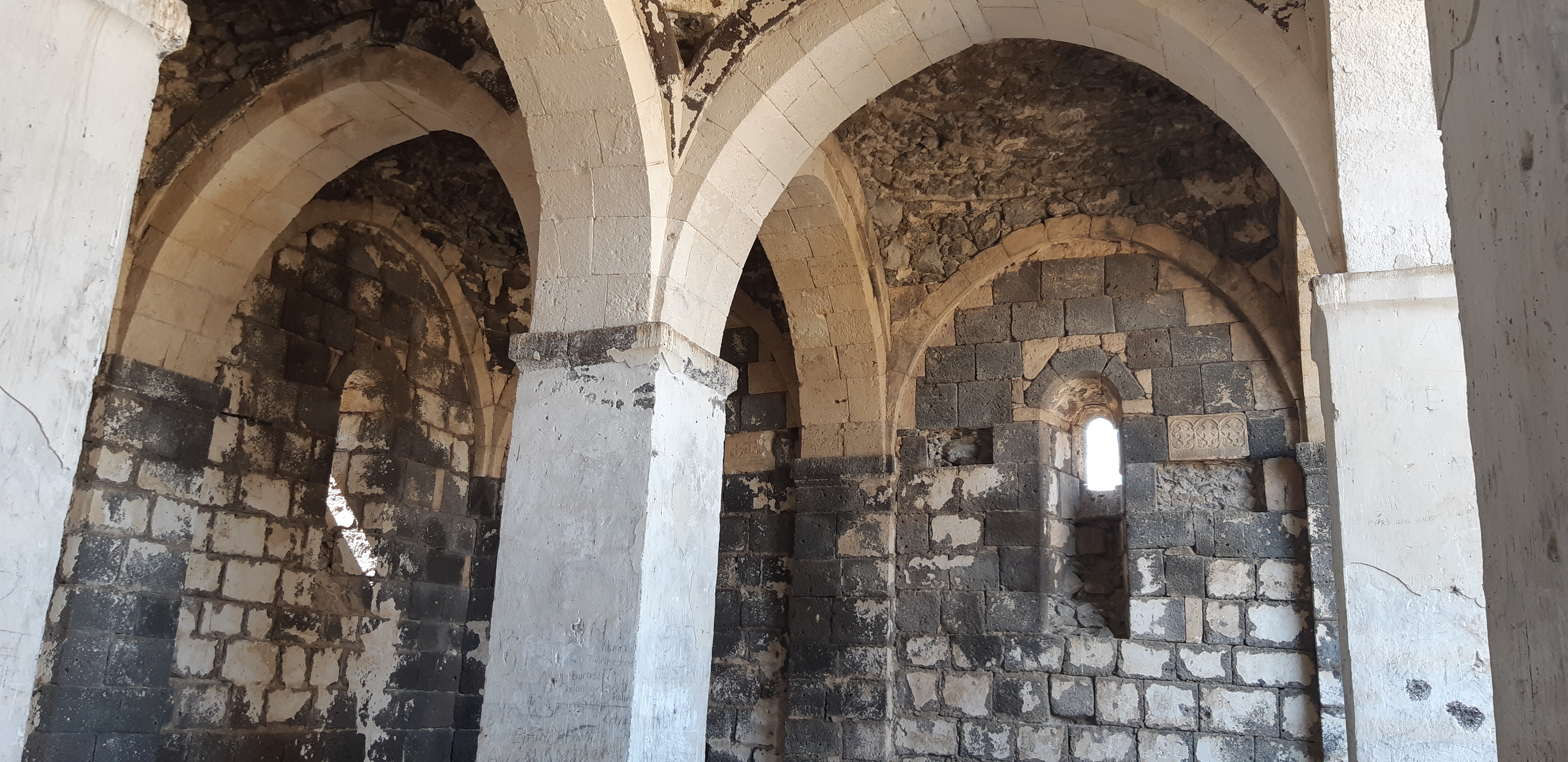
Internal view of the church 2021

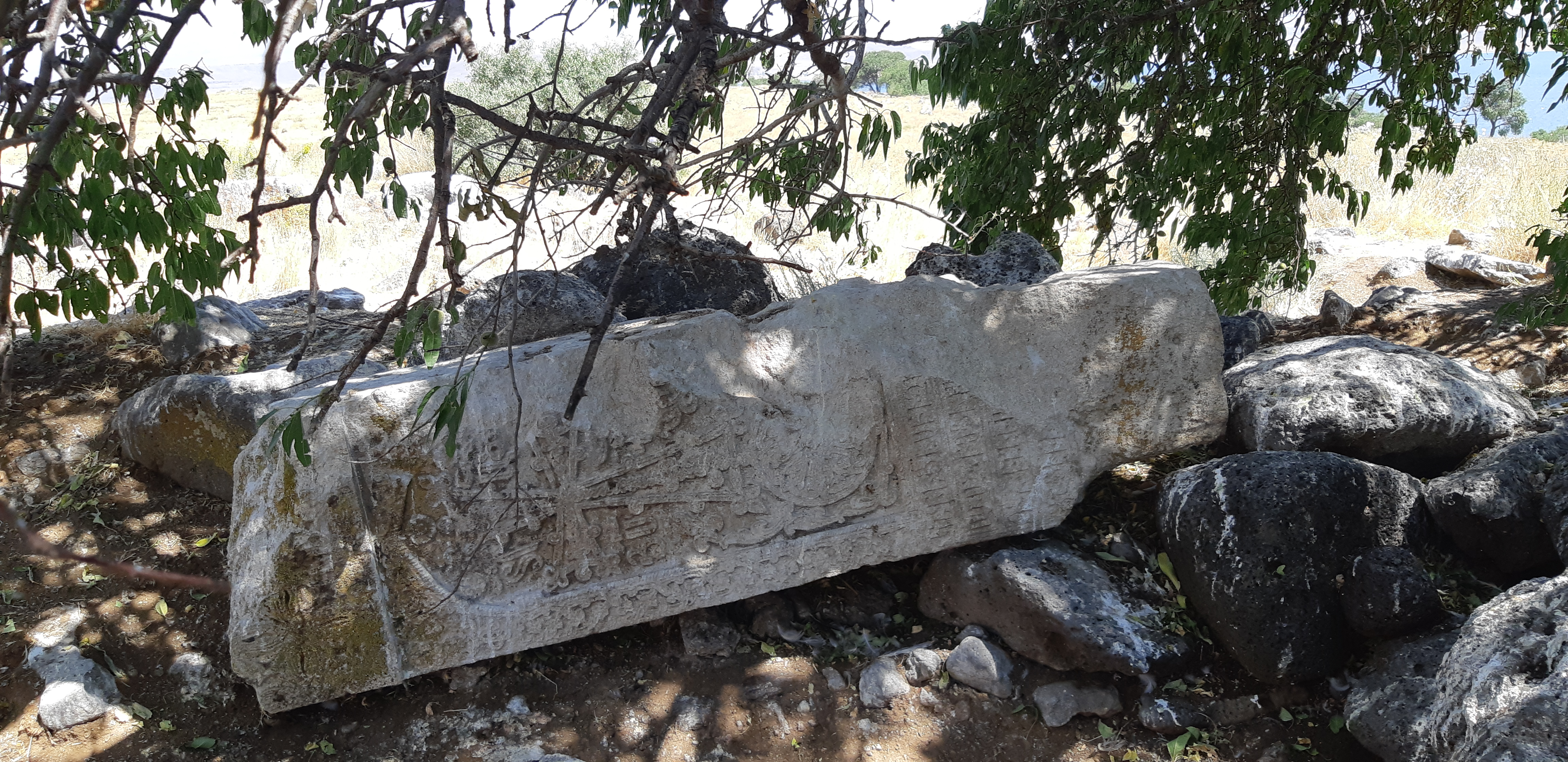
Lying khachkar

== See also ==
- Cathedral of the Holy Cross, Aghtamar
- Ktuts Monastery
