= Noyakert =

Noyakert Նոյակերտ
- Location within Armenia Location within Ararat
- Coordinates: 39°49′00″N 44°40′01″E
- Country: Armenia
- Province: Ararat
- Municipality: Ararat

Population (2011)
  - Total: 1,634
- Time zone: UTC+4
  - Summer (DST): UTC+5

Noyakert (Armenian: Նոյակերտ) is a village in the Ararat Municipality of the Ararat Province of Armenia.
