= Norakert =

Village in Armavir, Armenia

Norakert Նորակերտ
- Location within Armenia
- Coordinates: 40°11′32″N 44°20′48″E
- Country: Armenia
- Province: Armavir
- Founded: 1946

Population (2011)
  - Total: 2,739
- Time zone: UTC+4 ( )
  - Summer (DST): UTC+5 ( )

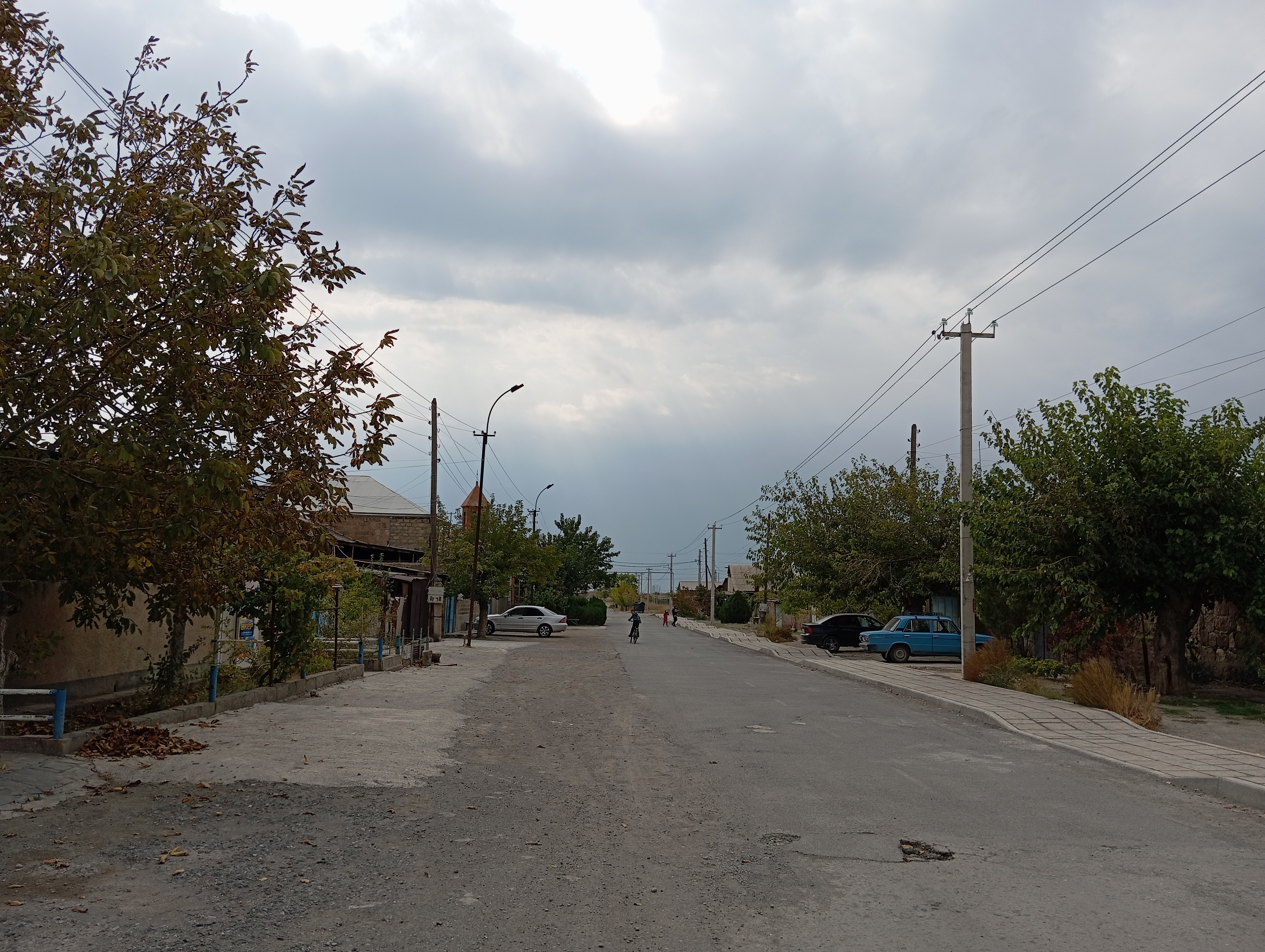
Norakert village, Vagharshapat, Armavir province, Armenia.

Norakert (Armenian: Նորակերտ) is a town in the Armavir Province of Armenia.

== See also ==
- Armavir Province
