= Şahinkaya =

Şahinkaya is a Turkish name meaning "buzzard rock". It may refer to the following people and places:

== People ==
- Tahsin Şahinkaya (1925-2013), Turkish Air Force general
- Hayrullah Şahinkaya (born 1934), Turkish wrestler
- Coşkun Şahinkaya (born 1942), Turkish footballer
- Bülent Şahinkaya (1948-2009), Turkish footballer
- Güngör Şahinkaya (born 1954), Turkish footballer
- Levent Sahinkaya (born 1959), Turkish ambassador

== Places ==
- Şahinkaya, Çorum
- Şahinkaya, Elazığ, a quarter of the city Elazığ, Turkey
- Şahinkaya, Sındırgı, a village in Turkey
- old name of Sokolovo, Lovech Province, a village in Bulgaria
