= Elazığ =

Municipality in Eastern Anatolia, Turkey

- Municipality
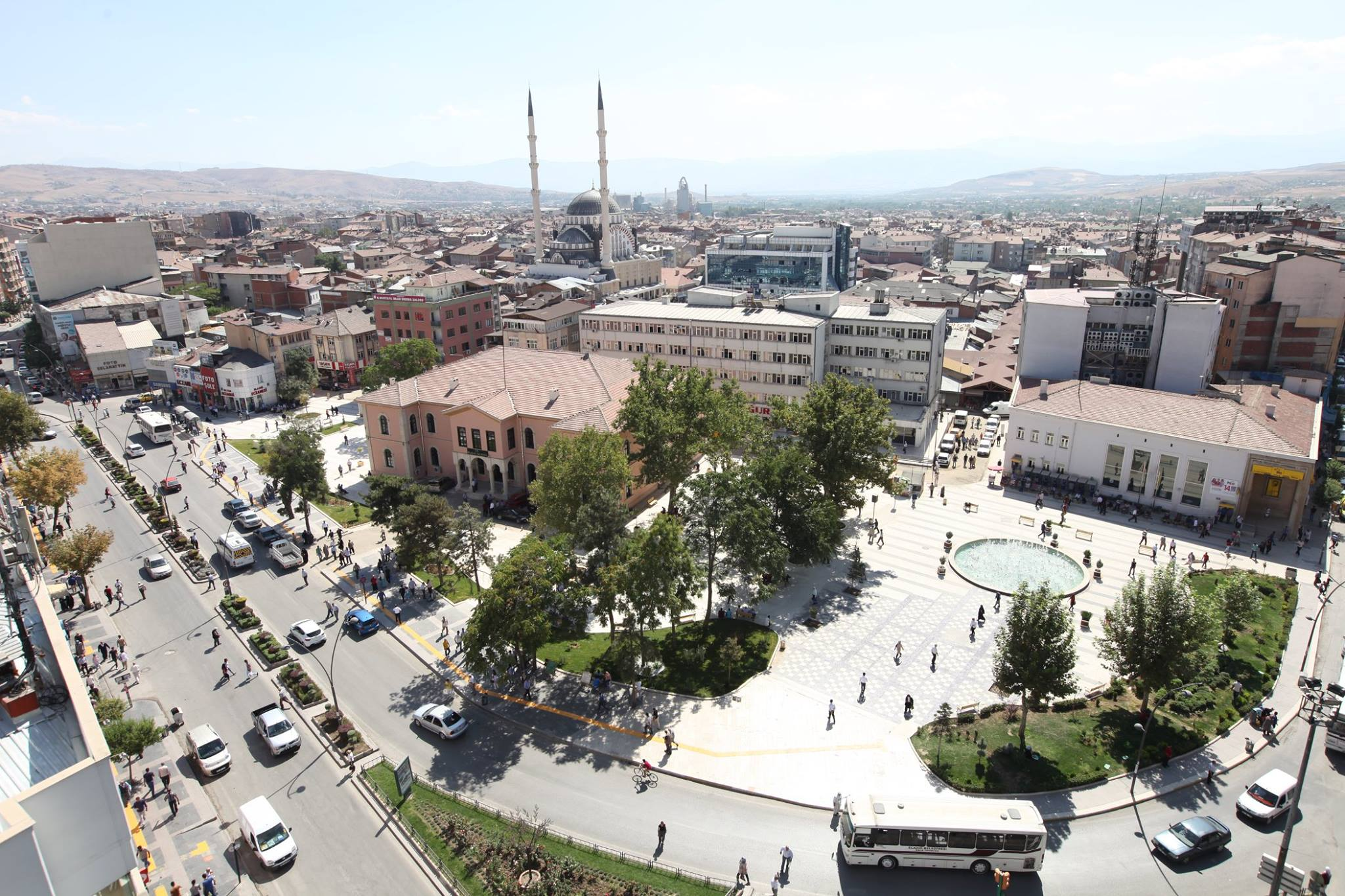
- A view of the city centre

- Coat of arms

- Location within Turkey
- Coordinates: 38°40′28″N 39°13′22″E
- Country: Turkey
- Province: Elazığ
- District: Elazığ

Government
  - Mayor: Şahin Şerifoğulları (AKP)
- Elevation: 1,067 m (3,501 ft)
- Population (2022): 387,072
- Time zone: UTC+3 (TRT)
- Postal code: 23000
- Area code: 0424
- Website: www.elazig.bel.tr

Elazığ (Turkish pronunciation: [eˈlazɯː]) is a city in the Eastern Anatolia region of Turkey, and the administrative centre of Elazığ Province and Elazığ District. Founded in and around the former city of Harput, it is located in the uppermost Euphrates valley. The plain on which the city extends has an altitude of 1,067 metres (3,501 ft). Elazığ resembles an inland peninsula surrounded by the natural Lake Hazar and reservoirs of Keban Dam, Karakaya Dam, Kıralkızı and Özlüce. Its population is 387,072 (2022).

== Name ==
=== Mezre ===
Elazığ was once a suburb of the ancient fortress town of Harput called Mezre. Heinrich Hübschmann believed Mezre to be the settlement of Mazara (Μαζάρα) mentioned by Ptolemy, while Nicholas Adontz derived the name from an Arabic word meaning arable land or hamlet (borrowed into Turkish as mezra 'hamlet'). The toponym Mezre originated as a shortening of Ağavat Mezrası ('hamlet of the aghas/landlords') or Mezra-ı Çötelizade ('Çötelizade [a family name] hamlet'). This may be explained by the fact that some notables from Harput had been exiled from the city and settled in nearby villages in the late 18th century.

=== Harput ===
Some Armenians from Harput (Armenian: Խարբերդ, romanized: Kharberd) are said to have settled on the site in 1617, so Elazığ was sometimes called Nor Kharberd (lit. 'New Harput') in Armenian. The Kurdish name is Xarpêt. The name of the city in Syriac is Karput (ܟܪܦܘܬ) or Khartbert (ܟܪܬܒܪܬ).

=== Elazığ ===
With the creation of the Mamuret-ul-Aziz vilayet of the Ottoman Empire, the name Mamuret-ul-Aziz came into use as a name alternative for the city. This name quickly evolved into al-Aziz (Turkish: Elaziz; Kurdish: Elezîz). In 1937, through an order from Mustafa Kemal Atatürk, this name was Turkified as Elazık (Turkish pronunciation: [eˈlazɯk]), but due to difficulties in its pronunciation, it was finally accepted as Elazığ.

== History ==
The town of Mezre (future Elazığ) was founded on the fertile plain below the hill on which the much older fortress and settlement of Harput were constructed. It was located about five kilometres (three miles) southwest of Harput. The Hurrians, who settled in this area in c. 2000 BC, are the earliest known inhabitants of the area. Harput and its surrounding region were part of the kingdom of Urartu at its maximum extent, and the Urartians may have been the first to build a fortress here. Historian Hakob Manandian believed it to have been the main fortress of the earlier Hayasa-Azzi confederation. It is possible that Harput stands on or is near the site of Carcathiocerta (more commonly identified with Eğil), the first capital of the Kingdom of Sophene. The early Muslim geographers knew Harput as Ḥiṣn Ziyād ("the fortress of Ziyād"), but the Armenian name, Khartabirt or Kharbirt, whence Kharput and Harput, was generally adopted in time.

=== Ottoman Harput and Mamûretü'l-Azîz ===
Harput and its vicinity fell under Turkish control in the year 1085 as a result of the Battle of Manzikert, which took place on August 26, 1071. The region around the fortress changed hands frequently in the subsequent centuries, coming under the control of the Çubukoğulları, Artuqids, Sultanate of Rum, Ilkhanate, Beylik of Dulkadir, Aq Qoyunlu, Safavids and Ottomans.

According to an official history written in 1883, Mezre was originally a small hamlet near Harput which served as the official residence of the Çötelizades, one of the notable families exiled from Harput in the 1780s-90s. In 1834–36, the Çötelizades hosted the governor and military commander Reşid Mehmed Pasha, who turned the hamlet into a garrison for his campaigns in the eastern regions of the empire. In the 1850s and 60s, Mezre grew into a small town or suburb of Harput with a prosperous Armenian bourgeoisie. In 1869, an Armenian named Krikor Ipekjian (later Fabrikatorian) founded a silk factory in Mezre. In 1878, it was made the administrative centre of the Mamuret-ul-Aziz Vilayet (commonly referred to as the Harput Vilayet). According to census data from the 1880s, the population of Mezre consisted of 2,126 non-Muslim and 548 Muslim inhabitants, making it the only vilayet centre with an Armenian majority besides Van. Meanwhile, Harput proper had a population of 12,974 people (5,125 were non-Muslim and 7,849 Muslim). The populous villages on the plain below also had mixed Armenian-Muslim populations. The population of Mezre were mainly merchants, craftsmen and bureaucrats.

In 1892, the Armenian National Central Academy (Azkayin Getronakan Varzharan) was founded in Mezre. By 1911, there was also an Armenian girls' school and a seminary, as well as two colleges run by French and German missionaries, among other educational institutions. There were four Armenian churches built in Mezre in the 19th (two Armenian Apostolic, one Catholic, and one Protestant). Mezre, like Harput, also had a minority population of Syriac Christians. The building of the American consulate in Harput, established in 1901, was in fact located in Mezre.

Harput was an important station for the American missionaries for many years. The missionaries built Euphrates College, a theological seminary, and boys' and girls' schools. It operated until 1915 when its buildings were confiscated and used by the Ottoman Army as barracks. In November 1895, government-backed Turks and Kurds massacred, looted and burned the Armenian villages on the plain. In the same month, Harput was attacked and the American schools were burned down. During the Armenian genocide, many residents were killed.

=== Turkish Republican era ===
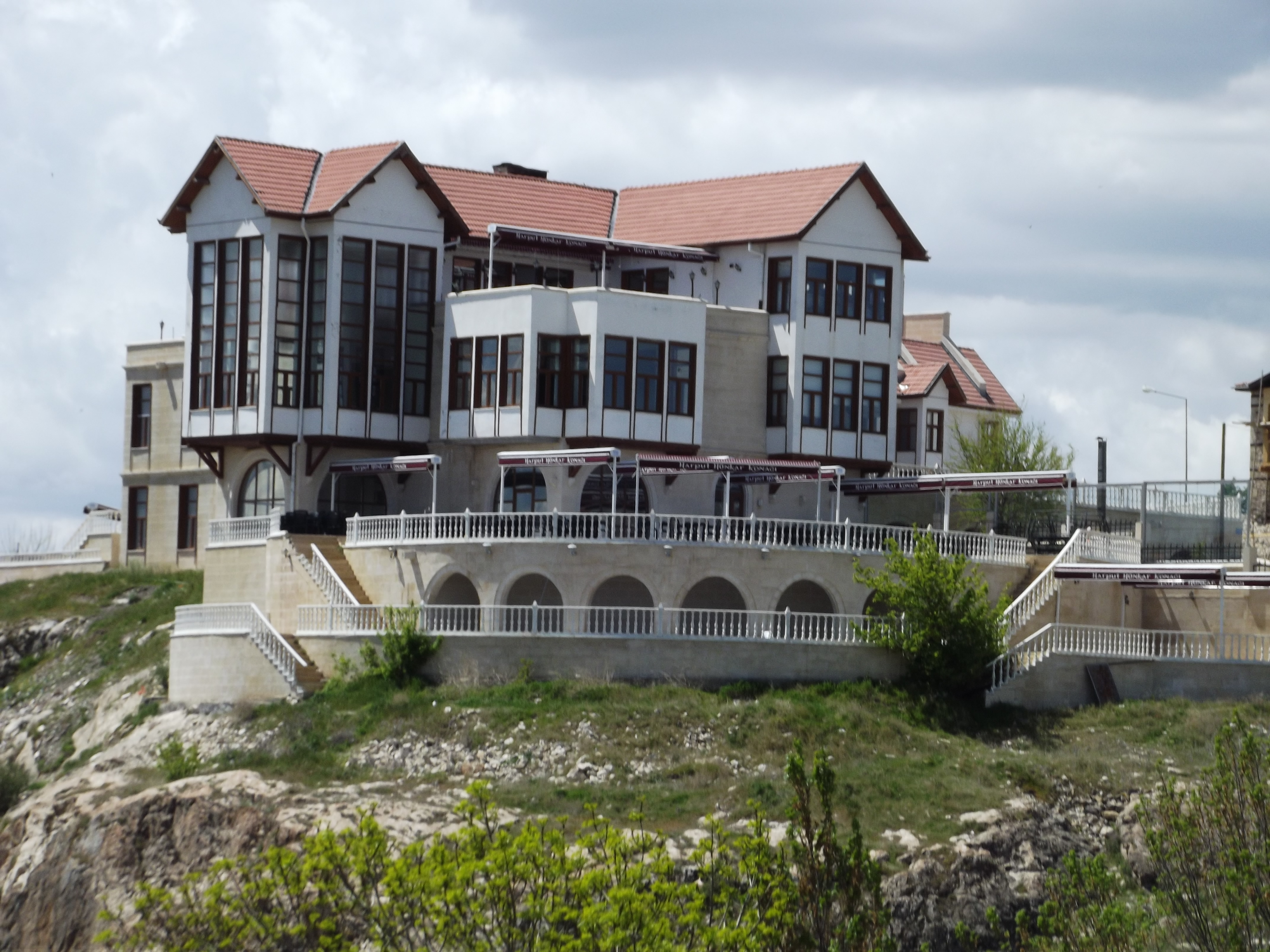
Harput is a popular tourism destination in Elazığ

The town was captured by Kurdish rebels during the Sheikh Said rebellion against the government of Atatürk in 1925. It was used as a base of operations by the Turkish Army during the Dersim rebellion.

Elazığ was the seat of the Fourth Inspectorate-General from 1936 until 1952. The Inspectorate General included the provinces of Elazığ, Erzincan, Bingöl, and Tunceli and was governed by a Governor Commander under military authority. He had wide-ranging power over the civilians and could order the application of capital punishment without permission from the Turkish parliament. The office of the Governor Commander was eventually left vacant in 1948 but the legal framework for the Inspectorate-Generals was only abolished in 1952.

Elazığ rapidly developed into a modern city in the Republican era, while Harput was largely an abandoned ruin in the 1930s and 1940s. Efforts began in the 1950s to renovate the old town of Harput: some historic monuments were restored, a new municipality building was built and a museum was opened. Over time, Harput was turned into a suburb of Elazığ, and facilities were created for tourism and recreation. The ruined Armenian neighborhoods of Harput were leveled in the 1960s and the 1970s.

== Ecclesiastical history ==
Harberd had many Armenian churches and monasteries. Also, in Harberd was seat of a Syrian Orthodox bishop as early as the eleventh century, whose diocese was initially called Ḥiṣn Ziyād and later Harput. Unlike many Christian dioceses in Turkey, Armenian and Assyrian churches are still functioning despite the massacres that took place in the city during the Armenian genocides and Assyrian, in which the bishop and most of his flock were killed. The diocese has two priests, with the main church being based in the ancient Merymana Kilisesi next to the wall of the old fortress.

== Demographics ==
In the early 20th century, the city was mainly inhabited by Turks and Armenians. The Armenian population grew rapidly in the late 19th century and made up most or half of the population. According to the Armenian Patriarchate of Constantinople, before the First World War, 39,788 Armenians lived in the kaza of Harput-Mezre, including 20,590 peasants in the surrounding 50 villages. They had 67 churches, 9 monasteries, and 92 schools. Most of the Armenians of the Kaza lived in the surrounding villages. Men were executed and women and children were sold to Muslims during the Armenian genocide. The city also housed Assyrians and Kurds.

Mother tongue, Elazığ District, 1927 Turkish census
| Turkish | Arabic | Kurdish | Circassian | Armenian | Unknown or other language |
|---|---|---|---|---|---|
| 60,740 | 12 | 16,700 | 2 | 1,659 | 98 |

Religion, Elazığ District, 1927 Turkish census
| Muslim | Christian | Jewish | Unknown or other religion |
|---|---|---|---|
| 77,369 | 1,782 | 1 | 62 |

The city currently has a mixed population of Kurds and Turks.

== Economy ==
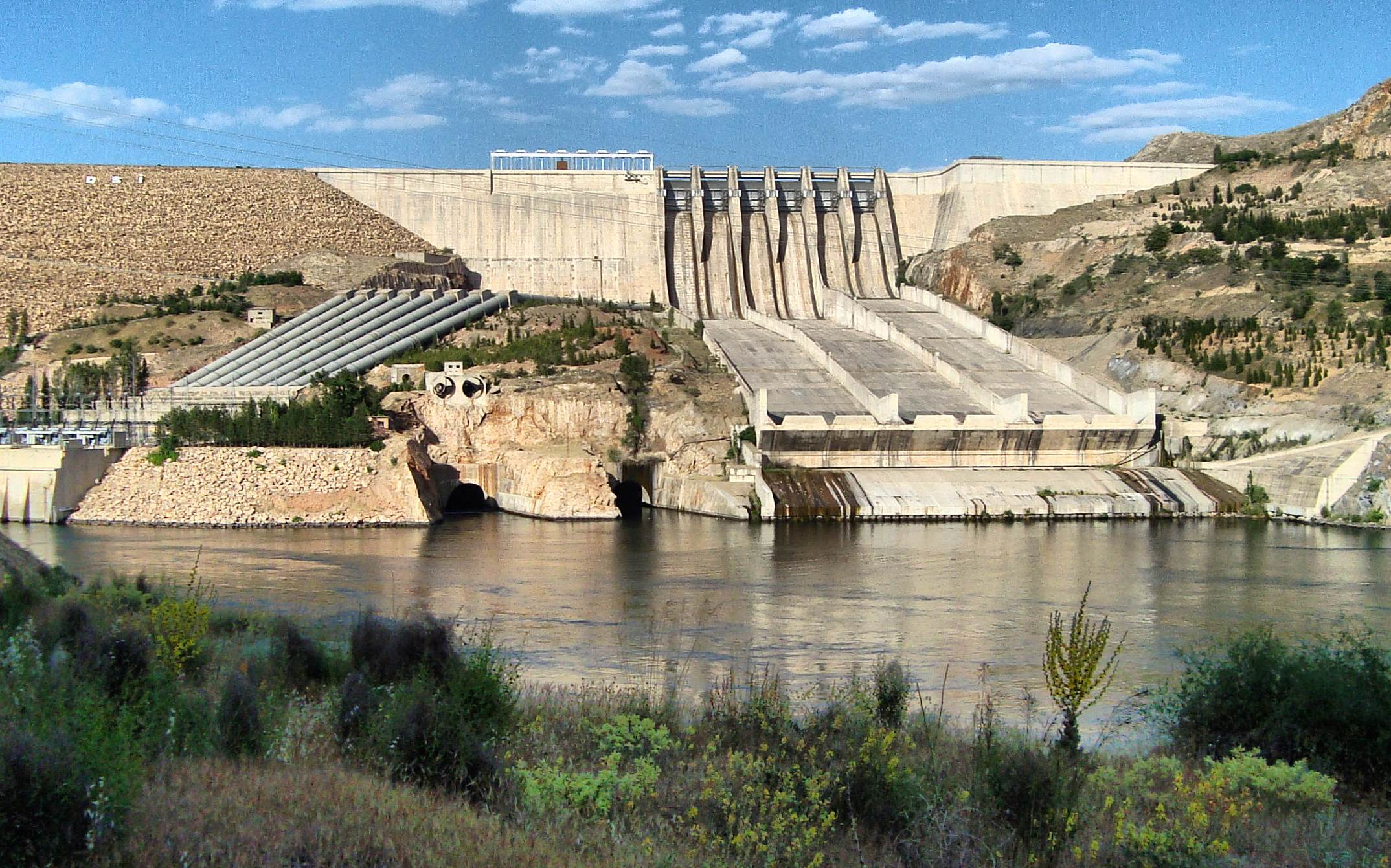
Keban Dam on Euphrates River

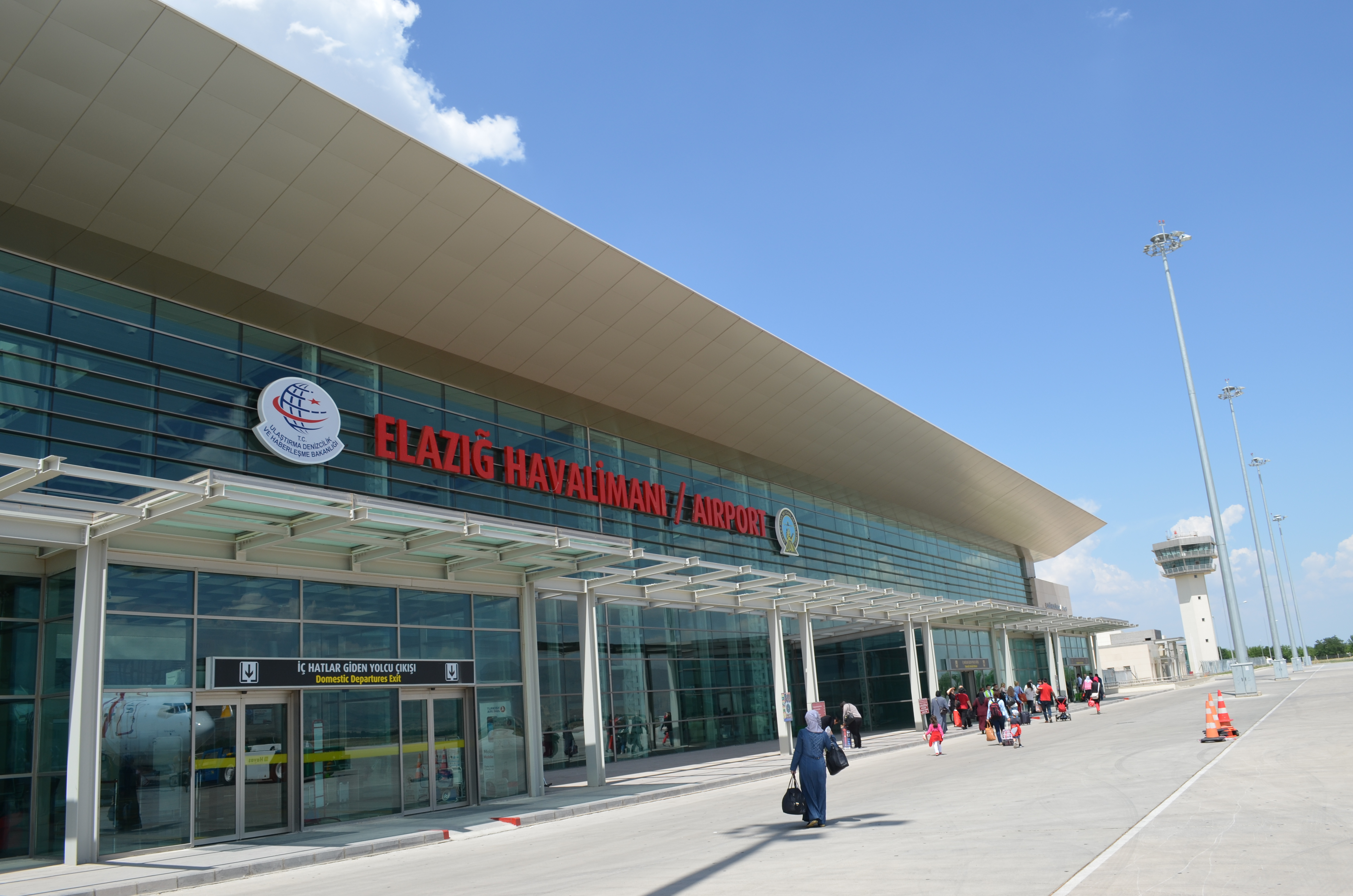
Elazığ Airport

In the late 19th and early 20th century, Elazığ exported raisins, apricots and almonds to Europe. Opium was also grown in the area. Honey was also produced, but mainly to be used by locals rather than exported. Gold was also found in the area in the early 20th century.

More than 30,000 people and at least 212 villages were affected by the construction of the Keban Dam in 1966–1974, which flooded several formerly populated areas. Many of those who were forced to move by the construction of the dam chose to settle in Elazığ and invested the indemnities paid to them by the state in houses in Elazığ or in small businesses. However, over 80% of families in zones affected by the Keban dam were landless peasants and thus ineligible to receive compensation, or peasants with little land who would receive very little money (Koyunlu 1982: 250)

The dam, industry, and mining accounts for the high level of urbanization (42.7% in 1970) surpassing the average levels for Eastern Anatolia. The main agricultural activity of the area centers around vineyards and Elazığ also serves as a market hub for other agricultural products. The state-run vineyards of Elazığ are notable for their production of Buzbağ, a full-flavored red wine.

Today, Elazığ is the capital of the Elazığ Province. It is a busy city with a university and an industrial base, although historic monuments are scarce. The exception is the ancient citadel and town of Harput, a dependency of the greater municipality of Elazığ today situated three miles (4.8 km) to the north of the city centre. Elazığ is the most developed city (and province) in the region, according to a report carried out by the Ministry of Development, making it the most developed region of Eastern Anatolia region.

== Geography ==
Elazığ is situated at the northwestern corner of a 30-mile-long valley, known locally as Uluova (literally the Great Valley). The area's Armenians called this valley "Vosgetashd" (the Golden Plain). Its altitude is 3,300 feet (1,000 m), latitude and longitude of 38 degrees and 41 minutes North, and 39 degrees and 14 minutes East. Elazığ Province is surrounded by the Euphrates in the north, and since the completion of Keban Dam the rivers came to cover almost ten percent of the surface area (826 square kilometres (319 sq mi)) of the province (8,455 square kilometres (3,264 sq mi)). Elazığ's adjacent province borders are with Tunceli (North), Erzincan (North-West), Bingöl (East), Diyarbakır (South), and Malatya (West).

=== Subdivisions ===
The city of Elazığ is divided into 41 quarters: Hilalkent, Çaydaçıra, Ataşehir, Cumhuriyet, Çatalçeşme, Doğukent, Fevziçakmak, Gümüşkavak, Karşıyaka, Kırklar, Kızılay, Kültür, Nailbey, Rızaiye, Salibaba, Sanayi, Sürsürü, Ulukent, Yeni, Zafran, Alayaprak, Esentepe, Göllübağ, Harput Merkez, Sugözü, Izzetpaşa, Akpınar, Çarşı, Icadiye, Aksaray, Mustafapaşa, Olgunlar, Rüstempaşa, Sarayatik, Üniversite, Yıldızbağları, Abdullahpaşa, Hicret, Şahinkaya, Yemişlik and Güneykent.

=== Climate ===
Elazığ has a Mediterranean (Köppen climate classification: Csa) or continental (Trewartha climate classification: Dca) climate with cold, snowy winters and hot, dry summers.

Highest recorded temperature:42.8 °C (109.0 °F) on 31 July 2025
Lowest recorded temperature:−22.6 °C (−8.7 °F) on 30 December 1951 and 20 January 1972

Climate data for Elazığ (1991–2020, extremes 1939–2025)
| Month | Jan | Feb | Mar | Apr | May | Jun | Jul | Aug | Sep | Oct | Nov | Dec | Year |
|---|---|---|---|---|---|---|---|---|---|---|---|---|---|
| Record high °C (°F) | 13.0 (55.4) | 18.6 (65.5) | 26.4 (79.5) | 32.2 (90.0) | 36.6 (97.9) | 38.6 (101.5) | 42.8 (109.0) | 42.2 (108.0) | 40.2 (104.4) | 32.4 (90.3) | 24.3 (75.7) | 19.6 (67.3) | 42.8 (109.0) |
| Mean daily maximum °C (°F) | 4.0 (39.2) | 6.3 (43.3) | 12.4 (54.3) | 18.4 (65.1) | 24.2 (75.6) | 30.7 (87.3) | 35.2 (95.4) | 35.2 (95.4) | 30.1 (86.2) | 22.6 (72.7) | 13.1 (55.6) | 5.9 (42.6) | 19.8 (67.6) |
| Daily mean °C (°F) | 0.1 (32.2) | 1.5 (34.7) | 6.7 (44.1) | 12.1 (53.8) | 17.1 (62.8) | 23.0 (73.4) | 27.4 (81.3) | 27.3 (81.1) | 21.9 (71.4) | 15.3 (59.5) | 7.3 (45.1) | 2.2 (36.0) | 13.5 (56.3) |
| Mean daily minimum °C (°F) | −3.1 (26.4) | −2.6 (27.3) | 1.6 (34.9) | 6.2 (43.2) | 10.3 (50.5) | 14.7 (58.5) | 19.0 (66.2) | 18.9 (66.0) | 13.9 (57.0) | 8.8 (47.8) | 2.6 (36.7) | −0.9 (30.4) | 7.4 (45.3) |
| Record low °C (°F) | −22.6 (−8.7) | −21.4 (−6.5) | −17.0 (1.4) | −7.0 (19.4) | 0.0 (32.0) | 4.0 (39.2) | 6.7 (44.1) | 10.2 (50.4) | 1.0 (33.8) | −2.2 (28.0) | −15.2 (4.6) | −22.6 (−8.7) | −22.6 (−8.7) |
| Average precipitation mm (inches) | 37.8 (1.49) | 41.8 (1.65) | 50.9 (2.00) | 60.7 (2.39) | 51.4 (2.02) | 13.6 (0.54) | 3.3 (0.13) | 1.3 (0.05) | 9.9 (0.39) | 42.1 (1.66) | 45.6 (1.80) | 45.6 (1.80) | 404.0 (15.91) |
| Average precipitation days | 11.1 | 10.73 | 11.23 | 11.8 | 11.2 | 4.47 | 1.4 | 0.9 | 2.7 | 7.07 | 7.93 | 11.17 | 91.7 |
| Average snowy days | 6.58 | 4.46 | 1.83 | 0.17 | 0 | 0 | 0 | 0 | 0 | 0.04 | 0.46 | 2.58 | 16.12 |
| Average relative humidity (%) | 73.1 | 69.9 | 61 | 57 | 53.5 | 39.4 | 31.5 | 30.9 | 36.5 | 53.5 | 67.1 | 75.6 | 54.1 |
| Mean monthly sunshine hours | 89.9 | 101.7 | 151.9 | 180.0 | 251.1 | 303.0 | 334.8 | 303.8 | 261.0 | 198.4 | 132.0 | 65.1 | 2,372.7 |
| Mean daily sunshine hours | 2.9 | 3.6 | 4.9 | 6.0 | 8.1 | 10.1 | 10.8 | 9.8 | 8.7 | 6.4 | 4.4 | 2.1 | 6.5 |
Source 1: Turkish State Meteorological Service
Source 2: NOAA NCEI(humidity 1991-2020), Meteomanz (extremes since 2021)

== Cuisine ==
Elazığ cuisine is the second richest among all cities in Turkey with 154 different types of food and drinks according to a study conducted by the Ankara Chamber of Commerce. Particularly those who originated in the historic city of Harput have important fame in the region and the country. Apart from famous meat platters most of which include meatballs, naturally dried fruits and vegetables, and using them in main dishes are unique to Elazığ cuisine. Several examples could include:

- Kofik dolma - stuffed dried peppers or aubergines
- Kelecoş - fried meat and onion served over a bed of flatbread pieces softened in yogurt
- İşkene - a breakfast soup containing broth and vegetables
- Harput köfte - meatballs made with a mixture of minced meat, cracked wheat, herbs and spices boiled in tomato sauce
- Taş Ekmeği - unleavened flatbread baked over hot stone or hotplate served with butter and jam
- Işkın yemeği - a wild rhubarb dish
- Sırın - pan-broiled handmade filo pastry roundels with a layer of yogurt and tomato sauce on top
- Kömme - baked handmade filo pastry roundels built with a layer of meat filling and a layer of walnut paste
- Gaygana - a mixture of eggs, yogurt, bicarbonate, and flour drops fried in oil
- Orcik - walnut halves sewn in a thread, dipped into deep grape syrup
- Orcik şekeri - caramelised sugar coated walnut pieces

Elazığ is also known for its vineyards and two types of grape varieties Öküzgözü and Boğazkere.

== Transport ==
Elazığ is served by Elazığ Airport which lies about 12 km (7 mi) from the city center. The airport is the 19th busiest airport in Turkey in terms of passenger traffic. There are daily domestic flights from/to Ankara, Istanbul, and İzmir. During summer months there are some international flights from/to cities such as Düsseldorf and Frankfurt as well as from/to Antalya and Adana.

There are local companies that provide coach services to almost all cities in Turkey. Ferryboat services are also present over the reservoir lakes to supplement highway connections to towns such as Ağın, and Pertek and Çemişgezek of Tunceli.

The Blue Train (passenger express) provides the connection from Elazığ to Ankara.

== Education ==
Elazığ is home to Fırat University, established in 1975 and since has become one of the leading academic institutions in eastern Turkey.

== Attractions ==
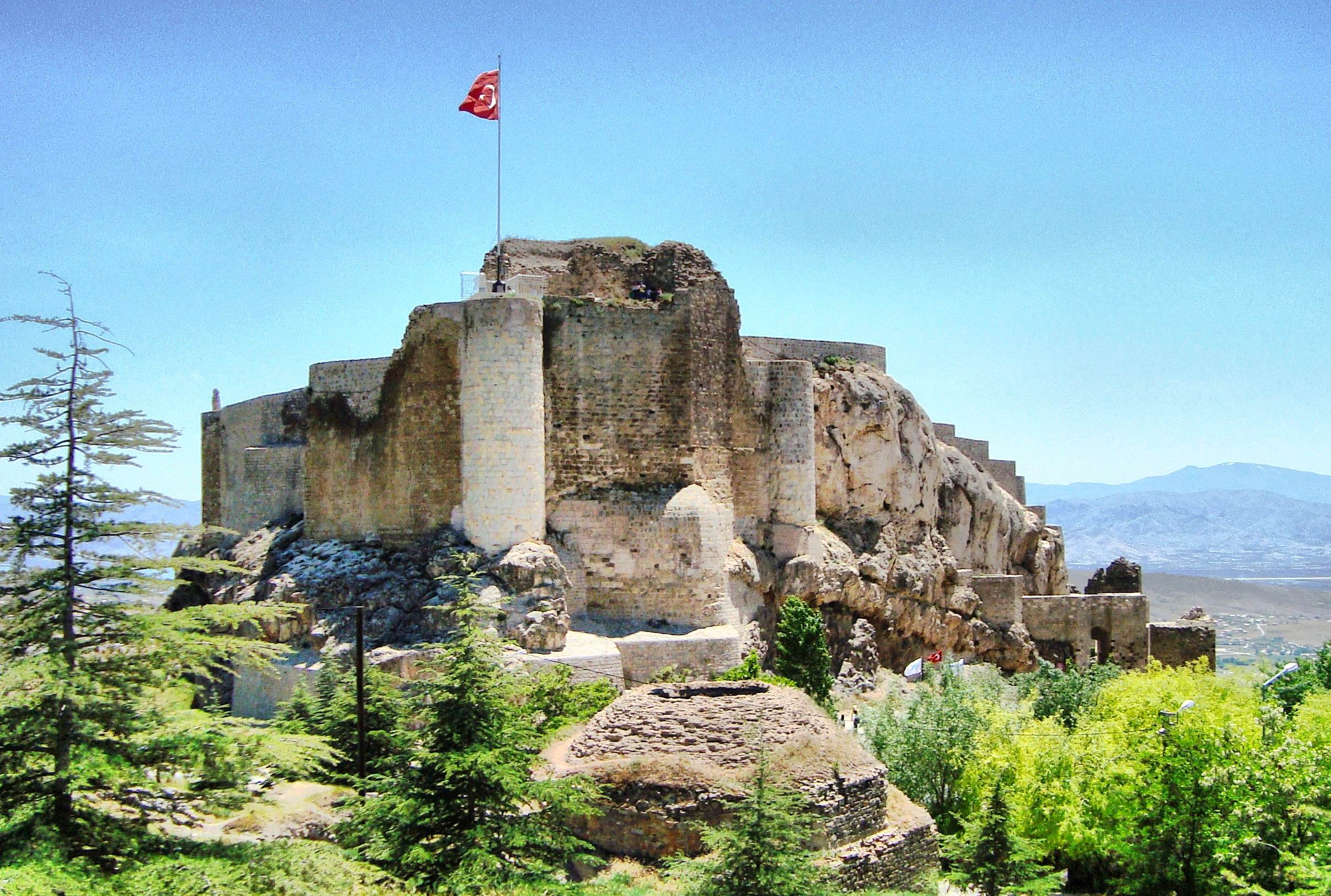
Harput Castle

- Fırat University
- Harput Castle
- Elazığ Culture Park
- Elazığ Botanical Park
- Elazığ Gazi Caddesi
- Buzluk Mağarası (Ice Cave)
- Museum of Archaeology and Ethnography
- Hazar Gölü (Lake Hazar)

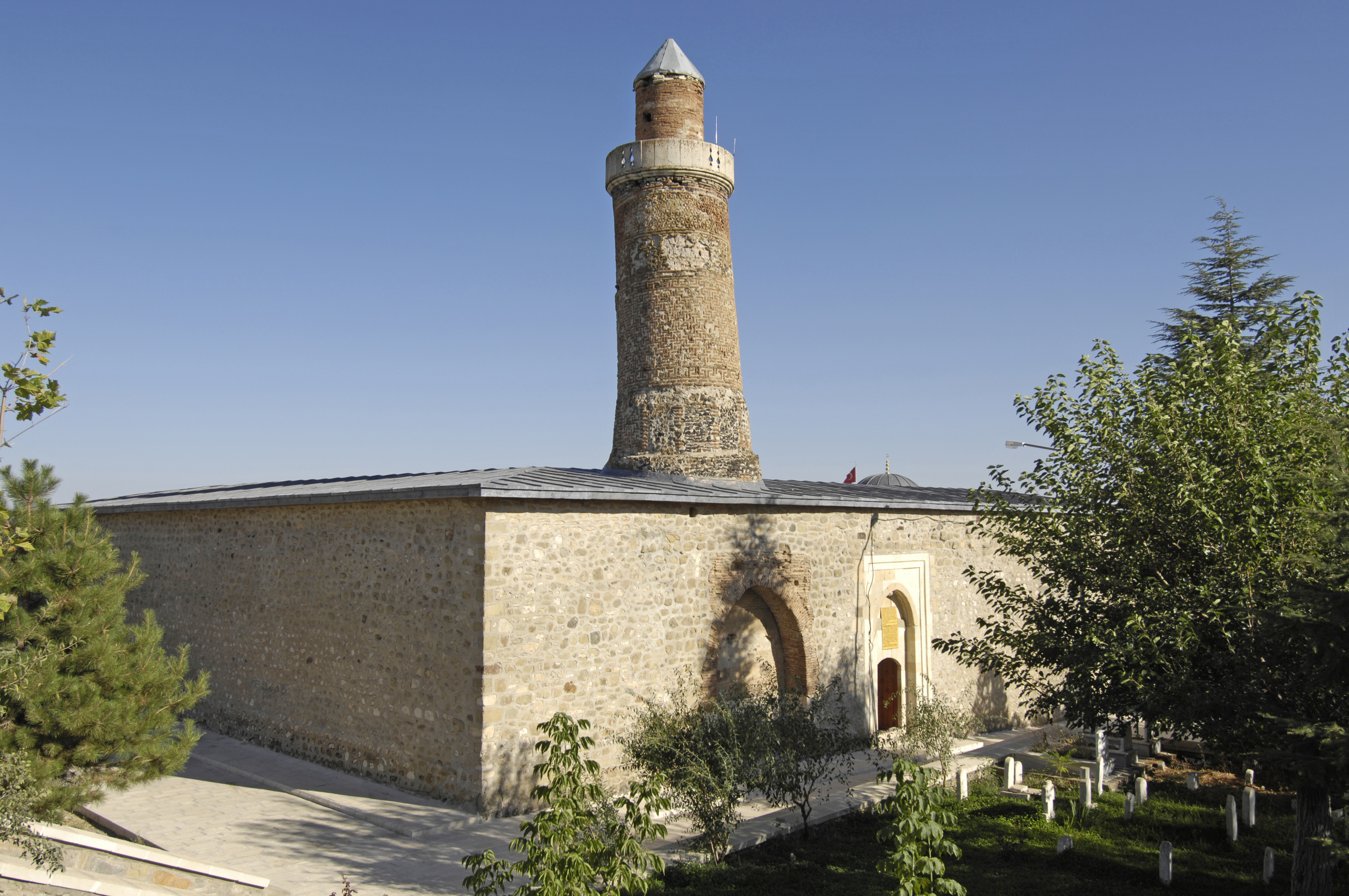
Harput Ulu Camii

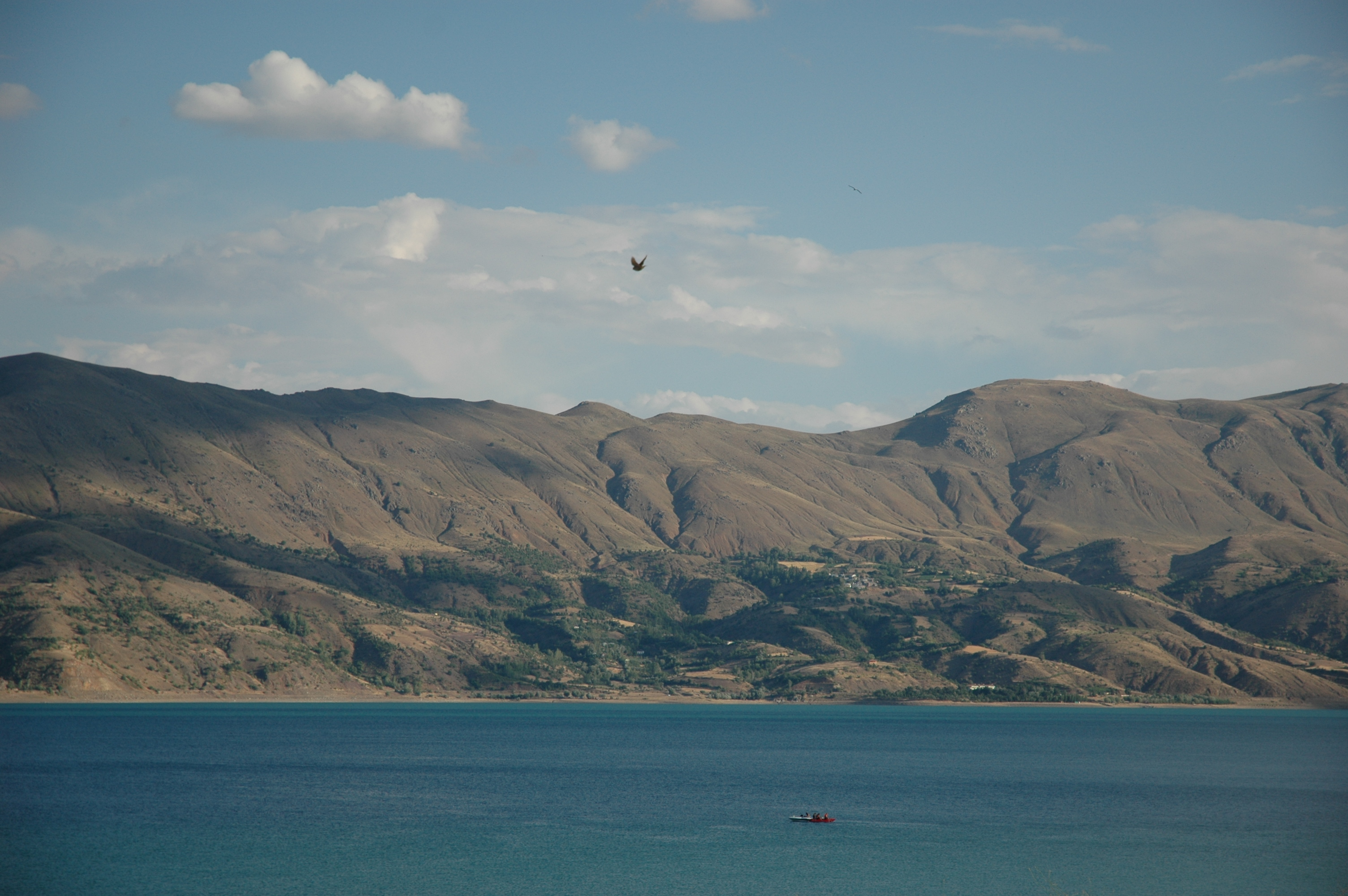
Mount Hazar Baba rises above Lake Hazar

- Hazarbaba Ski Centre
- Historic mosques (Cami in Turkish), churches and shrines (Türbe in Turkish). Do note they are in Harput, on a hill out of town, but near enough to pay them a visit.
  - Ulu Camii: Built by Artuqid Sultan Fahrettin Karaaslan in 1156. It is one of the oldest and most important structures in Anatolia
  - Sarahatun Camii (also known as Sarayhatun Cami): Built by Sara Hatun, mother of Aq Qoyunlu (White Sheep Turkomans) Sultan Bahadır Han (also known as Uzun Hassan), in 1465 as a small mosque. It was renovated in 1585 and 1843.
  - Kurşunlu Camii: Built between 1738 and 1739 in Harput during the Ottoman era.
  - Alacalı Camii
  - Ağa Camii: built in 1559.
  - Arap Baba Mescidi ve Türbesi: Built during the reign of Seljuk Sultan Gıyaseddin Keyhüsrev III (son of Kılıçarslan IV) in 1279. The shrine contains a mummified body which is known as Arap Baba among commons.
  - Fetih Ahmet Baba Türbesi (Shrine of Fetih Ahmed)
  - Mansur Baba Türbesi
  - Mary Church
  - Sefik Gul Community Centre of Culture

== Twin towns – sister cities ==
Elazığ is twinned with:

- Akmola Region, Kazakhstan
- Mamusha, Kosovo

== Gallery ==
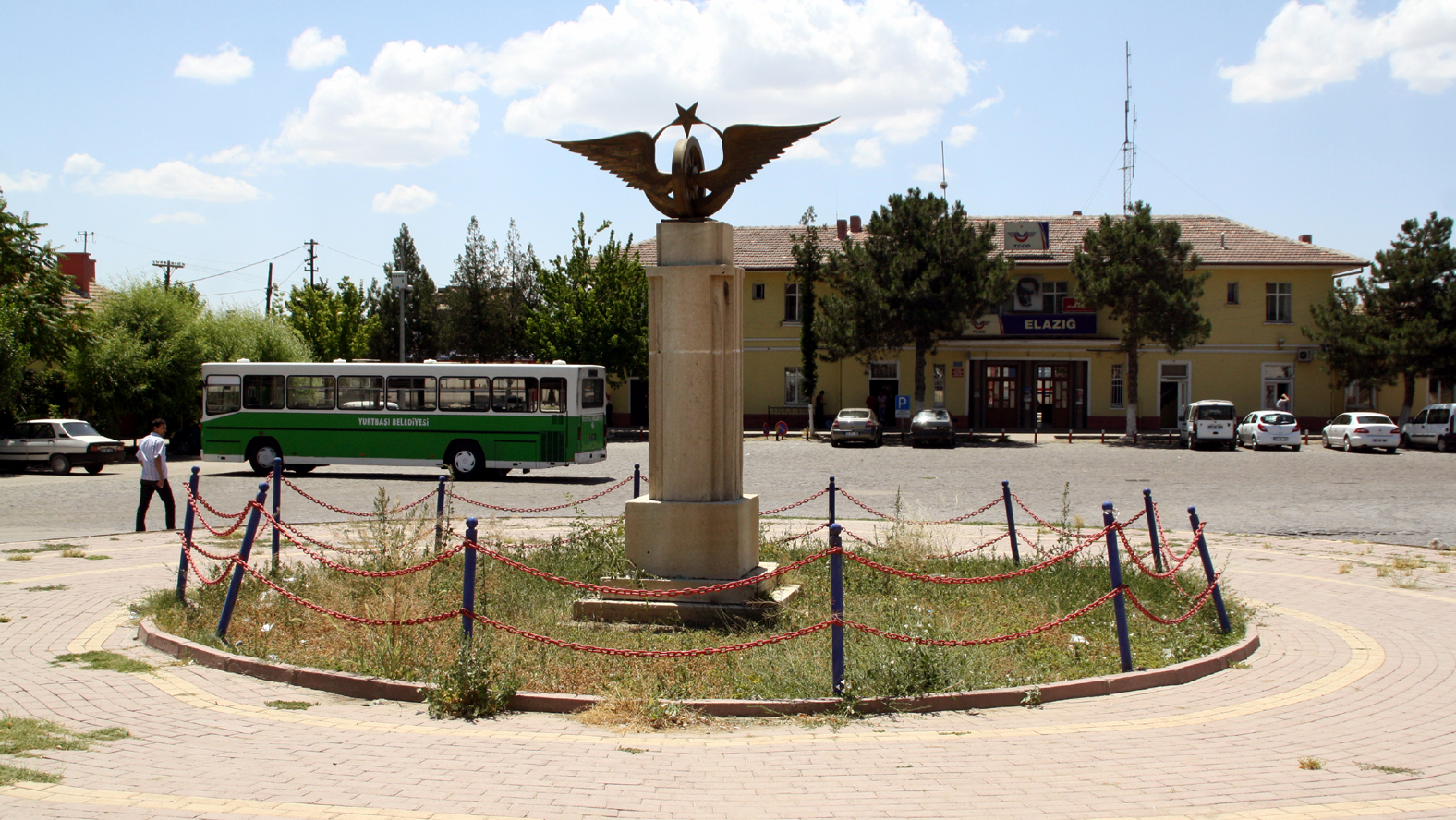
Elazığ Train Station

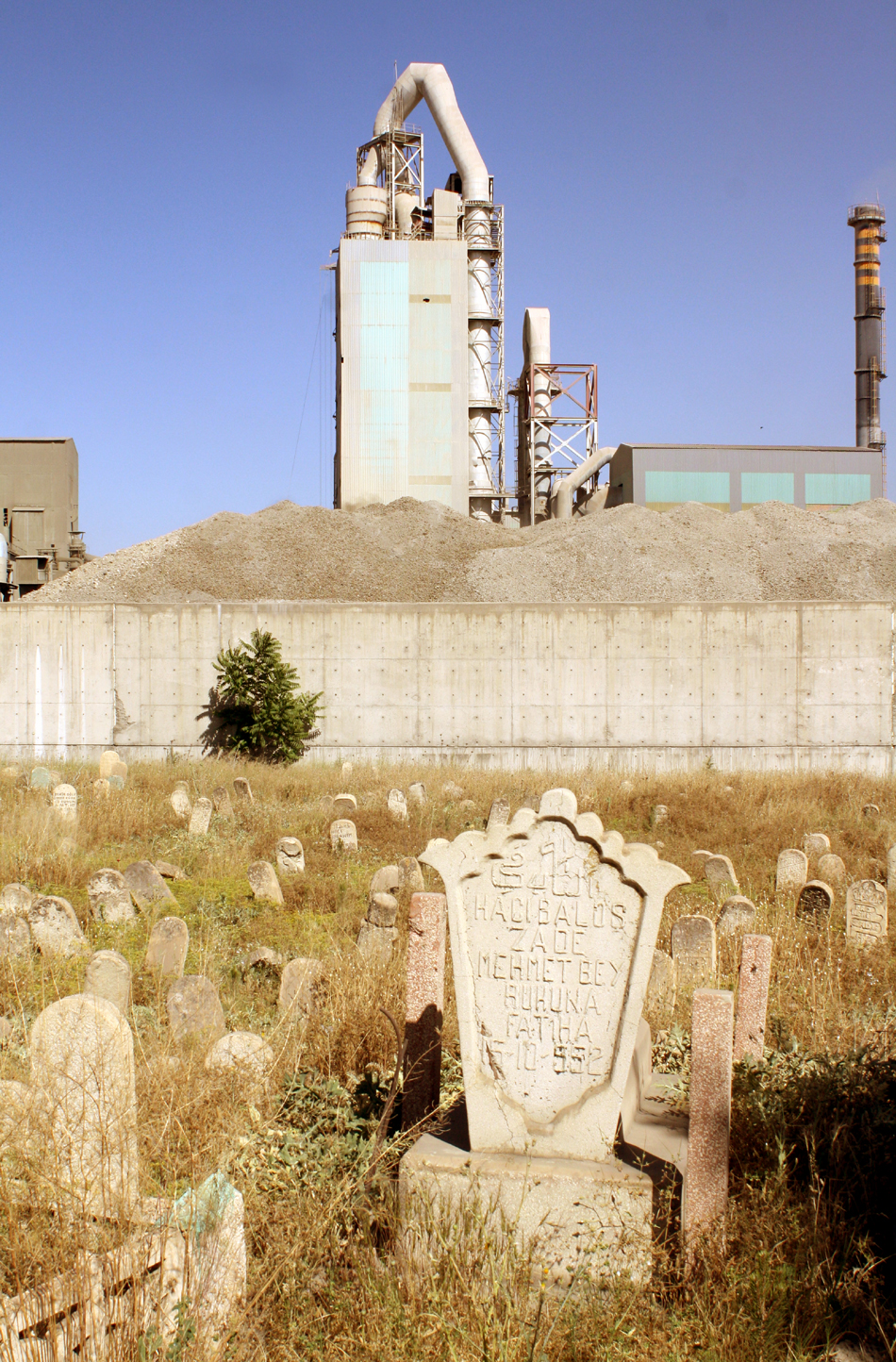
Old cemetery (with a cement plant behind it)

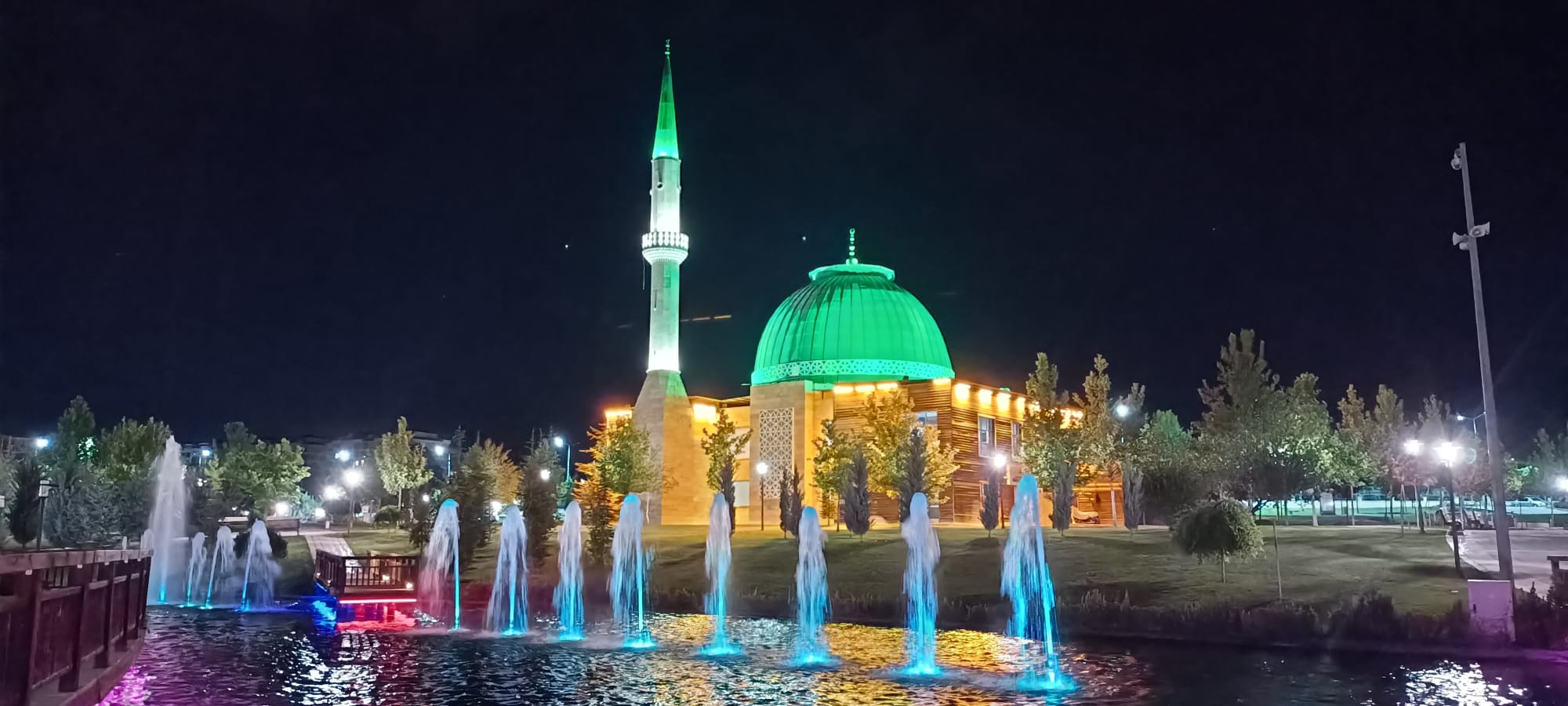
Culture Park

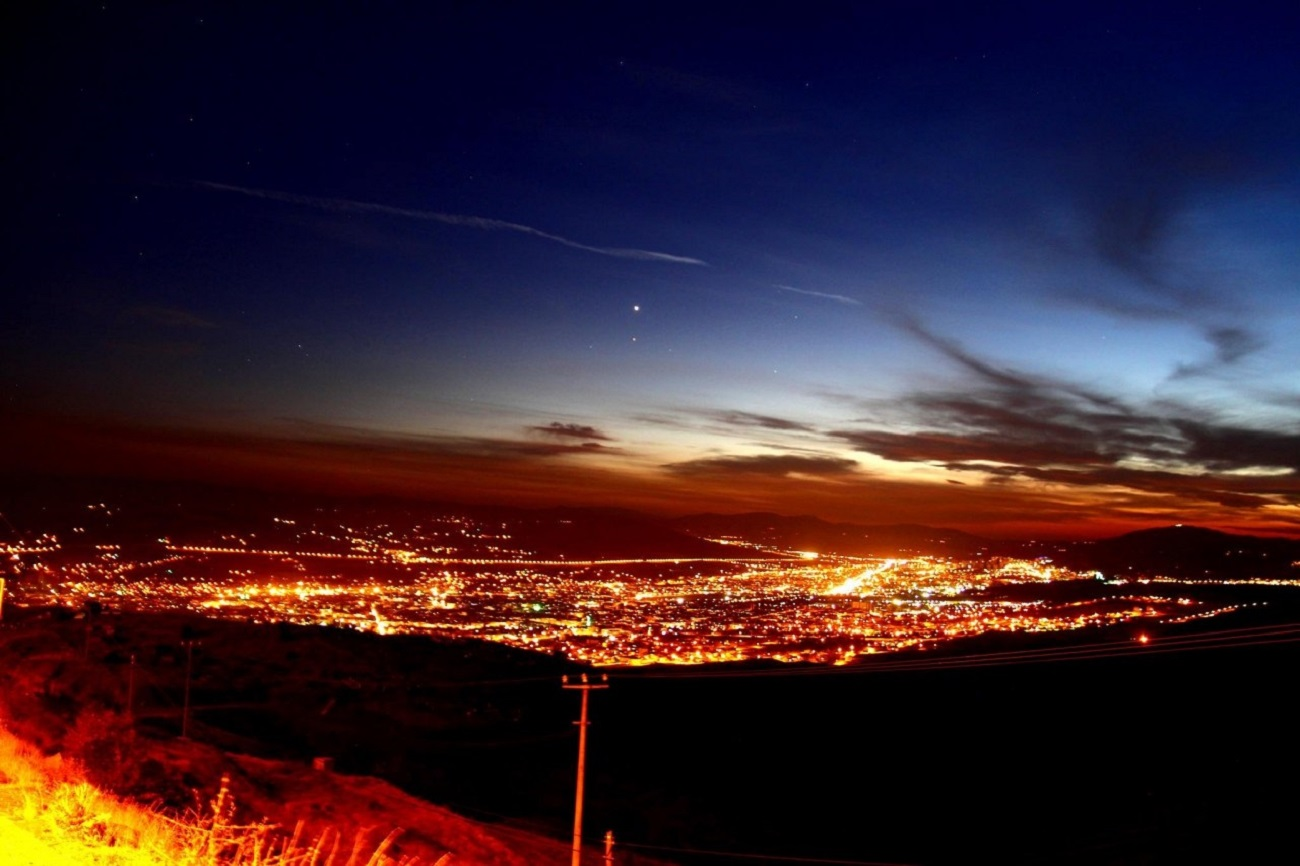
City view at night

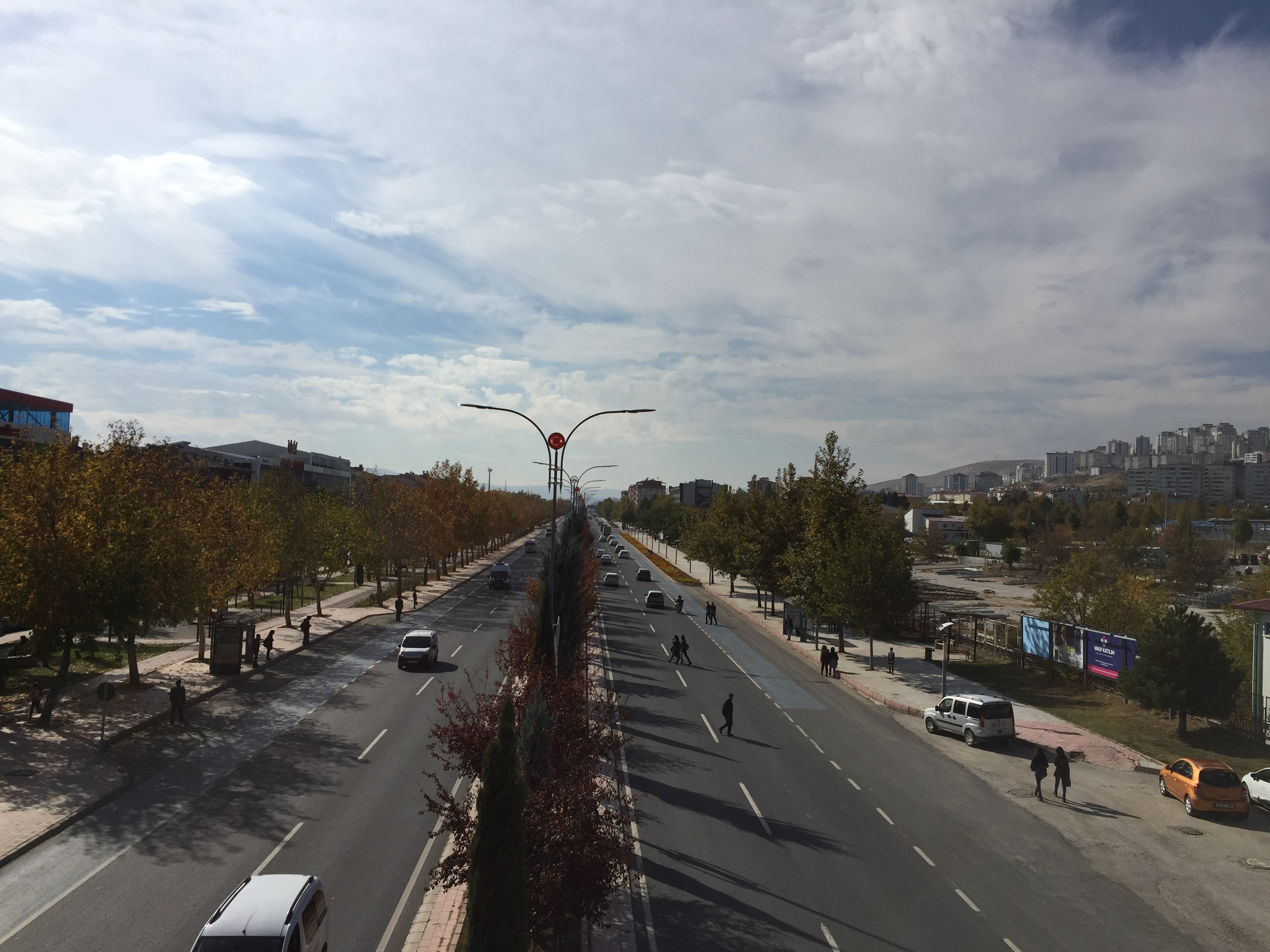
A street in Elazığ

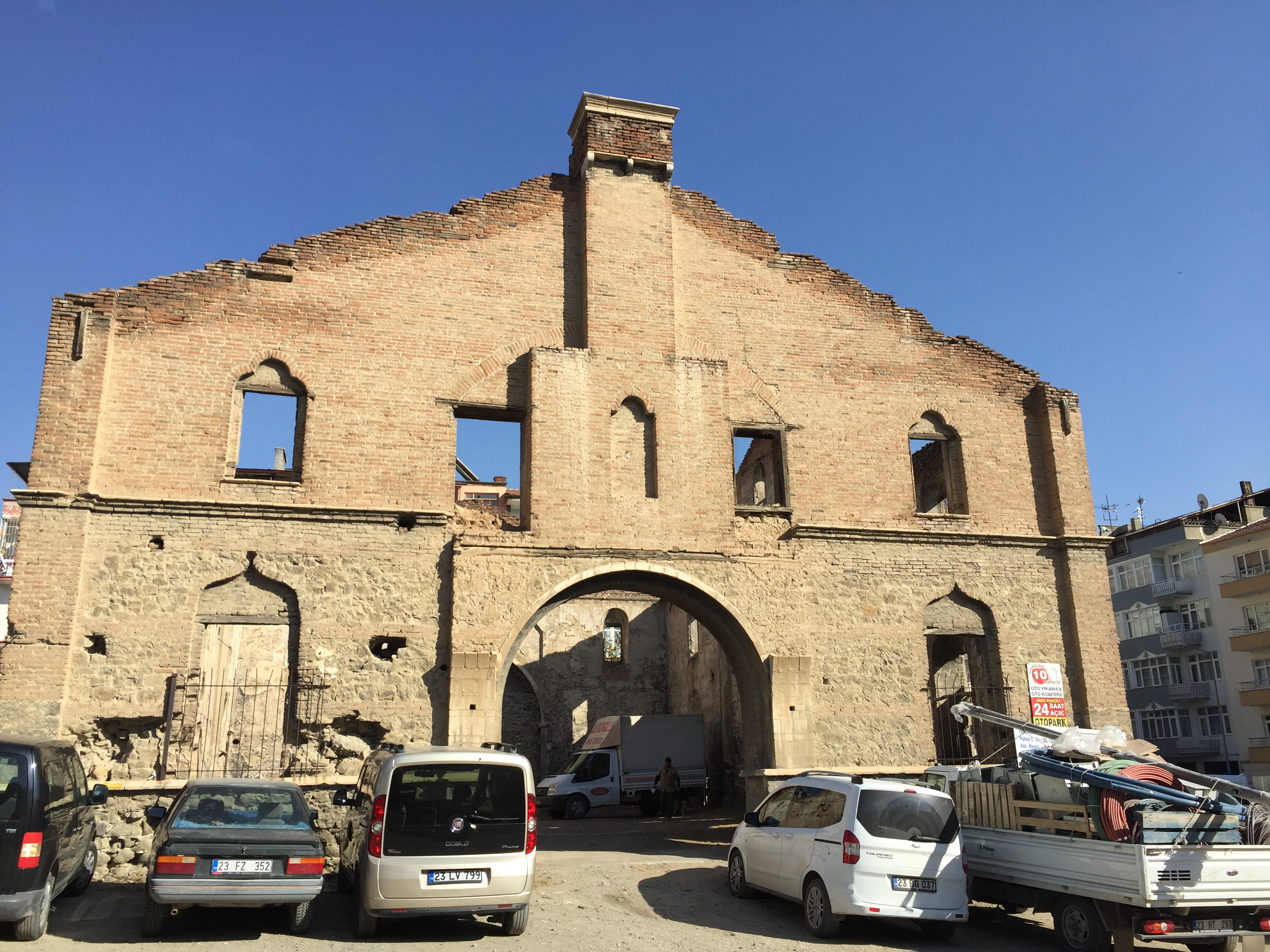
Armenian Evangelical Church, Elâzığ

== Notable people ==
- Mehmet Ağar, politician
- Aydın Güven Gürkan, politician
- Sheikh Said-Naqshbandi, sheikh
- Selahattin Demirtaş, lawyer and politician.
- Fatih Kısaparmak, Turkish folk music artist
- Kenan Çoban, actor
- Necati Şaşmaz, actor
- Raci Şaşmaz, film producer
- Ulvi Güveneroğlu, footballer
- Yakup Kilic, Boxer
- Vahan Totovents, Armenian writer, poet and public activist
- J. Michael Hagopian, Armenian-born American Emmy-nominated filmmaker

== Mayors of Elazığ ==
- 1984-1989 Mustafa Temizer ANAP
- 1989-1994 Hikmet Behçet Susmaz MÇP, MHP
- 1994-2004 Hamza Yanılmaz Refah Party, Fazilet Party, Saadet Party
- 2004-2014 Mehmet Süleyman Selmanoğlu DYP, DP, AK Party
- 2014-2019 Mücahit Yanılmaz AK Party
- 2019-present Şahin Şerifoğulları AK Party

== Sources ==
- David Ayalon, Moshe Sharon (1986). Studies in Islamic History and Civilization; Article: Ma'mûrat al-Aziz. Brill Publishers. p. 342. ISBN 978-0-510-03200-5.
- Alpaslan Koyunlu (1982). Keban Project 1974-1975 Excavations; Article: The Village Settlement of Mumzuroğlu – Observations on Housing. M.E.T.U.
- Fiey, Jean Maurice (1993). Pour un Oriens Christianus Novus: Répertoire des diocèses syriaques orientaux et occidentaux. Beirut: Orient-Institut. ISBN 9783515057189.
