= Harpoot =

Ancient Fortress City in Elazığ, Turkey

Coordinates: 38°42′18″N 39°15′05″E

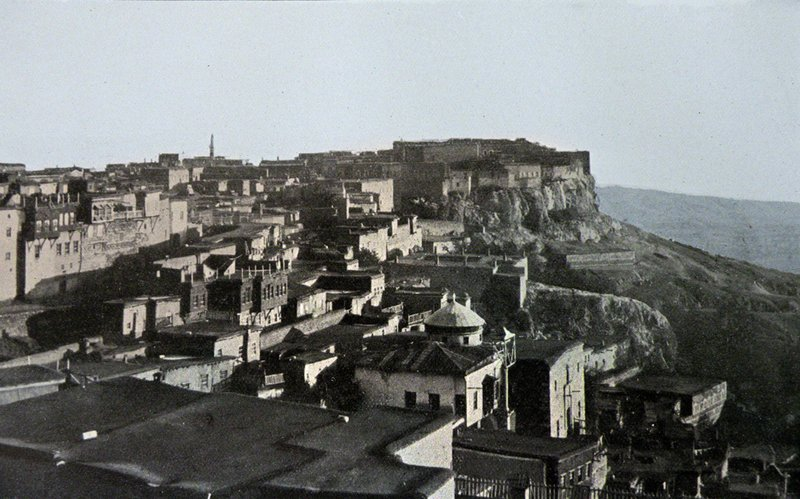
View of Harput in 1896

Harpoot (Turkish: Harput) or Kharpert (Armenian: Խարբերդ, romanized: Kharberd) (Note: Also called Karput, Kharput. Western Armenian pronunciation: [χɑɾˈpʰɛɾtʰ]; Eastern Armenian pronunciation: [χɑɾˈbɛɾtʰ].) is an ancient town located in the Elazığ Province of Turkey. It now forms a small district of the city of Elazığ. In the late Ottoman period, it fell under the Mamuret-ul-Aziz Vilayet (also known as the Harput Vilayet). Artifacts from around 2000 BC have been found in the area. The town is famous for its Harput Castle, and incorporates a museum, old mosques, a church, and the Buzluk (Ice) Cave. Harput is about 1,100 kilometres (700 mi) from Istanbul.

Harput was a largely Armenian populated region in medieval times and had a significant Armenian population until the Armenian genocide. By the 20th century, Harput had been absorbed into Mezre (renamed Elazığ in 1937), a town on the plain below Harput that significantly grew in size in the 19th century.

== Name ==
Kharberd was first interpreted as consisting of the Armenian words kʻar ("rock") and berd ("castle, fortress"), as if meaning "a fortress surrounded by rock faces." Others have connected the name with a Hurrian word, har/khar, meaning "path" or "road." Nicholas Adontz proposed a connection with Kharta, a city mentioned in Assyrian cuneiform inscriptions, putatively having developed into Khartberd and later Kharberd. Another proposed etymology connects it with the name of a Hittite and Hurrian goddess. Kharbed is sometimes identified with Hoṛeberd, a fortress in the Antzitene canton of the province of Sophene of the Kingdom of Armenia; according to this view, Kharberd is a corrupted form of the name Hoṛeberd (with the proposed development Hoṛeberd-Khoreberd-Kharberd).

Arabic sources referred to Kharberd as Khartbirt or as Hisn Ziyad, from the Syriac Hesna d-Ziyad, meaning "the fortress of Ziyad." The medieval geographer Al-Dimashqi wrote that Khartbirt was the name of the city, while Hisn Ziyad referred to the ancient citadel.

== Geography ==
Harput is located on a hilltop above a rich, fertile plain historically dotted with villages, about 14 km away from the left bank of the Murat River․ To its southeast is Lake Hazar (previously known as Gölcük in Turkish and Tsovkʻ in Armenian), the source of the Tigris River.

== History ==
Historian Hakob Manandian believed Harput to be the site of Ura, the main fortress of the Bronze Age Hayasa-Azzi confederation. Harput was a fortress town of the Iron Age Kingdom of Urartu. In the classical period, Harput was a part of the Kingdom of Sophene and later the Armenian province of Sophene. Some scholars consider it to be the site of Carcathiocerta, the initial capital of the Kingdom of Sophene.

Harput was developed as a military base during the second Byzantine occupation of the region, after 938. An imposing fortress was built on a wide rock outcropping overlooking the valley from the south. A town grew around the fortress, with a primarily Armenian and Syriac population that came from nearby villages as well as the city of Arsamosata further east. By the late 11th century, Harput had eclipsed Arsamosata to become the main settlement in the region. Around 1085, a Turkish warlord named Çubuk conquered Harput and was confirmed as its ruler by the Seljuk Sultan Malik-Shah I. The Great Mosque of Harput was built opposite the citadel by either Çubuk or his son (attested as the ruler here in 1107). William of Tyre wrote that Joscelin I, Count of Edessa (Jocelyn) of Courtenay, and King Baldwin II of Jerusalem were prisoners of Belek Ghazi in Kharput's castle and that they were rescued by their Armenian allies. William of Tyre calls the place Quart Piert or Pierre.

The first Artukid ruler of Harput was Balak, who was related to the Artukid rulers of Mardin and Hisn Kayfa but not directly part of either ruling family. Balak died young in 1124 and the Artukids of Hisn Kayfa took over. Later, Imad ad-Din Abu Bakr, an Artukid prince who had previously attempted to usurp the throne of Hisn Kayfa, gained control of Harput. Harput remained an independent Artukid principality until 1234, when it was conquered by the Seljuks. It was during the Artukid period that the former population of Arsamosata became fully absorbed by Harput. In the early 1200s, one of the Artukid princes may have entirely rebuilt the citadel. In the subsequent period of Seljuk rule, not much was built in Harput.

From the mid-14th century until 1433, Harput became part of the Beylik of Dulkadir. It was one of the main cities in the beylik, and the citadel was again rebuilt during this period. The Aq Qoyunlu ruled Harput from 1433 to 1478; the Aq Qoyunlu ruler Uzun Hasan's wife, a Greek Christian from Trebizond, lived here with her Greek entourage. Ottoman rule began in Harput in 1515. The Siege of Harput occurred the next year. Under the Ottomans, Harput remained a prosperous industrial center, with thriving silk-weaving and carpet-making industries and many medreses.

In 1834, however, the governors of the Sanjak of Harput moved their residence to the town of Mezre, on the plain to the northeast, and some of Harput's population moved with them. In 1838 a barracks was built in Mezre as a local base against Muhammad Ali of Egypt. In 1879, Mezre was built up into a large city named Mamuret el-Aziz, which became modern Elazığ.

Various estimates exist for the population and ethnic makeup of Harput in the 19th century: 3000 Armenian and Turkish households at the beginning of the 19th century, 25,000 inhabitants (of which 15,400 were Armenian) in 1830–1850 and around 20,000 in 1892. Another estimate places the town's population at the beginning of the 20th century at 12,200 (6,080 Armenians and 6,120 non-Armenians). Raymond Kévorkian gives the combined Armenian population of Harput and 56 other nearby localities (the Harput kaza) on the eve of World War I as 39,788 and the Armenian population of the entire Harput Vilayet as 124,289.

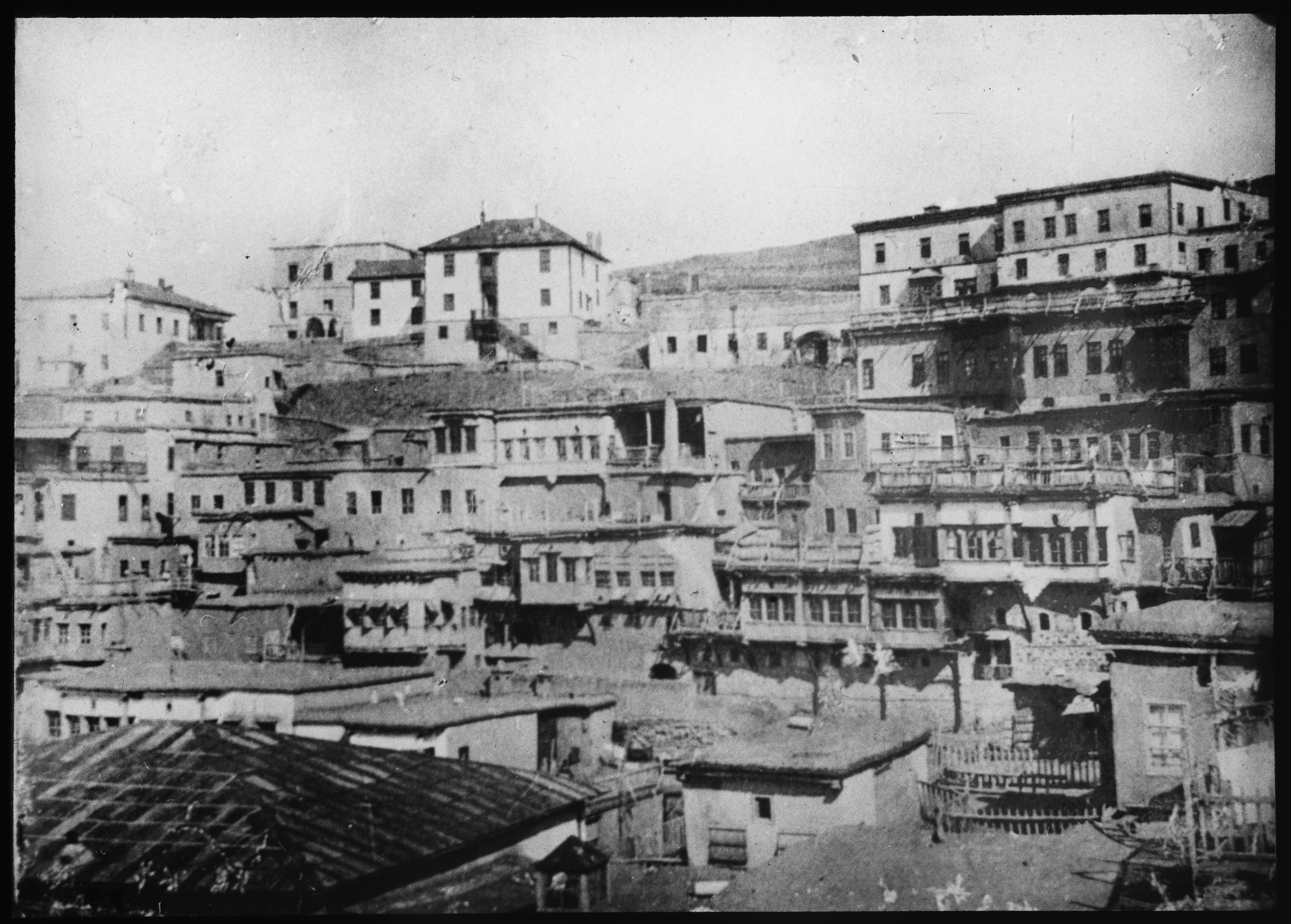
Harput in the early 20th century

In the second half of the 19th century, there were six Armenian churches in Harput. Five of them were Armenian Apostolic and one was Protestant. Protestant missionary activity in Harput and the surrounding area began in 1855. Harpoot Female Seminary was established in 1858. An American missionary school was established near the citadel, providing an education mainly for Armenians. The missionary-run Euphrates College was the only high school in the town. There was also a French missionary school. The town's Armenians had their own educational centers as well, consisting of five church schools and the Smpadian coeducational academy. Harput's community of Syriac Christians had their own quarter and numbered around 800 people, according to one estimate. The Syriacs spoke Armenian as their first language and had close ties with the Armenian community. There was at least one school in the Syriac quarter, and a separate Syriac girls' school was founded in 1909.

American missionary Rev. Dr. Herman N. Barnum gave the following description of Harput in 1892:

The city of Harput has a population of perhaps 20,000, and it is located a few miles east of the river Euphrates, near latitude thirty-nine, and east from Greenwich about thirty-nine degrees. It is on a mountain facing south, with a populous plain 1,200 feet [370 m] below it. The Taurus Mountains lie beyond the plain, twelve miles [19 km] away. The Anti-Taurus range lies some forty miles [65 km] to the north in full view from the ridge just back of the city. The surrounding population are mostly farmers, and they all live in villages. No city in Turkey is the center of so many Armenian villages, and the most of them are large. Nearly thirty can be counted from different parts of the city. This makes Harput a most favorable missionary center. Fifteen out-stations lie within ten miles [16 km] of the city. The Arabkir field, on the west, was joined to Harput in 1865, and the following year…the larger part of the Diyarbekir field on the south; so that now the limits of the Harput station embrace a district nearly one third as large as new England.

Emigration of Armenians and Syriacs from Harput had already begun in the 1850s, the main destinations being other cities of the Ottoman Empire, the United States and the Caucasus. Harput was affected by the Hamidian massacres in the 1890s. The Turkish attackers looted and damaged the Armenian neighborhoods of the town, killing 700 Armenians and forcibly Islamizing 200 Armenian families, according to one estimate.

Harput was located in a remote and isolated region of the Ottoman Empire, and consequently few outsiders visited it. Around 1910, the travel time from Constantinople (now Istanbul) to Harput was about three days by train and then 18 days on horseback.

=== Armenian genocide ===
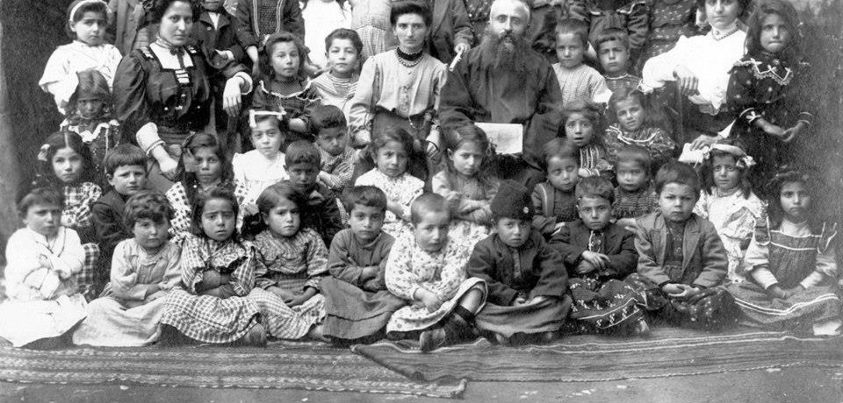
Armenian children at kindergarten in Harput, 1900

The extermination of Armenians in the Harput Vilayet is one of the best documented episodes of the Armenian genocide. Several notable eyewitness accounts about the genocide of Armenians in Harput exist. One of them is that of Henry H. Riggs, a congregational minister and ABCFM missionary who had been the head of Euphrates College. His report about the genocide was sent to the United States, and in 1997 it was published under the title Days of Tragedy in Armenia. The American consul in Harput Leslie A. Davis, who hid about 80 Armenians on the consulate grounds (located in Mezre), wrote detailed reports about the events in Harput during the genocide.

In April 1915, the Armenian population of the vilayet was disarmed, which was followed by the arrest of dozens of Armenian elites. The Armenian inhabitants of Harput and the surrounding area were deported and massacred starting in June 1915. As in other places, men were the first to be rounded up and taken away to be killed, followed by the deportation of women, children and the elderly. Since Harput was a major transit point for deportees from other parts of the Ottoman Empire, a large number of Armenians from other regions died in the area. This prompted the American consul Leslie Davis to dub the Harput Vilayet “the Slaughterhouse Province.” He estimated that 10,000 Armenians had been massacred and buried in mass graves around Lake Hazar alone.

Syriacs were initially to be deported along with the Armenians, but the deportation order was rescinded the next day (some were deported anyway; those that remained were relocated to Elazığ or emigrated in the 1920s). Armenian Catholics and Protestants were officially exempted from deportation at the request of European diplomats, but this was declared only after the deportation had already taken place. The vali of Harput Vilayet, Sabit Bey, estimated that 51,000 Armenians had been deported from the vilayet by September 1915, and that 4,000 were still in hiding in the villages. Those Armenians who had managed to hide and avoid the first wave of deportations were rounded up and deported or massacred in fall 1915. Davis estimated that an additional 1,000 to 2,000 Armenians were taken to secluded places and killed in November 1915.

Survivors of the genocide from Harput ended up in different parts of the world. Some survivors founded the village of Nor Kharberd in Soviet Armenia in 1929. The village was founded with the help of the Compatriotic Union of Kharpert (Hamakharberdtsʻiakan miutʻiwn), which was founded in the United States in 1926 and established branches in a number of countries.

=== Republican era ===
Harput was largely an abandoned ruin in the 1930s and 1940s, as priority was given to the development of Elazığ. Starting from the 1950s, new interest in and nostalgia for Harput spurred efforts to renovate the old town. Some historic monuments were restored, a new municipality building was built and a museum was opened. Over time, Harput was turned into a suburb of Elazığ, and facilities were created for tourism and recreation. The ruined Armenian neighborhoods of Harput were levelled in the 1960s and 70s. The only church standing in Harput today is the St. Mary Syriac Orthodox Church, which was renovated in the early 2000s․

== Demographics ==
Upon his visit in early 17th century, Simeon of Poland noted that Harpoot had 100 Armenian households and 3 churches. The Armenian population was reduced due to the harsh treatment by the Janissaries ruling the region. Harpoot also housed an Assyrian and Greek population that freely intermarried with the Armenians and also spoke Armenian.

== United States consulate ==
The U.S. consulate in Harpoot started operation from January 1, 1901 with Dr. Thomas H. Norton as the consul. The consulate was established to assist the activities of American missionaries in the region. The Ottoman Ministry of Internal Security gave him a tezkere travel permit, but the Ottoman Ministry of Foreign Affairs initially refused to recognize the consulate.

The building had three stories, a wall, and a garden with mulberry trees.

Leslie A. Davis became consul of Harput in 1914 and left in 1917 upon the cessation of Ottoman Empire-United States relations. Davis stated that this mission was "one of the most remote and inaccessible in the world."

== Attractions ==
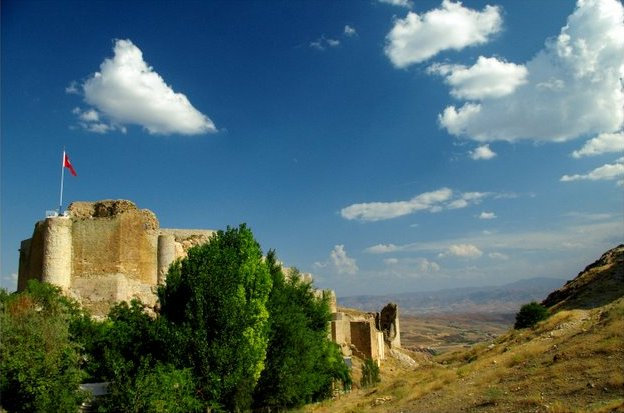
Harput Kalesi (Harput Castle)

- Harput Kalesi (Harput Castle)
- Historic mosques (Cami in Turkish), churches and shrines (Türbe in Turkish).
  - Ulu Camii: Built by Artuqid Sultan Fahrettin Karaaslan in 1156. It is one of the oldest and important structures in Anatolia
  - Sarahatun Camii (also known as Sarayhatun Cami): Built by Sara Hatun, mother of Aq Qoyunlu (White Sheep Turkomans) Sultan Bahadır Han (also known as Uzun Hassan), in 1465 as a small mosque. It was renovated in 1585 and 1843.
  - Kurşunlu Camii: Built between 1738 and 1739 in Harput during the Ottoman era.
  - Alacalı Camii
  - Ağall Camii: built in 1559.
  - Arap Baba Mescidi ve Türbesi: Built during the reign of Seljuk Sultan Gıyaseddin Keyhüsrev III (son of Kılıçarslan IV) in 1279. The shrine contains a mummified body which is popularly known as Arap Baba
  - Fetih Ahmet Baba Türbesi (Shrine of Fetih Ahmed)
  - Mansur Baba Türbesi
  - St. Mary Syriac Orthodox Church
  - Sefik Gul Community Center of Culture

== In fiction ==
Harput is the setting of the romance novel La masseria delle allodole (published in English as Skylark Farm, later adapted into a film) by Antonia Arslan, whose grandfather was born in Harput.

== Notable people ==
- Stephen P. Mugar, was an Armenian businessman in the United States. He was the founder of the Star Market chain of supermarkets in New England.
- Sarkes Tarzian, was an Ottoman-born American engineer, inventor, and broadcaster. He was ethnic Armenian born in the Ottoman Empire.
- J. Michael Hagopian, was an Armenian-born American Emmy-nominated filmmaker.

== See also ==
- Sophene
- Mamuret-ul-Aziz Vilayet
