= Elazığ Gazi Caddesi =

Urban design project in Elazığ, Turkey

- Elazığ Gazi Caddesi Kentsel Tasarım Projesi
- Interactive map of Elazığ Gazi Caddesi
- Location: Elazığ, Turkey
- Coordinates: 38°40′31.51″N 39°12′55.27″E
- Area: 1.2 ha (3.0 acres)
- Created: 2005; 21 years ago
- Designer: Günay Erdem, Serpil Öztekin Erdem
- Operator: Elazığ Municipality

Elazığ Gazi Caddesi (Turkish: Elazığ Gazi Caddesi Kentsel Tasarımı) is the first urban design project in Elazığ, Turkey.

== Geography ==
The 1.2 ha (3.0 acres) Elazığ Gazi Caddesi is at the historical center of Elazığ. Its altitude is 1,072 m (3,517 ft). It starts from in front of the Elazığ Öğretmenevi and continues 300 m (980 ft) to the west.

== History ==
Since inception of the Elazığ, Gazi Caddesi was always a major gathering place for the people. As the growth of the city of Elazığ step by step site surrounded by the high density mix used buildings. At 2005 Municipality of Elazığ completed the application of Gazi Caddesi urban design project and opened to the public.

== Design ==
Elazığ Gazi Caddesi urban design project was developed in 2004 by Turkish landscape architect Serpil Öztekin Erdem.
