= Leslie Davis (diplomat) =

American diplomat

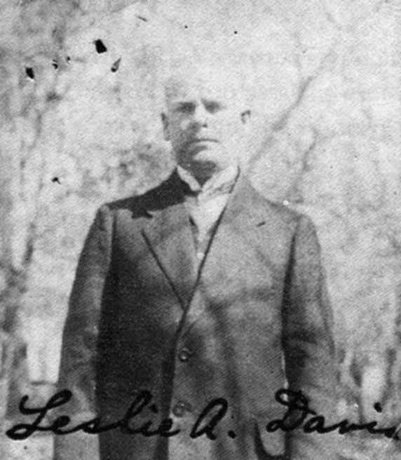
Leslie Davis

Leslie A. Davis (April 29, 1876 – 1960) was an American diplomat and wartime US consul to Harput, Ottoman Empire from 1914 to 1917, who witnessed the Armenian genocide.

== Biography ==
Leslie Davis was born on April 29, 1876, in Port Jefferson, New York. In 1909–1911 Davis worked in New York City as a lawyer. He started his diplomatic career in Batumi, then traveled through Uzbekistan and Caucasus. From 1914 to 1917 he was the US consul to Harput, Ottoman Turkey. In May 1918 he was appointed as the United States representative in Arkhangelsk, Russia, then moved to Helsinki.

== Witnessing the Armenian Genocide ==
While working as US consul to Harput, Leslie Davis personally witnessed how huge clusters of Armenian populations, who were being deported from provinces outside Harput to the Der Zor desert in Syria, were rerouted in Harput “only to be butchered in this province”. Some of his observations concerned the condition of Armenian deportees arriving from further north. He noted that there were no men in these convoys, and the remaining surviving members were much abused, starved and exhausted.

Leslie Davis was among the mixed party of Americans who examined the mass graves of Armenians killed near Harput. Davis subsequently wrote a vivid account to the Department of State where he described the tens of thousands of Armenian corpses in and around Lake Geoljuk (present-day Lake Hazar), during his trips to the lake.

The mass deportations ordered by the Turks, in which hundreds of thousands of Armenians were crammed into freight cars and shipped hundreds of miles to die in the desert or at the hands of killing squads, were far worse than a straightforward massacre, he wrote. “In a massacre many escape, but a wholesale deportation of this kind in this country means a longer and perhaps even more dreadful death for nearly everyone.”

Leslie Davis aided some Armenians by allowing some 80 of them to live in his consulate and organizing an underground railroad to get other Armenians to cross the Euphrates River and into Russia. He acted even though there were warnings by the Turkish government to not aid any Armenians.

While carrying out his rescue work, Davis kept up with his diplomatic work and periodically met with Harput governor Sabit Bey, who was one of the perpetrators of the Armenian Genocide.

== Books ==
- Davis L. A., The Slaughterhouse Province. An American Diplomat's Report on the Armenian Genocide, 1915–1917, ed. by Susan X. Blair, N.Y., 1989

His reports were dramatised in a BBC Radio 4 play, 'The Light of Darkness', broadcast on 4 September 2011. It was written by Louis Nowra, a playwright who has researched Davis's life and work and the history of Harput.

== See also ==
- Henry Morgenthau Sr.
- Witnesses and testimonies of the Armenian genocide
- Makhmourian G., The Theme of the Armenian Genocide in the US Historiography(1985-1994). "Historical-Philological Journal," Yerevan, 1995, No 1, p. 39-52, (in Russian) http://research.sci.am/gmakhmourian
