= Elazığ Botanical Park =

Park in Elazığ, Turkey

- Elazığ Botanik Park
- Interactive map of Elazığ Botanical Park
- Location: Elazığ, Turkey
- Coordinates: 38°39′37.63″N 39°09′41.93″E
- Area: 1.5 ha (3.7 acres)
- Created: 2009; 17 years ago
- Designer: Günay Erdem, Serpil Öztekin Erdem
- Operator: Elazığ Municipality

Elazığ Botanical Park (Turkish: Elazığ Botanik Park) is the first botanical park at the central and eastern parts of Turkey.

== Geography ==
The 1.5 ha (3.7 acres) park is at the western part of the center of Elazığ. Its altitude is 1,100 m (3,600 ft). It is surrounded by Abdullah Paşa District to the west, Sport Center to the north, High School to the east and, Gazi Caddesi to the south.

== History ==
As the growth of the city of Elazığ step by step site surrounded by the high density residential buildings. At 2009 Municipality of Elazığ established Elazığ Botanical Park and opened to the public.

== Design ==
Elazığ Botanical Park was designed on 2007 by Turkish landscape architect Serpil Öztekin Erdem.
