= Yemişlik, Elazığ =

Village in Turkey

Yemişlik
- Neighbourhood
- Location in Turkey
- Coordinates: 38°36′49″N 39°12′11″E
- Country: Turkey
- Province: Elazığ
- District: Elazığ
- Municipality: Elazığ
- Population (2021): 1,028
- Time zone: UTC+3 (TRT)

Yemişlik is a neighbourhood of the city of Elazığ, Elazığ Province in Turkey. Its population is 1,028 (2021).
