= Fırat University =

Turkish public university located in Elazığ

- Fırat Üniversitesi
- Former names: Elazığ Technical College, Elazığ State Academy of Engineering and Architecture
- Type: Public research university
- Established: 1975; 51 years ago
- Rector: Fahrettin Göktaş
- Academic staff: 1,134
- Administrative staff: 339
- Students: 31,361
- Undergraduates: 29,164
- Postgraduates: 1,682
- Doctoral students: 515
- Location: Elazığ, Turkey
- Campus: Urban
- Language: Turkish and English
- Colors: Burgundy and white
- Affiliations: EUA; CUA; BAUNAS
- Website: www.firat.edu.tr

University rankings

Regional – Overall
- QS Emerging Europe and Central Asia: 221-230 (2022)

Fırat University is a public research university in Elazığ, Turkey. The university, founded in 1975, is named after the Turkish name for the Euphrates River, which originates near Elazığ. It is a prominent academic institution in Eastern Turkey, consisting of twelve schools, four institutes, one conservatory, three vocational schools, and twenty-one research centers. The university emphasizes scientific and technological development and research, contributing significantly to the academic landscape of the region.

== History ==
Fırat University traces its origins to the Elazığ Technical College, which was established in 1967. It was later renamed the Elazığ State Academy of Engineering and Architecture before being officially established as Fırat University in 1975. The university's foundation was built around the School of Veterinary Medicine, which became its core program and structure. The School of Veterinary Medicine itself was founded in 1970 as a branch of Ankara University in Elazığ.

== Academics ==
The university offers a wide range of undergraduate and graduate programs across its various faculties and vocational schools.

Fırat University Medical and Dental School is a proud participant in the Erasmus Exchange Program, offering incoming medical students a range of clinical courses in both English and Turkish. The faculty features a newly built library equipped with an extensive collection of scientific and medical resources, supporting both education and research.

== Affiliations ==
The university is a member of the Caucasus University Association.

Fırat University Hospital serves as a teaching hospital, providing care to a large number of outpatients and inpatients daily. The campus is enhanced by spacious gardens, multiple social areas, and modern sports facilities.
