= Harpoot Female Seminary =

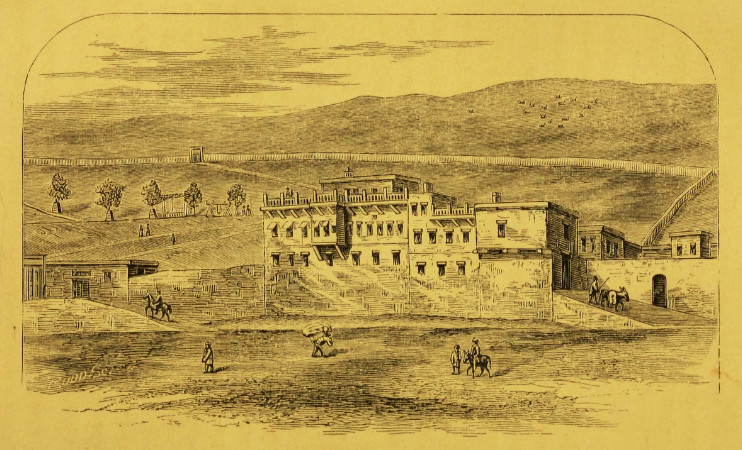
Harpoot Female Seminary (1868)

Harpoot Female Seminary was a 19th-century girls' school in Harpoot, Turkey. It was established in 1858 by American missionary, Susan Anna Brookings Wheeler.

== Grounds ==
The female seminary building was situated in the centre of the mission premises, in the outskirts of the city. From its battlemented roof, looking southward, one could view 50 villages scattered over the plain 1,000 feet (300 m) below, and encircled by mountain peaks.

== Architecture and fittings ==
=== First schoolroom ===
The first schoolroom was originally in the lower story (previously, the stable of an Armenian merchant). It was spacious, and somewhat chapel-like, with its two substantial pillars in the centre. There were neatly whitewashed walls, with a space colored black extending around the sides, to serve for various crayon exercises. Its ceiling was of uneven rafters made from the trunks of trees, from which the bark was simply peeled. The floor was of wood. There were comfortable chairs and desks. Due to the building's low position, and small, high windows on one side opening upon a close, narrow street, shut in from the breezes by a wall of houses opposite, very small chance was afforded for free ventilation; at times, the air was almost stifling.

=== 1876 schoolroom ===
In ca. 1876, the first schoolroom was exchanged for a larger one in an upper story, where light and air had free access. It occupied the left of the second story, and the teachers' rooms were in the same story, at the right. The girls' rooms, recitation-rooms, dining-room, and kitchen occupied the lower story. Adjoining this, on the right, was the Bible depository; and on its shelves repose, also, histories, atlases, gazetteers, and unabridged dictionaries. Nearly 90,000 copies of the Bible, or parts of it, and other printed books, were sold at the station.

== History ==
The missionaries, Dr. Crosby Wheeler, and his wife, Susan Anna Brookings Wheeler, arrived in Harpoot in 1857. Dr. Wheeler became the first president of Euphrates College.

Mr. Wheeler related that once he said to an Armenian, "There is one duty which you neglect, that of teaching girls to read." In reply, it was affirmed that this is not a duty, and that women ought to remain ignorant. Mr. Wheeler asked, "But have they no souls?". "If they have souls," was the reply, "why are they women?" This sentiment was illustrated in the founding of the Female Seminary at Harpoot. (Mrs. M. B. Norton, Life and Light for Women, August 1876)

In 1858, Mrs. Wheeler gathered together on a house-top a group of young girls to teach them the rudiments of education and of the Christian religion, hoping to fit them to be wives of native pastors and teachers of their country. Wheeler could read the spoken language of the people, but could not speak it freely. The women of Harpoot could talk with ease, but they could not read; and so the instruction became mutual.

Soon after the training of young men for teachers and native pastors began, in the early history of the mission, it was felt that their wives must also receive the benefits of instruction in order to become suitable helpmeets, and companions in the work. A school was opened for the wives, and every married student required to bring his wife to be educated. Frequently the women were very unwilling to come; and ludicrous scenes were reported as the result of compulsion on the part of the husbands.

In that land, in that era, marriage took place at an early age; so that many of the young theological students were not only husbands, but fathers of families. They were provided with houses to live in; and, consequently, both husbands and wives were day-scholars. The women attended to their simple household service early in the morning, then sent their older children to school, and took their young ones with them to the seminary. Here one room was devoted to the babies, under the charge of a nurse. Rope hammocks were stretched across all the angles of the room, in which swung the babies, while the mothers were studying their primers and New Testaments in the schoolroom.

For the first few years, the pupils were almost exclusively wives of native helpers or those to become such. Nearly all of them were mothers of families, and in one or two instances even grandmothers. Mrs. Wheeler being obliged to return to the U.S., the school was placed in care of Miss West and Miss Fritcher, in 1865, during the suspension of the Seminary at Marsovan. Misses West and Fritcher were succeeded in the care of the school by Miss Pond, Miss Warfield, and afterwards by Misses Seymour and Bush.

Public sentiment, so opposed at first to the education of women, changed rapidly in its favor. In a few years, there were 1,100 girls in Protestant and Armenian schools.

By 1878, 150 women and girls had graduated, all but two of them professing Christians. Nearly 100 others received more or less instruction in the school. The number of pupils in the seminary, according to the report of 1878, was sixty.

== Boarding school ==
The school assumed definite shape as a boarding-school in 1860. Girls from different cities and villages were received in the school as boarders, on condition that they would not marry any one not a teacher or preacher, without the consent of those in charge of the school.

== Course of study ==
The course of study for the married woman was four years in length, corresponding to the time spent by their husbands in the Theological School. A better preparation was required of the girls; and they were able to finish their course in three years. The school was in session from early spring till autumn of each year; and a vacation of four months enabled both teachers and students to go touring among the mountain villages in winter, when the people were at their homes, and most accessible to religious effort.

Half past eight o'clock, the outer door was closed, and t devotional exercises began. When these concluded, the primary classes filed off to their recitation-rooms, and the first class seated themselves in a row on the floor in front of the table for a Bible lesson, followed by recitations of different studies during the morning hours, with a ten or fifteen minutes recess, when the mothers would go to the nursery, to look after their young children. An hour's intermission took place at noon, after which they again assembled, and filled up the time till four o'clock with various exercises. The schoolday closed with prayer.
