= Levent Sahinkaya =

Turkish diplomat

Turkish Ambassador to Luxembourg
- Incumbent
- Assumed office 2012

Turkish Ambassador to Libya
- In office 2009–2011

Turkish Ambassador to Kenya
- In office 2008–2009

Personal details
- Born: Istanbul, Turkey
- Education: University of Grenoble

Levent Sahinkaya is the current Turkish ambassador to Djibouti. He played a role in negotiating the release of four New York Times journalists who were held captive in Libya for six days.

== Early life and education ==
Sahinkaya was born in Istanbul in 1959. He attended Saint Joseph High School and graduated from Grenoble University, where he studied industrial economics.

== Career ==
Sahinkaya held various political positions before becoming Ambassador to Libya. He worked at the Embassy in Dakar in 1986 and the Consulate in Düsseldorf in 1988. He worked in the Embassy in Paris in 1993 and the Embassy in Bern in 1999. From March 2008 to October 2009, he served as Turkey's Ambassador to Kenya. He was appointed Turkey's Ambassador to Libya in 2009 and continues to hold the position.

=== Release of journalists in Libya ===
In March 2011, four New York Times journalists reporting in Libya went missing. They had entered Libya through the Egyptian border without visas and were captured by forces loyal to Muammar Gaddafi. ABC News reports that "Turkey's ambassador in Tripoli, Levent Sahinkaya, held talks with Libyan intelligence agencies and reached an agreement for a handover on Sunday [20 March]". The release instead occurred the next morning due to air strikes by U.N. coalition troops. Sahinkaya picked up the journalists on Monday morning and took them to Turkey's Embassy in Tripoli. From there, they were able to cross into Tunisia. Bill Keller, executive editor of the New York Times, remarked "We're particularly indebted to the Government of Turkey, which intervened on our behalf to oversee the release of our journalists and bring them to Tunisia."
