= Coşkun Şahinkaya =

Turkish footballer

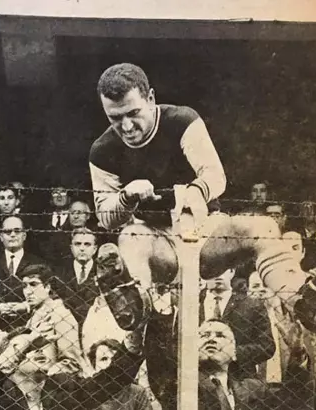

Personal information
- Full name: Coşkun Şahinkaya
- Date of birth: 1 January 1942
- Place of birth: Trabzon, Türkiye
- Date of death: 11 December 2023 (aged 81)
- Place of death: İstanbul
- Height: 1.72 m (5 ft 8 in)
- Position: Midfielder

Youth career
- 1956-1960: Trabzon İdmangücü

Senior career*
Years	Team	Apps	(Gls)
1960-1967	Ankaragücü		
1967-1970	Trabzonspor		
- * Club domestic league appearances and goals

Coşkun Şahinkaya (1 January 1942 – 11 December 2023), also known as Gabak Coşkun, was a Turkish professional footballer. Şahinkaya was the second ever captain for Trabzonspor.

== Personal life ==
Şahinkaya was one of 7 children, 6 sons and 1 daughter. His father İbrahim and eldest brother Yılmaz were amateur footballers in their youth. His brothers Güngör and Bülent were professional footballers who also played for Trabzonspor.
