= Harput Castle =

2800 years old, White Colored Castle in Eastern Anatolia, Turkey

Coordinates: 38.7034°N 39.2574°E

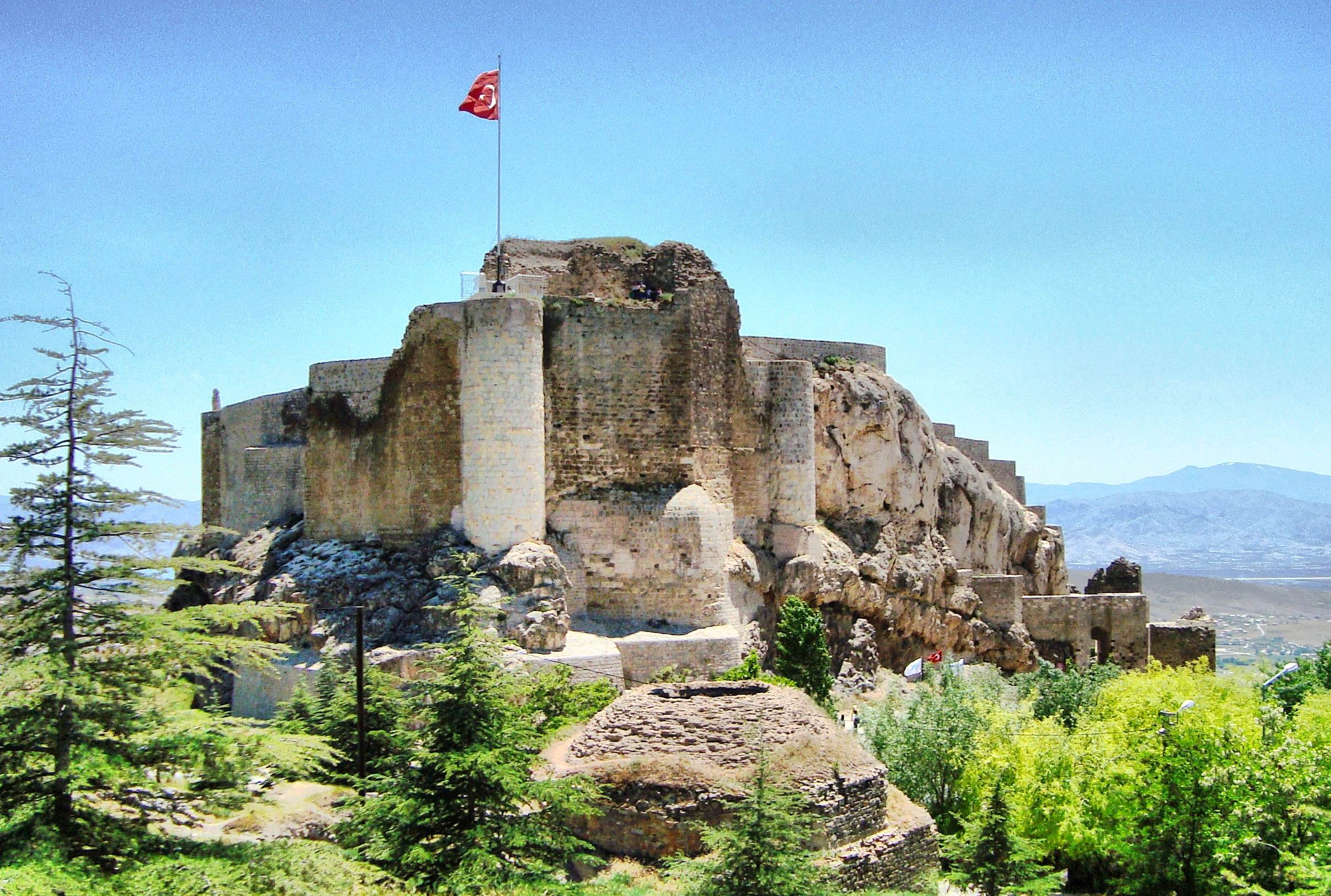
A side view of Harput Castle

Harput Castle, also known as Milk Castle (Turkish: Harput Kalesi, Süt Kalesi), is a castle located in the historical Harput neighborhood within the borders of the current Elazığ Province, Turkey. It was built by the Urartians on a rectangular plan. The castle consists of two parts, internal and external. According to legend, a scarcity of water and abundance of milk during its construction meant that milk was added to the castle's mortar, leading to it being sometimes called "Milk Castle".

== History ==
The castle was built by the Urartu Kingdom in the 8th century BC. It came under Persian domination in the 6th century BC. Between the 4th century BC and the 11th century AD, the castle was under Armenian (Armenian: Խարպերդի Վանք), Roman, Sassanid, Byzantine Empire, Abbasid, and again Byzantine Empire rule until the end of the 11th century. Çubukoğulları reigned in 1085, Artukoğulları in 1112 and Seljuks in 1234. The castle became the center of government of the Artuqid Bey Belek Ghazi and Seljuk Bey Alaeddin Keykubad, and in 1366 it changed hands many times due to the struggle between Dulkadiroğulları and Akkoyunlu States. The castle was taken over by the Akkoyunlu ruler Hasan Bahadır Han in 1465 and put under the administration of Akkoyunlu. Harput Region and Fortress were taken over by the Ottoman Empire during the rule of Yavuz Sultan Selim in 1515.

== Restoration work ==
With the permission of the Ministry of Culture and Tourism of Turkey, the latest restoration work started in 2005 under the consultancy of Veli Sevin and continued until 2009. At the same time, efforts to save the Ottoman Neighborhood within Harput Castle which was inhabited from the mid-17th to the early 20th century, was also carried out within the scope of Ottoman Archeology.

== Gallery ==
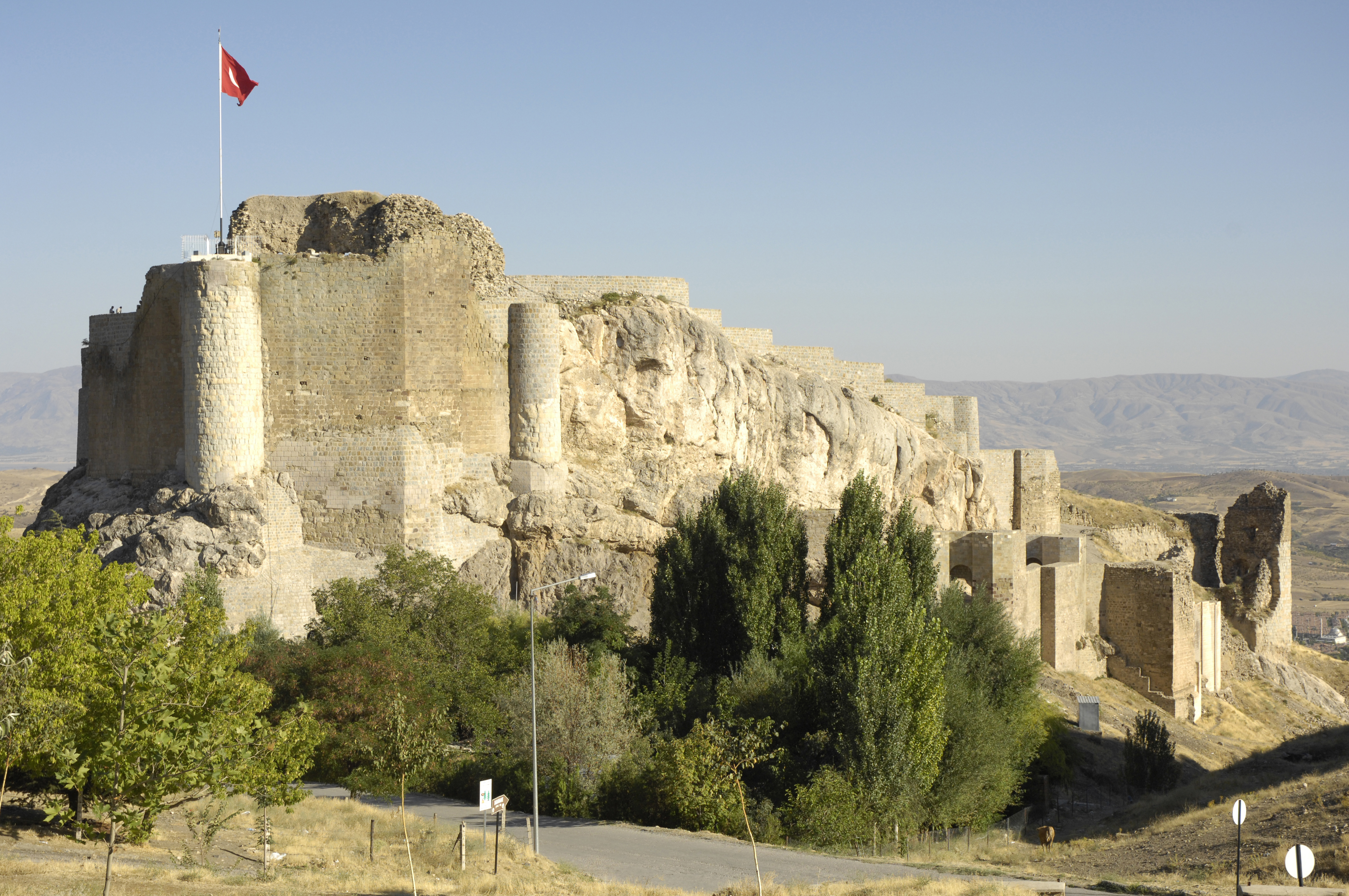

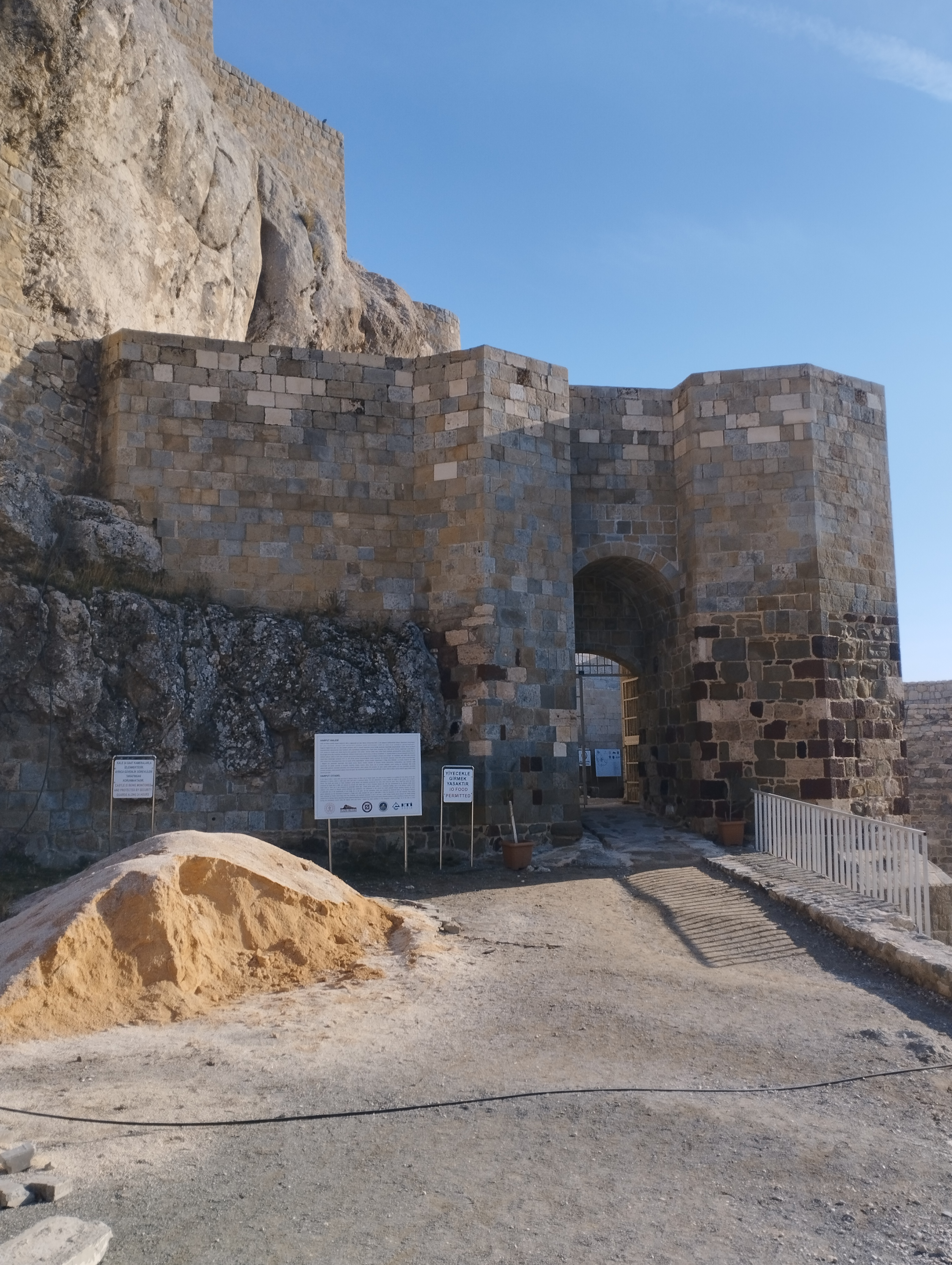

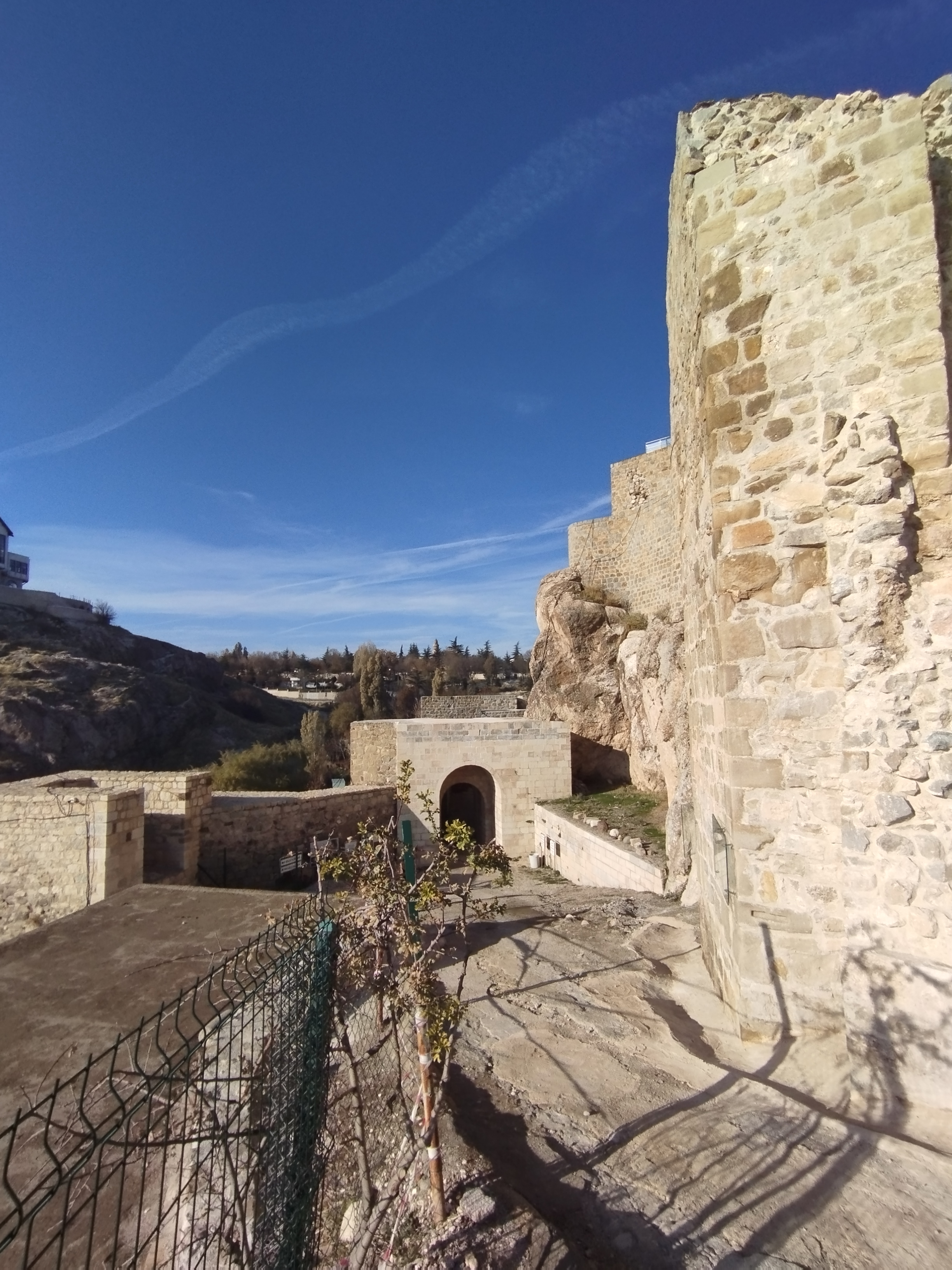

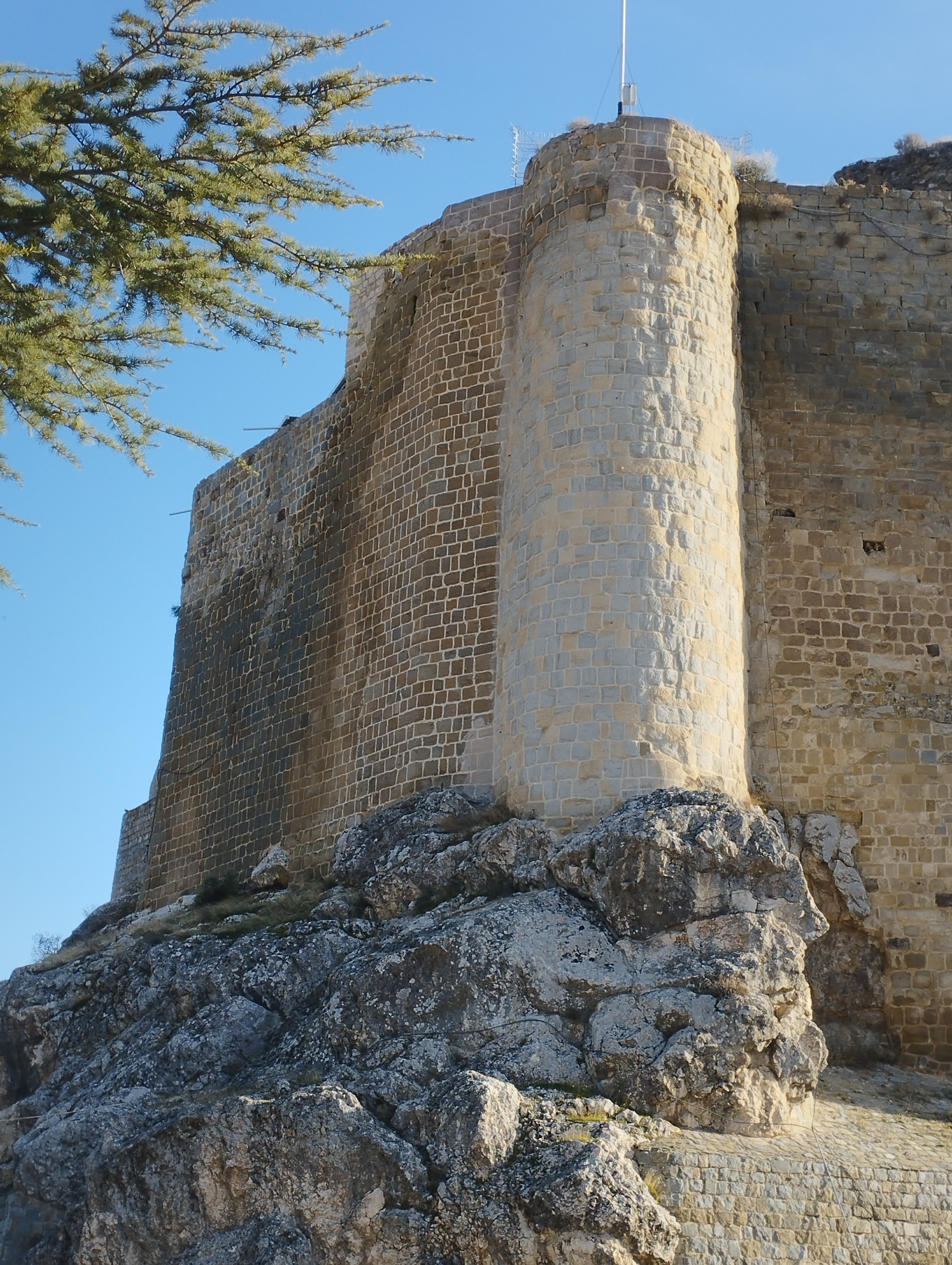

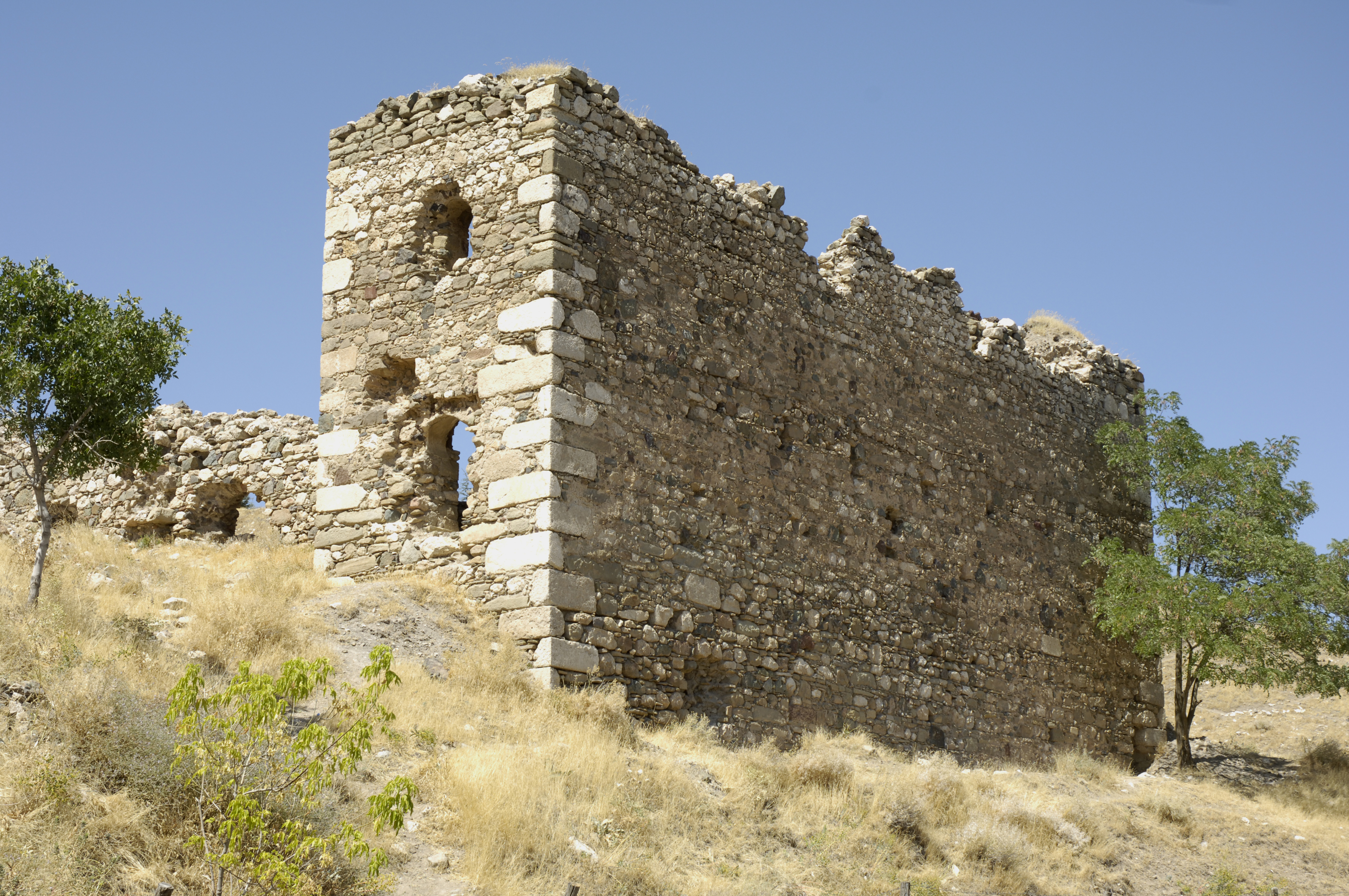

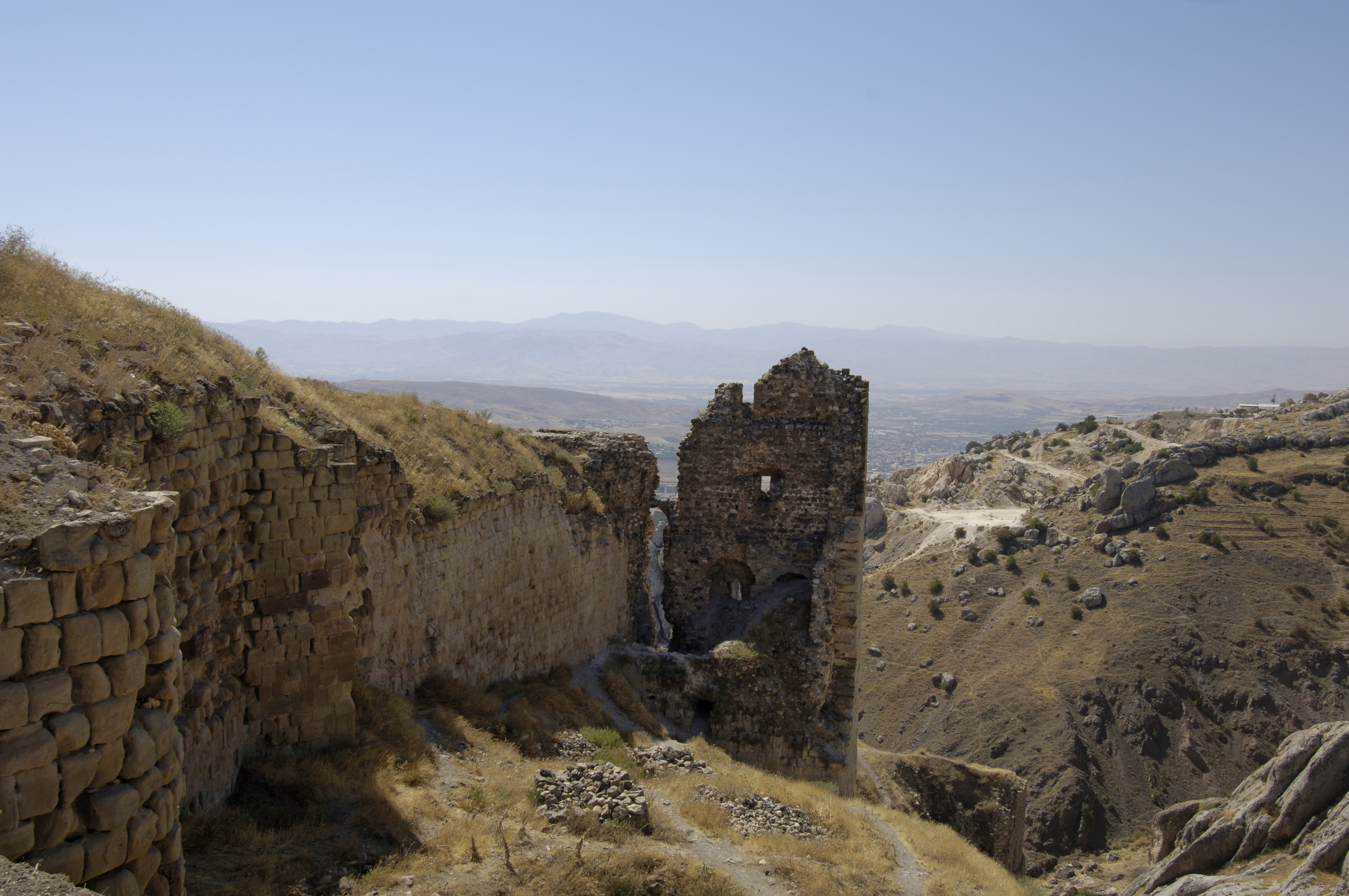

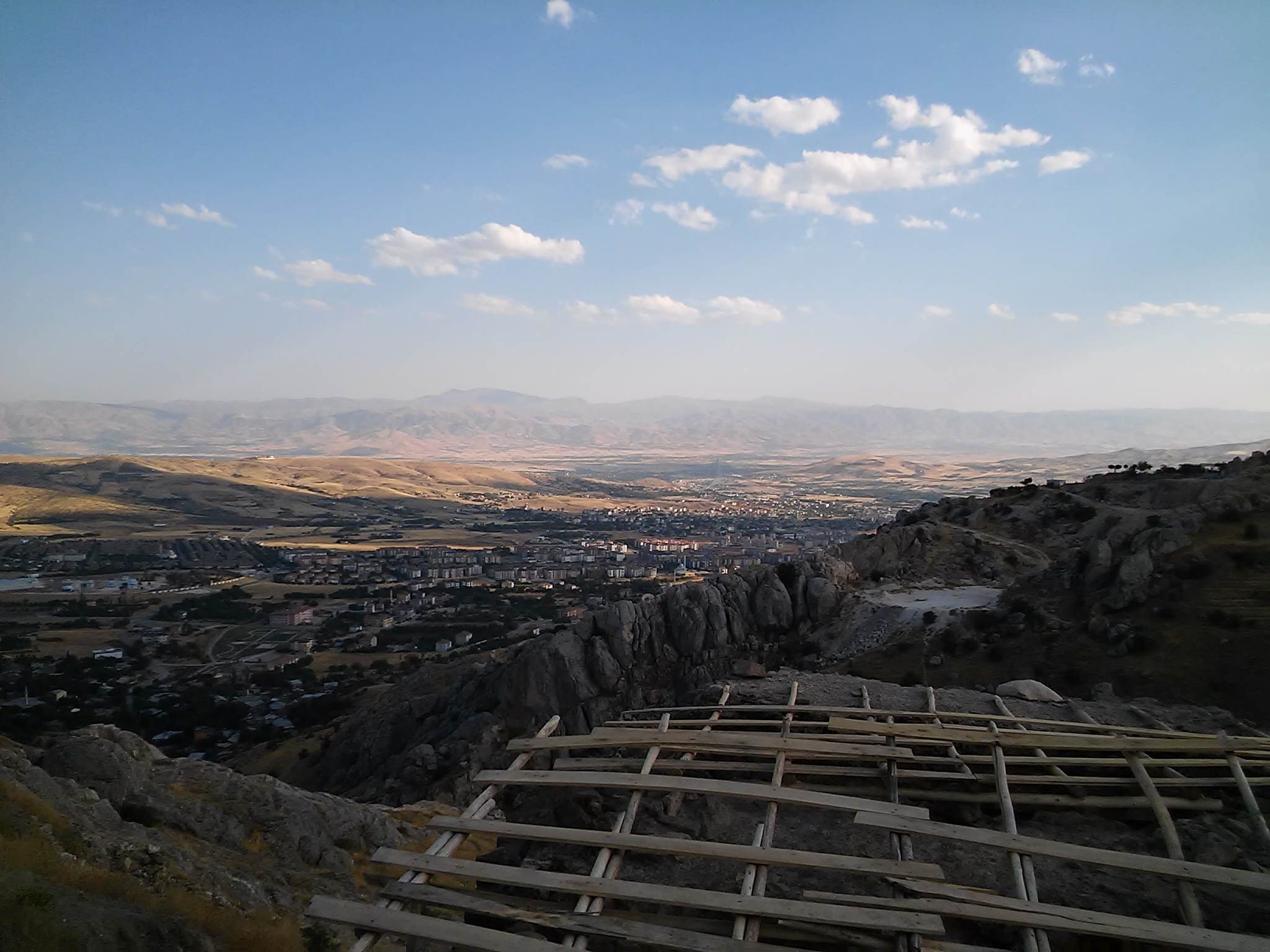

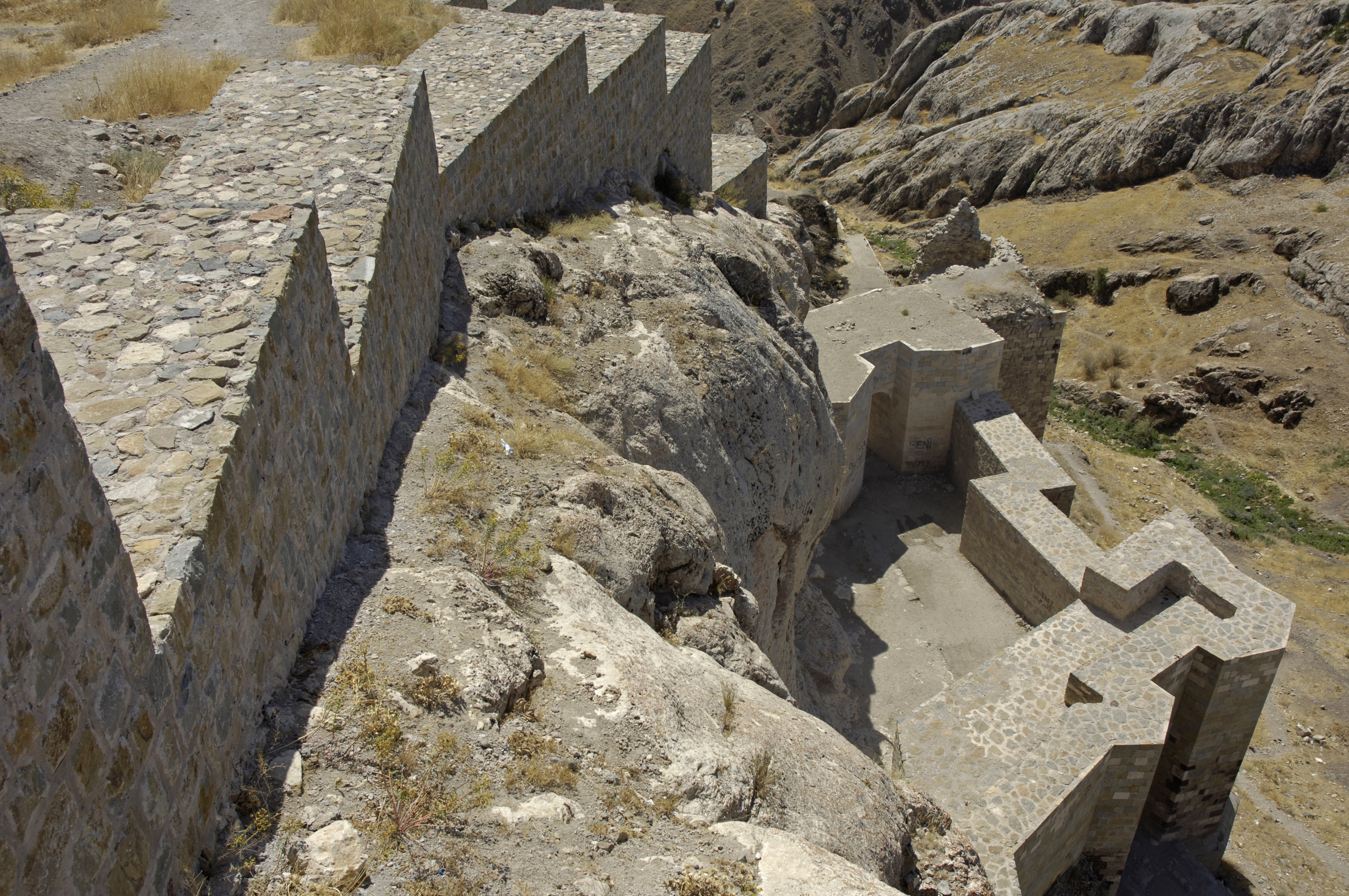

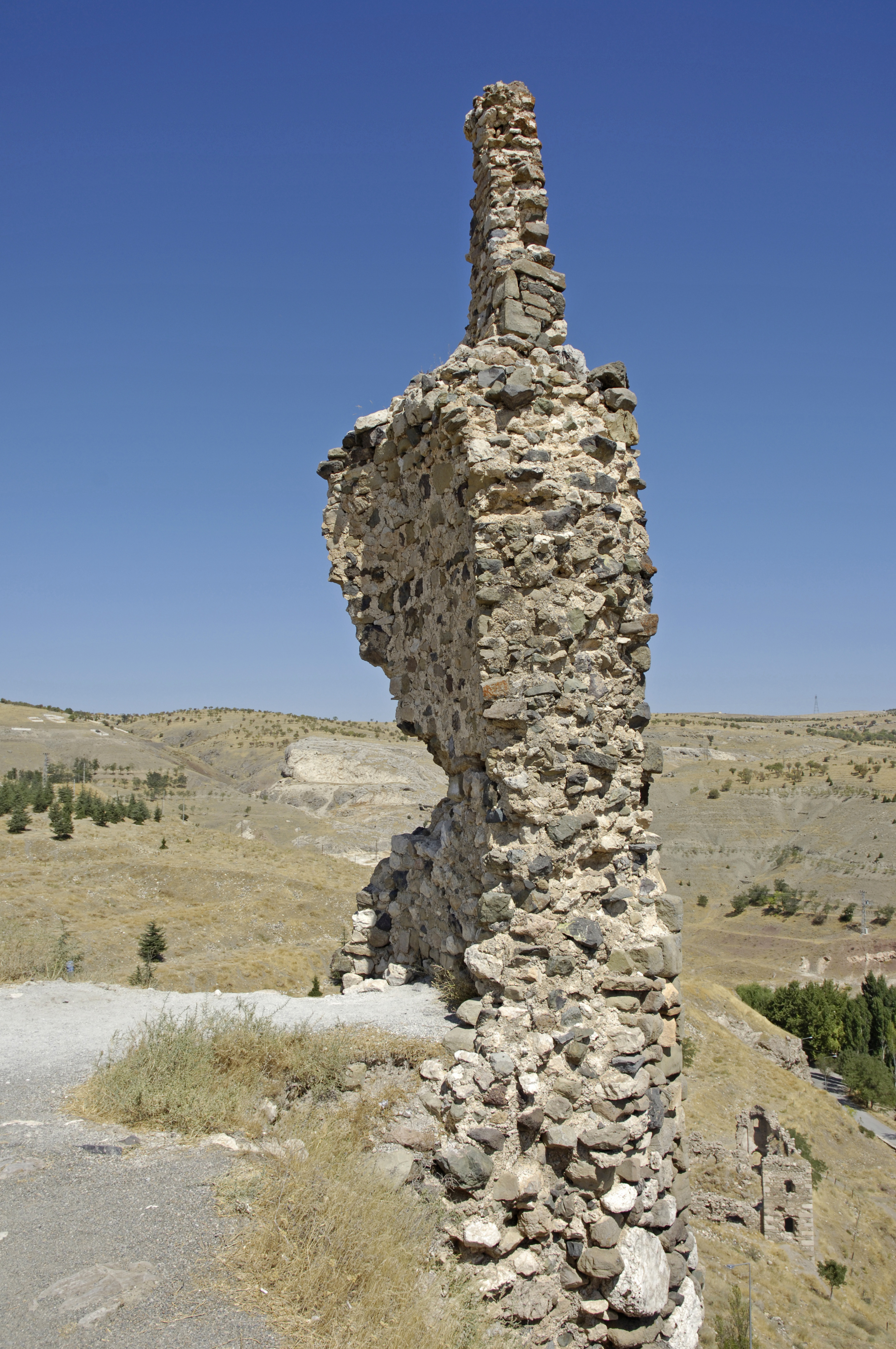
