= Nor Kharberd =

Nor Kharberd Նոր Խարբերդ
- Location within Armenia Location within Ararat
- Coordinates: 40°05′21″N 44°28′40″E
- Country: Armenia
- Province: Ararat
- Municipality: Masis

Population (2011)
  - Total: 7,366
- Time zone: UTC+4

Nor Kharberd (Armenian: Նոր Խարբերդ) is a village in the Masis Municipality of the Ararat Province of Armenia, located 4 kilometers south of Yerevan. Also there are population of Yazidis.

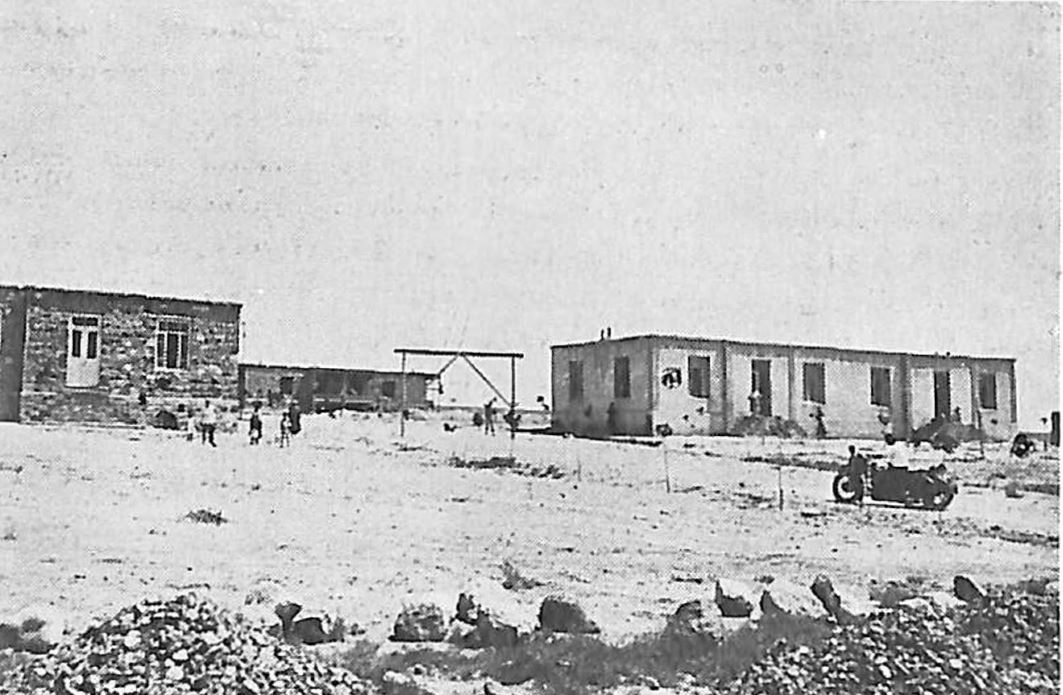
Nor Kharbed at the beginning of the 1930s.

The village was founded in 1929 as Nor Kharberd. In 1938, it was renamed as Nor Kyank, however, in 1965 it was again renamed as Nor Kharberd. Since 1955, Nor Kharberd was an urban type location in the Masis district of Armenian SSR. Currently, Nor Kharberd is included in the Ararat region of Armenia as village type community.
