= Bülent Şahinkaya =

Turkish footballer

Personal information
- Full name: Bülent Şahinkaya
- Date of birth: 1 January 1948
- Place of birth: Trabzon, Turkey
- Date of death: 29 June 2009 (aged 61)
- Place of death: Istanbul, Turkey
- Height: 1.74 m (5 ft 9 in)
- Position: Midfielder

Senior career*
Years	Team	Apps	(Gls)
1968-1970	Trabzonspor	38	(6)
1970-1971	İstanbulspor	7	(0)
1971-1975	Trabzonspor	66	(1)
1975-1976	Galatasaray	2	(0)
- * Club domestic league appearances and goals

Bülent Şahinkaya (1 January 1948 - 29 June 2009), also known as Küçük Bülent, was a Turkish former professional footballer. Şahinkaya was the captain of Trabzonspor when they were promoted to the Süper Lig for the first time.

== Personal life ==
Şahinkaya was one of 7 children, 6 sons and 1 daughter. His father İbrahim and eldest brother Yılmaz were amateur footballers in their youth. His brothers Coşkun and Güngör were professional footballers who also played for Trabzonspor. Şahinkaya died on 29 June 2009, and was buried in Istanbul.

== Honours ==
Trabzonspor

- TFF First League: 1973-74

Galatasaray

- Turkish Cup: 1975=76
