= Güngör Şahinkaya =

Turkish footballer

Personal information
- Full name: Güngör Şahinkaya
- Date of birth: 1 August 1954 (age 72)
- Place of birth: Trabzon, Turkey
- Height: 1.74 m (5 ft 9 in)
- Position: Midfielder

Youth career
- 1971-1976: Trabzonspor

Senior career*
Years	Team	Apps	(Gls)
1976-1986	Trabzonspor	196	(3)
1986-1987	Zonguldakspor	12	(0)

International career
1980–1984	Turkey	6	(0)
- * Club domestic league appearances and goals

Güngör Şahinkaya (born 1 August 1954) is a Turkish former professional footballer best known for his years with Trabzonspor from 1976 to 1986.

== International career ==
Şahinkaya represented the Turkey national football team six times. Şahinkaya debuted for Turkey in a friendly 3-0 win over Saudi Arabia on 10 March 1980.

== Personal life ==
Şahinkaya was one of 7 children, 6 sons and 1 daughter. His father İbrahim and eldest brother Yılmaz were amateur footballers in their youth. His brothers Coşkun and Bülent were professional footballers who also played for Trabzonspor.

== Honours ==
Trabzonspor

- Süper Lig: 1975-76, 1976-77, 1978-79, 1979-1980, 1980-81, 1983-84
- Turkish Cup: 1976-77, 1977-78, 1983-84
- Turkish Super Cup: 1975-76, 1976-77, 1978-79, 1979-1980, 1982-83
- Prime Minister's Cup: 1977-78, 1984-85
