= Şahinkaya, Elazığ =

Village in Turkey

Şahinkaya
- Neighbourhood
- Location in Turkey
- Coordinates: 38°41′34″N 39°8′37″E
- Country: Turkey
- Province: Elazığ
- District: Elazığ
- Municipality: Elazığ
- Population (2021): 2,057
- Time zone: UTC+3 (TRT)

Şahinkaya is a neighbourhood of the city of Elazığ, Elazığ Province in Turkey. Its population is 2,057 (2021). It became a quarter of Elazığ in 2020. The village is populated by Kurds.
