= Frederick G. Coan =

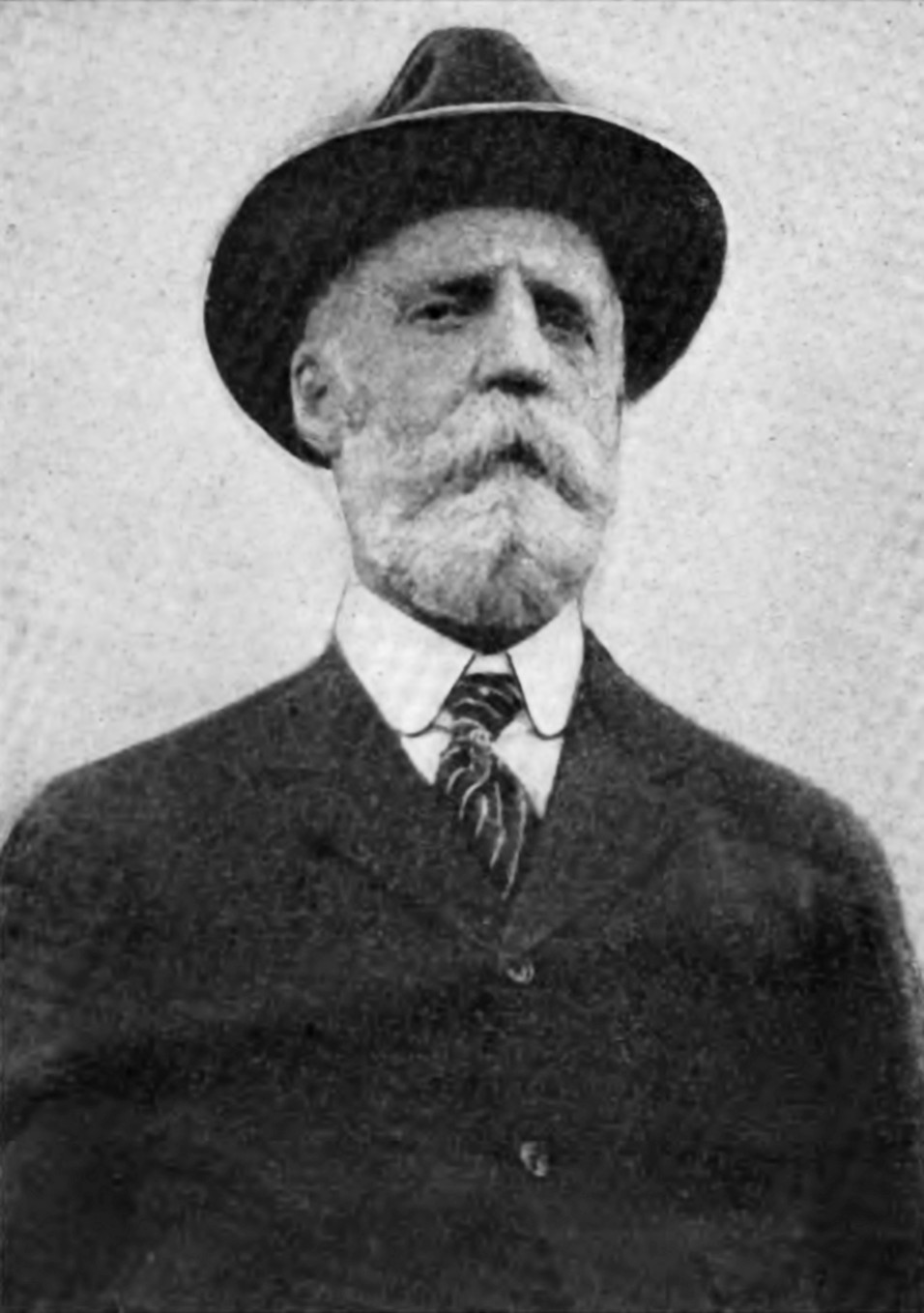
- Born: 23 May 1859; Urumia, Persia
- Died: 23 March 1943 (aged 83); Concord, Ohio, United States
- Occupations: Christian missionary and witness to the Armenian genocide

Frederick G. Coan (23 May 1859 – 23 March 1943) was a Christian missionary who was a witness to the Armenian genocide. Coan served as a missionary in Persia for over 50 years. He was an author of many books including Yesterdays in Persia and Kurdistan and has provided detailed eye-witness accounts of massacres of Armenians during the Armenian genocide. Coan believed that the number of dead during the Armenian genocide exceeded one million people. He referred to the Ottoman government's policy towards the Armenians as one of "extermination".

== Early life ==
Frederick Gaylord Coan was born on 23 May 1859 in Urumia, Persia (presently the capital of West Azerbaijan Province, Iran). His parents, George Whitefield and Sarah (Power) Kip Coan, were both pioneering missionaries. Coan grew up in Persia, then left for the United States for his education during the Russo-Turkish War (1877-1878).

At Wooster University in Wooster, Ohio, Coan studied music and planned to become a professional musician. He also met his future wife, Ida Jane Speer, a Presbyterian minister's daughter, whom Coan married in 1885 before returning to the Ottoman Empire. During his sophomore year, Coan helped organize a male quartet. He also played the organ at a local Lutheran church where the quartet sang. Upon graduating from Wooster University in 1882, his mother convinced him to give up his musical dreams and instead continue his studies to become a missionary and return to the Ottoman Empire. Coan thus began studies at the Western Theological Seminary. There, he met Samuel H. Kellogg, a missionary from India, who rekindled Coan's missionary spirit. After graduating from the seminary, he continued his education at Princeton for two more years, graduating in 1884. In 1885, Coan was ordained as a Presbyterian minister.

On 25 July 1885, immediately after their marriage, Coan and his wife sailed to the Middle East. The newlyweds toured Mosul and Baghdad, among other historic places, along the way. In 1904, Coan took charge of the Urumia College, a position he held until 1912.

== Armenian genocide witness ==
=== Background ===
Armenian Christians had been an oppressed (and restive) minority in the Ottoman Empire, often turning to Eastern Orthodox Russia as well as Western Protestant missionaries for protection. Russian troops had been stationed in several eastern Ottoman provinces after the treaty ending the Russo-Turkish war, pending the Ottoman Empire's adoption of reforms, even as modified by the Congress of Berlin in 1878. Moreover, an Armenian nationalist movement which led riots in Constantinople and several eastern provinces had been brutally suppressed in the Hamidian massacres of 1894–1896. Ottoman military officers including Mustafa Kemal Atatürk had seized power from Sultan Abdülhamid II and attempted to establish a constitutional monarchy in the Young Turk Revolution of 1908. The collapsing Ottoman Empire lost its Balkan possessions after Orthodox Christian uprisings in the First Balkan War of 1912–13. At least half a million Muslim Ottomans from the empire's former Balkan possessions sought refuge in Turkey, some seeking revenge against Christians. Muslim Balkan refugees intensified Turkish fears that the empire's Armenian Christian minority—with the assistance or encouragement of Western governments—might also attempt to establish an independent state and thus break up the empire's eastern provinces.

As World War I began in July 1914, the Ottoman Empire's eastern provinces, with their significant Armenian population, became strategically important, both because Russia continued to seek a warm water port and protect its southern border, and as it continued protecting fellow Christians. On 2 January 1915, Kurdish and Turkish regular troops advanced deep into Persia, breaking through Russian lines, and stationed themselves around the Urumia plain, where Coan had been born and had long been stationed. Russian troops advanced across the Turkish border into the heavily Armenian-populated vilayet of Van in early 1915. The Turkish government blamed Armenian disloyalty, and adopted extreme measures later termed the Armenian genocide.

=== Deportations and massacre ===
When the Kurdish and Turkish troops advanced into the eastern Ottoman provinces in January 1915, an estimated 20,000 Armenians and other Christians sought protection in the Urumia plain. Coan managed to provide necessary shelter for these refugees and as many provisions as possible. After five months of caring for the refugees and hearing the Armenian deportations had just begun, Coan made a desperate attempt to travel around those districts and assess the Armenians' situation. Thus, in the summer of 1915, Coan reported:

Then, through deportation, they determined to complete what had already been begun by the sword. The Turkish soldiers, in many cases offered by Germans, drove the Armenians across the plains, perpetrating upon them brutalities that were enough to break anyone's heart. I found one day a great mass of human bones, thirty feet high, and I said to my Turkish guide: "How do you account for this?" He replied: "We got tired of driving them, we got tired of hearing their moans and cries, and took them up that that precipice one day and flung them down to get rid of the job."

At one bridge my Turkish guide said: "We had captured 1,600 maidens, all of them beautiful. We were taking them to be sold in the cities or to be given as gifts to our officers. When those girls reached the middle of the bridge crossing this wild stream, one maiden threw up her arm as a signal and the entire 1,600 dashed themselves into the roaring torrent."

— Frederick G. Coan as part of his report in The New Armenia bi-monthly periodical

Coan later encountered a trench filled with the bones of human bodies:

There was a trench full of human bones, and I was told of the brave fight that 2,000 Armenians, standing for their homes and for the honor of their wives and daughters, had waged with their flintlock rifles against the Turkish troops. They held off a Turkish regiment for two weeks, until their ammunition was exhausted. Then the Turkish officer, taking an oath on the Koran, the most binding of all oaths to Moslems, promised the Armenian fighters that if they surrendered, he would, in deference to their courage, allowed them to go unharmed. These 2,000 men had no sooner surrendered than they were given picks and spades and told to dig a trench. When they had dug it they were shoved in with the bayonet.

Upon seeing more human bones around a church, Coan asked the Turkish guide what had happened. The guide replied, "After we had killed off 30,000 in this district we came to this church and to our surprise found it filled with men, women and children who had sought refuge there, thinking that they might not be discovered." He continued describing the circumstances:

As soon as they saw us coming they barricaded the door. We sat around, making up our minds to starve them to death. We waited forty-eight hours for a sign of surrender, and not a sound came from the church. You might have thought it was a tomb. Then an officer went to the door and called to the priest to come and confer with him, and he said, 'I am here to offer you life and liberty. If you will come out one by one and following your priest repeat the Mohammedan creed, you shall go unscathed.' There was not a word of parley inside; the church door opened and the aged priest, with hoary locks and bared head, stood before that army without a plea, without a word. They understood the meaning, and with one flash of the sword he lay dead. Then several hundred men and women, mothers with their little babes in their arms, fathers and mothers with little boys and girls clinging to them, walked out of that church without a plea, without a tear, without a cry for mercy.

When they exited the church, they were massacred. The Turkish guide said, "as we killed them, not even the children cried." He remarked that they died with a "smile on their face and a strange light in their eyes."

== Later life ==
Coan returned to the United States in 1917 and appealed for the plight of the Armenians through public lectures. During his lectures, he continuously stressed the importance of relief for the Armenians in Syria.

Coan returned to the United States and lived in various cities, such a Minneapolis and Princeton, New Jersey. After finally settling in Claremont, California, Coan had his first book published, Yesterdays in Persia and Kurdistan.

Coan retired from his missionary activities in 1932 after serving for over fifty years. His wife Ida died in 1939 in Claremont. Frederick Coan died in Shreve, Ohio, on 23 March 1943 in the home of a friend. Both he and his wife are buried in the Wooster Cemetery in Wooster, Ohio.

== Works ==
- Yesterdays in Persia and Kurdistan. Saunders Studio Press. 1939. (284 pp.)

== Bibliography ==
- Akçam, Taner (2012). The Young Turks' Crime Against Humanity: The Armenian Genocide and Ethnic Cleansing in the Ottoman Empire. Princeton, New Jersey: Princeton University Press. pp. xv–xix. ISBN 9780691153339.
- Kévorkian, Raymond H. (2011). The Armenian genocide: a complete history (Reprinted. ed.). London: I. B. Tauris. ISBN 978-1-84885-561-8.
- Lieberman, Benjamin (2013). The Holocaust and Genocides in Europe. A&C Black. pp. 51–56. ISBN 9781441194787.
