= Walter M. Geddes =

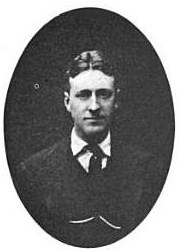
- Born: November 13, 1885; Newark, New Jersey
- Died: November 7, 1915 (aged 29); Smyrna, Ottoman Empire
- Occupation: Businessman
- Known for: Witness to the Armenian genocide

Walter Mackintosh Geddes (November 13, 1885 – November 7, 1915) was an American businessman who was an important witness to the Armenian genocide. His reports provide a detailed account of the situation of the Armenian deportees in the Syrian Desert. While in Aleppo, he witnessed thousands die of exposure and starvation. Greatly saddened and affected by the scenes he witnessed, he ultimately committed suicide on November 7, 1915.

== Early life ==
Geddes was born on November 13, 1885, in Newark, New Jersey, to Alexander Geddes and Susan Isabel Geddes (née Baker). His father was of Scottish descent and his mother was of English descent. He studied at Stevens Institute of Technology for a year and then spent five years in Saskatchewan, Canada and Montana where he traveled. He graduated from Sheffield Scientific School at Yale University in 1911 and married Rebekah Virginia Botsford on October 13, 1912, in Denver, Colorado. In 1912 he became a solicitor for Peters, Byrne & Company who were tree surgeons in Pittsburgh, Pennsylvania. In 1913 he and his wife moved to Asia Minor as a result of his decision to join the licorice business which his father had already established. Their son, George Baker Geddes, was born in Damascus.

== Armenian genocide ==
Geddes left for the Ottoman Empire in March 1913 in search of licorice root to expand his business. Having learned Arabic in order to conduct business locally, he left for Aleppo on September 16, 1915. After first passing an encampment of Armenians at Afyonkarahisar, he went to Konia where he witnessed the separation of a woman and her baby from her husband. The husband was then placed on a train while the woman was "forcibly held behind and kept from getting on the train".

None of these people have any idea where they are going or why they are being exiled. They go day after day along the road with the hope that they may somewhere reach a place where they may be allowed to rest. I saw several old men carrying on their backs the tools of their trade, probably with the hope that they may some day settle down somewhere. The road over the Taurus Mountains in places is most difficult and often times crude conveyances drawn by buffalos, oxen and milk-cows are unable to make the grade and are abandoned and overturned by the gendarmes into the ravine below. The animals are turned loose. I saw several carts, piled high with baggage on the top of which were many Armenians, break down and throw their occupants in the road. One of the drivers, who was a Turk, and who had collected an advance from the people whom he was driving, considered it a huge joke when one woman broke her leg from such a fall.

— Walter M. Geddes reporting about the situation of the deportees

On arrival in Aleppo, Geddes notes that the situation of the Armenians was "beyond description" and that they were "dying by the hundreds a day". He then describes the situation of the British Consulate filled with exiles, saying that "the dead were removed almost every hour" and adding that "coffin-makers throughout the city were working late into the night, making rough boxes for the dead whose relatives or friends could afford to give them decent burial".

Geddes, who left Aleppo and arrived in Damascus, writes that, "several Turks[,] whom I interviewed, told me that the motive of this exile was to exterminate the race". He added that he did not see "any Moslem giving alms to Armenians, it being considered a criminal offence for anyone to aid them". He stated that the situation in Damascus was similar to the situation in Aleppo where hundreds of Armenians were also dying every day. He added that from Damascus, the Armenians were "sent still farther south into the Hauran, where their fate is unknown".

On October 26, 1915, Geddes left Aleppo and headed for Smyrna and passed through Bozanti. He describes the situation near Bozanti as follows:

There seems to be no end to the caravan which moves over the mountain ridge from Bozanti south; throughout the day from sunrise to sunset, the road as far as one can see is crowded with these exiles. Just outside of Tarsus I saw a dead woman lying by the roadside and farther on passed two more dead women, one of whom was being carried by two gendarmes away from the roadside to be buried. Her legs and arms were so emaciated that the bones were nearly through her flesh and her face was swollen and purple from exposure. Farther along, I saw two gendarmes carrying a dead child between them away from the road where they had dug a grave. Many of these soldiers and gendarmes who follow the caravan have spades and as soon as an Armenian dies they take the corpse away from the roadside and bury it.

Geddes also writes about his encounter with a woman who had been in Bozanti for two days and had been unable to eat anything except what travelers had given her:

At many places like Bozanti, for example, where there is an encampment of Turkish soldiers, there is not enough bread for these Armenians and only two hours from Bozanti I met a woman who was crying for bread. She told me that she had been in Bozanti for two days and was unable to obtain anything to eat, except what travelers like myself had given her. Many of the beasts of burden belonging to the Armenians die of starvation. It is not an unusual sight to see an Armenian removing a pack from the dead animal and putting it on his own shoulders. Many Armenians told me that although they were allowed to rest at night, they get no sleep because of the pangs of hunger and cold.

Geddes continues to write about the circumstances of families and children:

Diseases broke out in several places along the road, and in Aleppo several cases of typhus fever among the Armenians were reported when I left. Many families have been separated, the men being sent in one direction and the women and children in another. I saw one woman, who was with child, lying in the middle of the road crying, and over her stood a gendarme threatening her if she did not get up and walk. Many children are born along the way and most of these die as their mothers have no nourishment for them.

Geddes concludes that "the sights that I saw on my return trip were worse than those on my trip going".

== Death ==
George Horton, American Consul General in Smyrna, reported the death of Geddes to the State Department of the United States:

Mr. Geddes committed suicide by shooting himself through the head with a revolver at his room in the Kraemer Hotel of this city early on the morning of the 7th November 1915. He was seen by myself and others on the preceding afternoon and was perfectly sane and natural in his behaviour and manner of talking giving no indication that he contemplated taking away his life. It is the opinion of those who knew him best here that certain experiences which he has passed through since he has been in Turkey preyed heavily upon his mind. He was dragged from his horse at Alexandretta in the month of October 1914 by Turkish soldiers, beaten and otherwise maltreated and thrown into prison. Just recently in returning from Aleppo, he passed for days through the scenes which are resulting from the measures which are being taken against the Armenians by the Turkish Authorities. It was noticed that he was greatly changed and saddened on his return from Aleppo. In dictating to the stenographer of the Consulate General an account of what he saw, he broke down several times. He was particularly affected in speaking of the sufferings and deaths of the children who were perishing in thousands.

He was survived by his wife and their son, who had returned to the United States at the outbreak of World War I.

== See also ==
- Witnesses and testimonies of the Armenian genocide
