= Witnesses and testimonies of the Armenian genocide =

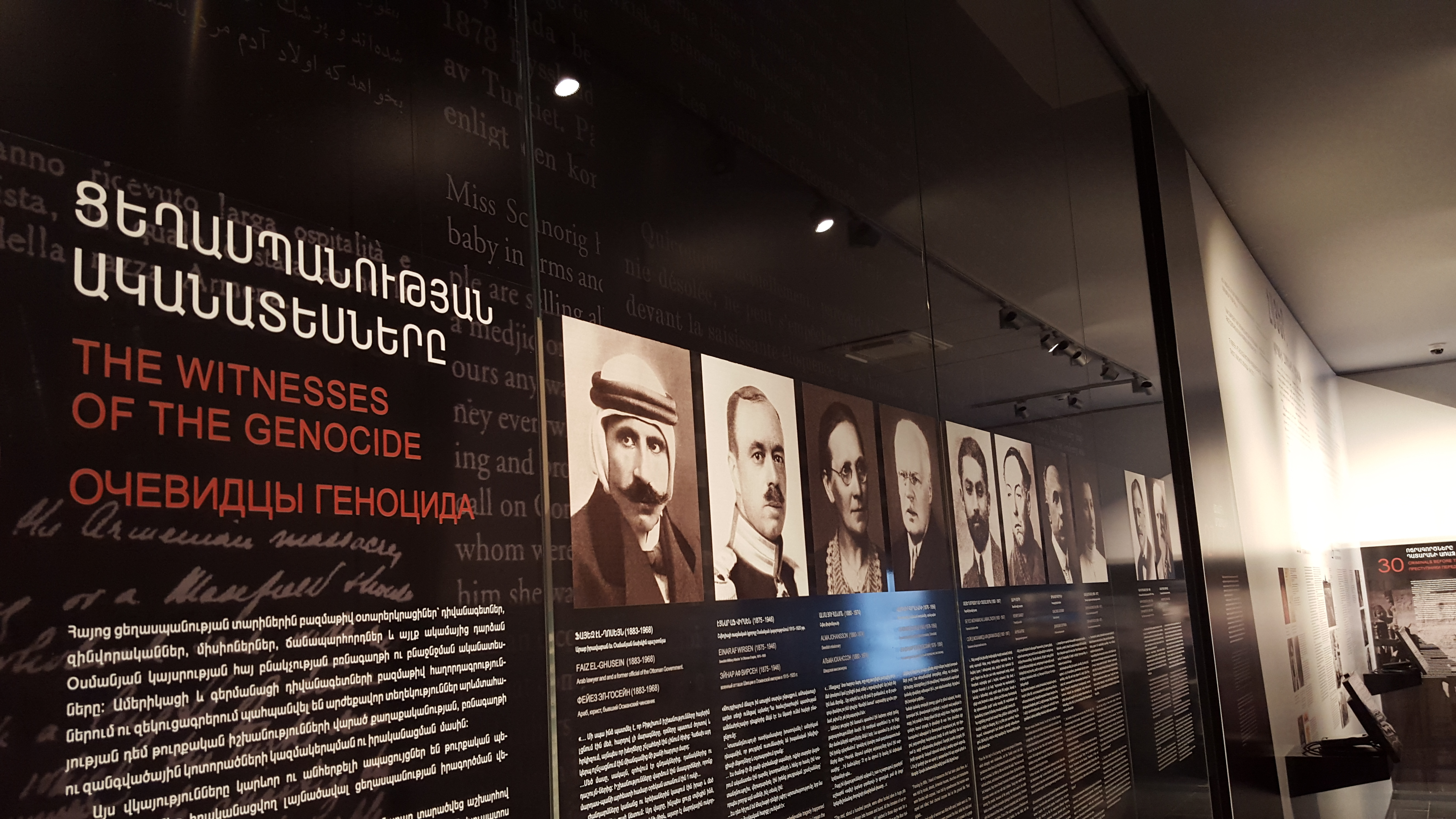
An exhibition dedicated to the witnesses of the genocide at the genocide museum in Yerevan.

"It may look amazing, but the reality that what happened in 1915 was a mass murder was accepted by everybody having lived in that period, and was never the object of an argument."

— Taner Akçam

Witnesses and testimony provide an important and valuable insight into the events which occurred both during and after the Armenian genocide. The Armenian genocide was prepared and carried out by the Ottoman government in 1915 as well as in the following years. As a result of the genocide, as many as 1.5 million Armenians who were living in their ancestral homeland (at that time it was a part of the Ottoman Empire) were deported and murdered.

A number of journalists, diplomats, soldiers, physicians, writers, and missionaries witnessed the Armenian genocide, with hundreds of these witnesses from various European countries (Germany, Austria, Italy) and the United States experiencing the events firsthand. These witnesses have provided testimonies that are highly valued by historians as reliable reports of the tragedy. The eyewitness accounts of non-Armenian diplomats, missionaries and others provide significant evidence about the events and particularly the systematic nature of the deportations and subsequent massacres.

== Overview ==
Among these, missionaries experienced the events first hand and were instrumental in spreading the news about the massacres worldwide. Some missionaries had also provided detailed information about the events to heads of state such as Woodrow Wilson. Many of the missionaries provided clandestine relief and oftentimes saved the lives of many Armenians.

Reacting to numerous eyewitness accounts, James Bryce and Arnold Toynbee compiled statements from survivors and eyewitnesses from other countries including Germany, Italy, the Netherlands, Sweden, and Switzerland, who similarly attested to the systematized massacring of innocent Armenians by Ottoman government forces. In 1916, they published The Treatment of Armenians in the Ottoman Empire, 1915–1916. Although the book has been criticized by Turkish denialists as propaganda to build up support for the war, Bryce had submitted the work to scholars for verification prior to its publication. University of Oxford Regius Professor Gilbert Murray stated of the time, "the evidence of these letters and reports will bear any scrutiny and overpower any skepticism. Their genuineness is established beyond question." Other professors, including Herbert Fisher of Sheffield University and former American Bar Association president Moorfield Storey, affirmed the same conclusion.

Other eyewitness accounts are from survivors of the Armenian genocide themselves. Today, there are only a "handful" of survivors alive. Many of these accounts were recorded on tape decades after the events. Hundreds of these testimonies and eyewitness accounts will be incorporated into the USC Shoah Foundation Institute for Visual History and Education as part of archival research project for the 100th anniversary of the Armenian genocide.

As asserted by Armenian historian Richard G. Hovannisian, "eyewitness accounts of decisive events may be as valuable as official dispatches and reports. It is in such version especially that the human element becomes manifest, affording insights not to be found in documents." Some survivor accounts have been turned into films such as Aurora Mardiganians' survivor story in the film Ravished Armenia.

In regards to the significance of eyewitness testimony, Genocide scholar Samuel Totten stated:

First-person accounts by victims and others are capable of breaking through the numbing mass of numbers in that they provide the thoughts, the passions and the voices of those who experienced and/or witnessed the terrible calamity now referred to as genocide. And while first-person accounts serve many purposes among the most significant is the fact that authentic accounts constitute valuable testimony as to what it means to be caught up in the maelstrom of hatred and savagery that is genocide.

The report of the US Ambassador to the Ottoman Empire Henry Morgenthau, Sr. is recognized to be one of the main eyewitness accounts of the genocide. Morgenthau published his memoirs about the Armenian massacres in a 1918 book Ambassador Morgenthau's Story. The book gives detailed documentation of the events and describes his appeals to stop the massacres.

Morgenthau's account and other books that provide testimonies to the events have been showcased around the world by the Armenian Genocide Museum-Institute of Yerevan, Armenia through temporary exhibitions.

== Notable witnesses and testimonies ==
=== Turkish ===
| Person | Occupation | Quotes, testimonies |
| Talat Pasha | Main perpetrator of the genocide Ottoman Minister of the Interior, 1913–18 Grand Vizier of the Ottoman Empire, 1917–18 | Interviewed by Berliner Tageblatt in May 1915, Talat stated: "We have been blamed for not making a distinction between guilty and innocent Armenians. [To do so] was impossible. Because of the nature of things, one who was still innocent today could be guilty tomorrow. The concern for the safety of Turkey simply had to silence all other concerns. Our actions were determined by national and historical necessity." Talat told German ambassador Johann von Bernstorff "What on earth do you want? The question is settled, there are no more Armenians." "It is no use for you to argue . . . we have already disposed of three quarters of the Armenians; there are none at all left in Bitlis, Van, and Erzeroum. The hatred between the Turks and the Armenians is now so intense that we have got to finish with them. If we don't, they will plan their revenge." On 3 August 1915, Talat met with US ambassador Morgenthau and told him "that our Armenian policy is absolutely fixed and that nothing can change it. We will not have the Armenians anywhere in Anatolia. They can live in the desert but nowhere else." |
| Mehmed Reshid | Governor of Diyarbekir Vilayet, genocide perpetrator | "Either the Armenians were to eliminate the Turks, or the Turks were to eliminate the Armenians. I did not hesitate when I was confronted with this dilemma. My Turkishness prevailed over my profession. I figured, instead of wiping us out, we will wipe them out....On the question how I, as a doctor, could have murdered, I can answer as follows: the Armenians had become hazardous microbes in the body of this country. Well, isn't it a doctor's duty to kill microbes?" |
| Mehmed Cavid Bey | CUP finance minister | "Ottoman history has never opened its pages, even during the time of the Middle Ages, onto such determined murder[s] and large scale cruelty." "If you want to bloody the Armenian question politically, then you scatter the people in the Armenian provinces, but scatter them in a humane manner. Hang the traitors, even if there are thousands of them. Who would entertain hiding Russians [and] the supporters of Russians? But stop right there. You dared to annihilate the existence of an entire nation, not [only] their political existence. You are both iniquitous and incapable. What kind of conscience must you have to [be able to] accept the drowning, in the mountains and next to lakes, of those women, children and the elderly who were taken to the countryside!" "With these acts we have [ruined] everything. We put an irremovable stain on the current administration."—Diary entry for 29 August–24 September 1915 |
| Mustafa Kemal Atatürk Turkish | First President of Turkey and Founder of the Republic of Turkey There is much debate as to whether Atatürk, at least partially, acknowledged the systematic nature of the massacres in 1915. According to David Gaunt and other historians, Kemal was "involved in completing genocide and ethnic cleansing in the years 1919 to 1924 [and] he used outright anti-Christian rhetoric to urge his cohorts to drive the last remaining Christians out". Historian Rouben Paul Adalian has argued that "Mustafa Kemal completed what Talaat and Enver had started in 1915". | See: Mustafa Kemal Atatürk's statements on the Armenian genocide |
| Faiz El-Ghusein Turkish/Arab | Sheikh and member of Ottoman parliament Faiz El-Ghusein was exiled to Diyarbakir under the suspicion of supporting the Arab Revolt. While in Diyarbakir, El-Ghusein witnessed the massacres of Armenians in and around the area. El-Ghusein wrote much of what he witnessed in his book Martyred Armenia which provides an eyewitness account of the massacres and exposes its systematic nature. The account was originally published in Arabic in 1916 under the title "Massacres in Armenia" but was changed to Martyred Armenia under its English translation. In the foreword of the book, El-Ghusein states, "The war must needs come to an end after a while, and it will then be plain to readers of this book that all I have written is the truth, and that it contains only a small part of the atrocities committed by the Turks against the hapless Armenian people." | Audio recording of Martyred Armenia by Fa'iz El-Ghusein "As to their preparations, the flags, bombs and the like, even assuming there to be some truth in the statement, it does not justify the annihilation of the whole people, men and women, old men and children, in a way which revolts all humanity and more especially Islam and the whole body of Moslems, as those unacquainted with the true facts might impute these deeds to Mohammedan fanaticism." "Annihilation seemed to be the sole means of deliverance; they found their opportunity in a time of war, and they proceeded to this atrocious deed, which they carried out with every circumstance of brutality — a deed which is contrary to the law of Islam." |
| Reshid Akif Pasha Turkish | Governor (Vali) of Sivas, Council of State, and cabinet minister in the Ottoman government Reşid Akif Paşa provided important testimony during a session of the Ottoman parliament on 21 November 1918. The speech had outlined the process in which official statements made use of vague terminology when ordering deportation only to be clarified by special orders ordering "massacres" sent directly from the Committee of Union and Progress headquarters and oftentimes the residence of Talat Pasha himself. | "During my few days of service in this government I've learned of a few secrets and have come across something interesting. The deportation order was issued through official channels by the minister of the interior and sent to the provinces. Following this order the [CUP] Central Committee circulated its own ominous order to all parties to allow the gangs to carry out their wretched task. Thus the gangs were in the field, ready for their atrocious slaughter." "The 'mission' in the circular was: to attack the convoys and massacre the population ... I am ashamed as a Muslim, I am ashamed as an Ottoman statesman. What a stain on the reputation of the Ottoman Empire, these criminal people ..." |
| Ahmed Rıza Turkish | Young Turk politician and President of the first Ottoman parliament Ahmed Rıza had opposed the Temporary Law of Deportation because he claimed the bill was unconstitutional since it was never voted on and was never approved by the Ottoman parliament. Rıza submitted a draft bill which called for the suspension of the deportations until after the war and proposed to provide security for the deportees. The bill, however, was never passed. Nevertheless, the arguments and issues exposed by Rıza showed that no member of parliament was informed about the deportation bill. Rıza expressed his objections to the Temporary Law on Abandoned Goods bill in a session in parliament on a 30 November 1915. | "It is unlawful to designate the Armenian assets as "abandoned goods" for the Armenians, the proprietors, did not abandon their properties voluntarily; they were forcibly, compulsorily removed from their domiciles and exiled. Now the government through its efforts is selling their goods ... Nobody can sell my property if I am unwilling to sell it. Article 21 of the Constitution forbids it. If we are a constitutional regime functioning in accordance with constitutional law we can't do this. This is atrocious. Grab my arm, eject me from my village, then sell my goods and properties, such a thing can never be permissible. Neither the conscience of the Ottomans nor the law can allow it." "Let's face it, we Turks savagely killed off the Armenians." In a statement in the Ottoman Parliament, Rize referred to the Special Organization as "murderers and criminals". |
| Abdülhalim Akkılıç Turkish | Colonel of cavalry | "There were no Armenians left in east, central Anatolia and to a certain degree in the western regions. If this cleaning had not been carried out, getting the independence struggle to succeed could have been much more difficult and could have cost us much more. May God be merciful and compassionate toward Enver and Talat Pashas who actualized this [cleaning]. Their foresight has saved the Turkish nation." |
| Mevlanzade Rifat Bey Kurdish | Journalist and poet | "The armed bands formed under the SO stained the [reputation of] the entire Turkish nation in the view of the world, causing the inclusion of bloody and barbarous pages in her history. It is not within the purview of justice and fairness to have the responsibility and consequences of these events placed squarely upon the shoulders of Anatolian Turks. Instead, the CUP leaders and especially...[Drs.] Bahaeddin Shakir, Nazım and [education minister] Şükrü who invented and administered this SO must be mentioned." |
| Musa Anter Kurdish | Kurdish writer and intellectual | In his memoir, Anter wrote that Şükrü Baban had once recounted the following story: "I [Baban] went to the part of the house reserved for males [selamlık], kissing the hands of my father and Talat Pasha. The pasha said: "Oh Şükrü, may God's grace be upon you, you have grown and become a man....And you have graduated as well, is that so?" "Yes, my Pasha," I replied. "Then, my son, from this day on, I appoint you the General Director of Settlements." Bewildered, I asked, "Uncle Pasha, who am I going to settle?" to which he laughed, replying, "My son, you are going to settle the Armenians." When I responded, "Okay, but aren't the Armenians (p.256) [already] settled; are they to become nomads instead? How can I do this job, I do not know," he laughed out loud, saying: "Şükrü, you went to Paris, but are still a child....My son, it is easy; you are going to give the command. When the Armenians in Erzurum come to Muş, they will be settled on the road; those of Van will be settled in Bitlis, the ones of Bitlis in Siirt, those of Diyarbekir in Urfa, the ones of Urfa in Mardin, and those in Mardin can be settled on the way to Musul." When I understood [the scope of] this pretend settlement on the road and the [ensuing] calamity, I turned white and could not utter a word. They immediately ordered me to leave." |
| Halide Edib Adıvar Turkish | Turkish novelist, nationalist, and feminist political leader In 1916–1917, Halide Edip acted as an inspector for schools in Damascus, Beirut, and Mount Lebanon. According to a teacher who worked briefly under her, Halide Edip "was at the head of an orphanage of 1,000 children in the mountains who were mostly Armenian children. She said, 'Their names are changed (to Moslem names) but they are children; they don't know what religion means. Now, they must be fed and clothed and kept safe.' She didn't say what would be afterwards." Halide Edip's account of her inspectorship emphasizes her humanitarian efforts and her struggles to come to terms with the violence of the situation. The account of one acquaintance, however, accuses her of "calmly planning with [Cemal Pasha] forms of human tortures for Armenian mothers and young women" and taking on "the task of making Turks of their orphaned children." A U.S. High Commissioner refers to her as a "chauvinist" and someone who is "trying to rehabilitate Turkey." | "We slaughtered the innocent Armenian population ... We tried to extinguish the Armenians through methods that belong to the medieval times". In a discussion with Djemal Pasha about Armenian children undergoing Turkification in Turkish orphanages: "Why do you allow Armenian children to be called by Moslem names? It looks like turning the Armenians into Moslems, and history some day will revenge it on the coming generation of Turks." "You are an idealist," [Cemal Pasha] answered gravely,"... Do you believe that by turning a few hundred Armenian boys and girls Moslem I think I benefit my race? You have seen the Armenian orphanages in Damascus run by Armenians. There is no room in those; there is no money to open another Armenian orphanage. This is a Moslem orphanage, and only Moslem orphans are allowed. When I hear of wandering and starving children, I sent them to Aintoura. I have to keep them alive. I do not care how. I cannot bear to see them die in the streets." "Afterward?" I asked. "Do you mean after the war?" he asked. "After the war they will go back to their people. I hope none is too small to realize his race." "I will never have anything to do with such an orphanage." He shook his head. "You will," he said; "if you see them in misery and suffering, you will go to them and not think for a moment about their names and religion ..." |
| Abdülmecid II Turkish | Last Caliph of Islam of the Ottoman Dynasty, 1922–1924 Abdülmecid II was the last Caliph of Islam from the Ottoman Dynasty and Heir-Apparent to the Ottoman Throne. He is often noted for his intervention and confrontation with Enver Pasha before the latter's support of initiating the deportations and subsequent massacres. In an interview with an Istanbul Special Correspondent of a newspaper based in London, Abdülmecid II describes the encounter. | "I refer to those awful massacres. They are the greatest stain that has ever disgraced our nation and race. They were entirely the work of Talat and Enver. I heard some days before they began that they were intended. I went to Istanbul and insisted on seeing Enver. I asked him if it was true that they intended to recommence the massacres which had been our shame and disgrace under Abdul Hamid. The only reply I could get from him was: 'It is decided. It is the program.'" |
| Mehmet Celal Bey Turkish | Governor of Aleppo and Konya Because he refused orders to deport Armenians, Celal Bey was removed from his post as governor of Aleppo and transferred to Konya. As deportations continued, he repeatedly demanded from the central authorities that shelter be provided for the deportees. In addition to these demands, Celal Bey sent many telegraphs and letters of protest to the Sublime Porte stating that the "measures taken against the Armenians were, from every point of view, contrary to the higher interests of the fatherland." His demands, however, were ignored. Mehmet Celal Bey compared himself to "a person sitting by the side of a river, with absolute no means of saving anyone. Blood was flowing in the river and thousands of innocent children, irreproachable old people, helpless women, strong young men, were streaming down this river towards oblivion. Anyone I could save with my bare hands I saved, and the others, I think they streamed down the river never to return." | Mehmet Celal Bey at first did not believe that the deportations were meant to "annihilate" the Armenians: "I admit, I did not believe that these orders, these actions revolved around the annihilation of the Armenians. I never imagined that any government could take upon itself to annihilate its own citizens in this manner, in effect destroying its human capital, which must be seen as the country's greatest treasure. I presumed that the actions being carried out were measures deriving from a desire to temporarily remove the Armenians from the theater of war and taken as the result of wartime exigencies." "... but why were the Armenians of Bursa, Edirne, and Tekirdag removed? Was this part of the Sakarya basin as well? Why were they sent to Aleppo, a place whose population was only one-twentieth Armenian? Right or wrong, for the sake of the fatherland the Armenians were removed from their lands, how is this a practical policy? Has the government even thought about the implications of deporting these helpless Armenians without food or shelter to Der Zor where Arab nomadic tribes solely reside? If so I ask: how much food was provided and how many shelters were built for these deportees? What is the purpose of deporting the Armenians, who have lived for centuries on these lands, to the deserts of Der Zor without water and lumber to construct their new settlements? Unfortunately, it is impossible to deny and distort the facts. The purpose was to annihilate [imhaydı] and they were annihilated [imha edildiler]. It is impossible to hide and conceal this policy conducted by the İttihat and Terakki which was drafted by its leaders and was ultimately accepted by the general public." |
| Mustafa Arif Deymer Turkish | Interior Minister of the Ottoman Empire, 1917–1918 Mustafa Arif (since Surname Law Mustafa Arif Deymer) served as Interior Minister succeeding Talat Pasha after the latter had stepped down from office. In regards to the massacres, Arif was especially known for establishing a governmental commission that examined the events. On 18 March 1919, the commission concluded that 800,000 Armenians died during World War I. The figure became reputable after other Turkish historians such as Yusuf Hikmet Bayur used the figure in their research and writing. | "Surely a few Armenians aided and abetted our enemy, and a few Armenian Deputies committed crimes against the Turkish nation ... it is incumbent upon a government to pursue the guilty ones. Unfortunately, our wartime leaders, imbued with a spirit of brigandage, carried out the law of deportation in a manner that could surpass the proclivities of the most bloodthirsty bandits. They decided to exterminate the Armenians, and they did exterminate them." "The atrocities committed against the Armenians reduced our country to a gigantic slaughterhouse." |
| Mustafa Yamulki Kurdish | Ottoman military officer and head judge of the Turkish Courts-Martial of 1919–1920 Also known as "Nemrud" Mustafa Pasha, Mustafa Yamulki was the head judge of the Turkish Courts-Martial of 1919–1920 since the day of its creation in February 1919. The Courts-Martial's was later known for condemning Talat, Enver, Cemal, and others to death for their role in the massacres against Armenians. "Nemrud" Mustafa Pasha had a reputation for being honest and was instrumental in exposing the crimes and corruption scandals of the Ottoman Empire during World War I. Due to his open accusations against the massacres, "Nemrud" Mustafa Pasha was sentenced to three months imprisonment. The sentences he gave condemning various Turkish officials for conducting massacre were overturned. | "Our fellow countrymen committed unheard of crimes, resorted to all conceivable methods of despotism, organised deportations and massacres, poured gas over babies and burned them, raped women and girls in front of their parents who were bound hand and foot, took girls in front of their parents and fathers, appropriated personal property and real estate, drove people to Mesopotamia and treated them inhumanly on the way ... they put thousands of innocent people into boats that were sunk at sea ... they put Armenians in the most unbearable conditions any other nation had ever known in its history." |
| Wehib Pasha Turkish | General in the Ottoman Army and commander of the Ottoman Third Army during the Caucasus Campaign Vehip Pasha assumed the commandment of the Third Army in February 1916 from Mahmud Kâmil Pasha, after much of the deportations concluded. During his post, Vehip Pasha received an order to send 2,000 Armenians as labor battalions for the construction of the Baghdad-Berlin Railway. However, Vehip Pasha was "outraged" after receiving word that the Armenians he had sent were massacred. Vehip Pasha set up a court-martial for the men in charge of the transfer and massacre, Kör Nuri and Çerkez Kadir, who were later hanged on Vehip's orders. During the court-martial, Nuri blamed the governor of Sivas, Ahmet Muammer, for the massacres. Ahmet Muammer was eventually relieved by Talat Pasha who subsequently positioned him outside of Vehip Pasha's supervision. Though Vehip Pasha is largely known for his commandment during the Caucasus Campaign in 1918, he also condemned the massacres against Armenians that happened prior to his appointment as commander of the Third Army in 1916. | "The massacre and destruction of the Armenians and the plunder and pillage of their goods were the results of decision reached by Ittihad's [the Young Turks] Central Committee ... The atrocities were carried out under a program that was determined upon and involved a definite case of premeditation. It was [also] ascertained that these atrocities and crimes were encouraged by the district attorneys whose dereliction of judicial duties in face of their occurrence and especially their remaining indifferent renders them accessories to these crimes." "In summary, here are my convictions. The Armenian deportations were carried out in a manner entirely unbecoming to humanity, civilization, and government. The massacre and annihilation of the Armenians, and the looting and plunder of their properties were the result of the decision of the Central Committee of Ittihad and Terakki. The butchers of human beings, who operated in the command zone of the Third Army, were procured and engaged by Dr. Bahattin Şakir. The high ranking governmental officials did submit to his directives and order ... He stopped by at all major centers where he orally transmitted his instructions to the party's local bodies and to the governmental authorities." |
| Ahmet Refik Turkish | Turkish historian, poet, and writer After World War I, Ahmet Refik wrote Two committees two massacres (İki Komite iki Kitâl), an account of the massacres during the War. Though Refik writes about massacres conducted on both sides, he concludes that the massacres against the Armenians was an attempt by the Turkish government to "destroy the Armenians". | "The criminal gangs who were released from the prisons, after a week's training at the War Ministry's training grounds, were sent off to the Caucasian front as the brigands of the Special Organization, perpetrating the worst crimes against the Armenians." "In a situation such as this, a just government which is confident of its force would have punished those who rebelled against the government. But the Ittihadists, wanted to annihilate the Armenians and in this manner eliminate the Eastern Question." "It was said that the most distressing tragedies occurred in Bursa and Ankara; houses were ransacked, hundreds of Armenian families were put into cars and hurled into streams. Many women went insane in the face of such awful murders. Houses of wealthy Armenians were bought, but the payments were recovered by fiat upon transfer of title. This conduct was a murder against humanity. No government, in any age, had brought about a murder this cruel." |
| Hasan Tahsin Turkish | Governor of Erzurum Formerly the Vali of Van, Hasan Tahsin was appointed Governor of Erzurum in late 1914. On 2 August 1919, during the Mamuretulaziz trial, Tahsin testified that the Teskilat-ı Mahsusa, under the command of Bahaeddin Sakir, was mobilized to kill Armenians. According to his testimony, when orders of deportation and massacre were made by the Interior Ministry, Tahsin protested by saying the Armenians were blameless and that the local Armenian population was not staging a rebellion. He also pointed out that the Van rebellion would not have occurred if the Ottoman government did not provoke the Armenians. Having failed to put a stop to the deportations, Tahsin nevertheless attempted to ensure the safety of the deportees within his jurisdiction. However, despite his attempts, many convoys were "destroyed" in the outskirts of the city. | "During the deportation of the Armenians I was in Erzurum ... The caravans which were subject to attacks and killings resulted from the actions of those who'd assembled under the name "Tes-ı Mahsusa." The Teskilat-ı Mahsusa was composed of two units. When I came back from Erzurum, the Teskilat-ı Mahsusa had turned into a major power and they'd become involved in the war. The Army knew about it. Then there was another Teskilat-ı Mahsusa, and that one had Bahaeddin Sakir's signature on it. In other words, he was sending telegrams around as the head of the Teskilat-ı Mahsusa...Bahaeddin Sakir had a code. He'd communicate with the Sublime Porte and with the Ministry of the Interior with it. During the deportation he communicated with the Army as well Bahaeddin Sakir had two different codes with which to communicate with both the Sublime Porte and the Ministry of War." |
| Huseyin Nesimi Bey Turkish | Mayor of Lice Huseyin Nesimi Bey was the mayor of Lice, a town not far from Diyarbakir. At the time of his governance, the governor of Diyarbakir, Mehmed Reshid, was conducting deportations and massacres towards the Armenians in the area. Having known that the deportations meant massacre, Huseyin Nesimi refused to have the Armenians of Lice deported. Due to his refusal of proceeding with the deportations, Nesimi Bey was murdered. When news reached the interior ministry about the assassination of Nesimi Bey, Reshid had claimed that Armenian militants had killed him. However, Nesimi Bey's son, Abidin Nesimi, wrote in his memoirs decades later that his father was murdered because he refused to deport the Armenians of the village. With Nesimi Bey dead, the massacre of the Armenians of Lice resumed, resulting in the deaths of thousands. | When orders of deportations reached Nesimi, it is reported that he said: "I don't want to participate in this sin!" Huseyin Nesimi's son, Abidin Nesimi, wrote in his memoirs: "During the governorship of Dr Reshid, many crimes were committed whose agents could not be found. The most important of these are the murders of Governor of Basra Ferit, Governor of the Province Muntefek Bedi Nuri, Lieutenant Governor of Lice, my father Huseyin Nesimı, Representative Lieutenant Governor of Besiri, Sabit and journalist Ismail Mestan. All these people killed were either socialists or philanthropists. It was impossible to carry out the Armenian deportations with the Circassian gendarme team and members of Bedirhani, Millı, Karakecili tribes who were actually Kurdish militia, because these groups were interested in plunder and pillage. Unable to realize deportations they transformed them into massacres. Hence the elimination of the administrative staff who would oppose this plunder and pillage was also inevitable. Therefore, this cadre deemed the elimination of the above-mentioned persons necessary, too." |
| Hasan Fehmi (Ataç) Turkish | Deputy of the Turkish National Assembly and Minister of Agriculture and of Finance of the Republic of Turkey During the early years of the Republic of Turkey, secret sessions of the National Assembly took place which discussed the governments role during World War I. Mustafa Kemal Atatürk, the first president of the Republic of Turkey, presided over the secret sessions. The sessions also touched upon the massacres of Armenians and the situation of their "abandoned" property. Hasan Fehmi (Ataç), a deputy representing Gümüşhane, openly testified the motives of the government and the nature of the massacres during one such session. Fehmi (Ataç) also proclaimed that the confiscation of property was only done to Christian minorities. | "As you know the [Armenian] deportations were an event that triggered a worldwide outcry and caused us to be regarded as murderers. Before embarking upon it we knew that the Christian world would not indulge us and would direct its full wrath and deep-seated enmity against us on account of it. Why have we then [opted for] appending to ourselves the label of murderers (Neden katillik unvanini nefsimize izafe ettik)? Why have we involved ourselves in such a grave and difficult conflict? We acted thusly simply to ensure the future of our fatherland that we consider to be dearer and more sacred to us than our own lives." When referring to the confiscated Armenian properties and assets, Fehmi (Ataç) stated: "Not a single Muslim's good were liquidated, you can establish these facts by examining the old records of the secret deliberations. The Parliament at that time secretly secured reassurances from the Finance Minister that the law would not apply to Muslims who had fled as a result of war. Only after registering this assurance did we proclaim to the world that law. Presently, we are repeating that procedure." |
| Halil Kut Turkish | Ottoman regional governor and military commander Halil Kut was the uncle of Enver Pasha, one of the "masterminds" of the Armenian genocide. Kut had conducted "the massacre" of Armenian battalions as stated by the German Vice-consul of Erzurum and later testified by a soldier who had been under his command by saying, "Halil had the entire Armenian population (men, women and children) in the areas of Bitlis, Mus, and Beyazit also massacred without pity. My company received a similar order. Many of the victims were buried alive in especially prepared ditches." Others, such as German vice-consul of Erzurum Max Erwin von Scheubner-Richter, reported that "Halil Bey's campaign in northern Persia included the massacre of his Armenian and Syrian battalions and the expulsion of the Armenian, Syrian, and Persian population out of Persia ..." | Halil Kut wrote in his memoirs having killed: "300,000 Armenians, it can be more or less. I didn't count." In the summer of 1918, in front of many Armenians in Yerevan, Halil Kut declared: "I have endeavored to wipe out the Armenian nation to the last individual." "I will not leave even one Armenian on the surface of the earth!" |
| Ali Kemal Turkish | Minister of Education, March – May 1919; Interior Minister, May – June 1919 Ali Kemal Bey was a liberal Ottoman journalist, newspaper editor and poet who was also a Minister of the Interior and Minister of Education under the government of Damat Ferid Pasha, Grand Vizier of the Ottoman Empire. Ali Kemal condemned the massacres of the Armenians and demanded prosecution and punishment of their perpetrators. Ali Kemal Bey was also an editor of various newspapers including the Turkish dailies Sabah, Alemdar, Peyam, and later Peyam-Sabah, openly blamed not only the Ittihadist leaders, but also the Ottoman Chamber of Deputies and "thousands and thousands" of ordinary people participating in the massacres. | In an 18 July 1919 issue of the Alemdar newspaper, Ali Kemal Bey wrote: "... our Minister of Justice has opened the doors of prisons. Don't let us try to throw the blame on the Armenians; we must not flatter ourselves that the world is filled with idiots. We have plundered the possessions of the men whom we deported and massacred; we have sanctioned theft in our Chamber and our Senate. Let us prove that we have sufficient national energy to put the law into force against the heads of these bands who have trampled justice underfoot and dragged our honor and our national life through the dust." In a 28 January 1919 issue of the Sabah newspaper, Kemal Bey wrote: "Four or five years ago a historically singular crime has been perpetrated, a crime before which the world shudders. Given its dimensions and standards, its authors do not number in the fives, or tens, but in the hundreds of thousands. In fact, it has already been demonstrated that this tragedy was planned on the basis of a decision reached by the Central Committee of Ittihad." |
| Damat Ferid Pasha Turkish | Grand Vizier of the Ottoman Empire; March 1919 – October 1919, April 1920 – October 1920 Damat Ferid Pasha was a prominent Ottoman statesman who became a Grand Vizier twice during the reign of Sultan Mehmed VI Vahdeddin (1918–1922). It was under his administration that the Court Martial was held which ultimately sentenced those involved with the systematic massacres to death. | "In the course of the war nearly the whole civilised world was shocked by the recital of the crimes alleged to have been committed by the Turks. It is far from my thought to cast a veil over these misdeeds, which are such as to make the conscience of mankind shudder with horror for ever; still less will I endeavour to minimise the degree of guilt of the actors in the great drama. The aim which I have set myself is that of showing to the world with proofs in my hand, who are the truly responsible authors of these terrible crimes." |
| Hasan Mazhar; Turkish | Governor of Ankara Hasan Mazhar Bey, who was appointed Vali of Ankara on 18 June 1914, is known for having refused to proceed with the order of deportations. Upon refusal, Mazhar Bey was removed from his post as governor in August 1915 and was replaced with Atif Bey, a prominent member of the Teşkîlât-ı Mahsûsa (Special Organization), a militant organization utilized to murder Armenians. After leaving his post, Mazhar went on to report that "in the kaza [district], the plunder of Armenian property, by both officials and the population, assumed incredible proportions." Above all, Mazhar became the key figure in the establishment of the "Mazhar Inquiry Commission", an investigative committee which immediately took up the task of gathering evidence and testimonies, with a special effort to obtain inquiries on civil servants implicated in massacres committed against Armenians. | "When I received orders from the Ministry of the Interior regarding the deportation of Armenians I pretended not to understand. As you know, other provinces were done with the deportations before I had ever started. Then one day Atif Bey came to me and orally conveyed the interior minister's orders that the Armenians were to be murdered during the deportation. "No, Atif Bey," I said, "I am a governor, not a bandit, I cannot do this, I will leave this post and you can come and do it."" |
| Süleyman Nazif Turkish | Turkish poet and Governor of Baghdad Süleyman Nazif was the Vali of Baghdad during the Armenian genocide and was instrumental in preventing massacres from occurring in the province. In one instance, Nazif had intercepted a convoy of deportees numbering 260 Armenian women and children who were being sent to their deaths. Nazif demanded that the convoy be transferred to a safer zone in Mosul but his proposal was refused. The convoy was eventually massacred. During his time as governor of Baghdad, Nazif visited Diyarbakir where he encountered a "pungent smell of decaying corpses" which "pervaded the atmosphere and that the bitter stench clogged his nose, making him gag." Nazif was critical of Dr. Mehmed Reshid, the governor of Diyarbakir, who was known as the "Butcher of Diyarbakir". Nazif, who stated that Reshid "destroyed through massacre thousands of humans" also wrote about a committee established by Reshid with the objective of providing a 'solution of the Armenian question'. The committee had its own military unit and was called the 'Committee of Inquiry'. Nazif also encouraged other governors not to proceed with the deportation order. In a letter written to his brother Faik Ali Bey, the governor of Kutahya, Nazif wrote, "Don't participate in this event, watch out for our family's honor." | In a testimony to the Interior Ministry, Nazif stated, "the catastrophic deportations and murders in Diyarbakir were Reshid's work. He alone is responsible. He killed the kaymakams in order to scare all other opposition Muslim men and women-he displayed the corpses of the kaymakams in public." In a 28 November 1918 issue of the Hadisat newspaper, Nazif wrote: "Under the guise of deportations, mass murder was perpetrated. Given the fact that the crime is all too evident, the perpetrators should have been hanged already." When Talat Pasha condemned Reshid for robbery, Nazif wrote, "Talat Pasha dismissed Resit as a thief, while he adored him as murderer". |
| Faik Ali Ozansoy Turkish | Turkish Poet and Governor of Kutahya Faik Ali Ozansoy is especially known for having saved the lives of thousands of Armenians during the Armenian genocide. During the Armenian genocide, Ozansoy served as governor of the Kütahya Province. When orders of deportations reached Ozansoy, he refused to carry them out. His brother, Suleyman Nazif, insisted in a letter that he not "participate in this event, watch out for our family's honor." Meanwhile, while many Armenians were being deported through Kutahya and onto further destinations, Ozansoy protected them and provided shelter. He was then invited by Talat Pasha to Istanbul to explain his actions towards the Armenians. While Ozansoy was in the capital negotiating with Talaat, the chief of police in Kutahya, Kemal Bey, took advantage of Ozansoy's absence and forced many Armenians in the province to convert to Islam. Consequently, many did convert so as to save themselves from deportation. Upon returning to Kutahya, Ozansoy was upset over the mass conversions. He immediately removed Kemal Bey from his post and reassessed the situation by asking the Armenians of Kutahya whether they wished to remain Muslim. All, with the exception of one, decided to stay Christian. Due to protecting the life of Armenian Christians, Ozansoy was known as the "governor of the infidels" by his contemporaries. On 24 April 2013, the day of remembrance for the Armenian genocide, various prominent figures of both the Armenian and Turkish community visited his grave to pay their respects. | Ali Faik's encounter with Talat Pasha is described by Armenian writer Stepan Stepanyan, who was informed about the details of their meeting from Ali Faik himself. The following is Stepanyan's transcript of the conversation as described by Ali Faik: Talaat asks him why he hasn't deported the Armenians of his town. He answers that the Armenians of his sandjak have always been faithful Ottomans and that they have always lived with the Turks like brothers. Talaat points out that the decision for deportations is for all Armenians and there can be no exception to this rule. "In that case, since I don't want to be a murderer, please accept my resignation and find a successor who is willing to implement such a policy" says Ali Faik Bey. Only then Talaat says, "Fine, fine. Take your Armenians and just sit in your place." |
| Kemal Midhat Bey Turkish | Grandson of Midhat Pasha and prominent member of the Young Turk party Kemal Midhat Bey was the grandson of prominent reformer Midhat Pasha. He was a member of the Young Turk party and was an instrumental figure during the 1908 revolution and its subsequent government. Kemal Midhat Bey openly declared that "the Armenians are the most faithful and loyal citizens of the Ottoman Empire" and then stated that the Armenians "have in no wise deserved the inhuman and bloody measures applied to them by the Young Turks of the present government." His full length testimony of the massacres was first published in the Journal de Genève on 1 January 1918. | "To you, Armenians, faithful citizens, local and useful to the Empire, Turkey is indebted for the eminent services that you rendered to it as well for its economic and commercial development as intellectual and artistic. At this hour, a band of adventurers calling themselves "Young Turks" hold the power in Constantinople and, in order to hold on to it, they have recourse daily to the most sanguinary means which were never seen, even under the reign of Abdul Hamid! And we were impotent witnesses of this coward extermination of our Armenian brothers that these gangsters have deported and massacred by the hundreds of thousands. To justify these crimes, the current Government of Turkey has published more than one booklet cynically untrue against the Armenians. After having slaughtered the women and children, it was necessary to invent all kinds of accusations against the unfortunate Armenian people..." |
| Hafız Mehmet Turkish | Trabzon Deputy and Justice Minister in the Republic of Turkey A lawyer by profession, Hafız Mehmet stated that he and other local politicians in Trabzon had known about the systematic massacres against the Armenians. He stated that the policy was conducted mainly through the Special Organization. Hafız Mehmet repeatedly protested the decision of the local government and particularly Vali Cemal Azmi's decision of drowning Armenians in the Black Sea in and around Trabzon as part of the Armenian genocide. Mehmet protested to Interior Minister Talat Pasha, but was unsuccessful in bringing the drownings and massacres to an end. | "God will punish us for what we did [Allah bize belasını verecektir] ... the matter is too obvious to be denied. I personally witnessed this Armenian occurrence in the port city of Ordu [about 155 km west of Trabzon]. Under the pretext of sending off to Samsun, another port city on the Black Sea [about 255 km west of Trabzon], the district's governor loaded the Armenians into barges and had them thrown overboard. I have heard that the governor-general applied this procedure [throughout the province]. Even though I reported this at the Interior Ministry immediately upon my return to Istanbul ... I was unable to initiate any action against the latter; I tried for some three years to get such action instituted but in vain." |
| Şerif Pasha Kurdish | Ottoman statesman and Ambassador to Sweden Mehmed Şerif Pasha was the brother-in-law of Prime Minister Said Halim Pasha and was a prominent member of the Young Turk government. In a New York Times article dated 10 October 1915, Şerif Pasha condemned the massacres and declared that the Young Turk government had the intentions of "exterminating" the Armenians for a long time. | "To be sure, the state of mind of the Unionists was not revealed to the civilized world until they had openly taken sides with Germany; but for more than six years I have been at exposing them in the Mecheroutiette (his newspaper, published first in Constantinople and then in Paris) and indifferent journals and reviews, warning France and England of the plot against them and against certain nationalities within the Ottoman borders, notably the Armenians, that was being hatched." "Alas! at the thought that a people so gifted, which has served as the fructifying soil for the renovation of the Ottoman Empire, is on the point of disappearing from history-not enslaved, as were the Jews by the Assyrians, but annihilated-even the most hardened heart must bleed: and I desire, through the medium of your estimable journal, to express to this race which is being assassinated, my anger toward the butchers and my immense pity for the victim's." |

=== German ===
| Person | Occupation | Quotes, testimonies |
| Hans Freiherr von Wangenheim German | German Ambassador to the Ottoman Empire, 1912–1915 During the deportations and as World War I was going on, all of the diplomats representing Allied powers were expelled from the country. Due to the German-Turkish alliance, Germans along with Austrians remained. While major newspapers were talking about the massacres, Wangenheim was at first reluctant to talk about the massacres, but he eventually conceded by saying that there "no longer was doubt that the Porte was trying to exterminate the Armenian race in the Turkish Empire." While Wangenheim did not go further in his formal testimony against the massacres, his successors and others in the German diplomatic staff reacted more strongly. | "On the other hand, the German Government cannot disguise the dangers created by these rigorous measures and notably by the mass expatriations which include the guilty and the innocent indiscriminately, especially when these measures are accompanied by acts of violence, such as massacre and pillage." "The manner in which the matter of relocation is being handled demonstrate that the government is in fact pursuing the goal of annihilating the Armenian race in Turkey." |
| Paul Wolff-Metternich German | German Ambassador to the Ottoman Empire, 1915–1916 Unlike most of his companions in the German consulate, Metternich openly condemned the Turkish and German governments for collaborating and conspiring against the Armenians. He was particularly bothered by the German media which he accused of encouraging the ongoing measures against Armenians. He was quoted as saying, "Their successes are due to our work, to our officers, to our cannons and to our money. Without our help, the inflated frog is bound to collapse". Metternich was among the few German diplomats in the Ottoman Empire who openly held Talat Pasha responsible for the massacres, accusing him of being "the soul of the Armenian persecutions." | "In its attempt to carry out its purpose to resolve the Armenian question by the destruction of the Armenian race, the Turkish government has refused to be deterred neither by our representations, nor by those of the American Embassy, nor by the delegate of the Pope, nor by the threats of the Allied Powers, nor in deference to the public opinion of the West representing one-half of the world." "In the implementation of its scheme to settle the Armenian Question through annihilation of the Armenian race, the Turkish government did not allow itself to be distracted". "Nobody has anymore the power to restrain the multi-headed hydra of the [CUP] Committee, and the attendant chauvinism and fanaticism. The committee demands the extirpation of the last remnants of the Armenians, and the government must yield." "The anti-Armenian atrocities will at long sight press down on the Turkish name" |
| Richard von Kühlmann German | German Ambassador to the Ottoman Empire, 1916–1917 Like his predecessor Hans Freiherr von Wangenheim, Kühlmann was initially reluctant to expose the massacres against the Armenian population. Kühlmann, who held sympathetic beliefs toward Turkish nationalism, repeatedly used the term "alleged" and excused the Turkish government for the massacres. Kühlmann, in defense of the Turkish government and the German-Turkish World War alliance, stated that the policies against the Armenians was a matter of "internal politics". However, Kühlmann eventually conceded in calling the massacres "a large scale destruction of Armenians." | "The destruction of the Armenians was undertaken on a massive scale. This policy of extermination will for a long time stain the name of Turkey." |
| Friedrich Freiherr Kress von Kressenstein German | German General and head of Ottoman army operations in the Caucasus Kressenstein was the chief of staff in Syria and Palestine during World War I. During his time in the region, he reported that the policy implemented towards the Armenians by the Turkish government as a "military necessity" was in actuality a policy to "justify the murder of hundreds and thousands of human beings." Kressenstein was also known in his reports for scorning the misinformation by Turkish authorities in regards to the situation of the Armenians. He also noted that the refusal of providing aid to the Armenian refugees was "proof" in itself that the Turkish authorities had the "resolve to destroy the Armenians." | "The Turkish policy of causing starvation is an all too obvious proof for the Turkish resolve to destroy the Armenians." "The Turkish policy vis a vis the Armenians is clearly outlined [zeichnet sich klar ab]. The Turks have by no means relinquished their intention to exterminate the Armenians [ihre Absicht...auszurotten]. They merely changed their tactic. Wherever possible, the Armenians are being aroused, provoked in the hope of thereby securing a pretext for new assaults on them." |
| Johannes Mordtmann; German | Armenian expert at the German embassy in Constantinople | "Talat Bey . . . explained without hesitation that the government wished to use the World War as a pretext [so as not to allow foreign countries to intervene] in order to cleanse the country of its internal enemies—meaning the Christians of all denominations." — Note attached to a report by Walter Rössler, German consul in Aleppo |
| Martin Niepage German | German schoolteacher in Aleppo Martin Niepage was a teacher of the German Realschule in Aleppo from 1913 to 1916. Niepage had tried to stop the massacres from happening by appealing to the local German authorities in order "to put a stop to the brutality with which the wives and children of slaughtered Armenians are being treated here". He also indicated that the campaign of forceful starvation was just one of the methods employed to annihilate the Armenians all together. Martin Niepage wrote an account of his experiences in Aleppo entitled The Horrors of Aleppo. Niepage was later sentenced to death in absentia by the Turkish government for publishing the account. | "A newspaper reporter was told by one of these gentlemen "Certainly we are now punishing many innocent people as well. But we have to guard ourselves even against those who may one day become guilty." On such grounds Turkish statesmen justify the wholesale slaughter of defenceless women and children. A German Catholic ecclesiastic reported that Enver Pasha declared, in the presence of Monsignore Dolci, the Papal Envoy at Constantinople, that he would not rest so long as a single Armenian remained alive. The object of the deportations is the extermination of the whole Armenian nation." "I was told, to cover the extermination of the Armenian nation with a political cloak, military reasons were being put forward ... After I had informed myself about the facts and had made enquiries on all sides, I came to the conclusion that all these accusations against the Armenians were, in fact, based on trifling provocations, which were taken as an excuse for slaughtering 10,000 innocents for one guilty person, for the most savage outrages against women and children, and for a campaign of starvation against the exiles which was intended to exterminate the whole nation." "The German Consul from Mosul related, in my presence, at the German club at Aleppo that, in many places on the road from Mosul to Aleppo, he had seen children's hands lying hacked off in such numbers that one could have paved the road with them." "When I returned to Aleppo in September, 1915, from a three months' holiday at Beirout, I heard with horror that a new phase of Armenian massacres had begun which were far more terrible than the earlier massacres under Abdul-Hamid, and which aimed at exterminating, root and branch, the intelligent, industrious, and progressive Armenian nation, and at transferring its property to Turkish hands." |
| Armin T. Wegner German | Soldier, medic, and photographer Armin Wegner was a German soldier and medic in World War I, a prolific author, and a human rights activist. Stationed in the Ottoman Empire during World War I, Wegner was a witness to the Armenian genocide and the photographs he took documenting the plight of the Armenians today "comprises the core of witness images of the Genocide." He enrolled as a medic at the outbreak of World War I during the winter of 1914–5, and was awarded the Iron Cross for assisting wounded under fire. He rose to the rank of second lieutenant in the German Sanitary Corps, which was attached to the Ottoman Sixth Army. Wegner was part of a German detachment led by Colmar Freiherr von der Goltz, which was stationed along the Baghdad Railway in Syria and Mesopotamia; here, Wegner witnessed the death marches of Armenians during the height of the Armenian genocide. Disobeying orders intended to smother news of the massacres (as the Ottoman Empire and Germany were allies), he gathered information on the massacres, collected documents, annotations, notes, and letters and took hundreds of photographs in the Armenian deportation camps in Deir ez-Zor, which later served to evidence the extent of the atrocities to which the Ottoman Armenians were subjected. At the Ottoman command's request, Wegner was eventually arrested by the Germans and recalled to Germany. While some of his photographs were confiscated and destroyed, he nonetheless succeeded in smuggling out many images of the Armenian persecution by hiding the negatives in his belt. Wegner protested against the atrocities perpetrated by the Ottoman government against the Armenian people in an open letter, published in the Berliner Tageblatt, submitted to American President Woodrow Wilson at the peace conference of 1919. The letter made a case for the creation of an independent Armenian state. Also in 1919, Wegner published Der Weg ohne Heimkehr (The Road of No Return), a collection of letters he had written during what he deemed the "martyrdom" (Martyrium) of the Anatolian Armenians. | "As one of the few Europeans who have been eyewitness of the dreadful destruction of the Armenian people from its beginning in the fruitful fields of Anatolia up to the wiping out of the mournful remnants of the race on the banks of the Euphrates, I venture to claim the right of setting before you these pictures of misery and terror which passed before my eyes during nearly two years, and which will never be obliterated from my mind. When the Turkish Government, in the Spring of 1915, set about the execution of its monstrous project of exterminating the Armenians, all the nations of Europe were unhappily bleeding to exhaustion, owing to the tragic blindness of their mutual misunderstandings, and there was no one to hinder the lurid tyrants of Turkey from carrying onto the bitter end those revolting atrocities which can only be likened to the acts of a criminal lunatic... "...Here they died-slain by Kurds, robbed by gendarmes, shot, hanged, poisoned, stabbed, strangled, mowed down by epidemics, drowned, frozen, parched with thirst, starved-their bodies left to putrefy or to be devoured by jackals. Children wept themselves to death, men dashed themselves against the rocks, mothers threw their babies into the brooks, women with child flung themselves, singing into the Euphrates. They died all the deaths on the earth, the deaths of all the ages... "Everyone who knows the events of this war in Anatolia, who has followed the fortunes of this nation with open eyes, know that all those accusations which were brought, with great cunning and much diligence, against the Armenian race, are nothing but loathsome slanders fabricated by their unscrupulous tyrants, in order to shield themselves from the consequences of their own mad and brutal acts, and to hide their own incapacity for reconciliation with the spirit of sincerity and humanity." |
| Johann von Bernstorff German | German Ambassador to the Ottoman Empire, 1917–1918 Like the rest of the German diplomats who served in the Ottoman Empire during World War I, Johann von Bernstorff, who at the time was the German ambassador to the United States in 1915, attempted to conceal the massacres by saying that they were mere "allegations" and "inventions". However, when he assumed his position as ambassador to the Ottoman Empire in 1917, Bernstorff conceded in believing that the policy against the Armenians was that of exterminating the race. Bernstorff provided a detailed account of the massacres in his memoirs entitled, Memoirs of Count Bernstorff. In his memoirs, Bernstorff describes his discussion with Talat Pasha after much of the massacres concluded and wrote that Talat Pasha said, "What on earth do you want? The question is settled, there are no more Armenians." | In his conversation with Talat Pasha: "When I kept on pestering him about the Armenian question, he once said with a smile: 'What on earth do you want? The question is settled, there are no more Armenians'" "In Armenia the Turks had been systematically trying to exterminate the Christian population." |
| Prince Ernst Hohenlohe-Langenburg German | German Ambassador to the Ottoman Empire, 20 July – 2 October 1915 Ernst Hohenlohe-Langenburg served on a temporary basis as ambassador but was equally distressed over the massacres, much like his counterpart Metternich. Hohenlohe-Langenburg encouraged the German government to disassociate themselves from the Ottoman government and its policies of "extermination" against the Armenians. He also encouraged the German diplomatic staff to voice their opposition against the massacres and condemn them. | "The systematic butchery of the uprooted and deported Armenians have assumed such a scope ... it was not only tolerated but openly promoted by the government. It meant the extermination of the Armenians. Despite government assurances to the contrary, everything points to the goal of the destruction of the Armenian people." "Turkey wants to annex the Caucasus entirely and exterminate the Armenians (ausrouen) with all means available; massacres and bloodbaths are the order of the day." |
| Max Erwin von Scheubner-Richter German | German Vice-consul in Erzurum Max Erwin von Scheubner-Richter is considered one of the most outspoken individuals against the deportations and subsequent massacres of Armenians. He was against the initial orders from German ambassador Vangenheim to limit the accusations of the anti-Armenian measures to friendly advice. Scheubner-Richter believed that the Armenians had no capabilities to start an uprising against the Ottoman government since all of the able bodied men were arrested and sent to labor battalions. Scheubner-Richter, who attempted to save the lives of as many Armenians as he could, believed that the deportations were based on "racial hatred" and that none can survive such a journey. It is believed that Adolf Hitler was informed about the details of the Armenian genocide through the details and eyewitness accounts provided Scheubner-Richter. Hitler is later quoted as saying, "Who still talks nowadays of the extermination of the Armenians?" before invading Poland on 22 August 1939. | "The partisans of Ittihad are unabashedly conceding that their ultimate aim [Endziel] is the total annihilation (ganzliche Ausrottung) of the Armenians of Turkey, adding, "After the war we no longer will have any Armenians in Turkey." "The Turkish government has used the situation offered by the war and the Armenian revolt in Van, Musch, Karahissar, and other towns forcefully to resettle the Anatolian Armenians in Mesopotamia. These government measures have unfolded in such a form that is identical to the extermination of the Armenians. Only by a forceful policy of extermination, a powerful destruction of the entire people, can the Turkish government achieve its desired goal, the 'solution' of the Armenian question." "The order of Kamil Pasha to deport all Armenians from Erzurum is not legitimate from a military point of view and in my opinion is founded on racial hatred." "I have conducted a series of conversations with competent and influential Turkish personages, and these are my impressions: A large segment of the Ittihadist party maintains the viewpoint that the Turkish empire should be based only on the principle of Islam and Pan-Turkism. Its non-Muslim and non-Turkish inhabitants should either be forcibly islamized, or otherwise they ought to be destroyed. These gentleman believe that the time is propitious for the realization of this plan. The first item on this agenda concerns the liquidation of the Armenians. Ittihad will dangle before the eyes of the allies the specter of an alleged revolution prepared by the Armenian Dashnak party. Moreover, local incidents of the social unrest and acts of Armenian self-defense will deliberately be provoked and inflated and will be used as pretexts to effect the deportations. Once en route, however, the convoys will be attacked and exterminated by Kurdish and Turkish brigands, and in part by gendarmes, who will be instigated for that purpose by Ittihad." |
| Franz Carl Endres German | German Military Major of the Ottoman army Franz Carl Endres served for three years as a Major in the Ottoman army. He served as the Chief of Staff to General Liman von Sanders. Endres regards himself as a "particular friend of the Turkish people." Endres provides his own assessment of the Armenian genocide in his books Die Ruine des Orients and Die Turkei: bilder und skizzen von land und volk where he concludes that 1.2 million Armenians perished. | "These deportations during the war were nothing less than organized mass murder...Pregnant women and innocent children were not spared." "Surely, no people on earth suffered as much during World War I as the Armenian. Over 1.2 million Armenians perished." |
| Otto von Lossow German | Major General, German Military Plenipotentiary in the Ottoman Empire Otto von Lossow became the German military attaché in Istanbul in the Ottoman Empire, where he assisted the Ottoman Army and the German military mission in planning the ongoing response to Allied landings in Gallipoli. He remained in the Ottoman Empire for the rest of the war, becoming in April 1916 the "German Military Plenipotentiary at the Imperial Embassy in Constantinople." | On 23 May 1918, he sent a cable stating: "the aim of Turkish policy is the permanent occupation of the Armenian districts and the extermination of the Armenians. All of Talaat's and Enver's assurances to the contrary are lies. In Constantinople, the extreme anti- Armenian trend has gained the upper hand." "The Turks have embarked upon the total extermination of the Armenians in Transcaucasia." "The aim of Turkish policy is, as I have reiterated, the taking of possession of Armenian districts and the extermination of the Armenians." "Talaat's government party wants to destroy all Armenians not only in Turkey, but also outside Turkey." "On the basis of all the reports and news coming to me here in Tiflis there hardly can be any doubt that the Turks systematically are aiming at the extermination of the few hundred thousand Armenians whom they left alive until now." |

=== Other ===
| Person | Occupation | Quotes, testimonies |
| Henry Morgenthau Sr. American | United States Ambassador to the Ottoman Empire, 1913–1916 Henry Morgenthau is regarded as one of the most prominent Americans who denounced and condemned the Armenian genocide. Throughout his career as an ambassador, Morgenthau had established contacts with many Young Turk politicians and especially Talat Pasha, the "mastermind" of the Armenian genocide. During the deportations and subsequent massacres of Armenians, Morgenthau repeatedly tried to intervene with Talat Pasha and pleaded on their behalf to save them. Early in 1915, when Morgenthau raised his concerns about the deportations of Armenians to Turkish authorities, the authorities expressed their "annoyance" over the concerns. Morgenthau, who coordinated much of the activity of the American consuls throughout the Empire, received from them reports nearly every day about the deportations and subsequent massacres that were taking place. Morgenthau estimated that a million Armenians were deported and referred to the deportations as a "death warrant to a whole race". When returning to the United States, Morgenthau helped support funds that helped the refugees and survivors of the Genocide. In 1918, Morgenthau wrote about his accounts in a book entitled, Ambassador Morgenthau's Story. The book dedicates a chapter to the plight of the Armenians called "Murder of a Nation" where he described the deportations and the atrocities as a "cold-blooded, calculating state policy." | Audio recording of Chapter 24, "The Murder of a Nation", from Ambassador Morgenthau's Story "The real purpose of the deportation was robbery and destruction; it really represented a new method of massacre. When the Turkish authorities gave the orders for these deportations, they were merely giving the death warrant to a whole race; they understood this well, and, in their conversations with me, they made no particular attempt to conceal the fact." "I am confident that the whole history of the human race contains no such horrible episode as this. The great massacres and persecutions of the past seem almost insignificant when compared to the sufferings of the Armenian race in 1915." "They have drawn from the fields the male population and thereby destroyed their agricultural communities. They have annihilated or displaced at least two thirds of the Armenian population and thereby deprived themselves of a very intelligent and useful race." "Deportation of and excesses against peaceful Armenians is increasing and from harrowing reports of eyewitnesses it appears that a campaign of race extermination is in progress under a pretext of reprisal against rebellion." |
| Walter M. Geddes American | American businessman Walter Mackintosh Geddes provided a detailed account of the situation of the Armenian deportees in the Syrian Desert. While in Aleppo, he witnessed thousands die of exposure and starvation. Upon returning from Aleppo back to Smyrna, Geddes remarked "the sights that I saw on my return trip were worse than those on my trip going". Greatly saddened and affected by the scenes he witnessed, he ultimately committed suicide on 7 November 1915. | "Several Turks[,] whom I interviewed, told me that the motive of this exile was to exterminate the race". "The destination of all these Armenians is Aleppo. Here they are kept crowded in all available vacant houses, khans, Armenian churches, courtyards and open lots. Their condition in Aleppo is beyond description. I personally visited several of the places where they were kept and found them starving and dying by the hundreds every day." |
| Giacomo Gorrini Italian | Italian Consul of Trabzon, 1911–1915 During World War I, Gorrini openly denounced the Armenian genocide through press articles and interviews and didn't hesitate to describe the policies of massacre perpetrated against the Armenians. He said if everyone had seen what he had, the condemnation of those acts would have been universal especially on the side of the Christian powers. He was in touch with American Ambassador Morgenthau and the Apostolic delegate to Constantinople Angelo Dolci, and this way he managed to save 50,000 Armenians from deportation and mass murder. In 1911–1915, he served as Italian Consul in Trabzon and was an eyewitness to the massacres in and around the area. In August 1915, with Italy's participation in the war effort and their subsequent declaration of war against the Ottoman Empire, Gorrini was forced to leave his office. | "The local authorities, and indeed the Moslem population in general, tried to resist, to mitigate it, to make omissions, to hush it up. But the orders of the Central Government were categorically confirmed, and all were compelled to resign themselves and obey. It was a real extermination and slaughter of the innocents, an unheard-of thing, a black page stained with the flagrant violation of the most sacred rights of humanity ... There were about 14,000 Armenians at Trebizond — Gregorians, Catholics, and Protestants. They had never caused disorders or given occasion for collective measures of police. When I left Trebizond, not a hundred of them remained." "As for the Armenians, they were treated differently in the different vilayets. They were suspect and spied upon everywhere, but they suffered a real extermination, worse than massacre, in the so-called 'Armenian Vilayets.' from the 24th June onwards, the Armenians were all "interned" — that is, ejected by force from their various residences and dispatched under the guard of the gendarmerie to distant, unknown destinations, which for a few will mean the interior of Mesopotamia, but for four-fifths of them has meant already a death accompanied by unheard-of cruelties." |
| George Horton American | American Consul of Izmir, 1911–1917 George Horton is particularly remembered for his book The Blight of Asia, which describes the systematic ethnic cleansing of the Christian population up until the Great Fire of Smyrna. Becoming American Consul of Izmir once again during the time of the Great Fire of Smyrna, Horton became an eyewitness to the destruction of the city and notes that the goal of the Ottoman government was to get rid of all Christian peoples in the Empire. Horton believed that Mustafa Kemal Atatürk continued the policies of the Young Turks. | "The Turks were now making a thorough and systematic job of killing Armenian men. The squads of soldiers were chiefly engaged in hunting down and killing Armenians." "I have also other statements from eyewitnesses, not natives of this country, of the highest standing in the religious and educational world, which leads me to believe that what is now taking place in Armenian Turkey, surpasses in deliberate and long protracted horror and in extent anything that has hitherto happened in the history of the world." "From what all these people worthy of the highest credence tell me, from 800,000 to 1,000,000 human beings are now going through this process of slow and hideous torture, and the movement instead of waning is increasing in ferocity, so that before it is finally over, in the neighborhood of 2,000,000 people will be affected, a very large percentage of whom will certainly perish as they are driven along for weeks and months without food or shelter and without the means of procuring these." "The murder of the Armenian race had been practically consummated during the years 1915–1916, and the prosperous and populous Greek colonies, with the exception of Smyrna itself, had been ferociously destroyed." |
| Rafael de Nogales Méndez Venezuelan | Venezuelan officer in the Ottoman army Nogales Méndez was hired by the Ottoman army as a mercenary while serving for the German army. During his service in the Ottoman army during World War I, Nogales Méndez witnessed the massacres of Christians in and around the eastern provinces of the Ottoman Empire and described them to be "unjustified massacres of the Christians." He believed that the massacres were committed by Khalil bey, the Commander and Chief of the Expeditionary Army he volunteered to serve. Nogales Méndez reported that the civil authorities found it preferable to murder at night with the help of local Kurds. When visiting Aghtamar, an island in Lake Van where the Armenian Cathedral of the Holy Cross is located, he notes that he uncovered the corpses of many priests. Nogales Méndez visited Diyarbakir on 26 June 1915 and spoke with the governor Mehmet Reşid, who was to be later known as the "butcher of Diyarbakir". Nogales Méndez recounts in his memoirs that Reşid mentioned to him that he received a telegram directly from Talat Pasha ordering him to "Burn-Destroy-Kill". | "At dawn I was awakened by the noise of shots and volleys. The Armenians had attacked the town. Immediately I mounted my horse and, followed by some armed men, went to see what was happening. Judge of my amazement to discover that the aggressors had not been the Armenians, after all, but the civil authorities themselves! Supported by the Kurds and the rabble of the vicinity, they were attacking and sacking the Armenian quarter, I succeeded at last, without serious accident, in approaching the Beledie reis of the town, who was directing the orgy; whereupon I ordered him to stop the massacre. He astounded me by replying that he was doing nothing more than carry out an unequivocal order emanating from the Governor-General of the province to exterminate all Armenian males of twelve years of age and over." "The civil authorities of the Sultan kill noiselessly and preferably by night, like vampires. Generally they choose as their victim's sepulchre deep lakes in which there are no indiscreet currents to bear the corpse to shore, or lonely mountain caves where dogs and jackals aid in erasing all traces of their crime. Among them I noticed some Kurds belonging to a group of several hundred which, on the following morning, was to help in killing off all the Armenians still in possession of some few positions and edifices around the town. Seeing that the enemy's fire was dwindling down, and unable to endure any longer the odor of scorched flesh from the Armenian corpses scattered among the smoking ruins of the church." |
| Jakob Künzler Swiss | Surgeon and Orientalist Jakob Künzler was known as the "Father of Armenian Orphans." With an invitation from Protestant missionary Johannes Lepsius, he visited Urfa and was his assistant. With the start of World War I, Künzler was heavily preoccupied by providing medical assistance to the needy. During his time in the Ottoman Empire, Künzler with his wife Elisabeth helped the destitute and wounded Armenian orphans in the Syrian desert. He was especially involved with the Near East Foundation and has saved thousands of Armenian lives. In his memoirs, In the Land of Blood and Tears, Künzler recounts the massacres he had witnessed in Ottoman Turkey and especially in Urfa. | "... two Turkish officials who appeared in Urfa. The rumor was that they hurried out in order to drive forward the extermination of the Armenian people with all their might, and they had the sanction of the highest state authority for doing so. They ordered on this basis, scarcely the moment they arrived in Urfa, the killing of all gathered prisoners. 'Why should we feed them any longer?' they said." "I resolved to serve that people as a true brother. Ever since, I have come to deeply believe that all barbaric schemes to destroy the Armenian people will always be destined to fail." "After what I experienced, I had felt that I had been summoned from the Heavens, the Lord had shown me the path [and] led me to a people, who, despite all adversities and miseries, had resolved to remain faithful to their God and the Lord ... Isn't this the same people who just a couple of years ago [1894–1896] had been subjected to horrible massacres? Their villages razed, plundered, and tens of thousands massacred? And yet, this very people, with resolute faith in God, continue to remain hopeful that better days are yet to come and that they will be more felicitous. God dispatched me to such a people so that I can attend to their wounds as their true brother." |
| James Harbord American | Lieutenant General in the United States Army James Harbord was sent to the Caucasus to lead an American Military Mission to Armenia in order to provide detailed information about the country to the United States. Upon returning to the United States, Harbord wrote Conditions in the Near East: Report of the American Military Mission to Armenia, which was a summary of the expedition that provided various details of the mission. The report includes maps, statistics, and a historical analyses of the country and its population. In addition to such details, Harbord collected evidence and information regarding the massacres of Armenians and was an eyewitness to them. | "The dead, from this wholesale attempt on the race, are variously estimated at from five hundred thousand to a million, the usual figure being about eight hundred thousand. Driven on foot under a hot sun, robbed of their clothing and such petty articles as they carried, prodded by bayonets if they lagged, starvation, typhus, and dysentery left thousands dead by the trail side." "Massacres and deportations were organized in the spring of 1915 under definite system, the soldiers going from town to town. The official reports of the Turkish Government show 1,100,000 as having been deported. Young men were first summoned to the government building in each village and then marched out and killed. The women, the old men, and children were, after a few days, deported to what Talat Pasha called "agricultural colonies," from the high, cool, breeze-swept plateau of Armenia to the malarial flats of the Euphrates and the burning sands of Syria and Arabia ... Mutilation, violation, torture, and death have left their haunting memories in a hundred beautiful Armenian valleys, and the traveler in that region is seldom free from the evidence of this most colossal crime of all ages." |
| Oscar S. Heizer American | American Consul in Trabzon While serving as American Consul in Trabzon, Oscar S. Heizer witnessed the Armenian genocide and often risked his own life to save the lives of Armenians. Being one of the first to report massacres, Heizer's initial reporting to the American consulate in Constantinople said that it was permissible "whenever the parents so desire" to leave children – girls up to the age of 15 and boys up to the age of ten – in the "orphanages by the Turks." Heizer also describes how some children were assimilated into Muslim Turks in a matter of weeks. Often writing about the systematic drowning of Armenians in the Black Sea, Heizer exposed the direct link and collaboration between the central Ottoman government and local members of the Committee of Union and Progress. | "This plan did not suit Nail Bey ... Many of the children were loaded into boats and taken out to sea and thrown overboard. I myself saw where 16 bodies were washed ashore and buried by a Greek woman near the Italian monastery." "It is impossible to convey an idea of the consternation and despair the publication of this proclamation has produced upon the people. I have seen strong, proud, wealthy men weep like children while they told me that they had given their boys and girls to Persian and Turkish neighbors. Even a strong man, without the necessary outfit and food would likely to perish on such a trip ... The People are helpless but are making preparations to start on the perilous journey." |
| Einar af Wirsén Swedish | Swedish Military Attaché Einar af Wirsén wrote much about the Armenian genocide in his memoirs Minnen från fred och krig ("Memories from Peace and War"). In his memoirs, Wirsén dedicated a chapter to the massacres entitled Mordet på en nation ("The Murder of a Nation"). He believed that the deportations were a way of concealing the massacres. The memoirs provide an important analysis of the deportations and massacres from a country who was not involved in World War I. | "Officially, these had the goal to move the entire Armenian population to the steppe regions of Northern Mesopotamia and Syria, but in reality they aimed to exterminate [utrota] the Armenians, whereby the pure Turkish element in Asia Minor would achieve a dominating position". "The annihilation of the Armenian nation in Asia Minor must revolt all human feelings ... The way the Armenian problem was solved was hair-raising. I can still see in front of me Talaat's cynical expression, when he emphasized that the Armenian question was solved". |
| Abram Isaac Elkus American | United States Ambassador to the Ottoman Empire, 1916–1917 Abram Isaac Elkus succeeded Henry Morgenthau as United States Ambassador to the Ottoman Empire in August 1916. By the time Elkus assumed his position as ambassador, the policy of deportations had come to an end. However, Elkus continued the work of Morgenthau and remained committed to the Armenians. Elkus reported that the Armenian situation in the Ottoman Empire had not changed since the departure of his predecessor, except that by now the deported had in large numbers been killed, or had died of exhaustion, starvation, or disease, or had become refugees in unfamiliar lands. Due to his support of the relief efforts, Elkus is known for saving the lives of thousands of Armenians. | "From report by eyewitness sent by Consul Jackson and from other reliable sources it appears that deportations accompanied by studied cruelties continue. Families are separated and scattered among Moslems. Clergy separated from their people, forced conversions to Islam perseveringly pushed, children and girls from deported families kidnapped. In order to avoid opprobrium of the civilized world, which the continuation of massacres would arouse, Turkish officials have now adopted and are executing the unchecked policy of extermination through starvation, exhaustion, and brutality of treatment hardly surpassed even in Turkish history." |
| Jesse B. Jackson American | American Consul in Aleppo, 1908–1923 According to Jackson the Armenian massacres were "carefully planned" and a "gigantic plundering scheme as well as a final blow to extinguish the race." In September 1915 he estimated that one million Armenians were killed in a year. Jackson later became a leading figure in the relief effort of Armenian refugees and is known for having saved thousands of Armenians during the genocide. | He remarked that the outrages "upon a defenseless and inoffensive people that demand nothing more than to be given a chance to eke out at the best a miserable existence" and continued by saying, "it is without doubt a carefully planned scheme to thoroughly extinguish the Armenian race." "One of the most terrible sights ever seen in Aleppo was the arrival early in August, 1915, of some 5,000 terribly emaciated, dirty, ragged and sick women and children, 3,000 in one day and 2,000 the following day. These people were the only survivors of the thrifty and well to do Armenian population of the province of Sivas, where the Armenian population had once been over 300,000." |
| Cossva Anckarsvärd Swedish | Swedish Ambassador to the Ottoman Empire, 1915–1920 Anckarsvärd was an ambassador who traveled frequently throughout the Empire and established many contacts. During the massacres, Anckarsvärd highlighted the aim of the Young Turk government and its policies to "exterminate the Armenian nation". When reporting to the Swedish Foreign Ministry, Anckarsvärd used terms such as "the annihilation Armenian nation", "wipe out the Armenian nation," "extermination of the Armenians", etc. to describe the events. | "The persecutions of the Armenians have reached hair-raising proportions and all points to the fact that the Young Turks want to seize the opportunity, since due to different reasons there are no effective external pressure to be feared, to once and for all put an end to the Armenian question. The means for this are quite simple and consist of the extermination (utrotandet) of the Armenian nation." "It is obvious that the Turks are taking the opportunity to, now during the war, annihilate [utplåna] the Armenian nation so that when the peace comes no Armenian question longer exists". "[The deportations] can not be any other issue than an annihilation war against the Greek nation in Turkey and as measures hereof they have been implementing forced conversions to Islam, in obvious aim to, that if after the end of the war there again would be a question of European intervention for the protection of the Christians, there will be as few of them left as possible." |
| Leslie A. Davis American | American Consul in Harput, 1914 to 1917 When serving as American Consul in Harput, Leslie A. Davis was an eyewitness to the massacres. Davis summarized what he witnessed and reported it to the United States State Department. He was among the mixed party of Americans who examined the mass graves of Armenians killed near Harput. After seeing tens of thousands of corpses in and around Lake Geoljuk (present-day Lake Hazar), Davis subsequently wrote a vivid account to the Department of State. Davis had also been instrumental in saving the lives of many Armenians by helping them cross the Euphrates River into Russia. Though there were warnings by the Turkish government not to help the Armenians, Davis still continued to aid them. Due to what he witnessed during the Armenian genocide, Leslie A. Davis referred to Harput as the "slaughterhouse province" which became a book under the same name. | "Any doubt that may have been expressed in previous reports as to the Government's intentions in sending away the Armenians have been removed and any hope that may have been expressed as to the possibility of some of them surviving have been destroyed. It has been no secret that the plan was to destroy the Armenian race as a race, but the methods used have been more cold-blooded and barbarous, if not more effective, than I had first supposed." "All of them were in rags and many of them were almost naked. They were emaciated, sick, diseased, filthy, covered with dirt and vermin, resembling animals far more than human beings. They had been driven along for many weeks like herds of cattle, with little to eat, and most of them had nothing except the rags on their backs. When the scant rations which the Government furnished were brought for distribution the guards were obliged to beat them back with clubs, so ravenous were they. There were few men among them, most of the men having been killed by the Kurd before their arrival in Harput. Many of the women and children also had been killed and very many others had died on the way from sickness and exhaustion. Of those who had started, only a small portion were still alive and they were rapidly dying." |
| Fridtjof Nansen Norwegian | Norwegian explorer, scientist, statesman, author and Nobel winner Though Fridtjof Nansen is renowned in Norway for his explorations and scientific writings, he is also famous for supporting the plight of the Armenians during the Armenian genocide. Nansen supported Armenian refugees in acquiring the Nansen passport, which allowed them to travel freely to various countries. Nansen wrote the book, Armenia and the Near East in 1923 which describes his sympathies to the plight of the Armenians in the wake of losing its independence to the Soviet Union. The book was translated in many languages including Norwegian, English, French, German, Russian and Armenian. In the book, Nansen characterizes the genocide as "atrocities which far exceeded any we known in history, both in their extent and their appalling cruelty." He believed that the deportations was not a 'necessary military measure' as claimed by the Ottoman government, but instead that "the Turks already had what they considered the splendid idea of carrying out the whole plan of extermination." After visiting Armenia, Nansen wrote two additional books called "Gjennern Armenia" ("Across Armenia"), published in 1927 and "Gjennern Kaukasus til Volga" ("Through Caucasus to Volga"). | "The massacres that started in 1915 have nothing to compare with the history of mankind. The massacres by Abdul Hamid are minor in comparison to what today's Turks have done." "Then, in June 1915, the horrors began to which we know no parallel in history. From all the villages and towns of Cilicia, Anatolia, and Mesopotamia the Armenian Christians were driven forth on their death march; the work was done systematically, clearing out one district after another, whether the population happened to be near the scene of war or hundreds of kilometres away from it. There was to be a clean sweep of all Armenians. As the majority of men had already been taken for war work, it was chiefly a matter of turning women, children, and the aged and crippled out of house and home. They were only given a few days' or hours' notice. They had to leave behind all their property: houses, fields, crops, cattle, furniture, tools, and implements. Everything was confiscated by the Turkish authorities. The things they managed to carry with them, such as money, jewellery, or other valuables, and even clothes, were subsequently taken away from them by the gendarmes; and if any of them had been allowed to take their wagons and draught animals, the gendarmes appropriated them on the way. The poor creatures were rounded up from the different villages and driven in long columns across the mountains to the Arabian desert plains, where no provision had been made for the reception and maintenance of these herds of starving wretches, just as nothing had been done to keep them alive on the march. The idea was that those who did not succumb or get killed on the way should at any rate die of starvation." |
| Gertrude Bell British | Writer, traveler, and archeologist Gertrude Bell was an English writer, traveler, political officer, administrator, archaeologist and spy who explored, mapped, and became highly influential to British imperial policy-making due to her skill and contacts, built up through extensive travels in Greater Syria, Mesopotamia, Asia Minor, and Arabia. In comparison to previous massacres, Bell wrote that the massacres of preceding years "were not comparable to the massacres carried out in 1915 and the succeeding years." With the flow of refugees into Syria, Bell reported that in Damascus, "Turks sold Armenian women openly in the public market." | Reporting a statement by a Turkish prisoner-of-war: "The battalion left Aleppo on 3 February and reached Ras al-Ain in twelve hours....some 12,000 Armenians were concentrated under the guardianship of some hundred Kurds...These Kurds were called gendarmes, but in reality mere butchers; bands of them were publicly ordered to take parties of Armenians, of both sexes, to various destinations, but had secret instructions to destroy the males, children and old women...One of these gendarmes confessed to killing 100 Armenian men himself...the empty desert cisterns and caves were also filled with corpses...No man can ever think of a woman's body except as a matter of horror, instead of attraction, after Ras al-Ain." In regards to the Adana massacre, Bell wrote: "But in the Armenian villages panic was scarcely laid to rest. Tales of Adana were in every mouth; tale, too, of the narrow margin which had lain between the speakers themselves and massacre. And as I journeyed further west I came into the skirts of destruction and saw charred heaps of mud and stone which had been busy centres of agricultural life. The population, destitute and homeless, had defended itself and come off with naked existence—a respite of six years, it we had known it, until 1915 carried out the work which 1909 had left uncompleted." |
| Mohammad-Ali Jamalzadeh Persian | Persian writer and journalist Mohammad-Ali Jamalzadeh was one of the most prominent writers of Iran in the 20th century. During his youth, he studied in Europe where he joined a group of Iranian nationalists in Berlin who were to eventually start a newspaper (Rastakhiz) in Baghdad in 1915. After remaining in Baghdad, Jamalzadeh went to Constantinople where he witnessed the deportations of Armenians and encountered many corpses during his journey. He wrote of his experiences and eyewitness accounts decades later in two books entitled "Qatl-e Amm-e Armanian" (Armenian massacres) and "Qatl o ḡārat-e Arāmaneh dar Torkiya" (On the massacres of Armenians in Ottoman Turkey) which were published in 1972 and 1963 respectively. | "We moved from Baghdad and Aleppo towards Istanbul by hand-cart and wagon. From the first days of our journey, we met many groups of Armenians. The Turkish armed guards and gendarmes drove them (on foot) towards death and perdition. First, it made us very surprised, but little by little we got used to it and we even did not look at them, and indeed it was hard to look at them. By the hit of lashes and weapons, they drove forward hundreds of weeping weak and on foot Armenian women and men with their children. Young men weren't seen among the people, because all the young men were sent to the battle fields or were killed for precaution." "Armenian girls had shaved all their hairs, and were completely bald, to discourage Arab and Turkish men from harassing them. Two to three gendarmes by the hit of the lashes drove these groups forward, like cattle. If one of the captives fell because of tiredness, weakness or by accident, they were to remain behind and kept back forever. The groaning of their relatives were useless." "So step by step, we saw Armenian men and women who were fallen near the road since they were either dead or were giving life or agony of death. Later we understood that some of the young residents of that area had not kept honor of some Armenian girls who were dying or had died in order to satisfy their lust. Our way was in the direction of Western Bank of Euphrates, and every day we saw the corpses in the river, which the river carries them with it." |
| Eitan Belkind Turkish/British | Founding member of NILI Eitan Belkind was one of the founding members of NILI, a Jewish organization that fought against the Ottoman Empire through the support of the British forces. Belkind joined the Ottoman army and was subsequently transferred where Cemal Pasha was stationed in Syria. During his time in Syria, while secretly trying to garner support from the British, Belkind witnessed the massacres against Armenians and wrote of them in his memoirs So It Was which was published decades later. | "The Armenian camp was one kilometer away from our house. The screaming continued all night. We asked what was happening, they told us that children were being taken from their mothers to live in dormitories and continue their education. However, in the morning when we set off and crossed the bridge across Euphrates, I was shocked to see the river red with blood and beheaded corpses of children floating on the water. The scene was horrible, as there was nothing we could do." "In my trips in the south of Syria and Iraq I saw with my own eyes the extermination of the Armenian nation, I watched the atrocious murders, and saw children's heads cut off and watched the burning of innocent people whose only wrongdoing was to be Armenian." "After a three-day ride I reached the heart of Mesopotamia where I was a witness to a terrible tragedy...The Circassian soldiers ordered the Armenians to gather thorns and thistles and to pile them into a tall pyramid...afterwards they tied all the Armenians who were there, almost five thousand souls, hand to hand, encircled them like a ring around the pile of thistles and set it afire in a blaze which rose up to heaven together with the screams of the wretched people who were burned to death by the fire...Two days later I returned to this place and saw the charred bodies of thousands of human beings." |
| Fred D. Shepard American | Physicist of the American hospital in Antep Fred D. Shepard had a history of helping Armenians during the Hamidian massacres and the Adana massacre. However, during the Armenian genocide, while stationed in the American Hospital in Antep (today Gaziantep), Shepard is especially known to have attempted many times to save the Armenians from deportations and subsequent massacre. During the genocide, he intervened on behalf of the Armenians to the governor general of Aleppo, Mehmet Celal, by persuading him not to proceed with the deportations of Armenians. Upon hearing from the governor general of Aleppo that the orders came from the central authorities in the capital Constantinople, Shepard went to the capital in order to try to prevent further deportations. Though he was unsuccessful at stopping them, he did manage however to collect relief funds for the deportees. Meanwhile, he also received assurances from central authorities that the Catholic and Protestant Armenians would not be deported. However, when he returned to Antep, he had learned that the assurances were not fulfilled and the Catholic and Protestant Armenians were deported and killed. Shepard also reported to the Henry Morgenthau, the American Ambassador to the Ottoman Empire, that in Zeitun and neighboring villages alone, 26,500 Armenians were deported with many of them being sent to Aleppo. In the report, he also requested aid "until they get established in their new surroundings," since in a matter of months "two thirds or three fourths of them will die of starvation and disease." | Alice Shepard Riggs describes when Shepard intervened on behalf of the Armenians: "When the wave of deportation had reached, and swept over, the neighboring towns and was threatening Aintab, Dr. Shepard made a strong appeal to the Vali [Governor General] of the province of Aleppo, and this official, who was a righteous man, firmly prevented the action being carried out. Another righteous man of another town refused to send out the innocent people of his city, saying, "You may deport me and my family, if you will, but I will not carry out these orders." He was soon removed from his post. The righteous Vali of Aleppo, too, was sent away, and the fiendish work ordered against the "Christian nation" still went on." Riggs also describes how he appealed on behalf of the Armenians to the central government in Constantinople: "Having failed in his efforts to save all, and brokenhearted at the thought of this final tragedy. Dr. Shepard started for Aleppo to make one last appeal. Nothing could be accomplished there. "The orders were from higher up." So the doctor decided to take his appeal higher, and set out on the long journey to Constantinople. Five days later he wrote that the Imperial Government had graciously granted immunity from deportation to the Protestant and Catholic Armenians." However, Riggs concludes that the assurances were not fulfilled: "On his arrival in Aintab, he found, to his grief, that the immunity from deportation, which the Imperial Government had so graciously granted to Protestant and Catholic Armenians, was but a camouflage immunity. Several of the college professors and their families had already been deported, the young men had been scattered and killed, and no hope was left of re-opening the college that fall." |
| Johann von Pallavicini Hungarian | Austro-Hungarian Ambassador to the Ottoman Empire, 1906–1918 During World War I, Johann von Pallavicini successfully worked to bring the Ottoman Empire into the war on the side of the Central Powers. Due to his long tenure and being the dean of the diplomatic corps in Constantinople, he wielded a large influence over events in the Ottoman Empire. However, his role with regard to the Armenian question has been debated by historians over the years and criticism has been raised that he did not protest loudly enough. The reports that he sent to Vienna clearly show that he was aware of the nature of the Ottoman initiative and that it involved a "centrally planned and organised extermination". Already in June 1915, he wrote to Vienna that "the Armenian population is not only being subjected to the greatest misery but also to a total extermination (einer gänzlichen Ausrottung)". To his defence, however, records also show that he did protest but to no avail. | "The Armenian population which is being expelled from its homeland is not only being subjected to the greatest misery but also to a total extermination." "The manner in which the Armenian are being deported for resettlement purposes is tantamount to death a verdict for the affected people." "The time will come when Turkey will have to account for this policy of extermination." |
| Lewis Einstein American | American Charge d'Affairs in Constantinople Einstein's diplomatic career began in 1903, when he was appointed as Third Secretary of Legation at Constantinople. He advanced from Second Secretary to First Secretary and then Charge d'Affairs during the Young Turk Revolution of 1908, remaining in Constantinople despite the hostilities. After serving as ambassador to Costa Rica, Einstein returned to the Ottoman Empire and continued his diplomatic career. In 1915, during the start of World War I, Einstein kept a diary from the months of April to September. The diary described the most critical points in the Ottoman Empire's involvement in the war. Einstein also paid special attention to the massacres of Armenians and wrote about it extensively throughout the diary. He described the events and stated that "the policy of murder then carried out was planned in the coldest blood" in the preface of his diary. He blamed the cooperative pact between Germany and the Ottoman Empire as the supportive and responsible agents behind the massacres. He also pointed out that the stockpiles of armaments that was used as a justification for the arrests was in fact a "myth". By 4 August, Einstein wrote in a diary entry that the "persecution of Armenians is assuming unprecedented proportions, and is carried out with nauseating thoroughness." He kept in contact with both Enver and Talat and tried to persuade them to reverse their policy towards the Armenians. In a diary entry, he states that Talat insisted that the Armenians sided with the enemies and that Enver believed the policy was out of military necessity, but in reality both leaders feared the Armenians. Einstein's diary was published in 1918 under the title Inside Constantinople: A Diplomatist's Diary During the Dardanelles Expedition. | "The murder of Armenians has become almost a sport, and one Turkish lady passing one of these caravans, and thinking she too would relish killing an Armenian, on the guards' invitation took out a revolver and shot the first poor wretch she saw. The whole policy of extermination transcends one's capacity for indignation. It has been systematic in its atrocious cruelty, even to the extent of throwing blame for the murders on the Kurds, who are instigated by the Government to lie in wait in order to kill and pillage. Its horrors would be unbelievable if less universally attested. For scientific cruelty and butchery it remains without precedent. The Turks have willfully destroyed the great source of economic wealth in their country. The persecution is madness, but one wonders when the day will come, and if it is close enough at hand still to save the few remnants of this wretched community." "An engineer who had just returned from the interior related to me his experiences in the region of Sivas. Throughout the interior wholesale arrests of Armenian had taken place, and it was the impression of his Turkish friends that when those arrested were led away at night, it was to be butchered in solitude. He saw caravans of Armenian women and children arriving from the Caucasus region. He did not know what fate awaited them, but Turkish friends told him that they too would be massacred." "In town the arrests of Armenians are proceeding. So far they have taken only those of provincial birth or whose fathers were not Constantinople-born. But it is a beginning, and if given time the whole Armenian population will probably share the same fate. They are first thrown into prison, and then deported, to be massacred or die of hunger in the interior after they have been robbed of all their belongings." |
| Johannes Østrup Danish | Professor and orientalist Johannes Østrup was a Danish philologist and professor at the University of Copenhagen where he served as rector from 1934 to 1935. Østrup was noted for conducting a survey tour of the Middle East. After the study tour in the Middle East, he rode on horseback back to Copenhagen, crossing much of the Ottoman Empire. Along his way, he met with several Young Turk politicians and leaders. In his memoirs, Østrup recounts his meeting with Talat Pasha in the autumn of 1910. According to Østrup, during such meetings, Talat talked openly about his plans to "exterminate" the Armenians. | "It had really been Talat's plan to exterminate all of the Armenian people, and the plan did not originate as the result of a war psychosis. I spoke with Talat on several occasions in the autumn of 1910, and among many other things we also talked about the Armenians. "You see," he said, "between us and this people there is an incompatibility which cannot be solved in a peaceful manner; either they will completely undermine us, or we will have to annihilate them. If I ever come to power in this country, I will use all my might to exterminate the Armenians." Six years later he fulfilled his promise; the persecutions which were effectuated in the years of 1915 and 1916 cost—according to the lowest counts—the lives of more than 1.5 million persons. And yet one could not but like Talat; he was a barbarian or a fanatic, whatever one wants to call it, but his soul was free from deceit." |
| Józef Pomiankowski Austrian/Polish | Divisional General and Vice Marshal, Austrian Military Attaché and Military Plenipotentiary to the Ottoman Empire Josef Pomiankowski had a keen insight into the functioning of the Ottoman government and was familiar with the decisions and activities of the Young Turk party. In his memoirs, Pomiankowski wrote, "I had ample opportunity to get to know the land and the people of Turkey. During the war, however, I was from start to finish eyewitness of practically all the decisions and activities of the Turkish government." In 1909, Pomiankowski stated that the Young Turk government planned to "exterminate" non-Muslim conquered peoples. When the genocide occurred, it was Pomiankowski who condemned the genocide and urged Austrian diplomats to take stance against the genocide, as well as trying to obtain security for the Armenians, but not successful. | "The Van uprising certainly was an act of desperation. The local Armenians realized that general massacres against the Armenians had already started and they would be the next target. In the course of the summer 1915 the Turkish government with inexorable consequence brought its bloody task of extermination of an entire nation to an end." "The barbaric order to deport and resettle in the northern desert regions of Arabia, i.e., Mesopotamia, where the Euphrates flows, the entire Armenian population of Asia Minor in reality entailed the extermination [Ausrottung] of Asia Minor's Armenian population." |
| Henry Harness Fout American | Member of the Near East Foundation Henry Harness Fout was a Bishop of the United Brethren Church located in the United States. He had worked for the Near East Foundation which aimed at assisting Armenian refugees of the Genocide who were scattered throughout the Middle East. Fout stated that the Armenians were in an "appalling condition" and that they needed immediate help from the United States. | "There is plenty of mute evidence in the hundreds of thousands of skeletons scattered throughout the Turkish Empire that the Turks sought to exterminate the Armenians by systematic massacre. The Armenians were driven like herded cattle from one locality to another until they were exhausted by tortures and torments of unbelievable character. In addition the Turks sought to wipe out the clergy of Armenia. Only eight out of forty-four Bishops survive, while only 10 per cent. of the clergy is living today." "Turkey by her inhuman treatment, in my opinion, has lost the right to be entrusted with authority to rule. From various estimates I have reached the conclusion that out of the Armenian nation of 3,000,000 at the outbreak of the war, 1,000,000 were massacred. The condition of the remainder is most appalling." |
| Stanley Savige Australian | Lieutenant general and officer of the Australian Army Stanley George Savige was an Australian Army soldier and officer who served in World War I and World War II. | "These we handed over to two Syrians who were to follow on behind. The rest of us rode out to pick up the 100 men. 6 miles, no men, asked Chief why, he said they were camped on the left near the river a little ahead. Got there, no men. People streaming in in thousands. The women rush us kissing hands & feet& amp; calling down the blessing of God. Midday, no men, no food, but hear Dr. Shed is ahead fighting the Turks & Kurds. The villages en route all destroyed by Christians & in flames, many murdered Persians [Armenians and Assyrians] both male & female in all these places. At 4pm we reach Mrs. Shed who is looking after a bunch of wounded women. She said her husband was a little further back with a handful of men putting up a rearguard. Still no sign of our 100 men. Apparently all the men went back to save their families." "We then pushed on to. Shed & found him with 24 men as a Rearguard. I asked him why the others were not helping but he simply said "They are Armenians & Syrians". We urged him to go back to Sain Kala at once as he was wanted in handling the people there. I then took over these 24 & as Shed had had his last fight 18 miles further on decided to ride out & hide my force in the rough country & give them a go with the M.G's trusting that the new weapon would lead the enemy to believe that British Troops were now in the field & bluff them off. The great anxiety was to get the people back to Sain Kala before the Turkish Commander at Maindab (who has 250 Turks & 250 Kurds) can get down on us. We rode on past Chailkanan to a village in a narrow valley 6 miles ahead. Before we got to the village we'd left our horses tethered to the poplar trees on the outskirts & 2 miles South a long valley branches off to the right & apparently joined the main one North of this village." |
| Anatole France French | World-famous French academician, Nobel Prize laureate, famous writer During the genocide committed against Armenians, a number of prominent figures of the world condemned the genocide against Armenians. Anatole France (1844-1924), world-famous French academician, Nobel Prize laureate, famous writer. On April 9, 1916, he delivered a speech at the Sorbonne University in Paris. 96 years after this call, on January 23, 2012, the upper house of the French Parliament approved the bill criminalizing denial of the Armenian Genocide. | ...We understood that the long-lasting unequal struggle of the Turkish oppressor and the Armenian is the struggle of tyranny, the struggle of barbarism against the spirit of justice and freedom. And when we saw that victim of Turkey, looking at us with dying eyes, in which a ray of hope flashed, we finally understood that it is our sister who is dying in the East and she is dying precisely because she is our sister, whose crime is that she was filled with our feelings, she loved what we love, she thought as we think, she believed in what we believe, and she valued wisdom, justice, art like us. This was her unforgivable crime. |

=== Christian missionaries ===
| Person | Occupation | Quotes, testimonies |
| Anna Hedvig Büll Russian | Christian missionary In 1909, Büll, then a Russian citizen, again attempted to go to work with Armenians, however, her trip was put on hold by the Adana massacre in Cilicia. Instead, Büll attended for two years a seminary for missionary teachers. After finishing her studies, Büll was finally able to proceed for Cilicia where she worked as a teacher at an Armenian orphanage in Maraş between 1911 and 1916. When the war broke out and Ottoman declaration of war on Russia, she was one of the only few Russian nationals to stay in the Ottoman Empire. In 1915, Büll witnessed the Armenian genocide in Cilicia and was instrumental in saving the lives of about two thousand Armenian children and women when Maraş was turned into "The City of Orphans". Büll was recalled from Maraş in 1916. In 1921, Büll was sent by the newly founded Action Chrétienne en Orient to Aleppo, Syria, where she established a refugee camp for the survivors of the Armenian genocide. She also organized medical help for plague victims and the construction of two hospitals. Büll organized the establishment of weaving shops, gardens, an Armenian language school, and other enterprises to better the lives of the refugees. In 1951, when most of the refugees under her care repatriated to Armenian SSR, Hedvig Büll was refused a visa by the Soviet authorities. She then returned to Europe in 1951. She died on 3 October 1981, near Heidelberg, Germany, after having spent more than 40 years of her life for the betterment of lives of Armenian refugees. On 29 April 1989, a memorial tablet was dedicated for her by the Armenian-Estonian Cultural Society on her birth house in Haapsalu, Kooli Street 5. Her memory is also preserved by a monument in Armenia and at the Armenian Genocide Museum in Yerevan. Among the refugees she helped to save and in Armenia she is sometimes referred to as the Mother of Armenians. | "In 1915 during Easter, a terrible calamity happened with the Armenians, I could hear the following words, "Where is your brother Abel, do I hear call of blood from the earth?" My brother, do these words make us perceive all these differently? Yes, they were my brothers and sisters, who went to our Lord when the earlier planned massacre reached the city Marash. I saw rivers of tears; I heard cries of salvage, appeals to God. I could hear their wailing, "My Lord, save us!" Poor suffering Christians condemned to cursing..." Here is another group of refugees, coming down of the mountain. Women, men, old and young, the invalid, the blind, the sick incessantly went along the rocky roads in burning sun. There are more terrible days in store for them, and perhaps death. The policemen hurry them and they, feeble, all fell on the ground in the cattle yard in Kahn. I saw my brothers and sisters in that condition. Next day they again were on their way. A young woman's corpse lies on the ground with her newly born child, born here at this night; she was not able to continue her way. There is also an invalid; he was not able to continue his way as well. Thousands of people continue their way, hardly dragging their wounded feet, together with other Christians they try to reach Marash. And if your brother is among them, what consolation it is to the soul? But as Marash is seized at mourning, I saw more and more crowds of people leaving their city. They walk silently unable even to cry. I see an old man as he casts a parting glance to the city. There is also our Zaruhi in the crowd; she takes her blind mother's hand that is in the harness tied to the horse saddle, she can neither stand nor walk; she is a blind widow and is being sent. Who will count the corpses of the dead lying along the death road, having lost their children or those who have been kidnapped, crying and calling for their mothers?" |
| Frederick G. Coan American | Presbyterian missionary Frederick G. Coan was a Christian missionary who served in Persia for over 50 years. He provided detailed eyewitness accounts of the deportations and massacres of Armenians. During World War I and at the start of the Armenian genocide, Coan was continuing his missionary activities in Urmia. On 2 January 1915, Kurdish and Turkish regular troops broke through the Russian military lines and had already advanced their regiments deep into Persia and stationed themselves around the Urmia plain, where Coan was stationed. As a result, an estimated 20,000 Armenians and other Christians sought immediate protection. Coan managed to provide the necessary shelter for these refugees and provided as much provisions as possible. After five months of providing care for the refugees and as the deportations of Armenians had just begun, Coan made a desperate attempt to travel around the districts where the Armenians were deported to in order to further assist their needs. In the summer of 1915, Coan reported encountering a "trench full of human bones". Coan believed that the number of dead during the Armenian genocide exceeded one million people and referred to the Ottoman government's policy towards the Armenians as one of "extermination". | "Then, through deportation, they determined to complete what had already been begun by the sword. The Turkish soldiers, in many cases offered by Germans, drove the Armenians across the plains, perpetrating upon them brutalities that were enough to break anyone's heart. I found on day a great mass of human bones, thirty feet high, and I said to my Turkish guide: "How do you account for this?" He replied: "We got tired of driving them, we got tired of hearing their moans and cries, and took them up that that precipice one day and flung them down to get rid of the job." "There was a trench full of human bones, and I was told of the brave fight that 2,000 Armenians, standing for their homes and for the honor of their wives and daughters, had waged with their flintlock rifles against the Turkish troops. They held off a Turkish regiment for two weeks, until their ammunition was exhausted. Then the Turkish officer, taking an oath on the Koran, the most binding of all oaths to Moslems, promised the Armenian fighters that if they surrendered, he would, in deference to their courage, allowed them to go unharmed. These 2,000 men had no sooner surrendered than they were given picks and spades and told to dig a trench. When they had dug it they were shoved in with the bayonet." |
| Maria Jacobsen Danish | Christian missionary Maria Jacobsen wrote the Diaries of a Danish Missionary: Harpoot, 1907–1919, which according to Armenian genocide scholar Ara Sarafian, is a "documentation of the utmost significance" for research of the Armenian genocide. Jacobsen will later be known for having saved thousands of Armenians during the aftermath of the Armenian genocide through various relief efforts. | "It is quite obvious that the purpose of their departure is the extermination of the Armenian people." "Conditions now are completely different from what they were during the massacres of 20 years ago. What could be done then is impossible now. The Turks know very well about the war raging in Europe, and that the Christian nations are too busy to take care of Armenians, so they take advantage of the times to destroy their "enemies"." |
| Henry H. Riggs American | Christian missionary and president of Euphrates College Henry H. Riggs was stationed in Kharpert during the Armenian genocide. His book Days of Tragedy in Armenia: Personal Experiences in Harpoot, 1915–1917, is considered to be one of the most detail accounts of the Armenian genocide in the English language, provides an important eyewitness account of the events. Riggs concluded that the deportation of Armenians was part of an extermination program organized by the Ottoman government. | "The attack on the Armenian people, which soon developed into a systematic attempt to exterminate the race, was a cold-blooded, unprovoked, deliberate act, planned and carried out without popular approval, by the military masters of Turkey." "Very good evidence exists for the belief that both there and Ras-ul-Ain, also in the same desert, the people were massacred wholesale as soon as they left the villages where they had been quartered. At the beginning of the period under discussion, that is, at the beginning of 1916, there were in exile in that district something like 485,000 Armenians. Fifteen months later, after the last deportation had been completed, not more than 113,000 out of that throng could be located. Out of the 372,000 who had perished most had died from starvation and disease, but many thousands were also massacred at the last moment, when apparently the Turkish government had tired of the pretense of carrying out the theory of deportation." |
| Bodil Katharine Biørn Norwegian | Christian missionary Bodil Katharine Biørn was a Christian missionary stationed in Mush when the Armenian genocide started. She was instrumental in saving thousands of Armenian lives. Biørn wrote much of what she witnessed in her personal diary. She is also noted for taking hundreds of photographs of the situation providing details of the events in the back of each photograph. Bodil eventually took care of Armenian orphans in Syria, Lebanon and Constantinople. In 1922 she founded an orphanage named "Lusaghbyur" in Alexandropol, Soviet Armenia. Then she continued her work by aiding the Armenian refugees in Syria and Lebanon. By the initiative of the Armenian community of Aleppo, the Norwegian city of Kragero has erected a statue honoring Bodil Biorn. | "Of the Armenian part of Mush, where 10,000 people lived, only ruins were left. It happened during the warmest time of the year, the heat and the smell from the burning houses and all the people who were burnt to death and all the killed, was almost impossible to bear. It was an awful time. Almost the whole Christian population was murdered, often in a gruesome manner. 40 ox wagons with women and children were burned in this manner. 11 canons were put on the heights above the city and fired at the Armenian quarters. Some managed to flee to the mountains, some fled through Persia to the Armenian republic, some were deported, but the majority was killed. The Armenian part of the city and all Armenian villages were in ruins." |
| Ernst Jakob Christoffel German | German Evangelical pastor and founder of the Christian Blind Mission Ernest J. Christoffel was a practicing Evangelical priest and a medical doctor who assisted the blind in the city of Malatia. He practiced his profession from 1908 to 1919 when he was expelled from the country after World War I. When the Genocide took place, Christoffel was instrumental in saving many Armenian lives during the deportations. Christoffel eventually reported what he had witnessed during the Armenian genocide in published books and letters. One such book, Zwischen Saat und Ernte (Between sowing and harvest), provides a vivid account of the deportations and subsequent massacres of the Armenian deportees. | "The losses to the Armenian people during the period since the deportation in the summer of 1915 until today have surpassed 2 [1] million. Some of them were killed in jail after suffering dreadful agonies of torture. Most of the women and children died of hunger, disease or were also murdered en route to their place of exile. I cannot go into details. Should my dear friend, Andreas Krueger, have a chance to see you, he will more or less be able to fill in my naked sentences. The last wretched few of the deported eke out a miserable existence on the plains of Syria and northern Mesopotamia, and their numbers are depleting daily due to diseases and forced conversions. Only a few men are left. There are still a number of scattered or refugees in the Anatolian towns, most of whom, however, have converted to Islam. Apart from the forced conversions which took place in masses, a further characteristic symbol was the mass adoption of Armenian children. This was carried out for many thousands. They are being artificially turned into fanatical Mohammedans. The number of murders has decreased, but the process of annihilation has not stopped, merely taken on other forms. The people have been robbed of everything. Possessions, family, honour, religion, life." |
| George E. White American | Head of the Anatolia College in Merzifon Prior to the establishment of the Young Turk government in 1908, White regarded the demographic situation in the eastern provinces of the Empire as an "internal breach that would come to surface as a deadly wound." He noted that because a large segment of the population were Christian, conflict in the area would be inevitable during an opportune time and conditions. In 1913 White became president of the Marsovan Anatolian College and continued in the position until 1933. Regarding the deportees, White said "the misery, the agony, the suffering were beyond power of words to express, almost beyond the power of hearts to conceive. In bereavement, thirst, hunger, loneliness, hopelessness, the groups were swept on and on along roads which had no destination." During the Armenian genocide, White attempted to save the lives of many Armenians. In one such instance, White "refused to tell" where Armenians were hiding to save them from getting deported or killed. In the aftermath of the Armenian genocide, White was involved with the Near East Relief Fund and headed an expedition consisting of 250 people with the objective of aiding the Armenian refugees. He was also in support of an independent Armenia because he believed that without a free Armenia, Armenians would have "no real security for the life of a man, the honor of a woman, the welfare of a child, the prosperity of a citizen or the rights of a father." | "The situation for Armenia, became excessively acute in the Spring of 1915, when the Turks determined to eliminate the Armenian question by eliminating the Armenians. The Armenians questions arise from political and religious causes." "On the pretext of searching for deserting soldiers, concealing bombs, weapons, seditious literature or revolutionists, the Turkish officers arrested about 1,200 Armenian men at Marsovan, accompanying their investigations by horrible brutalities. There was no revolutionary activity in our region whatever. The men were sent out in lots of one or two hundred in night 'deportations' to the mountains, where trenches had been prepared. Coarse peasants, who were employed to do what was done, said it was a 'pity to waste bullets,' and they used axes." "Girls and young women were snatched away at every turn on the journey. The girls sold at Marsovan for from $2 to $4 each. I know, because, I heard the conversation on men engaged in the traffic. I know because I was able to ransom three girls at the price of $4.40." "Then the Turks turned on the women and children, the old men and little boys. Scores of oxcarts were gathered, and in the early dawn as they passed the squeaking of their wheels left memories that make the blood freeze even now. Thousands of women and children were swept away. Where? Nowhere. No destination was stated or intended. Why? Simply because they were Armenians and Christians and were in the hands of the Turks." |
| Aage Meyer Benedictsen Danish | Ethnographer, historian, and Christian missionary Aage Meyer Benedictsen, who visited the Ottoman Empire and witnessed the conditions of the Armenians, organized a relief effort from Denmark for the Armenians in the Ottoman Empire. Among his supporters was Karen Jeppe, who will eventually participate in relief efforts herself for the victims and particularly the orphans. Benedictsen was informed about the events and had made appeals to stop the massacres while openly accusing Ottoman officials for the events. Benedictsen in 1925 wrote "Armenia: A People's Life and Struggle for Two Millennia" (Armenien: Et Folks Liv og Kamp gennem to Aartusinder). | Regarding the massacres, Benedictsen wrote that it was a "shattering crime, probably the largest in the history of the world: The attempt, planned and executed in cold blood, to murder a whole people, the Armenian, during the World War." |
| Ruth A. Parmelee American | Christian missionary During the Armenian genocide, Parmelee was stationed in Kharpert where she continued to conduct her missionary activities. She is believed to be the only physician in the town. She learned Armenian and Turkish and taught at the local Euphrates College. Therefore, she was often preoccupied with caring of those suffering from the events. In the beginning stages of the Armenian genocide, Parmelee recounts the initial arrests of the Armenian intellectuals of the town. Parmelee later writes that other groups of influential men were "bound together, taken out by night under strong guard to a desolate spot and massacred by their guards." After the end of World War I, Parmelee went to the United States. She then returned to the Ottoman Empire to help the relief efforts of the refugees for the American Women's Hospitals Service (AWH). | "The most authentic news that we had of the slaughter of a company of men sent out from prison was brought by our own druggist. His group of 800 men had been taken out not many hours from Harput, bound together in groups of four, and under strong guard. This man (Melkon Lulejian, brother of Professor Donabed Garabed Lulejian) found himself cut loose from his bonds, and escaped from the midst of the killing. His companions who were not able like himself, were being deliberately killed by their own guards." "It is too harrowing to try to describe the outrages committed day by day for weeks, on these thousands of deportees along the road, then for most of them to be killed outright-perhaps by drowning in a river or to drop dead from hunger, thirst, and fatigue." |
| Elizabeth Barrows Ussher American | Christian missionary During the Armenian genocide, Elizabeth Ussher was stationed in Van when the Van Resistance took place. Throughout the time, Ussher wrote about the events by making daily notes of them through entries in her diary. Once the resistance began, Barrows stated that "although the Vali calls it a rebellion, it is really an effort to protect the lives and the homes of the Armenians." She had also reported that a campaign of burning Armenian residences and households throughout various parts of area was initiated. Barrows described the atrocities against the Armenians as a "systematic and wholesale massacre." In the same diary entry, on 5 May, Ussher added that "it has been more than two weeks since fighting began in the city, and the Armenians have the advantage. By this you see that the Vali has not succeeded in his diabolical purpose to wipe them out in three days." However, Ussher also notes that "many of the Turkish soldiers are averse to this butchery" adding that "the Vali has promised plunder and glory to the lawless Kurds, who are nothing loath to do his will." In the same entry, she describes how forty women and children who were "dying or wounded from Turkish bullets" had been brought to their hospital to be cared for. In the meantime, Ussher describes how the Varak Armenian monastery, a refuge for some 2000 people, was burnt and destroyed by the Turkish authorities. | "There is a strong resistance made in the city, for it is expected that the Russians will soon come to our assistance. But in the defenceless villages the story is very different. There the tragedy is too awful to be described. It is nothing but systematic and wholesale massacre. There is first the killing, and then the taking of prisoners, and sending them to the head of the Armenians to be fed. In this way it is expected that starvation will finish the slaughter. It is now evident that there was a well-laid plan to wipe out all the villages of the vilayet, and then crush the city rebels." "Many of the Turkish soldiers are averse to this butchery; so the Vali has promised plunder and glory to the lawless Kurds, who are nothing loath to do his will. One morning forty women and children, dying or wounded from Turkish bullets, were brought to our hospital. Little ones crying pitifully for their mothers who had been killed while fleeing, and mothers mourning for their children whom they have been obliged to leave behind on the plains." "Reports come to us of the burning of village after village, with outrages upon the women and children, and the shooting of the men. At night we could see the light of fire at Artemid, our summer home on the lake, about ten miles away, and at other villages. We learned later that our caretaker at Artemid had been killed, and that his wife had her hand cut off in trying to save him." |
| Clarence Ussher American | Physician and Christian missionary Clarence Ussher's accounts of the Armenian genocide is considered one of the most detailed in the English language. In the beginning stages of the Armenian genocide, Ussher was stationed in the American hospital in Van. During that time, Cevdet Bey, the governor or Vali of the Van vilayet and brother-in-law of Enver Pasha, started confiscating the weapons from the Armenians. With such weapons confiscated, Ussher reported that Cevdet Bey initiated a "reign of terror" campaign by arresting, torturing, and ultimately killing the Armenian population in the region. Cevdet Bey then demanded four thousand Armenians to take part of in labor battalions which often resulted in the massacre of the laborers. When the Armenians refused to send such an amount and amid further "rumors of massacre," Ussher intervened by negotiating with Cevdet Bey. During the conversation with Cevdet Bey, Ussher witnessed the colonel of Cevdet Beys regiment called the "Butcher Regiment" (Turkish: Kasab Tabouri) receive orders to massacre the Armenian population. After the order was given, the Butcher Regiment went on to destroy six villages and massacre its inhabitants. Ussher was reluctant to describe the further details of the massacre by saying "I forbear to describe the wounds brought to me to repair." He then reported that as a result of the massacres, 50,000 Armenians were killed in the province. In 1917, Ussher published a memoir about his experiences in Van, entitled An American Physician in Turkey: A Narrative of Adventures in Peace and War. | "Monday the Vali's attitude seemed changed. He was more quiet and urged the Armenians to return to their deserted shops in the market-place, assuring them that there would be no further molestation of Christians. Little did they know that throughout the province at that very house thousands of defenseless men, women, and children were being slaughtered with the utmost brutality. Turkish soldiers had been quartered in every Armenian village with instructions to begin at a certain hour. The general order read: "The Armenians must be exterminated. If any Muslim protect a Christian, first, his house shall be burned; then the Christian killed before his eyes, and then his [the Moslem's] family and himself." "Wild rumors of massacre taking place somewhere, and of the murder of Ishkhan and his companions, were disturbing the Armenians, and I went to the Vali to see if there was any way of quieting the apprehensions of the people. While I was in his office the colonel of the Valis Regiment, which he called his Kasab Tabouri, or Butcher Regiment, composed of Turkish convicts, entered and said, "You sent for me." "Yes," replied Jevdet; "go to Shadakh and wipe out its people." And turning to me he said savagely, "I won't leave one, not one so high," holding his hand below the height of his knee." "It is the Turkish Government, not the Turkish people, that has done all this. The Government has tried to deceive its Mohammedan subjects and arouse their hatred against the Christians. Jevdet Bey reported the Van Armenians as in rebellion. The fifty-five thousand slaughtered Armenians in that province were reported as fifty-five thousand Mohammedans massacred by Christians. He described in revolting detail actual atrocities, -women and children, ranging from six years to eighty, outraged and mutilated to death,-but made one diabolical change in his description: he said these women were Moslems thus treated by Christians." |
| Ernest Yarrow American | Christian missionary and director of the Near East Foundation In an issue of the New York Times, Yarrow described the massacres against the Armenians in the Van province as an "organized, systematic attempt to wipe out the Armenians." He concluded that "the Turks and Kurds have declared a holy war on the Armenians and have vowed to exterminate them." During the defense of Van, Yarrow had helped the Armenians become more organized, strengthening their chances of resistance. He helped the Armenians create a central committee which voiced the affairs of the Armenians. He helped the Armenians organize a semblance of government agencies such as judges, police, mayor, and board of health. He also reopened bakeries, ovens, and mills to provide provisions and food to the starving Armenian refugees. Hospitals and soup kitchens were also opened by him in order to provide shelter and care for the wounded and sick Armenians. Yarrow remarked about how the Armenians provided relief regardless of race and religion by saying, "I am amazed at the self-control of the Armenians, for though the Turks did not spare a single wounded Armenian, the Armenians are helping us to save the Turks-a thing that I do not believe even Europeans would do." | "We know that if the Turks once got into the city there would be not a whole soul left. It isn't war that the Turks carry on. It is nothing but butchering. The Turkish atrocities have not been exaggerated. From 500,000 to 1,000,000 Armenians and Syrians [Assyrians] were slaughtered in a year." "While the siege was going on the Turks killed every Armenian that they could find in the vicinity of the city. In most cases also every woman that was found outside the walls was killed. Even little children who came in the hands of the Turks were put to death." Yarrow also notes how the Turkish soldiers shot at the fleeing refugees: "In one locality the Turkish advance guard, secluded in the hills, poured rifle shots down upon the fleeing people. Hundreds of them were killed by the firing." |
| Grace Knapp American | Christian missionary Born to missionary parents in Bitlis, Grace Knapp was a Christian missionary and teacher who served in the Ottoman Empire. At the time of the genocide, Knapp was stationed in Van where she witnessed the Van Resistance. She related her accounts of the events in two published books. The first book, The mission at Van in Turkey in war time, describes in detail the incidents that unfolded during the conflict and the massacres committed against the Armenians by Turkish soldiers during the resistance. Her second book, The Tragedy of Bitlis, relates the narratives of two nurses who witnessed massacres against the Armenian population in Bitlis. In the preface of her book, Knapp states that these accounts were word for word narratives from nurses Grisell Mclaren and Miss Shane. The Tragedy of Bitlis is one of the few written accounts of massacres in Bitlis. | "While he [Cevdet Bey] was having no work and much fun his soldiers and their wild allies, the Kurds, were sweeping the countryside, massacring men, women, and children and burning their homes. Babies were shot in their mothers' arms, small children were horribly mutilated, women were stripped and beaten." "He [Cevdet Bey] would first punish Shadakh, then attend to Van, but if the rebels fired one shot meanwhile he would put to death every man, woman and child of the Christians." "The police seemed to have gone mad in their thirst for Armenian blood. ... The screams of women and children could be heard at almost any time during the day. The cries that rang out through the darkness of the night were even more heartrending." |
| Floyd Olin Smith American | Physician and Christian missionary Floyd Olin Smith was an American doctor who served in the Ottoman Empire (1913–1917) under Near East Relief. While in the Ottoman Empire, Floyd Smith was a caretaker of many Armenian genocide victims in Diyarbakir. Smith received many patients from throughout the province of Diyarbakir, who suffered from deportations, torture, and massacre. He compiled a list of all the patients he treated and provided details concerning each patient. In one such instance, on 21 May 1915, Smith received a group of twenty patients who escaped the massacres of Karabash, a village near Diyarbakir. The village had a population of about seven-hundred people, and consisted of a mixed population of Armenians and Assyrians. Dr. Smith reported that these patients suffered from bullet wounds, severed wrists, attempted decapitations, and sword and knife cuts. Dr. Floyd Smith also had under his treatment many Armenians who were tortured and beaten. He reports that one of the more common torture techniques was the bastinado, which involves the beating the soles of a person's bare feet. One such patient, considered a "prominent Armenian", underwent seven-hundred lashes to the soles of his feet. The man received heavy swelling around his feet and his skin, which had already contained numerous blisters, was visibly broken. Smith also treated an Armenian woman who was beaten in prison and had several bruises on her legs and arms. Branded as an agent who worked for an Armenian insurrection, Dr. Smith was expelled from Diyarbakir on 23 June 1915. | "May 21, 1915, there came to our compound in Diarbekir from the village of Karabash, three hours to the east, three or four wounded and the following day (May 22) over a score of wounded Armenian and Syrian women and children. (They, the villagers, told of a night attack by the Kurds three days previous and that the next morning the government had sent gendarmes who refused to allow anyone to come to Diarbekir. Some managed to get away and finally all who could walk or be carried came on the dates mentioned.) The wounds were practically all infected and I have classified them as follows: (a) Inside wounds (probably from swords and knives) of the scalp, face, neck, shoulders, back, extremities. (b) Perforating bullet wounds of the extremities. (c) Wounds made by heavy cutting instruments, probably axes." "Diyarbakir is an interior province with extremely few foreigners—an ideal setup to find out how to solve the Troublesome Armenian problem: Massacre and Deportation, or both combined. Talaat, Enver, and Jemal were fiends from hell itself." "The vali was superseded early in March. By getting a large force of police and gendarmes the new vali [Reshid] succeeded in apprehending the larger part of these men. He soon started the imprisonment of prominent Armenians using as justification the false statement that they were sheltering deserters. Most people had weapons in their houses in remembrance of the event of twenty years ago, but I feel positive that there was no idea of a general uprising. About the first of April a proclamation was posted demanding arms. Men were imprisoned right and left and tortured to make them confess the presence and place of concealments of arms. Some went mad under the torture." "It was reported during the spring of 1915 that men were beaten and tortured and sometimes killed in prison to extract confessions. Bastinado of the feet held in stocks was said to be of common occurrence." |
| Mary Louise Graffam American | Christian missionary Mary Louise Graffam was an American teacher, high school principal, Christian missionary, and an important eyewitness to the Armenian genocide. During the Armenian genocide, she was deported along with the local Armenians and is considered a victim of the Armenian genocide. After the Ottoman government cut off diplomatic ties with the American government due to America's involvement in World War I, Mary Louise Graffam was one of the few Christian Missionaries to remain in Sivas. Prior to the start of the Armenian genocide, she was entrusted to hide and bury financial records and jewelry that Armenians had given her for safekeeping and to transfer valuable goods to safer locations. At the start of the Armenian genocide, however, Graffam was deported along with her students on 7 July 1915 with a convoy consisting of 2,000 Armenians. The gendarmes who were assigned to protect the convoy gave guns and ammunition to local Kurdish groups who eventually robbed the deportees and abducted some of the girls. Some Kurdish groups were throwing stones at the Armenian deportees. While marching, she saw deportees shot dead when attempting to drink water from a nearby river. She had also received reports that there was a "valley of corpses". Mary Graffam wrote an account of her experiences in 1919, titling it her "Own Story." | When arrests of all able-bodied Armenian males begun, Graffam wrote: "The Turks told us that if the men were not given up, the houses would be burned and the families would be hung in front of them." "As soon as the men left us, the Turkish Arabajis [convoy drivers] began to rob the women saying "you are all going to be thrown into the Tokma Su [River], so you might as well give your things to us and then we will stay by you and try to protect you." Every Turkish woman that we met said the same thing. The worst were the gendarmes who really did more or less bad things. One of our school girls was carried off by the Kurds twice but her companions made so much fuss that she was brought back." "When we approached the bridge over Tokma Su it was a certainly fearful sight. As far as the eye could see over the plain was this real slow moving line of oxcarts. For hours not a drop of water on the road and the sun pouring down its very hottest. As we went on we began to see the dead from yesterday's company and the weak began to fall by the way ... I piled as many as I could on our wagons and our pupils both boys and girls, worked like heroes." "Some weeks ago a crowd of Armenian girls who had been in the Turkish orphanage here were told that unless they become wholly Islam and absolutely denied all Armenian relatives and acquaintances that they would be put into the street. Upon that most girls fled to us and are working in our factory." Regarding forgeries of photographs depicting the collection of arms and ammunition from Armenians: "A photographer in Sivas was called to the Government House to photograph the collection of arms, but as they did not make an impressive showing he was asked to return the next day when he noticed that a great many pieces of Turkish ammunition had been added, and his photograph of this last collection was used as official evidence that the Armenians were armed against the Turks." |
| Tacy Atkinson American | Christian missionary Tacy Atkinson was a Christian missionary stationed in Harput and is considered an important eyewitness to the Armenian genocide. During the Armenian genocide, which started in 1915, Atkinson was stationed in the Kharpert where she served as a Christian missionary. Due to her husband Herbert's prestige in the region, Atkinson had immediate access to local governmental agencies and to the deportees themselves. She wrote of much of her experiences in her diary which she kept throughout the time period. However, Atkinson was reluctant to fully describe the events because she feared that the Turkish authorities might uncover her diary. Atkinson makes note that the Turkish government could not have implemented the massacres on its own since it was permissible by the German government as well. However, Tacy Atkinson is most known for helping many Armenians escape massacre. In one instance, she smuggled razor blades into a prison cell so that prisoners can cut the rope when hung. Tacy Atkinson left the diary in a sealed trunk in her home in Turkey when she left the country in 1917, since the Turkish government prohibited anything written be sent out of the country. Nine years later, the unopened trunk was sent to her while she was in the United States of America. In 2000, the diary was republished by the Gomidas Institute. | "We all know such clear-cut, well planned, all well carried out work is not the method of the Turk. The German, the Turk and the devil made a triple alliance not to be equalled in the world for cold blooded hellishness." "What an awful sight. People shoved out of their houses, the doors nailed, and they were piled into oxcarts or on donkeys and many on foot. Police and gendarmes armed, shoving them along. Yesterday a large crowd of women from Kughi arrived but no men. Their men were all killed or in prison and all their girls carried away." "A boy has arrived in Mezreh in a bad state nervously. As I understand it, he was with a crowd of women and children from some village who joined our prisoners and went out June 23. The boy says that in the gorge this side of Bakir Maden the men and women were all shot and the leading men had their heads cut off afterwards. He escaped and came here. His own mother was stripped and robbed and then shot. He says the valley smells so awful that one can hardly pass by now." "Today large crowds have gone from the city. We are told that the people who started Tuesday were taken to Hulakueh only two hours distant. There the men were killed, the girls carried away, and the women robbed and left ... We do not know what is still coming. Large crowds of women and children are coming in today. I don't know where from and those who are here are dying as fast as they can, and are being thrown out unburied. Vultures that are usually so thick everywhere all are absent now. They are all out feasting on dead bodies. The women started out today were followed by a large crowd of Kurds and gendarmes." "We have had women, children and boys come to us bruised, hacked and bleeding. One little girl from Huiloo. She says that women were stripped, then laid two together and their heads cut off. She happened to be the under one and she escaped with a deep cut in the back of her neck and came here. These people I met were put into a church yard for over night. They can't go far. They will be killed close by." |

== See also ==
- Armenian genocide survivors
- Press coverage of the Armenian genocide
- Recognition of the Armenian genocide

== Notes ==
- ^note The list excludes eyewitness accounts and survivor stories of ethnic Armenian victims and is limited to notable accounts of various diplomats, missionaries, politicians, and other notable figures irrespective of their nationality.

== Bibliography ==
- Balakian, Peter (2009). The Burning Tigris. HarperCollins. ISBN 978-0-06-186017-1. - Profile at Google Books
- Barrows, John Otis (1916). In the Land of Ararat: A Sketch of the Life of Mrs. Elizabeth Freeman Barrows Ussher, Missionary to Turkey and a Martyr of the Great War. Fleming H. Revell. [ Alternate copy. ]
- Bryce, James; Neroslavsky, Alexander (2008). The treatment of Armenians in the Ottoman Empire documents presented to Viscount Grey of Fallodon with a preface by Viscount Bryce ([Digsimile der Erstausg.] Hodder and Stoughton, London, 1916. ed.). Frankfurt: Textor-Verlag. ISBN 978-3-938402-15-3.
- Charny, Israel W., ed. (1994). The Widening Circle of Genocide. Genocide: A Critical Bibliographic Review. Vol. 3. New Brunswick and London: Transaction Publishers. ISBN 978-1-56000-172-0.
- Hovannisian, Richard G. (2008). The Armenian genocide cultural and ethical legacies. New Brunswick, NJ: Transaction Publishers. ISBN 978-1-4128-0891-0.
- Winter, J. M. (2003). America and the Armenian Genocide of 1915. Cambridge University Press. ISBN 978-0-511-16382-1.
- Oren, Michael B. (2011). Power, Faith, and Fantasy: America in the Middle East: 1776 to the Present. Transaction Publishers. ISBN 978-0-393-34152-2.
- Riggs, Alice Shepard (1920). Constance Shepard Jolly (ed.). Shepard of Aintab. Princeton, NJ: Gomidas Inst. Books. ISBN 1-903656-05-2.
- Riggs, Henry H. (1996). Days of Tragedy in Armenia: Personal Experiences in Harpoot, 1915–1917. Gomidas Institute. ISBN 1-884630-01-4.
- Barton, James L. (1998). "Turkish atrocities": statements of American missionaries on the destruction of Christian communities in Ottoman Turkey, 1915–1917. Ann Arbor, Mich.: Gomidas Inst. ISBN 1884630049.
- Payaslian, Simon (2005). United States Policy Toward the Armenian Question and the Armenian Genocide. Palgrave Macmillan. ISBN 978-1-4039-7840-0.
- Gaunt, David (2006). Massacres, resistance, protectors: muslim-christian relations in Eastern Anatolia during world war I (1st Gorgias Press ed.). Piscataway, NJ: Gorgias. ISBN 1-59333-301-3.
- Auron, Yair (2000). The Banality of Indifference: Zionism and the Armenian Genocide. Transaction Publishers. ISBN 1-4128-4468-1.
- Kiernan, Ben (2008). Blood and Soil: Modern Genocide 1500–2000. Melbourne University Publishing. ISBN 978-0-522-85477-0.
- Hull, Isabel V. (2005). Absolute Destruction: Military Culture and the Practices of War in Imperial Germany. Cornell University Press. ISBN 0-8014-6708-X.
- Einstein, Lewis (1918). Inside Constantinople: A Diplomatist's Diary During the Dardanelles Expedition, April–September, 1915. E.P. Dutton.
- Forsythe, David P. (2009). Encyclopedia of Human Rights, Volume 1. Oxford University Press. ISBN 978-0-19-533402-9.
- Edip, Halide (2005). Memoirs of Halidé Edib (1st Gorgias Press ed.). Piscataway, NJ: Gorgias Press. ISBN 1-59333-305-6.
- Toriguian, Shavarsh (1988). The Armenian question and international law (2nd ed.). La Verne, Calif., U.S.: ULV Press. ISBN 978-0-911707-13-7.
- Atkinson, Tacy (2000). Michael J. Hagopian (ed.). "The German, the Turk and the devil made a triple alliance": Harpoot diaries, 1908–1917. Princeton, NJ: Gomidas Inst. ISBN 1-903656-00-1.
- Kieser, Hans-Lukas (2010). Nearest East American millennialism and mission to the Middle East. Philadelphia: Temple University Press. ISBN 978-1-4399-0224-0.
- Dressler, Markus (2013). Writing religion: the making of Turkish Alevi İslam. New York: Oxford University Press. ISBN 978-0-19-996940-1.
- Kaiser, Hilmar (2002). At the crossroads of Der Zor: death, survival, and humanitarian resistance in Aleppo, 1915–1917. Taderon Press. ISBN 1-903656-12-5.
- Kévorkian, Raymond H. (2010). The Armenian genocide: a complete history (Reprinted ed.). London: I. B. Tauris. ISBN 978-1-84885-561-8.
- Ussher, Clarence (1917). An American Physician in Turkey: A Narrative of Adventures in Peace and in War. Houghton Mifflin Company.
