= Jakob Künzler =

Swiss humanitarian and witness (1871–1949)

- Born: March 8, 1871; Hundwil, Switzerland
- Died: January 15, 1949 (aged 77); Ghazir, Lebanon
- Resting place: French Protestant Cemetery, Beirut, Lebanon
- Occupation: Doctor
- Known for: witnessing the Armenian genocide
- Notable work: In the Land of Blood and Tears

Jakob Künzler (March 8, 1871 – January 15, 1949) was a Swiss doctor who resided in an oriental mission in Urfa and who witnessed the Armenian genocide.

== Life ==
Born in Hundwil, Switzerland, Künzler worked in the canton Appenzell and made a living as a carpenter. Afterwards he was trained in Basel as an evangelist deacon (Krankenpfleger). In 1899, he traveled to Urfa in Turkey, where he found his own place to work. He continued to study medicine until he became an independent operating surgeon, and later in 1905 he married Elizabeth Bender, daughter of a Christian missionary and granddaughter of an Ethiopian princess.

From 1915 to 1917 Künzler became an eyewitness to the Armenian genocide, the subject of his 1921 book In the Land of Blood and Tears. Despite mortal danger, he helped provide, when he could, for thousands of Armenian orphans and resumed his hospital enterprise in Urfa.

He remained in Turkey, working as a pharmacist serving the sick and wounded, non-Muslims and Muslims alike, in a hospital in Urfa who documented accounts of massacres of various Armenian labor battalion companies.

In October 1922 he closed his hospital he worked in and moved his family to Ghazir, near Beirut, where later he opened a center for orphans. Later he established a settlement for Armenian widows in Beirut and a lung sanatorium in Azounieh.

Jakob Künzler observed in August 1915:

... two Turkish officials who appeared in Urfa. The rumor was that they hurried out in order to drive forward the extermination of the Armenian people with all their might, and they had the sanction of the highest state authority for doing so. They ordered on this basis, scarcely the moment they arrived in Urfa, the killing of all gathered prisoners. 'Why should we feed them any longer?' they said.

Künzler also witnessed the deportations of Kurds, of which he wrote:

No European newspaper has reported that the same Young Turks, who wanted to exterminate the Armenians, drove the Kurds who had been living in Upper Armenia from their house and home. Like the Armenians, the Kurds were accused of being unconfident elements that would join sides with the Russians. The deportation of the Kurds from the regions of Djabachdjur, Palu, Musch and from the Vilajets of Erzerum and Bitlis was carried out in the winter of 1916. About 300,000 Kurds had to wander southwards. First they were placed in Upper Mesopotamia, especially in the region of Ourfa, but also westward from Aintab and Marasch. Then in the summer of 1917, the transport of the Kurds to the Konya Plateau began. [...] The most horrible thing was that the deportations were carried out in the middle of the winter. When the deportees reached a Turkish village in the evening, the inhabitants were afraid and closed the doors of their homes. Thus, the poor Kurds had to stay outside in the rain and snow. The next morning, the villagers had to dig mass graves for those frozen to death. The suffering of the surviving Kurds who finally reached Mesopotamia was far from being over. [...] The winter of 1917/18 brought new hardship. Despite a good harvest, almost all of the deported Kurds fell victim to a terrible famine.

He died on January 15, 1949 in Ghazir, Lebanon. He was buried and remains interred in the French Protestant Cemetery of Beirut.

== Prizes and honors ==
- 1947 award by the University of Basel
- 1959 memorial in Hundwil
- 1971 earnings/service medals of the Lebanese government
- 1971 memorial in Hundwil and Walzenhausen, Switzerland

== Literature ==
- 1929: In the Land of Blood and Tears
- 1959: Jakob, the Resource in the Service of Life

== See also ==
- Witnesses and testimonies of the Armenian genocide
