= Ruth A. Parmelee =

American Christian missionary and Armenian Genocide witness

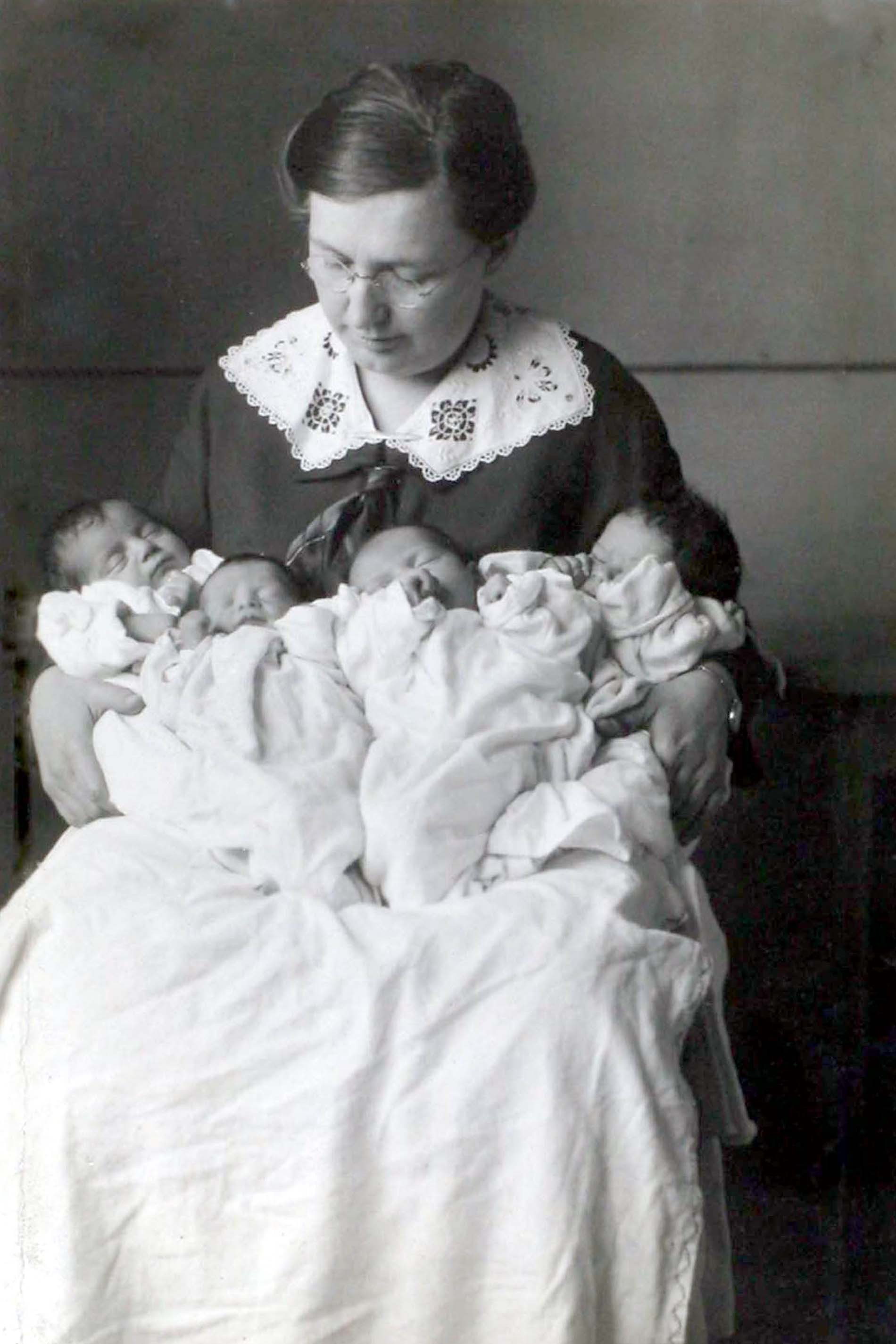
- Born: Ruth Azneve Parmelee; 3 April 1885; Trabzon, Trebizond Vilayet, Ottoman Empire
- Died: 15 December 1973 (aged 88); Concord, New Hampshire, United States
- Occupations: Christian missionary and witness to the Armenian genocide

Ruth Azneve Parmelee (3 April 1885 – 15 December 1973) was a Christian missionary and a witness to the Armenian genocide. She served as a nurse of the American Women's Hospitals Service to a local hospital in Kharpert. She was also instrumental in the founding in 1922 of the hospital of the American Women's Hospitals Service in Salonika, Greece.

== Early life ==
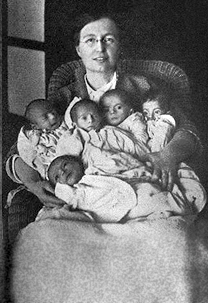
Ruth A. Parmelee with Armenian children

Ruth A. Parmelee was born in Trabzon, Trebizond Vilayet, Ottoman Empire, on 3 April 1885, to parents who served as missionaries in the region. She received her early education from her parents until she was eleven, when the family moved to the United States. She attended Oberlin High School in Oberlin, Ohio, and then continued her education at Oberlin College, where in 1907 she graduated with a B.A. degree. She next attended the University of Illinois, where she graduated with a medical degree. Thereafter, she went to Philadelphia and interned at the Philadelphia Women's Hospital to practice nursing. In 1914 she went to Kharpert (today Harput) to serve as a missionary for the American Board of Commissioners for Foreign Missions. She learned Armenian and Turkish and taught at the local Euphrates College.

== Armenian genocide witness ==
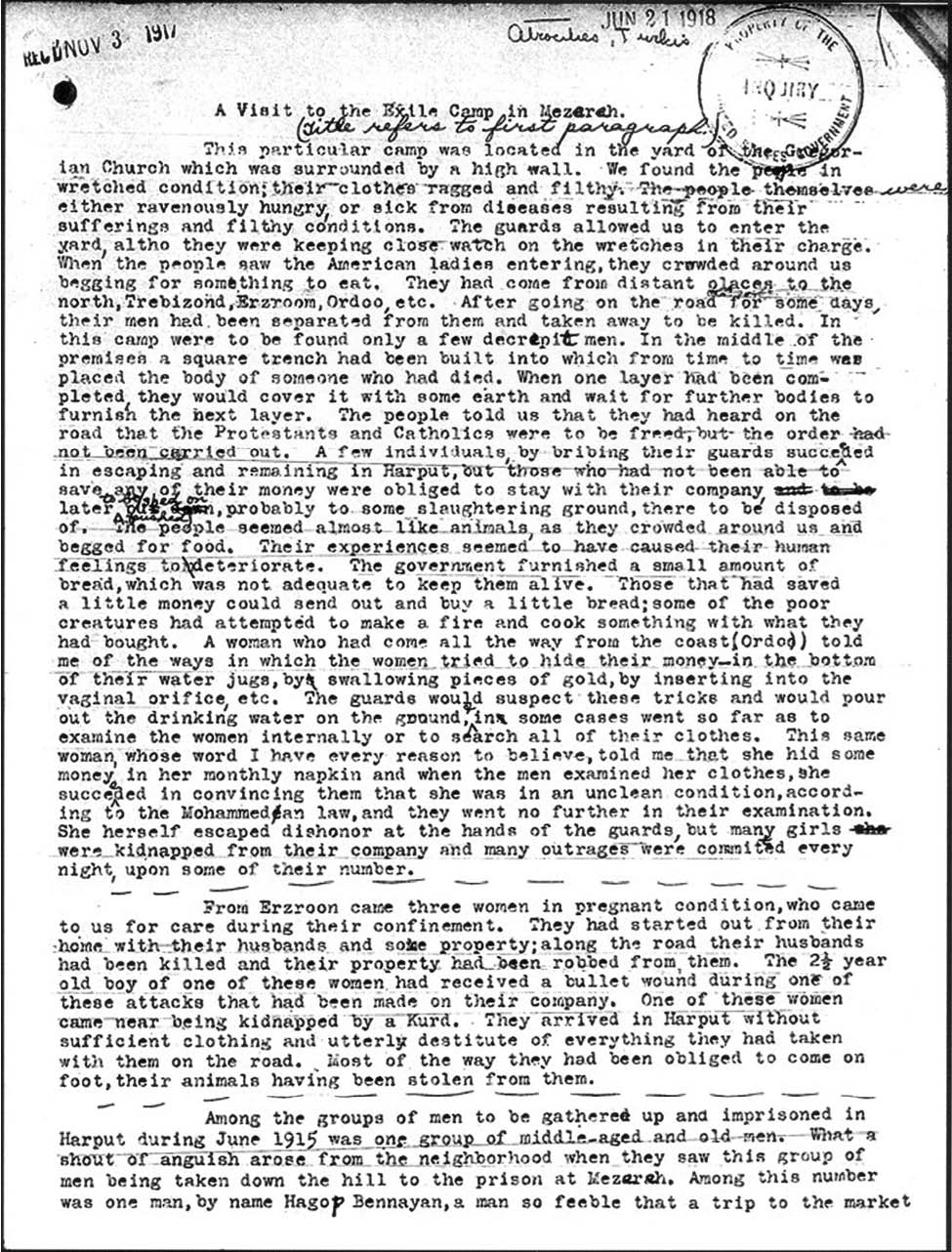
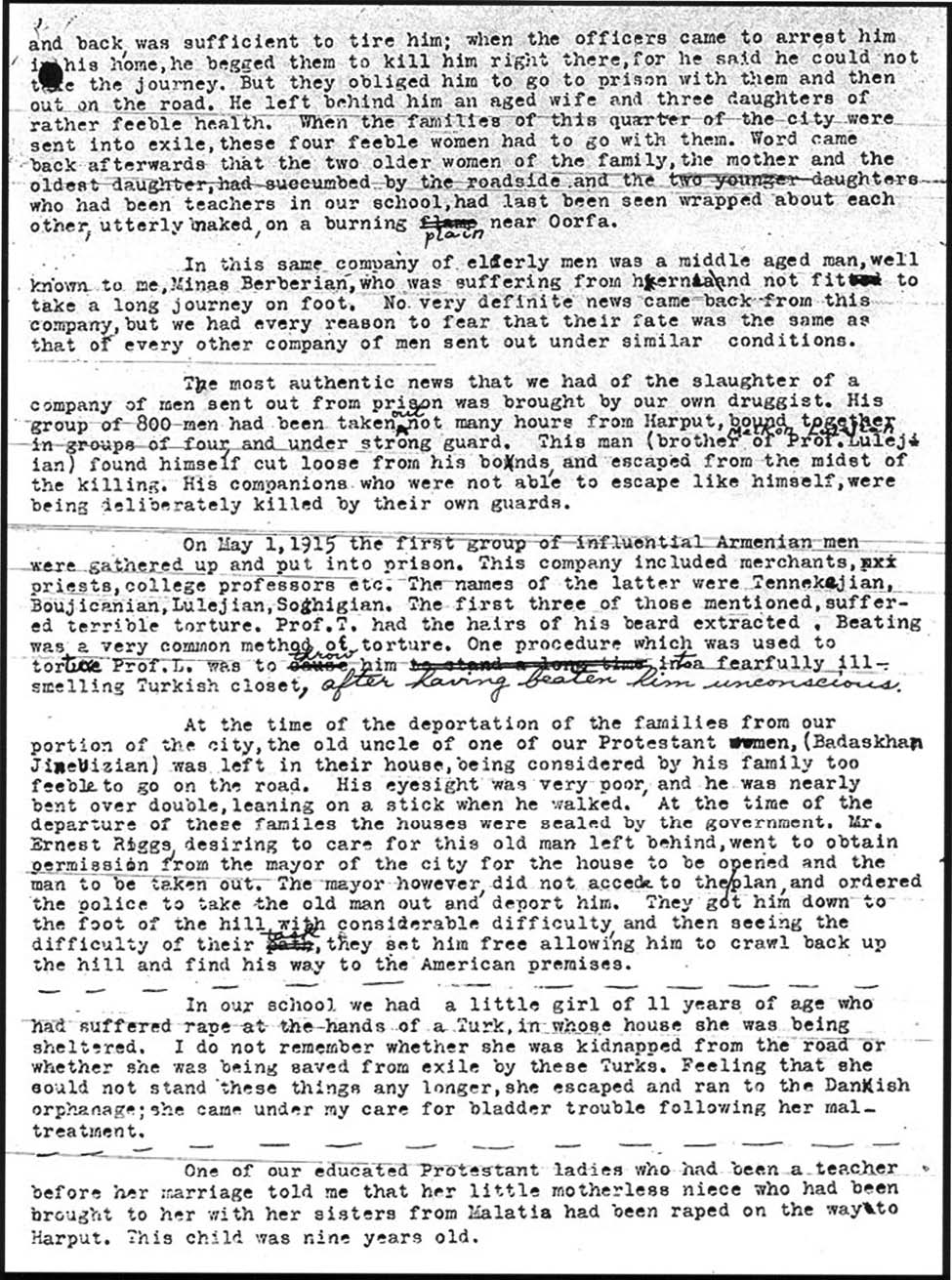
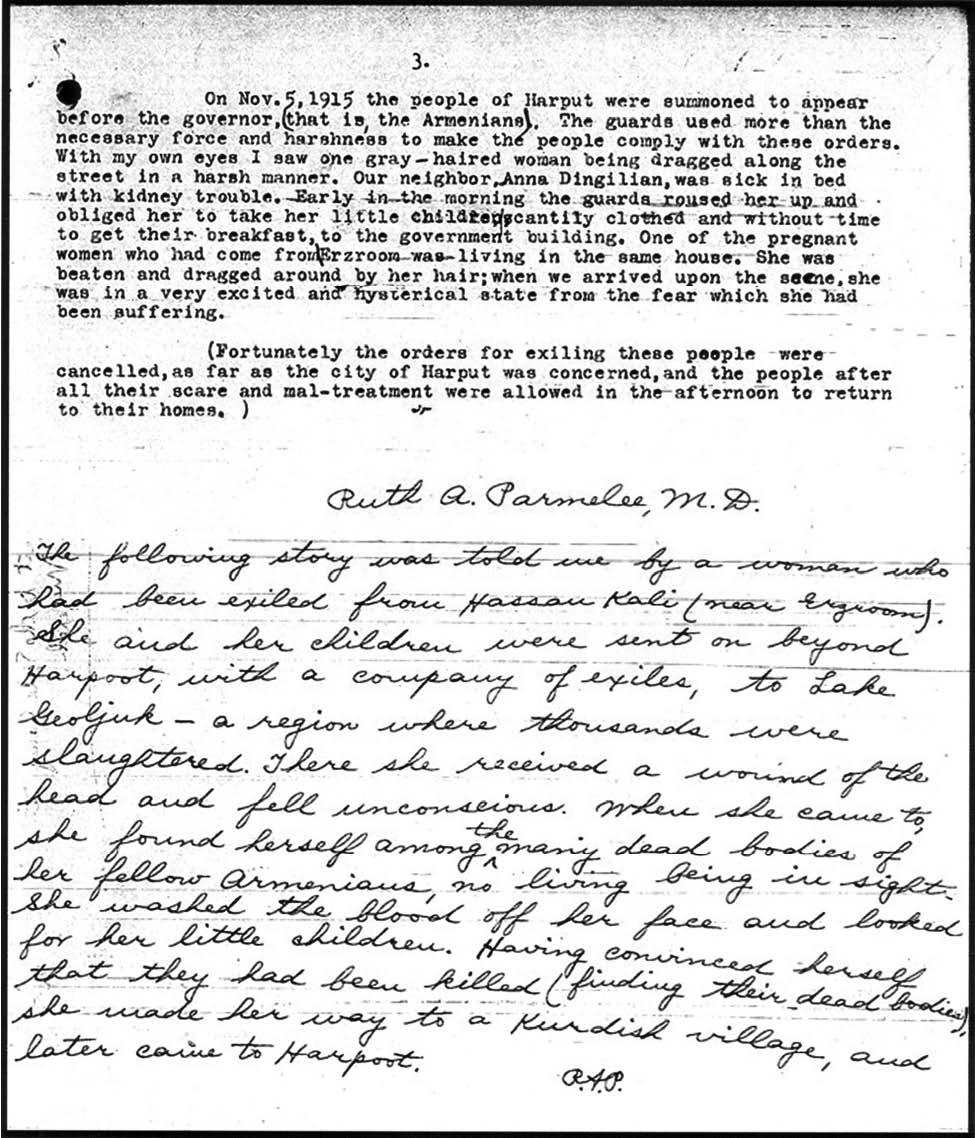
The original documentation as provided by Ruth A. Parmelee and published by James L. Barton in Turkish Atrocities: Statements of American Missionaries on the Destruction of Christian Communities in Ottoman Turkey, 1915–1917

=== Background ===
Having lost its Christian-majority Balkan possessions in the Balkan Wars, fears had intensified within the ranks of the Ottoman government that a similar push for independence by the Armenians—Turkey's largest remaining Christian minority, situated in the heart of Anatolia—might lead to the breakup of Turkey itself. Aware of the Ottomans' growing hostility, some Armenians, particularly in the Vilayet of Van, had begun stockpiling weapons and ammunition for self-defence, fearing a repetition of the massacres of 1905, but these activities only strengthened Ottoman suspicions of Armenian intentions.

Following the outbreak of World War I, mutual distrust between Turks and Armenians reached almost intolerable levels when, in early 1915, Turkey was invaded both by the British at Gallipoli and Russia from the east. The Russian thrust into Van Vilayet, spearheaded by Russo-Armenian units, was quickly blamed by the Ottoman leadership on alleged collaboration by the Van Armenians, and extreme measures against the mostly defenceless Armenian populace were authorized, resulting in massacres, the siege of Van, and eventually, the Armenian genocide.

=== Witness to the Armenian genocide ===
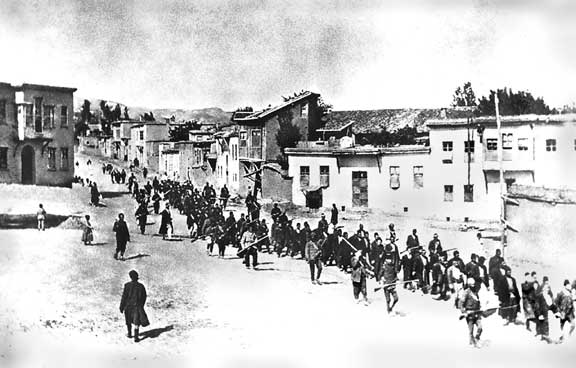
Armenian civilians, escorted by armed Ottoman soldiers, are marched through Harput (Kharpert), to a prison in the nearby Mezireh (present-day Elazığ), April 1915.

During the Armenian genocide, Parmelee was stationed in Kharpert where she continued to conduct her missionary activities. She is believed to have been the only physician in the town. Therefore, she was often preoccupied with caring of those suffering from the events. In the beginning stages of the Armenian genocide, Parmelee recounts the initial arrests of the Armenian intellectuals of the town:

On May 1, 1915 the first group of influential Armenian men were gathered up and put into prison. This company included merchants, priests, college professors etc. The names of the latter were Tennekejian, Boujancanian, Lulejian, Soghigian. The first three of those mentioned, suffered terrible torture. One procedure which was used to torture Professor Lulejian was to throw him into a fearfully ill-smelling Turkish closet, after having beaten him unconscious.

Parmelee later writes that other groups of influential men were "bound together, taken out by night under strong guard to a desolate spot and massacred by their guards."

In addition to these eyewitness accounts scholars note that Parmelee's role during 1915 was far more extensive than the current article reflects. Referring to Piana (2026), Parmelee's gender shaped the spaces she worked in. She treated Armenian and Muslim women inside private homes along with running a maternity and children's clinic out of her own home and used to move between multiple locations like refugee camps, hospitals, and mission buildings.

As the genocide developed, Parmelee decided to change from her original assignment to emergency medical care. She treated Armenian women who were deported and children that were in those same deportation routes. She helped people who were suffering from starvation, disease, etc. Her position as the only available physician in Harpoon put her in the center of all of the humanitarian and medical work during these deportations.

Her writings in "A Pioneer in the Euphrates Valley" also documented how she navigated through the Ottoman restrictions, not having many supplies, and the collapse of the local medical structure. Piana (2015) highlighted Parmelee's word during this time and showed that missionary women challenged gender expectations while performing during critical moments in a war zone.

She then adds:

Among the groups of men to be gathered up and imprisoned in Harput during June 1915 was one group of middle-aged and old men. What a shout of anguish arose from the neighborhood when they saw this group of men being taken down the hill to the prison at Mezereh. Among this number was one man, by name of Hagop Benneyan, a man so feeble that a trip to the market and back was sufficient to tire him; when the officers came to arrest him in his home, he begged them to kill him right there, for he said he could not take the journey. But they obliged him to go to prison with them and then out on the road. He left behind an aged wife and three daughters of rather feeble health. When the families of this quarter of the city were sent into exile, these four feeble women had to go with them. Word came back afterwards the two older women of the family, the mother and the oldest daughter, had succumbed by the roadside and the two younger daughters who had been teachers in our school, had been seen wrapped about each other, utterly naked, on a burning plain near Oorfa.

Parmelee continued to describe the eventual massacre of groups of men from the town:

The most authentic news that we had of the slaughter of a company of men sent out from prison was brought by our own druggist. His group of 800 men had been taken out not many hours from Harput, bound together in groups of four, and under strong guard. This man (Melkon Lulejian, brother of Professor Donabed Garabed Lulejian) found himself cut loose from his bonds, and escaped from the midst of the killing. His companions who were not able like himself, were being deliberately killed by their own guards.

While the male population was being imprisoned, the deportations for the town was already underway. The deportees consisted mostly of women and children. Parmelee described the conditions of the deportees:

It is too harrowing to try to describe the outrages committed day by day for weeks, on these thousands of deportees along the road, then for most of them to be killed outright-perhaps by drowning in a river or to drop dead from hunger, thirst, and fatigue.

=== Diary entries ===
Ruth continued to detail her life as a nurse on the frontlines in her diary. Her diary journals her experience between 1913-1916, including her preparation for her trip to Harput and time there. Not only does she provide eyewitness accounts to the genocide, but also to the Eastern front of World War I. Her personal journal entries denote her own experience suffering typhus, how she treated Turkish and Armenian patients in the area, and includes anecdotes about learning both the Armenian and Turkish language. This diary also holds a wealth of cultural insight in Harput. Parmelee describes things like Armenian Christmas on January 19, 1916, and other cultural encounters:

Mother & I attended the women's association of Central Church lunch and missionary meeting. Went home to dinner with Mrs. Abajian-- pilaff, kufties, helve etc. I am learning to talk Turkish! Words come back to me.

== Later life ==
After the end of World War I, Parmelee went to the United States. She then returned to the Ottoman Empire to help out in the relief efforts of the refugees for the American Women's Hospitals Service (AWH). In 1922 she went to Greece where she helped found the AWH hospital in Salonika for the care of Greek refugees of the Greco-Turkish War. She was an instrumental figure in the founding of a nursing school for which she served as the president until 1941. In 1941, she went to the United States, where she remained the rest of her life.

Ruth A. Parmelee died in Concord, New Hampshire, on 15 December 1973.

== Works ==
- Parmelee, Ruth A. (2002) [1967]. A pioneer in the Euphrates Valley. Gomidas Institute. ISBN 978-1-903656-24-2.

== Bibliography ==
- Barton, James L. (1998). "Turkish atrocities" : statements of American missionaries on the destruction of Christian communities in Ottoman Turkey, 1915–1917. Ann Arbor, Mich.: Gomidas Inst. ISBN 1884630049.
- Riggs, Henry H. (1996). Days of Tragedy in Armenia: Personal Experiences in Harpoot, 1915–1917. Gomidas Institute. ISBN 1884630014.
- The History of the Greek Refugee Hospital of the Interwar Period in a General Hospital of Nikaia “Agios Panteleimon” | Cureus
- Piana, F. (2026). Gendered identity and spaces of medical work: Doctor Ruth A. Parmelee in Ottoman Harpoot during the Great War era. Journal of Women’s History, 38(1), 42–61. https://doi.org/10.1353/jowh.2026.a983896 https://ou-primo.hosted.exlibrisgroup.com/permalink/f/7erelc/TN_cdi_proquest_journals_3308228129
- Piana, F. (2015). Dr. Ruth A. Parmelee: Witnessing the Armenian Genocide and (re-)negotiating the self. Fondation Pierre du Bois pour l’histoire du temps présent, Papiers d’actualité, Nº5 (June 2015). (PDF) 2015. Dr. Ruth A. Parmelee: witnessing the Armenian Genocide and (re)negotiating the self.https://www.academia.edu/39709208/2015_Dr_Ruth_A_Parmelee_witnessing_the_Armenian_Genocide_and_re_negotiating_the_self
- Parmelee, R. A. (2002). A Pioneer in the Euphrates Valley. Princeton & London: Gomidas Institute (Taderon Press). A Pioneer in the Euphrates Valley - Ruth A. Parmelee - Google Bookshttps://books.google.com/books?id=3cIlAQAAMAAJ
- Metaxas, V. A. (2012). Dr. Ruth A. Parmelee and the Changing Role of Near East Missionaries in Early Twentieth Century Turkey. The Role of the American Board in the World: Bicentennial Reflections on the Organization's Missionary Work, 1810-2010, 75. https://books.google.com/books?hl=en&lr=&id=FzNNAwAAQBAJ&oi=fnd&pg=PA75&dq=ruth+parmelee+&ots=xnlnQJ2mqr&sig=tg995c3P5zKWsX5OD03Hd9tsPN0#v=onepage&q=ruth%20parmelee&f=false
- The Role of the American Board in the World: Bicentennial Reflections on the ... - Google Books
- Mpakosi, A., Cholevas, V., Tzouvelekis, I., Cholevas, S., Gavrilis, P. R., Katsouda, A., ... & Mironidou-Tzouveleki, M. (2024). The History of the Greek Refugee Hospital of the Interwar Period in a General Hospital of Nikaia “Agios Panteleimon”. Cureus, 16(2). https://www.cureus.com/articles/229756-the-history-of-the-greek-refugee-hospital-of-the-interwar-period-in-a-general-hospital-of-nikaia-agios-panteleimon#!/
- The History of the Greek Refugee Hospital of the Interwar Period in a General Hospital of Nikaia “Agios Panteleimon” | Cureus
