= Education in the Ottoman Empire =

Overview of the education system of the Ottoman Empire

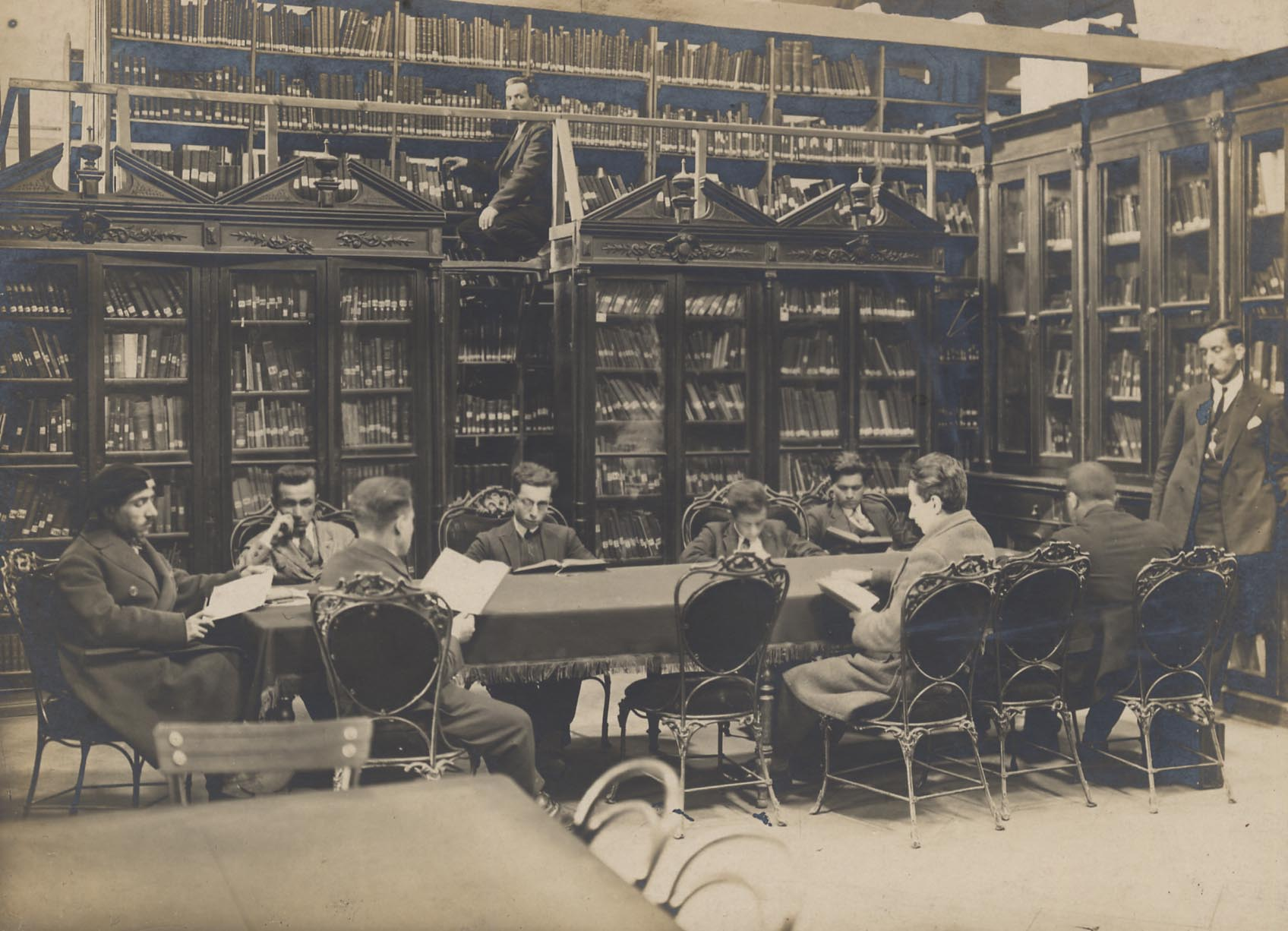
Beyazıt State Library was founded in 1884.

In the Ottoman Empire each, and every millet (religious group) established a schooling system serving its members. Education, therefore, was largely divided on ethnic and religious lines: few non-Muslims attended schools for Muslim students and vice versa. Most institutions that did serve all ethnic and religious groups taught in French or in other languages.

== Education stages ==
Sibyan Schools (Sibyan Mektepleri) formed the primary level of education in the Ottoman Empire. Often attached to mosques and supported through charitable endowments (waqfs) these schools provided instruction in Qur'an recitation, writing, arithmetic, and basic Islamic teachings. For many Ottoman subjects, they represented the only stage of formal education.

== Education of Muslims ==
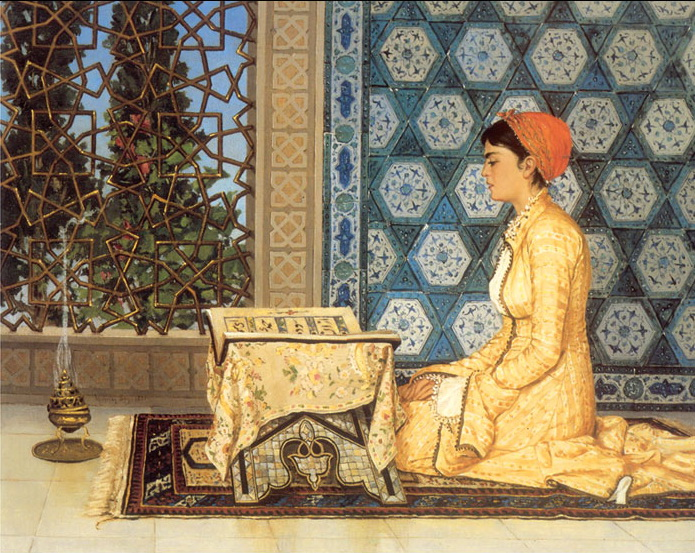
Girl Reciting the Qurān (Kuran Okuyan Kız), an 1880 painting by the Ottoman polymath Osman Hamdi Bey, whose works often showed women engaged in educational activities.

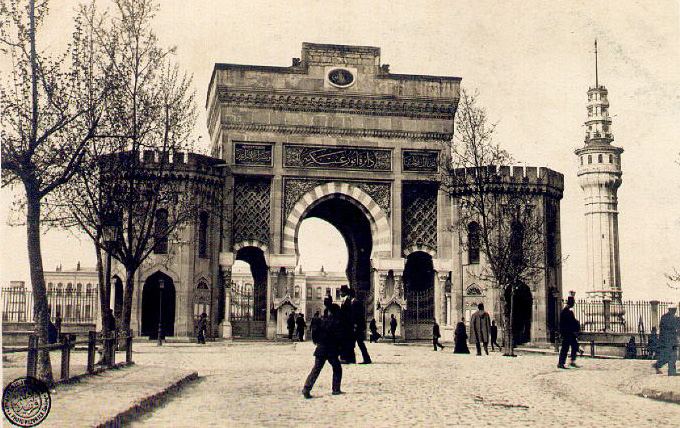
Istanbul University is the oldest university in Turkey. In Ottoman times Western sources called it the "University of Constantinople".

The Ottoman Empire had traditional Islamic-style schooling. The primary schools were mekteps and secondary schools were medreses. Many such schools were within mosques; accordingly the operators of the mosques served as the headmasters of the mekteps.

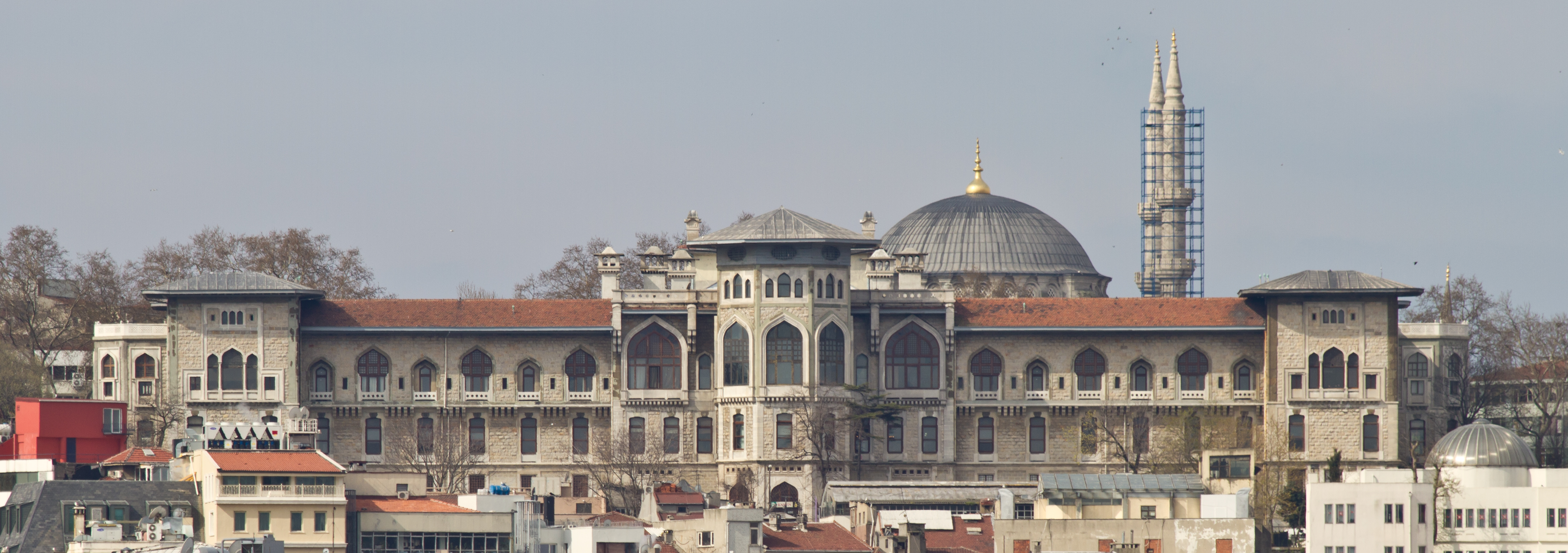
Istanbul High School (Istanbul Erkek Lisesi in Turkish) was founded in 1886.

Mekteps were coeducational and often charged a nominal fee, although some provided free meals and clothing. Lucy Garnett stated in the 1904 book Turkish Life in Town and Country that even though introductory reading and writing units had been recently introduced, "instruction given in [the schools] is chiefly of a religious character". According to Garnett, due to the early establishments of the mekteps and their social welfare programmes, "There is perhaps no country in Europe in which primary education was provided for at so early a date as in Turkey, or so many inducements held out to poor parents to allow their children to participate in its benefits".

Medreses historically were funded by sultans, and language and Islamic courses formed the curriculum. The first Ottoman medresa was established at Iznik by Orhan Gazi shortly after the city's conquest in 1330-1331. Early Ottoman medreses developed from existing Seljuk educational traditions, while also drawing scholars from major Islamic centers such as Egypt, Syria, Iran and Turkestan. By the mid-fifteenth century, medreses had become established in major Ottoman cities including Bursa, and Edirne. The graduates of medreses served as the educated classes and worked in government and religious services. In 1904 each provincial town had at least one medrese and Istanbul had over 100 of them. According to Garnett, the medreses "resemble in some respects the universities of Western Europe as they existed in medieval days". Garnett concluded that "it cannot be denied that [the medreses] have done good service in their time" due to the prominent graduates they had. By 1904 the endowments, facilities, and welfare benefits of the medreses were in decline, and their importance was in decline.

In addition, by 1904 the empire had established Western-style schools. Mahmud II created the rüşdiye schools, which admitted boys, were Turkish medium, and which educated students across various Muslim groups; very few non-Muslim students attended the schools and authorities did not make plans to build such schools in areas populated by Arabs. Located in major cities, they were supported by government money. The courses included the geography and history of the empire, reading and writing, and arithmetic. The schools thereafter increased Turkish comprehension of Bosnians and Cretans, and Albanians and Kurds received increased Turkish instruction during the rule of Abdul Hamid II. There were also Turkish-medium schools for children of civil service employees located in Arab cities. The modern-style secondary schools, serving boys and preparing students for western-style secondary/higher education, were called Idadiyeh. Garnett stated that as of 1904 they were "very inadequate in number".

Garnett wrote that elite Turkish boys often studied abroad in France and England, but that elite girls at adolescence rarely did as they would have had to have been accompanied by a female relative or minder and observe harem rules; she stated that governesses from England, France, Germany, and elsewhere in Europe taught girls from the elite while they resided at home.

Garnett stated that the Ottomans were adding more schools for working and middle class Turkish girls but that "equipment" was often not sufficient and there were still not enough of them. For primary schools, the Committee of Union and Progress (CUP) passed a law in 1913 which made primary education mandatory and free of charges in the whole Ottoman Empire, while limiting the class size to lower than fifty students. The aim of the law was to prepare the pupils for secondary education.

== Education of non-Muslims ==
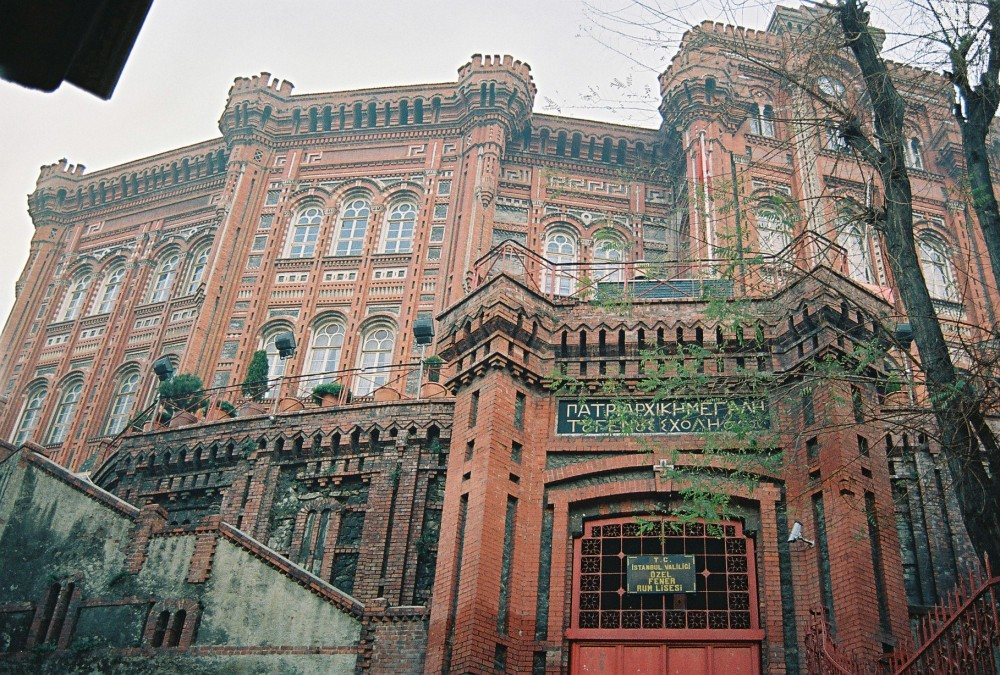
Phanar Greek Orthodox College is a Greek minority school was founded in Ottoman Empire in 1454. It is the oldest surviving and most prestigious Greek Orthodox school in Istanbul, Turkey

Several "foreign schools" (Frerler mektebleri) operated by religious clergy primarily served non-Muslims, although some Muslim students attended.

Johann Strauss, author of "Language and power in the late Ottoman Empire," stated that "a common schooling system" for all religious and ethnic groups never occurred, partly because members of non-Muslim groups resisted learning Turkish, and not due to an inability to learn Turkish; the schools for non-Muslims focused on promotion of ethnic languages.

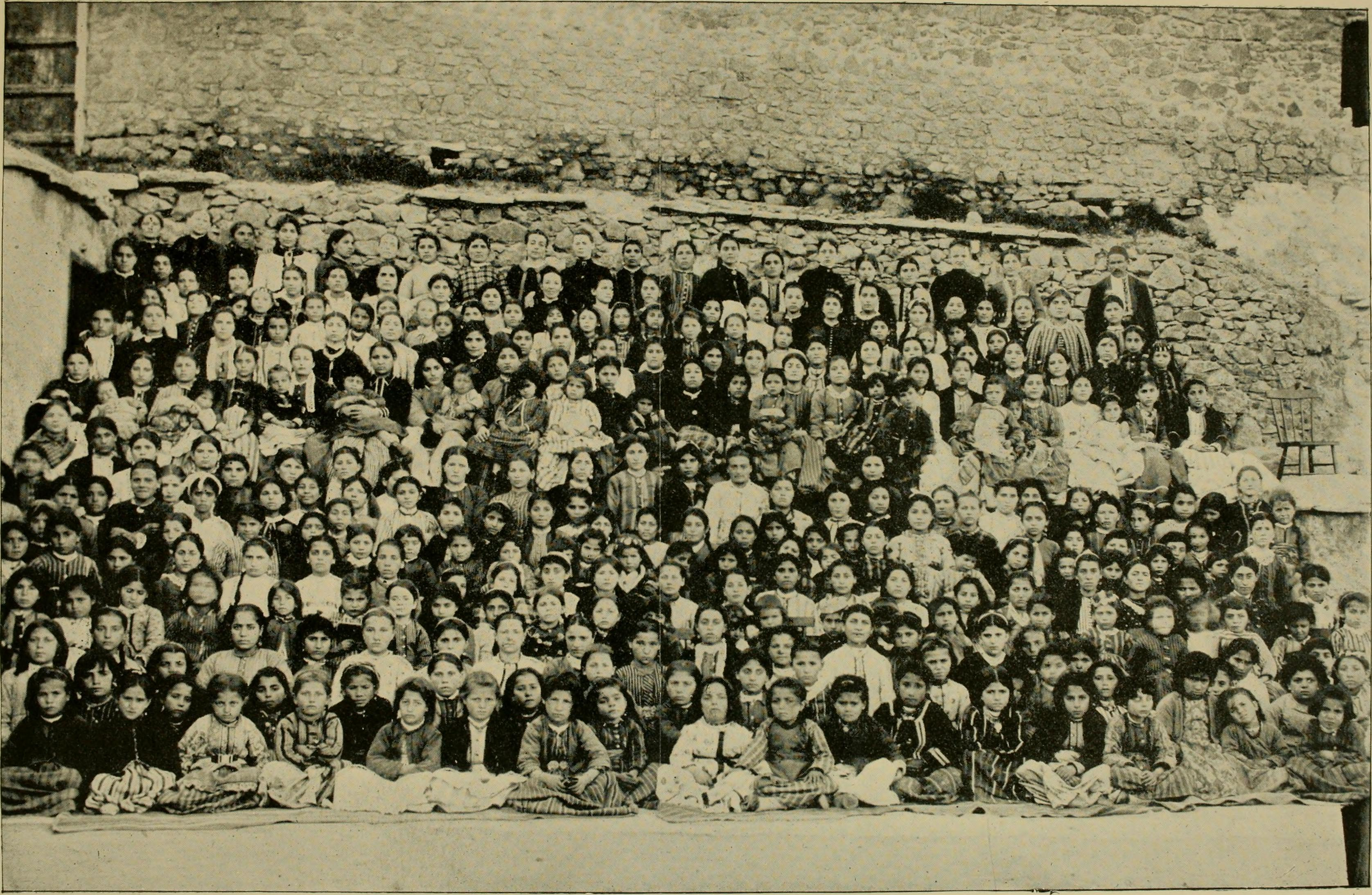
Girls in the Euphrates College of Kharpoot (1873)

Garnett described the schools for Christians and Jews as "organised upon European models", with donations supporting their operation and most of them being "well attended" and with "a high standard of education".

== School statistics ==
The U.S. Commissioner of Education published a report stating that in 1908 there were approximately 12,077 schools in the Ottoman Empire. It stated in 1910 there were an estimated 1,331,200 students enrolled in 36,230 schools in the Ottoman Empire; the students were about 5.3% of the total Ottoman population. In regards to the figures the report stated that there "may be an exaggeration, although it is known that schools have multiplied during the past few years, especially in cities and towns."

In 1909, in Istanbul there were 626 primary schools and 12 secondary schools. Of the primary schools, 561 were of the lower grade and 65 were of the higher grade; of the latter, 34 were public and 31 were private. There was one secondary college and eleven secondary preparatory schools.

== Tertiary education ==
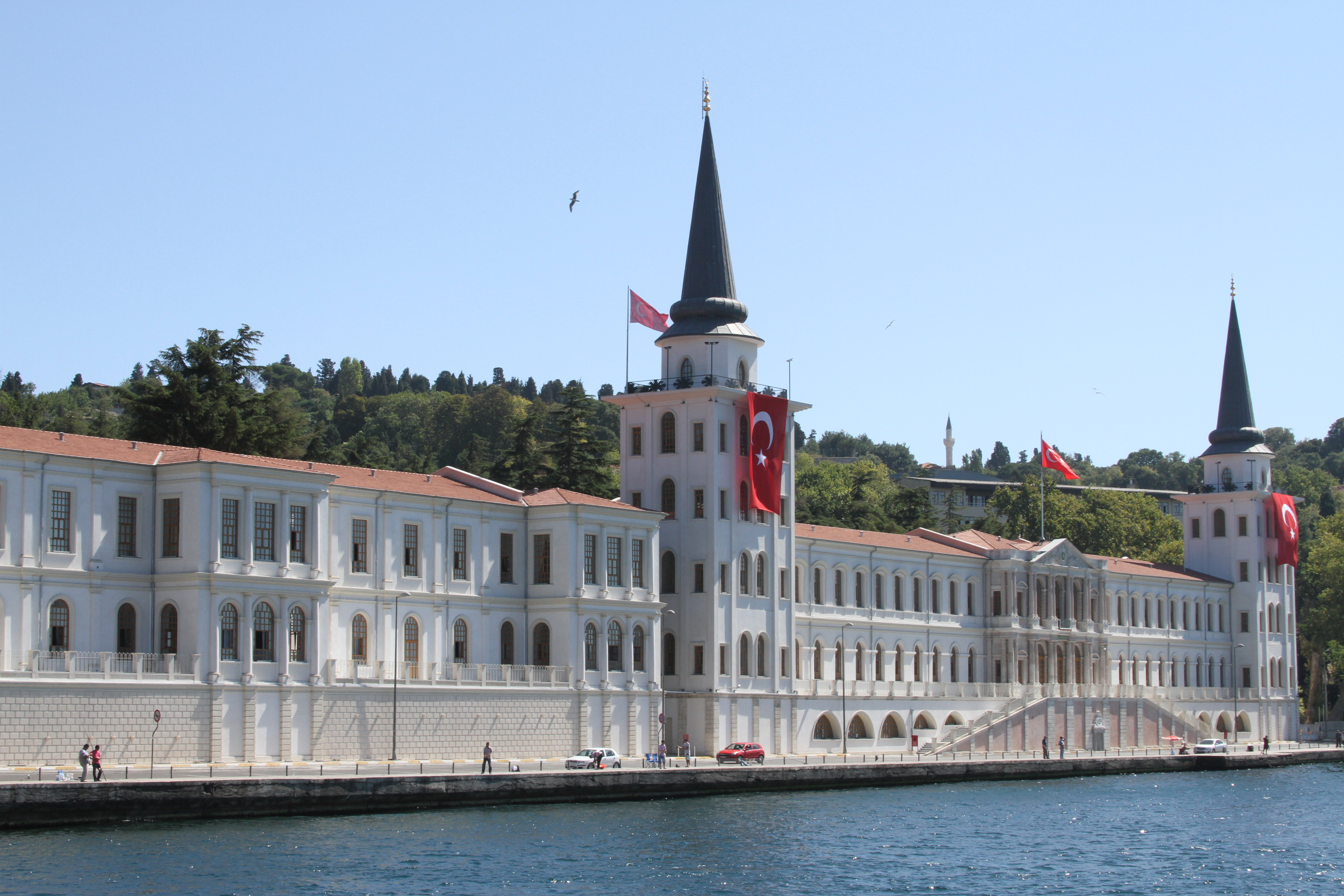
Kuleli Military High School in Istanbul near the Bosporus.

The late Ottoman Empire modelled its public university system after the Grandes Ecoles of France; it came into being in the late 1800s, with the first institution being the Darülfünun-ı şahane, now Istanbul University. Johann Strauss stated that the Ottoman Empire established its university system later than Austria-Hungary and Russia had.

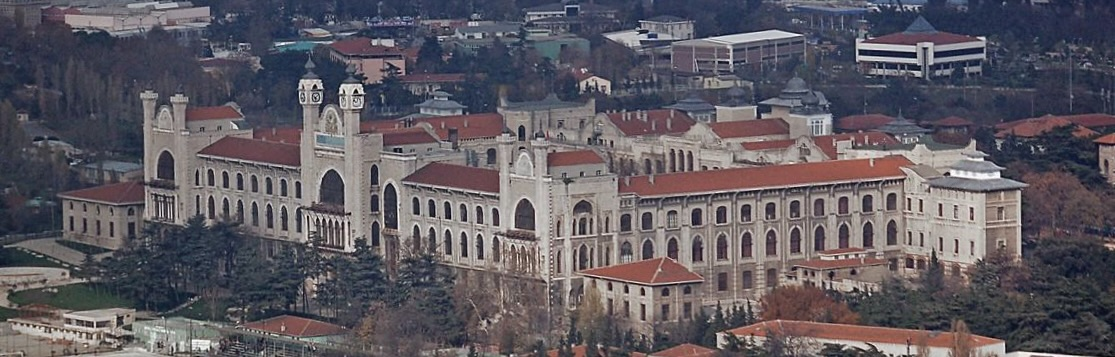
Haydarpaşa campus of Marmara University, originally the Imperial College of Medicine (Mekteb-i Tıbbiye-i Şahane), Istanbul.

In 1827, Sultan Mahmud II established the Imperial School of Medicine, a military medical school. In 1867 the Civilian Medical School began operation, and the two merged into a single medical school in 1909.

Another medical school, which was French-medium, was Beirut's Faculté Française de Médecine de Beyrouth. The Turkish-medium Şam Mekteb-i tıbbiyye-i mulkiyye-i şahane in Damascus acquired books written in French and enacted French proficiency tests. In 1880 the dual Ottoman Turkish and French-medium law school, Mekteb-i Hukuk, was established.

Around 1859 the Ottoman Turkish-medium School of Administration (Mekteb-i mülkiyye-i şahane) was established. Strauss stated that it helped build the elite of Arab and Albanian areas within the Ottoman Empire and post-Ottoman countries. The school had a significant number of Armenian and Greek faculty and students even though Ottoman Turkish was the educational medium. In 1880, the dual Ottoman Turkish and French-medium law school, Mekteb-i Hukuk, was established.

Other medical schools included Faculté Française de Médecine de Beyrouth in Beirut and Şam Mekteb-i tıbbiyye-i mulkiyye-i şahane in Damascus; they were French-medium and Ottoman Turkish-medium, respectively. The latter acquired books written in Ottoman Turkish and French and enacted French proficiency tests.

In addition foreign entities established Robert College in Istanbul as well as Saint Joseph University and Syrian Protestant College (now American University of Beirut) in Beirut.

A number of Ottomans studied abroad in Europe.

== Educational institutions ==
- Anatolia College in Merzifon (Tertiary component)
- Imperial School of Medicine
- Imperial School of Naval Engineering (Ottoman Turkish: Mühendishane-i Bahr-i Hümâyûn), now Istanbul Technical University
- Sanasarian College in Erzerum
- Talas American College in Kayseri

== Notable figures ==
- Esad of Ioannina
