= Hovhannes Bujicanian =

Armenian teacher in the Ottoman Empire

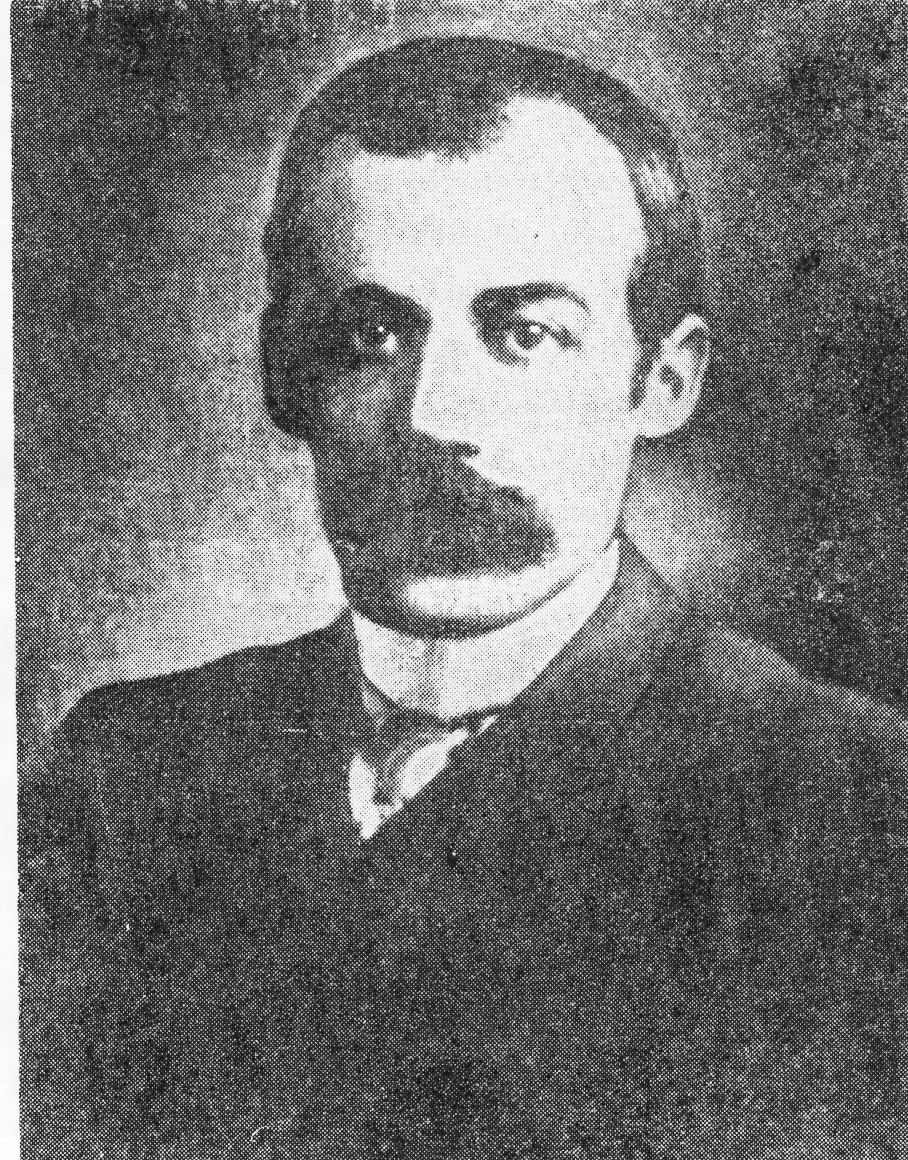
Hovhannes Bujicanian

Hovhannes Bujicanian (born, Çüngüs, 1873, - Harpoot, 1915) was an Armenian academic and teacher in the Ottoman Empire. He was a defender of the Second Constitutional Order within the Ottoman Empire and an influential functionary in the Euphrates College.

== Biography ==
Between 1906 and 1908 he attended the University of Edinburgh, where he studied Psychology and Philosophy and got to know the possibilities within a democratic environment. As following the Young Turk Revolution in 1908 the Ottoman Constitution was re-instated, the life for Armenians improved significantly which was also the case for the education according to the Armenian tradition and culture. Eventually, he became a teacher of Ethics at the Euphrates College. From November 1909 onwards he wrote for the Euphrates Colleges newspaper Yeṗrad (Euphrates in Armenian. As a teacher at the Euphrates College, he welcomed the possibility to be able to celebrate the 1500th anniversary of the Armenian alphabet in 1913. Following the defeat of the Ottoman Army in the Battle of Sarikamis in January 1915, he was arrested on the 1 May 1915. He was joined by Donabed Lulejian, another teacher of the Euphrates College in June of the same year and both were subjected to torture. The two reportedly attempted to commit suicide but were not able to do so. Bujicanian would be transferred to a prison in Elazığ and later killed as was trying to reach exile abroad.
