= Talas American College =

Secondary school

- Talas Amerikan Koleji
- Talas, Kayseri

Information
- Other name: Talas Academy
- Type: Private, Boarding
- Motto: Head, Hand, Heart & Health
- Established: 1889; 137 years ago
- Founder: American Board of Commissioners for Foreign Missions
- Closed: 1968; 58 years ago
- Language: English
- Campus type: Suburb
- Houses: Wingate Hall
- Color: Maroon Peach

Talas American College (Talas Amerikan Koleji or Talas Amerikan Ortaokulu in Turkish) often abbreviated as Talas American or TAO was a highly selective, independent, all-boys, boarding school located in Talas, Kayseri.

Talas American College graduated 857 students over a span of 40 years, from 1927 to 1967. For many years, Talas alumni continued their education at Tarsus American College for high school, and after Talas closed, the remaining students were transferred to TAC, further strengthening the bond between the two institutions. In order to maintain this connection and preserve the name of Talas, the Health and Education Foundation (Turkish: SEV) decided to name the new campus of Tarsus American College the Talas Campus. During a ceremony at the Homecoming event, Talas American College alumni were also present.

== History ==
The history of Talas American College is linked to the activities of the American Board of Commissioners for Foreign Missions in Turkey. Founded in 1810 and receiving its charter in 1812, the ABCFM was a Protestant organization based in Boston, USA. Its mission was to send missionaries abroad for religious purposes, as well as to engage in educational and healthcare initiatives. In 1820, the first ABCFM missionaries arrived in İzmir, located in the western part of the Ottoman Empire, and began to explore the surrounding region of Anatolia. With limited knowledge of the area, their initial focus was to understand the local communities and identify how they could contribute to the welfare of the population. This exploration led to reports on the region, its people, and the existing conditions.

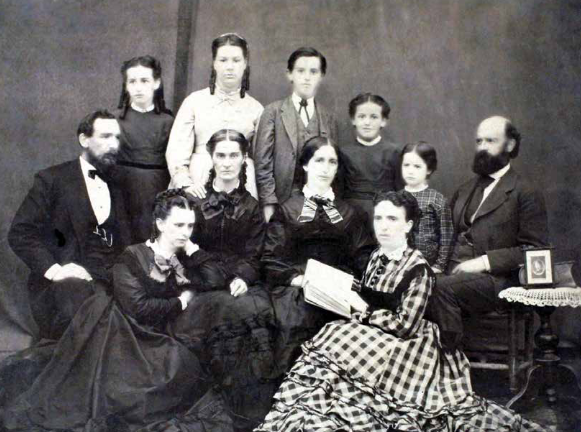
The members of the founding association of Talas American College were Lyman Bartlett, Cornelia Bartlett, Caroline Farnsworth, Wilson Farnsworth, Sarah Closson, and Ardelle Griswold, circa 1870 in Talas, Kayseri.

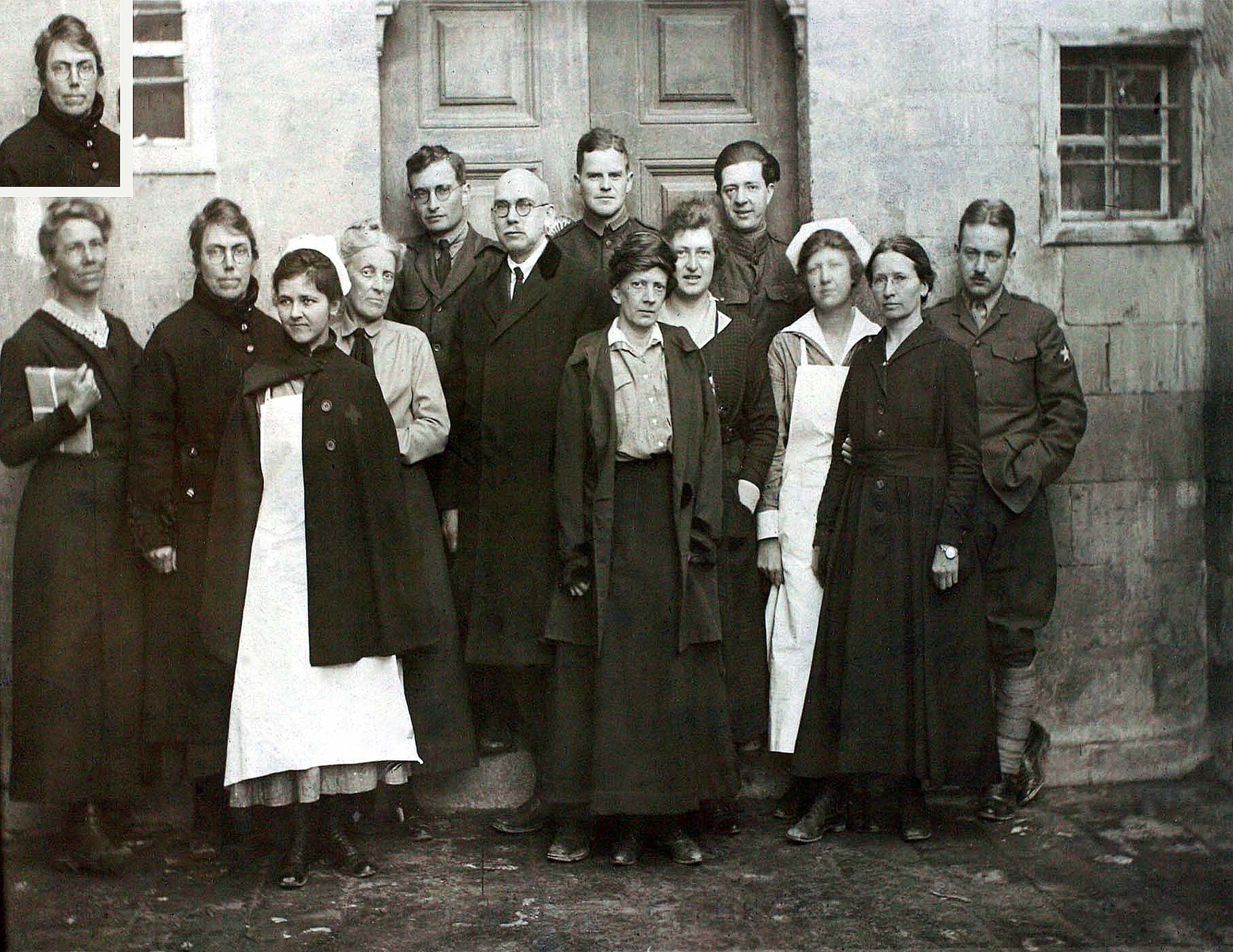
Members of the American Board, including Stella Loughridge (first on the left), teacher Susan Orvis (second from the left), and Henry Wingate (sixth from the left) in Talas, Kayseri, 1919.

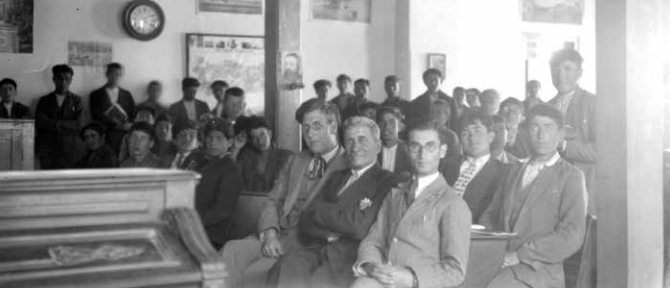
Students and faculty of Talas American College, circa 1930.

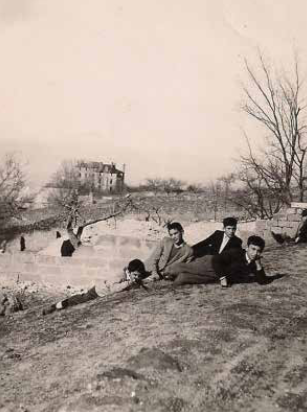
Students of Talas American College, with Wingate Hall visible in the background, circa 1950.

In 1827, Elnathan Gridley, a missionary sent by the American Board, traveled to Kayseri to study the condition of Christians in the region. His visit and the subsequent work of other missionaries in Anatolia contributed to the establishment of educational institutions, including Talas American College. In the decade following the Wilson Farnsworth's settlement in Kayseri, significant progress was made, and additional members of the American Board of Commissioners for Foreign Missions began to join them. By the late 1860s, along with the Farnsworth family, several missionary families had established themselves in Kayseri.

According to Brian Johnson's When Men and Mountains Meet, the year 1889, when the building known as Konak was opened for educational purposes, is considered the founding year of Talas American College. In addition to their support in Talas, the American missionaries also shared responsibilities at the Argeus Boys' High School in Kayseri, which had been founded in 1883. However, the management of the school was primarily overseen by the local community, rather than the missionaries themselves. This indicates that the missionaries' educational activities in the region were initially focused on supporting local institutions rather than establishing their own school for boys.

The school in Talas, along with other institutions established by the American Board of Commissioners for Foreign Missions, continued its activities until the outbreak of World War I in 1914. However, by 1916, the Ottoman government requisitioned many American Board properties across Turkey, including the Talas campus, to be used as military hospitals. While the American missionaries in Talas were allowed to continue using two of their homes, Henry K. Wingate was appointed as the consular representative for both American nationals and citizens of Allied nations remaining in the region. However, with the severance of diplomatic relations between the United States and the Ottoman Empire in the spring of 1917, the Ottoman government expelled all American Board members from Talas. This marked a significant turning point for the institution and its activities in the region.

In 1926, the American Board of Commissioners for Foreign Missions sent one of its most experienced and active members, Paul Nilson and Harriet Fisher Nilson, to Kayseri to revive the schools in Talas. Nilson had started his career with the American Board in 1911 at the St. Paul Institute in Tarsus, where he taught until 1915. After World War I, he returned to Tarsus and managed the St. Paul Institute for the next five years. During this time, Nilson worked to bring the school in line with the newly established educational laws and national curriculum of the Republic of Turkey. Under his leadership, the school received official authorization and was renamed Tarsus American College. His efforts were part of a broader initiative to adapt the American educational institutions in Turkey to the changing political and educational landscape following the establishment of the Republic.

After 86 years of serving the region and graduating notable alumnus, Talas American College was closed in 1968. Since 1976, the boys' school building has been utilized by the Provincial Youth and Sports Authority. When Talas American College closed in 1967, a decision was made to establish TED Kayseri College in the city to continue providing education in English. Şahap Sicimoğlu, then-mayor of Kayseri, along with around twenty local residents came together to take the first steps toward its establishment. The initiative was well-received, and on December 21, 1965, it was decided to open a branch in Kayseri. During the opening ceremony, the symbolic first lesson was given by Hugh Kelly, the last headmaster of Talas American College. The school officially began its educational activities on Monday, September 26, 1966, with a ceremony held in the school's garden. The building that once housed the girls' school, which had been repurposed as a hospital in 1911, was handed over to Erciyes University in 1978.

== Notable alumni ==
- Mete Akyol, Turkish journalist and author
- Cengiz Çandar, Turkish journalist and member of the Grand National Assembly of Turkey
- Korkut Boratav, Turkish Marxist economist
- Ayhan Sicimoğlu, Turkish musician and television presenter
- Celil Oker, Turkish crime fiction novelist
- Ertuğrul Kürkçü, Turkish politician
- Vahan Cardashian, Armenian-American political activist and lawyer
- İskender Sayek, Turkish surgeon and professor
- Uluç Gürkan, Turkish academic, formerly at Middle East Technical University
- Henry H. Riggs, American missionary and president of the Euphrates College
- Mehmet Coral, Turkish novelist, known for Extinct Times of Byzantium and The Lost Diaries of Constantinople
- Oral Çalışlar, Turkish journalist and author
- M. Tamer Özsu, Turkish-Canadian computer scientist
- Uygur Kocabaşoğlu, Turkish historian, formerly at the METU Department of History and Cambridge University (1991-1993)

== See also ==
- List of missionary schools in Turkey
- List of high schools in Turkey
