= Dünya (newspaper) =

Turkish newspaper

- Type: Daily newspaper
- Founder: Nezih Demirkent
- Founded: 1 March 1952; 74 years ago
- Language: Turkish
- Headquarters: Istanbul, Turkey
- Country: Turkey
- Circulation: 54,826 (2010)
- Website: www.dunya.com

Dünya (Turkish: The World) is a Turkish newspaper founded in 1981 by Nezih Demirkent, who was also its editor-in-chief in his lifetime. The newspaper covers mainly business news and has a circulation of around 55,000.

== Columnists ==
- Mete Akyol
- Güngör Uras
