= Celil Oker =

Turkish writer (1952–2019)

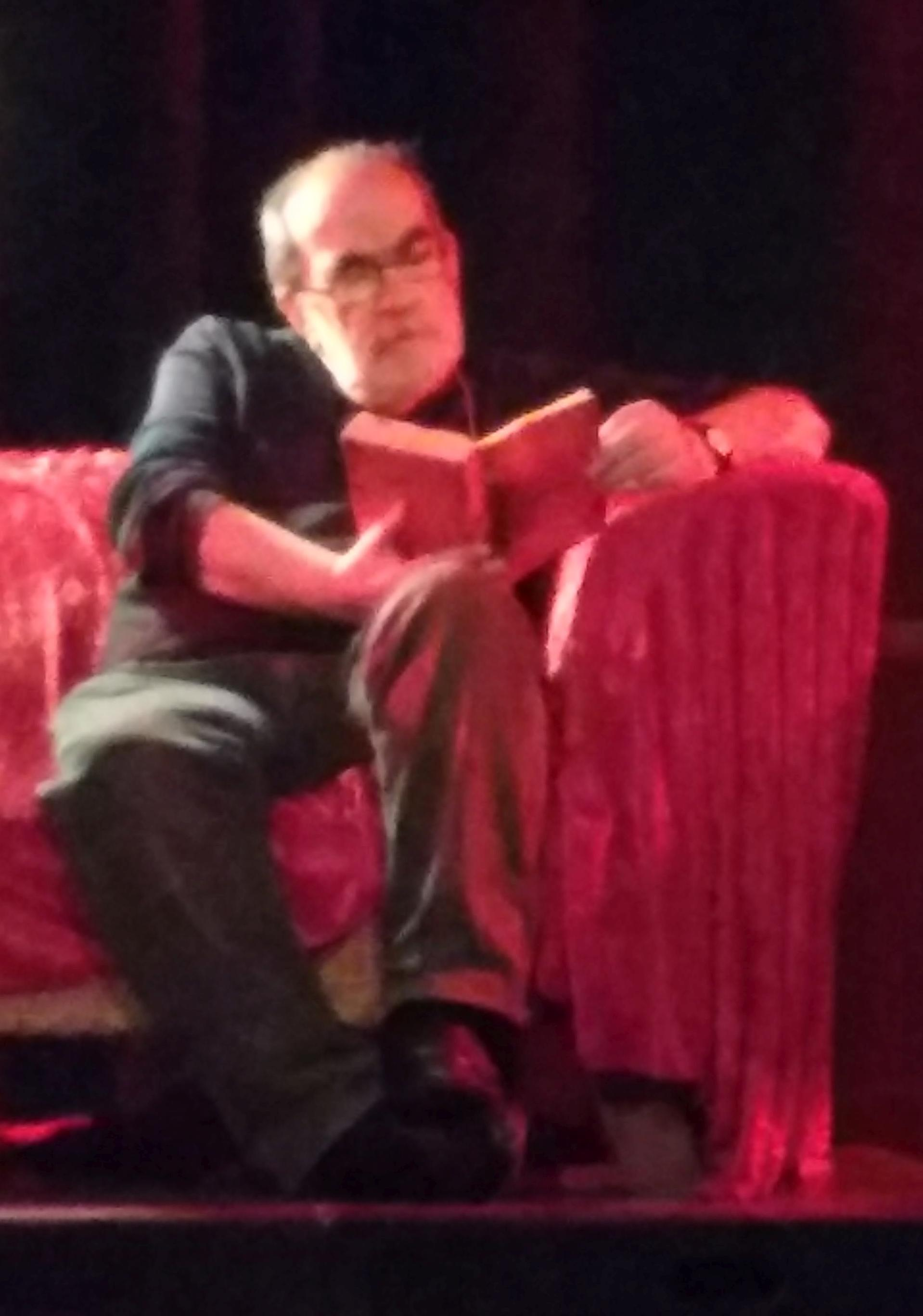
Celil Oker in 2017.

Celil Oker (1952 – 5 May 2019) was a Turkish crime fiction writer.

== Biography ==
After studying at Talas Amerikan Junior School, he graduated from Tarsus American High School. Subsequently, he moved to Istanbul and studied at Boğaziçi University. After graduating from the English Language and Literature department in 1971, he worked as a translator, journalist and encyclopedia writer. He transferred to advertising as a copywriter in various prominent agencies. After more than a decade as a partner in an agency he co-founded, he quit the industry in 1999. Subsequently he worked as a full-time lecturer in the Communication Faculty of Istanbul Bilgi University. He married and he has two children. In 2004, Celil Oker, Pınar Kür, Elif Şafak, Murathan Mungan and Faruk Ulay wrote a novel. Five authors each of whom continued to write when the other one left it unfinished. He died in Istanbul on May 5, 2019.

== Works ==
=== Novels ===
- Çıplak Ceset, April 1999
- Kramponlu Ceset, October 1999
- Bin Lotluk Ceset, July 2000
- Rol Çalan Ceset, July 2001
- Son Ceset, January 2004
- Bir Şapka Bir Tabanca, October 2005
- Yenik ve Yalnız, August 2010
- Beyaz Eldiven Sarı Zarf, September 2011
- Sen Ölürsün Ben Yaşarım, December 2015

=== Other ===
- Beşpeşe. with Murathan Mungan, Pınar Kür, Faruk Ulay, Elif Şafak. (June 2004)

== Award ==
He won Kaktüs Kahvesi awards with his first novel Çıplak Ceset, 1998.
