= Mete Akyol =

Turkish journalist (1935–2016)

- Born: 1935; Ordu, Turkey
- Died: 2 November 2016 (aged 80–81); Istanbul, Turkey
- Education: Tarsus American Highschool, Ankara University
- Occupations: Journalist, writer
- Spouse: Gülçin Akyol
- Children: Ufuk Akyol

Mete Akyol (1935, Ordu - 2 November 2016, Istanbul) was a Turkish journalist.

Akyol studied in Talas American Junior High school and Tarsus American High school. He graduated from the English Literature section of Ankara University in 1960.

Beginning by 1959, Akyol served in the Milliyet, Öncü, Hürriyet, Dünya, Günaydın and Sabah newspapers as a reporter, columnist and editor. He also served in the television channels Turkish Radio and Television Corporation (TRT), NTV, TV8 and Kanal B. Between 1998 and his death date, he was the executive editor of the periodical Bütün Dünya, a periodical similar to Reader's Digest.

Beginning by 1987, he also lectured in the Istanbul University, Marmara University and Başkent University.

Akyol died on 2 November 2016 in Istanbul.

== Books ==
- Düzenzedeler ("System victıms")
- Mevzuat böyle Efendim ("Sir this is the regulation")
- Yazamadıklarım ("Those which I couldn't write")
- Hem yaşadım Hem yazdım ("I lived and wrote")
- Aynen naklen ("As it is and as by rumor")
- Bir başkadır benim mesleğim ("My profession is a different profession")
