= Güngör Uras =

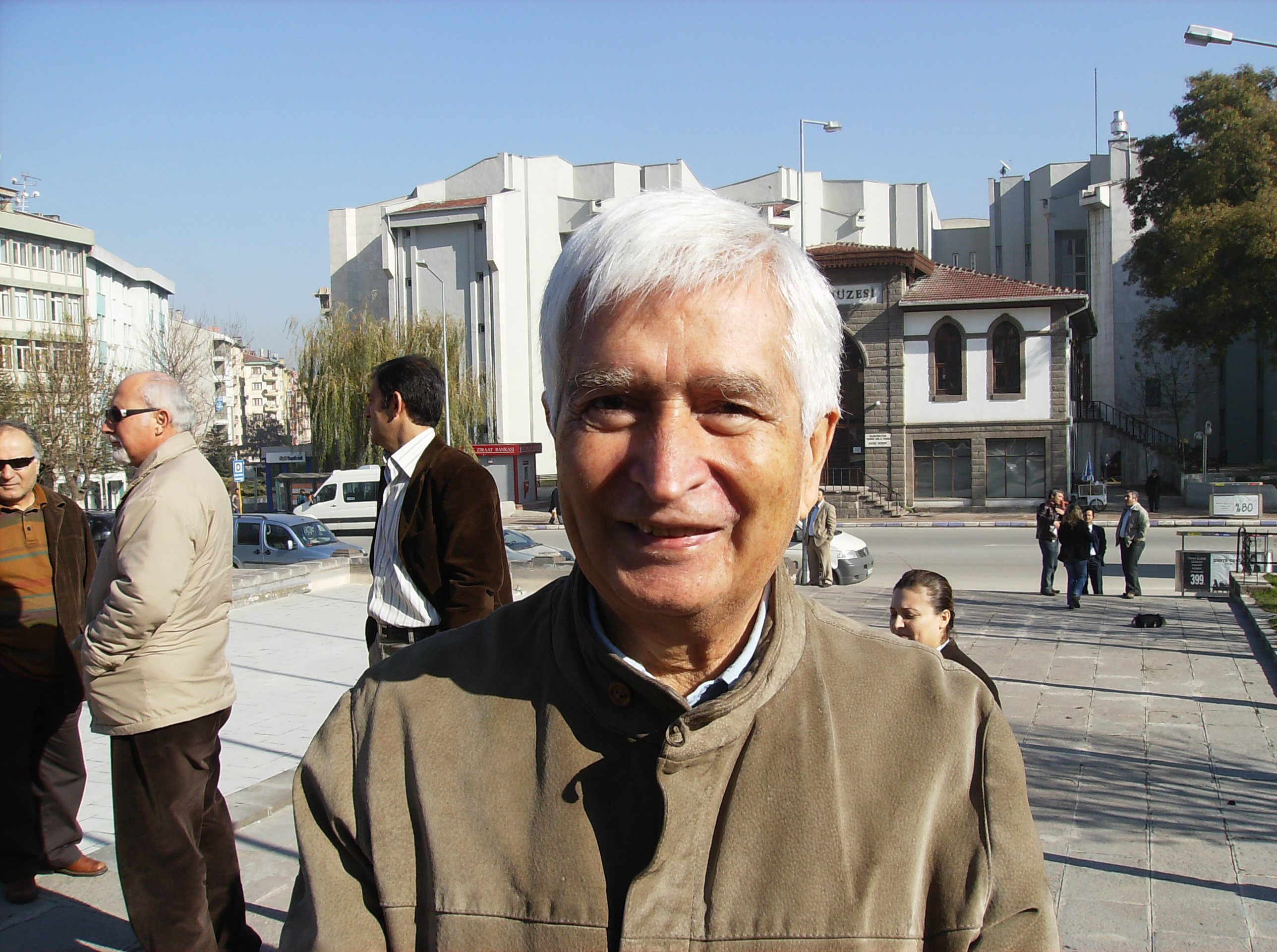
- Güngör Uras in 2007
- Born: Tevfik Güngör Uras; 22 July 1933; Düzce, Turkey
- Died: 19 August 2018 (aged 84); Istanbul, Turkey
- Resting place: Aşiyan Asri Cemetery
- Education: Faculty of Political Science, Ankara University
- Occupations: Economist; author
- Years active: 1968–2018
- Spouse: Nuran Uras
- Children: 1
- Website: gungoruras.com

Tevfik Güngör Uras (22 July 1933 – 19 August 2018) was a Turkish economist, journalist, academic and author. He wrote more than ten thousand economic articles in various newspapers. In general, he tried to explain the economy simply to his readers. To accomplish this goal, he explained simple economic issues in daily life by creating the imaginary characters of "Aunt Ayşe" and "Uncle Ali Rıza" in some of his writings.

== Life ==
He was born in 1933 in Düzce to a civil servant. After finishing his studies at Ankara College, he graduated from the Finance Department of the Faculty of Political Science, Ankara University (1955). Afterwards, he completed his PhD at the Faculty of Economics of Istanbul University and became an associate professor at Boğaziçi University (1988) and a professor at Marmara University (1994).

Between 1962 and 1974, he worked at the State Planning Organization as an expert staff member. In 1974, he became the first general secretary of the Turkish Industry and Business Association (TÜSİAD) and held that position until 1980. He served as chairman of the Board of Directors of Aksigorta for a while. Until 1993, he worked at Istanbul University, Faculty of Economics. Then, he worked as a faculty member at Marmara University Faculty of Communication until 2001. Güngör Uras was known for his writings on economy after 1968. Although he worked for various newspapers, he wrote mainly for the newspapers Dünya and Milliyet. More than thirty of his works were published by DPT and other publishing houses. After presenting the programs "Olayların İçinden" on TRT 2, "Akıl Defteri" on CNN Türk, he started presenting on NTV Radyo's morning program Ayşe Teyze Ne Yapsın and simultaneously presented NTV's Sokağın Ekonomisi together with Berfu Güven. Uras, who was married and had a child, died on 19 August 2018 at the American Hospital where he was being treated. His funeral was held on 22 August 2018 at Bebek Mosque and his body was buried at Aşiyan Asri Cemetery.

In October 2018, a street was named after him on Cunda Island in Ayvalık, Balıkesir.

== Writing career ==
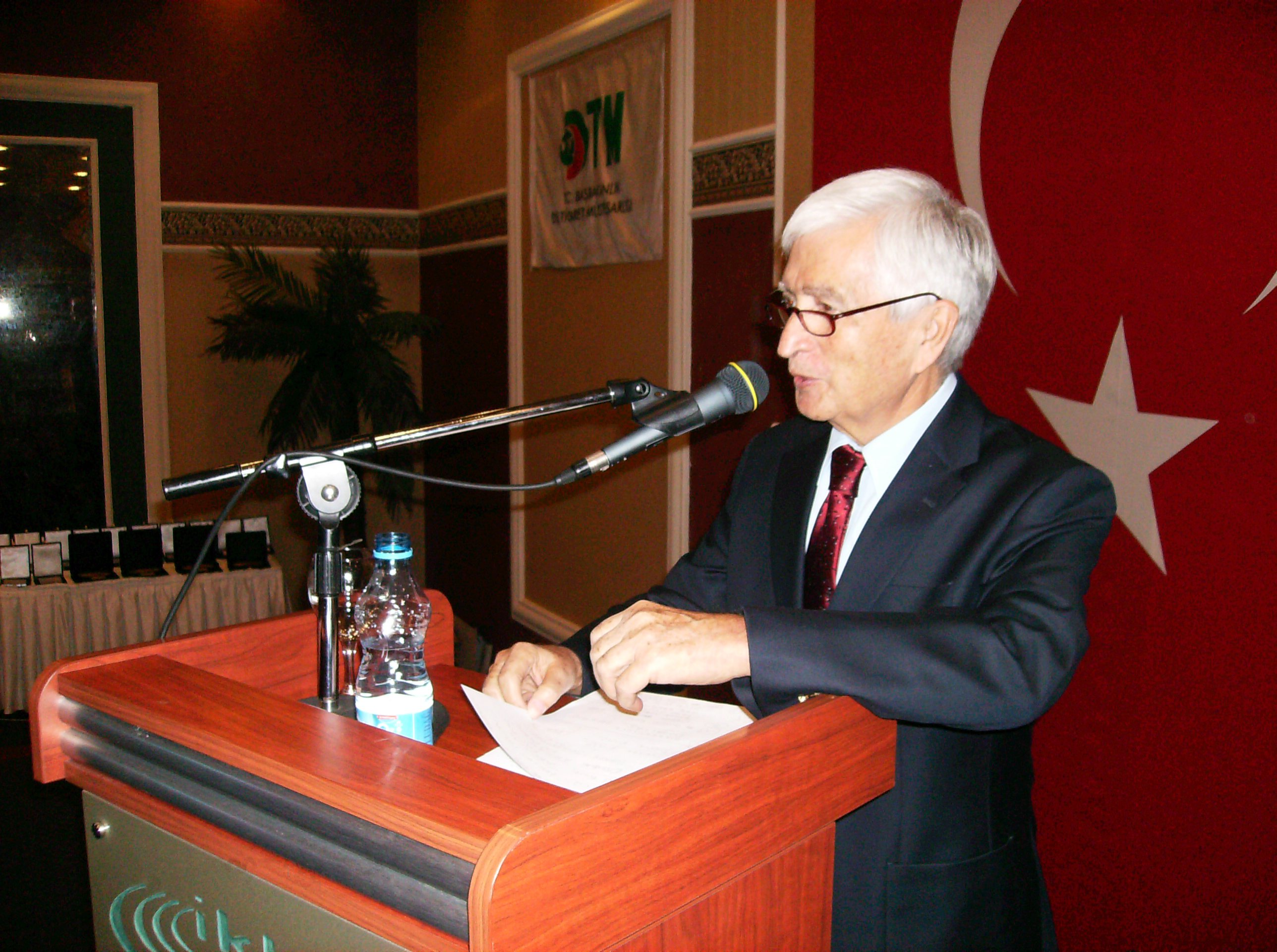
Uras while giving a speech at a panel in 2007

He had his first writings published in 1968 on Türkiye İktisat. After 1980, he anonymously wrote articles on the front page of İzmir's Rapor newspaper. Later he wrote articles short humorous stories about economy on Güneş, and continued to write about politics and economy on Sabah, Dünya and Milliyet newspapers. At the same time, he penned articles about food with the pseudonym Ali Rıza Kardüz. (Note: This was his maternal grandfather's name.) In 1983, he began to write columns for the newspaper Dünya titled "Olayların İçinden" and as one of the first writers of the newspaper, he wrote for this newspaper continuously. At the same time, he wrote articles for Sabah for 10 years. Uras also wrote for Yeni Yüzyıl, a subsidiary of Sabah, and after 1998 he started writing for Milliyet. He continued to write for Milliyet and Dünya until his death.

According to Economist Mahfi Eğilmez, Güngör Uras was a person who measured the economic situation, social structure, welfare and cultural texture of Anatolia and the places he went to. Before describing a topic in his writings, he would simplify the concepts of the subject and then enter the details.

== Bibliography ==
Uras's various works / publications are as follows:

- Halk Kredisi ve Türkiye’de Tatbiki, Ege Printing House, Ankara 1955, 40 pp.
- Küçük Sanayiciler için Kooperatif, Ajans Türk Printing House, Ankara 1965, 80 pp.
- Tarım Kooperatifleri ile Devlet Arasındaki İlişki, Doğuş Printing House, Ankara 1966, 40 pp.
- İkinci Beş Yıllık Plan Özel Sektör İçin Neler Getiriyor? Odalar Birliği Printing House, Ankara 1967, 48 pp.
- What will the Second Five car Development Plan Bring to the Private Sector, Odalar Birliği Printing House, Ankara 1967, 52 pp.
- Sanayiciler İçin Teşvik Tedbirleri, Kağıt ve Basım İşleri A.Ş., Istanbul 1968, 110 pp.
- Devalüasyon Öncesi ve Sonrası Ekonomik Gelişme Politikası, Odalar Birliği Printing House, Ankara 1971, 32 pp.
- Recent Economic Policies in Turkey, Odalar Birliği Printing House, Ankara 1971, 42 pp.
- Tarım Satış Kooperatifleri Sistemi Yoluyla Tarım Ürünleri Fiyat Destekleme Politikasının Finansmanı Sorunu, Şark Printing House, Ankara 1971, 68 pp.
- Türkiye’de Sermaye Piyasası, Şark Printing House, Ankara 1973, 20 pp.
- Türkiye’de Yabancı Sermaye Yatırımları, Formül Printing House, Istanbul 1979, 375 pp.
- Borsa, Sabah Publications 1990, 96 pp.
- Turkey, From Ten Thausand Years of Civilization to the Present (with Yılmaz Karakoyunlu) Creative Publishing 1991, 320 pp.
- Ekonomide Özallı Yıllar (1980-1990) Afa Publications 1993, 178 pp.
- Fikir Üreten Fabrika (with Feyyaz Berker), Doğan Books, 2009, 340 pp.
- Bak Ben Sana Anlatayım, Doğan Books, 2010, 256 pp.
- Bilinmeyen Bodrum, Boyut Publishing, 2015, 179 pp.
- Sanayileşecektik, Büyüyecektik, N’oldu Bize, Doğan Books, 2017, 168 pp.
