= Bütün Dünya =

- Editor: Ufuk Akyol
- Categories: General interest
- Frequency: Monthly
- Founded: 1948; 77 years ago
- Company: Başkent University
- Country: Turkey
- Based in: Istanbul
- Language: Turkish

Bütün Dünya (English: 'Whole World') is a monthly Turkish periodical.

The magazine was published from 1948 to 1984 in a format similar to the American Reader's Digest. After a long pause, it resumed publishing after 1998 by the Başkent University. Mete Akyol was the executive editor until his death in 2016.

As of 2017, the masthead gave the staff as:

- Owner: Professor Mehmet Haberal (on behalf of Başkent University)
- Executive editor: Mete Akyol (after his death Ufuk Akyol)
- Managing editor: Gülçin Orkut
- Technical manager: Faruk Güney
- Publication advisor: Yaşar Öztürk
- Turkish language advisor: Haydar Göfer
- Art advisor: Süheyla Dinç
- Education advisor: Dr. Fatma Ataman
