= Henry H. Riggs =

Christian missionary

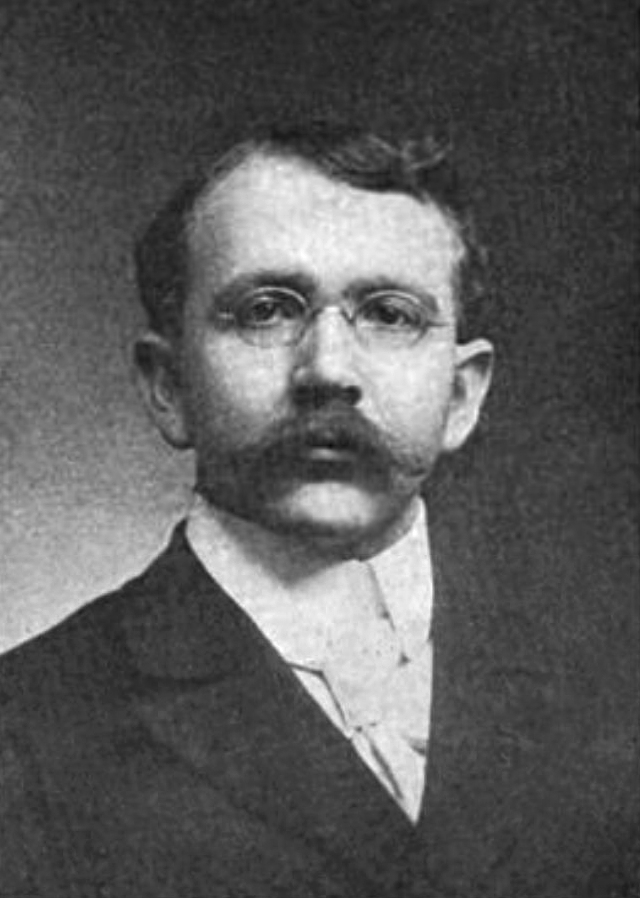
- Born: March 2, 1875; Sivas, Ottoman Empire
- Died: August 17, 1943 (aged 68); Jerusalem, Palestine
- Occupations: Christian missionary and witness to the Armenian Genocide
- Notable work: Days of Tragedy in Armenia: Personal Experiences in Harpoot, 1915-1917

Henry H. Riggs (March 2, 1875 – August 17, 1943) was a Christian missionary stationed in Kharpert during the Armenian genocide. In his book Days of Tragedy in Armenia: Personal Experiences in Harpoot, 1915-1917, Riggs provides an important eyewitness account of the genocide and concluded that the deportation of Armenians was part of an extermination program organized by the Ottoman government. The book is considered to be one of the most detailed accounts of the Armenian genocide in the English language.

== Early life ==
Henry Harrison Riggs was born to a family of Christian missionaries in Sivas, Ottoman Empire on March 2, 1875, and was the son of Edward Riggs. He joined the church of Marsovan in 1889. After growing up in the area, Riggs traveled to the United States where he acquired his education at the Carleton College in Northfield, Minnesota, and the Auburn Theological Seminary, and graduated from 1902. The same year, Riggs was appointed missionary to Turkey by the American Board of Commissioners for Foreign Missions. Upon arrival in the Ottoman Empire, Riggs studied at the Talas American College near Kayseri. Riggs eventually became the president of the Euphrates College from 1903 to 1910. After his presidency, he began his Evangelist work in the Kharpert province.

== Armenian genocide ==
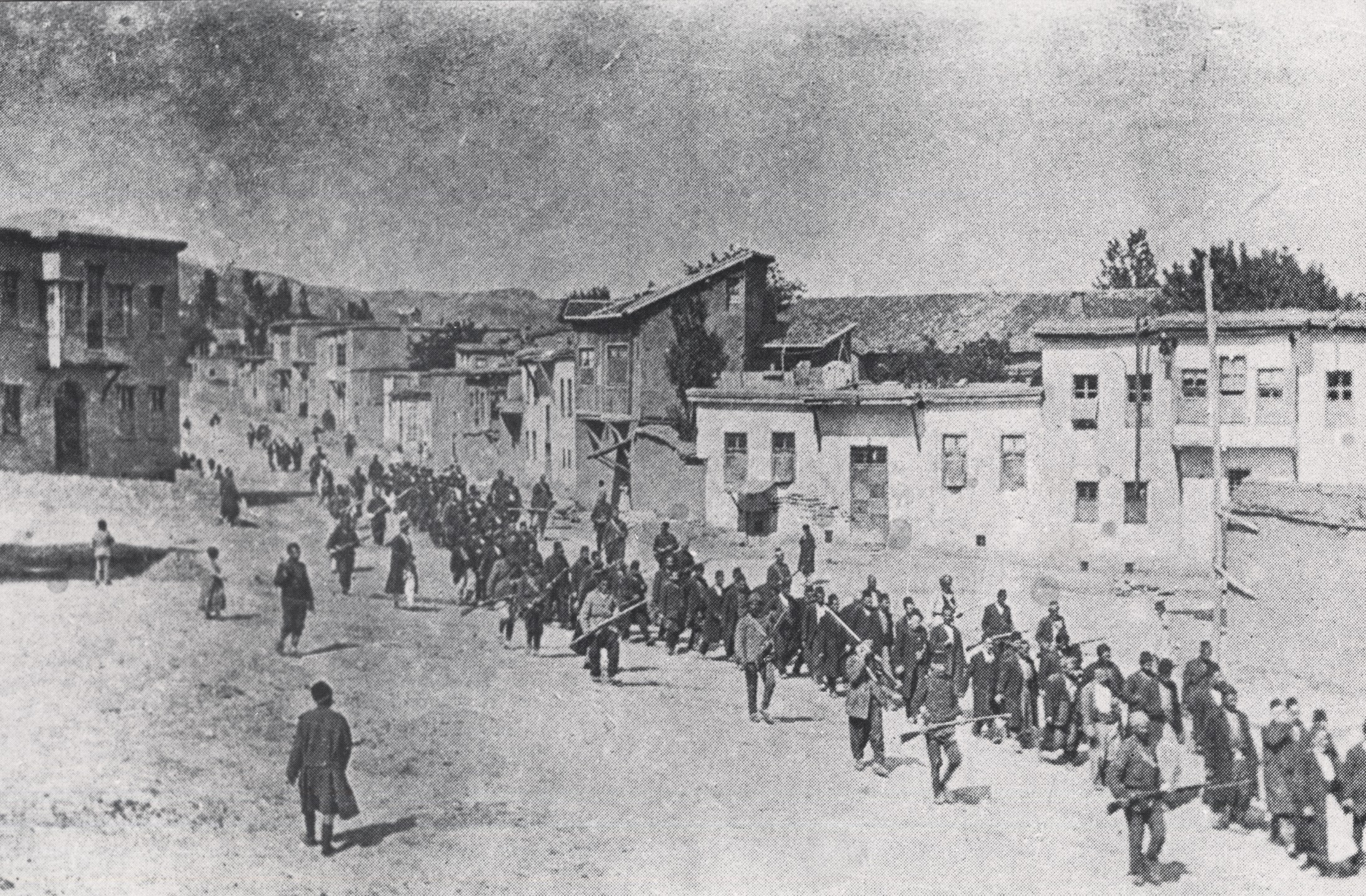
Armenian civilians, escorted by armed Ottoman soldiers, are marched through Harput (known as Kharpert by Armenians, the kaza of the Mamuret-ul Aziz), to a prison in the nearby Mezireh as reported by Riggs

Henry Riggs first wrote about the propaganda that was initiated by the government prior in entering World War I. He recalls that "the Turkish authorities began a systematic build-up of hostility," dispensing "a great deal of fiction to prove that the Armenians were a disloyal element menacing the safety of the Turks." He declared that the case brought up against the Armenians was ultimately "in the minds of the common Turkish people, in preparation of atrocities which were to follow." Riggs further noted concerning self-defense measures Armenians had taken in response to being massacred:

The loss of Van to the Russians, through the activity and bravery of the Armenians, produced a tremendous impression. Of course it was not then generally known that the Armenians had only acted in self-defense after the Turks had massacred many of them. Outbreaks were reported in various places, and some of these, notably in the region of Diarbekir, were real enough, though the Armenians were the victims not the aggressors in these disturbances.

When the Armenian genocide started, deportations and arrests of prominent Armenians were planned for the Kharpert Armenians. Riggs writes:

It was evident that some terrible fate was being planned for the Armenians, though as yet no hint had been given as to what that fate should be. By June 20th several hundred of the leading Armenians had been put in prison, and on that day one hundred and fifty from the prison in Harpoot were sent to Mezireh, and three days later were sent out to their death. On June 26 came the reply to the Vali's perfidious representations. The edict was posted in public places, and announced by street criers throughout the Armenian quarters of the city. All the Armenians and Syrians of Harpoot and vicinity must go into exile to a destination in Mesopotamia. The announcement was made on Saturday, and all the people were commanded to be ready to start on the following Thursday.

Riggs described in detail the procession out of the prison and how it ended:

They followed the highway for about ten miles, and then were turned off toward the right, and marched up into the mountains. Soon after passing the crest of the ridge, they were marched down into a deep ravine, where they were ordered to sit on the ground. When they were all seated, bound as they were, their guards, with their rifles and bayonets, fell upon them and commenced a butchery that the imagination refuses to picture. So huge was the task of slaughter, that three or four men succeeded in escaping from the ravine while the gendarmes were busy with the horrid labor. These fugitives scattered and hid, but were pursued and hunted out by the relentless guards, who found and butchered them in their hiding places only one escaping, so far as known. This young man, whose name I dare not reveal as he is still living in Turkey, succeeded in evading his pursuers and hiding till nightfall. Then he started out to try to return to some place of safety but lost his way in the dark and wandered all night long, not knowing which way he was going. At last, as dawn began to break, he found his bearings again, and in the gray light, stole in to the American hospital and to safety.

Driven to death, threatened, outraged [raped], starved and perishing with thirst, it is not to be wondered at that the vast majority of the weary host lay down by the roadside to die. And of those who escaped and found their way to us, many were emaciated and weakened beyond description, and many more heartbroken at the loss of those who had not survived the ordeal. On several occasions, mothers who succeeded in coming to us for help told how with their own hands they had thrown their little ones into the river, rather than endure the prolonged agony of seeing them slowly starve to death at their empty breasts, as they themselves were starving.

— Henry Riggs writing about the situation of the deportees

During the summer of 1915, Riggs observed the transit camps of the deportees using a telescope and wrote that "for most of the women and children was reserved the long and lingering suffering that massacre seemed to them a merciful fate—suffering such as was foreseen and planned by the perpetrators of this horror. I speak guardedly and state as a fact this horrid indictment of the Young Turks by whom the crime was committed."

As the deportations took place, Riggs remarked about the deportations and subsequent wholesale massacre of Armenians in the deserts of Syria:

Very good evidence exists for the belief that both there and Ras-ul-Ain, also in the same desert, the people were massacred wholesale as soon as they left the villages where they had been quartered. At the beginning of the period under discussion, that is, at the beginning of 1916, there were in exile in that district something like 485,000 Armenians. Fifteen months later, after the last deportation had been completed, not more than 113,000 out of that throng could be located. Out of the 372,000 who had perished most had died from starvation and disease, but many thousands were also massacred at the last moment, when apparently the Turkish government had tired of the pretense of carrying out the theory of deportation.

Riggs believed that the deportation of Armenians was part of an extermination program organized by the Ottoman government and concluded that:

The abuses and murder of ordinary Armenians during these "deportations" were too persistent to be dismissed as simple aberrations of a purportedly benign official policy of population transfer.

Riggs further added that "the attack on the Armenian people, which soon developed into a systematic attempt to exterminate the race, was a cold-blooded, unprovoked, deliberate act, planned and carried out without popular approval, by the military masters of Turkey."

Riggs also wrote in July about the measures taken of confiscating Armenian assets by saying, "you could not look out of the window without seeing someone walking down the street carrying some sort of load of booty, bought or stolen from Armenian houses."

After the establishment of the Republic of Turkey, Henry Riggs believed that "Turkey re-established herself on a basis excluding the Christian races" and continued to maintain in 1943, decades after the Armenian genocide ended, that:

During the preceding decade the Turkish people, and again especially their leaders, had been guilty, before God and man, of one of the most revolting crimes in history [1915]. The triumphant reestablishment of the Turkish sovereignty not only left that crime unpunished, but, in the mind of probably a majority of the Turks, the horrid course which they had pursued had been gloriously vindicated.

== Later life ==
His brother Ernest Wilson Riggs succeeded him as president of Euphrates College 1910 to 1921 and participated in Near East Relief Work and then joined James Levi Barton as associate secretary and corresponding secretary of the American Board of Commissioners for Foreign Missions from 1921 to 1932.

Meanwhile, Henry Riggs continued missionary work through his interest in Kurdish ethnic studies and produced a translation of the Kurdish Gospel into Arabo-Kurdish dialect.

He was then sent to Beirut, Lebanon, in September 1923 and continued his Evangelist missionary work among Armenian refugees in Lebanon and Syria. During that time, he also taught in the Near East School of Theology.

Riggs eventually served as an Executive Secretary of the Near East Christian Council. In 1940, the family moved to Auburndale, Massachusetts, for the education of their two daughters. He returned to Beirut in 1943 and eventually became ill in Jerusalem and died there on August 17, 1943, at the age of 68.

== Personal life ==
Henry Riggs married three times; first with Annie Tracy in 1904 (died 1905), second with Emma Barnum in 1907 (died 1917), and last, with Annie Denison in 1920. Annie Denison Riggs, mother of Ruth Elizabeth Riggs Steiner and Helen Sarah Riggs Rice, died in 1949 at the age of 62.

Henry Riggs spoke Armenian, Turkish, and English.

== See also ==
- Witnesses and testimonies of the Armenian genocide

== Sources ==
- Kieser, Hans-Lukas (2010). Nearest East : American Millennialism and Mission to the Middle East. Temple University Press. ISBN 9781439902240.
- Riggs, Henry H. (1996). Days of Tragedy in Armenia: Personal Experiences in Harpoot, 1915-1917. Gomidas Institute. ISBN 1884630014.
