= Donabed Lulejian =

Armenian teacher in the Ottoman Empire

Donabed Lulejian (2 January 1875, Harput – 1917 Erzurum) was an Armenian editor and teacher in the Ottoman Empire.

== Biography ==
He was a teacher at the Armenian Euphrates College in Harput, where he taught chemistry. As following the Young Turk Revolution in 1908 the Ottoman Constitution was reinstated, the life for the Armenians improved significantly which was also the case for the education in Armenian language. Between 1909 and 1910 he wrote for the college's newspaper Yeprad (Euphrates in Armenian). He wrote about the difficulties but also the necessity of a support for an understanding between the Armenians and Turkish nations. From 1910 onwards he studied at the Universities in Yale and Cornell in the United States. As he returned to the Euphrates College in 1912, he was one of the Armenian intellectuals which emphasized the importance of the maintenance of Armenian-Turkish bonds. During the 1500th anniversary of the Armenian alphabet in October 1913, which was celebrated widely in the schools around Harput but specially in the Euphrates College, he held a speech focused on a resurgence of an Armenian intellectual progress. In 1915 he was detained and tortured together with his brother and also a fellow teacher at the Euphrates College Hovhannes Bujicanian. Lulejian escaped captivity and established himself in the mountains in the Dersim region where he wrote his memoirs. He couldn't publish them during his lifetime as in 1917 he died from typhus in Erzurum, which at the times was governed by the Russian Empire.

== Personal life ==
He was married to Yeghsa Hedison and was the father of four children: Hratchia, Ara Donabed, Zevart and Dikran. All four survived the Armenian genocide and established themselves in the United States.
