= Euphrates College =

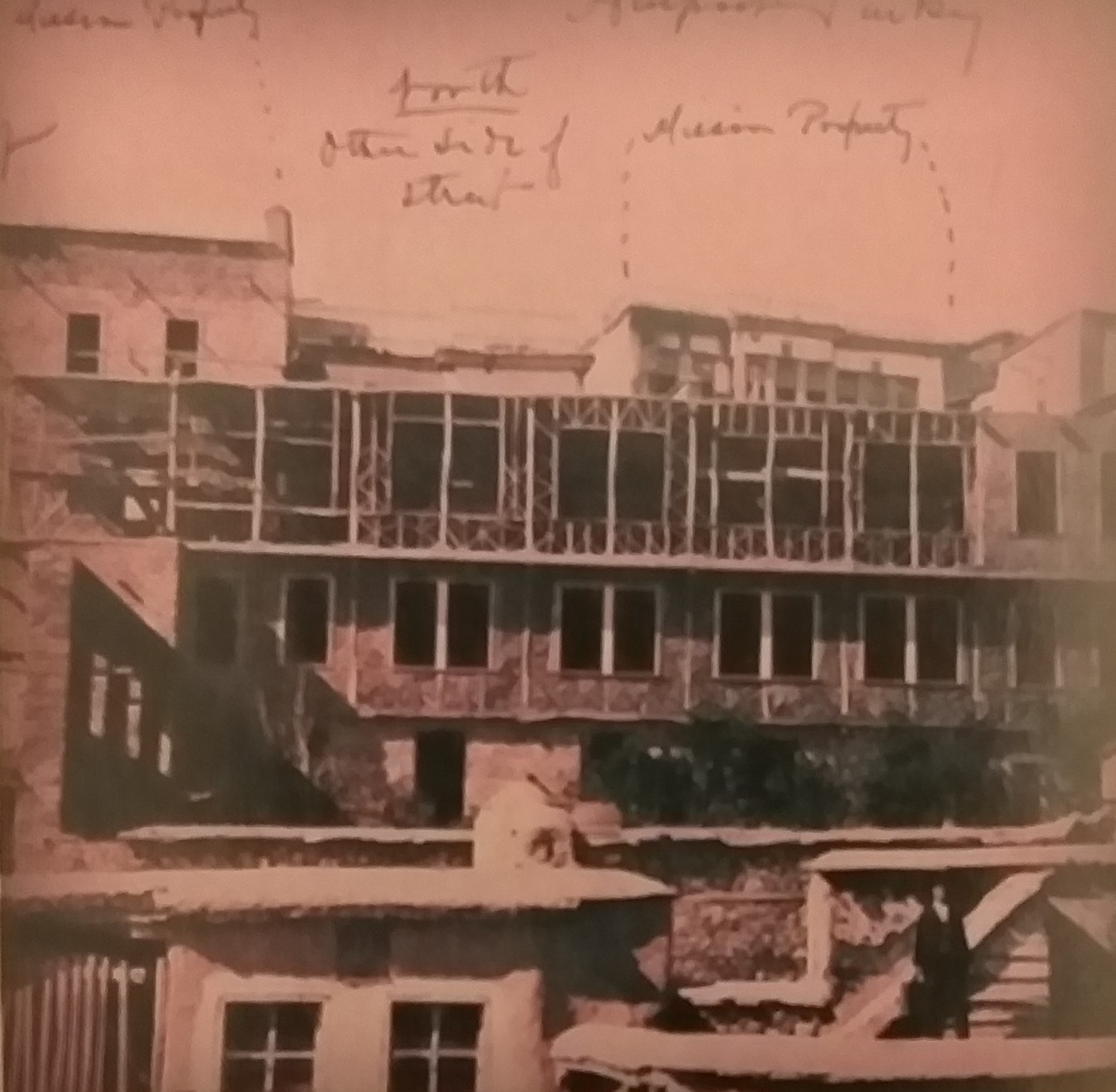
Photo of Euphrates College

Euphrates College (Turkish: Fırat Koleji, Armenian: Եփրատ Գոլէճ) was a coeducational high school in the region of Harput (the town of Harput is now part of the city of Elazığ, in eastern Turkey), founded and directed by American missionaries and attended mostly by the Armenian community in the region.

== History ==
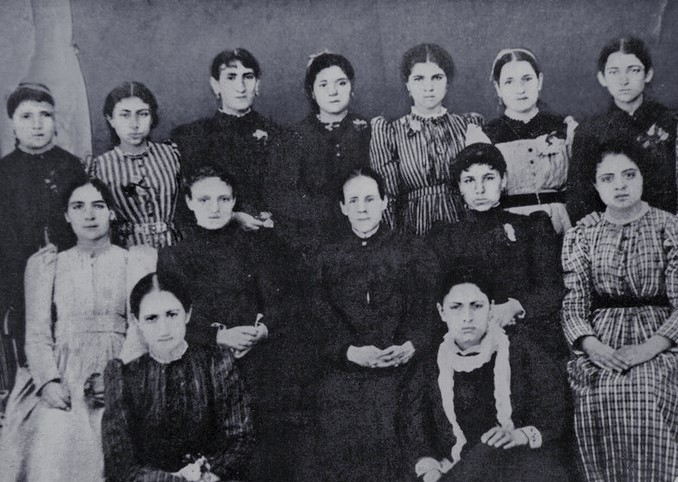
Yeprad College female students in 1897

In 1852 the American Board of Commissioners for Foreign Missions established a theological seminary in Harput to educate clergymen for the Armenian Evangelical Church, and expanded it 1859 to "American Harput Missionary College". To meet the growing demand for general education in English language, the school's program was extended in 1878, and it was renamed "Armenia College". However, after 10 years, the Ottoman authorities urged to change the school's name, which became finally "Euphrates College". For the building of the college, $140,000 funds were raised from the US Government and $40,000 from the local people in 1875. The facilities at the college consisted of a hospital and an orphanage in addition to a theological seminary and high schools for boys and girls. In 1891, the school shortly released a handwritten newspaper called Asbarez, which was soon forbidden by the Ottoman authorities.

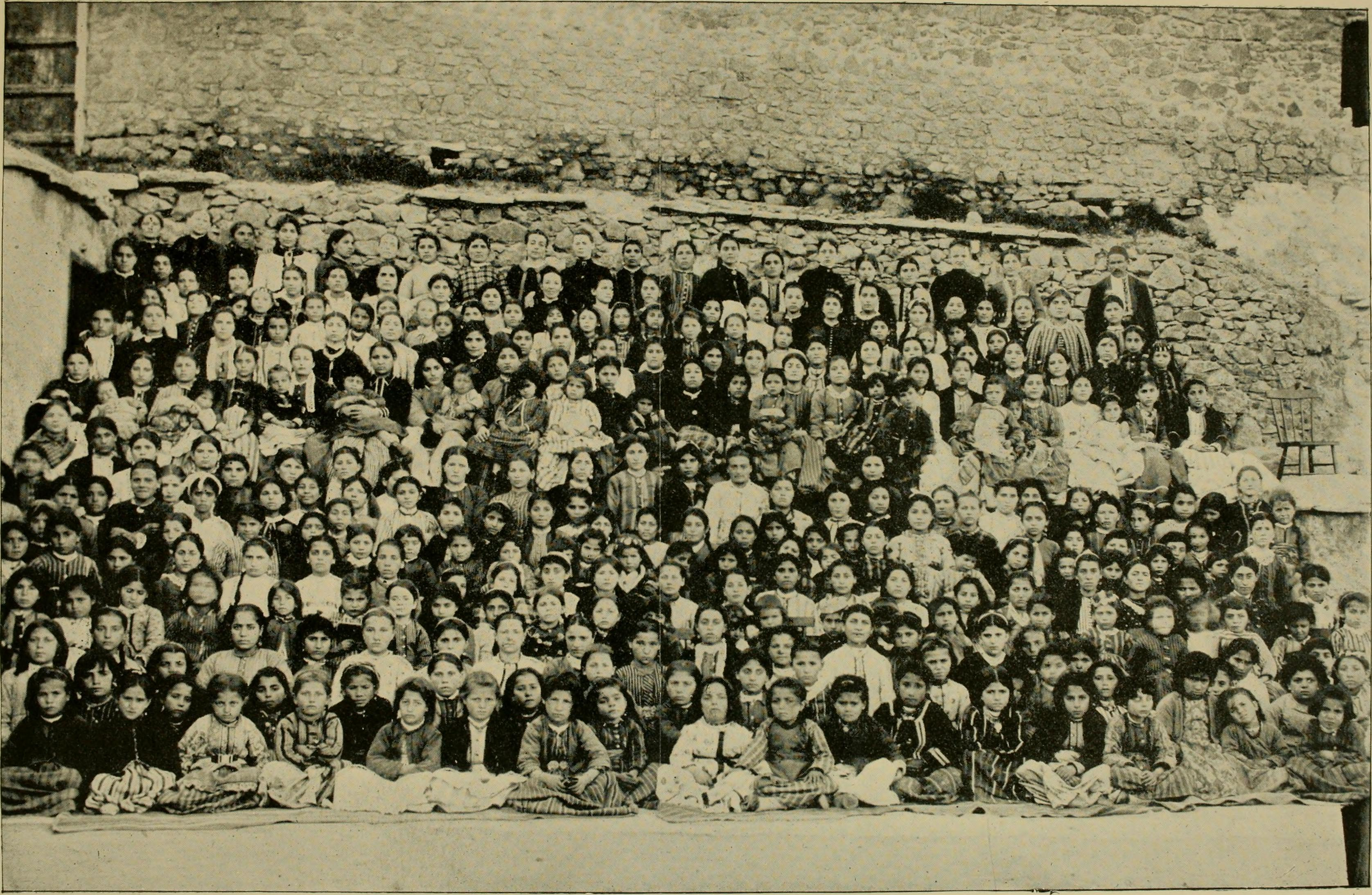
Girls in the Euphrates College of Kharpoot (1873)

In 1895, Kurds looted and burned the Armenian villages on the Harput plain, and in the same month the town was attacked and eight of the twelve buildings on the campus were burned down.

Following a change in the approach towards the Armenian population during the Second Constitutional Era of the Ottoman Empire, the Armenians received much more rights. In 1909, the college began to publish a newspaper called Yeprad (Euphrates in Armenian). A printing press was installed within the college and following several bulletins, but also religious and school books were printed in Armenian script. The college was an influential institution for the cultivation of the Armenian language during the Ottoman Empire and in 1913 the 1500th anniversary of the Armenian alphabet was celebrated with a large procession. With the support of German missionaries, in the college was inaugurated a Bible school on the 1 October 1913. In 1915 several of the leading Armenian members of the faculty were arrested, tortured, and executed on trumped-up charges. The college buildings were then occupied by the Ottoman Military and initially used as training camp, and later as a military hospital.

Euphrates College was officially closed shortly after the founding of the Republic of Turkey and nothing now remains of its buildings.

== Presidents ==
- Dr. Crosby Wheeler (1878-1893)
- Dr. James Levi Barton (1893-1894)
- Dr. Caleb Frank Gates (1894-1903)
- Rev. Henry H. Riggs (1903-1910)
- Ernest Wilson Riggs (1910 - 1921) (Henry H. Riggs' brother) departed Euphrates in 1921 to conduct Near East Relief work for a year, was expelled from Turkey, and then became a corresponding secretary of the American Board of Commissioners for Foreign Missions

== Faculty ==
- Ellsworth Huntington (1897–1901)
- Ashur Youssouf
- Donabed Lulejian

In addition to Lulejian: Nigohos Tenekejian, Hachadoor Nahigian, Garabed Sohigian, Hovhannes Bujicanian, Mergerdich Vorberian, Samuel Hachadoorian. These 7 names are cited as Professors at Euphrates College on a memorial monument at Vernon Grove Cemetery, Milford, Massachusetts. Other memorials to Armenia & 11 Armenian victims of a 1914 fire on West St. are also in the same cemetery.

== Notable students ==
- Shahan Natalie

== See also ==
- List of missionary schools in Turkey
- List of high schools in Turkey
- Education in the Ottoman Empire and List of schools in the Ottoman Empire
