= Olpin =

Olpin is a surname. Notable people with the surname include:

- A. Ray Olpin (1898–1983), American university president
- Albert H. Olpin (1870–1923), LDS missionary and public official
- Robert S. Olpin (1940–2005), American art historian, professor, and author

== See also ==
- Olin (name)
- Joseph Olpin House
