= Zoline =

Zoline is a surname. Notable people with the surname include:

- Joseph T. Zoline (1912–2004), American businessman
- Pamela Zoline (born 1941), American writer and painter
- John Lifton-Zoline, also known as John Lifton, artist and theorist

== See also ==
- Oline (name)
