= Olin (name) =

Olin is both a surname and a given name.

== Notable people named Olin ==
=== Surname ===
- Abram B. Olin (1808–1879), U.S. Representative from New York
- Antero Olin (born 1948), Finnish artist
- Bob Olin (1908–1956), American boxer
- Bob Olin (born 1966) American actor, director, producer
- Charles H. Olin (1867–1914), Canadian politician from the Northwest Territories and Alberta
- Dave Olin (born 1947), Democratic Farmer Labor Party, Minnesota House of Representatives
- Elisabeth Olin (1740–1828), Swedish opera singer
- Elizabeth Olin (born 1988), American actress
- Ferris Olin (born 1948), American feminist scholar
- Franklin W. Olin (1860–1951), American industrialist, founder of the Olin Corporation and creator of the F. W. Olin Foundation
- Gideon Olin (1743–1823), American politician from Vermont
- Henry Olin (1768–1837), American politician from Vermont
- Jim Olin (1920–2006), American politician from Virginia
- Johan Olin (1883–1928), Finnish Olympic wrestler
- John Olin (1886–1920), American professional wrestler
- John M. Olin (1892–1982), Chairman of the Olin Corporation, son of Franklin W. Olin
- Julia Lynch Olin (1882–1961), American author
- Ken Olin (born 1954), American television actor, director and producer
- Kristina Axén Olin (born 1962), Swedish Moderate Party politician
- Laurie Olin (born 1938), American landscape architect
- Lena Olin (born 1955), Swedish actress
- Milo H. Olin (1842–1907), American businessman and politician from New York
- Milton Olin, Jr. (1948–2013), American businessman and former Napster COO
- Mathea Olin (born 2003), Canadian surfer
- Margreth Olin (born 1970), Norwegian film director
- Nahum Olin (born 1957), Mexican race car driver and team owner
- Nelly Olin (1941–2017), French Minister of Environment
- Ralf Olin (1925–2007), American speed skater
- Spencer Truman Olin (1900–1995), American industrialist and philanthropist
- Stephen Olin (1797–1851), American educator and minister
- Stephen Henry Olin (1847–1925), American lawyer and acting president of Wesleyan University
- Steve Olin (1965–1993), American professional baseball player
- Stig Olin (1920–2008), Swedish actor
- Thomas F. Olin (1928–1996), American businessman, Chairman of Archway Cookies
- Thomas F. Olin, Jr. (born before 1990), American businessman, also of Archway Cookies
- Tommy Olin (born 1962), Swedish curler
- William M. Olin (1845–1911), Massachusetts Secretary of the Commonwealth

=== Given name ===
- Olin G. Blackwell (1915–1986), American prison warden
- Olin Branstetter (1929–2011), American businessman and politician
- Olin Browne (born 1959), American professional golfer
- Olin Hatfield Chilson (1903–1991), United States federal judge
- Olin Downes (1886–1955), American music critic
- Olin Dows (1904–1981), US Army artist
- Olin Dutra (1901–1983), American professional golfer
- Olin J. Eggen (1919–1998), American astronomer
- Olin Francis (1891–1952), American actor
- Olin Howland (1886–1959), American character actor
- Olin M. Jeffords (1890–1964), American lawyer from Vermont
- Olin W. Joerg (born 1956), German lawyer from Augsburg
- Olin D. Johnston (1896–1965), South Carolina politician
- Olin Kreutz (born 1977), professional football player for the Chicago Bears
- Olin B. Lewis (1861–1936), American politician and educator
- Olin Mott (1921–2013), American businessman
- Olin R. Moyle (1887–1966), American lawyer
- Olin T. Nye (1872–1943), American lawyer, judge, and politician from New York
- Olin Stephen Pace (1891–1970), American politician from Georgia
- Olin Sewall Pettingill Jr. (1907–2001), American ornithologist
- Olin Clyde Robison (1936–2018), president of Middlebury College
- Olin Smith (1900–1966), American football player
- Olin Stephens (1908–2008), American yacht designer
- Olin E. Teague (1910–1981), American politician from Texas
- Olin Levi Warner (1844–1896), American sculptor
- Olin Dunbar Wheeler (1852–1925), American historian and author
- Olin Chaddock Wilson (1909–1994), American astronomer
- Olin Wellborn (1843–1921), American politician from Texas

Middle name

- Alvin Olin King (1890–1958), American politician from Louisiana
- C. Olin Ball (1893–1970), American food scientist
- Deb Olin Unferth (born 1968), American writer
- Erik Olin Wright (1947–2019)), American sociologist
- Floyd Olin Smith (1885–1961), American physician
- Scott Olin Wright (1923–2016), United States federal judge
- H. Olin Young (1850–1917), American politician from Michigan
- Lawrence Olin Brockway (1907–1979), American chemist
- Lindsey Olin Graham (1955–2026), American politician from South Carolina
- Philip Olin Keeney (1891–1962), American librarian accused of being a spy for the Soviet Union
- Topliff Olin Paine (1893–1922), US Army Air Corps pilot
- Vaughn Olin Lang (1927–2014), US Army lieutenant general
- Wilbur Olin Atwater (1844–1907), American chemist
- Wilbur Olin Hedrick (1868–1954), American economist
- William Olin Burgin (1877–1946), American politician from North Carolina
- William Olin Stillman (1856–1924), American physician and medical writer

== See also ==
- W. E. D. Ross (1912–1995), Canadian author who used the pen name "Olin Ross"
- Carmen Mondragón (1893–1978), Mexican artist known as "Nahui Olin"
- Ohlin, a similar Swedish surname
