= Florence Lesley Fox =

American nurse and Christian missionary

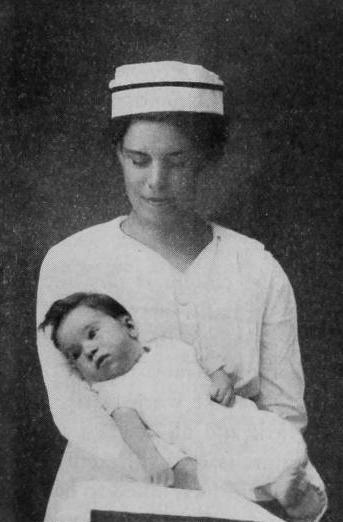
- Florence Fox with a baby, from a 1922 publication.
- Relatives: Anna Isabel Fox (sister); Floyd Olin Smith (brother-in-law)

Florence Lesley Fox (died after June 1971) was an American nurse and Christian missionary in the Philippines from 1920 to 1932, serving in Cagayan de Oro with her educator sisters Anna Isabel Fox and Grace Evelyn Fox.

== Early life ==
Florence Lesley Fox was from Albuquerque, New Mexico, the daughter of Rufus P. Fox and Anna B. Fox. Her father was a builder. She graduated from the University of New Mexico in 1903, and trained as a nurse in Battle Creek, Michigan.

== Career ==
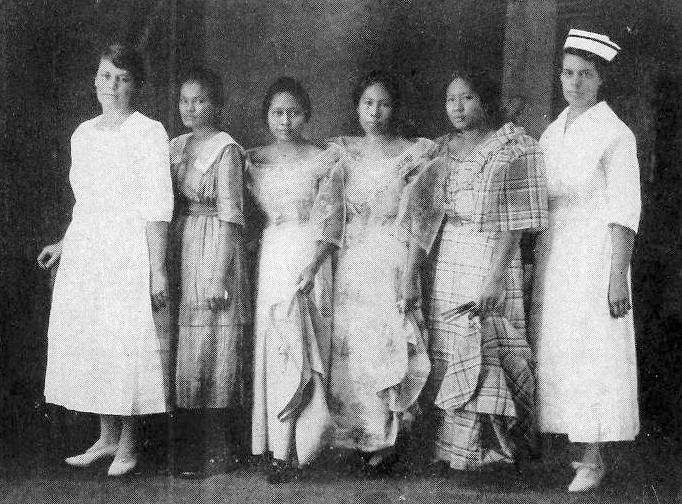
Anna Isabel Fox (left), Florence Fox (right, in nurse's uniform), and four Filipina students, from a 1922 publication.

Fox helped at a mission school in Cubero, New Mexico, in 1905. In 1920, Fox followed her sister Anna into missionary work at Cagayan de Oro in the Philippines. Their younger sister Grace Evelyn joined them in 1923. Fox acted as a visiting nurse, midwife, and superintendent of nurses at the mission hospital, working with her eventual brother-in-law, physician Floyd Olin Smith. She was also called upon to teach hygiene, sanitation, and music classes, and oversee dormitory provisions, at her sister's school. "I will not allow the hospital to use all my time and strength," she wrote in a published essay in 1922.

Fox spoke about her work to women's church groups during her 1926 leave in the United States. She returned to the United States again in 1932, with plans for further medical training in Ohio.

== Personal life and legacy ==
Fox and her sisters moved to California later in life. Florence Fox was alive when her sister Grace died, in Long Beach in 1971. Today the Fox sisters are remembered as noted figures in the history of the United Church of Christ of the Philippines in Cagayan de Oro.
