= Mountain Village =

Mountain Village may refer to:

- Mountain Village, Alaska, city in Kusilvak Census Area
- Mountain Village, Colorado, a home rule municipality in San Miguel County
- Shanzhai, sometimes translated as "mountain village", a Chinese term for counterfeit goods
