= Anna Isabel Fox =

American educator and Christian missionary

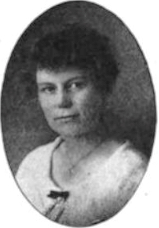
- Anna Isabel Fox, from a 1918 publication.
- Born: 1890
- Died: 1974 (aged 83–84)
- Other names: Isabel Fox, Anna F. Smith (after marriage in 1925)
- Occupations: Educator, Christian missionary in the Philippines
- Spouse: Floyd Olin Smith

Anna Isabel Fox (1890 – 1974), later Anna F. Smith, was an American educator and a Christian missionary in the Philippines.

== Early life ==
Anna Isabel Fox was raised in Albuquerque, New Mexico, the middle daughter of Rufus P. Fox and Anna B. Fox. Her father was a builder. She trained as a teacher at the University of New Mexico, graduating in 1910. In 1918, she completed further training at a Bible institute in New York, in preparation for overseas mission work.

== Career ==
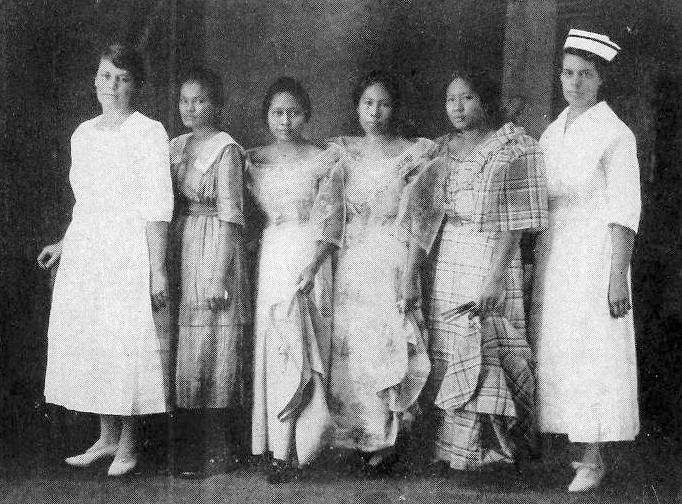
Anna Isabel Fox (left), Florence Fox (right, in nurse's uniform), and four Filipina students, from a 1922 publication.

Fox taught at a missionary school in San Rafael, New Mexico as a young woman. In 1918, she was appointed by the Woman's Board of Missions to work as a missionary teacher in the Philippines.

Fox served in the Philippines for eight years, from 1918 to 1927, as founder and first principal of a women's Bible school and dormitory in Cagayan province. "I am so glad I am here," she wrote in 1919. "It is such a beautiful place and the people are so charming and give such great promise." In 1922, she wrote, "The days grow more and more busy, and the more busy they are, the happier I am." Her sisters Florence Lesley Fox, a nurse, and Grace Evelyn Fox, an educator, followed her into mission work in the Philippines, in 1920 and 1923 respectively. She lectured on her work in the United States during a furlough in 1924 and 1925.

== Personal life ==
Anna Isabel Fox married a widowed medical missionary at Cagayan, Floyd Olin Smith, in 1925. The couple had children, including Annabell (born 1928) and Florence (born 1930). The Smiths retired to Felton, California in 1947. Anna F. Smith was widowed when Floyd Smith died in 1961. She died in 1974, aged 84 years; her grave is in Felton Cemetery, next to her husband's. Today the Fox sisters are remembered as noted figures in the history of the United Church of Christ of the Philippines in Cagayan de Oro.
