= Pandora, Colorado =

Unincorporated community in San Miguel County, CO, USA

Coordinates: 37°56′00″N 107°47′08″W

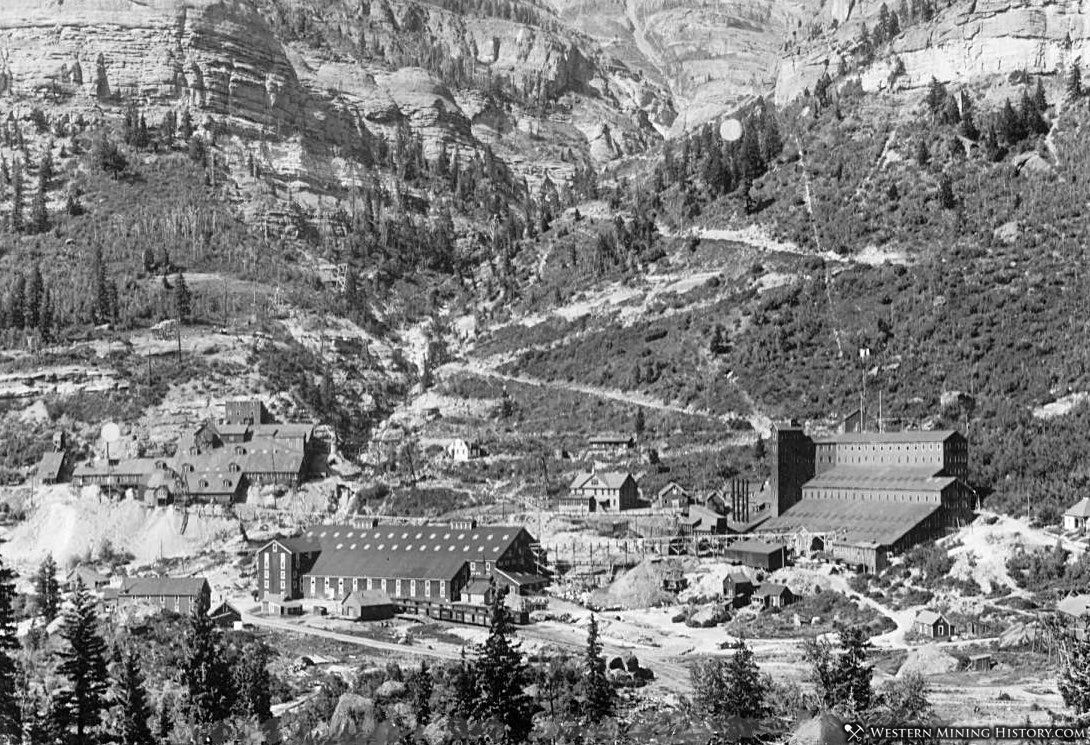
Smuggler-Union mills at Pandora around 1910–1920

Pandora is an unincorporated community located 1.5 miles (2.4 km) east of Telluride in San Miguel County, Colorado.

Pandora was founded in the 1880s as a mill town, serving as the site for mills of the Smuggler-Union, Tomboy, and Sheridan mines. The Rio Grande Southern railroad's Telluride branch terminated at the mills in Pandora. Milling largely ended during World War 2 (when by government order all precious metals mines were closed), by which time the townsite was largely covered in mill tailings. The Pandora Mill, previously one of the Smuggler Union mills, still stands at Pandora. The mill was constructed in 1920 to replace the previous Smuggler mill that had burned down. The mill had various periods of activity but was unusual in that it was one of the only gold mills in the country to stay open during World War II. The mill was allowed to remain open during the war due to the lead and zinc content of the ores processed there. Lead and zinc were needed for the war effort.

The Pandora Mill ceased operations in 1978. In recent years the Idarado company has been reclaiming the mill tailings, and residential development of the site is anticipated.
