= Telluride, Colorado =

- Home rule town
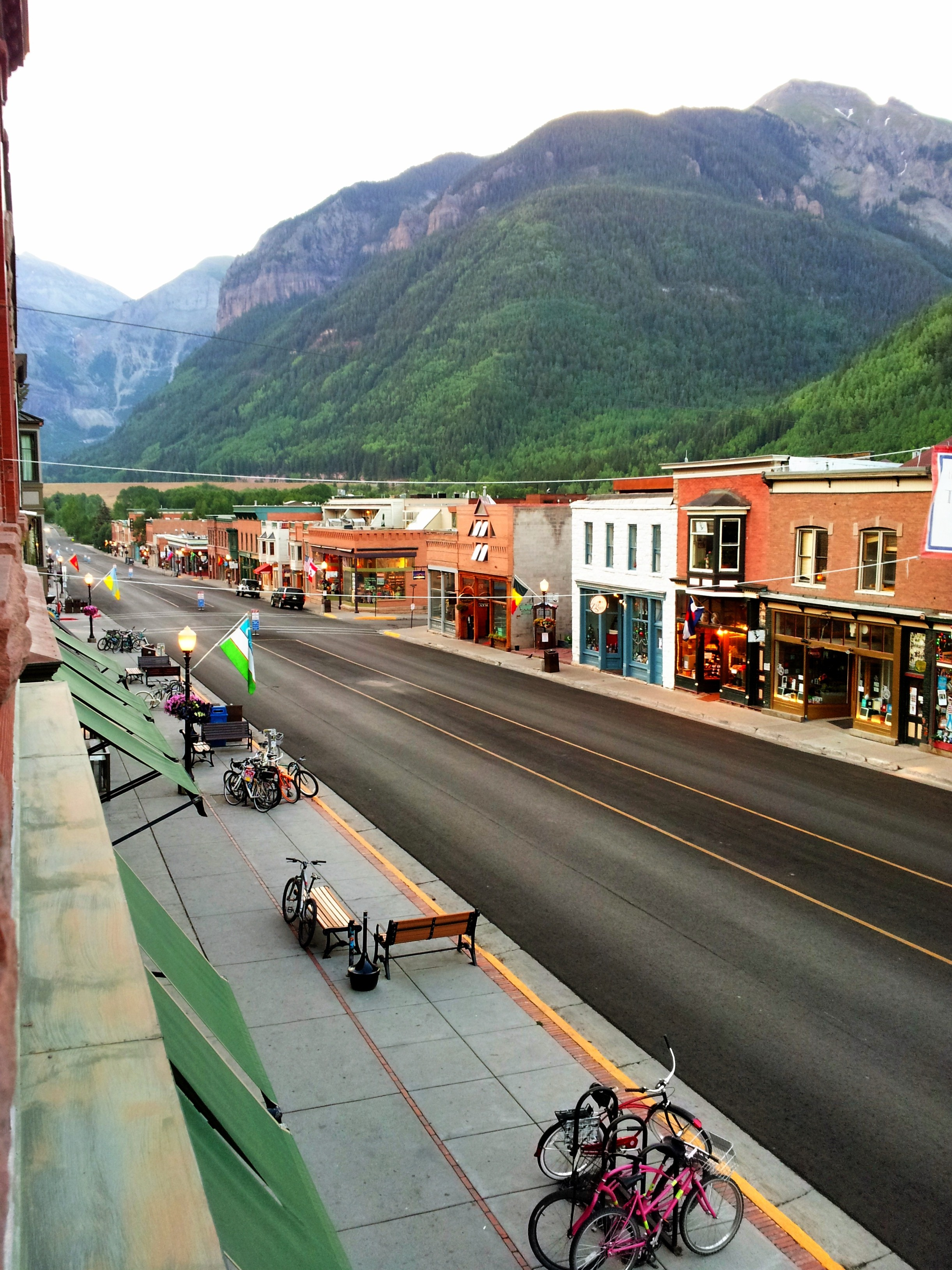
- Colorado Avenue: As seen from The New Sheridan Hotel

- Location of Telluride in San Miguel County, Colorado
- Coordinates: 37°56′22″N 107°49′05″W
- Country: United States
- State: Colorado
- County: San Miguel
- Founded: 1878
- Incorporated: February 10, 1887, as Columbia

Government
  - Type: Home rule municipality

Area
  - Total: 2.22 sq mi (5.76 km^{2})
  - Land: 2.22 sq mi (5.76 km^{2})
  - Water: 0 sq mi (0.00 km^{2})
- Elevation: 8,754 ft (2,668 m)

Population (2020)
  - Total: 2,607
  - Density: 1,172/sq mi (452.6/km^{2})
- Time zone: UTC−7 (MST)
  - Summer (DST): UTC−6 (MDT)
- ZIP code: 81435
- Area code: 970
- FIPS code: 08-76795
- GNIS feature ID: 2413371
- Website: Town of Telluride

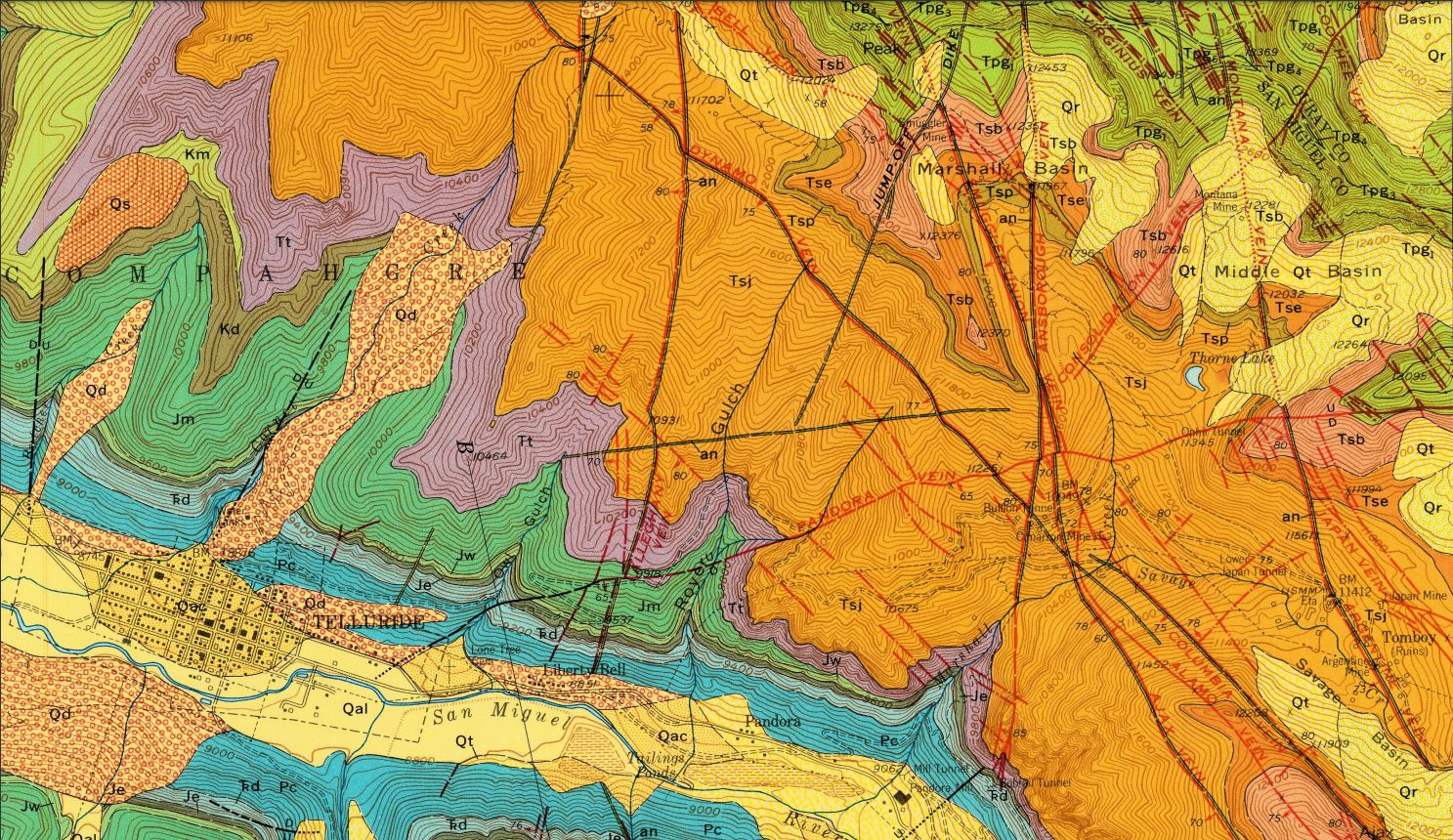
Telluride geological map and location of historic mines

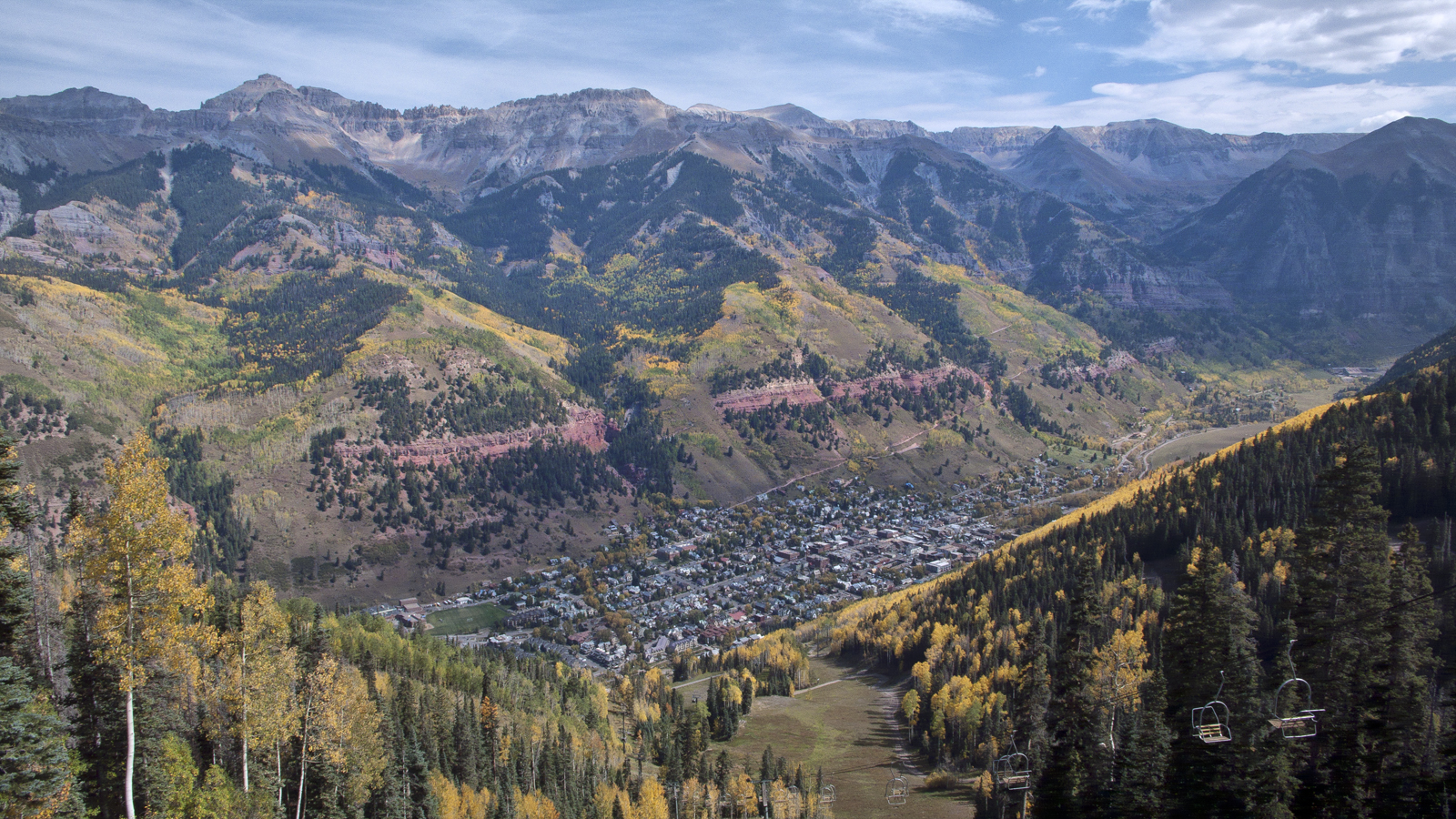
Fall colors in Telluride. View from the ski area, 2010

Telluride is the county seat and most populous town of San Miguel County in the southwestern portion of the U.S. state of Colorado. The town is a former silver mining camp on the San Miguel River in the western San Juan Mountains. The first gold mining claim was made in the mountains above Telluride in 1875, and early settlement of what is now Telluride followed. The town was founded in 1878.

Telluride sits in a box canyon. Steep forested mountains and cliffs surround it, with Bridal Veil Falls situated at the canyon's head. Numerous weathered ruins of old mining operations dot the hillsides. A free gondola connects the town with its companion town, Mountain Village, at the base of the ski area. Telluride and the surrounding area have featured prominently in popular culture, and it is the subject of several popular songs. It is especially known for its ski resort and slopes during the winter, as well as an extensive festival schedule during the summer, including the Hot Air Balloon Festival, which traditionally occurs the first weekend in June.

The Telluride Historic District, which includes a significant portion of the town, is listed on the National Register of Historic Places and is also one of Colorado's 20 National Historic Landmarks. The town population was 2,607 in the 2020 United States census.

== History ==
=== Mining days ===
Gold was first discovered in Colorado near present-day Denver, setting off the Pike's Peak gold rush of 1858. The Smuggler gold vein above Telluride, and placer gold in the San Miguel River, were discovered in 1875. John Fallon made the first claim in Marshal Basin above Telluride in 1875 and settlement followed. The town of Columbia was founded in 1878. The Telluride, Colorado, post office opened at Columbia on July 26, 1880, since the United States Post Office Department would not approve the name Columbia. Columbia (Telluride since 1887) has been the seat of San Miguel County, Colorado, since the county was created on March 2, 1883. The Town of Columbia was incorporated on February 10, 1887, but the town changed its name to the Town of Telluride a few months later. The town was named after valuable ore compounds of the chemical element tellurium, a metalloid element which forms natural tellurides, the most notable of which are telluride ores of gold and silver. Although gold telluride minerals were never actually found in the mountains near Telluride, the area's mines were rich in zinc, lead, copper, silver, and ores which contained gold in other forms.

Telluride began slowly because of its isolated location. In 1881, a toll road was opened by Otto Mears, which allowed wagons to go where only pack mules could go before. This increased the number of people in Telluride, but it was still expensive to get gold-rich ore out of the valley.

In June 1889, Butch Cassidy, before becoming associated with his gang, the "Wild Bunch", robbed the San Miguel Valley Bank in Telluride. This was his first major recorded crime. He exited the bank with $24,580 (equal to $890,458 today) and later became famous as a bank robber.

In 1891, the Rio Grande Southern Railroad, also begun by Mears, arrived in Telluride, eventually building a two-stall engine house, water facilities, a section house and a bunkhouse, sidings, and a depot. It continued further up the valley to end its Telluride branch at Pandora, serving the mines and the town until 1952. The cheaper and consistent transportation for passengers and freight allowed miners and goods to flow into the San Miguel town and ore to flow out to the mills and foundries elsewhere. This brought a brief but unprecedented boom to Telluride before the Panic of 1893.

Around the turn of the 20th century, there were serious labor disputes in the mines near Telluride. The Colorado National Guard was called out and there were deaths on both sides. Unions were formed as miners joined the Western Federation of Miners in 1896. 1899 brought big changes as union strike action led most mines to grant miners $3 a day for an 8-hour day's work plus a boarding pay of $1 a day (equal to $39 today). At this time, workers were putting in 10- to 12-hour days and the mines ran 24 hours a day. Work conditions were treacherous, with mines above 12,000 ft (3,700 m), a lack of safety measures, and bitter weather in winter months. Even the boarding houses were precariously placed on the mountainsides.

Telluride's labor unrest occurred against the backdrop of a statewide struggle between miners and mine owners. Bulkeley Wells was one mine operator considerably hostile to the union. The Telluride Miners' Union was led by Vincent St. John. The disappearance of mine guard William J. Barney, which Wells declared a "murder", created much intrigue and national interest. The accusations, animosity, gunplay, and expulsions that followed were part of an ongoing struggle throughout Colorado's mining communities which came to be called the Colorado Labor Wars.

In 1891, Telluride's L. L. Nunn joined forces with George Westinghouse to build the Ames Hydroelectric Generating Plant, an alternating current power station, near Telluride. The plant supplied power to the Gold King Mine 3.5 miles (5.6 km) away. This was the first successful demonstration of long-distance transmission of industrial-grade alternating current power and used two 100 hp (75 kW) Westinghouse alternators, one working as a generator producing 3,000 volts, 133 Hertz, single-phase AC, and the other used as an AC motor. This hydroelectric AC power plant predated the Westinghouse plant at Niagara Falls by four years. Nunn and his brother Paul built power plants in Colorado, Utah, Idaho, Montana, Mexico, and the Ontario Power plant at Niagara Falls on the Canadian side. Nunn developed a keen interest in education as part of his electrical power companies, and in conjunction with Cornell University built the Telluride House at Cornell in 1909 to educate promising students in electrical engineering. Later, Nunn along with Charles Walcott, started the non-profit Telluride Association. Nunn founded Deep Springs College in 1917.

Telluride's most famous historic mines are the Tomboy, Pandora, Smuggler-Union, Nellie, and Sheridan mines. Beginning in 1939, the hard-rock mining operations in the Red Mountain and Telluride mining districts began a lengthy consolidation under the Idarado Mining Company (Idarado), now a division of Newmont Mining. The consolidation ended in 1953 with Idarado's acquisition of the Telluride Mines. Idarado kept the underground workings and mill operations open at Telluride's Pandora hard-rock mine until 1978. When the mine officially closed, the snow which tormented Telluride's miners became the town's new source of income, in the form of skiing and tourism. The documentary video "the YX factor" chronicles the transition from mining to skiing and the influx of "hippies" in the late 1960s and early 1970s in the words of local residents and commentators such as Peter Yarrow and Tom Hayden.

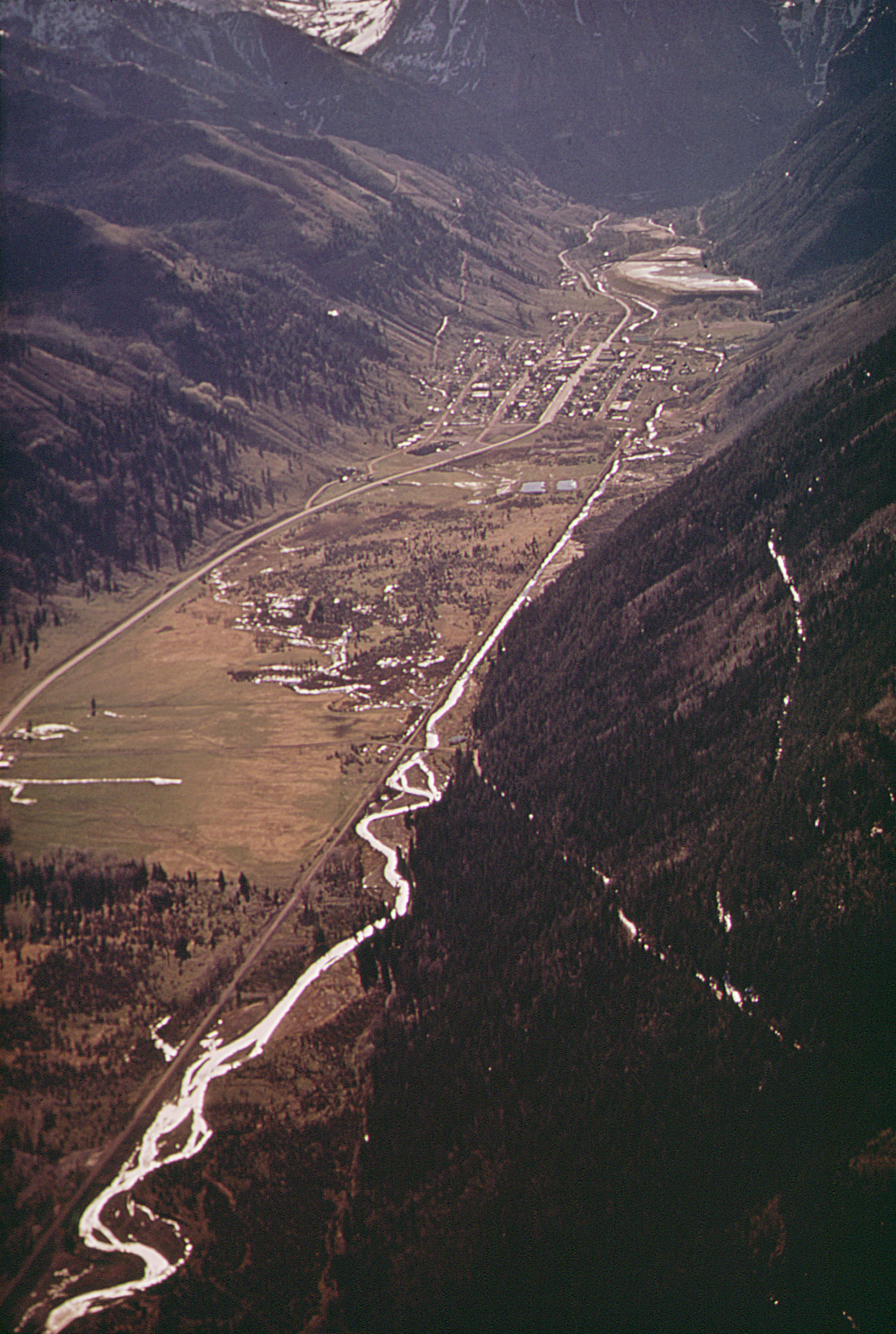
Aerial view of newly cut Boomerang Road (May 1972).

=== Skiing era ===
Mining was Telluride's only industry until 1972 when the first ski lift was installed by Telluride Ski Resort founder Joseph T. Zoline and his Telluride Ski Corporation (Telco). Zoline bought the land for the future resort in 1969 and began to craft the slopes. Along with his mountain manager, Telluride native Bill "Sr." Mahoney, they put together a plan for the sustained development of Telluride and the region. As mining phased out and a new service industry phased in, the local population changed sharply. Mining families fled Telluride to settle in places like Moab, Utah, where uranium mining offered hope of continued employment. Mining families were replaced by what locals referred to as "hippies", young people with a 1960s worldview that often clashed with the values of Telluride's old-timers. These newcomers were characterized as idle "trust funders" drawn to the town for a casual lifestyle and outdoor excitements such as hang gliding, mountain climbing, and kayaking.

The new population opposed town growth and economic expansion, including growth due to tourism and skiing. At one point, a serious effort was made to ban cars from the city limits and force visitors to use horse-drawn carts. The 1970s had fluctuating snowfalls and economic recession, but the Telluride Bluegrass Festival and the Telluride Film Festival and Mountainfilm film festival flourished. They exposed hundreds of thousands to the grandeur of the valley for the first time and created iconic associations with elite entertainers. Meanwhile, ski area founder Joe Zoline worked to develop one of the best mountains in North America for expert skiers, and created the infrastructure for tourism that respected Telluride's need to stay small.

As the final ore carts were rolling out of the Pandora mine, tourists began to discover Telluride's views, skiing, and autumn color changes. After the brutal snow drought of 1976 nearly wiped out the embryonic ski and lodging industry, the town started to rebound economically. In 1978, Ron Allred and his partner Jim Wells bought a stake in the ski area to form the Telluride Company. They expanded the infrastructure by adding a gondola connecting Telluride with the Mountain Village.

During the 1980s, Telluride developed a reputation as "Colorado's best-kept secret", which paradoxically made it one of the better-known resort communities. Wealthy skiers flocked to the mountain all winter, and sightseers kept hotel rooms full all summer. Telluride also became notorious in the drug counterculture as a drop point for Mexican smugglers and a favorite place for wealthy importers to enjoy downtime. The town was even featured in the hit song by Glenn Frey from Miami Vice, "Smugglers Blues". Telluride was living up to its Wild West history. This type of attention helped differentiate it from Aspen. The festivals and Telluride's bad-boy image attracted celebrities like Tom Cruise, Oprah Winfrey, and Oliver Stone. By the mid-1990s, Telluride had shed both its mining personality and drug image to establish itself as a premier resort town balancing modern culture with fascinating western history. In 2003, Prospect Bowl, an extension to the ski area opened, providing the resort with many new trails and runs. Most lifts in the area are high-speed quad chairs capable of holding four passengers. The highest lift on the mountain reaches 12,570 feet (3,830 m).

== Culture and the arts ==
During the summer off-ski months, Telluride hosts nationally popular music and film festivals. It has hosted the Telluride Bluegrass Festival since 1974, the Telluride Film Festival since 1974, and the Mountainfilm documentary film festival since 1979.

== Geography ==
Telluride has an elevation of 8,750 feet (2,670 m) in an isolated spot in Southwest Colorado. From the west, Colorado Route 145 is the most common way into Telluride; two other passes enter the town, Imogene Pass and Black Bear Pass.

On the eastern side of town, there are two waterfalls: Ingram Falls, which is visible from town, and Bridal Veil Falls and the Bridal Veil Hydroelectric plant, which are just out of sight from town to the right of Ingram. The power plant house was leased for some time by Eric Jacobson, who restored the house and the generator inside. The hydroelectric plant was built in 1895 to power the Smuggler-Union Mine.

The town is served by air transportation via Telluride Regional Airport (TEX), once the highest elevation commercial airport in the United States at 9,070 feet (2,760 m). The airport is considered challenging by pilots because of frequent adverse weather conditions, high elevation, and the extremely rugged mountain terrain surrounding the airport on nearly all sides. Major airline service is provided seasonally into Montrose (MTJ), approximately 70 miles (110 km) north by road.

=== Climate ===
Telluride has a humid continental climate (Dfb). The coldest month is January, averaging 18.2 °F (−7.7 °C), and the hottest July, which averages 58.7 °F (14.8 °C). Precipitation peaks as snow in winter and as thunderstorms in summer with a dry period in late spring. Telluride gets moderate precipitation all year due to its altitude, averaging 20.37 inches (517.4 mm) of water equivalent precipitation, including 130.8 inches (332.2 cm) inches of snow, each year.

Climate data for Telluride, Colorado, 1991–2020 normals, extremes 1900–present
Month	Jan	Feb	Mar	Apr	May	Jun	Jul	Aug	Sep	Oct	Nov	Dec	Year
Record high °F (°C)	58 (14)	65 (18)	75 (24)	78 (26)	83 (28)	91 (33)	96 (36)	91 (33)	88 (31)	83 (28)	73 (23)	61 (16)	96 (36)
Mean maximum °F (°C)	50.2 (10.1)	51.9 (11.1)	57.7 (14.3)	66.4 (19.1)	73.7 (23.2)	82.0 (27.8)	85.3 (29.6)	82.2 (27.9)	78.4 (25.8)	70.8 (21.6)	61.3 (16.3)	51.4 (10.8)	86.0 (30.0)
Mean daily maximum °F (°C)	36.2 (2.3)	37.6 (3.1)	43.7 (6.5)	50.8 (10.4)	60.4 (15.8)	72.5 (22.5)	76.7 (24.8)	74.1 (23.4)	68.0 (20.0)	57.4 (14.1)	45.4 (7.4)	36.2 (2.3)	54.9 (12.7)
Daily mean °F (°C)	18.2 (−7.7)	21.5 (−5.8)	28.3 (−2.1)	36.4 (2.4)	44.6 (7.0)	53.3 (11.8)	58.7 (14.8)	57.2 (14.0)	50.8 (10.4)	40.4 (4.7)	29.0 (−1.7)	19.0 (−7.2)	38.1 (3.4)
Mean daily minimum °F (°C)	0.3 (−17.6)	5.3 (−14.8)	12.9 (−10.6)	22.0 (−5.6)	28.8 (−1.8)	34.2 (1.2)	40.7 (4.8)	40.2 (4.6)	33.6 (0.9)	23.4 (−4.8)	12.6 (−10.8)	1.8 (−16.8)	21.3 (−5.9)
Mean minimum °F (°C)	−17.0 (−27.2)	−12.3 (−24.6)	−5.8 (−21.0)	9.4 (−12.6)	19.0 (−7.2)	26.5 (−3.1)	32.8 (0.4)	33.0 (0.6)	22.9 (−5.1)	10.4 (−12.0)	−7.4 (−21.9)	−15.1 (−26.2)	−19.7 (−28.7)
Record low °F (°C)	−32 (−36)	−36 (−38)	−24 (−31)	−10 (−23)	3 (−16)	15 (−9)	26 (−3)	22 (−6)	9 (−13)	−3 (−19)	−22 (−30)	−31 (−35)	−36 (−38)
Average precipitation inches (mm)	1.45 (37)	1.38 (35)	1.61 (41)	1.71 (43)	1.60 (41)	0.85 (22)	2.37 (60)	2.60 (66)	2.34 (59)	1.56 (40)	1.53 (39)	1.37 (35)	20.37 (518)
Average snowfall inches (cm)	23.6 (60)	22.0 (56)	22.7 (58)	13.1 (33)	5.1 (13)	0.3 (0.76)	0.0 (0.0)	0.0 (0.0)	0.7 (1.8)	5.3 (13)	18.7 (47)	19.3 (49)	130.8 (331.56)
Average extreme snow depth inches (cm)	21.3 (54)	23.2 (59)	21.5 (55)	10.3 (26)	3.0 (7.6)	0.3 (0.76)	0.0 (0.0)	0.0 (0.0)	0.3 (0.76)	3.4 (8.6)	9.9 (25)	12.8 (33)	26.4 (67)
Average precipitation days (≥ 0.01 in)	9.9	9.6	9.9	9.5	9.1	5.3	12.7	14.9	11.0	8.3	7.8	9.2	117.2
Average snowy days (≥ 0.1 in)	9.5	9.2	8.5	6.1	1.9	0.1	0.0	0.0	0.3	2.1	6.3	9.1	53.1
Source 1: NOAA
Source 2: National Weather Service

== Demographics ==
Historical population
Census	Pop.	Note	%±
1890	766		—
1900	2,446		219.3%
1910	1,756		−28.2%
1920	1,618		−7.9%
1930	512		−68.4%
1940	1,337		161.1%
1950	1,101		−17.7%
1960	677		−38.5%
1970	553		−18.3%
1980	1,047		89.3%
1990	1,309		25.0%
2000	2,221		69.7%
2010	2,325		4.7%
2020	2,607		12.1%
U.S. Decennial Census

=== 2020 census ===
As of the 2020 census, Telluride had a population of 2,607. The median age was 38.0 years. 17.2% of residents were under the age of 18 and 11.0% of residents were 65 years of age or older. For every 100 females there were 109.6 males, and for every 100 females age 18 and over there were 109.4 males age 18 and over.

97.9% of residents lived in urban areas, while 2.1% lived in rural areas.

There were 1,207 households in Telluride, of which 23.3% had children under the age of 18 living in them. Of all households, 31.5% were married-couple households, 30.5% were households with a male householder and no spouse or partner present, and 26.8% were households with a female householder and no spouse or partner present. About 36.4% of all households were made up of individuals and 7.6% had someone living alone who was 65 years of age or older.

There were 2,265 housing units, of which 46.7% were vacant. The homeowner vacancy rate was 5.1% and the rental vacancy rate was 23.0%.

Racial composition as of the 2020 census
Race	Number	Percent
White	2,201	84.4%
Black or African American	5	0.2%
American Indian and Alaska Native	36	1.4%
Asian	26	1.0%
Native Hawaiian and Other Pacific Islander	0	0.0%
Some other race	176	6.8%
Two or more races	163	6.3%
Hispanic or Latino (of any race)	341	13.1%

=== 2000 census ===
As of the census of 2000, there were 2,221 people, 1,013 households, and 357 families residing in the town. The population density was 3,143.3 people per square mile (1,213.6 people/km^{2}). There were 1,938 housing units at an average density of 2,742.8 per square mile (1,059.0/km^{2}). The racial makeup of the town was 92.57% White, 0.81% Native American, 0.72% Asian, 0.41% African American, 4.14% from other races, and 1.35% from two or more races. Hispanic or Latino of any race were 7.20% of the population.

There were 1,013 households, out of which 19.1% had children under the age of 18 living with them, 25.2% were married couples living together, 6.1% had a female householder with no husband present, and 64.7% were non-families. 31.9% of all households were made up of individuals, and 1.6% had someone living alone who was 65 years of age or older. The average household size was 2.19 and the average family size was 2.79.

In the town, the population was spread out, with 14.3% under the age of 18, 12.2% from 18 to 24, 50.9% from 25 to 44, 20.8% from 45 to 64, and 1.9% who were 65 years of age or older. The median age was 31 years. For every 100 females, there were 122.8 males. For every 100 females aged 18 and over, there were 127.4 males.

The median income for a household in the town was $51,938, and the median income for a family was $66,136. Males had a median income of $35,329 versus $30,096 for females. The per capita income for the town was $38,832. About 8.5% of families and 11.5% of the population were below the poverty line, including 16.2% of those under age 18 and 6.9% of those aged 65 or over.

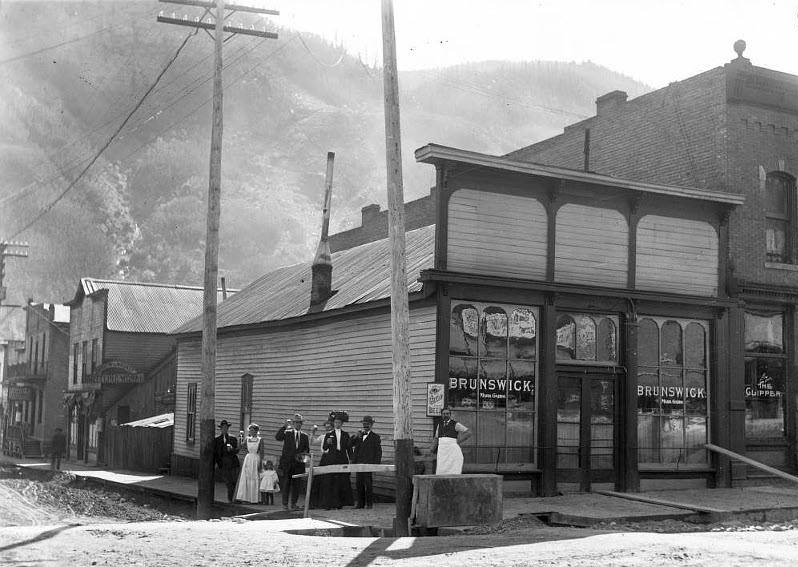
Brunswick Saloon, Telluride, circa 1900

== Transportation ==
Telluride is served by Telluride Regional Airport. Scheduled flight options are limited, due to the airport's somewhat short runway and frequent closures under bad weather, so most passengers going to Telluride use Montrose Regional Airport, 67 miles (108 km) to the north.

Free public transportation is provided in Telluride. The bus system, called Galloping Goose, makes a complete loop around the town. A gondola lift links Telluride with Mountain Village.

Telluride's free gondola is the only one of its kind in North America. It stops at four stations: Telluride, St. Sophia, and two stops in Mountain Village. It was the first leg of a transportation agreement for the Telluride Region that was stipulated as part of the Mountain Village zoning expansion that would provide free gondola service from the Town of Telluride and the Mountain Village to the Aldasoro Development, the West Meadows Development, the Valley Floor Development, and the West Meadows Development to virtually eliminate the use or need for a car in the Telluride Region of San Miguel County. It is a 13-minute ride and reaches an elevation of 10,540 feet (3,210 m) at the San Sophia station.

Regional bus service is provided by the San Miguel Authority for Regional Transportation (SMART).

Telluride is part of Colorado's Bustang intercity bus service network. It is on the Durango-Grand Junction Outrider line.

Major highways

- State Highway 145 is part of the San Juan Skyway. It connects Telluride to Cortez and Naturita. This road also gives access to State Highway 62, the main route to Denver, Montrose and other important places in Colorado.

== Education ==
It is in the Telluride School District.

== In popular culture ==
American heavy metal band Pantera’s 1990 Cowboys from Hell album cover includes a picture taken in 1910 of what was called the “Cosmopolitan Saloon” in Telluride with the bandmembers pasted over it.

Clive Cussler's 1998 novel Atlantis Found is partially set in Telluride. The novel features signs of an ancient civilization being found in an underground chamber next to a mine outside the city.

In Justin Cronin's 2010 novel The Passage, Telluride is the site of a secret military compound used to test a purported "longevity drug" on death row inmates.

The production of The Hateful Eight directed by Quentin Tarantino began filming near Telluride in January 2015.

The Coen brothers 2018 film The Ballad of Buster Scruggs used Telluride as a filming location for the vignette "All Gold Canyon", based on a short story by Jack London.

The Kia Telluride SUV is named after the town.

== See also ==
- Telluride Daily Planet
- Real World/Road Rules Challenge: The Gauntlet
- Telluride Sessions
