= Telluride Ski Resort =

Ski area in Colorado, United States

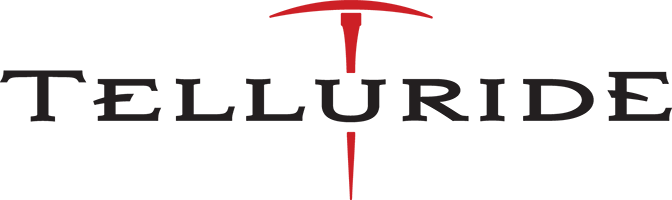

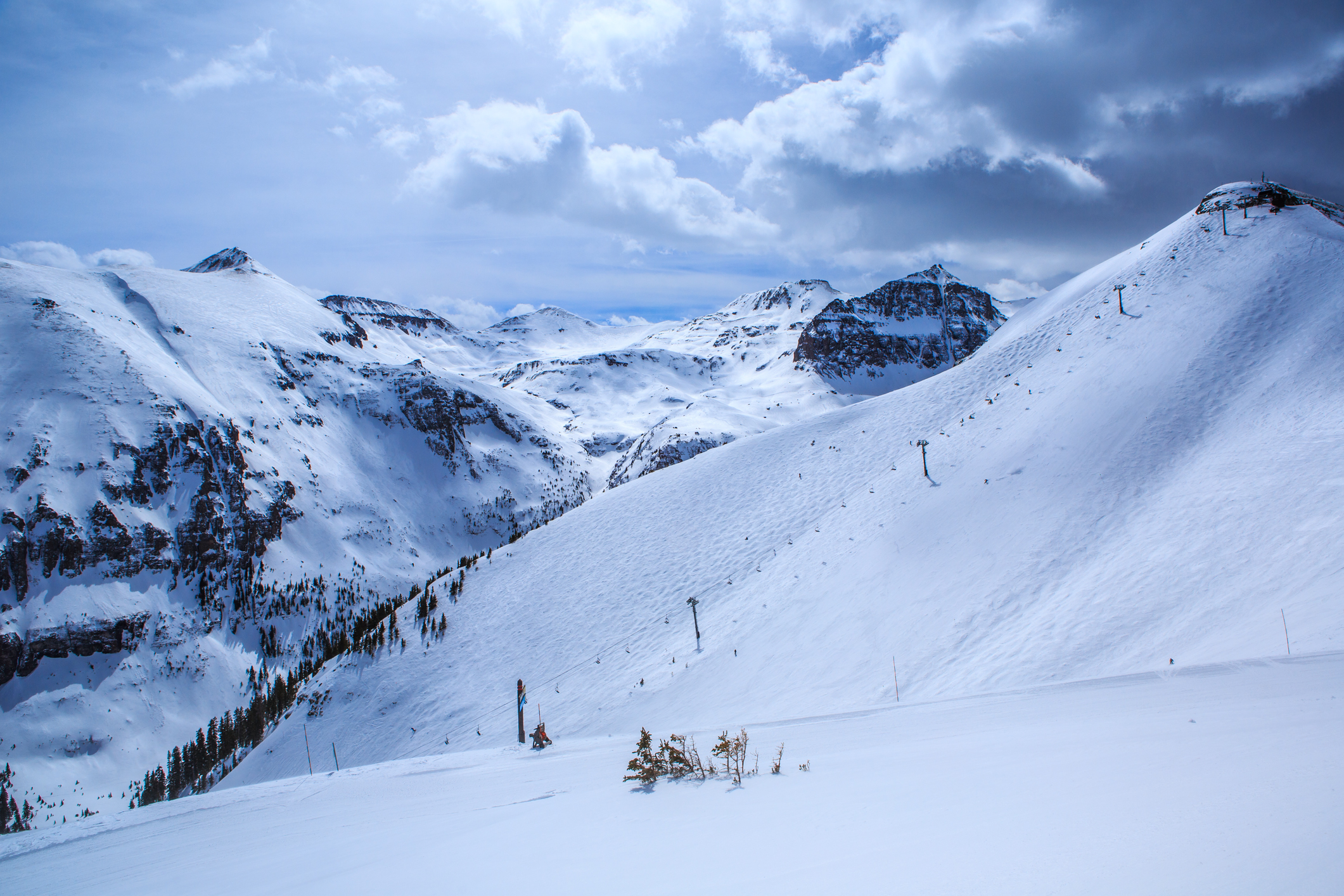
- A lift at the Telluride Ski Resort in 2013

- Location in Colorado Telluride Ski Resort (the United States)
- Location: Telluride, Colorado, United States
- Nearest city: Montrose, Colorado
- Coordinates: 37°56′11″N 107°49′13″W
- Status: Operating
- Vertical: 4,425 ft (1,349 m) including hike-to 3,845 ft (1,172 m) lift-served
- Top elevation: 13,150 ft (4,010 m)
- Base elevation: 8,725 ft (2,659 m)
- Skiable area: 2,000 acres (8.1 km^{2})
- Trails: 127; 23% beginner 36% intermediate 41% advanced/expert
- Longest run: "Galloping Goose" – 4.6 miles (7.4 km)
- Lift system: 2 gondolas (8); 12 chairlifts – 7 hi-speed quads – 1 quad – 2 triples – 2 doubles 2 surface lifts 2 magic carpets
- Lift capacity: 22,386 skiers per hour
- Terrain parks: 3
- Snowfall: 330 in/year (838 cm/year)
- Snowmaking: Yes
- Night skiing: none
- Website: http://tellurideskiresort.com

Telluride Ski Resort is a ski resort located in Mountain Village, southwest Colorado, United States.

The resort is located in the northwestern San Juan Mountains, part of the Rocky Mountains, and is home to the highest concentration of 13,000- and 14,000-foot peaks in North America. Telluride Ski Resort has over 2,000 skiable acres and spans between the historic town of Telluride, Colorado, and the modern alpine community of Mountain Village, Colorado.

Known for its advanced terrain, Telluride also has over 50% beginner and intermediate runs.

== History ==
Joe Zoline, a businessman, bought two ranches – Adam's Ranch and Gorrono Ranch – located on the mountain in 1968.

Zoline hired Emile Allais, a French Olympic skier, to help consult on the design and layout of the mountain, and environmental planners. The Ski Area started in 1970–71. Five lifts were constructed, and the Telluride Ski School was founded in conjunction with the mountain's opening. The Telluride Ski Resort's Master Plan was developed by the architectural firm of MacAllister, Rinehart, and Ring and the resort officially opened on December 22, 1972.

=== Allred and Wells Ownership Era ===
Two Colorado Natives, Ron Allred and Jim Wells of the Benchmark Corporation in Avon, Colorado, purchased the ski area from Joe Zoline in 1978. That year, Annie Savath was named Director of The Telluride Ski School. Allred and Wells later created the Gondola and Chondola (public transportation systems) and the Prospect Bowl.

In the 1981–82 ski season, Telluride created the first snowmaking system.

Growth in the region between 1984 and 1986 included the opening of the Telluride Regional Airport (TEX) and the start of construction on the Mountain Village. The ski run "The Plunge" was officially created along with "Kant-Mak-M" and "Mammoth", on the front face. "Pick-N-Gad" and "O'Reilly's" were cut.

Mountain Village, Colorado, was founded in 1987 and incorporated in 1995 as a home rule municipality. The addition of an 18-hole golf course in Mountain Village in 1992 transformed the Telluride Ski Area into the Telluride Ski & Golf Company. In 1994, the resort built new corporate offices, various facilities for mountain operations, golf, and skiers services, and Big Billie's, a restaurant and 150-unit employee housing complex at the base of Chondola Lift 1. The free pedestrian gondola opened on December 20, 1996. The Telluride Conference Center is under the management of Telluride Ski and Golf and is host to multiple events and live music in addition to conferences.

Allred's, the resort's flagship restaurant, opened its doors in 2000.

=== Morita Ownership Era ===
By March 2001, Morita had acquired 100 percent of the Telluride Ski and Golf Company (TSG). The resort added 733 acres of beginner, intermediate, and expert terrain with the opening of Prospect Bowl between 2000 and 2002.

=== 2004 to present ===
In February 2004, the resort transferred its ownership to Chuck Horning, a real estate investor from Newport Beach, California, who remains the current owner today. The 2004/2005 winter saw the opening of Mountain Quail with a snowboarding program.

The high-altitude private home, Tempter House, was purchased by the resort in 2006. Tempter House is currently a rental.

In winter 2007–2008, they opened the Black Iron Bowl. Eight new runs and 1,100 feet of vertical were opened for public access adjacent to the Prospect Bowl. Palmyra Peak and the Gold Hill Chutes 1 & 6–10 opened to the public for the first time in January 2008. The following winter, Telluride Ski and Golf continued their terrain expansion with the opening of Revelation Bowl, located on a northeastern aspect that naturally gathers huge amounts of snow and is directly off the back side of Gold Hill.

In winter 2009, Telluride Ski Resort announced Gold Hill Chutes 2–5 would open for full public access to Gold Hill Chutes 1–10. Alpino Vino opened this season. This eatery sits on the See Forever Run at 11,966 feet.

In the spring of 2013, Telluride Ski & Golf purchased the luxury boutique hotel The Inn at Lost Creek.

In July 2015, Telluride Ski and Golf purchased all of the retail space (73,000+ square feet) within the Peaks Resort and Spa and assumed the management of hotel operations and the HOA. The Peaks Resort and Spa is a ski-in/ski-out, full-service hotel located adjacent to the Telluride Ski & Golf Club.

From December 27, 2025, to January 8, 2026, the resort was shut down due to a ski patrol strike.

== Features ==
The mountain itself covers the face facing the town of Telluride as well as goes over onto the other side (Revelation Bowl). Telluride has a total of 120 runs and 2,000+ acres (810+ hectares) of skiable terrain. 23% of Telluride's runs are ranked at Beginner, 36% Intermediate and 41% Advanced / Expert. Telluride on average receives over 300 inches (789 cm) of snow each winter season.

=== Slope aspects ===
- North: 50%
- South: 7%
- West: 33%
- East: 10%

Telluride Ski has increased its skiing area. These have been:

=== Prospect Bowl (2002) ===
The Prospect Bowl almost doubled the area of skiable terrain and opened in 2002.

=== Black Iron Bowl (2007) ===
For the 2007–08 ski season, the resort opened the Black Iron Bowl.

=== Revelation Bowl (2008) ===
The Telluride ski resort in the summer of 2008 installed a fixed grip quad.

== Photographs ==
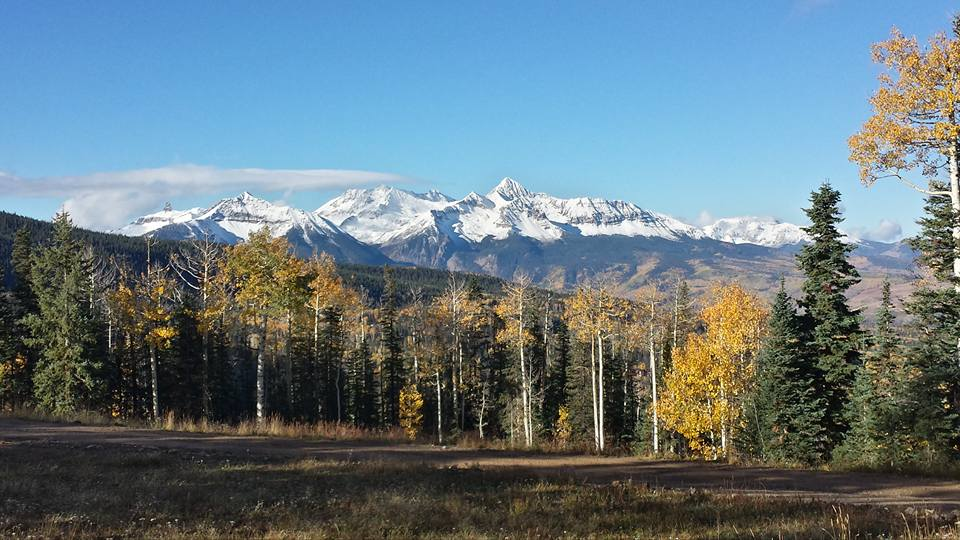
Views from San Sophia, Gondola Mid-Station

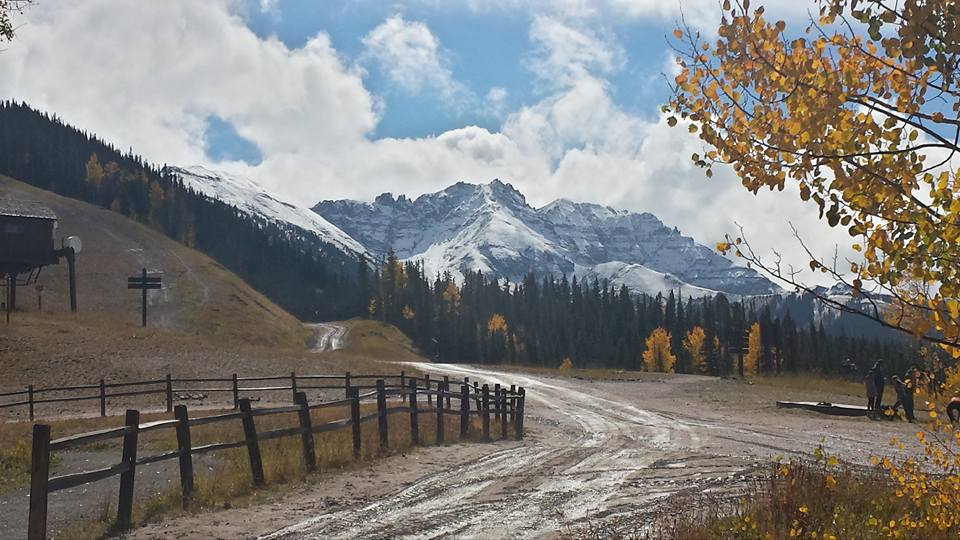
Views of Palmyra Peak from Gondola Mid-Station

== See also ==
- Telluride, Colorado
- Mountain Village, Colorado
