= Oline (name) =

Oline is a female given name of Norwegian origin, a possible variant of Ole (name) and Olin (name). Notable people with the name include:

- Oline Pind Muus (c. 1879), Norwegian woman known as subject of a publicized US divorce case
- Gunhild Oline Hagestad (born 1942), Norwegian sociologist

== See also ==
- Caroline Woolmer Leakey (1827–1881), known by her pen name "Oliné Keese," English writer
