= Ohlin =

Ohlin is a Swedish surname. Notable people with the surname include:

- Alix Ohlin, Canadian writer
- Axel Ohlin (1867–1903), Swedish zoologist and explorer
- Bertil Ohlin (1899–1979), Swedish economist and politician, coauthor of Ohlin Report
- Jens David Ohlin (born 1974), American legal academic and university administrator
- Jörgen Ohlin (1937–2013), Swedish footballer
- Lisa Ohlin (born 1960), Swedish screenwriter and director
- Lloyd Ohlin (1918–2008), American sociologist and criminologist
- Mattias Ohlin (born 1978), Swedish swimmer
- Nils Ohlin (1895–1958), Swedish actor
- Per "Dead" Ohlin (1969–1991), Swedish singer
- Sture Ohlin (1935–2023), Swedish biathlon competitor

== See also ==
- Ohlin Island, island of Antarctica
- Heckscher–Ohlin (disambiguation)
