= Joseph T. Zoline =

Joseph T. Zoline (September 5, 1912 – September 23, 2004) was the founder and developer of Telluride Ski Resort. He was born in Chicago, the child of Russian immigrants, he went on to work his way through the University of Chicago where he gained highest honors both as an undergraduate and at the Law School. In 1939 Zoline married Janice "Jebby" Kahnweiler.

He rose to the top of his profession as a corporation lawyer. This opened other business opportunities, and he became the chief executive for several corporations, including Carte Blanche, one of the first credit cards, MSL Industries, and Chicago's Arlington Race Track.

In 1968, when Zoline first came to Telluride, the town was a shadow of its former self. The population was under 500. Zoline set about developing the Telluride Ski Resort; planning, designing and building the runs, planning and erecting the lifts, developing the much needed bed base, developing the ski patrol, ski school, general staff, on-mountain facilities, ticketing, marketing, early real estate planning and development, steering the whole complex financial entity through the hard days of national economic downturn were only some of the moving parts that had to be managed.

He and Jebby spent most of this period in Telluride. Zoline took the greatest care in every aspect of planning and execution, from 1968 when he began, to 1978 when he sold to Ron Allred and his partner in Benchmark Companies, A.J. (Jim) Wells.

Zoline hired French Olympian skier Emile Allais to scope out the ferociously difficult terrain and resolve lifts and runs into a coherent ski mountain. Additionally, he hired ecologists and environmental planners to protect the mountain.
