= Heckscher–Ohlin =

Heckscher–Ohlin can refer to:

- Heckscher–Ohlin model, a general equilibrium mathematical model of international trade
- Heckscher–Ohlin theorem, one of the four critical theorems of the Heckscher–Ohlin model
