= Joseph Olpin House =

Historic house in Utah, United States

- U.S. National Register of Historic Places
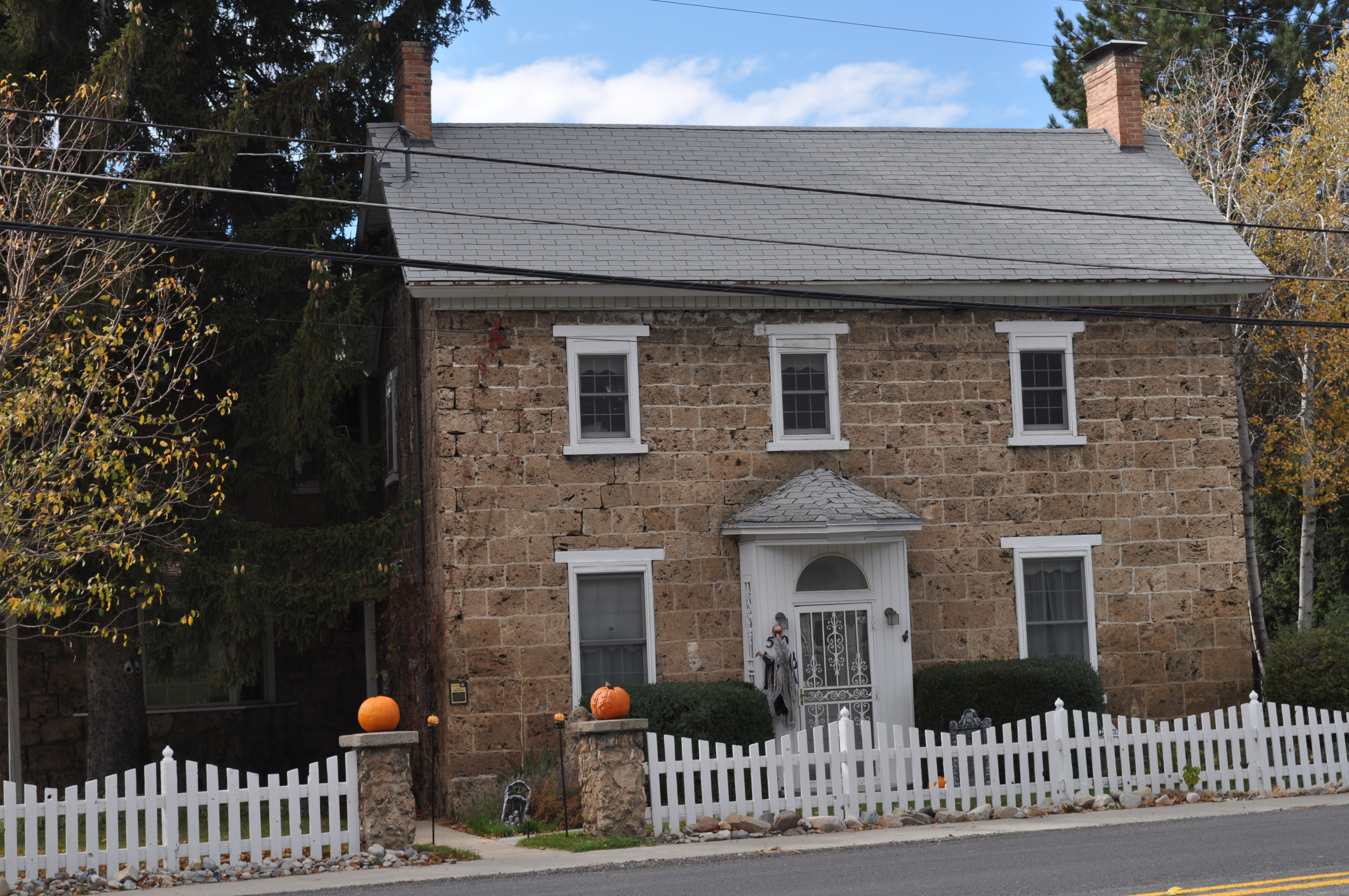

- Location within Utah Location within the United States
- Location: 510 Locust Ave., Pleasant Grove, Utah
- Coordinates: 40°21′28″N 111°43′41″W
- Area: less than one acre
- Built: 1875
- Built by: Olphin, Joseph
- MPS: Pleasant Grove Soft-Rock Buildings TR (AD)
- NRHP reference No.: 77001320
- Added to NRHP: November 7, 1977

The Joseph Olpin House at 510 Locust Ave. in Pleasant Grove, Utah, United States, was built in 1874 or 1875, by Joseph Olpin, a skilled mason. It has also been known as the Edward L. Platt Residence. It was listed on the National Register of Historic Places in 1977.

It is a two-story rectangular building built of stone with a brick one-and-a-half story rear addition. Its symmetrical front is three bays wide, and has wooden lintels above its six-over-six windows. It has two gable end chimneys. The one-and-a-half-story brick addition is of broken saltbox form, with brick laid in stretcher bond. The addition's rear door and window bays have segmented arches.
