= Olin Dunbar Wheeler =

American historian, author and topographer

- Born: May 1, 1852; Mansfield, Ohio
- Died: September 10, 1925 (aged 73); St. Paul, Minnesota
- Education: Cornell University
- Occupations: Historian, author, topographer
- Notable credit(s): Wonderland (1886), The Trail of Lewis and Clark (1904)
- Spouse: Anna E. S. Burr
- Parent(s): Alfred and Lydia Curtis Wheeler

Olin Dunbar Wheeler (May 1, 1852 – September 10, 1925) was an American historian, author and topographer.

== Early life ==
Olin Wheeler was born May 1, 1852, in Mansfield, Ohio, to parents Reverend Alfred Wheeler and Lydia Curtis Wheeler. His brother Edward Jewett Wheeler later became the editor of The Literary Digest and Current History. Wheeler was educated at Baldwin University and Allegheny College. In 1874, Wheeler graduated with a degree in Civil Engineering from Cornell University.

== Western exploration ==
Upon graduating from Cornell in 1874, Wheeler obtained employment with the Geographical and Geological Survey of the Rocky Mountain Region headed by geologist John Wesley Powell. In 1876, Wheeler was the assistant to John H. Renshawe, working on topographical surveys in southwestern Utah and southeastern Nevada. In 1877, Wheeler was the assistant of Professor A. H. Thompson who headed the triangulation party of the survey. The party operated in the region west of the Green River. Wheeler continued with the Powell survey until its conclusion in 1879.

After leaving the survey Wheeler obtained an appointment to work on the tenth United States census in Washington, D.C. During summer months he was the disbursing officer at Virginia City, Nevada, and during the winters he was engaged in special census work at the Capital. He gained valuable experience as a special correspondent for various newspapers, writing on Congressional matters and public events.

In 1882 Wheeler married Anna E. S. Burr of Mount Vernon, Ohio, and settled in St. Paul, Minnesota, under the employment of Elias F. Drake, a prominent businessman. Wheeler held this position until June, 1892.

== Northern Pacific Railroad ==
In June 1892, Olin Wheeler was hired by the Northern Pacific Railroad to head its advertising, a position he held for 16 years. In 1893, he authored the first of many editions of the annual NPR travel guide, Wonderland which highlighted attractions along the route of the railroad in the west, including Yellowstone National Park and Alaska. He authored at least 19 books on behalf of the railroad, including at least 13 in the Wonderland series from 1893 to 1906.

== Lewis and Clark ==
Olin Wheeler published a two volume work The Trail of Lewis and Clark 1804-1904 in 1904 based upon actual travel over the trail. He was the first historian to produce a significant work about the Lewis and Clark Expedition. Wheeler's book gave the general public his personal impressions of the story of the expedition, the waters they navigated and the land they traversed. The volumes contained two hundred illustrations and numerous images of important expedition scenes and landmarks photographed by the various professional photographers who accompanied him in his retracings of the route.

The identities of only a few of those photographers are known, including L. A. Huffman of Miles City, Montana, who was a protégé of Frank J. Haynes. A few images are in the Edward Ayer Collection at the Newberry Library in Chicago, but an intensive search for original prints or negatives of the remaining photos included in The Trail has been fruitless.

== Retirement and death ==
Though Wheeler left the Northern Pacific Railroad in 1908, he remained somewhat active in retirement. He joined the Minnesota Historical Society in 1903, and served on their executive council from 1905 until his death. In 1924, Wheeler was appointed historian of the Veterans’ Association of the Northern Pacific Railway. He intended to personally re-trace the path of Meriwether Lewis' 1806 return trip through the Marias River basin in the summer of 1925, but was too ill to attend a tour planned by the Upper Missouri Historical Expedition for that purpose. He died September 10, 1925.

== Works ==
- Wonderland series, written for the Northern Pacific Railroad Company
  - Wheeler, Olin Dunbar (1893). 6,000 miles through wonderland : being a description of the marvelous region traversed by the Northern Pacific Railroad. Northern Pacific Railroad Company. Chicago: Rand, McNally, & Co.
  - —— (1894). Indianland and wonderland. Northern Pacific Railroad Company. Chicago: Rand, McNally, & Co.
  - —— (1895). Sketches of wonderland. Northern Pacific Railroad Company. Chicago: Rand, McNally, & Co.
  - —— (1896). Wonderland '96. St. Paul: Northern Pacific Railroad Company.
  - —— (1897). Wonderland '97. St. Paul: Northern Pacific Railroad Company.
  - —— (1898). Wonderland '98. St. Paul: Northern Pacific Railroad Company.
  - —— (1900). Wonderland 1900. St. Paul: Northern Pacific Railroad Company.
  - —— (1901). Wonderland 1901. St. Paul: Northern Pacific Railroad Company.
  - —— (1902). Wonderland 1902. St. Paul: Northern Pacific Railroad Company.
  - —— (1903). Wonderland 1903. St. Paul: Northern Pacific Railroad Company.
  - —— (1904). Wonderland 1904. St. Paul: Northern Pacific Railroad Company.
  - —— (1905). Wonderland 1905. St. Paul: Northern Pacific Railroad Company.
  - —— (1906). Wonderland 1906. St. Paul: Northern Pacific Railroad Company.
- —— (1901). The history of a trade-mark. St. Paul: Northern Pacific Railroad Company.
- —— (1901). Yellowstone National Park : descriptive of the beauties and wonders of the world's wonderland. St. Paul: W. C. Riley.
- —— (1904). The trail of Lewis and Clark, 1804-1904; a story of the great exploration across the continent in 1804-6. New York, London: G.P. Putnam's Sons.
- —— (1905). The Lewis & Clark Exposition, Portland, Oregon, June 1 to October 15, 1905 (Fifth ed.). St. Paul: Northern Pacific Railroad Company.
- —— (1906). Eastward through the storied northwest. St. Paul: Northern Pacific Railroad Company.
  - —— (1909). Eastward through the storied northwest (1909 ed.). St. Paul: Northern Pacific Railroad Company.
