= Mountain Village, Colorado =

Town in Colorado, United States

- Home rule town
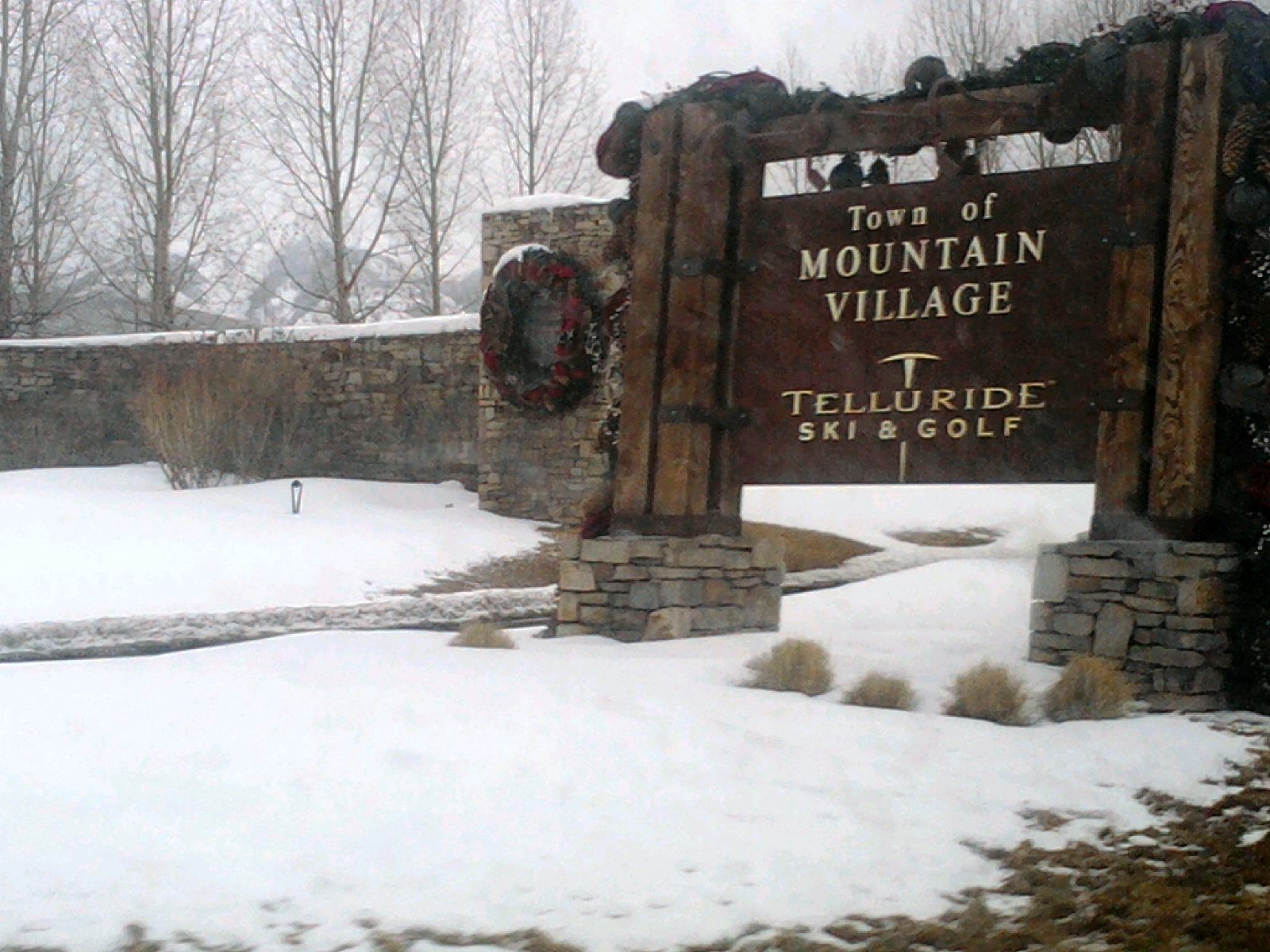
- Welcome sign to Mountain Village

- Location of Mountain Village in San Miguel County, Colorado
- Coordinates: 37°56′08″N 107°51′55″W
- Country: United States
- State: Colorado
- Incorporated (town): March 10, 1995

Government
  - Type: Home rule municipality

Area
  - Total: 3.30 sq mi (8.55 km^{2})
  - Land: 3.30 sq mi (8.55 km^{2})
  - Water: 0 sq mi (0.00 km^{2})
- Elevation: 9,512 ft (2,899 m)

Population (2020)
  - Total: 1,264
  - Density: 383/sq mi (148/km^{2})
- Time zone: UTC-7 (Mountain (MST))
  - Summer (DST): UTC-6 (MDT)
- ZIP Code: 81435
- Area code: 970
- FIPS code: 08-52550
- GNIS feature ID: 2413024
- Website: townofmountainvillage.com

Mountain Village is a home rule municipality in San Miguel County, southwestern Colorado. It is located just southwest of Telluride, Colorado in the San Juan Mountains. The elevation of the town rises above Telluride to 9,600 feet. The population was 1,264 at the 2020 census.

== Geography ==
According to the United States Census Bureau, the town has a total area of 3.3 square miles (8.6 km^{2}), all land.

== Demographics ==
Historical population
| Census | Pop. | Note | %± |
|---|---|---|---|
| 2000 | 978 | | — |
| 2010 | 1,320 | | 35.0% |
| 2020 | 1,264 | | −4.2% |

=== 2020 census ===
As of the 2020 census, Mountain Village had a population of 1,264. The median age was 35.0 years. 15.2% of residents were under the age of 18 and 9.5% of residents were 65 years of age or older. For every 100 females there were 123.7 males, and for every 100 females age 18 and over there were 115.7 males age 18 and over.

100.0% of residents lived in urban areas, while 0.0% lived in rural areas.

There were 652 households in Mountain Village, of which 21.0% had children under the age of 18 living in them. Of all households, 29.9% were married-couple households, 33.0% were households with a male householder and no spouse or partner present, and 28.2% were households with a female householder and no spouse or partner present. About 43.4% of all households were made up of individuals and 4.2% had someone living alone who was 65 years of age or older.

There were 1,707 housing units, of which 61.8% were vacant. The homeowner vacancy rate was 4.7% and the rental vacancy rate was 15.3%.

Racial composition as of the 2020 census
| Race | Number | Percent |
|---|---|---|
| White | 1,009 | 79.8% |
| Black or African American | 6 | 0.5% |
| American Indian and Alaska Native | 6 | 0.5% |
| Asian | 22 | 1.7% |
| Native Hawaiian and Other Pacific Islander | 0 | 0.0% |
| Some other race | 101 | 8.0% |
| Two or more races | 120 | 9.5% |
| Hispanic or Latino (of any race) | 223 | 17.6% |

== Education ==
It is in the Telluride School District.

== See also ==
- Telluride Ski Resort
