= Floyd Smith (physician) =

American doctor

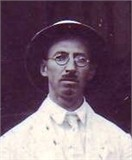
- Smith in 1918
- Born: Floyd Olin Smith; December 1, 1885; Rowley, Iowa, United States
- Died: August 6, 1961 (aged 75); Felton, California, United States
- Occupations: Medical doctor and Christian missionary
- Known for: Witness to the Armenian Genocide

Floyd Olin Smith (December 1, 1885 – August 6, 1961) was an American physician who served in the Ottoman Empire (1913–1917) and the Philippines (1918–1927) under Near East Relief and the Red Cross.

During his time in the Ottoman Empire, Smith was a caretaker of many Armenians who were victims of the Armenian genocide. He wrote extensively about the treatment of his patients and provided detailed medical assessments of each of them. Smith later worked in the Philippines for nine years, and remained in there for another thirty years. During World War II, he was captured by Japanese forces and was held as a prisoner of war. He returned to the United States where he spent the rest of his life.

== Early life ==
Floyd Smith was born on December 1, 1885, in Rowley, Iowa to parents Arthur and Jane Smith. After attaining a Bachelor of Science degree from Lenox College in 1907, Smith continued his studies at the University of Iowa where he attained his medical degree in 1911. He served as an intern at the Iowa Methodist Hospital in Des Moines. He married Bessie Heath in Hopkinton, Iowa on 4 October 1912.

Floyd Olin Smith prior to leaving to the Ottoman Empire

== Work in the Ottoman Empire ==
Floyd Smith was sent to the Ottoman Empire by the American Board of Commissioners for Foreign Missions (ABCFM). He sailed from Boston on 31 December 1912 and initially settled in Paris, France where he remained there for six months in order to learn French. Smith then arrived in the Ottoman Empire in 1913 where he passed medical examinations in Constantinople.

After he was briefly sent to Jerusalem he was then transferred to Aintab (today Gaziantep) located in the eastern provinces of the Empire. While in Aintab, Floyd and Bessie Smith had a child named Arthur. However, both Floyd and Bessie became gravely ill. After making a recovery, Floyd Smith moved to Kharpert (today Harput) where he united with other missionaries.

By this time, his correspondence with relatives in the United States suggested that war was about to begin. In one letter, Smith noted that the conscription of Armenians into the military caused much anxiety within the Armenian community while the Turks, on the other hand, were similarly dissatisfied with the policy.

Smith was later transferred to Diyarbakir in October 1914. During his time there he was unable to continue corresponding. With the outbreak of World War I, the local British consulate in Diyarbakir entrusted Smith with the archives of the consulate. The archives were to be transferred to the American consulate for security purposes. However, Smith, along with a nurse, decided to burn the archives.

=== Treating victims of the Armenian genocide ===
When a typhus outbreak occurred in Diyarbakir, Smith was assigned to treat the provincial governor, Hamdi Bey. By this time, Hamdi Bey had a tolerant view towards the local Armenian population. However, fearing that he might lose his post as governor due to his tolerance, he ordered the arrest of many Armenians he believed would cause disturbances. Nevertheless, Hamdi Bey was still branded as someone who favored the Armenians and was subsequently removed from his post and replaced by Mehmed Reshid Bey in March 1915.

In 1914, the Ottoman Empire entered World War I on the side of the Central Powers and fighting erupted at the border against Russia. In early spring of 1915, the Russians advanced successfully into Ottoman territory and the quick march of their army toward Diyarbakir, according to Turkish historian Uğur Ümit Üngör, must have confirmed Reshid's "apocalyptic fear" of the Russians and perceptions that all Armenians were Russian spies.

Floyd Smith managed to establish contact with the new governor in the first few weeks of his governorship. However, the governor then prohibited Smith from visiting him. Dr. Smith asserted, "Diyarbakir is an interior province with extremely few foreigners—an ideal setup to find out how to solve the Troublesome Armenian problem: Massacre and Deportation, or both combined. Talaat, Enver, and Jemal were fiends from hell itself." By this time, the deportations of the Armenians in Diyarbakir had already begun and there were mass arrests of Armenian men throughout the city. Smith described that during the arrests, many belongings were confiscated and sexual assaults towards women were rampant. Smith also remarked how the Armenian male population was disarmed and subjugated to torture:

The vali was superseded early in March. By getting a large force of police and gendarmes the new vali [Reshid] succeeded in apprehending the larger part of these men. He soon started the imprisonment of prominent Armenians using as justification the false statement that they were sheltering deserters. Most people had weapons in their houses in remembrance of the event of twenty years ago, but I feel positive that there was no idea of a general uprising. About the first of April a proclamation was posted demanding arms. Men were imprisoned right and left and tortured to make them confess the presence and place of concealments of arms. Some went mad under the torture.

Mehmed Reshid would eventually be known for organizing the annihilation of the Armenian communities of Diyarbekir, earning him the nickname the "butcher of Diyarbakir". He had persuaded himself that the native Armenian population was conspiring against the Ottoman state and he had accordingly drawn up plans for the "solution of the Armenian question." In his memoirs, Reshid recounted his first days as governor:

My appointment to Diyarbekir coincided with a very delicate period of the war. Large parts of Van and Bitlis had been invaded by the enemy [i.e., the Russians], deserters were transgressing, pillaging and robbing everywhere. Yezidi and Nestorian uprisings in or at the border of the province required the application of drastic measures. The transgressional, offensive and impudent attitude of the Armenians was seriously endangering the honor of the government.

Over the next two months, the Armenians of the province were targeted in an extermination campaign through wholesale massacres and deportations. According to the Venezuelan officer and mercenary Rafael de Nogales, who visited the region in June 1915, Reshid had recently received a three-worded telegram from Talat Pasha to "Burn-Destroy-Kill," an order cited as official government approval of his persecution of the Christian population. Nesimi Bey and Sabit Bey, the governors of the districts of Lice and Sabit, respectively, are both suspected to have been assassinated under the express orders of Reshid for their opposition to the killings.

Anywhere between 144,000 and 157,000 Armenians, Assyrians, and other Christians, or 87 to 95% of the province's Christian population, were killed or deported during Reshid's tenure as governor of Diyarbekir.

Bessie Smith, wife of Floyd Smith, prior to her departure from the United States

During these events, Smith received many patients from throughout the province of Diyarbakir who suffered from deportations, torture, and massacre. He compiled a list of all the patients he treated and provided details concerning each patient. In one such instance, on 21 May 1915, Smith received a group of twenty patients who escaped the massacres of Karabash, a village near Diyarbakir. The village had a population of about seven hundred people, and consisted of a mixed population of Armenians and Assyrians.

Despite the fact that Turkish soldiers were guarding the village to prevent escapes, about twenty people managed to flee to Diyarbakir for safety and treatment. Smith reported that these patients suffered from bullet wounds, severed wrists, attempted decapitations, and sword and knife cuts.

Smith recounted that one of the more common torture techniques was the bastinado, which involves the beating the soles of a person's bare feet. One such patient, considered a "prominent Armenian", underwent seven hundred lashes to the soles of his feet. The man received heavy swelling around his feet and his skin, which had already contained numerous blisters, was visibly broken. Smith also treated an Armenian woman who was beaten in prison and had several bruises on her legs and arms.

In late May 1915, Smith had sent a telegraph to Henry H. Riggs, a Christian missionary stationed in Kharpert. The telegraph requested help from him, since Smith and his wife were the only missionaries left in Diyarbakir. Riggs, who overheard of the massacres in Diyarbakir, immediately went to Diyarbakir and was greeted by Smith. Riggs noted that he was particularly relieved when he saw that Dr. Smith wasn't in immediate danger, since most of the massacres happened outside of Diyarbakir.

Riggs visited Smith's treatment center, which in reality was his own home. In his report to the ABCFM, Smith remarked that Henry H. Riggs was also a witness to the condition of his patients. In his memoirs, Riggs does relate his encounters with Smith's patients. Riggs also noted that Smith refused to leave his post as a doctor since his patients needed him. It was then decided that Dr. Smith's wife and their child Arthur should return with Riggs to Kharpert while Smith remained in Diyarbakir.

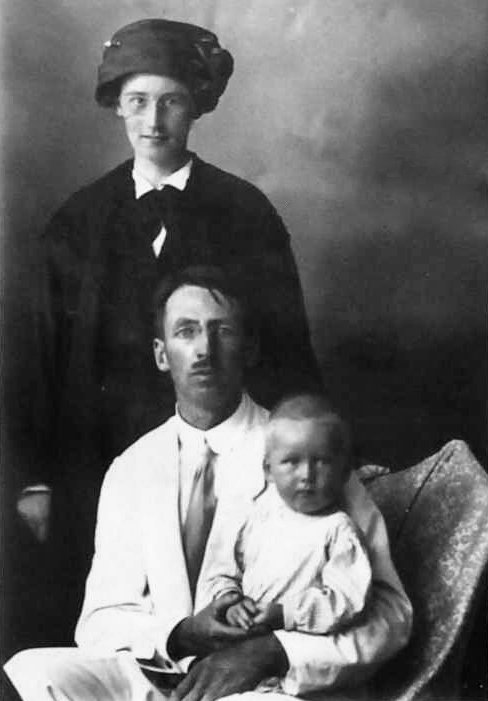
Emergency passport photograph dated 16 August 1915 of the Smith family following their expulsion from Ottoman Empire

Bessie Smith and Arthur left with Riggs to Kharpert on 3 June and arrived two days later. On their way there, Bessie Smith's bag was searched by Turkish authorities and a code that was to be used in communication with her husband was confiscated. This involved use of innocent terms to describe such things as "massacre", "tortures" and "imprisonments".

Rumors had circulated claiming that the Armenians were planning to conduct an insurrection against the local government and that Floyd Smith was one of their agents. Smith believed that an Armenian close to him was forced to make such a claim in order to escape torture. Dr. Floyd Smith was subsequently expelled from Diyarbakir as a result of an official order from the governor. After his expulsion, the government confiscated the property of the ABCFM. Smith was then transferred to Urfa where he was imprisoned; his release was arranged by Jesse B. Jackson, the United States consul of Aleppo. He only able to meet with his wife and children outside of the country.

After a special passport was granted to them in August 1915, Floyd Smith along with his family settled in Beirut before being transferred to Greece.

== Work in the Philippines ==
Floyd Smith volunteered to work for the Red Cross and briefly cared for Russian and Turkish soldiers in 1916. He was then sent to the Philippines in 1918 where he settled in Cagayan de Oro. In 1922, Smith founded a hospital there that contained fifty beds. In late 1924, Bessie Smith died while giving birth to their fifth child. He remarried in 1925, to fellow American missionary Anna Isabel Fox (1890–1974).

He officially served with the Red Cross until 1927, but continued to run his own private medical practice. He then worked for the Insular lumber Company as an industrial doctor and worked around the country.

== World War II ==
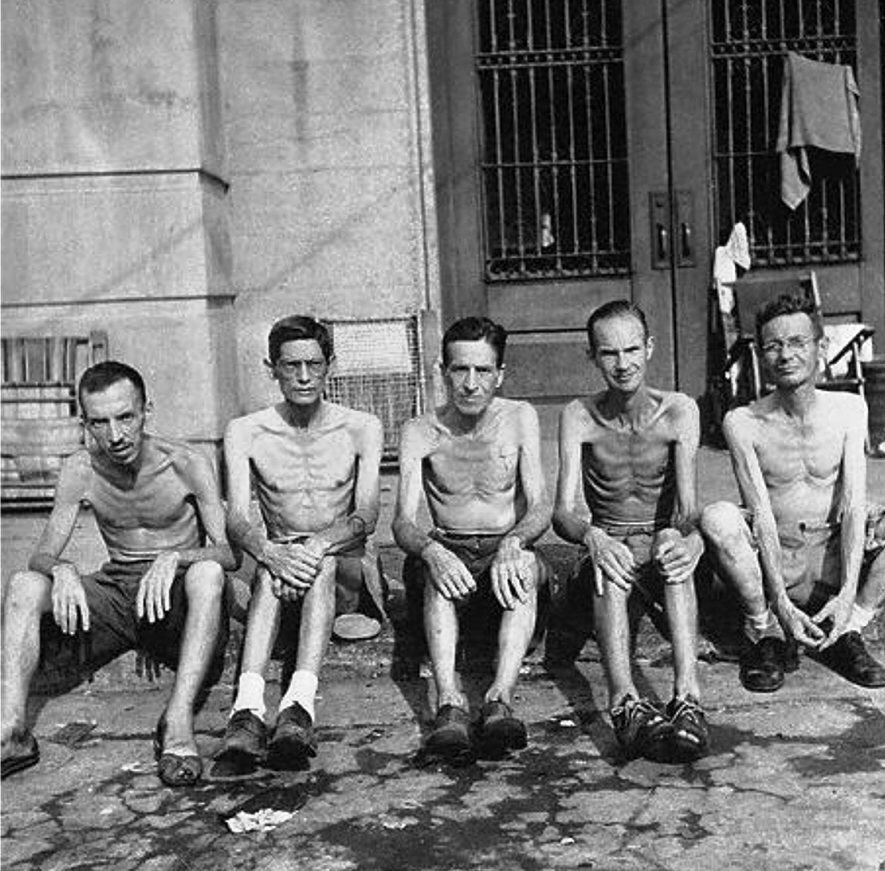
Dr. Floyd Smith treated many male internees who, from malnourishment, lost an average of 53 pounds during the 37 months of their internment at Santo Tomas.

During the Philippines campaign (1941–1942), when Japanese forces invaded the Philippines, Smith fled to Negros island where he and his Filipino friends were captured and taken in as a prisoner of war. For three years, Smith was then interned in various internment camps until he was ultimately relocated to Santo Tomas Internment Camp. The camp housed more than 4,000 internees from January 1942 until February 1945. At Santo Tomas, he continued to treat various prisoners and saved the lives of dozens of internees, many of which were starved.

In January 1945, a doctor reported that the average loss of weight among male internees had been 53 pounds (24 kg) during the three years at Santo Tomas, 32.5 percent of average body weight (Forty percent loss of normal body weight will usually result in death). A month later, however, American forces liberated the camp in February 1945, but it was not until September that Santo Tomas finally closed and the last internees boarded a ship for the US or sought out places to live in Manila, almost completely destroyed in the Battle of Manila.

== Later life ==
After World War II, Smith briefly continued his medical practices in the Philippines. Eventually however, he settled in the United States in the late 1950s. He died in Felton, California on August 6, 1961, at the age of seventy-five and is buried at the Felton cemetery.

== See also ==
- Witnesses and testimonies of the Armenian genocide

== Bibliography ==
- Üngör, Uğur (2011), The Making of Modern Turkey: Nation and State in Eastern Anatolia, 1913-1950, Oxford: Oxford University Press, ISBN 978-0-19-960360-2.
- De Nogales, Rafael (1926), Four Years Beneath the Crescent, New York, London: C. Scribner's Sons.
- Kieser, Hans-Lukas (2011), "From 'Patriotism' to Mass Murder: Dr. Mehmed Reşid (1873–1919)", in Ronald Grigor Suny and Fatma Müge Göçek (ed.), A Question of Genocide: Armenians and Turks at the End of the Ottoman Empire, Oxford: Oxford University Press.
