= Pope Benedict XVI and Islam =

During his papal tenure, Pope Benedict XVI focused on building on the outreach of his predecessors towards Islam. One of the important milestones in the Pope's efforts included a religious and peaceful initiative called A Common Word. This was provoked by a 2006 lecture he delivered at a university in Regensburg, Germany, which prompted Muslim leaders to gather and make overtures to their Christian and Jewish counterparts. Later on, Pope Benedict pursued key initiatives that helped foster Christian and Muslim dialogue. These were founded on the Pope's belief that Christians and Muslims have shared religious experience and that Christianity and Islam are both theologically founded in "God's irruptive call ... heard in the midst of man's ordinary daily existence."

== Condemnation of the Jyllands-Posten Muhammad cartoons controversy ==
Pope Benedict XVI strongly condemned the Mohammed cartoons, first published by a Danish newspaper and later in other European papers, saying "In the international context we are living at present, the Catholic Church continues convinced that, to foster peace and understanding between peoples and men, it is necessary and urgent that religions and their symbols be respected." He also added that this implies that "believers [of various religions] not be the object of provocations that wound their lives and religious sentiments." Pope Benedict XVI noted that "for believers, as for all people of good will, the only path that can lead to peace and fraternity is respect for the convictions and religious practices of others."

== Immigration ==
Pope Benedict XVI called for Christians as "to open their arms and hearts" to Muslim immigrants and "to dialogue" with them on religious issues. The Pope told participants that the Catholic Church is "increasingly aware" that "interreligious dialogue is a part of its commitment to the service of humanity in the modern world." In fact, this "conviction" has become "the daily bread" of those who work with migrants, refugees and itinerant peoples, he said. Pope Benedict described this dialogue between Christians and Muslims as "important and delicate". Many communities have experienced this, he said, as they worked "to build relations of mutual knowledge and respect with (Muslim) immigrants, which are extremely useful in overcoming prejudices and closed minds". For this reason, he added, Christians "are called to open their arms and hearts to everyone, whatever their country of origin, leaving the task of formulating appropriate laws for the promotion of healthy existence to the authorities responsible for public life".

On September 11, 2006, the leaders of Muslim communities in Italy endorsed statements by Pope Benedict XVI who warned that Africa and Asia feel threatened by the West's materialism and secularism. "We agree with the Pope," said Roberto Piccardo, the spokesman of Italy's largest Muslim group UCOII. "It is true that Muslims are puzzled by a West which is hostage to a materialistic system." Mario Scialoja, the former president of the World Muslim League, also expressed support for the pope's words, saying that the "West's exclusion of God leads to the wrong life models." On October 21 the Vatican for the first time released a document in Arabic, a speech of the Vatican UNESCO representative which addresses scientific and ethical issues. The next day the Pope sent his "cordial greetings" to Muslims as they celebrated the ending of the holy month of Ramadan. "I am happy to send cordial greetings to Muslims around the world who are these days celebrating the end of the Ramadan fasting month", said the Pope at the Vatican."I send them all my wishes for serenity and peace", he added.

The October 2006 edition of La Civiltà Cattolica – the authoritative magazine of the Rome Jesuits printed with the supervision and authorization of the Vatican authorities – opened with an editorial on Islam that furnished a description of fundamentalist and terrorist Islam, behind which “there are great and powerful Islamic states”: an Islam aiming at the conquest of the world and fostered by violence “for the cause of Allah". But it does this without even the slightest note of criticism of this nexus of violence and faith. And it is as if this nexus were an inescapable reality, against which the West and the Church should do little or nothing: little at the practical level – it’s enough to look over the scant measures against terrorism that are recommended – and nothing at the theoretical level. For its part, the editorial seems to say that "Islam is the way it is and must be accepted as such."

On November 10, 2006, Pope Benedict urged his fellow German Catholics to discuss their faith in Jesus Christ openly with the Muslims living there. The Pontiff said the Roman Catholic Church viewed Muslims "with respect and good will. They mostly hold on to their religious convictions and rites with great seriousness and have a right to see our humble and strong witness for Jesus Christ", he said after noting that modern German society had been largely secularized. "To do this convincingly, we need to make serious efforts. So wherever there are many Muslims, there should be Catholics with sufficient knowledge of languages and Church history to enable them to talk with Muslims." The same month the Pope received in audience an Algerian Muslim philosopher known for his commitment to battling religious hatred. "I was impressed by his welcome and attention, face to face," Mustapha Chérif, an expert on Islam at the University of Algiers, told the Zenit News Service. The Pope said dialogue among Christians, Muslims and Jews was vital and urged Christians in the Middle East not to abandon the region. "Inter-religious and inter-cultural dialogue is not just an option, but a vital necessity for our times", he told members of a foundation on inter-religious dialogue. Christians needed to find "the ties that unite" them with the world's other two great monotheistic religions.

Cardinal Secretary of State Tarcisio Bertone said in an interview in an Italian newspaper that the Pontifical Council for Inter-Religious Dialogue, which specializes in relations with Muslims, would be made a separate office and no longer merged with the Vatican's cultural office.

== Concerning the war in Iraq ==
The head of the Vatican's Pontifical Council for Interfaith Dialogue said on March 26, 2006 that the war in Iraq should not be viewed as a "crusade" launched by Christian countries against Muslims, and that "Western" was not synonymous to "Christian". "Pope Benedict XVI, like his predecessor John Paul II, never ceases to say this and show it by his acts, such as opposition to armed intervention in Iraq." He said that the church is not "western", but "catholic".

Pope Benedict XVI condemned pre-emptive war. It was the Pope's view that the invasion of Iraq "has no moral justification". As a cardinal, Benedict was critical about President George W. Bush's choice of sending an army into the heart of Islam to impose democracy. "The damage would be greater than the values one hopes to save", he concluded. He also said that "The concept of preventive war does not appear in The Catechism of the Catholic Church."

The Vatican condemned the execution of Saddam Hussein as a "tragic" event and warned that it risked fomenting a spirit of vendetta and sowing fresh violence in Iraq. "A capital punishment is always tragic news, a reason for sadness, even if it deals with a person who was guilty of grave crimes," said Vatican spokesman Father Federico Lombardi. "The position of the Church (against capital punishment) has been restated often", he said. "The killing of the guilty party is not the way to reconstruct justice and reconcile society. On the contrary, there is a risk that it will feed a spirit of vendetta and sow new violence", he said.

At Easter, Pope Benedict XVI lamented the continual slaughter in Iraq and unrest in Afghanistan as he denounced violence in the name of religion. "Afghanistan is marked by growing unrest and instability, Benedict said. "In the Middle East, besides some signs of hope in the dialogue between Israel and the Palestinian Authority, unfortunately, nothing positive comes from Iraq, torn apart by continual slaughter as the civil population flees."

== Concerning Iran ==
Pope Benedict XVI, in his first Easter message on April 16, 2006, called for a peaceful solution in the nuclear standoff with Iran, saying, "Concerning the international crises linked to nuclear power, may an honorable solution be found for all parties through serious and honest negotiations." Tony Blair was granted a private audience with the Pope in June at the Vatican at the end of a week-long trip to Italy. The Pope told the Prime Minister to pursue diplomatic solutions to problems with states in the Middle East, including Iran. A Vatican spokesman said: "The Pope did stress that diplomacy and not conflict was the best way forward". The two leaders also discussed how "moderate voices" from the world's main religions need to work together to tackle extremism and reduce the risk of terrorism.

German Chancellor Angela Merkel discussed the Middle East and Iran with Pope Benedict in a private audience in August 2006. She came out of her hour-long audience saying it was a “very impressive” experience. “We had a very intense exchange on world politics, especially on the Middle East, but also on how the international community should deal with Iran". Pope Benedict has been contacted by Iran’s President Mahmoud Ahmadinejad as Tehran faces international isolation for its nuclear program.

The following month Iranian President Mahmoud Ahmadinejad expressed respect for Pope Benedict XVI and said the pontiff had "modified" his remarks that offended Muslims worldwide."We respect the Pope and all those interested in peace and justice", Ahmadinejad told a news conference before departing for Venezuela. "I understand that he has modified the remarks he made."

The Pope met Iran's Foreign Minister Manouchehr Mottaki in December and called for dialogue to overcome conflicts, in an apparent reference to Tehran's standoff with the West over its atomic programme. The Vatican said in a statement that the Pope exchanged "warm wishes" with Mottaki."The problems of people are always resolved through dialogue, mutual comprehension and in peace," the Vatican said. Mottaki, during a private audience with the leader of the world's 1,000 million Roman Catholics, delivered a letter to the Pope from Ahmadinejad. "The message is completely non-political", Ehsan Jahandideh, a presidential office spokesman was quoted as saying by Iran's ISNA students news agency."The president has emphasised in the message that cooperation of divine religions will help resolving problems of mankind", it said.

On May 4, 2007, former Iranian president Mohammad Khatami met Pope Benedict and said the wounds between Christians and Muslims were still "very deep", including those caused by a controversial papal speech last September. Khatami became one of the most prominent Muslim clerics to visit the Vatican since the Pope's controversial Regensburg speech which angered Muslims by appearing to link Islam and violence.The Vatican said Khatami and the Pope met for about 30 minutes and spoke through interpreters about the "dialogue among cultures" to overcome current tensions and promote peace. In talks that a spokesman called cordial, they also discussed the problems of minority Christians in Iran and the Middle East and encouraged peace efforts such as the conference on Iraq's future taking place in Sharm El-Sheikh, Egypt. In December Iran's President Mahmoud Ahmadinejad sent a Christmas message to the Pope saying that he hoped the Christian feast would "bring peace and tranquility, founded upon justice and spirituality, to the international community." He told the Pontiff that he hoped the new year 2008 would bring "the elimination of oppression, of violence, and of discrimination."

== Concerning the Middle East conflict ==
The Pope called for the establishment of a Palestinian state. He said: "May the international community, which re-affirms Israel's just right to exist in peace, assist the Palestinian people to overcome the precarious conditions in which they live and to build their future, moving towards the constitution of a state that is truly their own".

The Pope received the first Bethlehem Passport from Palestinian President Mahmoud Abbas at the Vatican on December 3, 2005. The citation reads:

In that the bearer of this passport is a citizen of Bethlehem; that they recognise this ancient city provides a light to the world, and to all people who uphold the values of a just and open society; that they will remain a true friend to Bethlehem through its imprisonment, and that they will strive to keep the ideals of Bethlehem alive as long as the wall stands; we ask you to respect the bearer of the passport and to let them pass freely.

The passport is an initiative of the Open Bethlehem foundation, which was founded in November 2005 with the support of Bethlehem civil institutions and world figures including former USA President Jimmy Carter and Archbishop Desmond Tutu.

On June 14, 2006, Pope Benedict XVI urged Israelis and Palestinians in his weekly general audience to return to negotiation after the "increasingly blind" tit-for-tat violence. The Vatican said in a statement that the pope felt close to the innocent victims of such violence and that the Holy Land had become "hostage to those who delude themselves they can solve the ever more dramatic problems of the region by force or unilateral action". The Vatican appealed to both sides "to show due respect for human life, especially that of unarmed civilians and children". In its statement, the Vatican urged the resumption "with courage of the path of negotiations, the only one that can lead to the just and lasting peace we all aspire to." It also urged the international community to "rapidly activate" funds for humanitarian aid to Palestinians. Later that month the Pope called for 'serene and peaceful co-existence' in the Middle East. Referring to Eastern Catholic Churches in the Holy Land, the Pope said

"the serious difficulties it is going through because of profound insecurity, lack of work, innumerable restrictions and consequent growing poverty, are a cause of pain for us all... I invite pastors, faithful, and everyone in positions of responsibility in the civil community, to favour mutual respect between cultures and religions, and to create as soon as possible the conditions for serene and peaceful coexistence throughout the Middle East."

On July 14, 2006, The Vatican condemned Israel's strikes on Lebanon, saying they were "an attack" on a sovereign nation. Cardinal Secretary of State Angelo Sodano said Pope Benedict and his aides were very worried that the developments in the Middle East risked degenerating into "a conflict with international repercussions." "In particular, the Holy See deplores right now the attack on Lebanon, a free and sovereign nation, and assures its closeness to these people who already have suffered so much to defend their independence", he told Vatican Radio.

Two days later the Pope prayed that God grant “the fundamental gift of harmony, bringing political leaders back on the path of reason and opening new possibilities for dialogue and understanding.” “In these days, the news from the Holy Land are all cause for new, grave worry, in particular, the widening of belligerent actions even in Lebanon, and for the numerous victims among the civilian population. At the origin of these merciless conflicts are, unfortunately, objective situations of violation of rights and of justice. But neither terrorist acts nor retaliation, above all when there are tragic consequences for the civilian population, can be justified, going down such roads – bitter experience has shown – does not bring positive results." Later that month, Pope Benedict stated that he did not plan to intervene diplomatically in the Middle East fighting, but called on people of all religions to join Sunday's worldwide day of prayers for peace. "I think it is best to leave that to the diplomats, because we don't enter politics. But we do everything for peace. Our goal is simply peace, and we will do everything to help attain peace," Benedict told reporters as he returned from an hour-long hike in the Italian Alps. The Pope has set aside Sunday as a worldwide day of prayers for peace, hoping the prayers will bring a halt to the fighting. Benedict invited everyone to pray, "especially Muslims and Jews." Benedict said he had heard from Catholic communities in Lebanon and Israel, "...especially from Lebanon, who implored us, as they have implored the Italian government, to help. We will help with our prayers and with the people we have in ... in Lebanon".

Pope Benedict XVI appealed on July 30, 2006 for an immediate cease-fire in the Middle East, hours after the deadliest attack in nearly three weeks of fighting between Israel and Hezbollah. "In the name of God, I appeal to all those responsible for this spiral of violence, so that they immediately put down their arms on all sides. Immediately. I appeal to governing leaders and to international institutions not to spare any effort to obtain this necessary cessation of hostilities. In this moment I cannot help but think of the situation, ever more grave and more tragic, that the Middle East is going through: hundreds of dead, so many wounded, a huge number of the homeless and refugees, houses, cities and infrastructure destroyed. These facts demonstrate clearly that you cannot re-establish justice, create a new order and build authentic peace when you resort to instruments of violence".

With the war in Lebanon, the Vatican's Middle East policies under Pope Benedict XVI came into clearer focus. Pope Benedict's pleas to stop the carnage, particularly after an Israeli air raid killed many civilians in Qana, echoed the dramatic appeals of Pope John Paul during times of Mideast conflict. In private talks, Vatican officials asked that the U.S. government use its influence with Israel to bring an immediate halt to hostilities. To the Israelis, the Vatican made it clear that it views its military offensive in Lebanon as a disproportionate use of force. On August 7, 2006, Pope Benedict XVI renewed his appeal for peace in the Middle East and said he was deeply disappointed that calls for an immediate cease-fire in Lebanon had been ignored. "Faced with the bitter fact that up to now the calls for an immediate cease-fire in that martyred region have been disregarded, I feel impelled to renew my pressing appeal to that effect, asking everyone to offer their real contribution to the construction of a just and lasting peace." Pope Benedict donated two ambulances and emergency medical supplies to Caritas Lebanon.

"War is the worst solution for everyone," he has said. "It brings nothing of good for anyone, not even for the apparent victors. We know this well in Europe, after the two world wars. What everyone needs is peace. There are moral forces ready to help people understand that the only solution is that we must live together". He said the Vatican's actions and his own appeals were designed to mobilize all the potential forces of peace.

Pope Benedict sent a special envoy to Lebanon to lead prayers for peace. The Pope has asked Roger Etchegaray, a French Cardinal who was often the late Pope John Paul's special envoy to trouble spots, "to transmit to the suffering population ... his spiritual proximity and real solidarity". While the French cardinal's mission is "essentially religious" to try to celebrate Mass on Sunday with the patriarch of Lebanon's Maronite church, the Vatican says he may also meet President Émile Lahoud and Prime Minister Fouad Siniora. Etchegaray, 83-year-old president of the Pontifical Council for Justice and Peace, was sent by Pope John Paul to Iraq in early 2003 to meet Saddam Hussein and try to avert war.

The Pope encouraged Syria to use its influence to help resolve Middle East conflicts and counter terrorism. He told Syria's ambassador that he was heartened by the diplomat's assurances that Damascus is committed to "counter this growing threat to peace and stability. The world looks especially to countries with significant influence in the Middle East in the hopeful expectation of signs of progress toward the resolution of these long-standing conflicts", the Pope said. A U.N. General Assembly resolution in September demanded that Israel withdraw from the Golan Heights, which it annexed from Syria in 1967. "You have spoken of your government's concern over the annexation of the Golan Heights by Israel in 1967," Benedict said, referring to a speech that was just delivered by the ambassador, Makram Obeid, as the envoy presented his credentials". Like many impartial observers, the Holy See believes that solutions are possible within the framework of international law through the implementation of the relevant United Nations resolutions," the pontiff said.

The Pope met Palestinian Authority president Mahmoud Abbas in April 2007 for talks that focused on the situation in the Middle East, the Vatican said in a statement. "In particular an appreciation was expressed for the relaunch, also thanks to the efforts of the international community, of the peace process between Israelis and Palestinians," the statement said. Benedict also discussed the "difficulty faced by Catholics" in the Palestinian territories and "the value of their contribution to that society," it added.

== Concerning the Islam controversy ==
On September 12, 2006, while lecturing on "Faith, Reason and the University" at the University of Regensburg, where he was formerly a professor, Pope Benedict quoted the opinion of Byzantine Emperor Manuel II Palaiologos, "Show me just what Muhammad brought that was new and there you will find things only evil and inhuman, such as his command to spread by the sword the faith he preached". In the original German, Benedict XVI described this critical opinion of Manuel II as "addressed... with a startling brusqueness" ("in erstaunlich schroffer, uns überraschend schroffer Form" ). The Pope later explained that the remark was meant to compare early Muslim teaching on religious freedom with the later teaching on jihad, and was cited as part of a larger theological assertion, that "reason and faith go hand in hand, and that the concept of a holy war is always unreasonable, and against the nature of God, Muslim or Christian"

The quotation from this medieval text drew criticism from a number of individual governmental representatives and Muslim religious leaders, including Yusuf Al-Qaradawi, Hamza Yusuf, and Ali Bardakoğlu, the Director of Religious Affairs of Turkey, as well as the governments of Somalia and Pakistan and India's major political parties. Some critics claimed the Pope made a number of historical errors. The main one being that, although the Pope had said that verse 2:256 stating "There is no compulsion in religion..." was an early verse when Mohamed was powerless in Mecca, this verse was one of the latest verses to be added to the Quran in Medina at a time when the Muslim state was powerful thereby taking a lot of weight out of the Pope's statement. Others have noted a heavy reliance on analogia entis rather than analogia fidei, and to consider "faith as the common ground" in the approach to Islam.

The Director of the Vatican press office, Federico Lombardi, explained the Pope's statement: "It was certainly not the intention of the Holy Father to undertake a comprehensive study of the jihad and of Muslim ideas on the subject, still less to offend the sensibilities of Muslim faithful. Quite the contrary, what emerges clearly from the Holy Father’s discourses is a warning, addressed to Western culture, to avoid 'the contempt for God and the cynicism that considers mockery of the sacred to be an exercise of freedom'".

There were public protests, including violent ones in the West Bank where two churches were firebombed, over his comments in various countries in the subsequent days. There has been a death threat on the Pope since the lecture from a group linked to Al Qaeda. Pope Benedict expressed his regret for any offense his words had given: "The Holy Father is very sorry that some passages of his speech may have sounded offensive to the sensibilities of Muslim believers," said Cardinal Secretary of State Tarcisio Bertone in a statement. According to CNN, the Vatican comments fell short of a literal apology.

On September 17, 2006, from the balcony at his residence at Castel Gandolfo outside Rome, Pope Benedict publicly expressed that he was 'deeply sorry for the reactions in some countries' and stressed that the words which 'were considered offensive' were not his own, but were quoted from a medieval text, and that his speech was intended to act as an invitation to mutually respectful dialogue with Muslims, rather than an attempt to cause offense. A few days later the Pope held a meeting at his summer residence in Castel Gandolfo with approximately 20 Muslim diplomats. At this meeting the Pope Benedict expressed "total and profound respect for all Muslims". Among the ambassadors invited included Iraq, Iran, Turkey, Morocco, and many other nations and Islamic Groups.

The following month Pope Benedict XVI took another step to placate anger in the Islamic world over his remarks on holy war, making additions to his original text affirming that a quotation from a 14th-century Byzantine emperor was not his personal opinion. The original said the emperor's remark was made "somewhat brusquely". In the new version, it says it was made with "a brusqueness that we find unacceptable." Benedict added in a footnote: "In the Muslim world, this quotation has unfortunately been taken as an expression of my personal position, thus arousing understandable indignation. I hope that the reader of my text can see immediately that this sentence does not express my personal view of the Quran, for which I have the respect due to the holy book of a great religion." He said he cited the text as part of an examination of the "relationship between faith and reason".

An open letter was sent to Pope Benedict XVI by 38 Muslim authorities (later extended to 100) express an acceptance for his apology over his remarks on Islam. The signatories to the letter declare that they accept the Pope's "personal expression of sorrow and assurance that the controversial quote did not reflect his personal opinion". Some of the clerics who signed the letter were Shaikh Habib Ali of the Tabah Institute in Abu Dhabi and Prince Ghazi bin Muhammad, the special adviser to Jordan's King Abdullah II. Others who signed the letter include the grand muftis of Egypt, Russia, Bosnia, Croatia, Kosovo and Metohija (Serbia), Turkey, Uzbekistan and Oman, as well as the Iranian Shiite cleric Ayatollah Mohammad Ali Taskhiri, and Professor Seyyed Hossein Nasr of George Washington University, Washington.

== Concerning Turkey ==
Pope Benedict XVI said his forthcoming visit to Turkey in 2006 was a sign of the friendship he held for the Turkish people. “As you all know I am leaving for Turkey on Tuesday,” the Pontiff said in his weekly Angelus prayer in Rome on the preceding Sunday. “Starting right now, I want to send a cordial greeting to the dear Turkish people, rich in history and culture. To these people and their representatives I express feelings of esteem and sincere friendship.” The Pope said he backed Turkey's bid to join the European Union, Prime Minister Recep Tayyip Erdoğan said after meeting the pontiff upon his arrival in Ankara for his first visit to a Muslim country. The Pope told Erdoğan that while the Vatican seeks to stay out of politics it "desires Turkey's membership in the EU".

The Pope had reversed his earlier opposition to Turkey's efforts to join the EU, appearing to back the overwhelmingly Muslim country's hard-fought push towards membership at the start of his visit. The Pope expressed hope that Turkey would join the EU. A papal spokesman later clarified the remarks, saying the Pope had told the Turkish leader the Vatican did not have the power to intervene, but "viewed positively and encouraged" the process of Turkey's entry into the EU "on the basis of common values and principles". Mr Erdoğan said: “The most important message the Pope gave was toward Islam, reiterating his view of Islam as peaceful and affectionate.”

Pope Benedict XVI visited one of Turkey's most famous mosques in what was seen as an attempt to mend relations with the Muslim community. During his tour of the Blue Mosque in Istanbul, accompanied by local art historian Dr. Sedat Bornovalı, the pontiff turned towards Mecca in a gesture of Muslim prayer, together with Prof. Dr. Mustafa Çağrıcı, Mufti of İstanbul. It marked only the second papal visit in history to a Muslim place of worship. Earlier, the Pope visited the nearby Hagia Sophia Museum - a site heavy with Christian and Muslim symbolism - drawing a large crowd of protesters.

The Papal trip to Turkey was widely hailed as a success. The aim was to mend fences there and, as he was greeted on his return by Italian leader Romano Prodi, the pontiff appeared to have succeeded in this. Ilter Turan, a professor of political science in Istanbul, said: “Visiting the Blue Mosque and praying with the Muslims indicated that maybe he had not expressed himself carefully in his earlier conversations with students at Regensburg and certainly his gestures will go a long way to alleviate the initial scar that was left by his remarks”. The Pope also praised Islam as a peaceful faith and expressed support for Turkey's bid to join the EU.

The prayer in Istanbul’s Blue Mosque was “not initially planned but it turned out to be very meaningful”. It was a prayer to the “one Lord of heaven and earth, merciful father of all mankind”. Addressing today’s general audience, this was how Benedict XVI described his silent prayer on 30 November in Istanbul. The Pope “thanked divine Providence for this” and said: “May all believers identify themselves with the one God and bear witness to true brotherhood.” The Pontiff augured that Turkey “will be a bridge of friendship and collaboration between East and West” and he thanked the Turkish people “for the cordiality and sympathy” they showed him throughout his stay, when “he felt loved and understood”.

The Vatican considered Prime Minister Recep Tayyip Erdogan's strong victory in the 2007 general election in Turkey "the best result for Europe and for the Christian churches." In an interview published by Italian daily Corriere della Sera, Cardinal Sergio Sebastiani also invited the European Union to resume talks with Ankara on Turkey's entry to the bloc.

== Somalia ==
Pope Benedict XVI called for negotiations to end fighting in Somalia, Associated Press reported from the Vatican City. In a speech to diplomats recently on global issues, the Pontiff recalled an Italian nun who was slain in Somalia last September, who he said would inspire efforts to end conflict in the Horn of Africa, where an Islamist movement threatening to overthrow the Western-backed dictatorship of Somalia has been ousted. Benedict called on all sides to lay down their arms and negotiate.

== Sudan ==
Pope Benedict XVI, meeting with Sudanese President Omar al-Bashir on 14 September 2007, voiced his "heartfelt hope" for the success of peace talks next month for the war-torn region of Darfur, the Vatican said. "It is the Holy See's heartfelt hope that these negotiations prove successful in order to put an end to the suffering and insecurity of those peoples," the Vatican said in a statement.

== Saudi Arabia ==
Pope Benedict XVI welcomed King Abdullah of Saudi Arabia to the Vatican on November 6, 2007, marking the first time that a Saudi king has officially held talks with the Pope. During their encounter, the two leaders discussed religious freedom, inter-religious and inter-cultural dialogue and the need to resolve the Israeli-Palestinian conflict. The Pope received King Abdullah warmly, grasping both his hands and leading him into his library where they spoke in Italian and Arabic for 30 minutes. The meeting was arranged for at the request of the king who was on a tour of Europe.
