= Saint Paul Church, Adana =

Coordinates: 36°59′15″N 35°19′33″E

Saint Paul Church
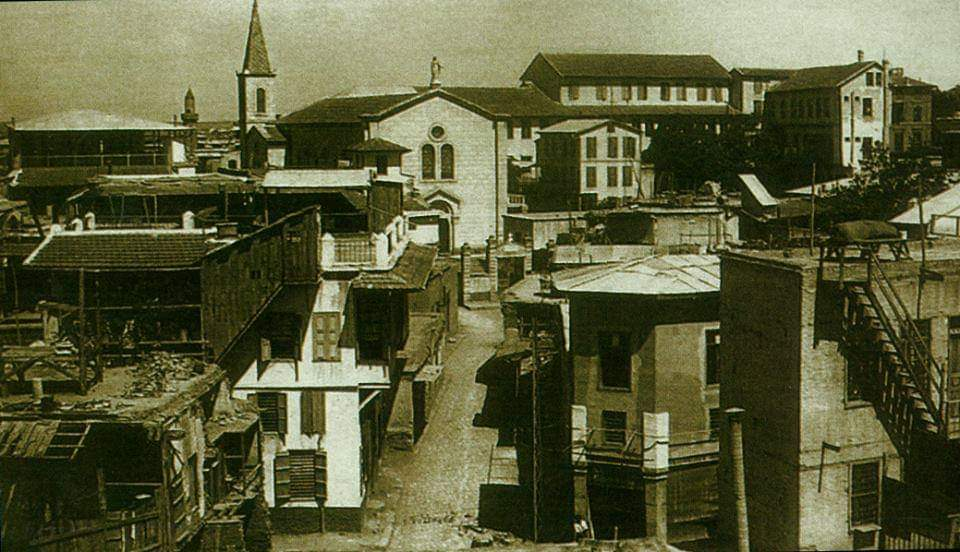
- St.Paul Church in the early 1900s as an Armenian church
- Saint Paul Church
- Location: Seyhan, Adana
- Country: Turkey
- Denomination: Roman Catholic

Architecture
- Style: Jesuit
- Completed: 1870

Saint Paul Church (Turkish: Aziz Pavlus Kilisesi), alternatively known as the Bebekli Kilise, is a Roman Catholic Church in Adana. The church was built by the Jesuit Order in 1870, and served the Armenian and European Catholic communities. After the Armenian genocide and with the foundation of the Republic of Turkey, the church was handed over to the Apostolic Vicariate of Anatolia. St. Paul Church is located close to the 5 Ocak Square, off the Cemal Gürsel Street. The 2.5 meter high bronze statue of Mary resembled a baby to the people walking by and the church became known as the "Church with Baby" (Bebekli Kilise).

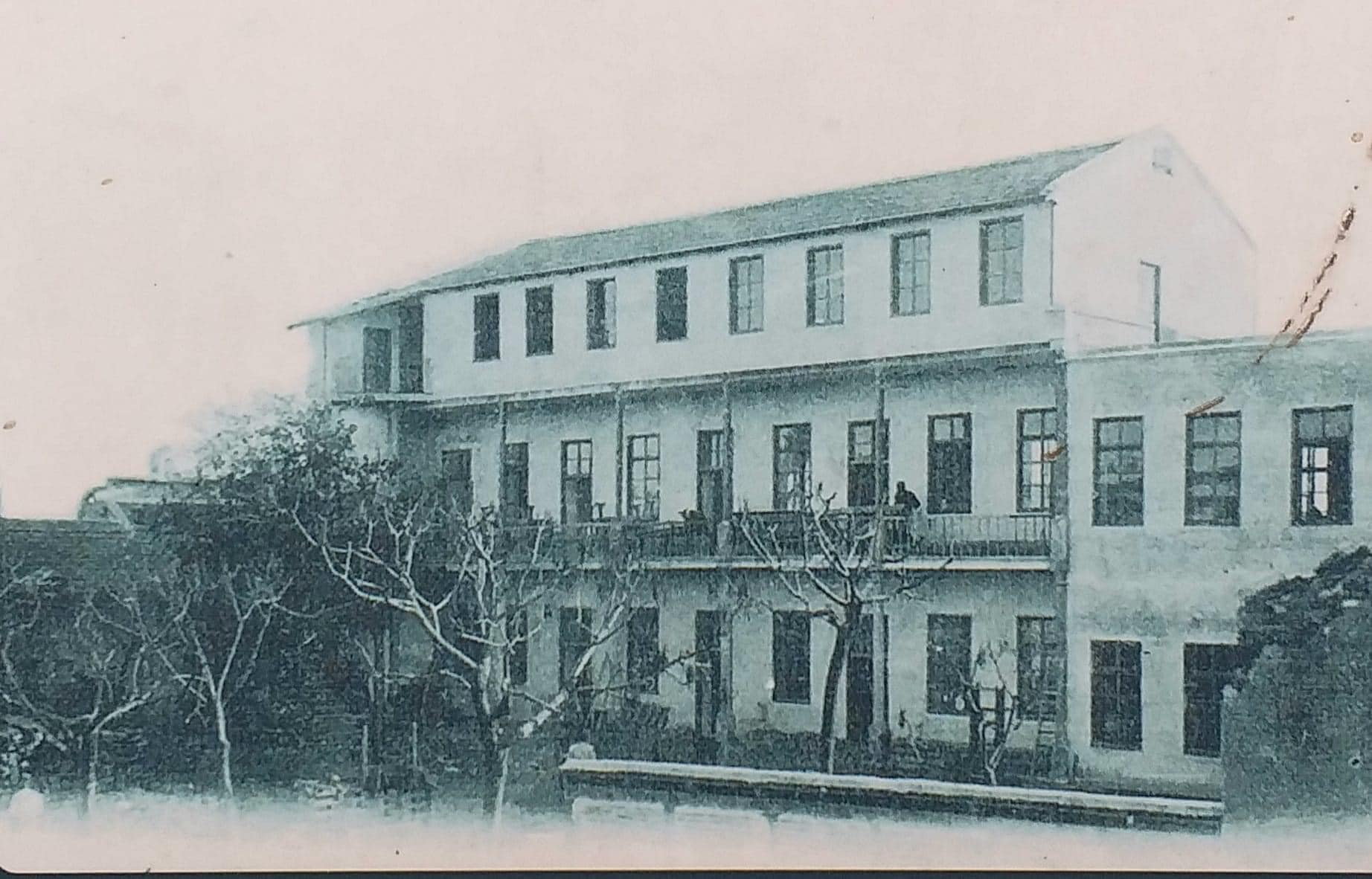
Jesuit School

The building just east of to the church was the Jesuit St.Jeanne d'Arc High School which had opened in 1870s and served until it was burned at the Massacre of 1909 against the Armenian population. The Jesuit church and the school was built by the French Jesuits as a complex, therefore the language of both was French. The school was demolished after the burning and the site is now used as a parking lot. Behind the church and the Jesuit school, a Protestant school for Girls was built by American missionaries. The girls' school was restored and now serves as Tepebağ High School.

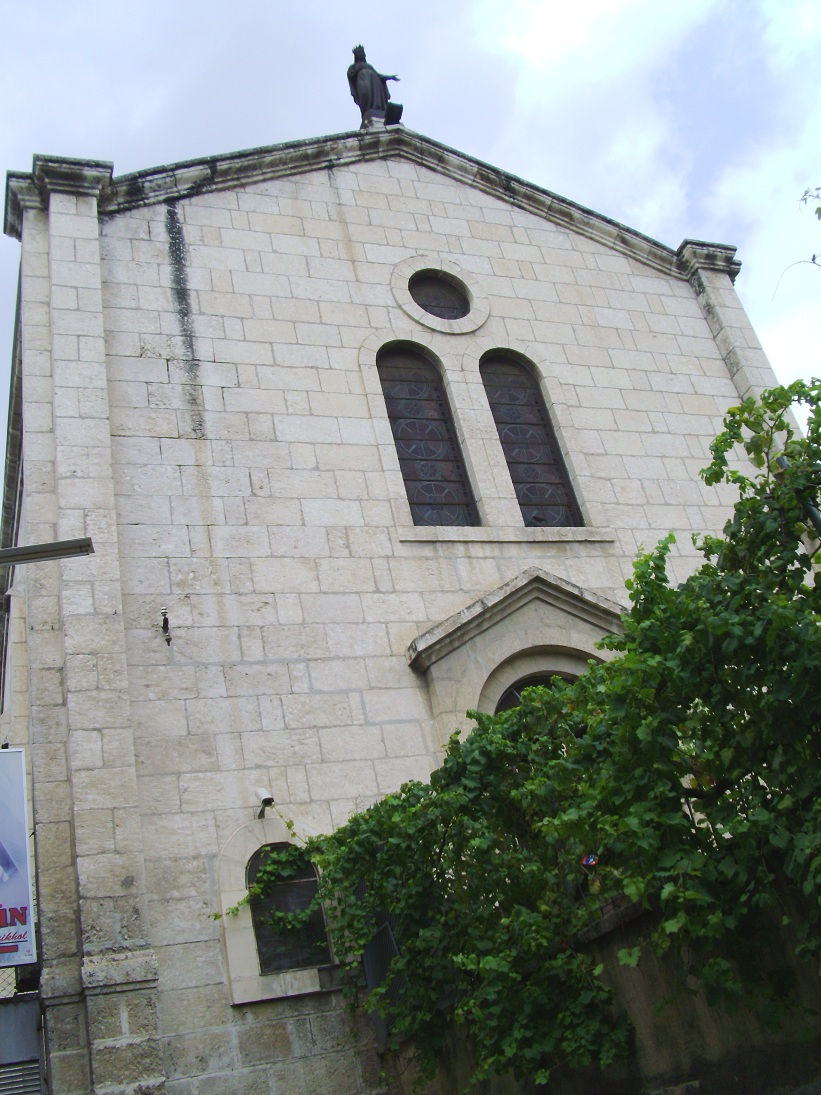
Church front

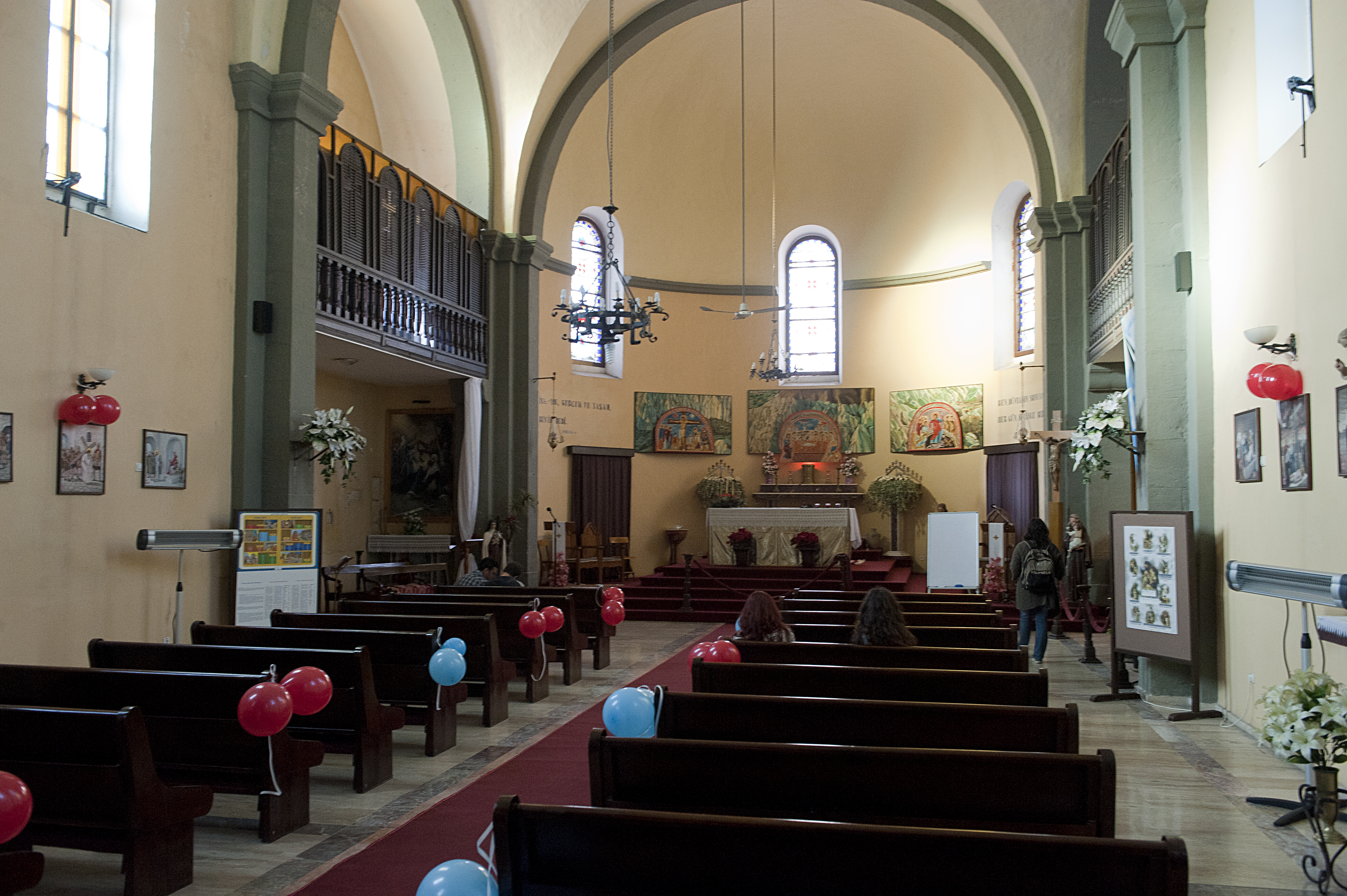
Church Apse and more interior

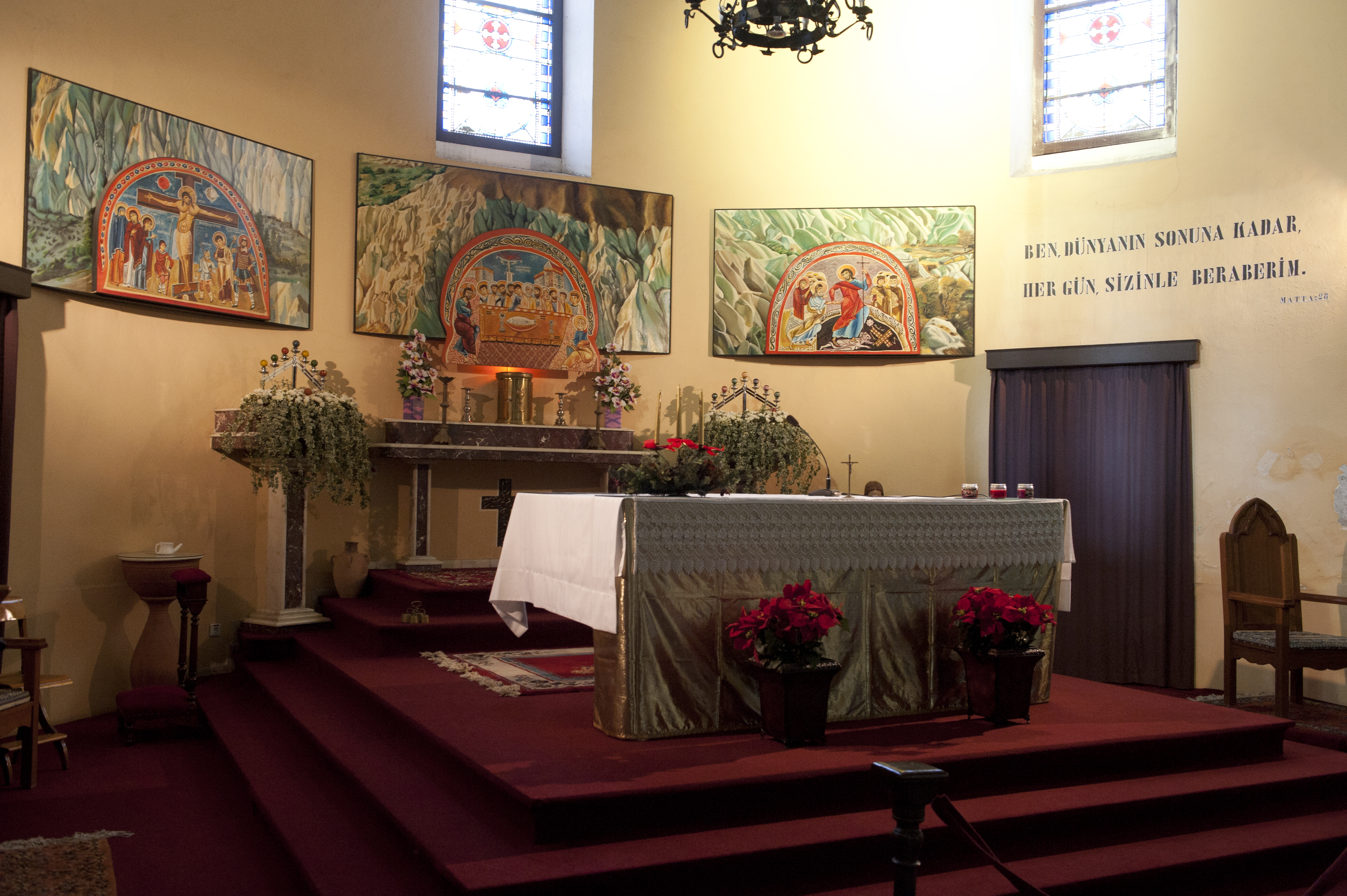
Church Altar

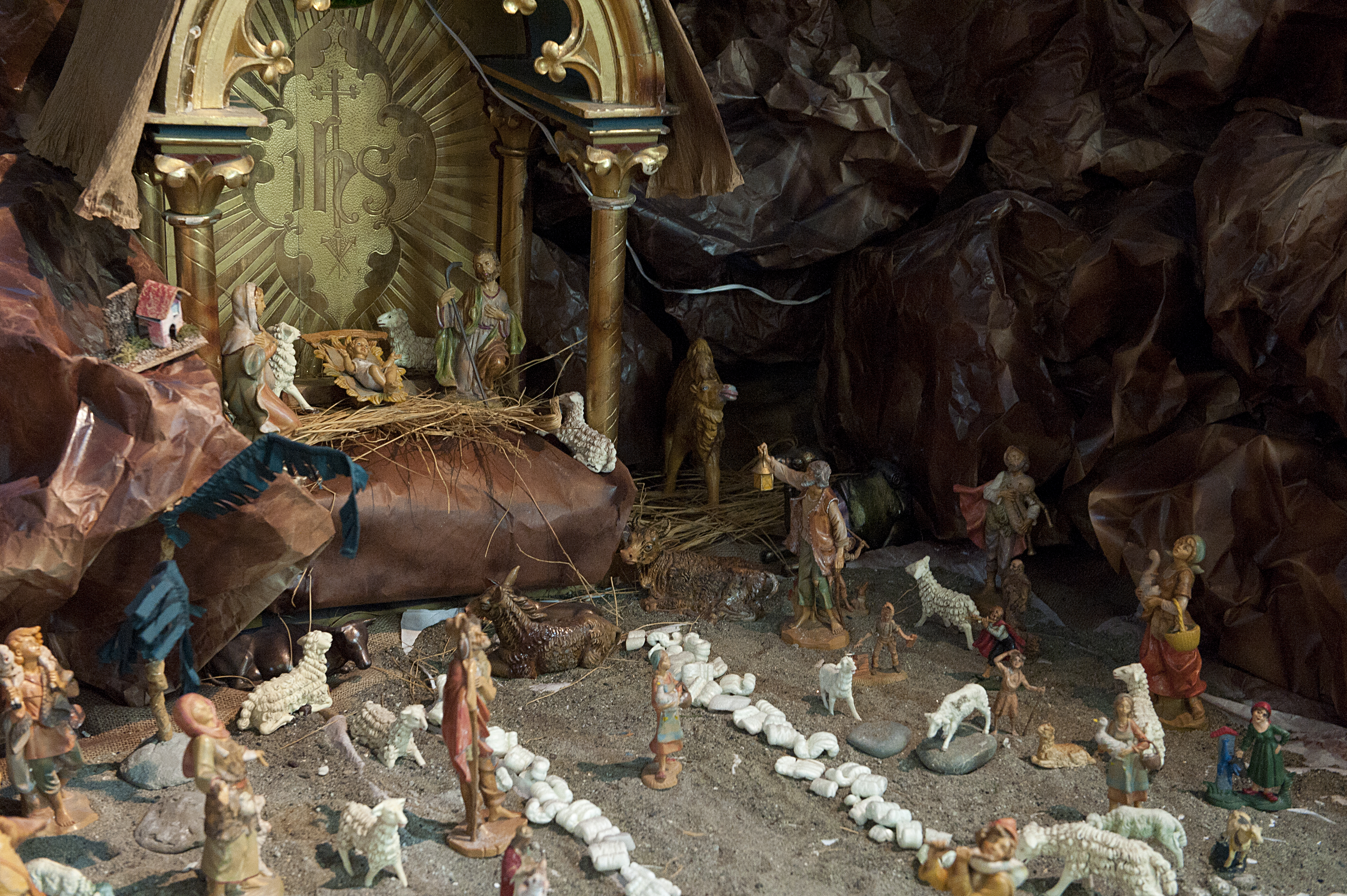
Adana Nativity scene

== See also ==
- Christianity in Turkey
