= Liceo Italiano di Istanbul =

- İtalyan Lisesi, Liceo Italiano di Istanbul, Istituti Medi Italiani, I.M.I.

Location
- Istanbul; Turkey
- Coordinates: 41°01′48″N 28°58′43″E

Information
- Type: Private according to MEB; Public according to MIUE
- Established: 1861
- Principal: Giuseppe Finocchiaro (Principal); Özgür Doğu (Turkish Chief Vice Principal); Nida İntiba (Turkish Vice Principal)
- Colors: Blue, Gold
- Website: www.liceoitaliano.net

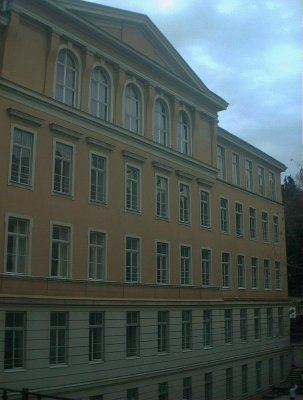
The front facade of the school building

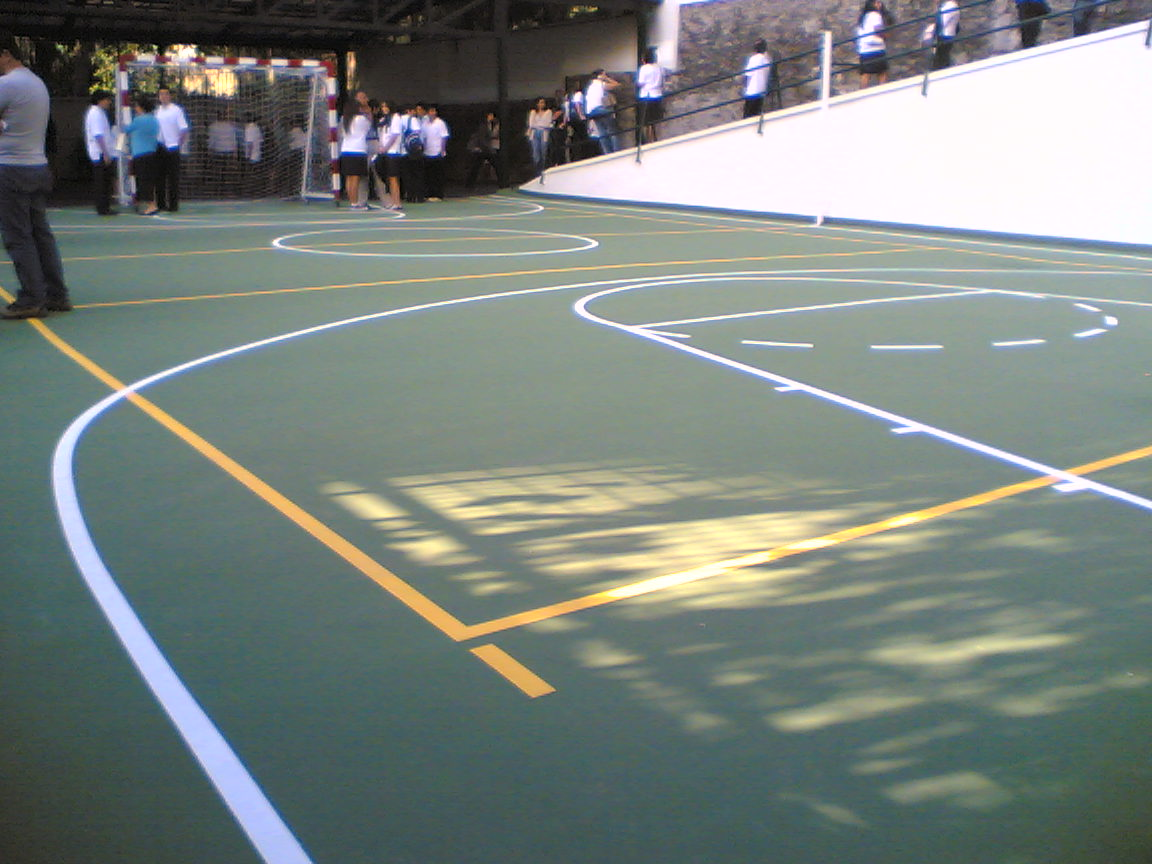
A typical first day of school

The Liceo Italiano Statale Istanbul (Turkish: Özel İtalyan Lisesi) or the Istituti Medi Italiani (I.M.I.), popularly known as Liceo Italiano in Italian and İtalyan Lisesi in Turkish, is under legislation a private school which is situated in Beyoğlu, Istanbul, Turkey. Although considered a private school under Turkish law, the Liceo Italiano receives financial support and teachers from Italy and is owned by the Italian government.

== History ==
It was founded in 1888.

== Notable alumni ==
- Can Yaman, actor
- Ayşecan Tatari, actress
- Çağla Kubat, European slalom windsurf champion, model, Miss Turkey 2002 the first runner-up
- Ergin Ataman, basketball coach
- Giovanni Scognamillo, writer
- Hazal Kaya, actress
- Jaklin Çarkçı, opera singer
- Kudsi Ergüner, ney performer
- Leyla Gencer, opera singer
- Mehmet Günsür, actor
- Nilüfer Yumlu, singer
- Özlem Kaymaz, model, Miss Turkey 1992
- Sedat Bornovalı, art historian

== See also ==
- Palace of Venice, Istanbul
- List of missionary schools in Turkey
- List of high schools in Turkey
- Education in the Ottoman Empire
