= Galileo Galilei High School of Istanbul =

Location
- Turnacıbaşı Sokak No: 20 Beyoğlu - İstanbul; Turkey
- Coordinates: 41.03318178480166°N 28.9802237376823°E

Information
- Former names: İtalyan Kız Ortaokulu Beyoğlu İtalyan Lisesi
- School type: Private Foreign High School
- Established: 1870
- Director: Susanna Bernardi
- Language: Italian; Turkish
- Website: https://www.galileilisesi.k12.tr/

Private Galileo Galilei Italian High School (Italian: Liceo Scientifico Galileo Galilei, Turkish: Özel Galileo Galilei İtalyan Lisesi ) is a private foreign high school (yabancı özel lisesi) in Beyoğlu district of İstanbul, Türkiye. It is a bilingual Turkish-Italian school that uses both Turkish and Italian curriculums.

== History ==
The school was opened in 1870 following the decree of Sultan Abdülaziz by the Catholic Sisters of Charity of the Immaculate Conception of Ivrea. Initially, the school was established to provide education at the kindergarten and primary school levels for children of Italian families living in Turkey, but later it began to admit Turkish students as well.

Originally opened on Kumbaracı Yokuşu, it moved to the current location in 1882. Throughout history, education was intermittently interrupted due to the Italo-Turkish War (1911–12) and World War I (1915-18) between the Ottoman Empire and the Kingdom of Italy. In 1919, the middle school opened, and the school name was changed to "Private Italian Girls' Middle School" (Scuola Media Italiana Femminile, Özel İtalyan Kız Ortaokulu), and a preparatory class was added for students who did not know Italian. The law in 1931 required all Turkish citizens to go to Turkish primary schools, so the primary school began to admit only foreign nationals. Gradually, the school transitioned to co-educations, starting with the kindergarten and primary school classes in 1959.

In 2000, the school's name was changed to "Beyoğlu Italian High School" (Liceo Italiano di Beyoğlu, Beyoğlu İtalyan Lisesi). In 2005, the institution was accredited with an equivalency certificate from high schools in Italy, and was renamed to "Private Galileo Galilei Italian High School.".

== Admissions ==
The school accepts students on the basis of the LGS examination. In 2024, it accepted 72 students, with the lowest LGS score being in the top 3.9%.

== Education ==
The school offers a preparatory year for learning Italian as the language of instruction, and four years of combined Italian Liceo scientifico and MEB curriculums. In the end, the students can choose to take the Italian state examination

== Leadership ==
Unlike many other schools in Turkey, the leadership in the Liceo Scientifico Galileo Galilei is all-female

== See also ==
- List of missionary schools in Turkey
- List of high schools in Turkey
- Education in the Ottoman Empire
