= Jaklin Çarkçı =

Jaklin Çarkçı (Armenian: Ժակլին Չարքչը, born 1958) is a mezzo-soprano of the Istanbul State Opera in Turkey.

== Life ==
Born in Istanbul, Turkey to a family of Armenian descent, Jaklin was introduced to opera at an early age by her father, Jirayr Çarkçı, who was one of the first soloists of the Istanbul State Opera theater. She is a graduate of the Liceo Italiano school in Istanbul.

Jaklin Çarkçı's career began with a 1988 debut as Azuncena in Giuseppe Verdi's Il Trovatore at the Istanbul State Opera. As a result of her success as a soloist, the State Opera Ballet selected her to become a part of its soloist staff. She became well known for her over 150 performances as the title character of the famous opera Carmen. She toured and performed in places such as Belarus, Sofia, and Solothurn. After being awarded the "Prime Ministry Information and Good Manners Scholarship" by the Turkish Ministry of Culture in 1993 and 1994, she went to Italy where she worked with renowned conductors and stage managers such as Robert Wagner, Roberto Benzi, Lucas Caritions, Letizia Cavani, Giancarlo del Monaco. She has also worked with sopranos such as Leyla Gencer and was taught by Carlo Bergonzi and Giacomo Aragall. In 2005 in Foggia, Italy, she won the first place in the Umberto Giordano Singing Contest. Çarkçı also won first place representing Turkey in the Renata Tabeladi Singing Contest, with 99.3 points out of 100. Çarkçı speaks Armenian, Italian, English, Turkish, Latin and Spanish. Jaklin Çarkçı's lung capacity is 115% (an average person being 100%) which she claims allows her to sing better.

Çarkçı claims that she is not only a musician but sees herself as a good example of a contemporary Turkish woman. In her own words: "I am the secular woman of Atatürk's Turkey (Atatürk Türkiye'sinin laik kadınıyım").

== Legacy ==
Her daughter Sirel Yakupoğlu is also an artist of the Istanbul State Opera.

== See also ==
- Armenians in Turkey
