= List of missionary schools in Turkey =

The following is a list of missionary schools founded in Turkey, during the Ottoman Empire. The schools listed are either closed or currently following a secular education model, according to the Constitution of Turkey, which previously outlawed religious education..

== American schools ==
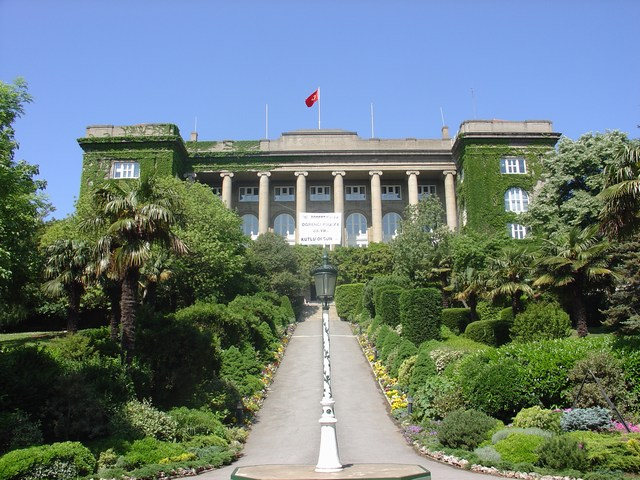
Robert College of Istanbul

- Euphrates College in Harput (1852)
- Robert College of Istanbul (1863)
- Talas American College in Kayseri (1871)
- Central Turkey College in Gaziantep (1874)
- Üsküdar American Academy in Istanbul (1876) (Formerly American Academy for Girls)
- American Collegiate Institute in İzmir (1878)
- Adana American College for Girls (1880)
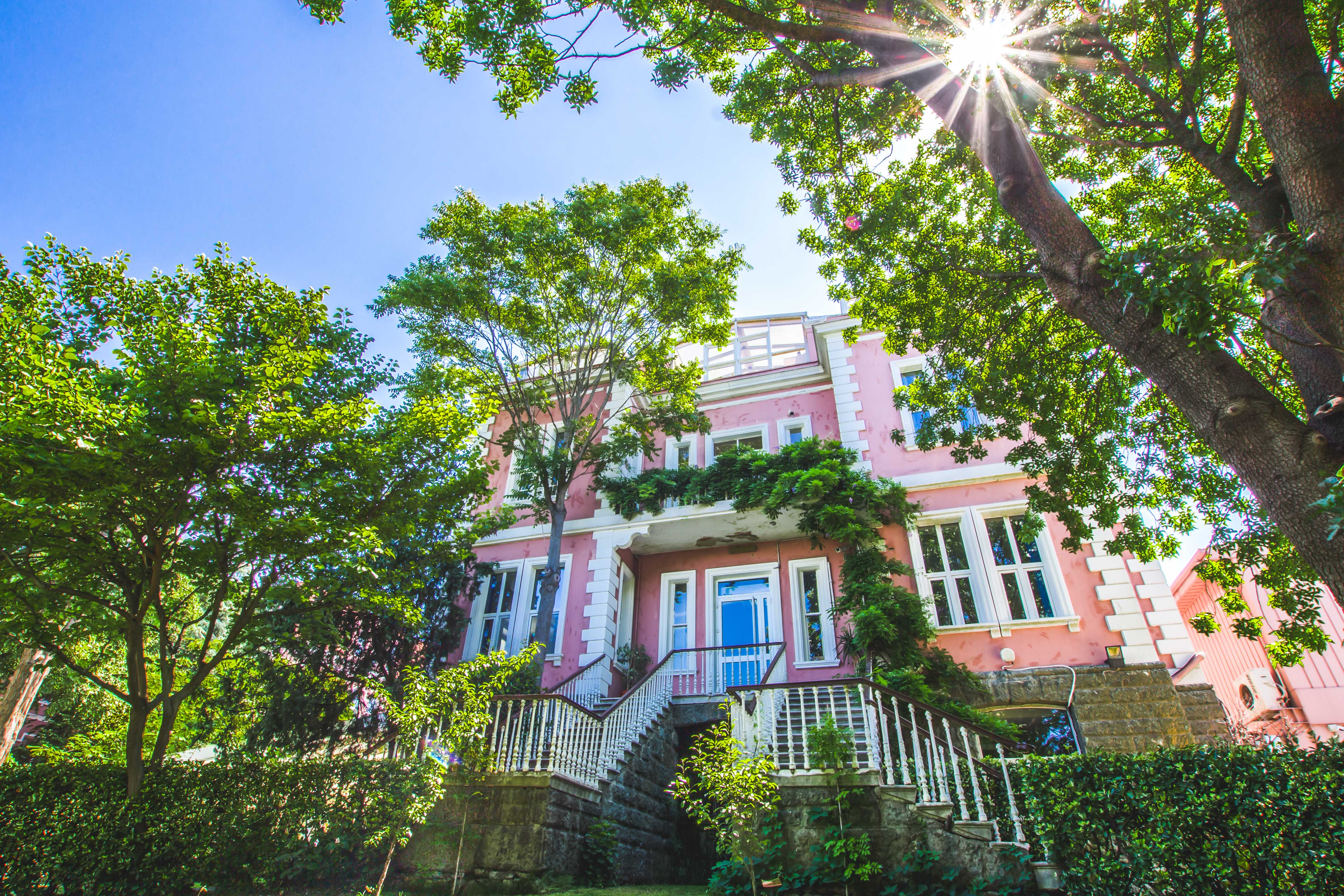
  Üsküdar American Academy
- Anatolia College in Merzifon in Amasya (1886)
- Tarsus American College in Mersin (1888) (Formerly St. Paul's College in Tarsus)
- International College in İzmir (1891) (Currently used as NATO Allied LANDCOM HQ in Izmir)

== Austrian schools ==
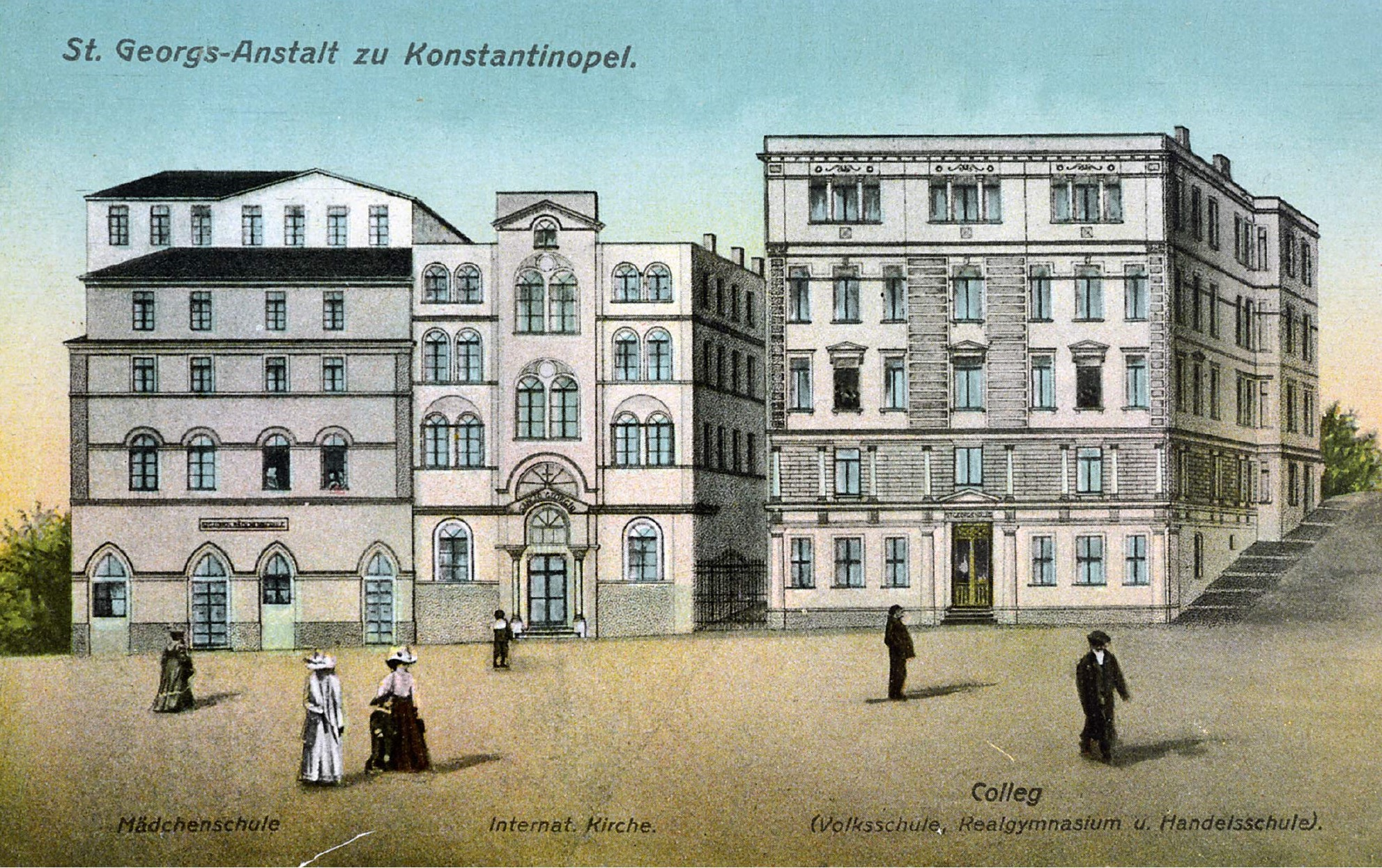
St. George's Austrian High School

- St. George's Austrian High School in Istanbul (1882)

== German schools ==
- Deutsche Schule Istanbul in Istanbul (1868)

== French schools ==
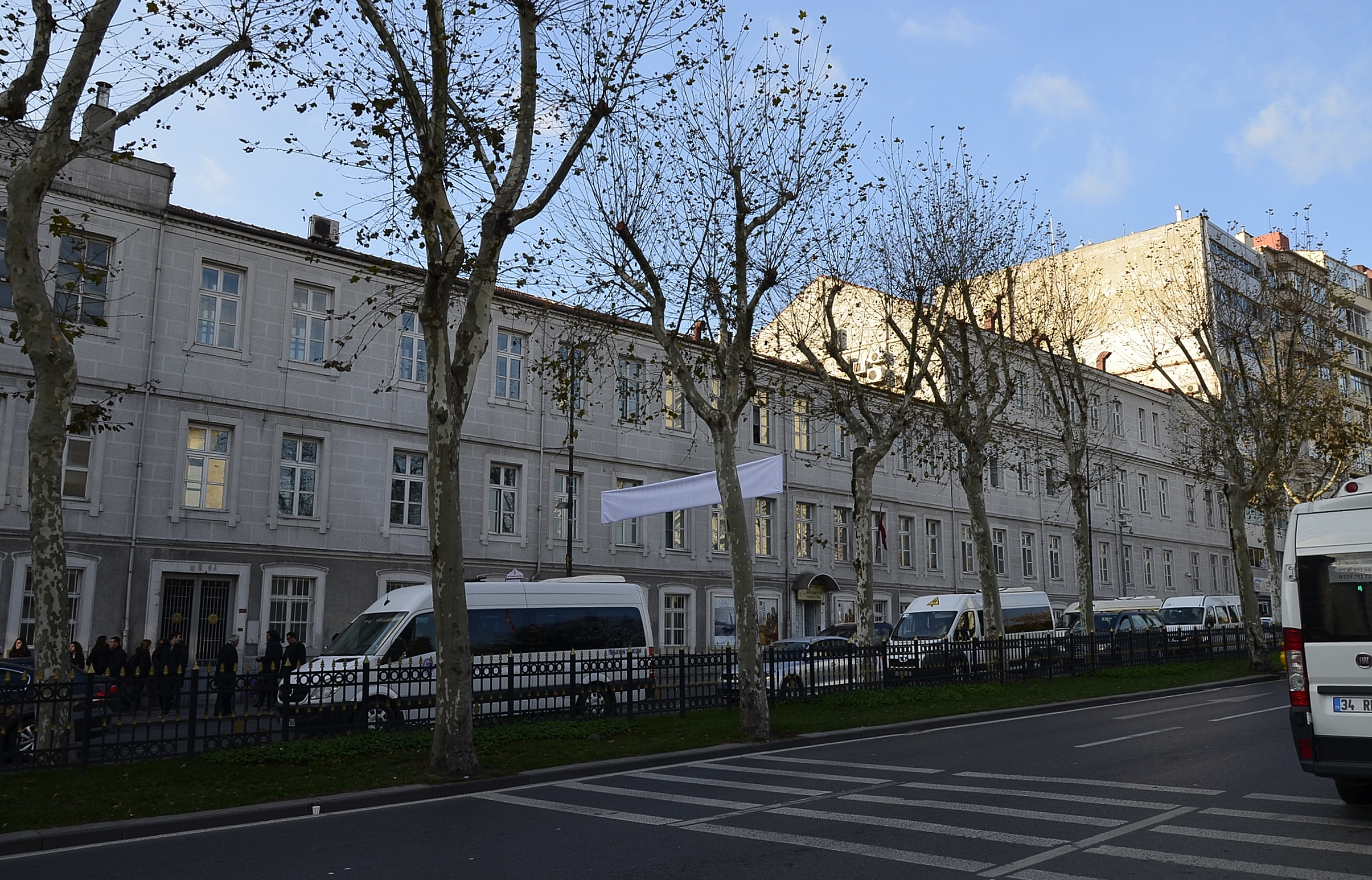
Lycée Français Notre Dame de Sion

- Lycée Français Notre Dame de Sion in Istanbul (1856)
- Lycée Français Saint Joseph d'Istanbul, (1870)
- Lycée Français Saint-Michel in Istanbul (1886)
- Lycée Français Sainte-Euphémie in Istanbul (1895) (Currently Kadıköy Kemal Atatürk Lisesi)
- Lycée Français Sainte Pulchérie in Istanbul (1846)
- Lycée Saint Benoît d'Istanbul (1783)
- Lycée Saint-Joseph d'Izmir (1880)

== Italian schools ==
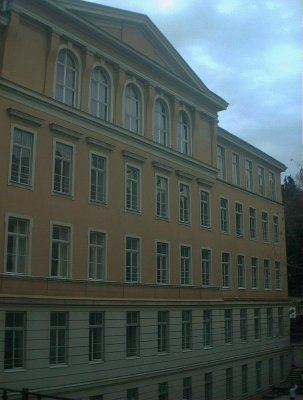
Liceo Italiano di Istanbul

- Liceo Scientifico Italiano I.M.I. in Istanbul (1861)
- Liceo Scientifico Galileo Galilei in Istanbul (1870)

== See also ==
- Education in Turkey
- Education in the Ottoman Empire
- Turkish textbook controversies
- The Twenty Classes
- List of high schools in Turkey
