= Adana American College for Girls =

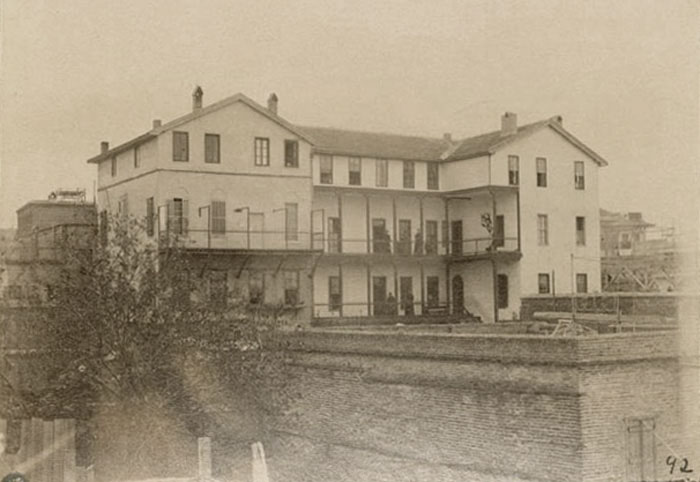
- Adana American College in the early 1900s

Location
- Cemal Gürsel Caddesi, Tepebağ, Seyhan; Adana; Turkey; 36.988343934915704°N 35.32675300508213°E

Information
- Type: Private for girls
- Established: 1880; 146 years ago
- Closed: 1927

Adana American College for Girls was a prominent high school in Adana, Turkey, that served from 1880 to 1927. Founded by the American missionary, protestant teachings of the school mostly attracted students from the Armenian community of the city.

Adana American College was one of the many missionary schools that were founded during the late 19th century in the Ottoman Empire.

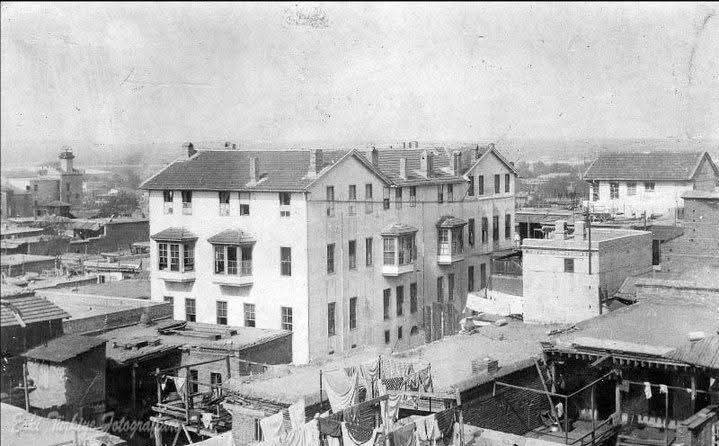
Adana American High School for Girls - Front view

== History ==
The school was opened in 1880 after the construction of the first building, now located at the east side of the school campus. The larger building was built just next to the Cemal Gürsel street in 1914. American High School was closed by the Government of Turkey in 1927, and the school building was used as a state high school (Tepebağ Lisesi) since then.
