= Sedat Bornovalı =

Turkish art historian

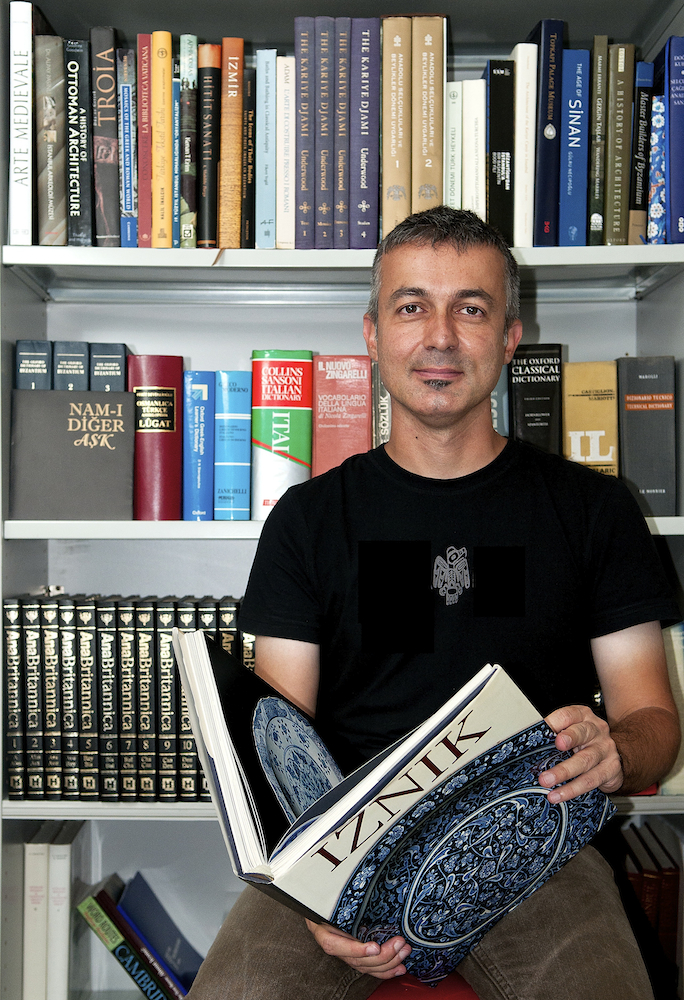
- Born: 31 May 1970 (age 56); Istanbul, Turkey
- Education: Boğaziçi University; Istanbul University; Istanbul Technical University
- Occupations: Art historian, interpreter, tour guide, writer
- Awards: Order of Merit of the Italian Republic

Sedat Bornovalı (born 31 May 1970) is a Turkish art historian (PhD), interpreter, and professional tourist guide. He works in Italian, English, and Turkish. Bornovalı is known for his research on the architectural history of Istanbul, focusing on the interactions between Italian and Ottoman architects, and for his role as a guide and interpreter for visiting heads of state.

== Biography ==
Born in Istanbul, Bornovalı attended the Italian High School of Istanbul. He graduated in Tourism Administration from Boğaziçi University and in Art History and Geography from Istanbul University. He later completed his master's degree and PhD in the History of Architecture at Istanbul Technical University (İTÜ). He serves as an Associate Professor at Nişantaşı University.

== Academic career ==
As an art historian, Bornovalı has contributed to various projects, including the inventory of Seljuk architecture. His research primarily focuses on Byzantine and Ottoman art history, with specific attention to the works of Italian architects in Istanbul, such as Giulio Mongeri and Raimondo D'Aronco.

=== Hagia Sophia ===
Bornovalı has been cited in international media regarding the Hagia Sophia, often analyzing the building's historical stratifications and mosaics. He was the first expert to officially propose the continuation of archaeological excavations within the UNESCO World Heritage complex after an 86-year hiatus. He serves as a scientific consultant for the Hagia Sophia History and Experience Museum.

== Professional activity ==
=== Garibaldi House ===
Bornovalı coordinated the restoration of the Casa Garibaldi in Beyoğlu, the historic seat of the Italian Workers' Society (Società Operaia Italiana di Mutuo Soccorso), founded in 1863. During the restoration, late Roman period graves (4th century AD) were discovered in the basement, marking a significant archaeological find for the district.

=== Cultural and diplomatic role ===
Bornovalı has undertaken interpretation and briefing duties during state visits and diplomatic meetings. He interpreted for the Ecumenical Patriarch Bartholomew I of Constantinople, and for Roman Catholic Popes during their visits to Turkey: Pope Benedict XVI in 2006, and Pope Leo XIV in 2025.

He has also served as an interpreter for Italian statesmen, including President Giorgio Napolitano and Prime Minister Silvio Berlusconi, as well as for Turkish Presidents Abdullah Gül and Recep Tayyip Erdoğan.

== Affiliations ==
Bornovalı served as the Vice President of the Istanbul Tourist Guides' Guild (IRO) from 2002 to 2015, later assuming the role of President in 2015 and serving a second term from 2018 to 2021. Following his tenure at IRO, he was appointed as the Acting President of the Union of Tourist Guides' Chambers (TUREB) between 2021 and 2022.

In addition to his leadership in tourism guidance, Bornovalı holds positions in several cultural heritage organizations. He has been a member of the Board of Trustees of the Cultural Awareness Foundation since 2009. Since 2010, he has served as Vice Chairman of the Turkish Society of Art History, Vice President of the Istanbul Italian High School Alumni Association, and a member of the Turkish Archeological Sites and Museums Consulting Committee.

He also serves on the Advisory Board of the Istanbul Site Management Directorate and was a member of the Advisory Board for the 20th Annual Meeting of the European Association of Archaeologists in 2014.

== Honours and awards ==
=== Orders ===
- 2008 Knight of the Order of Merit of the Italian Republic: Cavaliere Ordine al Merito della Repubblica Italiana
- 2022 Officer of the Order of Merit of the Italian Republic: Ufficiale Ordine al Merito della Repubblica Italiana

=== Awards ===
- Istanbul Tourism Awards – Special Award (2010)
- Skal International – "Quality in Tourism" Award (2011)

== Books ==
- Boğaziçi'nin Tarih Atlası (The Historical Atlas of the Bosphorus) 2018 ISBN 978-605-08-2873-3
  - The Bosphorus: An Illustrated Story. From Prehistory to The Eurasia Tunnel 2019 ISBN 978-605-08-3019-4
  - Il Bosforo Una Storia Illustrata 2025 ISBN 978-625-6767-52-2
- Tarihin En Uzun Şiiri Ayasofya (Hagia Sophia: The Longest Poem in History) 2020 ISBN 978-605-08-3242-6
  - Ayasofya (Fleksi Kapak) (Hagia Sophia (Flexi Cover)) 2020 ISBN 978-605-08-4546-4
  - Santa Sofia. Il poema più lungo della storia (Hagia Sophia: The Longest Poem in History - Italian ed.) 2021 ISBN 978-605-08-4663-8
- Müzelik Müzeler (Museum-worthy Museums) 2021 ISBN 978-625-78443-6-9
- Santa Maria Draperis & Beyoğlu'nda 400 Yıllık Bir Katolik Mabedi (Santa Maria Draperis & A 400-Year-Old Catholic Sanctuary in Beyoğlu) 2021 ISBN 978-625-74778-1-9
- Surp Yerrortutyun Katolik Ermeni Kilisesi (Holy Trinity Armenian Catholic Church) 2025 ISBN 978-625-6270-79-4
