= Van, Turkey =

City in eastern Turkey

Van
- City
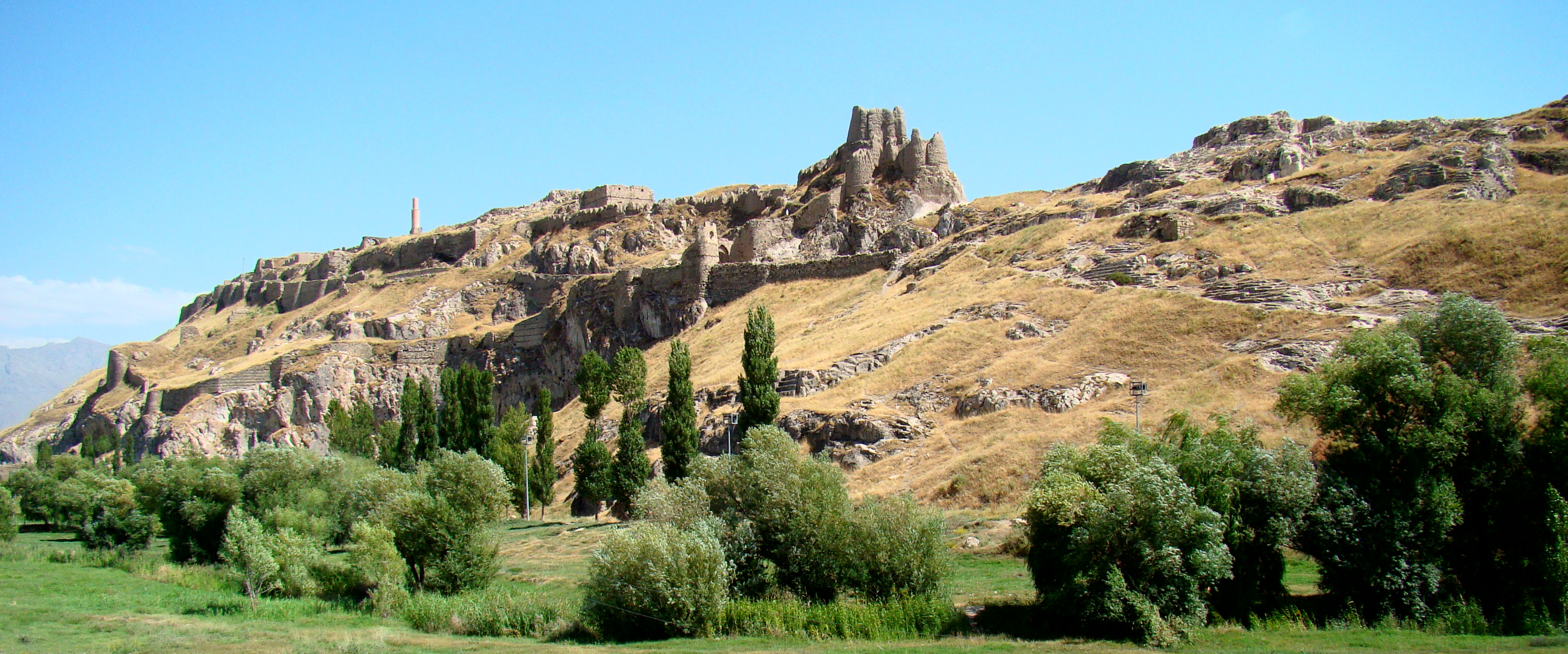
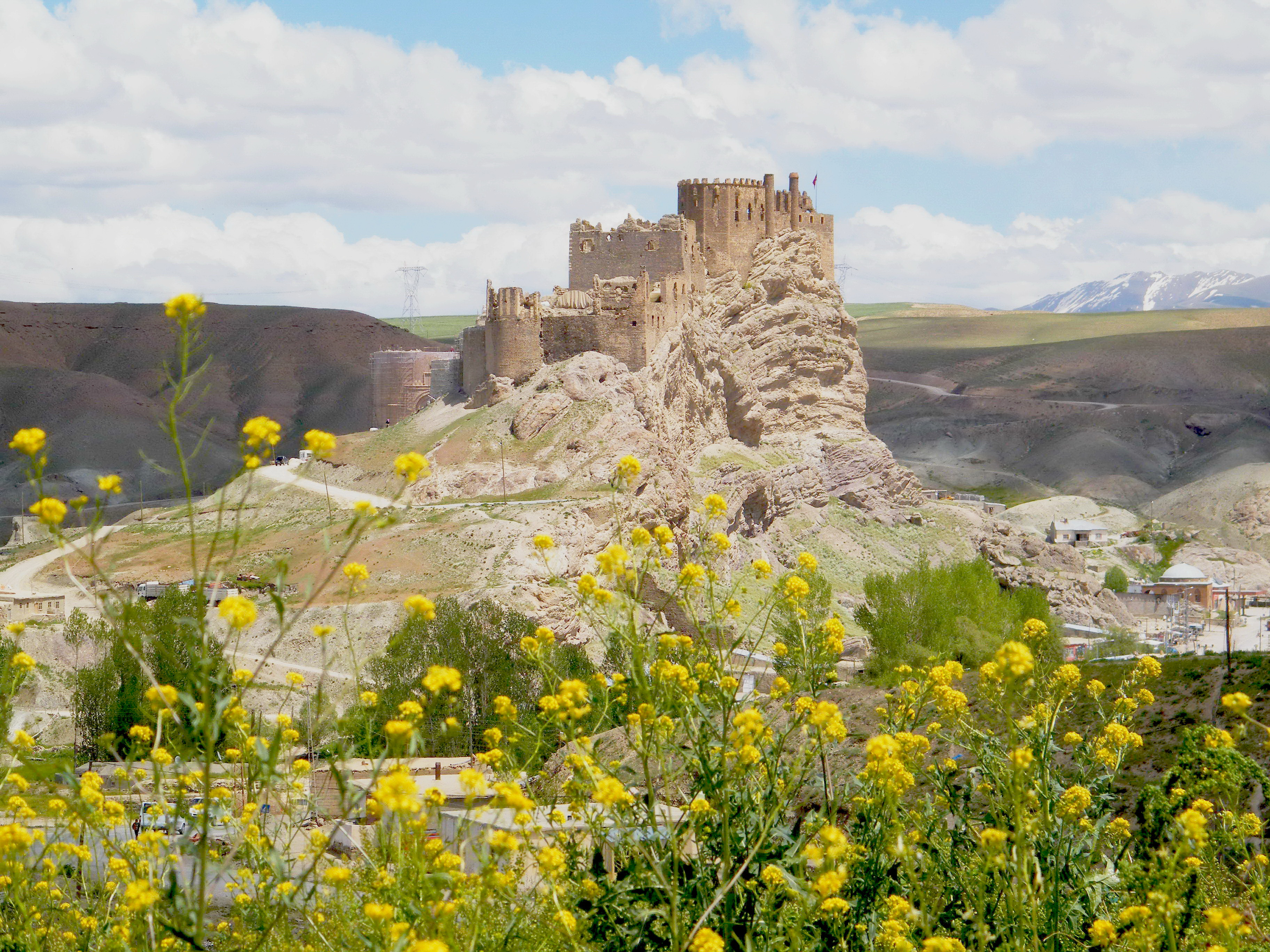
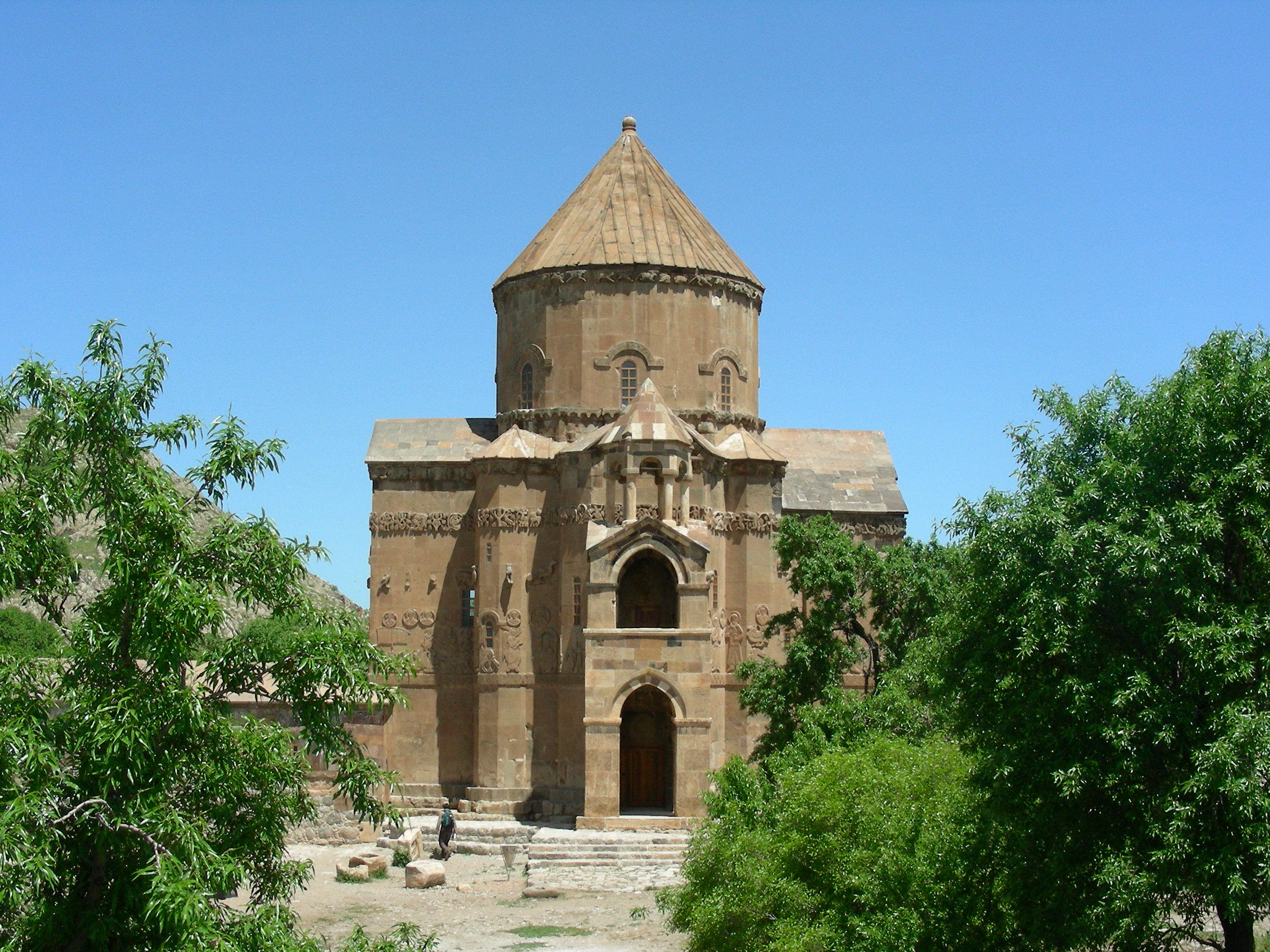
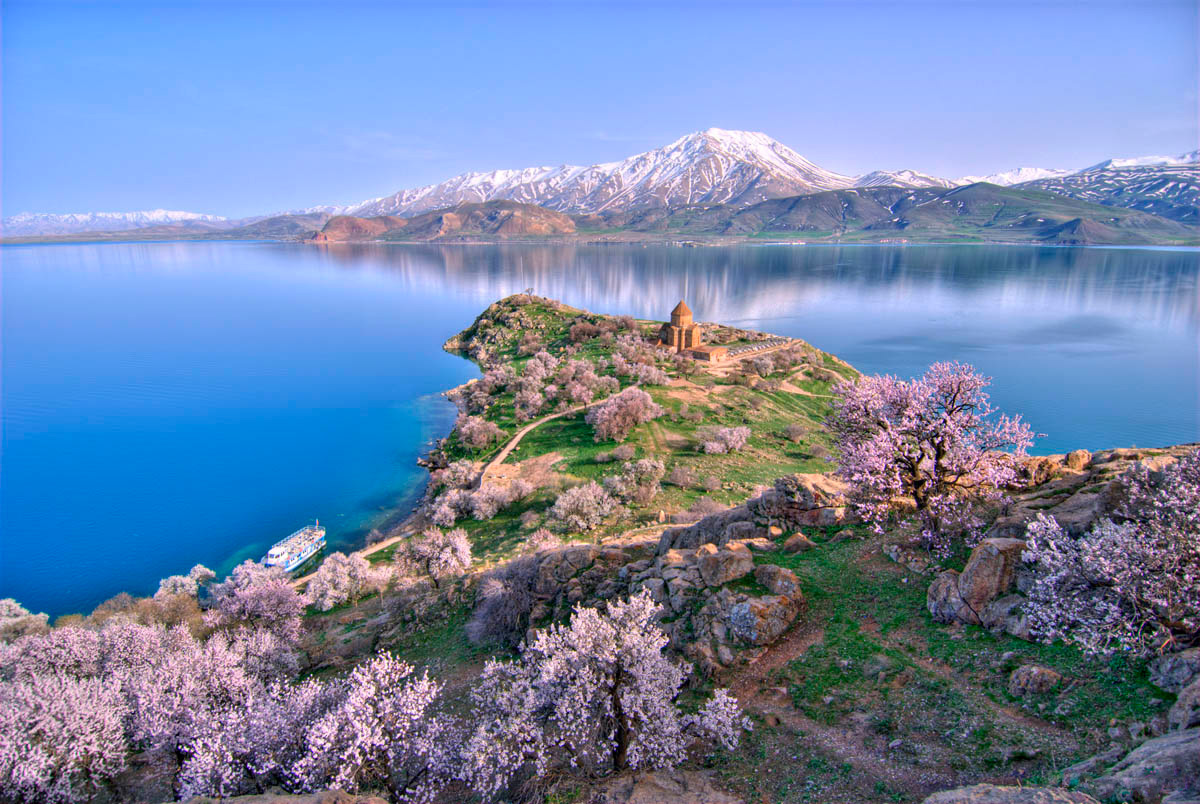
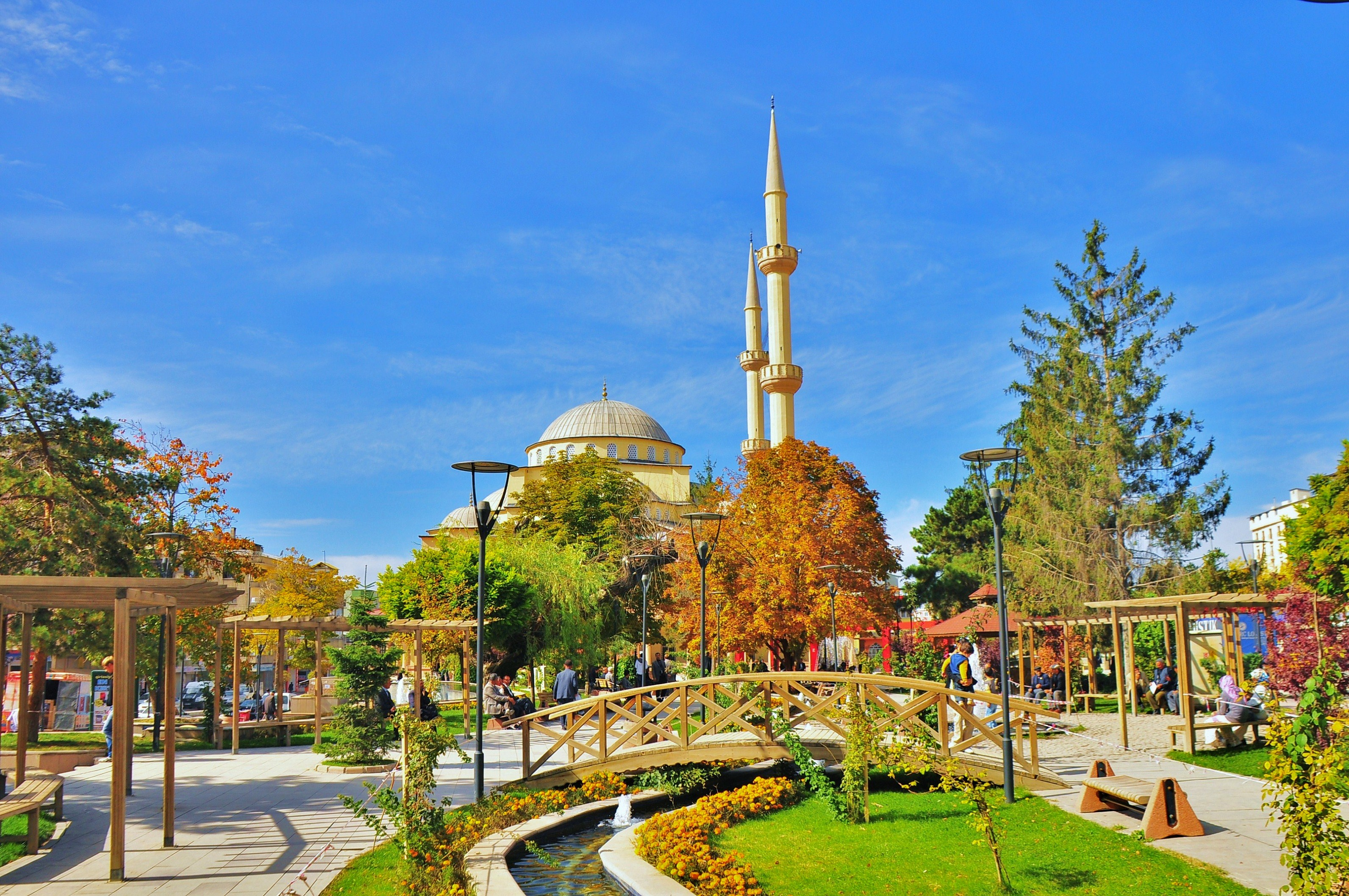
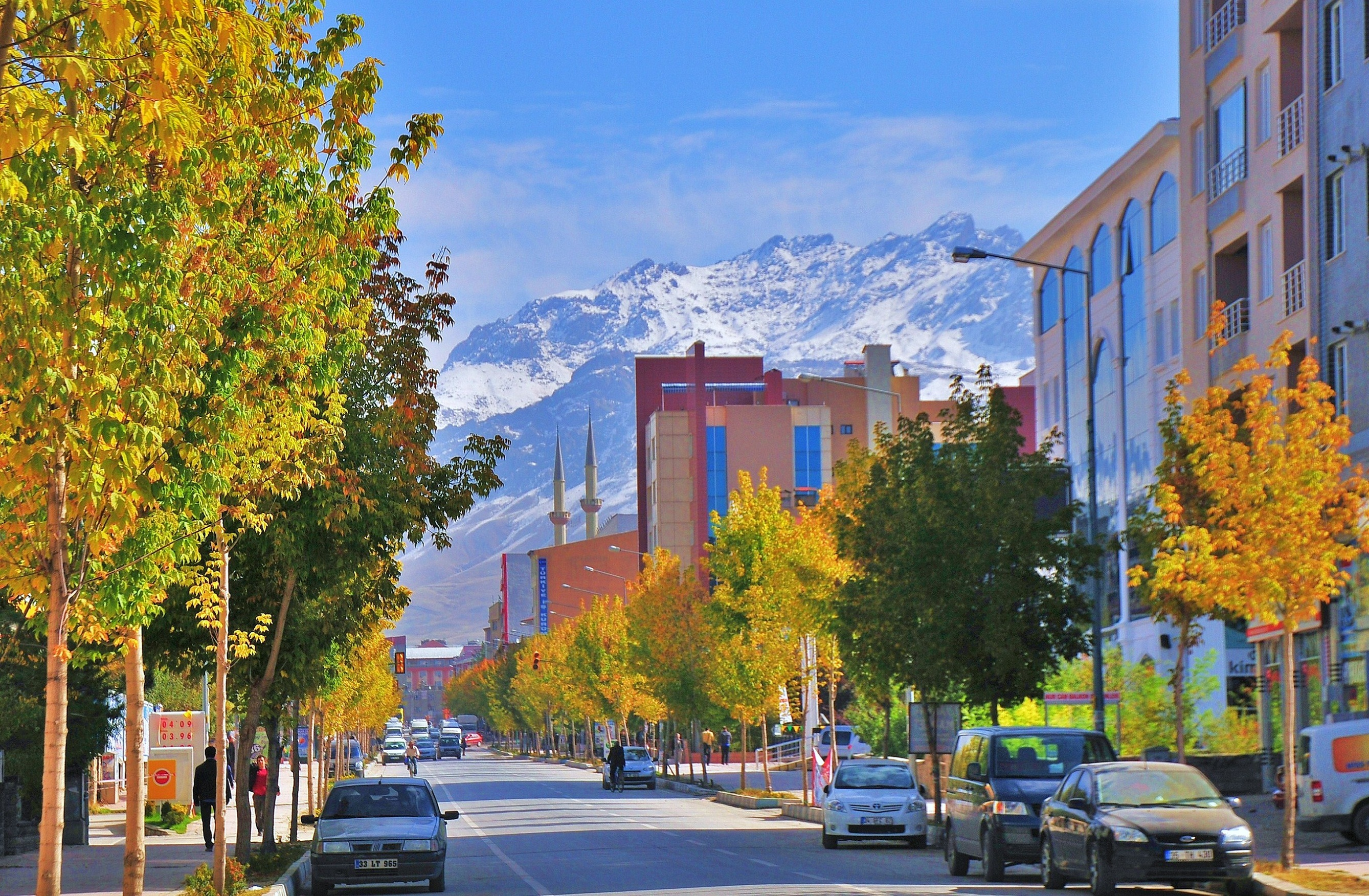
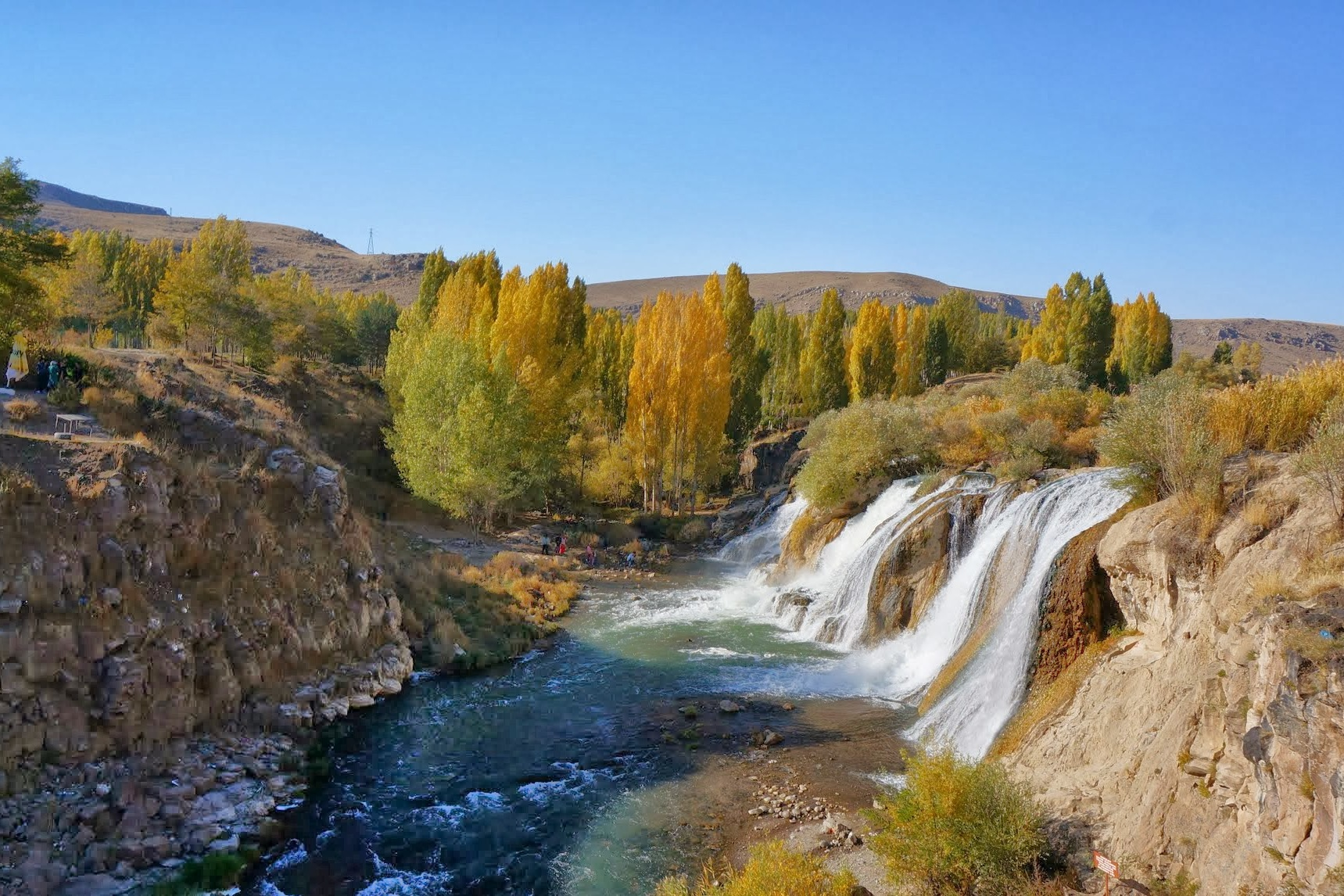
- Clockwise from top: Van Fortress; Cathedral of the Holy Cross, Aghtamar; Tushba; Muradiye Waterfalls; İskele Street; Van Lake; and Hoşap Castle

- Emblem of Van Municipality

- Location within Turkey
- Coordinates: 38°29′39″N 43°22′48″E
- Country: Turkey
- Region: Eastern Anatolia
- Province: Van

Government
  - Mayor: Ozan Balcı (State Appointment)
- Elevation: 1,726 m (5,663 ft)

Population (2025)
  - Urban: 530 574
- Time zone: UTC+3 (TRT)
- Website: www.van.bel.tr

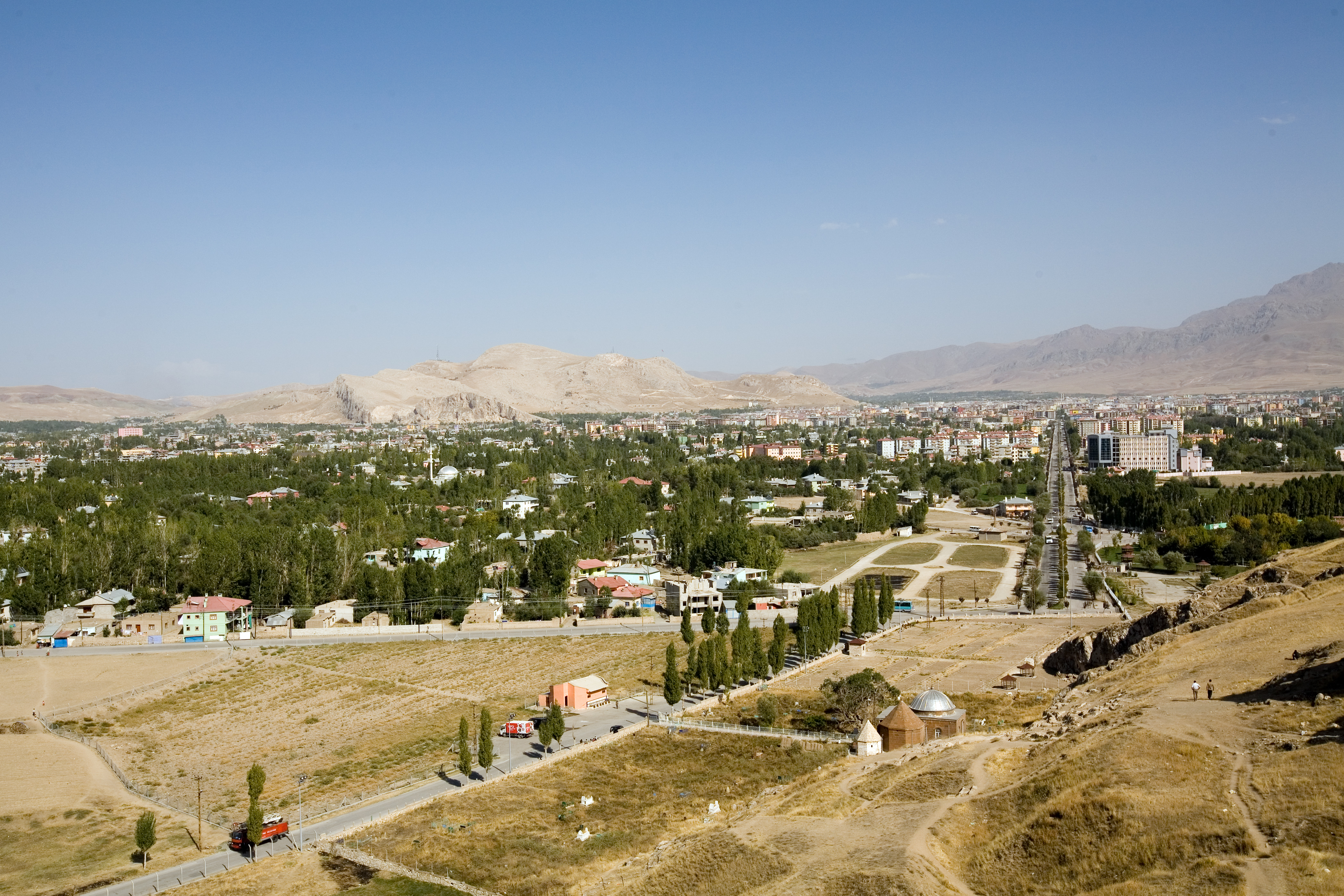
City of Van (view from Van Kalesi)

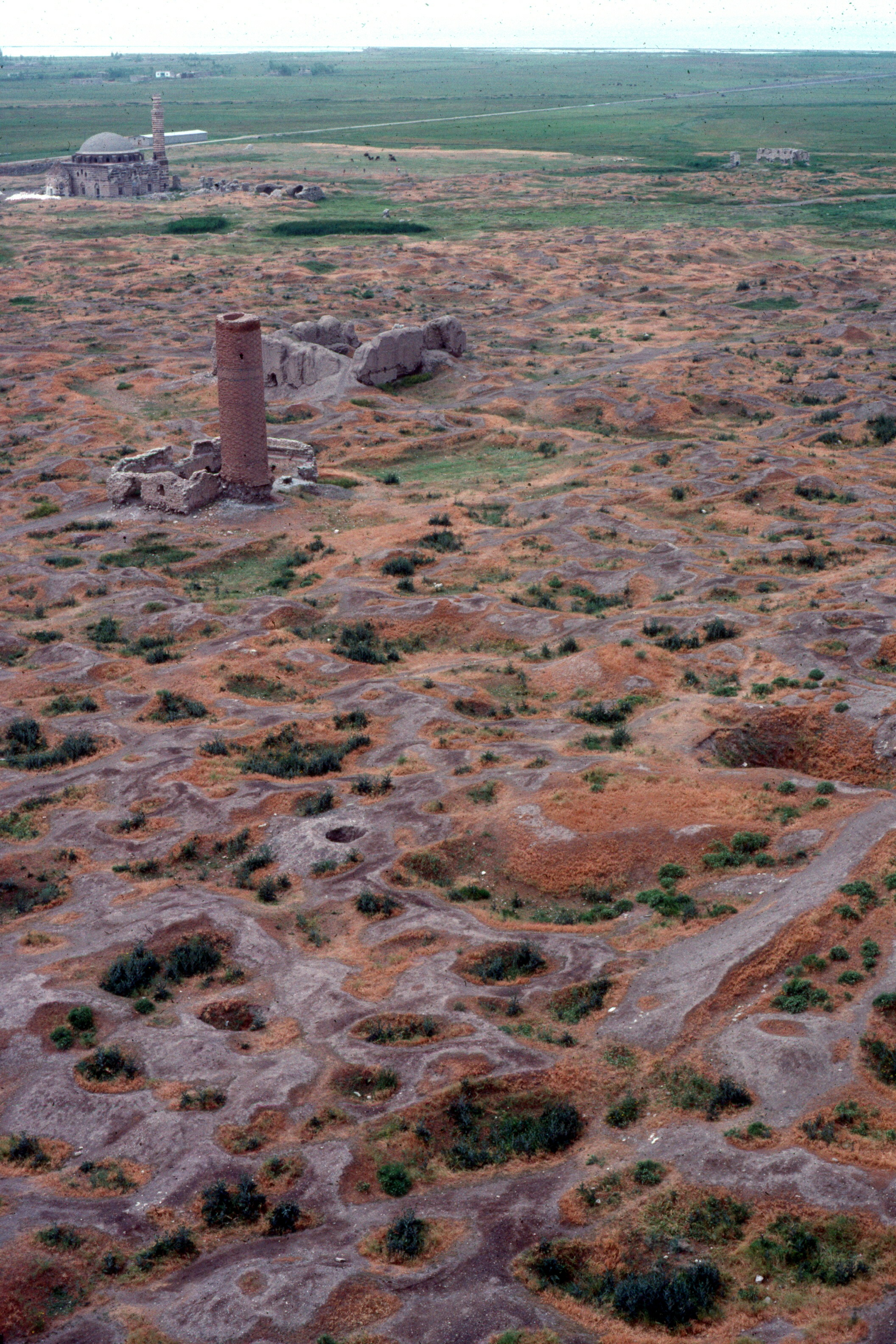
Ruins of ancient Van

Van (Note: Armenian: Վան; Kurdish: Wan; Syriac: ܘܢ) is a city in eastern Turkey's Van Province, on the eastern shore of Lake Van. It is the capital and largest city of Van Province.

Van has a long history as a major urban area. It has been a large city since the first millennium BCE, initially as Tushpa, the capital of the kingdom of Urartu from the 9th century BCE to the 6th century BCE, and later as the center of the Armenian kingdom of Vaspurakan. Turkic presence in Van and in the rest of Anatolia started as a result of Seljuk victory at the Battle of Malazgirt (1071) against the Byzantine Empire.

Van was densely populated by Armenians until the Armenian genocide in the 1910s. Today, it is mostly inhabited by Kurds.

== History ==
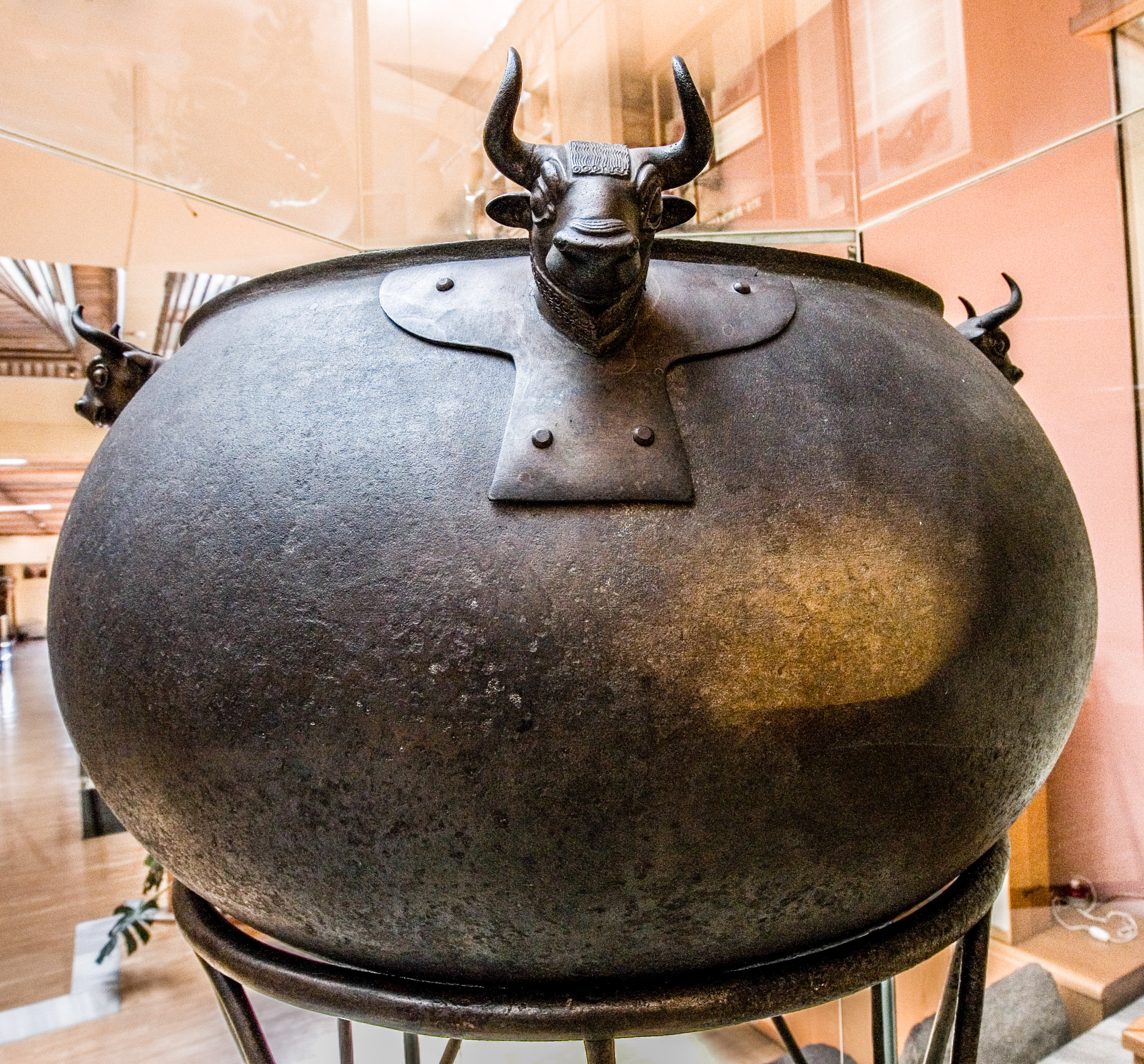
An Urartian cauldron at the Museum of Anatolian Civilizations

Archaeological excavations and surveys carried out in Van Province indicate that the history of human settlement in this region goes back at least as far as 5000 BCE. The Tilkitepe Mound, which is on the shores of Lake Van and a few kilometres to the south of Van Castle, is the only source of information about the oldest culture of Van.

=== Urartu ===
Inscription of Xerxes the Great on the cliffs below Van castle

Under the ancient name of Tushpa, Van was the capital of the Urartian kingdom in the 9th century BCE. The early settlement was centered on the steep-sided bluff now known as Van Castle (Van Kalesi), close to the edge of Lake Van and a few kilometers west of the modern city. Urartian cuneiform inscriptions dating to the 8th and 7th centuries BCE have been found here. The name 'Van' comes from the Urartian endonym Biaina. A "conservative" estimate by Charles A. Burney put the population of Tushpa and its suburbs at 50,000.

=== Kingdom of Armenia ===
The region came under the control of the Orontids in the 7th century BCE and quickly later the Persians in the mid-6th century BCE. Van Fortress, located outside Van city center, holds an inscribed stereotyped trilingual inscription of Xerxes the Great from the 5th century BCE upon a smoothed section of the rock face, some 20 metres (66 feet) above the ground near the fortress. The inscription survives in near perfect condition and is divided into three columns of 27 lines written in (from left to right) Old Persian, Babylonian, and Elamite. In 331 BCE, Van was conquered by Alexander the Great and after his death became part of the Seleucid Empire. By the early 2nd century BCE it was part of the Kingdom of Armenia. It became an important center during the reign of the Armenian king, Tigranes II, who founded the city of Tigranakert in the 1st century BCE. In the early centuries BCE, it fell to the emerging Arsacid dynasty of Parthia until the 3rd century CE. However, it also fell once to the Arsacid dynasty of Armenia in this timespan. In the History of Armenia attributed to Movses Khorenatsi, the city is called Tosp, from Urartian Tushpa.

=== Byzantines, Sassanids, and the Artsrunis ===
Historical affiliations

Urartu 832 BC–590 BC
Satrapy of Armenia 570 BC–321 BC
Kingdom of Armenia 321 BC–428 AD
Armenian Marzbanate 428–646
Arminiya 654–884
Bagratid Armenia 884–1024
↳Kingdom of Vaspurakan 908–1024
Byzantine Empire 1024–1071
Seljuk Empire 1071–1100s
Mongol Empire 1240s–1330s
Safavid Empire 1502–1515, 1520–1548, 1604–1639
Ottomans 1515–1520, 1548–1604, 1639–1915
Republic of Armenia 1918–1920
Turkey 1922–Present

Following the fall of the Parthians and the emergence of the Neo-Persian Empire, better known as the Sasanian Empire, the town fell into the possession of the latter. During the over 700 years-long Roman-Persian Wars, some of the wars were waged at and around the location of modern-day Van. The Byzantine Empire briefly held the region from 628 to 640, following the victory in the climactic Byzantine–Sasanian War of 602–628, after which it was invaded by the Muslim Arabs, who consolidated their conquests as the province of Arminiya. Decline in Arab power eventually allowed local Armenian rulers to re-emerge, with the Artsruni dynasty soon becoming the most powerful. Initially dependent on the rulers of the Kingdom of Ani, they declared their independence in 908, founding the Armenian Kingdom of Vaspurakan. The kingdom had no specific capital: the court would move as the king transferred his residence from place to place, such as Van city, Vostan, Aghtamar, etc. In 1021 the last king of Vaspurakan, John-Senekerim Artsruni, ceded his entire kingdom to the Byzantine Empire, which established the Vaspurakan theme on the former Artsruni territories. Van was called Eua or Eva (Ancient Greek: Εύα) during Byzantine rule.

=== Seljuk Empire and Rum ===
Incursions by the Seljuk Turks into Vaspurakan started in the 1050s. After their victory in 1071 at the battle of Manzikert, the entire region fell under their control. After them, local Muslim rulers emerged, such as the Ahlatshahs and the Kurdish Ayyubids (1207). For a 20-year period, Van was held by the Anatolian Seljuk Sultanate until the 1240s when it was conquered by the Mongols. In the 14th century, Van was held by the Timurids, followed by the Turkoman Kara Koyunlu and Ak Koyunlu confederations.

=== Turco-Iranian rivalry and the Ottoman era ===
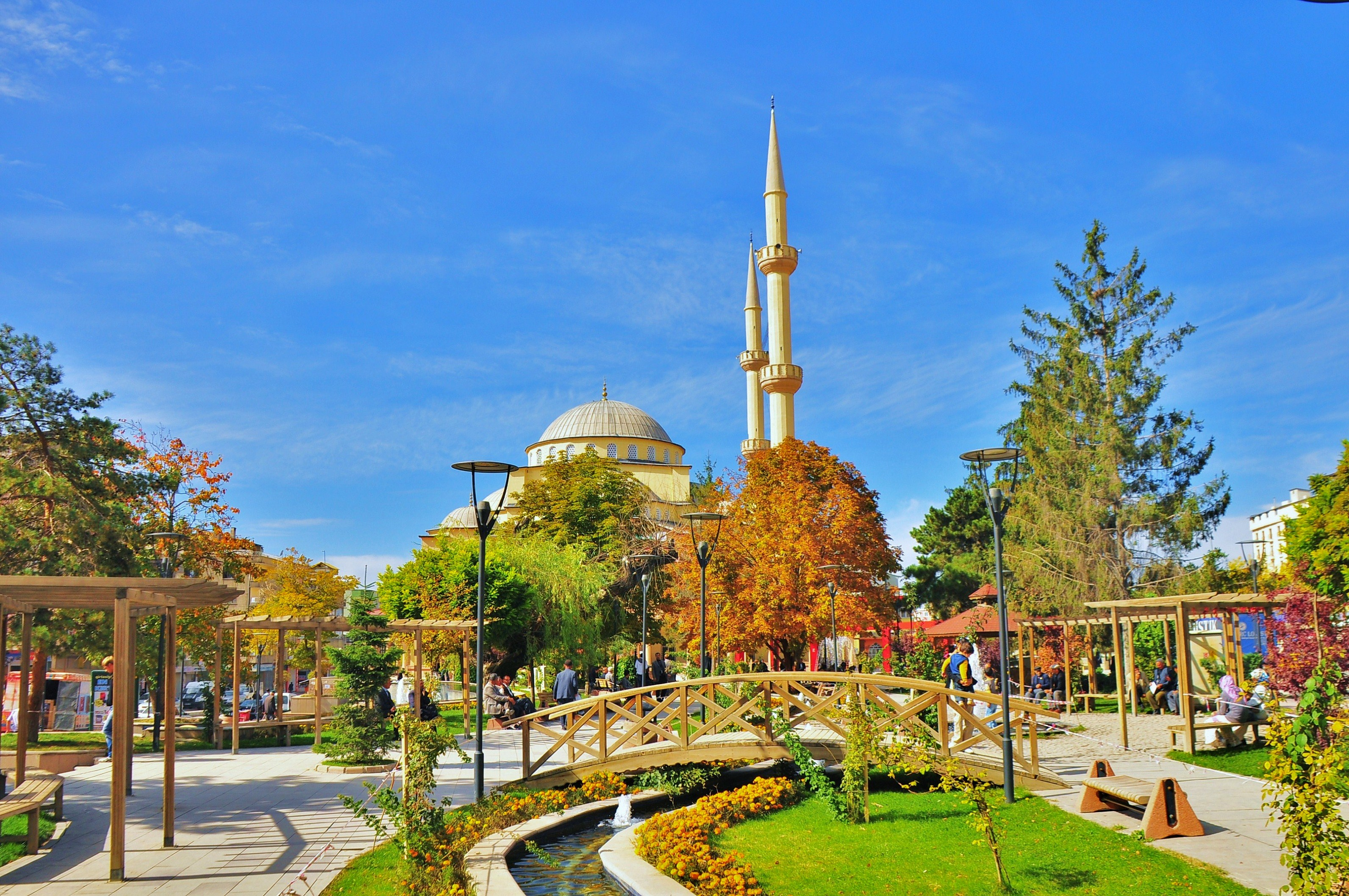
Hz. Ömer Mosque in Van

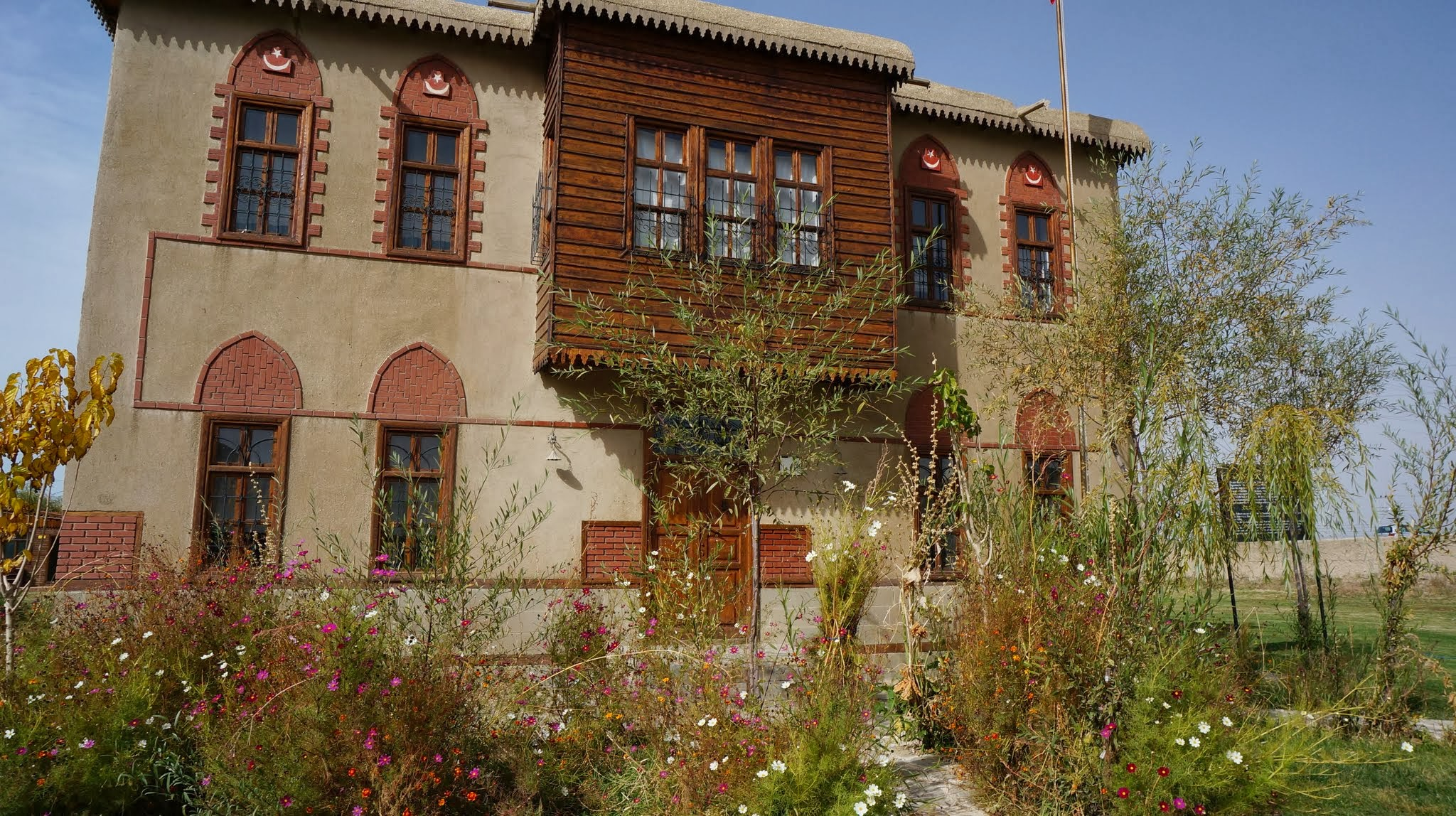
A replica of a 19th-century house

The first half of the 15th century saw the Van region become a land of conflict as it was disputed by the Ottoman Empire and the neighboring Persian Safavid Empire. The Safavids captured Van in 1502, as it went naturally with all former territories of the Ak Koyunlu. The Ottomans took the city in 1515 following the climactic Battle of Chaldiran and held it for a short period. The Safavids retook it in 1520 but the Ottomans gained an almost definite hold of it in 1548 during another Ottoman-Safavid war. Ottoman control over the town was confirmed in the 1555 Peace of Amasya which came as a result after the end of the war. They first made Van into a sanjak dependent on the Erzurum eyalet, and later into a separate Van eyalet in about 1570. In 1604, the Safavids under king Abbas the Great recaptured Van alongside other swaths of lost territories in Eastern Anatolia. However, Ottoman control over it was at last now made final and definite in 1639 with the Treaty of Zuhab.

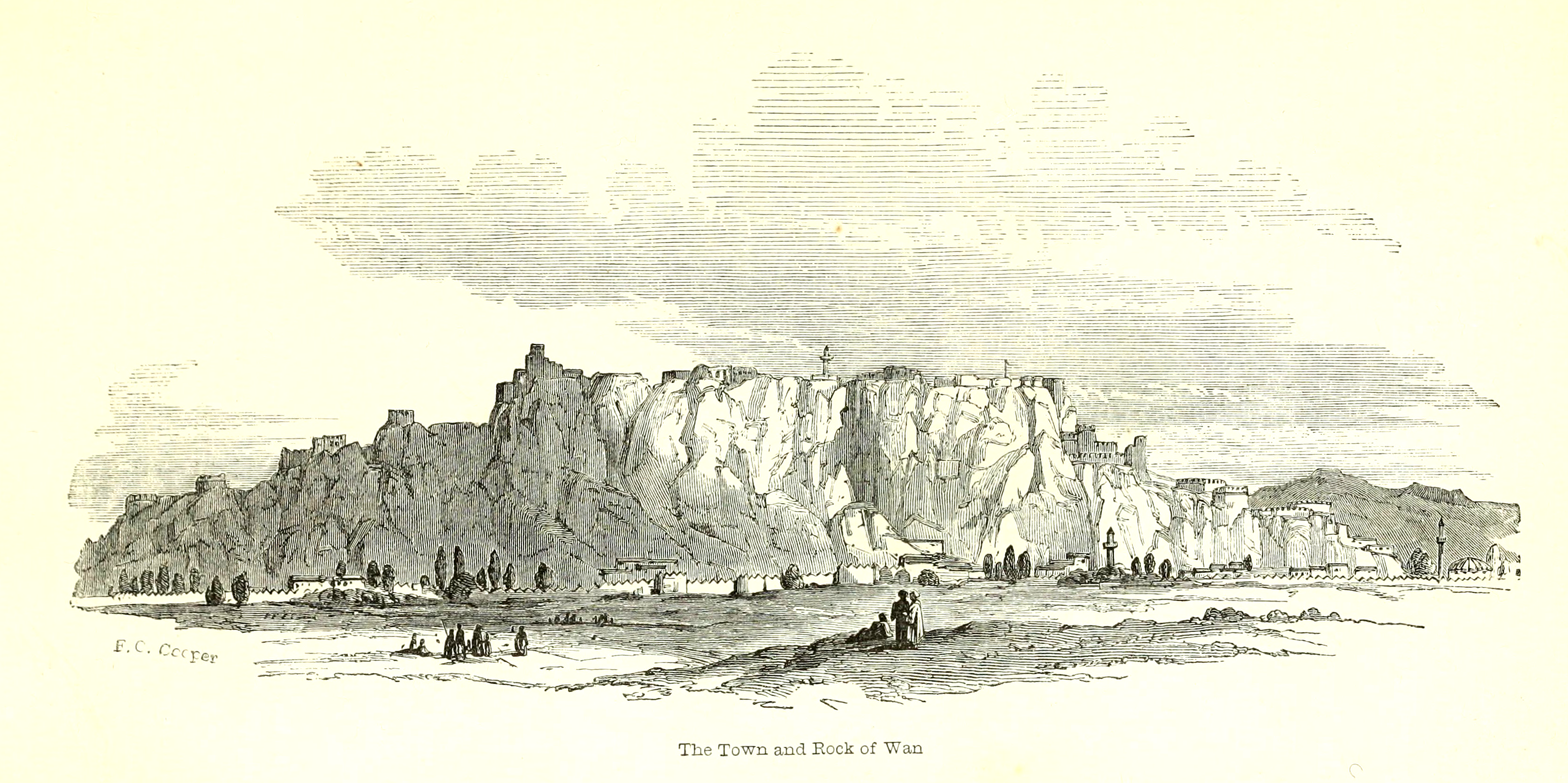
Van from Joseph Pitton de Tournefort's 1717 book Relation d'un voyage du Levant

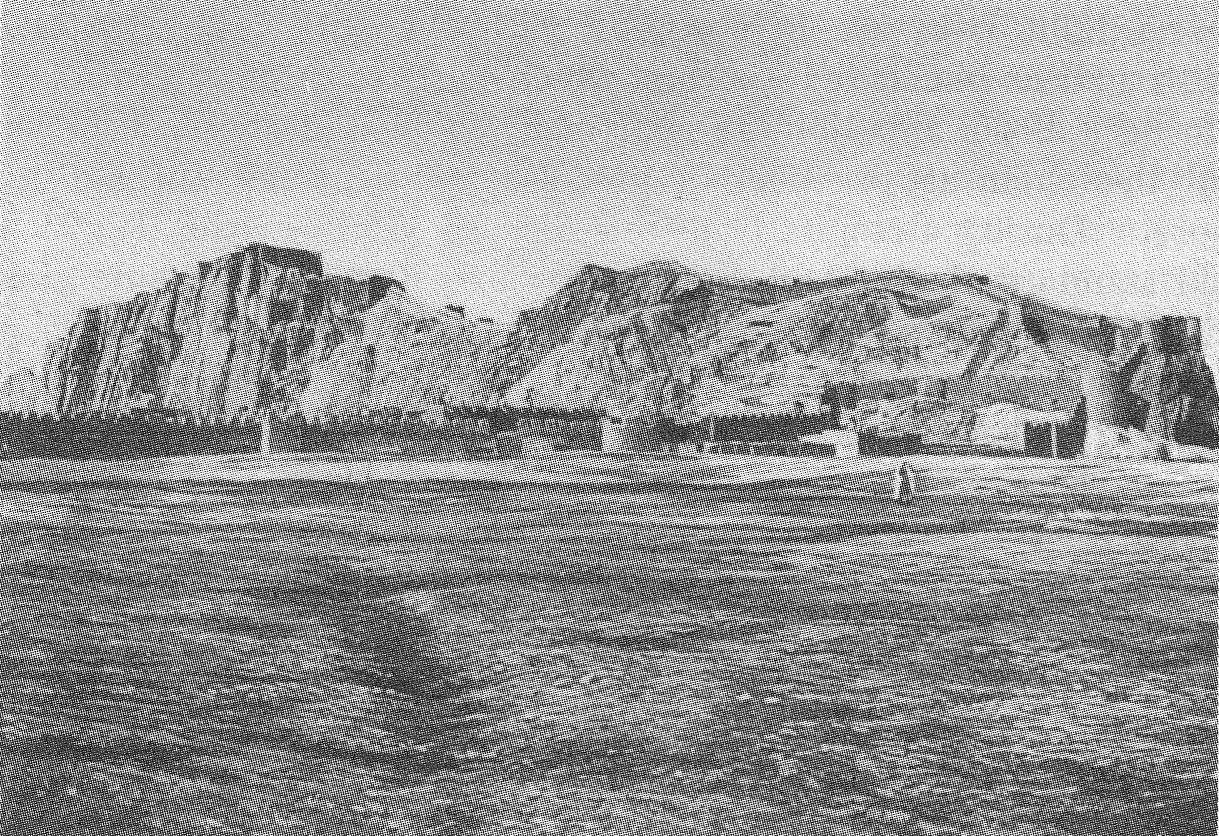
The rock and walled city of Van in 1893 by H. F. B. Lynch

During the early 1900s, the city of Van had eleven Armenian schools and ten Turkish schools. Towards the second half of the 19th century Van began to play an increased role in the politics of the Ottoman Empire due to its location near the borders of the Persian, Russian and Ottoman Empire, as well as its proximity to Mosul. During the period leading up to the breakup of the Ottoman Empire, Armenians were well represented in the local administration.

==== Ottoman Era demographics ====
The demographics of Ottoman Van are a debated and contentious point as they relate directly to claims of ownership by either side prior to the outbreak of World War I. For the city of Van itself it has been estimated that it had around 50,000 inhabitants prior to World War I, of whom 30,000 were Armenian and 20,000 were Muslims. Based on the official 1914 Ottoman census, the population of Van province consisted of 179,422 Muslims and 67,797 Armenians. The Ottoman census figures include only male citizens, excluding women and children, and according to more recent research, an estimate for Van province (including women and children) is that it had 313,000 Muslims, 130,000 Armenians, and 65,000 others, including Assyrians.

The demographics of Van are a greatly debated point also given the changing provincial borders. For example, in 1875 the province was divided; Van and Hakkari were separated, only to be rejoined in 1888, drastically changing the census numbers. Some writers argue that this merging was done to keep the Armenians from forming a majority. In 1862 it was estimated that in Van there were 90,100 Christians (including Syriac Christians) and 95,100 Muslims. The French Consul in Van reported that in Van and Bitlis 51.46% were Kurds, 32.70% were Armenians and 5.53% were Turks. On the other hand, the Armenian Patriarchate of Constantinople estimated 185,000 Armenians in Van, 18,000 Assyrians, 72,000 Kurds, 47,000 Turks, 25,000 Yezidis, 5,000 Zazas and 3,000 Gypsies. Both sides have been accused of over-counting the numbers at the time given the Armenian genocide and population statistics became important during the Berlin Conference.

=== The Russo-Turkish War of 1877–1878 ===
During this war the Kurdish Sheikh Jelaludin led thousands of soldiers to massacre Armenians of the province and destroyed and plundered many of their villages. These events are described in Armenia and the Campaign of 1877 by British war correspondent Charles B. Norman and in the fictional novella Jalaleddin by the Armenian novelist Raffi in very similar terms.

=== World War I and Armenian genocide ===
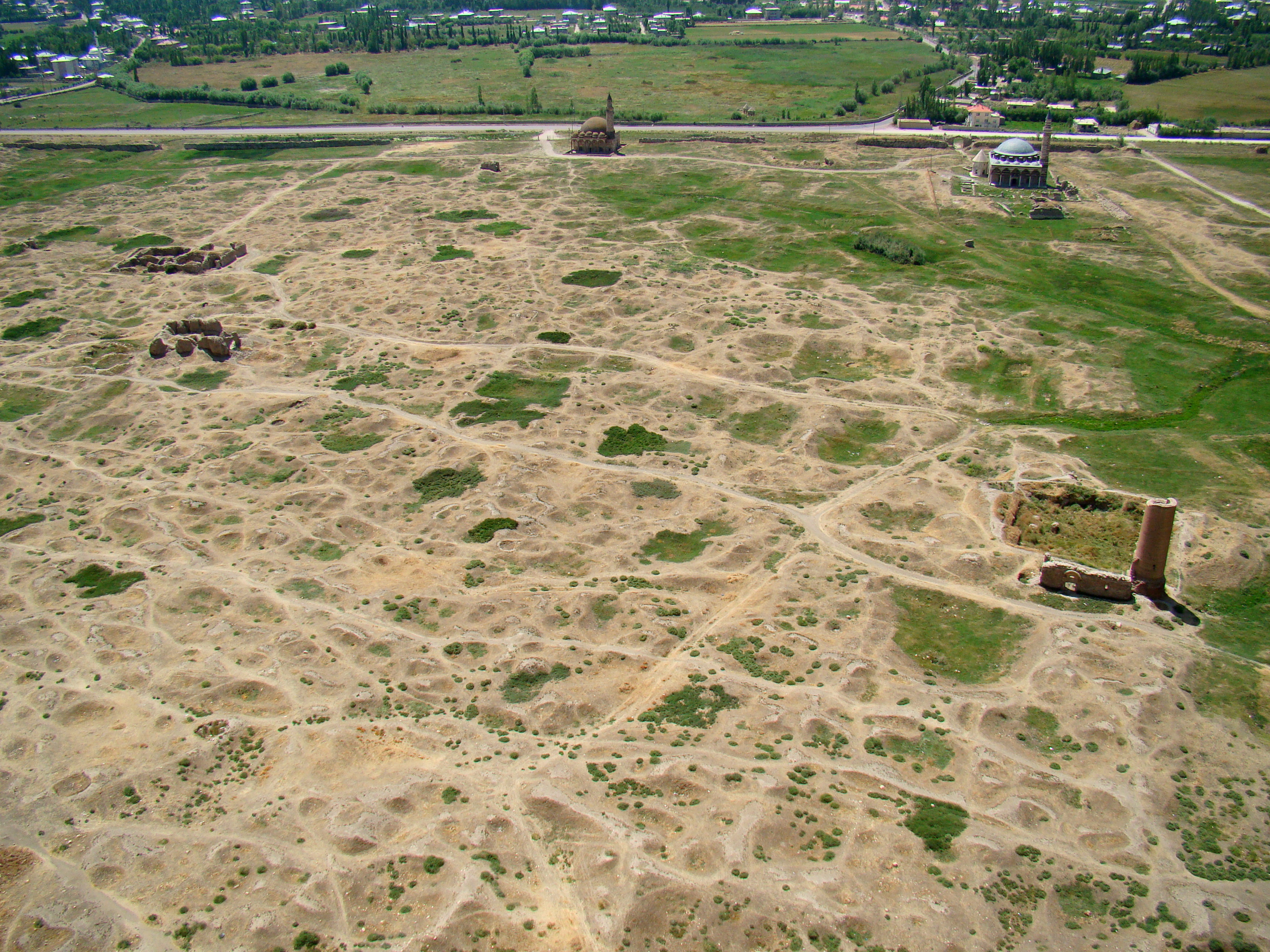
Ruins of the old walled city of Van seen from the castle rock

The Armenian genocide in Van Province started in late 1914 with attacks by the Ottoman Empire's Special Organization and affiliated paramilitaries. The regional Albanian administrator, Djevdet Bey, was reported to have said that "We have cleansed the Armenians and Syriac Christians from Azarbaijan, and we will do the same in Van". Numerous reports from Ottoman officials, such as a parliament deputy, the governor of Aleppo as well as the German consul in Van, suggested that deliberate provocations against the Armenians were being orchestrated by the local government. In mid-April 1915, Cevdet Bey ordered the execution of four Armenian leaders, and he demanded that all Armenian males of military age gather before him, which drove the Armenians to take up arms in self-defense. On the other hand, historian and sociologist Taner Akçam acknowledges that in the case of Van, the deportations may have been driven by military necessity and states the resistance in Van should be examined as a separate case, although this is very similar to official turkish positions denying the Armenian Genocide.

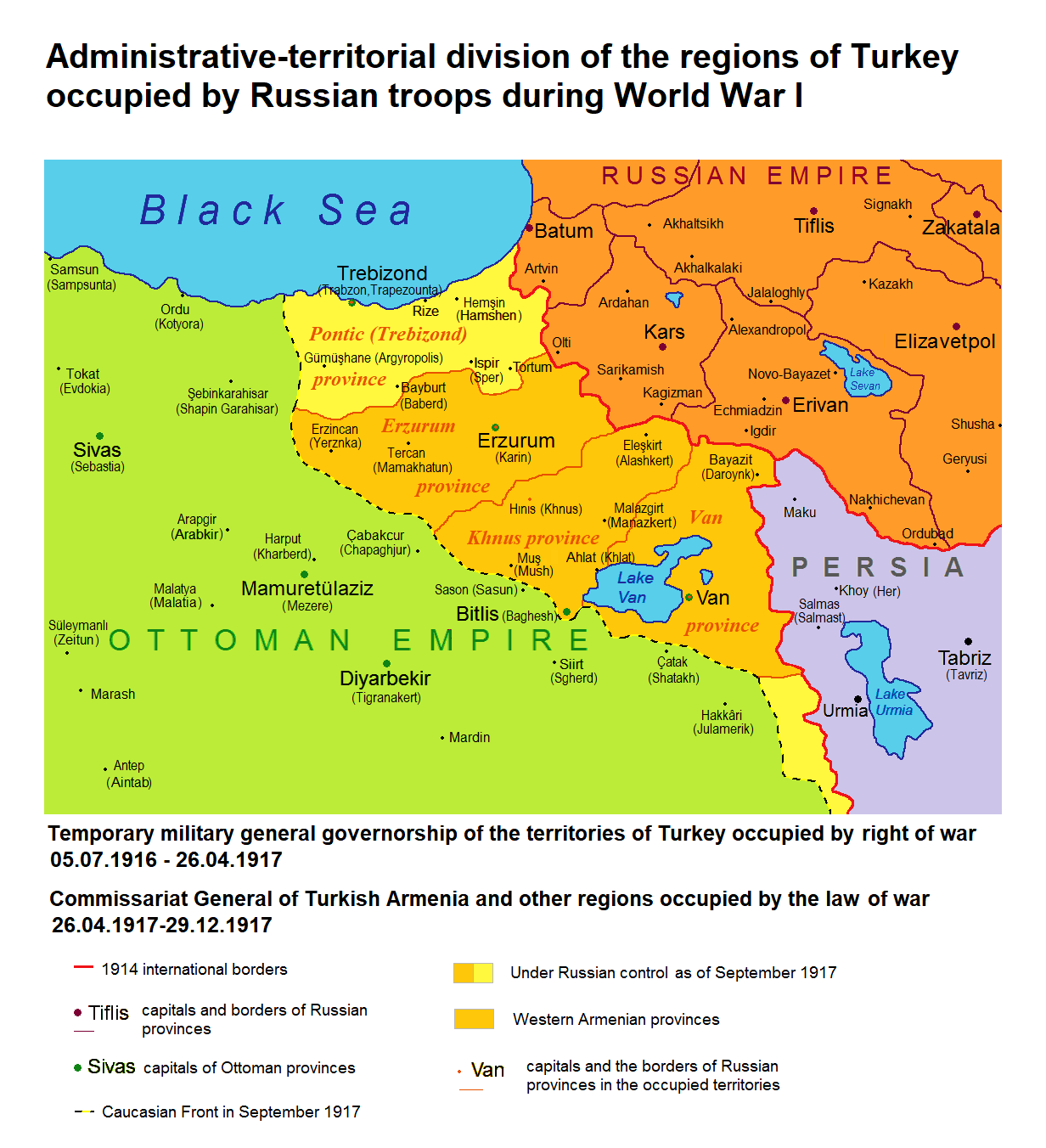
Van region in the administrative-territorial division of the regions of Turkey occupied by Russian troops during World War I 1916–1917

In April 1915, as slaughter was being inflicted upon the rural populations surrounding Van, the Armenian residents of the city launched a rebellion hoping to avoid the same fate, defending themselves in the Armenian quarters of the city against the Turks. The Russians finally relieved the Armenian defenders of Van in late May 1915 and local Armenians gave the keys of the city to Russian general Nikolai Yudenich on May 21. In August, a victory over the Russian army allowed the Ottoman army to retake Van. In September 1915, the Russians forced the Turks out of Van for the second time. Russian forces began to leave the area after the October Revolution in Russia in 1917, and by April 1918, it was recaptured by the Ottoman army again. According to Taner Akçam, citing the Osmanli Belgelerinde Ermeniler 1915–1920 (Armenians in Ottoman Documents, 1915–1920), after the Turks took back the city from the Russians, they killed the Armenian population in the city. Clarence Ussher, an American physician and missionary in Van, and an eye-witness to the events, reported that 55,000 Armenians had been killed. The end of World War I forced the Ottoman army to surrender its claim to Van.

=== Turkish War of Independence and Republic ===
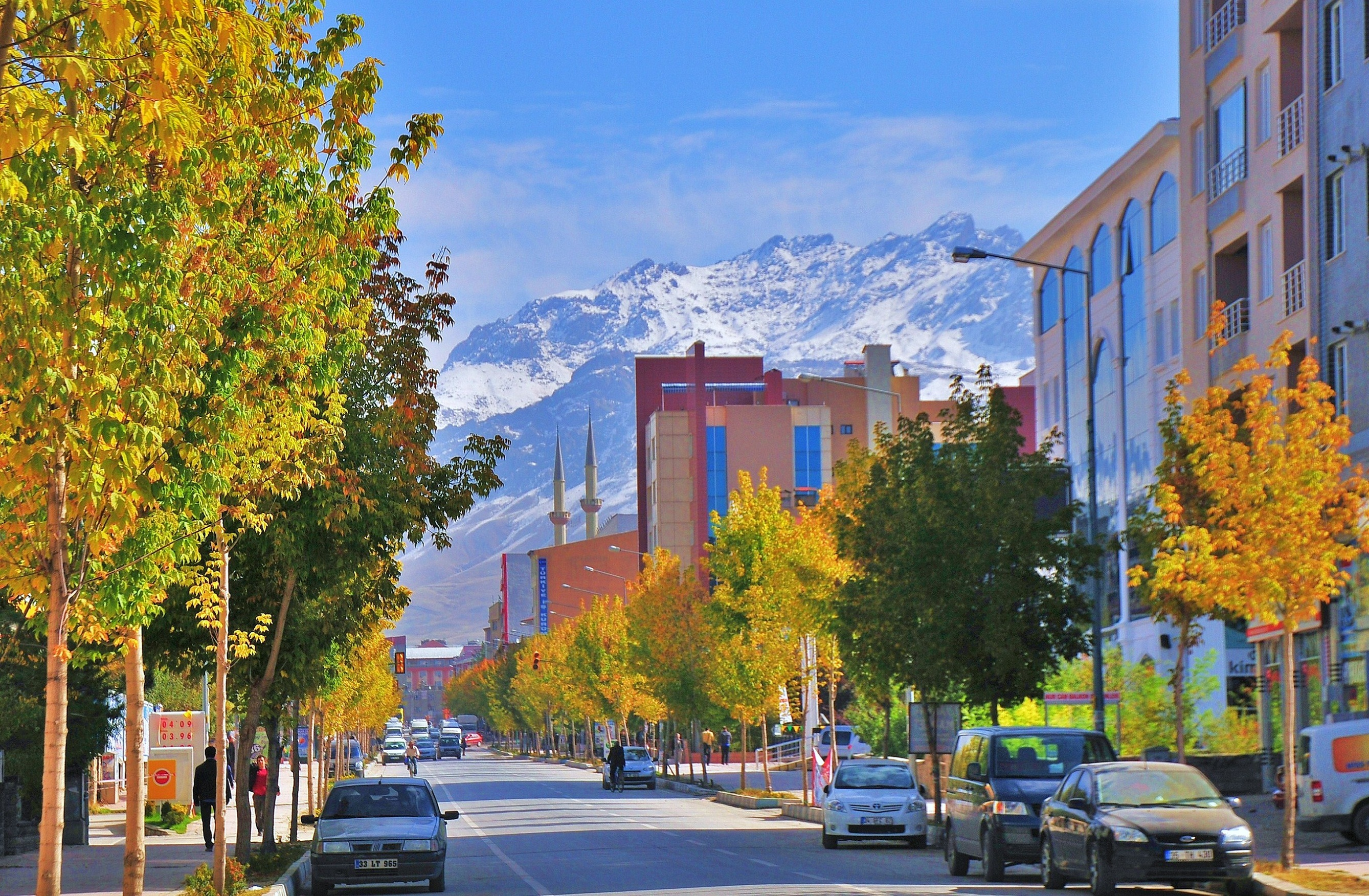
Streets of the city center

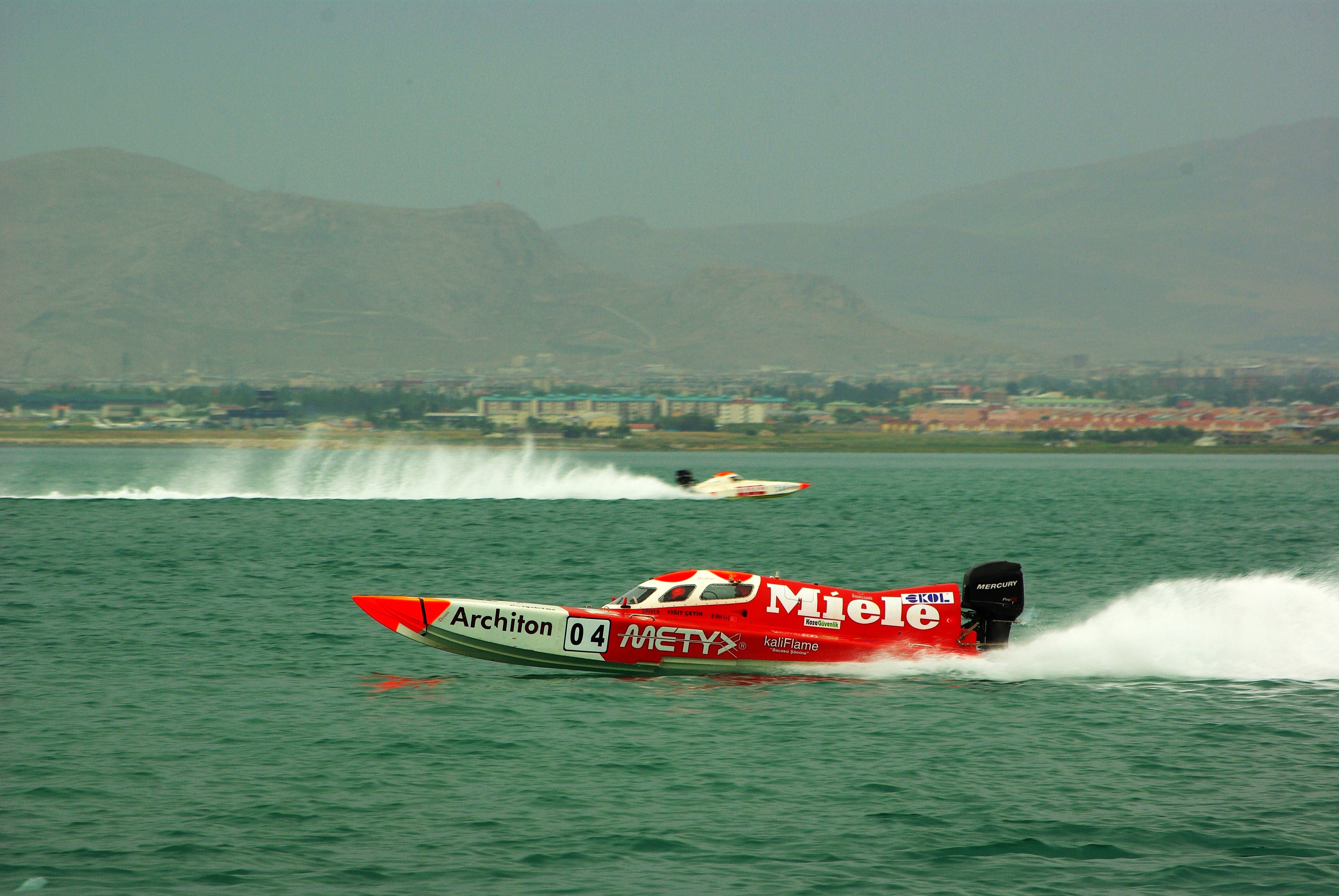
IOC Offshore Van Grand Prix 2010

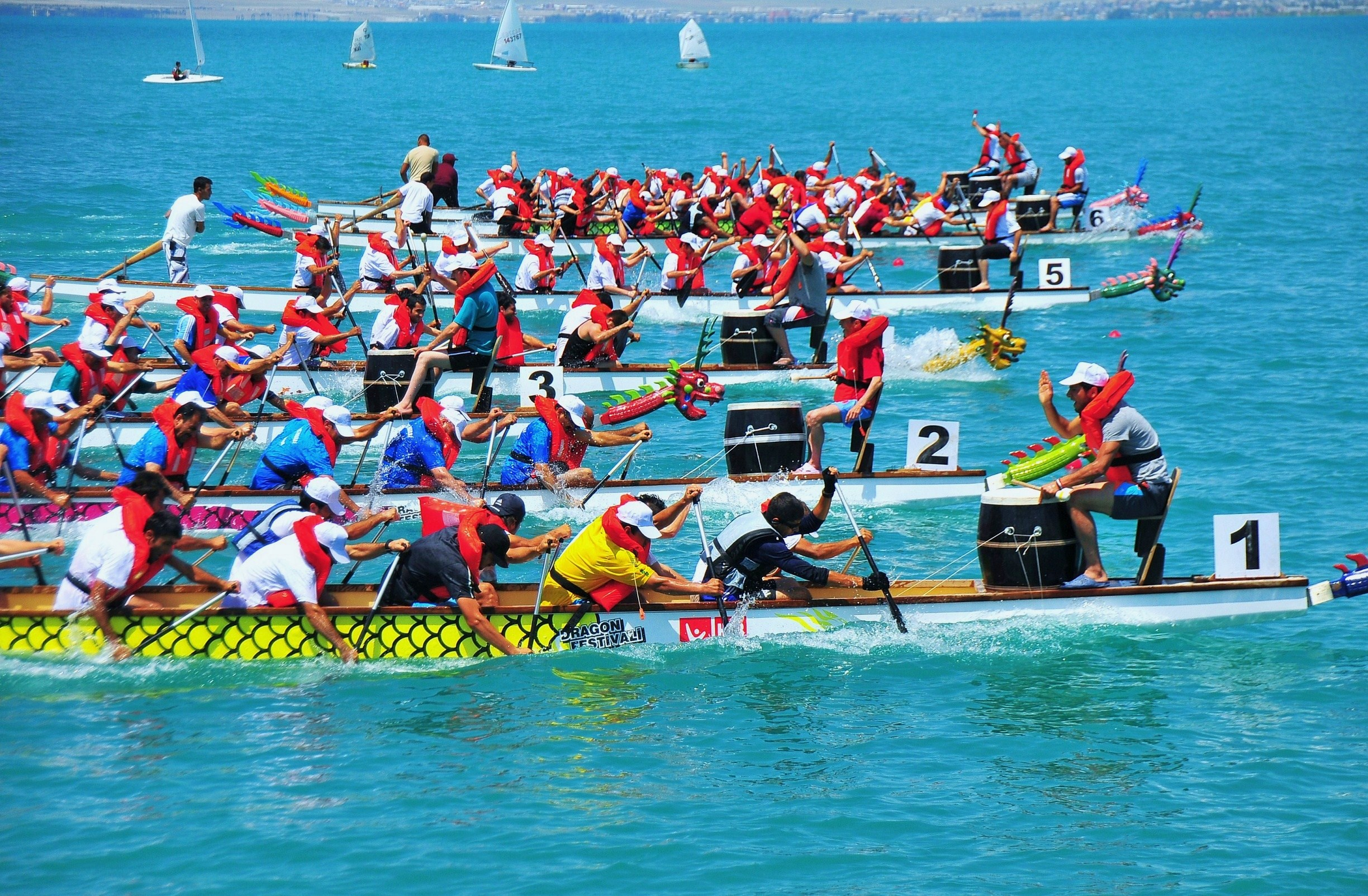
Festival of Van lake 2011

In the Treaty of Sèvres, the Entente Powers decided to cede the city to the First Republic of Armenia. Turkish revolutionaries, led by Mustafa Kemal Atatürk, rejected the terms of the treaty and instead waged the Turkish War of Independence. However, the idea of ceding Van to the Armenians was floated, and İsmet İnönü was said to have surveyed army officers on 14 October 1919 on the issue of ceding Van and Bitlis. However, the parliament in Ankara rejected any compromise on this issue. By 1920, Van fell under Turkish control again and its remaining Armenian inhabitants were expelled in a final round of ethnic cleansing. With the Treaty of Lausanne and Treaty of Kars, the Treaty of Sèvres was annulled and Van remained de facto under Turkish sovereignty.

By the end of the conflicts, the town of Van was empty and in ruins. The city was rebuilt after the war a few kilometers east of the ancient citadel, which is now known as Van Castle (Van Kalesi). The city now lies at about 1,750 metres (5,741 feet) above sea level.

== Tourism ==
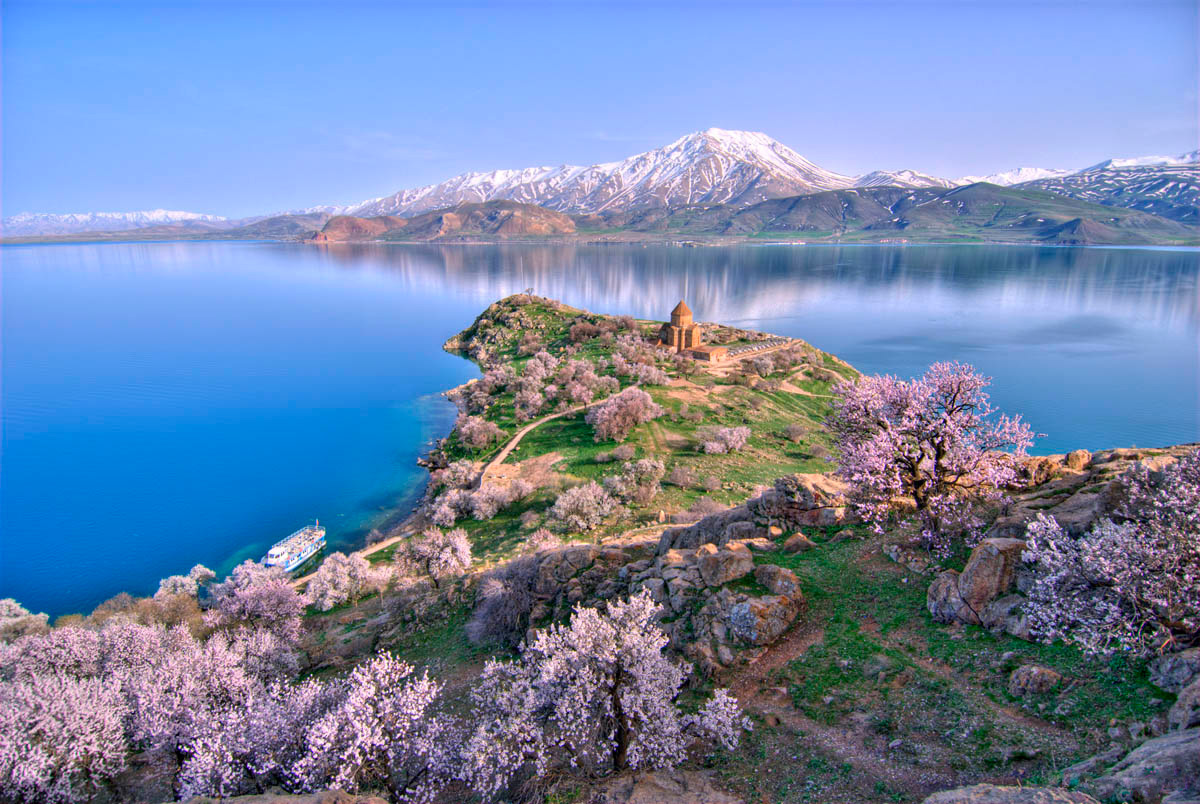
Lake Van

The main places with tourism potential in Van are Hoşap Castle, Muradiye Fall, Akdamar Island, Van Castle, Lake Turna, Lake Akgöl and Van Museum.

== Politics ==
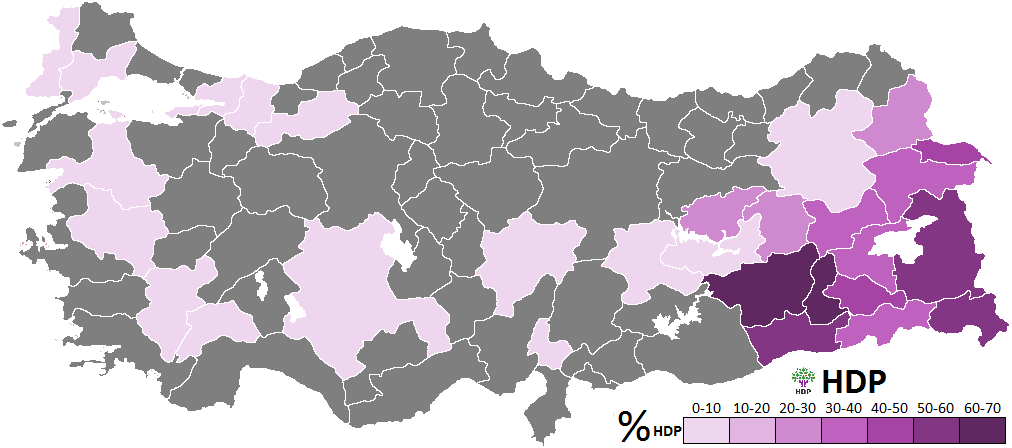
HDP won in a landslide in Van in the 2019 municipal elections.

In the 2019 municipal elections, Bedia Özgökçe Ertan of the HDP party was elected mayor of Van. In August 2019 she was dismissed and subsequently sentenced to 30 years imprisonment accused of supporting terrorism as part of a government crackdown against politicians of the Kurdish HDP party; the Turkish state appointed an unelected state-trustee, Mehmet Emin Bilmez, in her place. Many other Kurdish mayors in other Kurdish cities across the region also suffered a similar fate. Protests against the decision arose which were suppressed by the Turkish police with the use of water cannons; some protestors were killed.

== Demographics ==
At the end of 2024 the population figure for the city of Van was 522,885 (Ipekyolu, Tusba), but former Mayor Burhan Yengun is quoted as saying it may be as high as 600,000. The former Van Central (Merkez) District stretched over 1,938.14 km^{2}, but has subsequently been split into two new districts (İpekyolu and Tuşba). Today, Van has a Kurdish majority and Turkish minority. Scholars examining language use in the Van region have documented Kurmanji as the predominant spoken language among the city's Kurdish population. Sociolinguistic surveys of Kurdish-majority provinces, including Van, have found high rates of daily Kurdish language use among the Kurdish population, alongside varying degrees of Turkish bilingualism.

=== Language ===
Kurmanji (Northern Kurdish) is the principal language spoken by the Kurdish majority in Van. A sociolinguistic study of the Van community by Sherwani and Barlik (2020) documented Kurmanji as the predominant vernacular among the city's Kurdish residents, while Turkish functions as the language of public administration and formal education. Research on language demographics in Kurdish-majority southeastern Turkey has identified Van among the provinces with substantial Kurdish-speaking populations.

== Geography ==
The city of Van is located at the western foot of Mount Erek.

=== Climate ===
Van has a Mediterranean-influenced humid continental climate (Köppen: Dsa, Trewartha: Dc) with cold, snowy winters and very warm, dry summers. Precipitation can be observed for the majority of the year, with a slight peak during spring and autumn, and a brief dry summer from July to September.

Climate data for Van (1991–2020, extremes 1939–2023)
Month	Jan	Feb	Mar	Apr	May	Jun	Jul	Aug	Sep	Oct	Nov	Dec	Year
Record high °C (°F)	12.6 (54.7)	14.3 (57.7)	22.7 (72.9)	27.2 (81.0)	29.3 (84.7)	33.5 (92.3)	37.5 (99.5)	36.7 (98.1)	35.0 (95.0)	28.8 (83.8)	20.1 (68.2)	15.5 (59.9)	37.5 (99.5)
Mean daily maximum °C (°F)	2.9 (37.2)	3.5 (38.3)	7.5 (45.5)	13.2 (55.8)	18.6 (65.5)	24.3 (75.7)	28.3 (82.9)	28.8 (83.8)	24.4 (75.9)	17.8 (64.0)	10.3 (50.5)	5.2 (41.4)	15.4 (59.7)
Daily mean °C (°F)	−2.1 (28.2)	−1.2 (29.8)	2.9 (37.2)	8.4 (47.1)	13.4 (56.1)	18.8 (65.8)	22.7 (72.9)	22.9 (73.2)	18.4 (65.1)	12.1 (53.8)	5.2 (41.4)	0.2 (32.4)	10.1 (50.2)
Mean daily minimum °C (°F)	−6 (21)	−5.2 (22.6)	−1.2 (29.8)	3.6 (38.5)	8.0 (46.4)	12.3 (54.1)	16.0 (60.8)	16.2 (61.2)	12.0 (53.6)	6.8 (44.2)	0.9 (33.6)	−3.6 (25.5)	5.0 (41.0)
Record low °C (°F)	−28.7 (−19.7)	−28.2 (−18.8)	−22.7 (−8.9)	−13.1 (8.4)	−3.5 (25.7)	−2.6 (27.3)	3.6 (38.5)	5.0 (41.0)	−0.1 (31.8)	−14 (7)	−18.6 (−1.5)	−21.3 (−6.3)	−28.7 (−19.7)
Average precipitation mm (inches)	32.9 (1.30)	35.4 (1.39)	49.0 (1.93)	57.2 (2.25)	45.8 (1.80)	16.6 (0.65)	7.9 (0.31)	5.6 (0.22)	19.9 (0.78)	45.9 (1.81)	48.8 (1.92)	45.2 (1.78)	410.2 (16.15)
Average precipitation days	9.83	10.7	12.57	12.43	12	5.23	2.37	1.3	2.6	8.07	8.7	10.53	95.8
Average snowy days	11.67	10.88	9.13	1.58	0.08	0	0	0	0	0.17	2.75	10	46.26
Average relative humidity (%)	67.4	68.2	66.1	60.2	55.9	47.6	42.9	40.9	44.3	57.4	64.5	68.0	56.9
Mean monthly sunshine hours	155.0	161.0	201.5	231.0	294.5	351.0	372.0	347.2	306.0	232.5	177.0	127.1	2,955.8
Mean daily sunshine hours	5.0	5.7	6.5	7.7	9.5	11.7	12.0	11.2	10.2	7.5	5.9	4.1	8.1
Source 1: Turkish State Meteorological Service
Source 2: NOAA (humidity, 1991–2020), Meteomanz

=== Landmarks ===
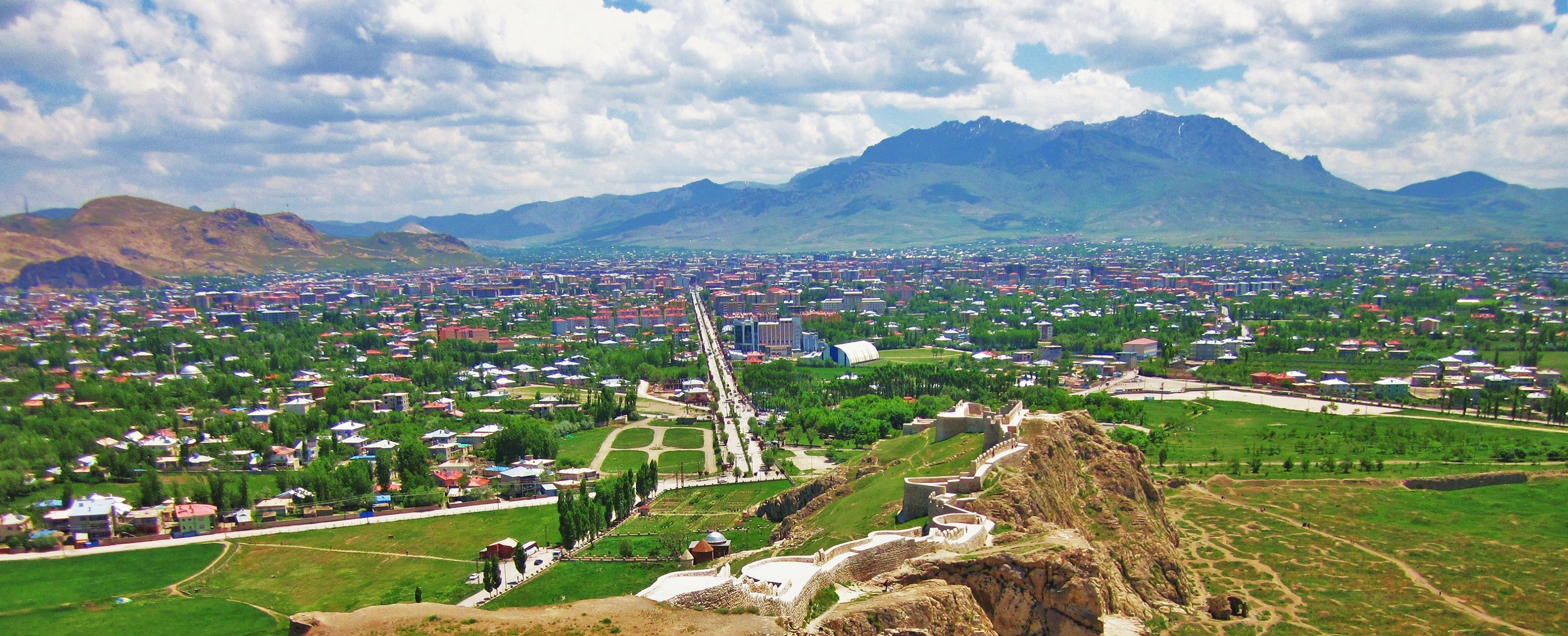
View of the city from Van Castle

The modern city is located on the plain extending from the Lake Van, at a distance of 5 kilometres (3 miles) from the lake shore. Reports have appeared over the years of a certain Lake Van Monster said to live in the lake. Lake Erçek is the second largest lake in the region and lies just east of Lake Van.

Van has often been called "The Pearl of the East" because of the beauty of its surrounding landscape. An old Armenian proverb in the same sense is "Van in this world, paradise in the next". This phrase has been slightly modified in Turkish as Dünyada Van, ahirette iman or "Van for this world, faith for the next".

The city is home to Van Yüzüncü Yıl Üniversitesi (Van 100th Year University) and recently came to the headlines for two highly publicized investigations initiated by the Prosecutor of Van, one of which was focused on accusations against the university's rector, Hasan Ceylan, who was kept in custody for a time. He was finally acquitted but lost his rectorate. He is a grandson of Agop Vartovyan, an Ottoman Armenian who is accepted as the founder of modern Turkish theatre. Hasan Ceylan is also the department chairman of Environmental Engineering at Van Yüzüncü Yıl University.

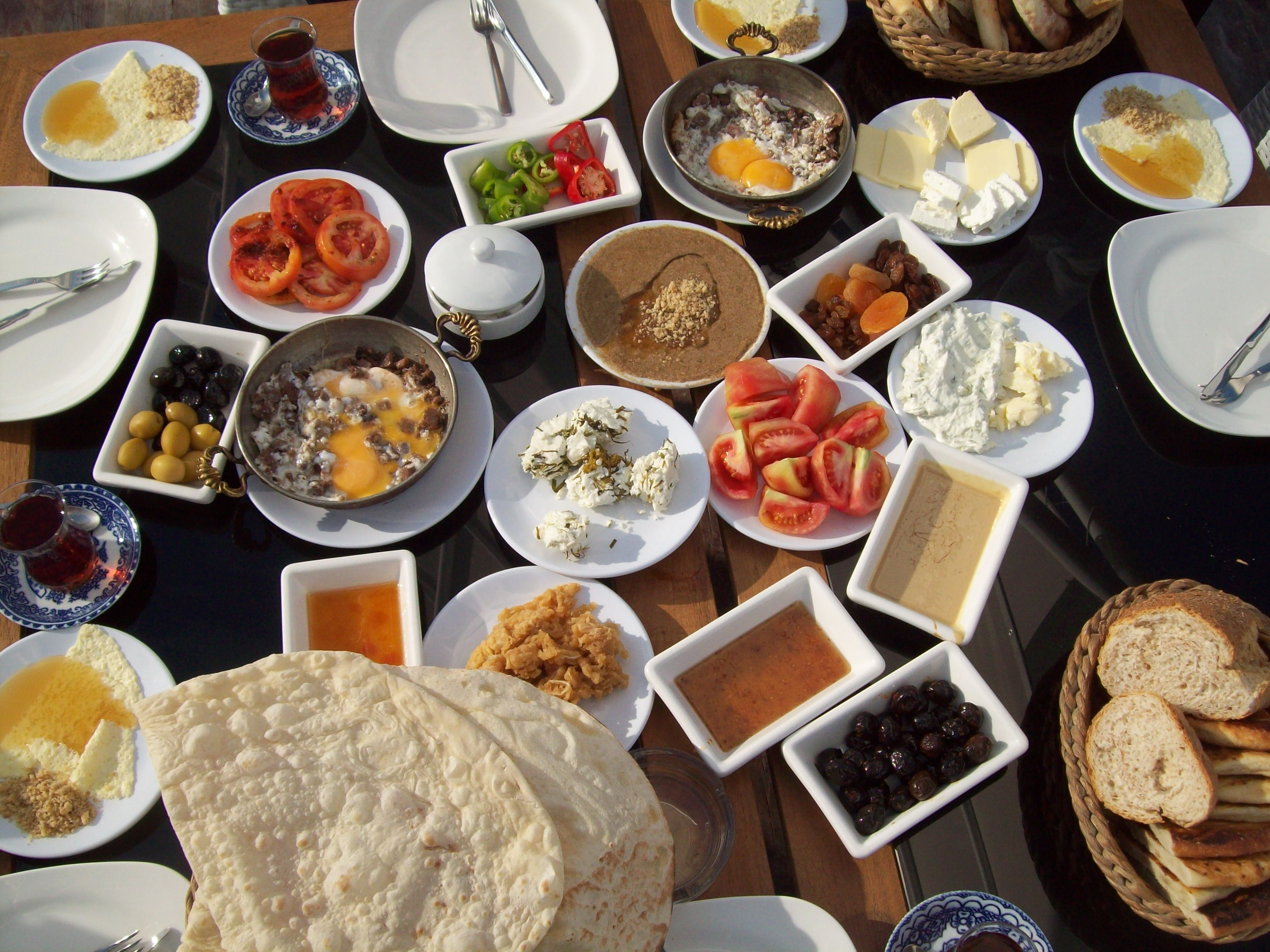
Famous breakfast table in Van

=== Earthquakes ===
In 1941, Van suffered a destructive 5.9 M_{w} earthquake. A more severe 7.2 M_{w} earthquake occurred on 23 October 2011. On the 9 November 2011, another earthquake caused several buildings to collapse.

== Cuisine ==
In culinary terms, as some cities in Turkey became renowned for their kebab culture or other types of traditional local dishes, Van has distinguished itself with its breakfast culture.

== Transport ==
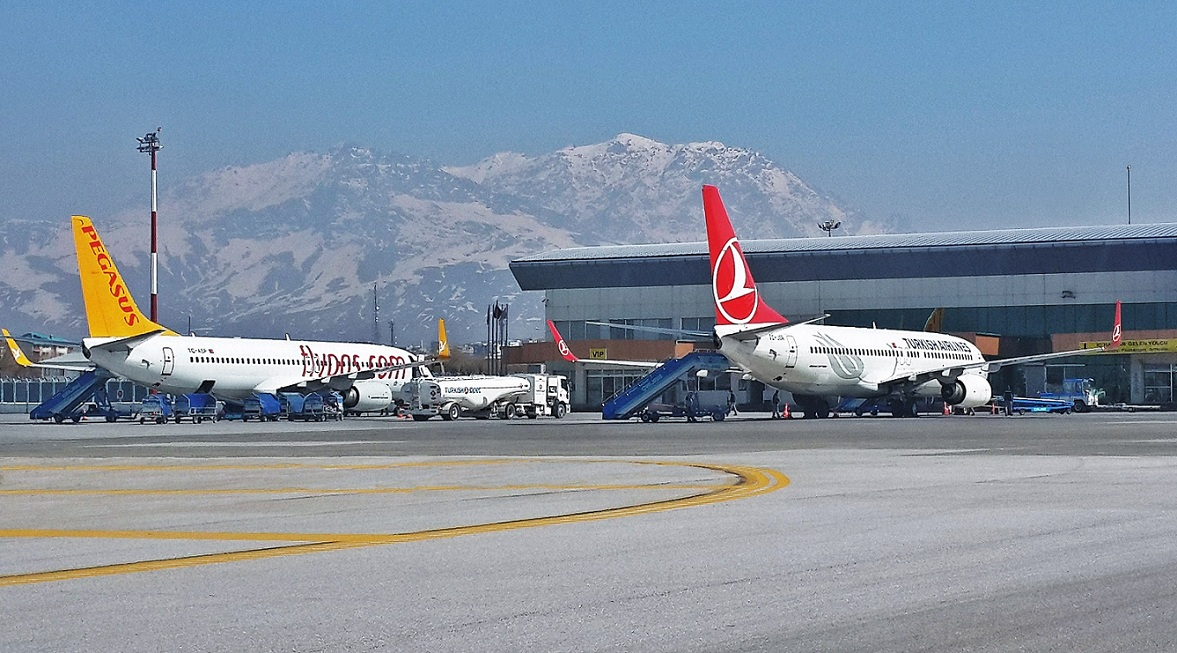
Van Ferit Melen Airport

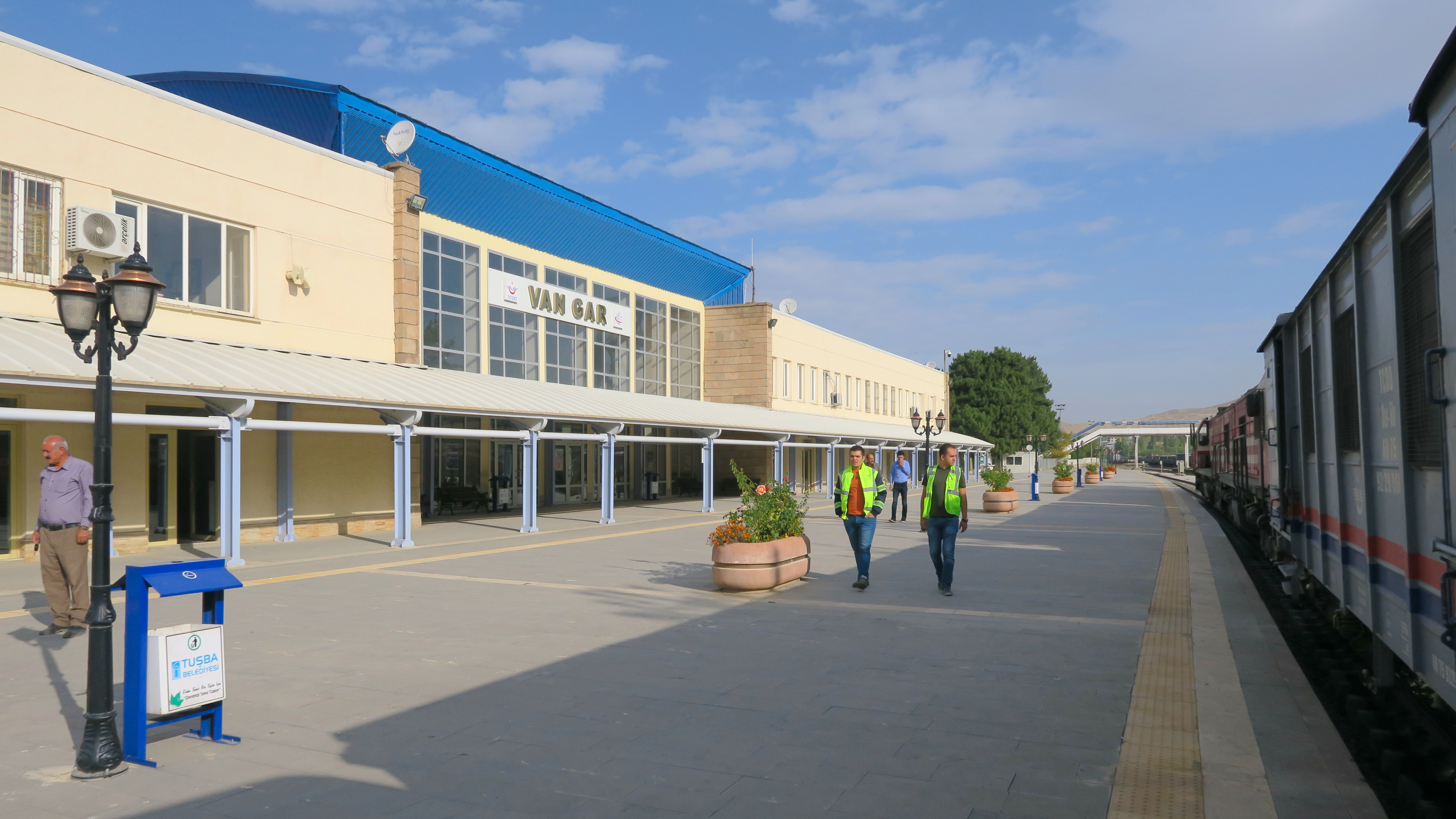
Van Railway Station

Van stands on Highway D300, which runs from the Iranian border 100 km east at Kapikoy through Van then along the south lake shore to Tatvan (100 km), and westwards to the rest of Turkey. Highway D975 runs north to Dogubeyazit and south towards Hakkari. Frequent buses and dolmuses ply these highways.

Van is the western terminus of the railway line from Iran, with freight and passenger trains (suspended between 2015 and 2018). There is a train ferry (upgraded in 2015) across the lake to Tatvan. There is no railway around the lake; it is intended eventually to build one but to date there are no plans. This would actually create an unbroken rail link between Europe and the Indian subcontinent, as Tatvan is the terminus of the line to Ankara and Istanbul.

Van has daily flights to Istanbul, Ankara and other major Turkish cities from Ferit Melen Airport.

== Media ==
Near Van, there is a longwave broadcasting station with a 250-metre-tall (820-foot) guyed mast. It went in service in 1990 and operates on 225 kHz with 600 kW. It has also local news outlets like Van Gazetesi or Gazete Van.

== Notable people ==
- Hanımzer Melet (born 1993), national team wheelchair basketball player.
- Vardan Ajemian (born 1905), Van born, Armenian theatrical director and actor. He was named People's Artist of USSR in 1965 and Hero of Socialist Labour in 1975.

== Van cat ==
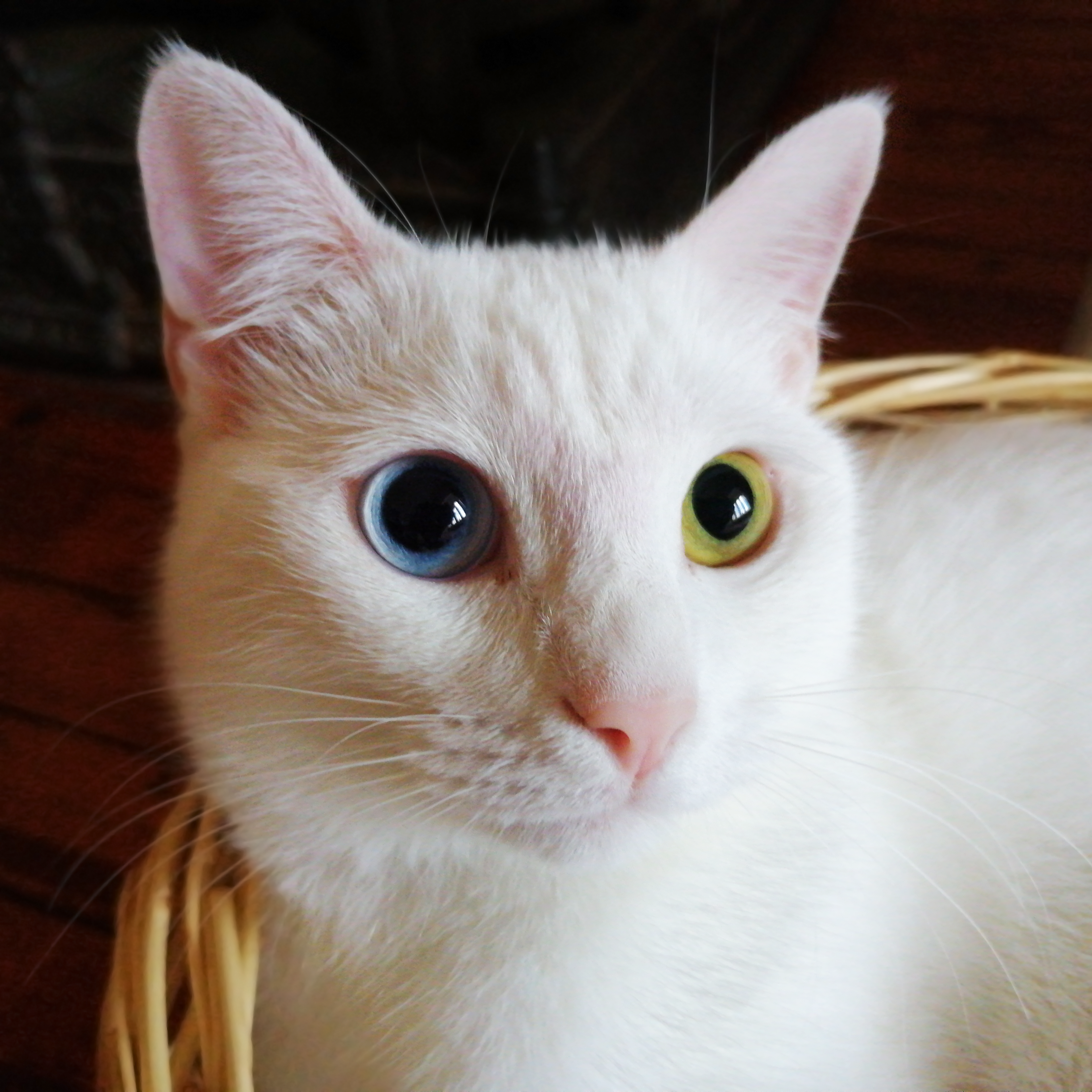
Van cat

The Van cat is a breed of cat native to this town and named after it. It is noted for its white fur, and for having differently colored eyes.

== Twin towns – Sister cities ==
Van is twinned with:

- Bursa, Turkey
- Odessa, Ukraine
- Karlsruhe, Germany

== Gallery ==
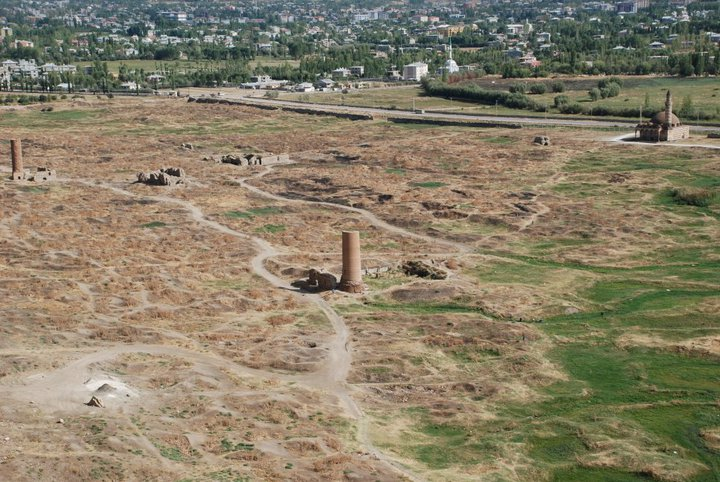
Former Town of Van in 2009

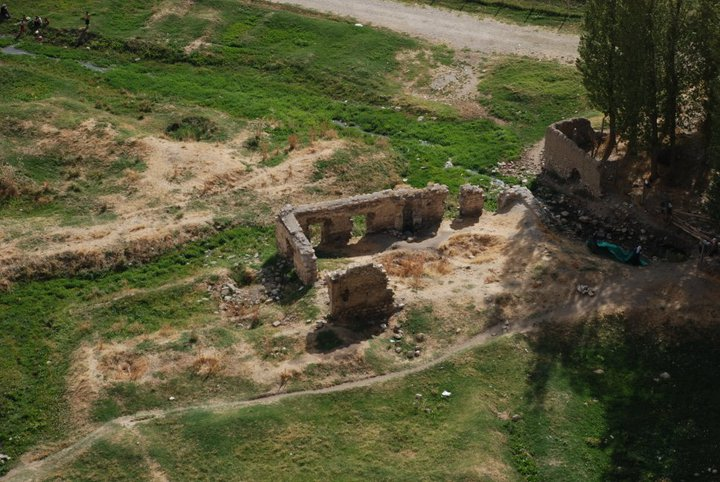
Former Town of Van in 2009

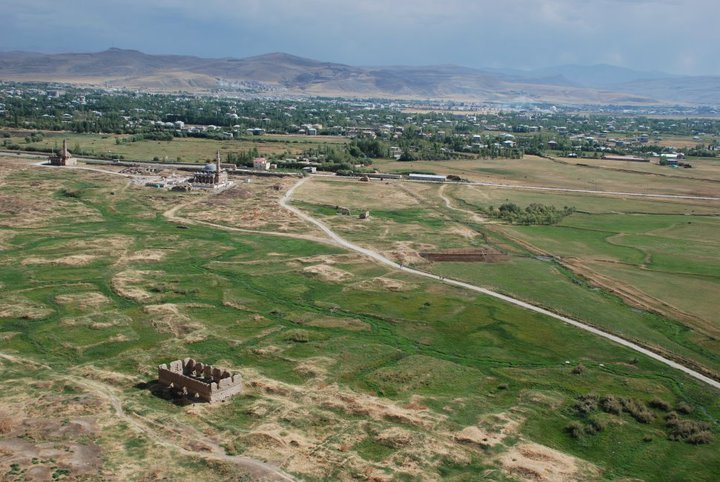
Former Town of Van in 2009

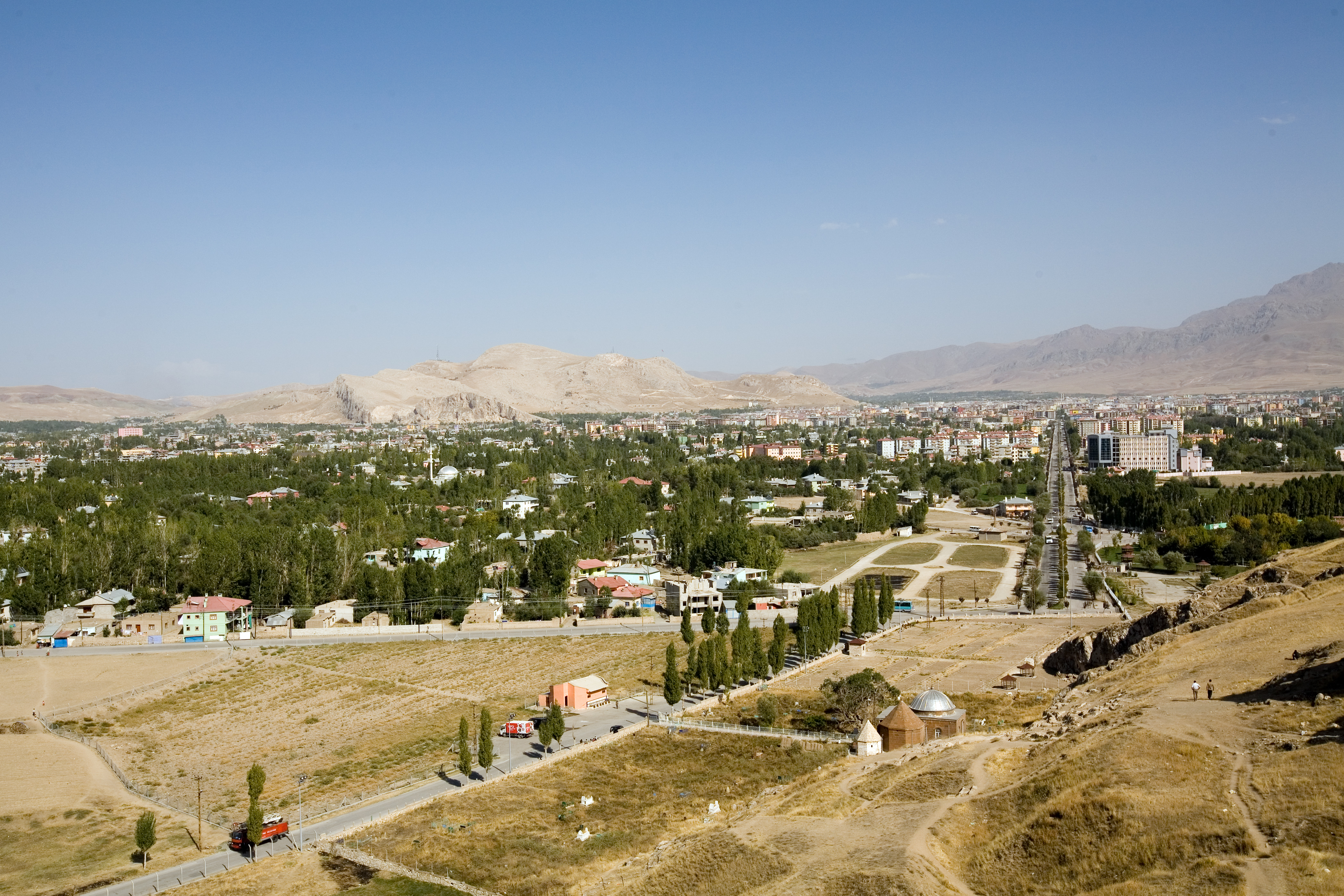
View of Van from the Van Castle

Van, Turkey - July 4, 2026

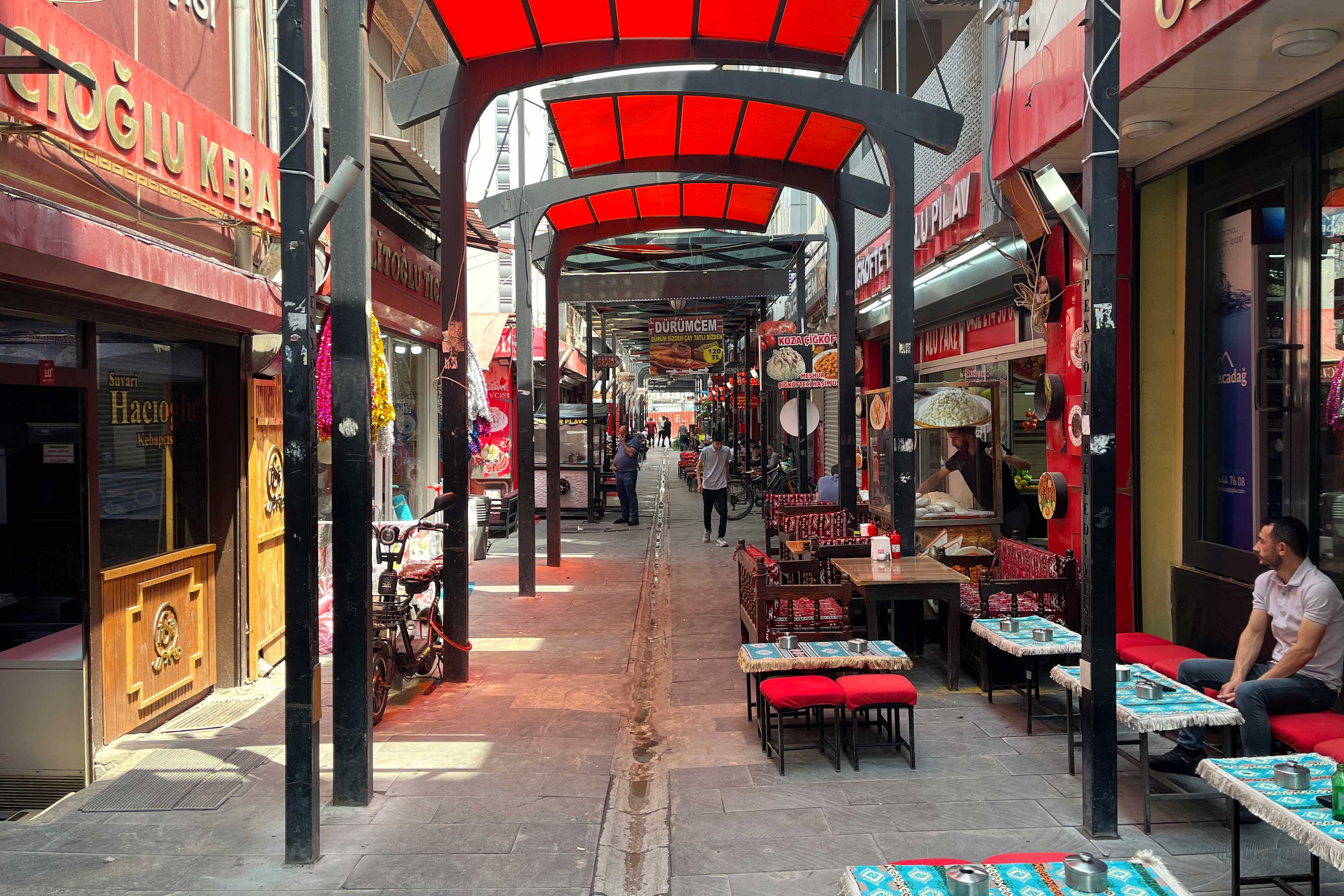
Van, Turkey - July 4, 2026

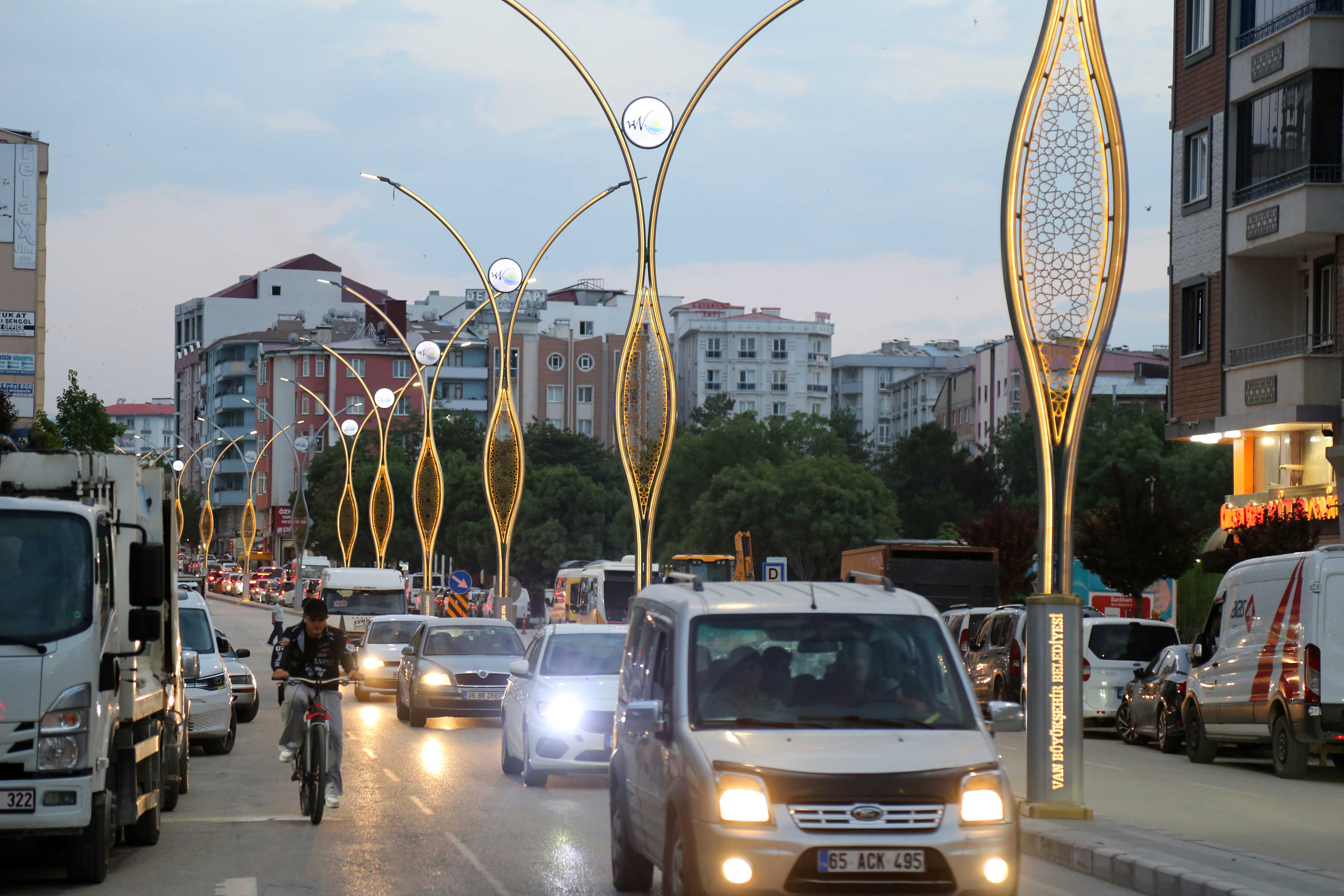
Van, Turkey - July 4, 2026

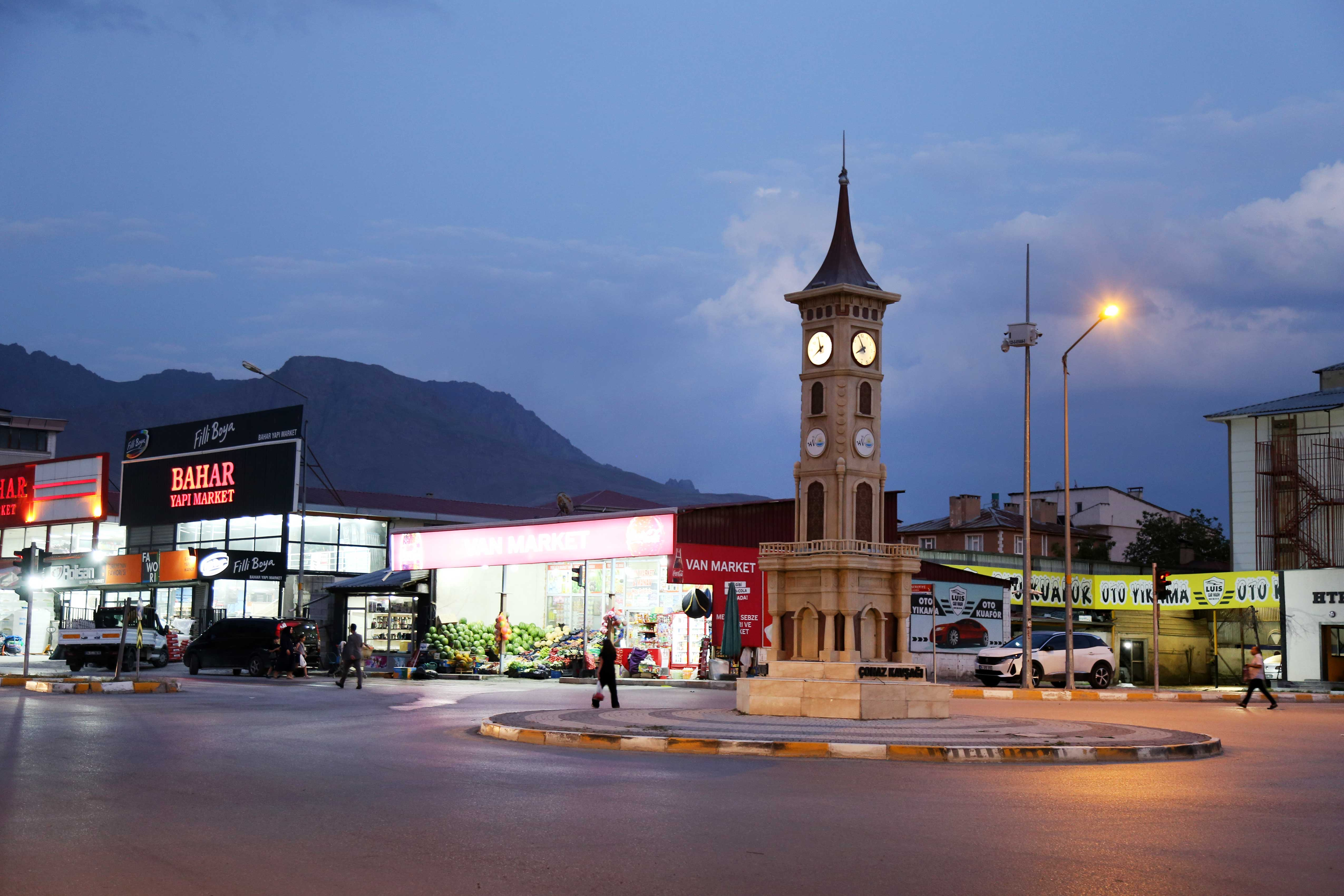
Van, Turkey - July 4, 2026

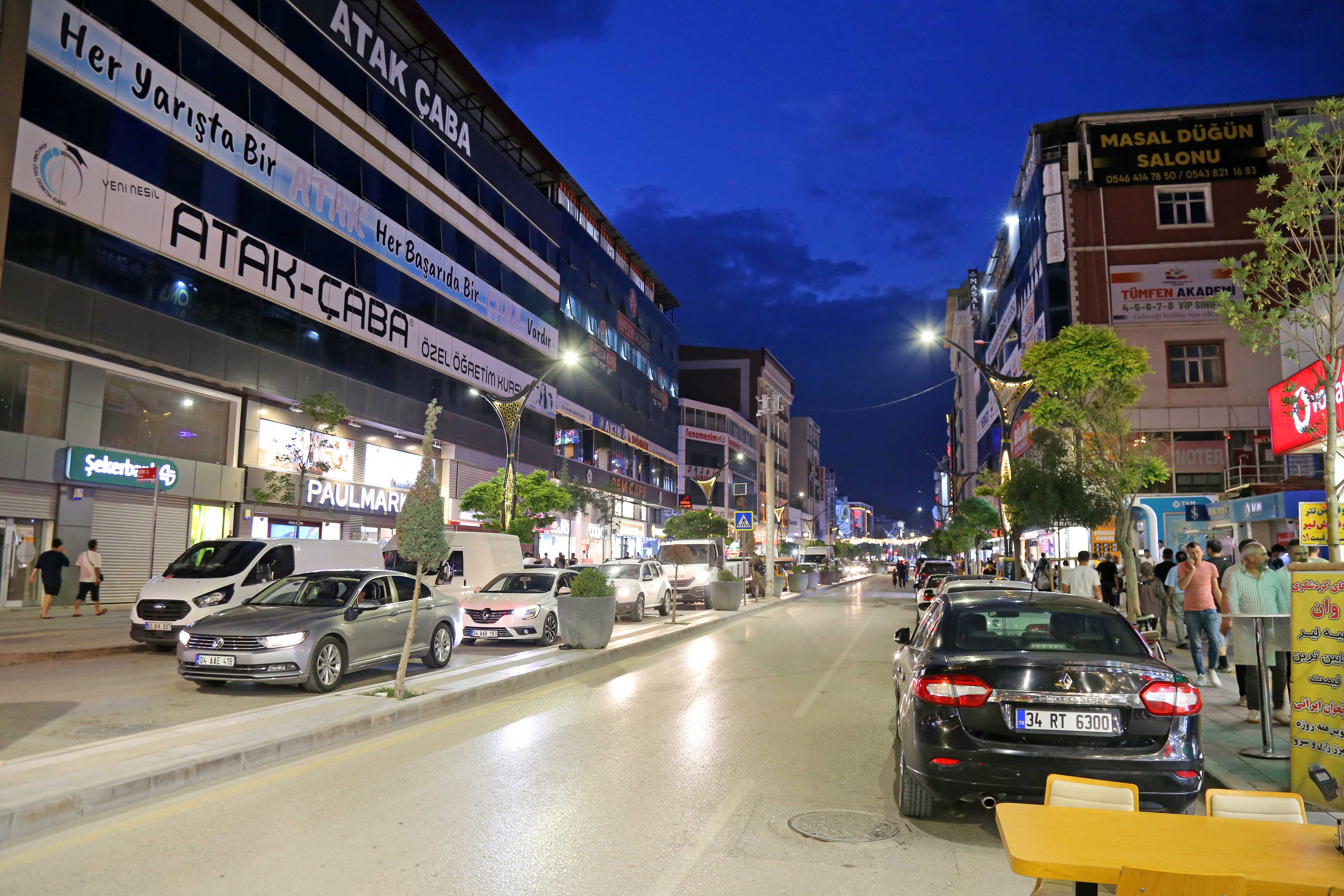
Van, Turkey - July 4, 2026

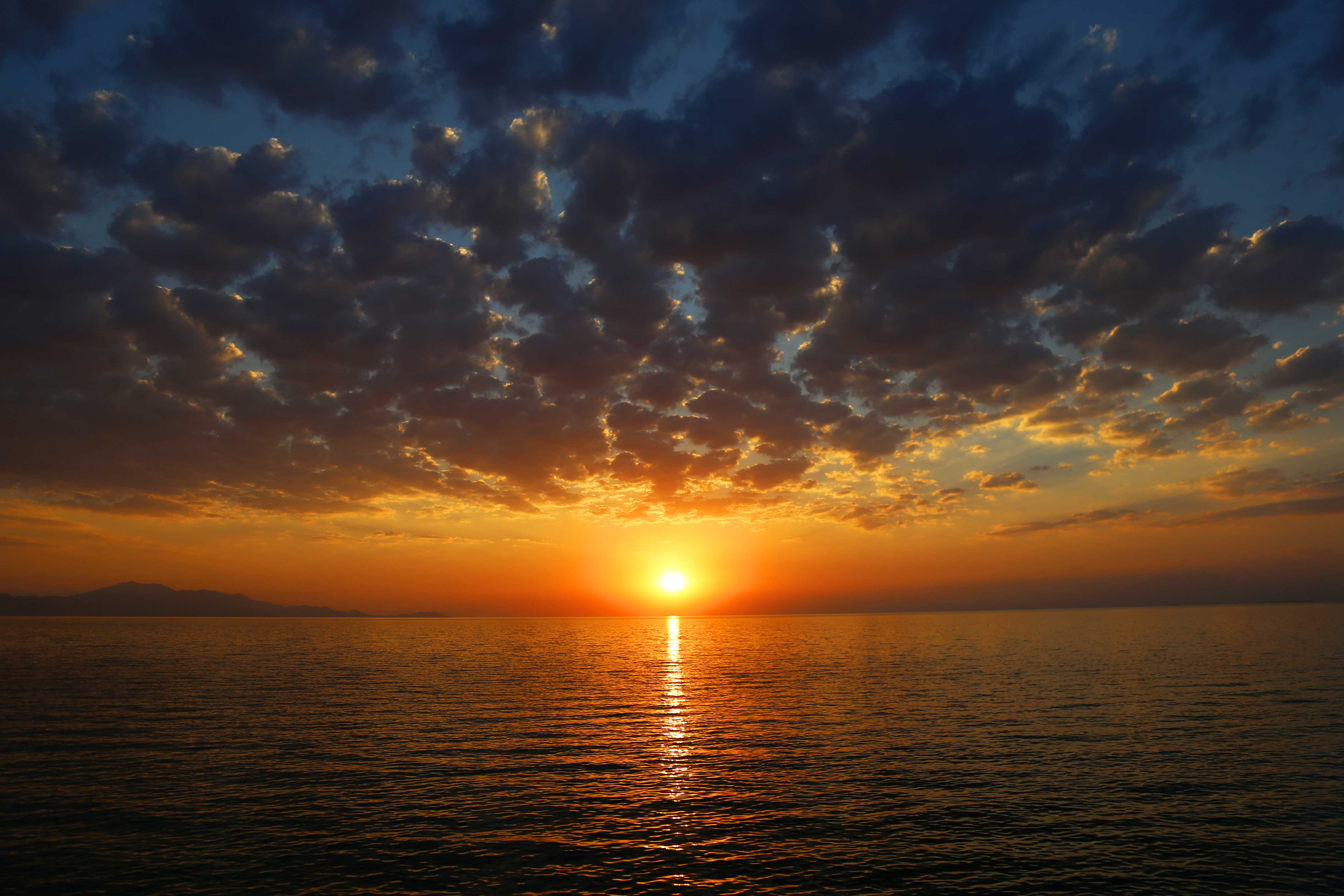
Lake Van (Van Gölü), Turkey - July 3, 2026

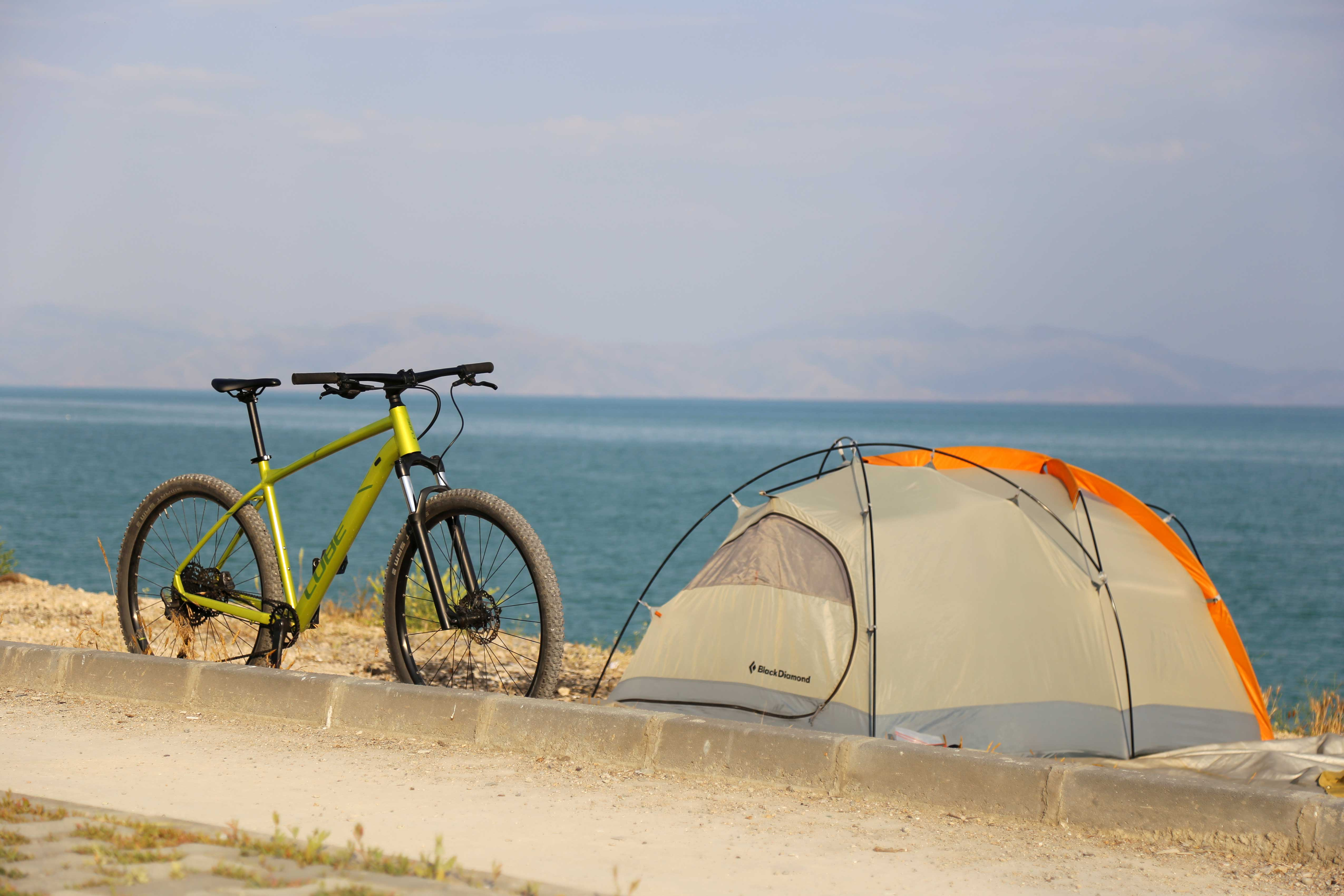
Lake Van (Van Gölü), Turkey - July 4, 2026

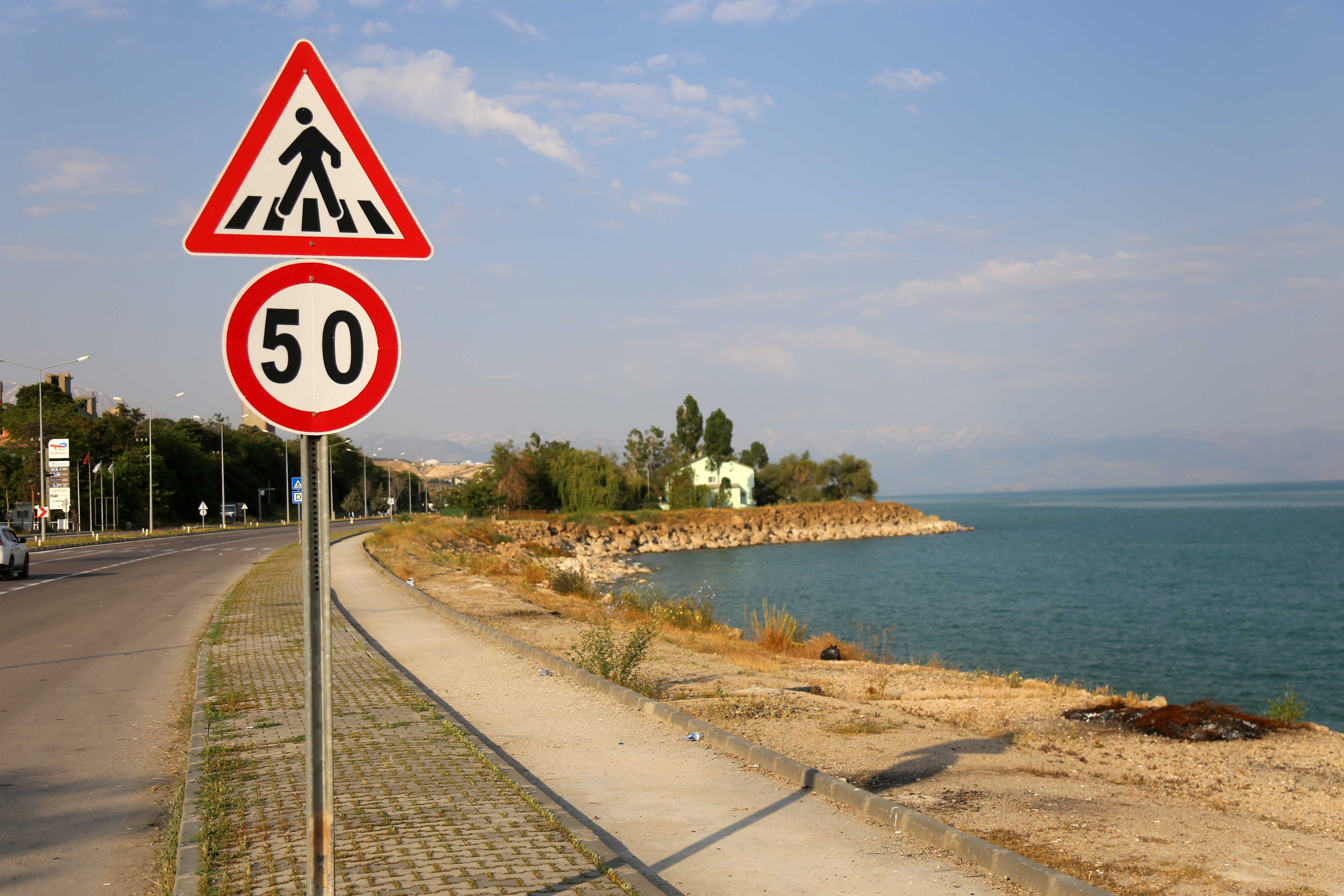
Lake Van (Van Gölü), Turkey - July 4, 2026

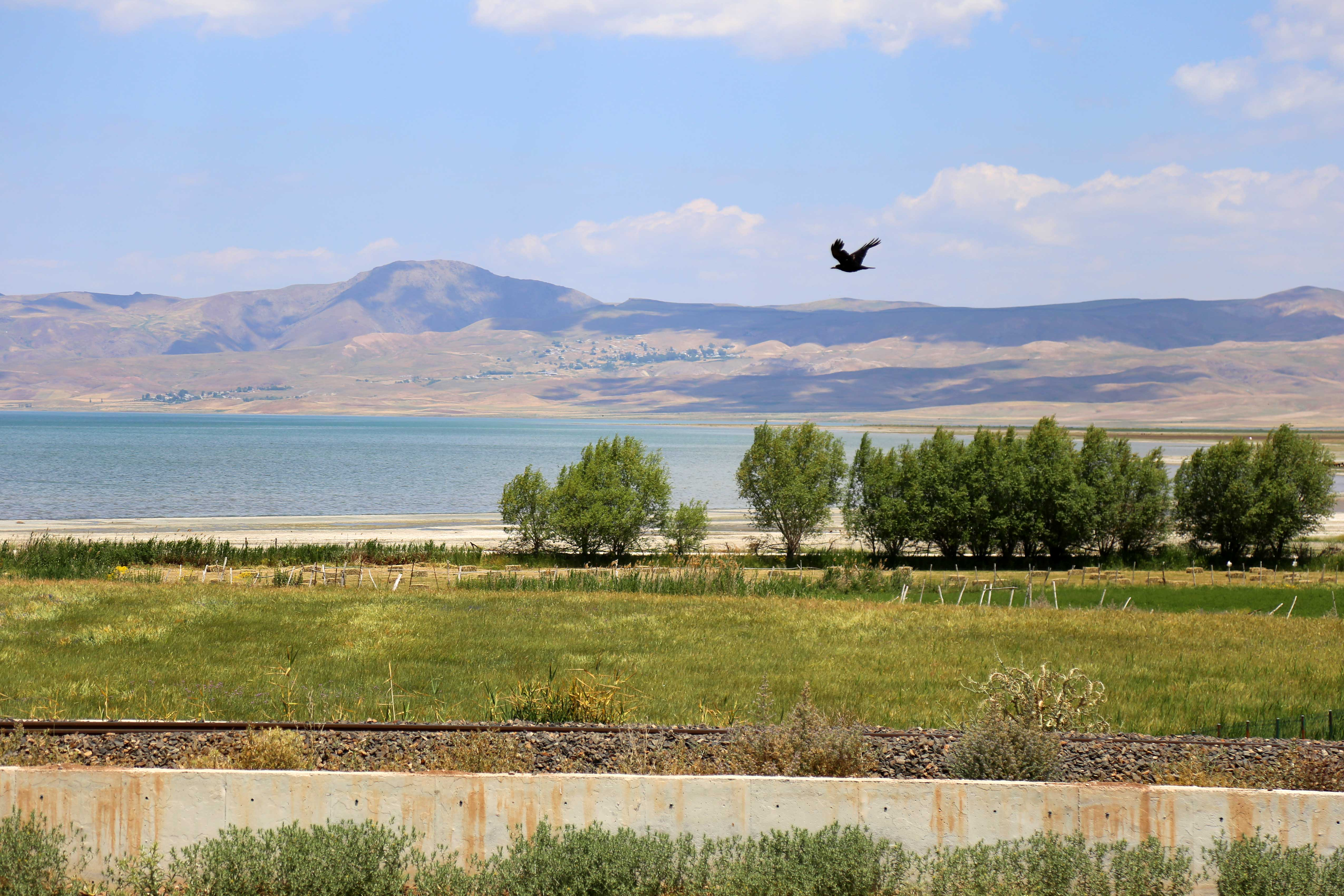
Lake Erçek (Erçek Gölü), Turkey - July 3, 2026

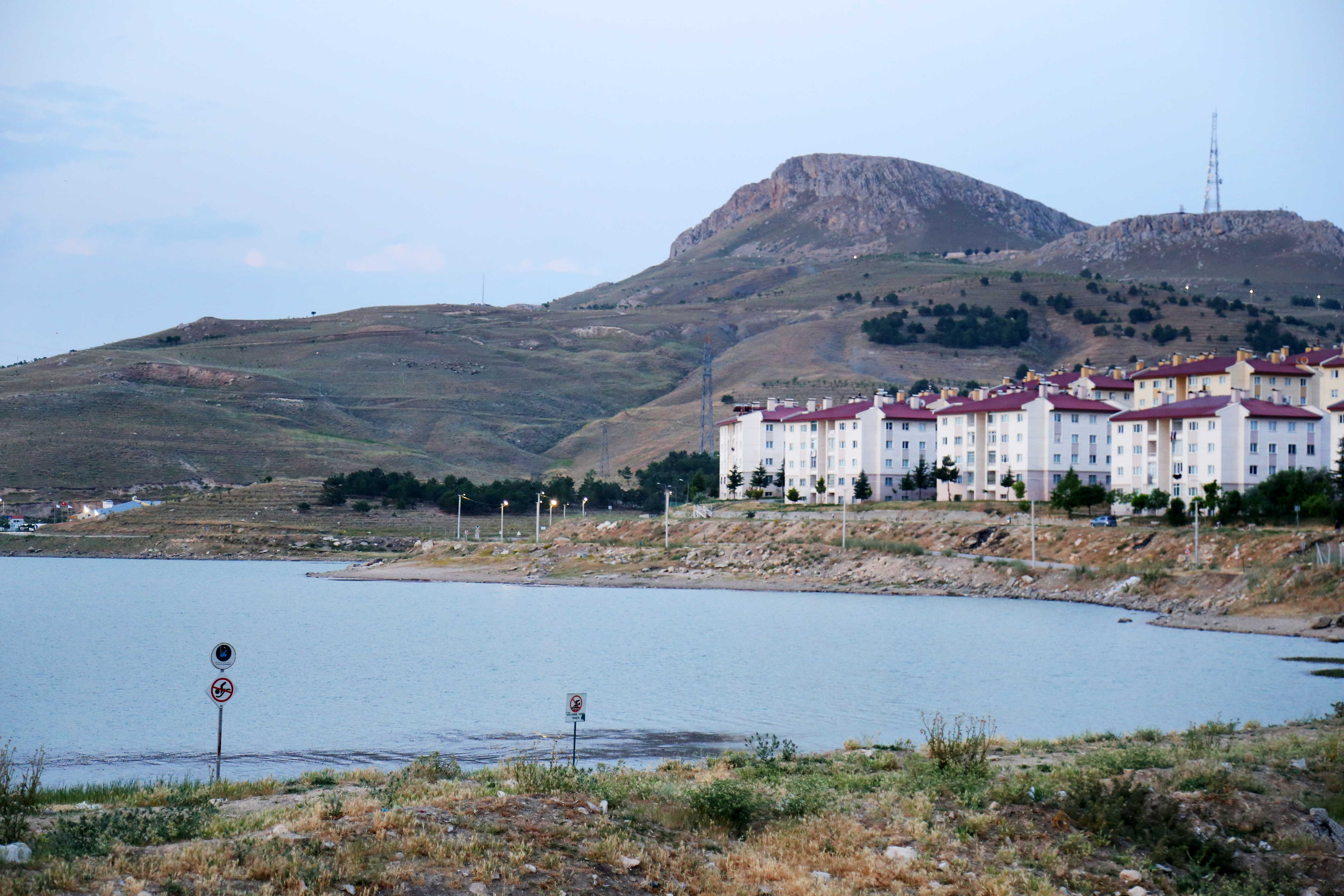
Pond Bostaniçi (Bostaniçi Göleti), Van, Turkey - July 5, 2026

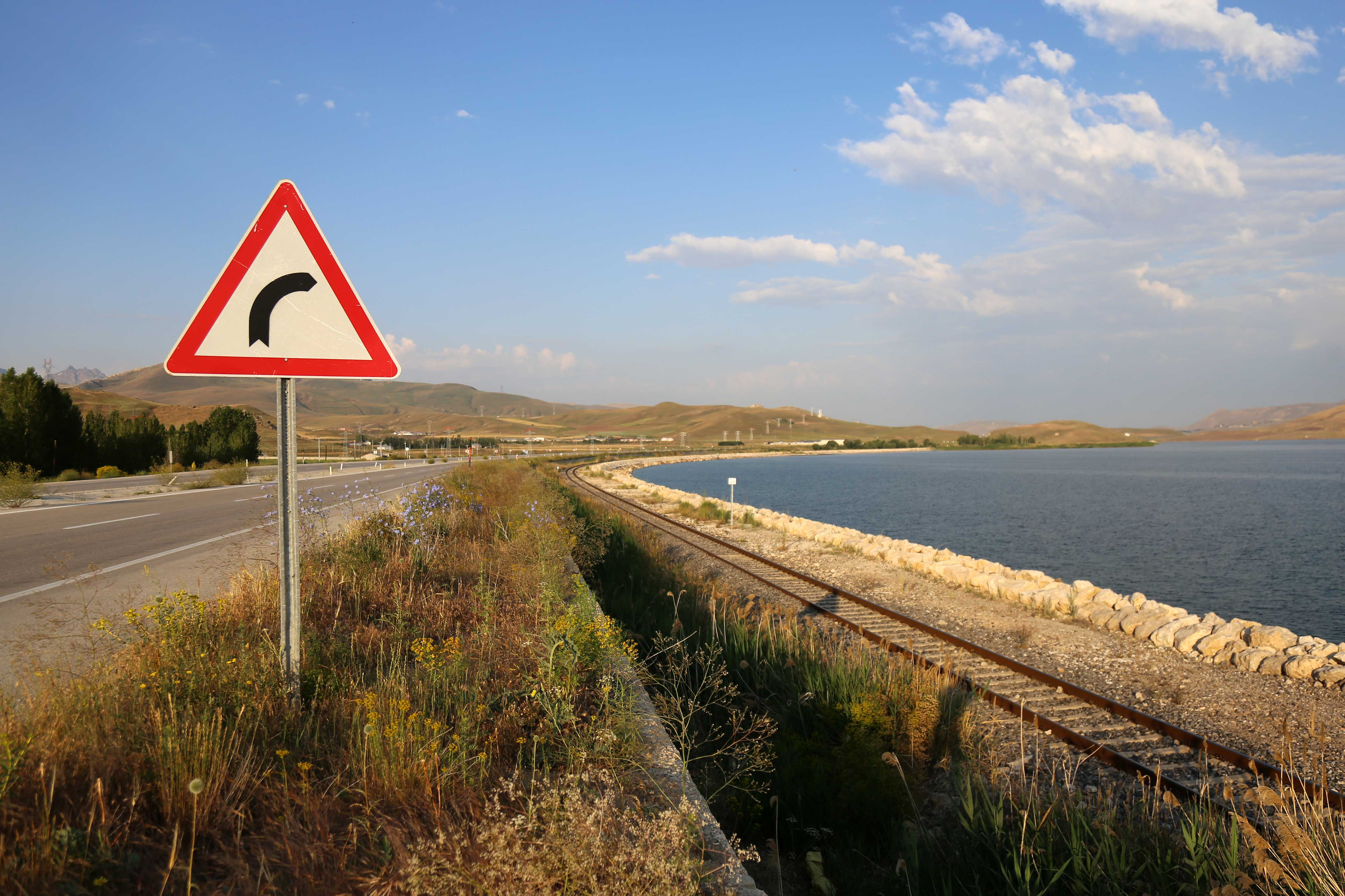
Lake Erçek (Erçek Gölü), Turkey - July 3, 2026

== See also ==
- Defense of Van (1915)
- Vaspurakan
- Tuşpa
- İpekyolu
- Van Museum

== Bibliography ==
- Hovannisian, Richard G., ed. (2000). Armenian Van/Vaspurakan. Historic Armenian Cities and Provinces. Costa Mesa, California: Mazda Publishers.
