= List of new districts of Turkey =

According to Law act no 6360, new districts are to be established in Turkey by the local elections in 2014. Some of the new districts will replace the present central districts of provinces and a few will be new establishments. The following list shows the new districts.

Province	Location	Abolished district	New district
Aydın Province	Aydın Central District	Aydın	Efeler
Balıkesir Province	a part of Balıkesir Central District	Balıkesir	Karesi
Balıkesir Province	a part of Balıkesir Central District	Balıkesir	Altıeylül
Denizli Province	most of Denizli Central District	Denizli	Merkezefendi
Denizli Province	Akköy district and a part of Denizli Central District	Akköy	Pamukkale
Hatay Province	a part of Hatay Central District	(none)	Defne
Hatay Province	a part of Dörtyol District	(none)	Payas (Note: Now a Subdistrict)
Malatya Province	Malatya Central District	Malatya	(Note: Malatya Central District is split into two existing neighbouring districts.)
Manisa Province	a part of Manisa Central District	Manisa	Şehzadeler
Manisa Province	a part of Manisa Central District	Manisa	Yunusemre
Kahramanmaraş Province	a part of Kahramanmaraş Central District	Kahramanmaraş	Dulkadiroğlu
Kahramanmaraş Province	a part of Kahramanmaraş Central District	Kahramanmaraş	Onikişubat
Mardin Province	Mardin Central District	Mardin	Artuklu
Muğla Province	Muğla Central District	Muğla	Menteşe
Muğla Province	a part of Fethiye District	(none)	Seydikemer
Ordu Province	Ordu Central District	Ordu	Altınordu
Tekirdağ Province	Tekirdağ Central District	Tekirdağ	Süleymanpaşa
Tekirdağ Province	a part of Çerkezköy District	(none)	Kapaklı
Tekirdağ Province	a part of Çorlu District	(none)	Ergene
Trabzon Province	Trabzon Central District	Trabzon	Ortahisar
Şanlıurfa Province	a part of Şanlıurfa Central District	Şanlıurfa	Eyyübiye
Şanlıurfa Province	a part of Şanlıurfa Central District	Şanlıurfa	Haliliye
Şanlıurfa Province	a part of Şanlıurfa Central District	Şanlıurfa	Karaköprü
Van Province	a part of Van Central District	Van	Tuşpa
Van Province	a part of Van Central District	Van	İpekyolu
