= Bostaniçi =

Town in Van province, Turkey

- Neighbourhood
- Location in Turkey
- Coordinates: 38°30′26″N 43°26′08″E
- Country: Turkey
- Province: Van
- District: İpekyolu
- Population (2022): 31,714
- Time zone: UTC+3 (TRT)

Bostaniçi is a neighbourhood of the municipality and district of İpekyolu, Van Province, Turkey. Its population is 31,714 (2022). Before the 2013 reorganisation, it was a town (belde) in the central district of Van Province.

It lies within the metropolitan area of the city of Van. The Armenian name of the town was Sghka. Bostaniçi is located at the foot of Mount Erek (Erek Dağı), the highest mountain of Van.
