= Lake Gövelek =

Lake in Turkey

- Location within Turkey
- Location: Gövelek, İpekyolu, Van Province
- Coordinates: 38.5514°N 43.6205°E
- Basin countries: Turkey
- Surface elevation: 2.237 m (7 ft 4.1 in)

Lake Gövelek (Turkish: Gövelek Gölü); is a lake in İpekyolu district of Van province. It is located in the south of Erçek Lake and close to Van city center.

== History ==
The ruins of the city of Urartu stand on a high rocky hill 1.5 kilometers southeast of the Gövelek dam.
