= Lake Turna =

Lake in Turkey

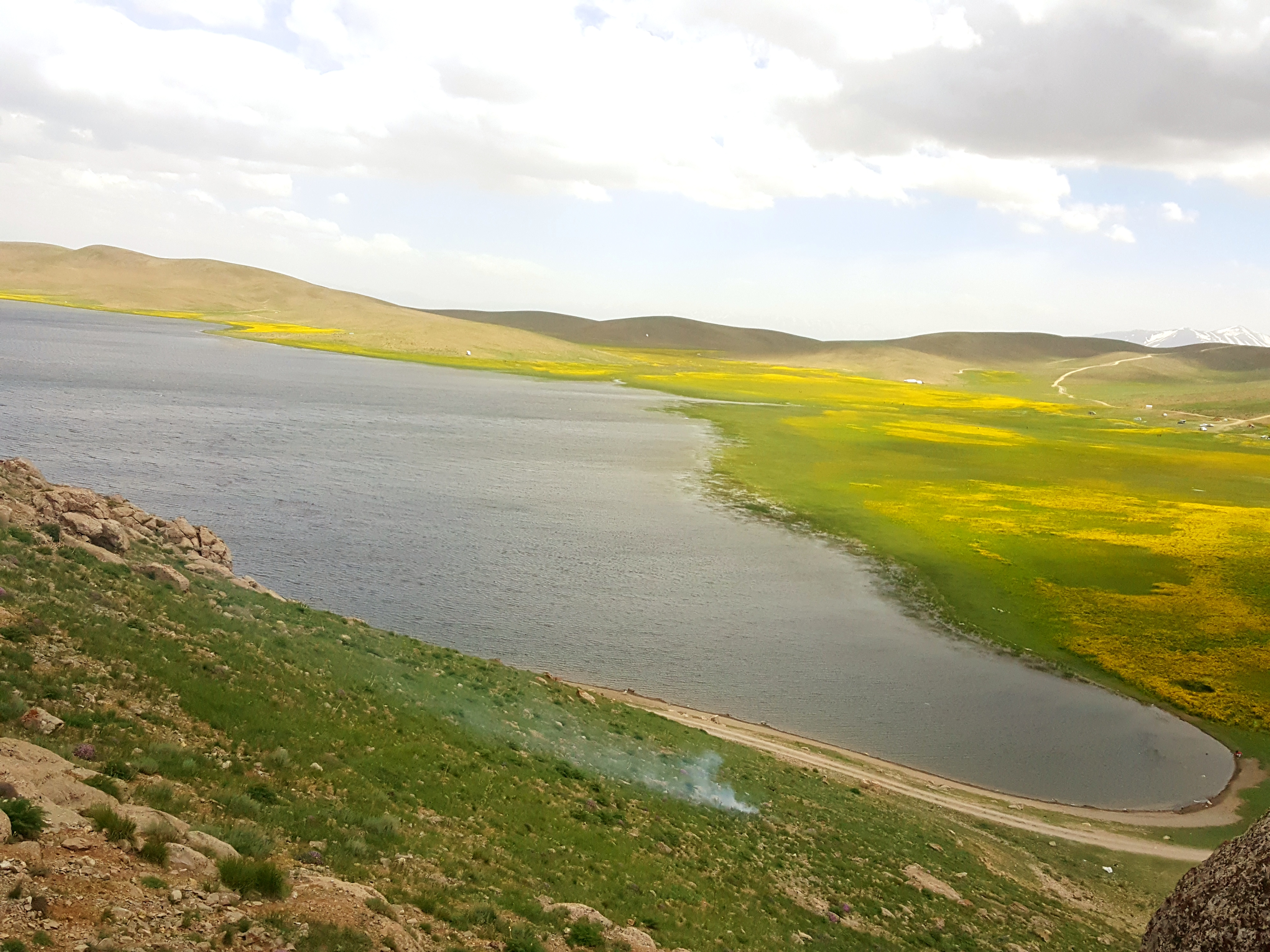

- Location within Turkey
- Location: İpekyolu, Van Province
- Coordinates: 38.46929°N 43.6055°E
- Lake type: Reservoir
- Basin countries: Turkey
- Surface area: 7 square kilometres (2.7 sq mi)
- Surface elevation: 2.547 m (8 ft 4.3 in)

Lake Turna (Turkish: Turna Gölü) is an artificial lake in the İpekyolu district of Van province. It is located at the eastern foot of Erek mountain.

== History ==
The lake was constructed by the Urartians during the reign of king Rusa II (685-645 BC). For that, a small river was blocked with two dams to create the reservoir which served to ensure a constant water supply for the capital Tushpa and irrigate the surrounding Van plan throughout constructed water channels.
