= Girekol =

Volcano in Turkey

- Map of region

Highest point
- Elevation: 2,145 m (7,037 ft)
- Coordinates: 39.103771°N 43.426148°E

Geography
- Location within Turkey
- Location: Erciş, Van, Turkey
- Parent range: Armenian Highlands

Geology
- Mountain type: Stratovolcano

Girekol or Girekol Tepe is a 2,145-metre-high (7,037 ft) volcano in Van Province, Turkey. It is an alkaline shield volcano and the most recent activity has been dated to 0.36 +/- 0.06 Ma.

Along with the neighboring volcanoes of Mount Meydan and Etrüsk Dağı (Kavşabulak Tepesi), Girekol is part of a volcanic province associated with a regional geological structure called the "Lake Van dome". It lies approximately 10 km (6.2 mi) northeast of the town of Erciş.

The volcano has produced plagiophyric, trachybasaltic lavas that are among the youngest eruption activities on the northern coast of Lake Van. In part, these overlie older volcanic products.
