= Çaldıran =

Çaldıran may refer to:

- Çaldıran, Van, a municipality and district of Van Province, Turkey
- Battle of Chaldiran, 1514

== See also ==
- Chaldoran County, West Azerbaijan province, Iran
