= Lake Hıdırmenteş =

Lake in Turkey

- Location within Turkey
- Location: Çaldıran, Van Province
- Coordinates: 39.179°N 43.7733°E
- Basin countries: Turkey
- Surface elevation: 2.400 m (7 ft 10.5 in)

Lake Hıdırmenteş (Turkish: Hıdırmenteş Gölü); is a lake in Çaldıran district of Van province. It is closer to Çaldıran city center.

It has been declared a sensitive area to be strictly protected by the Presidency.

== Geology and geography ==
Hıdırmenteş Lake was formed as a result of the tectonic movements of the Çaldıran fault. The Çaldıran earthquake, which occurred in 1976, is directly related to this place.
