= Qara Mahammad =

Khan of Qara Qoyunlu from 1380 to 1389

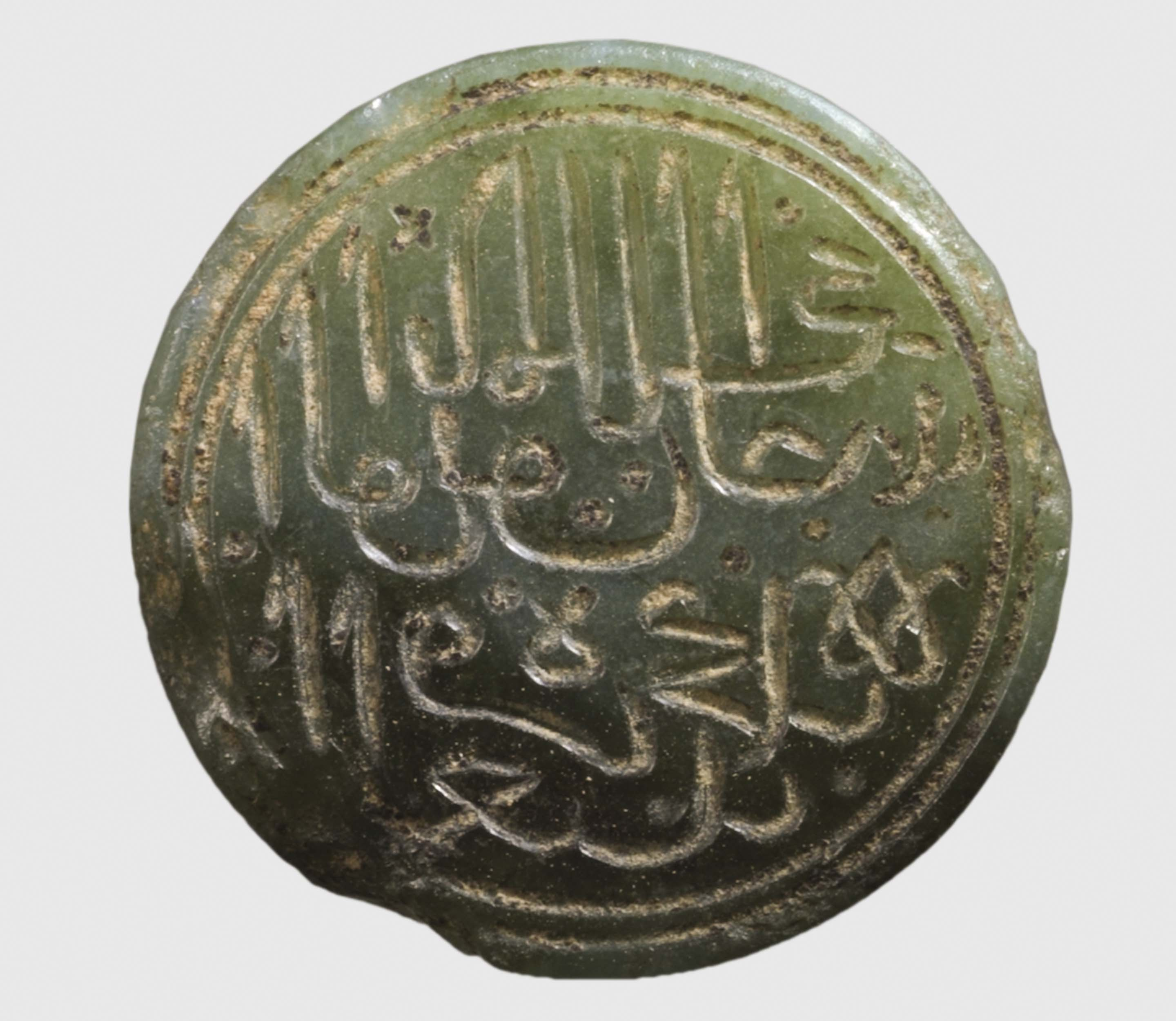
- Seal of Qara Muhammad. Created in western Iran in the second half of the 14th century out of green chalcedony, and inscribed in thuluth script

Khan of Qara Qoyunlu
- Reign: 1380 – 1389
- Predecessor: Bayram Khwaja
- Successor: Qara Yusuf
- Died: April 1389
- Issue: Qara Yusuf
- Dynasty: Qara Qoyunlu
- Father: Qara Dursun
- Religion: Shia Islam

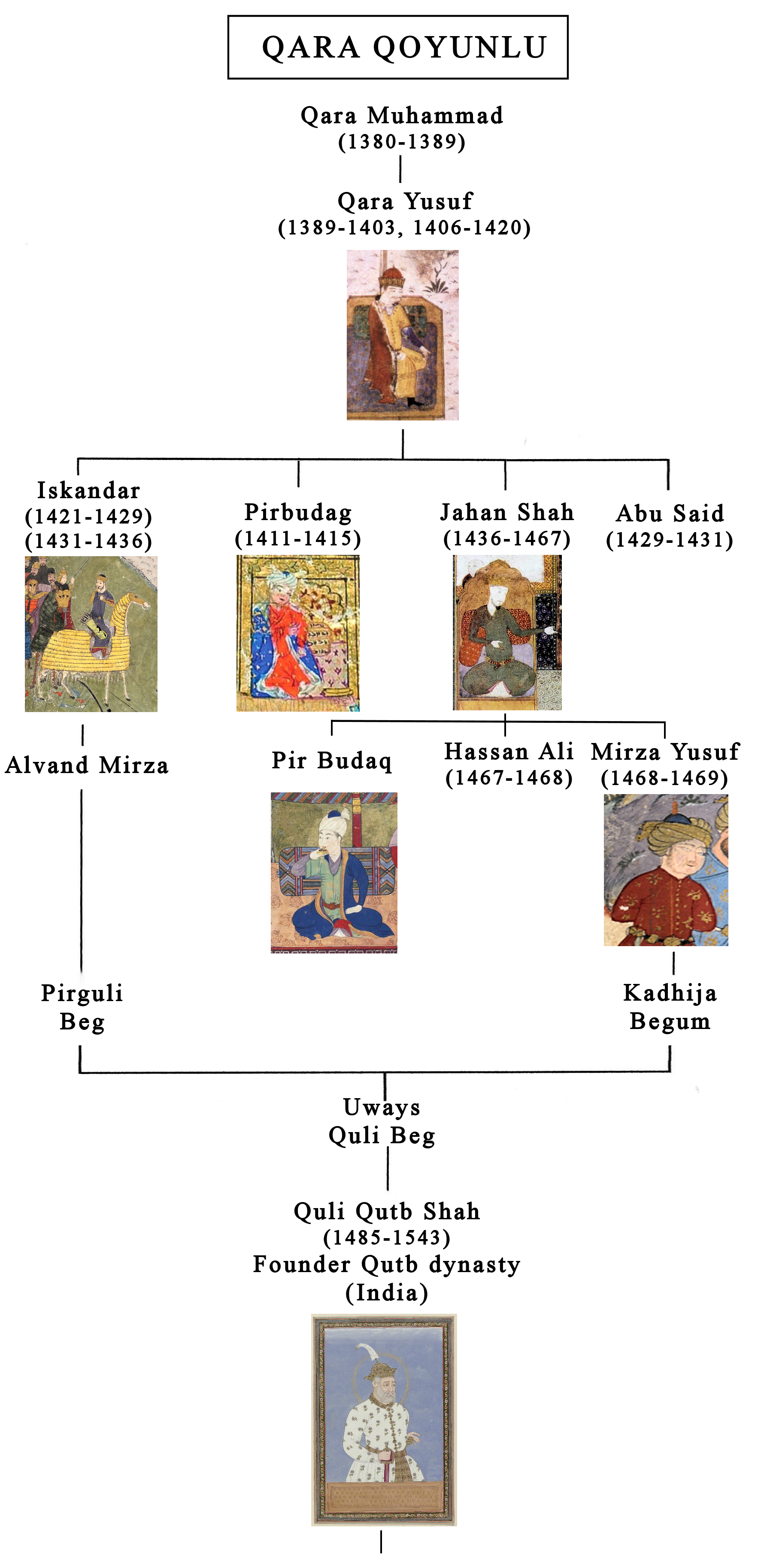
The Qara Qoyunlu dynasty, founded by Qara Mahammad

Qara Mahammad Khan was the second khan of the Qara Qoyunlu from 1380 to 1389. He was the nephew and successor of Bayram Khwaja and father of Qara Yusuf.

== Life ==
Mahammad was a nephew of Bayram Khwaja and one of his main supporters. He served Jalayirid sultan Uways and suppressed Khwaja Marjan's rebellion (governor of Baghdad) for him, installing his uncle Murad as governor of Baghdad. However, their relations deteriorated soon after.

Uways captured Baghdad from Murad in 1364 and advanced to fight Bayram and Qara Mahammad's armies in Muş. Together they conquered Mosul, Erciş, Mayafariqin and Van. New Jalayirid sultan Hussain moved against Muhammad and attacked Erciş, his new base. Despite Bayram Khwaja's help, Qara Qoyunlus suffered heavy casualties and were captured. Hussain too was deposed soon by Ahmad Jalayir, who invaded Tabriz with the assistance of Shirvanshah Hushang (although Minorsky noted a certain Hamza who was a son of Farrukh Yassar being his supporter, it's chronologically impossible).

Ahmad's other brothers, Shaikh Ali and Pir Ali Barik, opposed him. Husein's former amir, Adil Aqa, had Bayazid proclaimed sultan in Soltaniyeh, while Shaykh Ali prepared to leave Baghdad and march on Tabriz. To secure his position, Ahmad requested the assistance of Qara Mahammad. Shaikh Ali fell in battle against the Qara Yusuf on September 1382. Pir Ali was also killed in 1383.

In 1383, Ahmad wed a Jalayirid princess to Qara Muhammad and himself married to a daughter of Qara Muhammad. Some time later, Ahmad ordered Mahammad to migrate to Baghdad with his horde, while Mahammad went to Azerbaijan, later campaigning in Georgia. Jalayirids used this opportunity to massacre Qara Qoyunlus staying in Azerbaijan, which forced Qara Muhammad to fall back to Erciş.

He invaded Mardin in 1384 and received submission of its Artuqid ruler Majd al-Din Isa Al-Zahir (1376-1407). From this point onwards, the Artuqids operated as a vassal state of the Qara Qoyunlu until they were fully annexed in 1409.

Qara Muhammad faced Timur's expeditions four times and successfully evaded them. A Timurid emir, Lala Khwaja, was killed in third expedition by Qara Yusuf.

In 1389, he also aided the Beylik of Erzincan against the Ak Koyunlu and Eretnids. However, he was killed in April 1389 by revolting emir Pir Hasan.

== Family ==
- Bayram (k. April 1389 by Pir Hasan)
- Qara Yusuf
- Khwaja Misr (imprisoned by Timur in Avnik, taken to Samarkand in 1394)
  - Mirza Ali Beg
  - Zeynal Beg
  - Qazan Beg (stole treasury, first fled to Avnik, then entered to Timurid service)
