= Düvenci =

Düvenci can refer to:

- Düvenci, Çorum
- Düvenci, Erciş
