= Bayram Khwaja =

Founder of the Qara Qoyunlu

Khan of Kara Koyunlu
- Reign: 1351 – 1380
- Predecessor: Qara Mansur
- Successor: Qara Mahammad
- Died: 1380
- Dynasty: Qara Qoyunlu
- Father: Qara Mansur
- Religion: Sunni Islam (Hanafi)

Bayram Khwaja Khan (Azerbaijani: بیرم خواجہ) was the founder of the Qara Qoyunlu, a Muslim Turkoman tribal confederation, that in a short space of time came to rule the territory comprising present-day Azerbaijan, Georgia, Armenia, northwestern Iran, eastern Turkey, and northeastern Iraq from about 1374 to 1468.

== Family ==
Bayram Khwaja was the son of Qara Mansur. He had a brother named Qara Dursun, whose son, Qara Mahammad, succeeded Bayram. He had two other brothers: Murad, was governor of Baghdad c. 1364; and Berdi Khwaja. He belonged to the Baharli clan of the Yiva Tribe.

== Biography ==
Under the Mongol rule, Qara Qoyunlu's were subject to the Oirats, and their kishlaks (winter quarters) were near Mosul, while yaylaks were located in the Van region, specifically Erciş. In 1337, Qara Qoyunlu were vassalized by the Sutayids, who gained control of the region. Their head, Pīr Muḥammad was killed by one of his emirs, Husein Beg, in 1350, who was murdered the next year by Bayram Khwaja, usurping control of the territory. Although Bayram Khwaja was initially unsuccessful in taking Mosul from Ordu Bugha, Ḥusayn Beg’s nephew, he eventually captured the city and made his brother, Berdi Khwaja, its governor.

Bayram is first recorded in service to Huseyin beg, a Turkmen warlord who killed Pir Muhammed of Sinjar and usurped his city. Huseyin beg and his company were attacked by the Ayyubid lord of Hasankeyf, Al-Adil, in 1350; however, they defeated him. Bayram in turn usurped Huseyin Beg's position and declared his independence in 1351.

Bayram besieged Mardin, which at the time was ruled by the Artuqid Mansur Ahmed (r. 1363–1367), in 1366. Mansur called for Shaikh Awais Jalayir's help. Awais responded and defeated and subjugated Bayram Khwaja in a battle near Muş. He then besieged Mosul in 1371, but retreated on hearing news of the approach of a Mamluk force.

Bayram acted more independently after Awais' withdrawal. He subsequently invaded Mosul, Sinjar, Surmelu, Khoy and Nakhchivan in 1374. The new Jalairid sultan, Hussain, moved against Qara Mahammad and attacked Erciş, his new base. Despite Bayram's help, the Kara Koyunlus suffered heavy casualties and were subjugated in 1374, becoming vassals of the Jalairid Sultanate, which was centered in Baghdad and Tabriz.

=== Succession ===
Bayram died in 1380 and was succeeded by his brother Berdi Khwaja, about whose reign nothing is known. He was followed by Qara Mahammad.

== Bibliography ==
- Minorsky, V. (1955). "The Qara-qoyunlu and the Qutb-shāhs (Turkmenica, 10)". Bulletin of the School of Oriental and African Studies, University of London. 17 (1): 50–73. doi:10.1017/S0041977X00106342. JSTOR 609229. S2CID 162273460.
- A., Sinclair, T. (1987–1990). Eastern Turkey : an architectural and archaeological survey. London: Pindar Press. p. 397. ISBN 978-0907132325. OCLC 16887803.
- Sümer, Faruk (1978). "Ḳarā-Ḳoyunlu". In van Donzel, E.; Lewis, B.; Pellat, Ch. & Bosworth, C. E. (eds.). The Encyclopaedia of Islam, Second Edition. Volume IV: Iran–Kha. Leiden: E. J. Brill. ISBN 978-90-04-05745-6. OCLC 758278456.
- Sümer, Faruk (2001). "Karakoyunlular". TDV Encyclopedia of Islam, Vol. 24 (Kāânî-i Şîrâzî – Kastamonu) (in Turkish). Istanbul: Presidency of Religious Affairs, Centre for Islamic Studies. pp. 434–438. ISBN 978-975-389-451-7.
- Uzunçarşılı, İsmail Hakkı (1969). Anadolu Beylikleri Ve Akkoyunlu, Karakoyunlu Devletleri [Anatolian Beyliks and Aq Qoyunlu, Qara Qoyunlu States] (in Turkish). Turkish Historical Society Press.
