= Lake Süphan =

Lake in Turkey

- Location within Turkey
- Location: Çaldıran, Van Province
- Coordinates: 38.9646°N 43.8688°E
- Basin countries: Turkey
- Surface area: 1.27 square kilometres (0.49 sq mi)
- Surface elevation: 2.434 m (7 ft 11.8 in)

Lake Süphan (Turkish: Süphan Gölü); is a lake in Çaldıran district of Van province. It is closer to Muradiye district and 67 kilometers away from Van city center.

== Geology and geography ==
Süphan Lake is located in the north of Pırreşit mountain. It is one of the highest lakes in Turkey. It was formed as a result of tectonic movements. The region is covered with alpine meadows.
