= Ulupamir =

- Neighbourhood
- Location in Turkey
- Coordinates: 39°11′N 43°17′E
- Country: Turkey
- Province: Van
- District: Erciş
- Population (2022): 1,544
- Time zone: UTC+3 (TRT)
- Area code: 0432

Ulupamir is a neighbourhood of the municipality and district of Erciş, Van Province, Turkey. Its population is 1,544 (2022). The village is located 132 kilometres from Van and 32 kilometres from Erciş. The village shares Turkey's continental climate zone.

== History ==
Ulupamir (meaning Great Pamir) is a village of mostly Kyrgyz. They came from the Great Pamir and Little Pamir in the Wakhan, northern Afghanistan, in 1982. They fled to Pakistan in 1978 in the aftermath of the Saur Revolution. However they did not adjust well to the hot Pakistani climate and the unsanitary conditions of the refugee camp, so much so that 450 of them lost their lives. They requested 5,000 visas from the United States Consulate in Peshawar for resettlement in Alaska (a region that shares the climate and temperature of the Wakhan). Their request was denied. To solve this situation the group leader proposed to go to Turkey as immigrants and submitted a request for help to the Turkish Embassy in Pakistan.

Kyrgyz from Wakhan region of Afghanistan moved to Pakistan in the 1970s. Nearly 1,100 of these were accepted by Turkey to settle in Ulupamir (or “Great Pamir” in Kyrgyz), their resettlement village in Van Province.

The Turkish Military Government, led by Kenan Evren, having recently taken power in the September 12th coup, accepted this request. 1,150 of the Kyrgyz were taken to Adana by plane. After this they were separated between Malatya and Van Provinces. In 1983, the government of Turgut Özal settled them in the village of Ulupamir where 3,850 Kyrgyz Turks now live. The settlement was deliberately aimed at Turkifying the Kurdish-majority region and was heavily criticized and compared to Israel building Jewish settlements in occupied Palestinian territories.

The documentary film 37 Uses for a Dead Sheep - the story of the Pamir Kirghiz was based on the life of these Kyrgyz in their new home.

== Culture ==
The village has a cultural organization called the "Pamir Cultural Education Organization" (Turkish: Pamir Kültür Eğitim Derneği) which attempts to preserve their cultural and family traditions and hand crafts. .

=== Traditions ===
Generally speaking, they have an older Turkic culture. They are very hospitable and are known for their folk dances and colorful weddings.

Every year in June there is an Ayran Fair which works to preserve the village's identity and unique culture. The event starts by reading the Epic of Manas, with traditional clothes, handcrafts, decorations and symbols on display. The national sport of the Kyrgyz, the mounted "Kökbörü" (Gökböğrü or Buskashi) is played as well as an eating contest.

=== Food ===
The traditional foods include manti stuffed with beshbarmak, Kyrgyz rice, bread and meat, different types of meat and cheese börek and various types of doughy food.

== Economy ==
The village's economy is based primarily on agriculture and animal husbandry.
