= Nairi Zarian =

Armenian writer, poet and playwright

- Նաիրի Զարյան
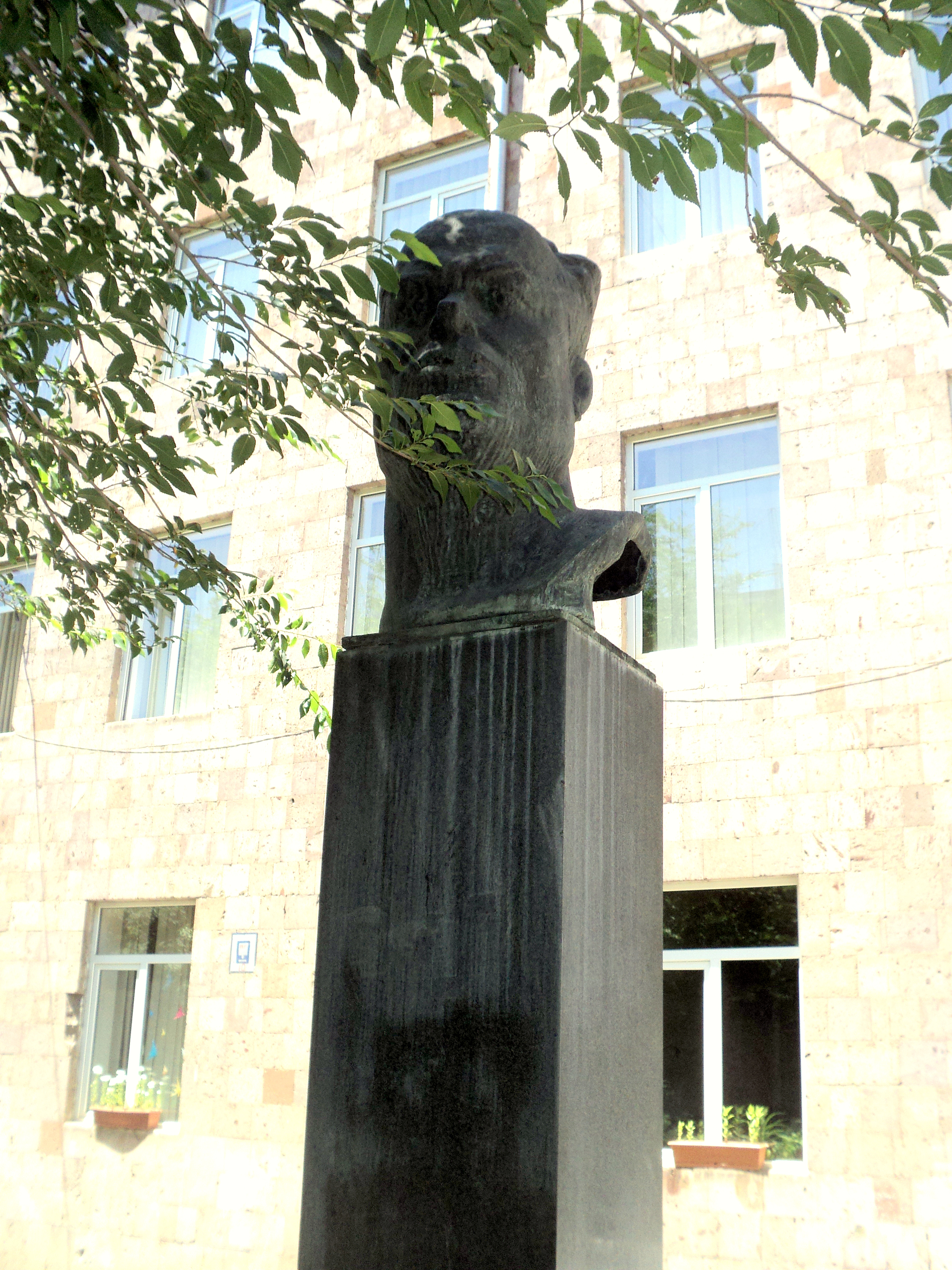
- Born: Hayastan Yegiazari Yeghiazarian; December 31, 1900; Karagündüz, Van Province, Turkey
- Died: July 12, 1969 (aged 68); Yerevan, Armenian SSR
- Education: Yerevan State University
- Occupations: Writer, poet, playwright, public official, political figure
- Years active: 1918-1969

Nairi Zarian (Armenian: Նաիրի Զարյան, born Hayastan Yeghiazarian; December 31, 1900 – July 12, 1969) was a Soviet and Armenian writer, poet and playwright. From 1944 to 1946, he was the President of the Writers Union of Armenia. From 1951 to 1958 he was a Deputy in the Supreme Soviet of the Armenian SSR. He also served as the Chairman of the Armenian Soviet Socialist Republic Committee for the Defense of Peace, the local Armenian branch of Soviet Peace Committee.

== Biography ==
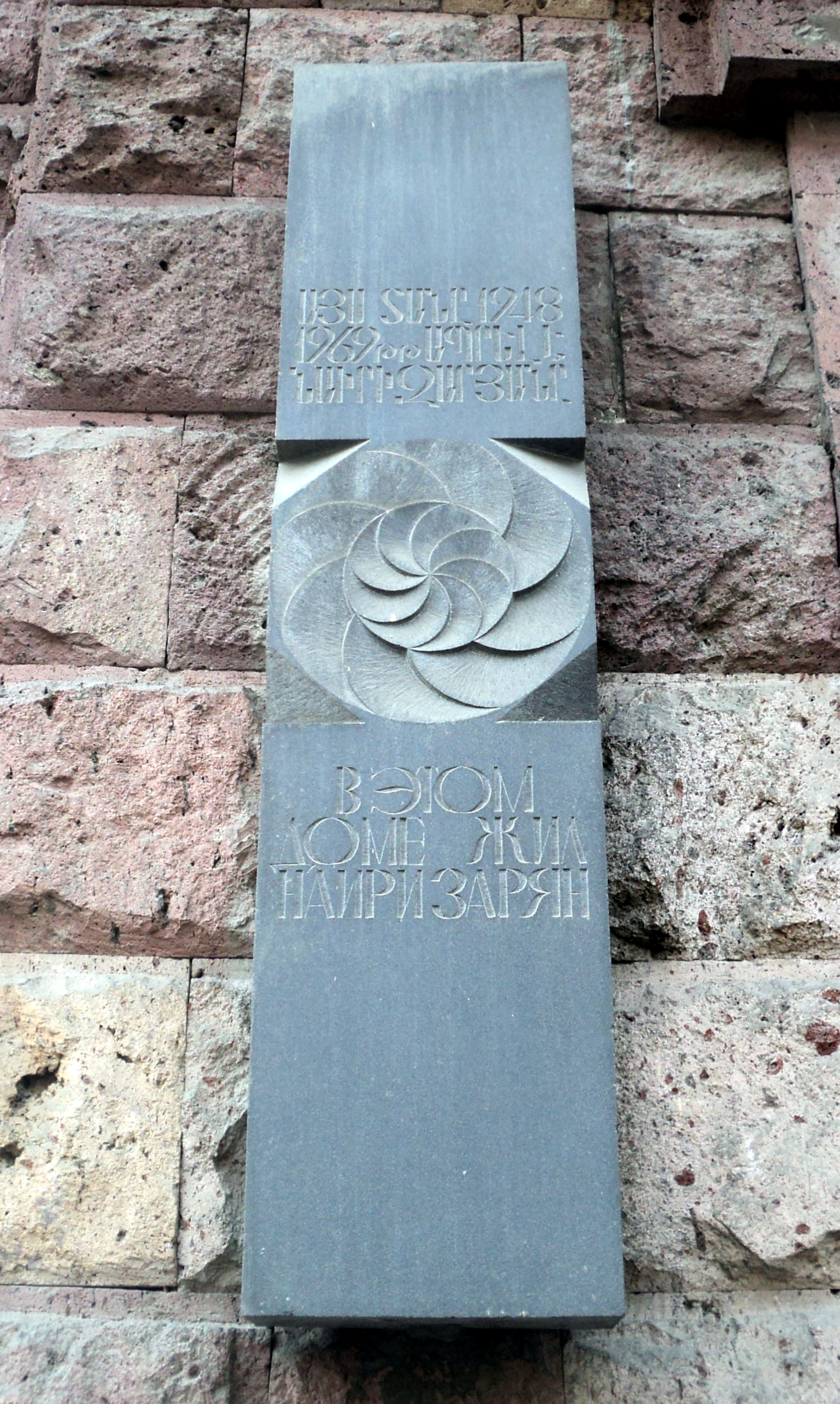
Nairi Zarian's plaque in Yerevan

Nairi Zarian was born on December 31, 1900, in the village of Karagündüz (called Kharakonis by its Armenian inhabitants), near Lake Erçek, in the Van Vilayet of the Ottoman Empire. His parents, Yeghiazar and Hourig Yeghiazaryan, were farmers.

Zarian received his early education at the local parish school, Saint Theodoros. Both of Zarian's parents died during his childhood due to malnutrition and disease, leaving him at the age of fourteen to care for his only surviving younger sister, Yeranuhi, with the support of his aunts and uncles.

In 1915, amid the events of the Van Resistance, Zarian and his sister were compelled to flee their homeland. They joined the mass exodus of Armenian refugees escaping the violence and persecution of the Armenian genocide.

Between 1915 and 1921, Nairi Zarian lived in American missionary orphanages set up and supported by Near East Relief in Yerevan and Dilijan. In 1921, he graduated from the Yerevan parochial school. He graduated from the History Department of Yerevan State University in 1927, then completed his postgraduate studies at the Literary Department of the Leningrad branch of the State Academy of Arts Studies (currently known as Russian Institute for the History of the Arts).

In the poem "Rock of Rushan" (1930) he showed "the socialistic resistance of an Armenian village". His novel Hatsavan (1937, completed and republished in 1947–1949) is dedicated to the process of collectivization. During World War II, Zarian published a large number of poems and notes, in 1943 finishing his poem "The Voice of Homeland". In 1946, his historical tragedy Ara Geghetsik was published. From 1951 to 1958 he was a deputy in the Supreme Soviet of the Armenian SSR.
