= Düvenci, Erciş =

Düvenci
- Neighbourhood
- Location in Turkey
- Coordinates: 39.144°N 43.212°E
- Country: Turkey
- Province: Van
- District: Erciş
- Population (2022): 1,161
- Time zone: UTC+3 (TRT)

Düvenci is a neighbourhood of the municipality and district of Erciş, Van Province, Turkey. Its population is 1,161 (2022). It is 118 km from Van and 18 km from Erciş.

== Population ==
Historical population
Year	Pop.	±% p.a.
1997	1,200	—
2007	1,387	+1.46%
2012	1,562	+2.40%
2017	1,237	−4.56%
2022	1,161	−1.26%
Source: 1997 census and TÜIK (2007-2022)
