= Lake Akgöl =

Lake in Turkey

- Location within Turkey
- Location: Akgöl, Özalp, Van Province
- Coordinates: 38.488°N 43.9233°E
- Lake type: Tectonic
- Basin countries: Turkey
- Max. length: 2.750 m (9 ft 0.3 in)
- Max. width: 1.750 m (5 ft 8.9 in)
- Surface area: 7 km^{2} (2.7 sq mi)
- Max. depth: 5 metres (16 ft)
- Surface elevation: 2.343 m (7 ft 8.2 in)

Lake Akgöl (Turkish: Akgöl Gölü); is a closed-basin tectonic lake located in the borders Özalp district of Van province.

== Geology and geography ==
Lake Akgöl, is a closed basin and fed with snow waters. It is 20 kilometers away from Özalp district and located on the migration path of birds.
