= Mount Meydan =

Volcano in Turkey

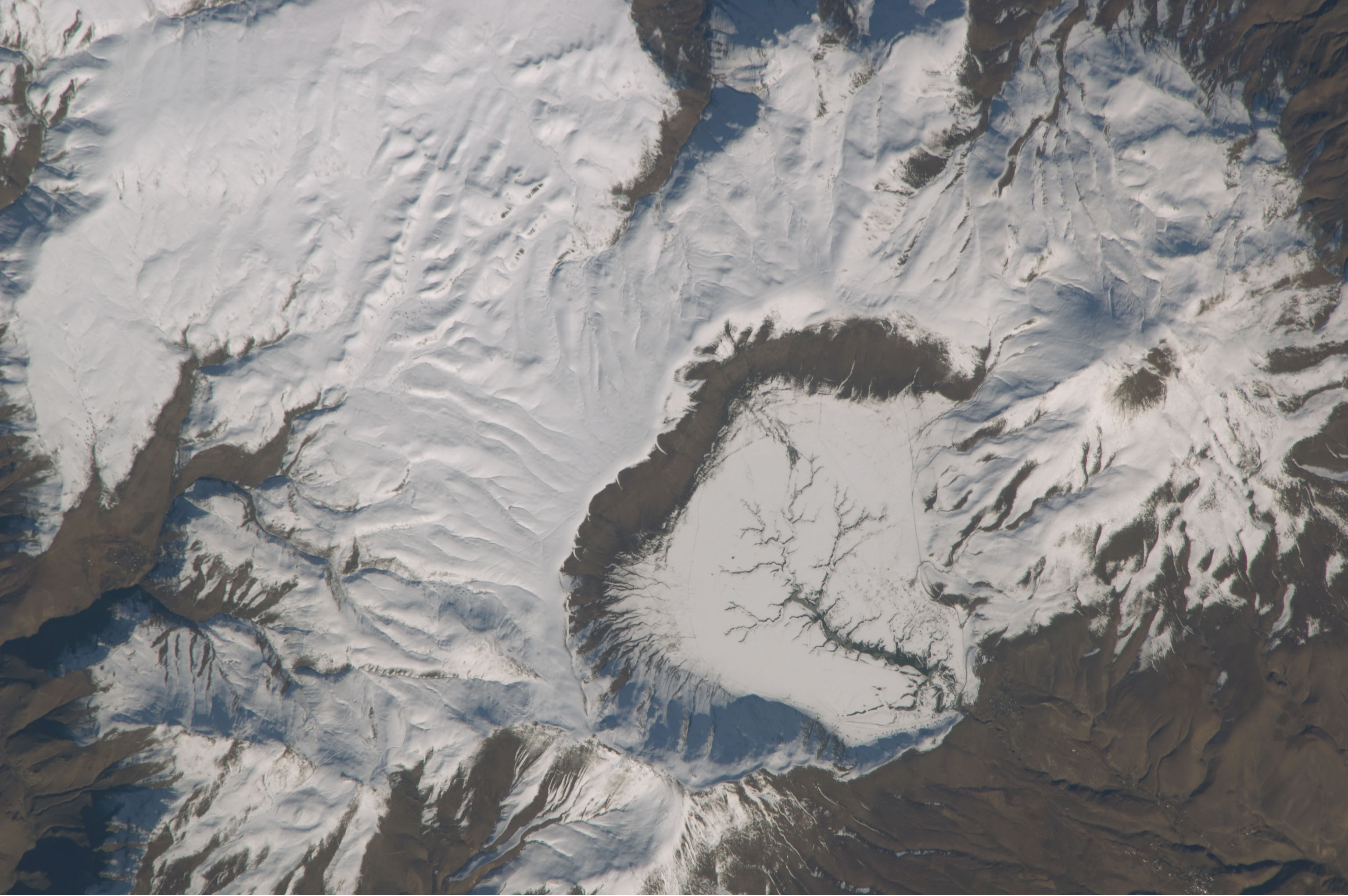
- Photo of the Meydan Volcano caldera and Gürgürbaba. By NASA.

Highest point
- Elevation: 2,328 m (7,638 ft)
- Prominence: 2778
- Coordinates: 39.198889°N 43.181989°E

Geography
- Location within Turkey
- Location: Turkey
- Parent range: Armenian Highlands

Geology
- Mountain type: Stratovolcano

Mount Meydan (Turkish: Meydan Dağı), is an extinct Volcano located in the provincial borders of Van and Ağrı. It is located 7 kilometers northwest of Erciş city. Inside the mountain is a crater and caldera.

== Overview ==
Map of volcanoes surrounding Lake Van.

Meydan Mountain is located at the zero point of the border of Patnos district of Ağrı and Erciş district of Van. Its highest point is 2778 meters with Gürgür Mountain. The base of the caldera is 2320 m. With the collection of surrounding waters in the caldera, the caldera lake was formed. The waters coming out of this lake form the Meydan Stream. Gürgürbaba consists of a relatively soft sloping and symmetrical round dome.

== See also ==
- List of volcanoes in Turkey
- Mount Nemrut
- Akdoğan Mountains
