= Lake Erçek =

Lake in Turkey

- Erçek Gölü; Արճակ լիճ
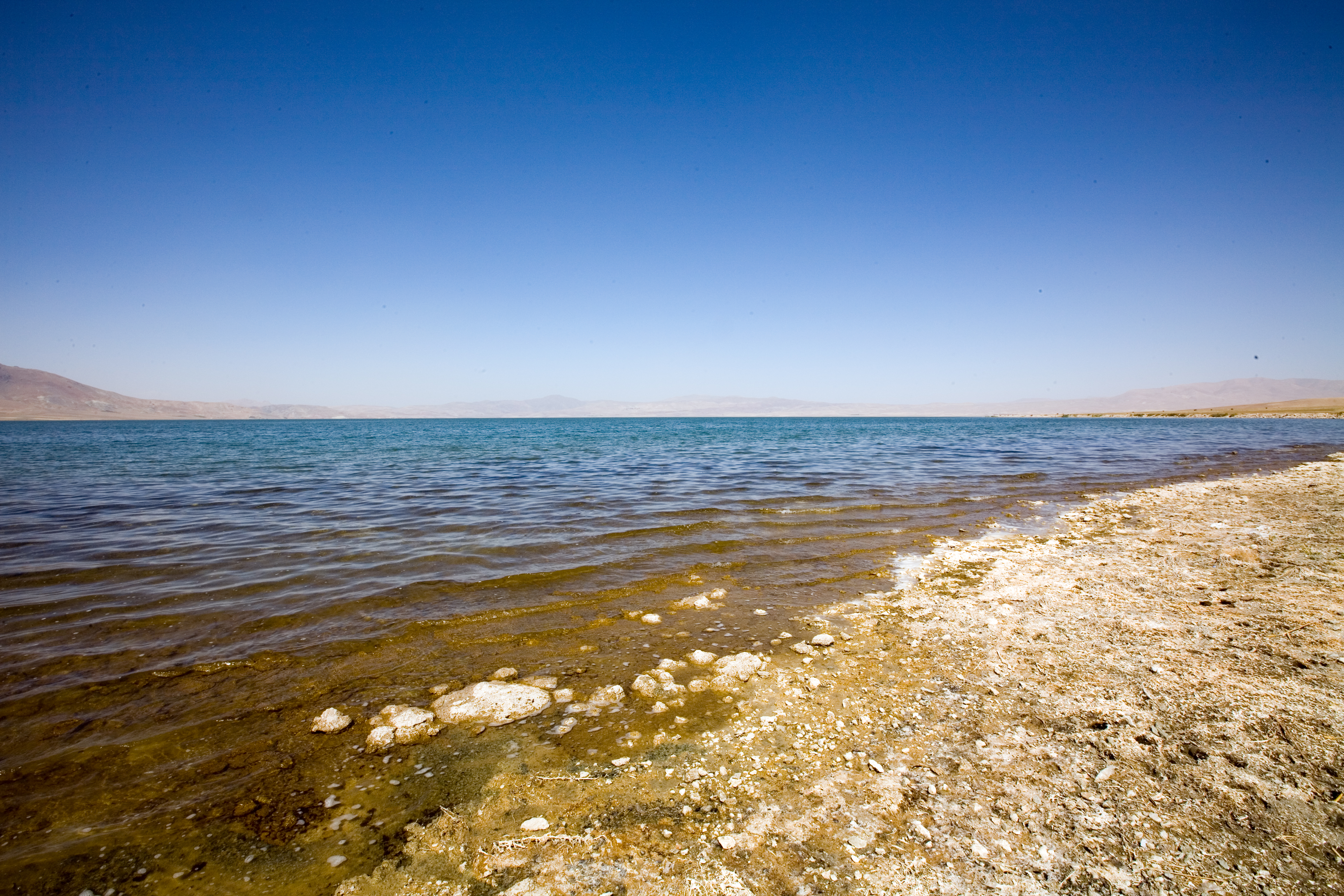

- Location within Turkey
- Location: Erçek, İpekyolu, Van Province, Turkey
- Coordinates: 38.67°N 43.57°E
- Type: soda lake
- Basin countries: Turkey
- Max. length: 16 kilometres (9.9 mi)
- Max. width: 11 kilometres (6.8 mi)
- Surface area: 106.2 km^{2} (41.0 sq mi)
- Average depth: 18.45 metres (60.5 ft)
- Max. depth: 40 metres (130 ft)
- Surface elevation: 1,803 metres (5,915 ft)

Lake Erçek (Turkish: Erçek Gölü, Armenian: Արճակ լիճ, Kurdish: Gola Erçekê) is an endorheic salt lake in Van Province in eastern Turkey, about 30 kilometres (19 mi) east of Lake Van. The lake sits at an elevation of about 1,803 metres (5,915 ft), and has an area of 106.2 square kilometres (41.0 sq mi) and a mean depth of 18.45 metres (60.5 ft). The northern and western shores are steep and rocky, whereas the southern and eastern shores slope gently with mudflats and coastal plains.

== Geology and geography ==
Early research described Lake Erçek as having been formed through volcanic activity; however, recent research indicates that it is a tectonic lake. The lake's basin was formed by north–south trending faults during the Upper Pleistocene. It appears that the lake did not rise much above its current level during the Upper Pleistocene and Holocene, based on examination and radiocarbon dating of core samples of lake sediments. Research suggests the lake did not overflow its basin during this period.

The lake's main inflow is from the Memedik Çayı (also known as the Büyükçaylak Deresi), which enters via a broad fan at the west of the lake. The Karasu river, which rises along the Iranian border, passes within 1 kilometre (0.62 mi) of the northwest shore of the lake and is separated only by a low ridge, but it does not enter the lake and continues west to enter Lake Van northwest of the city of Van.

== Natural history ==
=== Birds ===
Lake Ercek is an important site for breeding and migrating waterbirds. Between 18 and 39 endangered white-headed ducks were recorded at the lake in 2000, including two or three breeding pairs. Other birds recorded as breeding at the lake include the Kentish plover (75–85 pairs) and the greater sandplover (10–15 pairs). The lake is also used in passing by the ruddy shelduck, common shelduck, black-necked grebe, pied avocet and gull-billed tern. In 2020 it was reported that 177 different types of birds have been seen at the lake, 71 of them live there the whole year.

== Gallery ==
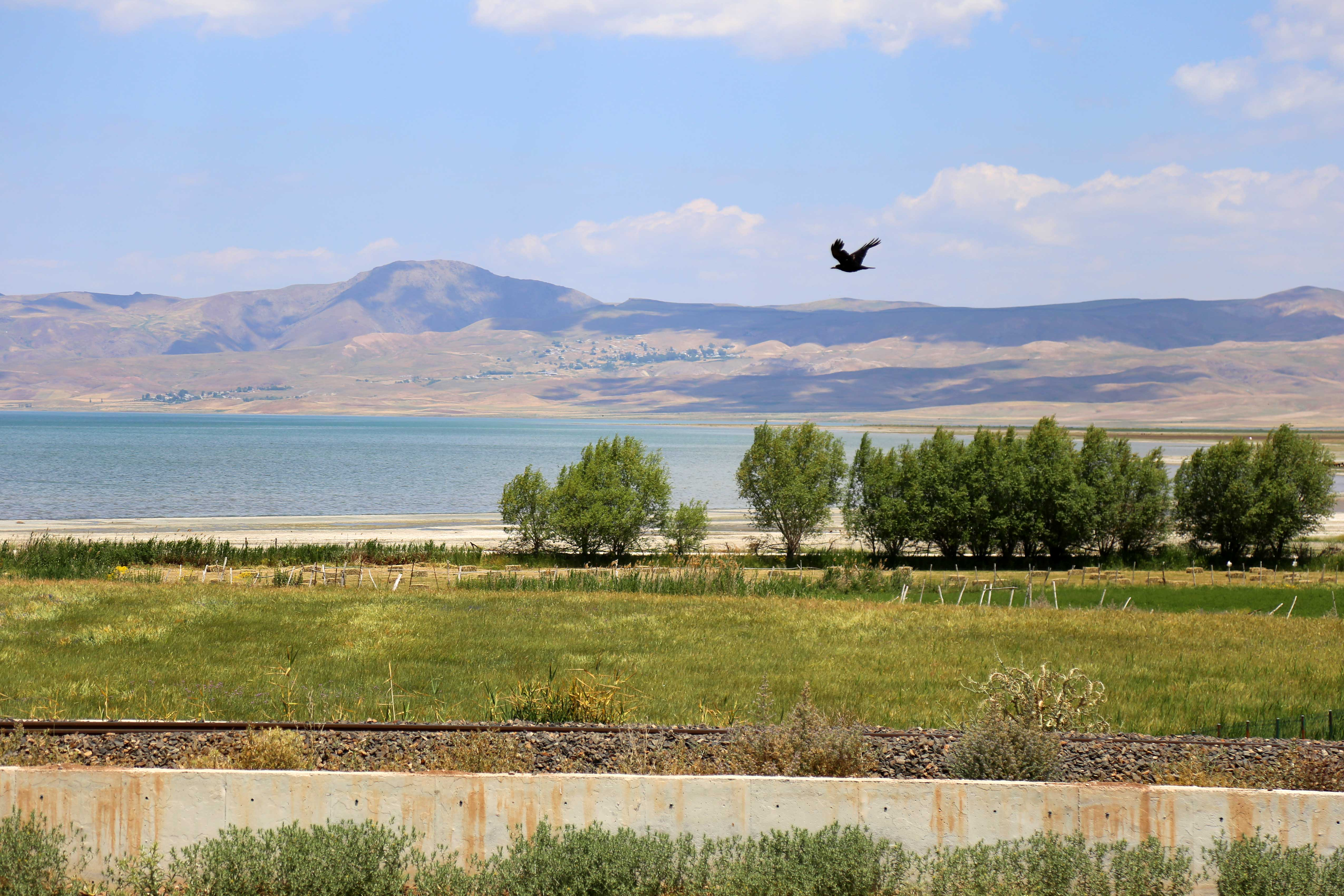
Lake Erçek (Erçek Gölü), Van, Turkey - July 3, 2026

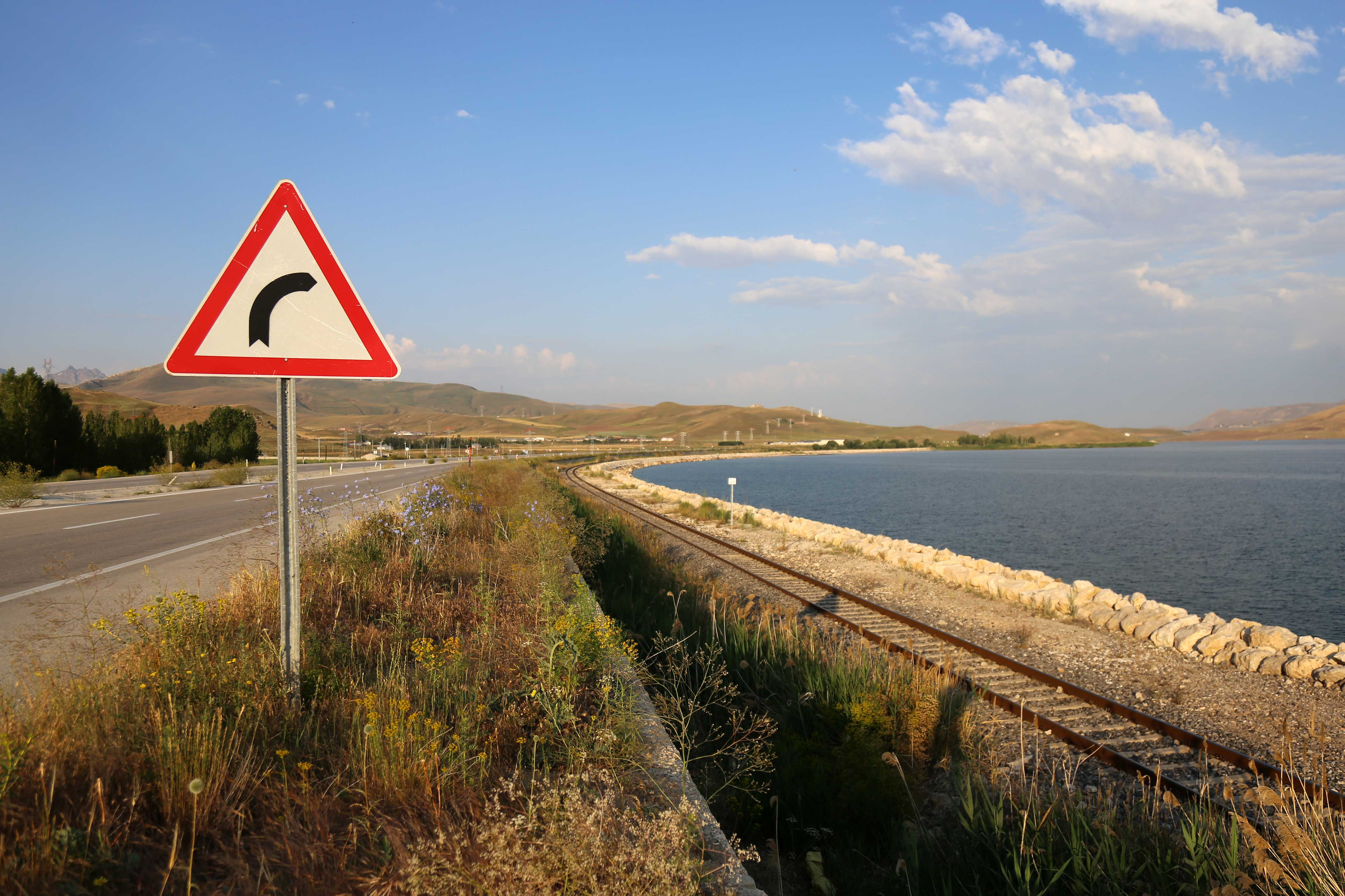
Lake Erçek (Erçek Gölü), Van, Turkey - July 5, 2026

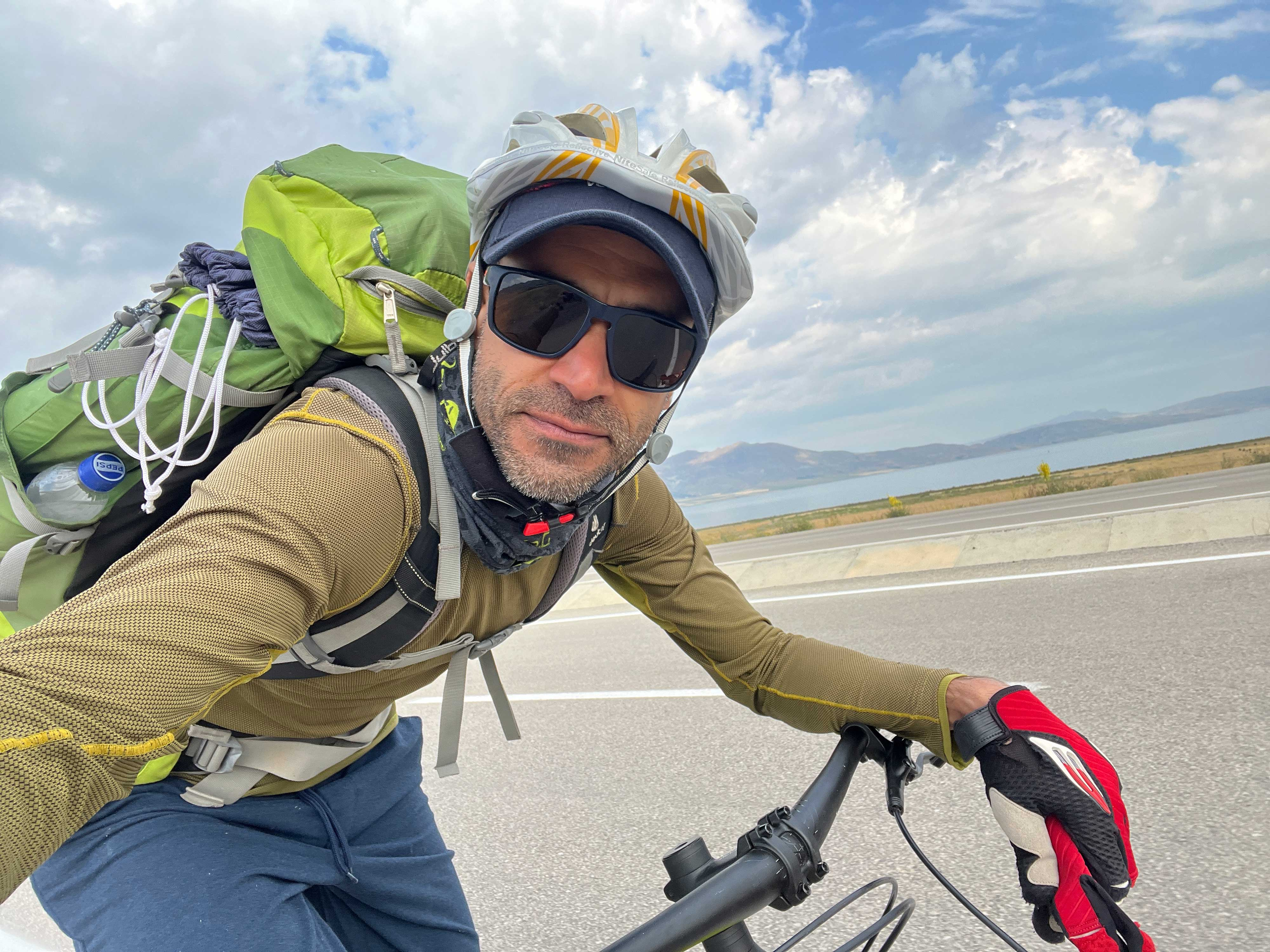
Lake Erçek (Erçek Gölü), Van, Turkey - July 5, 2026

== Sources ==
- Duman, Neşe; Çiçek, İhsan (2012), "Erçek Gölü Havzasinin Jeomorfolojs ve Gölün Oluşumu" [The Geomorphology of Lake Erçek Basin and the Formation of the Lake] (PDF), Uluslararası Sosyal Araştırmalar Dergisi [Journal of International Social Research], 5 (20): 246–260, ISSN 1307-9581
- "BirdLife International (2015) Important Bird and Biodiversity Area factsheet: Erçek Lake". BirdLife International.

== Bibliography ==
- Behçet, L.; Atlan, Y. (1984), "Van-Erçek Turna-Bostaniçi Göllerinin Sucul Florası" [Aquatic Flora of the Van-Erçek and Turna-Bostaniçi Lakes], Turkish Journal of Botany, 18 (2)
- Sarı, M.; İpek, İ.Ş. (1998), Erçek Gölünün Batımetrik Özelliklerinin Belirlenmesi [Determination of the Bathymetric Features of Lake Erçek], Türkiye Bilimsel ve Teknik Araştırma Kurumu, Yer Deniz Atmosfer Bilimleri ve Çevre Araştırma Grubu
- Yıldız, Ş. (1997). Erçek Gölü Zooplankton Türlerinin Aylık ve Mevsimsel Dağılımları [Monthly and Seasonal Distribution of Zooplankton Species in Lake Erçek] (Ph.D. thesis). Van: Yüzüncü Yıl University Institute of Sciences.
- Gündoğdu, S. (2010). Erçek Gölü İnci Kefali Populasyonu üzerine bir araştırma [A Study of the Pearl Mullet Population of Lake Erçek] (M.Sc. thesis). Çukurova University Institute of Sciences.
