= Tuşba =

- District and municipality
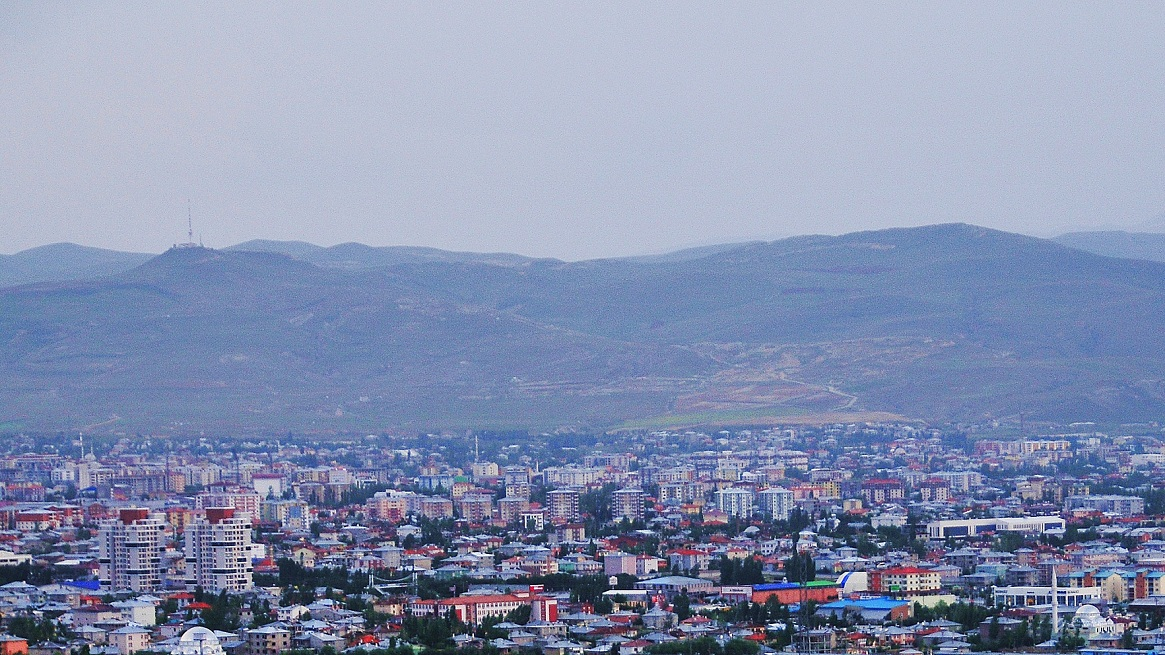

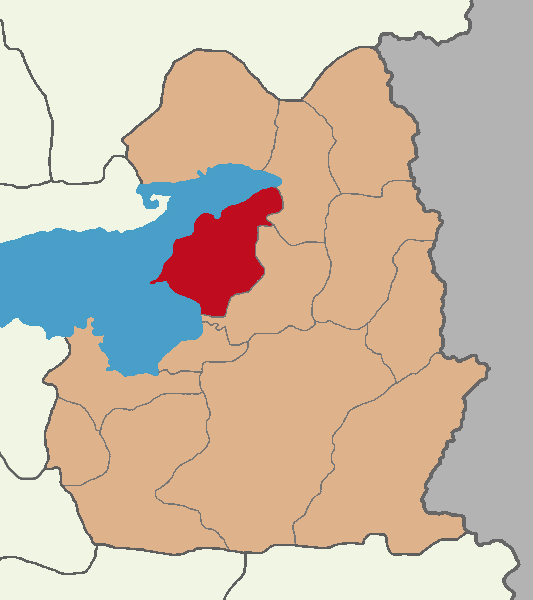
- Map showing Tuşba District in Van Province

- Location within Turkey
- Coordinates: 38°31′4″N 43°26′4″E
- Country: Turkey
- Province: Van

Government
  - Mayor: Salih Akman
- Area: 1,948 km^{2} (752 sq mi)
- Elevation: 1,727 m (5,666 ft)
- Population (2022): 163,301
  - Density: 83.83/km^{2} (217.1/sq mi)
- Time zone: UTC+3 (TRT)
- Area code: 0432
- Website: www.tusba.bel.tr

Tuşba is a municipality and district of Van Province, Turkey. Its area is 1,948 km^{2}, and its population is 163,301 (2022). The district Tuşba was created at the 2013 reorganisation from part of the former central district of Van, along with the new district İpekyolu. It covers the northern part of the agglomeration of Van and the adjacent countryside. The name Tuşba refers to Tushpa, the capital of the 1st millennium BC Urartu kingdom which was situated in Van.

== Composition ==
There are 67 neighbourhoods in Tuşba District:

- Abdurrahmangazi
- Adıgüzel
- Akçaören
- Akçift
- Akköprü
- Alabayır
- Alaköy
- Altıntepe
- Arısu
- Aşit
- Atmaca
- Ayanıs
- Bağdaşan
- Bardakçı
- Beyüzümü
- Çakırbey
- Canik
- Çitören
- Çobanoğlu
- Çolpan
- Çomaklı
- Dağönü
- Değirmenözü
- Derebey
- Dibekdüzü
- Dilimli
- Ermişler
- Esenpınar
- Gedelova
- Göllü
- Gölyazı
- Gülsünler
- Güvençli
- Halkalı
- Hıdır
- İskele
- İstasyon
- Kalecik
- Karaağaç
- Kasımoğlu
- Kelle
- Koçköy
- Kolsatan
- Kozluca
- Kumluca
- Meydancık
- Mollakasım
- Ocaklı
- Otluca
- Özkaynak
- Özyurt
- Pirgarip
- Sağlamtaş
- Şahgeldi
- Satıbey
- Şemsibey
- Seyrantepe
- Tabanlı
- Tevekli
- Topaktaş
- Yanlızağaç
- Yaylıyaka
- Yemlice
- Yeniköşk
- Yeşilköy
- Yeşilsu
- Yumrutepe
