= Mount Erek =

Mountain in eastern Turkey

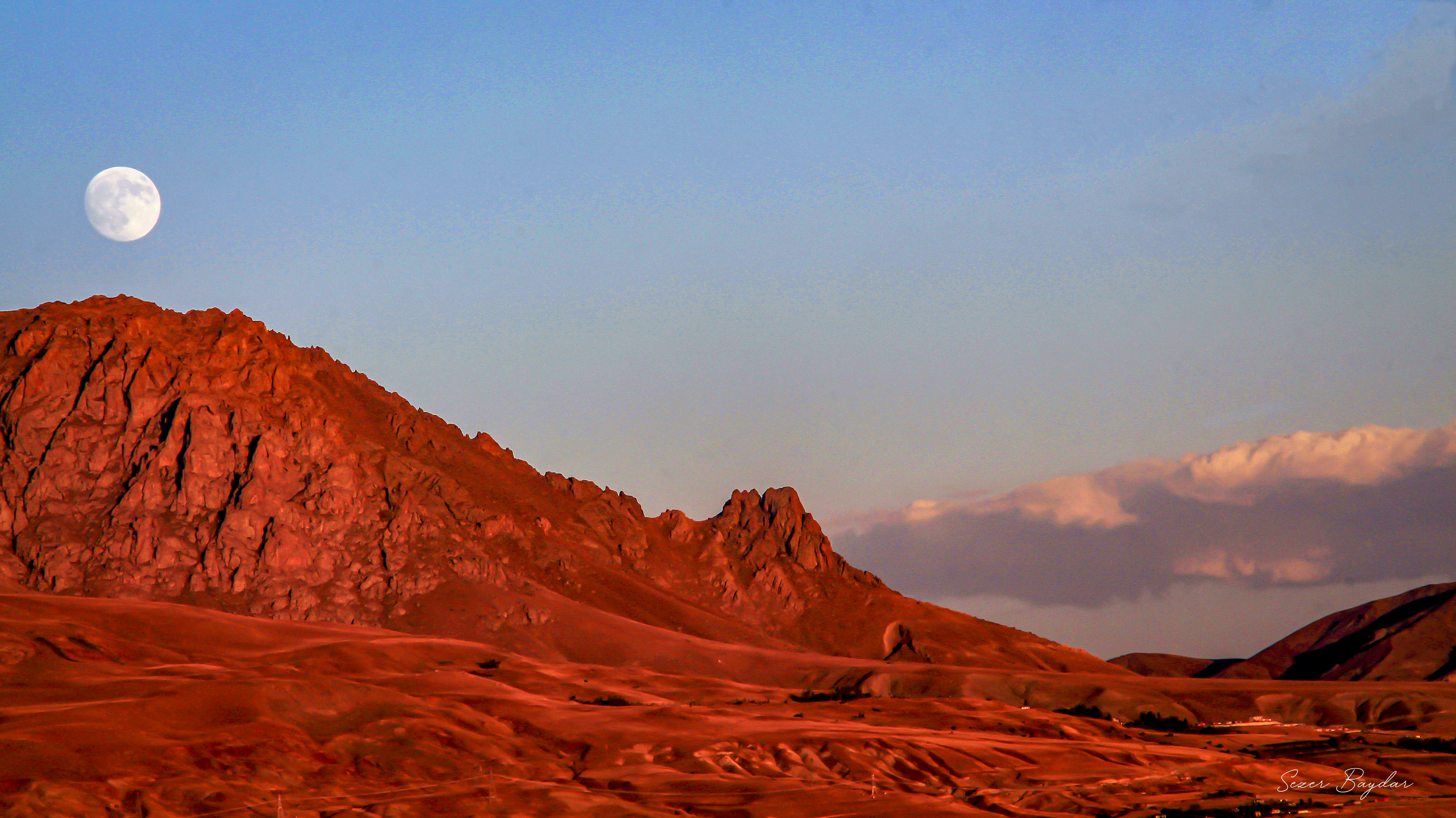
- A view from Mount Erek (September 2017)

Highest point
- Elevation: 3.204 m (10.51 ft); See Elevation section
- Coordinates: 38°27′14″N 43°29′42″E

Naming
- Native name: Erek Dağı (Turkish)

Geography
- Location within Turkey
- Location: Van, Turkey
- Parent range: Armenian Highlands

Mount Erek (Turkish: Erek Dağı, Armenian: Վարագա լեռ, Varaga leř, Kurdish: Çiyayê Erek) a mountain 3,204 meters high overlooking the city of Van in eastern Turkey.

The prominent, now ruined, Armenian monastery of Varagavank ("monastery of Varag") is located at the foot of the mountain. The toponym Varag may have originated from a Middle Iranian of "crow" (waragh in modern Persian).
