= Çaldıran, Van =

Çaldıran
- District and municipality
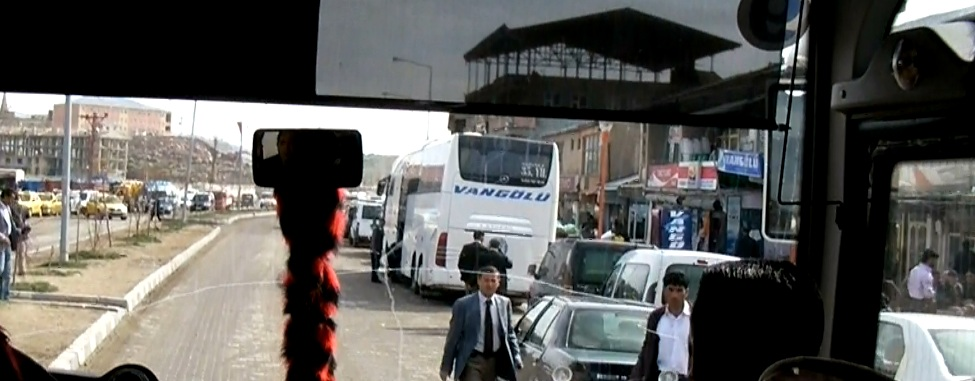
- View from vehicle travelling through Çaldıran town

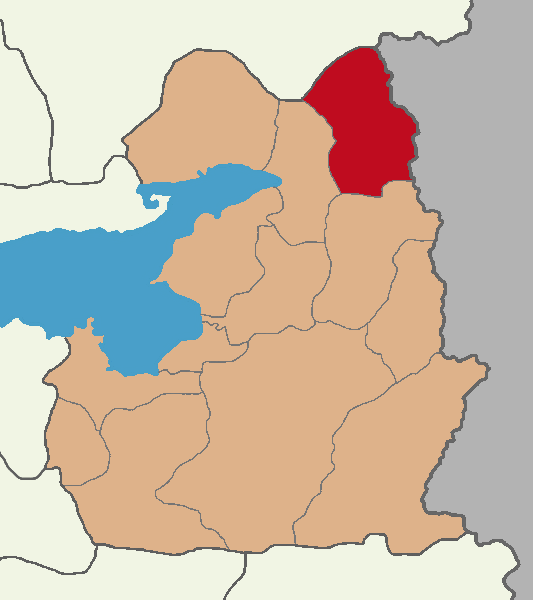
- Map showing Çaldıran District in Van Province

- Location within Turkey
- Coordinates: 39°08′31″N 43°54′50″E
- Country: Turkey
- Province: Van

Government
  - Mayor: Şefık Ensari (AKP)
- Area: 1,478 km^{2} (571 sq mi)
- Population (2022): 58,635
  - Density: 39.67/km^{2} (102.7/sq mi)
- Time zone: UTC+3 (TRT)
- Postal code: 65970
- Area code: 0432
- Website: www.caldiran.bel.tr

Çaldıran (Kurdish: Ebex, Armenian: Աբաղա, romanized: Abaġa) is a municipality and district of Van Province, Turkey. Its area is 1,478 km^{2}, and its population is 58,635 (2022).

As mayor Leyla Atsak from the Peoples' Democratic Party (HDP) was elected in the local elections of March 2019. However Leyla Atsak was barred from holding office by the Supreme Election Board (YSK), despite being approved as a candidate by the YSK before the elections due to have being dismissed from public office in the past. Şefık Ensari from the Justice and Development Party (AKP) who came in second in the elections was given the mayorship instead. Hasan Hüsnü Türker became the kaymakam in August 2021.

The town is in an earthquake prone area; 3,840 people were killed by a 7.2 magnitude earthquake in 1976.

In the district was found an archaeological site of a former building on a hill 2000 m above sea level.

== Archaeology ==
In June 2022, Turkish-Mongolian archaeologists led by Ersel Çağlıtütuncigil announced the discovery of the ruins of a summer palace (caravanserai) thought to have been constructed by the Mongol Ilkhanate State ruler Hulagu Khan and decorated with swastika or "tamga" shaped roof tiles in the 1260s. Ceramic kilns, tricolor-glazed ceramics, bricks, glazed roof tiles, porcelain were also among the finds.

== Composition ==
There are 70 neighbourhoods in Çaldıran District:

- Akbaşak
- Alakaya
- Alikelle
- Altıyol
- Aşağı Çanak
- Aşağı Dikme
- Aşağı Gülderen
- Aşağı Kuyucak
- Aşağı Mutlu
- Aşağı Yanıktaş
- Avcıbaşı
- Ayrancılar
- Başeğmez
- Baydoğan
- Beyazıt
- Bezirhane
- Buğulukaynak
- Burçakalan
- Çayırköy
- Çubuklu
- Cumhuriyet
- Demircik
- Direkli
- Doyumalan
- Erginler
- Evciler
- Fatih
- Gülyolu
- Güngören
- Hangediği
- Hanköy
- İncealan
- İsmailbaba
- Kalkandelen
- Karadulda
- Kaşım
- Kılavuz
- Kilimli
- Koçovası
- Kurtoğlan
- Kuskunkıran
- Osmanlı
- Recep Tayip Erdoğan
- Salhane
- Sarıçimen
- Sarıharman
- Şehit Jandarma Binbaşı Kıvanç Cesur
- Sellik
- Serpmetaş
- Soğuksu
- Sungur
- Tekindere
- Temrenli
- Toprakseven
- Umuttepe
- Yağıbasan
- Yassıtepe
- Yavuzselim
- Yaykılıç
- Yeniyaka
- Yücelen
- Yukarı Çanak
- Yukarı Dikme
- Yukarı Gülderen
- Yukarı Kuyucak
- Yukarı Mutlu
- Yukarı Sağmallı
- Yukarı Yanıktaş
- Yuvacık
- Zülfibulak

== Climate ==
At 2,050 m (6,726 ft) above sea level, Çaldıran has a humid continental climate, with Mediterranean influences (Dsb, according to the Köppen climate classification). Summers are mild and dry and winters are cold and snowy, with very low temperatures, due to its elevation. The lowest temperature recorded in Çaldıran is -46.4 °C on 9 January 1990 and It is also the lowest temperature recorded in Turkey.

Climate data for Çaldıran, Van, Turkey
Month	Jan	Feb	Mar	Apr	May	Jun	Jul	Aug	Sep	Oct	Nov	Dec	Year
Mean daily maximum °C (°F)	−1.8 (28.8)	−0.9 (30.4)	3.5 (38.3)	10.8 (51.4)	16.4 (61.5)	21.9 (71.4)	27.3 (81.1)	27.3 (81.1)	23.1 (73.6)	15.0 (59.0)	7.7 (45.9)	0.6 (33.1)	12.6 (54.6)
Daily mean °C (°F)	−6.7 (19.9)	−5.9 (21.4)	−1.1 (30.0)	5.5 (41.9)	10.3 (50.5)	14.6 (58.3)	19.4 (66.9)	19.2 (66.6)	14.8 (58.6)	8.3 (46.9)	2.5 (36.5)	−3.7 (25.3)	6.4 (43.6)
Mean daily minimum °C (°F)	−11.6 (11.1)	−10.8 (12.6)	−5.6 (21.9)	0.3 (32.5)	4.2 (39.6)	7.4 (45.3)	11.6 (52.9)	11.1 (52.0)	6.5 (43.7)	1.6 (34.9)	−2.6 (27.3)	−8.0 (17.6)	0.3 (32.6)
Average precipitation mm (inches)	31 (1.2)	37 (1.5)	41 (1.6)	58 (2.3)	61 (2.4)	39 (1.5)	17 (0.7)	13 (0.5)	15 (0.6)	49 (1.9)	41 (1.6)	37 (1.5)	439 (17.3)
Source: Climate-data.org (unofficial, modelled data)

== See also ==
- Battle of Çaldıran
