= Erciş =

District and municipality in Van Province, Turkey

Erciş Արճեշ • Erdiş
- District and municipality
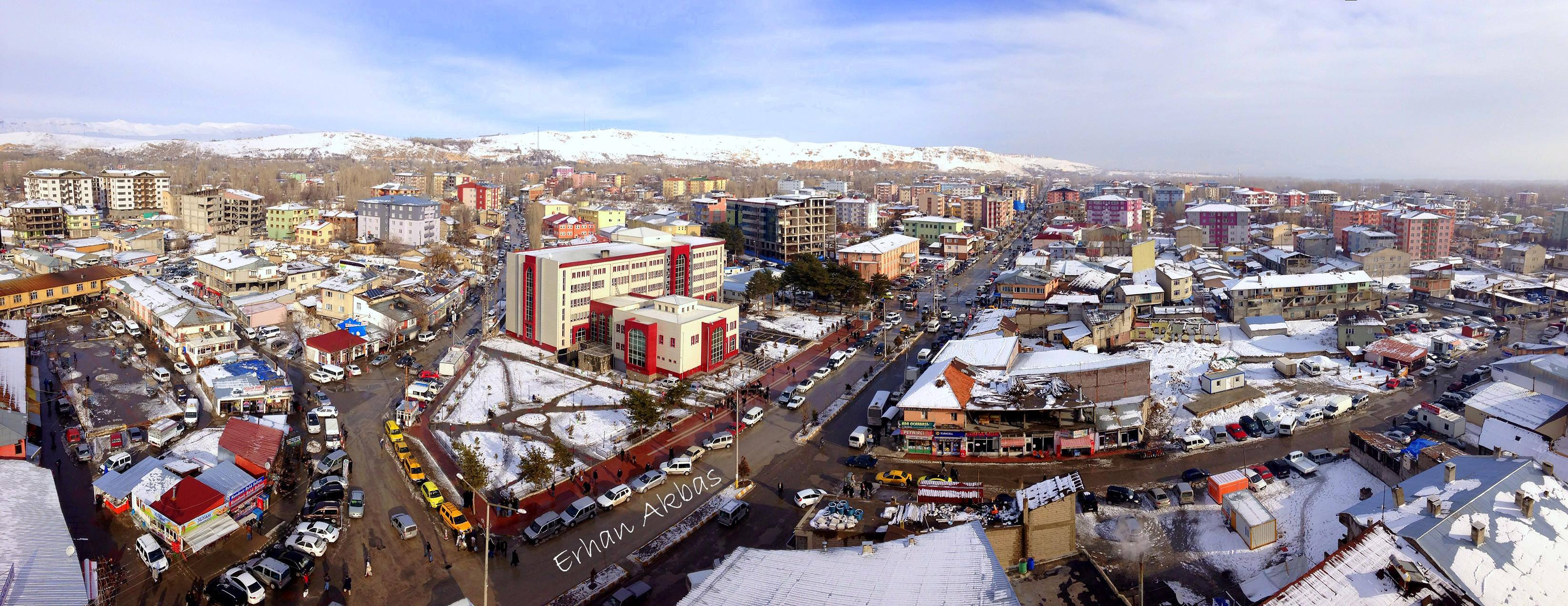
- Panorama of Erciş

- Logo

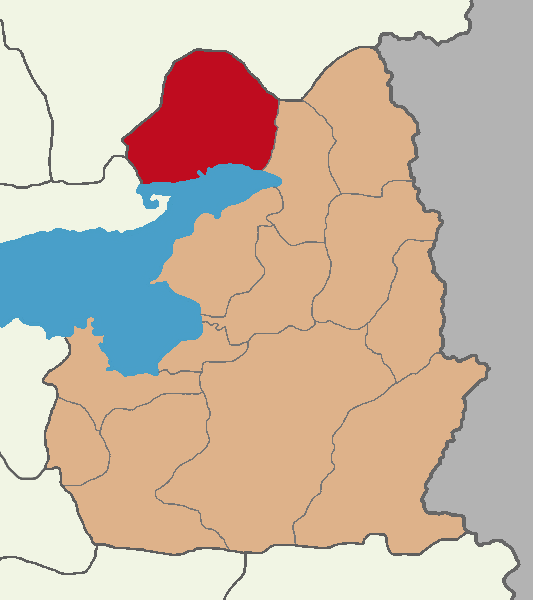
- Map showing Erciş District in Van Province

- Location within Turkey
- Coordinates: 39°01′52″N 43°21′35″E
- Country: Turkey
- Province: Van
- Area: 2,133 km^{2} (824 sq mi)
- Population (2022): 171,000
  - Density: 80.2/km^{2} (208/sq mi)
- Time zone: UTC+3 (TRT)
- Postal code: 65400
- Area code: 0432
- Website: www.ercis.bel.tr

Erciş (pronounced [æɾˈdʒiʃ]; Kurdish: Erdiş; Armenian: Ականց, romanized: Akants, historically Արճեշ, Arčeš) is a municipality and district of Van Province, Turkey. Its area is 2,133 km^{2}, and its population is 171,000 (2022). It is located at the northern end of Lake Van. Erciş is predominantly Kurdish.

== History ==
During Classical Antiquity, the town was known as Arsissa, and Archesh (Arčeš) in Armenian and Arjish in Arabic. The Byzantines knew it as Arzes (Ἂρζες or Ἀρζές) and the 10th-century emperor Constantine VII Porphyrogennetos wrote in his De administrando imperio (Chapter XLIV) that it was under the rule of the Kaysite emirate of Manzikert.

This small district served as the capital city of a number of ruling states. It was the main center of the province of Turuberan as part of the ancient Armenian Empire. The city changed hands on several occasions between the Arabs and the Byzantines, in the early Middle Ages. From the mid 1020s onwards Archesh was governed by the Byzantines. In 1054, it was captured and sacked by the Seljuk Turks commanded by Tuğrul after an eight-day siege. It was indefinitely conquered by the Turks following the Battle of Manzikert in 1071. It was fortified in the early 14th century by the Ilkhanid vizier Ali Shah. Archesh became part of the Qara Qoyunlu state and later became a part of the Ottoman Empire.

From 18th century, because of the increase of level of Lake Van the old town (called Archesh) slowly disappeared. By the second half of the 19th century few traces of the buildings, churches and dwelling houses remained. After old Archesh/Erciş was flooded by water, the city was moved to north to a much higher place called Alada in 1841. There the new town was built called Akants (Նոր Արճեշ (Armenian pronunciation: [ɑɾtʃɛʃ], New Artchesh in Armenian and Erciş (Turkish pronunciation: [eɾdʒiʃ]) in Turkish). While the new site inherited the old city's name and identity, as well as most of the population, some of the old site's residents moved out into the surrounding countryside instead and settled in villages such as Çelebibaği. In 1890 64% of the population of the district was Armenian.

The Armenian population was wiped out during the Armenian genocide of 1915. That same year Russian forces captured the city during the Caucasus Campaign. They were replaced by makeshift Armenian forces after December 1917. These were eventually driven out by the Turkish forces on April 1, 1918.

In July 1930 in Erçis occurred the Zilan Massacre in which the Turkish army massacred thousands of local civilian Kurds. The Erciş district also experienced forced evacuations of some of its inhabitants as a consequence of the Turkish-Kurdish conflict.

The city was shaken by a major earthquake on 23 October 2011.

== Government ==
District Governor Nuri Mehmetbeyoğlu was appointed as a trustee for the Erçis municipality.

== Population ==
The total population of the district at the end of 2022 was 171,000.

== Geography ==
The district covers an area of 2,133 km² and is surrounded by Muradiye District to the east, Bitlis Province to the west, Ağrı Province on the north and by Lake Van on the south. There is a volcanic mountain and caldera called Mount Meydan in the district.

To the north of Erciş is a large, steep highland area known as the Ala Dağ (literally "mottled mountain"), which contains the tributaries of the Zilan Dere. This is part of a general highland belt that separates the small plains north of Lake Van from the districts of Doğubayazıt and Diyadin further north. The Mount Süphan and Mount Nemrut further west are also part of this highland belt, as is the Mount Tendürek immediately to the east. The Ala Dağ's underlying rock is fairly soft and as a result the whole area is eroded into many sharp ridges. However, many of these ridges are covered in grass. There are villages in some of the valleys in the Ala Dağ, and there was historically a route cutting through some of these valleys to reach Diyadin further north. Historical records also refer to an "Ala Dağ" as the site of an Ilkhanid palace and a grazing area for Mongol pastoralists, but this seems to be referring to a different place.

It is one of the most developed cities in eastern Turkey and it is the place where the folk songs are still alive. Many kinds of fruits and vegetables are raised. Planting of poplar trees is widely seen in the city and surroundings.

=== Climate ===
Erciş has a dry-summer continental climate (Köppen: Dsb/Dsa), with hot, dry summers, and cold winters.

Climate data for Erciş (1991–2020)
Month	Jan	Feb	Mar	Apr	May	Jun	Jul	Aug	Sep	Oct	Nov	Dec	Year
Mean daily maximum °C (°F)	1.1 (34.0)	2.2 (36.0)	7.2 (45.0)	13.6 (56.5)	19.5 (67.1)	26.1 (79.0)	30.7 (87.3)	31.0 (87.8)	25.8 (78.4)	18.4 (65.1)	10.2 (50.4)	3.5 (38.3)	15.8 (60.4)
Daily mean °C (°F)	−5.0 (23.0)	−4.1 (24.6)	1.1 (34.0)	7.2 (45.0)	12.4 (54.3)	17.8 (64.0)	21.9 (71.4)	21.7 (71.1)	16.3 (61.3)	10.0 (50.0)	3.3 (37.9)	−2.3 (27.9)	8.4 (47.1)
Mean daily minimum °C (°F)	−9.4 (15.1)	−8.7 (16.3)	−3.5 (25.7)	2.0 (35.6)	6.2 (43.2)	10.0 (50.0)	13.9 (57.0)	13.6 (56.5)	8.6 (47.5)	4.0 (39.2)	−1.5 (29.3)	−6.3 (20.7)	2.5 (36.5)
Average precipitation mm (inches)	32.42 (1.28)	33.1 (1.30)	51.16 (2.01)	67.59 (2.66)	52.87 (2.08)	16.72 (0.66)	8.99 (0.35)	3.72 (0.15)	12.91 (0.51)	42.82 (1.69)	39.95 (1.57)	37.55 (1.48)	399.8 (15.74)
Average precipitation days (≥ 1.0 mm)	6.1	6.1	8.3	10.2	9.2	3.9	2.3	1.8	2.7	6.1	5.6	6.6	68.9
Average relative humidity (%)	66.6	65.9	64.6	61.8	59.7	53.2	49.6	50.6	55.2	63.9	64.4	67.2	60.2
Source: NOAA

== Composition ==
There are 102 neighbourhoods in Erciş District:

- Adnan Menderes
- Ağaçören
- Ağırkaya
- Akbaş
- Akçayuva
- Aksakal
- Alkanat
- Apdalmezrası
- Aşağıakçagedik
- Aşağıçökek
- Aşağıgöze
- Aşağıışıklı
- Aşağıkozluca
- Bayazıt
- Bayramlı
- Bozyaka
- Bucakönü
- Bulamaç
- Çakırbey
- Camikebir
- Çatakdibi
- Çataltepe
- Çelebibağı
- Çetintaş
- Çimen
- Çobandüzü
- Çubuklu
- Deliçay
- Derekent
- Derimevi
- Dinlence
- Doğancı
- Doluca
- Duracak
- Düvenci
- Ekiciler
- Ergücü
- Evbeyli
- Gedikdibi
- Gergili
- Gökoğlan
- Gölağzı
- Görüşlü
- Gözütok
- Gültepe
- Gümüşoluk
- Hacıkaş
- Hasanabdal
- Haydarbey
- Hocaali
- İkizçalı
- İşbaşı
- Kadirasker
- Karatavuk
- Kardoğan
- Karlıyayla
- Kasımbağı
- Kayaboyun
- Kekiksırtı
- Keklikova
- Kırkdeğirmen
- Kırkpınar
- Kışla
- Kızılören
- Kocapınar
- Koçköprü
- Köycük
- Latifiye
- Mağara
- Nişancı
- Örene
- Ortayayla
- Oyalı
- Payköy
- Pınarlı
- Sabanbüken
- Sahil Kent
- Salihiye
- Salmanağa
- Şehirpazar
- Şerefli
- Söğütlü
- Taşevler
- Taşkapı
- Taşlıçay
- Tekevler
- Tekler
- Topraklı
- Ulupamir
- Uncular
- Vanyolu
- Yalındam
- Yankıtepe
- Yeşilova
- Yetişen
- Yılanlı
- Yoldere
- Yöreli
- Yukarıakçagedik
- Yukarıçınarlı
- Yukarıışıklı
- Yünören

== See also ==
- 2011 Van earthquake
- Zilan massacre
