= İpekyolu =

- District and municipality
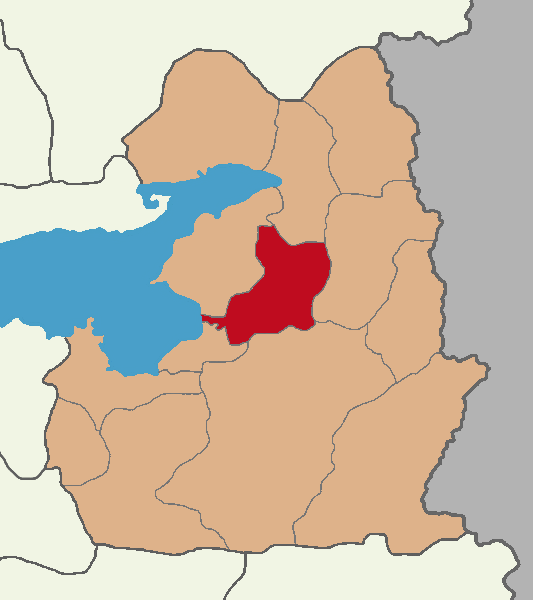
- Map showing İpekyolu District in Van Province

- Location in Turkey
- Coordinates: 38.4658°N 43.3431°E
- Country: Turkey
- Province: Van
- Area: 956 km^{2} (369 sq mi)
- Population (2022): 348,046
  - Density: 364/km^{2} (943/sq mi)
- Time zone: UTC+3 (TRT)
- Area code: 0432
- Website: www.ipekyolu.bel.tr

İpekyolu is a municipality and district of Van Province, Turkey. Its area is 956 km^{2}, and its population is 348,046 (2022). The district İpekyolu was created at the 2013 reorganisation from part of the former central district of Van, along with the new district Tuşba. It covers the central and eastern part of the agglomeration of Van and the adjacent countryside. The name İpekyolu means Silk Road; Van was an important stop on the Silk Road.

== Politics ==
On 30 March 2014, Aygül Bidav from the Peace and Democracy Party (BDP) was elected the first mayor of İpekyolu. But a trustee was appointed on the 11 September 2016. In the local elections in March 2019 Azim Yacan from the Peoples Democratic Party (HDP) became Mayor. Following Şehzade Kurt was elected Co-Mayor of İpekyolu. In November 2019, Yacan and Kurt were arrested accused of being a member of a terrorist organization and a trustee was appointed. The current District Governor is Sinan Aslan.

== Composition ==
There are 51 neighbourhoods in İpekyolu District:

- Ağzıkara
- Aktaş
- Alipaşa
- Arıtoprak
- Aşağıçitli
- Aşağıgölalan
- Bahçivan
- Baklatepe
- Bakraçlı
- Beşçatak
- Bostaniçi
- Buzhane
- Çalımlı
- Cevdetpaşa
- Cumhuriyet
- Değirmenarkı
- Değirmenköy
- Dereüstü
- Dibekli
- Eminpaşa
- Erçek
- Esenler
- Gövelek
- Hacıbekir
- Hafiziye
- Halilağa
- Hatuniye
- Ilıkaynak
- Irgat
- Karagündüz
- Karakoç
- Karpuzalanı
- Karşıyaka
- Kavuncu
- Kaymaklı
- Kevenli
- Kıratlı
- Köşebaşı
- Ortanca
- Sarmaç
- Selimbey
- Şerefiye
- Serhat
- Seyitfehimarvasi
- Vali Mithatbey
- Yalı
- Yalınağaç
- Yatıksırt
- Yenimahalle
- Yukarıgölalan
- Yukarıgüneyce

== Notable people ==
- Hanımzer Melet (born 1993), national team wheelchair basketball player.
