= Van Province =

Province of Turkey

Van Province Van ili
- Province and metropolitan municipality
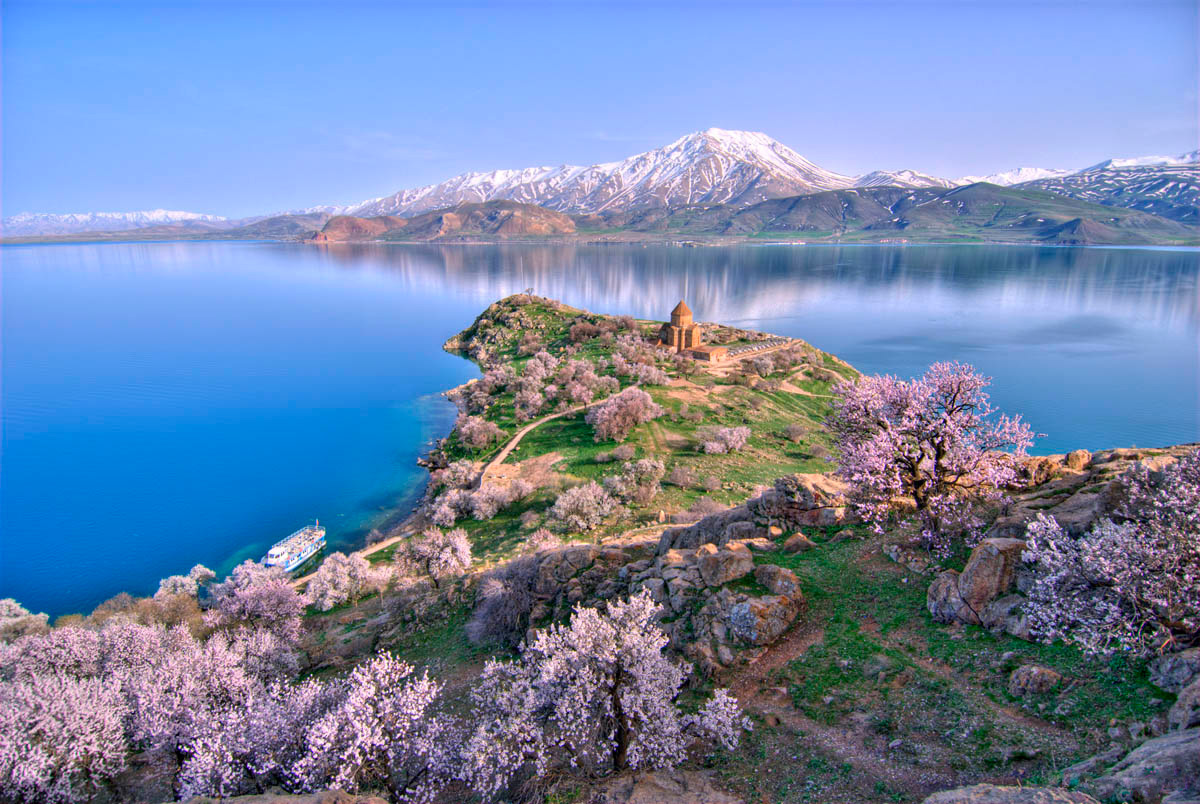
- Akhtamar Island on Lake Van with the Armenian Cathedral of the Holy Cross

- Location of the province within Turkey
- Coordinates: 38°29′57″N 43°40′13″E
- Country: Turkey
- Seat: Van

Government
  - Governor: Ozan Balcı
- Area: 20,921 km^{2} (8,078 sq mi)
- Population (2022): 1,128,749
  - Density: 53.953/km^{2} (139.74/sq mi)
- Time zone: UTC+3 (TRT)
- Area code: 0432
- ISO code: TR-77

Van Province (Turkish: Van ili, Kurdish: Parezgêha Wanê, Armenian: Վանի մարզ) is a province and metropolitan municipality in the Eastern Anatolian region of Turkey, between Lake Van and the Iranian border. Its area is 20,921 km^{2}, and its population is 1,128,749 (2022). Its adjacent provinces are Bitlis to the west, Siirt to the southwest, Şırnak and Hakkâri to the south, and Ağrı to the north. The capital of the province is the city of Van, with a population of 525,016 as of 2022. The second-largest city is Erciş, with 92,945 inhabitants in 2022. The province was part of ancient province of Vaspurakan and is considered to be one of the cradles of Armenian civilization. Before the Armenian genocide, Van Province was one of the six Armenian vilayets. A majority of the population of the province is Kurdish, and it is considered part of Turkish Kurdistan.

== Demographics ==
Historical population composition of Van by groups
Year	Armenians	Muslims	Others	Total
1881–1882	52.1%	47.9%	0%	113,964
1914	35.7%	63.6%	0.7%	172,171

Today, the province is mainly populated by Kurds and considered part of Turkish Kurdistan. (Note: "...Turkish Kurdistān numbers at least 17 of them almost totally: in the north-east, the provinces of Erzincan, Erzurum and Kars; in the centre, going from west to east and from north to south, the provinces of Malatya, Tunceli, Elaziğ, Bingöl, Mus, Karaköse (Ağri), then Adiyaman, Diyarbakir, Siirt, Bitlis and Van...) The province had a significant Christian Armenian population until the genocide in 1915.

In the 1881–1882 Ottoman census, the sanjak of Van had a population of 113,964 of which 52.1% was Armenian and 47.9% Muslim. In the 1914 census, the sanjak had a population of 172,171 of which 63.6% was Muslim and 35.7% Armenian. The remaining population was Assyrians at 0.7%.

In the first Turkish census in 1927, Kurdish was the most-spoken first language in Van Province (which included Hakkari Province until 1945) at 76.6% while Turkish remained the second most-spoken first language at 23.1%. Other languages enumerated included Hebrew at 0.2% and Arabic at 0.1%. In the same census, Muslims comprised 99.8% of the population and the remaining 0.2% being Jews.

In the subsequent census in 1935, Kurdish stood at 72.4% and Turkish at 27.2%. Other smaller languages included Circassian at 0.2%, Hebrew at 0.1%, Arabic at 0.1%.

Muslims remained the largest denomination at 99.8%, Jews stood at 0.1% and Christians at 0.1%. In 1945, Kurdish stood at 59.9% and Turkish at 39.6%, while 99.9% of the population was Muslim. In 1955, Kurdish and Turkish remained the two most spoken languages at 66.4% and 33.1%, respectively.

== History ==
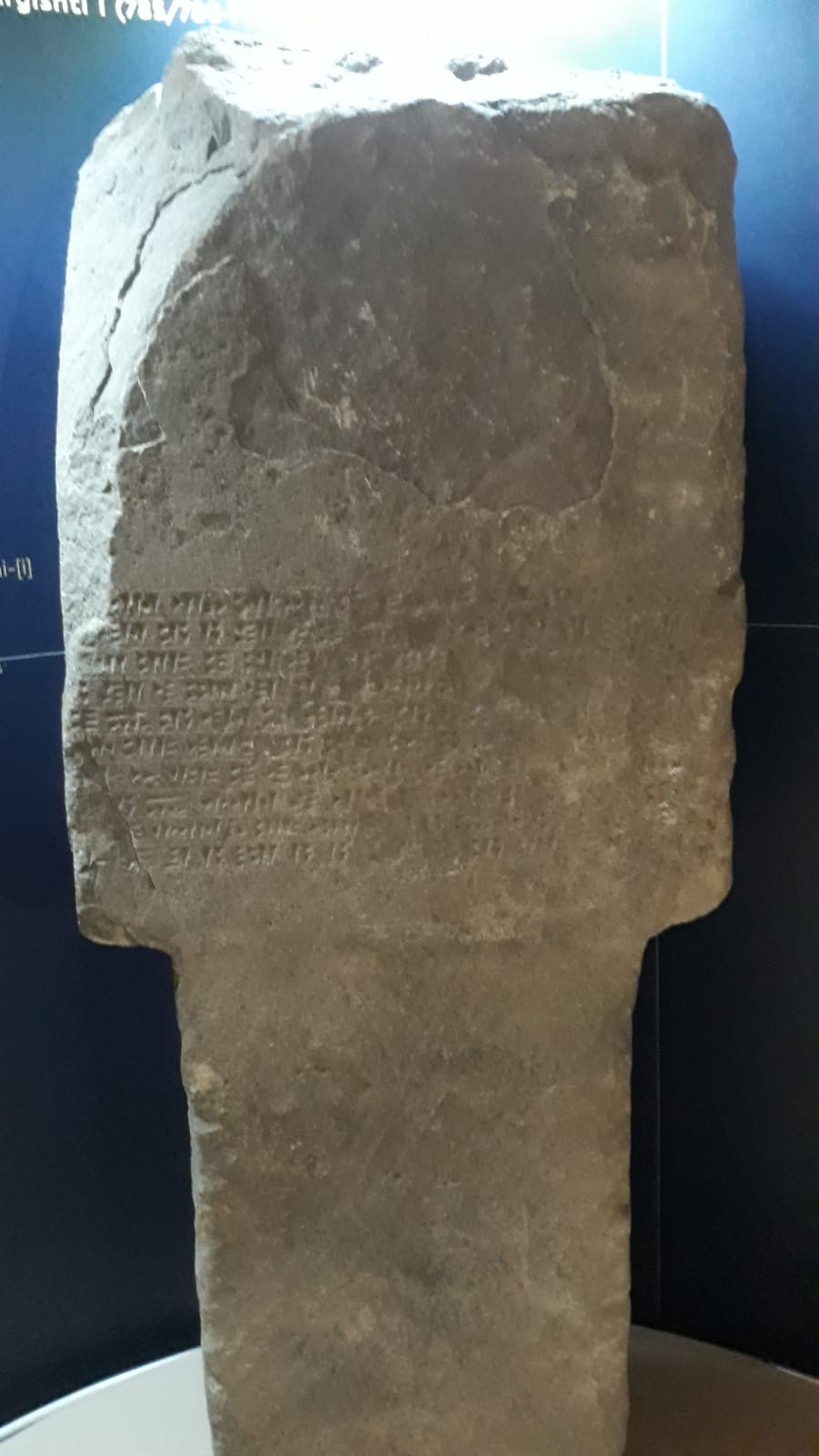
Arinçkus Argishti I Stele belonging to the Urartian King Argishti I, dated between 785 BC and 756 BC, Bitlis Ahlat Museum

This area was the heartland of Armenians, who lived in these areas from the time of Hayk in the 3rd millennium BCE right up to the late 19th century. In the 9th century BC the Van area was the center of the Urartian kingdom. The area was a major Armenian population center. The region came under the control of the Armenian Orontids in the 7th century BC and later Persians in the mid-6th century BC. By the early 2nd century BC it was part of the Kingdom of Armenia. It became an important center during the reign of the Armenian king, Tigranes II, who founded the city of Tigranakert in the 1st century BC.

=== Seljuks and Ottomans ===
With the victory of the Seljuk Turks at the Battle of Malazgirt in 1071, just north of Lake Van, it became a part of the Seljuq Empire and later the Ottoman Empire during their century long wars with their neighboring Iranian Safavid arch rivals, in which Sultan Selim I managed to conquer the area over the latter. The area continued to be contested and was passed on between the Ottoman Empire and the Safavids (and their subsequent successors, the Afsharids and Qajars) for many centuries until the Battle of Chaldiran which set the borders till this day. During the 19th century it was reorganized as Van Vilayet.

=== Republic of Turkey ===
In 1927 the office of the Inspector General was created, which governed with martial law. The province was included in the first Inspectorate General (Umumi Müfettişlik, UM) over which the Inspector General ruled. The UM span over the provinces of Hakkâri, Siirt, Van, Mardin, Bitlis, Sanlıurfa, Elaziğ and Diyarbakır. The Inspectorate General were dissolved in 1952 during the Government of the Democrat Party.

Between July 1987 and July 2000, Van Province was within the OHAL region, which was ruled by a Governor within a state of emergency.

==== Modern history ====
According to the 2012 Metropolitan Municipalities Law (Law No. 6360), all Turkish provinces with a population more than 750 000, will have a metropolitan municipality and the districts within the metropolitan municipalities will be second level municipalities. The law also creates new districts within the provinces in addition to present districts. The current governor is Mehmet Emin Bilmez.

== Earthquakes ==
Several earthquakes have occurred in Van Province. In 1881 an earthquake occurred and caused the death of 95 people. In 1941, Van suffered a destructive 5.9 M_{w} earthquake. Two more earthquakes occurred in 2011 in which 644 people died and 2608 people were injured. In a 7.2 M_{w} earthquake on 23 October 2011, more than 500 people were killed. On 9 November 2011, a 5.6 M_{w} magnitude earthquake killed also several people and caused buildings to collapse.

== Districts ==
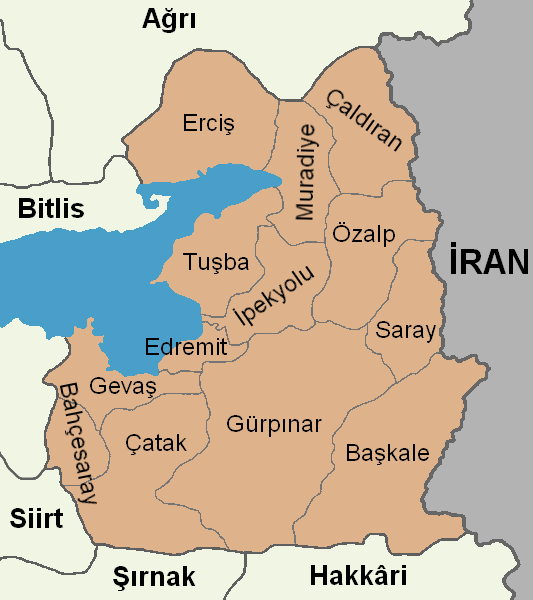

Van Province is divided into 13 districts, listed below with their populations as at the end of 2022. In 2013, the former Van District was split into İpekyolu and Tuşba districts, which among them contain almost all of the city of Van.

- Bahçesaray (13,495)
- Başkale (44,168)
- Çaldıran (58,635)
- Çatak (18,462)
- Edremit (127,819)
- Erciş (171,000)
- Gevaş (26,918)
- Gürpınar (31,865)
- İpekyolu (348,046)
- Muradiye (45,718)
- Özalp (59,851)
- Saray (19,471)
- Tuşba (163,301)

== Geology and geomorphology ==
=== Lakes ===
The main lakes in Van province are Lake Turna, Lake Gövelek, Lake Hıdırmenteş, Lake Akgöl, Lake Erçek and Lake Süphan.

=== Mountains and calderas ===
The main mountains in the province are Kavuşşahap Mountains, Mount Artos, Mount Erek, Mount Tendürek, Mount Meydan and Girekol.

== Tourism ==
The main places with tourism potential in Van are Hoşap Castle, Muradiye Fall, Akdamar Island, Van Castle, Lake Turna, Lake Akgöl and Van Museum.

== Gallery ==
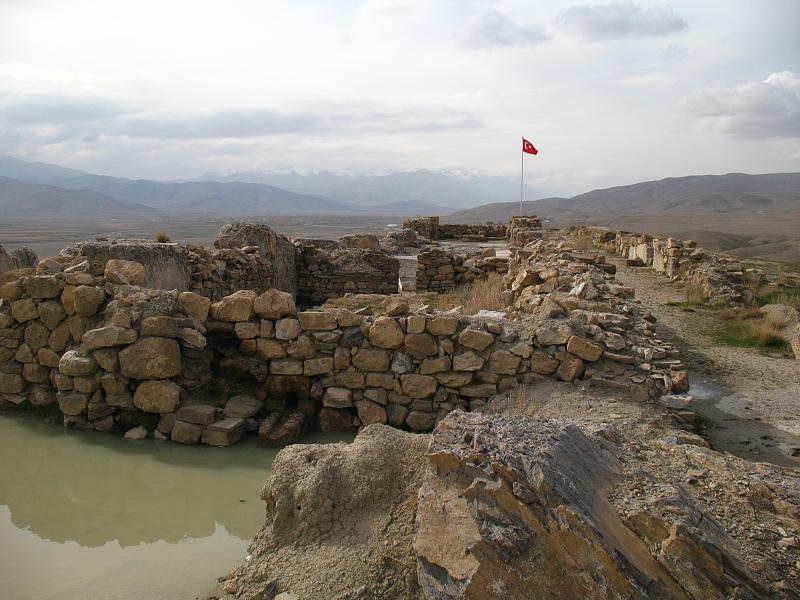
Haykaberd or Çavuştepe

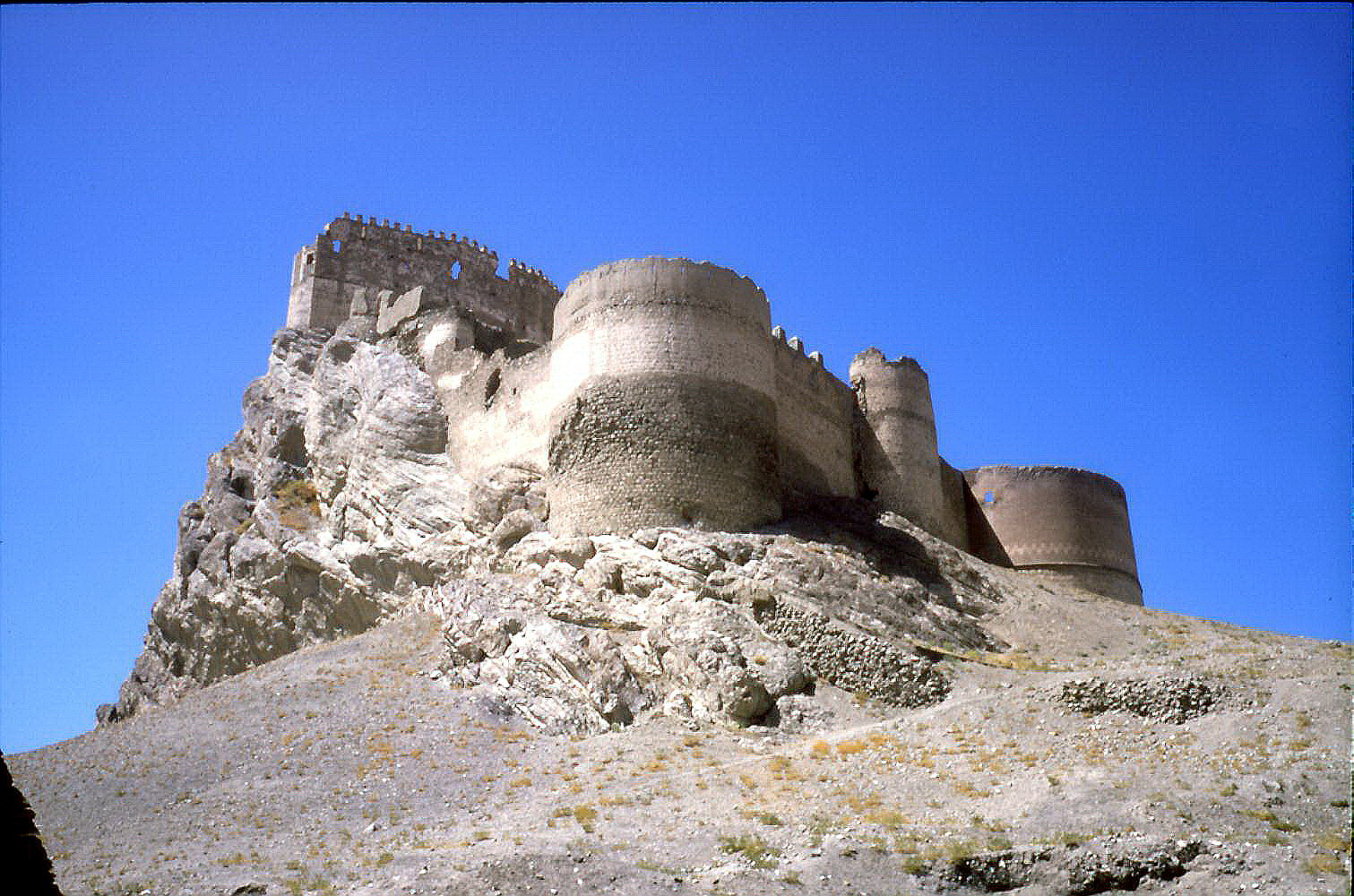
Hoşap Castle

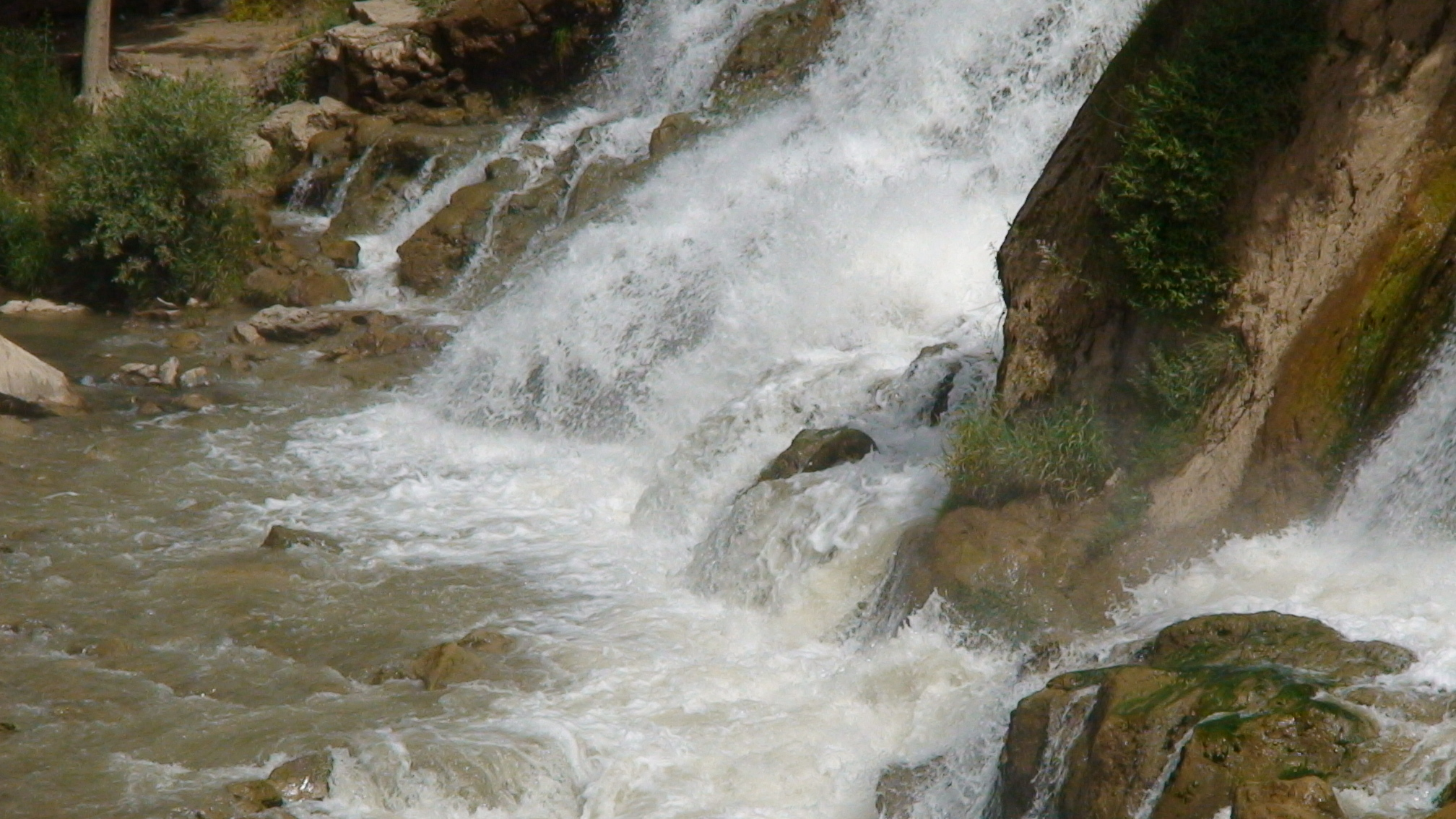
Muradiye Fall
Medieval Armenian monasteries in the Van Province

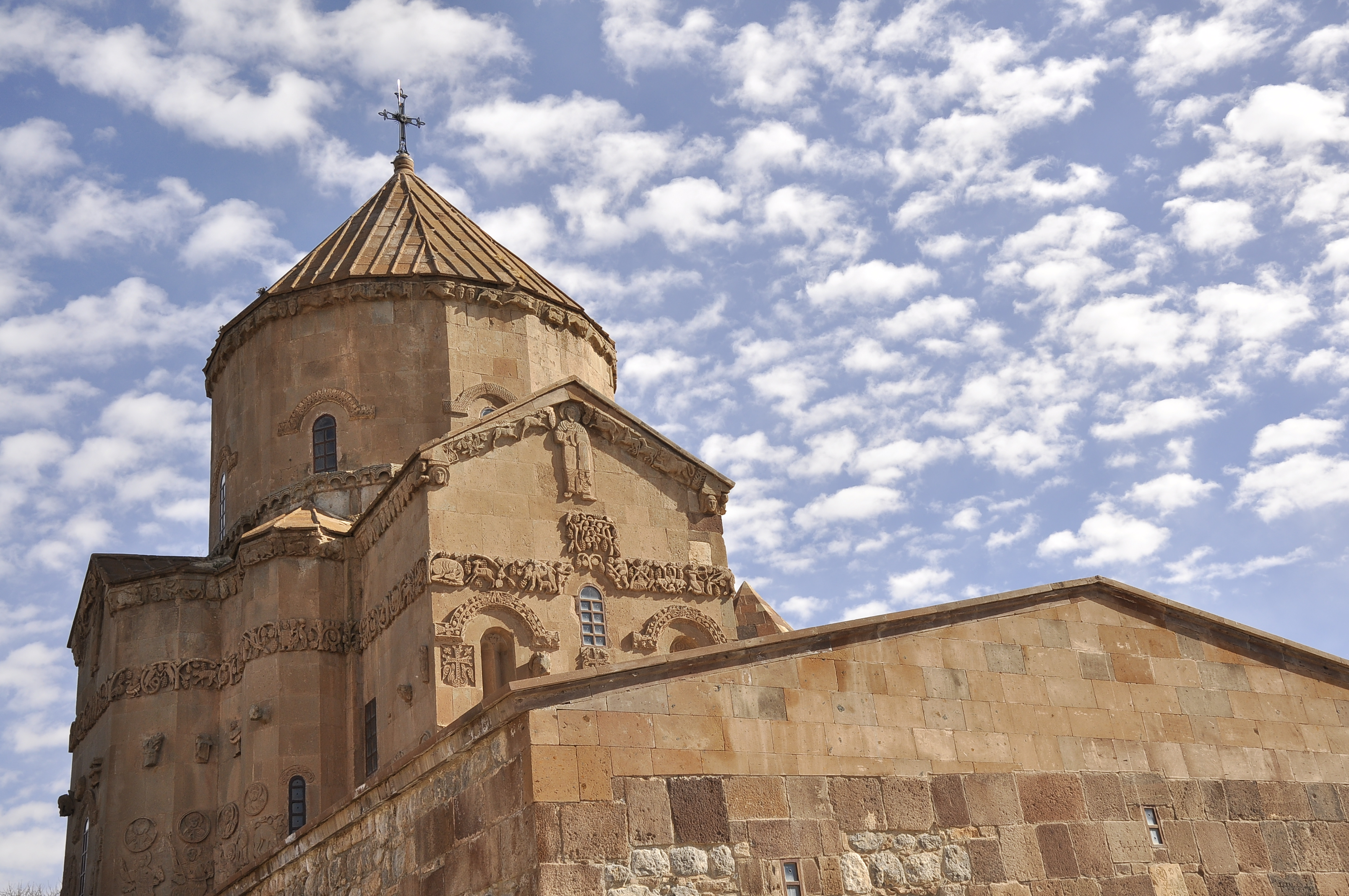
The Armenian Cathedral of the Holy Cross (10th century) on Akdamar Island

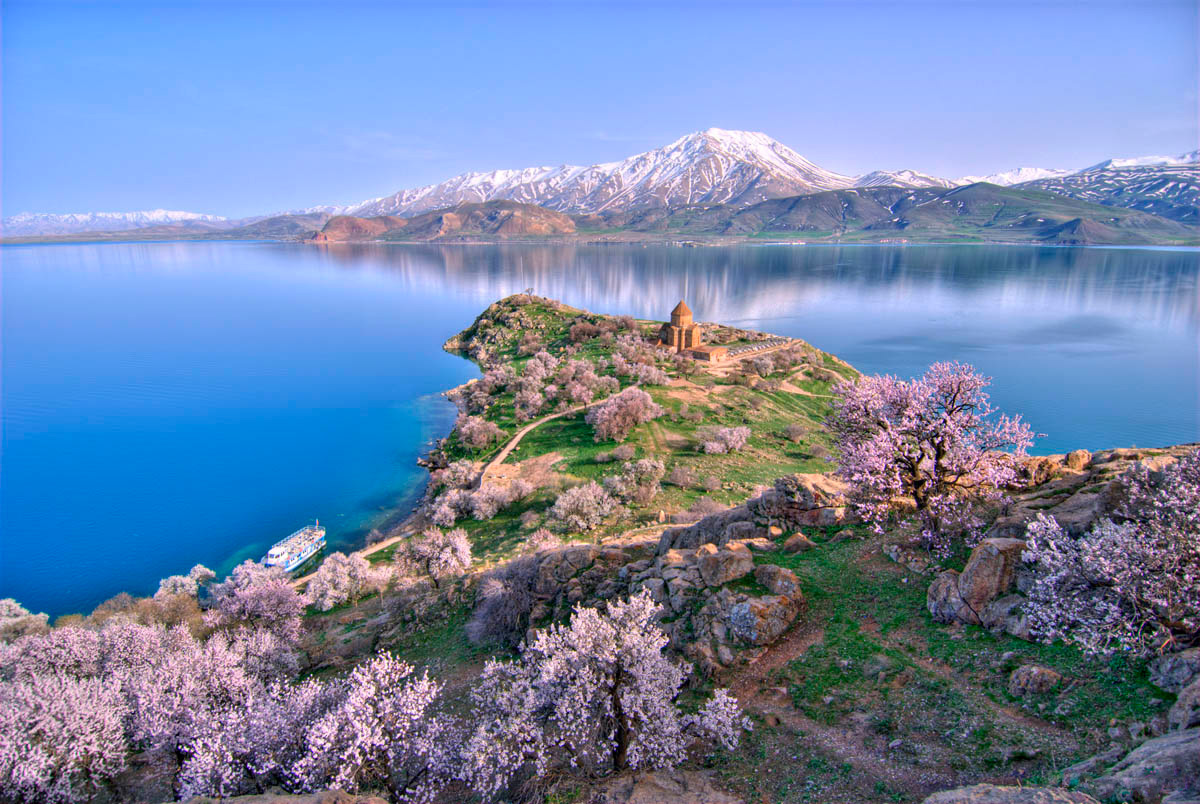
Akhtamar Island on Lake Van

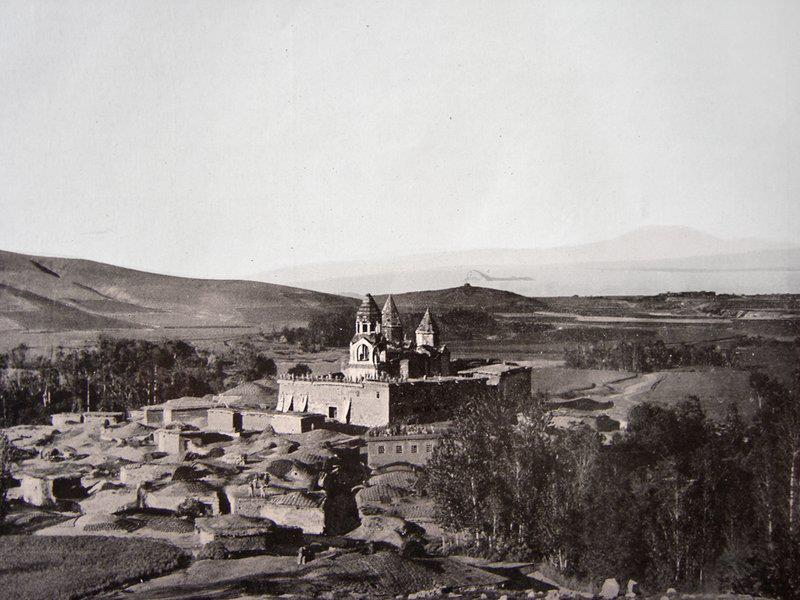
The Armenian Monastery of Narek (10th century)

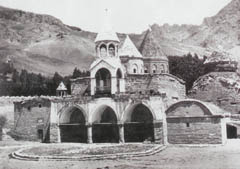
Varagavank Armenian monastery (11th century)

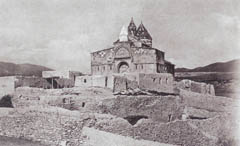
The Armenian Monastery of Saint Bartholomew (13th century)
Islamic monuments in the Van Province

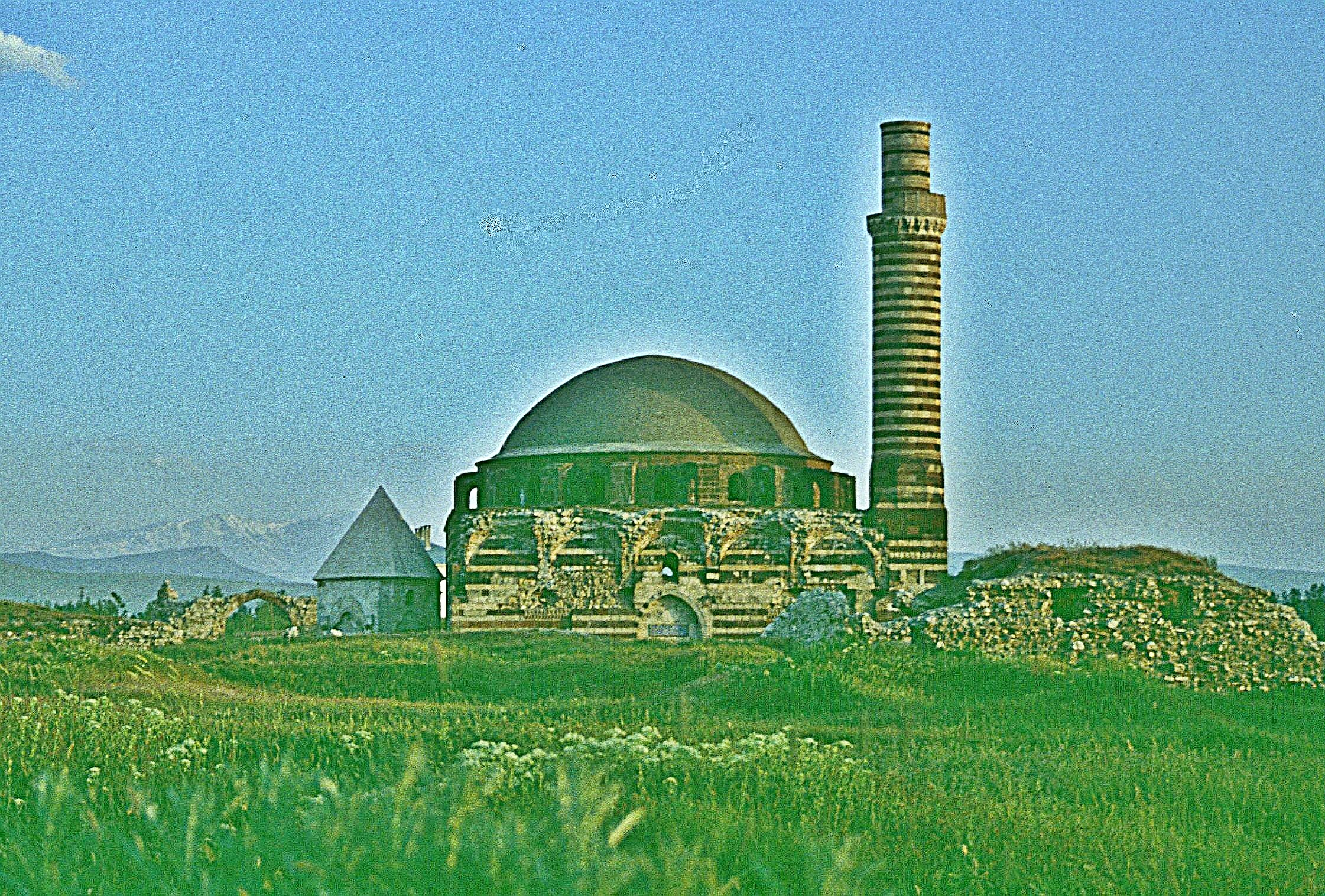
Ruined Ottoman mosque in the old ruined part of Van city (16th century)

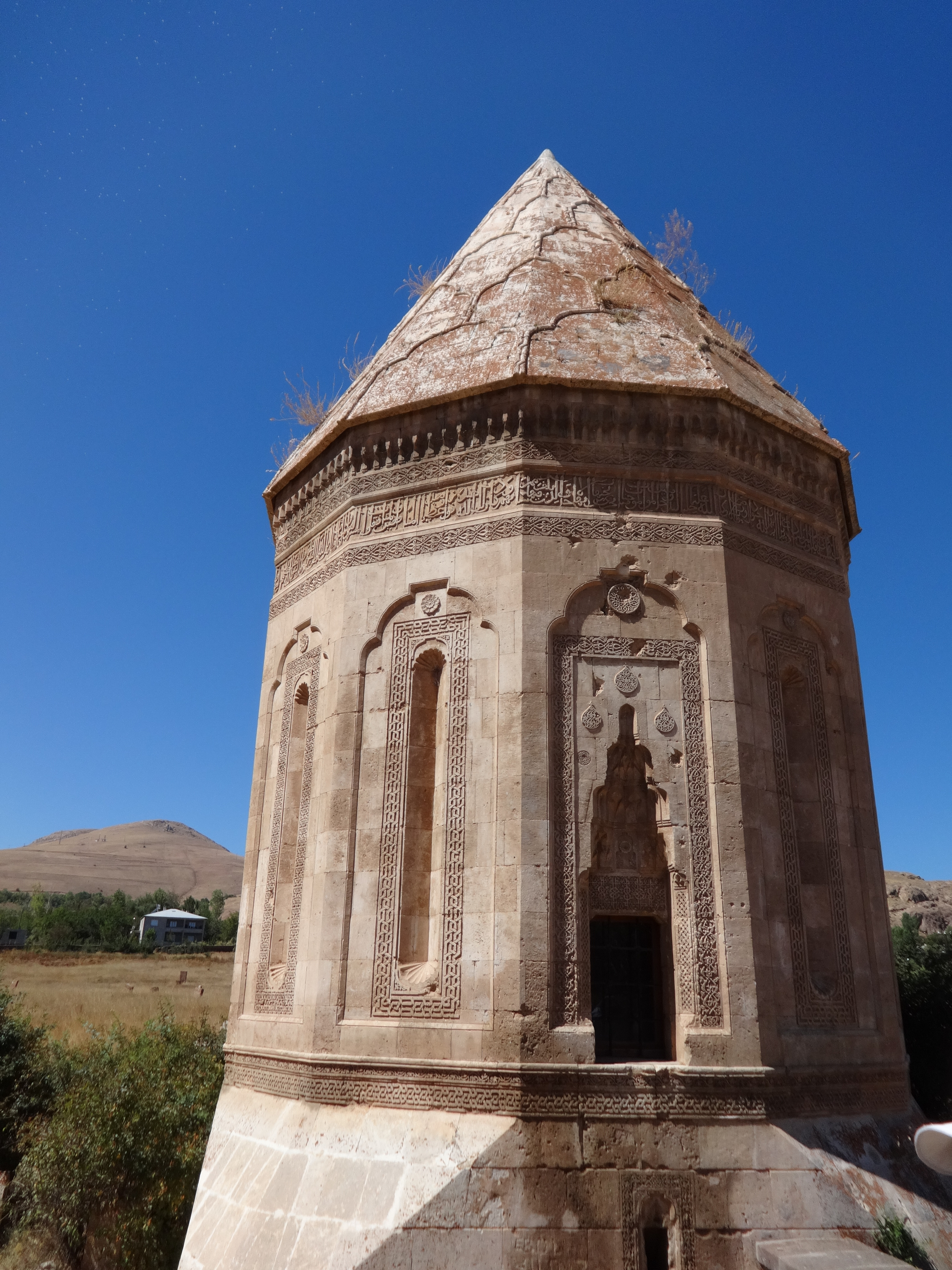
Tomb of Halime Hatun in Gevaş (14th century)

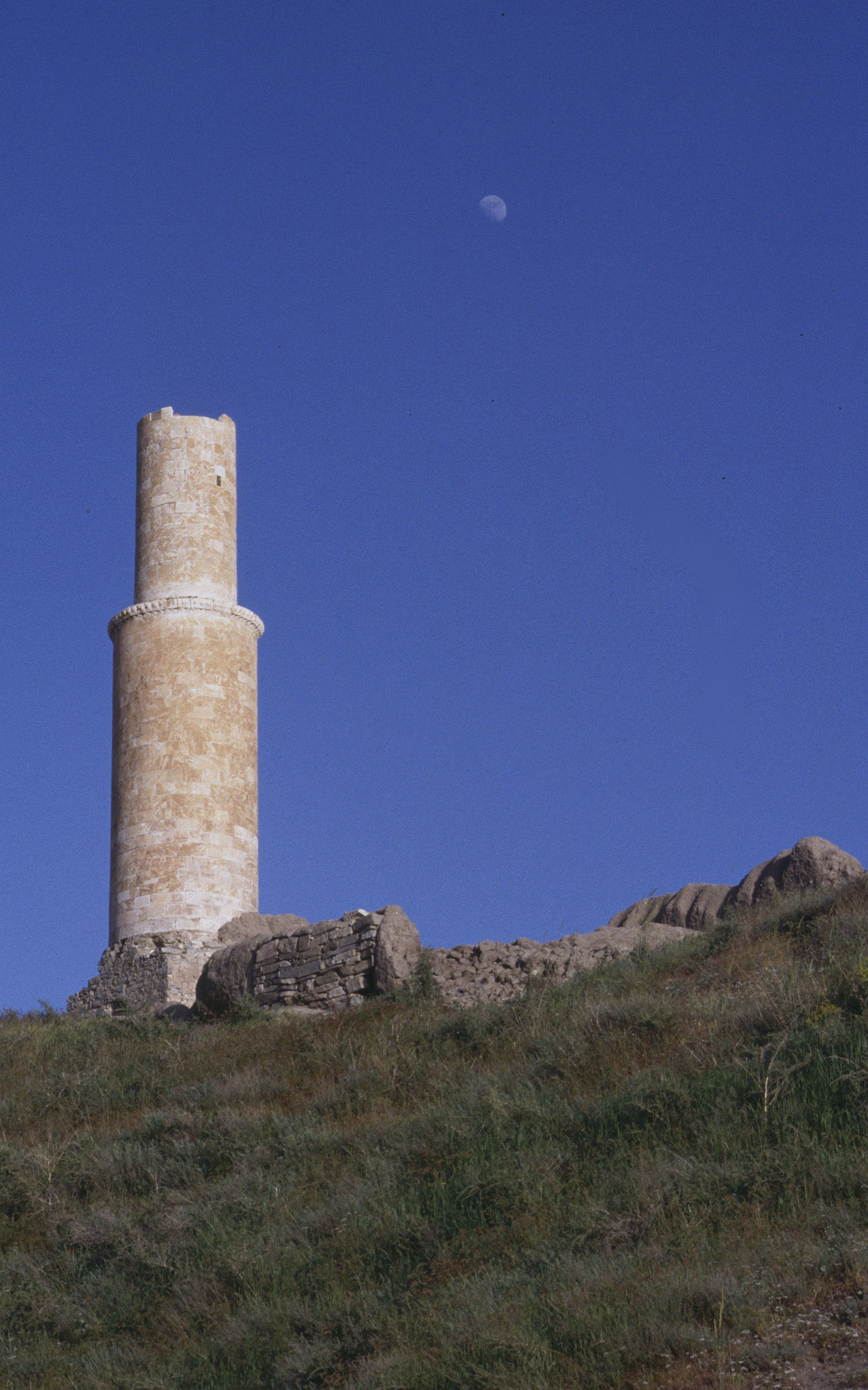
Ruined Ottoman mosque minaret in the old part of Van city

== See also ==
- 2011 Van earthquake
- 2020 Van avalanches
- Defense of Van (1915)
- Ottoman Armenian population
- Yazidis

== General and cited references ==
- Bayir, Derya (2016). Minorities and Nationalism in Turkish Law. Routledge. ISBN 978-1-317-09579-8.
- Edmonds, C. J. (2002). "Kurds, Kurdistān". In Bois, Th; Minorsky, V.; MacKenzie, D. N. (eds.). Encyclopaedia of Islam (2nd ed.). BRILL. ISBN 9789004161214.
- Celiker, Anna Grabolle (2015). Kurdish Life in Contemporary Turkey: Migration, Gender and Ethnic Identity. Bloomsbury Publishing. ISBN 9780857725974.
- Dündar, Fuat (2000). Türkiye nüfus sayımlarında azınlıklar (in Turkish). ISBN 9789758086771.
- Fleet, Kate; Kunt, I. Metin; Kasaba, Reşat; Faroqhi, Suraiya (2008). The Cambridge History of Turkey. Cambridge University Press. ISBN 978-0-521-62096-3.
- Hofmann, Tessa, ed. (2004). Verfolgung, Vertreibung und Vernichtung der Christen im Osmanischen Reich 1912-1922 [Persecution, Expulsion and Annihilation of the Christian Population in the Ottoman Empire 1912-1922]. Münster: LIT. ISBN 3-8258-7823-6.
- Hovannisian, Richard G. (1999). Armenian Van/Vaspurakan. Costa Mesa, California: Mazda Publishers. ISBN 1-56859-130-6.
- Jongerden, Joost (2007). The Settlement Issue in Turkey and the Kurds: An Analysis of Spatical Policies, Modernity and War. Brill. ISBN 978-90-04-15557-2.
- Karpat, Kemal (1978). "Ottoman Population Records and the Census of 1881/82-1893". International Journal of Middle East Studies. 9 (3): 272. doi:10.1017/S0020743800000088. JSTOR 162764. S2CID 162337621.
- Karpat, Kemal (1985). Ottoman Population 1830-1914. The University of Wisconsin Press. ISBN 9780299091606.
- Myhill, John (2006). Language, Religion and National Identity in Europe and the Middle East: A historical study. Amsterdam: J. Benjamins. ISBN 978-90-272-9351-0.
- Soysal, İsmail (1983). Türkiye'nin Siyasal Andlaşmaları, (1920-1945). Vol. 1. Türk Tarih Kurumu.
- Verheij, Jelle (2012). Jongerden, Joost; Verheij, Jelle (eds.). Social Relations in Ottoman Diyarbekir, 1870–1915. Brill. ISBN 978-90-04-22518-3.
- Watts, Nicole F. (2010). Activists in Office: Kurdish Politics and Protest in Turkey. Studies in Modernity and National Identity. Seattle: University of Washington Press. ISBN 978-0-295-99050-7.
