= Kurds in Turkey =

Ethnic group in the Republic of Turkey

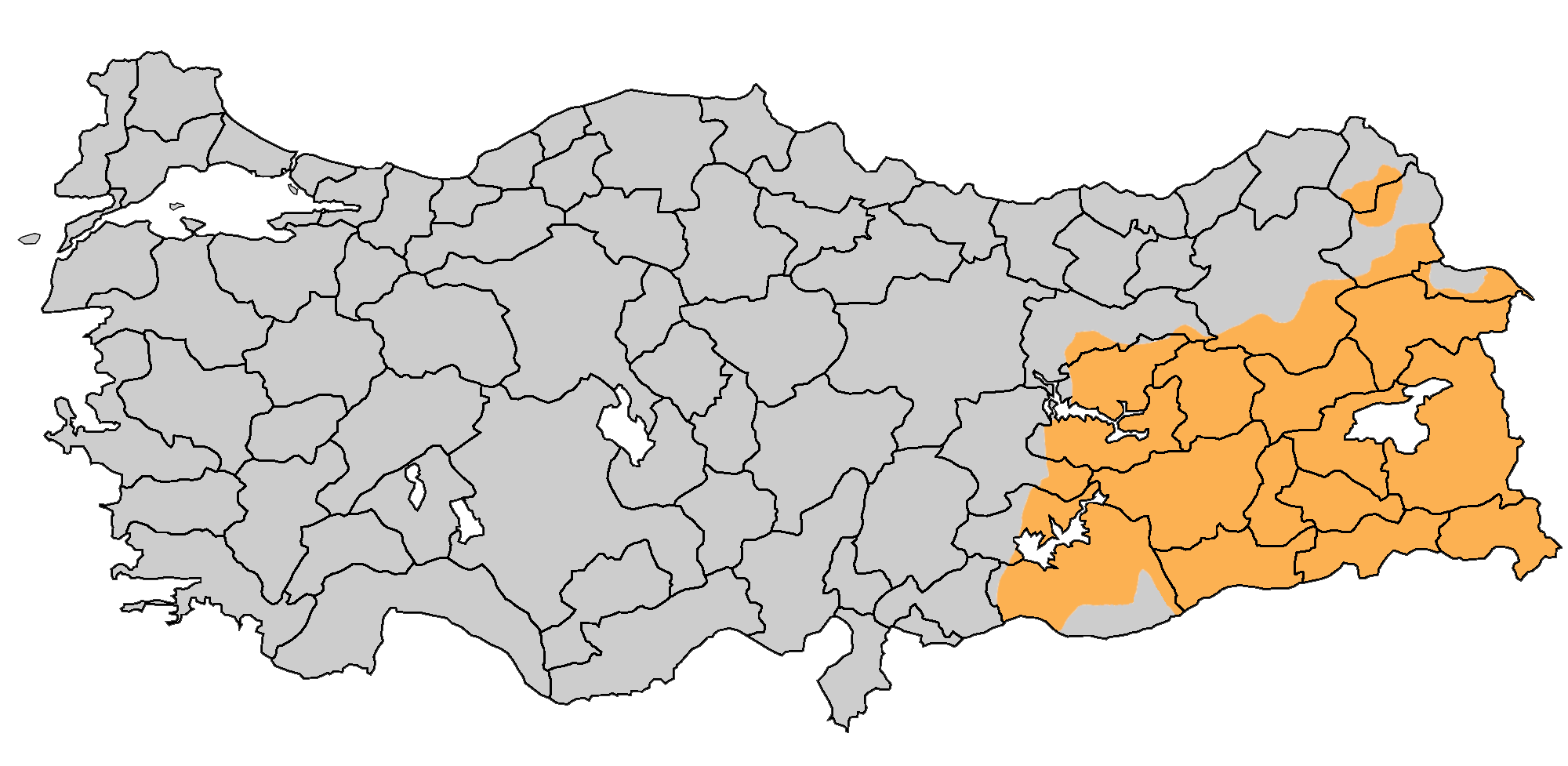
- Kurdish-majority regions of Turkey according to The World Factbook (1992)

Total population
- 13.0–14.2 million (KONDA, 2013 estimate); 15.25 million (CIA World Factbook, 2016 estimate); 20 million (Kurdish Institute of Paris, 2017 estimate); 15–25% of the population

Regions with significant populations
- Eastern and Southeastern Anatolia, Large diaspora population in Istanbul, İzmir, Adana and Mersin

Languages
- Kurdish (primarily Kurmanji); Zaza; Turkish

Religion
- Predominantly Sunni Islam, minority Alevism and Yazidism

Related ethnic groups
- Zazas and other Iranian peoples

The Kurds are the largest ethnic minority in Turkey. According to various estimates, they compose between 15% and 25% of the population of Turkey. There are Kurds living in various provinces of Turkey, but they are primarily concentrated in the east and southeast of the country within the region viewed by Kurds as Turkish Kurdistan.

During the violent suppressions of numerous Kurdish rebellions since the establishment of the Republic of Turkey in 1923, such as the Sheikh Said Rebellion, the Ararat rebellion, and the Dersim Rebellion, massacres have periodically been committed against the Kurds, with one prominent incident being the Zilan Massacre. The Turkish government categorized Kurds as "Mountain Turks" until 1991, and denied the existence of Kurds. The words "Kurds" or "Kurdistan" were banned in any language by the Turkish government, though "Kurdish" was allowed in census reports. Following the military coup of 1980, the Kurdish languages were officially prohibited in public and private life. Many people who spoke, published, or sang in Kurdish were arrested and imprisoned. In Turkey, it is illegal to use Kurdish as a language of instruction in both public and private schools. The Kurdish language is only allowed as a subject in some schools.

Since the 1980s, Kurdish movements have included both peaceful political activities for basic civil rights for Kurds in Turkey as well as armed rebellion and guerrilla warfare, including military attacks aimed mainly at Turkish military bases, demanding first a separate Kurdish state and later self-determination for the Kurds. According to a state-sponsored Turkish opinion poll, 59% of self-identified Kurds in Turkey think that Kurds in Turkey do not seek a separate state (while 71.3% of self-identified Turks think they do).

During the Kurdish–Turkish conflict, food embargoes were placed on Kurdish villages and towns. There were many instances of Kurds being forcibly expelled from their villages by Turkish security forces. Many villages were reportedly set on fire or destroyed. Throughout the 1990s and early 2000s, political parties that represented Kurdish interests were banned. In 2013, a ceasefire effectively ended the violence until June 2015, when hostilities renewed between the PKK and the Turkish government over Turkish involvement in the Syrian civil war. Violence was widely reported against ordinary Kurdish citizens and the headquarters and branches of the pro-Kurdish rights Peoples' Democratic Party were attacked by mobs.

== History ==
=== Middle Ages and early modern period ===
The Marwanid dynasty, which was of Kurdish origin, ruled a territory from Diyarbakir that included parts of Syria and Iraq from 984 to 1083. The Ayyubid dynasty, also of Kurdish origin (but identifying first and foremost as Muslims), ruled parts of Anatolia in the 12th and 13th centuries.

According to Ahmet Nezihî Turan the first Kurdish settlement in Central Anatolia was named Kürtler ("Kurds"), founded in Yaban Âbâd (present-day Kızılcahamam-Çamlıdere near Ankara) in 1463. According to Mark Sykes, the earliest population transfer (or exile) of Kurds to Central Anatolia was carried out during the reign of Selim I (1512–20).

The Boz Ulus Kanunnamesi enacted in 1540 recognizes ethnic and social differences of the Muslim communities under the Ottoman rule, which characterizes the Turkmen nomadic tribes as Boz Ulus (grey nation) and the Kurdish nomadic tribes as Kara Ulus (black nation).

The Mahmudi or "Pinyanişi" was an Ottoman-Kurdish tribe in the Lake Van region, who according to Evliya Çelebi had 60,000 warriors. Their chief, Sarı Süleyman Bey, strengthened the Hoşap Castle in the Lake Van region, in 1643.

=== 19th century ===
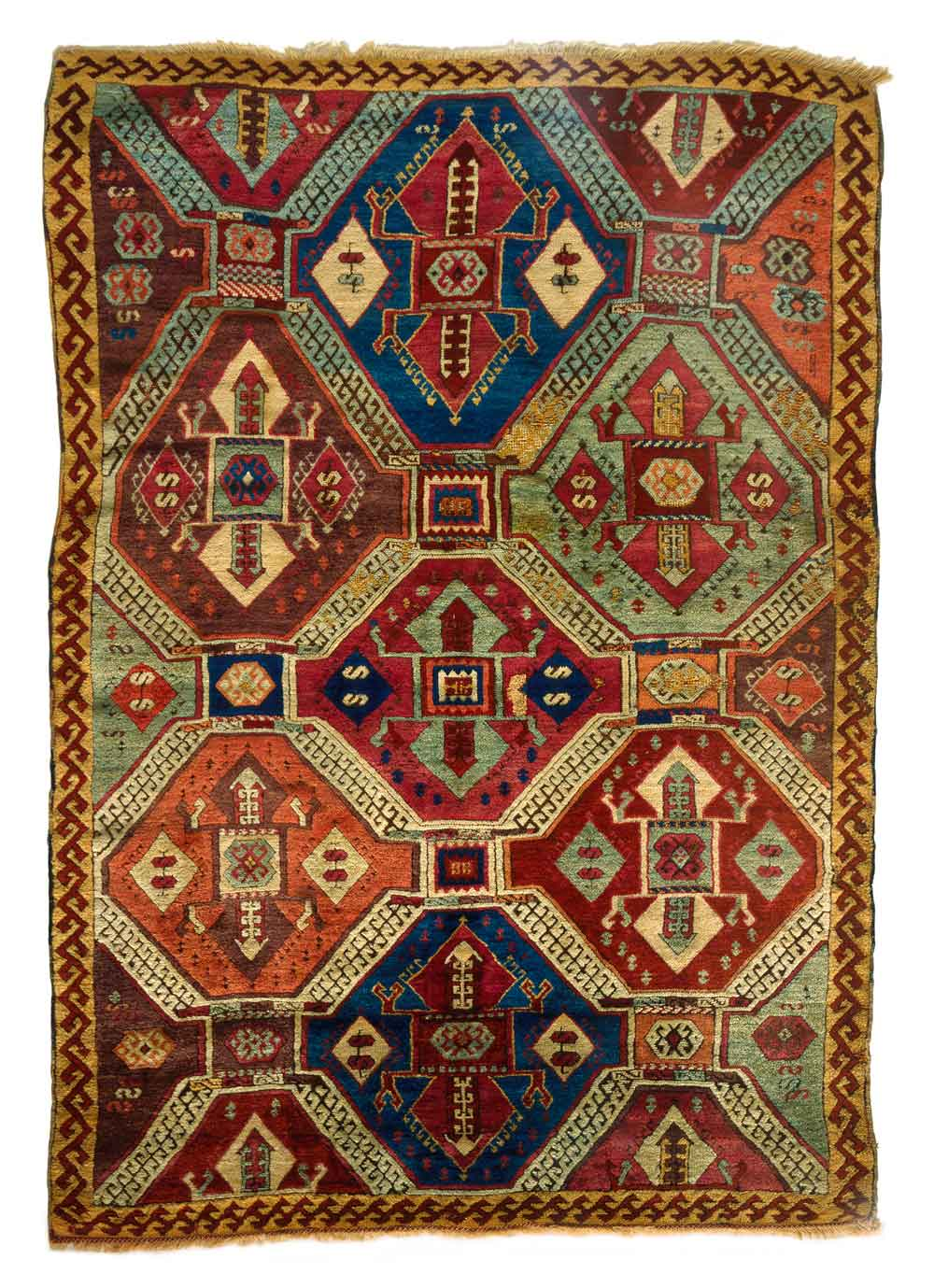
Kurdish Anatolian carpet, early 19th century.

After ca. 1800, the Cihanbeyli, Reşwan and Şêxbizin tribes migrated into central Anatolia from the east and southeast. The total Kurdish population in Turkey was estimated at 1.5 million in the 1880s, many of whom were nomadic or pastoral.

=== 20th century ===
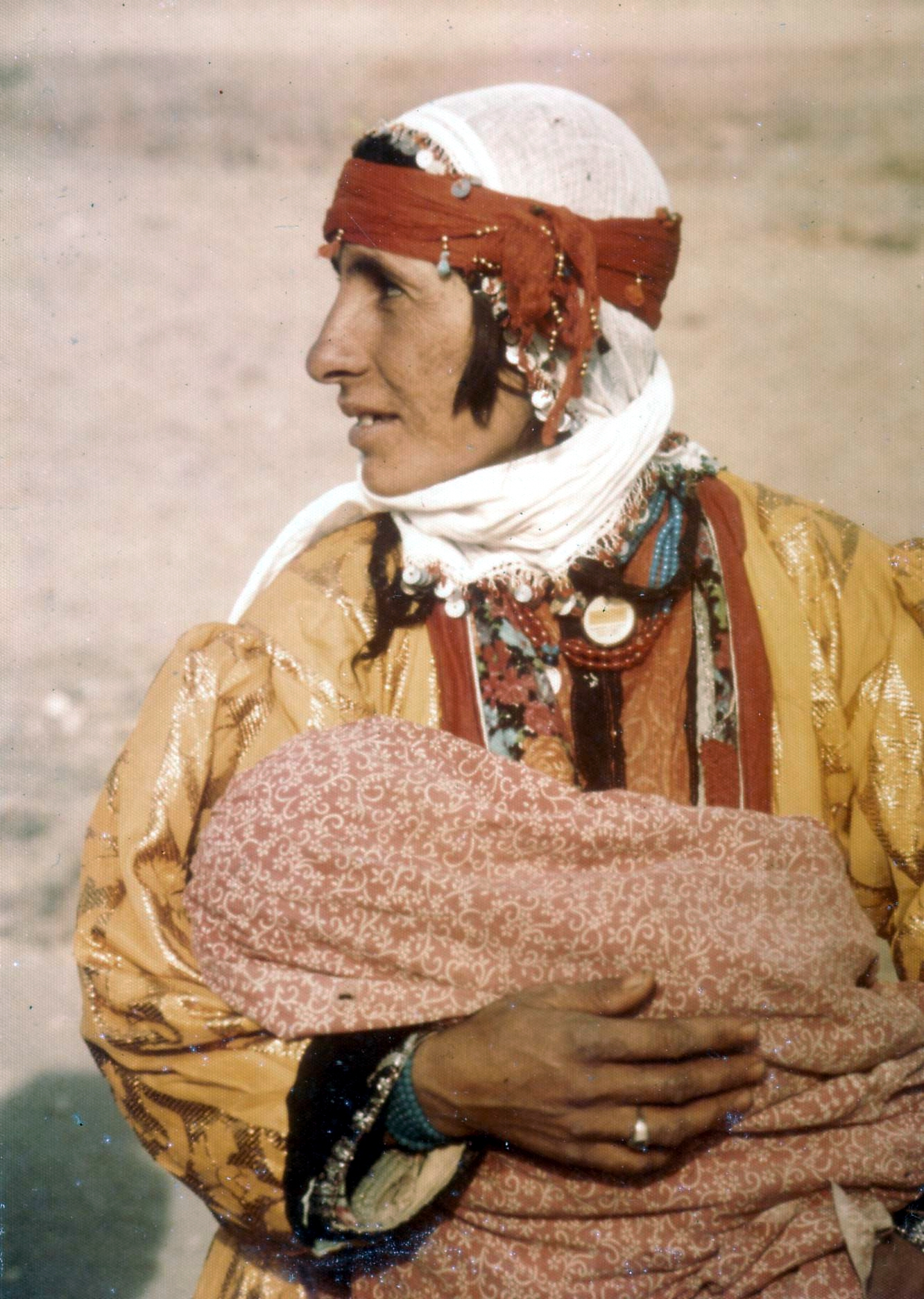
Kurdish mother and child, Van, Turkey. 1973

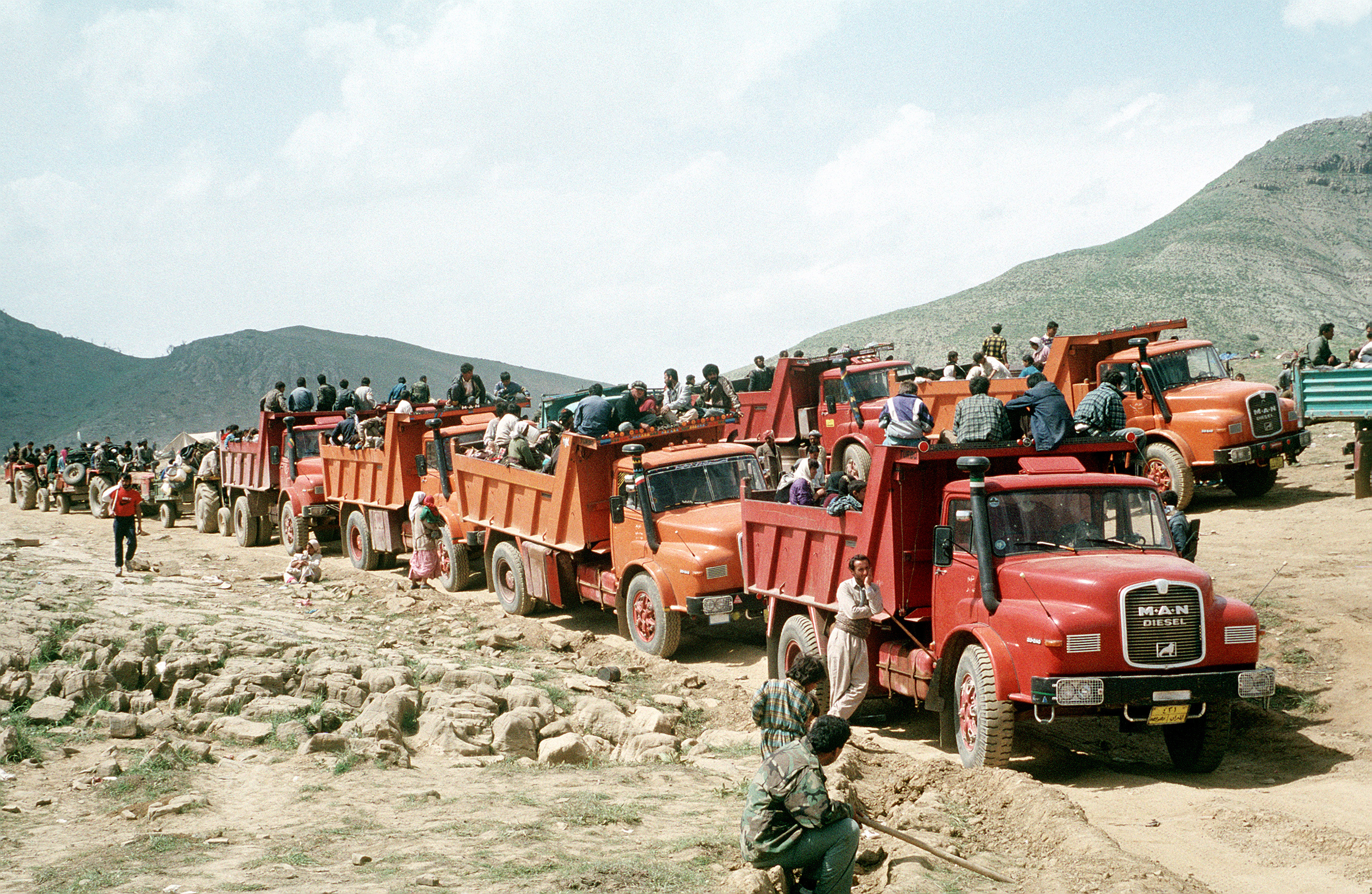
Iraqi Kurds fleeing to Turkey in April 1991, during the Gulf War

Before the foundation of Turkey, the Kurds were recognized as their own nation. The Turkish leader Mustafa Kemal also recognized the Kurds as a nation at the time and stated that provinces in which the Kurds lived shall be granted autonomy. After the establishment of the Republic of Turkey, which ended the caliphates and sultanate in Turkey, there have been several Kurdish rebellions since the 1920s: Koçkiri Rebellion, Beytüşşebab rebellion, Sheikh Said Rebellion, Dersim Rebellion, Ararat rebellion. The policy towards the Kurds changed most prominently in 1924, as the new constitution denied the Kurds autonomy. The Kurdish people and their language were soon oppressed by the Turkish Government, as the Turkish Constitution of 1924 prohibited the use of Kurdish in public places, and a law was issued which enabled the expropriation of the Kurdish landowners and the delivery of the land to Turkish speaking people. Through the Turkish History Thesis, Kurds were classified as being of Turanian origin, having migrated from Central Asia 5000 years ago. Hence, a Kurdish nation was denied and Kurds were called Mountain Turks. From 1927 on, a General Inspector ruled over the First Inspectorate General through the implementation of emergency decrees and martial law. The areas around Hakkari, Mardin, Siirt, Urfa, Van, Elaziğ and Diyarbakır were under his rule until 1952, when the government of the Democratic Party brought a new approach towards the Kurds and closed the General Inspectorates.

Referring to the main policy document in this context, the 1934 law on resettlement, a policy targeting the region of Dersim as one of its first test cases, with disastrous consequences for the local population. The aim or the law was to spread the population with non-Turkish culture in to different areas than their origin, and to settle people who were willing to adhere to the Turkish culture in the formerly non-Turkish areas. The Fourth Inspectorate General was created in January 1936 in the Dersim region and the Kurdish language and culture were forbidden. The Dersim massacre is often confused with the Dersim Rebellion that took place during these events. In 1937–38, approximately 10,000-15,000 Alevis and Kurds were killed and thousands went into exile. A key component of the Turkification process was the policy of massive population resettlement.

After the 1960 coup, the State Planning Organization (Turkish: Devlet Planlama Teşkilatı, DPT) was established under the Prime Ministry to solve the problem of Kurdish separatism and underdevelopment. In 1961, the DPT prepared a report titled "The principles of the state's development plan for the east and southeast" (Turkish: Devletin Doğu ve Güneydoğu'da uygulayacağı kalkınma programının esasları), shortened to "Eastern Report". It proposed to defuse separatism by encouraging ethnic mixing through migration (to and from the Southeast). This was not unlike the policies pursued by the Committee of Union and Progress under the Ottoman Empire. The Minister of Labor of the time, Bülent Ecevit of partial Kurdish ancestry, was critical of the report. From the establishment of the Inspectorate Generals until 1965, South East Turkey, was a forbidden area for foreigners.

During the 1970s, the separatist movement coalesced into the Kurdish–Turkish conflict. From 1984 to 1999, the Turkish military was embroiled in a conflict with the PKK. The village guard system was set up and armed by the Turkish state around 1984 to combat the PKK. The militia comprises local Kurds and it has around 58,000 members. Some of the village guards are fiercely loyal to the Turkish state, leading to infighting among Kurdish militants.

Due to the clashes between Turkish Army and the PKK the countryside in the southeast was depopulated, with Kurdish civilians moving to local defensible centers such as Diyarbakır, Van, and Şırnak, as well as to the cities of western Turkey and even to western Europe. The causes of the depopulation included the Turkish state's military operations against Kurdish population, some PKK atrocities against Kurdish clans they could not control and the poverty of the southeast. In the 1990s, hope for an end to the conflict emerged, as the PKK has declared several ceasefires and the political society has organized several campaigns to facilitate a reconciliation.

"Evacuations were unlawful and violent. Security forces would surround a village using helicopters, armored vehicles, troops, and village guards, and burn stored produce, agricultural equipment, crops, orchards, forests, and livestock. They set fire to houses, often giving the inhabitants no opportunity to retrieve their possessions. During the course of such operations, security forces frequently abused and humiliated villagers, stole their property and cash, and ill-treated or tortured them before herding them onto the roads and away from their former homes. The operations were marked by scores of "disappearances" and extrajudicial executions. By the mid-1990s, more than 3,000 villages had been virtually wiped from the map, and, according to official figures, 378,335 Kurdish villagers had been displaced and left homeless."

=== 21st century ===
In 2009, under the lead of Interior Minister Beşir Atalay, a short-lived peace process was started, but was not supported by the Republican Peoples Party (CHP) and Nationalist Movement Party (MHP) over concerns over the ethnic and national unity of the state. It ended in December 2009, following an attack on Turkish soldiers by the Kurdistan Workers' Party on the 7 December and the ban of the Democratic Society Party (DTP) on the 11 December 2009. In 2010, after clashes between the PKK and the government forces in eastern and southeastern Turkey, several locations in Iraqi Kurdistan were attacked by the Turkish Air Force early in June 2010. The air attack was reported 4 days later in a news article released immediately after the attack. The tense condition has continued on the border since 2007, with both sides responding to each other's every offensive move.

Following Turkey's electoral board decision to bar prominent Kurdish candidates who had allegedly outstanding warrants or were part of ongoing investigations for PKK-links from standing in upcoming elections, violent Kurdish protests erupted on April 19, 2011, resulting in at least one casualty.

On the eve of the 2012 year (28 December), the prime minister of Turkey, Recep Tayyip Erdoğan, said that the government was conducting negotiations with jailed rebel leader Öcalan. On 21 March 2013, after months of negotiations with the Turkish Government, Abdullah Ocalan's letter to people was read both in Turkish and Kurdish during Nowruz celebrations in Diyarbakır. The letter called a cease-fire that included disarmament and withdrawal from Turkish soil and calling an end to armed struggle. The PKK announced that they would obey, stating that the year of 2013 is the year of solution either through war or through peace. On 25 April 2013, the PKK announced that it would be withdrawing all its forces within Turkey to northern Iraq.

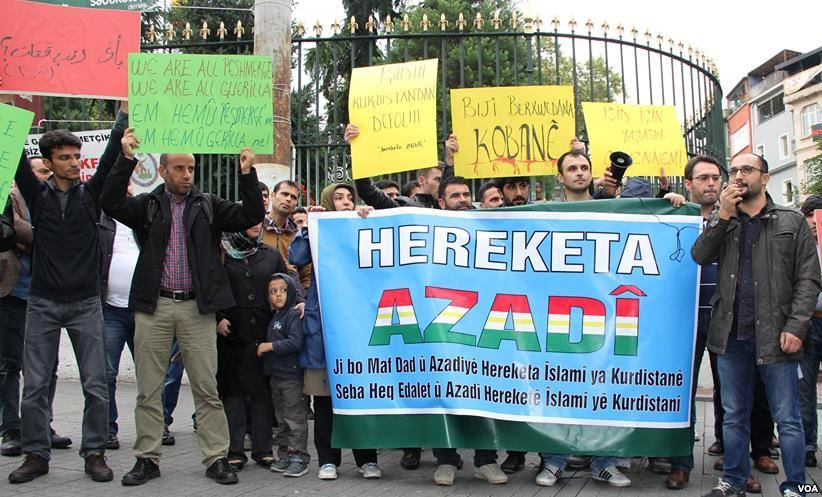
Kurds protesting the Siege of Kobanî, 29 September 2014

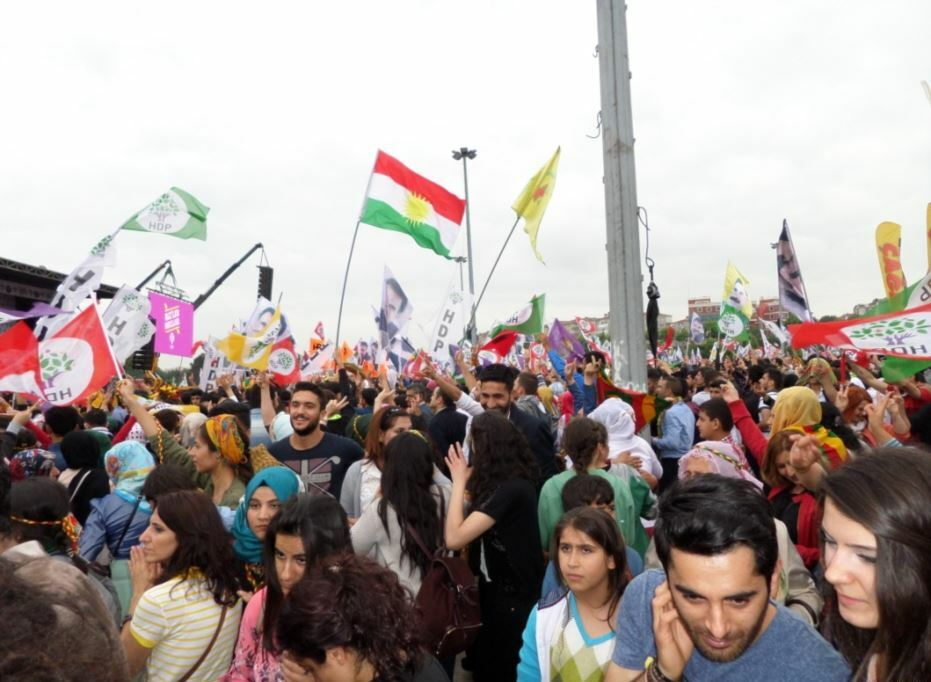
HDP supporters celebrating election results in Istanbul, 8 June 2015

On 6 and 7 October 2014, riots erupted in various cities in Turkey for protesting the Siege of Kobani. Protesters were met with tear gas and water cannons; 37 people were killed in protests. Following the July 2015 crisis (after ISIL's 2015 Suruç bombing attack on Kurdish activists), Turkey bombed alleged PKK bases in Iraq, following the PKK's unilateral decision to end the cease-fire (after many months of increasing tensions) and its suspected killing of two policeman in the town of Ceylanpınar (which the group denied carrying out). Violence soon spread throughout the country. Many Kurdish businesses were destroyed by mobs. The headquarters and branches of the pro-Kurdish rights Peoples' Democratic Party were also attacked. There are reports of civilians being killed in several Kurdish populated towns and villages. The Council of Europe raised their concerns over the attacks on civilians and the blockade of Cizre. In 2008 and also in the indictment in the Peoples' Democratic Party closure case the demand for education in Kurdish language or the teaching of the Kurdish language was equated of supporting terrorist activities by the PKK. By 2017, measures taken to curtail efforts to promote Kurdish culture within Turkey had included changing street names that honored Kurdish figures, removing statues of Kurdish heroes, and closing down television channels broadcasting in the Kurdish language. In July 2020, Turkey's Council of Higher Education banned students studying the Kurdish language and literature at Turkish universities from writing their dissertations in Kurdish.

== Politics ==
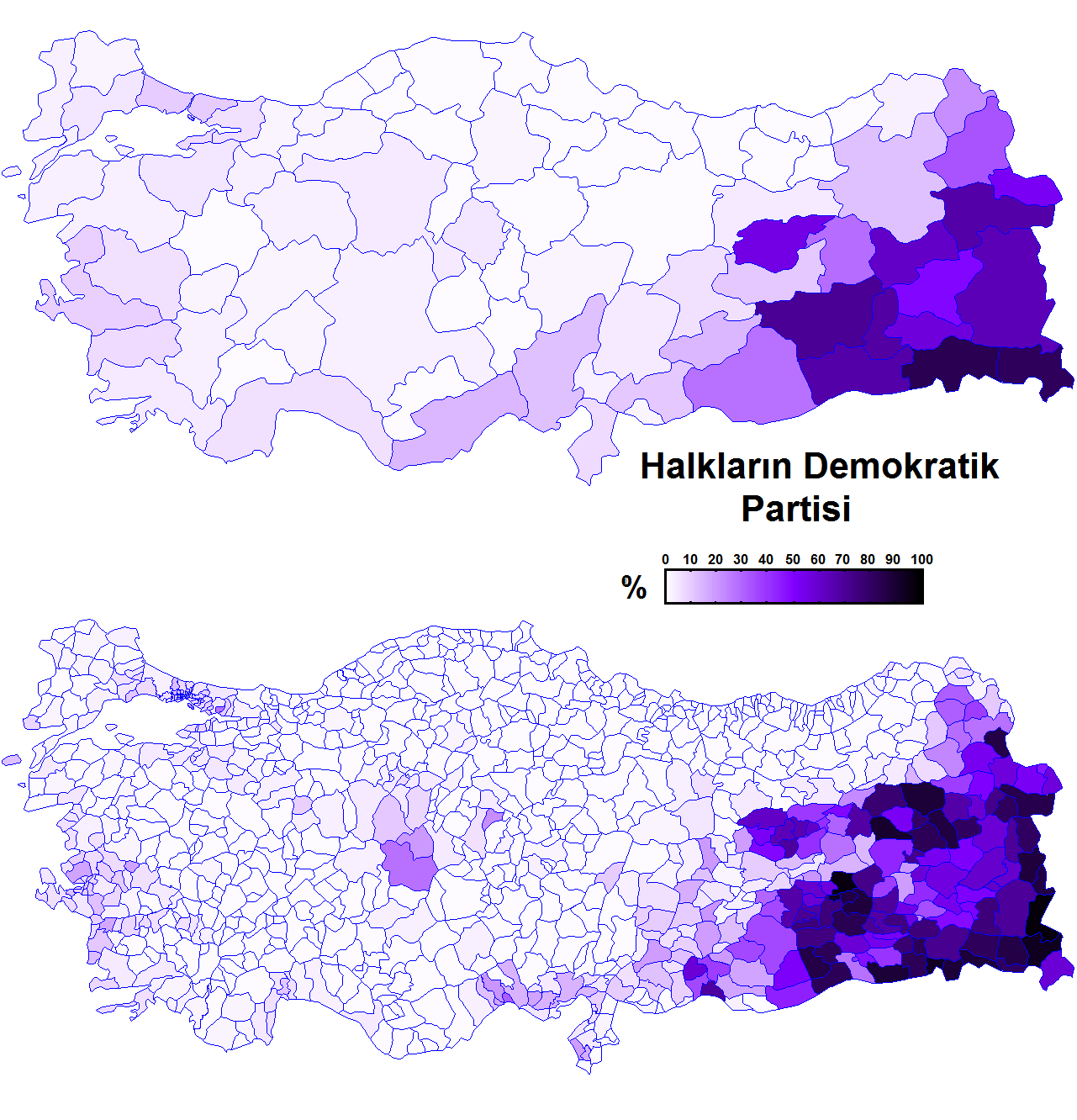
HDP Party's results at the November 2015 Turkish general election

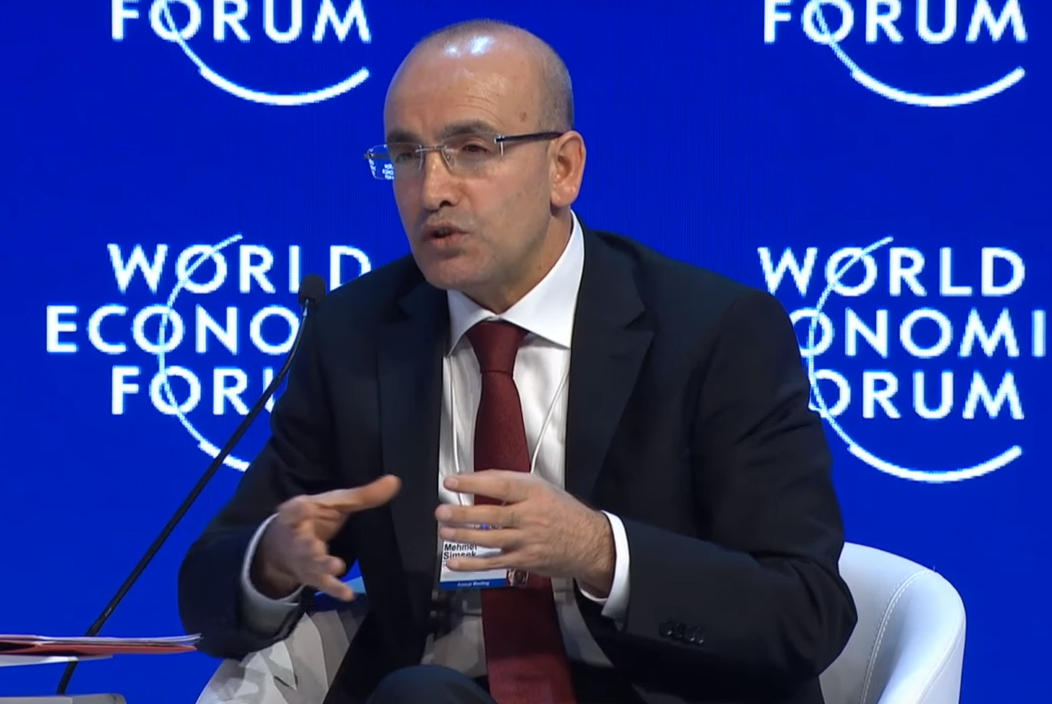
Mehmet Şimşek, minister of Finance, at the World Economic Forum in Davos

Kurdish politicians participate in Turkey's mainstream political parties, as well as smaller parties. Mehmet Mehdi Eker (Agriculture), Mehmet Şimşek (Finance) and Bekir Bozdağ (Deputy Prime Minister) are examples of ministers with Kurdish background who worked as ministers in the 61st government of Turkey.

There are also political parties that supports minority politics, like the Peoples' Democratic Party (HDP), which holds 58 out of 600 seats in the Parliament, a multi-ethnic society and friendly Turkish-Kurdish relations. Critics have accused the party of mainly representing the interests of the Kurdish minority in south-eastern Turkey, where the party polls the highest. The Turkish Government under Recep Tayyip Erdogan blames the HDP of holding relations with the armed militia PKK and has dismissed and arrested dozens of elected Mayors since the 2016 and since the municipal elections in March 2019 dismissed another 45 Mayors from the 65 Mayorships the party won. Since 2016 also Selahattin Demirtaş and Figen Yüksekdağ (at the time HDP party leaders) and several other members of Parliament of the HDP are imprisoned as part of the 2016 purges in Turkey.

=== Political parties ===
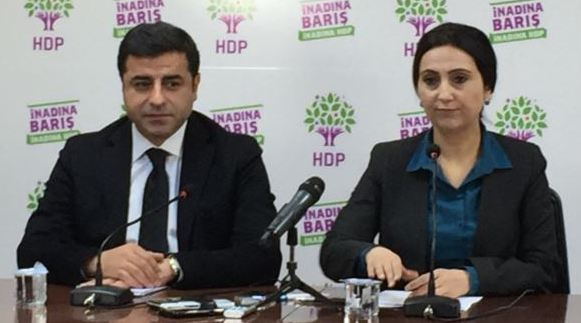
Pro-Kurdish HDP politicians Selahattin Demirtas and Figen Yüksekdağ had been arrested in 2016

Parties in Turkey with a high emphasis on Kurdish nationalism or minority politics include Democratic Regions Party, Rights and Freedoms Party, Communist Party of Kurdistan, Islamic Party of Kurdistan, Peoples' Democratic Party, Peoples' Equality and Democracy Party, Kurdistan Democratic Party/North (illegal), Revolutionary Party of Kurdistan (illegal). Defunct parties include Democracy Party (DEP; 1993–94), Democratic People's Party (1997–2005), Democratic Society Party (DTP; 2005–09), Freedom and Democracy Party (ÖZDEP; 1992–93), Kurdistan Islamic Movement (1993–2004), Peace and Democracy Party (2008–14), People's Democracy Party (HADEP; 1994–2003), People's Labor Party (HEP; 1990–93), Workers Vanguard Party of Kurdistan (1975–92). Banned parties include HEP, ÖZDEP (1993), DEP (1994), HADEP (2003), and DTP (2009).

=== Public opinion ===
According to a 2020 poll conducted by Kadir Has University, 17.3% of the surveyed people who identify as Kurdish answered the question "Which form of polity do Kurdish people want?" as "an independent Kurdish state". Around 25% of the non-Kurdish participants gave the same answer to the question. Roughly 33% of the Kurdish participants answered "more democratic Turkey", meanwhile those who responded "autonomy" composed 24.5% of the surveyed.

12.3% of those surveyed find the government policies concerning Kurdish issues "definitely successful", while those who said "definitely unsuccessful" were 11.7 percent. 31.5 percent of the respondents stated that the "main element connecting the Kurds and the Turks" was Islam, 24% stated that they shared a common history, and the rate of those who said "democratic society" was 4.5 percent. To the question "How do you evaluate the dismissal of some provincial and district mayorships and the appointment of trustees by proxy after the 31 March local elections?" 26.5 percent of the participants answered the question as positive and 38.2 percent as negative.

== Kurdish rebellions ==
- Koçkiri Rebellion (1920)
- Sheikh Said rebellion (1925)
- Ararat rebellion (1927–30)
- Dersim Rebellion (1937–1938)
- Kurdish–Turkish conflict (1978–present)

According to human rights organisations, since the beginning of the ongoing Kurdish–Turkish conflict in 1978, there have been over 4,000 Kurdish villages depopulated by Turkey and some 40,000 people have been killed. The conflict resumed in 2015. In December 2015, Turkish military operations against Kurdish rebels in Turkish Kurdistan have killed hundreds of civilians, displaced hundreds of thousands, and caused massive destruction in residential areas.

== Culture ==
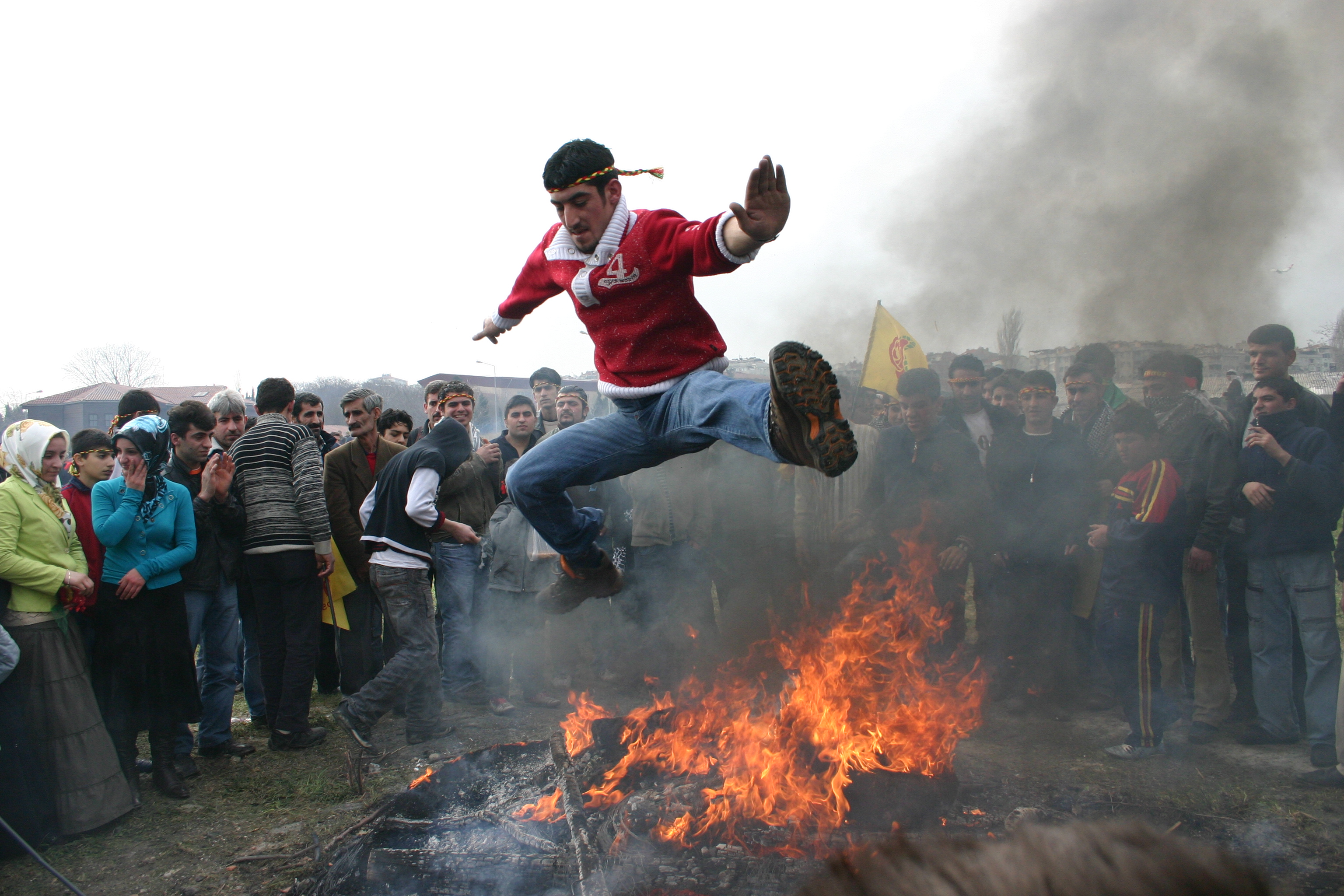
Kurdish man jumping the fire during Newroz.

=== Music ===
Between 1982 and 1991, the performance or recording of songs in the Kurdish language on television and radio was banned in Turkey, affecting singers such as Şivan Perwer, Mahsun Kırmızıgül and İbrahim Tatlıses. However, a black market sprang up, and pirate radio stations and underground recordings became available.

Şivan Perwer is a composer, vocalist and tembûr player. He concentrates mainly on political and nationalistic music—of which he is considered the founder in Kurdish music—as well as classical and folk music.

Another important Kurdish musician from Turkey is Nizamettin Arıç (Feqiyê Teyra). He began with singing in Turkish, and made his directorial debut and also stars in Klamek ji bo Beko (A Song for Beko), one of the first films in Kurdish. Arıç rejected musical stardom at the cost of debasing his language and culture. As a result of singing in Kurdish, he was imprisoned, and then obliged to flee to Syria and eventually to Germany.

=== Literature ===
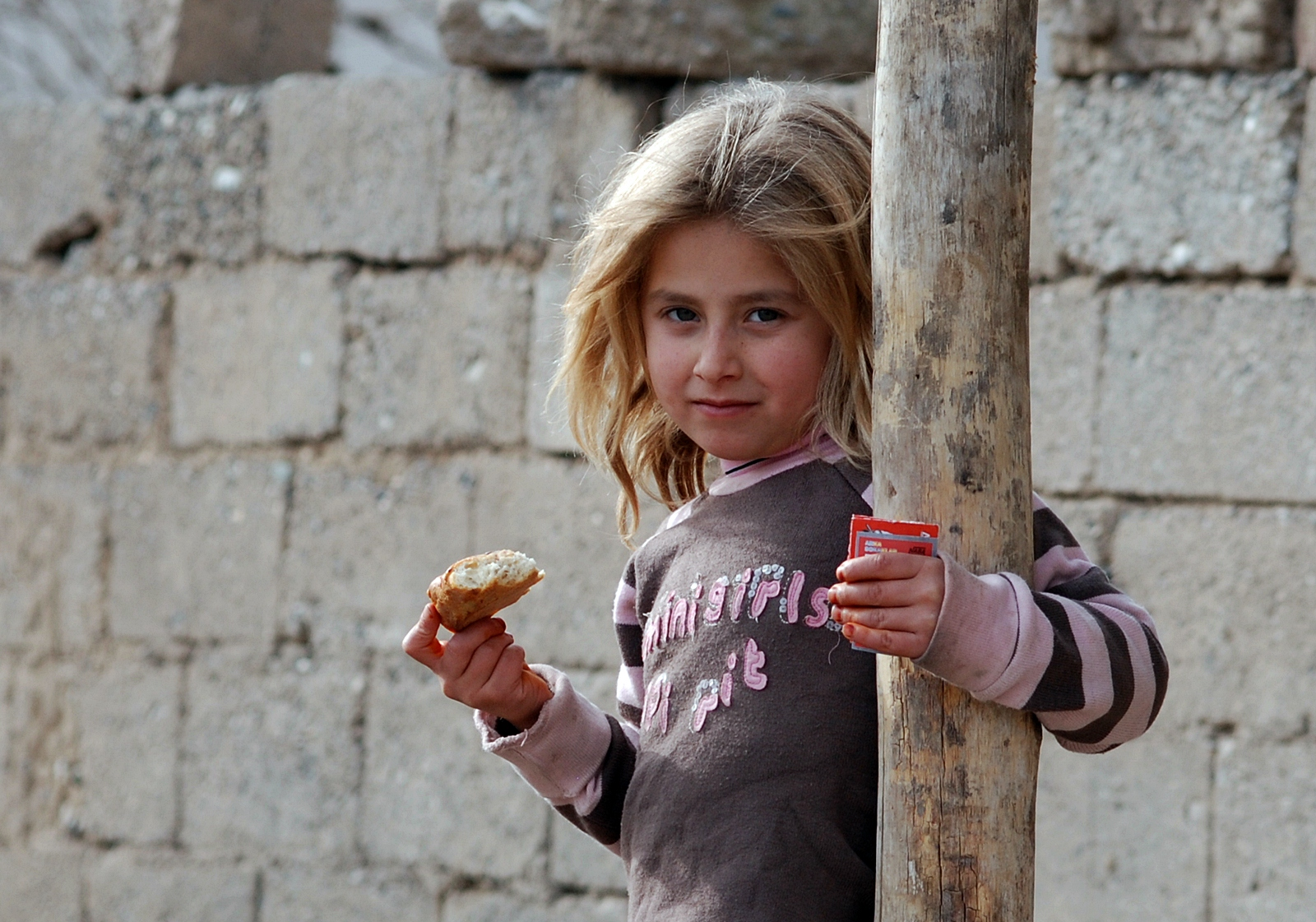
A Kurdish girl in Savur, Mardin (2009)

Some sources consider Ali Hariri (1425–1495) as the first well-known poet who wrote in Kurdish. He was from the Hakkari region. Other well known are Sharafkhan Bidlisi the author of Sharafname and Ahmad Khani who wrote the Kurdish national epic Mem û Zin. During decades, the letters X, Q, and W which are part of the Kurdish alphabet were prohibited to be used and only in 2013, the ban was lifted.

=== Film ===
In 2011, Kanal D, Turkey's largest television station, began filming Ayrılık Olmasaydı: ben-u sen in majority-Kurdish Diyarbakir. The show, written by a Kurdish screenwriter, professed to be the first in the popular genre to portray the Kurds in a positive light. The show was set to debut in early 2012, but suffered numerous delays, some say because of the controversial subject.

== Demographics ==
Historical Kurdish population according to census results (1927–1970)
Year	Total Kurdish speakers	%	Note
1927	1,184,446	8.7%	L1: 1,184,446; No numbers on L2
1935	1,594,702	9.9%	L1: 1,480,246; L2: 114,456
1945	1,593,692	8.5%	L1: 1,476,562; L2: 117,130
1950	2,069,921	9.9%	L1: 1,854,569; L2: 215,352
1955	1,942,285	8.1%	L1: 1,679,265; L2: 263,020
1960	2,317,132	8.3%	L1: 1,847,674; L2: 469,458
1965	2,817,313	9%	L1: 2,370,233; L2: 447,080
1970	3,225,795	9.1%	data published by major newspapers

The majority of Kurds live in Turkey. Estimations on the Kurdish population in Turkey varies considerably according to sources. A professor of political science, Michael Gunter wrote that Kurdish sources tend to exaggerate numbers, while the states that Kurds live in often undercount the Kurdish population.

Their numbers are estimated at 14,000,000 people by the CIA world factbook (18% of population). A report commissioned by the National Security Council (Turkey) in 2000 puts the number at 12,600,000 people, or 15.7% of the population. One Western source estimates that up to 25% of the Turkish population is Kurdish (approximately 18-19 million people). Kurdish nationalists put the figure at 20,000,000 to 25,000,000. All of the above figures are for the number of people who identify as Kurds, not the number who speak a Kurdish language, but include both Kurds and Zazas. Estimates based on native languages place the Kurdish population at 6% to 23%; Ibrahim Sirkeci claims the closest figure should be above 17.8%, taking into account political context and the potential biases in responses recorded in surveys and censuses. The population growth rate of Kurds in the 1970s was given as 3.27%. According to two studies (2006 and 2008) study by KONDA, people who self-identify as Kurdish or Zaza and/or speaks Kurmanji or Zazaki as a mother tongue correspond to 13.4% of the population. Based on higher birth rates among Kurdish people, and using 2000 Census results, KONDA suggested that this figure rises to 15.7% when children are included, at the end of 2007.

Since the immigration to the big cities in the west of Turkey, interethnic marriage has become more common. A 2013 study estimates that there are 2,708,000 marriages between Turks and Kurds/Zaza. A 2002 report showed that most mixed marriages happened in large cities and areas where their own group formed a minority. In most mixed marriages, the men were Kurds while the women were Turks. Turks with lower level education were more open to marrying Kurds, while Kurds with higher level education were more open to marrying Turks. Marriages between Kurdish men and Turkish women were a phenomenon in western Turkey linked to linked to social mobility and assimilation pressures. In a study about ethnic demographics of Turkey, Peter Andrews stated that "Intermarriage rates are higher among Kurdish men marrying Turkish women than vice versa, largely due to patriarchal family structures and migration patterns." Nizamettin Arslan also stated that "Kurdish men’s marriages to Turkish women are more socially accepted than the opposite, due to entrenched patriarchal values and ethnic hierarchies."

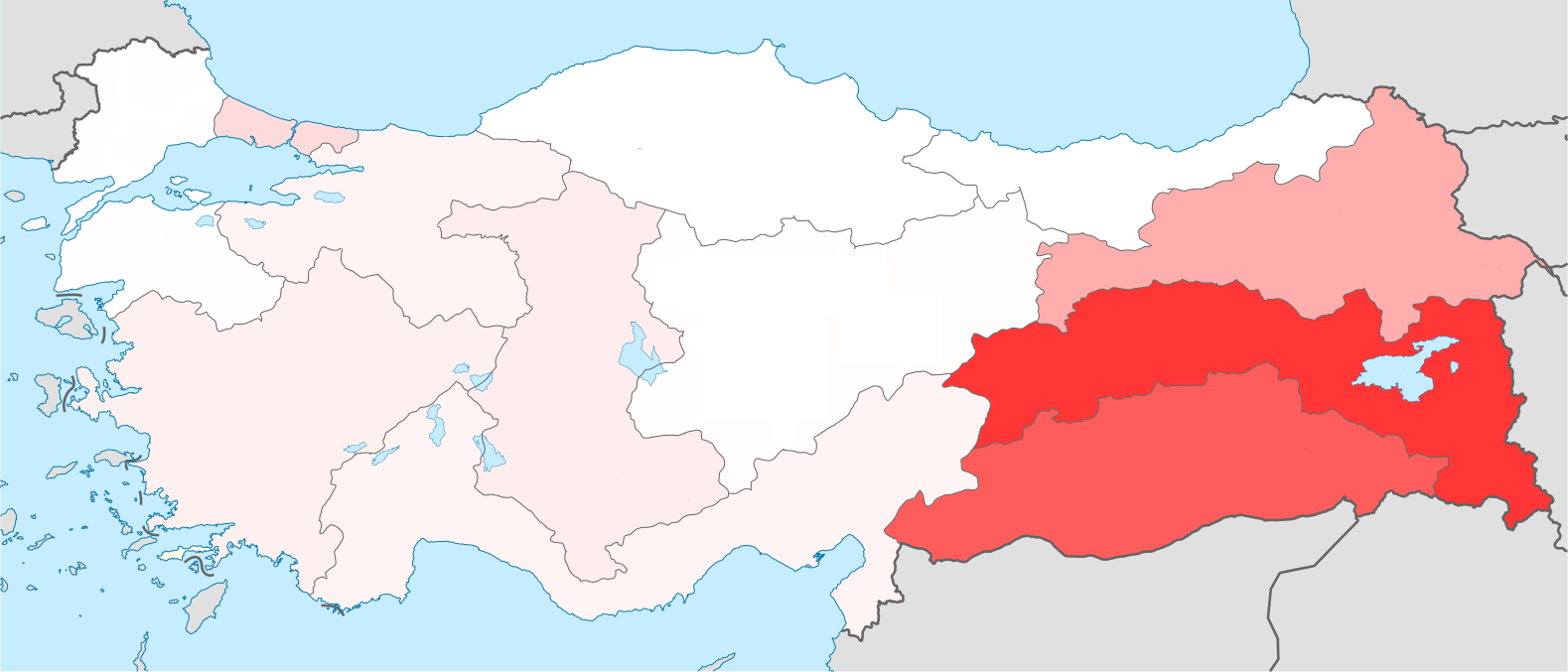
Percentage of Kurdish population in Turkey by region

Turkish government statistics show that Kurdish women in Turkey give birth to about four children, more than double the rate for the rest of the Turkish population. The Kurdish population is growing, while the rest of the country has birth rates below replacement level. In some Kurdish dominated provinces women give birth to 7.1 children on average. Women in Kurdish dominated provinces of eastern Turkey also have an illiteracy rate about three times higher than men, which correlates with higher birth rates. In 2000 66% of 15-year-old girls from Şırnak Province could not read or write.

=== Language ===
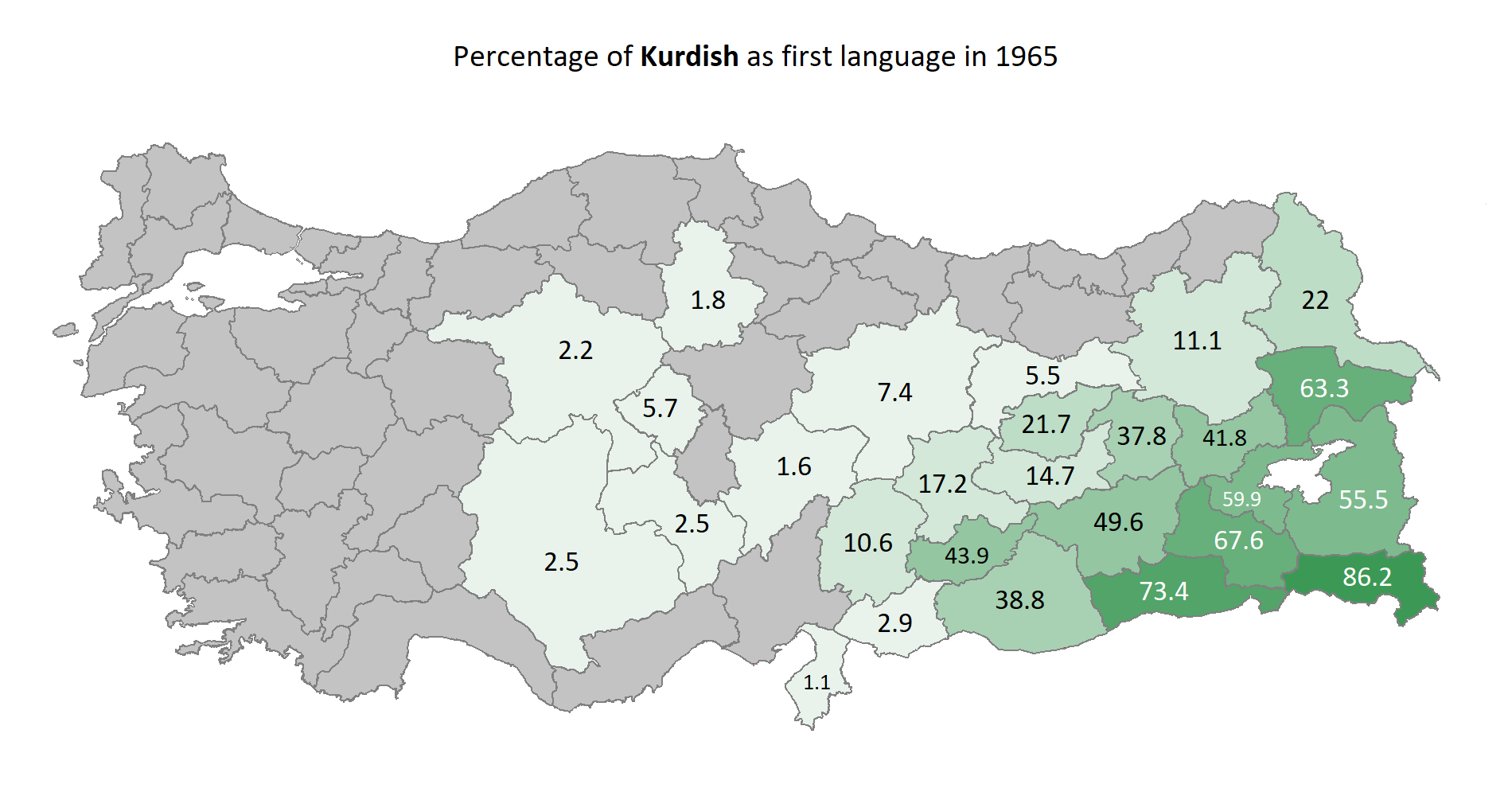
Percentage of people speaking Kurdish as their first language by province, according to the 1965 census

The Kurdish language in Turkey, primarily Kurmanji and Zazaki, has faced systemic marginalization, leading to significant language shift. According to a 2020 survey, while 80% of Kurdish parents of children aged 3–13 claimed proficiency in Kurdish, only 24% used it as the primary language of communication at home. Among urban Kurdish youth (aged 18–30), less than half reported regular use of Kurdish, and only 18% could read and write in their mother tongue. Efforts to promote Kurdish include introducing it as an elective subject in schools in 2012. Initial participation was 18,847 students, which grew to 77,931 by the 2015–2016 academic year. However, participation stagnated, with approximately 60,000 students studying Kurdish as of 2019 based on textbook data. University-level Kurdish studies began in 2011, with Mardin Artuklu University receiving 2,500 applications for its master's program in 2012–2013, though the program has faced challenges, including declining enrollment due to poor employment prospects for graduates. Despite these efforts, the broader language shift continues, exacerbated by limited intergenerational transmission and restrictions on mother-tongue education under Article 42 of Turkey’s 1982 Constitution, which prohibits non-Turkish languages from being taught as mother tongues in schools.

The majority of people who identify as Kurds speak Kurmanji, meanwhile a minority of them speak Turkish or Zazaki as their mother language. A study published in 2015 that demographically analysed the Kurdish inhabited regions of Turkey (excluding diaspora) concluded that c. 92% people belonging to Kurdish ethnic identity spoke Kurdish languages, 6.4% spoke Turkish, and 1.4% spoke Zaza as their mother language. Around 2% of the surveyed people who identified as Zaza, but not Kurd expressed that their mother tongue was Kurdish. 3.1% of the Turks and 4.6% of Arabs also stated that they spoke Kurdish. Concerning Alevi people, c. 70% spoke Zaza, 20% Kurdish and 10% Turkish.

Around 75% of the Kurds stated that they either had "very good" or "good" proficiency in their respective mother languages. 55% of those who had "very good" or "good" proficiency in their mother language stated that their children were also proficient. Around 75% of the Kurds and 2% of the Zazas (58.4% for Zazaki) declared that they spoke Kurdish at home. Turkish was spoken by 22.4% and 38.3% at home, respectively. Turkish (70%) was the dominant household language for Alevi population.

=== Religion ===
Most of the Kurdish people living in Turkey are Sunni Muslims, though Alevism comprises a sizable minority of about 30%. 24.4% of the Kurds and 9.8% of Zazas declared that they were belonging to Hanafi school, meanwhile the vast majority of them were of the Shafiʽi school, which contrasted the local Turkish and Arab population, both of whom were overwhelmingly Hanafi. 3.1% of the Kurds and 14.8% of Zazas were Alevi, compared to 5.4 percent of Turks and 1.1 percent of Arabs.

Kurds and Zazas in Eastern Turkey are found to be more religious compared to both general population of Turkey and the Turkish population in the same region. Religious observance rates such as fasting during Ramadan, praying 5 times a day or going to Jumu'ah regularly show similar patterns. On the other hand, people who are Alevis show the least amount of religiosity and lowest observance rates, both regionally and nationally. 96 to 97 percent of the surveyed Kurd and Zaza groups in Eastern Turkey had someone in their household who wears headscarf, which was higher compared to Turkish population of the region. Only around 11% of Alevis declared that there were someone with headscarf in their household. 4.3% of both Kurd and Zaza groups were members of a specific religious sect, which was roughly double the rate of regional Turkish and Alevi population.

=== Tribes ===
33.4% of the Kurds and 21.2% of the Zaza from Eastern Turkey declared that they had tribal affiliations (Kurdish: eşîr, Turkish: aşiret), compared to c. 3% of the Turks in the same region. Tribal affiliation was highest (73%) among the people who declared that they were Alevis. 18.5% of those who were a member of a tribe stated that their tribe was an important factor for their political decisions. Around 10% of the surveyed tribal members claimed it was economically important to be in a tribe.

== Central Anatolia ==
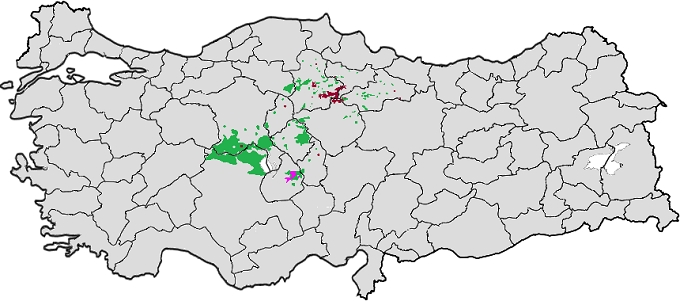
Map of Kurds of Central Anatolia

The Kurds of Central Anatolia (Kurdish: Kurdên Anatolyayê/Anatolê, Turkish: Orta Anadolu Kürtleri or İç Anadolu Kürtleri are the Kurdish people who have immigrated and been in Central Anatolia (present day Aksaray, Ankara, Çankırı, Çorum, Eskişehir, Karaman, Kayseri, Kırıkkale, Kırşehir, Konya, Nevşehir, Niğde, Sivas, Yozgat provinces) since about 16th century. They number between 50,000 and 100,000 people. The core of the Kurds of Central Anatolia is formed by Tuz Gölü Kürtleri (Kurds of Lake Tuz) who live in the provinces Ankara, Konya and Aksaray. Mustafa Kemal (Atatürk) mentioned them as "Konya çöllerindeki Kürtler" (Kurds in the Konya deserts) in the interview with Ahmet Emin (Yalman) dated January 16/17, 1923.

According to Hermann Wenzel, the original breeders of the Angora goat were the Kurds of Inner Anatolia.

The largest tribes of the Kurds of Central Anatolia are the Bazaini or Shaikh Bazaini, Judikan, Saifkan, Chelebi, Janbeki, Jehanbegli, Khallikan, Mutikan, Hajibani, Barakati, Badeli, Ukhchizhemi, Rashvan, Sherdi, Urukchi, Milan, Zirikan, Atmanikan, and Tirikan. Formerly, some of the Janbegli, Rashvan and Milan tribes were of Alevi origin and followed Alevism.

Two or the four primary dialects of Kurdish are used by the Central Anatolian Kurds. These are Kurmanji and Dimili/Zaza. Generally, their mother language is Kurmanji Kurdish who have difficulty understanding the dialect spoken in Haymana where the Şêxbizin tribe live. It is said that the new generation of Kurdish people in some settlements no longer speak Kurdish.

== Human rights ==
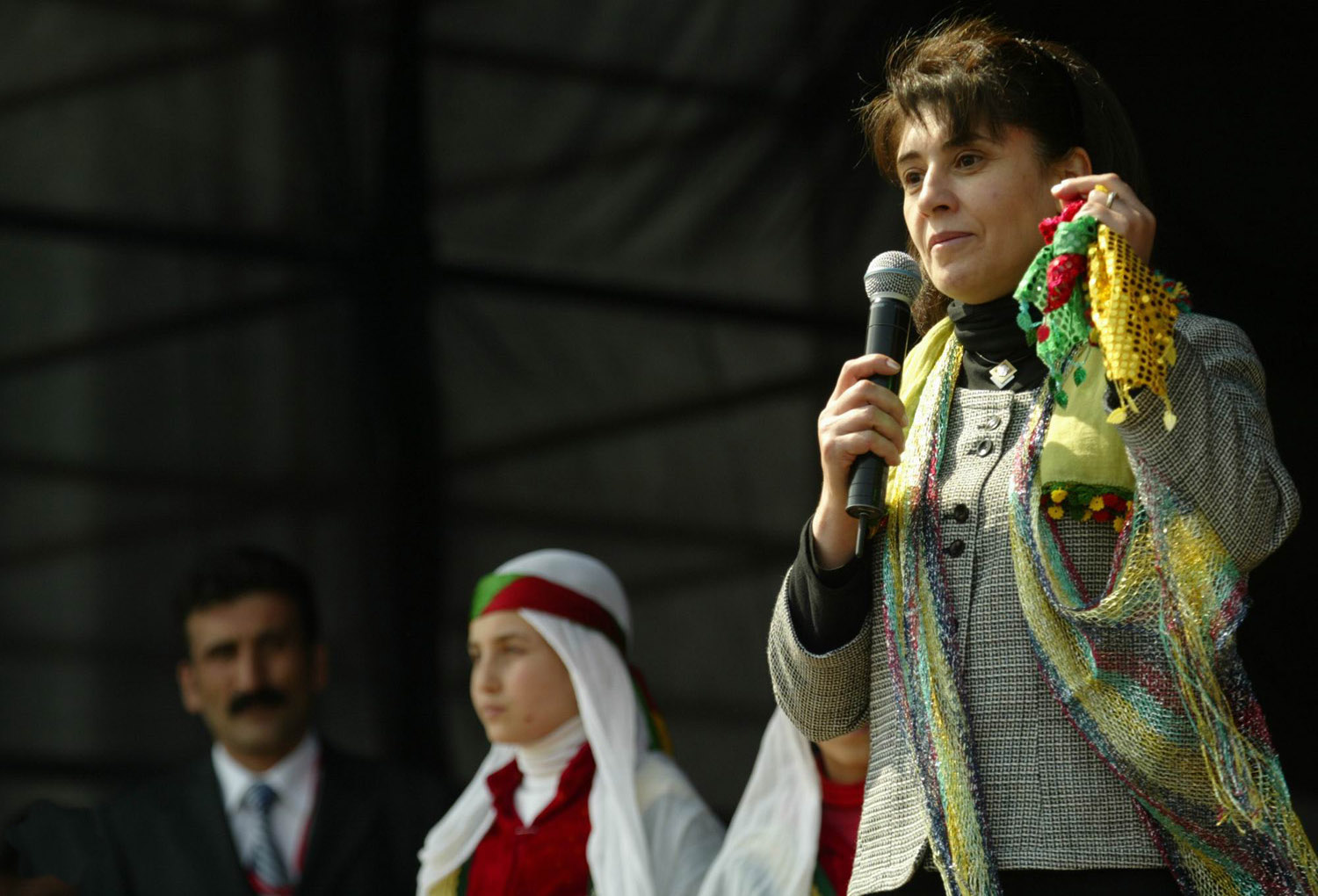
Leyla Zana; Kurdish politician who was awarded the 1995 Sakharov Prize

Since the 1970s, the European Court of Human Rights (ECHR) has condemned Turkey for thousands of human rights abuses. The judgments are related to executions of Kurdish civilians, torturing, forced displacements, destroyed villages, arbitrary arrests, murdered and disappeared Kurdish journalists. To cite a recent case, in 2018 and 2020, the ECHR ruled that the arrest and ongoing imprisonment of Selahattin Demirtaş was contrary to five articles in the European Convention on Human Rights and had the "ulterior purpose of stifling pluralism and limiting freedom of political debate" and ordered Turkey to pay him 25,000 Euros in compensation. Turkey refused to release him.

The European Commission Against Racism and Intolerance (ECRI) reports that (as of April 2010): "The public use by officials of the Kurdish language lays them open to prosecution, and public defence by individuals of Kurdish or minority interests also frequently leads to prosecutions under the Criminal Code." From the 1994 briefing at the International Human Rights Law Group: "the problem in Turkey is the Constitution is against the Kurds and the apartheid constitution is very similar to it."

In 1998 Leyla Zana received a jail sentence. This prompted one member of the U.S. House of Representative, Elizabeth Furse, to accuse Turkey of being a racist state and continuing to deny the Kurds a voice in the state". Abbas Manafy from New Mexico Highlands University claims "The Kurdish deprivation of their own culture, language, and tradition is incompatible with democratic norms. It reflects an apartheid system that victimizes minorities like Armenians, Kurds, and Alevis."

== See also ==
- Kurds of Khorasan
- Minorities in Turkey
  - Armenians in Turkey
- Human rights in Turkey
- List of Kurdish people
- Turkification
- A Modern History of the Kurds by David McDowall
