= Van Province (disambiguation) =

Van Province may refer to:

- Van Province, one of the provinces of the Republic of Turkey
- Van Eyalet, one of the eyalet of the Ottoman Empire
- Van Vilayet, one of the vilayet of the Ottoman Empire
