= Sarı Süleyman =

Sarı Süleyman ("Süleyman the Blond") may refer to:

- Sarı Süleyman Bey (fl. 1643)
- Sarı Süleyman Pasha (fl. 1685–87), the Grand Vizier
