= Hoşab, Gürpınar =

Hoşab or Güzelsu
- Neighbourhood
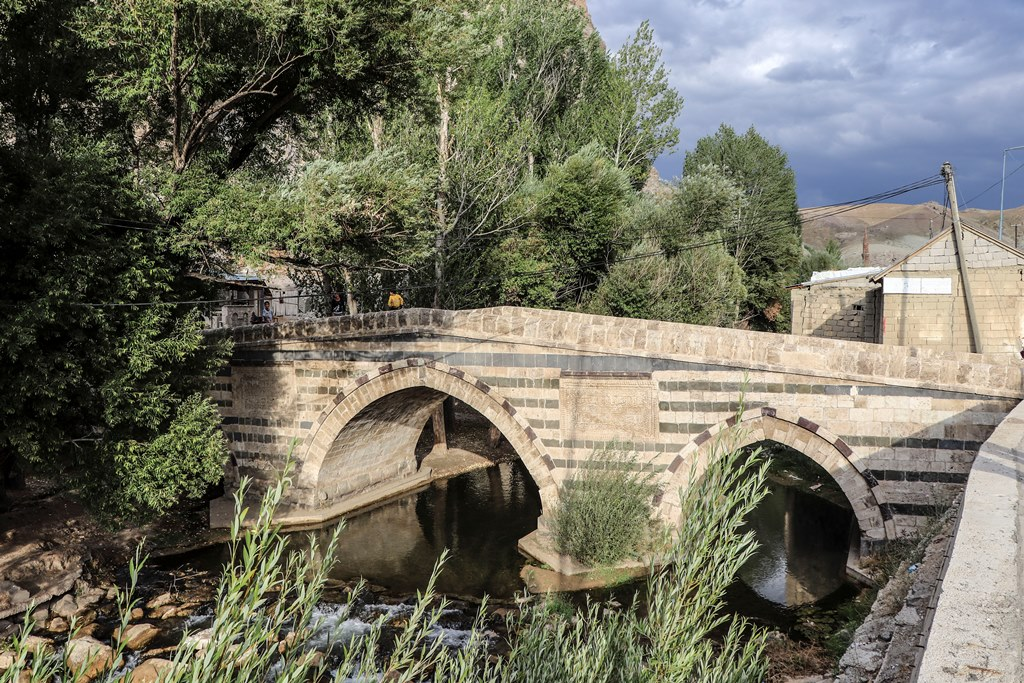
- Hoşap River bridge at Güzelsu

- Location within Turkey
- Coordinates: 38°19′0″N 43°47′48″E
- Country: Turkey
- Province: Van
- District: Gürpınar
- Population (2022): 1,256
- Time zone: UTC+3 (TRT)

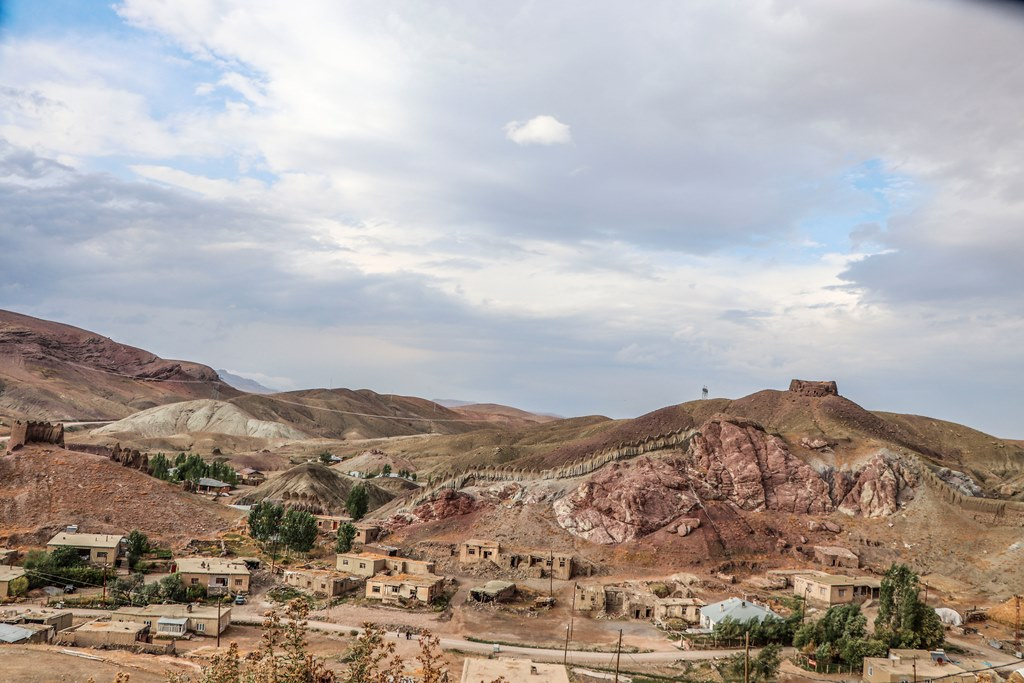
Güzelsu surrounded by a mud-brick wall with mud-brick homes

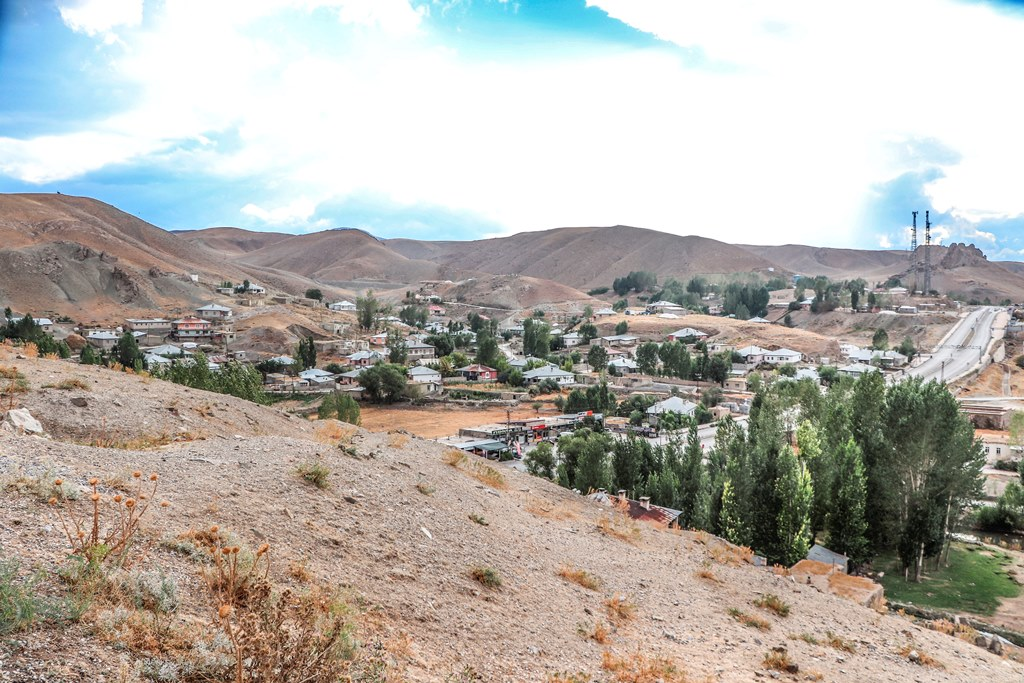
Güzelsu new town along the Van-Hakkari Highway

Hoşab (also: Hoşap or Xoşabê) is the historical name of a neighbourhood of the municipality and district of Gürpınar, Van Province, Turkey. Its present name is Güzelsu. Its population is 1,256 (2022). The Kurdish name (Hoşap) and the Turkish name (Güzelsu) of the village both translate as "beautiful water", referring to the Hoşap River on whose banks the village is sitting. Güzelsu is at a distance of approximately 50 km east of the city of Van.

== Description ==
Located on the flat ground north of the Hoşap Castle rock, Güzelsu is surrounded by a mud-brick wall, much eroded today, but still quite striking. Flat roofed homes and stables made of mud-brick are filling a low depression between the castle mound and the mud-brick wall, while the new village is sitting on the opposite bank of the river along the Van-Hakkari Highway (D.975).

A 32 m long, 6 m wide and 5 m high historic bridge spans the Hoşap River, providing access to the castle. it features three pointed arches, one main span flanked by two smaller ones. It is made entirely of cut white stone, while its downstream façade is adorned with alternating rows of black and white stones. Two foundation plaques, which are placed between the arches, are framed with carved muqarnas and floral motifs and protected with stone eaves. They are from 1671 and written in a mixture of Turkish, Persian and Arabic in honour of the bridge's builder, Zeynel Bey, the head of the local Mahmudi tribe governing Hoşab under Ottoman rule at that time.
