= Van Eyalet =

Administrative division of the Ottoman Empire from 1548 to 1864

ایالت وان Eyalet-i Van
- Eyalet of the Ottoman Empire
- 1548–1864
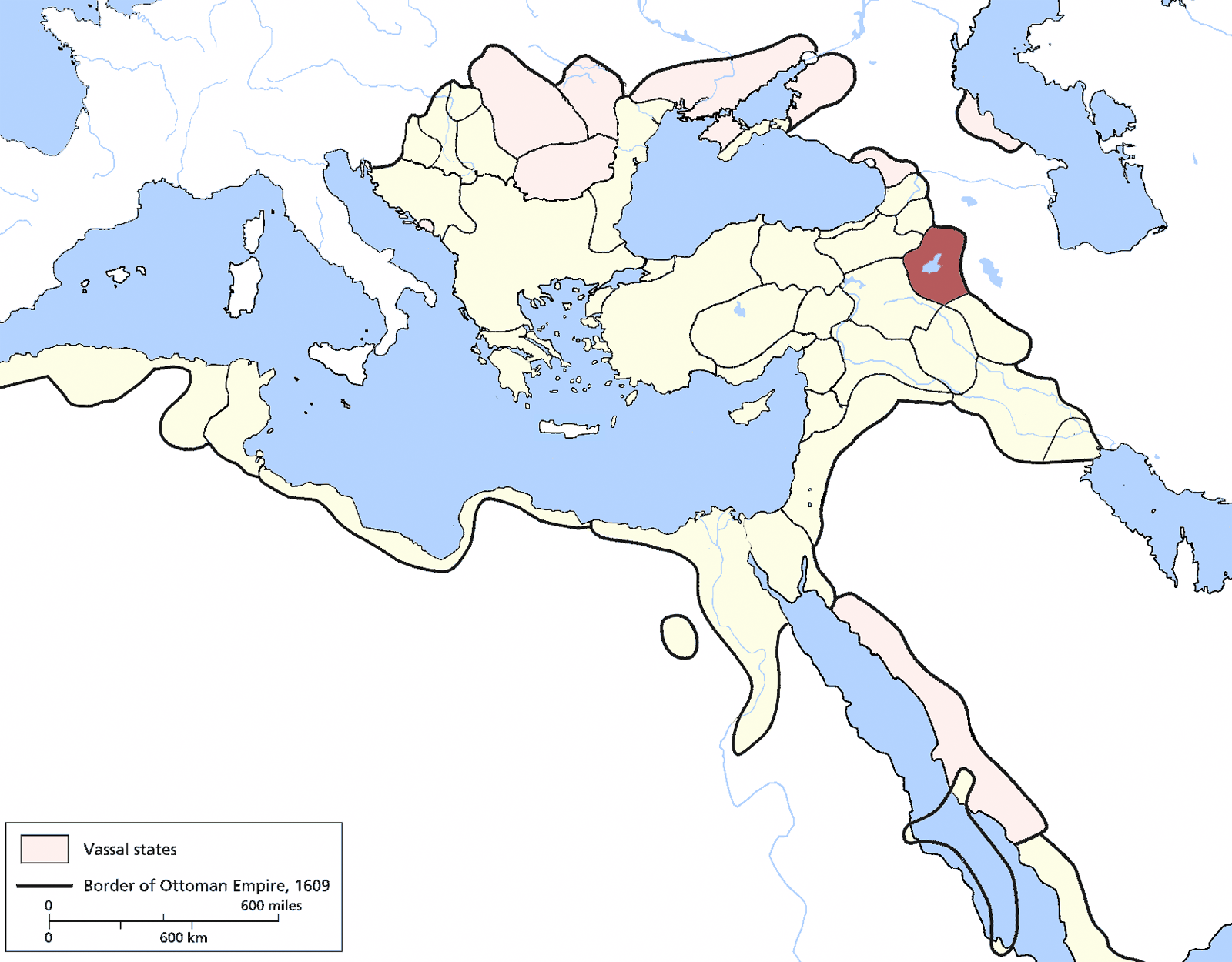
- The Eyalet of Van in 1609
- Capital: Van
- History
  - Established: 1548
  - Disestablished: 1864
| Preceded by | Succeeded by |
| Safavid Empire | Van Vilayet |
- Today part of: Turkey; Iran

The Van Eyalet (Ottoman Turkish: ایالت وان, romanized: Eyālet-i Vān) was an eyalet of the Ottoman Empire. The capital was Van. It was formed in 1548 as one of the Beylerbeyliks of the Ottoman Empire. Its reported area in the 19th century was 9,616 square miles (24,910 km^{2}).

It included territory in Western Armenia (now the Eastern Anatolia region in Turkey) as well as a small part of present-day Iran (the Sanjak of Sero, today in Urmia County).

== Administrative divisions ==
Administrative division of the beylerbeylik of Van between 1680 and 1702 were as follows:

1. Sanjak of Van (Paşa Sancağı, Van)
2. Government of Bitlis (Bitlis Hükûmeti, Bitlis)
3. Government of Hizan (Hizan Hükûmeti, Hizan)
4. Government of Hakkâri (Hakkâri Hükûmeti, Hakkâri)
5. Government of Hoşab (or Mahmûdî, Hoşab Hükûmeti, Güzelsu)
6. Sanjak of Karkar (Kârkâr Sancağı, Daldere)
7. Sanjak of Zeriki (Zeriki Sancağı, Sarıca)
8. Sanjak of Şırvî (Şırvî Sancağı, Şirvan )
9. Sanjak of Müküs (Müküs Sancağı, Bahçesaray)
10. Sanjak of Şıtak (Şıtak Sancağı, Çatak)
11. Sanjak of Albak (Albak Sancağı, Başkale)
12. Sanjak of Ispaghird (Espayrid Sancağı, Sürücüler)
13. Sanjak of Erdjish or Arjis (Erciş Sancağı, Erciş)
14. Sanjak of Keshan (Késan Sancağı, Ergeçidi)
15. Sanjak of Adil Djevaz (Adilcevâz Sancağı, Adilcevaz)
16. Sanjak of Aghakis (Ağakis Sancağı, Göllü)
17. Sanjak of Bargeri (Bargiri Sancağı, Muradiye)
18. Sanjak of Diyadin (Diyadin Sancağı, Diyadin)
19. Sanjak of Somay (Somay Sancağı, Sero)
20. Sanjak of Harun (Harûn Sancağı, Güzelkonak)

The Sanjaks of Bitlis, Hakkâri, Mahmûdî and Somay (also called Pinyanişi) had ziamet and timar in the 17th century.
