= Workers Vanguard Party of Kurdistan =

Underground political party in Turkey

Workers Vanguard Party of Kurdistan (in Kurdish: Partîya Pêşeng a Karkerî Kurdistan, PPKK, in Turkish: Kürdistan Öncü İşçi Partisi) was a Kurdish underground political party in Turkey.

The party was founded on April 22, 1975.

PPKK published Pêşeng.

In 1992 PPKK merged with Kürdistan Ulusal Kurtuluşçuları-Sosyalist Eğilim (KUK-SE) and Kurdistan Liberation Organization (Kürdistan Özgürlük Örgütü, KAK), to form the United People's Party of Kurdistan (YEKBÛN).
