= Mahmudi (tribe) =

Kurdish tribe in Turkey

The Mahmudi, also known as Pinyanişi, is a Kurdish tribe in the Lake Van region.

== History ==
According to Evliya Çelebi (1611–1682) they had 60,000 warriors.

The Yezidi Mahmudi tribe were loyal to the Safavids until their leader, Hasan Beg, converted from Yezidism to Islam and switched sides to the Ottomans following the Ottoman attack on Azerbaijan (Modern day Iranian Azerbaijan) in 1554 during the Safavid Campaign (1554–55).

Their chief, Sarı Süleyman Bey, strengthened the Hoşap Castle in the Lake Van region, in 1643.

They bordered the Safavids, and were often raided by them.

== See also ==
- Kurdish tribes

== Sources ==
- University of Wisconsin (2003). International Journal of Turkish Studies. Vol. 9. University of Wisconsin.
