= Sarı Süleyman Bey =

Ottoman Kurdish governor and chief of the Mahmudis

- ساری سلیمان‌بگ

Governor of the Mahmudi Kurdish tribe
- In office Before 1643 – Unknown
- Preceded by: Unknown
- Succeeded by: Unknown

Personal details
- Born: Ottoman Empire
- Died: Ottoman Empire
- Profession: Politician, tribal leader
- Known for: Strengthening Hoşap Castle

Military service
- Allegiance: Ottoman Empire

Sarı Süleyman Bey ("Süleyman Bey the Blond", fl. 1643) was an Ottoman Kurdish governor, the chief of the Mahmudis (a Kurdish tribe) under the Ottoman regime, who strengthened the Hoşap Castle in the Lake Van region.
