= Hoşap Castle =

Medieval castle in Eastern Anatolia, Turkey

- Kela Xoşebê
- Hoşab, Gürpınar District, Van, Turkey
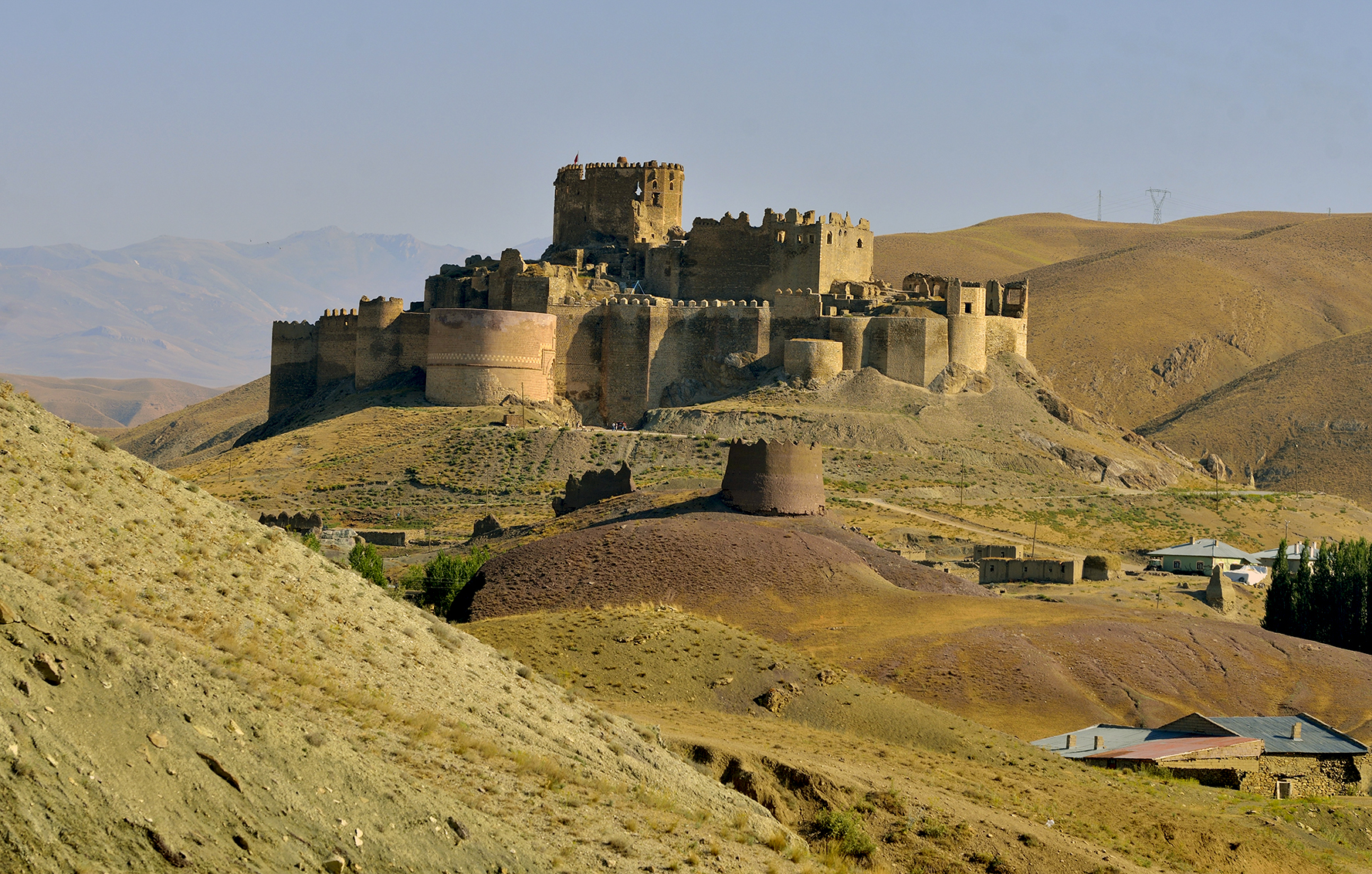
- Castle of Hoşab

Site information
- Type: Castle
- Controlled by: Ministry of Culture and Tourism
- Open to the public: yes

Location
- Location of Hoşap Castle in Turkey
- Location within Turkey
- Coordinates: 38°19′02″N 43°48′06″E

Site history
- Built: 1649
- Built by: Sarı Süleyman Bey

Hoşap Castle (Turkish: Hoşap kalesi, Kurdish: Kela Xoşebê, Armenian: Խոշաբ բերդ, romanized: Khoshab Berd) is a large 17th-century castle located in the village of Hoşab, Gürpınar District, Van, Turkey. It is at a distance of approximately 50 km to the city center of Van.

== History ==
The site on which the castle stands contains the remains of a medieval Armenian fortress, preceded by an Urartian stronghold, with the eastern stretches and towers preserving the layout of the original Armenian structure. The Armenian structure had only two walls, one located near the keep and one at the present-day intermediate walls. Most of the surviving masonry, including the entrance tower and outer walls, was built or rebuilt in 1649 by Sarı Süleyman Bey, ruler of the Kurdish Mahmudi principality.

The 13th-century geographer Yāqūt al-Ḥamawī mentioned Khawshāb among the castles held by the ruler of Mosul in his description of Zawazān, a region extending from the vicinity of Mosul towards Khilāt and Salmas.

The 17th-century Ottoman traveller Evliya Çelebi attributed Hoşap Castle's origins to the Abbasid period and associated its construction with the Hakkari Kurds. He recorded that the castle passed into the possession of the Mahmudi dynasty in 1397–1398 and subsequently became their seat. Çelebi described its extensive fortifications and attributed major building works to the Mahmudi ruler Sarı Süleyman Bey. He also noted that Sultan Süleyman I had granted the Mahmudi hereditary rights over their territory in the Van region in recognition of their military service.

The fortress received its name from the river of the same name. Hoşap means "fresh water" in Persian. Çelebi recorded that the Kurds called the castle Hoş-âv, explaining that âv means water in Kurdish, while the people of Van called it Hoşaf.

The Mahmudi tribe, which occupied the fortress of Hoşap, originally adhered to the Yezidi faith and migrated to the region from Cizre.

The former town of Hoşap lay on the flat ground north of the castle rock and in the enclosed space on the opposite side of the castle from the road; the present village extends into this space. The town was defended at one corner by the castle and elsewhere by a wall, which originally started from the ends of the castle’s two cliffs. Built of mud, and toothed with the remains of mud battlements, the wall of the early Ottoman period can still be seen in stretches.

On the north of the former town it now starts from a point beyond but the line of the cliff, near the Van road and extends along a natural ridge eastwards. From the castle’s southerly cliff the wall crosses the low saddle to the north-east. The two walls meet at the summit of the next hill, in order to keep control of all the land commanding the town. Beyond this hill’s summit stretches a seemingly empty expanse of low, spreading hills. Until the 1850s, the fortress-city of Khoshab had about 1,500 families, including 1,000 Armenians. The Armenians of Khoshab were engaged in agriculture, crafts, and trade and had two churches within the fortress that were destroyed upon their expulsion, while the Kurds were mostly engaged in animal husbandry. Until 1847, semi-independent Kurdish beys also resided there, but in the same year the Ottoman government, occupying the fortress, abolished their semi-independent rule.

== Gallery ==
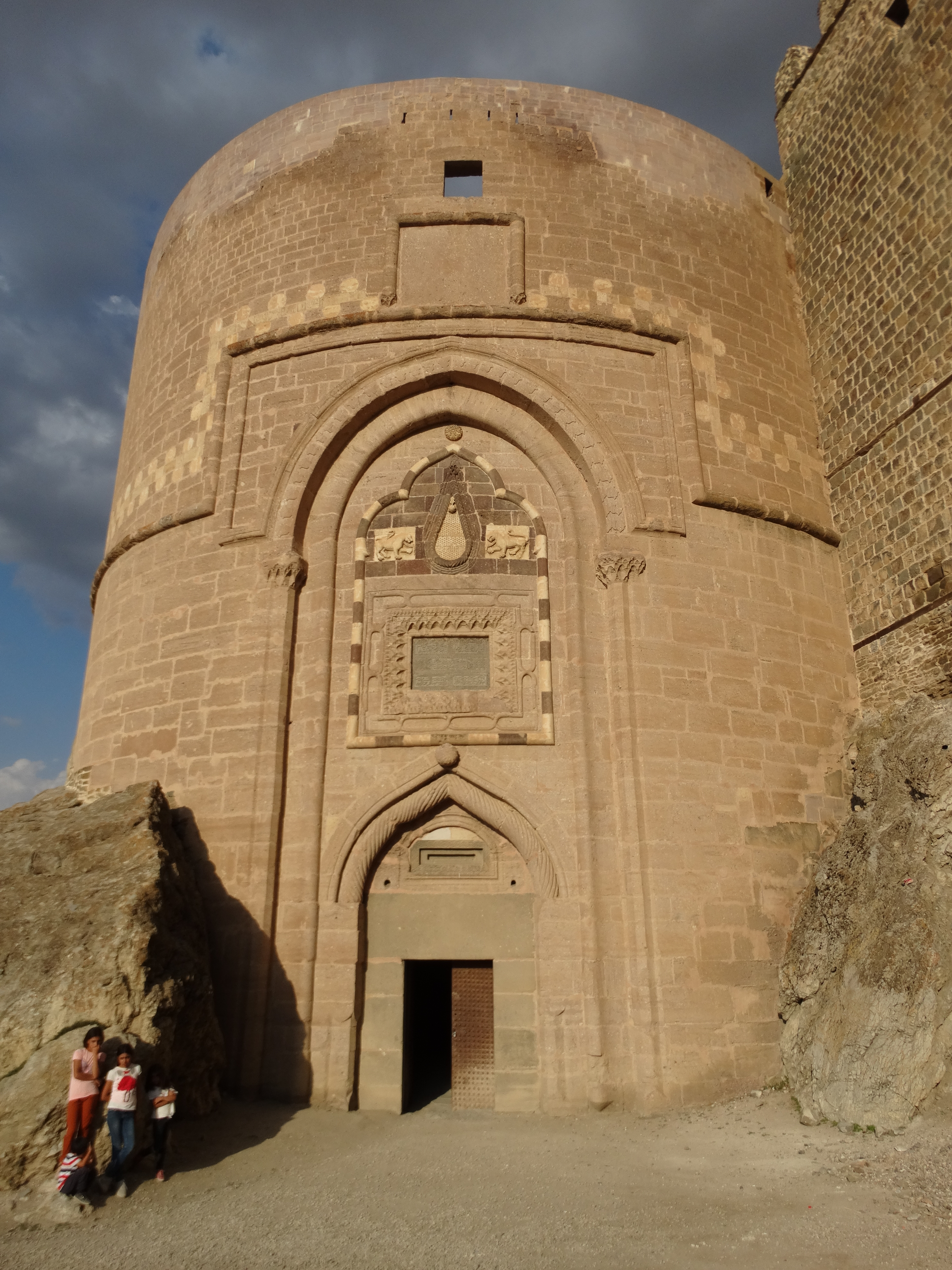

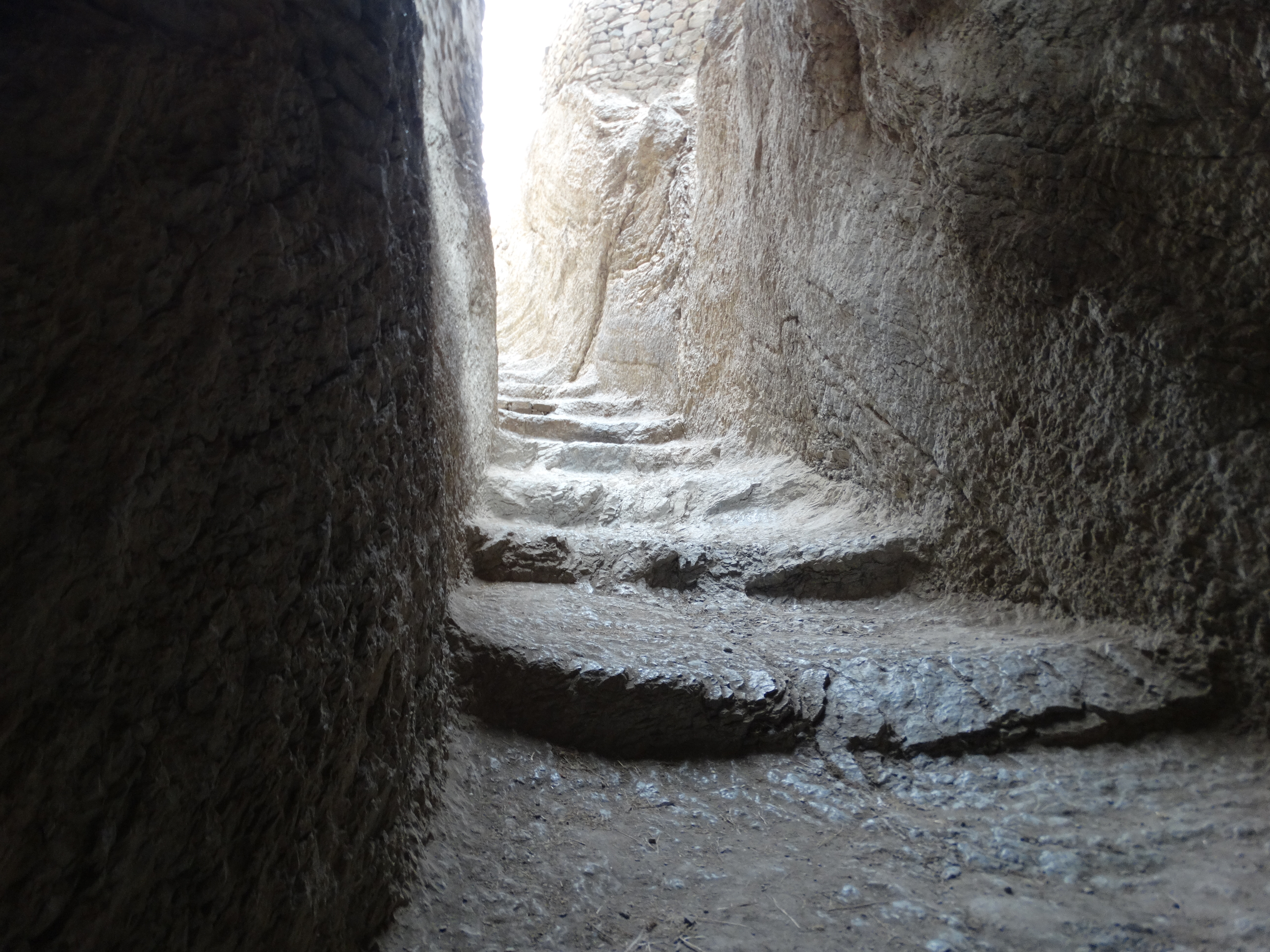

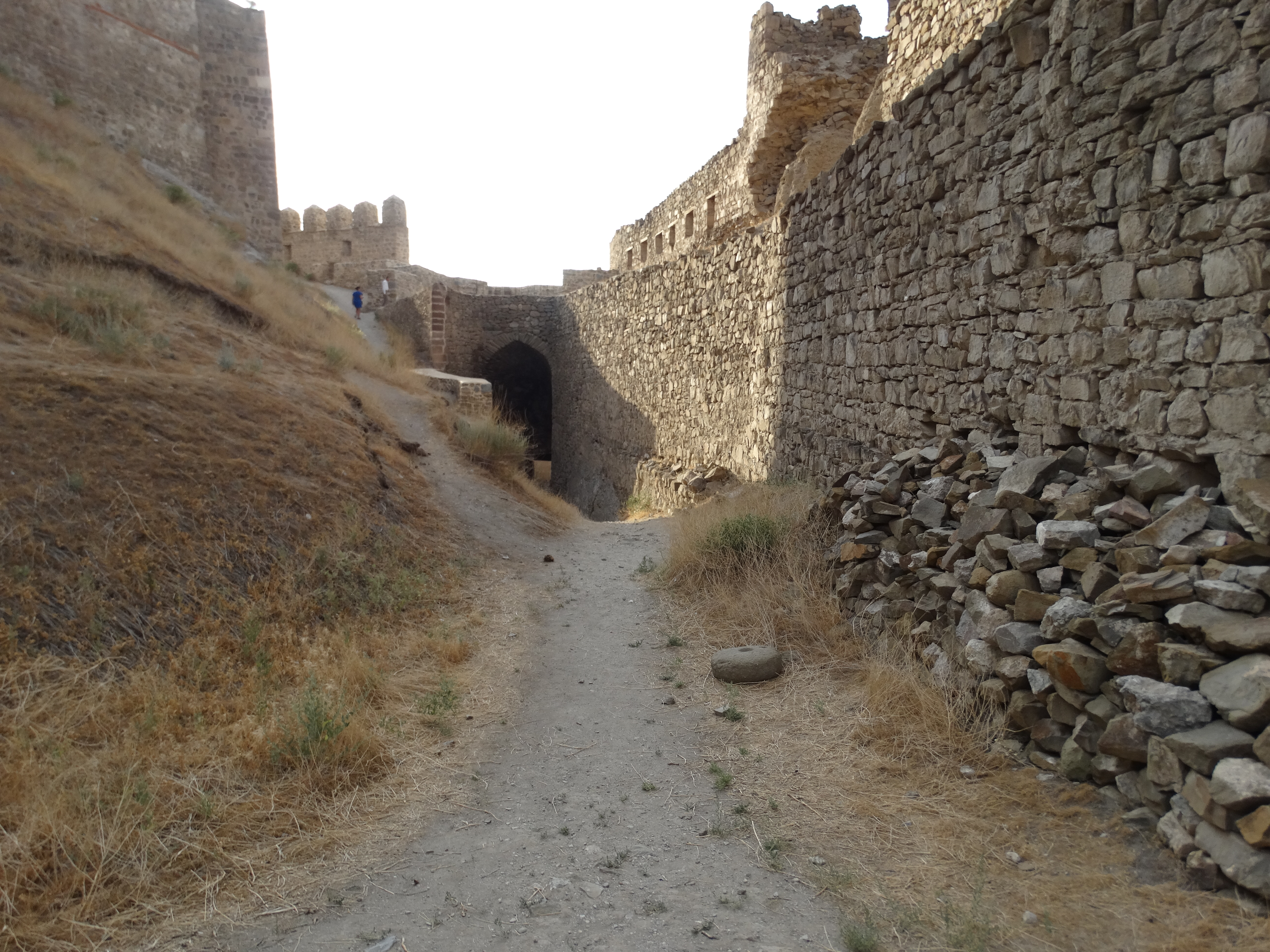

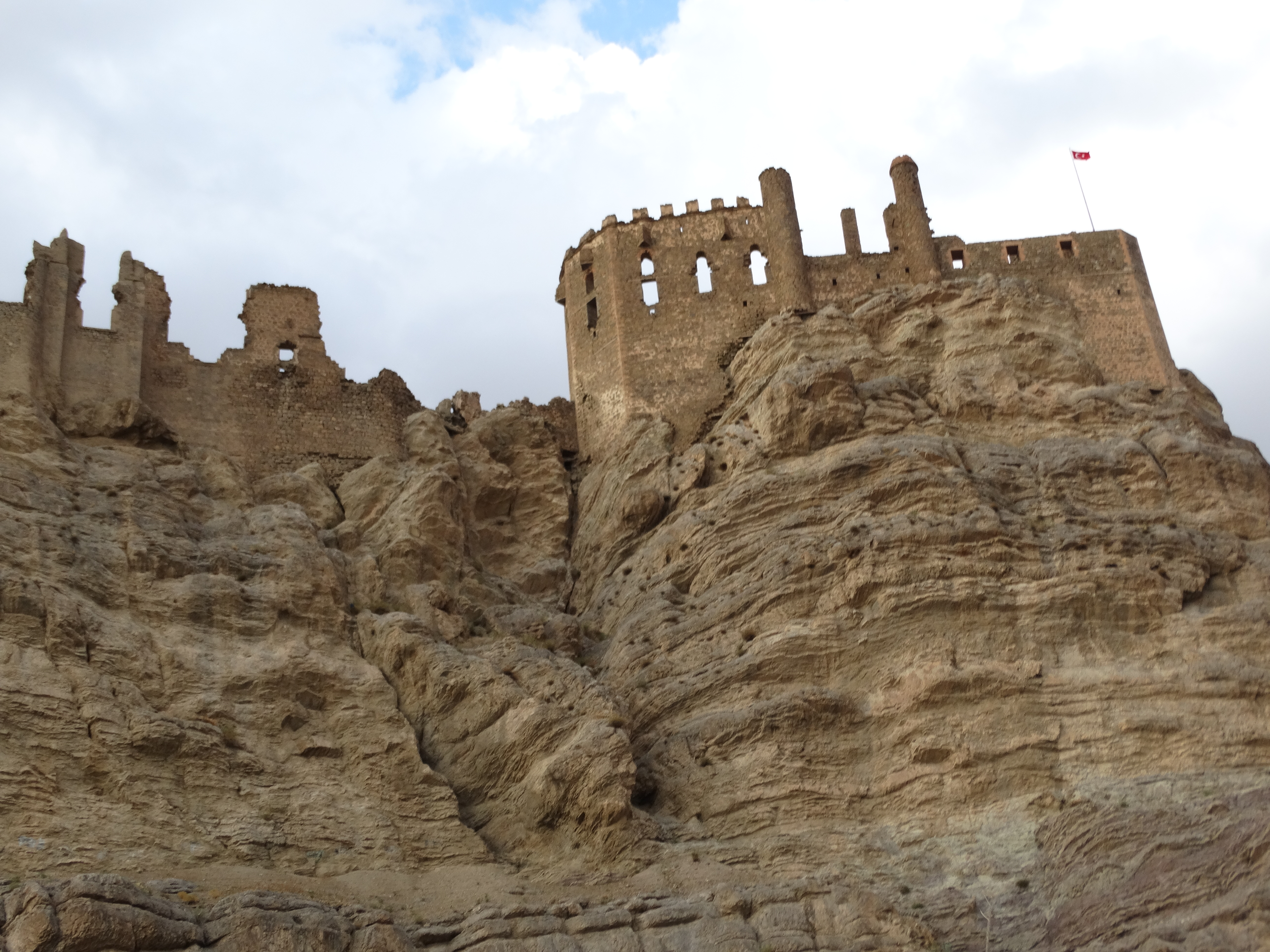

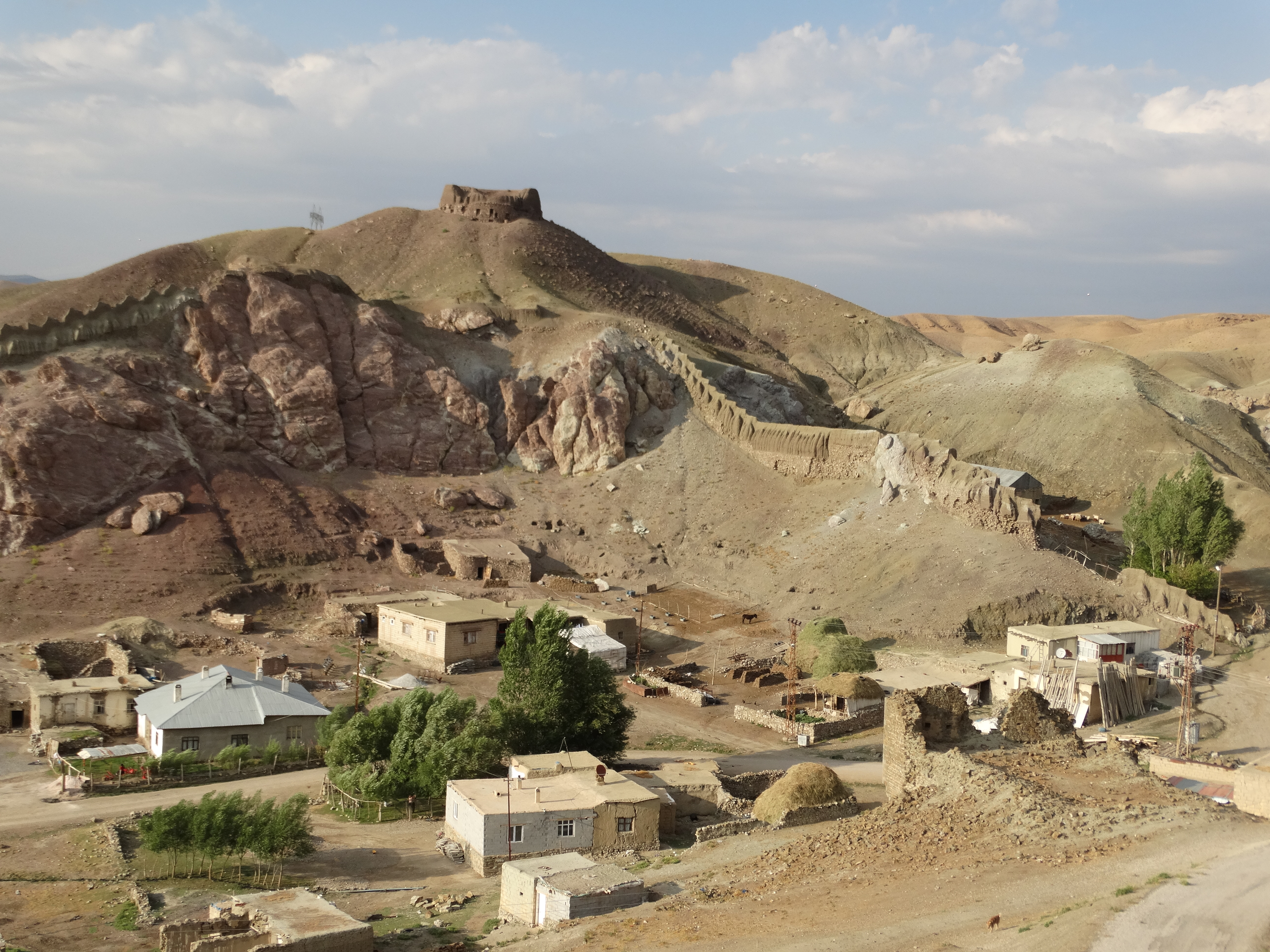

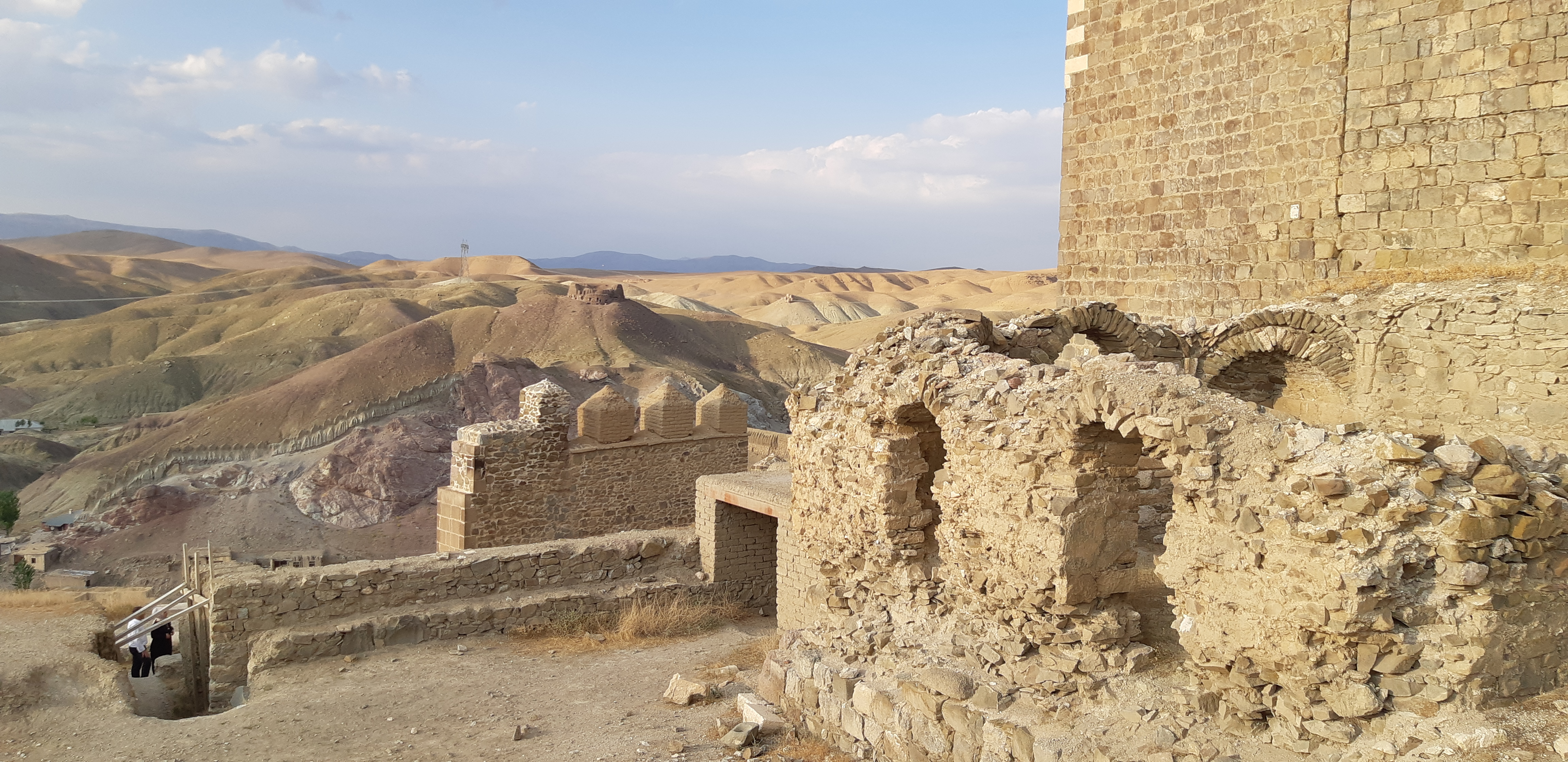

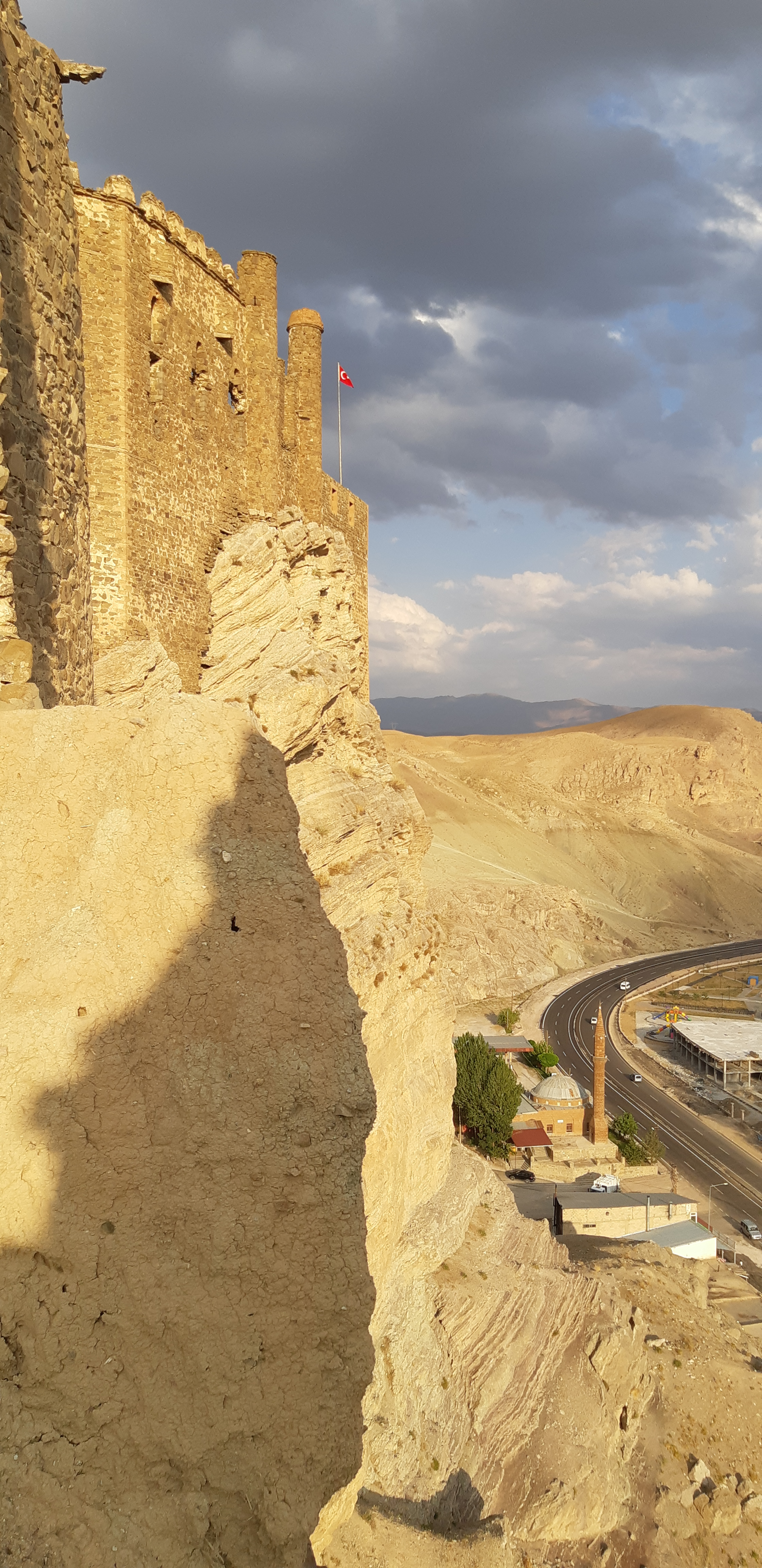

== See also ==
- List of Kurdish castles
- List of castles in Turkey
