= List of mountains in Turkey =

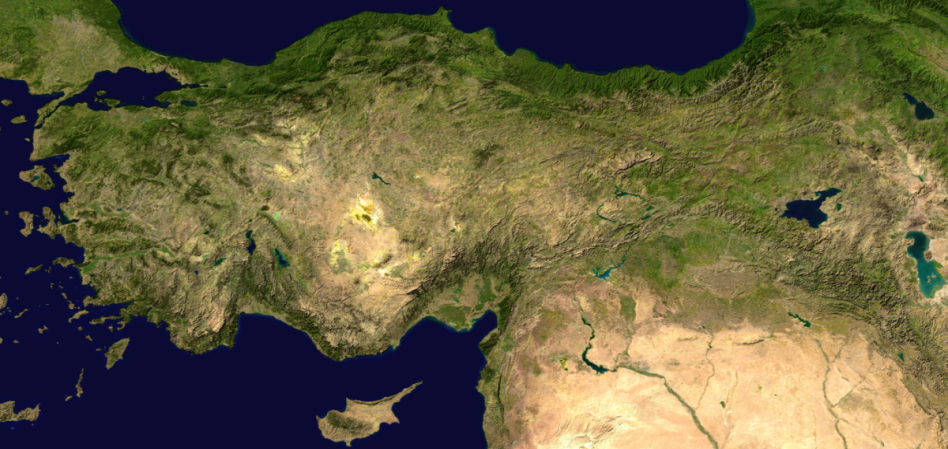
Geographic view of Turkey

Mountain ranges and tectonic faults of Turkey

== Mountain ranges of Türkiye ==
- Armenian Highlands range across Eastern Turkey including Agri (Ararat)
- Taurus Mountains range across southern Turkey between the coast and the Anatolian Plateau. Subranges include
  - Akdağlar (or White Mountains) are in the south-western
  - Beydağlar (or Bey Mountains)
  - Tahtalı Mountain Range south west Anatolia
- Anti-Taurus Mountains (Aladağlar) are in southern and eastern Turkey
  - Cilo-Sat Mountains are the eastern extension of the Taurus Mountains and are in Hakkari province
  - Nur Mountains (South Anatolia)
- Pontic Mountains (in Turkish, Kuzey Anadolu Dağları, meaning North Anatolian Mountains) range along the southern coast of the Black Sea in northern Turkey
  - Kaçkar Mountains form the eastern end of the Pontic Mountains
  - Köroğlu Mountains (Northwest Anatolia)
- Yıldız Mountains (Istranca or Strandzha) are in the European part of Turkey and in Bulgaria
- Sultan Mountains on the western edge of the Anatolian Plateau
- Yalnızçam Mountains in the Eastern Anatolia region
- Akdoğan Mountains in the Eastern Anatolia region

== Mountains of Turkey ==
List of Mountains in Turkey
Name	Altitude	Mountain Range	Coordinates
Büyük Ağrı (Mount Ararat)	5,137 m (16,854 ft)	Ağrı (Armenian Highlands)	39°42′09″N 44°18′00″E
Gelyansın or Uludoruk (Reşko Tepesi)	4,134 m (13,563 ft)	Cilo-Sat	37°29′09″N 44°00′18″E
Suppa Durek	4,060 m (13,320 ft) m	Cilo-Sat	37°29′53.1″N 43°57′33.5″E
Süphan	4,058 m (13,314 ft)	Armenian Highlands	38°55′54″N 42°50′03″E
Bobek Tepesi	3,980 m (13,060 ft)	Cilo-Sat	37°31′32.5″N 43°48′57.2″E
Köşe Doruğu or Çîyayê Sırebıri	3,980 m (13,060 ft)	Cilo-Sat	37°30′42.3″N 43°58′14.5″E
Kaçkar Dağı highest peak in Kaçkarlar	3,932 m (12,900 ft)	Kaçkarlar	40°50′12″N 41°09′48″E
Köşe Direği or Çîyayê Sırê	3,932 m (12,900 ft)	Cilo-Sat	37°30′15.5″N 43°57′11.5″E
Erciyes (Mount Erciyes)	3,916 m (12,848 ft)	Central Anatolia Region	38°32′06″N 35°27′03″E
Kurt Dağı or Zinarê Zêr (or Kısare/Kop Dağı)	3,904 m (12,808 ft)	Cilo-Sat	37°30′08.4″N 43°52′05.1″E
Poyraz Dağı	3,900 m (12,800 ft)	Cilo-Sat	37°30′31.1″N 44°00′12.4″E
Küçük Ağrı (Lesser Ararat, Little Ararat, Mount Sis)	3,896 m (12,782 ft)	Ağrı Armenian Highlands	39°39′N 44°24′E
Handeyade (Catalkaya, Samdi)	3,794 m (12,448 ft)	Cilo-Sat	37°19′N 44°15′E
Kızılkaya Highest Peak in Anti-Taurus Mountains (Aladağlar)	3,767 m (12,359 ft)	Aladağlar	
Büyük Demirkazık (Greater Demirkazık)	3,756 m (12,323 ft)	Aladağlar	37°47′51″N 35°09′33″E
Kısara	3,752 m (12,310 ft)	Cilo-Sat	
Mazanı	3,725 m (12,221 ft)	Cilo-Sat	
Emler	3,723 m (12,215 ft)	Aladağlar	37°48′23″N 35°08′55″E
Verçenik	3,711 m (12,175 ft)	Kaçkarlar	
Kaldı	3,688 m (12,100 ft)	Aladağlar	
Başet Tepesi (Gürpınar, Van)	3,684 m (12,087 ft)	İhtiyar Şahap Mountains	
Şilan Mountains	3,670 m (12,040 ft)	Cilo-Sat	
Kızılyar	3,654 m (11,988 ft)	Aladağlar	
Gürtepe	3,630 m (11,910 ft)	Aladağlar	
Sematepe	3,623 m (11,886 ft)	Aladağlar	
Çağalın Başı	3,612 m (11,850 ft)	Aladağlar	
Mount Tendürek	3,584 m (11,759 ft)		
Torasan	3,584 m (11,759 ft)	Aladağlar	
Alaca (Lorut)	3,582 m (11,752 ft)	Aladağlar	
Vayvay	3,563 m (11,690 ft)	Aladağlar	
Bulut	3,562 m (11,686 ft)	Kaçkarlar	
Eznevit	3,560 m (11,680 ft)	Aladağlar	
Karasay	3,550 m (11,650 ft)	Aladağlar	
Mount Artos	3,550 m (11,650 ft)	İhtiyar Şahap Mountains	
Boruklu	3,548 m (11,640 ft)	Aladağlar	
Gevaruk	3,540 m (11,610 ft)	Cilo-Sat	
Çandır Dağı	3,537 m (11,604 ft)		
Güngörmez	3,536 m (11,601 ft)	Kaçkarlar	
Sulağankaya	3,530 m (11,580 ft)	Aladağlar	
Soğanlı Dağ	3,527 m (11,572 ft)	Kaçkarlar	
Medetsiz Highest peak in Bolkar Mountains	3,524 m (11,562 ft)	Bolkar Mountains	
unnamed near Çağalın Başı	3,517 m (11,539 ft)	Aladağlar	
Direktaş	3,510 m (11,520 ft)	Aladağlar	
Orta Dağ	3,500 m (11,500 ft)	Aladağlar	
Karataş	3,495 m (11,467 ft)	Kaçkarlar	
Keşif	3,475 m (11,401 ft)	Bolkar Mountains	
Cebelbaşı	3,474 m (11,398 ft)	Aladağlar	
Liblin Tepe	3,472 m (11,391 ft)	Kaçkarlar	
Karasay	3,472 m (11,391 ft)	Aladağlar	
Güzeller	3,461 m (11,355 ft)	Aladağlar	
Kösedağ Dağı	3,433 m (11,263 ft)		39°53′43″N 42°38′37″E
Sıyırmalık	3,426 m (11,240 ft)	Aladağlar	
Tearzin	3,415 m (11,204 ft)	Cilo-Sat	
Küçük Demirkazık	3,400 m (11,200 ft)	Aladağlar	
Tahtakaya	3,372 m (11,063 ft)	Bolkar Mountains	
Didvake	3,350 m (10,990 ft)	Kaçkarlar	
Büyük Dağ Tepe	3,328 m (10,919 ft)	Kaçkarlar	
Sat Başı	3,302 m (10,833 ft)	Cilo-Sat	
Altıparmak	3,301 m (10,830 ft)	Kaçkarlar	
Marsis	3,300 m (10,800 ft)	Kaçkarlar	
Kardal	3,300 m (10,800 ft)	Cilo-Sat	
Hasan Dağı	3,253 m (10,673 ft)		38°08′N 34°11′E
Mescit Mountains	3,239 m (10,627 ft)		
Bingöl Mountains	3,193 m (10,476 ft)		39°21′35″N 41°22′56″E
Büyük Ejder	3,176 m (10,420 ft)		
Erek Dağı	3,175 m (10,417 ft)		38°28′N 43°30′E
Kargapazarı Mountains	3,169 m (10,397 ft)		
Nurhak Dağı	3,081 m (10,108 ft)		
Kızlar Sivrisi	3,069 m (10,069 ft)	Beydağları	
Çakmak Mountain	3,063 m (10,049 ft)		
Nemrut	3,050 m (10,010 ft)		39°25′N 41°31′E
Akdoğan	2,879 m (9,446 ft)	Akdoğan Mountains	39°11′05″N 41°51′42″E
Kösedağ Dağı	2,794 m (9,167 ft)		40°04′38″N 37°58′18″E
Şerafettin	2,675 m (8,776 ft)		39°02′22″N 41°11′57″E
Göztepe	2,594 m (8,510 ft)	Akdoğan Mountains	39°06′46″N 41°50′47″E
Büyükhacet Tepe	2,587 m (8,488 ft)	Ilgaz Mountains	
Mount Honaz	2,571 m (8,435 ft)		
Uludağ	2,543 m (8,343 ft)		40°04′10″N 29°13′17″E
Köroğlu Peak	2,499 m (8,199 ft)	Köroğlu Mountains	
Cemalverdi Mountains	2,438 m (7,999 ft)		39°18′09″N 42°37′32″E
Tahtalı	2,366 m (7,762 ft)	Beydağları	36°32′13″N 30°26′31″E
Ahır	2,344 m (7,690 ft)	Southeastern Taurus Mountains	37.65°N 37.03°E
Murat Mountain	2,312 m (7,585 ft)		
Karadağ	2,271 m (7,451 ft)		37°15′N 33°05′E
Girekol	2,145 m (7,037 ft)		39°06′14″N 43°25′34″E
Şaphane mountain	2,120 m (6,960 ft)		
Yaralıgöz Dağı	2,019 m (6,624 ft)	Küre Mountains	
Kazdağı (Mount Ida)	1,770 m		39°42′N 26°50′E
Spil Dağı	1,517 m (4,977 ft)		
Madra Mountains	1,230 m	Aegean Region	
Mahya Dağı	1,031 m (3,383 ft)	Yıldız Mountains	41°47′N 27°37′E

== Gallery ==
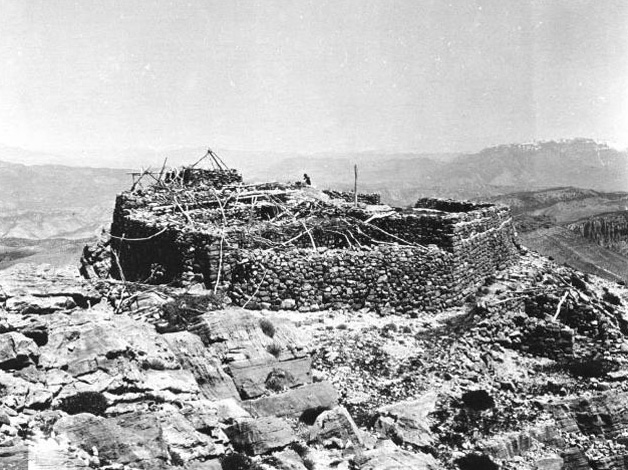
Ruins of a Nestorian church on top of Mount Judi, which is associated with the ark of Nuh or Noah

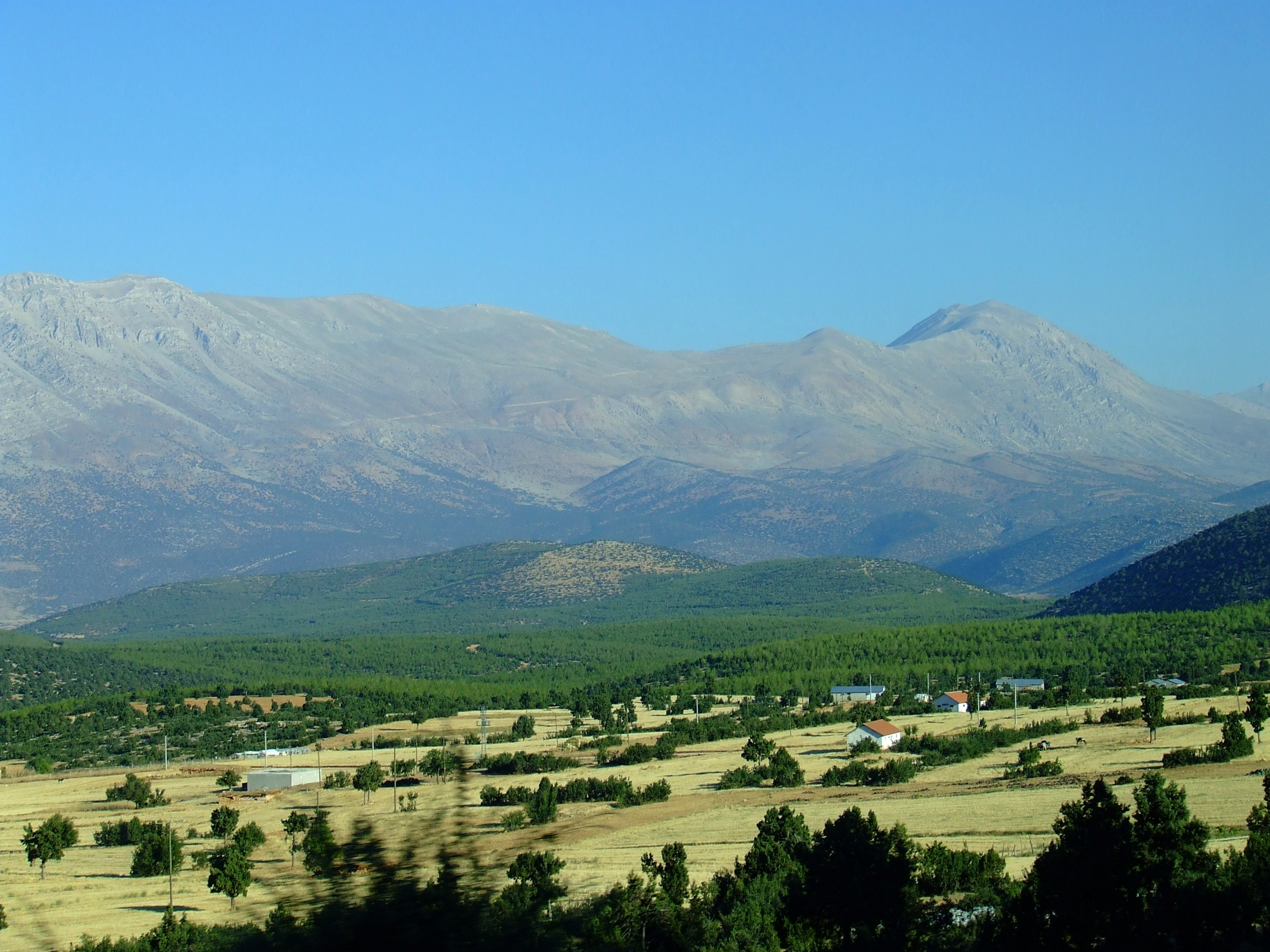
Aegean Region

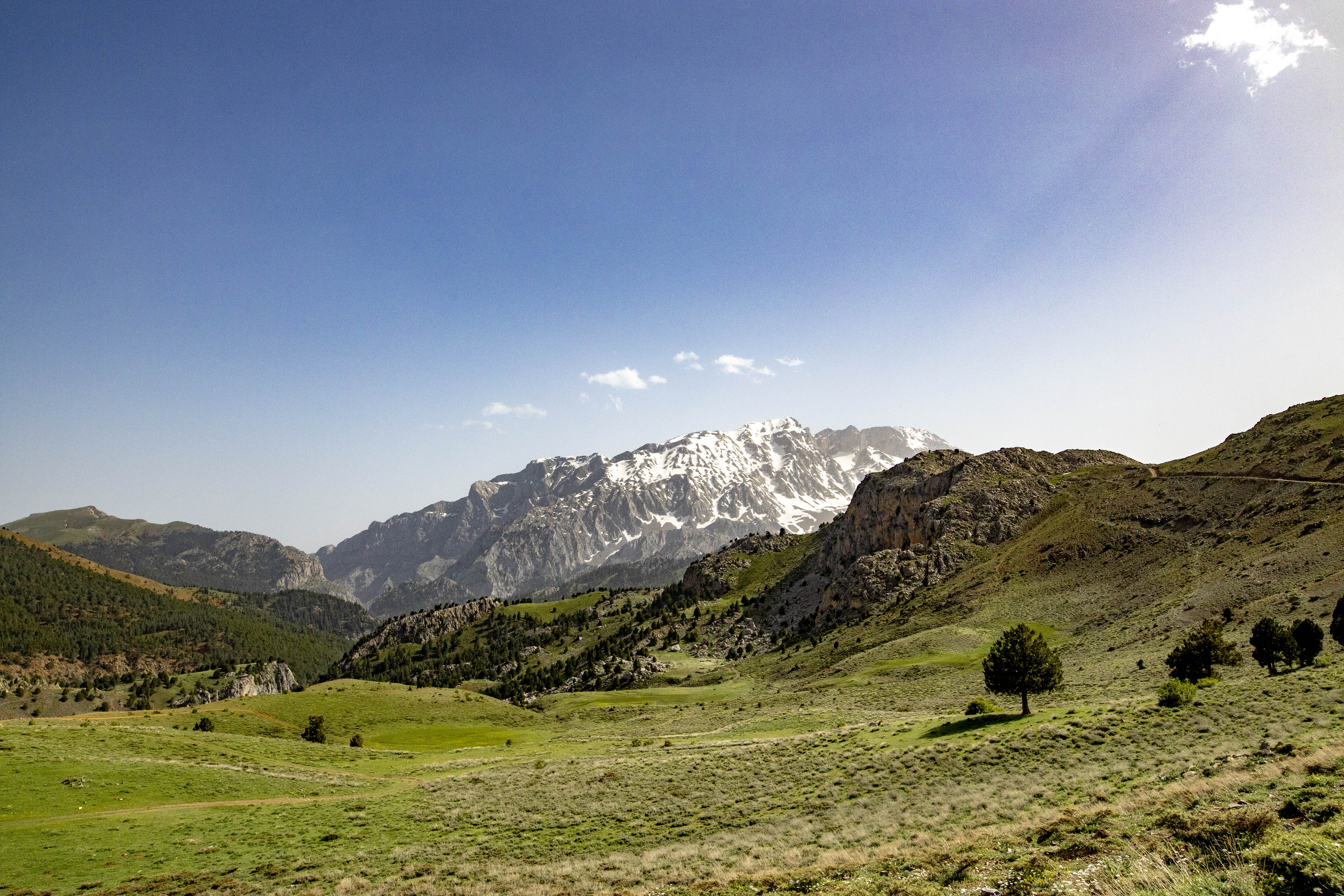
Aladağlar

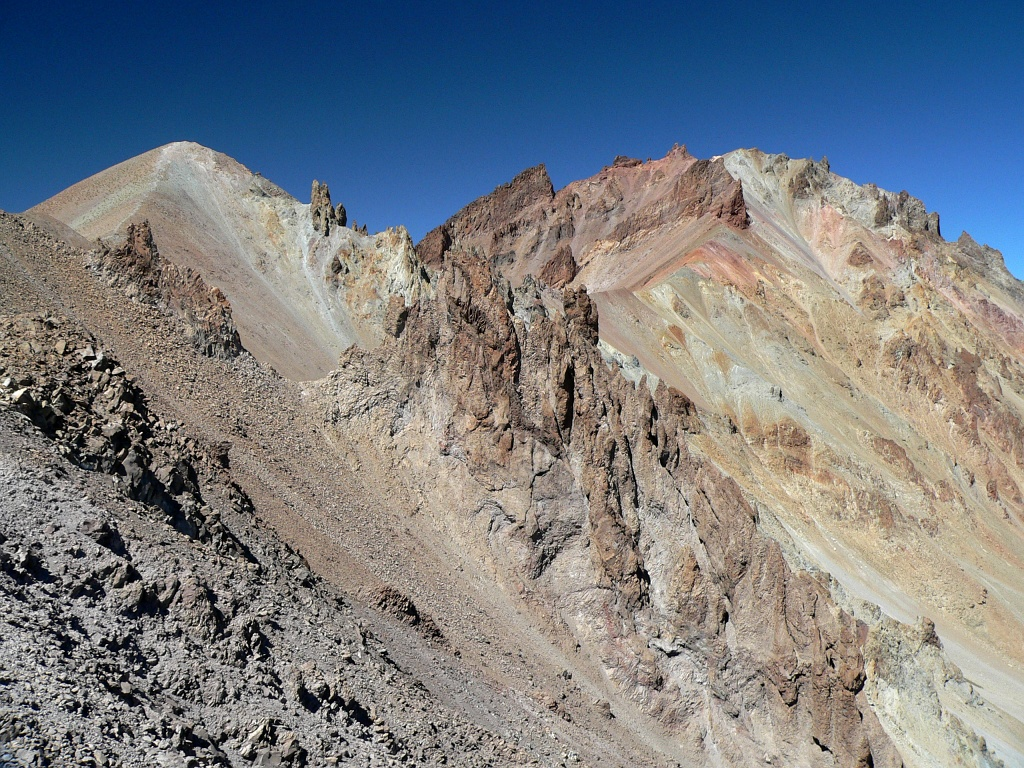
The major ridge and summit of Mount Erciyes

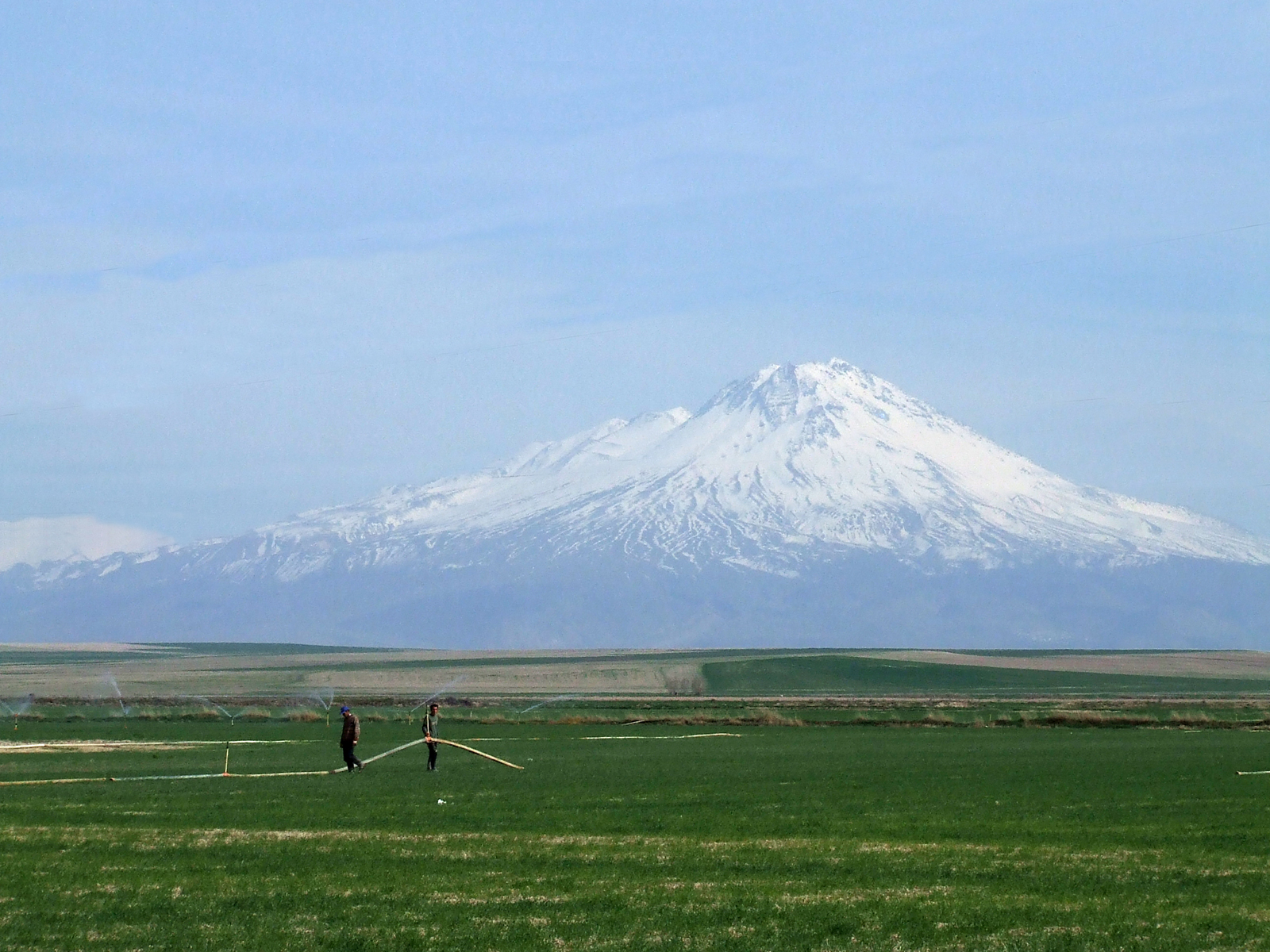
Hasan Dağı, Aksaray

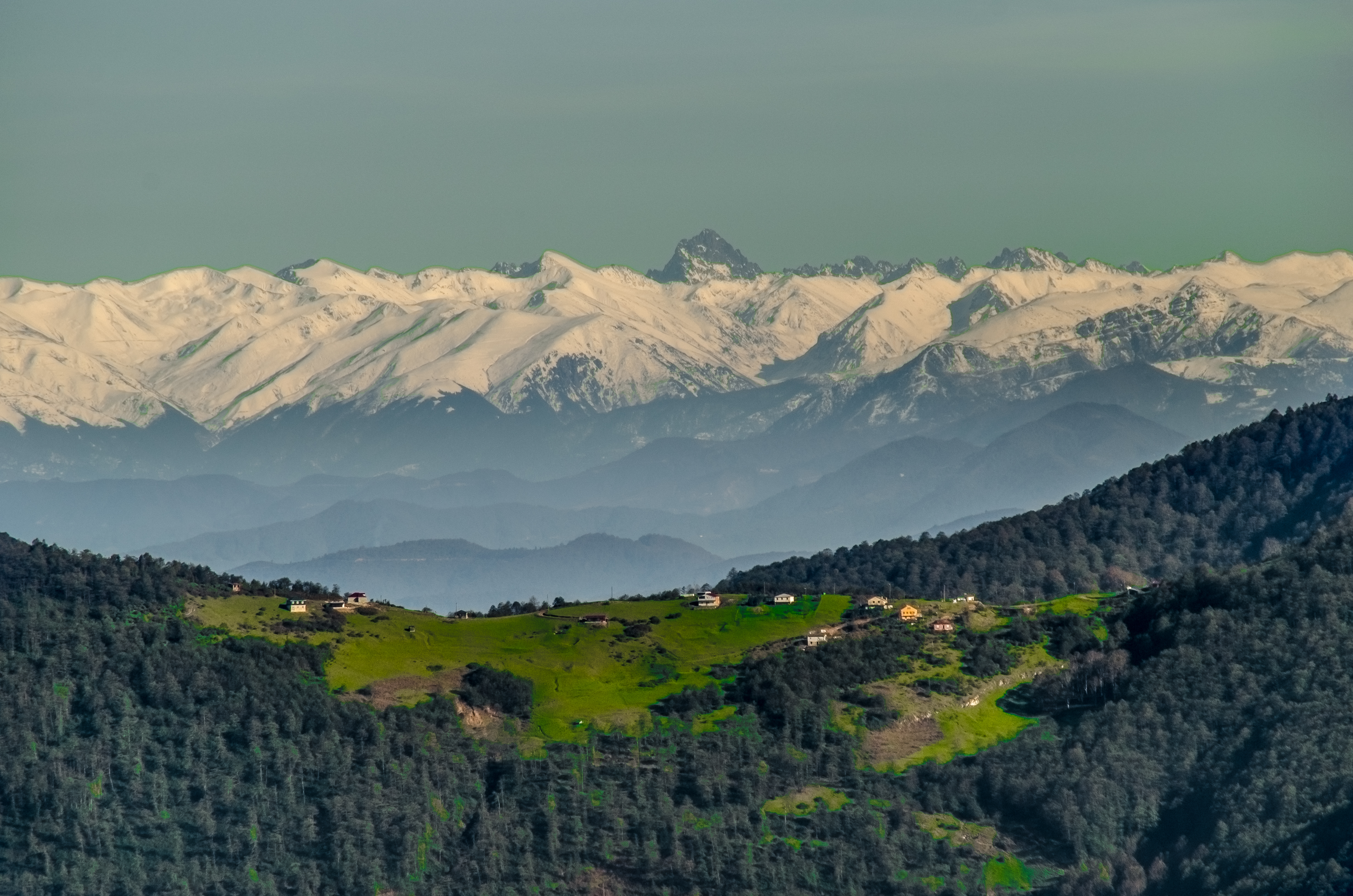
Kaçkar Dağı

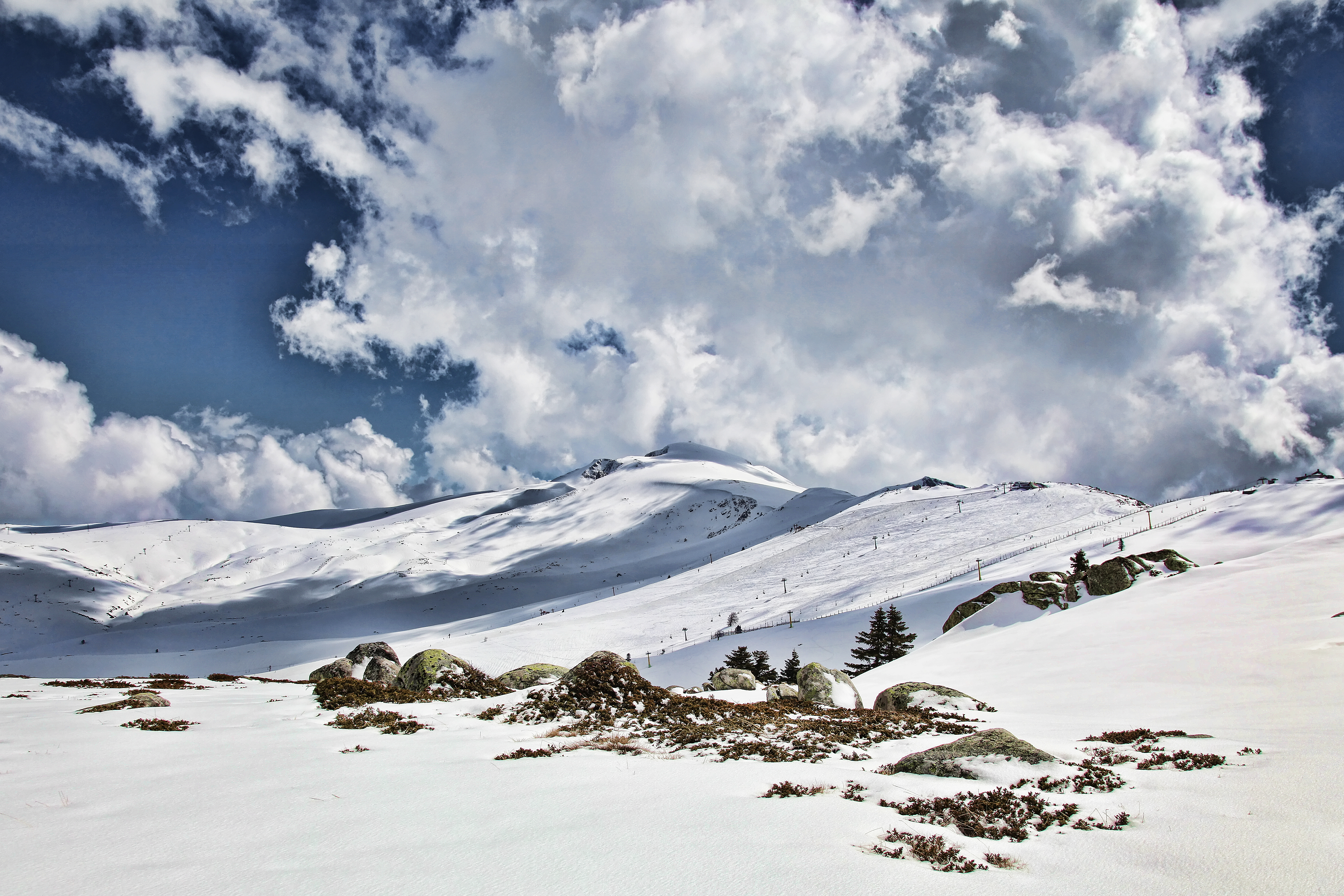
Mount Uludağ

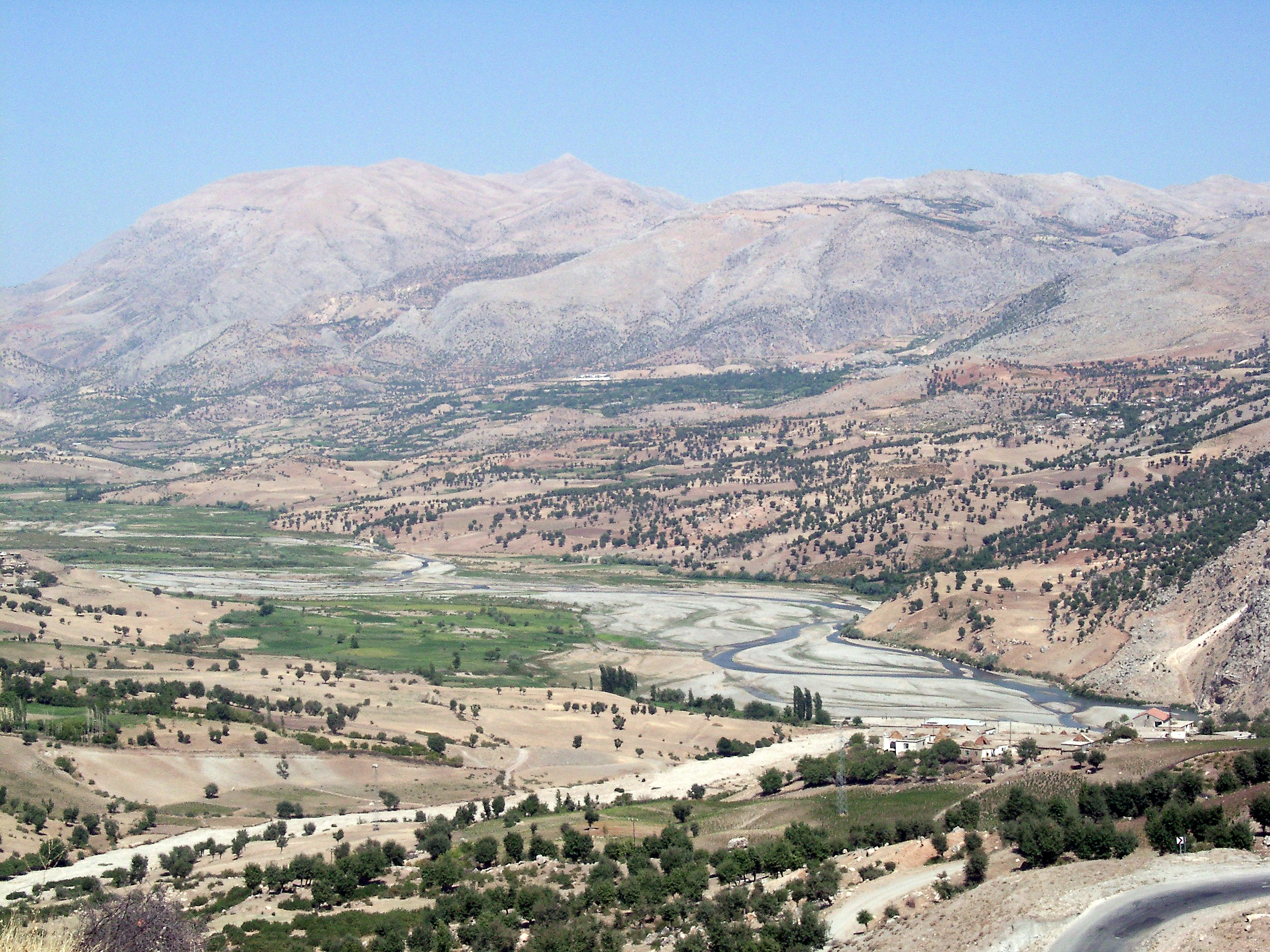
View of Mount Nemrut in Turkey, as the highest point in the picture

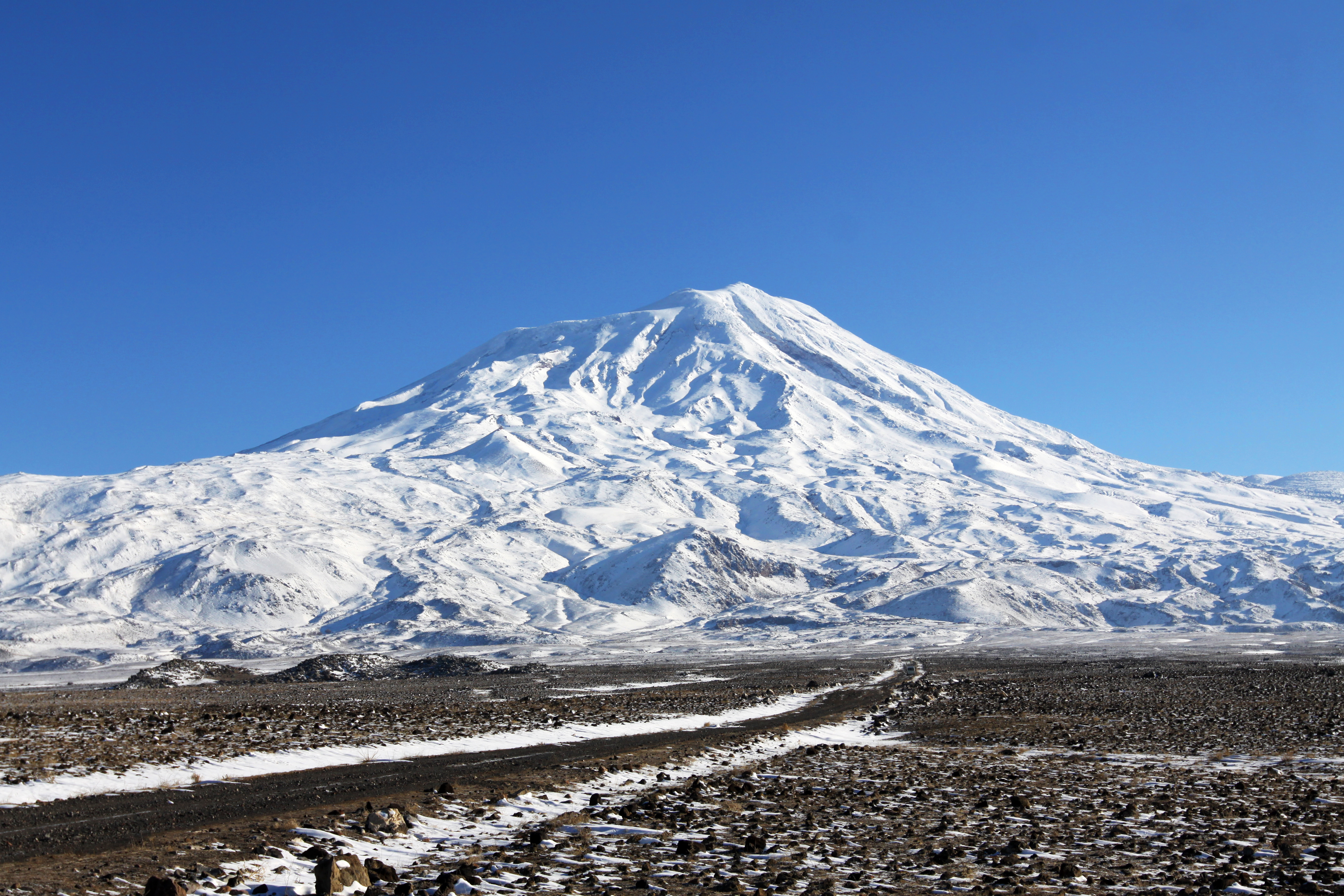
Ararat (Ağrı Dağı)

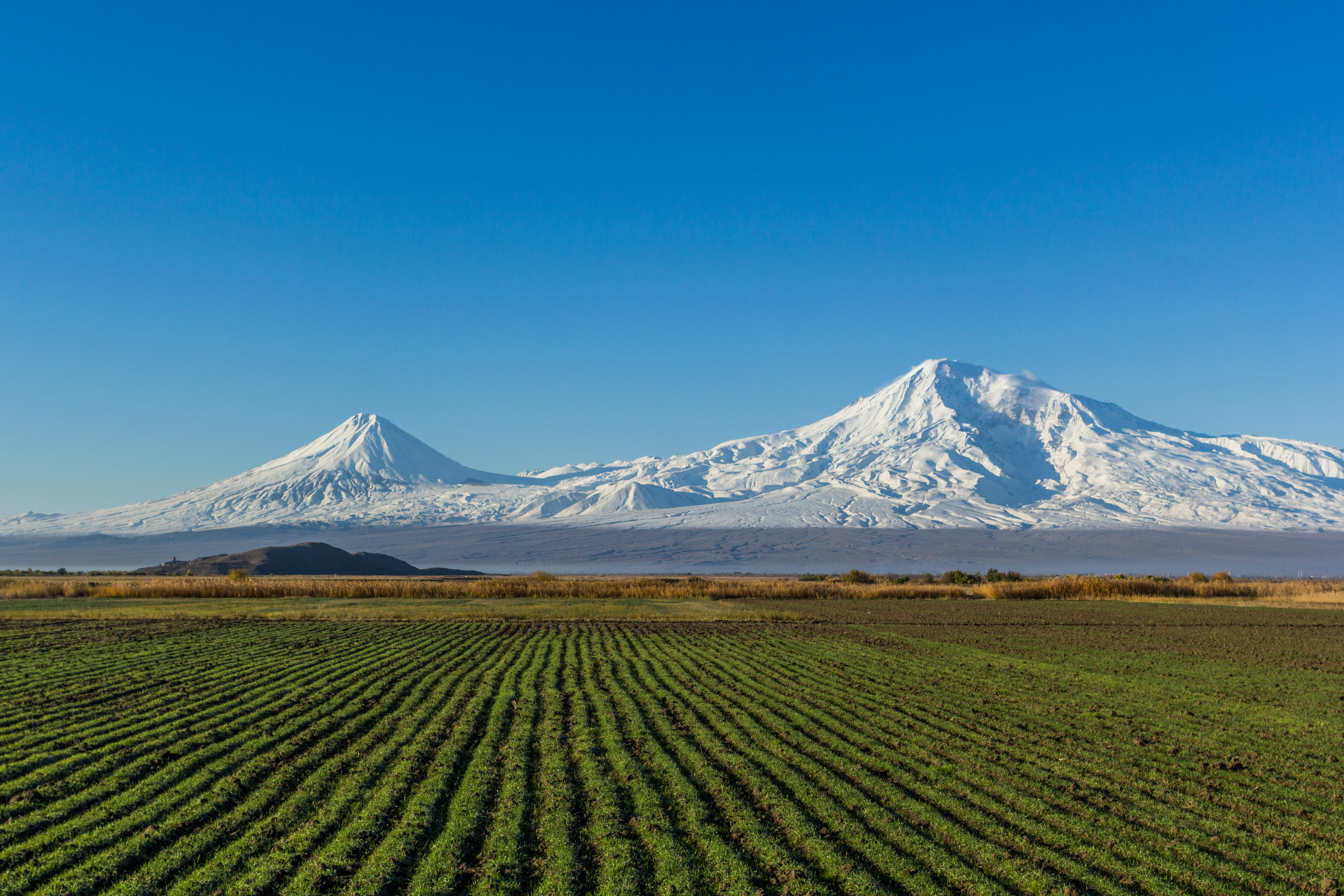
Ararat (Ağrı Dağı)

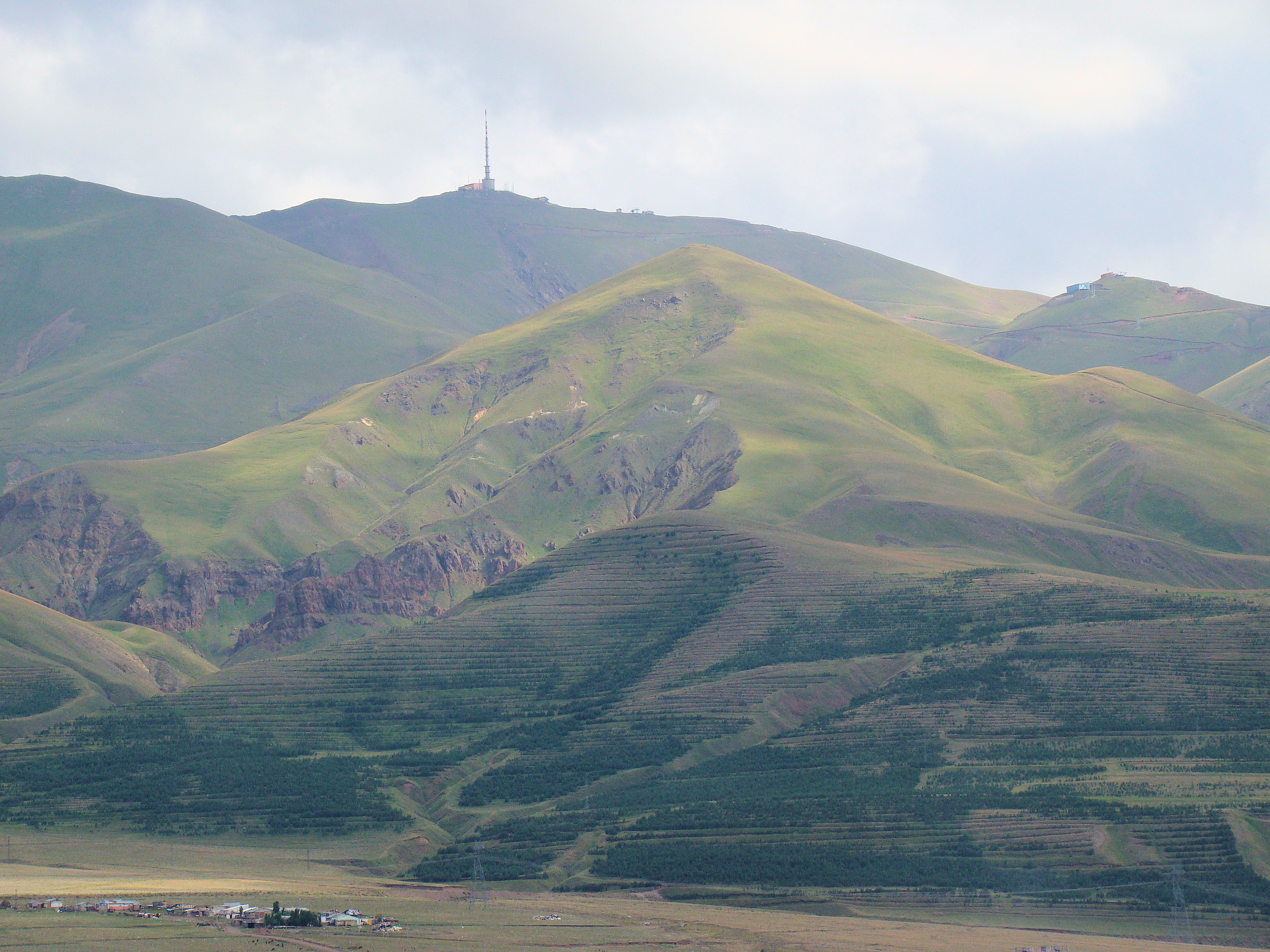
Palandöken Mountain

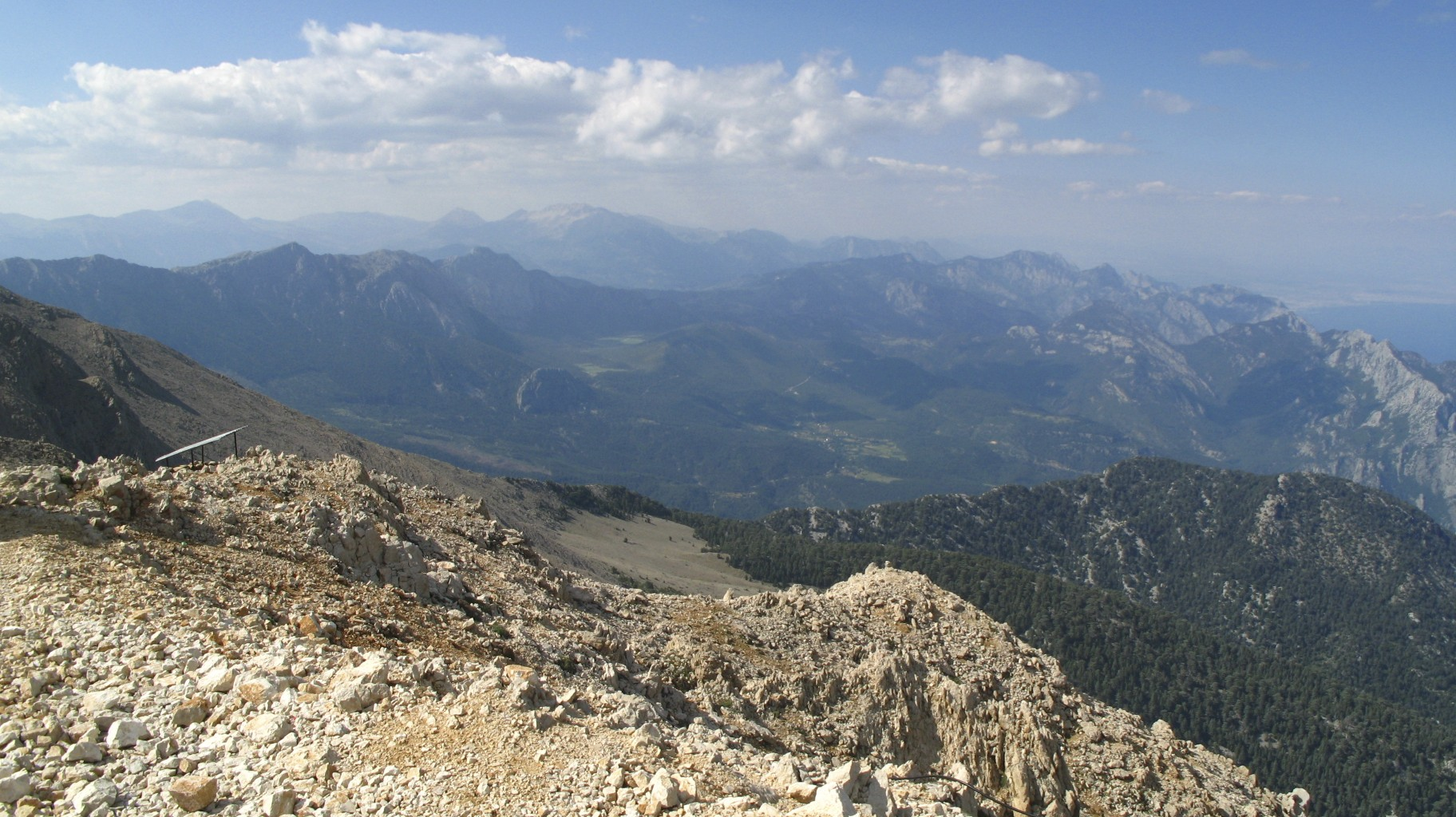
Tahtalı Mountains

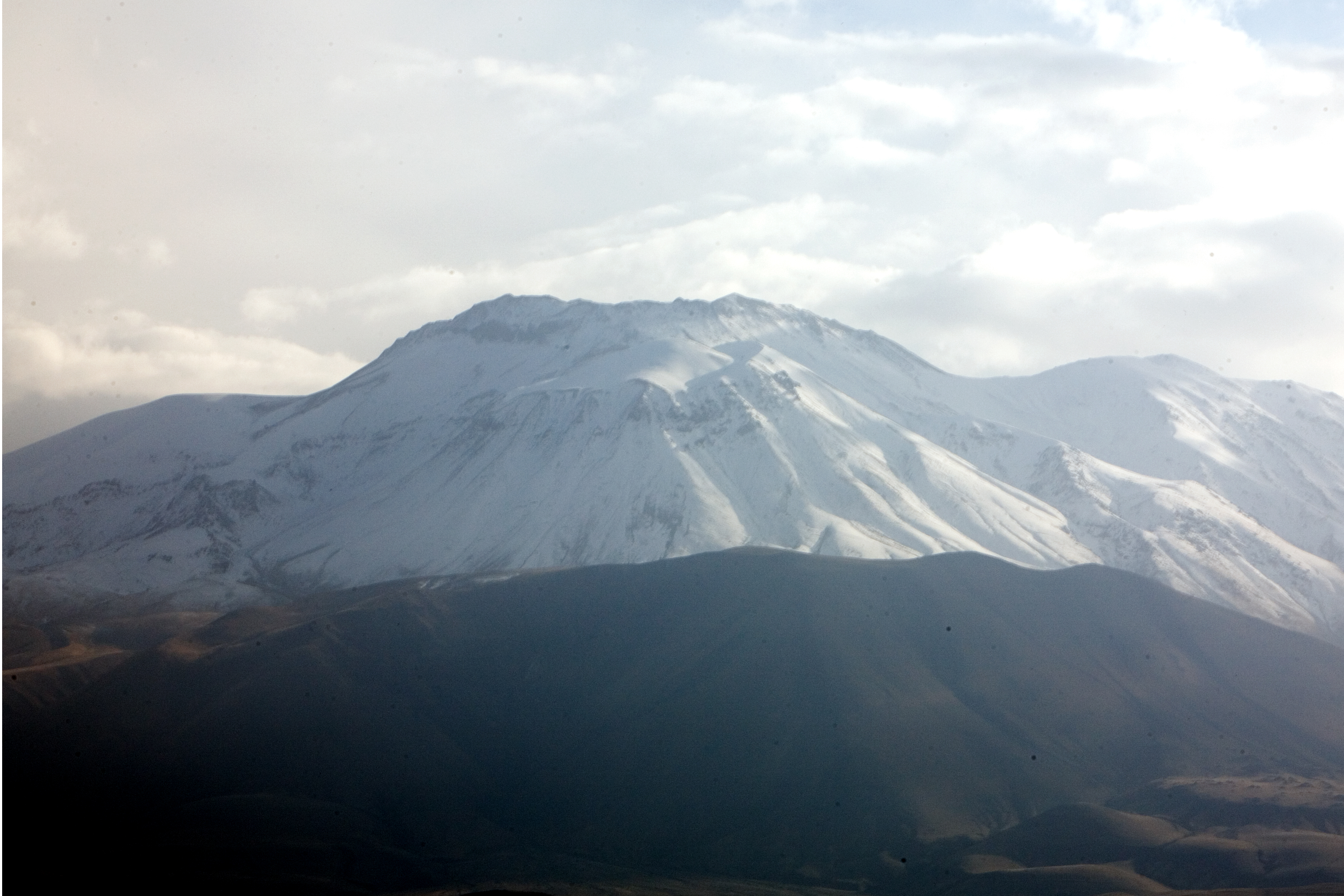
Mount Süphan

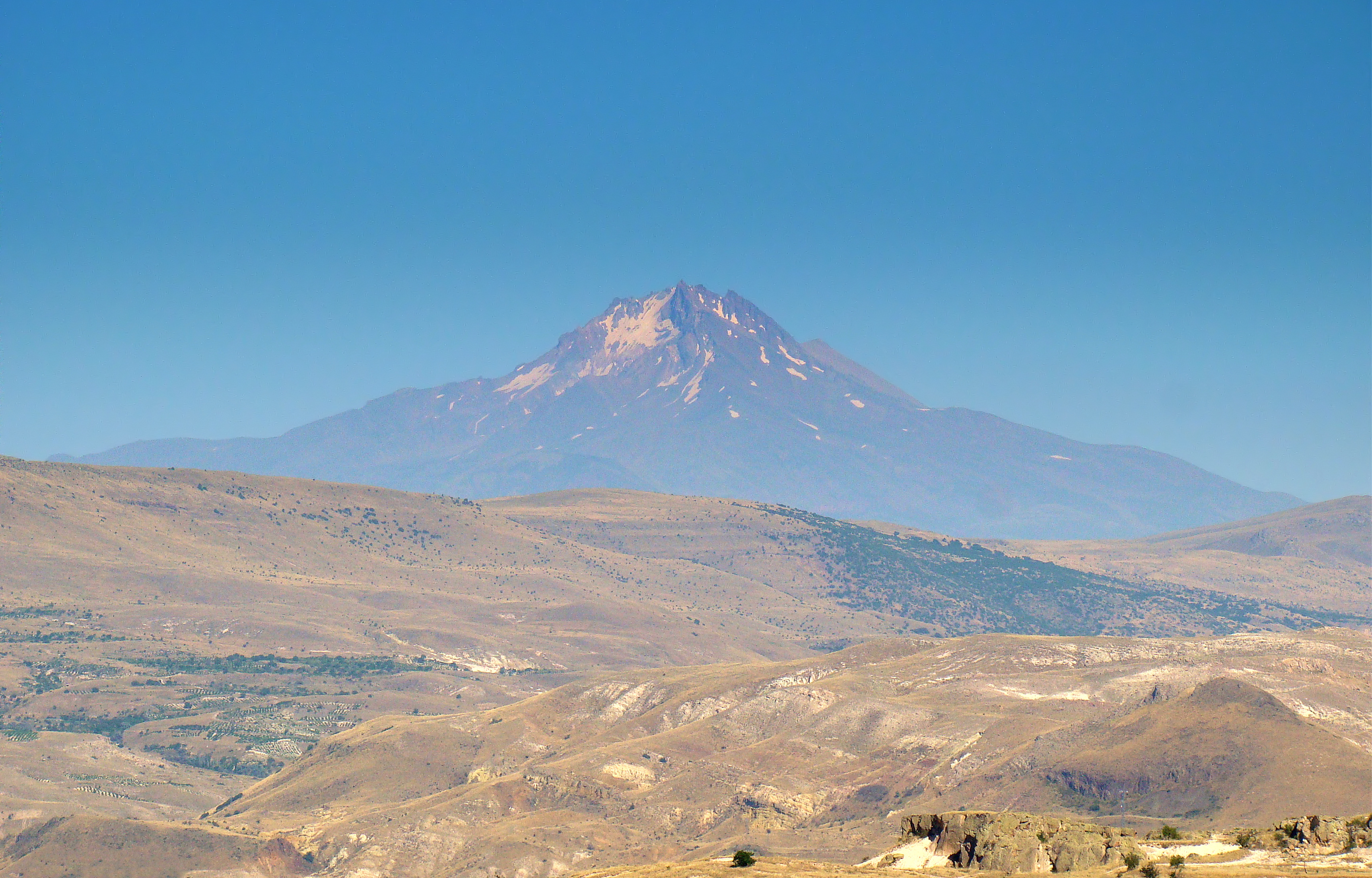
Mount Erciyes

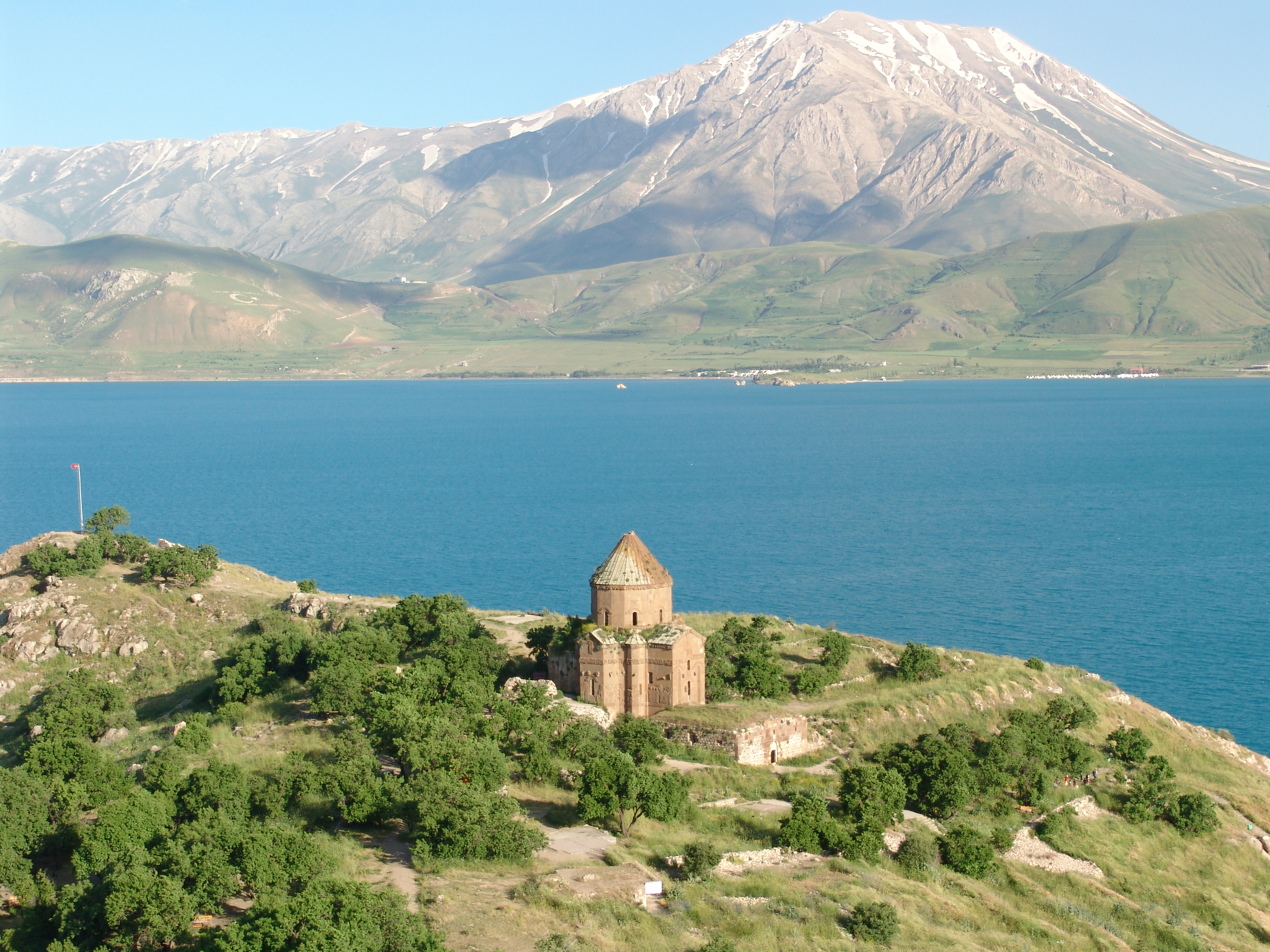
Mount Artos

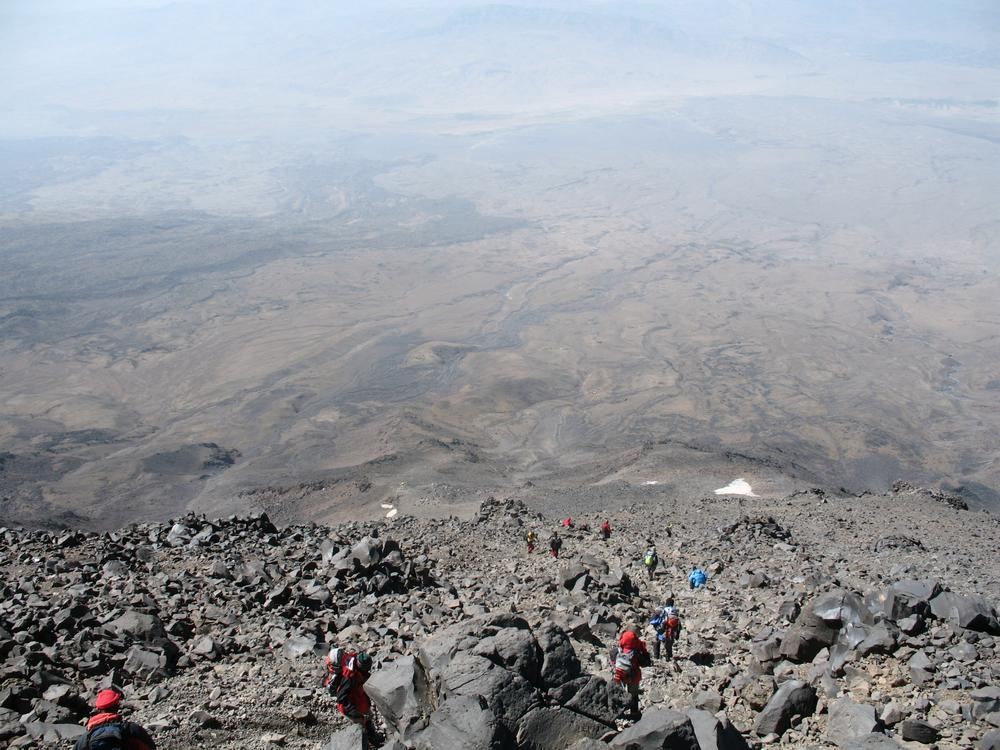
Ararat, Climbing route at 4700 m

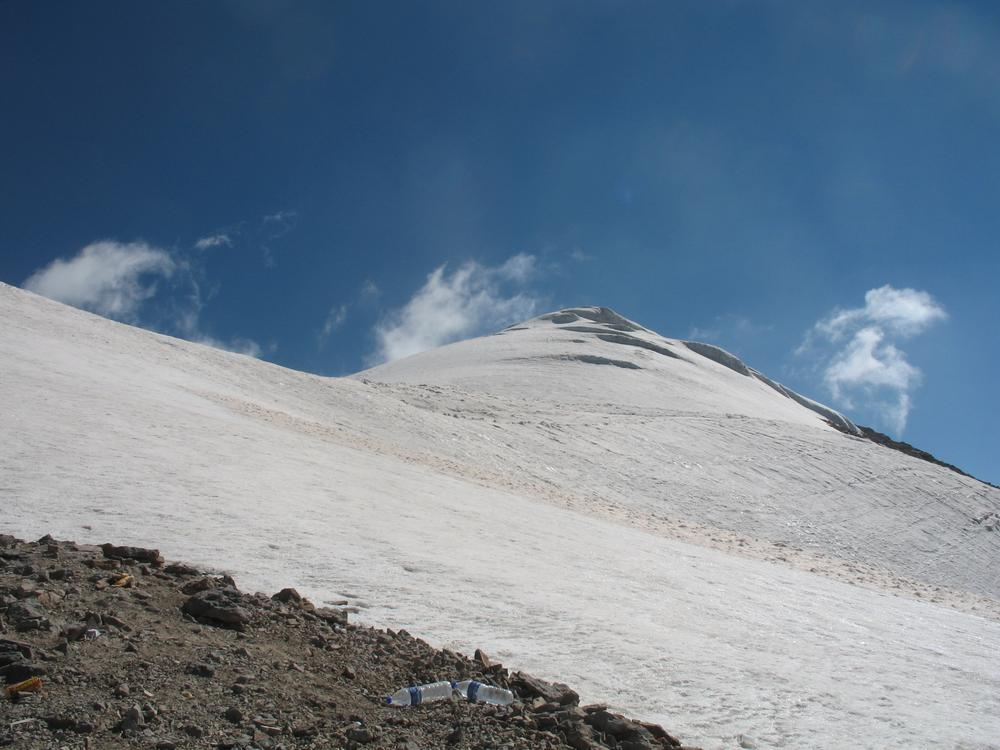
Ararat, View of snow-covered top from 4900 m

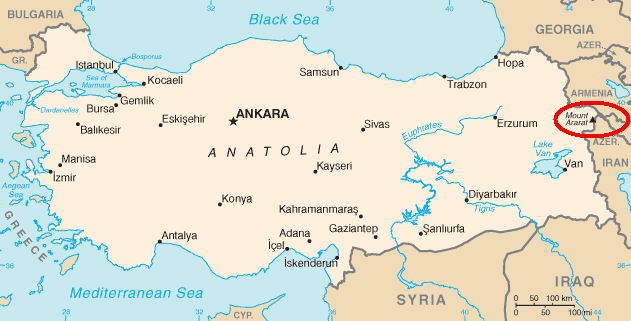
Ararat-Ağrı Dağı, Location

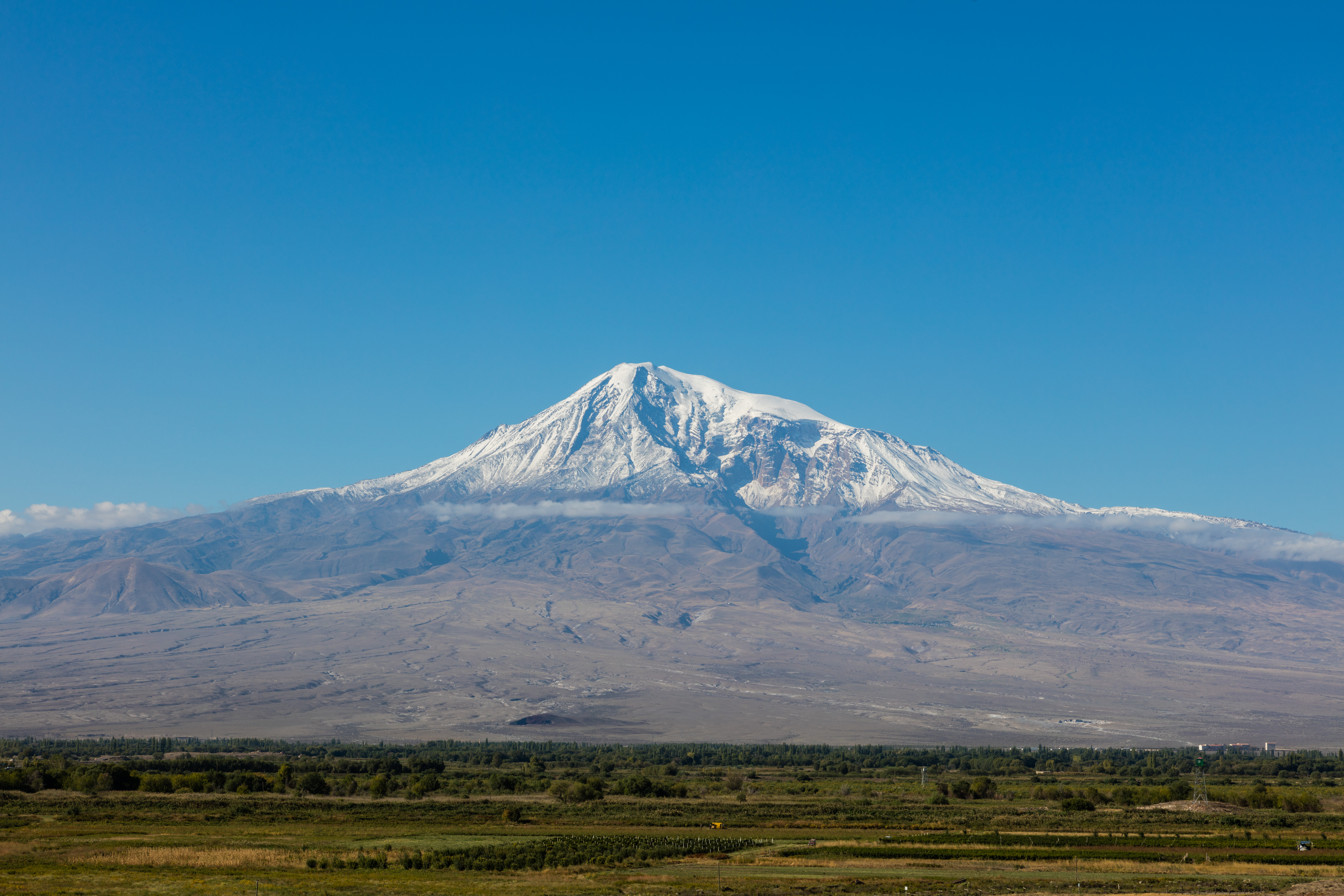
Ararat

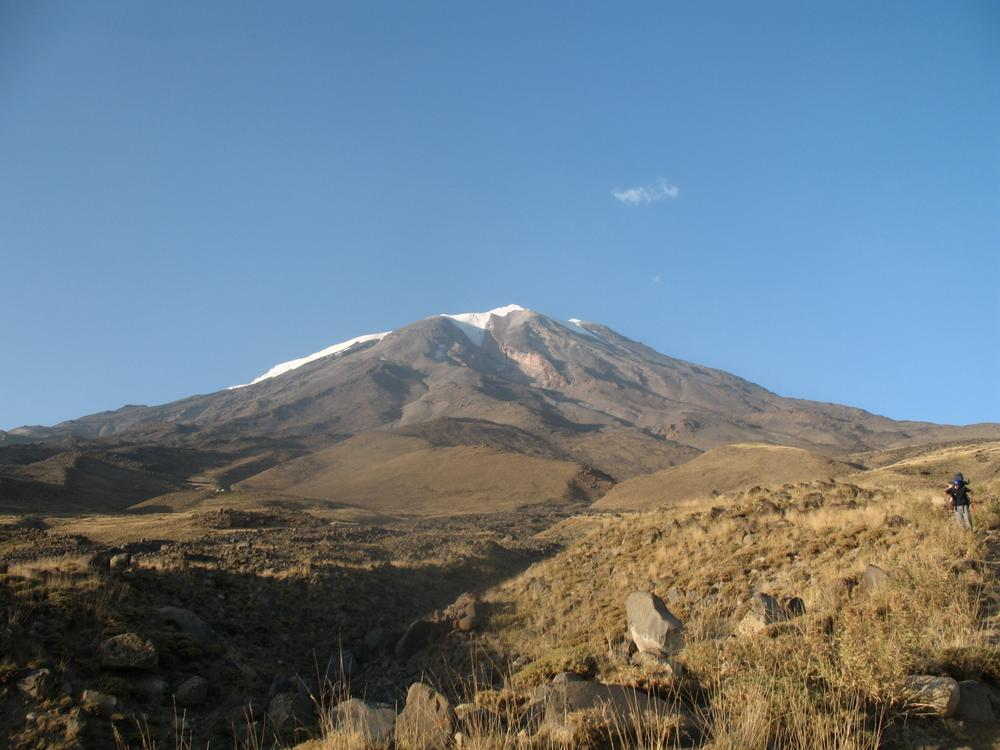
Ararat, from 2700m

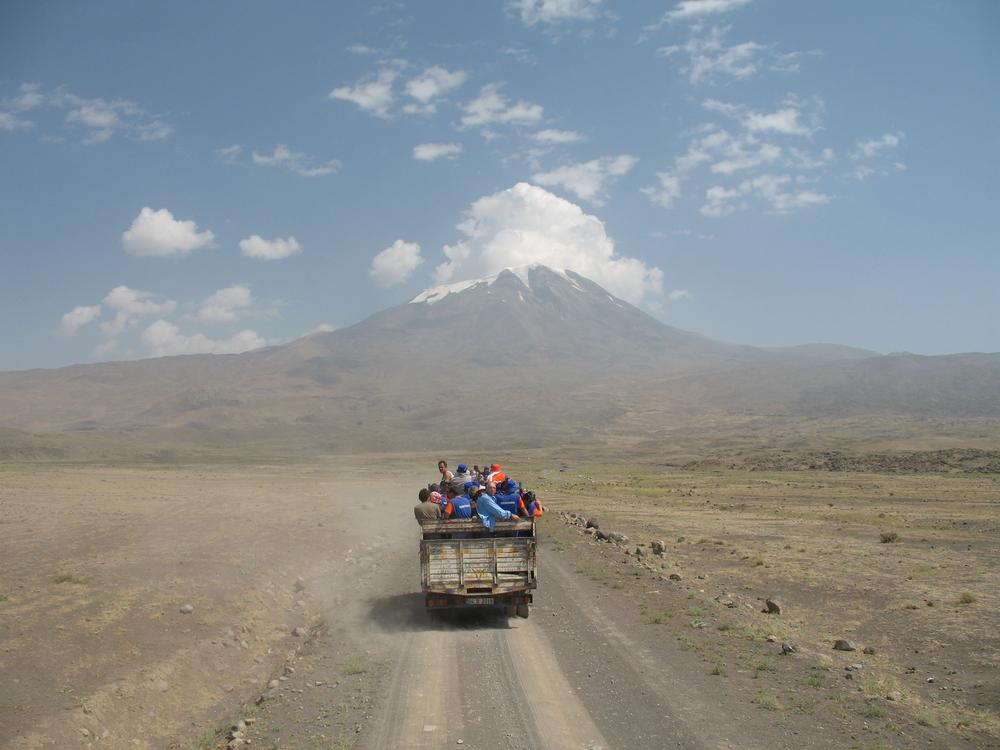
Ararat, view with truck driving mountineers

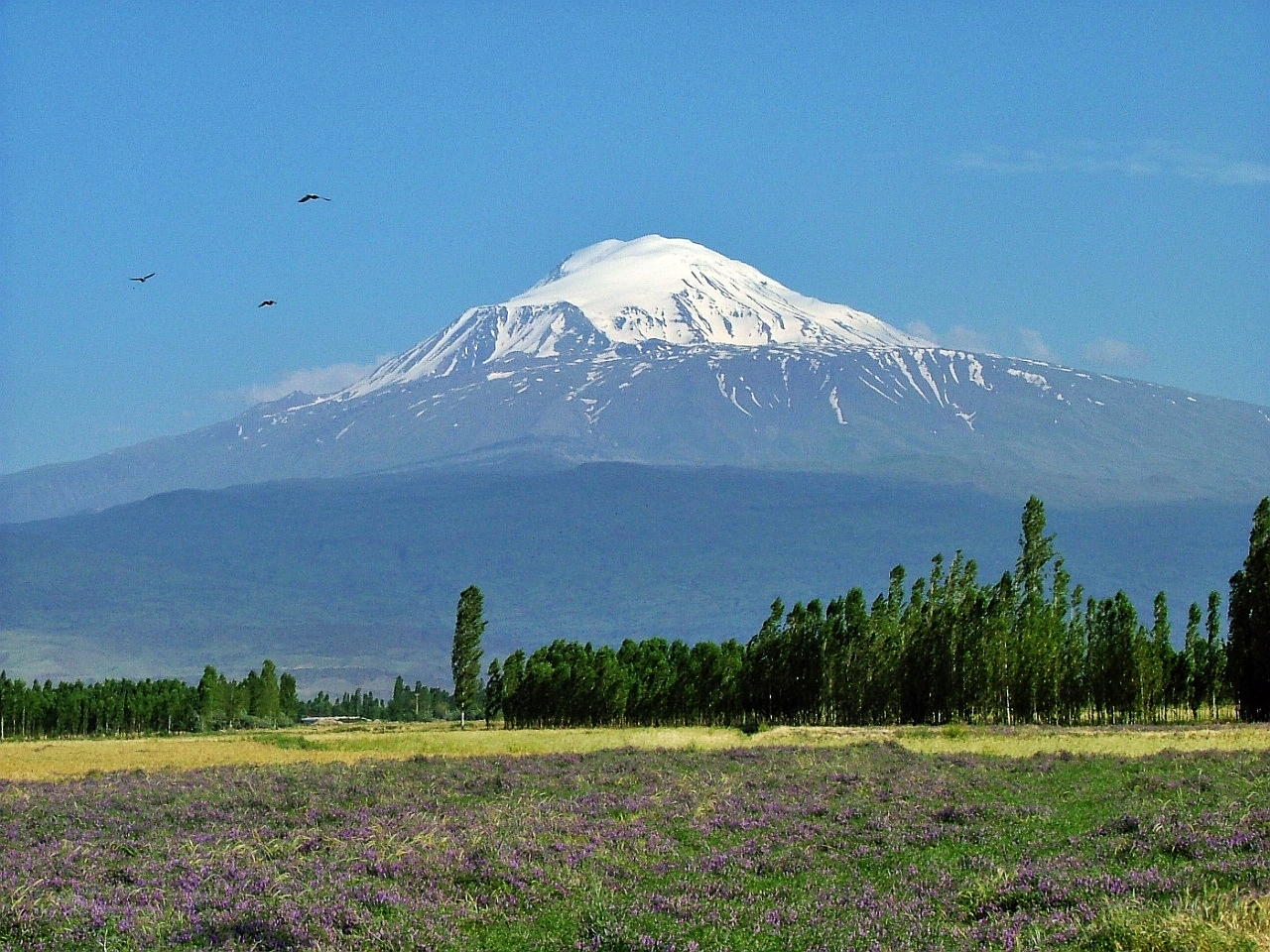
Ararat, from west

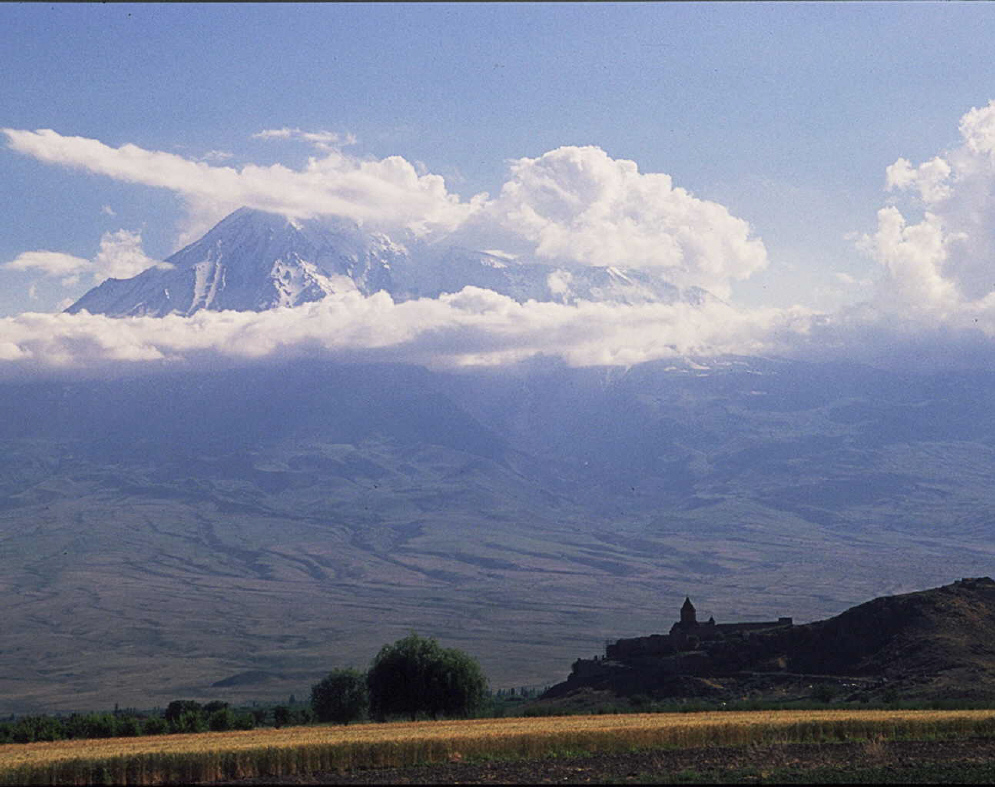
Ararat, Khorvirap monastery in front of Mount Ararat

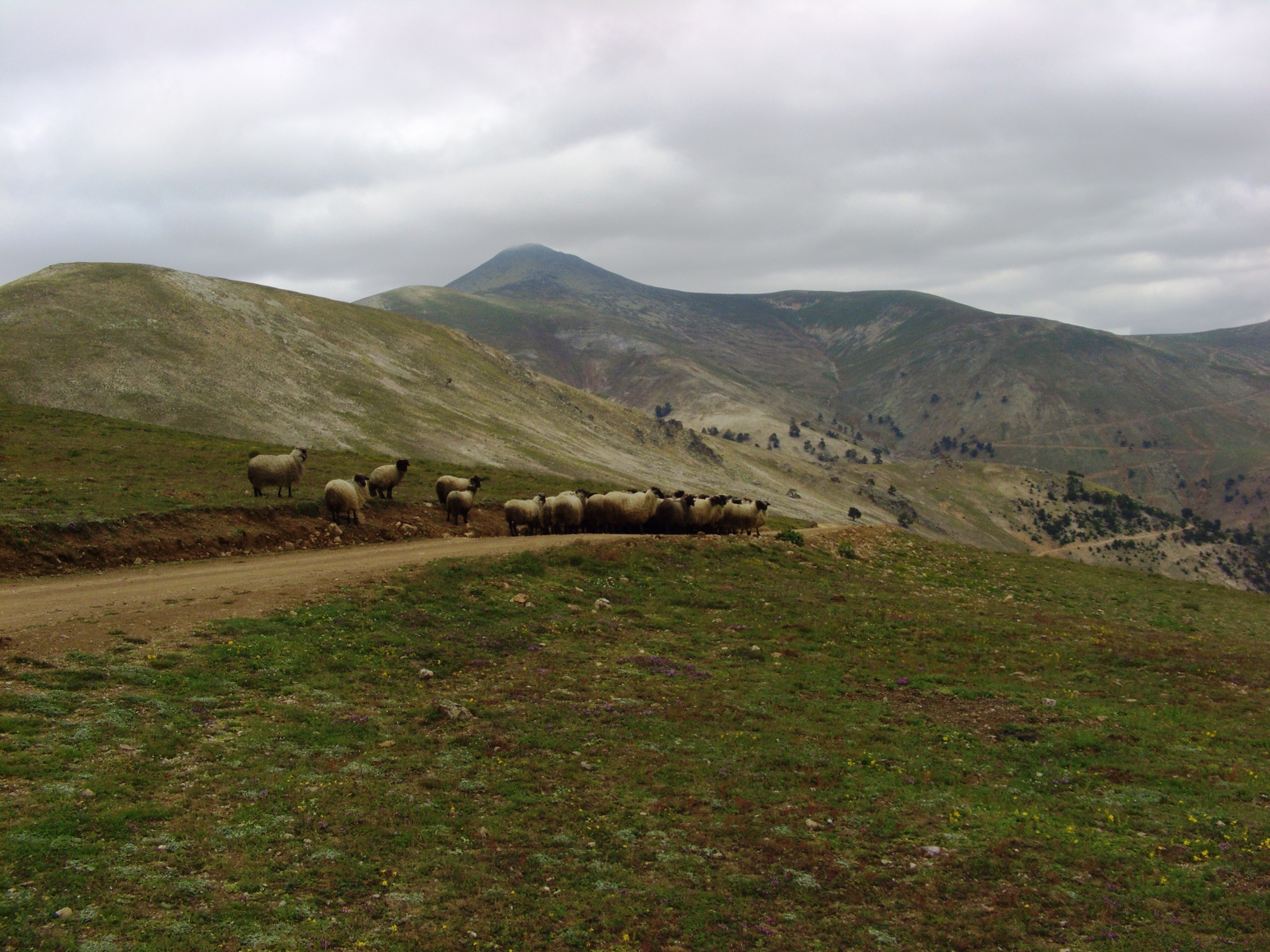
Akilbaba Tepesi in the Giresun Mountains Chain in the Black Sea Region of Turkey

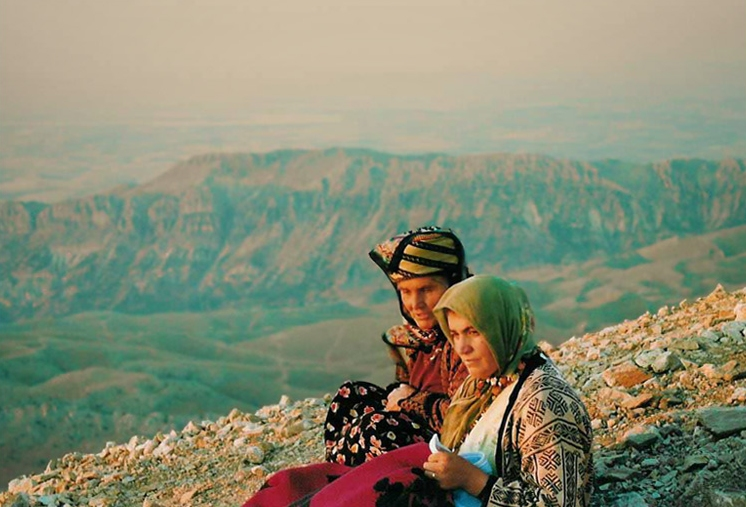
Top of the Nemrut Dağı

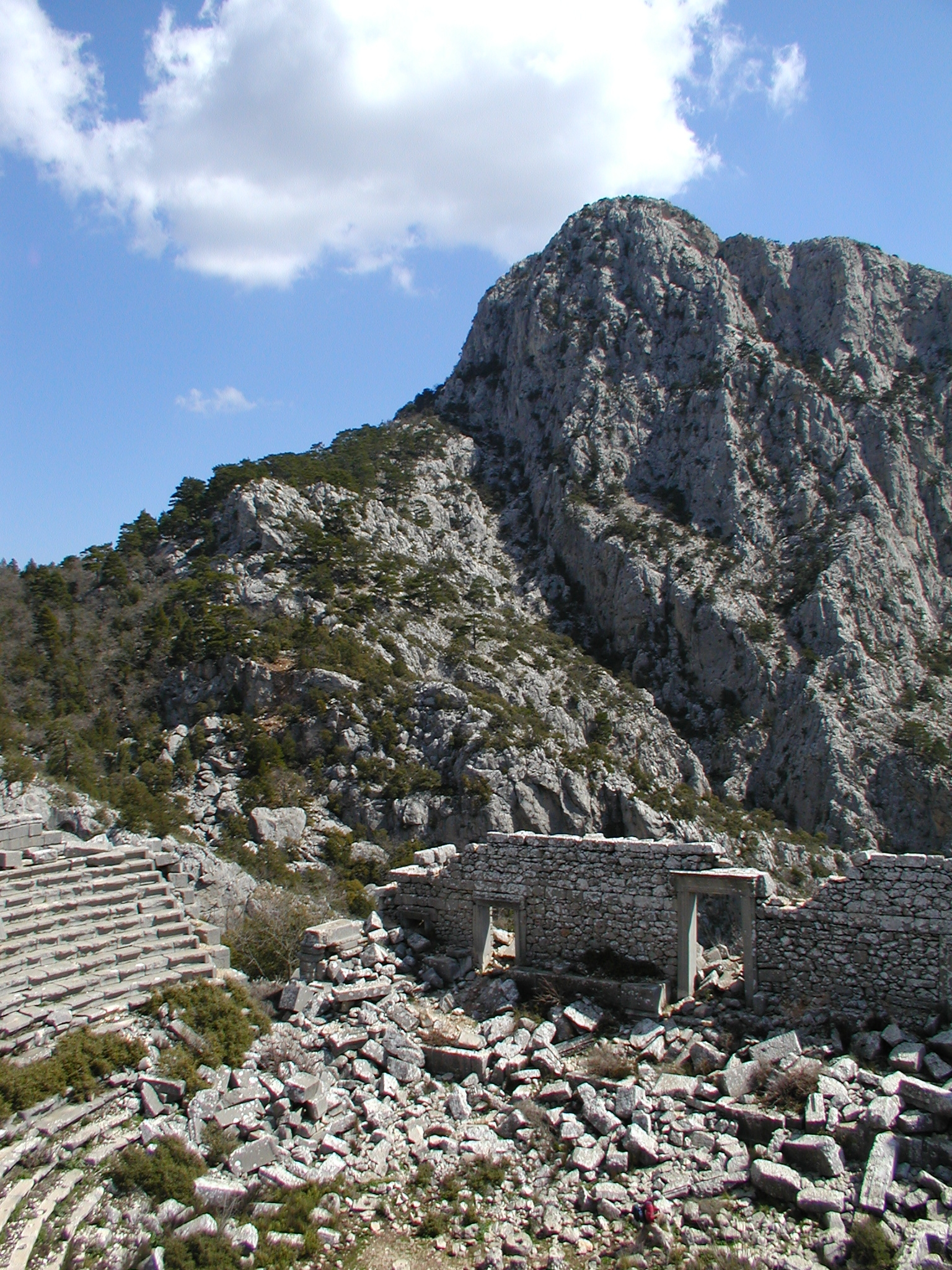
Termessos with view to mountain Solymos (Güllük Dağı)

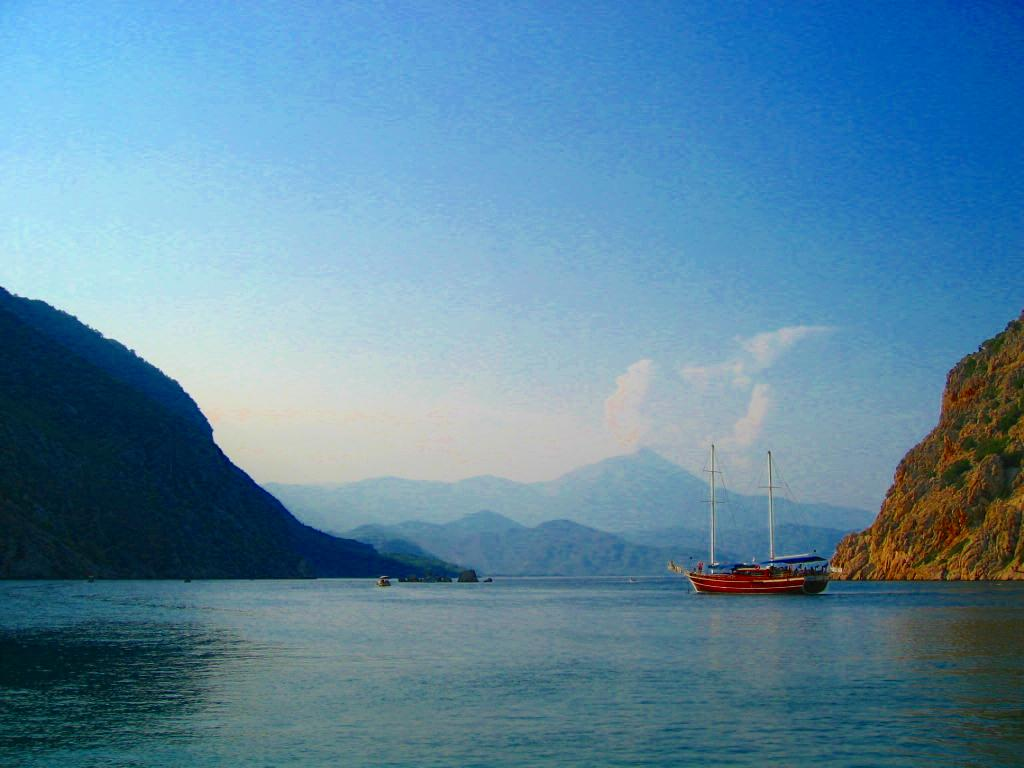
Olympos, Antalya
