= List of glaciers in Turkey =

This is a list of glaciers existing in Turkey, currently or in recent centuries. They are retreating due to climate change in Turkey.

Turkey's glaciers are mainly in the:

- Taurus Mountains,
- Eastern Black Sea Mountains,
- Dormant and extinct volcanoes.

== Taurus Mountains glaciers ==
Although there are no glaciers in the Western Taurus Mountains, there are some small glaciers in the Central Taurus. The Southeastern Taurus holds 65% of Turkey's current glaciers.

- Southeastern Taurus glaciers:
  - Uludoruk Glacier (Cilo Mountain)
  - Mia Hvara Glacier (Cilo Mountain)
  - Erinç Glacier (Suppa Durek Glacier) (Cilo Mountain)
  - Geverok Glacier (Sat Mountain)
  - Kavuşşahap Mountain Glacier
- Central Taurus glaciers:
  - Lolut Glacier (Aladağ)
  - Bolkar Mountains and Dedegöl Mountain glaciers

== Eastern Black Sea Mountains glaciers ==
Most of the glaciers in the Eastern Black Sea Mountains are in the Kaçkar Mountains, which are the highest peaks of the region.

- Kaçkar Mountains glaciers:
  - Kaçkar I, II, III glaciers
  - Krenek I, II glaciers
  - Dübe Glacier
- Verçenik Mountain glaciers:
  - Sinançor Glacier
  - Dilektepe Glacier
- Altıparmak Mountains Kırmızıgedik Glacier
- Bulut Mountains Avucur Glacier
- Soğanlı Mountain small glaciers
- Gâvur Mountain Avliyana Glacier
- Giresun Mountain small glaciers

== Glaciers on dormant and extinct volcanoes ==
Glaciers are found on Turkey's three important stratovolcanos:

- Mount Ararat summit glacier
- Süphan Mountain valley glacier
- Erciyes Mountain valley glacier

== Sources ==
- Çiner, A. (February 2003). Türkiye'nin güncel buzulları ve Geç Kuvaterner buzul çökelleri. Türkiye Jeoloji Bülteni 46(1): 55-78.
- "Seventh National Communication of Turkey under the UNFCCC" (PDF). Ministry of Environment and Urbanization. 26 December 2018.
