= Mount Cilo =

Mountain in Turkey

Coordinates: 37°30′N 43°58′E

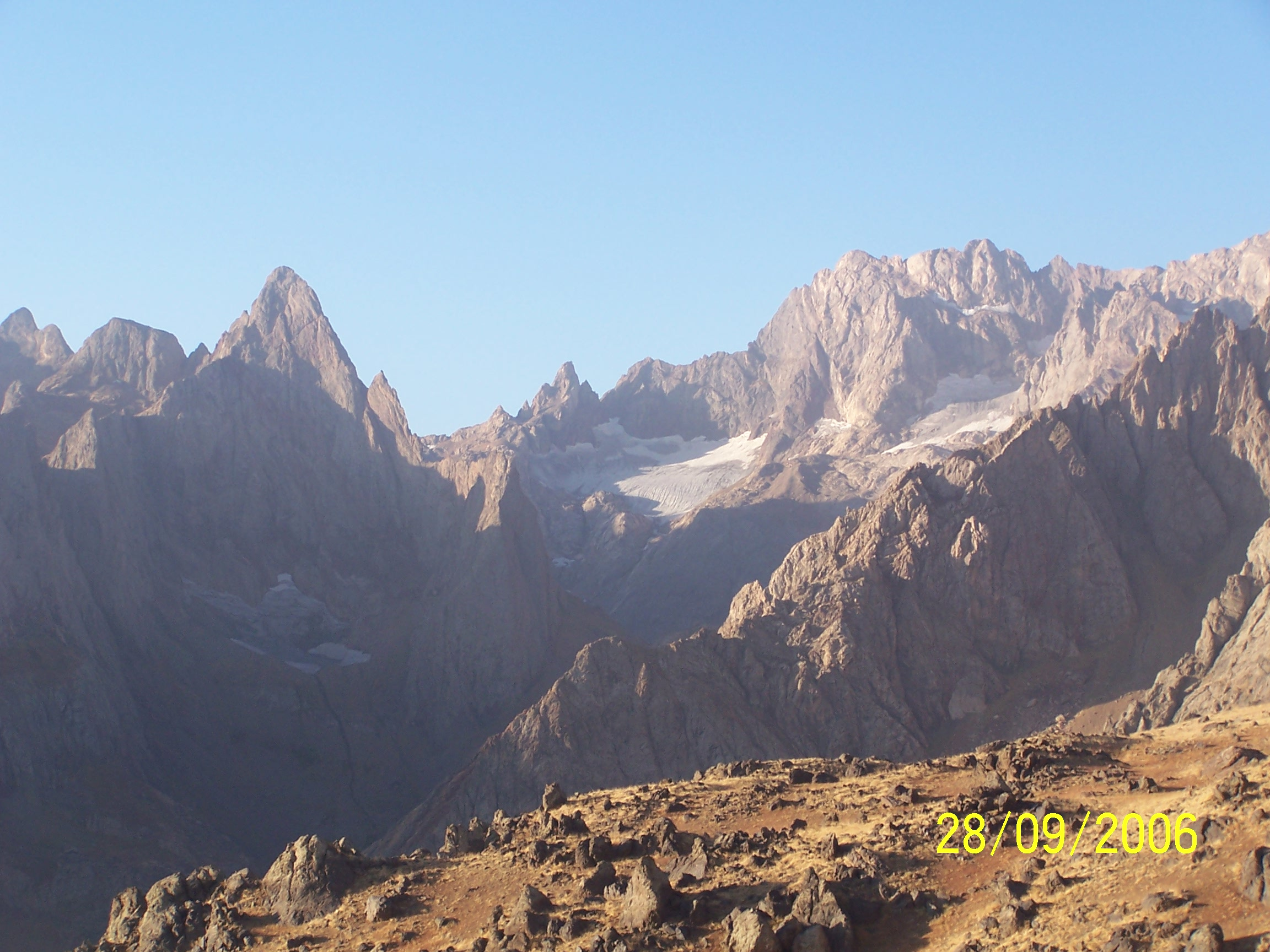
- Mount Cilo

Highest point
- Elevation: 4,135 m (13,566 ft)

Geography
- Location within Turkey Location within Middle East Location within West and Central Asia
- Location: Yüksekova, Hakkâri Province, Turkey
- Parent range: East Taurus (Doğu Toros Dağları)

Mount Cilo (Turkish: Cilo Dağı; Kurdish: Çiyayê Cîlo; Armenian: Ջողա լեռ) is the second highest mountain in Turkey after Greater Mount Ararat (Büyük Ağrı Dağı; 5,137 m (16,854 ft)). Its highest summit Reşko, also known as Gelyaşin or Uludoruk, is 4,135 m (13,566 ft) high and lies in the Hakkâri Dağları/Mountains, located in the East Taurus (Tr.: "Doğu Toroslar"), in the district of Yüksekova of the Hakkâri Province in southeasternmost part of Turkey in East Anatolia region.

== Description ==
The craggy massif Mount Cilo is 30 km (19 miles) long and forms the western part of the Hakkari Cilo-Sat Mountains National Park which was established in 2020. The mountains are characterized by an extremely rugged topography with high, pointed summits, sharp and jagged ridges, very steep or even occasionally vertical rock (primarily limestone) cliffs/walls and deep gorges and a few glaciers which are losing their volume and retreating for the last few decades due to global warming. The massif's second (and Turkey's third) highest peak Suppa Durek, a.k.a. Erinç Tepe (4,116 m (13,504 ft)), is located in the immediate vicinity (4 km (2.5 miles) to the west.

The mountain and its surroundings were declared a prohibited area due to the conflict between the PKK insurgency and Turkey for years. It was not until 2002 that a team of mountaineers was authorized to climb again the Cilo mountains.

== See also ==
- Ark of Nuh or Noah
- List of mountains in Turkey
  - Mount Judi
