= Uludoruk Glacier =

Glacier in Hakkari Province, Turkey

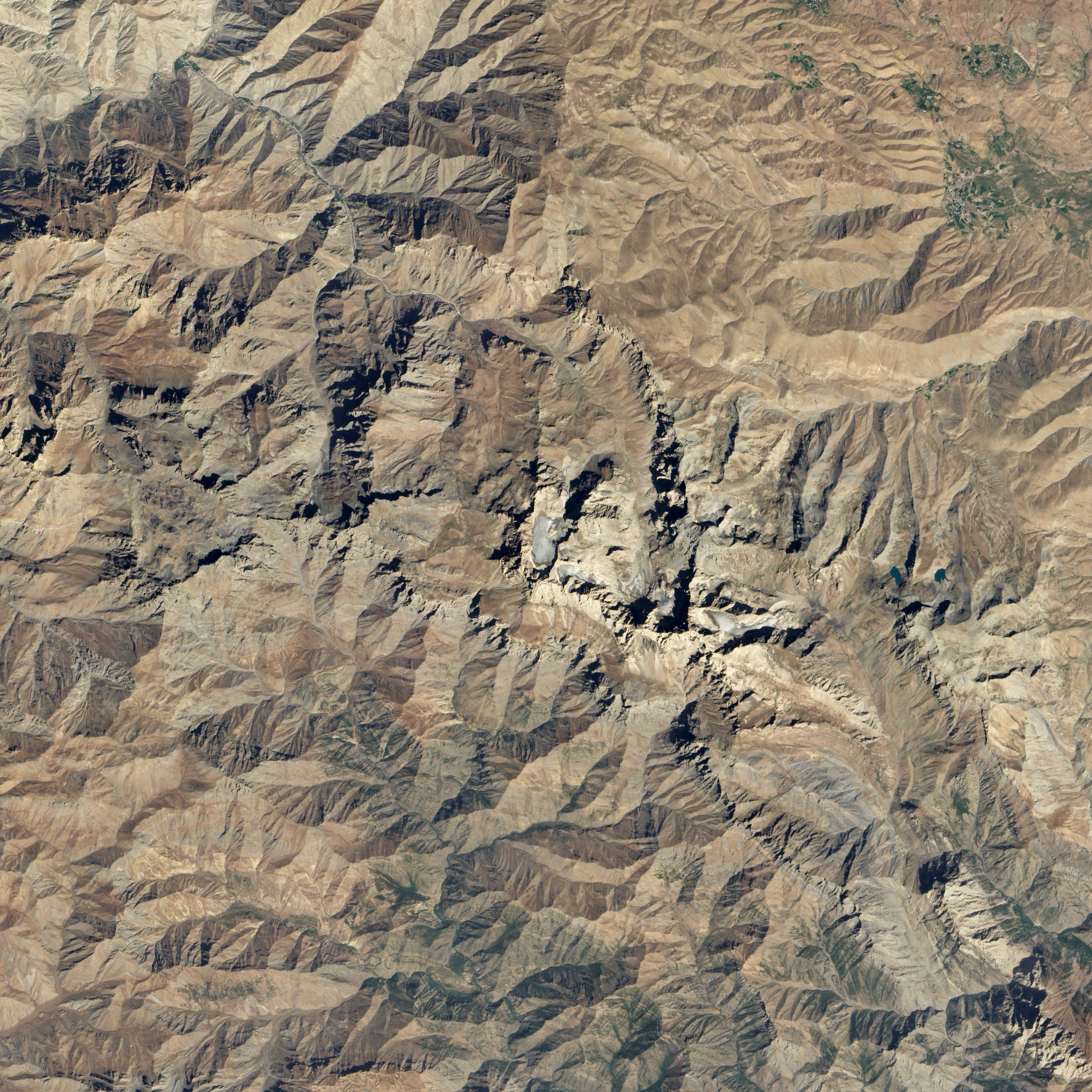
- Uludoruk Glaciers in September 2012

- Location within Turkey Location within Middle East Location within West and Central Asia
- Type: Valley glacier
- Location: Hakkâri, Turkey
- Coordinates: 37°30′02″N 44°00′45″E
- Area: 8 km^{2} (3.1 sq mi)
- Length: 4 km (2.5 mi)
- Status: Retreating

Uludoruk Glacier (Kurdish: Çiyagera Reşkoyê) is a glacier on Mount Uludoruk, one of the Zagros Mountains and the second highest mountain in Turkey. Between 1948 and 2009 the glacier retreated 12 m (39 ft) per year, due to climate change in Turkey. It is located in the far southeast of Turkey.

== See also ==
- Ark of Nuh or Noah
- List of mountains in Turkey
- Zagros Mountains
  - Cilo Dağı
  - Mount Judi
