= Kurdish creation myths =

Kurdish creation myths refer to beliefs in many mythologies regarding how the Kurds began as a nation.

== History ==
In Islam, Noah’s Ark landed on Judi Mountain. Kurdish mythology held Melik Kurdim to be a member of the tribe of Noah. When Noah’s Ark landed, Melik Kurdim established rule over Judi Mountain and built a civilization. Melik Kurdim also formed his own language, which became spoken by his descendants. Melik Kurdim lived for 600 years, and predated Christianity by 3,000 years according to Kurdish mythology. The language he created was held to be the ancestor of the Kurdish language, and the first language that was not Semitic. Evliya Çelebi wrote about Melik Kurdim after being told the story by Kurdish villagers.

Evliya Çelebi wrote that "the first town built after Noah's Flood was the town of Judi, followed by the castles of Sinjar and Silvan. The city of Judi was ruled by Melik Kurdim from the community of the Prophet Noah, who did not live less than 600 years and traveled the lengths and widths of Kurdistan. When he came to Silvan, he loved the climate and settled there, a large lineage was born from him. They spoke their own language unrelated to Hebrew. Neither Hebrew nor Arabic, Persian, Dari or Pahlavi, they still say the language of the Kurds. The Kurdish language, which was born and spoken in Silvan and is currently used in Kurdistan, owes its name to Melik Kurdim from the community of the Prophet Noah."

There were also different claims on Kurdish origins in other mythologies. Ferdowsi wrote in the Shahnameh that Kaveh the Blacksmith was the ancestor of the Kurds. In Jewish mythology, the jinns who served Solomon had settled in the Zagros Mountains and mixed with its inhabitants, who became the ancestors of the Kurds.
