= Şaphane mountain =

Mountain in Turkey

Şaphane is one of Western Anatolia's highest mountains; at Ulugedik peak, it is 2,120 metres in height. (Another of the highest is Murat mountain, 2,309 metres high at Kartaltepe peak.)

Şaphane is located in the southwest of Kütahya Province, Turkey. The Gediz river originates at the mountain and empties into the Aegean east of the Çilazmak Dalyanı (fishing weir).

Şaphane was shaped in the last periods of 3. Geological era, and has sedimentary, lime and ferrous-oxide material.

There are pine (at 1,500-2,000 m),oak and juniper (at 1,000-1,500 m) forests on the mountain. Fagus orientalis forests are also found in a small cluster on the northern slopes of Şaphane. Şaphane also is shelter some endemic species, like as;

- Rhododendron ponticium L.
- Aethionema R.Br
- Allium reuterianum Boiss
- Allium reuterianum Schulte

Şaphane has deer conservation and licensed hunting zones.

== See also ==
- Government web
- Municipality web
