= Tahtalı Mountain Range =

Mountain range in Turkey

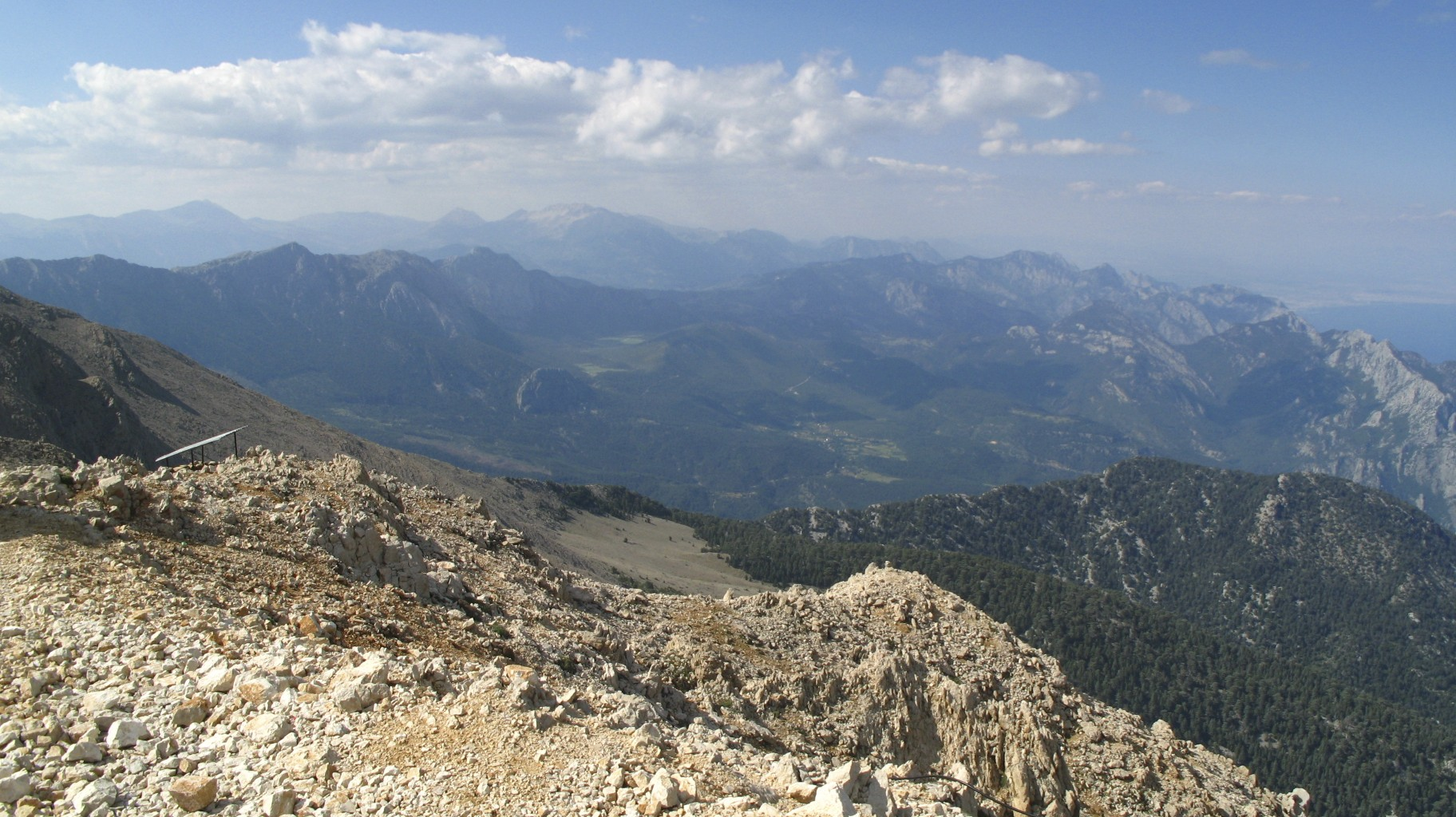
- Tahtali Mountains

Highest point
- Peak: Bey Dağı
- Elevation: 3,075 m (10,089 ft)

Geography
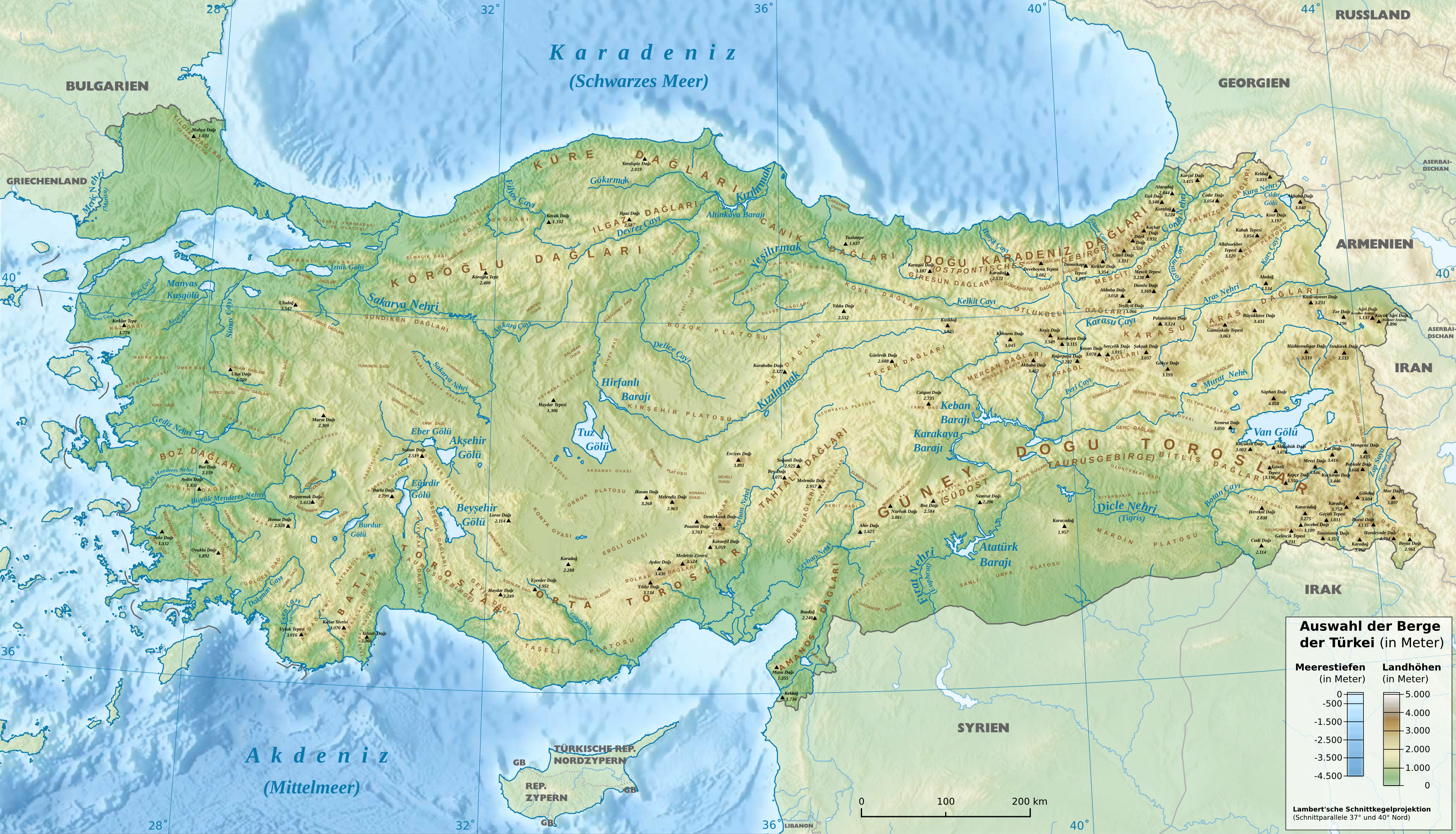
- Map of Turkish Mountain Ranges
- Country: Turkey
- Provinces: Kayseri, Adana, Sivas and Kahramanmaraş
- Range coordinates: 38°50′0″N 36°27′0″E
- Parent range: Taurus Mountains

The Tahtalı Mountain Range (Turkish: Tahtalı Dağları) are located in the Central Anatolian area of Turkey. It lies in the middle of the Taurus Mountains, mostly between the provinces of Kayseri, Adana, with smaller areas within the provinces of Sivas and Kahramanmaraş.

The mountain range is location to the southeast of Kayseri province, south of Siva, north of Adana and northwest of Kahramanmaraş. The Tahtalı mountain range is between the two branches of the river Seyhan, as well as between Zamantı and Göksu. The sources of both branches are also the northern tip of Tahtalı which meet the river Seyhan at the southern tip.

The Tahtalı Mountain range is about 170 km long and 50 km wide. Many mountains in this range have elevations of over 2500 m. The tallest mountain is (Bey Dağı) near Tufanbeyli (Adana Province) with an elevation 3,075 metres (10,089 ft). The rivers Ceyhan and Seyhan flow parallel to each other and have their sources in this area and their mouths are located near Çukurova, leading into the Mediterranean Sea.
