= 435 Convent Avenue =

Residential building in Manhattan, New York City

Coordinates: 40°49′37″N 73°56′39″W

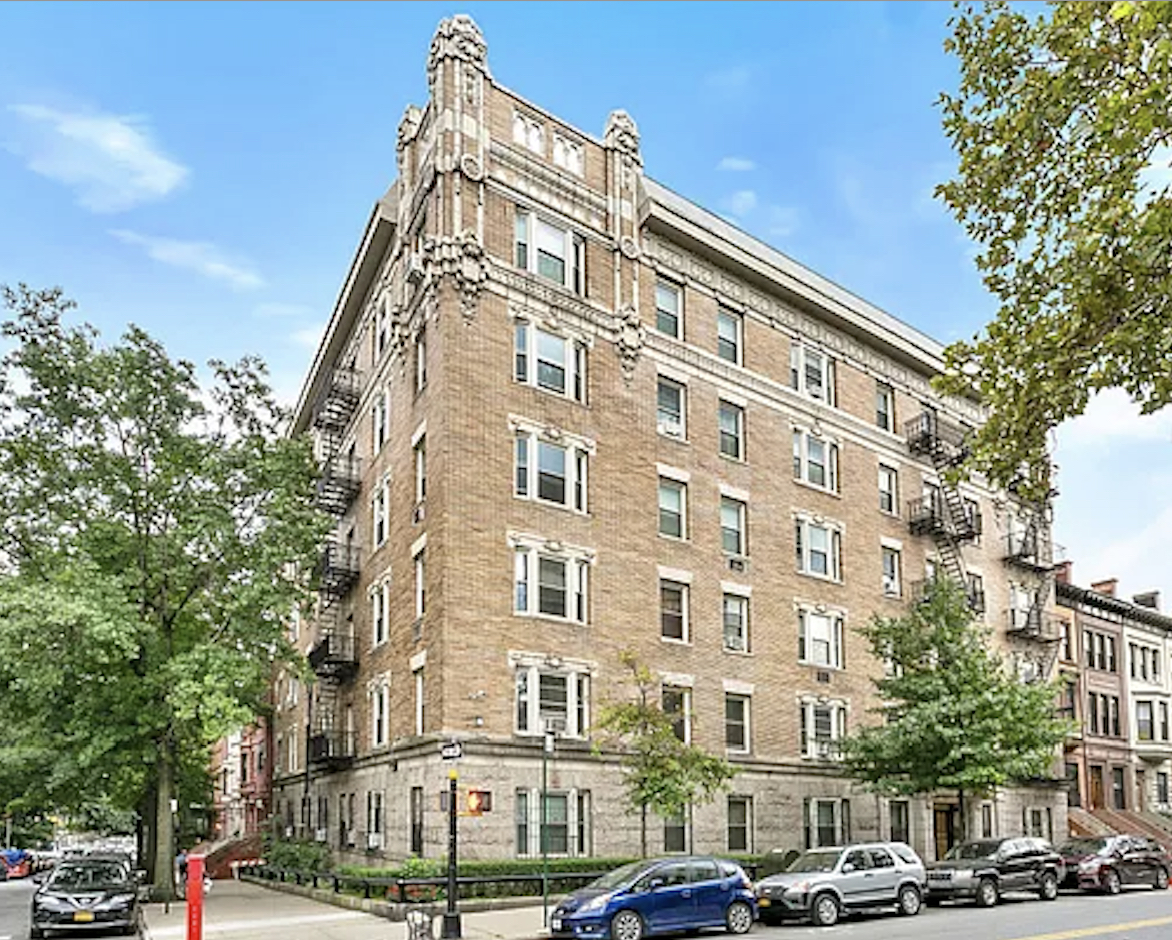
The Garrison Apartments, Inc., 435 Convent Avenue

435 Convent Avenue is a six-story granite, brick, and terra cotta cooperative apartment building called The Garrison Apartments, Inc. It stands at the southeast corner of Convent Avenue and West 149th Street on Sugar Hill in the Hamilton Heights neighborhood in West Harlem in Manhattan in New York City. The building has 29 apartments individually owned by the shareholders in the corporation, a superintendent's apartment in the basement, and a common-area garden in the back.

== Architecture ==
Designed and built by architects Neville & Bagge for owner E. M. Krulewitch in 1909–1910, the apartment building at 435 Convent Avenue was originally named Emsworth Hall. Its architectural style has been called Beaux-Arts Classical and French Renaissance Revival.

Neville & Bagge was a Harlem-based architectural and construction firm with offices at 217 West 125th Street. They were active in New York City between 1892 and 1917 and became one of the most prolific designers of multiple dwellings in Manhattan, especially in the uptown neighborhoods of Harlem, Morningside Heights, and the Upper West Side where residential construction was booming. In Morningside Heights: A History of Its Architecture and Development, Andrew S. Dolkart writes:

Although generally unheralded, it was Schwartz & Gross, George Pelham, Neville & Bagge, and other speculative architects who, by the sheer volume of their work, created the architectural character and texture of many of New York's neighborhoods . . .

Neville & Bagge applied for at least 531 new building permits between 1892 and 1917 and designed and built many uptown Manhattan landmark buildings—most residential but a few religious, too—such as:

- The Cornwall, a 12-story Beaux-Arts building at 255 West 90th Street, noted for its elaborate balcony and window detail and ornate cornice in the Art Nouveau style.
- The Roman Catholic Church of St. Paul at 113 East 117th Street in East Harlem, completed in 1908 in the Romanesque Revival style and designated a New York City Landmark in 2016.
- St. Cecilia's Convent, also known as the Regina Angelorum, at 112–118 East 106th Street in East Harlem, completed in 1907 and designated a New York City Landmark in 1976. Neville & Bagge's design united two existing buildings behind a new façade to house both a convent for the Sisters of Mercy and a home for working girls.

== Landmark status ==
435 Convent Avenue is in the Hamilton Heights/Sugar Hill Historic District, which was designated a landmark by the New York City Landmarks Preservation Commission in 2000; the Designation Report discusses 435 Convent Avenue on pages 43 through 45. The Sugar Hill Historic District was also registered on the National Register of Historic Places in 2002; the Registration Form discusses 435 Convent Avenue on page 33.

== History ==
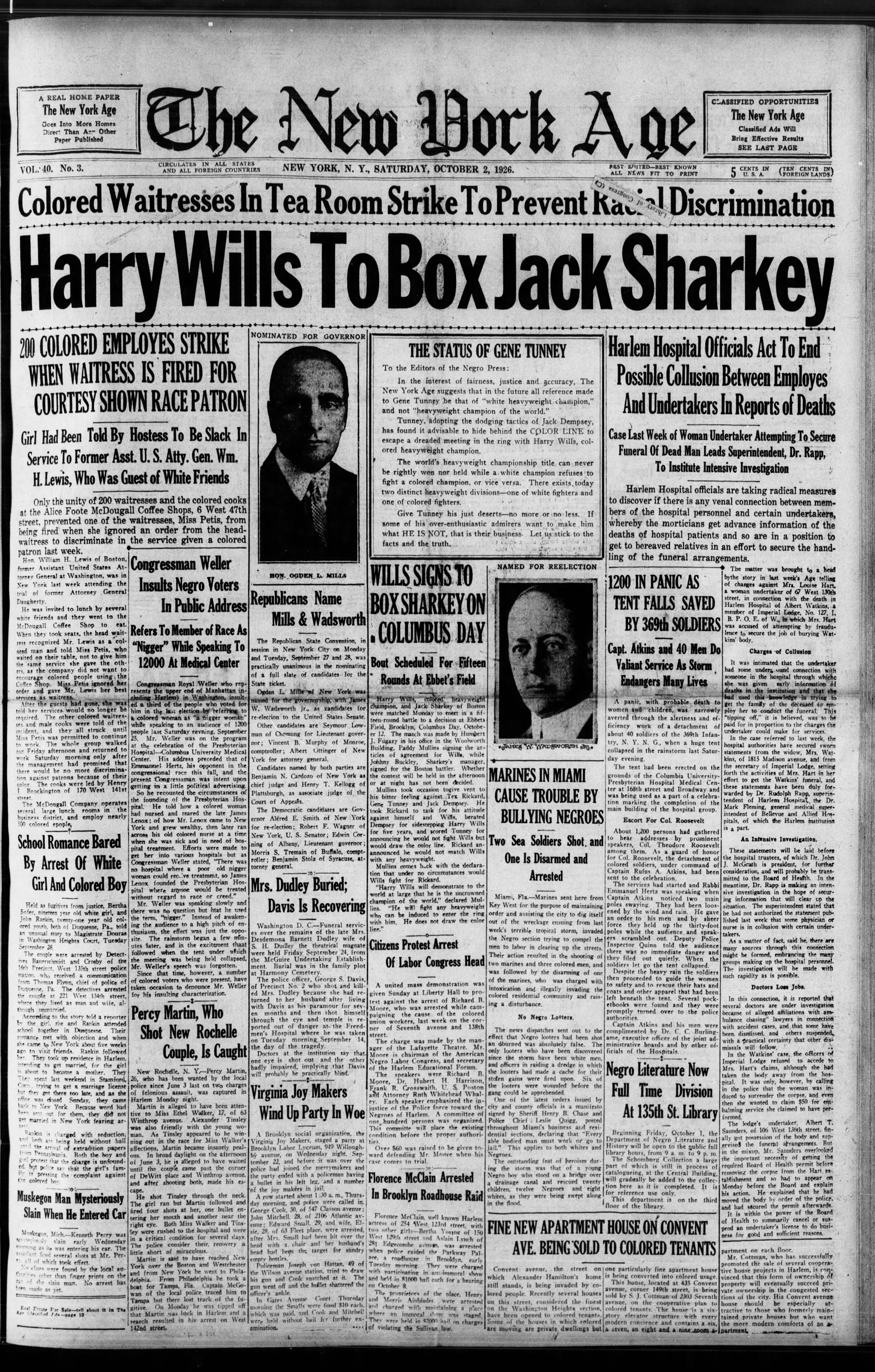
The New York Age, October 2, 1926.

Black real estate developer Samuel J. Cottman began advertising the sale of apartments at 435 Convent Avenue "on the Co-operative Plan" to Black buyers as early as September 1926. It was a story that ran on the cover of the Black newspaper The New York Age on October 2, 1926:

FINE NEW APARTMENT HOUSE ON CONVENT AVE. BEING SOLD TO COLORED TENANTS

Convent avenue, the street on which Alexander Hamilton's home still stands, is being invaded by colored people. Recently several houses on this street, considered the finest on the Washington Heights section, have been opened to colored tenants. Some of the houses in which colored are moving are private dwellings but one particularly fine apartment house is being converted into colored usage.

This house, located at 435 Convent avenue, corner 149th street, is being sold by S. J. Cottman of 2303 Seventh avenue, on the cooperative plan to colored tenants. The house is a six-story elevator structure with every modern convience [sic] and contains a six, a seven, an eight and a nine-room apartment on each floor.

Mr. Cottman, who has successfully promoted the sale of several cooperative house projects in Harlem, is convinced that this form of ownership of property will eventually succeed private ownership in the congested sections of the city. His Convent avenue house should be especially attractive to those who formerly maintained private houses but who want the more modern comforts of an apartment.

Between 1926 and 1929, Mr. Cottman regularly advertised apartments at 435 Convent Avenue for sale on the cooperative plan in the Black newspaper New York Amsterdam News.

By the summer of 1929, a significant number of shareholder-residents were in place at 435 Convent Avenue, and they took steps to form a corporation and purchase the building. On September 24, 1929, they filed the Certificate of Incorporation with the New York State Department of State under their new corporate name: The Garrison Apartments, Inc. The 9 directors of the corporation were Jules Bledsoe, Charles A. Butler, Peter B. Codrington, Helen M. Cottman, Edward David, Lily B. Dyett, Thomas C. Hall, Clyde Jammott, and Henry McNichols. According to Peter Codrington's descendants who are shareholders in The Garrison today, the name "Garrison" was chosen to honor William Lloyd Garrison (1805–1879), the American abolitionist and journalist best known for his widely read anti-slavery newspaper The Liberator.

Seven weeks later, on November 13, 1929, the deed to 435 Convent Avenue passed to The Garrison Apartments, Inc. The seller was the Shastocon Realty Corporation, which presumably was Mr. Cottman's holding company.

The Garrison was the first co-op on Sugar Hill, and it was Black owned. It was not, however, the first Black owned co-op apartment building in Harlem as a whole. The Strathmore at 1890 Seventh Avenue in Central Harlem had become a co-op earlier in the 1920s but failed by 1933. And the Dunbar Apartments, which are named for the Black poet, novelist, and short story writer Paul Laurence Dunbar (1872–1906) and are located east of Sugar Hill at West 149th and 150th Streets between Seventh Avenue and Eighth Avenue, had opened as the first large co-op for African-Americans in 1928 but, by the end of 1936, its cooperative plan was abandoned. It may be said that The Garrison is today the oldest continuously operated Black founded, owned, and managed co-op in New York City.

At the end of 1929 a Board of Directors was elected for The Garrison Apartments with Peter B. Codrington as its first President. The Board immediately assumed all of Mr. Cottman's previous duties in the management of the building, which included selling apartments, collecting rents, paying bills, and making repairs. While Mr. Cottman had not kept regular books, the Board committed itself to record-keeping and group management by electing not only a President and Vice-President, but also a Secretary, a Treasurer, a Chair of the House Committee, and a Chair of the Finance Committee. Mr. Cottman remained a friend of the Board and lived in apartment 62 at The Garrison until his death in 1941.

Peter B. Codrington served as President of the Board from 1929 to 1945 and again until 1973. In the 1930s, when more than 3 out of 4 cooperative apartment buildings in New York and Chicago went bankrupt, Mr. Codrington successfully led the young corporation through the Great Depression. In his 9-page "History of The Garrison Apartments" (1979), he wrote:

The economic situation of the day made the problems of meeting our obligations extremely difficult. It must be remembered that many of our apartments remained unsold. Some of these were rented, but some remained vacant. Some of our stockholders had lost their jobs and others suffered severe cuts in pay. . . . The board of directors tackled these and all the myriad other problems with energy and determination.

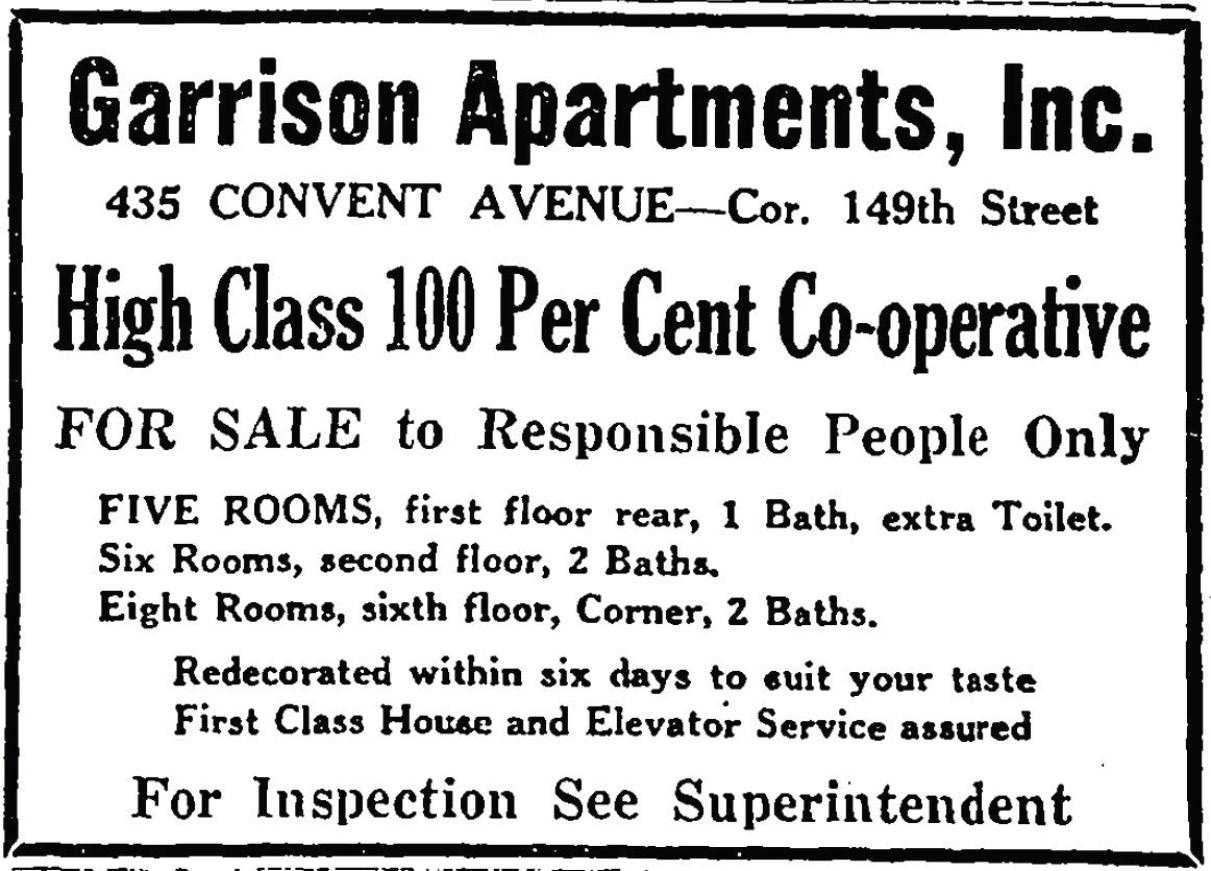
New York Amsterdam News, October 15, 1930; p 23.

Starting in 1930, for the remaining unsold apartments at The Garrison, the Board of Directors ran display ads in the New York Amsterdam News that featured the co-op's new name. By 1936, Mr. Codrington and his fellow Board members had placed owners in 26 of the 29 apartments. The remaining 3 were purchased by families in the late 1930s and the 1940s.

== Residents ==
Adam Clayton Powell Sr., civil rights leader, a founder of the National Urban League, and the longtime pastor of Harlem's Abyssinian Baptist Church, which he built into the largest Protestant congregation in the country with more than 10,000 members. He lived in apartment 3.

Adam Clayton Powell Jr., civil rights leader, pastor of Abyssinian Baptist Church, the first Black Councilman in New York City, and the first Black US Representative from any state in the Northeast. In 1934 he supported the successful "Don't Buy Where You Can't Work" boycott of Blumstein's department store organized by civil rights activists Effa Manly and the Rev. John Howard Johnson of the Citizens' League for Fair Play. Powell later organized and chaired the Greater New York Coordinating Committee for Employment which, in 1938, won agreement from Woolworth's, S. H. Kress & Co, A. S. Beck Shoe Corporation, and other major businesses not to discriminate against Blacks in hiring for professional roles. He lived in apartment 3.

Louise Thompson Patterson, teacher, civil rights and labor activist, and a central figure in the Harlem Renaissance. She was the stenographer for Langston Hughes and Zora Neale Hurston when they collaboratively wrote the controversial folk-comedy play Mule Bone. Some of the co-writing took place in her apartment which, biographers say, was like "a second home" to Hughes and Hurston in the Spring of 1930. An ill-fated project, Mule Bone led to one of the most infamous quarrels in American literature—and the end of Hughes and Hurston's friendship—with Thompson Patterson at its center. She lived in apartment 22.

Jules Bledsoe, baritone opera singer, stage and film actor, composer, and pioneer in American music. A leading figure in the Harlem Renaissance, he earned enduring success on Broadway and international renown in opera. He crossed the color line to perform with major opera companies such as the Royal Concertgebouw Orchestra of Amsterdam, the BBC Symphony in London, the Royal-Dutch Italian Opera Company, the Cleveland Stadium Opera, the Chicago Opera Company, and the Cosmopolitan Opera Association at the New York Hippodrome. A gay man, Mr. Bledsoe was one of the original shareholders and a member of the first Board of Directors at The Garrison Apartments in 1929.

Countee Cullen, acclaimed poet of the Harlem Renaissance and one-time son-in-law of W. E. B. Du Bois. He lived in apartment 43.

Elise Johnson McDougald, also known as Gertrude Elise Ayer, pioneering educator who in 1935 became the first Black woman principal in the New York City public school system following the 1898 consolidation. James Baldwin, who was her pupil in the 5th and 6th grades at Harlem's P.S. 24, later said, "She proved to me that I didn't have to be entirely defined by my circumstances. . . . [Mrs. Ayer] was a living proof that I was not necessarily what the country said I was." She lived in apartment 33.

Thomas Ben Dyett, "The Dean of Black Lawyers," an assistant district attorney in Manhattan from 1927 to 1937, a member of the New York Constitutional Convention of 1938, a member of the New York State Commission of Correction from 1940 to 1946, a founding officer of Carver Federal Savings & Loan (the oldest and largest Black operated bank in the US) in 1948, the first Black member of the New York City Civil Service Commission, a member of the Board of the NAACP Legal Defense and Education Fund, the first Black member of the Committee on Character and Fitness of the New York State Bar, and a founding partner of Dyett, Alexander & Dinkins, the leading Black law firm in New York City whose other partners, Fritz Alexander and David Dinkins, became the first Black judge on the New York Court of Appeals (the highest court in the State of New York) and the first Black mayor of New York City, respectively. He lived in apartment 63.

Henry Kempton Craft, a 1907 Harvard graduate, an electrical engineer, a teacher at the Tuskegee Institute, the executive director of the Harlem YMCA from 1932 to 1946, and the field coordinator for the New York State Commission Against Discrimination, now known as the New York State Division of Human Rights. In 1941, along with A. Philip Randolf, Walter White, Lester Granger, Frank Crosswaith, Layle Lane, and Rayford Logan, Mr. Craft was an organizing member of Negroes’ Committee to March on Washington for Equal Participation in National Defense, which planned to mobilize 50,000 to 100,000 marchers on July 1, 1941 to protest the Jim Crow defense program after previous efforts to persuade President Franklin Roosevelt to desegregate the military were unsuccessful. A week before the march, Roosevelt signed Executive Order 8802, which prohibited ethnic or racial discrimination in the nation's defense industry (including in companies, unions, and federal agencies engaged in war-related work) and created the Fair Employment Practice Committee. Though not a law, Executive Order 8802 was the first federal action to promote equal opportunity and prohibit employment discrimination in the United States, and it represented the first executive civil rights directive since Reconstruction. As a result of this victory, the 1941 March on Washington was called off by its organizing committee. Mr. Craft was the grandson of William and Ellen Craft, abolitionists famous for their daring escape from slavery in 1848 and their 1860 book, Running a Thousand Miles for Freedom; Or, the Escape of William and Ellen Craft from Slavery. He lived in apartment 35.

Cornelius W. McDougald, Jr., lawyer, a commissioner on the New York City Commission on Human Rights, a longtime leader on NAACP national committees for Life Membership and the Freedom Fund Dinner, a trustee of the New York Bank for Savings, and chair of the Board of Trustees of the Community Church of New York in the 1960s when CCNY was the most successfully integrated congregation in the Unitarian Universalist Association. He lived in apartment 52.
