= List of Northfield Mount Hermon people =

Since its founding in 1879, Northfield Mount Hermon School has graduated students who went on to excel in technology; education; consulting and professional services; finance; government, law, and politics; arts, entertainment, and media; healthcare and social services; and nonprofits.

- Thomas Nelson Baker Sr., 1889, first African-American to receive a PhD in philosophy in the United States
- Elizabeth Barrows Ussher, 1891, Christian missionary
- Lee de Forest, 1893, radio pioneer
- William G. Morgan, 1893, inventor of volleyball
- Howard Thurston, 1893, magician
- Ernest Yarrow, 1897, director of the Near East Foundation
- Belle da Costa Greene, librarian
- Peter Moss, 1976, basketball player
- Juliana R. Force, 1900, art museum director
- Pixley Seme, 1902, founder of the African National Congress
- Henry Kempton Craft, 1902, civil rights leader and YMCA executive
- Chester Barnard, 1906, philanthropist
- Henry Roe Cloud, 1906, educator and government official
- Mohini Maya Das, 1906, educator
- Harry Kemp, tramp poet, c. 1907 (expelled)
- DeWitt Wallace, 1907, founder of Reader's Digest
- Walter Harper, c. 1916, mountain climber
- Monroe W. Smith, 1919, founder of American Youth Hostels
- Susie Walking Bear Yellowtail, early 1920s (d.n.g), nurse and activist
- S. Prestley Blake, 1934, founder of Friendly's Ice Cream
- Lawrence Ferlinghetti, 1937, poet
- Tad Mosel, 1940, playwright
- James W. McLamore, 1943, founder of Burger King
- John E. Kingston, 1944, New York Supreme Court judge
- Mary C. Potter, 1947–1948, professor of psychology
- James Nabrit III, 1948, civil rights attorney
- Richard Gilder, 1950, philanthropist
- William C. Pryor, 1950, chief judge
- Anna Diggs Taylor, 1950, chief judge
- David Hartman, 1952, television host
- William R. Rhodes, 1953, corporate executive
- June Jordan, 1953, poet, professor of African American Studies
- J. Stapleton Roy, 1953, diplomat
- Edward W. Said, 1953, literary theorist
- Neil Sheehan, 1954, author
- Jane English, 1960, academic, photographer
- William Scott Green, 1964, academic, university administrator
- Frank Shorter, 1965, marathoner
- Lynne Anderson, 1965, professor of education
- William Ackerman, 1967, founder of Windham Hill Records and 2005 Grammy Award winner
- Natalie Cole, 1968, vocalist
- Amy Domini, 1968, social investor
- Viola Baskerville, 1969, Virginia secretary of administration
- Willie Wolfe, 1969, founding member of the Symbionese Liberation Army
- Brian F. Atwater, 1969, geologist
- Dore Gold, 1971, former permanent representative of Israel to the United Nations
- Erik Lindgren, 1972, composer
- Tim Stryker, 1972, computer programmer
- Jim Keller, 1972, musician Tommy Tutone
- Valerie Jarrett, 1974, senior advisor to Barack Obama
- John S. Chen, 1974, CEO of BlackBerry
- Helen DeWitt, 1975, novelist
- Timothy Horrigan, 1975, member of the New Hampshire House of Representatives
- Thom Gimbel, 1977, rhythm guitar, saxophone, flute, keyboards, vocals Foreigner
- Taggart Siegel, 1977, documentary filmmaker, Queen of the Sun
- Elizabeth Perkins, 1978, actress
- Rick Boyages, 1981, associate commissioner for Big Ten Conference Men's Basketball
- Michael M. Gilday, 1981, chief of Naval Operations, U. S. Navy
- Laura Linney, 1982, actress
- Buster Olney, 1982, sports writer
- Dylan Brody, 1982, humorist, author, comedian, playwright, and poet
- Kim Raver, 1985, actor
- Bryan Callen, 1985, actor, comedian
- Whitney Tilson, 1985, hedge fund manager, philanthropist, author, and Democratic political activist
- Arn Chorn-Pond, 1986, activist and musician
- Hasok Chang, 1985, historian and philosopher of science
- Uma Thurman, 1988 (d.n.g.), actor, model
- Samantha Hunt, 1989, writer
- John Edgar Park, 1990, author
- Warren Webster, 1991, president and co-founder of Patch Media
- Misha Collins, 1992, actor
- John D'Agata, 1992, author
- Aaron Schuman, 1995, photographer, writer, curator and educator
- Brian Pothier, 1996, ice hockey player
- Yasmin Vossoughian, 1996, news anchor
- David de Burgh Graham, 1999, Liberal Party MP in House of Commons of Canada
- Anna Schuleit, visual artist
- YaYa DaCosta, 2000, actress
- Kimmie Weeks, 2001, human rights activist
- Dallas Baker, 2002, football player
- Nick Jandl, 2003, actor
- Tony Gaffney, 2004, basketball player
- Brian Strait, 2006, ice hockey player
- Oliver Drake, 2006, baseball player
- Clive Weeden, 2007, basketball player
- Tessa Gobbo, 2009, rower
- Spike Albrecht, 2012, basketball player
- Kellan Grady, 2017, basketball player
- Kai Toews, 2018, basketball player
- Danny Wolf, 2022, American-Israeli NBA player for the Brooklyn Nets
