= Onondaga County Justice Center =

Maximum-security prison in Syracuse, New York

Coordinates: 43°02′46″N 76°08′49″W

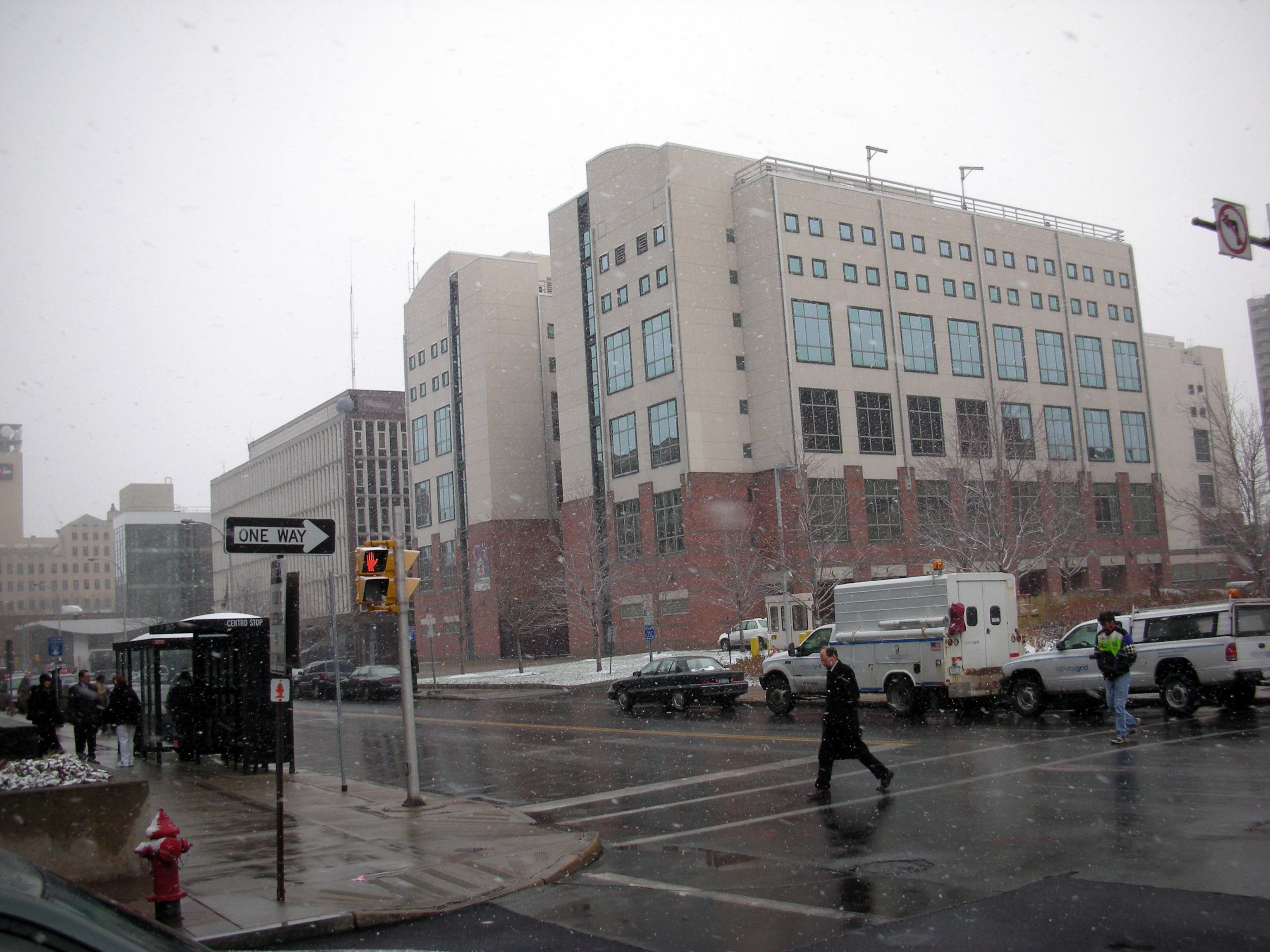
Onondaga County Justice Center

The Patrick J. Corbett Justice Center, otherwise known as the Onondaga County Justice Center is a maximum-security facility located in Syracuse, New York. Designed with state of the art technology, the Justice Center has been operating as a direct supervision jail since 1995. housing a variety of incarcerated individuals based in Onondaga County prior to transfer to state correctional facilities. The Justice Center currently holds a maximum capacity of 605 inmates, classifying it as a medium-sized correctional facility.

== History ==
From its infancy, the Onondaga County Justice Center's purpose was to provide Syracuse and its surrounding municipalities a facility in which inmates who are awaiting transfer to correctional facilities are housed and have a "positively impact" those incarcerated individuals.

Construction of the facility took 28 months to complete and opened for use on April 3, 1995. Value for the construction project of the center finalized at around $42 million that was built on over a property size of 305,000 sq. ft. The architect for the design of the building is QPK Architects, and the construction company responsible for building this project is Hueber-Breuer Construction Co.

In 2017, after a years-long process and pressure from civil rights organizations, the Onondaga County Justice Center began to cease the punishment of solitary confinement to teens for minor violations. Leading up to this decision, during the time period from October 2015 to September 2016, more than 85 teens had been moved to solitary confinement over 250 times, often for violations like yelling, and dress code offenses. Human rights advocates and activates stated that the practices were "unconstitutional," and that solitary confinement "harms young minds."

Since 2022, plans to shut down the nearby Jamesville Correctional Facility began to come to fruition and discourse about the displacement of inmates became important in the communities affected directly by these changes. If allowed, the Jamesville Correctional Facility could move all of their inmates into the Onondaga County Justice Center, creating potential public safety concerns.

== Facilities ==
On the 300,000 sq. ft. property, the Onondaga County Justice Center houses 9 floors, each with different rooms and facilities per floor. Many features were included in the design of the building, such as underground tunnels, security systems, an infirmary, laundromat, library, dining hall, penthouses, and more.

In the housing section, numerous types of living quarters exist, such as housing security units, reception pods, general population pods, program pods, special housing units, medical pods, and behavioral health pods.

In 2007, Syracuse University partnered with the Justice Center and its related entities to enhance the library facilities at the center, along with educate the inmates who are eager to learn, and know how to read and write. Amenities included books, non-dated technology and materials, and cleaned up areas of education.

At the fourth tower in the Onondaga County Justice Center, plans were initiated in 2014 to create and build a new behavioral health unit designed to put more emphasis on caring for inmates with mental health conditions.

== Recent healthcare concerns ==
In the late 2010s and early 2020s various incidents at the justice center have sparked controversy and questions regarding the healthcare of inmates within the facility under the care of jail healthcare provider and contractor, NaphCare.

=== Suicide of Angela Peng (September 2021) ===
On September 1, 2021, 27-year-old Angela Peng was jailed at the Onondaga County Justice Center after violating her probation on petit larceny and criminal trespassing charges.

Two days later, around 9:12 P.M. on Friday September 3, Angela Peng hanged herself using a bed sheet in her cell at the Onondaga County Justice Center. Peng was found unresponsive and unconscious, and after justice center staff freed her and attempted CPR, Peng was rushed to Upstate University Hospital. Five days later, on September 8 she died from her injuries. Peng had a known history of mental health issues, which included alcohol and drug addiction in addition to multiple suicide attempts.

On September 2, the day prior to being found unconscious, Peng had been sent to the hospital after being seen in her cell on the floor indolent, unable to verbalize her words, and covered in feces and vomit. After 5 hours of laying in her cell in this state, she was taken to the hospital by EMS. Peng was hospitalized overnight, and hours later after being released she hung herself.

Prior to hanging herself on September 3, Peng was seen and noted by Justice Center staff experiencing similar symptoms as she had on September 2 for at least ten minutes. Despite her history and what had transpired the day before, Peng was not under constant supervision by staff.

A report conducted by the NY State Commission of Corrections later found that Peng was going through opioid withdrawals, and this was found to be neglected and ignored by the Justice Center medical staff.

After her death, Angela Peng's family sued Onondaga County for $10 million.

=== Suicide of Paul Watkins (December 2021) ===
On December 9, 2021, 38-year-old Paul Watkins was arrested and jailed at the Onondaga County Justice Center on second-degree misdemeanor contempt charges. At the time of his arraignment, Watkins behavior was noted as being aggressive and hostile.

After an initial interview with deputies, Watkins stated that he had no previous mental health history of suicide or struggles with addiction and because of this, was placed in general population where he would be mandated to be checked on by a deputy every thirty minutes.

On December 11, 2021, Watkins called his wife multiple times in a rage and later on December 15, a judge signed an order of protection which would prohibit Watkins from contacting his wife until December 31, his next court date.

On December 16, 2021, Watkins called his mother and made threats of suicide.

"...I want to die in here, I want to die, I want to die right now,” Watkins said in the call. “If I had a knife I'd slit my wrist right now, I'd cut my throat right now.” - Paul Watkins to his mother

Later that day on December 16, 2021 Watkins hanged himself and was found unresponsive in his cell. The next day, he was pronounced dead at Upstate University Hospital the next day.

Unlike the report on Peng's death the NY State Commission of Corrections did not criticize the medical staff or the deputies of the Onondaga County Justice center, and ruled Watkins death as a closed case suicide.

On February 25, 2023, Watkins spouse filed a lawsuit against Onondaga County and the prison's healthcare contractor: NaphCare in a wrongful death suit, citing how phone calls within the justice center are typically monitored and recorded, and how after these phone calls he was not placed on suicide watch which would cause for increased supervision.

=== Premature birth and death of infant in Justice Center (August 2022) ===
Cheree Byrd, a 35-year-old woman originally from New Jersey, had been held in the Onondaga County Justice Center since July 1, 2022 on a petit larceny warrant. On the morning of August 2, 2022, Byrd gave birth to an extremely premature infant who was later pronounced dead at Crouse hospital shortly after her birth.

For over two days, inmates in the jail heard Byrd screaming in pain, continuously asking for help from deputies. In response to her pleas nurses, contracted by Naphcare, gave Byrd Tampons and Tylenol. According to Tanique Jackson, an inmate and porter in the jail, this did very little to help Byrd as she continued to be in pain delivering her baby that she had been carrying for 23 weeks.

After her release from the Justice Center, Byrd was entered into a mental health facility in New Jersey. Byrd's mental health disorders, Bipolar Disorder and Schizophrenia, were heightened by the incident that took place in the jail, leading to her stay in the mental health facility.

Due to her mental health state, no funeral service was held for Byrd's infant child.

=== 2022 healthcare provider switch ===
On December 21, 2022, a little over a year after the deaths of Angela Peng and Paul Watkins, the Onondaga County jail announced that it was switching their healthcare provider within the prison, moving forward from NaphCare to Wellpath Care in a letter from Onondaga County Legislature chair Jim Rowley to the New York State Commission of Corrections.

Prior to the switch, the Commission of Corrections had serious concerns pertaining to the level of healthcare being provided by NaphCare at the justice center, particularly after the death of Angela Peng in September 2021. During their three-year stint as the healthcare contractor of the Onondaga County Justice Center, there were at least three deaths reported.

Wellpath Care, previously known as Correct Care Solutions, has held a contract as a healthcare provider for jails in Onondaga County, and was providing care in the county at the time of Chanel Lakatosz's death, an inmate who died enduring drug withdrawals.

In 2019, Wellpath Care was the subject of a 2019 CNN report of substandard health care provided by Wellpath Care that led to injuries and deaths at 120 prisons across 32 states in the U.S.

=== Suicide of Dustin Montanez (March 2023) ===
In March 2023, authorities inside the facility located a dead inmate's body dead by suicide, later identified to be 40-year-old Dustin Montanez, who was incarcerated for violating his probation.
