= Thomas Ben Dyett =

Thomas B. Dyett (October 1886 – 02 November 1971) was an American lawyer, public servant, and civil rights advocate in New York City.

Thomas B. Dyett was born in October 1886 in Harris Village in Montserrat in the British West Indies. He emigrated to the United States in 1913. He was a student at Howard University in Washington, D.C. where he earned a Bachelor of Arts degree cum laude in 1918 and a Bachelor of Laws degree magna cum laude in 1920. He also earned a Master of Laws degree from Boston University in 1921 and was admitted to the Massachusetts Bar. In 1922, he was admitted to the New York State Bar. He married Lily B. Ransom in Boston on June 28, 1924. They had no children.

Thomas B. Dyett was known as “The Dean of Black Lawyers” in New York City and helped found the Harlem Lawyers’ Association, which was a forerunner of the Metropolitan Black Bar Association. Mr. Dyett was an assistant district attorney in Manhattan from 1927 to 1937 and a Democratic delegate to the New York Constitutional Convention of 1938. He was the first Black member of the Committee on Character and Fitness of the New York Supreme Court, Appellate Division, which interviews applicants to the New York State Bar. In 1955 he was elected as a director of the New York County Lawyers’ Association. Mr. Dyett was also a founding partner of Dyett, Alexander & Dinkins, the leading Black law firm in New York City whose other partners, Fritz Alexander and David Dinkins, became the first Black judge on the New York Court of Appeals (the highest court in New York State) and the first Black mayor of New York City, respectively.

In public service, Thomas B. Dyett was appointed in 1940 by New York Governor Herbert H. Lehman as the first Black member of the New York State Commission of Correction. In 1952 he was appointed as the first Black member of the New York City Civil Service Commission. In the 1950s, Mr. Dyett also joined in the efforts of the New York City Board of Education (now known as the New York City Panel for Education Policy) to create a greater racial mix in the city's classrooms. He supported and often helped launch pro-Black programs in New York City public schools.

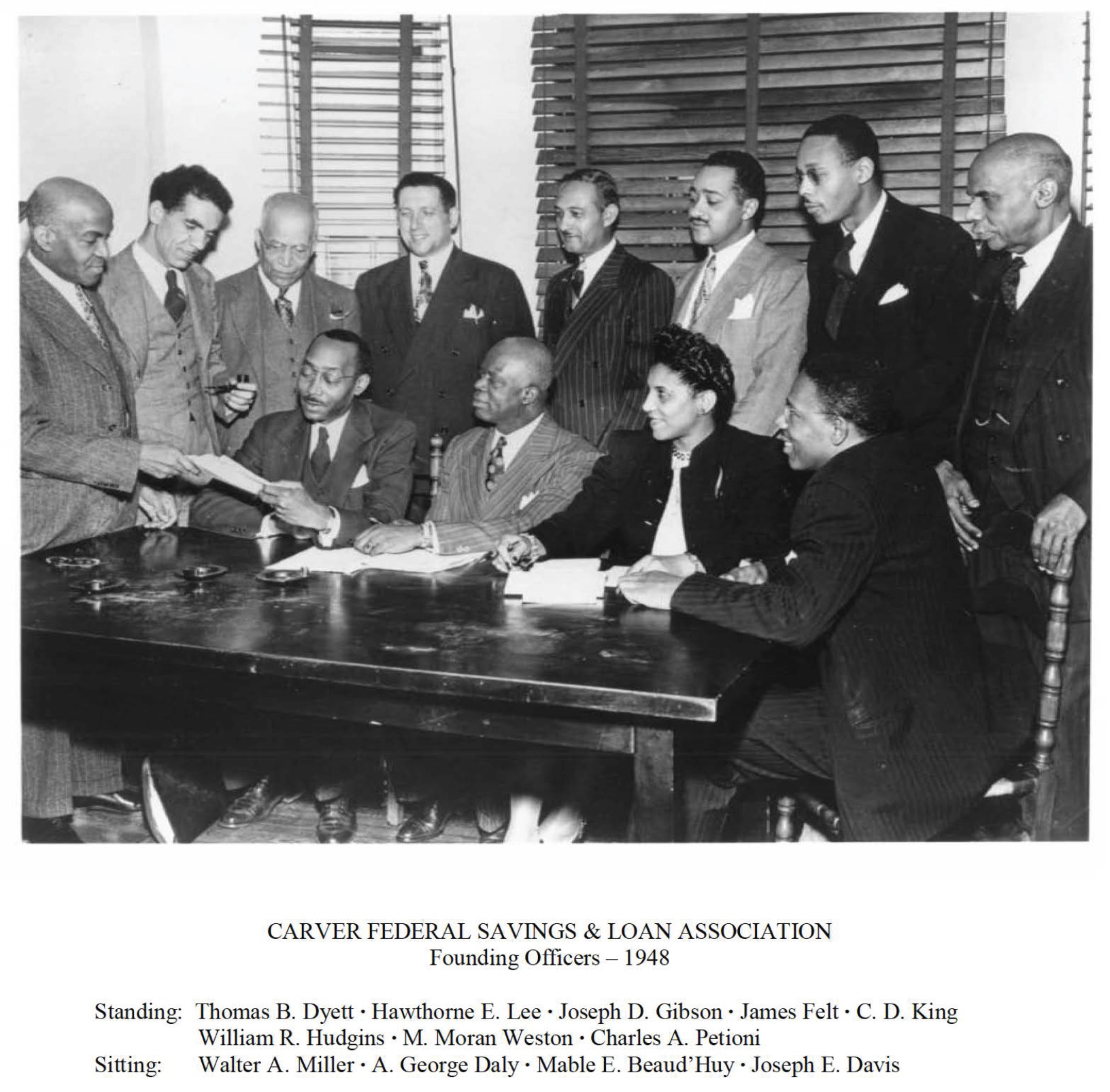
Thomas B. Dyett (standing on far left)

As an advocate for civil rights and a community leader in Harlem, Thomas B. Dyett was a member of the Board of Directors of the NAACP Legal Defense and Education Fund, and in 1948 a founding officer and General Counsel of Carver Federal Savings & Loan on West 125 Street in Harlem, which was the first Black-owned and managed banking institution in New York State and today is the oldest and largest continually Black-operated bank in the US. In 1958, he organized the Allied Federal Savings and Loan Association in Jamaica, Queens, New York. For many years he was General Counsel to the United Mutual Life Insurance Company, which was the only Black-organized, managed, and controlled life insurance company in New York State (it merged with MetLife in 1992).

Thomas B. Dyett lived on Sugar Hill in West Harlem at The Garrison Apartments, 435 Convent Avenue, Apartment 63. He died on November 2, 1971.
