= Hasan Tahsin Uzer =

Ottoman bureaucrat and politician

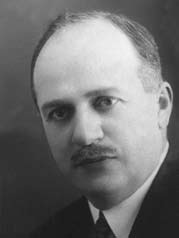
Hasan Tahsin (Uzer)

Hasan Tahsin Uzer (27 August 1878 – 5 December 1939; surnamed Uzer after 1934) was an Ottoman and later Turkish bureaucrat and politician. Throughout his career as a politician, Tahsin served as a governor to several Ottoman cities including Aydın, Erzurum, Van and the province of Syria. Thereafter, he served as deputy to the cities of Ardahan, Erzurum, and Konya. During the Armenian genocide, he was complicit in the Kemah massacres. After the war, he provided important testimony on the genocide.

== Life and career ==
Hasan Tahsin was born in Selanik, Ottoman Empire on 27 August 1878, he was of Albanian descent. He was the son of Ibarahim Ağa and Hatice Hanim, and the childhood friend of Mustafa Kemal Atatürk. In 1897, after finishing his studies in political science, Hasan Tahsin became the sub-district director of Prosotsani. In 1902, he became district governor. Tahsin would become district governor of several cities before becoming the Vali of Van in 1913. During his tenure, he attempted to counter the influence of the Kurds around Abdürrezak Bedir Khan, who were supported by the Russians. After the Russians and the Christian Assyrian tribes retaliated over massacres perpetrated by groups of the Ottoman Special Organization by also inflicting massacres against Kurdish villages, he suggested the deportation of the Assyrians from Hakkari. However, in 1914, Tahsin was removed from his post and transferred to Erzurum where he served as governor until 12 September 1916. He was then transferred to Syria and became the governor of the Syrian province. He resigned from this post on 18 June 1918, but was appointed governor of Syria again a few months later. However, when the Turkish Empire lost the province in late 1918, Tahsin was immediately transferred to Aydın. His governorship of Aydın lasted a few weeks. He was then elected to the Turkish National Assembly as a representative of Izmir. Tahsin was apprehended by British forces in the aftermath of World War I and sent to Malta as one of the Malta exiles. When eventually freed, he continued his political career. After the dissolution of the Turkish Empire and the formation of the Turkish Republic, he joined the Turkish National Assembly once more and represented several cities including Ardahan, Erzurum, and Konya in 1924, 1927, and 1933 respectively.

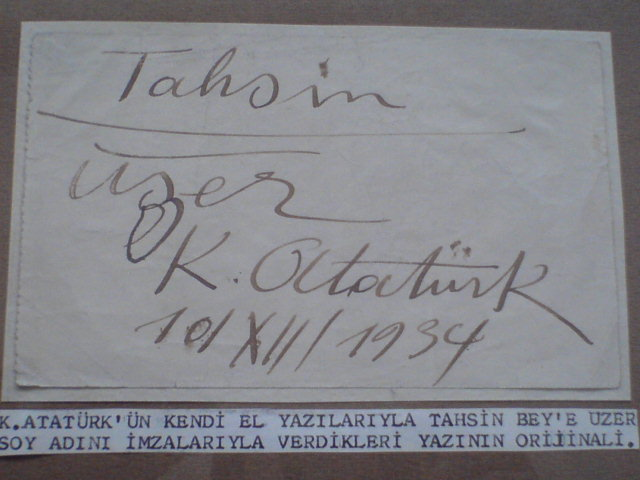
Given surname of Uzer to Hasan Tahsin, 10 July 1934, signed by Mustafa Kemal Atatürk

In December 1934, Hasan Tahsin adopted the last name Uzer through Atatürk's insistence during the introduction of the Surname Law.

Hasan Tahsin died in Istanbul on 5 December 1939. He was the father of two sons and two daughters.

== Armenian Genocide testimony ==
Missionary doctor Clarence Ussher, who was stationed in Van, relates in his memoir An American Physician in Turkey: A Narrative of Adventures in Peace and War, that Hasan Tahsin, the "strong and liberal-minded" vali of the province, whose governance was relatively peaceful, was replaced in February 1915 with Cevdet Bey, brother-in-law of the Turkish commander-in-chief, Enver Pasha. Cevdet Bey would eventually be considered responsible for the massacres of Armenians in and around Van. Ussher reported that 55,000 Armenians were subsequently killed in these massacres.

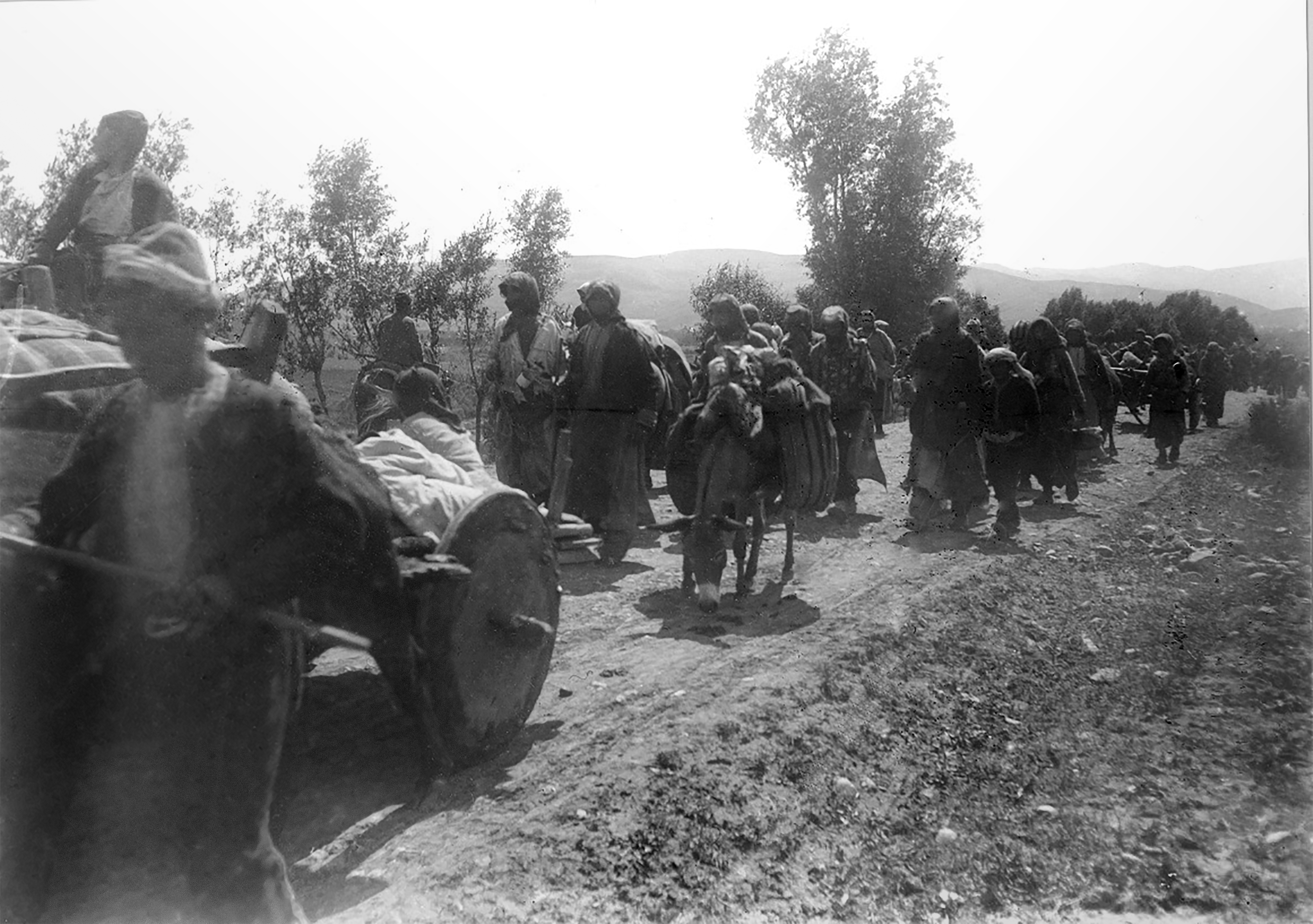
Deportation of Armenians from Erzurum

While Tahsin was governor of Erzurum, the deportations of Armenians, as part of the initial stages of the Armenian genocide, began. Upon receiving orders to likewise carry out deportations, Tahsin Bey was hesitant. He appealed to the Third Army commandment stationed near Erzurum to stall the deportations, since he believed that the deportees' lands, assets, and lives would be in jeopardy. Historian Raymond Kévorkian thus notes that Tahsin "joined the ranks of the valis, mutesarifs, and kaymakams who displayed a degree of reluctance to apply the deportation orders because they were perfectly conscious of what these implied for the people involved." Kévorkian adds that Tahsin's reaction to the deportations demonstrates that the military authorities were enforcing the deportation orders, and that the politicians had no other choice but to comply with the fait accompli. These military personnel, according to Tahsin himself, were under orders of the central government, and directly involved in the "cleansing" of the Armenians around Erzurum. Meanwhile, in a coded telegram he sent to the central government on 24 May 1915, Tahsin stated that the Armenians were not a threat. He then attempted to spare women, children, and the elderly from deportation, but failed; the army commandment systematically deported all Armenians. Tahsin had to comply with the deportation orders, albeit reluctantly, so as to prevent harsher measures from occurring. Tahsin reportedly told Max Erwin von Scheubner-Richter, the German vice consul of Erzerum, that he was against the deportations but that he had to "obey" in order to "soften it." Scheubner-Richter testified himself that Tahsin "did what he could, but he had no power." This was also confirmed by American missionary Robert Stapleton's testimony which says that Tahsin rejected all orders to massacre Armenians, but was "overruled by force majeure."

Tahsin served as governor of Erzurum until 10 August 1916, when he was transferred to Syria.

On 2 August 1919, in the aftermath of the Armenian Genocide, during the Mamuretulaziz trial, Tahsin testified that the Teskilat-ı Mahsusa, under the command of Behaeddin Shakir, was mobilized to kill Armenians. According to his testimony, when orders for deportation and massacre were issued by the Interior Ministry, he protested, saying the Armenians were blameless and that the local Armenian population was not staging a rebellion. He also pointed out that the Van rebellion would not have occurred if the Ottoman government had not provoked the Armenians. Tahsin also testified that he attempted to ensure the safety of the deportees within his jurisdiction. However, despite his efforts, many convoys were "destroyed" in the outskirts of the city.

Hasan Tahsin summarized his testimony during the trial as follows:

During the deportation of the Armenians I was in Erzurum ... The caravans which were subject to attacks and killings resulted from the actions of those who'd assembled under the name "Tes-ı Mahsusa." The Teskilat-ı Mahsusa was composed of two units. When I came back from Erzurum, the Teskilat-ı Mahsusa had turned into a major power and they’d become involved in the war. The Army knew about it. Then there was another Teskilat-ı Mahsusa, and that one had Bahaeddin Şakir’s signature on it. In other words, he was sending telegrams around as the head of the Teskilat-ı Mahsusa...Bahaeddin Sakir had a code. He’d communicate with the Sublime Porte and with the Ministry of the Interior with it. During the deportation he communicated with the Army as well. Bahaeddin Sakir had two different codes with which to communicate with both the Sublime Porte and the Ministry of War."

== Bibliography ==
- Ussher, Clarence D. (1917). An American Physician in Turkey: A Narrative of Adventures in Peace and War. Boston and New York: Houghton Mifflin Company.
- Kévorkian, Raymond H. (2010). The Armenian genocide : a complete history (Reprinted. ed.). London: I. B. Tauris. ISBN 978-1848855618.
- Winter, J. M. (2003). America and the Armenian Genocide of 1915. Cambridge University Press. ISBN 978-0-511-16382-1.
