= Brandram Boileau Ussher =

Canadian medical doctor (1845-1925)

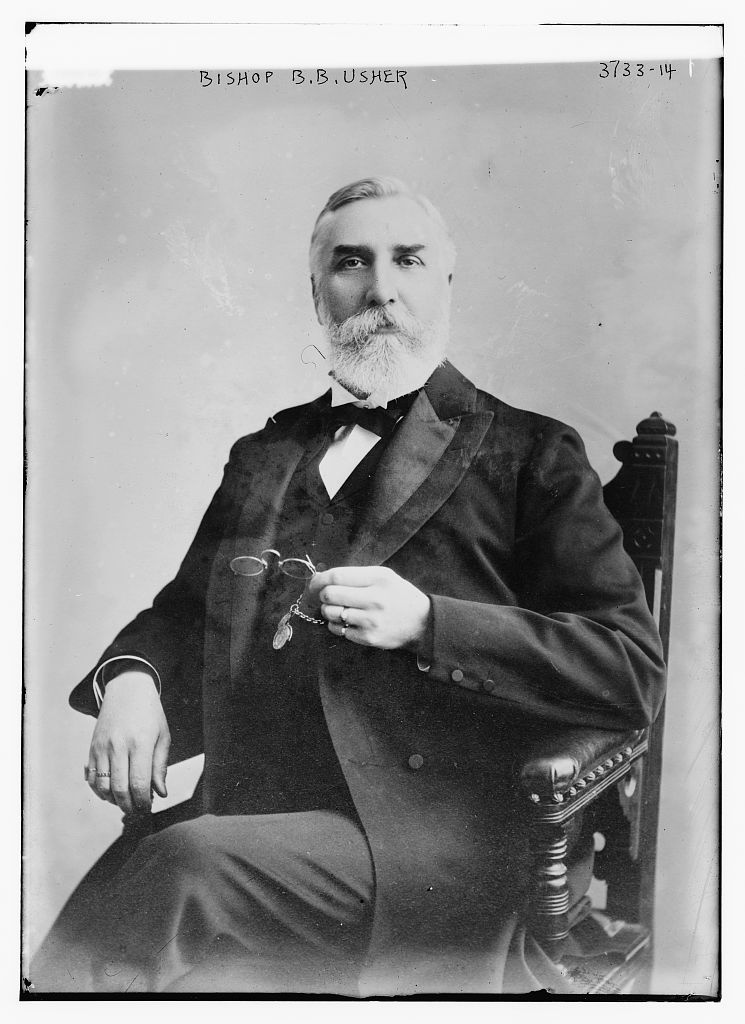
- Bishop Brandram Boileau Ussher circa 1915
- Born: August 6, 1845; Dublin, Ireland
- Died: 1925 (aged 79–80)
- Occupation: M.D.
- Spouse: Elizabeth Leonora Thompson
- Children: 5

Bishop Brandram Boileau Ussher, M.D. (August 6, 1845 - 1925) was a bishop of the Reformed Episcopal Church in Montreal.

== Biography ==
He was born on August 6, 1845, in Dublin, Ireland to Captain Richard Beverly Ussher and Henrietta Boileau. He was a descendant of Archbishop Henry Ussher.

He married Elizabeth Leonora Thompson and had five children, Sydney Lahmire Ussher; Clarence Douglas Ussher, Charles E. C. Ussher; George Richard Ussher, and Elizabeth Henrietta Ussher.

He died in 1925.
