= Ernest Yarrow =

British missionary (1876–1939)

- Born: 21 February 1876; London, England
- Died: 26 October 1939 (aged 63); Middletown, Connecticut
- Education: Wesleyan University
- Occupation: Christian missionary

Signature
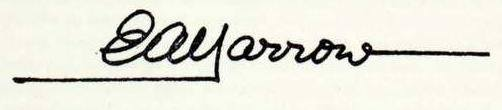

Ernest Alfred Yarrow (21 February 1876 – 26 October 1939) was a British Christian missionary and a witness to the Armenian genocide. He is also known for his leadership of a relief effort carried out by the Near East Foundation that saved and cared for tens of thousands of Armenian refugees.

Yarrow was stationed in Van vilayet, Turkey, in 1915 when an estimated 55,000 Armenians were massacred there by Turkish troops in the earliest stages of the genocide, and he was also an eyewitness to the subsequent defense of Van. He later publicly declared that "the Turks and Kurds have declared a holy war on the Armenians and have vowed to exterminate them." He also described the Van massacres and those which followed across Turkey as an "organized, systematic attempt to wipe out the Armenians."

== Early life ==
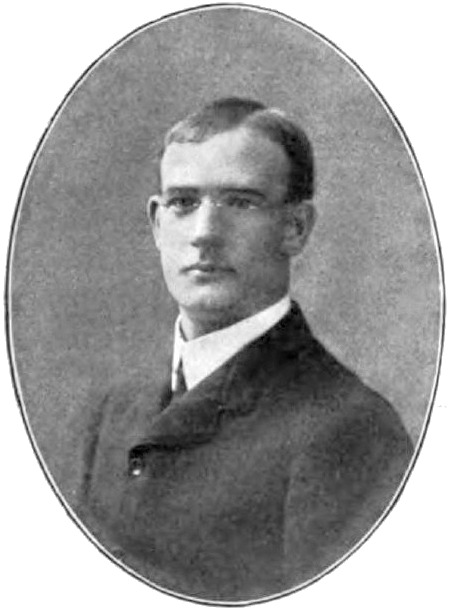
Ernest A. Yarrow

Ernest Yarrow was born in London, England, the son of Rev. Dr. William H. Yarrow, a Primitive Methodist minister, and Emma Radwell Yarrow. He and his family moved to the United States when Yarrow was one year old. Once in the United States, Yarrow attended the Northfield Seminary founded by Evangelical preacher Dwight L. Moody. After graduating from there in 1897, he continued his education in Wesleyan University in Middletown, Connecticut, graduating in 1901. At Wesleyan, he also played football, acquiring a reputation for strong tackling. He joined the local First Congregational Church and took theological courses at the Hartford Seminary. Upon graduating from the Hartford Seminary in May 1904, Yarrow married his roommate's sister, Jane Tuckley, in August of that year. Yarrow then joined the world missionary movement and was sent to Van, Ottoman Empire by the American Board of Commissioners for Foreign Missions, later succeeding Lieutenant General William N. Haskell as Director General of the Near East Relief for all of Russian Transcaucasia. Yarrow became very active in the Van college where he was in charge of the boys' school.

After returning to the United States for a brief visit in 1912, Yarrow and his wife returned to Van in 1913 to continue with missionary duties. He became president of the Van college right before World War I began and remained in Turkey throughout the war, sailing home to New York from Constantinople in 1922.

== Armenian genocide witness ==
=== Background ===
Having lost its Christian-majority Balkan possessions in the First Balkan War of 1912-13, fears had intensified in the Ottoman government that a similar push for independence by the Armenians—Turkey's largest remaining Christian minority, situated in the heart of Anatolia—might lead to the breakup of Turkey itself. Aware of the Ottomans' growing hostility, some Armenians, particularly in the vilayet of Van, had begun stockpiling weapons and ammunition for self-defence, fearing a repetition of the massacres of 1909, but these activities only strengthened Ottoman suspicions of Armenian intentions.

Following the outbreak of World War I, mutual distrust between Turks and Armenians reached almost intolerable levels when, in early 1915, Turkey was invaded both by the British at Gallipoli and Russia from the north. The Russian thrust into Van vilayet, spearheaded by Russo-Armenian units, was quickly blamed by the Ottoman leadership on alleged collaboration by the Van Armenians, and extreme measures against the mostly defenceless Armenian populace were authorized, resulting in massacres and the defense of Van, and precipitating the Armenian genocide.

=== Van massacres ===
In February 1915, the "strong and liberal-minded" governor or vali of Van vilayet was replaced with Cevdet Bey, (Note: Also rendered as Jevdet, Djevdet etc. Cevdet's actual name was Tahir Cevdet; "Bey" is a Turkish honorific.) brother-in-law of the Turkish commander-in-chief, Enver Pasha. The new vali, a subscriber to the view that a nascent Armenian "rebellion" was underway in Van, was unable to travel there until late March, when he arrived "accompanied by several thousand soldiers and Kurdish and Circassian irregulars". Cevdet quickly repeated an earlier demand that the Van Armenians supply 4,000 able-bodied men for work in labour battalions, but the Armenian leadership, fearful of the fate of such conscripts and concerned that full compliance would leave them defenceless, offered 500 men and payment of the standard exemption fee for the rest. Cevdet's response was to have four Armenian leaders killed and a fifth—an Armenian community leader in the town of Shadakh—arrested, but when the townsfolk surrounded the building where the latter was detained, demanding his release, Cevdet responded by ordering one of his regiments to "go to Shadakh and wipe out its people". The troops however, for reasons unknown, attacked and perpetrated massacres in several defenceless Armenian villages instead.

By this time, the alarmed Armenians were openly preparing for a defence of the city of Van. An attempt to avoid further bloodshed was made at this point by Yarrow himself and fellow American missionary Clarence Ussher, (Note: Ussher is one of the chief witnesses for these events, having later authored a book about them. See Clarence Ussher for more details.) who met directly with Cevdet on the Armenians' behalf. At this meeting, Cevdet demanded that fifty Turkish soldiers be stationed in the American missionary compound in Van, but this was rejected by the Armenians on the grounds that it would compromise their defensive positions. On April 19, Cevdet issued the following order to his forces in the vilayet:

The Armenians must be exterminated. If any Muslim protect a Christian, first, his house shall be burned; then the Christian killed before his eyes, and then his [the Moslem's] family and himself.

An estimated 55,000 Armenians in the vilayet were subsequently slaughtered by Cevdet's troops; however, several localities were able to successfully resist the Turkish attacks, most notably the city of Van itself, which would hold out for almost a month.

=== Defense of Van in 1915 ===
Armenians resisting in Van

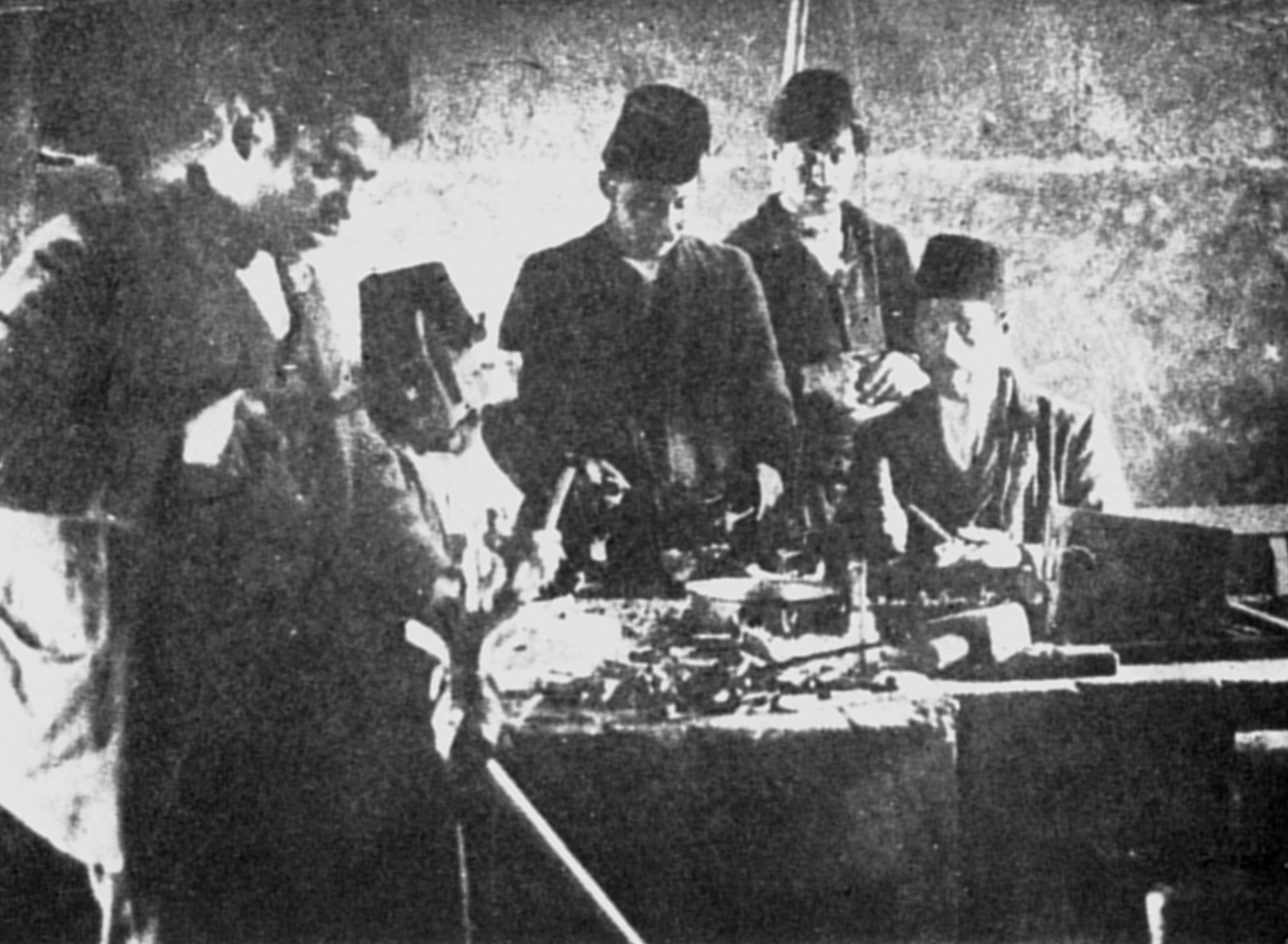
Armenians making cartridges by hand during the defence.

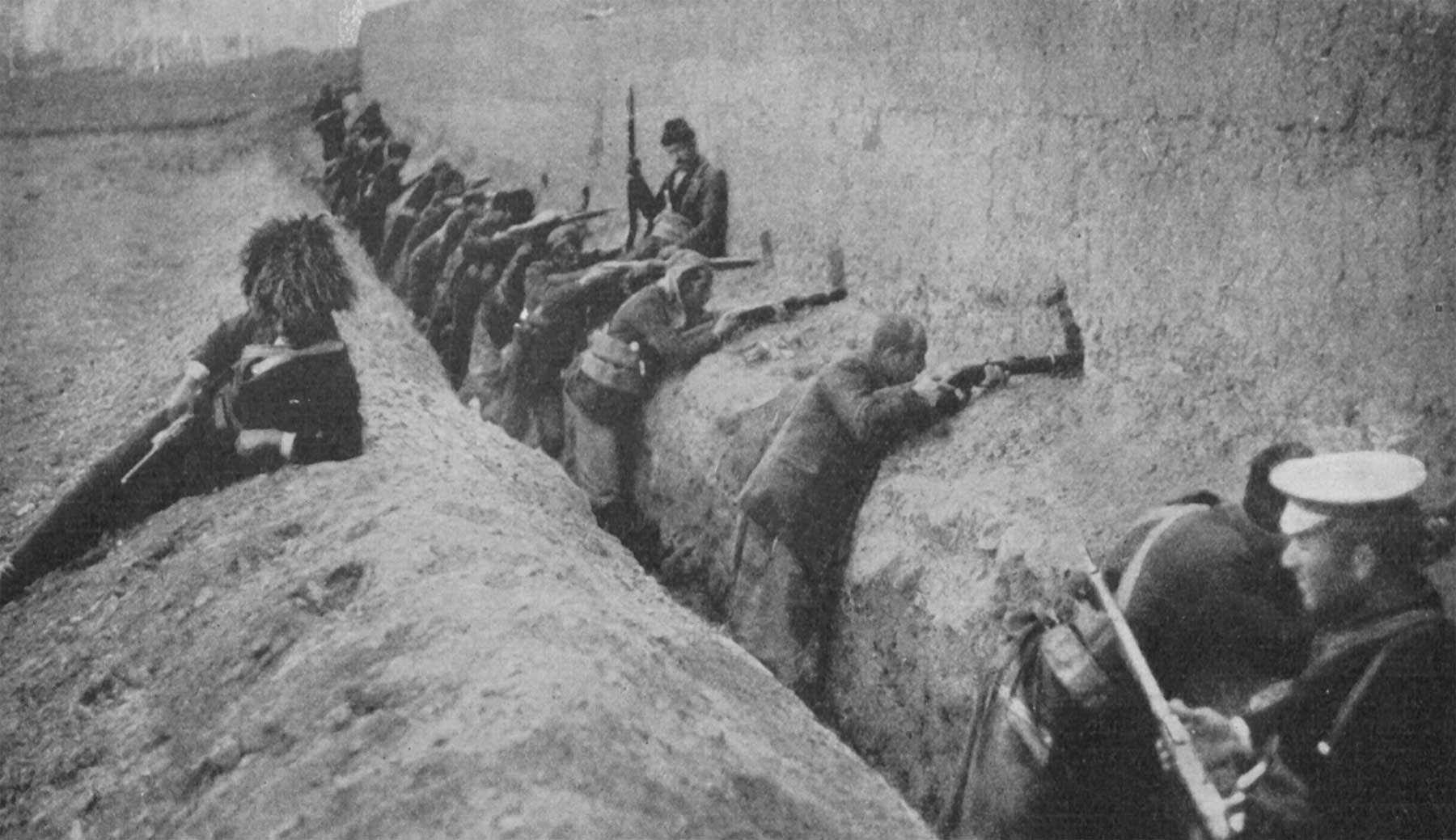
Armenians defending the trenches below the mission compound.

After the massacres ordered by Cevdet Bey on April 19 were largely concluded, the vali redeployed his troops for an attack on the city of Van itself. On the Turkish side were about 4,000 well-armed troops supported by artillery, while the city was defended by about 1,500 Armenian militia, who according to Yarrow were obliged to resort to "all kinds of weapons including blunderbusses, Colt pistols, old-fashioned rifles and even ... a couple of small cannon [made] out of old metal". This poorly armed force would nonetheless prove sufficient to hold off the Turks for almost a month until the relief of the city by Russian forces.

Yarrow and other members of the American mission were still located in the city when the siege began, and were thus able to provide eyewitness accounts. In an interview with an American newspaper a year later, Yarrow provided some details of the siege. Of the initial stages, he says:

When the people in the city heard of the coming of the Turks they knew that no mercy would be shown them, for half the population were Armenians and Syrians [Assyrians] and they knew the Turks would massacre them. There was great commotion and nobody knew what to do. The people decided to make a stand against the Turks ... The battle started when the Turks fired upon and killed a group of women outside of the city. The besieged area was about one mile across and a veritable hail of bullets swept over the walls for 28 days that the city of Van was under fire.

Yarrow himself assisted the Armenian defenders in maintaining governance during the siege. Yarrow's colleague, fellow missionary Clarence Ussher, notes that as the Armenians remaining in Van "had small experience in organization", it was "absolutely necessary" that someone with the right abilities attend to governance. Ussher states that Yarrow stepped into this role, taking the lead on many emergency committees and eventually "organiz[ing] a government with a mayor, judges, police, and board of health". Yarrow also helped organize a soup kitchen along with the manufacture and distribution of bread to those in need.

Toward the end of the siege, Turkish forces bombarded the American missionary compound, a violation of diplomatic immunity that Ussher suggests was made because of Turkish suspicion that the Americans had aided the city's defence. Of the bombardment, Yarrow states:

We had flying over the building where the missionaries were staying five American flags. One day the Turks turned their fire on the building and for two days they kept up an incessant firing of rifle bullets and shrapnel. Why they did this we do not know. The Turks knew, however, that we had helped the Armenians with their sick and had bettered sanitary conditions etc. We did nothing to assist them in a military way.

On 14 May, after almost a month of siege, Turkish forces withdrew due to the advance of Russian forces, who relieved the city a few days later. It was then discovered, in the words of Yarrow, that "while the siege was going on the Turks [had] killed every Armenian that they could find in the vicinity of the city", including women and children. After making this discovery, some Armenians began killing some of the city's surviving Turks in revenge. Later however, after order had been restored, Yarrow expressed surprise "at the self-control of the Armenians, for though the Turks did not spare a single wounded Armenian, the Armenians are helping us to save the Turks – a thing that I do not believe even Europeans would do."

With the lifting of the siege, the Armenians were to enjoy a brief ten-week period of self-governance, before advancing Turkish forces brought the city under threat once again. Thousands of Armenians fled the city rather than fall once more into Turkish hands, fleeing across the border to the relative safety of the Russian Caucasus, and Yarrow, by now sick with typhus, and the other American missionaries also decided to leave. Along the way, Yarrow describes how "in one locality the Turkish advance guard, secluded in the hills, poured rifle shots down upon the fleeing people. Hundreds of them were killed by the firing." Yarrow eventually made his way to Tiflis, and from there back to the United States where he would resume efforts to assist the Armenian people.

=== Conclusions ===
Speaking later of his experiences, Yarrow said "the Turks and Kurds have declared a holy war on the Armenians and have vowed to exterminate them." Of the overall genocide, he said: "It isn't war that the Turks carry on. It is nothing but butchering. The Turkish atrocities have not been exaggerated. From 500,000 to 1,000,000 Armenians and Syrians were slaughtered in a year." He described the massacres as an "organized, systematic attempt to wipe out the Armenians."

== Relief work ==
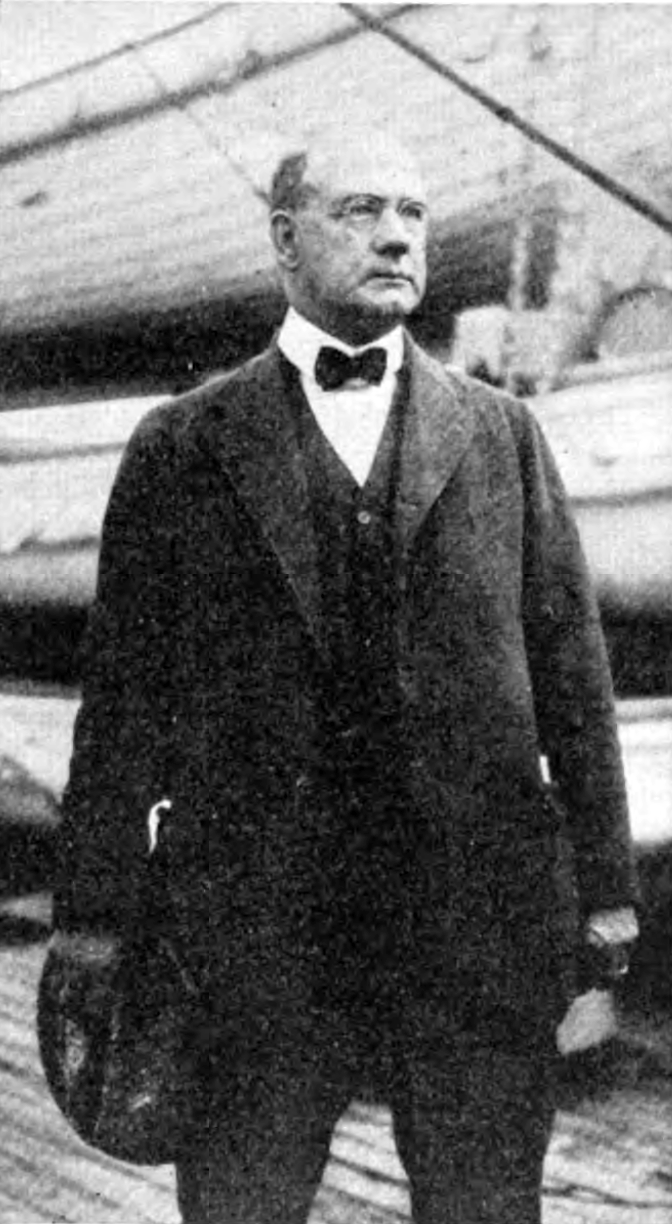
Ernest A. Yarrow

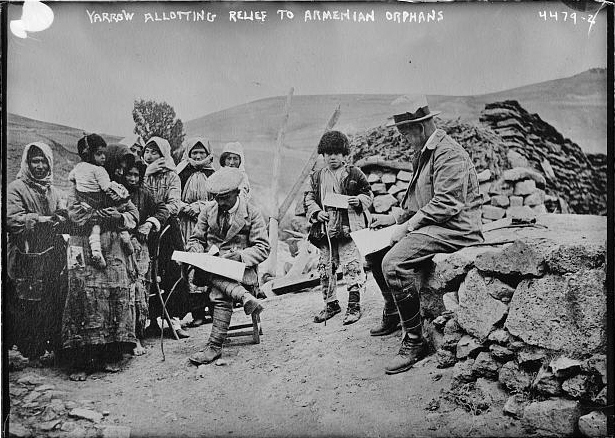
Yarrow helping Armenian orphans

By 1916, some 300,000 refugees of the Armenian genocide and other areas had settled in Russian Armenia under impoverished conditions. In a response to the crisis, in 1916, a relief committee was set up which aimed at assisting at least 250,000 Armenian refugees by providing food and shelter. Yarrow believed a stronger and independent Armenia would alleviate the refugee problems.

After staying for two years in the United States, Yarrow began helping the refugees in Armenia and became a staff officer for Colonel Haskell's mission by 1919. Of the later stages of the Caucasus Campaign, Yarrow said "the Turkish advance terrifies the Armenians; and the Caucasian tartars who are unfriendly to the Armenians surround them. There is danger that the whole Armenian race will be exterminated should the combination of these forces be successful."

In 1920, Yarrow took charge as the director of the Near East Foundation. At one point as director, he had responsibility for 30,000 children who had sought refuge in the Caucasus. In Armenia, Yarrow started a street cleaning program and other irrigation projects which provided jobs to some 150,000 refugees; through the program, many of the refugees earned wages which helped them finance their daily activities independently. He later remarked that "in training 30,000 children for future citizenship I feel that I have a real part in the development of the new Armenia."

In 1924, Yarrow petitioned the United States State Department to restore Armenian territory that was lost to Turkey in 1920 and 1921.

== Awards and decorations ==
Ernest A. Yarrow was awarded the Order of the Lion and the Sun by the Persian government, the highest decoration, for his relief efforts in the region. He also received four decorations from the Russian government and a medal from the Armenian government.

== See also ==
- American Board of Commissioners for Foreign Missions
- Armenian genocide
- Van Resistance
- Witnesses and testimonies of the Armenian genocide
- Clarence Ussher
