= Neville & Bagge =

American architectural firm

Neville & Bagge was a major residential architecture and construction firm in New York City between 1892 and 1917. Its first office was in Harlem at 217 West 125th Street.

The partners of Neville & Bagge were Thomas Neville Sr., a builder from Ireland, and George Arthur Bagge, an architect from Manchester, England. Mr. Neville's son, Thomas P. Neville, also joined the firm as an architect. Little more is known about them; the firm's records and drawings are lost. But Neville & Bagge buildings in Manhattan number in the hundreds.

Along with its competitors Schwartz & Gross and George Pelham, Neville & Bagge was one of the most prolific designers of multiple dwellings in Manhattan, especially in the uptown neighborhoods where construction was booming. In Morningside Heights: A History of Its Architecture and Development, Andrew S. Dolkart writes:

Although generally unheralded, it was Schwartz & Gross, George Pelham, Neville & Bagge, and other speculative architects who, by the sheer volume of their work, created the architectural character and texture of many of New York's neighborhoods . . .

Neville & Bagge applied for at least 531 new building permits between 1892 and 1917 and designed and built many residential landmarks.

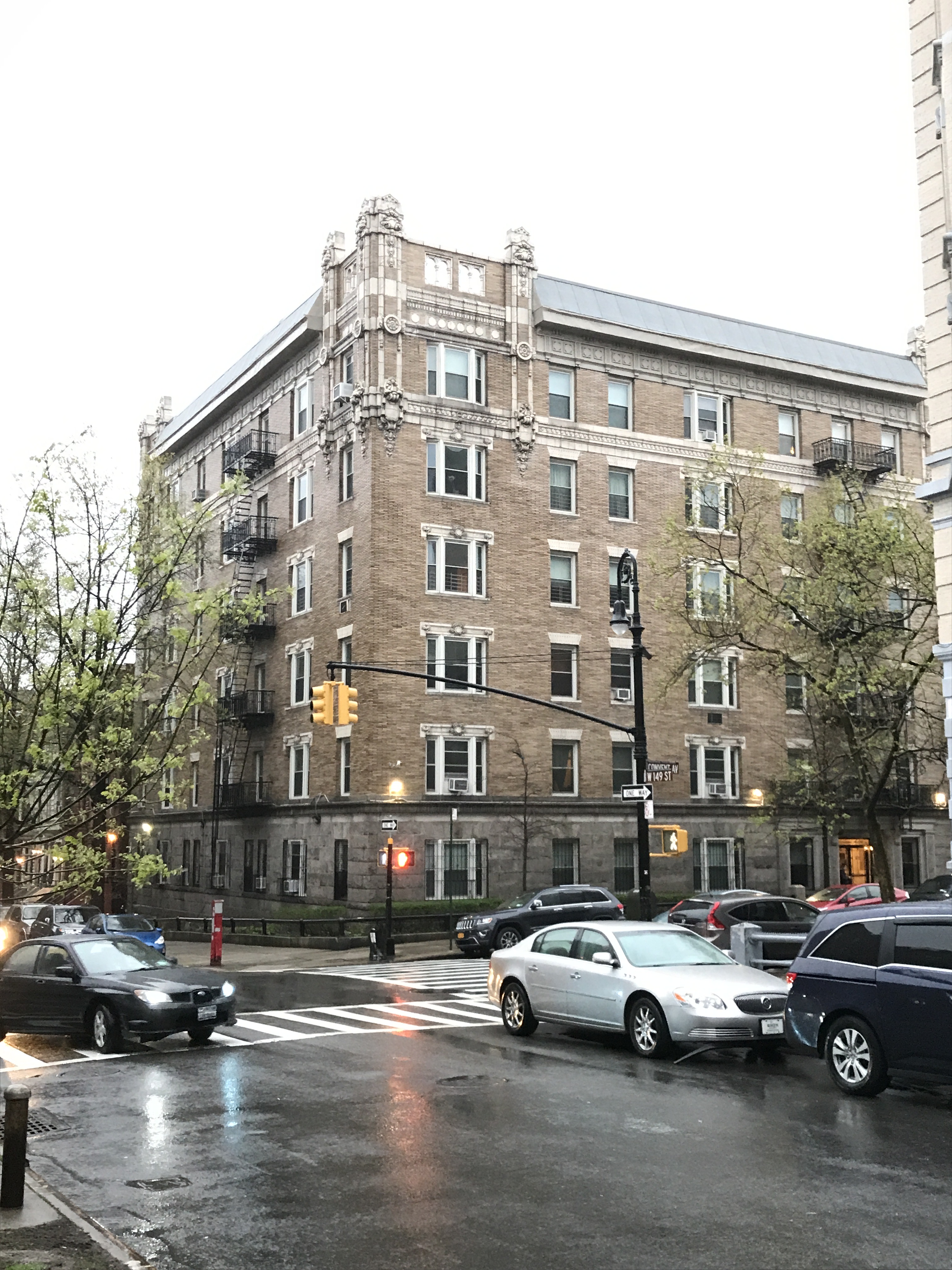
The Garrison Apartments, 435 Convent Ave., New York, NY 10031. Designed and built by Neville & Bagge, 1909-1910.

== Selected works ==
=== Residences ===
- The Garrison Apartments, originally called Emsworth Hall, at 435 Convent Avenue in the Sugar Hill Historic District, which was designated a landmark by the New York City Landmarks Preservation Commission in 2000 and placed on the National Register of Historic Places in 2002. The architectural style of this 6-story granite, brick, and terra cotta apartment building has been called Beaux-Arts Classical and French Renaissance Revival.
- The Cornwall, a 12-story Beaux-Arts building at 255 West 90th Street, noted for its elaborate balcony and window detail and ornate Art Nouveau cornice.
- The Netherlands at 340 West 86th Street, a 12-story building with a vaulted and coffered ceiling in its lobby.
- The 12-story Renaissance Revival building at 325 West End Avenue in the West End–Collegiate Historic District.
- The 6-story limestone, brick, and terra-cotta Neoclassical Revival building at 889 St Nicholas Avenue in the Hamilton Heights–Sugar Hill Northwest Historic District. The building housed Fat Man on Sugar Hill, a popular barbecue restaurant from 1935 to 1965.
- 8 Hamilton Heights apartment buildings on Broadway between West 140th and West 150th Streets: Ellerslie Courts at 3441-3459 Broadway; 3481-3483 Broadway; The Sarsfield at 3489-3495 Broadway; The Saguenay at 3488-3496 Broadway; The Castleton at 3480-3486 Broadway; Washington Court at 3504-3518 Broadway; The Mecklenberg at 3551-3559 Broadway; and The Rudsona at 3542 Broadway.
- El Nido Apartments at 121 St. Nicholas Avenue in Central Harlem, an ornate 7-story building with elaborate lintels over doors and windows and a heavy cornice.
- The 6-story cartouche-laden building at 537 West 121st Street, originally Reed House, now a Barnard College dormitory.
- The 12-story gabled building at 410 Riverside Drive, originally Riverside Mansions, now part of Columbia Residential.
- The 9-story building at 420 West 116th Street, originally the Sesrun Club, now part of Columbia Residential.
- The 9 Richardsonian Romanesque limestone-fronted row houses at 402 to 418 West 146th Street in the Sugar Hill Historic District.
- The row houses at 35 to 61 West 88th Street in the Upper West Side–Central Park West Historic District.
- The neo-Italian Renaissance apartment building at 72 Hamilton Terrace.
- The 12 Beaux Arts townhouses at 452 to 474 West 141st Street in the Hamilton Heights Historic District, which was placed on the National Register of Historic Places in 1983. These townhouses are noted for their design patterns and the decorative variety of their facades.
- The 6 French Second Empire townhouses at 418 to 426 West 144th Street in the Hamilton Heights Historic District. They are noted for their steep mansard roofs.

=== Churches ===
- The Roman Catholic Church of St. Paul at 113 East 117th Street in East Harlem, completed in 1908 in the Romanesque Revival style and designated a New York City Landmark in 2016.
- St. Cecilia's Convent, also known as the Regina Angelorum, at 112-118 East 106th Street in East Harlem, completed in 1907, designated a New York City Landmark in 1976, and placed on the National Register of Historic Places in 1984. Neville & Bagge's design united two existing buildings behind a new façade to house both a convent for the Sisters of Mercy and a home for working girls. Neville & Bagge's combined building is adjacent to St. Cecilia Roman Catholic Church, which was designed and built earlier by Napoleon Le Brun & Sons, from 1883 to 1887.
