= Elise Johnson McDougald =

American educator, writer, and activist (1885–1971)

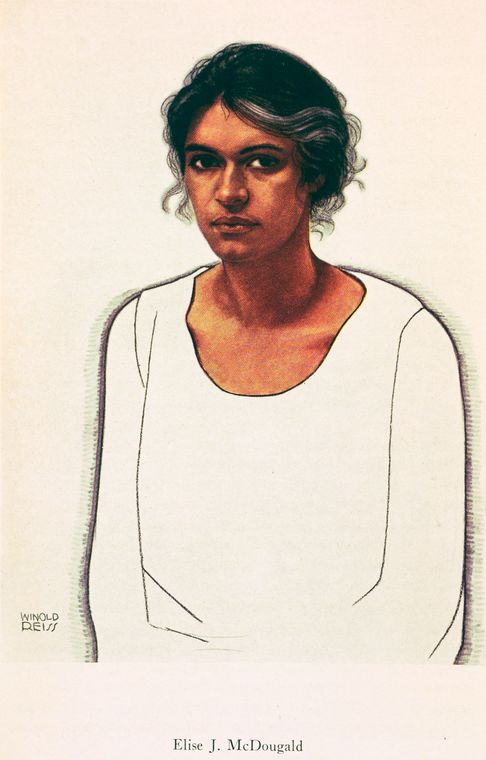
- Elise J. McDougald by Winold Reiss
- Born: Gertrude Elise Johnson; October 13, 1885; Manhattan, New York
- Died: June 10, 1971 (aged 85)
- Education: Girls' Technical School, Hunter College, Columbia University, New York City College
- Occupations: School principal, writer
- Spouse(s): Cornelius McDougald, Vernon Ayer
- Children: 2

Elise Johnson McDougald (October 13, 1885 – June 10, 1971), a.k.a. Gertrude Elise McDougald Ayer, was an American educator, writer, activist and first African-American woman principal in New York City public schools following the consolidation of the city in 1898. She was preceded by Sarah J. Garnet, an early African American woman principal from Brooklyn, New York, while it was still considered a separate city, who in 1863 began a 37-year-long career as principal in Manhattan's racial caste "colored" public schools. McDougald's essay "The Double Task: The Struggle for Negro Women for Sex and Race Emancipation" was published in the March 1925 issue of Survey Graphic magazine, Harlem: The Mecca of the New Negro. This particular issue, edited by Alain Locke, helped usher in and define the Harlem Renaissance. McDougald's contribution to this magazine, which Locke adapted for inclusion as "The Task of Negro Womanhood" in his 1925 anthology The New Negro: An Interpretation, is an early example of African-American feminist writing.

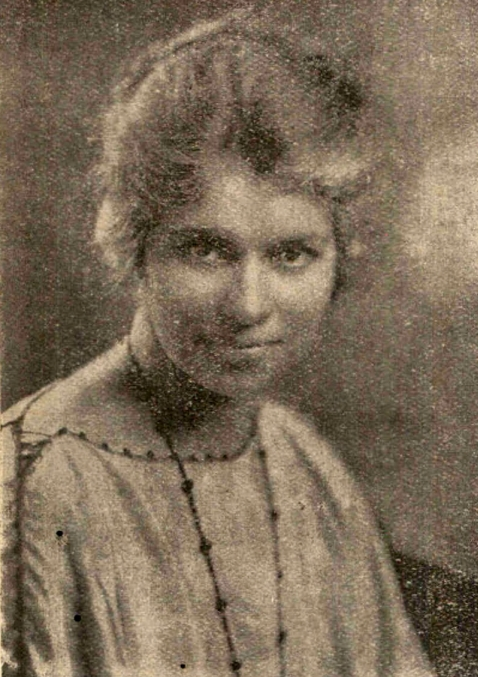

== Early life and education ==
McDougald was born in Manhattan, where her father, Dr. Peter Augustus Johnson, was one of the first African-American doctors and a founder of the National Urban League. Her mother was Mary Elizabeth Whittle, an English woman from the Isle of Wight, and her older brother, Travis James Johnson, was the first African-American graduate of Columbia University's College of Physicians and Surgeons in 1908. He was born in Chichester, England, in 1883, and the family moved to New York in 1884. McDougald spent her early days growing up in Manhattan, but also spent summers in New Jersey, as her father's family owned a truck farm there. She would later inherit and manage the farm.

McDougald became the first African-American graduate of the Girls' Technical School, now Washington Irving High School, in 1903, and was elected president of her senior class. After graduating from high school, she earned a teaching certificate from the New York Training School for Teachers. She never received her bachelor's degree, although she completed coursework at Hunter College, Columbia University and New York City College.

== Career ==
McDougald's teaching career began in 1905 at P.S. 11 in lower Manhattan. She resigned from P.S. 11 in 1911 to take care of her children. In 1916 she went back to work as a vocational counselor at the Manhattan Trade School. She then worked as an industrial secretary at the local branch of the National Urban League, where she started a survey documenting the working conditions of New York City's African-American women. The survey was sponsored not only by the Urban League, but also the Women's Trade Union League and the YWCA. Along with Rose Schneiderman, McDougald also helped organize laundry workers with the Women's Trade Union League. Her New Day for the Colored Woman in Industry in NY City, co-authored with Jessie Clark, was published in 1919. Her work as Executive Secretary for the Trade Union Committee for Organizing Negro Workers brought her into contact with other political organizers such as W. E. B. Du Bois and Frank Crosswaith. McDougald also worked as the head of the Women's Department of the U.S. Labor Department's Employment Bureau, and as a counselor for the Henry Street Settlement.

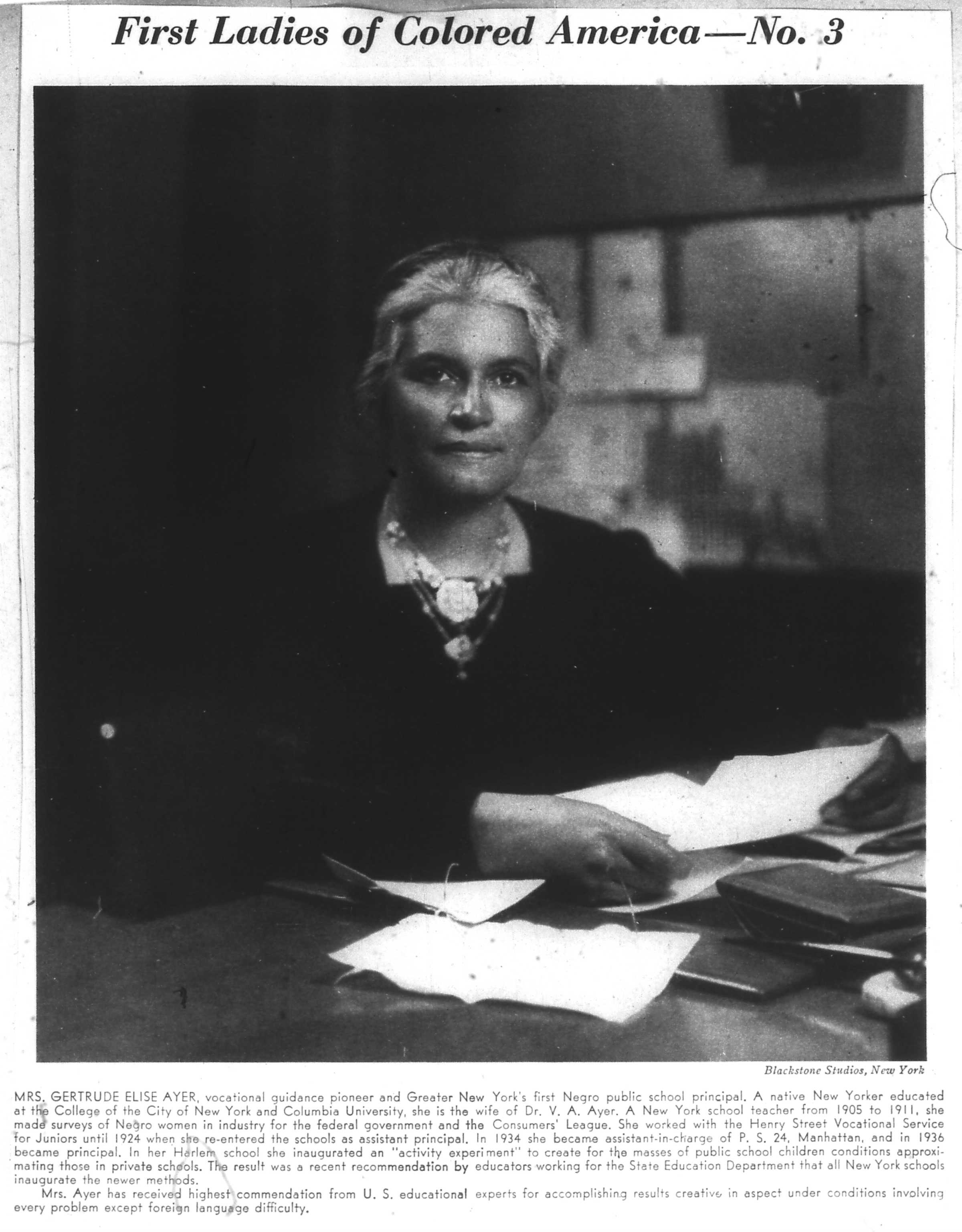
Mrs Gertrude Ayer, the first Black woman to be a Principal in the NYC public school system

In 1925, McDougald was selected as the assistant principal for Public School 90. In 1934, she was promoted to acting principal of Public School 24, making her the first black female principal at a New York City public school. In March 1925, her essay "The Double Task: The Struggle for Negro Women for Sex and Race Emancipation" was published in the edition of Survey Graphic magazine entitled Harlem: The Mecca of the New Negro (and was reprinted in the 1992 anthology Daughters of Africa, edited by Margaret Busby). Other articles by McDougald also appeared in The Crisis and Opportunity.

In 1935, she was temporarily appointed principal of P.S. 24 during the times of the Depression, where more than 60% of families and neighborhoods were unemployed. After the Harlem Riots of 1935, McDougald was a part of a community forum of interracial prominent New Yorkers who evaluated the conditions of its city and changes that needed to be made. She testified in the hearings and discussed how she wanted to work to gain the trust of parents, enforce a more relaxed atmosphere, and help provide relief for families struggling. This activism helped her become one of the first pioneers to originate the Activity Program, which placed a large emphasis on intercultural curriculum. This program implemented child-centered progressive education in New York City's public elementary schools. The overall idea for this program was to shift the emphasis on the subject matter to the children instead. Some changes to the schools included experiential learning, self-directed projects, interdisciplinary curriculum, and turn classroom experiments into "democratic living", and field trips to cultural institutions such as the Schomburg Center. She also opened the school to community support agencies, which helped establish a guidance center, a health and dental clinic, and the first school cafeteria in Harlem. While at P.S. 24, she taught James Baldwin. In 1945, she transferred to P.S. 119, where she served as the principal until her retirement. After her retirement in 1954, she remained active, writing a column in the Amsterdam News on Harlem schools, among other things.

== Personal life ==
McDougald married twice. In 1911, she married attorney Cornelius W. McDougald, who counseled Marcus Garvey, though they eventually divorced. She married her second husband, doctor Vernon A. Ayer, in 1928.

She was the subject of a pastel drawing by Winold Reiss, which appeared in Survey Graphic.

In the last years of her life, she lived on Sugar Hill in West Harlem at The Garrison Apartments, 435 Convent Avenue, Apartment 33. She died at her home there on June 10, 1971, at the age of 86. She was survived by her second husband and by two children of her first marriage, Dr. Elizabeth McDougald and attorney Cornelius McDougald Jr.
