= Tahir Pasha Bibezić =

Ottoman Brigadier General

Tahir Pasha Bibezić Tahir Bibezi Krajani
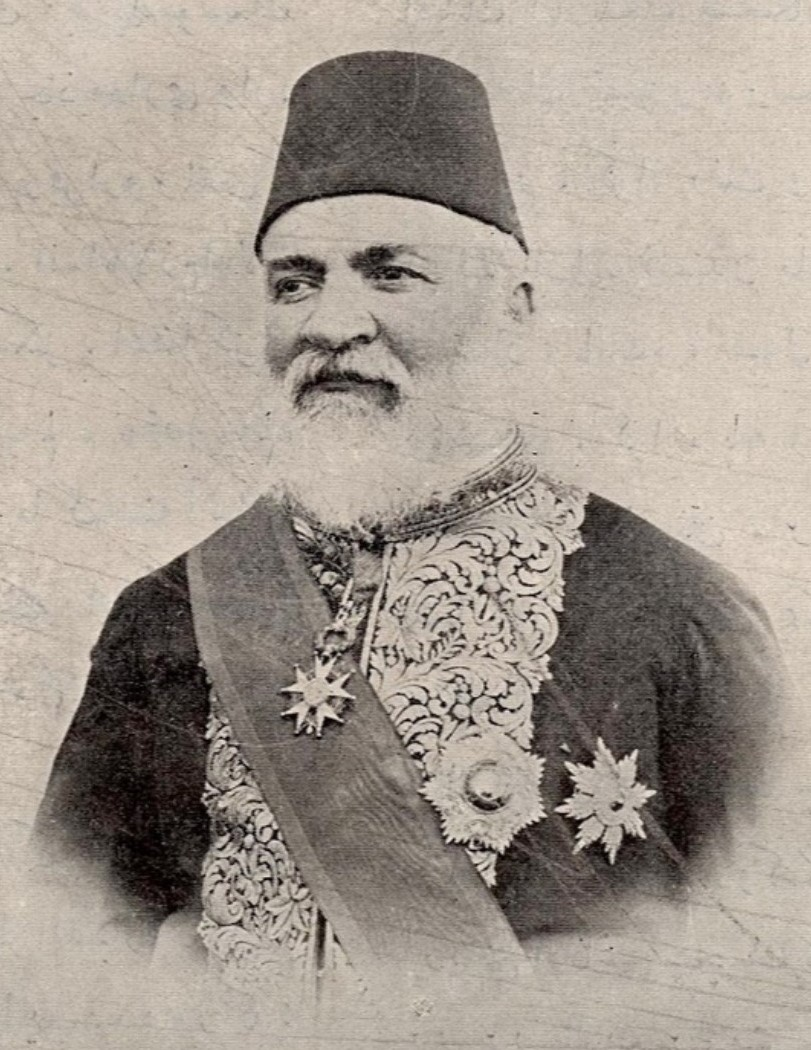

Personal details
- Born: 1848 Krajë, Vilayet of Shkodër, Ottoman Empire (modern Montenegro)
- Died: 1913 (aged 64–65) Constantinople, Ottoman Empire (modern Istanbul, Turkey)
- Parent: Haci Ali Efendi Bibezi (father)

Military service
- Allegiance: Ottoman Army
- Rank: Mirliva

Tahir Pasha Bibezić, Albanian: Tahir Pashë Bibezi Krajani (Arabic: طاهر باشا بن بزيك الكرياني Tahir Basha bin Bazik al-Karyani, Turkish: İşkodralı Tahir Paşa), was an Ottoman Brigadier General (mirliva) and prominent bureaucrat of Albanian origin from the region of Krajë, now in modern Montenegro. Born into a notable family from Podgorica, he began his career in 1868 and held various significant administrative positions throughout the Ottoman Empire, including chief secretary of Scutari, and governor of Mosul, Bitlis and Van. Known for his ability to restore public order and mediate local disputes, he played a key role in the Ottoman-Persian Border Commission and was a crucial figure during the turbulent years of the late 19th and early 20th centuries. His work exemplified the mobility and influence of Ottoman officials in shaping imperial policy across diverse regions.

== Early life and career ==
Tahir Pasha was born into a family from Podgorica, the son of Haci Ali Efendi Bibezi (known in Turkish as Bilbez). He commenced his career in 1868 in Podgorica as a prominent Ottoman official in the Chamber of the City (Podgoriçe Kazası Tahrirat Odası) and became the secretary of the Podgorica Land Registry (Podgoriçe Tapu Kitabeti) in 1872.

== Career During Ottoman Reforms ==
Following significant changes in the Ottoman Empire, such as the Great Eastern Crisis and Montenegro's independence in 1878, Tahir Pasha was expelled from Podgorica to the Shkodra Province. Due to his prior experience with Ottoman administration in Podgorica, he was immediately appointed as the chief secretary of the Scutari Province. In 1880, after temporarily serving as chief secretary in Thessaloniki (Selânîk Mektûbçuluğu), he was transferred to several locations, including Bitlis, Mosul, and Van (1898-1906), briefly in Trabzon (1907), and then again in Bitlis (1907–08), Erzurum (1908–10), and Mosul (1910–12).

== Frontier Administration and Conflict Resolution ==
Tahir Pasha was a prominent frontier official (serhad memurları) and a significant policy implementer, often tasked with mediating and investigating local disputes. His extensive governance experience, spanning thirty-three years in the eastern provinces, was central to his reputation for restoring public order and calming social unrest. As a committed bureaucrat, he was appointed as the commission chairman for the Ottoman-Persian Border Commission (1905–08). This appointment came during a period when the dispute escalated in 1905, with Iran supporting tribal chiefs in the frontier zone who interfered with pro-Ottoman tribes in Urumiah (see Ottoman invasion of Persia (1906)). Tahir Pasha was tasked with resolving this border conflict. In a pamphlet, he criticized the Ottoman centralization efforts towards Kurdish tribes as a failure that allowed Iranian interference in the region.

== Impact of the Young Turk Revolution ==
In 1908, with the outbreak of the Young Turk Revolution, the new government established by the Committee of Union and Progress (CUP) deemed it unnecessary to alert Ottoman troops regarding the status quo line with Iran due to the critical financial situation. Although the issue remained unresolved for several years, this example illustrates how an ascendant local from the Ottoman-Montenegrin borderland became a mobile subject at the Ottoman-Persian border, demonstrating the agency of migrants who shaped Ottoman policy. Scholars often overlook the mobility of trans-regional biographies within the Ottoman Empire and its former territories, despite multiple examples connecting vastly different (post) Ottoman regions and communities.

== Influence of the Bibezić Family ==
In addition to the political connections between the Bibezić family and the central government, Tahir Pasha's nephews, Mustafa Nuri and Haydar Hilmi Vaner, also emerged as extensions of extensive family networks in the administrative development of the empire. They both began working with their well-connected uncle on projects that explicitly tied the Ottoman peripheries to the central government and the global world. Mustafa Nuri worked in the Ministry of Foreign Affairs as an important intermediary between Ottoman institutions and foreign capital projects. Consequently, the aforementioned migrants used their opportunities and capacities to penetrate the heart of the Ottoman bureaucracy and establish connections with the broader world.

== Contributions of Mustafa Nuri and Haydar Hilmi Vaner ==
The regions of Montenegro provided the Ottoman bureaucracy with numerous examples, including 'liberal' reformers such as Cevdet Bey, Mustafa Nuri, and Haydar Hilmi Vaner. The rise of the CUP gave new impetus to these 'liberals'. According to the Austro-Hungarian consul in Mitrovica, one such personality was Vaner, who was 'acting as a Young Turk or as an Albanian. He was born in Podgorica in 1875 and joined the Ottoman administration in the Van vilayet (1889) at a very young age. His positions as district governor of Mitrovica and Köprülü in Ottoman Macedonia provided him with several opportunities to promote liberal ideas within the Young Turk movement. Together with CUP members Müşir Kazım Pasha and Haci Adil Bey (Minister of the Interior), he joined Sultan Reşad on his tour of Rumelia between June 5–26, 1911. During the Sultan's visits to several cities (Thessaloniki, Skopje, Prizren, Prishtina, Bitola), he served as the primary translator from Ottoman Turkish into Albanian. Vaner was also known for maintaining contacts with his family members in the Scutari vilayet, enabling him to calm the revolts in the Malësia region in 1911.
