= Cevdet Tahir Belbez =

Ottoman-Albanian governor (1878-1955)

Personal details
- Born: 1878 İşkodra, Vilayet of Shkodër, Ottoman Empire (modern Albania)
- Died: 15 January 1955 (aged 77) Istanbul, Turkey
- Parent: Tahir Pasha (father)

Djevdet Bey or Cevdet Tahir Belbez (1878 – January 15, 1955) was an Ottoman Albanian governor of the Van vilayet of the Ottoman Empire during World War I and the Siege of Van. He is considered responsible for the massacres of Armenians in and around Van. Clarence Ussher, a witness to these events, reported that 55,000 Armenians were subsequently killed. Djevdet is also considered responsible for massacres of Assyrians in the same region.

== Biography ==
He was born in Shkodra, Ottoman Empire, as the son of Tahir Pasha Bibezić, who was a vali of Van, Bitlis, and Mosul.

In 1914, as the Kaymakam of the Sanjak of Hakkari, Djevdet worked closely together with the Ottoman Special Organization to coordinate the defense against the Russians and possible offensives against the region around Lake Urmia. He wrote to Talaat Pasha that Urmia could have been captured with some more support of his superiors. He succeeded Hasan Tahsin Bey as Governor of the Vilayet of Van in 1914. As such, he established an alliance with the local Kurdish chieftain Simko Shikak and ordered a massacre of about 800 Assyrians in Salmas in March 1915. In July 1915, he led the massacre of the 15,000 Armenians of Bitlis. Djevdet was a leader of the Committee of Union and Progress (CUP) and the brother-in-law of Enver Pasha. After the end of World War I and the subsequent Turkish War of Independence, he served as a commander of the Turkish Air Force. As commander of the air force, he played an important role in crushing the Ararat rebellion by Kurdish rebels in 1930 and ordered the air force to bombard Kurdish rebel positions around Mount Ararat eventually forcing the capitulation of the Kurdish fighters. The air assault campaign also resulted in the indiscriminate aerial bombarding of Kurdish civilians resulting in entire villages reportedly being wiped out according to the New York Times newspaper. He died in Istanbul on 15 January 1955.

== In popular culture ==
Djevdet Bey was portrayed by Elias Koteas in the 2002 film Ararat.
