= The Cornwall =

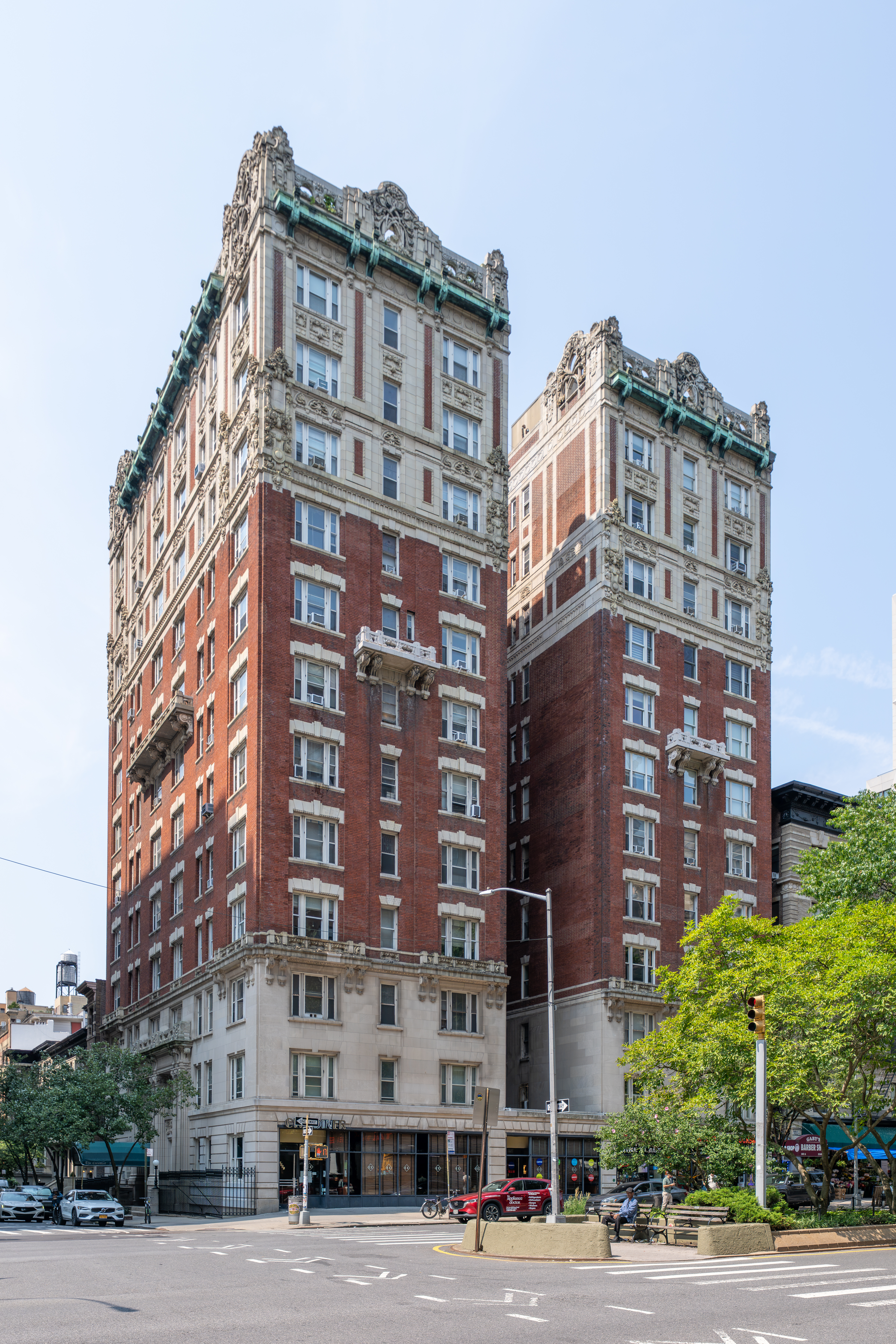
- The Cornwall as seen from across Broadway (2026)
- Interactive map of the The Cornwall area
- Alternative names: Cornwall Apartments

General information
- Type: Housing cooperative
- Location: 251-257 West 90th Street, Upper West Side, Manhattan, New York City, U.S.
- Coordinates: 40°47′28″N 73°58′29″W
- Completed: 1909

Height
- Height: 135 feet (41 m)

Technical details
- Floor count: 12

Design and construction
- Architecture firm: Neville & Bagge
- Developer: Arlington C. Hall, Harvey M. Hall

The Cornwall is a luxury residential cooperative apartment building at 255 West 90th Street on the Upper West Side of Manhattan, New York City. Located on the northwest corner of Broadway and 90th Street, it was designed by Neville & Bagge and erected in 1909. The developers were Arlington C. Hall and Harvey M. Hall. The twelve-story brick and stone building is noted for its elaborate balcony and window detail, and the "spectacular" design of its "extraordinary" ornate Art Nouveau cornice, which the AIA Guide to New York City called "a terra-cotta diadem." In 1991, the building's owner-occupants paid $600,000 to have the cornice and ornamented balconies replaced with terra cotta replicas of the originals.

Notable residents include New York Times "Streetscape" columnist and architectural historian Christopher Gray.
