= Henry Kempton Craft =

Henry Kempton Craft (18 October 1883 – 31 August 1974) was an American YMCA executive and civil rights activist.

== Life ==
Henry Craft was born in Charleston, South Carolina, the son of Charles P. and Emeline (Kinloch) Craft. He was the grandson of William and Ellen Craft, enslaved people and abolitionists from Macon, Georgia, who became famous for their daring escape from slavery in 1848 and their 1860 book, Running a Thousand Miles for Freedom; Or, the Escape of William and Ellen Craft from Slavery. Their book was one of the most compelling slave narratives published before the American Civil War.

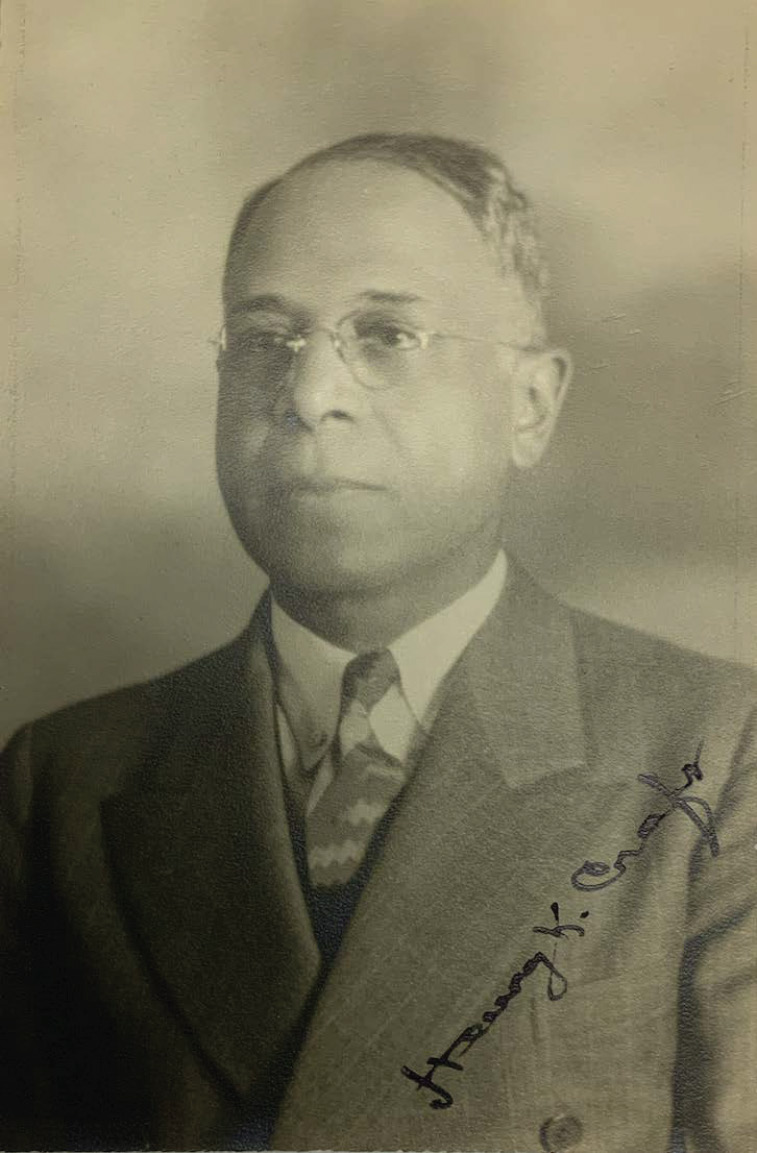
Henry Kempton Craft (1883–1974)

Henry Craft may have attended the Avery Normal Institute, the first accredited secondary school for African Americans in Charleston, South Carolina. Records show he received his high school education at the Mount Hermon School for Boys (now the Northfield Mount Hermon School) in Gill, Massachusetts, from 1899 to 1902. He attended Brown University for one academic year (1903–1904), and completed his B.S. degree in electrical engineering at Harvard University in 1907. Craft returned to Harvard in 1915 to study social service work.

Henry Craft married Virginia "Bessie" Trotter on 25 September 1912. They had two children. In the 1930s and 1940s, Henry Craft and his family lived on Sugar Hill in West Harlem in New York City at The Garrison Apartments, 435 Convent Avenue, Apartment 35. He became a widower in 1949, and 5 years later he married Pearl Fallings. Mr. Craft served as a senior warden of St. Philip's Episcopal Church on West 134th Street in Harlem, which at the time of his death in 1974 was the largest Episcopal congregation in the US.

== Career ==
After graduating from Harvard, Henry Craft taught at the Tuskegee Institute from 1908 to 1911, and worked as an electrical engineer at the Commonwealth Edison Electric Company in Chicago from 1911 to 1914. He worked as a teacher in Indianapolis, Indiana from 1915 to 1918.

Henry Craft had a long career with the YMCA starting in 1918 when he served as the Boy's Work Secretary on the International Committee. In 1921 he became the Executive Secretary of the YMCA of Gary, Indiana; in 1923 the Executive Secretary of the Pine Street YMCA in St. Louis, Missouri; in 1929 the Executive Secretary of the YMCA of Pittsburgh, Pennsylvania; and in 1932 the Executive Secretary of the Harlem YMCA on 135th Street in New York. He remained the leader of the Harlem Y for 14 years, retiring on March 1, 1946.

After his career with the YMCA, Henry Craft was appointed by New York Governor Thomas E. Dewey as the field coordinator for the New York State Commission Against Discrimination, now known as the New York State Division of Human Rights.

In 1941, along with A. Philip Randolf, Walter White, Lester Granger, Frank Crosswaith, Layle Lane, and Rayford Logan, Henry Craft was an organizing member of the Negroes' Committee to March on Washington for Equal Participation in National Defense, which planned to mobilize 50,000 to 100,000 marchers on July 1, 1941, to protest the Jim Crow defense program after previous efforts to persuade President Franklin Roosevelt to desegregate the military were unsuccessful. A week before the march, Roosevelt signed Executive Order 8802, which prohibited ethnic or racial discrimination in the nation's defense industry (including in companies, unions, and federal agencies engaged in war-related work) and created the Fair Employment Practice Committee. Though not a law, Executive Order 8802 was the first federal action to promote equal opportunity and prohibit employment discrimination in the United States, and it represented the first executive civil rights directive since Reconstruction. As a result of this victory, the 1941 March on Washington was called off by its organizing committee.
