= Clarence Ussher =

American physician and missionary (1870-1955)

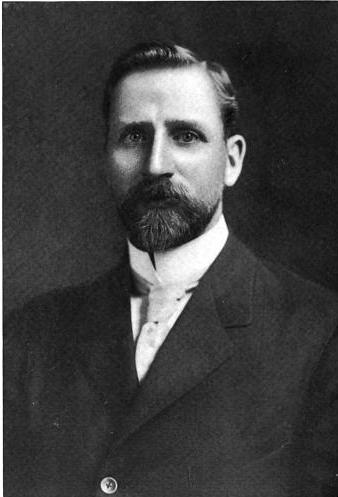
- Born: September 5, 1870; Aurora, Illinois, United States
- Died: September 20, 1955 (aged 85); Los Angeles, California
- Occupations: Physician, Christian missionary, and witness to the Armenian Genocide

Clarence Douglas Ussher (September 9, 1870 – September 20, 1955) was an American physician and missionary in the Van region during the Armenian genocide, where he reported that 55,000 Armenians had been killed. In 1917 Ussher published a memoir regarding his experience in Van, titled An American Physician in Turkey: A Narrative of Adventures in Peace and War. It is considered one of the most detailed eyewitness accounts of the events. Ussher openly blamed the Ottoman government for the systematic massacres of Armenians. His accounts of the Armenian genocide were depicted in the 2002 film Ararat. He was the husband of Elizabeth Barrows Ussher, who was also a witness of the genocide.

== Early life and work ==
Clarence Douglas Ussher was born on September 9, 1870, in Aurora, Illinois. His father became the Bishop of Canada and eventually moved with the family to Montreal. In Montreal, Ussher received his early education; he continued his studies at the Reformed Episcopal Seminary in West Philadelphia, Pennsylvania. After spending some time in Wyoming for missionary work, he moved to Kansas City, where he continued his studies at the University Medical College.

After graduation, Ussher remained in Kansas City until 1898, when he decided to join the global missionary movement. Setting his work aside in Kansas City, Ussher was sent by the American Board of Commissioners for Foreign Missions (ABCFM) to Harput, Ottoman Empire, where he was also to pursue his career as a practicing physician. Turkish sensitivities to the Armenian Question became evident to Ussher at the Ottoman border, where his dictionary was confiscated because it contained the words "liberty" and "revolution"—forbidden in Turkey at this time to Armenian and Turk alike; the customs officers also demanded the removal of maps from Ussher's Bible because they contained the word "Armenia".

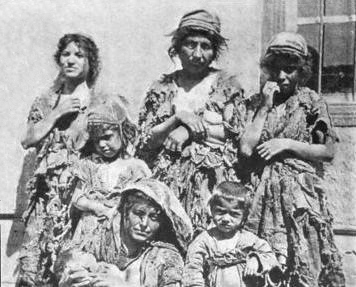
A group of destitute Armenians—photo from Dr. Ussher's collection

Ussher remained in Harput for a year, after which he was sent to Van because the village required a physician. When he arrived in Van, he noticed that the village was still heavily damaged from the Hamidian massacre and the population still traumatized. Ussher immediately began his work in orphanages where hundreds of Armenian orphans of the Hamidian massacres were being housed. Ussher distrusted the 1908 governor of Van, opining that he "used every means in his power to incite Armenians to revolt in order to have a pretext for massacring them".

== Genocide witness ==
=== Background ===
In the First Balkan War of 1912–1913, the Ottoman Empire had lost its Balkan possessions to Christian uprisings, intensifying fears in the Turkish homeland that the Empire's increasingly restive Armenian Christian minority—with the assistance or encouragement of Western governments—might also attempt to establish an independent state, resulting in the breakup of Turkey itself. As a result of the wars, at least half a million Muslim Ottomans' from the former Balkan possessions of the Empire sought refuge in Turkey, sparking a desire for revenge among many Turks. Distrust and suspicion of Armenians reached a peak following the outbreak of World War I, when a successful advance of Russian troops across the Turkish border into the heavily Armenian-populated vilayet of Van in early 1915 was blamed on Armenian disloyalty, leading the Turkish government to adopt a set of extreme measures which would culminate in the Armenian genocide.

=== Van "reign of terror" ===
As Ussher relates in his memoir An American Physician in Turkey: A Narrative of Adventures in Peace and War, he was stationed in the American hospital in Van when in February 1915, the "strong and liberal-minded" governor or vali of the province was replaced with Cevdet Bey, (Note: Also rendered as Jevdet, Djevdet etc. Cevdet's actual name was Tahir Cevdet; "Bey" is a Turkish honorific.) brother-in-law of the Turkish Commander-in-Chief, Enver Pasha. The new vali was unable to travel to Van until late March, when he arrived "accompanied by several thousand soldiers and Kurdish and Circassian irregulars".

At the time of Cevdet's arrival in the Van vilayet, volunteer Armenian units ahead of the advancing Russians were employing guerrilla tactics in the Turkish rear, while substantial numbers of Turkish deserters in the province had turned to brigandage, and Turkish commanders believed both groups were receiving support from Van's Armenian populace. Though Cevdet would swiftly resort to extreme measures to deal with this supposed rebellion, not all sources agree that he arrived in the province with a preconceived plan to commit genocide; what is widely agreed upon is that his methods left the Van Armenians little choice but to respond with armed resistance.

One of Cevdet's first acts was to demand of the Van Armenians that they supply 4,000 able-bodied men for work battalions, but the Armenian leadership, fearful of Cevdet's intentions, offered 500 men and payment of the standard exemption fee for the rest, which Cevdet rejected. On 16 April, Cevdet had a community leader in the town of Shadakh arrested, but the townspeople, acting on a rumour of his impending murder, surrounded the police station demanding his release. Ussher states in his memoir that Cevdet then invited a small group of Armenian leaders to visit Shadakh on a peace mission, but had them assassinated en route. At this point, Ussher himself, who had known Cevdet Bey since childhood, paid a visit to the vali in the hope of defusing tensions. Ussher recounts his meeting with Cevdet as follows:

While I was in his office the colonel of the Vali's Regiment, which he called his Kasab Tabouri, or Butcher Regiment, composed of Turkish convicts, entered and said, "You sent for me." "Yes," replied Jevdet; "go to Shadakh and wipe out its people." And turning to me he said savagely, "I won't leave one, not one so high", holding his hand below the height of his knee."

Ussher later suggests that this exchange was an intentional deception, as the regiment in question did not attack Shadakh but was instead diverted to a valley where they "destroyed six villages containing nothing but old men, women and children"; other sources however suggest that the diversion was simply due to the indiscipline of the unit. Ussher himself later treated the survivors of this attack: "[The irregulars] were mounted, armed with daggers, automatic pistols, and modern repeating rifles ... they would gallop into a crowd of fleeing women and children, draw their daggers, and rip up the unfortunate creatures. I forbear to describe the wounds brought to me for repair."

After this, Cevdet again demanded that 4,000 Armenian men "give themselves up to the military", releasing a couple of Armenian leaders as a goodwill gesture, but the Armenians, by now convinced of Cevdet's hostile intentions, delayed giving a reply. Meanwhile, Ussher and the Italian Consular Agent, Signor Sbordini, continued negotiating with Cevdet, attempting to persuade him that his actions were inflaming rather than calming the situation, but Cevdet had by this time chosen another course. On 19 April, he had a secret order issued to his forces in the vilayet:

The Armenians must be exterminated. If any Muslim protect a Christian, first, his house shall be burned; then the Christian killed before his eyes, and then his [the Moslem's] family and himself.

Ussher reports that on the following day, Monday 20 April, units under Cevdet's command attacked Armenian villages throughout the vilayet. At Arjish, the second largest town, the commander assembled the town's leaders and its 2,500 men and had them marched to a nearby river where they were slain "in groups of fifty", after which "the women and children and property were divided among the Turks". The village of Shadakh, previously mentioned, proved "unconquerable", and another, Moks, was effectively protected by a Kurdish chief, but while some other villages were able to mount a degree of resistance, most had no means of doing so; Ussher estimates that some 55,000 Armenians were consequently slaughtered during Cevdet Bey's "reign of terror".

=== Defense of Van in 1915 ===
Armenian resistance in Van

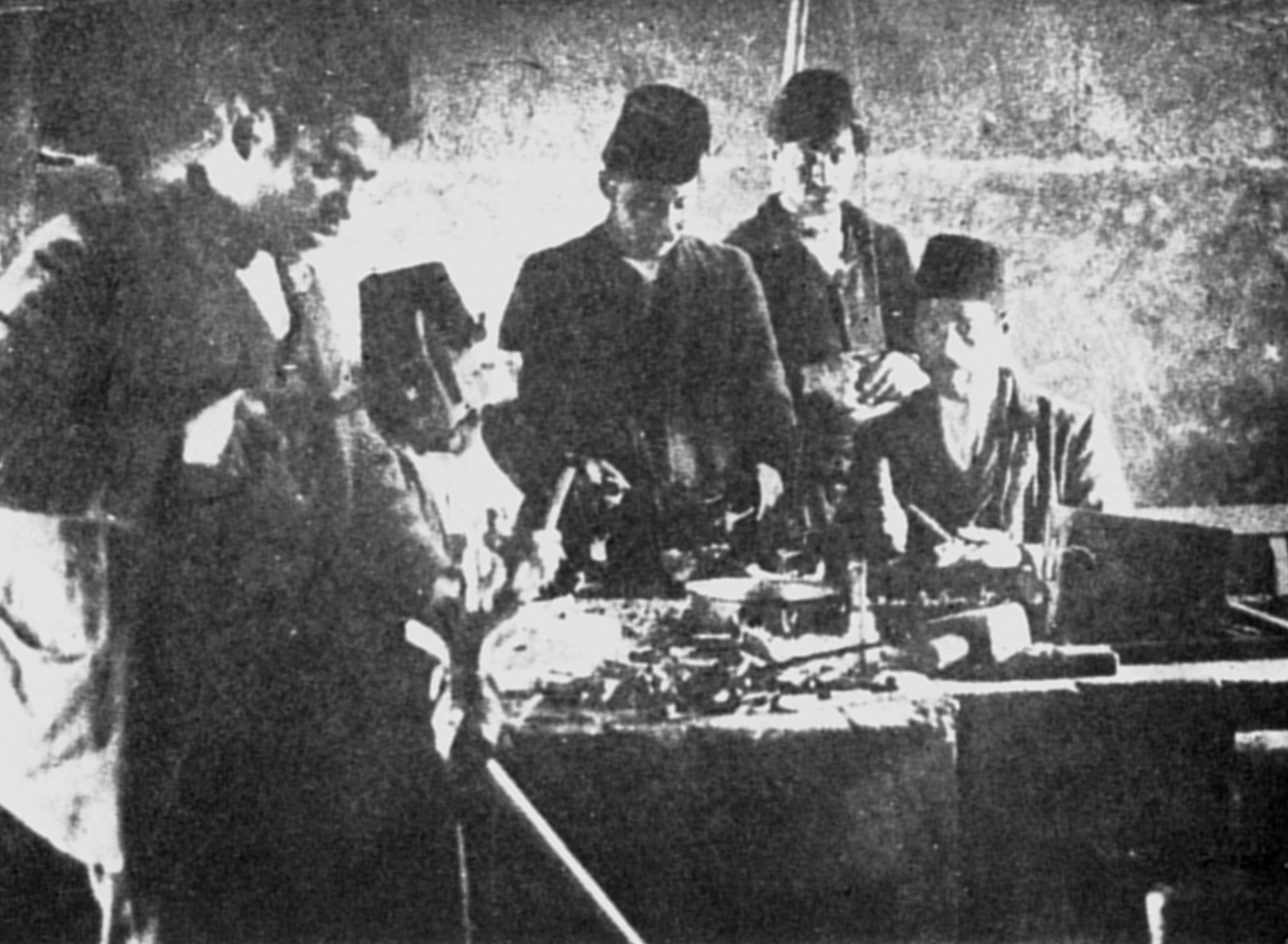
Making cartridges by hand during the defense.

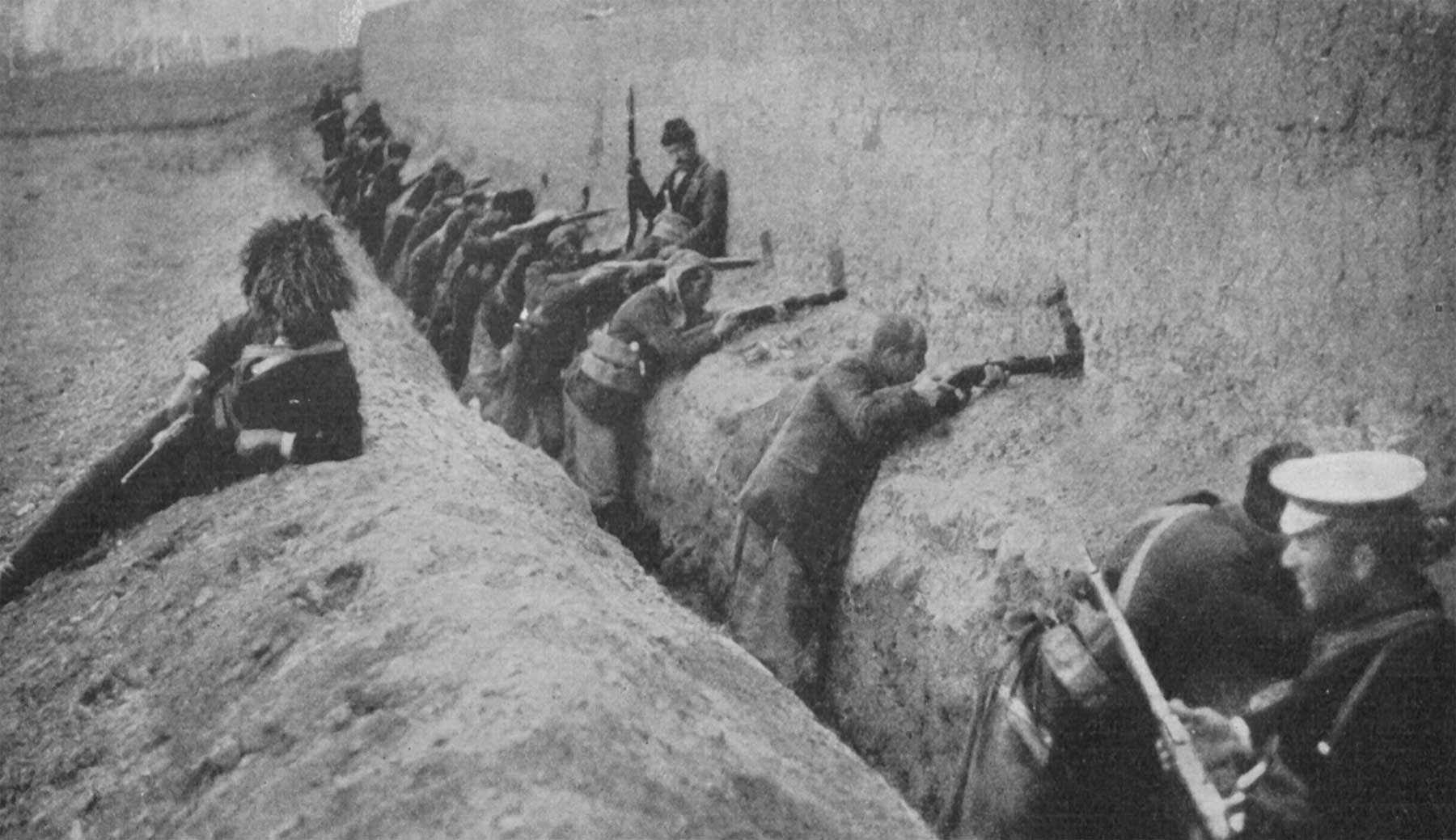
Defending the trenches below the mission compound.

While Cevdet Bey was able to quickly conquer most of the smaller Armenian population centres, the vilayet's largest city, Van, and several other localities, proved a different proposition. Ussher was at this time still stationed in the American hospital in Van and was able to give a firsthand account of the defence of the city.

Ussher states that the Armenians had long planned for a resistance, but those plans had been disrupted by the Turkish general mobilization order of 1914, which deprived Van of many of its able-bodied men, and by the discovery and confiscation of many of its hidden caches of ammunition and weapons. According to Ussher, the city was left by the time of the siege with only 300 men armed with modern rifles, plus another 1,000 armed with pistols and "antique weapons"; this force would however prove sufficient to keep Cevdet's much larger and better equipped force at bay for several weeks. Ammunition was also a constant problem for the defenders, but the city's metalworkers were able to manufacture about 2000 rounds of small-arms ammunition a day, from scrap metal and Turkish shrapnel, for the duration of the siege.

The attack on Van began with a small skirmish on 20 April, which quickly developed into "a general fusillade" and artillery barrage by the Turks. This was followed by a charge of Turkish infantry accompanied by a "Turkish mob" which was readily repulsed with small arms fire. After this, Turkish forces burned the houses of the Armenian districts that had been left outside the Armenian defensive perimeter, and settled in for a siege.

The Armenians over the course of time developed interior routes between houses, and reinforced walls to resist Turkish bombardments. The lines between the opposing forces were frequently no further apart than the opposite sides of a street, and Armenian boys would sometimes be employed in throwing smoke bombs to force the Turks out of their positions. Ussher reports that both sides attempted to tunnel beneath the enemy's defences, but the Armenians alone were successful in these endeavours, by which means they destroyed several Turkish strongholds, including the police station, a military barracks, and the British Consulate.

On 25 April, a group of several hundred Armenian refugees were able to enter the city through the road to Shushantz, kept open by Armenian fighters; later Cevdet Bey began to deliberately send refugees to the city in the hope of exhausting the city's food supply; in all, about 15,000 refugees, mostly women and children, were to arrive during the siege. Some of these needed urgent medical treatment, which Ussher himself supplied. Later, Cevdet employed some of his forces to take Shushantz and some of the other outlying villages which up until then had resisted capture; Ussher states that "from our window we could plainly see Shushantz afire on its mountain-top and Varak Monastery, with its priceless store of ancient manuscripts, going up in smoke."

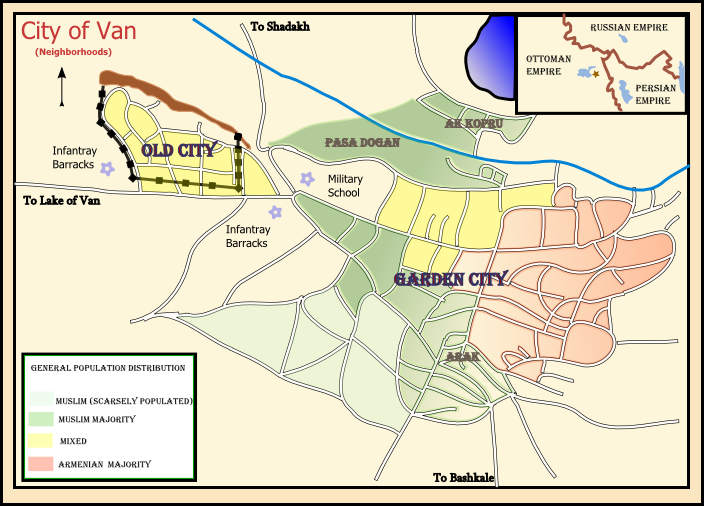
City of Van and its neighborhoods. The "Garden City" or Aikesdan in Armenian was the Armenian quarter which was besieged by Turkish troops during the siege.

By mid-May, the defenders were becoming concerned about their dwindling food supply; on 14 May, however, the Turkish forces unexpectedly retreated. One of Cevdet's last acts before the retreat was to order the shelling of the American compound, a violation of diplomatic immunity that Ussher suggests was made from Cevdet's conviction that the Americans had aided the city's defence. The cause of Cevdet's retreat became evident on 18 May, when elements of a Russo-Armenian regiment arrived, the vanguard of the Russian Army which arrived some hours later.

In reoccupying the outlying districts of Van, the defenders discovered "many ... with their throats cut, and wells filled with mutilated bodies"—those Armenians who had been unable to retreat to the defensive perimeter at the onset of the siege. It also became apparent that Cevdet's forces had slaughtered all their Armenian and Russian prisoners before retreating. Armenian fighters now sought revenge, killing every Turk in the city they could find, other than the women and children. Of this period, Ussher states:

[The Armenians] burned and murdered; the spirit of loot took possession of them, driving out every other thought. Work, everything else, was neglected. The leaders closed their eyes to what was going on. Our protests were in vain for two or three days—until the first madness passed. We remembered what they had had to endure from the Turk all their lives. Much of this loot was only recovered plunder. And many would not injure a Moslem and restrained others, because, they said, "We are Christians."

Though Cevdet Bey's own forces had been brutal in their treatment of Armenians, Ussher notes that many Armenians were saved during Cevdet's occupation by their Kurdish neighbours, who hid them at great risk to themselves and their own families.

=== Aftermath ===
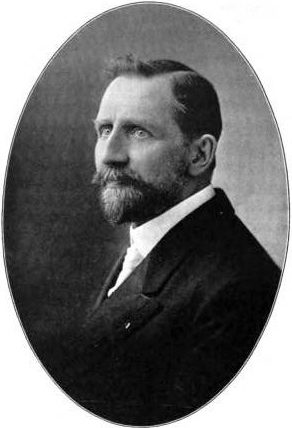
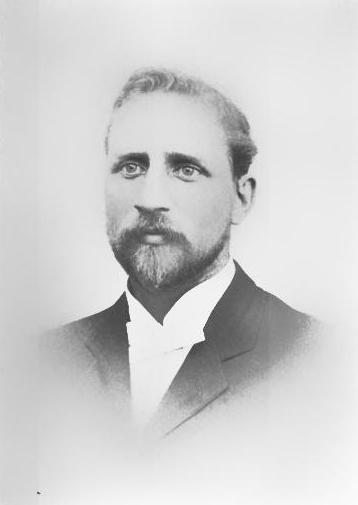
Clarence Ussher is often known as a "missionary hero."

With the siege lifted, and the Russians continuing their advance, the Armenians of Van were "for the first time in 700 years" in a position to govern themselves, and the Armenian Provisional Government was briefly formed. In June, a typhus epidemic swept the city, and both Ussher and his wife Elizabeth fell ill; Elizabeth succumbed to the disease on 14 July and was buried the next day in the city.

Ussher himself remained ill for many weeks, during which time the Russian forces in Turkey suffered reverses and were ordered to retreat, abandoning Van once again to the advancing Turks. Thousands of Armenians fled the city rather than fall once more into Turkish hands, fleeing across the border to the relative safety of the Russian Caucasus. Ussher and the other Americans—about 14 in number—also decided to flee; as Ussher was still much too ill to walk, he was placed on a litter suspended between two horses. Near Pergri, while passing through a narrow gorge, the refugee column came under fire from Turkish and Kurdish forces above; Ussher states that the bones of about 7,000 victims of the fusillade were later found in the gorge. Nonetheless, more than 270,000 refugees were able to make their escape over the border during this period.

In his memoir, Ussher reflected on responsibility for the genocide:

It is the Turkish Government, not the Turkish people, that has done all this. The Government has tried to deceive its Mohammedan subjects and arouse their hatred against the Christians. Jevdet Bey reported the Van Armenians as in rebellion. The fifty-five thousand slaughtered Armenians in that province were reported as fifty-five thousand Muslims massacred by Christians. He described in revolting detail actual atrocities – women and children, ranging from six years to eighty, outraged and mutilated to death – but made one diabolical change in his description: he said these women were Moslems thus treated by Christians. Yet few of the Turks were deceived. They distrusted their government. Eighty out of a hundred of them were opposed to the massacres and deportations, and in some places presented petitions of protest, stating that the Armenians were useful and loyal citizens and that it would be an injury to the country to send them away. Some valis resigned their positions rather than carry out the orders of Enver and Talaat, who were inexorable.

== Later life ==
To the memory of my beloved wife and the other martyrs, American and Armenian, who have laid down their lives for the name of Christ in Turkey during the Great World War.

— Clarence Ussher in the introduction of An American Physician in Turkey: A Narrative of Adventures in Peace and in War

After the war, Ussher made plans to have the deported Armenian refugees return to their homes. In 1919 he traveled to Constantinople to gain support for his plans from the Ottoman government; he also insisted that the crimes perpetrated by the previous government be accounted for. Ussher then returned to the United States, where he tried to gain support from the Near East Foundation. However, his efforts failed with the establishment of the Republic of Turkey in 1923. He served in Erivan Armenia from 1919 to 1923 as Near East Relief chief. (See "Near East Relief" publication Vol. III, No. 23, June 11, 1921) Ussher eventually settled in Santa Monica, California. On September 20, 1955, he died at the age of 85. He had three sons; Richard, Sidney, and Neville, and a daughter, Eleanor.

== Works ==
Ussher was the author of many works, including:

- An American Physician in Turkey: A Narrative of Adventures in Peace and in War. Houghton Mifflin Company. 1917. "gbs_similarbooks." (with Grace H. Knapp)
- Before Governors and Kings. Houghton Mifflin Company. 1917. (24 pp.)
- Sir Ahmed. Faithful Words Publishing Company. 1940. (12 pp.)
- Ussher, Clarence Douglas (1952). True Experiences of a Missionary Summer in Wyoming – 1893. (16 pp.)

== Ararat ==
Bruce Greenwood's role in the drama film Ararat was influenced by Clarence Ussher's eyewitness accounts during the defense of Van in 1915.

== See also ==
- Armenian genocide
- Witnesses and testimonies of the Armenian genocide
- Defense of Van (1915)

== Bibliography ==
- Akçam, Taner (2012). The Young Turks' Crime Against Humanity: The Armenian Genocide and Ethnic Cleansing in the Ottoman Empire. Princeton, New Jersey: Princeton University Press. pp. xv-xix. ISBN 9780691153339.
- Balakian, Peter (2009). The Burning Tigris. HarperCollins. ISBN 978-0061860171.
- Bloxham, Donald (2005). The Great Game of Genocide: Imperialism, Nationalism, and the Destruction of the Ottoman Armenians. Oxford University Press. ISBN 9780191500442.
- Kévorkian, Raymond H. (2011). The Armenian genocide: a complete history (Reprinted. ed.). London: I. B. Tauris. ISBN 978-1-84885-561-8.
- Lieberman, Benjamin (2013). The Holocaust and Genocides in Europe. A&C Black. pp. 51–56. ISBN 9781441194787.
- Ussher, Clarence D. (1917). An American Physician in Turkey: A Narrative of Adventures in Peace and War. Boston and New York: Houghton Mifflin Company.
