= New York State Commission of Correction =

State commission under New York State Executive Department

The New York State Commission of Correction is "empowered to visit and inspect all penal institutions and to promote humane and efficient administration of these institutions." It'is a part of the New York State Executive Department.

== History ==
It was created by the New York State Constitution and was then known as the State Commission of Prisons. It had eight commissioners appointed by the Governor of New York.
