= Artsvi Vaspurakan =

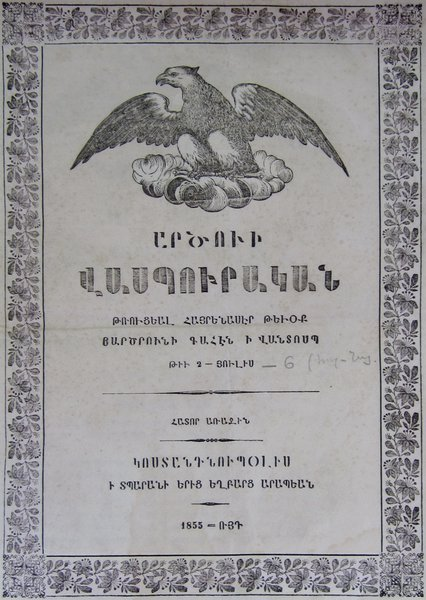
1855 publication of Artsiv Vaspurakan

Artsvi Vaspurakan (in Armenian Արծուի Վասպուրական) was an Armenian periodical. It was published monthly, then weekly, in Constantinople and Varagavank from 1855 to 1874 by Mkrtich Khrimian and M. Ananian.

It was the first periodical published in the territory of Western (Turkish) Armenia, and was dedicated to religious life, moral questions and the history of Armenia. It was a source of propaganda for the works of Mesrop Mashtots, Movses Khorenatsi and others, and supported the idea of realization of the National constitution in the territory of Western Armenia. Contributors to the periodical included Garegin Srvandztiants and Raffi.

== Sources ==
- Concise Armenian Encyclopedia, Ed. by acad. K. Khudaverdyan, Yerevan, 1990, Vol. 1, p. 362.
