= Varagavank =

Armenian monastery in Turkey

- Վարագավանք
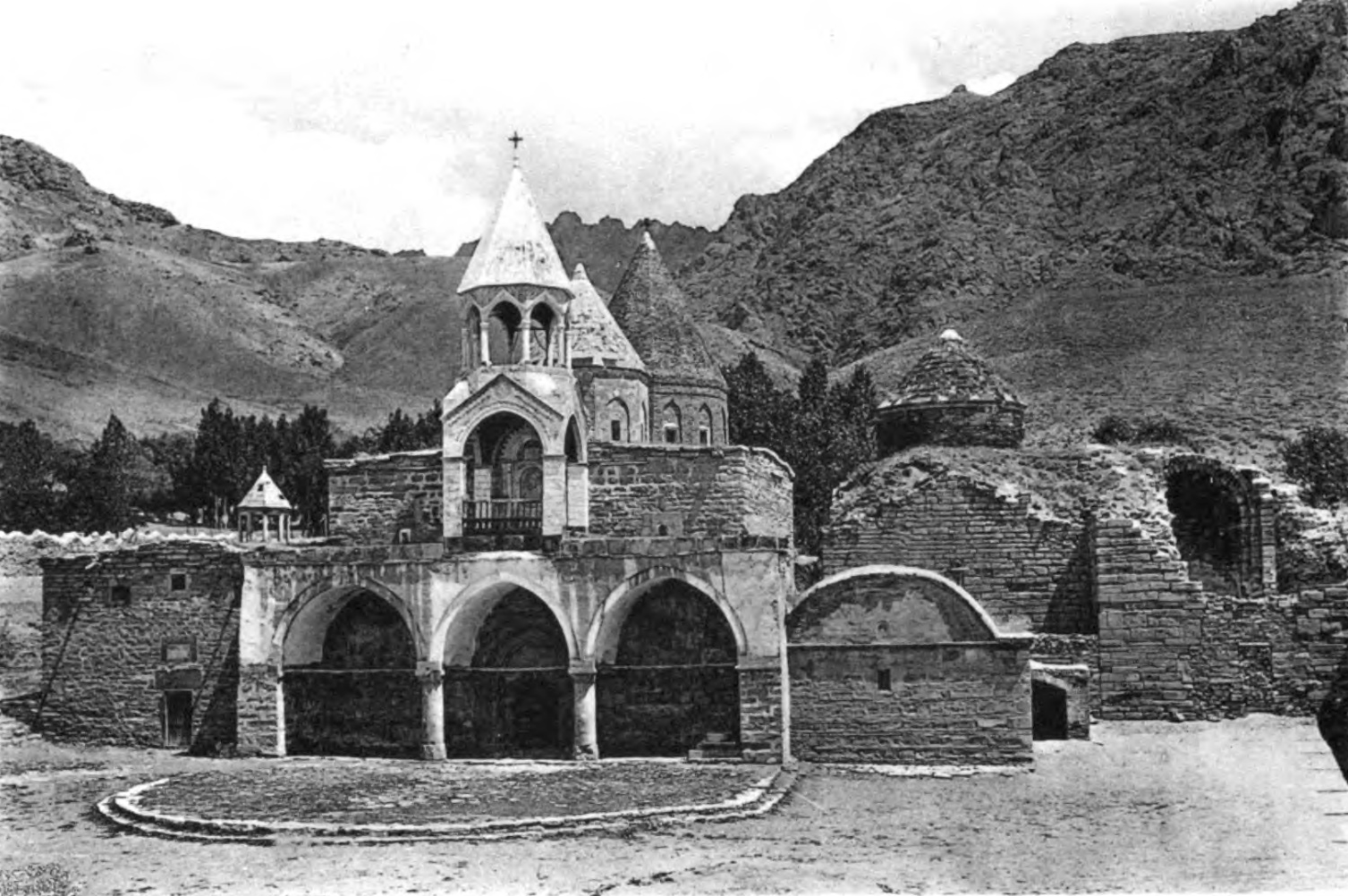
- The monastery c. 1913

- Location within Turkey

Religion
- Affiliation: Armenian Apostolic Church
- Status: several buildings destroyed, continuous deterioration of others

Location
- Location: Yukarı Bakraçlı, Van Province, Turkey
- Interactive map of Varagavank
- Coordinates: 38.449636°N 43.460825°E

Architecture
- Style: Armenian
- Founder: Senekerim-Hovhannes Artsruni
- Groundbreaking: early 11th century

Varagavank (Armenian: Վարագավանք, 'Monastery of Varag'; (Note: Sometimes spelled separately as two words: Varaga vank, Վարագայ վանք in classical spelling and Վարագա վանք in reformed spelling. Pronounced Varakavank' in Western Armenian.) Turkish: Yedi Kilise, 'Seven Churches') was an Armenian monastery on the slopes of Mount Erek (Varag), 9 km (5.6 mi) southeast of the city of Van, in eastern Turkey.

The monastery was founded in the early 11th century by Senekerim-Hovhannes Artsruni, the Armenian King of Vaspurakan, on a preexisting religious site. Initially serving as the necropolis of the Artsruni kings, it eventually became the seat of the archbishop of the Armenian Church in Van. The monastery has been described as one of the great monastic centers of the Armenian church by Ara Sarafian and the richest and most celebrated monastery of the Lake Van area by Robert H. Hewsen.

During the Armenian genocide, in April–May 1915, the Turkish army attacked, burned, and destroyed much of the monastery. More of it was destroyed in the 1960s, although some sections are still extant.

== History ==
Before Christianity, the site had a significant religious importance during the Urartian period as attested by the presence of inscriptions dedicated to gods Ḫaldi and Teišeba and later housed a sanctuary of Vahagn, the Zoroastrian Verethragna, whose name may have been the source of the name Varag.

=== Origins ===
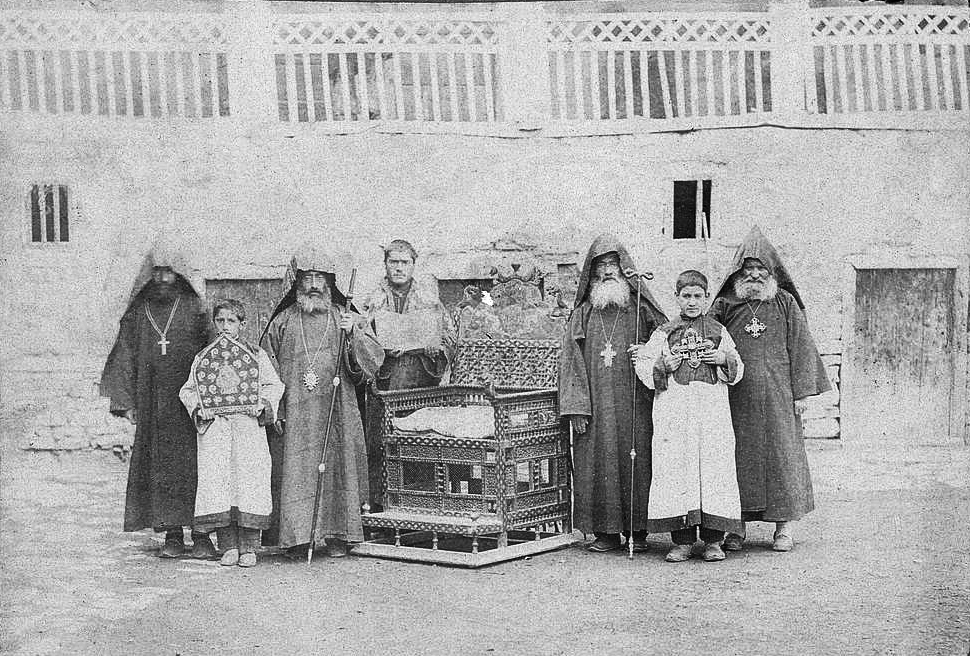
Armenian monks and boys with the throne of King Senekerim-Hovhannes at Varagavank (c. 1880–1892)

According to tradition, in the late third century, the Roman virgin Hripsime, fleeing the Diocletianic Persecution, hid the remnant of the True Cross she wore on her neck at the site of the monastery. In 653, when the location was discovered, Catholicos Nerses III the Builder built the Church of Surb Nshan (Holy Sign), described by Robert H. Hewsen as "a simple hermitage". Nerses also established the Feast of the Holy Cross of Varag (Varaga surb khachi ton), celebrated by the Armenian Apostolic Church on the Sunday nearest to 28 September, always two weeks after the Feast of the Cross.

Queen Khushush, the daughter of King Gagik I of Armenia and spouse of Senekerim-Hovhannes Artsruni, the future Artsruni King of Vaspurakan, built a church at the site in 981 dedicated to the Holy Wisdom (Surb Sopi). In the late medieval period, it was converted into a castle and was known as Berdavor (berd meaning 'fortress' in Armenian). The Church of Surb Hovhannes (Saint John) was built to the north in the 10th century.

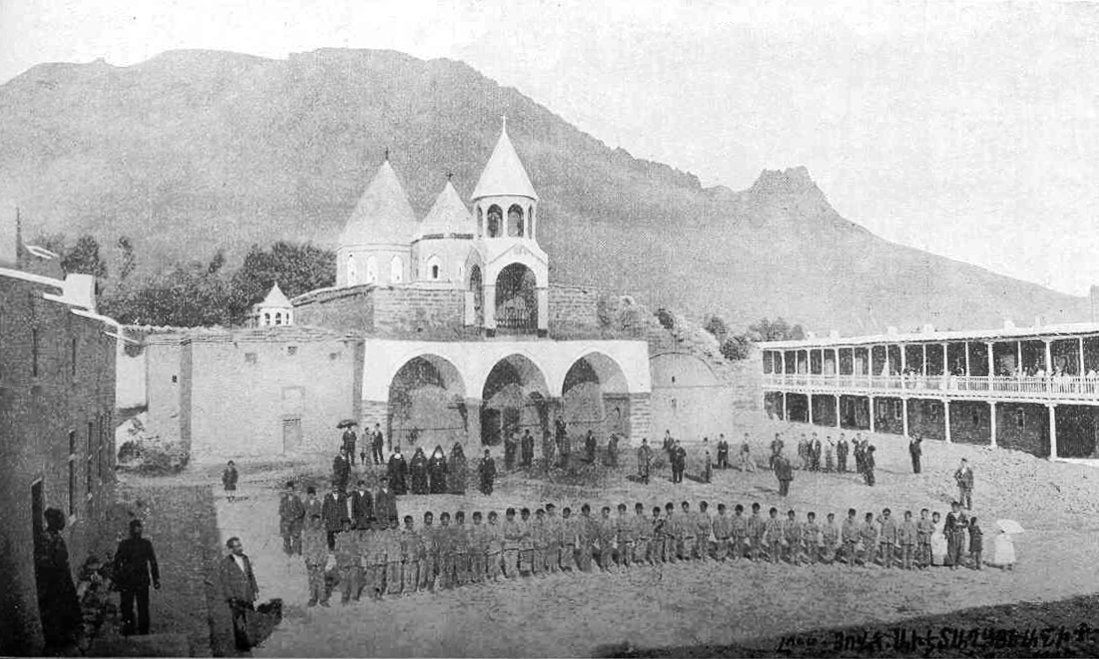
View of the monastery

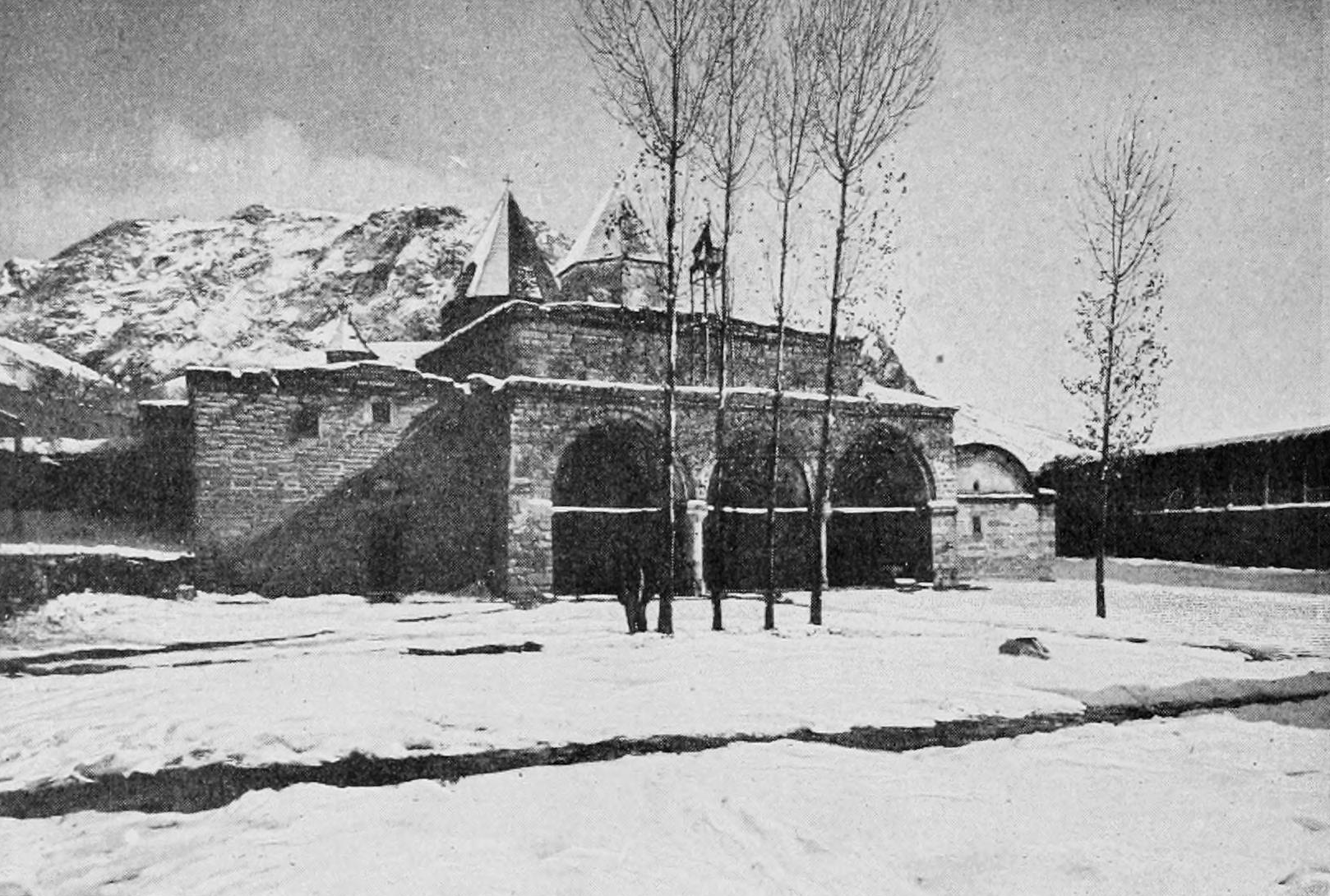
View of the monastery in 1893

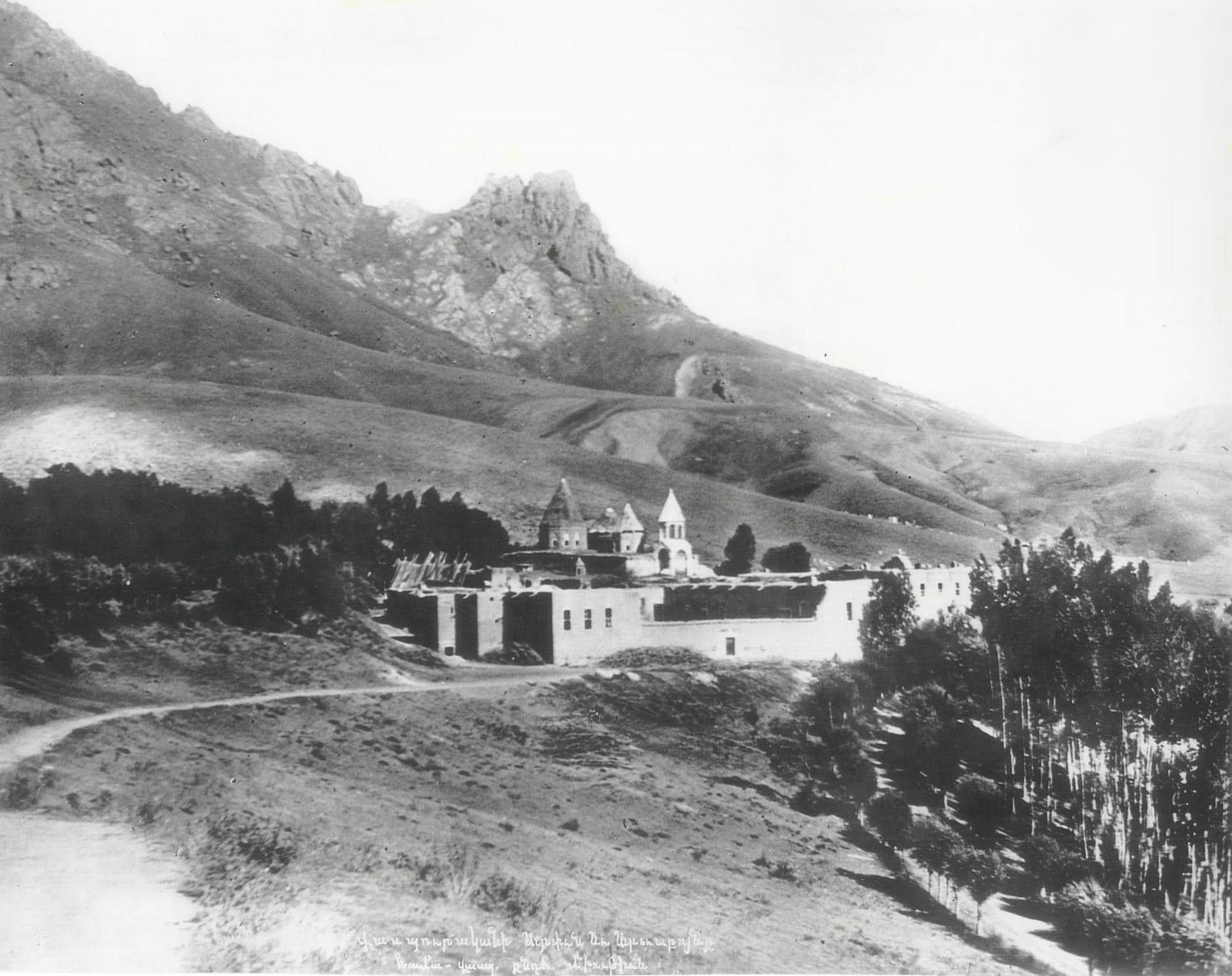
View of the monastery from afar

=== Foundation and medieval period ===
The monastery itself was founded by Senekerim-Hovhannes early in his reign (1003–24) to house a relic of the True Cross that had been kept on the site since Hripsime. In 1021, when Vaspurakan was annexed by the Byzantine Empire, Senekerim-Hovhannes took the relic to Sebastia, where the following year his son Atom founded the Surb Nshan Monastery. In 1025, following his death, Senekerim-Hovhannes was buried at Varagavank and the True Cross was returned to the monastery. Fearing an attack by Muslims, Father Ghukas of Varagavank took the True Cross in 1237 to the Tavush region of northeastern Armenia. There he settled in the Anapat monastery, which was renamed Nor Varagavank. In 1318, the Mongols invaded the region and ransacked the monastery. All the churches were destroyed except St. Hovhannes, which had an iron door and was where the monks hid. Between 1320 and the 1350s, the monastery was completely restored.

=== Modern period ===
The Safavid emperor Tahmasp I ransacked the monastery in 1534. In 1648, along with other buildings in the region, Varagavank was destroyed by an earthquake. Its restoration was begun immediately thereafter by monastery father Kirakos who found financial support among the wealthy merchants in Van. According to the 17th-century historian Arakel of Tabriz, four churches were restored and renovated.

The architect Tiratur built a square-planned gavit (narthex) west of Church of Surb Astvatsatsin (Holy Mother of God) in 1648. It functioned as a church during the 19th century, called Surb Gevorg. To the west of the narthex was a 17th-century three-arched open-air porch; to the north was Church of Surb Khach (Holy Cross); while to the south was the 17th-century Church of Surb Sion. Urartian cuneiform inscriptions were used as lintels on their western entrances.

Suleyman, the prince of Hoşap Castle, invaded the monastery in 1651, looting its Holy Cross, manuscripts, and treasures. The cross was later repurchased, and it was taken to the Tiramayr Church of Van in 1655. The monastery declined in the late 17th century and, in 1679, many of its treasures were sold due to economic difficulties. Archbishop Bardughimeos Shushanetsi renovated the monastery in 1724.

In 1779, father Baghdasar vardapet decorated the narthex walls with frescoes of King Abgar V, Theodosius I, Saint Gayane, Hripsime, Khosrovidukht, and Gabriel. According to Murad Hasratyan, the unknown painter had fused together the styles of Armenian, Persian, and Western European art.

==== 19th century ====
A wall was built around the monastery in 1803 and, fourteen years later, the Church of Surb Khach (Holy Cross) was completely renovated and converted into a depository of manuscripts by archbishop Galust. In 1832, Tamur Pasha of Van robbed the monastery's treasures and strangled the father Mktrich vardapet Gaghatatsi to death. In 1849, Gabriel vardapet Shiroyan restored the Church of Sion, which had been destroyed by an earthquake, and converted it into a wheat warehouse.

Mkrtich Khrimian, the future head of the Armenian Church, became father of Varagavank in 1857 and made the monastery effectively independent and subordinate only to the Armenian Patriarchate of Constantinople. He founded a printing house and began publishing Artsvi Vaspurakan (Eagle of Vaspurakan), the first newspaper in historical Armenia, which was published between 1858 and 1864. He also established a modern school. The school taught subjects such as theology, music, grammar, geography, Armenian studies and history; the prominent novelist Raffi was briefly one of the teachers. The school produced its first graduates in 1862.

During the Hamidian massacres of 1896, the monastery was sacked and robbed. Some teachers and students were killed. According to a contemporary report by an American at Van, "Varak, the most famous and historic monastery in all this [Van] region, which has weathered the storms of centuries is almost certain to go [on fire]."

=== Sacking and abandonment ===
On 20 April 1915, some 30 gendarmes arrived at Varagavank and murdered the monastery's two monks together with four of their servants. The monastery remained under their occupation until 30 April, when, for unknown reasons, the gendarmes withdrew and returned to Van city. This withdrawal coincided with the arrival on Varag mountain of some 3000 Armenian refugees from the Hayatzor valley who had escaped the massacres that had taken place there several days earlier. They were soon joined by some 3000 survivors of massacres elsewhere, and together they found a temporary refuge in the Armenian villages and monasteries on the mountain, including Varagavank. Self-defense units were also set up in an attempt to protect the villages; about 250 men, almost half the force, was stationed at Varag, with most of the remainder based at nearby Shushants monastery. On the order of Van's governor, Djevdet Bey, Turkish forces returned in strength, with 300 cavalrymen, 1000 militia, and three batteries of artillery. According to historian Raymond Kévorkian, this was on 8 May. Shushants quickly fell after putting up a feeble defense and was burnt down. Varagavank fell shortly afterwards and was also burnt. The majority of the villagers and the refugees managed to escape to Van at night. The Turkish forces made no attempt to stop them entering the Armenian-controlled sectors of the city; it is speculated that they were deliberately allowed in so that they would use up the limited food supplies of the defenders.

The exact date of the burning of the monastery is not known for certain. On 27 April 1915, a message sent "To Americans, or any Foreign Consul" by Clarence Ussher and Ernest Yarrow, American missionaries in Van, said that "From our window we could plainly see Shushantz afire on its mountain-side and Varak Monastery, with its priceless store of ancient manuscripts, going up in smoke." However, a fellow missionary, Elizabeth Barrows Ussher, Clarence Ussher's wife, wrote in her diary that the monastery was attacked by 200 cavalry and foot soldiers on 30 April, but they were repulsed. She gave 4 May as the day the monastery was burned. Another missionary teacher, Grace H. Knapp, recounted, however, that "On the 8th May we saw the place in flames, and Varak Monastery near by, with its priceless ancient manuscripts, also went up in smoke."

== Current state ==
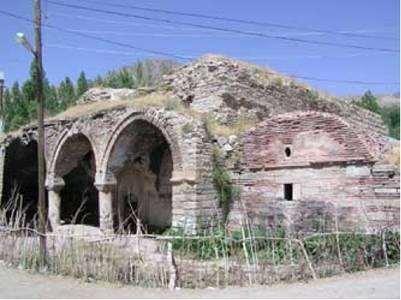
The monastery's remains in 2005

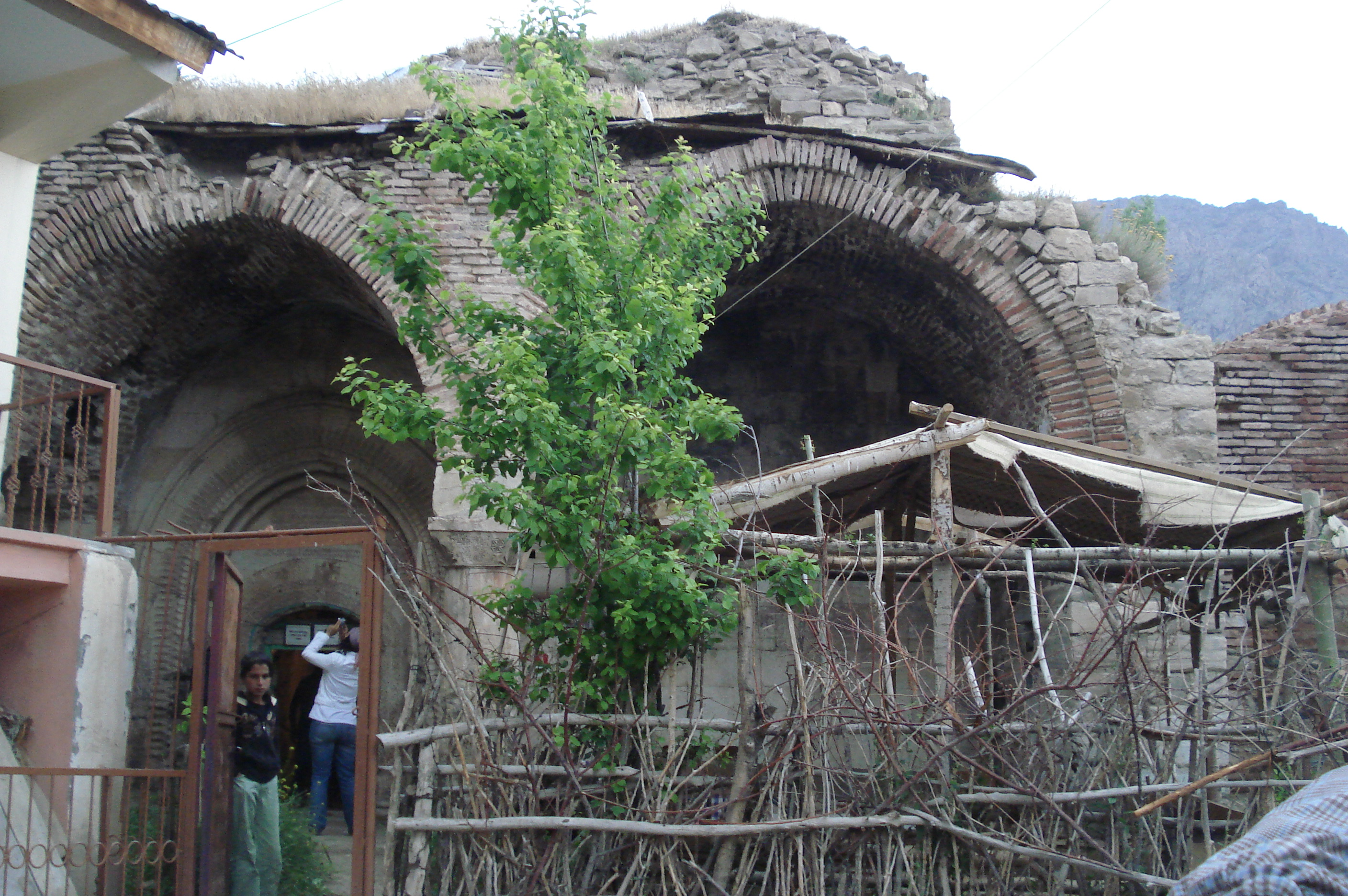
2009

A significant number of the structures surviving the 1915 destruction were destroyed in the 1960s. As of 2006, the monastery's remains were used as a barn. According to historian Ara Sarafian, as of 2012, "good sections have just barely survived until our days." Dr. Jenny B. White, a scholar on Turkey, wrote in 2013 that, on her visit, the remains of the monastery "consisted of nothing more than a few brick vaults used to house goats amid a clutch of tumbledown Kurdish homes." The best-preserved section of the monastery is the church of Surb Gevorg (St. George), which is now looked after by a caretaker. The dome is partly collapsed and contains some traces of surviving frescoes. The dome of the church of Surb Nshan is entirely gone.

The scholar Samvel Karapetyan stated in 2007 that the monastery's remain had become "a very important source of profit for the Kurdish village" who sell needlework in the chapel, while the church has been turned into a kind of art gallery. As of 2015, a century after the genocide, the site contained no signage acknowledging that it was once a celebrated church for Armenians. Historian Vahram Ter-Matevosyan suggested that its destruction is part of Turkey's cultural genocide against Armenian heritage.

=== Restoration efforts ===
In February 2010, following the renovation of the Holy Cross Cathedral at Akdamar Island in Lake Van, Halil Berk, the Deputy Governor of Van Province, announced that the Governor's Office sought to restore Varagavank and the Ktuts Monastery at Çarpanak Island. In June of that year, the governor also stated that the monastery at Çarpanak Island and Varagavank would be renovated "in the near future." In October 2010, Radikal reported that a nearby mosque, built in 1997, would be demolished to make room for the restoration of Varagavank.

The monastery was damaged as a result of the 2011 Van earthquake. According to Ara Sarafian, "parts of the main church collapsed, while other parts were significantly weakened. Old cracks got bigger, new ones appeared." Turkish engineers reportedly inspected it and announced that they would commence restoration work in the spring of 2012. Sarafian wrote that "such promises have been made in the past and one needs to be a little skeptical. The current state of the church makes such work much harder than at any time in the past." He noted in a 2012 article that the local and provincial governments supported the preservation and restoration of the monastery. In October 2012, the artist Raffi Bedrosyan, who contributed to the restoration of the St. Giragos Church in Diyarbakır, stated that he had hoped to restore Varagavank and added that "Both Ankara and Van agreed to launch the restoration project, but social and natural obstacles delayed the process.". In 2017 it was documented that the remaining stones of the monastery are regularly taken off by the local authorities to build a local mosque and other developments with them.

=== Ownership ===
Taraf reported in September 2012 that the monastery is owned by the Turkish journalist and media executive Fatih Altaylı. In an interview, Altaylı told the newspaper that the monastery belonged to his grandfather and he inherited it from his father. The monastery was confiscated during the Armenian genocide. A group of Armenians in Turkey, led by the activist Nadya Uygun, started a petition asking him to "Apply to the Armenian Patriarchate of Turkey and transfer the title deed of the church to the concerned [Armenian community] foundation." Altayli told Agos that he is ready to give it to the Armenian Patriarchate of Constantinople, but no government authority has approached him to respond to his offer to give back the church to its owners, and that they displayed no interest in cooperating. Revolutionary Socialist Workers' Party (DSİP) activists demonstrated in early October 2012 before the Habertürk headquarters in Beyoğlu, Istanbul demanding the return of the monastery land to the Armenians. As of September 2014, there was no progress.

== Architecture ==
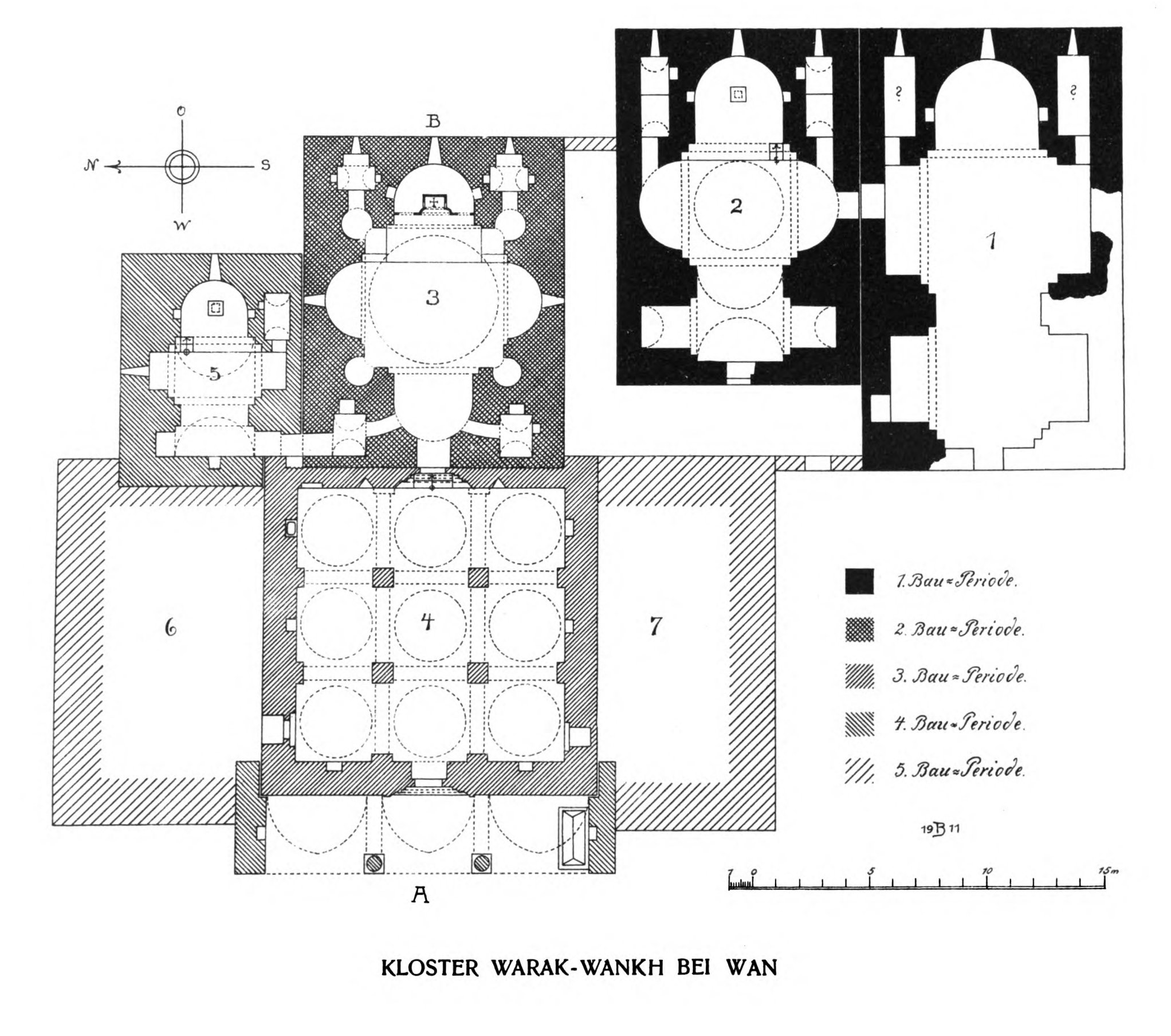
Ground plan by Bachmann. 1) Surb Sopia 2) Surb Hovhannes 3) Surb Astvatsatsin (standing) 4) Surb Gevorg (standing) 5) Surb Nshan 6) Surb Khach (standing) 7) Surb Sion (standing) 8) Zhamatun

The monastery was composed of six churches, a gavit (narthex) and other structures. The main church of Varagavank was called Surb Astvatsatsin (Holy Mother of God). It dated to the 11th century and was similar in plan to the prominent Saint Hripsime Church in Vagharshapat. The earliest structure was on the southern part of the ensemble and was known as Surb Sopia (10th century). Queen Khushush left an inscription (dated 981) on its western wall.

== Manuscripts ==
In the 10th century, Queen Mlke, the wife of Gagik I, presented the monastery with The Gospels of Queen Mlke, one of the best known Armenian illuminated manuscripts. In the 14th–16th centuries the monastery became a major center of manuscript production. A number of Varagavank manuscripts are now kept at the Matenadaran repository in Yerevan.

== Cultural references ==
Raffi mentions the monastery in volume two of the novel Sparks (Kaytser, 1883–87). The prominent poet Hovhannes Tumanyan wrote an article about the monastery in 1910, belatedly celebrating the fiftieth anniversary of Mkrtich Khrimian becoming father of Varag and the monastery's subsequent revival as a great center of education and culture.

== European visitors ==
- Austen Henry Layard (1853): "...the large Armenian convent of Yedi Klissia, or the seven churches, built of substantial stone masonry, and inclosing a spacious courtyard planted with trees. [...] The church, a substantial modern edifice, stand within the courtyard. Its walls are covered with pictyres as primitive in design as in execution."
- Henry Fanshawe Tozer (1881): "...the broken Varak Dagh formed a noble object on the further side of the plain. In one of the upper valleys of the last-named mountain lies an important monastery, which is the residence of the archbishop, and has a good school."
- H. F. B. Lynch (1893): "The monastery of Yed Kilisa, situated on the slopes of that mountain, is the most frequented of the numerous cloisters in the neighbourhood..."

== Gallery ==
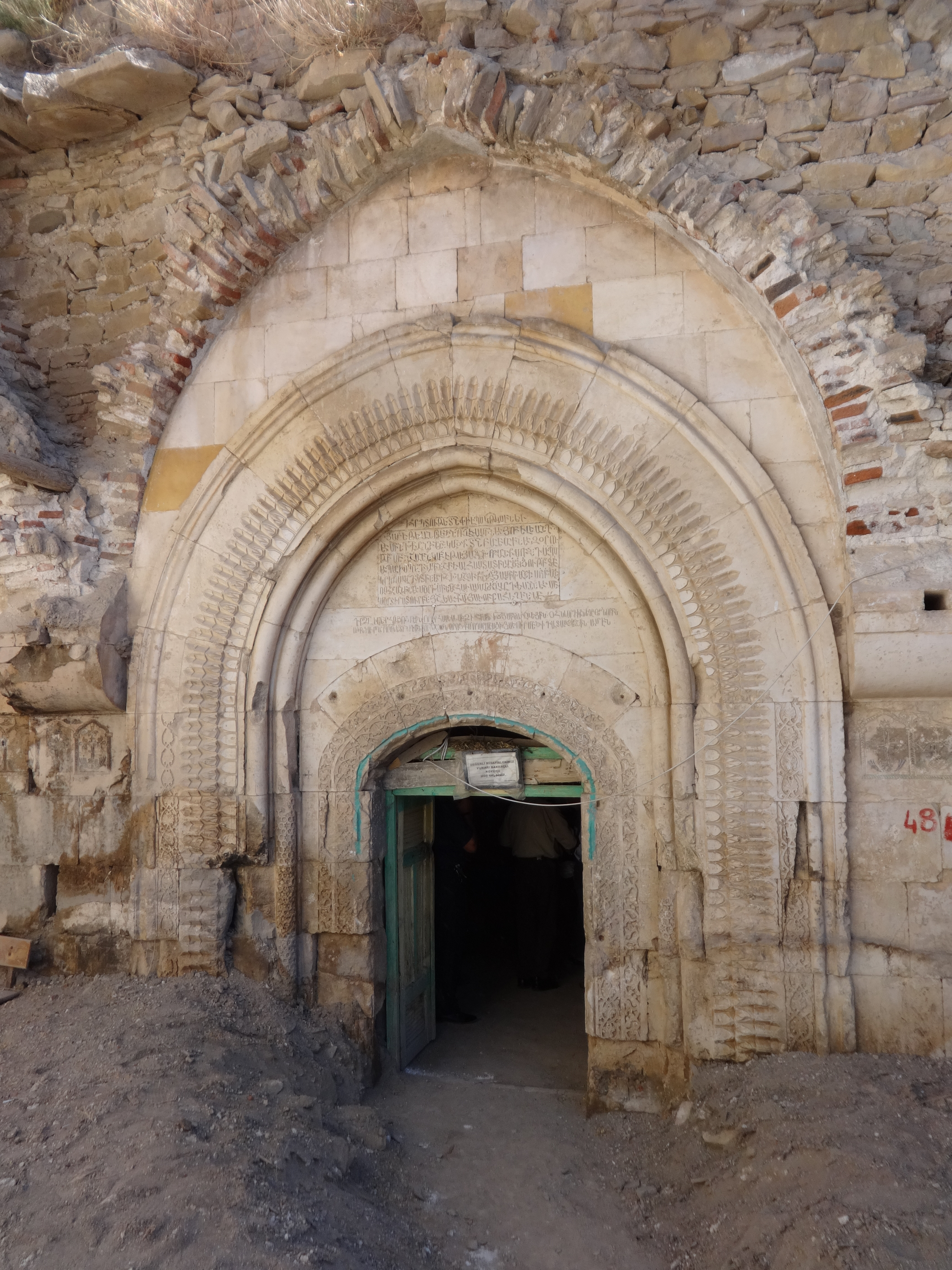
Entrance in 2013

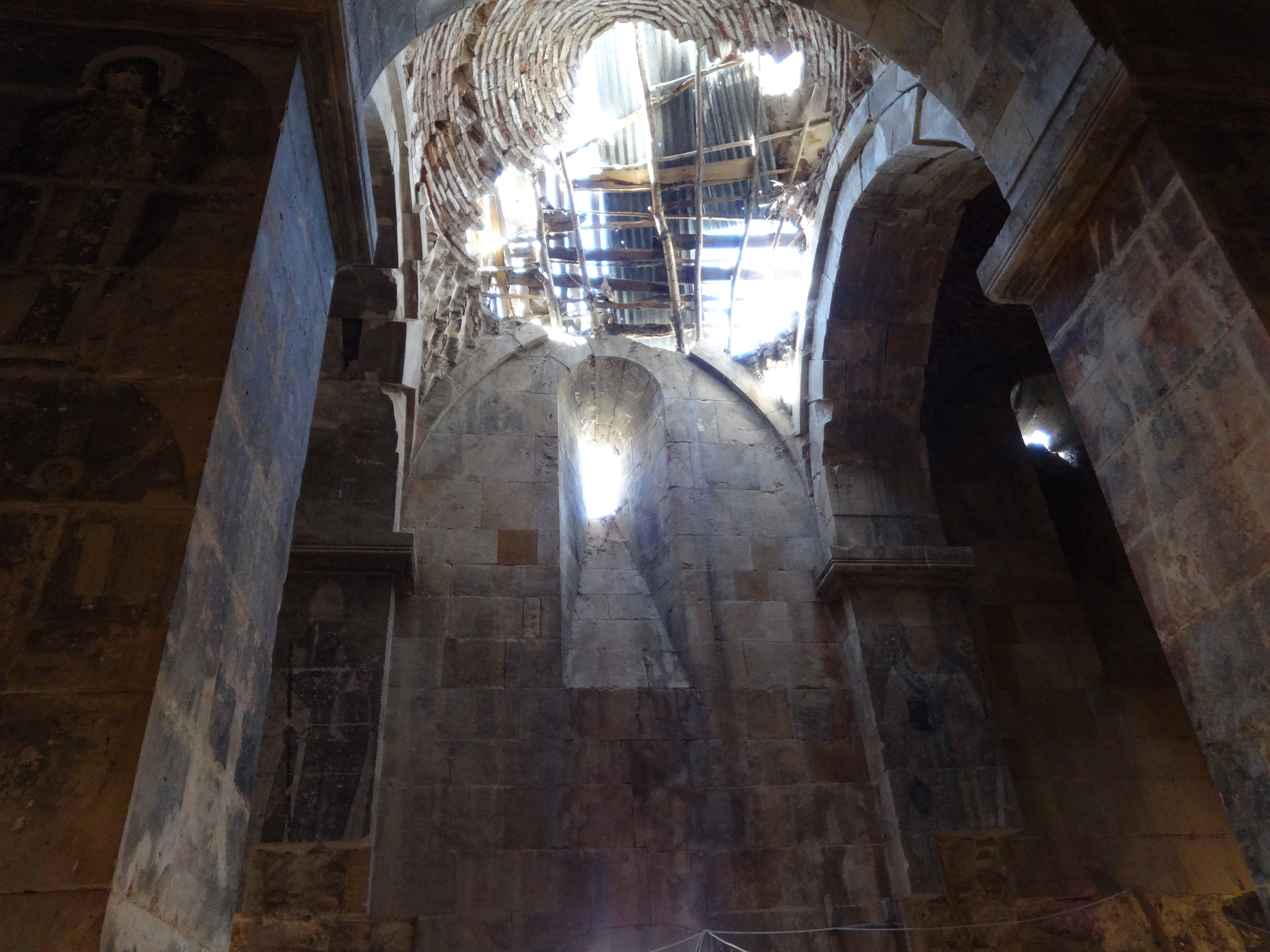
Gavit in 2013

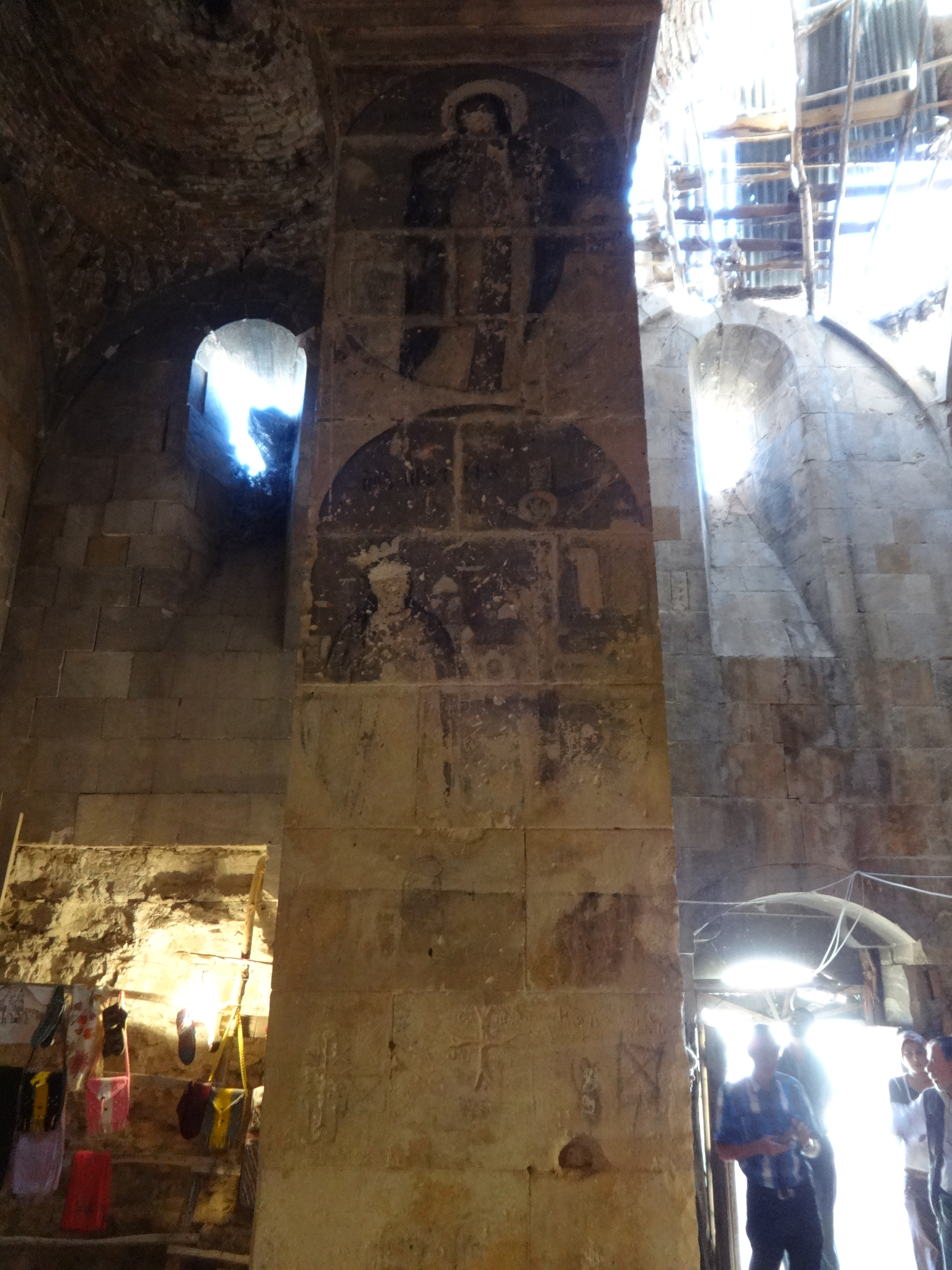

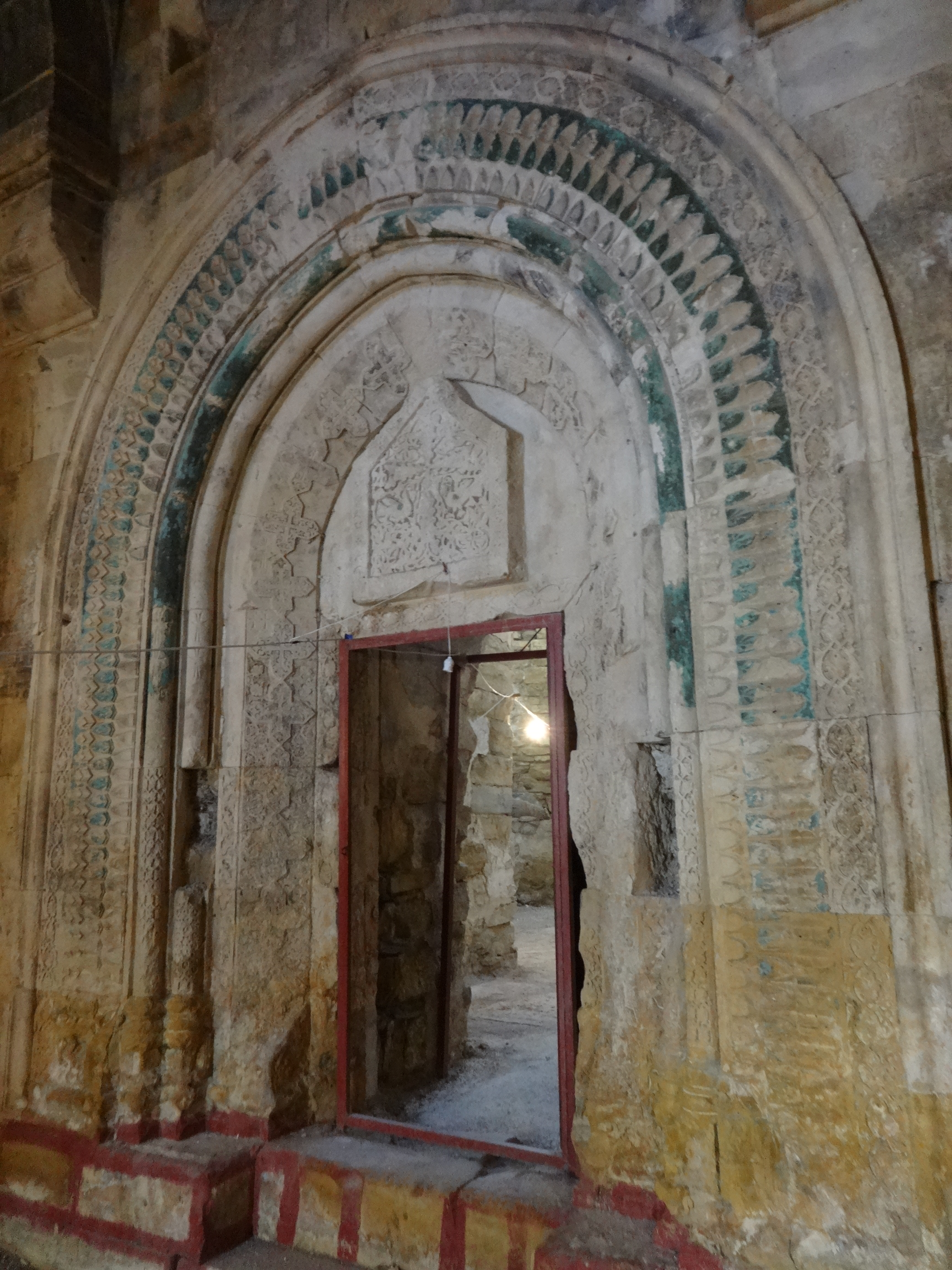

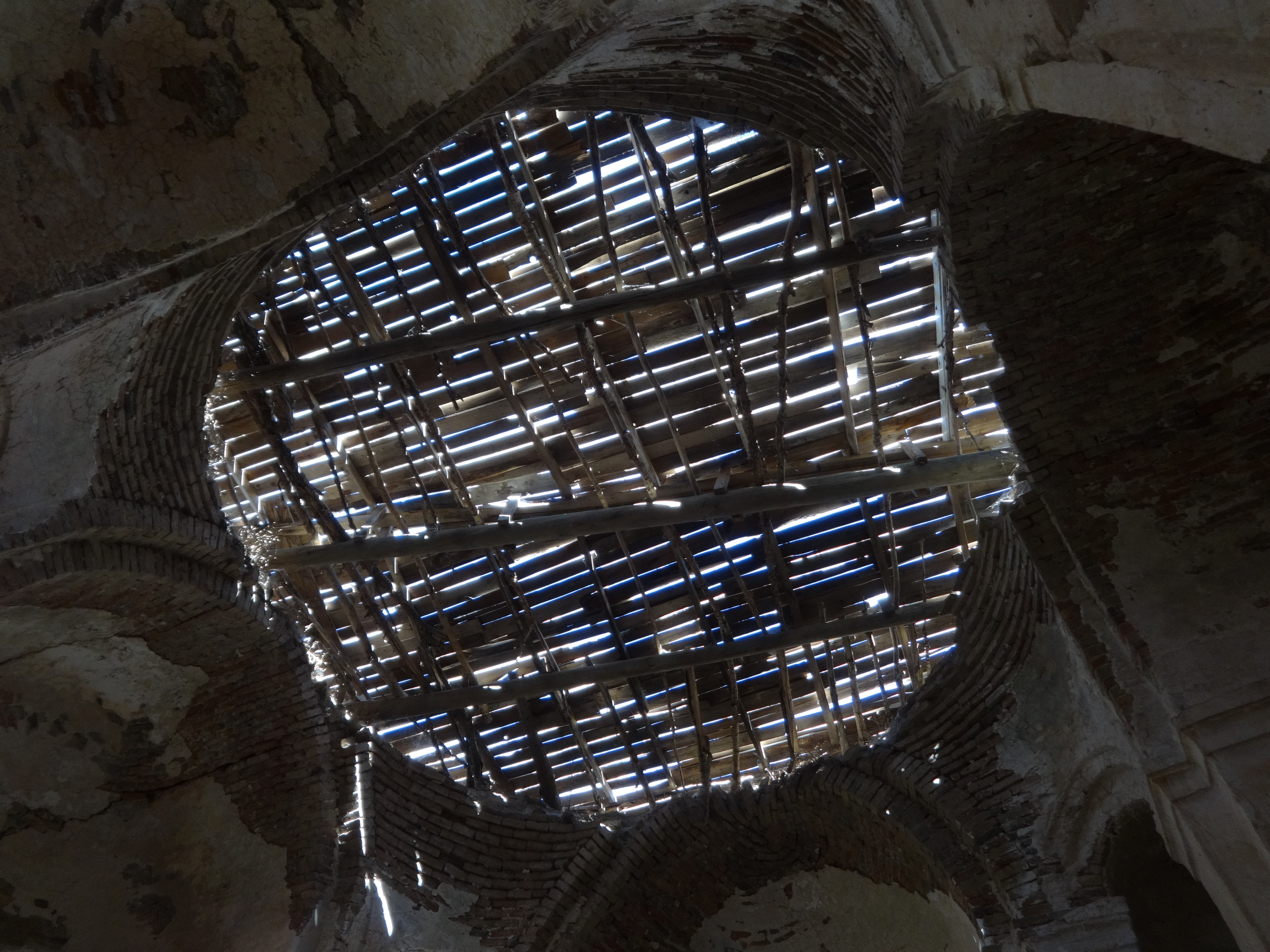
Main church in 2013

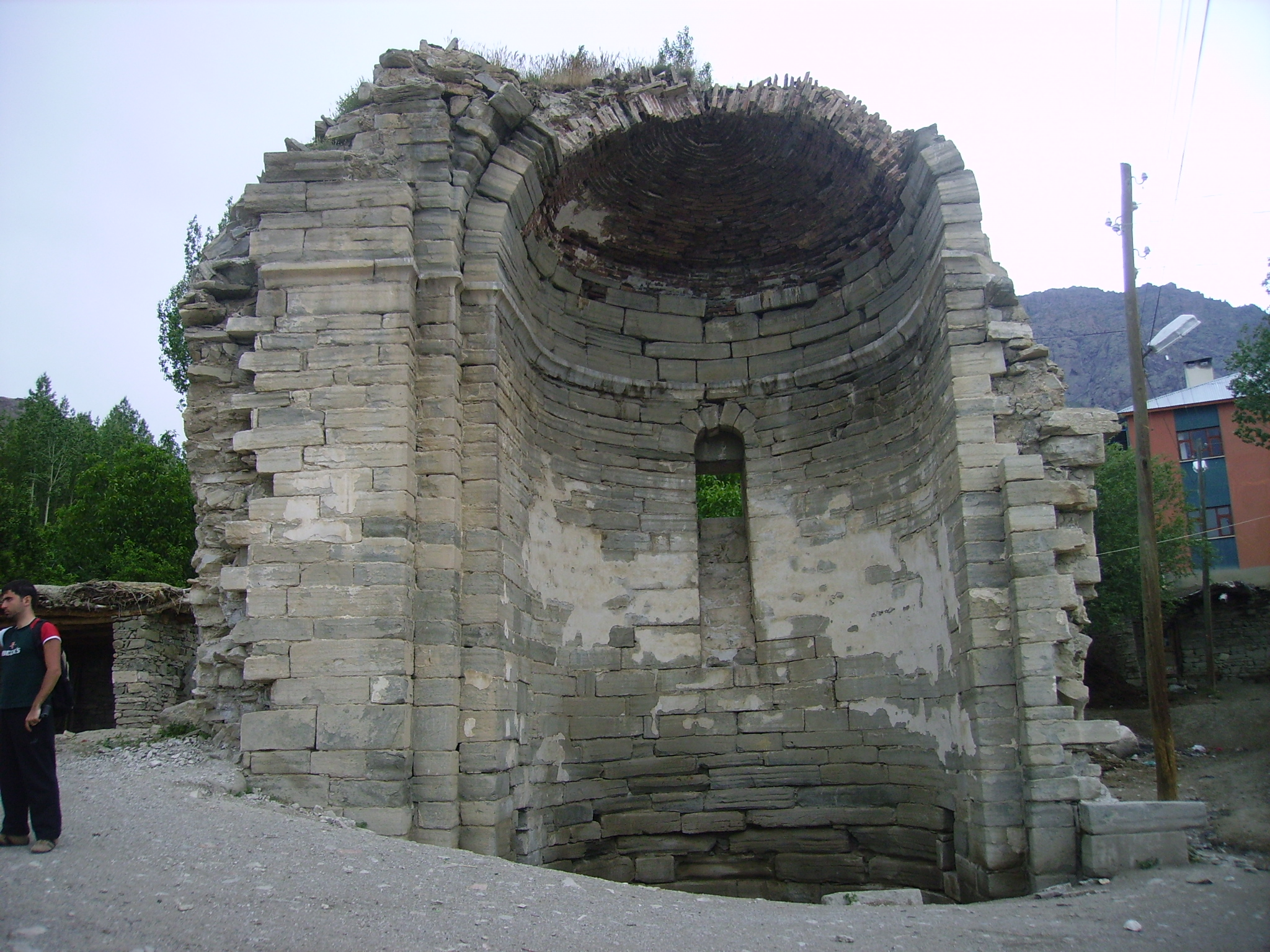
Apse from church 1, 2009

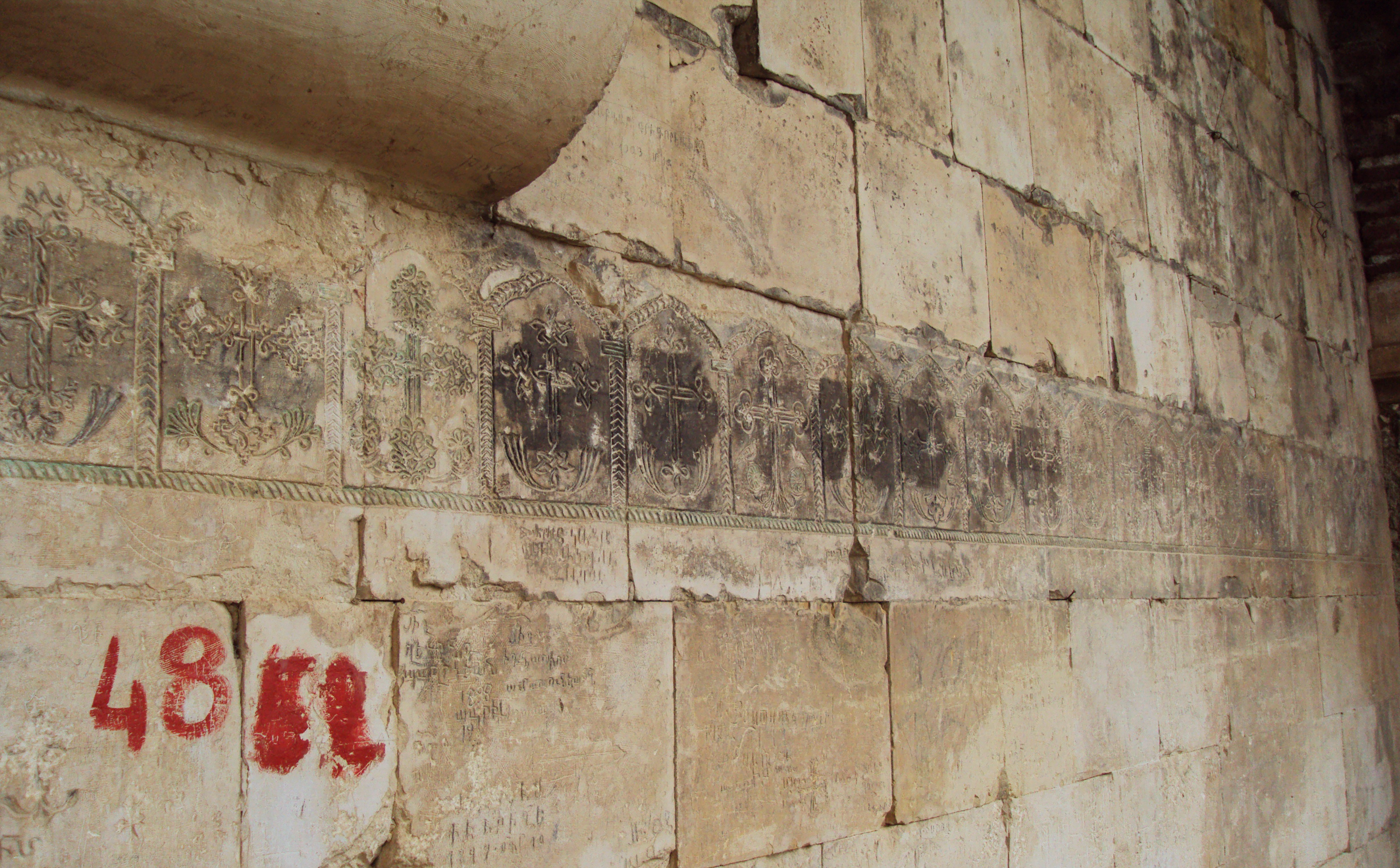
Varagavank, ornament, 2011

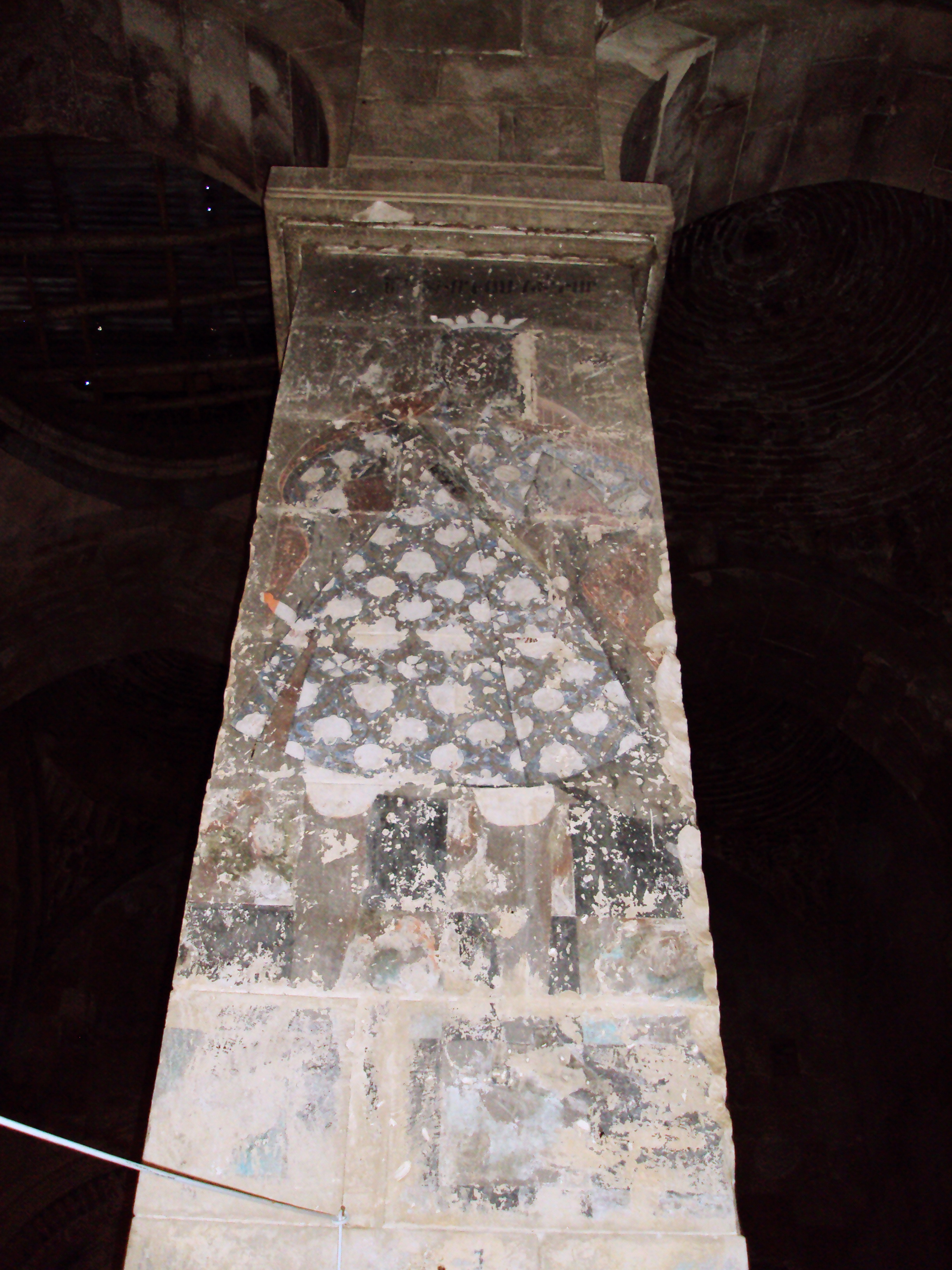
Varagavank, fresco, 2011

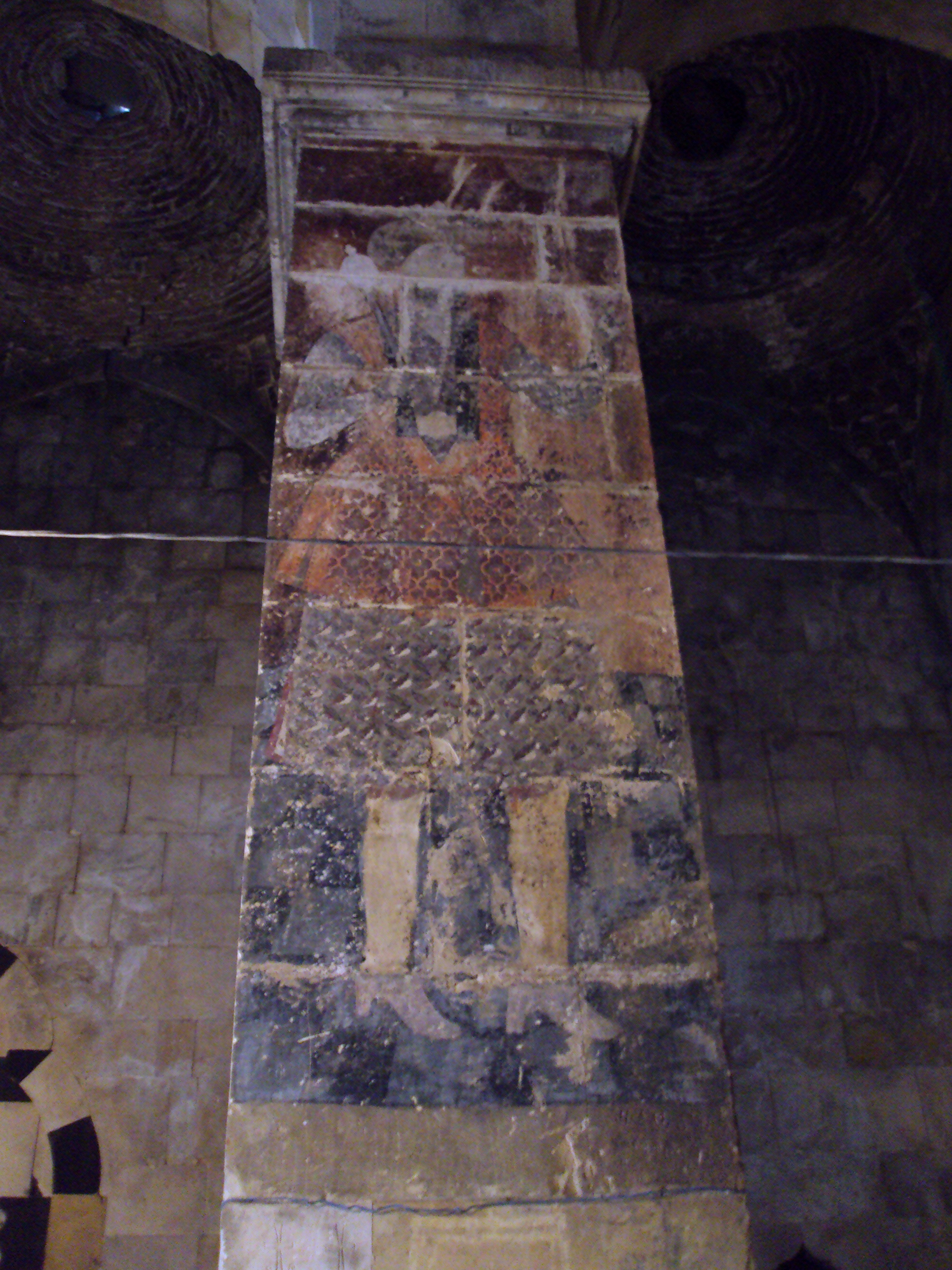
Varagavank, fresco, 2011

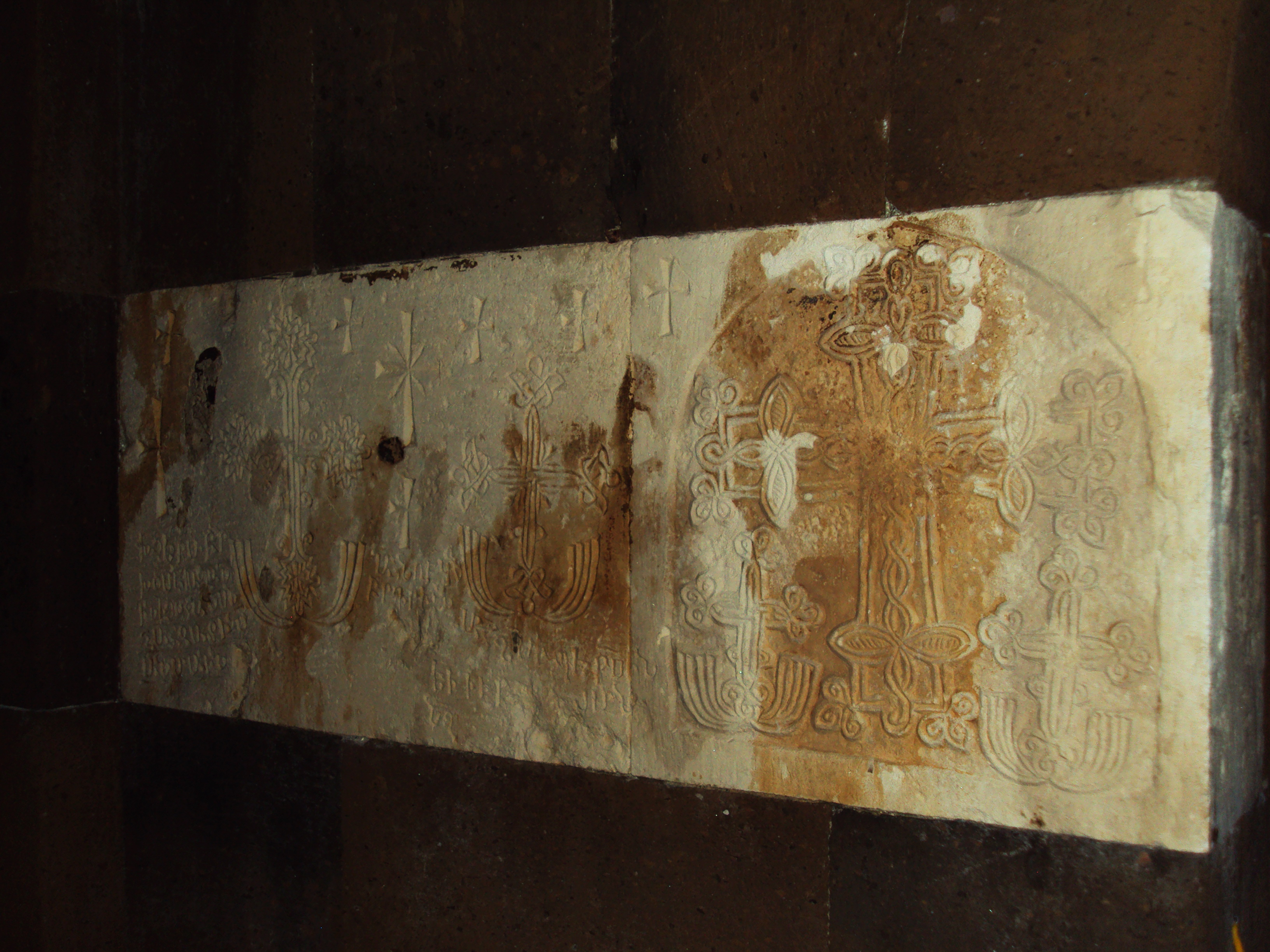
Varagavank, ornament, 2011

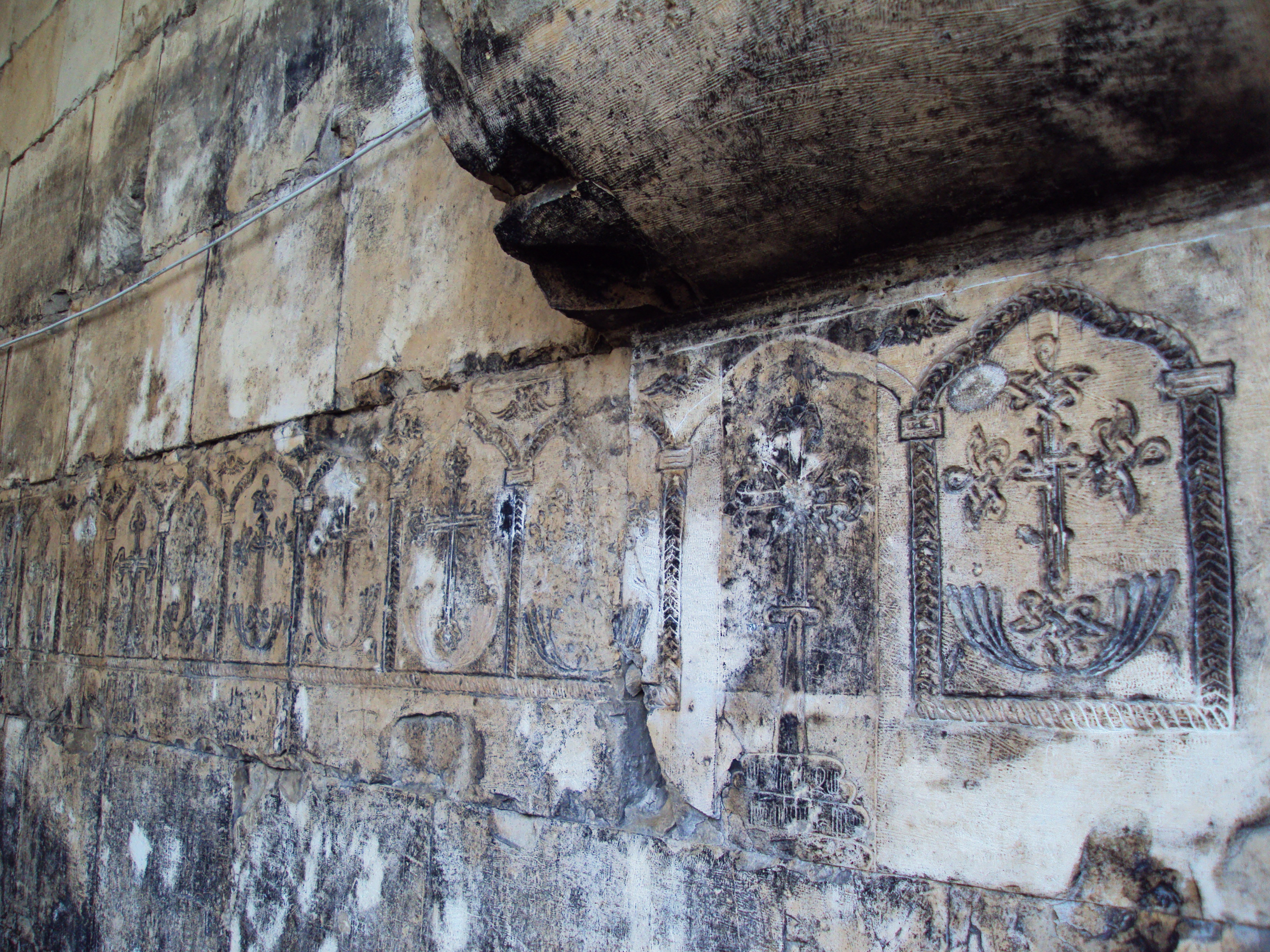
Varagavank, ornament, 2011

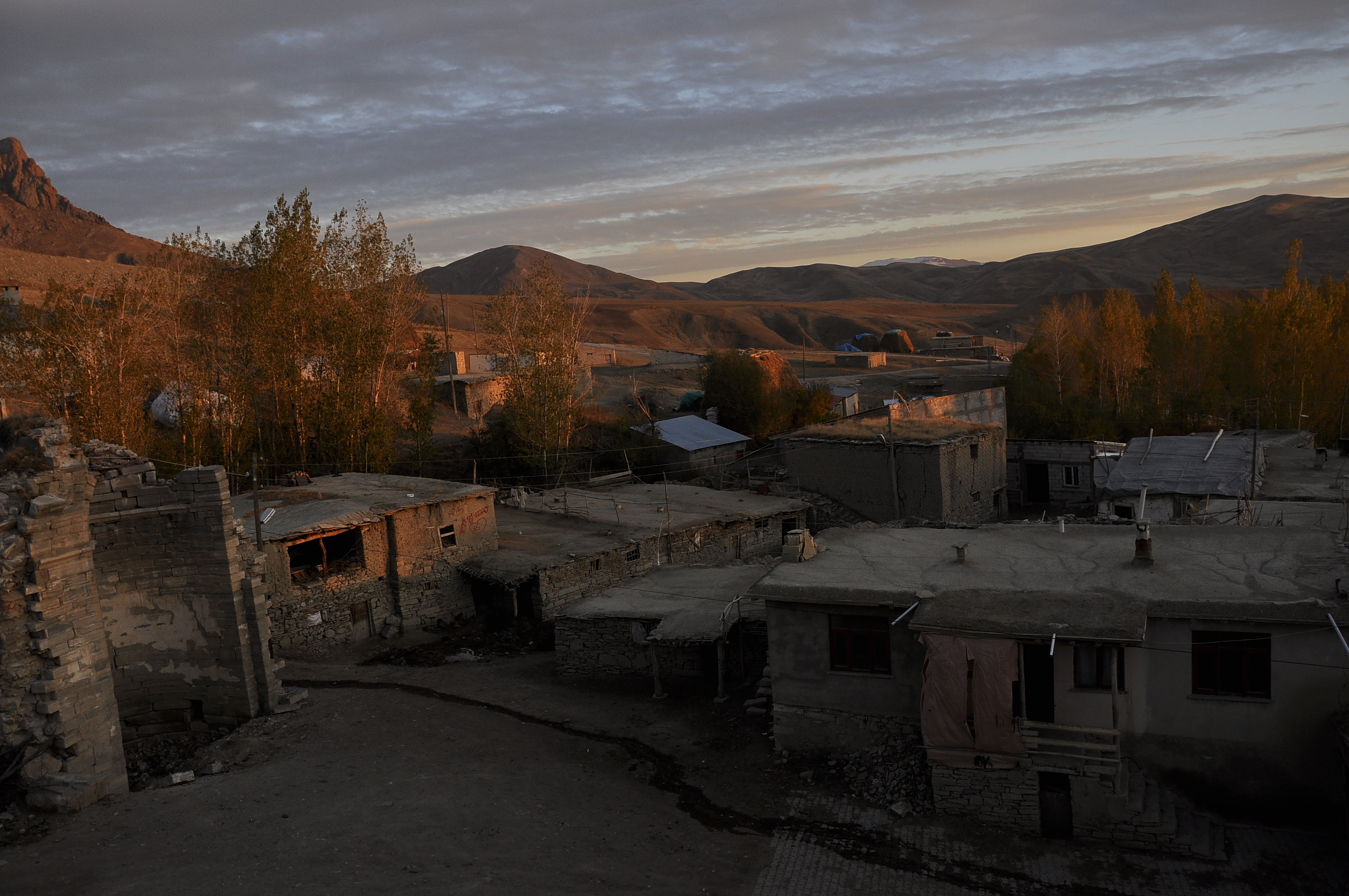
Taken from the roof of Varagavank, 2013

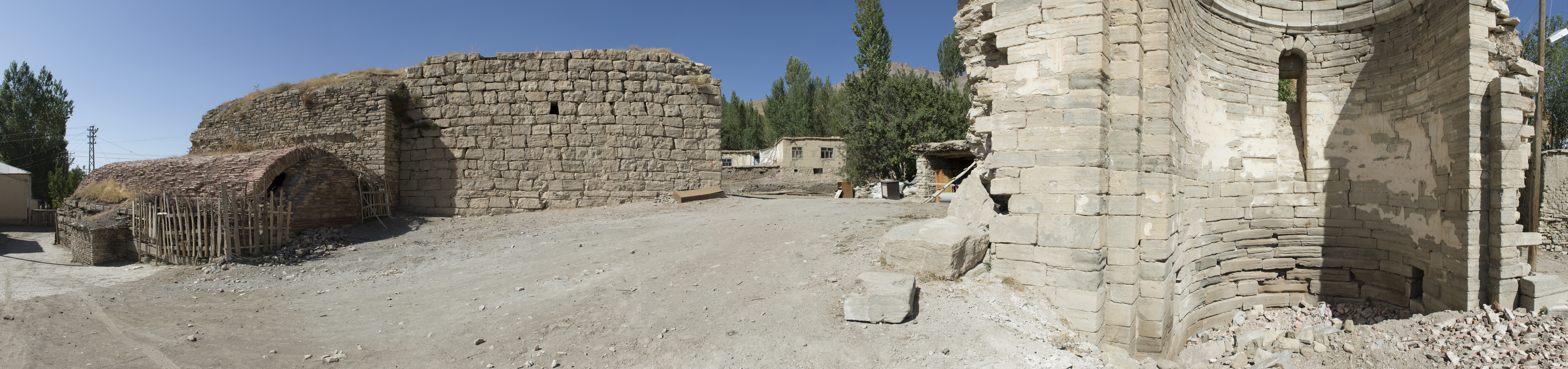
Van Yedi Kilise aka Varagavank

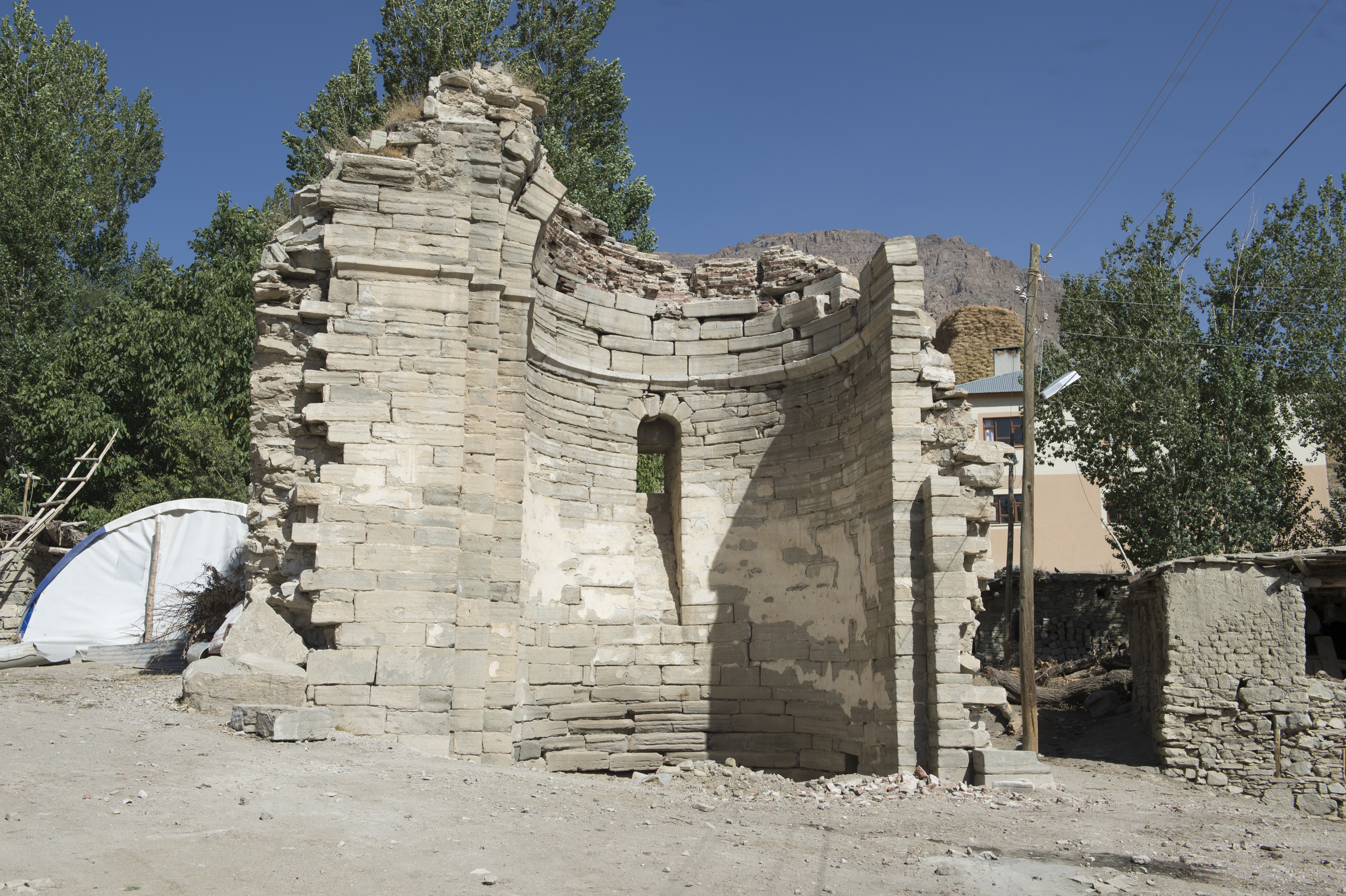
Van Yedi Kilise aka Varagavank

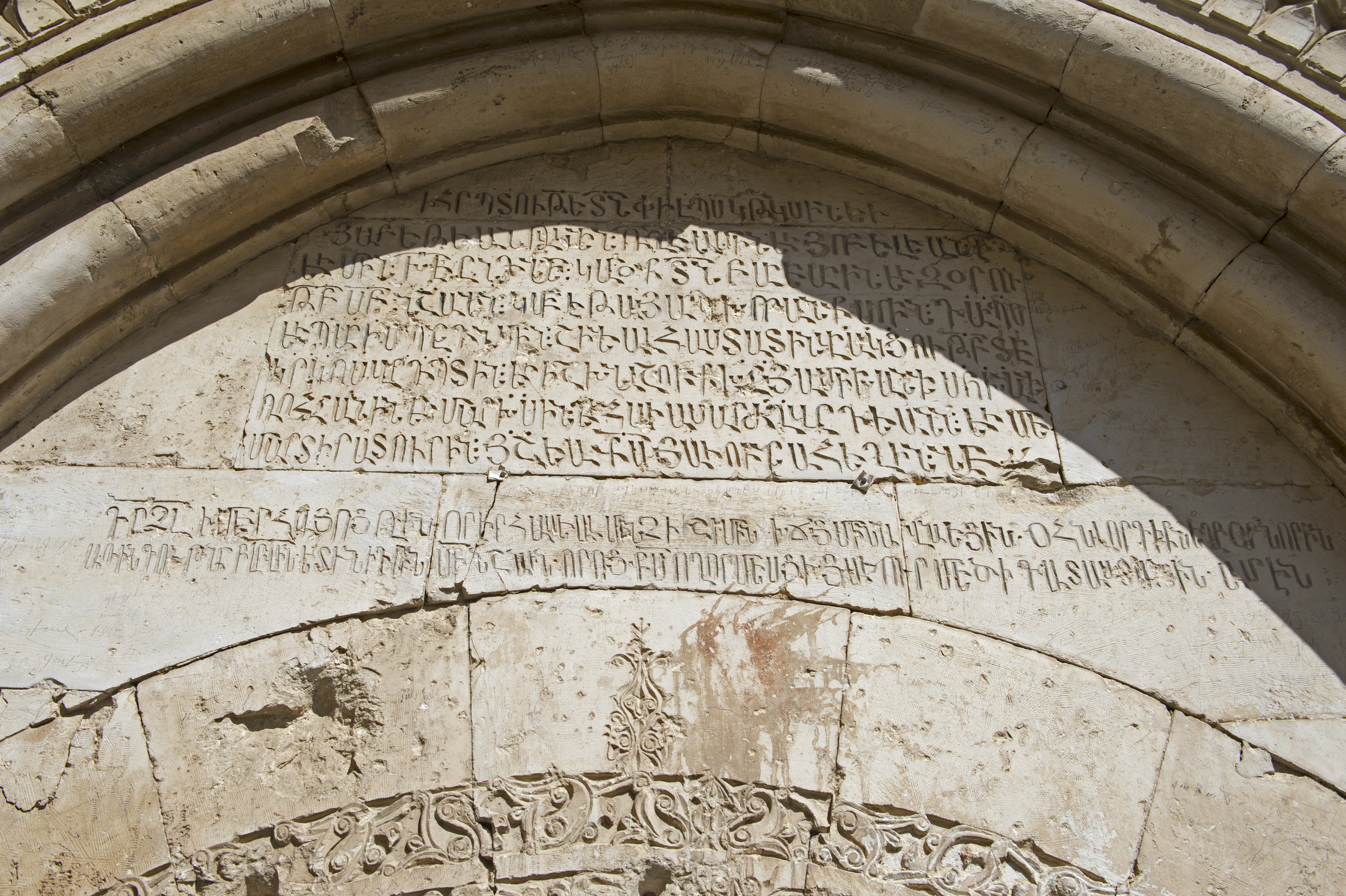
Van Yedi Kilise aka Varagavank

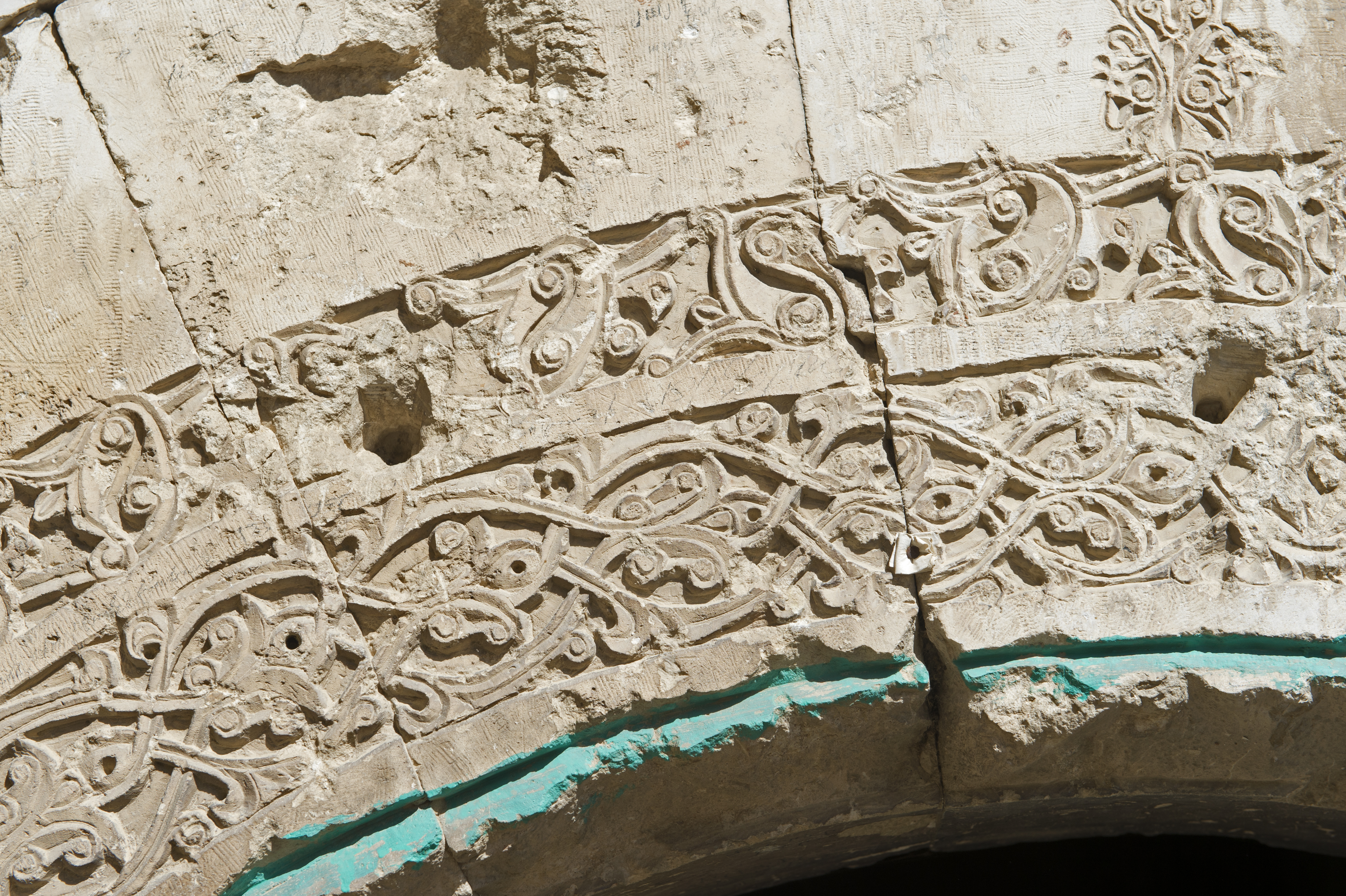
Van Yedi Kilise aka Varagavank

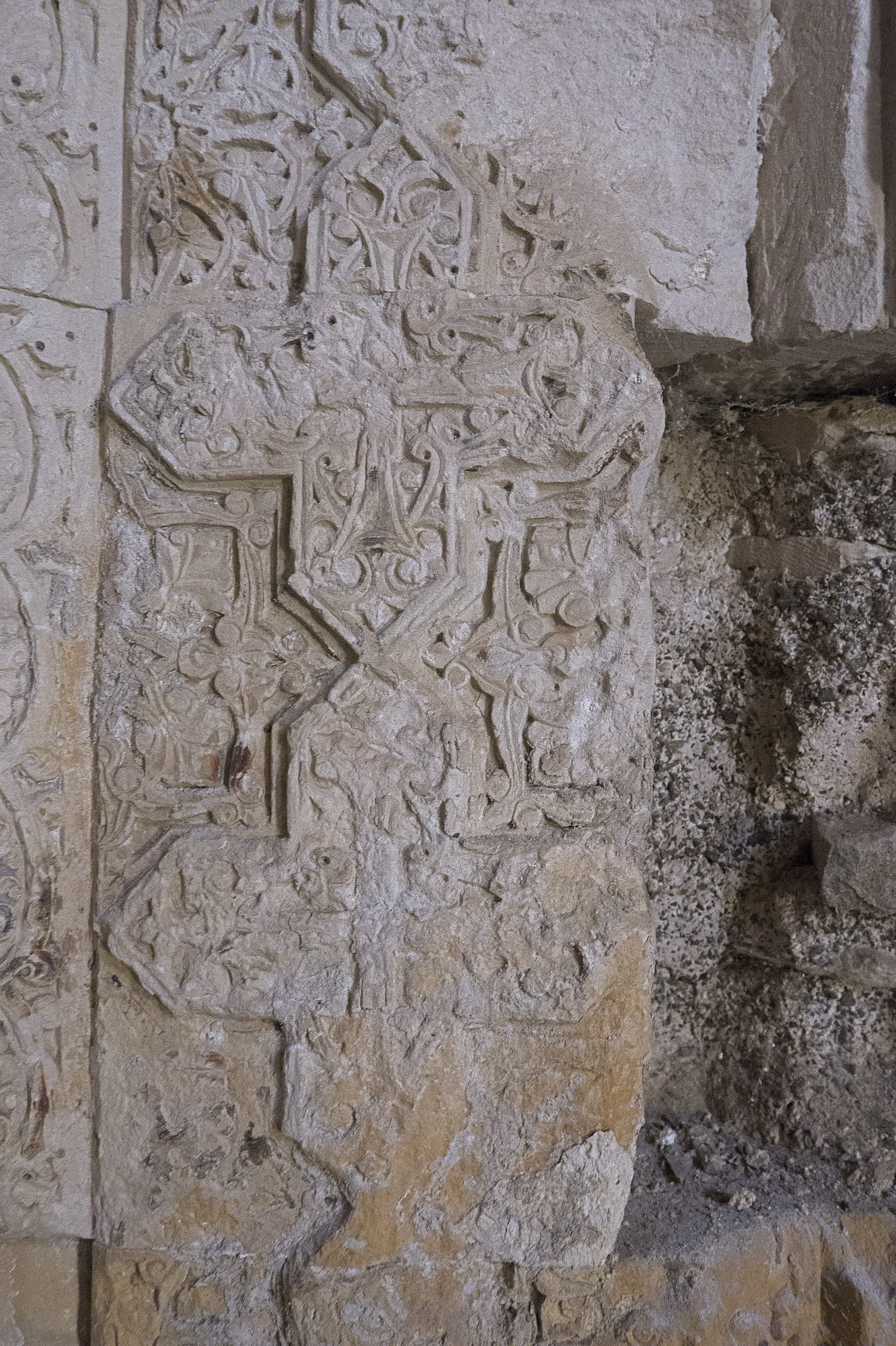
Van Yedi Kilise aka Varagavank

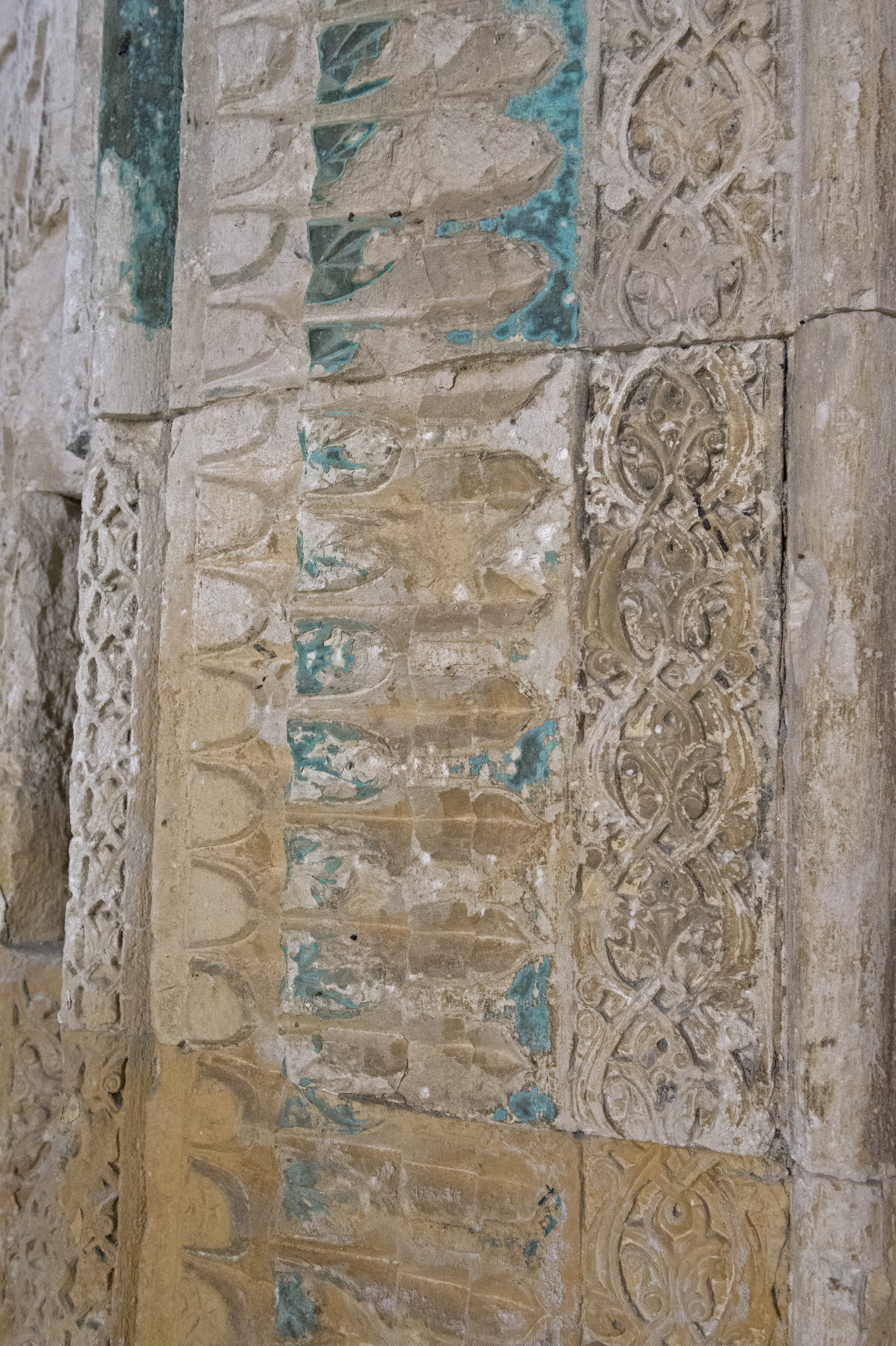
Van Yedi Kilise aka Varagavank

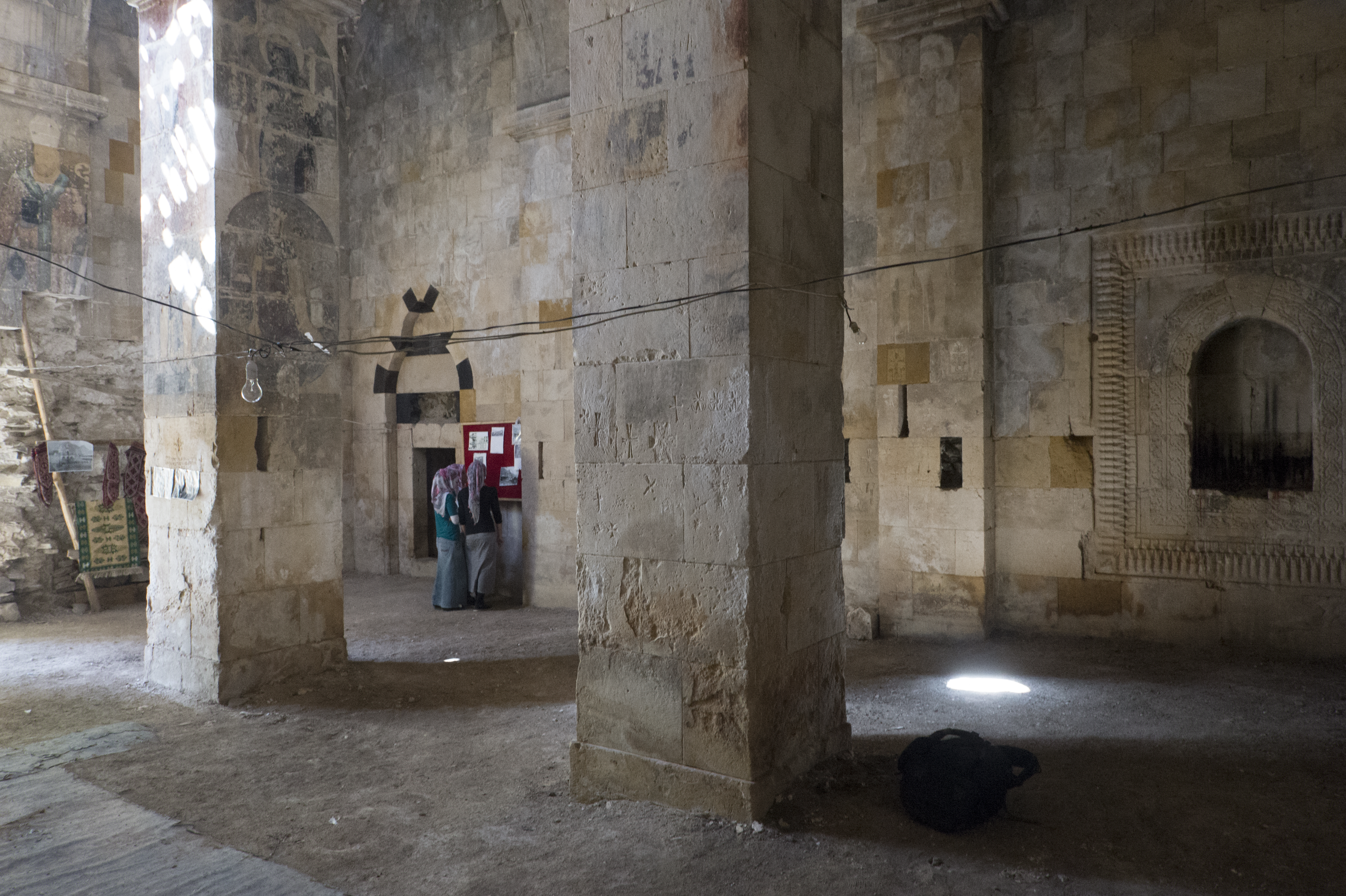
Van Yedi Kilise aka Varagavank

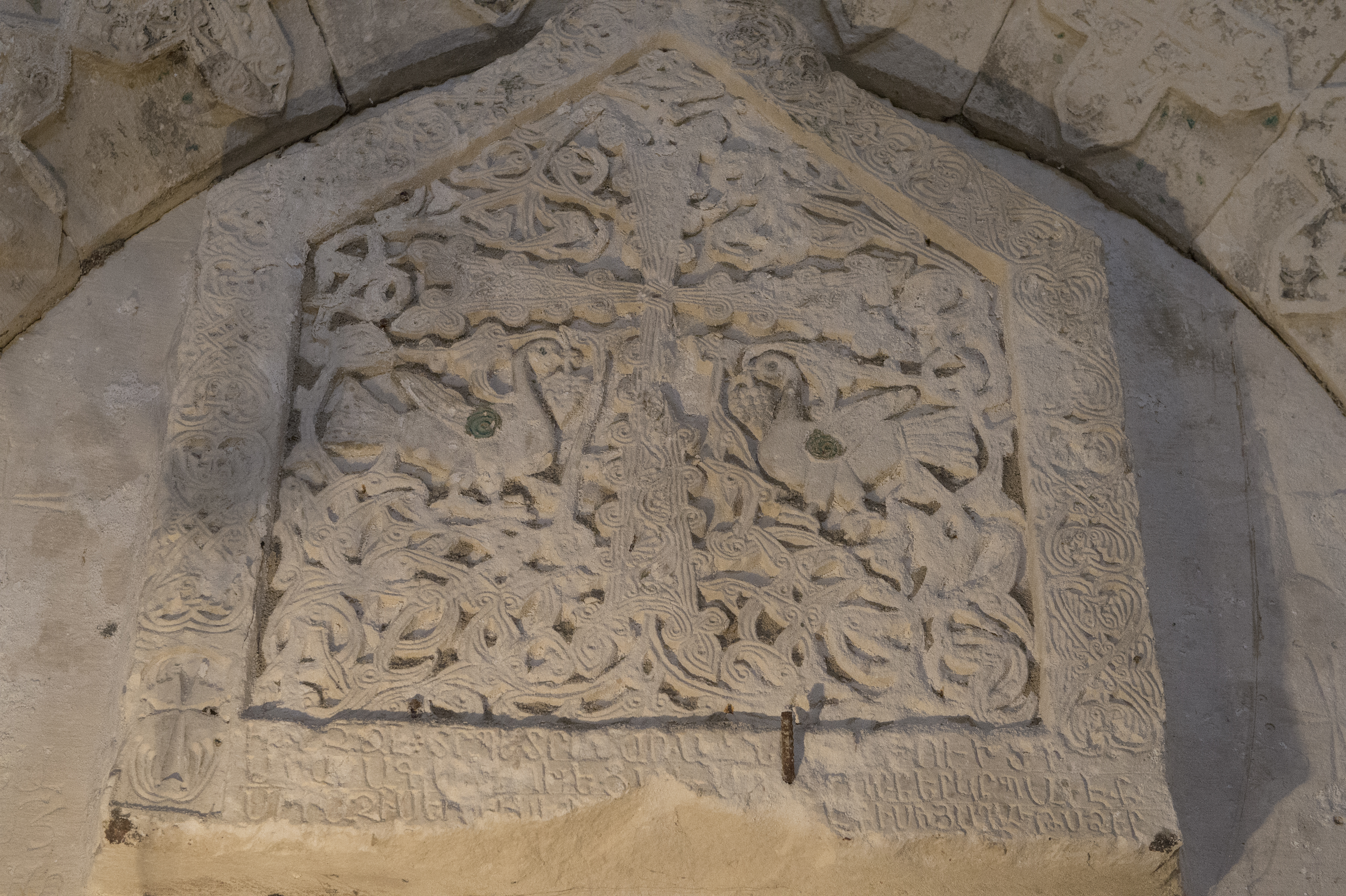
Van Yedi Kilise aka Varagavank

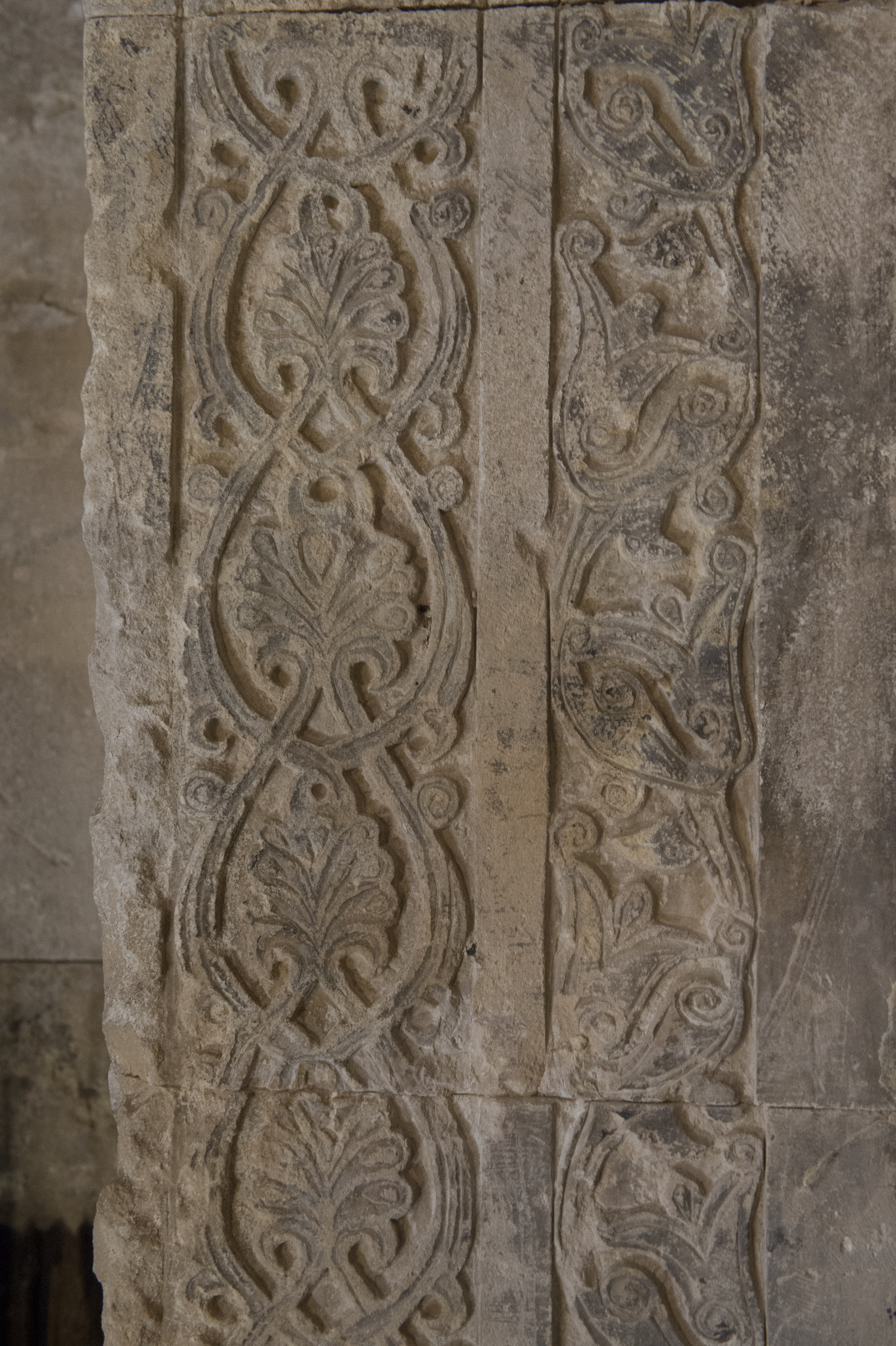
Van Yedi Kilise aka Varagavank

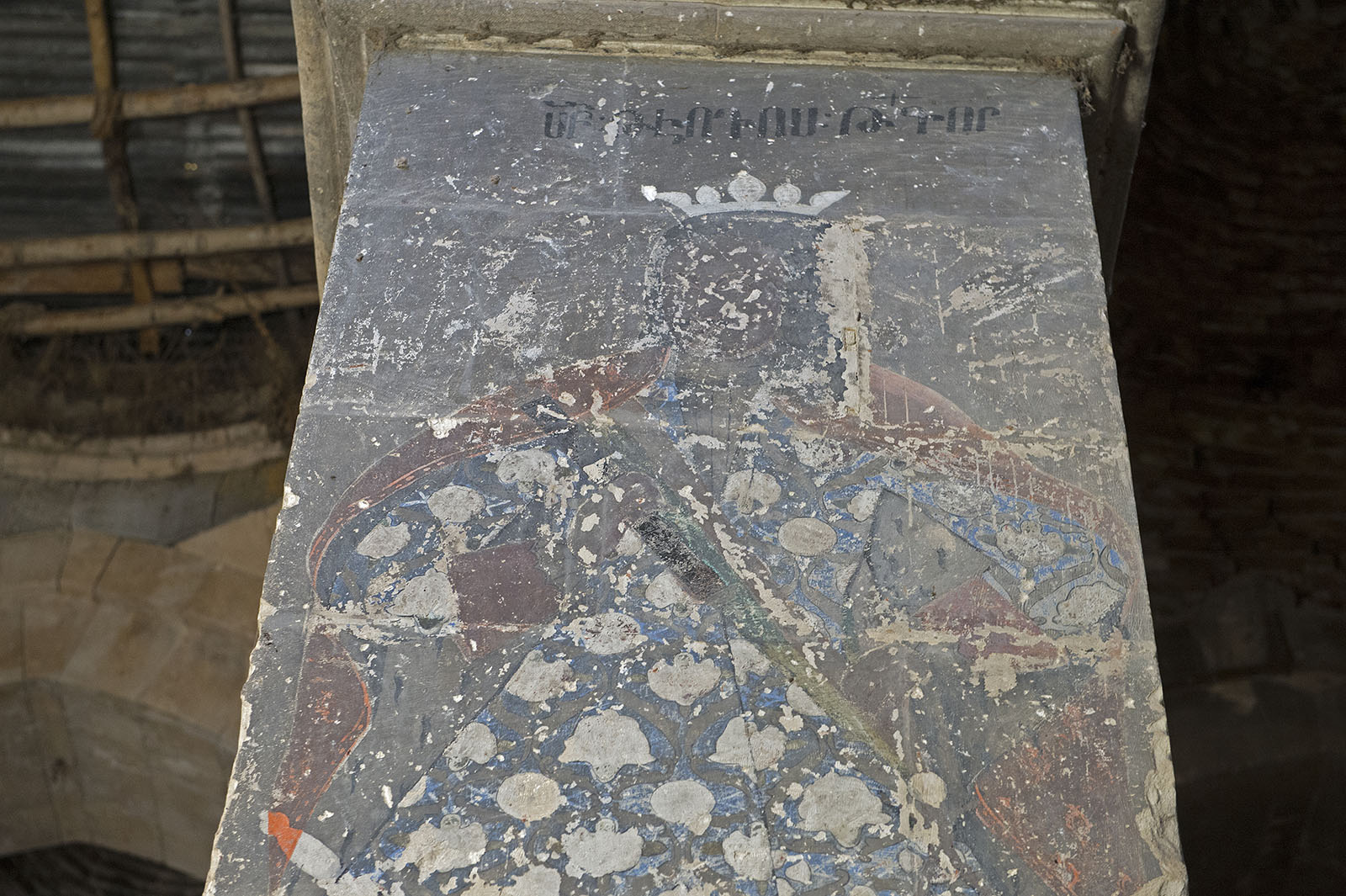
Van Yedi Kilise aka Varagavank

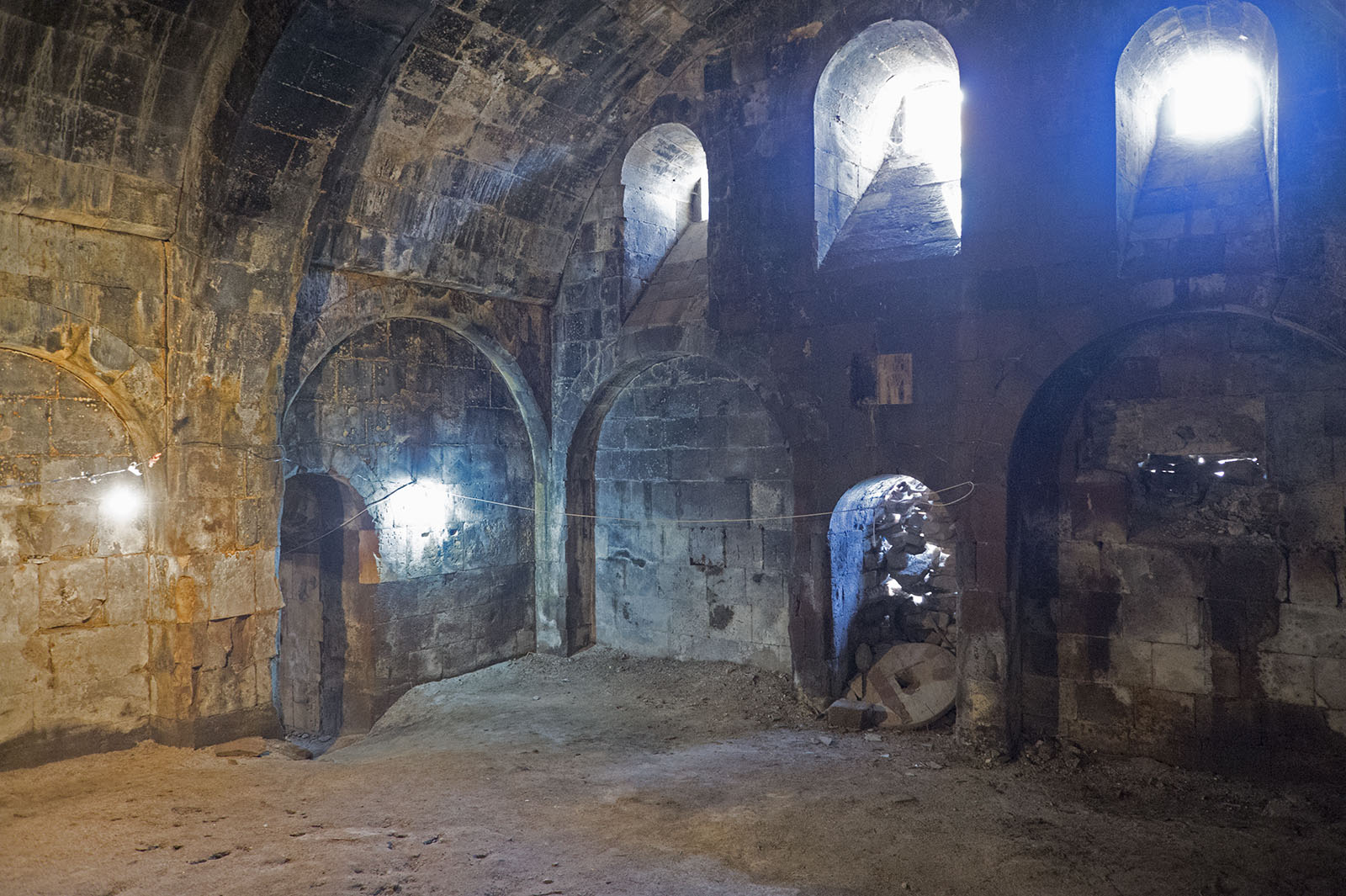
Van Yedi Kilise aka Varagavank

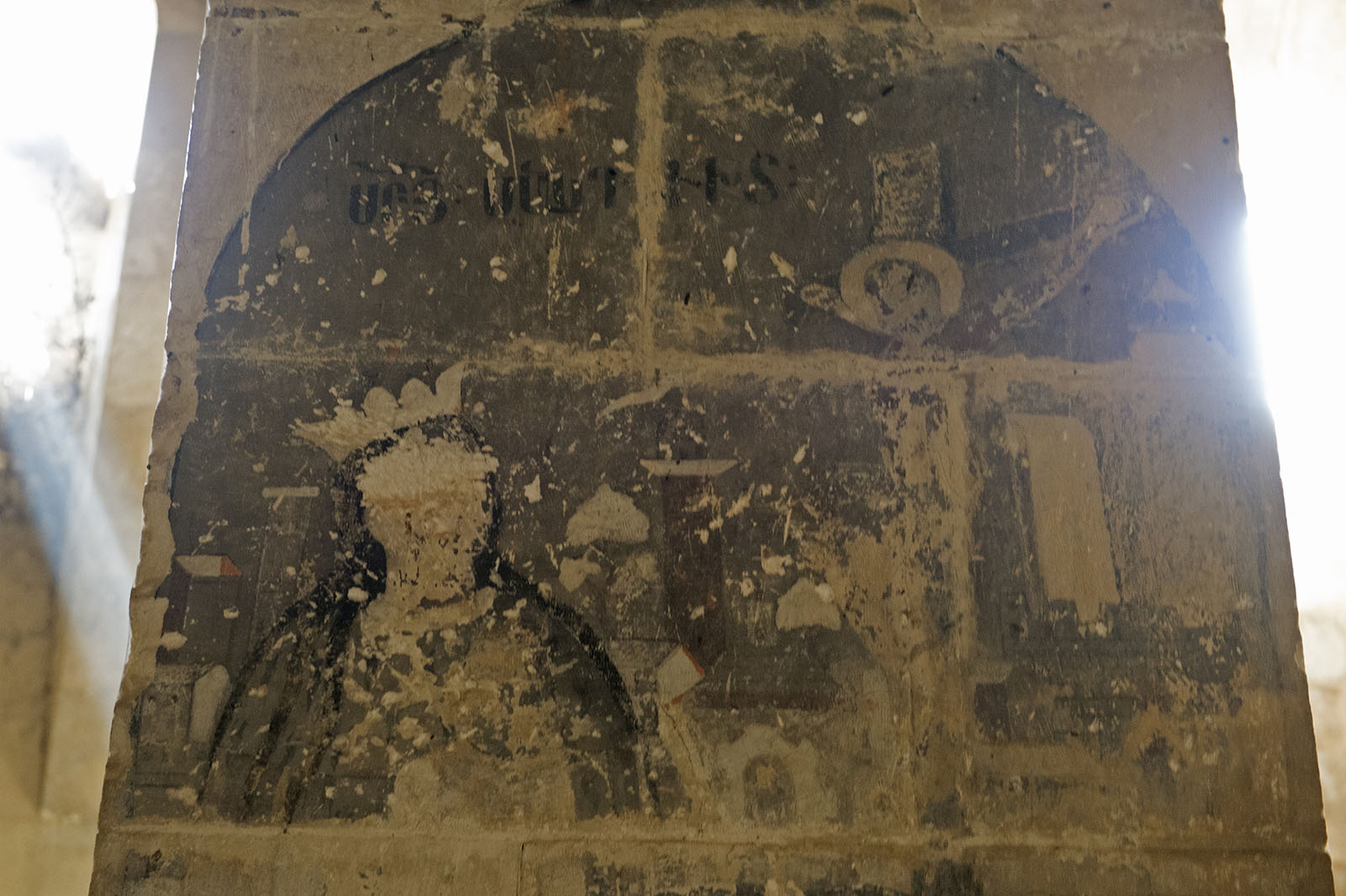
Van Yedi Kilise aka Varagavank

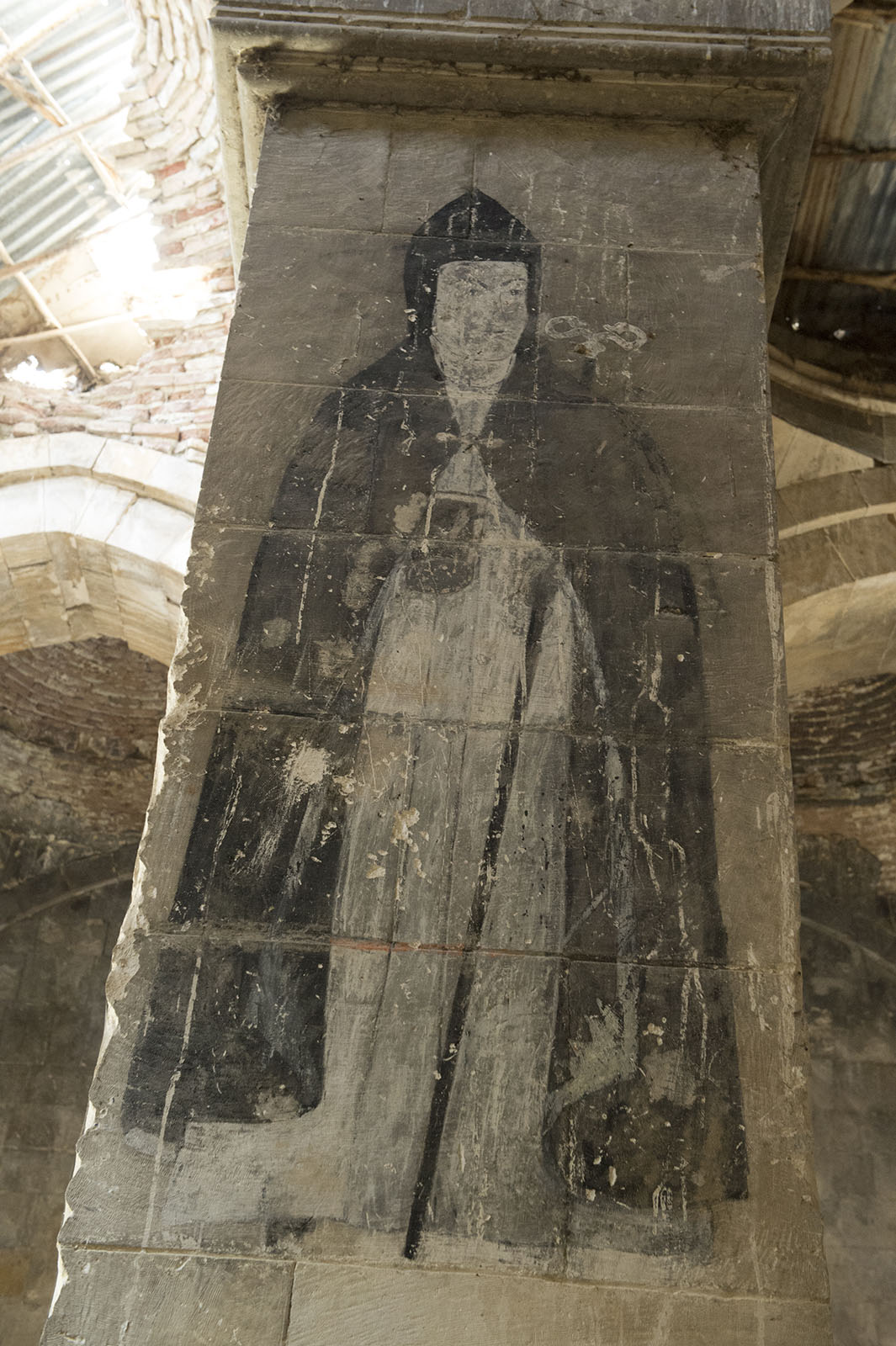
Van Yedi Kilise aka Varagavank

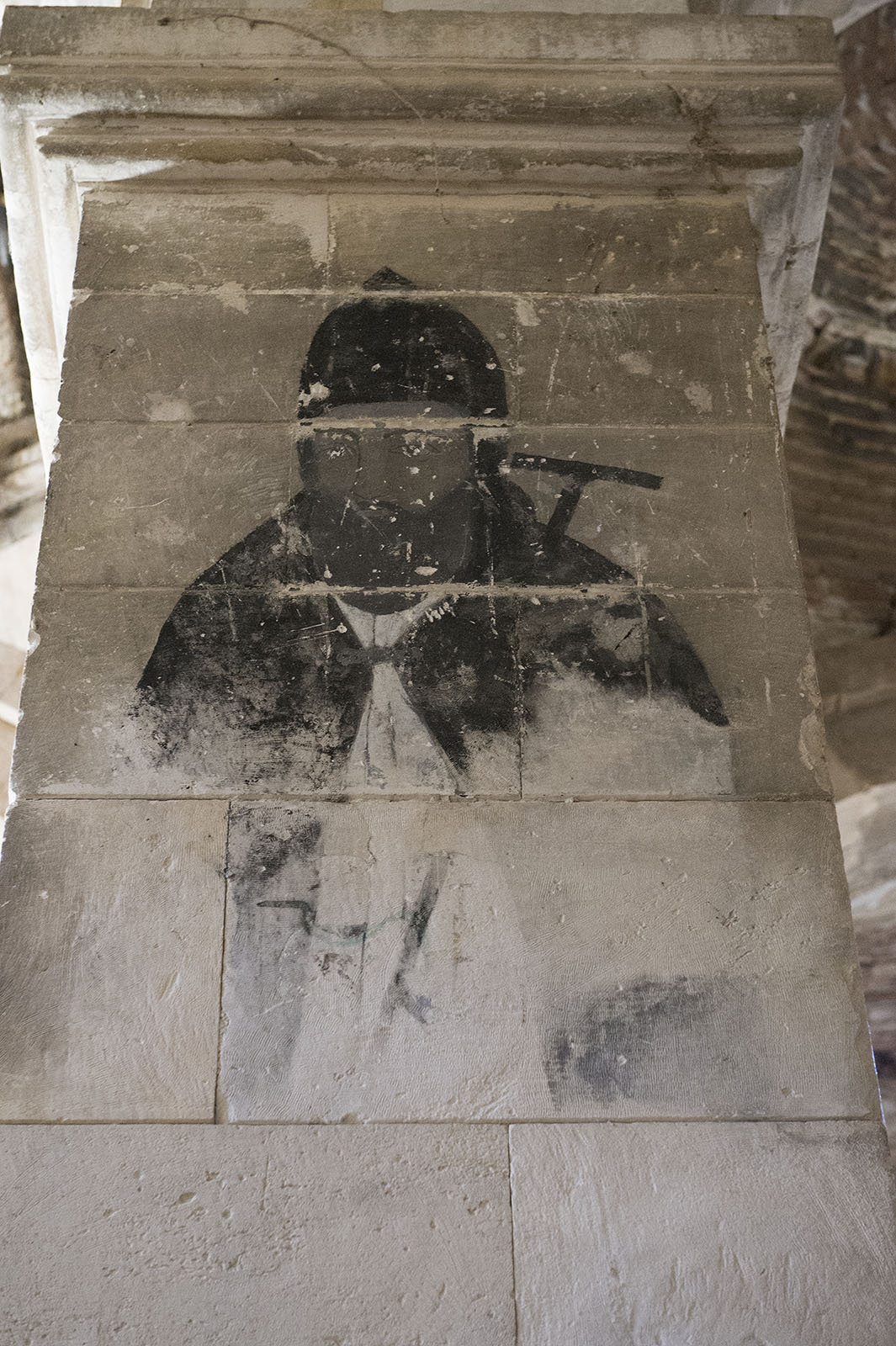
Van Yedi Kilise aka Varagavank

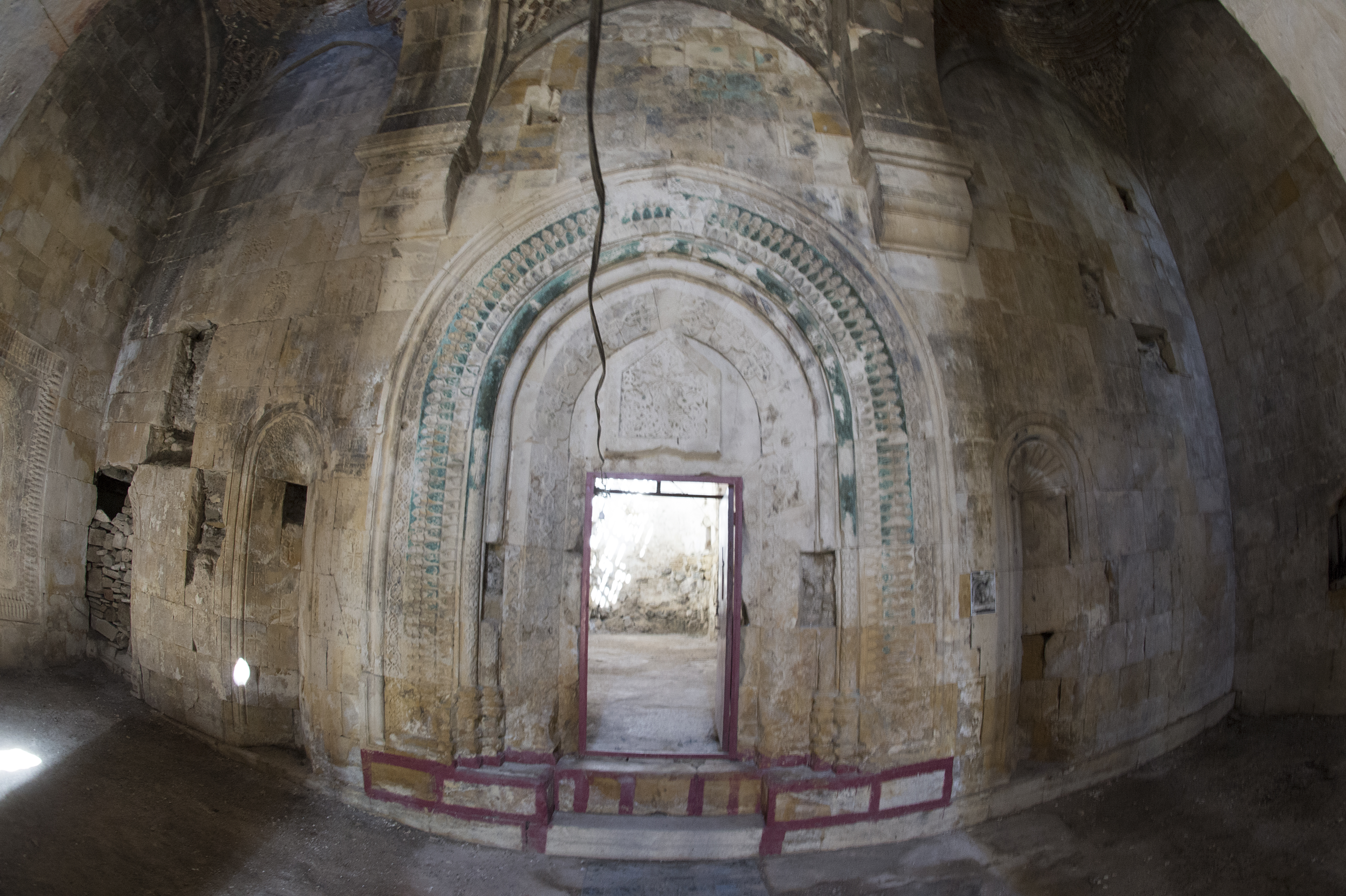
Van Yedi Kilise aka Varagavank

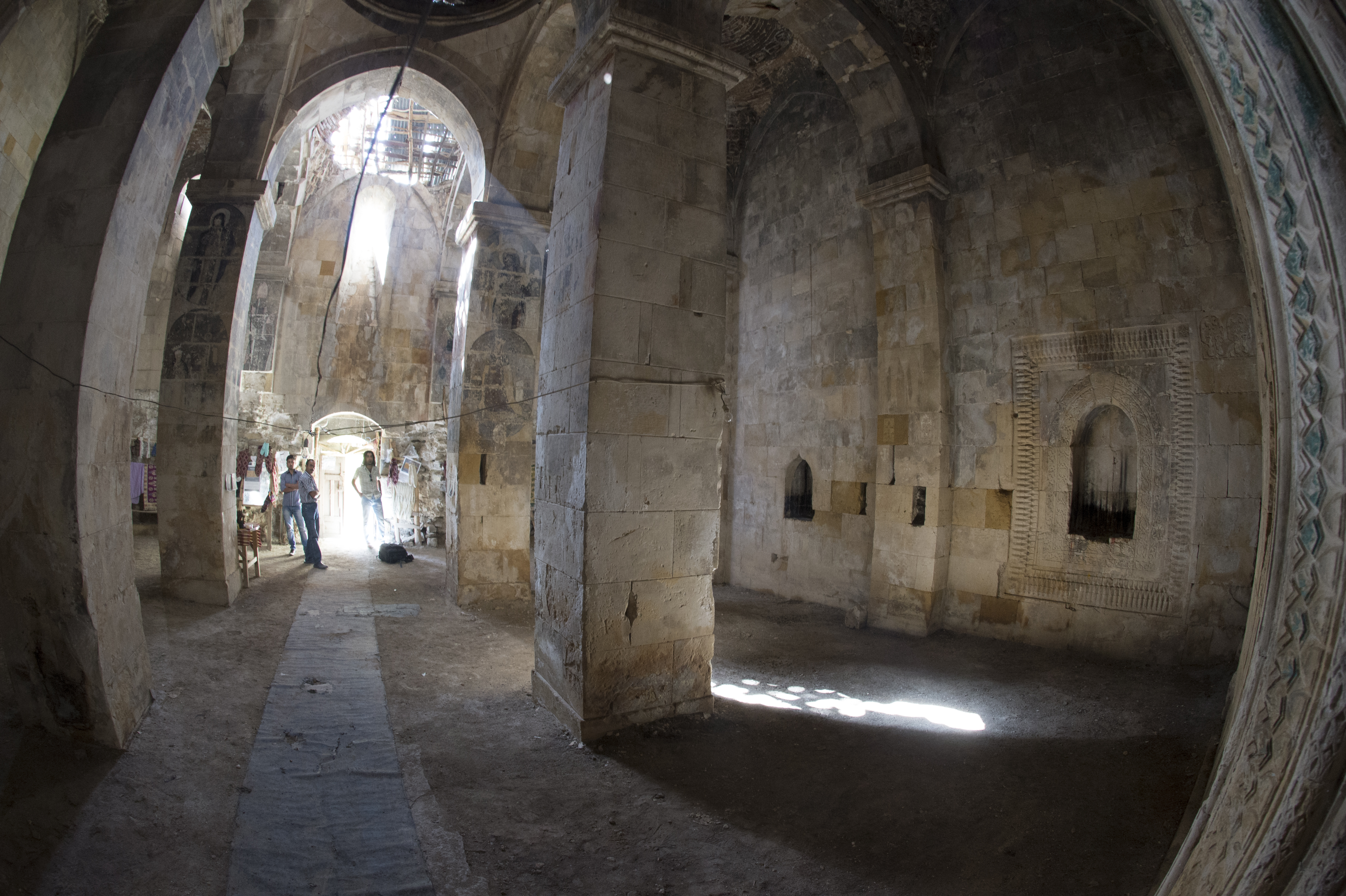
Van Yedi Kilise aka Varagavank

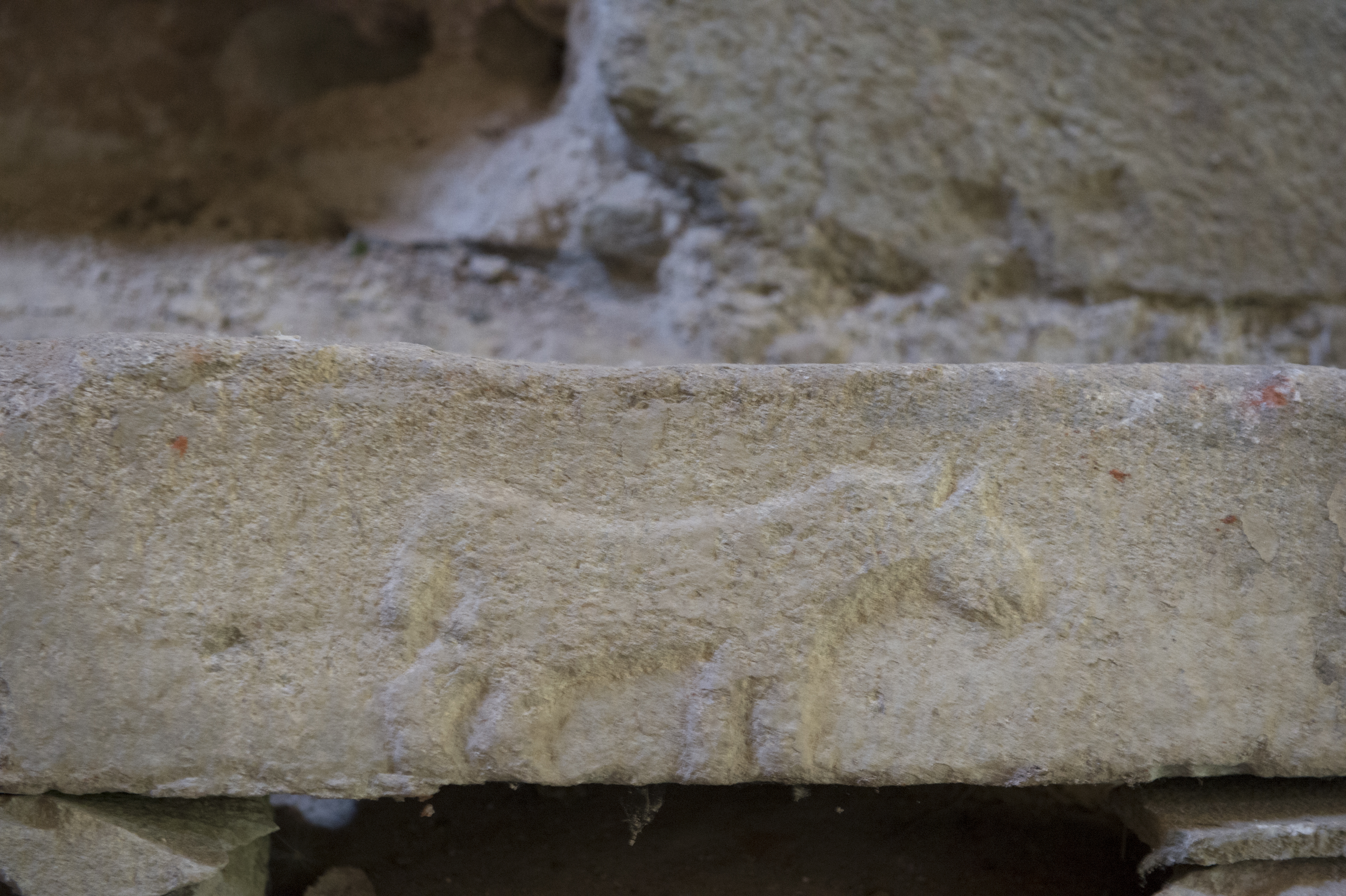

== Bibliography ==
- Bachmann, Walter [in German] (1913). Kirchen und moscheen in Armenien und Kurdistan [Churches and mosques in Armenia and Kurdistan]. 25. Wissenschaftliche veröffenlichung der Deutschen Orient-gesellschaft. Leipzig: J. C. Hinrichs.
