= Grace Knapp =

American missionary who witnessed the Armenian genocide in eastern Turkey

Grace H. Knapp
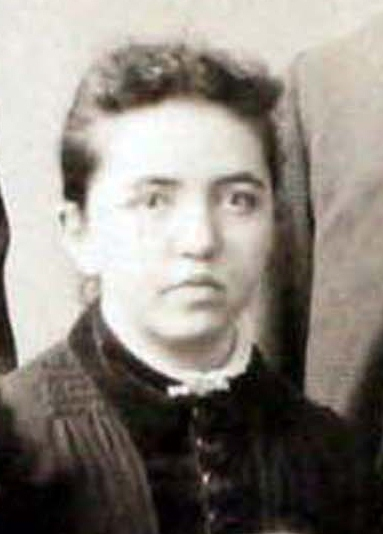
- Grace H. Knapp in 1885
- Born: Grace Highley Knapp; November 21, 1870; Bitlis, Ottoman Empire
- Died: March 14, 1953 (aged 82); Auburndale, Massachusetts, United States
- Occupation: Christian missionary
- Known for: Witness to the Armenian genocide

Grace H. Knapp (21 November 1870 – 14 March 1953) was an American Christian missionary and teacher who served in the Ottoman Empire. During her time as a missionary, Knapp was a witness to the Armenian genocide. During the Armenian genocide, Knapp was stationed in Van and eventually described the events in the region in two published books describing her experiences. The first book, The Mission at Van in Turkey in War Time, describes in detail the massacres of Armenians by Turkish soldiers during the Van Resistance. Her second book, The Tragedy of Bitlis, relates the narratives of two nurses who witnessed massacres of Armenians in Bitlis. Her recounts of Bitlis are one of the few written accounts of massacres in that area.

== Early life ==
Grace Highley Knapp was born on 21 November 1870 to missionary parents in Bitlis, Ottoman Empire. Her father, Reverend George Cushing Knapp, was a dedicated missionary and her mother, Alzina Churchill Knapp, was a teacher. In April 1883, at the age of twelve, Knapp moved to the United States to receive an education in Massachusetts, Vermont and Illinois. In 1889, she began studying at the Mount Holyoke College and graduated in 1893. She then returned to the Ottoman Empire in October of that year where she taught at the Mount Holyoke Seminary of Kurdistan, located in Bitlis. She later taught at Erzurum and Van, where she was assigned to teach at different points in time.

== Witness of the Armenian genocide ==
=== Background ===
In the First Balkan War of 1912–13, the Ottoman Empire had lost its Balkan possessions to Christian uprisings, intensifying fears in the Turkish homeland that the Empire's increasingly restive Armenian Christian minority—with the assistance or encouragement of Western governments—might also attempt to establish an independent state, resulting in the breakup of Turkey itself. As a result of the wars, at least half a million Muslim Ottomans from the former Balkan possessions of the Empire sought refuge in Turkey, sparking a desire for revenge among many Turks. Distrust and suspicion of Armenians reached a peak following the outbreak of World War I, when a successful advance of Russian troops across the Turkish border into the heavily Armenian-populated vilayet of Van in early 1915 was blamed on Armenian disloyalty, leading the Turkish government to adopt a set of extreme measures which would culminate in the Armenian genocide.

=== Massacres in Van ===
Grace Knapp relates in her memoirs The mission at Van in Turkey in war time that she was in Van at the outbreak of World War I. She notes that during mobilization of the Ottoman army in the fall of 1914, many Armenians were ransacked and their wealth stolen. Armenian soldiers conscripted in the Ottoman army were subjugated to maltreatment and were forced to do manual labor under harsh conditions. Prior to the conscription, the arms of the Armenians were confiscated and the population was left in a vulnerable state at a time of war. Knapp states that despite the confiscations of the weapons, the Armenians held their restraint and forbade any further escalation of tensions. They prevented fights from occurring and forbade Armenian villagers from conducting any sort of insurrection.

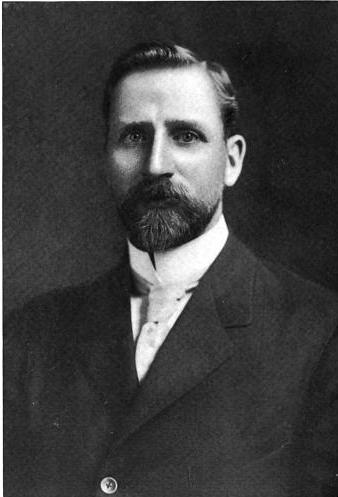
Like Grace Knapp, missionary Clarence Ussher was in Van during the Armenian genocide. In 1917 Ussher published a memoir about his experiences entitled An American Physician in Turkey: A Narrative of Adventures in Peace and War in which he wrote that 55,000 Armenians were killed in Van alone. It is considered one of the most detailed eyewitness accounts of the events.

In February 1915, missionary Clarence Ussher, who was stationed in the American hospital in Van, relates in his memoir An American Physician in Turkey: A Narrative of Adventures in Peace and War, that the "strong and liberal-minded" governor or vali of the province was replaced with Cevdet Bey, (Note: Also rendered as Jevdet, Djevdet etc. Cevdet's actual name was Tahir Cevdet; "Bey" is a Turkish honorific.) brother-in-law of the Turkish Commander-in-Chief, Enver Pasha. The new vali was unable to travel to Van until late March, when he arrived "accompanied by several thousand soldiers and Kurdish and Circassian irregulars".

Knapp's memoir recounts the arrival of Cevdet Bey in similar detail to that of Ussher's. Just as Ussher notes in his own memoirs, Knapp writes that one of Cevdet's first acts was to demand of the Van Armenians that they supply 3,000 able-bodied men (Ussher states 4,000) for work battalions, but the Armenian leadership, fearful of Cevdet's intentions, offered 400 men (Ussher states 500) and payment of the standard exemption fee for the rest, which Cevdet rejected. On 16 April, Cevdet had a community leader in the town of Shadakh arrested, but the townspeople, acting on a rumour of his impending murder, surrounded the police station demanding his release. Ussher relates in his memoir that Cevdet then invited a small group of Armenian leaders to visit Shadakh on a peace mission, but had them assassinated en route. After the murder, Knapp relates that the Armenians urged Ussher to pacify the governor. Hence, Ussher himself, who had known Cevdet Bey since childhood, paid a visit to the vali in the hope of defusing tensions. Ussher recounts his meeting with Cevdet as follows:

While I was in his office the colonel of the Vali's Regiment, which he called his Kasab Tabouri, or Butcher Regiment, composed of Turkish convicts, entered and said, "You sent for me." "Yes," replied Jevdet; "go to Shadakh and wipe out its people." And turning to me he said savagely, "I won't leave one, not one so high", holding his hand below the height of his knee."

Ussher later suggests that this exchange was an intentional deception, as the regiment in question did not attack Shadakh but was instead diverted to a valley where they "destroyed six villages containing nothing but old men, women and children"; other sources however suggest that the diversion was simply due to the indiscipline of the unit. Knapp describes the aftermath of the Ussher's account in similar detail. After this, Cevdet again demanded that 4,000 Armenian men "give themselves up to the military", releasing a couple of Armenian leaders as a goodwill gesture, but the Armenians, by now convinced of Cevdet's hostile intentions, delayed giving a reply. Meanwhile, Ussher and the Italian Consular Agent, Signor Sbordini, continued negotiating with Cevdet, attempting to persuade him that his actions were inflaming rather than calming the situation, but Cevdet had by this time chosen another course. On 19 April, he had a secret order issued to his forces in the vilayet:

The Armenians must be exterminated. If any Muslim protect a Christian, first, his house shall be burned; then the Christian killed before his eyes, and then his [the Moslem's] family and himself.

Cevdet Bey, Knapp likewise wrote, was to "first punish Shadakh" and was to then punish those who resisted by killing of "every man, woman and child of the Christians." What then followed was what contemporary historians call Cevdet Bey's "reign of terror" in which 55,000 Armenians estimated were to be killed.

=== Van resistance ===
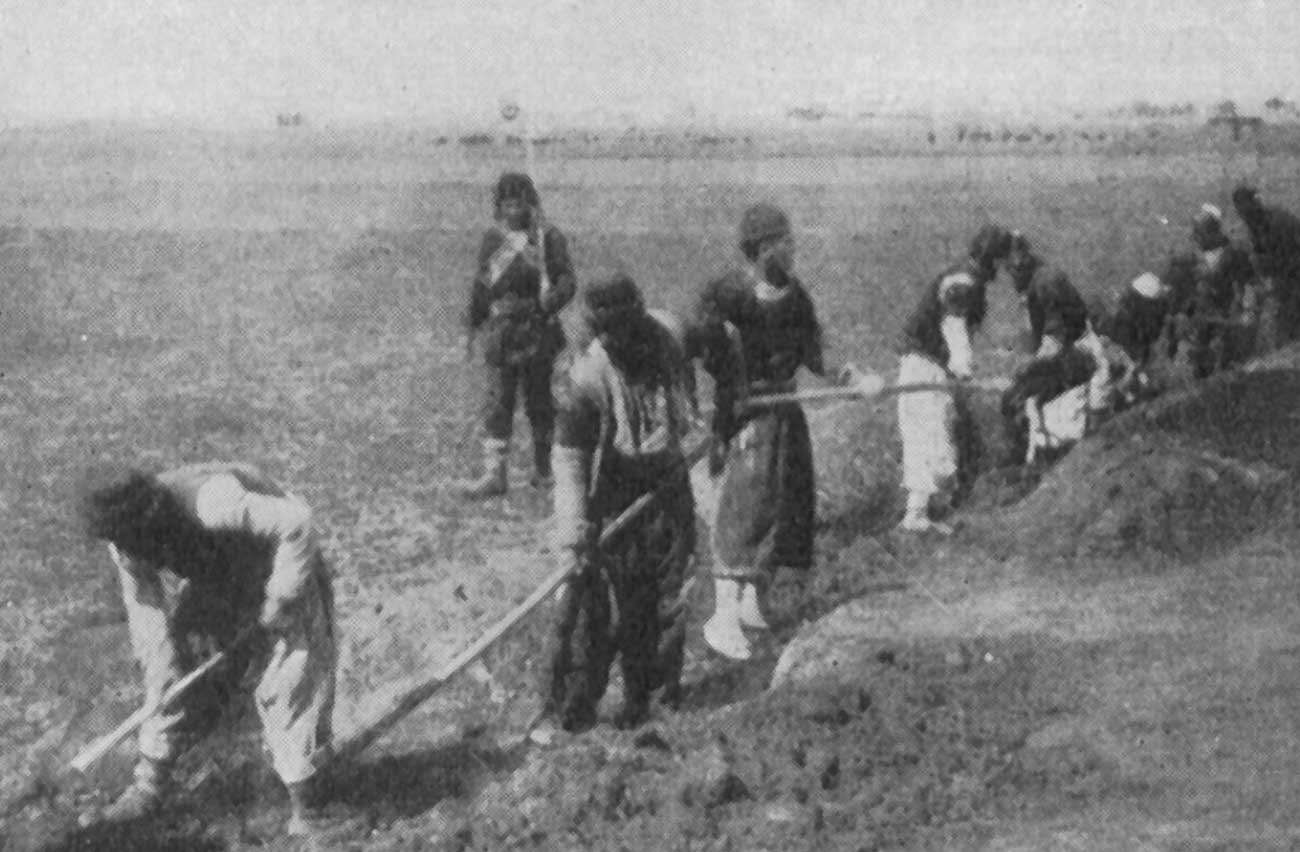
Armenians digging trenches

Grace Knapp states that the Armenians were not planning a "rebellion" as the governor claims, but trying to find a peaceful way to resolve the conflict. Other eyewitnesses, such as Elizabeth Ussher, the wife of Clarence Ussher, similarly wrote that "although the Vali calls it a rebellion, it is really an effort to protect the lives and the homes of the Armenians." Nevertheless, the Armenians began to dig trenches, and prepared to defend themselves. Ussher states that the Armenians were deprived of many of its able-bodied men due to the mobilization, and were limited in ammunition and weapons due to the confiscations. Knapp then recounts that Cevdet Bey demanded that fifty Turkish soldiers be stationed in the American missionary compound in Van, but this was rejected by the Armenians on the grounds that it would compromise their defensive positions. By this time, the war already started, and the guards would never be sent.

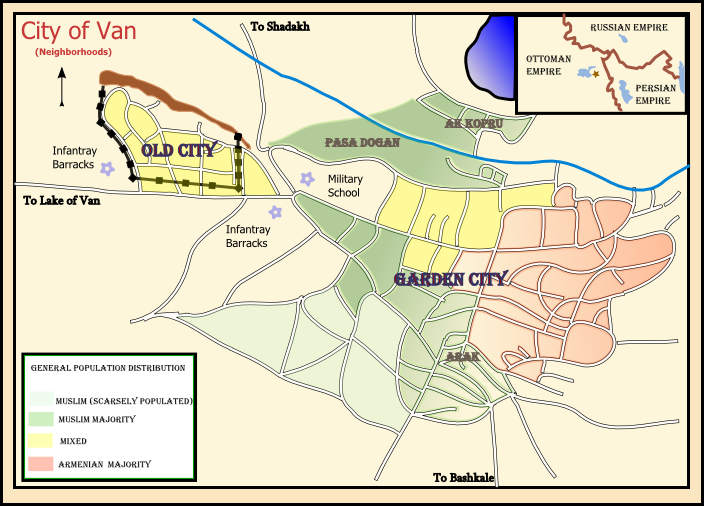
City of Van and its neighborhoods. The "Garden City" or Aikesdan in Armenian was the Armenian quarter which was besieged by Turkish troops during the siege.

According to Knapp, the attack on Van was sparked when a group of Turkish soldiers attempted to seize an Armenian girl. When two Armenian men reproached the Turks, the Turkish soldiers immediately opened fire and killed the Armenian men. A scuffle then broke out which quickly developed into "a general fusillade" followed by an artillery barrage by the Turks in the morning of 20 April. This was followed by a charge of Turkish infantry accompanied by a "Turkish mob" which was readily repulsed with small arms fire. Ussher then reports Cevdet's command attacked Armenian villages throughout the vilayet. At Arjish, the second largest town, the commander assembled the town's leaders and its 2,500 men and had them marched to a nearby river where they were slain "in groups of fifty", after which "the women and children and property were divided among the Turks". Knapp likewise writes that a man from the village of Arjish told her that on 19 April, the Armenians were gathered and then "mowed down" by Cevdet's soldiers. The village of Shadakh, previously mentioned, proved "unconquerable", and another, Moks, was effectively protected by a Kurdish chief, but while some other villages were able to mount a degree of resistance, most had no means of doing so. Ussher recounts that the Turkish forces burned the houses of the Armenian districts that had been left outside the Armenian defensive perimeter, and settled in for a siege. Knapp similarly writes that "houses were seen burning in every direction." It was after this point of the conflict that an estimated 55,000 Armenians were to be killed.

Armenian resistance in Van

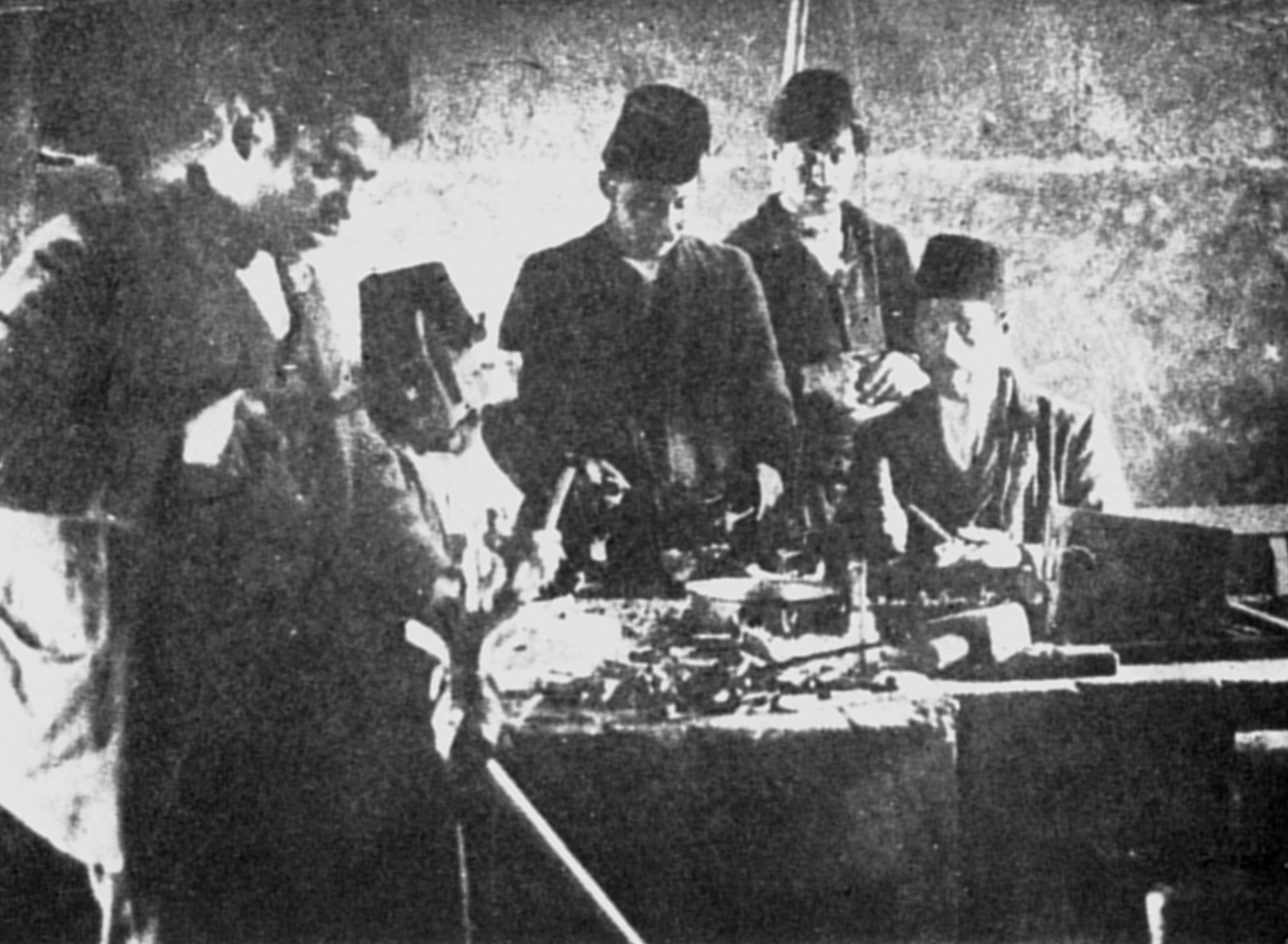
Making cartridges by hand during the defense.

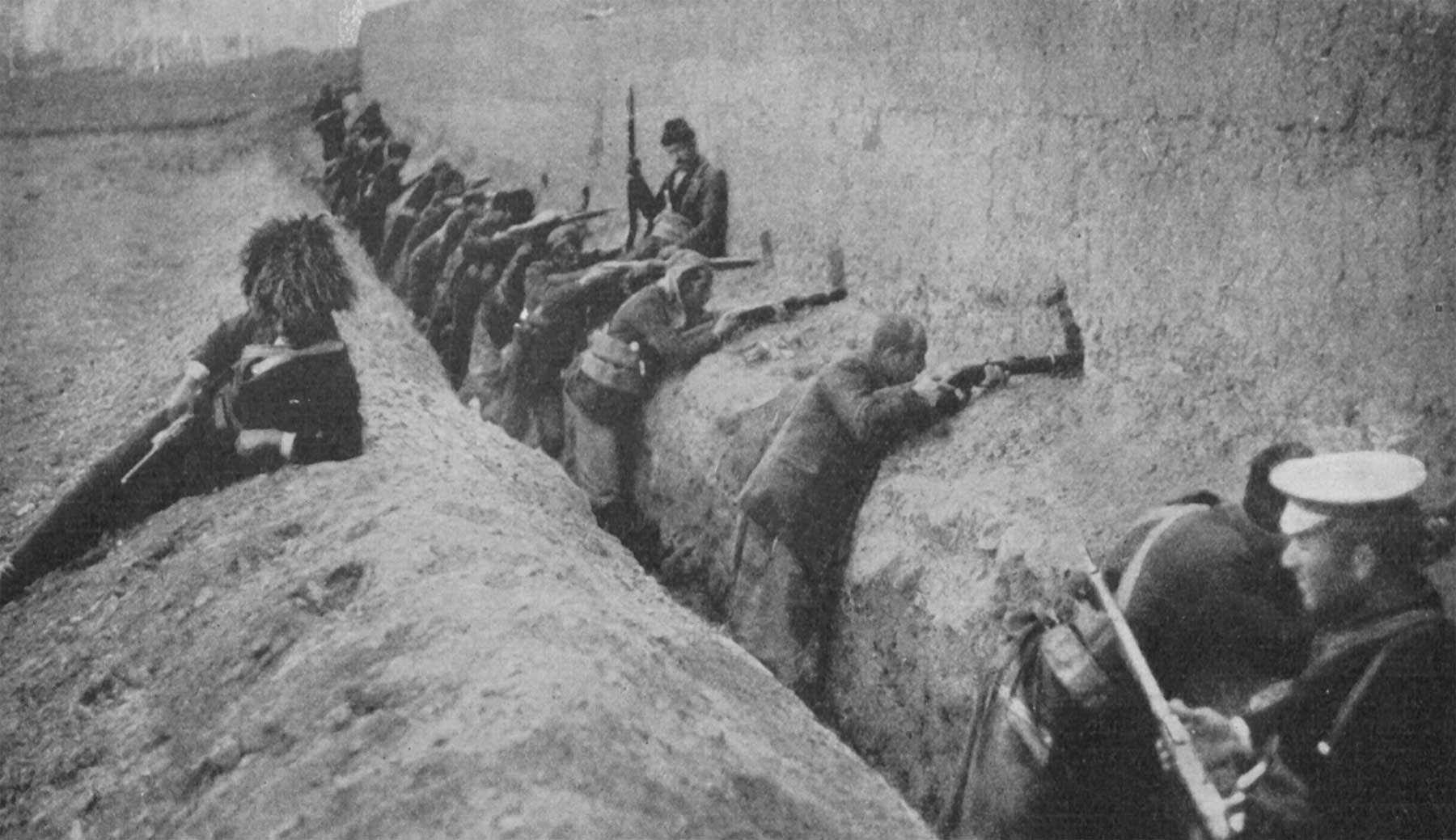
Defending the trenches below the mission compound.

The Armenians were then confined inside a square mile district known as the "Garden City" or Aikesdan in Armenian. This district was then subjugated to a bombardment by the Turkish forces. In order to defend themselves, the Armenians were making their own weapons and ammunition, and were able to manufacture about 2000 rounds of small-arms ammunition a day, from scrap metal and Turkish shrapnel, for the duration of the siege. According to Ussher, the city was left by the time of the siege with only 300 men armed with modern rifles, plus another 1,000 armed with pistols and "antique weapons"; this force would however prove sufficient to keep Cevdet's much larger and better equipped force at bay for several weeks. Nevertheless, the Armenians continued to make an effort to resort to peaceful means. They sent formal declarations to the Turkish soldiers saying that they did not want to fight their "Turkish neighbors". The Armenians also held disciplinary rules to restrain themselves from unlawful conduct and to engage in proper ethics during the siege. Knapp writes:

Some of the rules for their men were: Keep clean; do not drink; tell the truth; do not curse the religion of the enemy. They sent a manifesto to the Turks to the effect that their quarrel was with one man and not with their Turkish neighbors. Valis might come and go, but the two races must continue to live together and they hoped that after Jevdet went there might be peaceful and friendly relations between them. The Turks answered in the same spirit, saying that they were forced to fight. Indeed, a protest against this war was signed by many prominent Turks, but Jevdet would pay no attention to it.

Knapp writes that the Armenians did not attempt to make an offensive. She wrote that the Armenians were "fighting for their homes, their very lives". As previously mentioned, this was also stated by Elizabeth Ussher. Therefore, Knapp asserted that she was more sympathetic towards the Armenians, but had to remain neutral throughout the conflict. The Armenians likewise did not want to drag the Americans into the conflict. They refused to have their wounded soldiers be treated by American physicians at the compound. Instead, they were treated by Ussher at a hospital belonging to the Armenians. On 23 April, Knapp relates that Cevdet Bey sent Ussher a letter threatening to bombard the American compound if they allowed Armenians located nearby to enter the compound. The Americans insisted that they were to remain neutral.

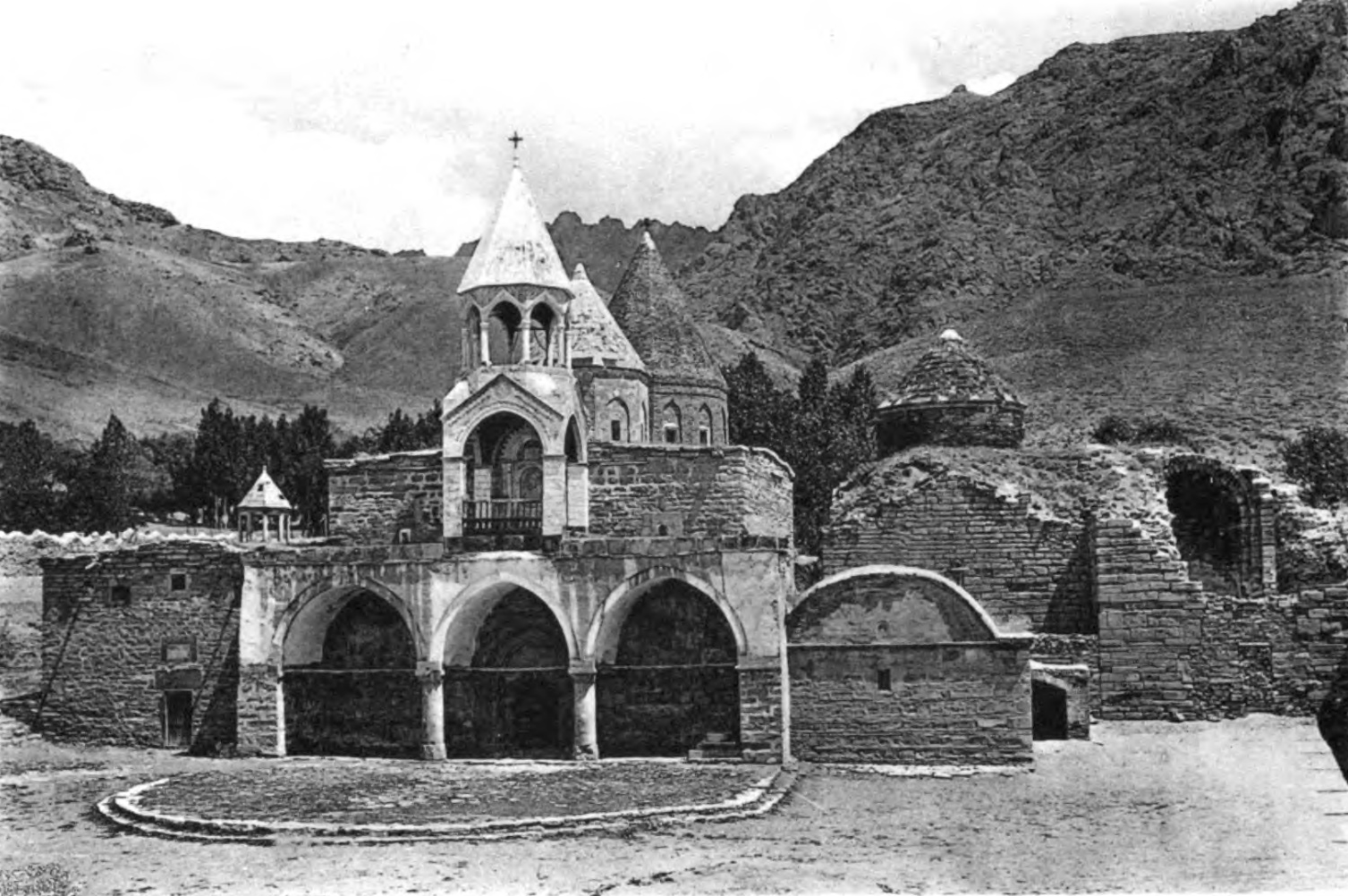
A photograph taken in 1913 of the Varagavank monastery in Van. In May 1915 the Turkish army attacked, burned, and destroyed much of the monastery. Knapp recounted: "On May 8th we saw [the village of Shushantz] in flames and Varak Monastery near by with its priceless ancient manuscripts also went up in smoke."

Knapp writes that Cevdet Bey's soldiers and their Kurdish allies were committing massacres in the countryside. She writes in detail:

While he [Cevdet Bey] was having no work and much fun his soldiers and their wild allies, the Kurds, were sweeping the countryside, massacring men, women, and children and burning their homes. Babies were shot in their mothers' arms, small children were horribly mutilated, women were stripped and beaten.

The refugees of these massacres came to the American compound for help, but Ussher had them treated at another hospital instead. As the siege continued, the Armenians held their positions well after two weeks of fighting. Knapp notes that despite the ongoing bombardment, the Armenians had succeeded in creating a government, though it was relatively ineffectual. On 8 May, the Varagavank Armenian monastery was set on fire and "priceless ancient manuscripts also went up in smoke." The house Knapp was staying in was bombarded heavily by artillery. Although she managed to survive, her bedroom was destroyed.

On 14 May, after almost a month of siege, Turkish forces withdrew due to the advance of Russian forces, who relieved the city a few days later. Knapp states that the city was "awake, singing, and rejoicing all nights." Russian troops had occupied the city on 19 May, and the siege was officially over. With the lifting of the siege, the Armenians were to enjoy a brief ten-week period of self-governance with Aram Manukian as governor.

During this time, relief was provided by the missionaries for the refugees of the conflict. But this period was also marked by the spread of disease, which claimed the lives of several missionaries including Ussher's wife, Elizabeth. Thereafter, advancing Turkish forces brought the city under threat once again. The Russian troops ordered a retreat and thousands of Armenians fled the city rather than fall once more into Turkish hands, fleeing across the border to the relative safety of the Russian Caucasus. Knapp, along with other American missionaries, were evacuated through caravans provided by the Red Cross.

=== Massacres in Bitlis ===
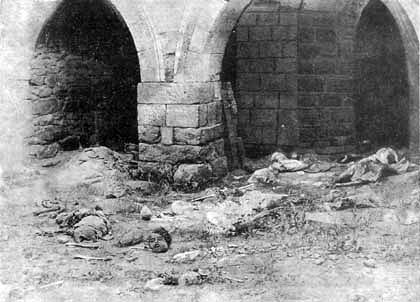
The Armenian monastery of Bitlis in the aftermath of the Armenian genocide with severed heads and corpses in the foreground.

Although Knapp was not in Bitlis during the time of the Armenian genocide, she published narratives from two nurses who were present at the time. In the preface of her book, Knapp states that the accounts were word for word narratives from nurses Grisell Mclaren and Myrtle Shane. She also says that Bitlis was an important place for her since it was her birthplace and her family's residence for several generations.

Miss Mclaren's story begins with the description of the situation in Van where she was a nurse in a hospital. During the siege, Mclaren was told at the request of Cevdet Bey to remain in the hospital during the siege. Meanwhile, she wrote, "We pictured our Armenian friends as being driven from their homes and cruelly massacred." Mclaren did not remain in Van long and was relocated to Bitlis by boat across Lake Van. On their way to Bitlis, Mclaren and the others stopped at the Armenian Cathedral of the Holy Cross located on an island for a meal. However, upon arrival, the priests said that Turkish soldiers visited the monastery a couple of days before and murdered several priests and orphans. The soldiers then ransacked the church, for which Mclaren writes:

In the church we found everything overturned. Vestments and other articles used in the church services were scattered about on the floor, torn, broken, and destroyed. Silver crosses had been carried away, every scrap of silver or gold had been torn off the mitres and other articles; not one thing of value was to be found anywhere.

Mclaren and her company arrived in the village of Tatvan located on the western shore of Lake Van. While in Tatvan, she describes a scene in which about fifty survivors of a massacre appeared before them. The survivors, who were mainly women, told Mclaren that their children had been killed and that their bodies were thrown into Lake Van. They also related how their daughters were kidnapped by local Kurds. When the women decided to complain to the local government of Bitlis, Mclaren remarked that they were not aware that "the affair had been ordered by the government."

Mclaren remained in the village as local Kurds continued to engage in massacre throughout the countryside. This was followed by the mass arrests of Armenian men aged ten years and above on June 22. On June 25, the ongoing massacres were further assisted by Cevdet Bey who arrived in Bitlis from Van accompanied with 8,000 reinforcement troops known as "human butchers." Those arrested were then escorted out of the city and killed using axes and shovels. Mclaren related that those who resisted arrest were killed and their houses were burned. According to historian Raymond Kévorkian, it took two weeks for the Armenian male population of Bitlis to be eliminated. Soon after the arrests, the deportation of women and children began on 29 June. Mclaren and other American colleagues tried to save young girls under their care from deportation by appealing to the Vali. The Vali then refused and stated that "an order had come from Constantinople that not an Armenian should remain in Bitlis." Meanwhile, as Mclaren relates, "the police seemed to have gone mad in their thirst for Armenian blood." She notes that the gendarmes were now killing the remaining women and children of Bitlis. She describes in detail:

The screams of women and children could be heard at almost any time during the day. The cries that rang out through the darkness of the night were even more heartrending.

After occupying Van, the Russian army approached Bitlis in mid July. With the arrival of the Russian army, the Muslim inhabitants of Bitlis fled, effectively ending the massacres. However, by July 15 and prior to the arrival of the Russian army, the elimination of the Armenian population of Bitlis was already "virtually complete". After a short stay, the Russian army retreated on July 24 and Turkish forces reestablished their presence in Bitlis. Mclaren and Shane remained in Bitlis until 30 November 1915, when they were escorted out of Bitlis. Along the way, they both witnessed mutilated bodies and corpses as a result of other massacres and encountered many villages destroyed by fire.

In October 1917, Grisell Mclaren and Myrtle Shane wrote about their experiences in Bitlis during the war. In 1919, the accounts were then published in Knapp's The Tragedy of Bitlis.

== Later life ==
When Grace Knapp returned to the United States, she relocated to New York City where she began to work as a staff writer for the American Committee for Armenian and Syrian Relief (ACASR; now known as the Near East Foundation) from 1918 to 1923. The ACASR was a relief organization in charge of assisting the victims and survivors of the Armenian and Assyrian genocide. After relocating to Boston, Massachusetts, Knapp continued working as an editor for the American Board of Commissioners for Foreign Missions from 1923 to 1940. She had published her experiences while working in the Ottoman Empire in several books entitled "The mission at Van in Turkey in war time" (1916) and "The Tragedy of Bitlis" (1917), the latter being a collection of eyewitness accounts as noted above. Knapp has donated her personal photographs, letters, and documents related to her experiences in Bitlis, Erzerum, and Van to the Mount Holyoke College Archives & Special Collections.

In addition to having published eyewitness accounts, she has also written a pamphlet of poems.

On 14 March 1953, Grace Knapp died in Auburndale, Massachusetts at the age of 82.
