= Defense of Van (1915) =

Armed resistance of the Armenian population of Van against the Armenian genocide

Coordinates: 38.4942°N 43.3800°E

- Part of the Caucasus campaign of World War I and the Armenian genocide
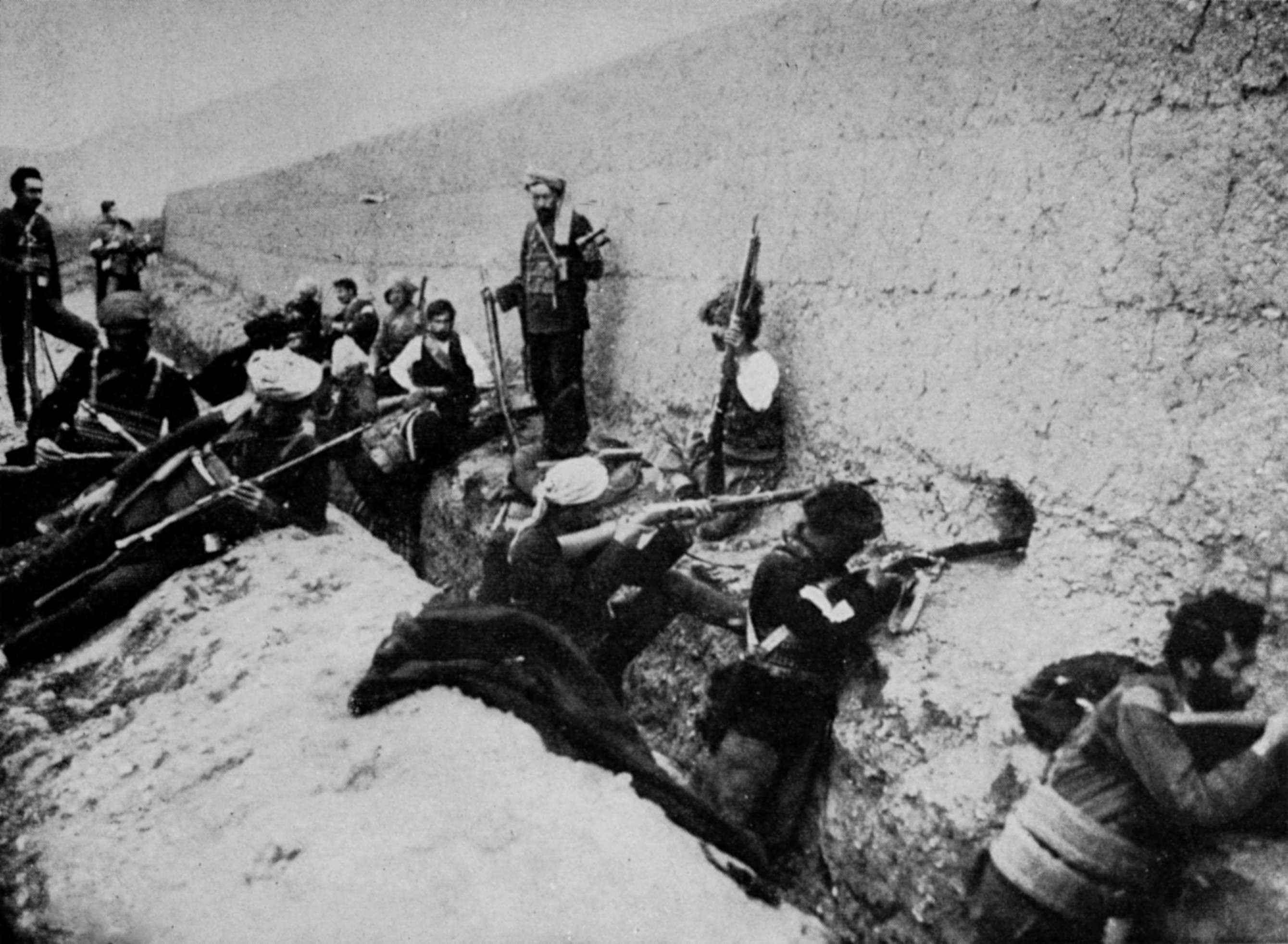
- Armenian fighters holding a defense line against Ottoman forces in the walled city of Van, May 1915.
Date	19 April – 17 May 1915
Location	Van, Ottoman Empire
Result	Russo-Armenian victory

Belligerents
Ottoman Empire	Armenian fedayi Russian Empire

Commanders and leaders
Djevdet Bey; Halil Bey; Köprülü Kâzım Bey; Rafael de Nogales	Nikolai Yudenich; Pyotr Oganovsky; Aram Manukian

Strength
5,000	1,300–6,000

Casualties and losses
Unknown but heavy 2,000 captured, 30 guns	Unknown
- 55,000 Armenian civilians massacred

The defense of Van (Armenian: Վանի հերոսամարտ, romanized: Vani herosamart) and in Russian Van operation (Russian: Ванская операция, romanized: Vanskaya operatsia) was the armed resistance of the Armenian population of Van and Russian army against the Ottoman Empire's attempts to massacre the Ottoman Armenian population of the Van Vilayet in the 1915 Armenian genocide. Several contemporaneous observers and later historians have concluded that the Ottoman government deliberately instigated an armed Armenian resistance in the city and then used this insurgency as the main pretext to justify beginning the deportation and slaughter of Armenians throughout the empire. Witness reports agree that the Armenian posture at Van was defensive and an act of resistance to massacre. The self-defense action is frequently cited in Armenian genocide denial literature; it has become "the alpha and omega of the plea of 'military necessity'" to excuse the genocide and portray the persecution of Armenians as justified.

== Background ==
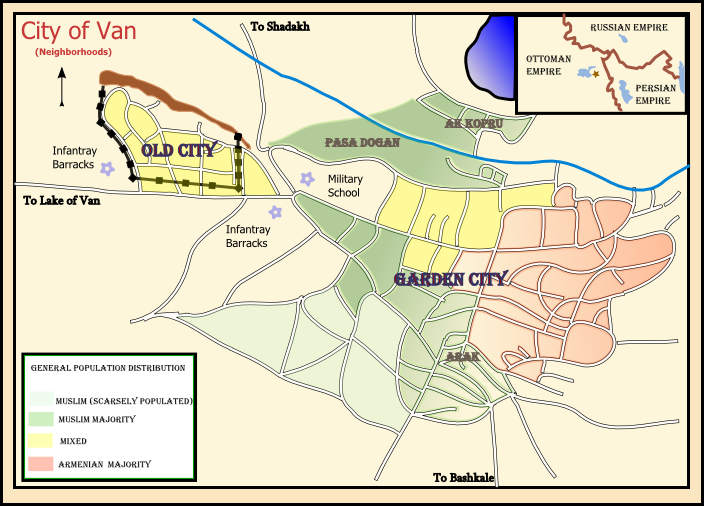
Van City Centrum

During the late Ottoman period, Van was an important center of Armenian cultural, social, and economic life. Khrimian Hayrik established a printing press in Van, and thereafter launched Vaspurakan Ardzvi (Eagle of Vaspourakan), which was the first periodical publication in Armenia. In 1885, the Armenakan party was established in the city of Van. Soon after, the Hnchak and Dashnak parties, whose missions were the overthrow of the Ottoman rule in Eastern Anatolia (Six Vilayets), established branches in the city.

Throughout 1895–96 Armenians in the Ottoman Empire suffered a wave of violence commonly known as the Hamidian massacres. While Van largely avoided the massacres in 1895, the Ottomans sent a military expedition in June 1896. The Armenians of Van were initially able to defend themselves, but upon agreeing to disarm in exchange for safety, massacres continued, ending in the deaths of over 20,000 Armenians.

The pre-war (World War I) demographic statistics of the Van Province, Ottoman Empire had different values based on different sources. In 1914, Armenians lived on the shores of Lake Van. The major Armenian inhabited localities were the city of Van (consisting of three sub-sections which were Havasor (Gürpınar), Timar (Gedikbulak) and Archak (Erçek)). Armenians also lived in the district of Erciş (Artchesh, Akants) which was in the northern part of the province, as well as the districts of Çatak (Shatakh), Başkale (Bashkaleh) and Bahçesaray (Moks) in the southern part of the province. In an 1890 census, there were 79,998 Armenians living in the province. That same census showed the percentage Armenian population located in the city of Van to be 35%, and the district Armenian populations to be 64% in Ercis, 37% in Catak, 18% in Bashkale, and 48% in Bahcesaray. The 1912 local Patriarch statistic stated that the Armenian population was 110,000. The original 1914 Ottoman census stated that Armenian population was 67,797 and Muslim population was 179,422. However, the 1914 official census was challenged both on Armenian and Muslim population sizes. It was found that the original 1914 Ottoman statistics claimed to be under-representative for the children, and the corrected values for the Van province were stated as 313,000 Muslim, 130,000 Armenian (25%), and approximately 65,000 Syrian, Chaldean, Nestorian and others. Population estimates for the city of Van proved more difficult to analyze. Extensive population movements in and around the city happened due to the deterioration of the economic and political situation before World War I. Ottoman population count at the time recorded 79,000 Muslims and 34,000 Armenians in the city of Van, including the immediate surrounding areas. The city of Van's Armenian population was estimated to be about 30,000 people in the fall of 1914.

Geographic and Demographic maps of the Van Province, Ottoman Empire

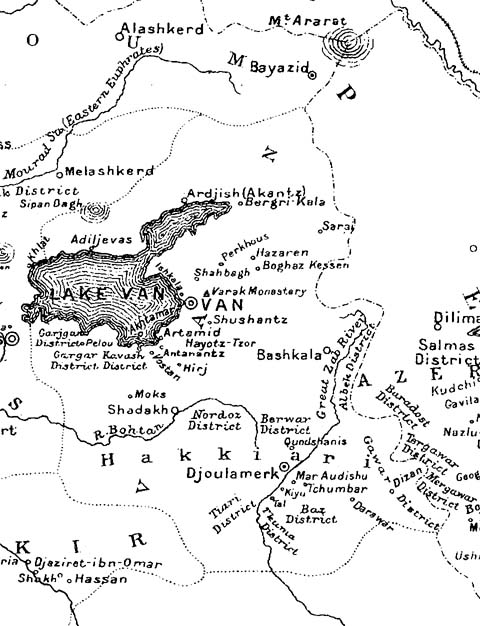
Settlements in Van Vilayet

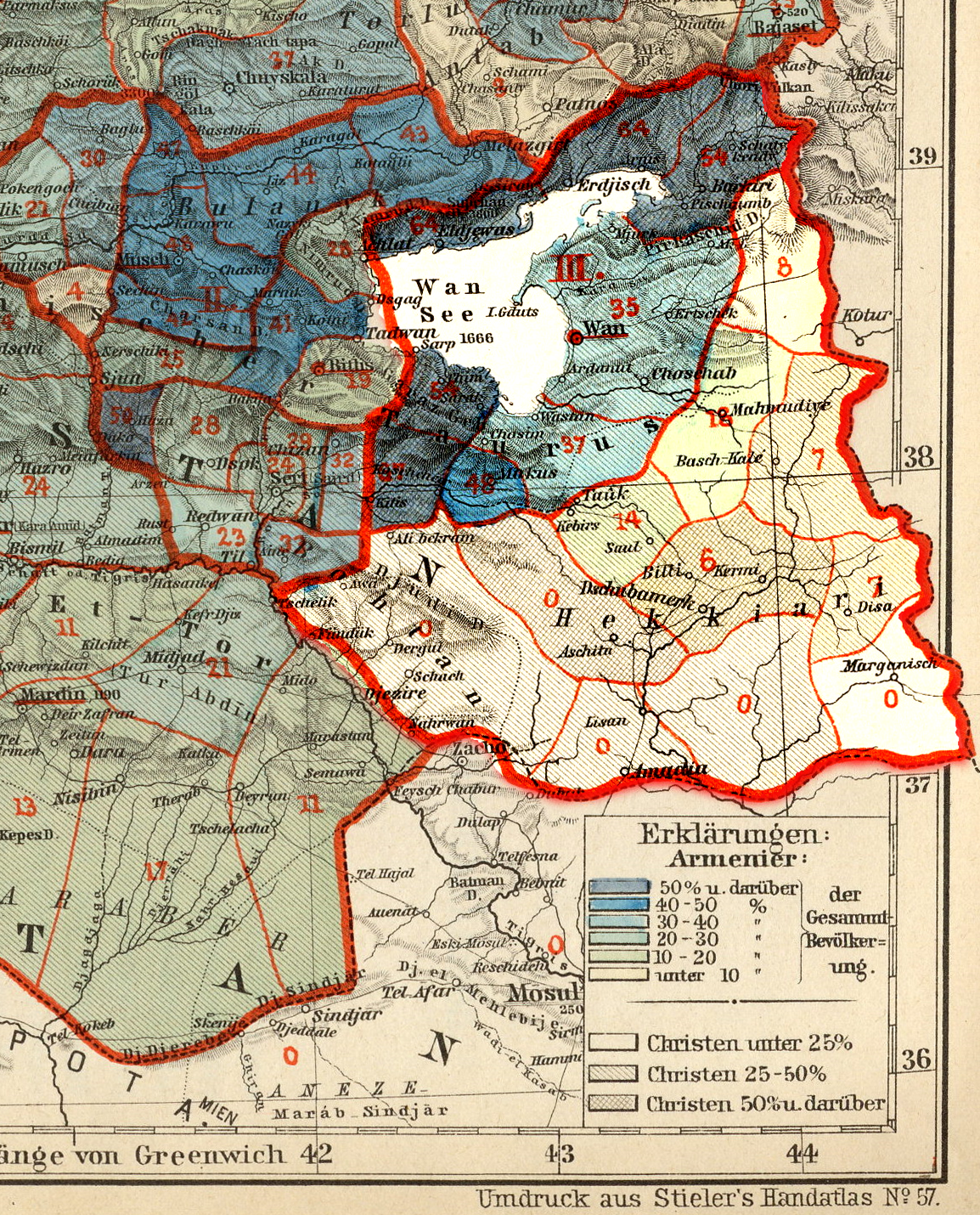
1896, Armenian population ratios in the districts

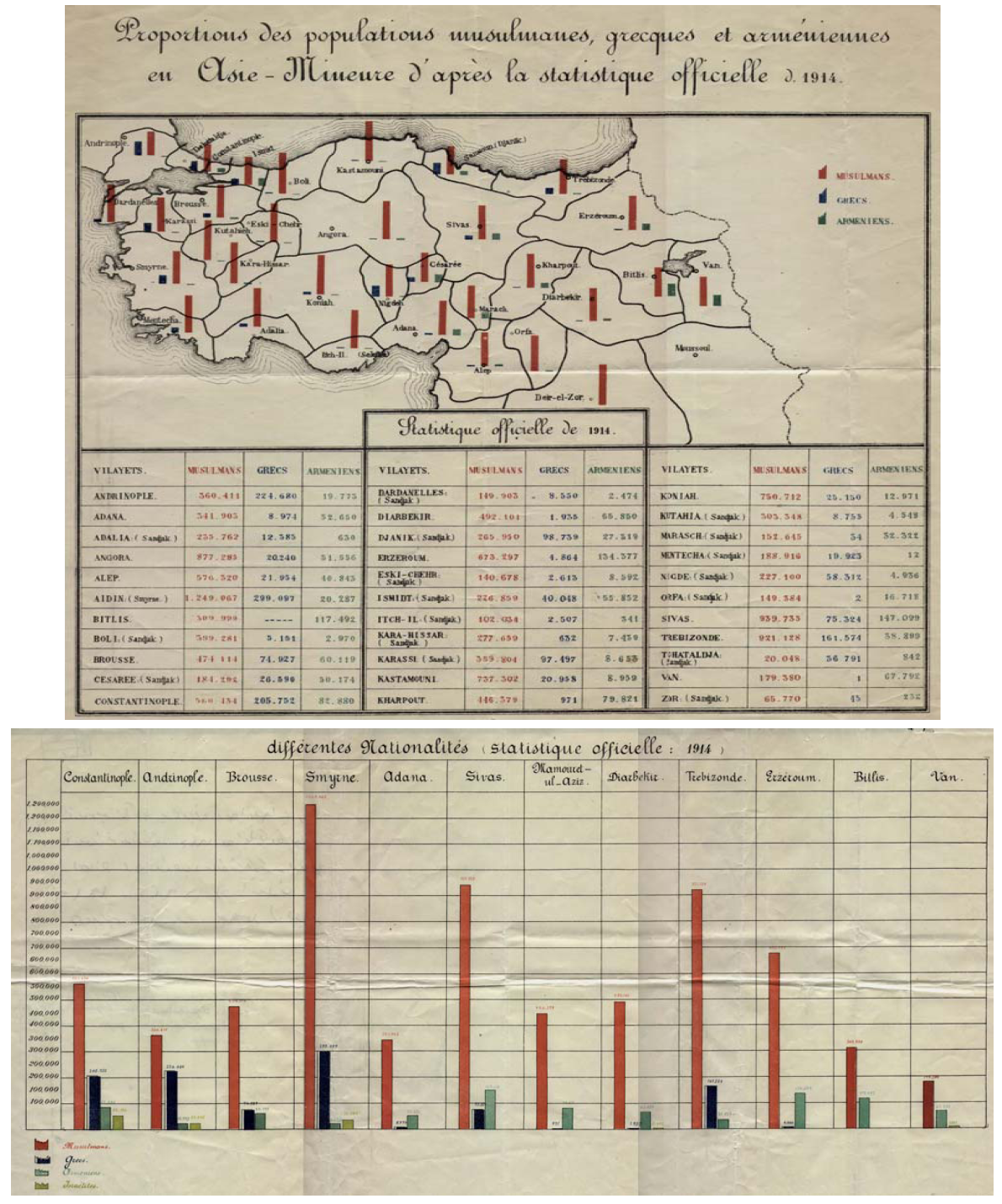
1914, Ottoman Census

Population Statistics of Van Province from different sources
Administrative Units	Total	Gender		Islam		Gr Total	Greek		Gr Total	Armenian		Gr Total	Jew		Nasturi		Yezidi		Keldani		Gr Total
		Male	Female	Male	Female		Male	Female		Male	Female		Male	Female	Male	Female	Male	Female	Male	Female	
Center (Van City)	79736	44492	35244	24996	20123					19035	14754	42%									
Ercis	35406	19451	15955	14627	12696					4824	3259	23%			461	367					
Catak	23717	6939	5778	4588	3544					2193	2099	18%							158	135	
Adilcevaz	15669	8753	6916	6178	4644					2577	2272	31%									
Gevas	28643	16655	11988	10377	7786					6318	4202	37%									
SubTotal	172171	96290	75881	60724	48,793					34947	26586	36%			461	367			158	135	
Center (hakkari)	27680	15057	12623	11953	9895		1			1829	1632	13%	424	412	850	684					
Colemerik	9004	4888	4116	4009	3441					160	136	3%			716	539					
Mahmudi	12959	7673	5286	6239	3991					276	257	4%					736	630	422	413	
Semdinan	11740	5857	5883	4919	4954							0%	127	147	811	782					
Gevar	16881	9852	7029	7413	5358					609	350	6%	147	126	1683	1185					
Hosab	8706	4837	3869	4201	3490					636	379	12%									
SubTotal	86970	48164	38806	38,734	31129		1			3510	2749	7%	698	685	4063	3200	736	630	422	413	
	270141	144454	114687	99500	79922	⇓	1	0	⇓	38457	29340	⇓	698	685	4521	3557	736	630	580	548	⇓
(Original) Ottoman Census 1914	270,141					179,422			1			67,797									11,955
(Corrected) Ottoman Census 1914	509,000					313,322						131,000									62,400
Armenian Patriarch (1913–14)												110,897									
Ottoman Census 1890	430,000			Kurds: 210,000; Turkic: 30,500; Total Muslim: 240,500						Apostolic: 79,000; Catholic:708; Protestant: 290; Total Armen:79,998			5,000		40,000 (Orthodox: 52,000) Total Syrian: 92,000		5,400		6,000		109,502
Ottoman Census 1862	418,700			Sancak Van: 90,100; Sancak Hakkari: 119,000; Total Muslim: 209,100			Sancak Van: 95,100 Sancak Hakkari: 114,500 Total Christian: 209,600														

== Prelude: Caucasian campaign ==
On 30 October 1914, after an exchange of fire during the pursuit of Goeben and Breslau, the Ottoman Empire entered World War I. The province of Van was positioned between Persia and the Caucasus, and the most accessible routes that linked Persia, Russia, Mesopotamia and Anatolia lay through this province. giving Van high strategic value as a consequence of its location.

The first engagement of the Caucasus Campaign took place on 2 November 1914 with the Bergmann Offensive. The Russians collected victories along the Kara Kilise (renamed Karaköse in November 1919, present day Ağrı) – Beyazit (Doğubayazıt) line. Beyazit was located in the north of the Province of Van, and Armenian volunteers provided aid as auxiliary forces to Russian regiments while capturing these regions.

During December 1914, Nicholas II of Russia visited the Caucasian front. In the presence of the head of the Armenian Church and alongside Alexander Khatisyan president of the Armenian National Bureau in Tiflis, Nicholas II stated: "Armenians from all countries are hurrying to enter the ranks of the glorious Russian Army, and with their blood, to serve the victory of the Russian Army... Let the Russian flag wave freely over the Dardanelles and the Bosporus, let all the peoples (Christians) remaining under the Turkish yoke receive freedom through your will. Let the Armenian people of Turkey, who have suffered for the faith of Christ, receive resurrection for a new and free life...". Ottoman War Minister Enver Pasha wanted to encircle the Russian forces between Sarikamish and Ardahan. The Battle of Sarikamish (29 December 1914 – 4 January 1915) was a disastrous defeat for Enver Pasha. For their role in this success, the Armenian volunteers received credit as natives of the region, well adjusted to the climate, familiar with every road and mountain path, and motivated to wage fierce and resolute combat. The Armenian volunteers were small, mobile units, well adapted to semi-guerrilla warfare. They worked efficiently as scouts, though they also took active roles in many conventional engagements. Armenian volunteers challenged the Ottoman operations during critical times: "the delay they caused, enabled the Russian Caucasus Army to concentrate sufficient force around Sarikamish". After he returned to Constantinople, Enver blamed his defeat on Armenians living in the region, for actively siding with Russia.

On 11 December 1914 Ottoman preparations for their Persian Campaign began with Enver Pasha's order to form a provisional force that would be channeled into the planned theatre using the roads in Van Province. Whilst Turkish preparations were underway, the Russians transferred Armenian General Tovmas Nazarbekian to the Russian-occupied Persian Azerbaijan. Theodore G. Chernozubov's Persian Cossack Brigade had been operationally deployed in Persia since 1906. During this period, the Ottoman authorities distributed 24,000 rifles to Kurds in Persia and the Van province.

The Ottoman 1st Expeditionary Force was assigned to Chief of Intelligence of the Ottoman General Headquarters, Staff Lieutenant Colonel Kâzim Karabekir Bey. The 5th Expeditionary Force was assigned to Staff Lieutenant Colonel Halil Bey, who was the uncle of Enver Pasha and would defeat the British at Kut al Amara on 29 April 1916.

The 1st Expeditionary Force was structurally self-sufficient, capable of independent operations, supplemented with the 7th and 9th Infantry Regiments, a cavalry detachment, a field hospital, a transportation unit, an intelligence section, a mountain howitzer battalion with two batteries, a telegraph section, a field battery, an equipment repair battalion, a replacement depot and transportation assets. On 10 January 1915, while the 1st Expeditionary Force was on its way to Persian Azerbaijan, the original plan was scrapped. Due to Turkish losses suffered at the disastrous battle of Sarikamish, the 1st Expeditionary Force found itself assigned to the 3rd Army. On 11 January 1915 the 5th Expeditionary Force was ordered north to Erzurum and eleven days later the 1st Expeditionary Force was ordered there as well. The Van Gendarmerie Regiment (police force) under the command of Staff Major Köprülü Kâzım Bey (Özalp), who would become the Minister of National Defence and Speaker of Grand National Assembly of Turkey, was the only force available to the Persian frontier. Earlier, on 14 December 1914, Van Mobile Gendarmerie Division had assumed the role of securing the road to Persia through the Qotur valley (Qotur Pass). This paramilitary formation was lightly equipped with artillery and machine guns, being primarily suited for internal security functions rather than for the invasion of a neighboring country.

In addition to these military activities, during the period of 1914–1915 American and German missionaries present in the area reported occurrences of massacres of the Armenian population. Such massacres intensified immediately prior to the uprising. According to one source, all of the 52 Armenian villages near Beyazit and Eleşkirt were raided, pillaged and destroyed by the Hamidiye cavalry regiments.

== Forces ==
After the disastrous depletion of the 3rd Army in the Battle of Sarikamish, the gendarmerie, originally charged with police duties among civilian populations, was transferred to the 3rd Army in an attempt to restore combat effectiveness of the Ottoman Army's operational military forces. On 24 February 1915, the Ottomans were forced to send the Harput, Diyarbakir, and Bitlis gendarmerie units to the city of Van. There were 52,000 Ottoman troops in the Caucasus war zone during this period, with 75% located at the northern war zone, beyond the province of Van. The Ottoman units in the Van province consisted of Van Gendarmerie subdivisions that remained under the control of the Governor. The Van Gendarmerie Division also contained the artillery unit under Rafael de Nogale. The 36th Infantry Division was assembled from Mesopotamia under orders to control the southern part, near Lake Van. The 1st Expeditory Force held the front to the south of Lake Van.

The 3 Army units in Van province (4 June)
Van Gendarmerie Division	2,500
36th Infantry Division	5,400
1st Expeditionary Force	7,500
Bagdat Regiment	560
Total	15,960

One battalion, dubbed "the butcher battalion (Turkish: kasab taburu)" numbered some 5,000 men.

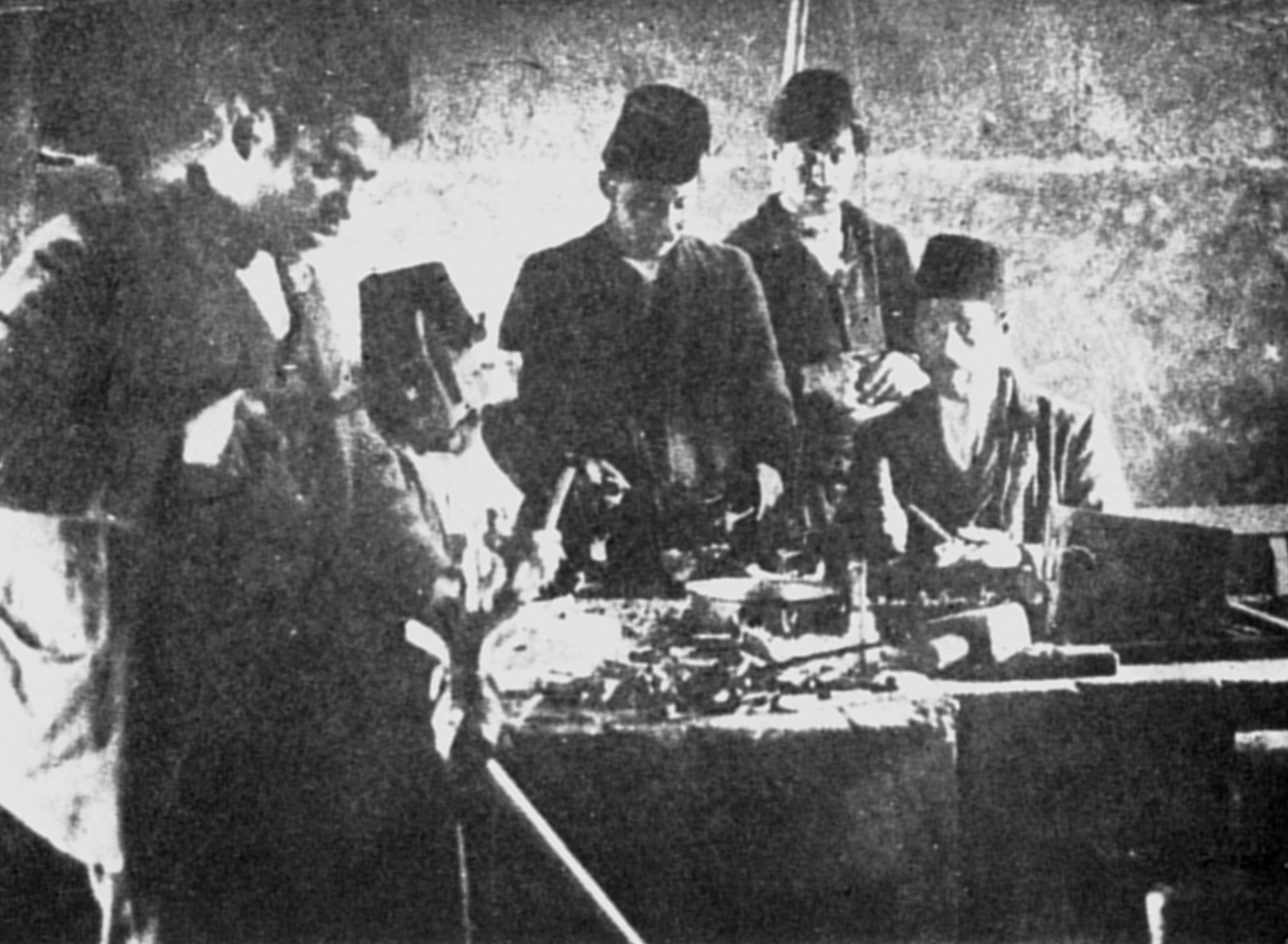
From Ussher, Armenians making cartridges by hand

The Armenian population in the city had taken measures as well. The city management had established a unified authority ("The Military Defense Authority") consisting of Armenak Ekarian, Aram Manukian, Kaytsak Arakel, Bulgaratsi Gregory, Gabriel Semerjian, Hrant Galikian and Panos Terlemezian. Support services were set up and distribution of food, medical aid, and arms shop (an established manufacture of gunpowder and arms that was capable of casting two guns), were organized. The Women's Union was founded at this time, mainly engaged in manufacturing clothing for combatants. In the face of imminent danger, representatives of various Armenian political parties (Ramkavar, Dashnaks) rallied together. The Van defenders numbered no more than 1500 combatants, who had only 505 rifles and 750 Mauser pistols and a small supply of ammunition. The Military Defense Authority issued orders to use ammunition with extra caution. The Aykesdan neighborhood was divided into 7 sectors of defense, with 79 distinct positions. Researcher Thomas De Waal states that "it has been called both a rebellion and a heroic act of resistance by Armenians against a government that intended to kill them" and "it had elements of both".

Forces

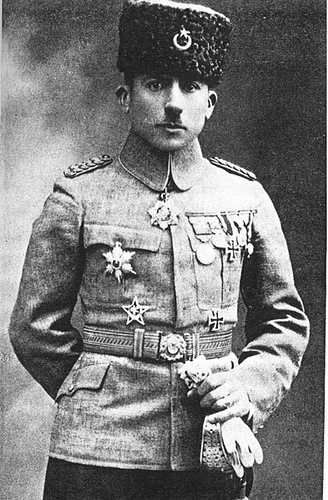
Rafael de Nogales Méndez, a Venezuelan officer who served in the Ottoman army, participated in the siege of Van and after the war wrote his memoirs which include the battle and its aftermath.

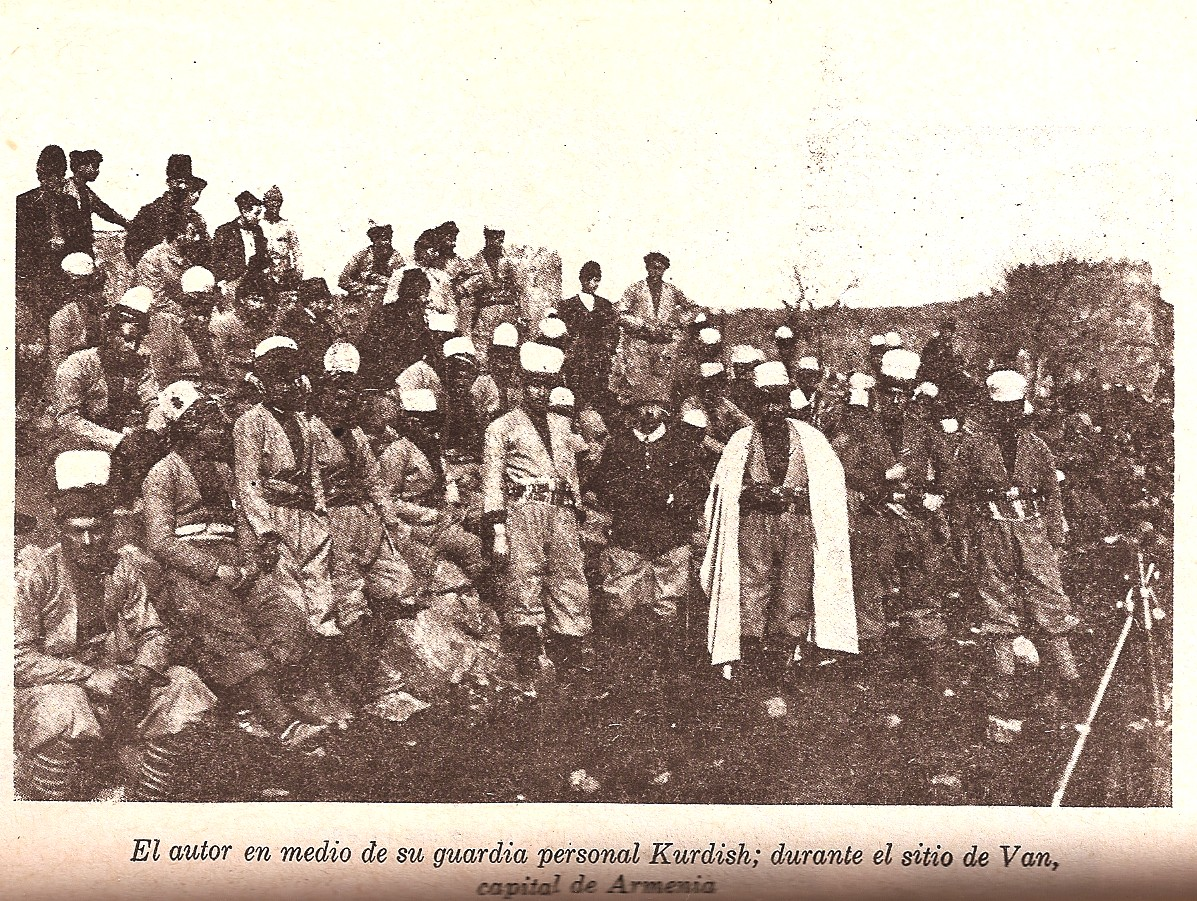
Rafael de Nogales Méndez with his Kurdish guard during the siege of Van.

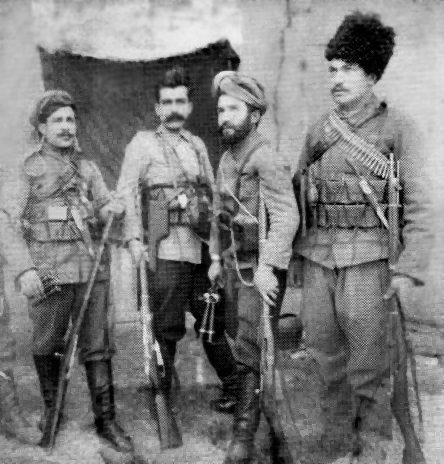
The ARF leaders from left to right: Harutyun, Aram Manukian, Ishkhan and Sogho

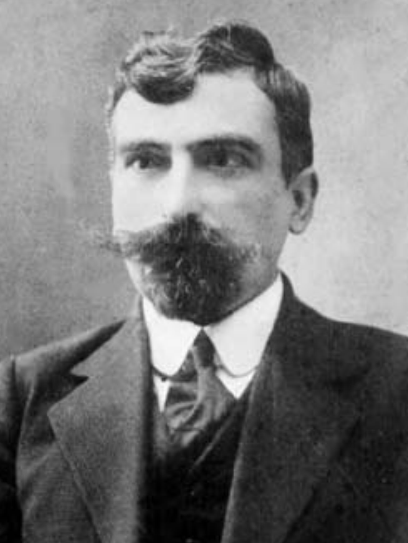
Aram Manukian had been the leader throughout the conflicts. He was made governor of the province

== Timeline ==
The most important change during the defense of Van was the transfer of Governor Hasan Tahsin Pasha to Erzurum and his replacement with Djevdet Bey. Djevdet Bey was the brother-in-law of Enver Pasha, and was accompanied by Rafael de Nogales Méndez. De Nogales was assigned with the permission of the 3rd Army's commanding German officer to oversee the Ottoman Gendarmerie units under the new governor. The Armenian leaders were Aram Manukian, the regional party leader of Armenian Revolutionary Federation (ARF), Armenak Yekarian from the ranks of Armenakans, Nikoghayos Poghos Mikaelian (Ishkhan), a member of the ARF, and Arshak Vramian, he deputy of the Ottoman Parliament from Van. Vramian was also an old classmate of Djevdet's.

Tahsin wrote to Talat Pasha on 13 May 1915:

There would have been no revolt at Van if we had not ourselves created [it], with our own hands, by using force, this impossible situation from which we are incapable of extricating ourselves, and also the difficult position in which we have put the army on the eastern front.

=== Djevdet's reign ===
During July 1914, Arshak Vramian, the deputy of the Van province, attended the negotiations with the Committee of Union and Progress (CUP) as a liaison for the Armenian congress at Erzurum. The public conclusion of this congress was "Ostensibly conducted to peacefully advance Armenian demands by legitimate means". Armenian sources say that local Armenian leaders Aram Manukian, Arshak Vramian, Nikoghayos Poghos Mikaelian (Ishkhan), and Armenak Yekaryan told the Armenians of Van to remain loyal to the Ottoman government and not to antagonize it. The Turkish CUP regarded the Armenian congress as a seedbed for establishing the decision for the Turkish feared Armenian insurrection. Edward J. Erickson concluded that after this meeting, the CUP was convinced of strong Armenian-Russian links, with Erickson surmising that these links included detailed plans for the detachment of the region from the Ottoman Empire. Later, in September 1914, Turkish military operations, which included the search for arms, ammunition and operational documents, began. On 20 October 1914, the Turkish 4th Reserve Cavalry Regiment, patrolling Hasankale, reportedly discovered rifles hidden in Armenian homes. During this period, large numbers of Armenians with weapons were moving into Mush, Bitlis, and Van. Erickson concluded that "before the war began, indicators of potentially violent intent accumulated, as the authorities found bombs and weapons hidden in Armenian homes". On the other hand, Nogales witnessed Ottoman army units photographing their own weapons and merely claiming that they had been found in Armenian houses and churches.

As early as 5 November 1914, a major attack by the Russians on the 3rd Army's defensive lines in the Van Province was under way. This offensive complicated Turkish perceptions of Armenian intentions. The Russians began larger operations toward Saray and Van by 19 November. In November, the Turkish Gendarmerie units of the provincial security apparatus of the Governors changed hands, reverting to Turkish military command. This change included the units commanded by the governor of Van. The Van Gendarmerie and Van reserve cavalry divisions were assigned to the Third Army. The Van Gendarmerie Division was placed under the command of Major Ferid, while Governor Djevdet kept only a small contingent.

During December 1914, Djevdet Bey issued orders to secure the west of the province of Van, as Ottoman forces moved to start the Persian Campaign. CUP negotiators were sent to Erzurum and Van before Djevdet Bey left the city. These negotiators and Djevdet Bey wanted to test the loyalty of the Van Armenians. After their first attempt with the Armenian Congress, they wanted to see once again if they would agree to stage an uprising in Russian Armenia. Djevdet demanded that Armenians furnish 4,000 volunteers, according to conscription in the Ottoman Empire. The Armenians refused to do this. Clarence Ussher states that "it was clear that Djevdet's goals were to massacre the able bodied men of Van so as there would be no defenders, as he had done in the villages under the pretexts of arms searches, searches that had turned into massacres. The Armenians, parlaying to gain time, offered to furnish five hundred soldiers and to pay exemption money for the rest." The Armenian conscription became an issue again when Djevdet returned to the city in April, during the Armenian Easter of 1915. Djevdet asked one more time for the Armenians to furnish conscripts to be used for the establishment of Ottoman fortifications. Ussher would say "the Armenians who had practically decided to give the Vali [Jevdet] the four thousand men he had demanded, now dared not do so for they felt certain he intended to put the four thousand to death." Djevdet did not receive any Armenian soldiers from the city of Van after either requests.

Persian Azerbaijan had a large Christian population, mostly Armenian and Assyrian. Many of them fled with the retreating Russian army in a winter trek to the Russian border town of Julfa. Those that remained endured a period of looting and massacre; many villages were plundered and destroyed. After an unsuccessful campaign led by Djevdet Bey to capture Khoi, 160 kilometres (99 miles) north-west of Tabriz, Djevdet ordered the killing of about 800 people—mostly old men, women and children—in the Salmas district (to the north-east of Lake Urmia) in early March.

On 25 February 1915, the 3rd Army and the all Gendarmerie commands, including the Van Gendarmerie, received Directive 8682, titled "Increased Security Precautions". This directive noted increased dissident Armenian activity in Bitlis, Aleppo, Dortyol and Kayseri, and identified Russian and French influence and activities in these areas. The Operations Division directed that the Third and the Fourth Armies increase their surveillance and security measures. To contrast the directive, Felix Guse, commander in chief of the 3rd Army, wrote that there was no proof that the Armenians had planned or had any intentions of mounting a general uprising.

On 23 March 1915, the 1st Expeditionary Force arrived in the vicinity of the city of Van and later stayed to the south of Van during the conflicts.

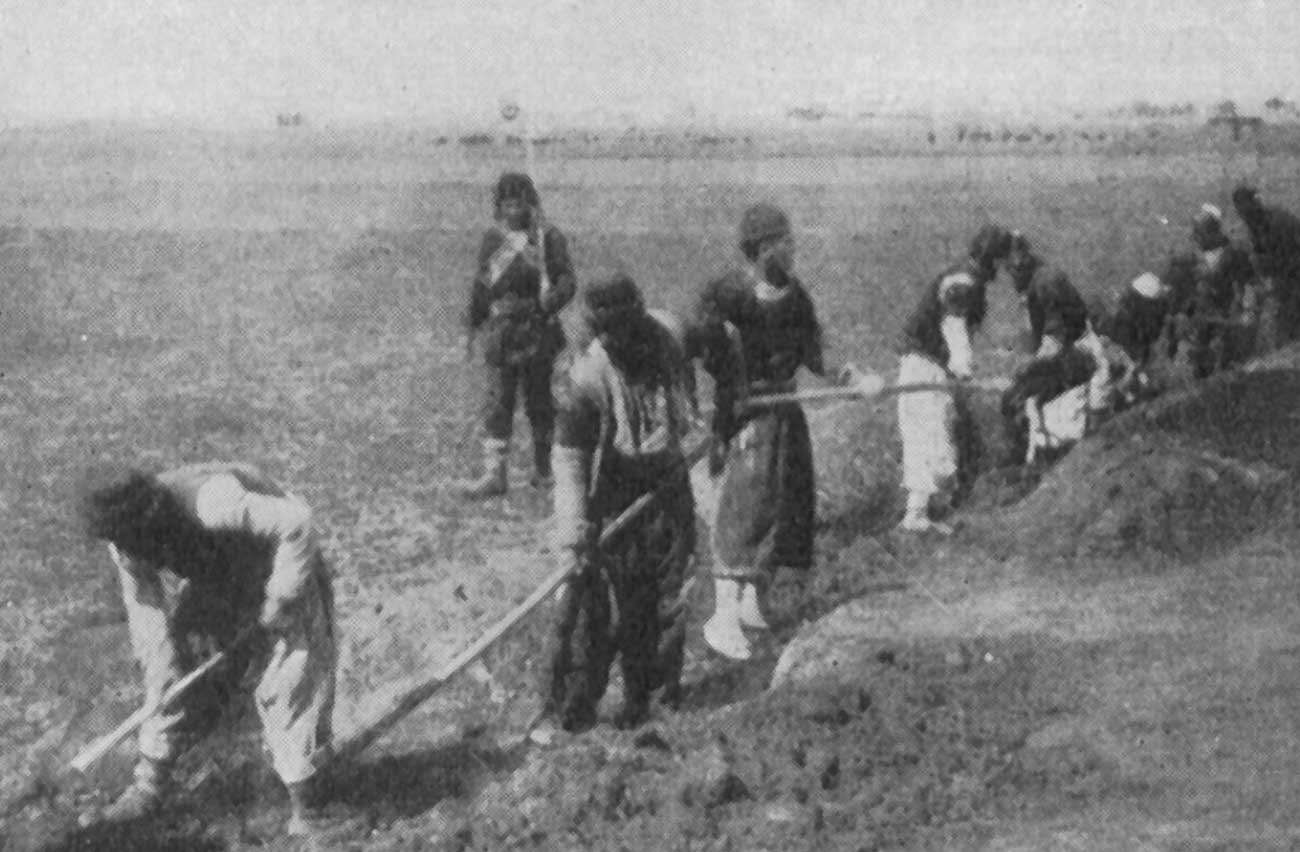
Armenians digging trenches

=== Early stages ===
Prior to these events, killings of Armenian males in the Van region were reported by neutral observers.

Djevdet's extremism towards Armenians was more open: "a man of dangerously unpredictable moods, friendly one moment, ferociously hostile the next, capable of treacherous brutality", he had been nicknamed "Nalband Bey" (Lord Blacksmith) after atrocities committed at Başkale in which he had nailed horseshoes onto his victims' feet.

Upon returning to Van, Djevdet "instigated a reign of terror in the outlying villages of the province on the pretext of searching for arms." In the process, the Ottoman gendarmeries killed many Armenians. The Armenian leaders of Van in the meanwhile implored the people to endure in silence. "Better," they said, "that some villages be burned and destroyed unavenged than give the slightest pretext to the Moslems for a general massacre.". However, there were also reports at the same time of Turks lynching Kurdish soldiers responsible for particularly harsh atrocities.

Some of the rules for [the Armenian defenders of Van] were: 'Keep clean; do not drink; tell the truth; do not curse the religion of the enemy.

During this time, the massacres, under the pretext of an arms search, continued. Later, Armenians attacked an Ottoman patrol, to Djevdet's anger. Alarmed, Armenians in Van requested Dr. Clarence Ussher, a missionary and representative of the United States, to mediate between them and Djevdet. Djevdet attempted to violate the diplomatic immunity of Ussher's compound by trying to garrison 50 Ottoman soldiers inside. It became clear to Ussher that mediation attempts would be futile. However, reports at the time were also showing that the Armenians had begun to gather volunteers for an organized defense.

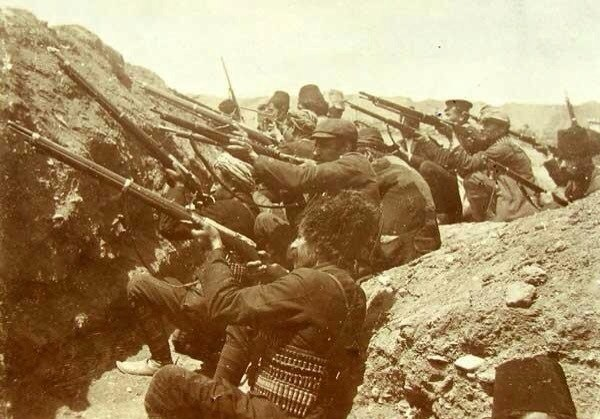
Armenians in the trenches

On 15 April, Armenians had mustered a force at Erciş (Ardjish) by Gendarmerie. Earlier, the tax collectors, accompanied by gendarmeries, went to north Van province to count the sheep which dictated the villagers' tax rates. Erciş was an administrative unit with 80 Armenian villages at north of Van. The tax collector gave the Sultan's recital of order regarding the calculation of tax values. Disagreement ensued between the villagers and the tax collector. The disagreement turned to conflict and extended to the gendarmerie unit in Banat, reaching other centers from there. Violence in the countryside reached a peak on 19 April, where 2,500 males in Erciş killed in a single day.

Initial position

On 17 April, Djevdet ordered his battalions to annihilate Shatakh. The ill-disciplined force instead attacked Armenian villages located nearer to Van. On the same day, Arshak Vramian was arrested. A schoolmaster was also arrested in Shadakh in mid-April. There had been a local demonstration in his favor. Several prominent Armenians, led by Nikoghayos Poghos Mikaelian (Ishkhan), went to this town at the request of Djevdet. Nikoghayos Poghos Mikaelian and other prominent Armenians were stopped midway at Hirj and murdered on 17 April. Among the three leaders of the ARF only Aram Manukian escaped. Djevdet also took action against the leaders of the ARF in Van. For the resistance, this was a sign that the city was not safe. Djevdet was believed to have thought that, by killing leaders of the Armenian parties, he would destroy the cohesion of the resistance. The minister of interior Mehmed Talat Bey with his order on 24 April (known by the Armenians as the Red Sunday) requested the arrest of the leaders of Armenian community in the Ottoman capital and other centers. They were held in two holding centers near Ankara. Arshak Vramian was sent to the capital with a guard, and was reported to have been killed along the way.

=== City under siege, 20 April ===
On 20 April, the Ottoman soldiers seized an Armenian woman who wanted to enter the city. Two Armenian men that came to help were shot dead. Armenians attacked an Ottoman patrol to Djevdet's anger. This act led the Ottoman military forces to open fire upon the Armenian quarters of the city with artillery, effectively laying it under siege. This section of the city was called "Western Garden City".

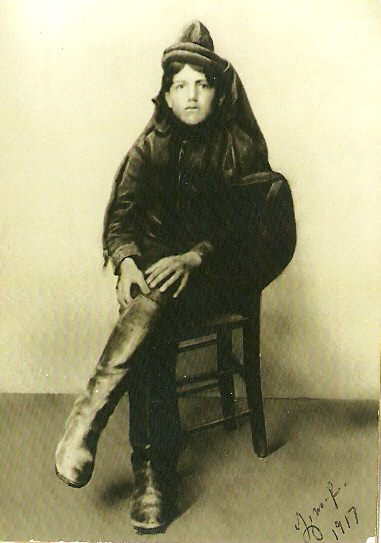
Dashnak courier boy in Van who served Aram Manukian, 1917

Armenian civilian forces fought in two disconnected sets of battles inside the city of Van. These battles were in the "Old City" (Kale District) and in the "Garden City" (Aygestan). The conflict in Garden City consisted of skirmishes along the Armenian and Muslim quarters. Both sides had fortified buildings and trenches along the opposite side. The Armenian church at Arak was burned by Djevdet's forces. The initial line was held by Armenian civilian forces throughout the conflict. As part of their strategy, they also attacked the nearby Ottoman barracks, but besides this, they did not take much offensive action. Though enemy artillery was largely ineffectual, they had superiority in men and arms.

On 25 April, the first small group of refugees from the country side arrived to the city through the road to Shushantz which was kept open by the Armenian civilian forces.

The Armenian defenders of Van, under the leadership of Aram Manukian, established a local provisional government dealing with defense, provisions, administration, and foreign relations, to ensure that the neutrality of foreign property was respected. Judges, police, and health officials were appointed. It soon became urgent to get a messenger out to inform the Russians of events. Several messengers, with messages sewn into their garments, were sent out, and twelve of them got through.

The city of Van during the Resistance

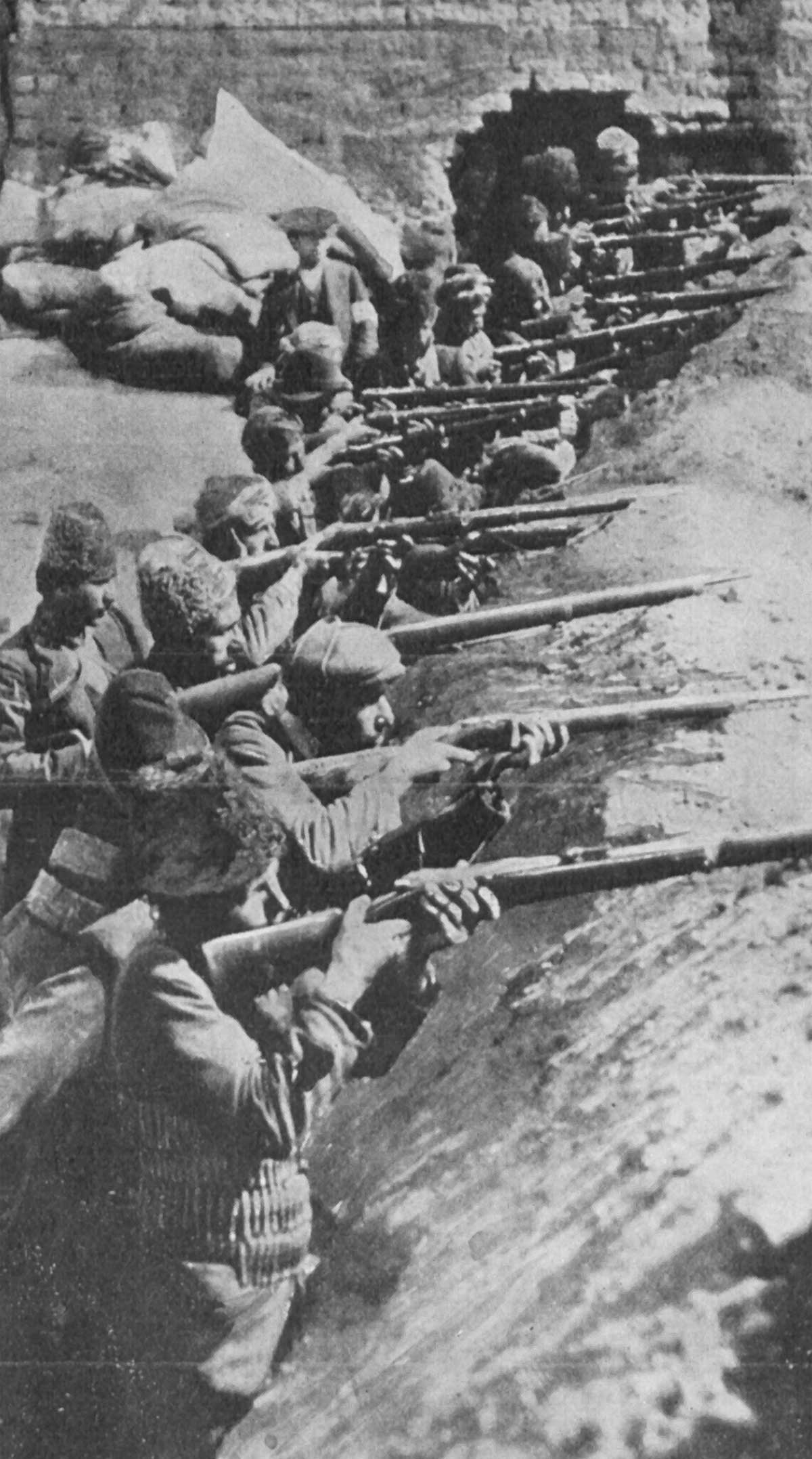
Defense line at the "old city", Van Fortress

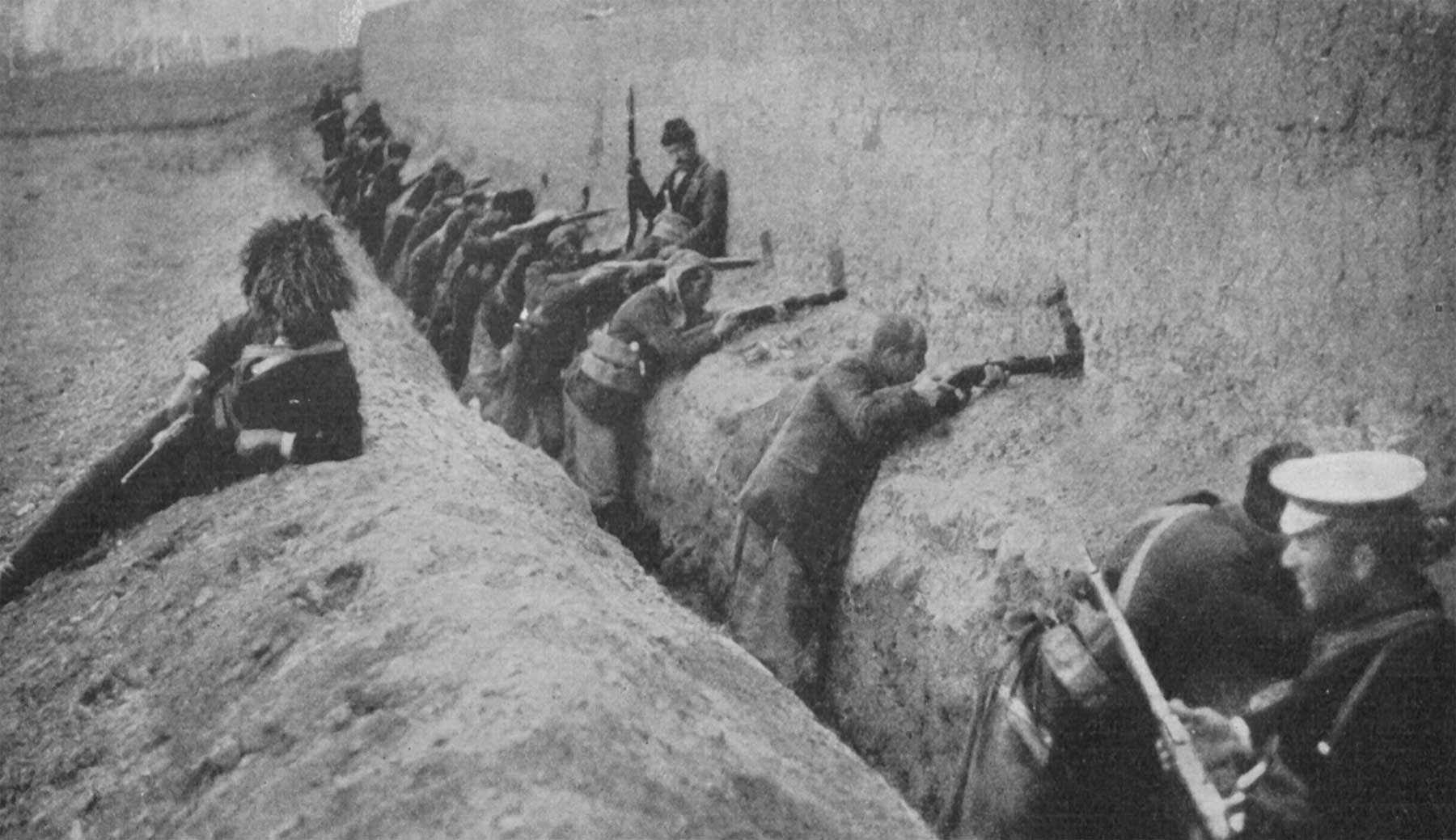
From Ussher, Armenians defending the trenches below the mission compound

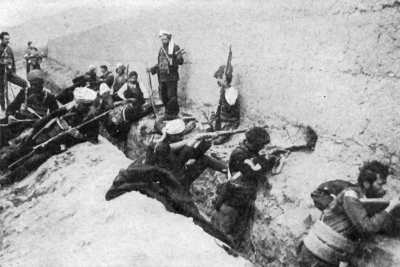

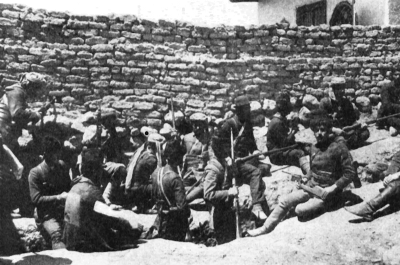

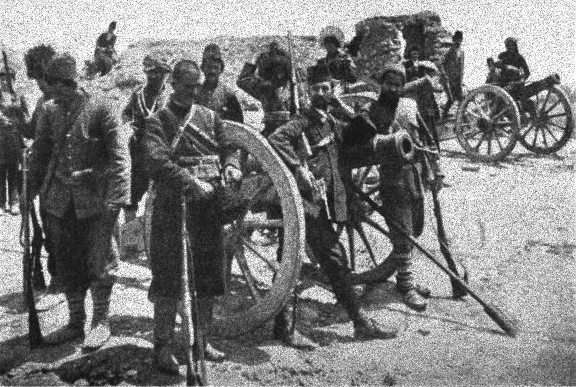
The cannons captured by the Armenians

=== Russian relief, May ===
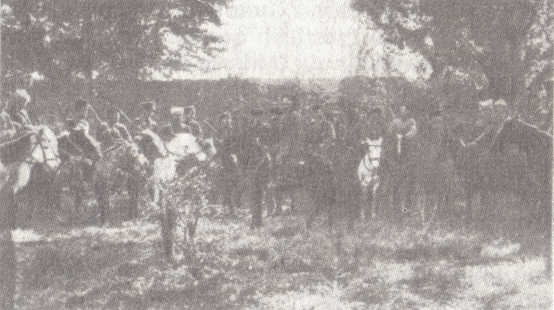
On 17 May, Russian cavalry and a detachment of Russian Armenian volunteers arrived to relieve the Armenian garrison of Van

On 28 April, Nikolai Yudenich ordered 2nd Transbaikal Cossack Brigade of General Trukhin and the Araratian volunteer brigade commanded by Sargis Mehrabyan (Vartan) to be dispatched from Yerevan towards Van. One of the twelve dispatched Armenian messengers reached Persia. An Armenian volunteer unit commanded by Andranik Ozanian, and a division commanded by Chernoroyal dispatched from Persia, were also sent on 8 May.

On 30 April, the number of refugees in the city totaled 15,000, the greater part of the refugees those fleeing from the countryside as they began to pour into city. The Armenians in the city at this time reached 30,000 residents, and 15,000 refugees in an area of roughly one square kilometer of the Armenian Quarter and suburb of Aigestan. Djevdet allowed Armenian survivors from the villages to enter the city through his lines. It is stated that this strategy was aimed to subdue the defenders with more ease. After easily fighting off the initial assaults, Armenian forces had great problems with their supply of ammunition. Armenians employed all sorts of devices to draw the fire of the enemy and waste their ammunition in turn. Their bullet and cartridge manufacturing reached 2,000 a day. The defenders also improvised mortars and barricades, and reportedly made use of anything they could find.

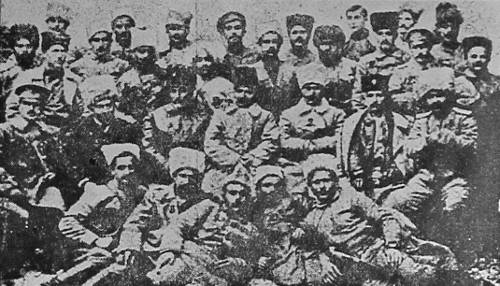
General Andranik and Armenak Yekarian with Group of Defenders of Van

On 6 May, a major Russian offensive toward Anatolia developed. The Ottoman defensive lines consisted of the X and XI Corps and the 5th Expeditionary Force at the north flank located beyond the province of Van. The north flank of the Russian advance, from Tortum valley toward Erzurum, was not part of the operations in Van. However, as part of this Russian offensive, the Ottoman 1st Expeditionary Force and the Van Cavalry Brigade were pushed back from their initial positions by Russian soldiers and Armenian voluenteers advancing toward the city of Van. On 12 May, the town of Ardjish at the north of province of Van was relieved. Djevdet sent one cannon and two hundred men from the city of Van to face this group at the Bargiri (Muradiye). However, it was a late move and far too weak to stop this advance. On 6 May, the conflicts around the citadel of Van (in the Kale District) were over.

On the evening of 14 May, a group of ships filled with Turkish women and children evacuating the region sailed from Van. More ships followed the next day. On 16 May, an Ottoman bombardment of 46 shells covered the retreat of the Turkish units. At the same time, there were reports of up to 6,000 Armenians being killed. Contemporary New York Times reports during April–June 1915 attributed the massacres and fighting to Kurdish auxiliary forces rather than Turkish units.

Djevdet abandoned the city on the night between 16 and 17 May and retreated toward Bashkale, joining the 1st Expeditionary Force under the command of Kaymakam Halil Bey (Kut).

On 17 May, Armenian civilian forces officially had control of the town. At the same time, the advance guard of the Russian forces, which pushed the 1st and 3rd Ottoman Cavalry Brigades from the city of Manzikert since 11 May, reached the northern area of the province and extended up to the shores of Lake Van, and the advance guard of Russian forces already in the town pushed the Ottoman forces with a continued press to the south of city. These retreating Ottoman forces experienced logistical shortages caused by the interdiction of lines of communication. Soon after, the Russian regulars followed them.

According to Ussher, on 18 May, the group dispatched from Persia reached the city of Van. By 20 May, the main centers of the Van province were occupied by Russians. On 23 May 1915, a detachment of Russian soldiers occupied the town of Van, thus bringing eagerly awaited relief to the Armenians, who were besieged by the Ottomans. However, the Russians were busy fighting against the Ottomans and they did not have control of the countryside. The only power left in the countryside consisted of Armenian civilian forces.

General Trukhin's 2nd Transbaikal Cossack Brigade did not reach Beghrikale until 24 May. General Nazarbekov's 2nd Caucasian Rifle Brigade had been ordered to support Truhin was at Bashkale on 7 May. On 31 May, Trukhin entered city. On the same day, Truhin's patrol and Nazarbekov's advance-guard came into contact between Van and Hoshap.

General Yudenich received the keys to the city and citadel after his arrival. He confirmed the Armenian provisional government. Aram Manukian was appointed the governor of Van province. Armenakis Yekarian became the police chief. Fighting shifted farther west for the rest of the summer with the city of Van secure. Upon the arrival of the Russians the Ottomans retreated west of Lake Van in the direction of Bitlis.

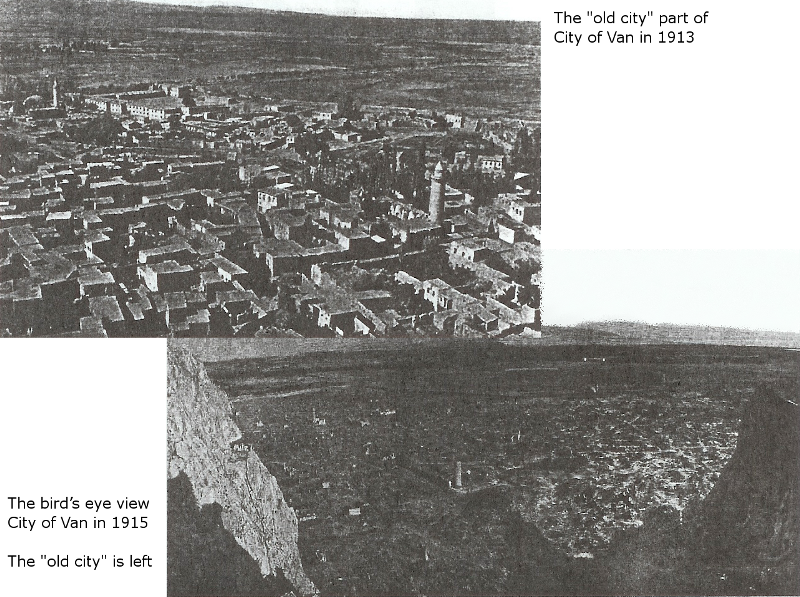
The bird's eye view of the city in 1913 and 1915

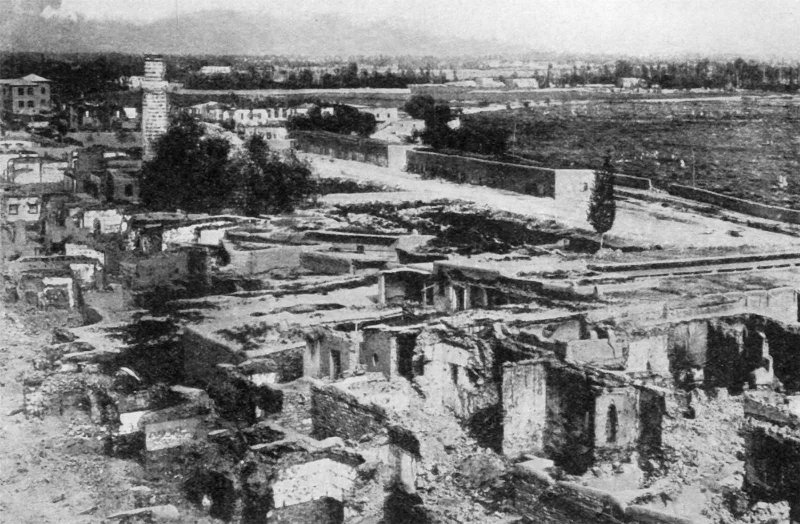
City of Van neighborhood in closeup

== Aftermath ==
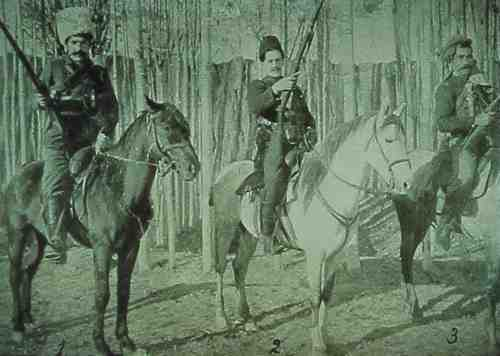
Armenian cavalry

Throughout June and July, as Turkish and Russian forces battled to the north of the Van region, thousands of Armenians from Mush and other neighbouring provinces started flooding into the city of Van. There were as many as 250,000 Armenians crowded into the city. This included people who broke away from the deportation columns as they passed the vicinity of the province on their way to Mosul. Before the crisis, the city of Van had housed and fed no more than 50,000 people.

On 5 June 1915, the northern shores of lake Van were devoid of Ottoman forces. The Russians, advancing on lines to the north of Lake Van, pushed further west toward the Turkish city of Mush. As part of this new drive, the Russian army redeployed forces from the province of Van around the north side of Lake Van to the town of Manzikert, intending a new offensive into Anatolia, toward Mush. The losses taken by the Ottoman 3rd Army during the preceding Enver winter offensive had created a salient in the Turkish southern flank of their Caucasus front, a salient that created an initial opportunity for Russian forces. However, this opportunity was short lived and six weeks later the Russian forces suffered reverses that would have severe consequences for the Armenian population in the city of Van.

On 11 July, during a reorganisation of Turkish forces, Van province was assigned the responsibility of the Right wing group (Sağ Cenah Grubu) of the 3rd Army, along with the other southern provinces. Mirliva Abdulkerim Pasha was assigned as commander and Enver Pasha ordered this formation to be an independent operational entity of the 3rd Army. Mirliva Abdulkerim Pasha managed to stop the Russian advance by 16 July.

=== First evacuation, July 1915 ===
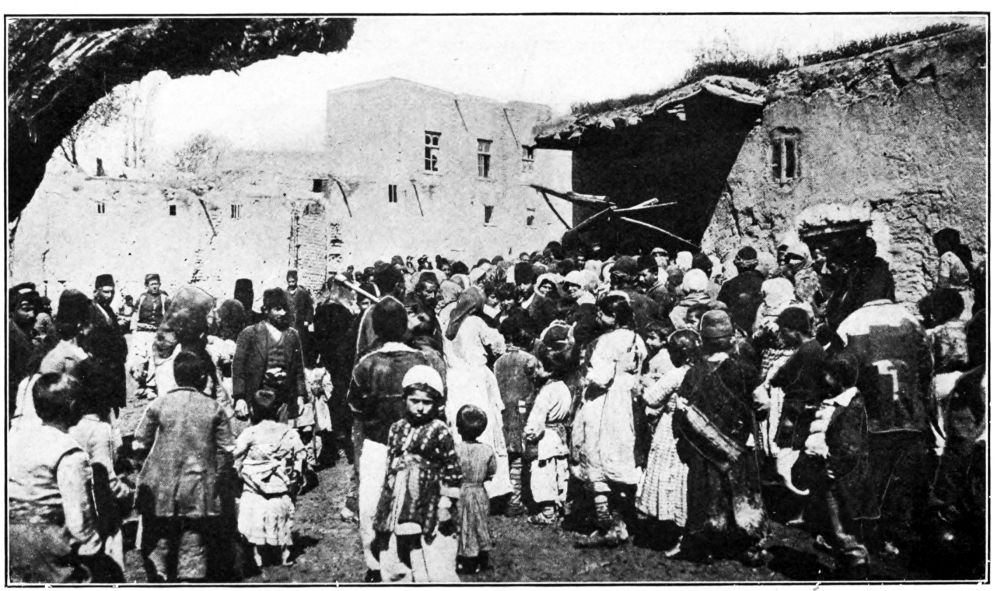
Armenian refugees at Van

On 16 July, the Ottoman Army, having concentrated more forces than the Russians, thwarted a planned Russian offensive and pushed the Russian Army back at the Battle of Manzikert (10–26 July 1915), capturing the city. There then followed the Battle of Kara Killisse which saw the Russian recapture of Manzikert. As a result of these operations to the north of Lake Van, the Russians evacuated their remaining combat forces from the city of Van. Armen Garo, and his assistant, Khetcho asked General Abatzieff to permit the Armenian inhabitants in the Van area to move with the Russian army toward Iğdır. This request was rejected on the grounds that the movement of vital Russian army transports could not be done promptly if hampered by refugees. For eight consecutive days during July, General Nikolaeff kept the Armenian leaders idle. The Russian General told them every day that he would not retreat under any circumstances, and that therefore it was entirely needless to remove the people.

On 18 July, General Nikolaeff sent a dispatch to Aram Manukian, and Sargis Mehrabyan (Vartan) for evacuation. General Trokin was in the city at this time. He offered to evacuate the Armenian population to Russian territory through the northern passages. General Trokin received a dispatch just after five hours to leave the city and exit through Persia. This left the Armenian volunteers as the only defenders of the Armenian refugees. "The panic was indescribable. After a long resistance to Djevdet Bey, after the city's liberation, after an establishment of an Armenian governorship, all was blighted." Armenian civilian forces drew the attention of four Ottoman divisions and tens of thousands of Kurds during their retreat. The battalions of Armenian volunteers took no active part in the battles of July. They were undertaking the heavy duty of rear guard work for the Russian army and the Armenian refugees in the district of Van.

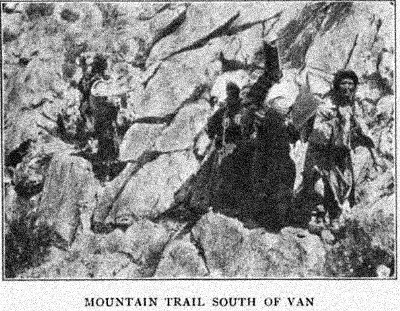
Refugees at the Mountain Passes, such as the Pass of Beghrikale.

On 4 August, Russian forces from Van made an exit toward Persia and took defensive positions at the Bargiri, Saray and Hoshap districts of Van province. The refugee group following the Russian forces were stopped by Kurdish forces while they crossed the mountain passes to the north of Pass of Beghrikale. At the Pass of Berkri Kale, the Armenian refugees suffered major casualties. Refugees that reached the other side were assisted by Armenian relief agencies.

On 5 August, Russian forces making an exit toward the Russian Caucasus from Van retreated 20 km (12 mi) into Russian territory, the Russian retreat followed up by the Ottoman Right Wing. Abdülkerim Pasha had earlier sought permission before leaving the Van Province to advance into Russian territory. Enver Pasha personally gave the order to advance up to Eleşkirt and Kara Kilise and clear the border region of all Russian elements.

In early August 1915, nearly 200,000 refugees fleeing behind the retreating Russian forces swarmed into Transcaucasia. There were two major groups of refugees that left the city; one group which left under the protection of Armenian volunteers; and another group which tried to leave by their own means. Nearly 150,000 Armenian inhabitants were compelled to leave all their property at the mercy of enemy fire and flee toward Yerevan under the protection of volunteers. The refugees under volunteer protection suffered a loss between 8,000 and 10,000 men, women, and children. More than 5,000 refugees died fighting tribal attacks in the mountain crossings. As many as 40,000 Armenians perished during this flight, the majority being those in columns lacking volunteer protection. The commander of Armenian volunteer units later claimed: "If the Russian general had given an opportunity of seven or eight days to organize the retreat, it would have been possible to direct the people to Erivan without the loss of a single life.

On 29 September 1915, the Ottoman Army left the city of Van after staying for roughly one month. The Ottoman retreat was forced following defeats suffered by their armies in other regions of the Caucasus front, and in part because of the relative isolation during the World War I era of Van from Anatolian Turkey. (Note: As an explanation for the military impacts of geography, see Collins J., 'Military Geography', Brassey's, London, 1998. Pages 102–106 provide specific advice on the impact mountains can have on military operations.) Some of the Armenian residents who escaped to Transcaucasia returned.

On 19 January 1916, the Turkish defeat at the Battle of Koprukoy saw Russian forces advance once again towards Erzurum, a city laying halfway between Lake Van and the Black Sea. The Province of Van was under the Administration of Western Armenia until 1918. The conflicts between 1916 and 1918 were shifted to the west, to the north-west at the battle of Mush, and to the south-west at the battle of Bitlis of the Van Province.

=== Final evacuation, April 1918 ===
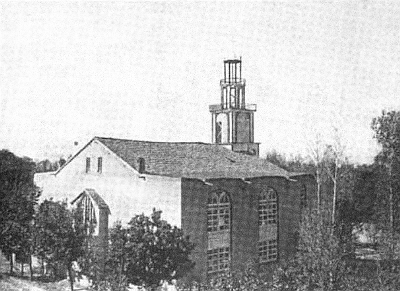
1917, The church became the military headquarters

The Russian Revolution of 1917 changed the situation in the region again. The Russian armies began to disintegrate. Van was completely cut off from the Allies. The British Army did not move very far beyond Baghdad in the Mesopotamian campaign. Armenians of Van attempted to hold their ground and were joined in the defense by Assyrians.

On 3 March 1918, the Grand vizier Talat Pasha signed the Treaty of Brest-Litovsk with the Russian SFSR. The Treaty of Brest-Litovsk stipulated that the border be pulled back to prewar levels and the cities of Batum, Kars, and Ardahan to be transferred to Ottoman Empire. Early in 1918 the Ottoman 3rd Army moved to an offensive against Armenians. Vehib Pasha executed the offensive in three wings. On the right wing, Van province was assigned to IV Corps. IV Corps assignment was to extend to Beyazit.

In April 1918, Armenians of Van resisted in Van one more time. On 4 April, the city of Van started changing hands several times. The Ottoman Army again controlled of city of Van by 6 April, followed by Beyazit on 14 April. Armenians of Van were eventually forced to evacuate and withdraw from the province of Van. Armenians of Van retreated eastward toward Persian Azerbaijan. They made a stand near Dilman. They repulsed the Ottomans once there, at the Battle of Dilman (1918), but, on being attacked again, were compelled to retreat southward around Lake Urmiah. In pursuit of the Van Armenians and Assyrian mountaineers, the Ottoman 3rd Army clashed with Urmieh Assyrians, which made them refugees as well, in this retreat southward toward Mesopotamia.

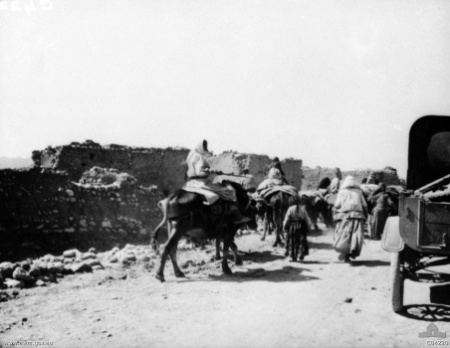
Armenians from Van districts; passing through Ruz on their way to Bakuba refugee camp

During July 1918 the British Army occupied the greater portion of Mesopotamia during the Mesopotamian Campaign, as well as a large part of Persian Azerbaijan during the Persian Campaign. Preparations were made for the establishment of a large camp for Armenian and Assyrian refugees near Bakubah, Iraq.

During the first week of September 1918, retreating Armenians from Van came to the Bakubah refugee camp in parties of 1,000 or 2,000, by road and by train. Many of them were suffering from dysentery, typhus and relapsing fever, and there was a small epidemic of smallpox among the children. There were many who died along the road because of weakness and starvation. This went on through September and the first half of October, until about 40,000 had been received in all. Towards the end of September it was decided to raise four battalions from among the Armenians on the lines of an Indian infantry battalion. The 2nd Battalion was established by Van Armenians. The 3rd Battalion was established by Armenians from other regions. The G.O.C. North Persian Force decided to locate the 2nd Battalion around Senna, while the 3rd Battalion moved to Bijar.

On 30 October 1918, the Ottoman Empire signed the Armistice of Mudros and military operations ended.

== Results ==
=== Reports on self-defense ===
The consulates of the United States, Germany, and Austria-Hungary, as well as a number of Ottoman officials, recorded and documented reasons for the Van uprising:

I have told this story of the "Revolution" in Van not only because it marked the first stage in this organized attempt to wipe out a whole nation, but because these events are always brought forward by the Turks as a justification of their subsequent crimes. As I shall relate, Enver, Talaat, and the rest, when I appealed to them in behalf of the Armenians, invariably instanced the "revolutionists" of Van as a sample of Armenian treachery. The famous "Revolution", as this recital shows, was merely the determination of the Armenians to save their women's honour and their own lives, after the Turks, by massacring thousands of their neighbours, had shown them the fate that awaited them.

— Henry Morgenthau, Sr., Ambassador Morgenthau's Story

On 15 April 1915, the German ambassador in Constantinople, reported:

Armenians have given up their ideas of a revolution since the introduction of the Constitution and that there is no organization for such a revolt.

— Hans Freiherr von Wangenheim

The Divisional General and Vice Marshal and Austrian Military Attaché and Military Plenipotentiary to the Ottoman Empire said:

The Van uprising certainly was an act of desperation. The local Armenians realized that general massacres against the Armenians had already started and they would be the next target. In the course of the summer 1915 the Turkish government with inexorable consequence brought its bloody task of extermination of an entire nation to an end.

— Joseph Pomiankowski

The governor-general of the Ottoman Empire in Erzurum, Tahsin Bey wrote that:

There was not and could not have been an uprising in Van. Through our constant pressure [of the local population] we have created a mess from which we can no longer escape, and we have put the army in a difficult position in the East.

Elizabeth Barrows Ussher, Christian missionary and wife of Clarence Ussher wrote:

Although the Vali calls it a rebellion, it is really an effort to protect the lives and the homes of the Armenians.

— Elizabeth Barrows Ussher

Grace Knapp, Christian missionary:

The fact cannot be too strongly emphasized that there was no "rebellion." As already pointed out, the revolutionists meant to keep the peace if it lay in their power to do so. But for some time past a line of Turkish entrenchments had been secretly drawn round the Armenian quarter of the Gardens. The Revolutionists, determined to sell their lives as dearly as possible, prepared a defensive line, of entrenchments.

— Grace Knapp

An official of the Turkish Government stated:

I have followed the matter from its source. I have enquired from inhabitants and officials of Van, who were in Diarbekir, whether any Moslem had been killed by Armenians in the town of Van, or in the districts of the Vilayet. They answered in the negative, saying that the Government had ordered the population to quit the town before the arrival of the Russians and before anyone was killed; but that the Armenians had been summoned to give up their arms and had not done so, dreading an attack by the Kurds, and dreading the Government also; the Government had further demanded that the principal Notables and leading men should be given up to them as hostages, but the Armenians had not complied. All this took place during the approach of the Russians towards the city of Van. As to the adjacent districts, the authorities collected the Armenians and drove them into the interior, where they were all slaughtered, no Government official or private man, Turk or Kurd, having been killed.

— Faiz El-Ghusein

Ibrahim Avras, a Van deputy in the Ottoman parliament, was in the city at the time, and reported that the CUP was secretly provoking people to attack Armenians.

=== Casualties ===
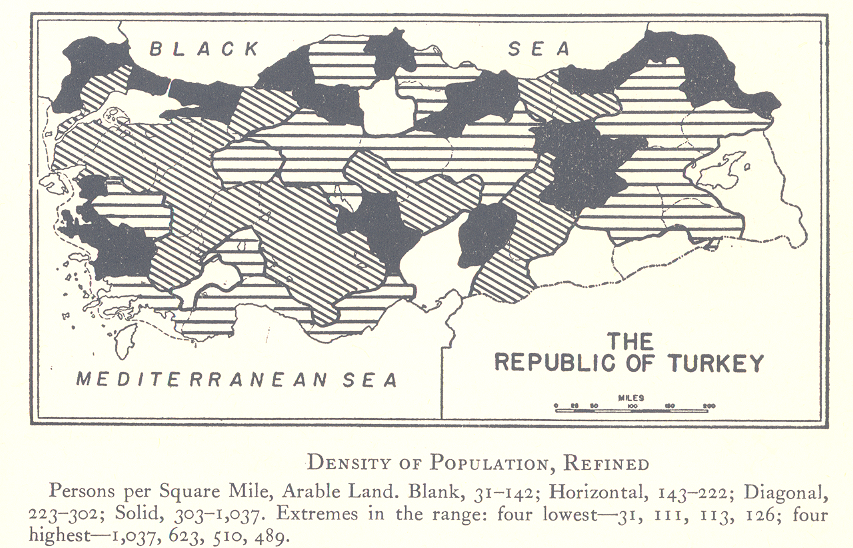
The first post war census was conducted in 1927. The province of Van's population density showed a sharp decline compared to neighboring provinces.

On 15 May 1915, the Russian consul at the city of Van reported that 6,000 Armenians had been massacred at Van, which has been the scene of so many similar outrages during the last twenty years.

Henry Morgenthau referring to Doctor Ussher, "after driving off the Turks, Russians cremated the bodies of Armenians who had been murdered in the province, with the result that 55,000 bodies were burned". The systematic massacre of 25,000 Armenians in the Bashkala district, of whom less than 10 per cent, were said to have escaped, appeared to have been ordered.

Though Armenian refugees were the focus of attention of the Western powers and all the relief efforts, most of the Armenian deaths still occurred in the refugee camps, where the casualty rate was as high as 300–400 a day in the Russian Caucasus from starvation and diseases, as reported by the British Consul in the area.

==== Atrocities ====
Most of the killings were attributed to Circassians and Kurds, although some reports state that Turkish troops also took part. Rafael De Nogales, a Venezuelan officer fighting for the Turks, mentions in his memoirs that Ottoman officials had received orders to exterminate all Armenian males of twelve years of age and older. According to Ussher, on 19 April, Djevdet issued an order throughout the Van province, which read: "The Armenians must be exterminated. If any Muslim protects a Christian, first, his house shall be burnt; then the Christian killed before his eyes, then his [the Muslim's] family and then himself." Djevdet was later accused of war crimes at the Turkish Courts-Martial of 1919–20 against the Armenians during operations around the city of Van during the spring of 1915.

== Cultural references ==
The resistance occupies a significant place in Armenian national identity because it symbolizes the Armenians' will to resist. The 2002 film Ararat, directed, written, and co-produced by Atom Egoyan re-stages (with limited means) some fictionalized events of the defense of Van. Ararat won several awards. To commemorate the defenders of the battle a memorial was created during the 1970s in Soviet Armenia in Agarak, Talin village.

== See also ==
- Ottoman Armenian population
- Six vilayets
- Occupation of Turkish Armenia

== Bibliography ==
=== Personal Accounts ===
- Austin, H. H. (1920). The Baqubah Refugee Camp. London: The Faith Press.
- de Nogales Méndez, Rafael (1926). Four Years beneath the Crescent. London: Charles Scribner's Sons. ISBN 1-903656-19-2.
- Hacobian, Avetoon Pesak (1917), Armenia and the War.
- Northcote, Dudley S (1922). "Saving Forty Thousand Armenians". Current History. New York Times Co.
- Pasdermadjian, Garegin; Torossian, Aram (1918). Why Armenia Should be Free: Armenia's Role in the Present War. Hairenik.
- Ussher, Clarence D. (1917). An American Physician in Turkey. Houghton Mifflin.

=== Collections ===
- Halsey, Francis Whiting (1919). "History of the World War". The Literary Digest. Funk & Wagnalls.
- Morgenthau, Henry (1918). "The "Revolution" at Van". Ambassador Morgenthau's Story. Doubleday, Page & Co.
- Toynbee, Arnold Joseph; Bryce, James (1916). "Vilayet of Van". The Treatment of Armenians on the Ottoman Empire. London: Couston & Sons.

=== Recent publications ===
- A-Do (2017), Van 1915: The Great Events of Vasbouragan, Gomidas Institute, ISBN 978-1-909382-37-4.
- Akçam, Taner (1999), İnsan Hakları ve Ermeni sorunu: İttihat ve Terakki'den Kurtuluş Savaşı'na (in Turkish), İmge Kitabevi, ISBN 978-975-533-246-8.
- ——— (2006), A Shameful Act: The Armenian Genocide and the Question of Turkish Responsibility, New York: Metropolitan Books, ISBN 0-8050-7932-7.
- ——— (2007), A shameful act: the Armenian genocide and the question of Turkish responsibility (1 ed.), New York, NY: Metropolitan Books/Holt, ISBN 978-0-80508665-2 - Profile at Google Books
- Allen, William Edward David; Muratoff, Paul (2011), Caucasian Battlefields: A History of the Wars on the Turco-Caucasian Border 1828–1921, Cambridge University Press, ISBN 978-1-108-01335-2.
- Balakian, Peter (2004), The Burning Tigris: The Armenian Genocide and America's Response, New York: HarperCollins, ISBN 0-06-055870-9.
- Bloxham, Donald (2005), The Great Game of Genocide, Oxford University Press
- Brumlik, Micha (2004), Völkermord und Kriegsverbrechen in der ersten Hälfte des 20 (in German), Campus, ISBN 3-593-37282-7.
- McCarthy, Justin (1983), Muslims and Minorities: The Population of Ottoman Anatolia and the End of the Empire, New York Univ Press
- ———; et al. (2006), The Armenian Rebellion at Van, Salt Lake City: University of Utah Press, ISBN 978-0-87480-870-4.
- Charney, Israel (1994). The Widening Circle of Genocide. W. W. Norton & Co. ISBN 1-4128-3965-3.
- Dadrian, Vahakn (February 2002), "The Armenian Question and the Wartime Fate of the Armenians as Documented by the Officials of the Ottoman Empire's World War I Allies: Germany and Austria-Hungary", International Journal of Middle East Studies, 34 (1): 59–85, doi:10.1017/S0020743802001034.
- Erickson, Edward J. (2001). Ordered to Die: A History of the Ottoman Army in the First World War. Greenwood. ISBN 978-0-313-31516-9.
- Gust, Wolfgang; Gust, Sigrid (2005), The Armenian Genocide during the First World War.
- Herrera, Hayden (3 January 2005). Arshile Gorky: His Life and Work. Macmillan. ISBN 1-46681708-9.
- Borisyuk, Andrey (2024). Забытая война. Россия в 1914-1918 [The forgotten war. Russia in 1914-1918] (in Russian). Moscow: Вече. ISBN 978-5-4484-5078-5.
- Oleynikov, Alexei (2024). Великое отступление и стабилизация восточного фронта [The Great Retreat and stabilization of the Eastern Front]. Moscow: Вече. ISBN 978-5-4484-4482-1.
- Hinterhoff, Eugene (1984). Illustrated Encyclopedia of World War I. Vol. iv. Persia: The Stepping Stone To India. New York: Marshall Cavendish. ISBN 0-86307-181-3.
- Hovannisian, Richard G (1967), Armenia on the Road to Independence, 1918, University of California Press.
- ——— (1997), The Armenian People from Ancient to Modern Times, vol. II. Foreign Dominion to Statehood: The Fifteenth Century to the Twentieth Century, Palgrave, ISBN 978-0-312-10169-5.
- ——— (1997b), The Armenian People from Ancient to Modern Times, New York: St. Martin's Press.
- ———, ed. (2000). Armenian Van/Vaspurakan. Costa Mesa, CA: Mazda. ISBN 1-56859130-6.
- Kharmandarian, Peter (11 March 2015). "Lost in Time: Armenian Heritage & Genocide". Art on the banks. Archived from the original on 2 April 2015.
- Kevorkian, Raymond H; Paboudjian, Paul B (1992), Les Arméniens dans l'Empire Ottoman à la vielle du génocide [Armenians in the Ottoman empire before the genocide] (in French), Paris: ARHIS.
- Kloian, Richard Diran, ed. (1980), The Armenian Genocide.
- Krikorian, Mesrob K. (1978). Armenians in the Service of the Ottoman Empire, 1860–1908. Routledge. ISBN 978-0-7100-8564-1.
- Mazian, Florence (1990), Why Genocide?: The Armenian and Jewish Experiences in Perspective, Iowa State University Press, ISBN 978-0-8138-0143-8
- "Fresno Armenians", by Wilson Wallace, Ph.D. 1965 M (Michael) Minassian
- Matossian, Nouritza (1998). Black angel: a life of Arshile Gorky. Chatto & Windus. p. 576. ISBN 978-0701153632.
- Ter Minassian, Anahide (2000), "Van 1915", in Hovannisian, Richard G (ed.), Armenian Van/Vaspurakan.
- Panossian, Razmik (21 April 2007), Armenian Genocide Insert, vol. 73.
- Reynolds, Joseph Francis; Churchill, Allen Leon; Miller, Francis Trevelyan, eds. (1916), The Story of the Great War: History of the European War from Official Sources; Complete Historical Records of Events to Date, vol. 3, P.F. Collier & Son.
- Sâbis, Ali İhsan (20 September 1990), Birinci Dünya Harbi [First World War] (in Turkish), vol. 2, Nehir Yayınları, ISBN 975-551-067-2.
- Schemi, Kara, Turcs ey Armeniens [Turks & Armenians], p. 61.
- Shaw, Stanford Jay; Shaw, Ezel Kural (1977). History of the Ottoman Empire and Modern Turkey. Cambridge University Press.
- Stevens (January 1916), To H.M. Principal Secretary of State for Foreign Affairs, Batoum, FO 371/2768.
- Walker, Christopher J (1990), Armenia: The Survival of a Nation, London: Palgrave Macmillan, archived from the original on 24 November 2005.
- Yayınları, T.C. Genelkurmay Harp Tarihi Başkanlığı (1972), Türk İstiklâl Harbine Katılan Tümen ve Daha Üst Kademelerdeki Komutanların Biyografileri (in Turkish), Ankara: Genkurmay Başkanlığı Basımevi, ISBN 975-551-067-2.
