= Armenak Yekarian =

Armenian revolutionary

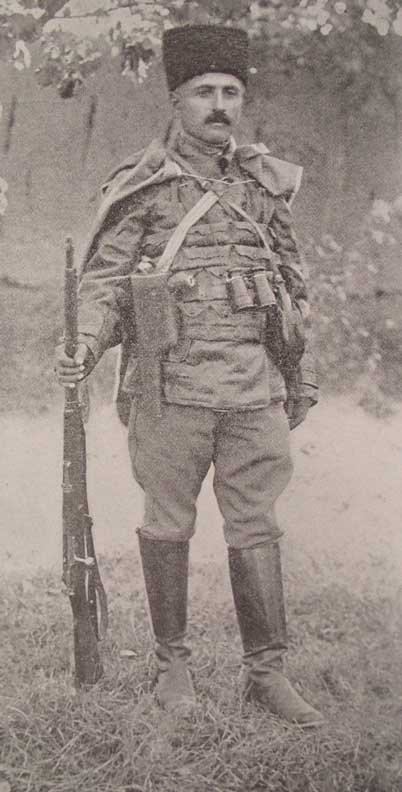
- Born: Armenakis Yekarian; 1870; Van, Van Vilayet, Ottoman Empire
- Died: 1926 (aged 55–56); Cairo, Egypt
- Military career
- Allegiance: Armenakan
- Service years: 1890s–1918
- Conflicts: Armenian National Liberation Movement: Defense of Van (1896); World War I: Defense of Van (1915)

Armenakis Yekarian (Armenian: Արմենակ Եկարյան; 1870–1926) was an Armenian fedayee. Yekarian was born in Van, Ottoman Empire. He joined the Armenian national liberation movement through the ranks of the Armenakans in 1888. His early education was at Varagavank monastery. In 1896, during the defense of Van, he obtaining weapons from Persia to organize self-defense in the city. He was imprisoned with 40 of his comrades and then released at the end of the conflict. Thereafter, he left the Ottoman Empire as required by the Sultan. He took refuge in Urmia in Persia. After the deposition of the Sultan by the Young Turk Revolution, he returned to Van in 1908. He joined the Van resistance in 1915. After the Armenian victory, they set up an Armenian provisional government, with Aram Manukian at its head. Armenak Yekarian became the police chief. Aram Manoukian, Armenak Yekarian and others tried to give a national-civil character to the exclusively militarized administration. In 1922, he emigrated with his family to Cairo, Egypt, where he died in 1926. His family moved to Soviet Armenia in 1947.
