= Elizabeth Barrows Ussher =

Armenian Christian missionary

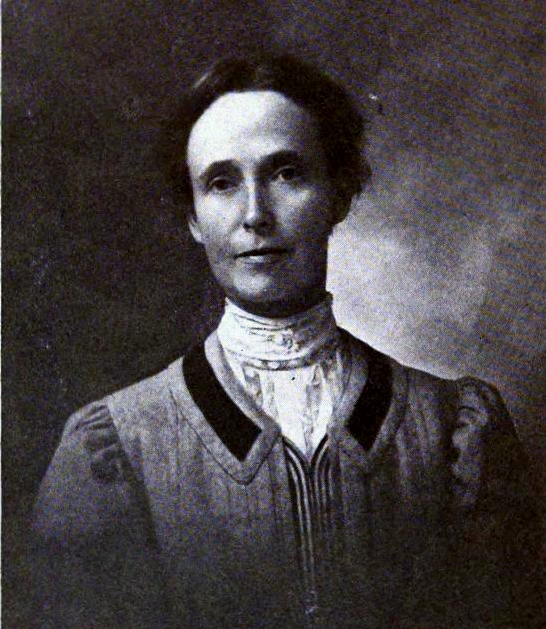
- Born: 20 October 1873; Kayseri, Ottoman Empire
- Died: 20 September 1915 (aged 41); Van, Ottoman Empire
- Occupations: Christian missionary and witness to the Armenian genocide

Elizabeth Freeman Barrows Ussher (20 October 1873 – 14 July 1915) was a Christian missionary and a witness to the Armenian genocide. Barrows described the atrocities against the Armenians as "systematic and wholesale massacre." Much of her life is described in the 1916 publication by her father John Otis Barrows, who described her as a "martyr of the Great War". She was the wife of missionary physician Clarence Ussher.

== Life and work ==
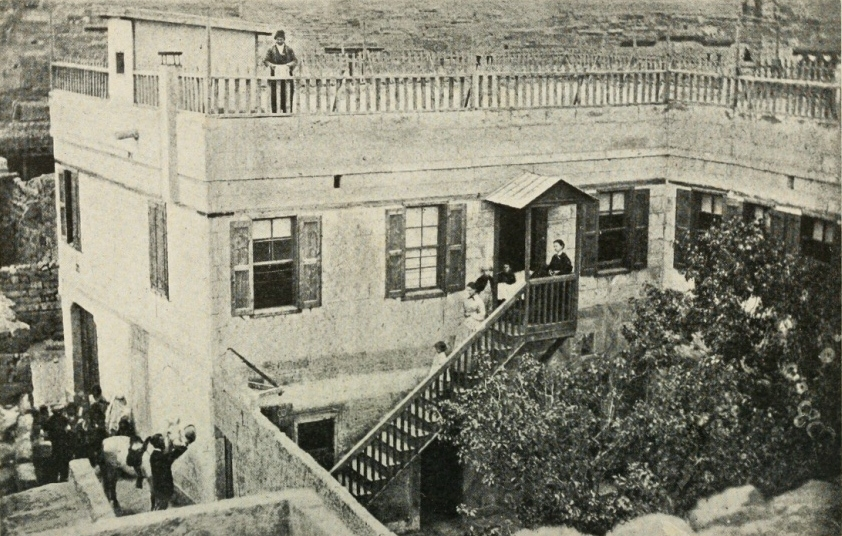
The house in Kayseri, Ottoman Empire where Elizabeth Barrows was born

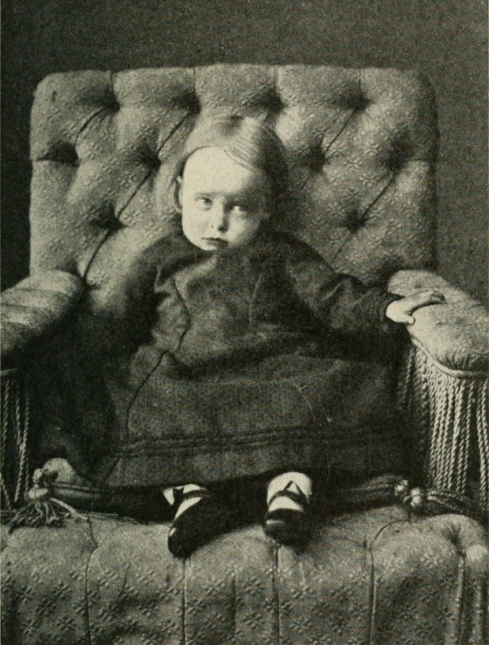
Picture of Elizabeth Barrows taken in Constantinople when she was two years old. She was often called "Little Lizzie" by those around her.

Elizabeth Freeman Barrows was born in Kayseri, Ottoman Empire on 20 October 1873 to Christian missionary parents. Due to her brother's poor health condition, when Barrows was two years old she and her family moved to Manisa in the hope that a change of environment would be helpful for the child. Once in Manisa, the Barrows family remained with other missionaries already stationed there. After Elizabeth's brother's health improved, the family traveled to Constantinople, where they managed to find a house in Beşiktaş, a suburb of the city.

When Elizabeth was seven, the family visited the United States and headed for New England. The family eventually settled in Atkinson, New Hampshire and, at the age of eleven, Elizabeth Barrows was baptized in the local church. The Barrows family then moved to Newington, Connecticut, where Elizabeth received her early education. She continued her education with Evangelist preacher Dwight L. Moody at the age of fourteen in 1888. Barrows entered the Northfield Seminary and studied there for three years. After returning to her family residence in Connecticut, she became a teacher in a local school. In 1895, after teaching for nearly a year, she was accepted in Goucher College in Baltimore, Maryland. She was known as 'Beth' by her classmates and was elected vice-president of her class. A classmate wrote of her:

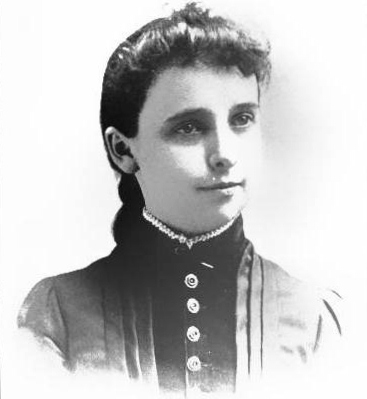
Elizabeth Barrows at the age of fourteen

The first characteristic which impressed me was her absolute sincerity. Another characteristic was her serenity of spirit and her sweetness which was never insipidity. Behind it appeared character, unyielding in its integrity, a quiet firmness where principle was involved which nothing could move. Her missionary spirit was as a beautiful radiance that illuminated her personality. But, with it all, she was sweetly human.

After graduating from the seminary, Barrows decided to return to the Ottoman Empire and serve as a missionary in the region. She embarked from Boston, Massachusetts, on 18 October 1899 and arrived in Constantinople, where she remained for five days and then took a boat to Trabzon. From Trabzon she went to Erzurum en route to Van, where she was to be greeted by Clarence Ussher and other missionaries. However, in the meantime, an order was sent from Constantinople demanding that Barrows be sent back to the capital under suspicion of Armenian revolutionary activity. The suspicion was based on a telegraph sent from the England branch of the Armenian Relief Society, suggesting that she take care of Armenian orphans. Through the intervention of the American consuls in Erzurum, permission was ultimately granted. Barrows married Clarence Ussher on 26 June 1900 in a church in Van. The wedding was the first American wedding in Van and the ceremony was attended by many Ottoman dignitaries and prominent members of the Armenian community.

Following her marriage, Elizabeth Ussher became a teacher at a girls school in Van and was the head of the musical department. She also taught Biblical studies to various other schools in the area and was part of the Young Women's Christian Association in Van. She helped provide shelter for orphans and widows and taught them arts and crafts. Many of the items produced by the orphans and widows were sold around the world. After teaching for a few years, she decided to return to the United States in 1908, where she visited her family in the town of Stonington, Connecticut. After staying for a year, Ussher decided to return, embarking from Boston on 24 July 1909 and arriving in Batum. After making a brief stop in Tiflis, Ussher went to Echmiadzin, Armenia to witness the anointment of the new Catholicos of All Armenians, Matthew II Izmirlian. She then departed from Echmiadzin and stopped in Igdir and eventually arrived in Van. A few years later, however, World War I began.

== Armenian genocide ==
These extracts from Mrs. Ussher's diary give only a glimpse of a few of the deeds of unspeakable cruelty, visited upon many thousand of innocent Armenians, by the Turkish government in its effort to crush those of that people who were righteously trying to defend themselves – their families and their firesides. The effort is to show how the author of these notes was related to these events.

— John Otis Barrows on the diary entries of Elizabeth Ussher

During the Armenian genocide, Elizabeth Ussher was stationed in Van when the Van Resistance took place. Throughout the time, she wrote about the events in daily entries in her diary. These diary entries, along with a description of the events, were then published by her father John Otis Barrows in 1917 in a book entitled In the Land of Ararat: A Sketch of the Life of Mrs. Elizabeth Freeman. Once the resistance began, Barrows stated that "although the Vali calls it a rebellion, it is really an effort to protect the lives and the homes of the Armenians." She also reported that a campaign of burning Armenian residences and households throughout various parts of area was initiated.

On 21 April, Ussher described the ominous circumstances of their stay at the summer home on the lakeside of Van:

Reports come to us of the burning of village after village, with outrages upon the women and children, and the shooting of the men. At night we could see the light of fire at Artemid, our summer home on the lake, about ten miles away, and at other villages. We learned later that our caretaker at Artemid had been killed, and that his wife had her hand cut off in trying to save him.

By 3 May, Ussher noted the relative resilience of the Armenians, and on 5 May added that "it has been more than two weeks since fighting began in the city, and the Armenians have the advantage. By this you see that the Vali has not succeeded in his diabolical purpose to wipe them out in three days." However, in a diary entry on the same day, she had also made note of the "systematic and wholesale" massacres against Armenians that were taking place throughout the vilayet of Van:

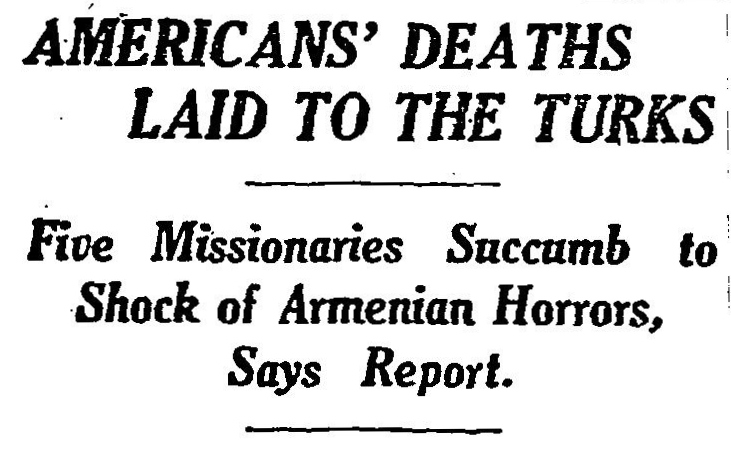
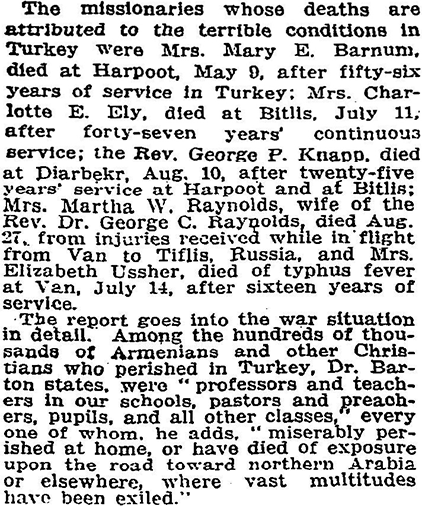
The death of Elizabeth Ussher as published by The New York Times on 3 November 1915. Other missionaries have also died due to typhus contracted by the refugees including George C. Raynolds, Martha W. Raynolds, George P. Knapp, Charlotte Ely, and Mary Barnum.

There is a strong resistance made in the city, for it is expected that the Russians will soon come to our assistance. But in the defenceless villages the story is very different. There the tragedy is too awful to be described. It is nothing but systematic and wholesale massacre. There is first the killing, and then the taking of prisoners, and sending them to the head of the Armenians to be fed. In this way it is expected that starvation will finish the slaughter. It is now evident that there was a well-laid plan to wipe out all the villages of the vilayet, and then crush the city rebels.

Ussher notes, however, that "many of the Turkish soldiers are averse to this butchery", adding that "the Vali has promised plunder and glory to the lawless Kurds, who are nothing loath to do his will." In the same entry, Ussher describes how forty women and children who were "dying or wounded from Turkish bullets" had been brought to their hospital to be cared for. In the meantime, Ussher describes how the Varak Armenian monastery, a refuge for some 2,000 people, was burnt and destroyed by the Turkish authorities.

== Death ==
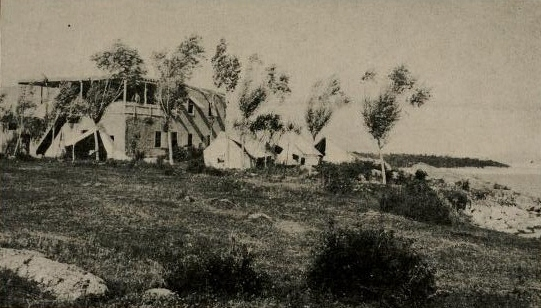
The house where Elizabeth Ussher died

Elizabeth Ussher and her husband were heavily involved in helping Armenians fleeing the genocide. They provided shelter in their residence to one hundred families; on 8 May Elizabeth described her home in this way: "Every available covered spot is crowded with families with little bedding, cribs, crying babies, and many sick from exposure, lack of food and fear."

She eventually contracted typhus which had broken out and spread amongst the refugees. She died on 14 July 1915 at the age of 41, in Edremit, Van on the shores of lake Van, and was buried in Van. Her husband also contracted typhus and went into a coma, but survived.

== See also ==
- Armenian genocide

== Bibliography ==
- Balakian, Peter (2009). The Burning Tigris. HarperCollins. ISBN 978-0061860171. - Profile at Google Books
- Barrows, John Otis (1916). In the Land of Ararat: A Sketch of the Life of Mrs. Elizabeth Freeman Barrows Ussher, Missionary to Turkey and a Martyr of the Great War. Fleming H. Revell.
- Boyajian, Dickran H. (1972). Armenia: the case for a forgotten genocide. Westwood, N.J.: Educational Book Crafters. ISBN 0912826029.
- Gherasim, Teodor (2006). Ancient Dictators and Modern Tyrants. AuthorHouse. ISBN 1463490070.
- Herrera, Hayden (2003). Arshile Gorky: his life and work (1st ed.). Farrar, Straus and Giroux. ISBN 0374529728.
- Knapp, Grace H. (1915). The mission at Van in Turkey in war time. Prospect Press.
- Oren, Michael B. (2011). Power, Faith, and Fantasy: America in the Middle East: 1776 to the Present. Transaction Publishers. ISBN 978-0-393-34152-2.
- Ussher, Clarence (1917). An American Physician in Turkey: A Narrative of Adventures in Peace and in War. Houghton Mifflin Company.
