= Balakian =

Balakian (Armenian: Պալագեան) is an Armenian surname. It may refer to:

- Anna Balakian (1915–1997), Armenian American scholar of Comparative Literature
- Grigoris Balakian (1875–1934), bishop of the Armenian Apostolic Church, who was the granduncle of Anna Balakian
- Nona Balakian
- Peter Balakian (born 1951), Armenian American poet, writer and academic, Professor of Humanities, 2016 Pulitzer Prize winner for Poetry, who is the nephew of Anna Balakian and the great-grandnephew of Grigoris Balakian
