= Grigoris Balakian =

Armenian bishop (1877–1934)

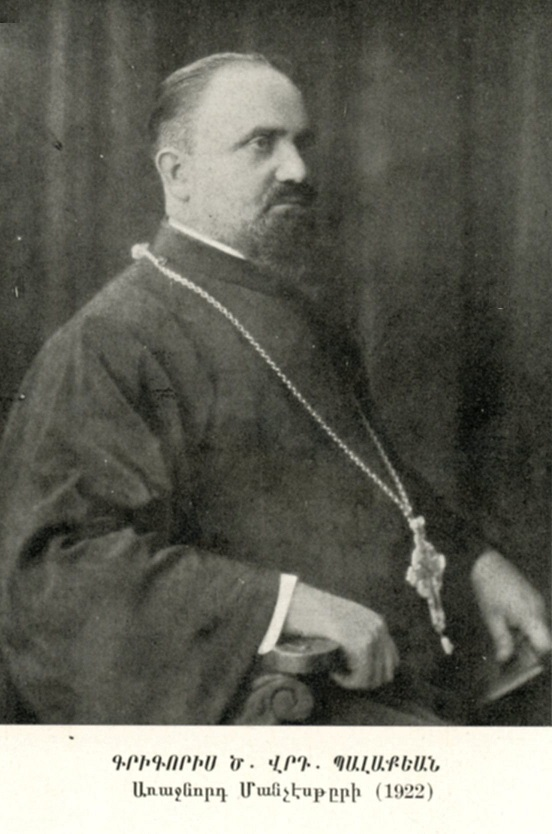
Grigoris Balakian (1922)

Grigoris Balakian (Armenian: Գրիգորիս Պալաքեան; 1875 – 8 October 1934), was a bishop of the Armenian Apostolic Church, in addition to being a survivor and memoirist of the Armenian genocide.

== Life ==
Grigoris Balakian was born in Tokat in the Ottoman Empire, and graduated from the Sanasarian College in Erzurum. He had been studying architecture in Germany for two years and got a degree in civil engineering. He became a celibate priest ordained under the monastic name Grigoris Balakian. On 24 April 1915 he was among the group of 250 leading Armenian figures of Constantinople who were arrested and deported.

One group was deported to Ayaş. Balakian was deported to Çankırı, north-east of Ankara with the rest of the 190 other deportees from the capital. Only 16 of them would survive. He marched with 48 deportees from Çankırı in the direction of Deir ez-Zor in the Syrian desert. On the way Balakian won the confidence of captain of constabulary Shukri Bey and learned about the Ottoman government's plan to exterminate the whole Armenian population. Balakian was able to flee toward Islahie. He joined a group of workers on the Bagdad-railway where Turkish deserters did forced labor alongside Armenian refugees. While Armenian workers between Marash and Bartche were being slain, Balakian fled to another construction site on the Bagdad railway. He was helped by German engineers and finally succeeded – disguised as Herr Bernstein – in escaping from Constantinople to Paris.

At the 1921 trial in Berlin against Soghomon Tehlirian, the murderer of Talât Pasha, Balakian appeared as a witness for the defendant together with Johannes Lepsius. Soghomon Tehlirian was ultimately acquitted.

Balakian became prelate of Manchester, London and finally bishop of Marseille. Two churches were built under his guidance in Marseille and Nice (St. Mary, 1928) as well as a number of chapels and schools. He died in Marseille.

Balakian is the granduncle of literary critics Anna Balakian (an expert on symbolism and surrealism who chaired New York University's Department of Comparative Literature) and Nona Balakian (an editor at the New York Times Sunday Book Review and a founder of the National Book Critics Circle) as well as the great-granduncle of Peter Balakian, an Armenian-American writer and winner of the 2016 Pulitzer Prize for Poetry.

== Achievements ==
Balakian's memoirs in Armenian Golgotha are an important eyewitness account of the genocide. He describes his experiences during the deportation. Balakian was one of the few surviving leaders of the Armenian community who gave an account of the deportation.

Komitas Vartapet belonged to the same group of detainees as Balakian. His information about the traumatization of the famous composer and founder of modern Armenian classical music are of eminent importance. (Note: Komitas evaded further persecution upon the intervention of a powerful Turkish friend. His psychological situation deteriorated rapidly following the deportation and massacres. He died in 1935 in an asylum in Paris.)

== Works ==
- Նկարագրութիւն Անիի ավերակներուն (Description of the Ruins of Ani). Constantinople, 1910. — view online (archived)
- Հայ Գողգոթան Armenian Golgotha; Armenian original], vol. 1, Mekhitarist-Congregation, Vienna 1922; Vol. 2, Imprimerie Araxes, Paris 1959; French translation : Le Golgotha arménien, Le cercle d'écrits caucasiens, La Ferté-Sous-Jouarre 2002 (vol. 1) ISBN 2-913564-08-9, 2004 (vol. 2) ISBN 2-913564-13-5; English trans. Peter Balakian (his grandnephew) and Aris Sevag. Armenian Golgotha. New York: Alfred A. Knopf, 2009. ISBN 978-1-4000-9677-0.

== See also ==
- Witnesses and testimonies of the Armenian genocide
- Armenian notables deported from the Ottoman capital in 1915

== Sources ==
- Rita Soulahian Kuyumjian Archeology of Madness. Komitas. Portrait of an Armenian Icon 2001 (p. 116) ISBN 0-9535191-7-1
- Wolfgang Gust Der Völkermord an den Armeniern 1915/16. Dokumente aus dem Politischen Archiv des deutschen Auswärtigen Amts Verlag zu Klampen, 2005, ISBN 3-934920-59-4
- Peter Balakian Black Dog of Fate 1997, ISBN 0-7679-0254-8,
- Grigoris Palakjan Das armenische Golgatha German article translated from the original Armenian text in Pogrom May 1980.
