= Ozone Journal =

2015 poetry collection by Peter Balakian

Ozone Journal is a 2016 Pulitzer Prize winning work by Peter Balakian.

First edition

The title poem of Balakian's Ozone Journal is a sequence of 54 short sections, "each a poem in itself, recounting the speaker's memory of excavating the bones of Armenian genocide victims in the Syrian desert with a crew of television journalists in 2009."

The long poem “Ozone Journal” is a sequel to Balakian's “A Train-Ziggurat Elegy” (2010). While excavating the remains of Armenian genocide survivors in the Syrian desert with a TV crew, the persona navigates his own memory of New York City in a decade (the 1980s) of crisis. Ozone Journal creates inventive lyrical insight in a global age of danger and uncertainty.

According to Bruce Smith, in this book "Balakian masterfully does the thing nobody else does which is to derange history into poetry, to make poetry painting, to make painting culture, to make culture living, and with a historical depth that finds the right experience in language."

The Pulitzer board said that Balakian's poems "bear witness to the old losses and tragedies that undergird a global age of danger and uncertainty."

== Links ==
- Ozone Journal
- What you need to know about Peter Balakian, the new Pulitzer Prize-winning poet
