= Bajakian =

Bajakian is a surname. Notable people with the surname include:

- Aram Bajakian (born 1977), American guitarist
- Clint Bajakian (born 1962), American video game composer and musician
- Mike Bajakian (born 1974), American football coach

== See also ==
- Balakian
