= Sanasarian College =

Former Armenian college in the Ottoman Empire in present day Turkey

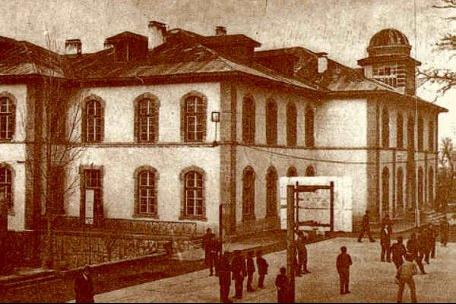
- Established: 1881
- Location: Erzurum, Ottoman Empire

The Sanasarian College (Armenian: Սանասարեան վարժարան, Turkish: Sanasaryan Koleji) was an Armenian-language educational institution in the city of Erzurum (called Karin by Armenians), Ottoman Empire founded in 1881 by an Armenian merchant, Mkrtich Sanasarian. Its students were children of primary and secondary school age. It also had a pedagogical department for the training of Armenian teachers and a trade school.

== Description ==
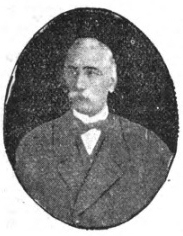
Mkrtich Sanasarian, founder of the Sanasarian College

It was a school of high grade which consisted of teachers who were mostly educated in Germany. The college had a nine-year course, with a high grade education that was taught. The school lasted until the Armenian genocide, when most of the teachers were killed and the building was ruined. Sanasarian college was a foremost institution for Armenian culture and education in the eastern provinces during the decades before World War I.

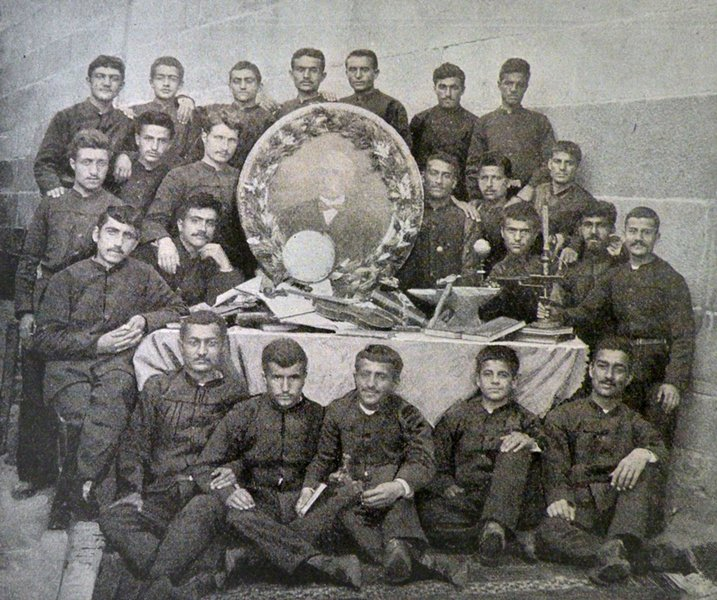
Graduates of the Sanasarian College

English explorer, writer, and natural historian Isabella Bird (1831–1904) described the college as follows:

One of the most interesting sights in Erzerum is the Sanassarian College, founded and handsomely endowed by the liberality of an Armenian merchant. The fine buildings are of the best construction, and are admirably suited for educational purposes, and the equipments are of the latest and most complete description. The education and the moral and intellectual training are of a very high type, and the personal influence of the three directors, who were educated in Germany and England, altogether "makes for righteousness." The graduation course is nine years. The students, numbering 120, wear a uniform, and there is no distinction of class among them. They are, almost without exception, manly, earnest, and studious, and are full of enthusiasm and esprit de corps. Much may be hoped for in the future from the admirable moral training and thorough education given in this college, which is one of the few bright spots in Armenia.

After the Armenian genocide, and when the property was abandoned, the Sanasarian College was chosen as the location for the Erzurum Congress.

== Legal status ==
In 2012, the Armenian Patriarchate of Constantinople appealed to a court in Ankara for the return of the properties owned by the Sanasarian College. These properties include nine plots of land in Erzurum, a garden house and vast farmland in the village of Aghveren, two plots in the village of Gez, and a large commercial property known as Sanasarian Han in the Sirkeci district of Istanbul. The court proceedings are still pending.

== Notable graduates ==
- Karekin Pastermadjian
- Grigoris Balakian
- Vartkes Serengülian
- Vartan Makhokhian

== See also ==
- Nersisian School
- Education in the Ottoman Empire
