= The Burning Tigris =

- Author: Peter Balakian
- Language: English
- Genre: History
- Publisher: HarperCollins
- Publication date: 2003
- Publication place: United States
- Pages: 465
- ISBN: 978-0-06-019840-4
- OCLC: 51653350
- Dewey Decimal: 956.6/2015 21
- LC Class: DS195.5 .B353 2003

The Burning Tigris: The Armenian Genocide and America's Response is a book written by Peter Balakian, and published in 2003. It details the Armenian genocide, the events leading up to it, and the events following it. In particular, Balakian focuses on the American response to the persecution and genocide of the Armenians in the Ottoman Empire from 1894 to 1923.

== Summary ==
The book begins with the state of the Ottoman Empire in the 1880s. Abdul Hamid II came to power in 1876, and there are many issues in the country that he is expected to solve. Specifically, the empire was losing money and land. Abdul Hamid II blamed these issues on non-Muslims in the country, and in particular, the Armenians. Over the course of the 1890s laws are passed limiting the rights of Armenians in the Ottoman Empire. By the early 20th century, there was extreme overtaxing, robbery, and murder against Armenians, all going with no repercussion. The government began supporting these actions by creating the mostly Kurdish Hamidiye regiments, who largely made their living by robbing the Armenians.

Owing to the "Macedonian Question", a state of low-level civil war in Ottoman Macedonia and the empire's chronic failing finances, Abdul Hamid II lost popularity, leading to a popular revolution in August 1908, set off by an erroneous rumor that a summit between King Edward VII and the Emperor Nicholas II had led a secret Anglo-Russian agreement to partition the Ottoman Empire. The garrison in Salonika (modern Thessaloniki, Greece) declared itself against Abdul-Hamid and marched on Constantinople, only for Abdul-Hamid to proclaim he had been misled by his "evil" advisers and to announce that the constitution of 1876 he himself had suspended would be restored. A brief moment of joy swept across the Ottoman Empire and most Armenians supported the Young Turk revolution, believing that the restoration of the constitution would make them equal. Abdul Hamid II was overthrown in April 1909 by a revolutionary group called the Committee of Union and Progress, better known as the Young Turks, after he attempted a coup aimed at taking back the power he had lost in 1908. The new regime promised a fresh start, saying that henceforward all of the peoples of the Ottoman Empire would be equal.

The Armenians by and large welcomed the new government, thinking that they would be treated as equals once more. Instead, the new government ordered massacres' and death marches starting in 1915. Armenians were rounded up and killed. The ones lucky enough to escape the massacres were deported to the vilayet (province) of Ottoman Syria (modern Lebanon and Syria). The United States Red Cross was permitted into the country starting in 1915. The help they could provide was limited. The genocide received an immense account of media coverage in the United States, leading to the Near East Relief Committee being set up to save the Armenians in September 1915. The Near East Relief Committee commissioned the first film about the genocide Ravished Armenia (known as The Auction of Souls in Europe), a film telling the true story of Aurora Mardiganian. Ordinary Americans contributed about $100 million US dollars to the Near East Relief while over a 1, 000 Americans, most of them women, went to the Middle East to serve as aid workers.

The United States Government was also considering trying to help the Armenians by creating an independent Armenia after the First World War. Woodrow Wilson and some members of Congress supported this idea, but it never worked fully because the United States had oil interests in the Ottoman Empire and wanted to remain on good terms. What was left of Armenia instead became a state in the Soviet Union. The United States had ambitious plans for what to do with the Armenians, but economic issues prevented the United States from helping in any meaningful way. Other European powers at the time also did not do much. More than one hundred high-ranking government officials from the Ottoman Empire were put on trial for war crimes, fewer than 20 were convicted, and none of them served their full sentences.

== Reception ==
In a mixed review for The New York Times, Belinda Cooper called the book "timely and welcome" but criticized it for lack of cohesion and analysis, writing that it "presents a disorganized, largely descriptive narrative that ultimately raises more questions than it answers". Cooper wrote that Balakian leaves some questions unaddressed, such as the role of Turks who opposed the genocide and of Armenians who continued to declare their loyalty to the Ottoman Empire. Cooper wrote that Balakian provided an "unremitting depiction of irrational barbarism by sociopathic Turkish leaders and a fanatical population against a generally unresisting minority" but "only a superficial sense of the changes in the centuries-old relationship between Turks and Armenians that could unleash such violence".

In a review in The Boston Globe, John Shattuck wrote: "The Burning Tigris has major weaknesses, including its cursory explanation of what drove the Turkish government to exterminate the Armenians and its limited account of how Turkey managed for so long to block all efforts to tell the truth. Nevertheless, by reintroducing the voices of Americans who spoke up for the Armenians a century ago, Balakian honors the international human rights tradition in the United States, pointing toward the need for international laws and institutions that are now so discredited by Washington. As one of these voices, early feminist writer and champion of the Armenian cause Charlotte Perkins Gilman wrote in 1903, "National crimes demand international law, to restrain, prohibit, punish, best of all, to prevent.""

In a review in The Minneapolis Star Tribune, Stephen Feinstein wrote: "Balakian makes it clear that the discourse about Armenia has not ended: Unlike the perpetrators of the Nazi Holocaust, no Turkish high official was brought to trial. And the systematic suppression and denial continues. Turkey, a NATO member and U.S. ally, has intervened in congressional attempts to label the genocide according to U.N. convention, and to this day prohibits discourse about its own history and prosecutes teachers who tell the story in their classrooms. Balakian's book should serve as a warning: Suppressed history has a way of returning with a vengeance. One can only hope that Americans, concerned with the Armenian cause in the past, will be receptive to it again, and that Turkey, long in denial of its past, will strengthen its own democratic system by dealing with it. Although Balakian's research is not based on original documents in Turkish or the languages of the region, he has succeeded in writing a lucid and engaging account that serves as a useful entry point for readers unfamiliar with a complex subject. The story of Armenia is a reminder that we live in an age of genocide, and that discourse about this history and establishment of early warning systems is perhaps the only way to prevent it from recurring."

In a critical review in The Independent, Mark Mazower wrote: "The horror of it all emanates vividly from the pages of Peter Balakian's new history. The sheer scale of the massacres has an overwhelming impact and his access to the accounts of survivors and diplomats, and his understanding of Armenian culture and society, help bring to life the world that was lost with the victims. It quickly becomes clear that the Holocaust was not the first such onslaught on an entire community; indeed, the parallels with that event are frequently underlined." However, Mazower harshly criticised Balkian for what he felt was his morality play view of the genocide with the Armenians as the pure, righteous victims being pursued by "malevolent perpetrators led by psychopaths such as Sultan Abdul Hamid". Mazower wrote that he believed that the break-down in relations between the Sublime Porte and the Armenians was to a large extent the responsibility of the latter as he accused Armenian revolutionaries of assassinating Ottoman officials out of the hope that the Ottomans would commit atrocities that would lead to great power intervention on their behalf just had happened in the Balkans. Likewise, Mazower wrote the Ottoman charge that the Armenians were a pro-Russian fifth column, through exaggerated, did have a basis in fact. Mazower wrote that over a million Muslim refugees had fled to the Ottoman Empire from the Caucasus and the Balkans between 1860 and 1913, making the Muslim rage against Christians understandable, through not justified. Finally, Mazower wrote that after the Ottoman Empire entered the First World War that the Ottoman forces had suffered a series of defeats with an invasion of the Russian Caucasus ending in a disaster while the Allies had landed in Gallipoli, which was the first stage of a plan to capture Constantinople, making it that appear in the spring of 1915 that the Sublime Porte was faced with destruction. Mazower wrote: "None of this in any way justifies what happened to the Armenians, but it underlines the existential crisis that faced the empire's young and arrogant leadership, humiliated on the battlefield, their grand strategy in ruins...The Burning Tigris remains, understandably enough, a work of denunciation. Even so, more than denunciation will be needed to help us make sense of what happened."

In a review in The Daily Telegraph, Brendan Simms wrote that Balakian "...retells the story of the Armenian massacres in an accessible way. It is not for the faint-hearted. In places, the narrative becomes an almost unbearable catalogue of cruelties and killings. If the author seems to dwell on these, the reason lies in a revisionist campaign to minimise the scope of and intention behind the massacres, sponsored by some otherwise rather eminent historians." Sims noted that Henry Morgenthau Sr., the American ambassador to the Sublime Porte, was outraged by the genocide, making him into one of the book's heroes, but on the whole, the State Department was not inclined to interfere with the internal affairs of the Ottoman Empire, despite all of Morgenthau's anguish. Sims wrote he felt that Balakian was too harsh in his criticism of President Woodrow Wilson for not doing enough to stop the genocide, noting it was too easy for former presidents such as Theodore Roosevelt to call for Congress to declare war on the Ottoman Empire. Sims further noted that as the Battle of Gallipoli had dramatically shown that in even in 1915 the Ottomans still had a formidable military that defeated an attempt by an Anglo-Australian-New Zealand-Indian-French force to seize the Gallipoli peninsula. Sims noted that the best way to stop the Armenian genocide was to defeat the Ottoman Empire, which finally happened in 1918, which led him to argue that Balakian was being too glib in asserting that the United States could have done more to stop the genocide.

== Legacy ==
In 2013, the American scholar Jerry Sigman wrote it is widely asserted today that if more attention had been paid to the Armenian Genocide in World War One, then the Shoah in World War Two would have been prevented. Sigman wrote that the Bulgarian Horrors of 1876, when the Ottomans repressed an uprising in Bulgaria by unleashing the bashi-bazouks (a collection of irregulars who followed the Ottoman Army on the campaigns) together with Kurdish tribesmen on the hapless Bulgarians, received a massive amount of media attention in both the United States and Europe at the time, but the only power that took action was Russia, which belatedly declared war on the Ottoman Empire in 1877, after various international conferences failed to stop the violence. Sigman described the impasse created in Britain with the Liberals under William Gladstone denouncing the Bulgarian Horrors while the Conservative prime minister Benjamin Disraeli justified the Bulgarian Horrors as something the Bulgarians brought down on themselves by revolting against the Ottoman Empire as creating the template for Western responses for genocide and atrocities in general. Sigman wrote that for Disraeli the most important thing to support the Ottoman Empire as a bulwark against Russia, which led his government to place realpolitik ahead of morality, which he argued was all typical of Western responses to atrocities in the 20th century.

Sigman further noted that the Armenian genocide was not ignored at the time, noting that books such as The Burning Tigris had overwhelming established that the American media did not ignore the subject at the time, and instead on the contrary provided saturation coverage of the genocide. Sigman wrote that despite all of the media coverage of the Armenian genocide, it failed to stop the Shoah, leading him to conclude: "Based on the information provided, it is clear that the Jewish Holocaust would have occurred regardless, as it happened in spite of the massive amounts of publicity about the Armenian Genocide that saturated the U.S. and Western European presses." Sigman noted that more recently that the Rwandan genocide of 1994 also received saturation coverage in the American and European media, and unlike the Armenian genocide was broadcast live as various television crews recorded the killings first-hand, and yet the world still did nothing. Sigman argued that the issue was not knowledge of genocide as it is commonly claimed, but rather the willingness to act against genocide, which he noted has been mostly lacking.

== Books and articles ==
- Sigman, Jerry (Summer 2013). "Even if the World Had Paid Attention, Nothing Would Have Changed: If the Armenian Genocide Had Not Been Forgotten". Saber and Scroll Journal. 111 (111): 107–116.
