= Toni Morrison Achievement Award =

Annual literary award

- Awarded for: "an institution that has, over time, made significant contributions to book culture"
- Sponsored by: National Book Critics Circle
- First award: 2021

The Toni Morrison Achievement Award, established in 2021, is an annual literary award presented by the National Book Critics Circle to "an institution that has, over time, made significant contributions to book culture".

== Winners ==
Award winners
Year	Recipient	Ref.
2021	Cave Canem Foundation	
2022	City Lights Bookstore	
2023	American Library Association	
2024	Third World Press	
2025	National Public Radio (NPR)	
2025	Public Broadcasting Service (PBS)	
