= Peter Balakian =

American poet

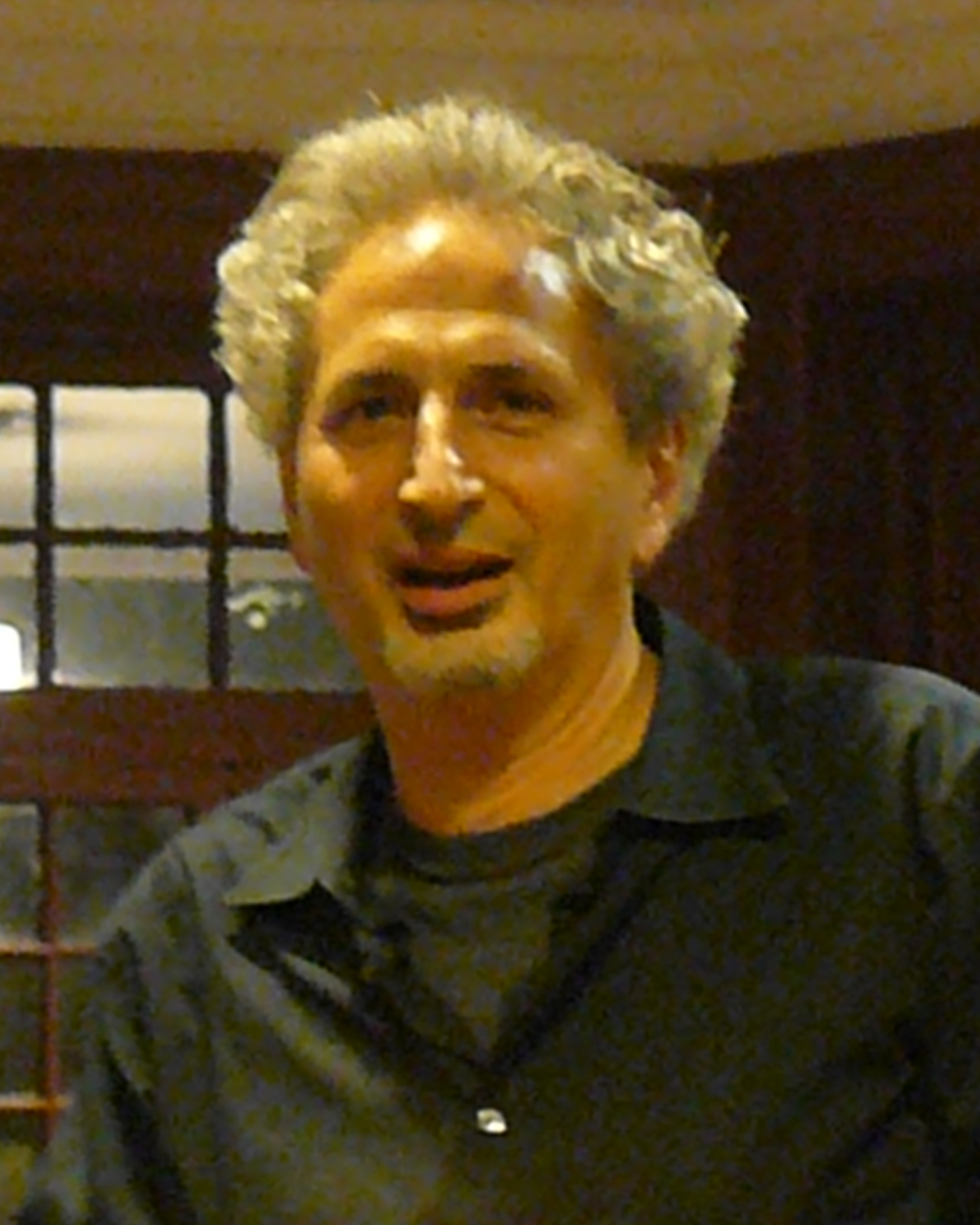
- Peter Balakian in 2011
- Born: June 13, 1951 (age 75); Teaneck, New Jersey, U.S.
- Education: Bucknell University (BA); New York University (MA); Brown University (PhD)
- Occupations: Poet, nonfiction writer
- Writing career
- Genres: poetry, memoir, essay, literary criticism
- Notable awards: Pulitzer Prize for Poetry; PEN/Albrand Award for Memoir; Raphael Lemkin Prize; Sp; Presidential Medal, Republic of Armenia
- Website: peterbalakian.com

Signature
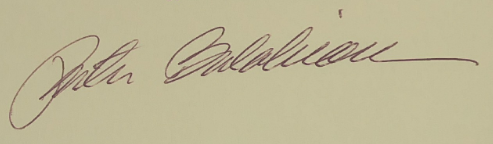

Peter Balakian (born June 13, 1951) is an American writer of poetry and prose whose work includes non-fiction scholarship about Armenian history. He is the authored the 2016 Pulitzer prize winning book of poems Ozone Journal, the memoir Black Dog of Fate, winner of the PEN/Albrand award in 1998 and The Burning Tigris: The Armenian Genocide and America's Response, winner of the 2005 Raphael Lemkin Prize and a New York Times best seller (October 2003). Both prose books were New York Times Notable Books. Since 1980 he has taught at Colgate University where he is the Donald M and Constance H Rebar Professor of the Humanities in the department of English and Director of Creative Writing.

== Early life ==
Peter Balakian, son of physician and sports medicine inventor Gerard Balakian and Arax Aroosian Balakian who holds a B.A. in Chemistry from Bucknell University and worked for Ciba-Geigy Pharmaceutical Company before her marriage. Balakian was born in Teaneck New Jersey and grew up there and in Tenafly, New Jersey. He attended Tenafly public schools, graduated from Englewood School For Boys (now Dwight Englewood School). He earned a B.A. from Bucknell University, and M.A. from NYU, and a Ph.D. in American Civilization from Brown University. At Bucknell, Balakian studied with the poet and novelist Jack Wheatcroft.

== Career ==
He taught for two years at the Dwight-Englewood School where he met his lifetime friend, the poet Bruce Smith with whom he founded the poetry journal Graham House Review (1979–96). In 1976 Balakian began his doctoral studies in the American Civilization Program at Brown University where he wrote his dissertation on the poet Theodore Roethke under the direction of Hyatt H. Waggoner and David Hirsch. His dissertation was later published as Theodore Roethke's Far Fields (LSU 1989). He joined the faculty at Colgate University in 1980 where he has taught in the English department since; he was co-founder of the Creative Writing Program and has been the director of the program since 2002. He is the Donald M. and Constance H. Rebar Professor of the Humanities in the department of English. He was also the first director of Colgate's Center for Ethics and World Societies in 1999. In 2019 he received Colgate's Jerome Balmuth Distinguished Teaching Award.

David Wojahn in Tikkun (Spring 2016) wrote that, "few American poets of the boomer generation have explored the interstices of public and personal history as deeply and urgently as has Balakian, and his significance as a poet of social consciousness is complemented by his work in other genres."

Balakian's second book of poems Sad Days of Light (1983), dealt the history, trauma and memory of a global catastrophe-the Armenian Genocide-and its impact across generations. Shirley Horner in The New York Times wrote, "Like William Carlos Williams in Paterson, Balakian displays a powerful talent in resurrecting the past, lyrically, transforming the story of his heritage into an affirmative history for all survivors."

In The Christian Science Monitor, Steven Ratiner wrote, "It is in its restrained but intimate tone, its faithfulness to the small human detail, that the poetry reaches its broadest context. As we witness the destruction of a kitchen or the anguish of one old woman, we somehow come to understand the meaning of holocaust.''

His collection Ziggurat (2010) dealt with the aftermath of 9/11 by excavating the ruins of the Sumerian past. The British poet Carol Rumens in The Guardian wrote, "The power of the poems in Ziggurat is in the range of experiences and knowledge they respond to, the linguistic energies deployed and the skill with which the narrative is layered, so that it resonates not only as historical commentary, but with pertinence to the present moment."

In an interview with the New York Times after winning the Pulitzer Prize in April, 2016, Balakian said, "poetry in particular has a great capacity to absorb history, and to make historical memory a dynamic contemporary force." To The Washington Post Balakian said, "I'm interested in pushing the form of poetry, pushing it to have more stakes, more openness to the complexity of contemporary experience."

Balakian's work as a poet and a prose writer has also influenced modern Armenian literature. Writing in World Literature Today ( January 2016), Keith Garibian called Balakian, "the preeminent Armenian writer in English today, whether the genre is poetry, memoir, or history or literary criticism." About Balakian's recent book of poems No Sign (2022), Ilya Kaminsky writes: “Balakian understands the bewildered music of our times, and No Sign, more than any other contemporary book of poetry, teaches us about the properties of time; we are inside the speech that is addressing time and opposing it, witnessing it, and walking two steps ahead. This ‘time-sense’ is explored with depth in the brilliant title poem. Balakian is able to praise the world though he knows its ‘bitter history.’ And praise he does! The lyricism here is of utter beauty. No Sign is a splendid, necessary book.”—Ilya Kaminsky, author of Deaf Republic

== Prose ==
Balakian's memoir Black Dog of Fate (1997) dealt with an Armenian American boy's coming of age in affluent suburban New Jersey of the 1950s and '60s as he comes to uncover the unspoken trauma of the Armenian genocide his grandparents survived. The book received the PEN/Albrand Award for memoir, was a New York Times Notable Book, and a book of the year for Publishers Weekly.

Sybil Steinberg editor at Publishers Weekly on the Charlie Rose Show noted that Balakian's memoir was pushing against the self-obsessed American memoir and creating a new orientation for the genre. Joyce Carol Oates in The New Yorker called it "a richly imagined memoir, carefully documented, that asks painful questions of us all." The Philadelphia Inquirer called it "a landmark chapter in the literature of witness." Dinitia Smith's feature on Balakian in the New York Times "A Poet Knits Together Memories of Armenian Horrors," credited Black Dog of Fate with opening up a new space in memory culture.

His 2004 book The Burning Tigris: The Armenian Genocide and America's Response debuted at No. 4 on the New York Times bestseller list. In this narrative history, Balakian brought together two stories: the Ottoman Turkish Empire's eradication of its Armenian Christian minority population of more than two million people during the Hamidian massacres of the 1890s and in the genocide of 1915, and a little known history of how Americans became international human rights activists for the Armenians during the period of 1895 to 1925 and launched the first international human rights mission in American history.

Theodore Roethke's Far Fields was published in 1988. Balakian's Vise and Shadow: Essays on the Lyric Imagination, Poetry, Art, and Culture was published in 2015. His collaborative translations from the Armenian include: Bloody News From My Friend by Siamanto (with Nevart Yaghlian); Armenian Golgotha, a memoir, by Grigoris Balakian (with Aris Sevag) (2009); The Ruins of Ani by Krikor Balakian with Aram Arkun.

== Public Intellectual Work ==
For decades, Balakian has worked to combat the Turkish government's denial and propaganda campaigns which is aimed at suppressing the history of the Armenian Genocide and pressuring the US and other nations not to acknowledge it. Balakian has argued that the Armenian Genocide became the template for other genocides which were carried out in a modern modality and he has also argued that it was an influence on the Nazi genocide of the Jews of Europe. (The Burning Tigris, 2003).

His work with fellow writers and scholars Robert Jay Lifton, Susan Sontag, Deborah Lipstadt, Elie Wiesel, Samantha Power, and Robert Melson resulted in changes on how the Armenian genocide was covered in the media and dealt with in the classroom. In 1996, Balakian and Lifton circulated a national petition that was published in the Chronicle of Higher Education, "Princeton Accused of Fronting For the Turkish Government," calling attention to Turkish efforts to intimidate scholars and corrupt academic appointments with the case of Heath Lowry at Princeton as an example.

In March 2004, Balakian, Samantha Power and Holocaust scholar Robert Melson met with Executive Editor Bill Keller at the New York Times in a meeting that changed how the Armenian Genocide is covered by the Times. Balakian co-authored a letter about the issue published in the Times. In 2005, Balakian and Elie Wiesel had a similar meeting with Associated Press foreign desk editor Larry Heinzerling, also resulting in a policy change.

In August 2020, Balakian was a founding member of the group Writers for Democratic Action. The founding steering committee included Todd Gitlin, Paul Auster, James Carroll, Siri Hustvedt, Askold Melnyczuk, Natasha Trethewey, Carolyn Forché, Sophie Auster, Julia Lattimer and Shuchi Saraswat.

About President Biden's statement of acknowledgment of the Armenian Genocide on April 24, 2021, Balakian wrote in an op-ed in The Washington Post "No American president until Biden has had the courage to use the word "genocide" for fear of angering Turkey's leaders and damaging relations with a powerful ally, even one with an abominable human rights record." His appearances in the media on the issue include: 60 Minutes, "The Struggle for History" with Bob Simon; the Charlie Rose Show; Fresh Air with Terry Gross; ABC World News Tonight with Peter Jennings; National Public Radio's Weekend Edition and All Things Considered, and in various documentaries including the PBS documentary The Armenian Genocide ( 2006 directed by Andrew Goldberg), and the documentary Intent To Destroy, directed by Joe Berlinger.

Balakian's political and cultural commentary and op-eds have appeared in The Washington Post, The Guardian, Salon, LA Times, Boston Globe, and The Daily Beast, and his essays about art and literature have appeared in Art In America, Poetry, New York Times Magazine, Tikkun, Literary Hub, The Chronicle of Higher Education, and many scholarly journals. In addition to his book prizes, Balakian's other awards include a Guggenheim Fellowship, an NEA Fellowship, the Presidential Medal, and the Movses Khoranatsi medal from Armenia, and the Spendlove Prize for Social Justice, Tolerance, and Diplomacy.

In a 2008 article in the New York Times Magazine, Balakian revealed that he had pocketed bones and other remains from an alleged Armenian burial ground in Der Zor, Syria and brought them back with him to the United States. The article drew criticism from scholars, with one of them going so far as to call the act "grave-robbing."

== Personal life ==
Balakian was married to Helen Kebabian, director of government, foundation, and corporate relations at Colgate University.

Balakian is the nephew of former New York Times Book Review editor Nona Balakian (1918-1991), literary scholar Anna Balakian (1915-1997), and great-great nephew of Grigoris Balakian (1878-1934), memoirist and nonfiction writer and Bishop in the Armenian Apostolic Church. Grigoris Balakian wrote one of the most important survivor memoirs of the Armenian Genocide, Armenian Golgotha.

== Works ==
Poetry

- Father Fisheye (1979) ISBN 9780935296082, OCLC 6387100
- Sad Days of Light (1983) ISBN 9780935296334, OCLC 8727659
- Reply From Wilderness Island (1988)
- Dyer's Thistle (1996) ISBN 9780887482328, OCLC 34552212
- June-Tree: New and Selected Poems, 1974–2000 (2001)
- Ziggurat (2010) ISBN 9780226035642, OCLC 490081846
- Ozone Journal (2015)
- No Sign, University of Chicago Press, (2022)

Prose

- Theodore Roethke's Far Fields (1989) ISBN 9780807114896, OCLC 256162719
- Black Dog of Fate, A Memoir (1997) (translated into Armenian by Artem Harutyunyan, 2002) ISBN 9780465010196, OCLC 191926025
- The Burning Tigris: The Armenian Genocide and America's Response (2003)
- Vise and Shadow: Essays on the Lyric Imagination, Poetry, Art, and Culture (2015)

Translation

- Bloody News From My Friend, by Siamanto, translated by Peter Balakian and Nevart Yaghlian, introduction by Balakian (1996)
- Armenian Golgotha, by Grigoris Balakian, translated by Peter Balakian and Aris Sevag (2009)

Editor

- Ambassador Morgenthau's Story, preface by Robert Jay Lifton, introduction by Roger Smith, afterword by Henry Morgenthau III. (2003)
- A Slant of Light; Reflections on Jack Wheatcroft, edited by Peter Balakian and Bruce Smith, Bucknell University Press (2018)

Limited Editions

- Declaring Generations, linoleum engravings by Barnard Taylor ( 1981)
- Invisible Estate, woodcuts by Rosalyn Richards (1985)
- The Oriental Rug, linoleum engravings by Barnard Taylor (1986)
- The Children's Museum at Yad Vashem, illustrated by Colleen Shannon (1996)

(all from The Press of Appletree Alley, Lewisburg, PA)

Recordings

- Poetry on Record, 1888–2006: 98 Poets Read their Work (Tennyson, Whitman, Yeats, through Modernism to present). Four-CD set. Balakian reading "The History of Armenia"
