= Armenian Golgotha =

1922 memoir by Grigoris Balakian

- Author: Grigoris Balakian
- Language: Armenian
- Genre: Memoir
- Publisher: Vintage Books
- Publication date: 1922 & 1959
- Publication place: Germany (1922), France (1959)
- English publication date: 2009
- Pages: 509
- ISBN: 978-1-4000-9677-0

Armenian Golgotha (Armenian: Հայ Գողգոթան) is a memoir by the Armenian bishop Grigoris Balakian detailing his eyewitness account of the Armenian genocide. The memoir was released in two volumes. Volume 1, about his life prior to and during the Armenian genocide, was released in 1922. Volume 2, about his life as a fugitive after the Genocide, was released in 1959. Originally published in Armenian, the memoir was later published in various languages including an English translation by Peter Balakian, Balakian's great-nephew, with Aris Sevag.

== Reception ==
Upon the release of the English translation in 2009, many publications reviewed the account. The New Yorker referred to the account as "a fascinating first-hand testimony to a monumental crime." Elie Wiesel, the author best known for the memoir Night, referred to the account as "heartbreaking" because he believes that the memory presented by Balakian "must remain a lesson for more than one generation". The New Republic praised the account as "a powerful and important book" because "it takes place as one of the key first-hand sources for understanding the Armenian genocide". Writing for The Washington Post, Chris Bohjalian (a second-generation Armenian American) felt personally connected by understanding what happened to his great-grandparents. Bohjalian opined that Balakian's account was "rich with evidence of the Turkish government's complicity and its leaders' premeditation." Bohjalian also hoped that the account would be widely read.
