= Ara H. Hakobyan =

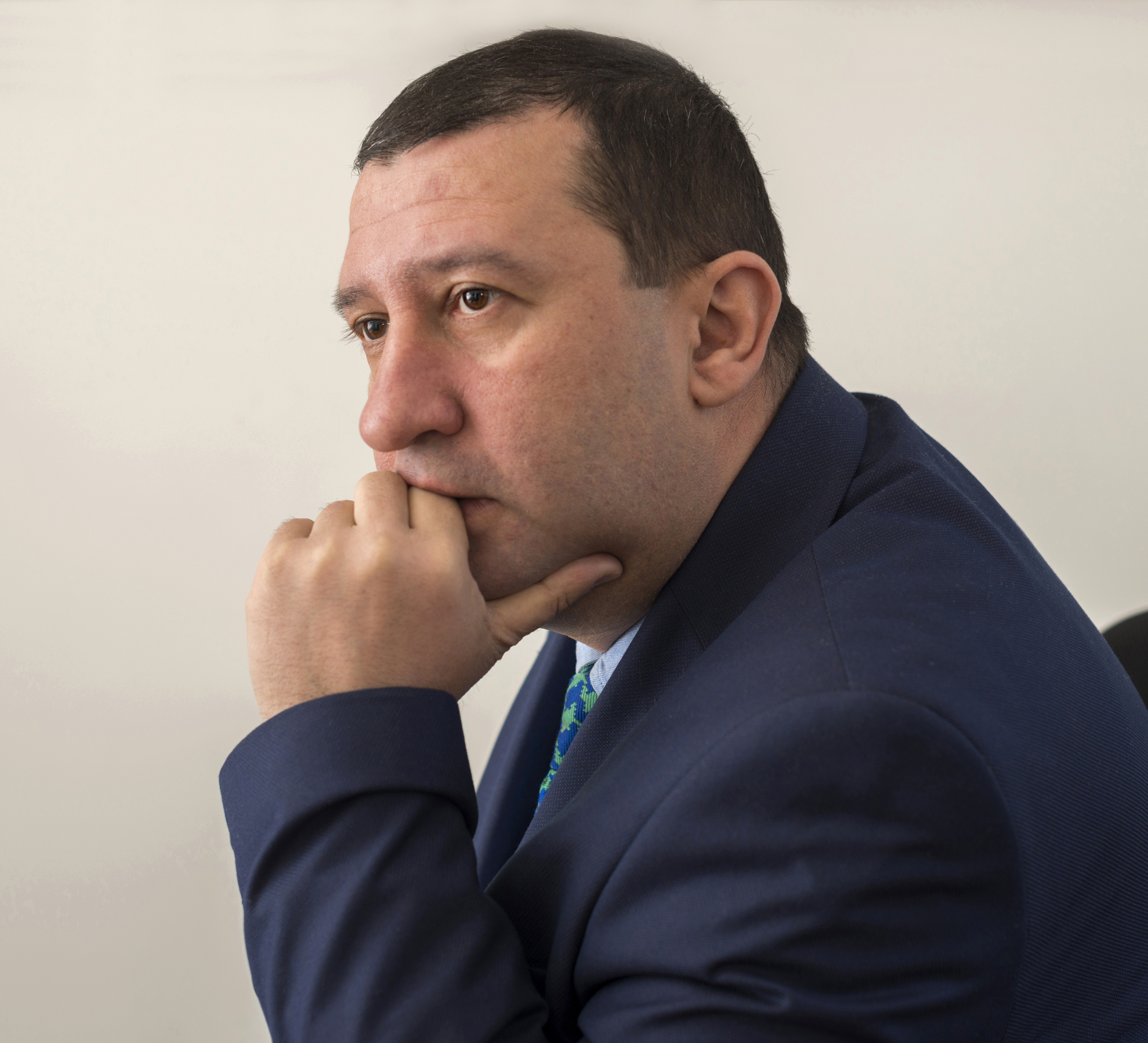
- Born: Ara H. Hakobyan; April 2, 1973 (age 53); Yerevan, Armenia
- Education: State Academy of Fine Arts of Armenia
- Known for: Painter, art critic

Ara H. Hakobyan (Armenian: Արա Հակոբյան; born April 2, 1973, in Yerevan), is an Armenian artist, art critic. Doctor of Sciences (Arts) (2017), Professor (2018). Member of Artist Union of the Republic of Armenian (1999).

== Biography ==
Ara H. Hakobyan was born in 1973 in Yerevan in the family of art historian Hravard Hakobyan. In 1997 Hakobyan graduated from the Yerevan State Academy of Arts, Department of Painting. During 1997-2000 he did his post-graduate studies at Khachatur Abovian Armenian State Pedagogical University. In 2001 he passed advanced course at Venetian Academy of Arts. Since 2002 Ara Hakobyan works at Khachatur Abovian Armenian State Pedagogical University, since 2008 he is the Head of History Theory and Culture of Arts Department Khachatur Abovian Armenian State Pedagogical University, since 2017 - Dean of Faculty Art Education.

== Exhibitions ==
Ara Hakobyan has participated in international exhibitions – award-winner for the best work at the exhibition of Armenian Artists Union (2002) – as well as has had numerous individual exhibitions:

- Venice (Italy, 2001)
- Museum of Hovhannes Tumanyan (Armenia, 2011)
- Embassy of the United States of America in Armenia (Armenia, 2013)
- Union of Painters of Armenia(2014)
- Museum of Armenian-Russian Friendship (2014)

== Publications ==
Among numerous scientific articles, reviews, monographs, books, and albums:

- “Vartan Makhokhian Marine painting”, Yerevan, 2004, monograph (in Armenian)
- “Vartan Makhokhian”, Yerevan, 2006, album (in Armenian)
- “Colour and Imagination Factors in Teaching Painting”, Yerevan, 2006, methodological guidelines (in Armenian)
- “Arsen Chabanian”, Yerevan, 2009, research-album (in Armenian)
- “Baghesh Amerdovla University and Plastic Arts in that Educational Institution”, Yerevan, 2012, monograph (in Armenian)
- “Painting in Armenian Schooling System”, Yerevan, 2015, methodological guidelines (in Armenian)
- “La Venezia del pittori armeni”, Yerevan, 2015, album (in Armenian and Italian)
- “Marine Artists of Armenian Origin”, Yerevan, 2017, monograph (in Armenian)

== Artworks ==
- “My Father’s Portrait” (1998)
- “My Mother” (2002)
- “Going to the village” (2003)
- “Flower sellers” (2011)
- “Baking bread” (2014)
- “Divine Liturgy” (2015)
- “On the beach” (2017)

== Gallery ==
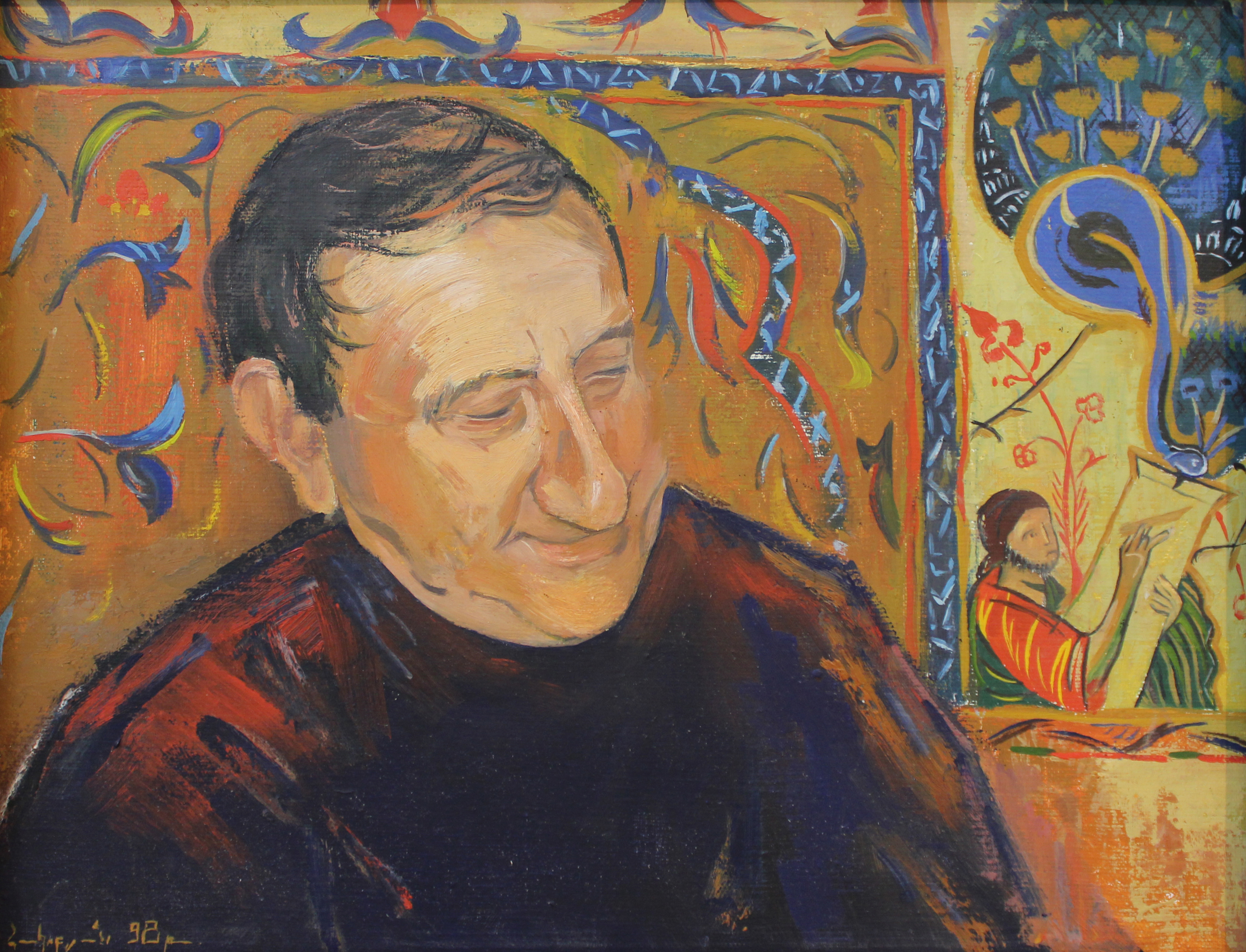
Portrait of Hravard Hakobyan

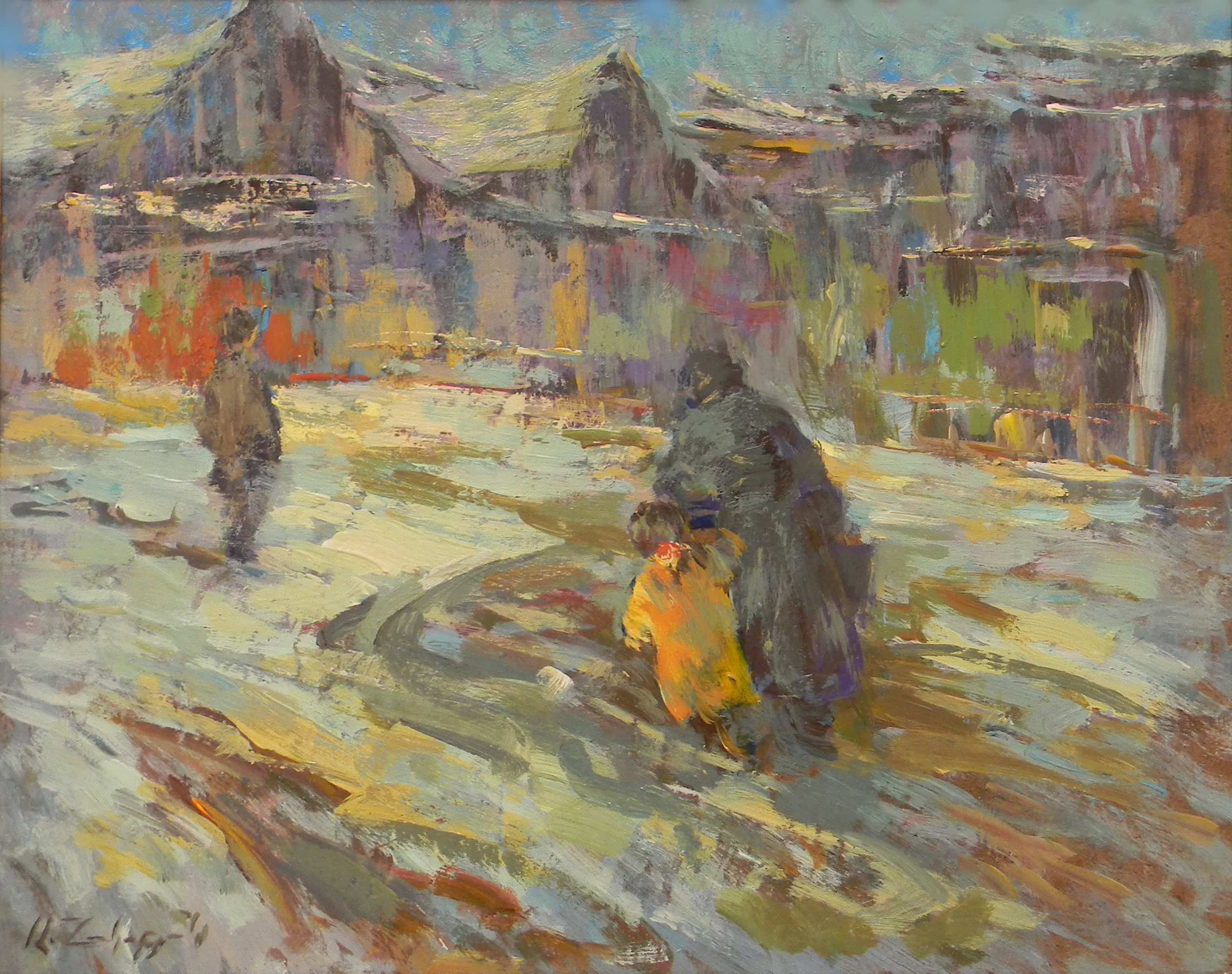
«Towards home»

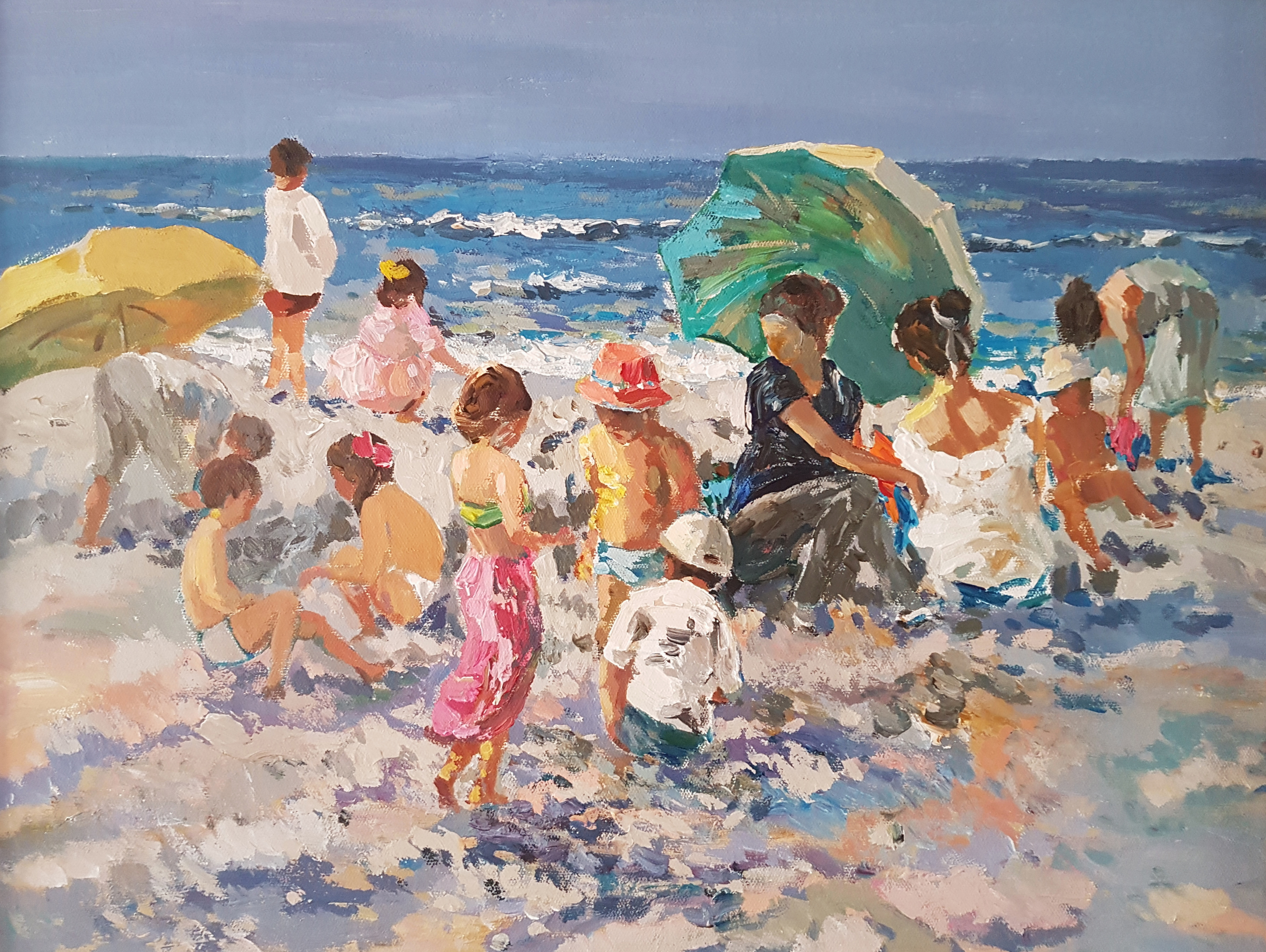
«Happy day»

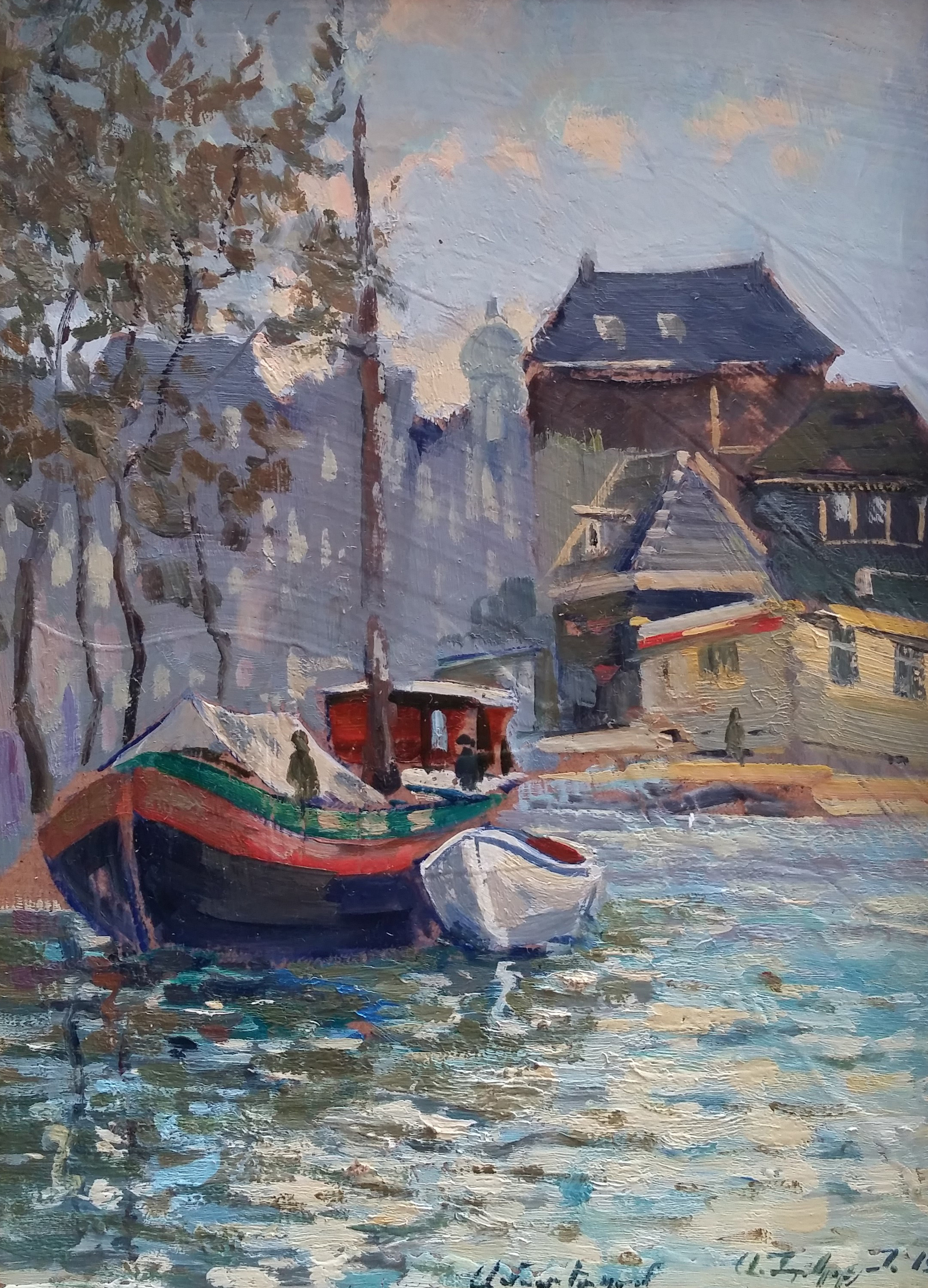
«Amsterdam»

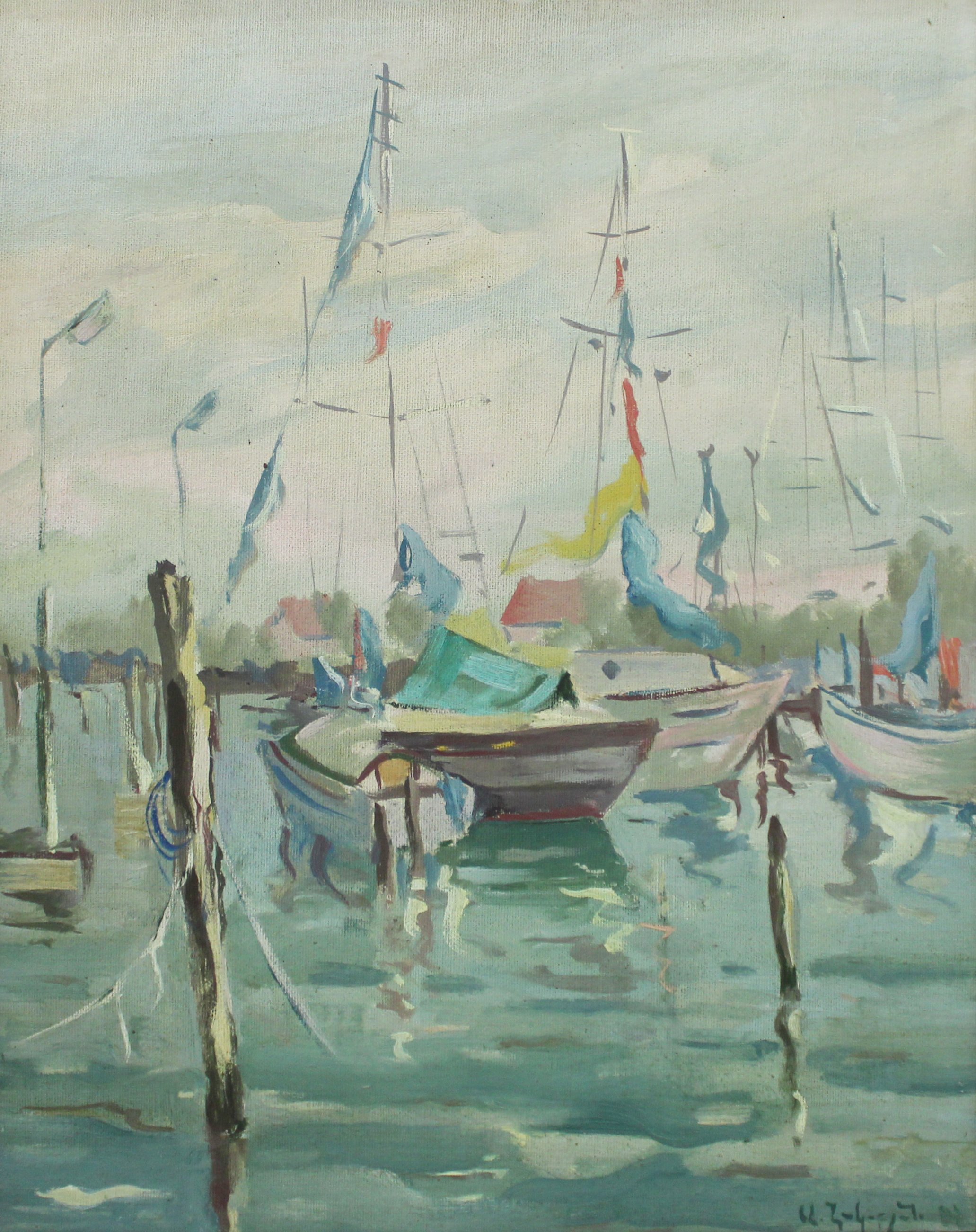
«Venice»
