= Vartan Makhokhian =

Armenian painter

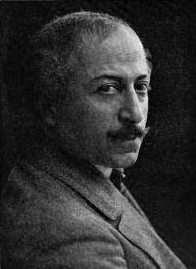
- Born: 31 May 1869; Trebizond, Ottoman Empire
- Died: 10 February 1937 (aged 67); Nice, France
- Education: Berlin Academy of Arts
- Notable work: Marine paintings
- Awards: Legion of Honour of Chevalier (Knight) degree

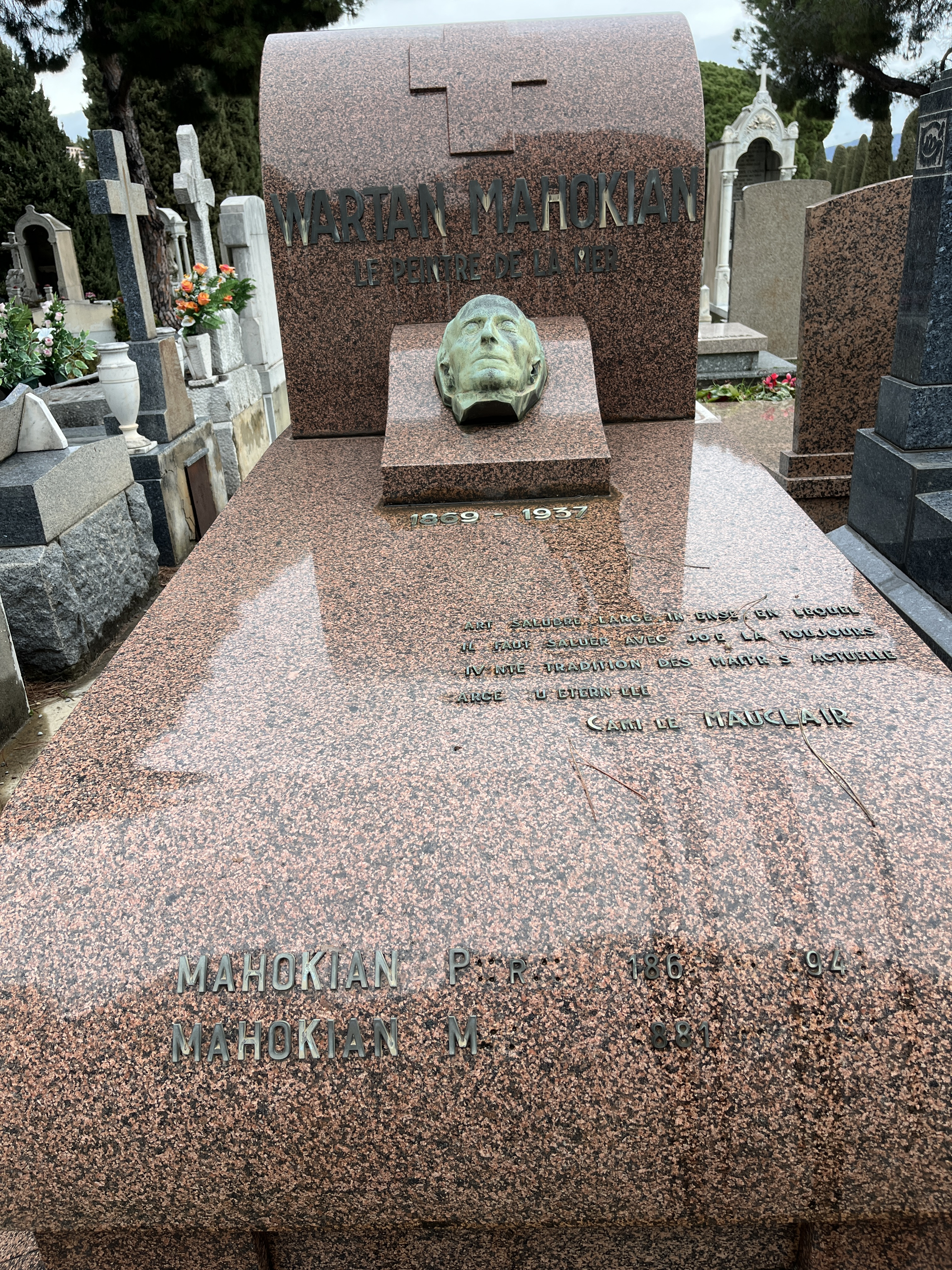
View of the grave of the artist in Caucade cemetery in Nice (France)

Vartan Makhokhian (Armenian: Վարդան Մախոխեան; 31 May 1869 – 10 February 1937) was an Armenian painter who lived in the Ottoman Empire and France and was known for his marine paintings. After completing his studies at the Berlin Academy of Arts, he traveled and exhibited his art in France, Germany, Egypt and elsewhere. His art is displayed in various museums throughout the world.

== Life and career ==
Vartan Makhokhian was born in Trabzon in the Ottoman Empire on 31 May 1869 to Armenian parents. His father, Aristakes Makhokhian, was a merchant who demanded that his two daughters and four sons be educated. In 1875, Makhokhian began his early education at a local Armenian school where he took an interest in drawing. He later attended the prestigious Sanasarian College in Erzurum, returning to Trabzon after five years of study. During his time spent at Sanasarian, Makhokhian learned to paint. He also learned to play the violin and studied music theory. Makhokhian's uncle persuaded him to pursue a career in art. In 1891, Makhokhian began studies at the Berlin Academy of Arts where he was trained under the directorship of Eugen Bracht and Hans Gude.

Makhokhian graduated from the academy in 1894 and traveled to the Crimea, where he met with renowned Russian Armenian painter Ivan Aivazovsky in Feodosia. While in Russia, Makhokhian painted various scenes of the sea. He returned to his native Trabzon in 1895 and witnessed the Hamidian massacres. He escaped first to Batum and then to Europe where he began exhibiting his art. One of his first exhibitions was in Berlin in 1900. In 1904 Makhokhian was accepted into the Berlin Artists' Association. He traveled to Egypt where he exhibited over 150 pieces of his artwork in Alexandria and Cairo. After a brief stop in Denmark, Makhokhian went to Italy, settled in Capri and continued painting there. He returned to Germany in 1907 and participated in various exhibitions Berlin, Düsseldorf, and Munich.

He returned to the Ottoman Empire in 1908 and settled in his hometown of Trabzon. He continued to paint there, but with the start of World War I and the Armenian genocide, Makhokhian moved to Nice, France in 1914, where he remained the rest of his life. He received French citizenship in 1927, two years after being awarded the Legion of Honor. He participated in the Paris Salon in 1921, 1922, and 1927. In 1931 a personal exhibition was held at the Palais de la Méditerranée in Nice which included 65 of his works. He also exhibited his works in Monte Carlo in 1932.

In 1915, in memory of those who died during the Armenian genocide, Makhokhian composed a symphony entitled The Sobbing of Armenia. It was first performed at Monte Carlo in 1918 and then played throughout Europe.

After a long illness, Makhokhian died on 10 February 1937 in Nice, France at the age of 67.

== Exhibitions ==
Vartan Makhokhian held exhibitions in Cairo, Alexandria (1904), Munich, Düsseldorf, Berlin (1907), Berlin (1907), London (1914), Nice (1918, 1932, 1936), Marseilles (1923), Paris (1925), and Monaco (1932).

== Awards ==
He received the Legion of Honour with the degree of Chevalier (Knight) in 1925.

== Legacy ==
French art critic Camille Mauclair published a book in 1918 about Makhokhian entitled Le Peintre de la mer Wartan Makhokhian (French: The Painter of the Sea Vartan Makhokhian). In it, Mauclair describes his work as follows:

His art, inspired, is circumscribed, determined only by Nature and the play of his emotion. He has succeeded in expressing Nature and his emotion with knowledge and power, because he has always been animated with increasing sincerity, worked with methodical perseverance, contemplated with a passionate care. He has produced a series of works which reveal him at once as one of the most true technicists of modern art. And if his works constitute, by their style, their craftsmanship and their power, a silent but strong condemnation of many recent aberrations, vanities and errors, this painter has not intended it, is not even aware of it. He has not theories. He meditates, creates and rises instinctively to the level of the masters, one of whom he will certainly become, as he possesses the necessary quality,-intuition and talent.

Makhokhian's art is displayed in museums throughout the world, including the Musée des Beaux-Arts de Nice, Musée Arménien de France, National Gallery of Armenia, and the Pontifical Residence of the Etchmiadzin Cathedral.

== Gallery ==
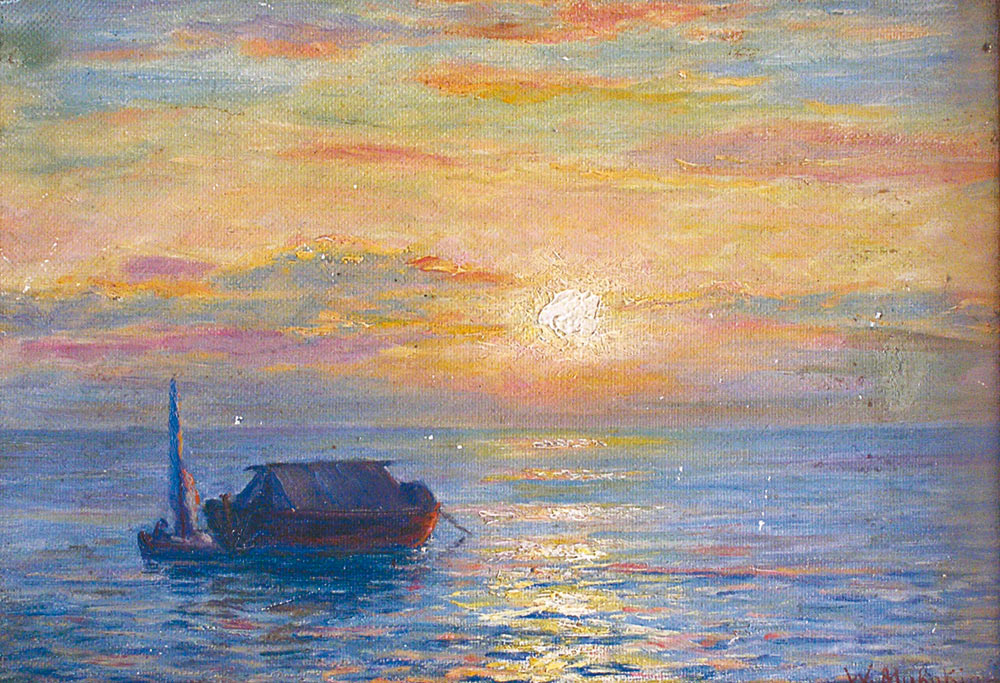
Boat off Trebizond

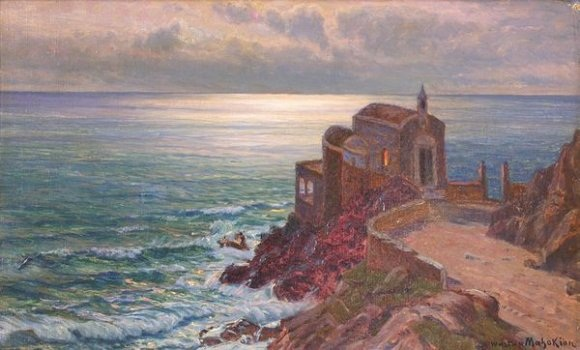
Cliff near Trebizond

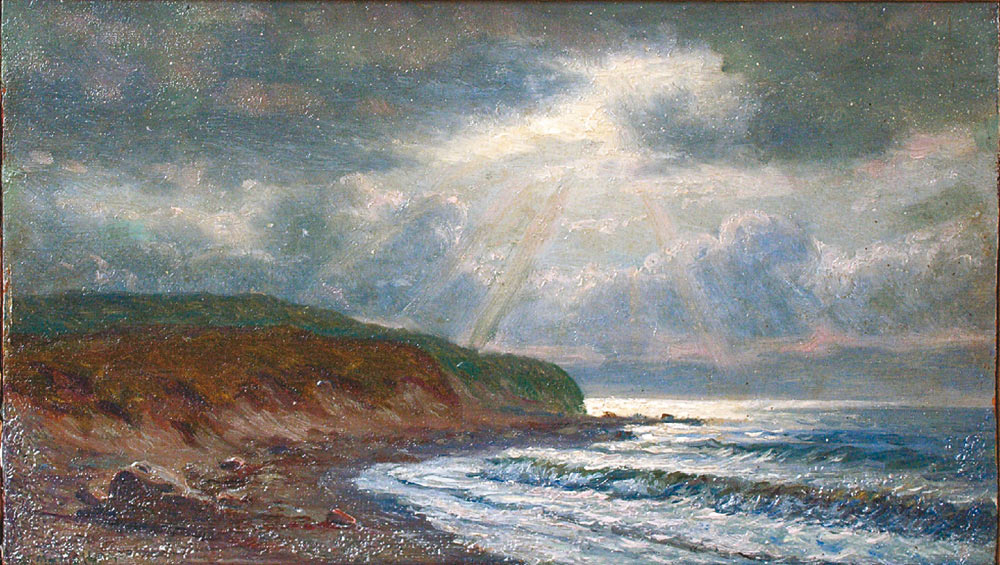
Coast near Trebizond

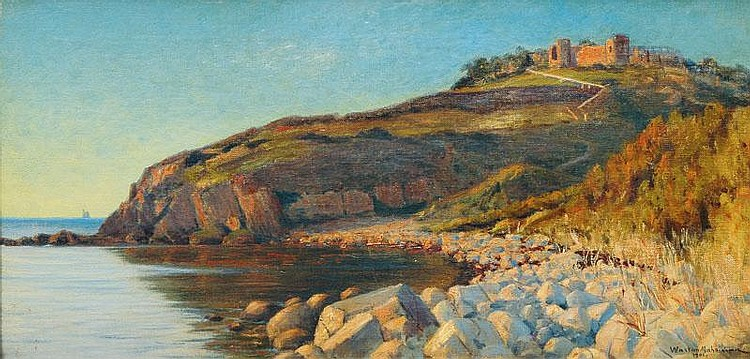
Fortress at the Black Sea Coast

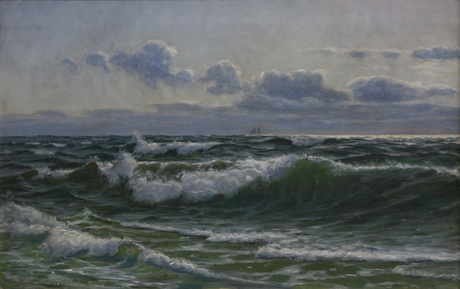
View of the sea (1905)

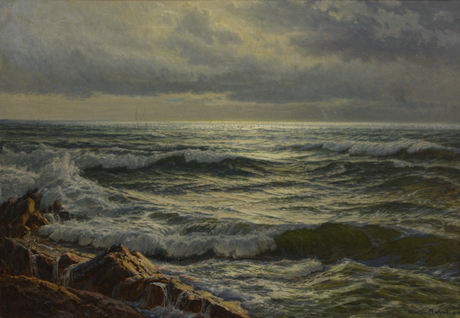
Ocean (1918–1920)

== Monographs ==
- Ara H. Hakobyan, "Vartan Makhokhian Marine painting", Yerevan, 2004, monograph (in Armenian)
- Ara H. Hakobyan, "Vartan Makhokhian", Yerevan, 2006, album (in Armenian)

== See also ==
- Ivan Aivazovsky
