= Bruce Smith (poet) =

American poet (born 1946)

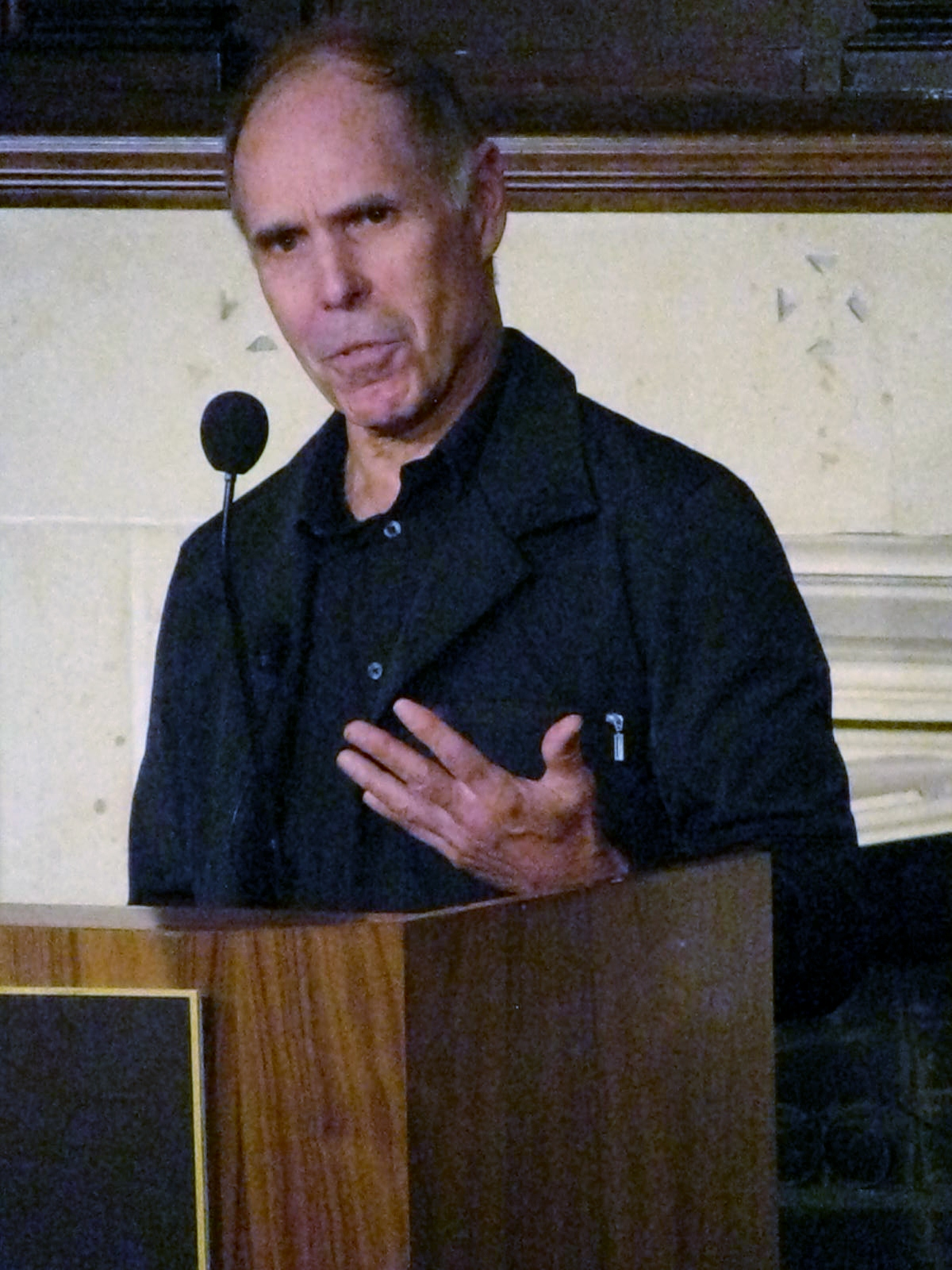
- Smith at the 2012 Lannan Series, Georgetown University
- Born: 1946 (age 79–80); Philadelphia, Pennsylvania, U.S.
- Occupation: Poet

Bruce Smith (born 1946) is an American poet.

== Life ==
Smith was born and raised in Philadelphia. He taught at the University of Alabama, Phillips Academy, Andover and now teaches at Syracuse University. He has been a co-editor of the Graham House Review and a contributing editor of Born Magazine.

== Awards ==
- “Discovery”/The Nation Award winner
- 2000 Guggenheim Fellowship
- National Endowment for the Arts grant
- Massachusetts Foundation for the Arts grant
- 1984 National Poetry Series Selection, for Silver and Information
- National Book Award and the Pulitzer Prize finalist for The Other Lover
- National Book Award finalist for Devotions
- 2012 William Carlos Williams Award presented by the Poetry Society of America
- Finalist, National Book Award and Pulitzer Prize

== Collections ==
- The Common Wages. Sheep Meadow Press. 1983. ISBN 978-0-935296-42-6.
- Silver and Information. University of Georgia Press. December 1985. ISBN 978-0-8203-0762-6.
- Mercy Seat. University of Chicago Press. 1994. p. 11. ISBN 978-0-226-76405-4. "Bruce Smith (poet)."
- The Other Lover. University of Chicago Press. 2000. ISBN 978-0-226-76408-5.
- Songs for Two Voices. University of Chicago Press. April 2005. ISBN 978-0-226-76455-9.
- Devotions. University of Chicago Press. April 15, 2011. ISBN 978-0226764351.
- Spill. University of Chicago Press. 2018. ISBN 978-0-226-57041-9.

== Anthologies ==
- Yusef Komunyakaa; David Lehman, eds. (2003). The Best American Poetry 2003. Simon & Schuster. ISBN 978-0-7432-0388-3.
- Lyn Hejinian; David Lehman, eds. (2004). "Song of the Ransom of the Dark". The best American poetry, 2004. Simon and Schuster. ISBN 978-0-7432-5757-2.
- 2009 Pushcart Prize anthology
