= Nona Balakian =

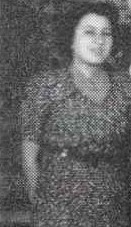
- Balakian in 1937
- Born: September 4, 1918; Constantinople, Ottoman Empire (now Istanbul, Turkey)
- Died: August 12, 1991 (aged 72); New York City, United States
- Occupation: Literary Critic
- Known for: Editor at the New York Times Sunday Book Review, founder of the National Book Critics Circle
- Relatives: Grigoris Balakian (granduncle); Anna Balakian (sister); Peter Balakian (nephew)

Signature
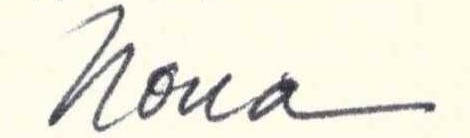

Nona Balakian (Armenian: Նոնա Պալագեան; September 4, 1918, in Constantinople – August 12, 1991, in New York City) was a literary critic and an editor at the New York Times Sunday Book Review. She served on the Pulitzer Prize committee and was a board member of the Authors Guild and the Pen Club as well as a founder of the National Book Critics Circle, whose Nona Balakian Citation for Excellence in Reviewing is named for her.

Balakian immigrated to New York as a child. She graduated from Barnard College and received a master's degree from the Columbia University Graduate School of Journalism, where she studied with the literary critic Lionel Trilling, in 1943. She joined the New York Times Book Review that same year and remained a staff member for 43 years, retiring in 1987.

She and her sister, Anna Balakian, a literary critic and professor at New York University who died in 1997, were members of a literary circle that also included the playwright William Saroyan and the diarist Anaïs Nin. In 1981 Nona Balakian won a Rockefeller grant for her work on William Saroyan. The Balakian sisters were the grandnieces of the archbishop and Armenian genocide survivor Grigoris Balakian and the aunts of the poet and Pulitzer Prize winner Peter Balakian.

== Bibliography ==
- Nona Balakian (1948). Arveste: new writing, New York: Armenian Students' Association
- Nona Balakian (1958). The Armenian-American writer: a new accent in American fiction. New York: Armenian General Benevolent Union. ASIN B002J7S1F8
- Nona Balakian; Charles Simmons (1973). The Creative Present. Notes on contemporary American fiction. New York: Gordian Press. ISBN 8775215810, 978-8775215812
- Nona Balakian (1978). Critical Encounters: Literary views and reviews, 1953-1977, Bobbs-Merrill, ISBN 0672523418, 978-0672523410
- Nona Balakian (1991). Critical Encounters: Literary Views and Reviews. New York: Ashod Press. ISBN 0935102280, 978-0935102284
- Nona Balakian (1998). The World of William Saroyan. Lewisburg, PA: Bucknell University Press. ISBN 083875368X, 9780838753682
