= National Book Critics Circle =

American nonprofit organization

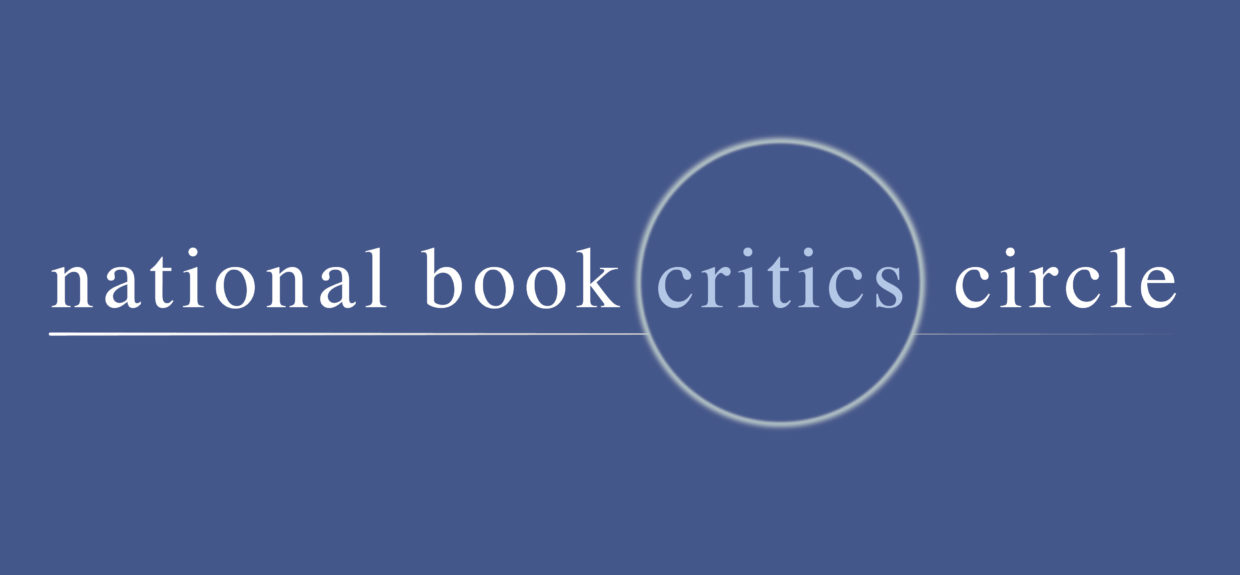
- Abbreviation: NBCC
- Formation: 1974
- Founded at: New York City
- Type: Nonprofit
- Members: 700+
- Key people: Adam Dalva, Heather Scott Partington
- Website: www.bookcritics.org

The National Book Critics Circle (NBCC) is an American nonprofit organization (501(c)(3)) with more than 700 members. It is the professional association of American book review editors and critics, known primarily for the National Book Critics Circle Awards, a set of literary awards presented every March. These are for Criticism, Fiction, Autobiography, Biography, Nonfiction, Poetry and the Gregg Barrios Book in Translation Prize.

The organization was founded in April 1974 in New York City by "John Leonard, Nona Balakian, and Ivan Sandrof intending to extend the Algonquin round table to a national conversation".

It was formally chartered in October 1974 as a New York state non-profit corporation, and the Advisory Board voted in November to establish annual literary awards.

In the first newsletter three months later, President Ivan Sandorf proclaimed the primary purpose "to improve and maintain the standards of literary criticism in an era of diminishing and deteriorating values". At that time there were 140 members, with outreach to freelance critics planned for that year.

NBCC first presented its Awards in January 1976 to books published during 1975 in four categories.

Only active review editors and reviewers may be voting members; they elect the 24 Directors who formally make nominations and alone make final selections each year.

A fifth award category for books (Autobiography/Biography) was added for 1983 and divided in two for 2005. Since 2005, there have been eight awards. Six National Book Critics Circle Awards recognize "best books" published in the United States during the preceding year in six categories: fiction, nonfiction, autobiography, biography, criticism, and poetry. Annually "the most accomplished reviewer" among its members is recognized by the Nona Balakian Citation for Excellence in Reviewing (from 1991).

The NBCC also recognizes no more than one person or organization for "exceptional contributions to books" with the Ivan Sandrof Lifetime Achievement Award (from 1981 under more than one name).All eight awards are officially dated in the preceding year.

In 2017, the NBCC established the Emerging Critics Fellowship which provides early career literary critics with mentorships and professional development opportunities. In 2021, NBCC established the Toni Morrison Achievement Award, which honors institutions.

As a professional association, NBCC also works to improve the quality of reviews and provides services to its members.

== Controversies ==
In 2020, more than half of the 24 board members resigned over conflicting views on how to address perceived racial disparities both on the board, and within the industry they represent. This demonstrative revolt has also been attributed to breaches in confidentiality stemming from leaked emails, and the dismissive, antagonistic communication style of a long-standing board member, Carlin Romano, whom half the board members describe as a bully. Overall, the mass resignations amount to a controversy seen as part of an industry-wide reckoning concerning the lack of diversity in publishing and literary awards.

== First Board of Directors (1975) ==
- President: Ivan Sandrof, The Worcester Telegram-Gazette
- Vice President: Digby Diehl, Los Angeles Times
- Secretary: Nona Balakian, The New York Times Book Review
- Treasurer: Susan Heath, The Saturday Review
- Barbara A. Bannon, Publishers Weekly
- John Barkham, John Barkham Reviews
- Alvin Beam, Cleveland Plain Dealer
- Alice Cromie, Freelance Critic
- Martha Duffy, Time
- Eliot Fremont-Smith, The Village Voice
- Elizabeth Hardwick, New York Review of Books
- Herbert A. Kenny, Freelance Critic
- John Leonard, The New York Times Book Review
- Thorpe Menn, The Kansas City Star
- Stanton Peckham, Denver Post
- Peter S. Prescott, Newsweek
- Larry Swindell, Philadelphia Inquirer
- Jonathan Yardley, Miami Herald

== Presidents ==
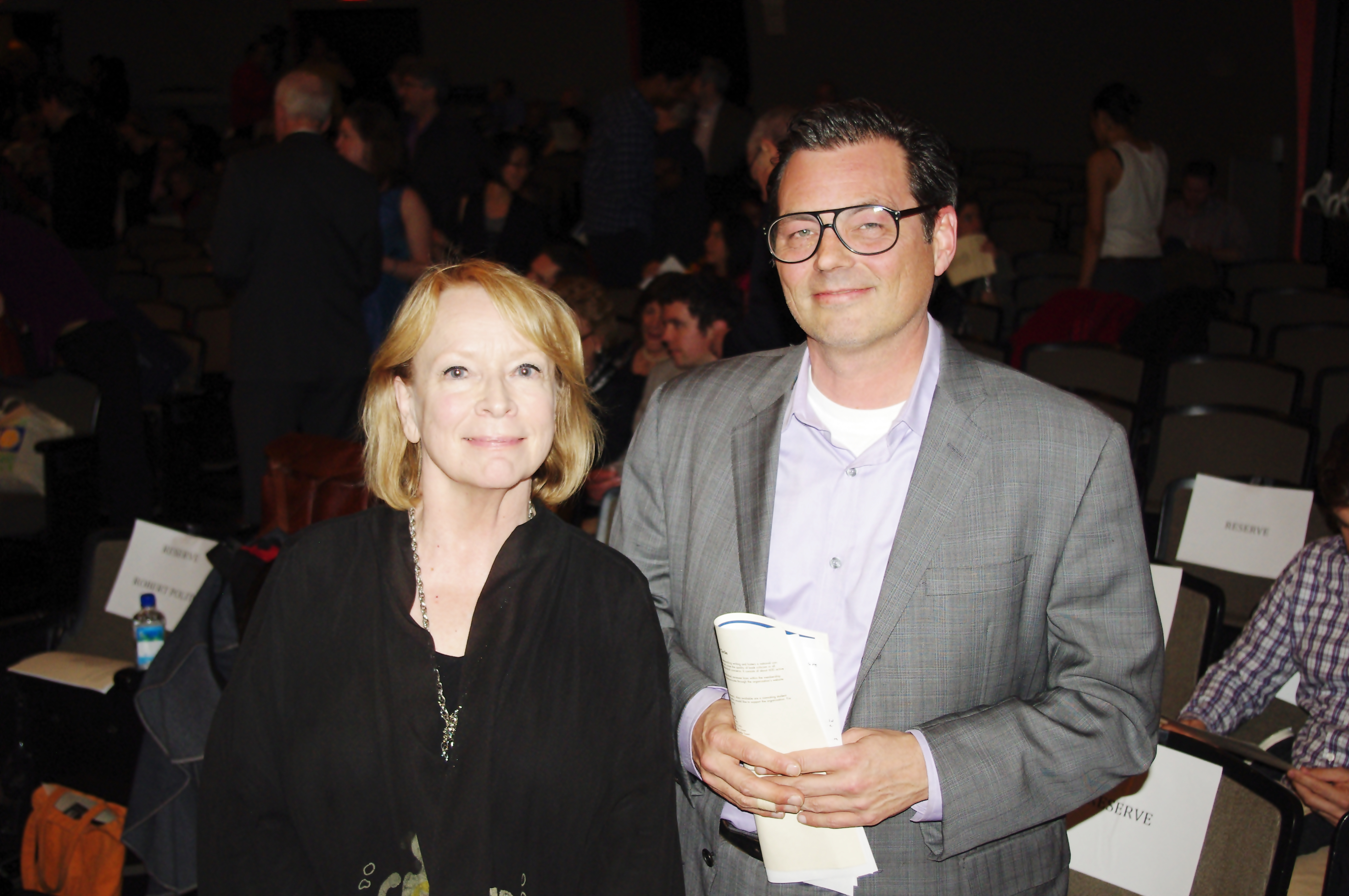
NBCC past president Jane Ciabattari and then-current president Eric Banks at the 2011 Awards, March 2012

- 1974–1976: Ivan Sandrof, Worcester Telegram-Gazette
- 1976–1982: Eliot Fremont-Smith, Village Voice
- 1982–1984: Richard Locke, Vanity Fair
- 1984–1986: Brigitte Weeks, The Washington Post Book World
- 1986–1990: Nina King, Newsday
- 1990–1992: Jack Miles, Los Angeles Times
- 1992–1994: Herbert Liebowitz, Parnassus
- 1994–1996: Carlin Romano, Philadelphia Inquirer
- 1996–1998: Art Winslow, The Nation
- 1998–2000: Barbara Hoffert, Library Journal
- 2001–2004: Elizabeth Taylor, Chicago Tribune
- 2004–2006: Rebecca T. Miller, Library Journal
- 2006–2008: John Freeman, Freelance Critic
- 2008–2011: Jane Ciabattari, Freelance Critic
- 2011–2013: Eric Banks, Bookforum
- 2013–2015: Laurie Muchnick, Bloomberg News
- 2015–2017: Tom Beer, Newsday
- 2017–2019: Kate Tuttle, Boston Globe
- 2019–2020: Laurie Hertzel, Minneapolis Star Tribune
- 2020-2020: Jane Ciabattari, Freelance Critic (acting)
- 2020–2022: David Varno, Publishers Weekly
- 2022–2023: Megan Labrise, Kirkus
- 2023–2025: Heather Scott Partington, Freelance Critic
- 2025–present: Adam Dalva, Freelance Critic

== Service Award Winners ==
- 2022: Barbara Hoffert, former NBCC President
- 2023: Marion Winik, former NBCC Treasurer
- 2024: Lori Lynn Turner, Associate Director of The New School Creative Writing Program
- 2025, Elizabeth Taylor, former NBCC President
