= Anna Balakian =

- Born: July 14, 1915; Constantinople, Ottoman Empire (now Istanbul, Turkey)
- Died: August 12, 1997 (aged 82); New York City, United States
- Occupation: Literary Critic
- Known for: Chair of the Department of Comparative Literature at New York University

Anna Balakian (14 July 1915 – 12 August 1997) was the former chair of the Department of Comparative Literature at New York University. She served as president of the American Comparative Literature Association from 1977 to 1980 and was a longtime leader in the International Comparative Literature Association. The author of numerous acclaimed books and articles, she was the recipient of many awards and was internationally recognized as an authority on symbolism and surrealism.

== Life ==
Anna Balakian was born in Constantinople to Armenian parents. At the age of 11, she moved with her family to New Britain, Connecticut. She earned her bachelor's degree at Hunter College and her master's and doctorate degree at Columbia University. While in graduate school, she taught French literature and language full-time at the Hunter College High School.

Balakian's experience of displacement, following her family's emigration from Constantinople through Western Europe and eventually to the United States, shaped her interest in comparative literature.

She published her first book, The Literary Origins of Surrealism in 1947. In this study about the founders of modern French poetry, Anna Balakian placed avant-garde writers and artists against the background of French and German romanticism. In 1953, she began her long career at New York University culminating in her eight-year chairmanship of the Department of Comparative Literature. Balakian's next book, Surrealism: The Road to the Absolute (1959), is an exposition of, and apologia for, surrealist literature and art. In The Symbolist Movement: A Critical Appraisal (1969), she gives a concise yet detailed account of symbolist poetry. Her André Breton: Magus of Surrealism (1971) was the first full-scale biography of the founder of the surrealist movement.

She and her sister, Nona Balakian, a literary critic and an editor at The New York Times Book Review, were members of a literary circle that also included the playwright William Saroyan and the diarist Anaïs Nin.

In 2004, the International Comparative Literature Association established the Anna Balakian Prize in honor of her and to promote scholarly research by younger comparatists.
