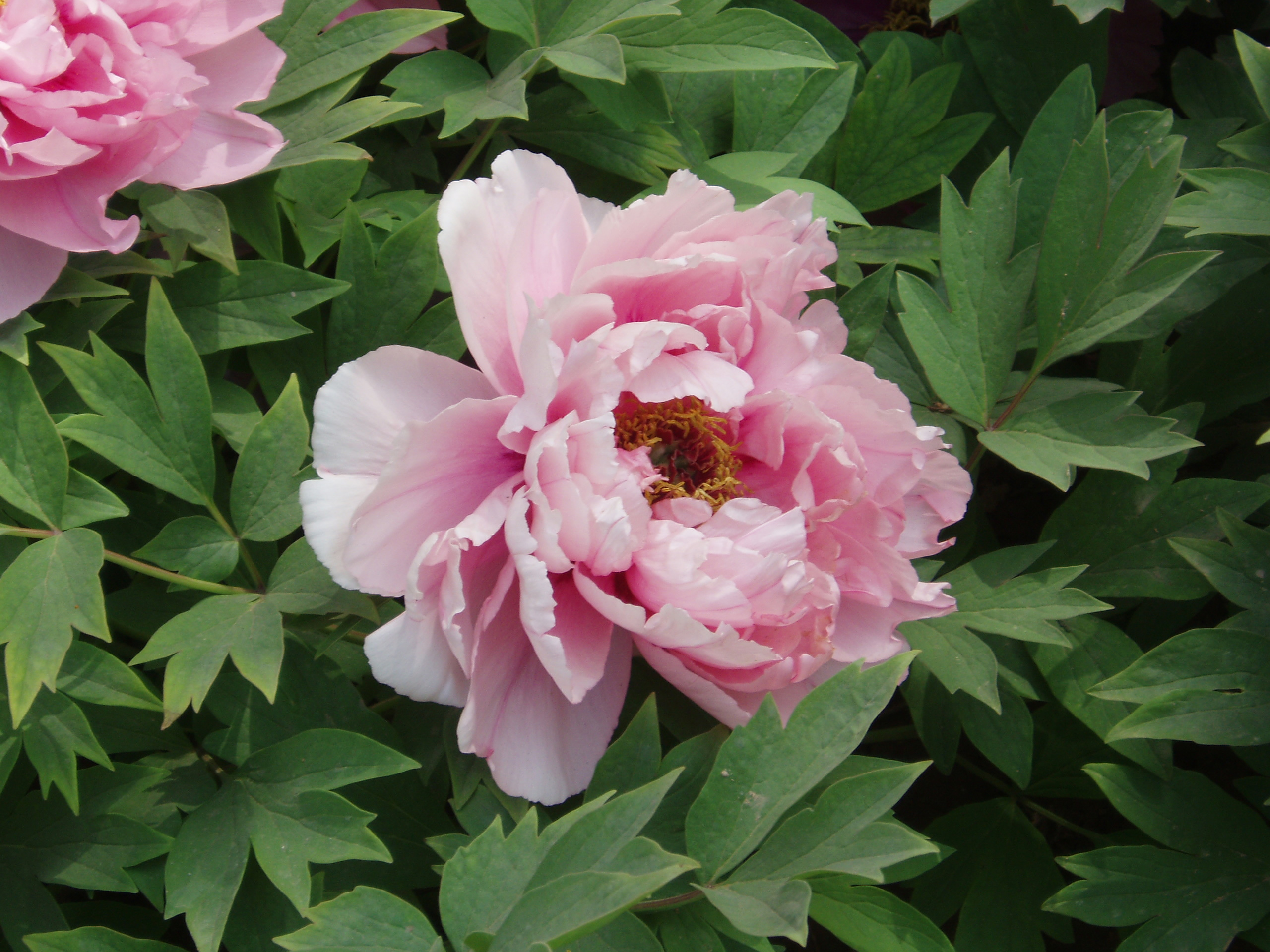
- Paeonia suffruticosa

Scientific classification
- Kingdom: Plantae
- Clade: Tracheophytes
- Clade: Angiosperms
- Clade: Eudicots
- Order: Saxifragales
- Family: Paeoniaceae; Raf.
- Genus: Paeonia; L.

Type species
- Paeonia officinalis L.

Sections
- Moutan; Onaepia; Paeoniae; For lower taxa, see text.
- The range of Paeonia

= Peony =

Genus of flowering plants

The peony or paeony (/ˈpiːəni/) is any flowering plant in the genus Paeonia, the only genus in the family Paeoniaceae. Peonies are native to Asia, Europe, and Western North America. Scientists differ on the number of species that can be distinguished, ranging from 25 to 40, although the current consensus describes 33 known species. The relationships between the species need to be further clarified.

Most are herbaceous perennial plants 0.25–1 metre (1–3 ft) tall, but some are woody shrubs 0.25–3.5 metres (1–11 ft) tall. They have compound, deeply lobed leaves and large, often fragrant flowers, in colors ranging from purple and pink to red, white or yellow, in late spring and early summer. The flowers have a short blooming season, usually lasting for only 7–10 days.

Peonies are popular garden plants in temperate regions. Herbaceous peonies are also sold as cut flowers on a large scale, although they generally are only available in late spring and early summer.

== Description ==
=== Morphology ===
All Paeoniaceae are herbaceous perennials or deciduous shrubs, with thick storage roots and thin roots for gathering water and minerals. Some species are caespitose (tufted), because the crown produces adventitious buds, while others have stolons. They have rather large compound leaves without glands and stipules, and with anomocytic stomata (i.e. surrounded by irregularly shaped cells). In the woody species the new growth emerges from scaly buds on the previous flush or from the crown of the rootstock. The annual growth is predetermined: if the growing tip of a shoot is removed, no new buds will develop that season.

The large bisexual flowers are mostly single at the end of the stem. In P. emodi, P. lactiflora, P. veitchii and many of the cultivars these contributed to, few additional flowers develop in the axils of the leaves. Flowers close at night or when the sky is overcast. Each flower is subtended by a number of bracts, that may form a sort of involucre, has 3–7 tough free sepals and mostly 5–8, but occasionally up to 13 free petals. These categories however are intergrading, making it difficult to assign some of them, and the number of these parts may vary. Within are numerous (50–160) free stamens, with anthers fixed at their base to the filaments, and are sagittate in shape, open with longitudinal slits at the outer side and free pollen grains which have three slits or pores and consist of two cells. Within the circle of stamens is a more or less prominent, lobed disc, which is presumed not to excrete nectar. Within the disk is a varying number (1–15) of separate carpels, which have a very short style and a decurrent stigma. Each of these develops into a dry fruit (which is called a follicle), which opens with a lengthwise suture and each of which contains one or a few large fleshy seeds.

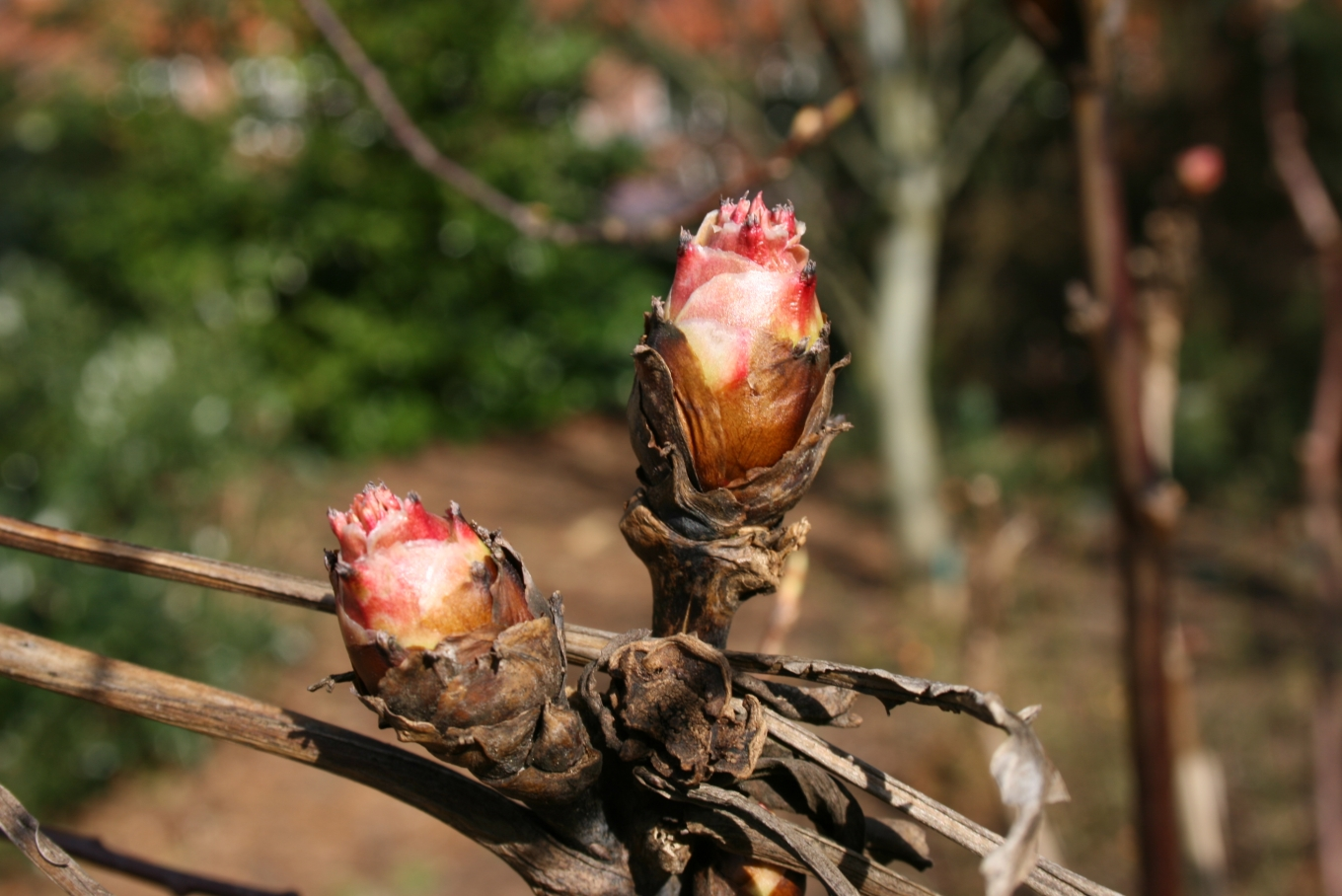
Paeonia suffruticosa,
spring buds

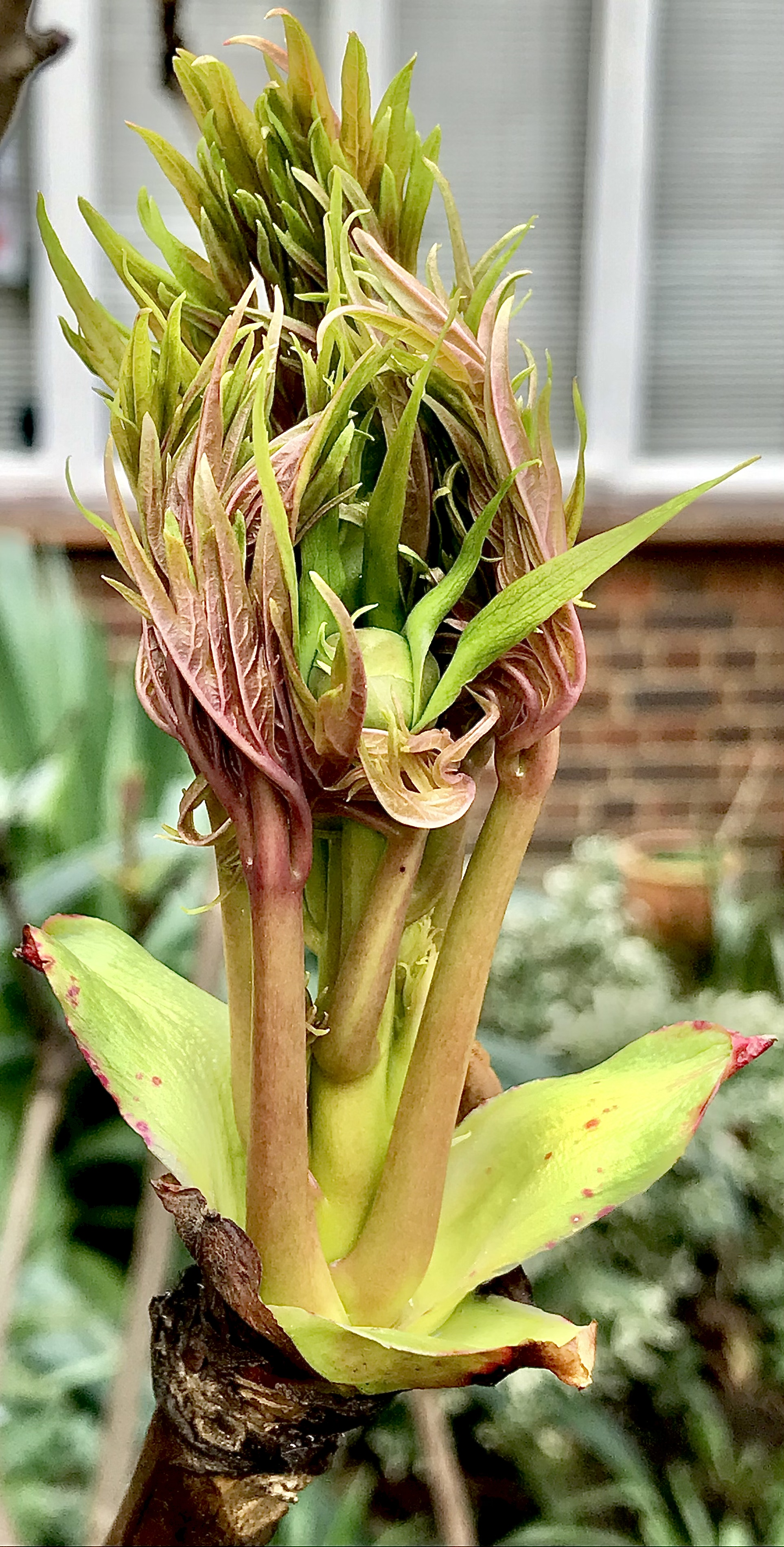
P. ludlowii,
spring shoot

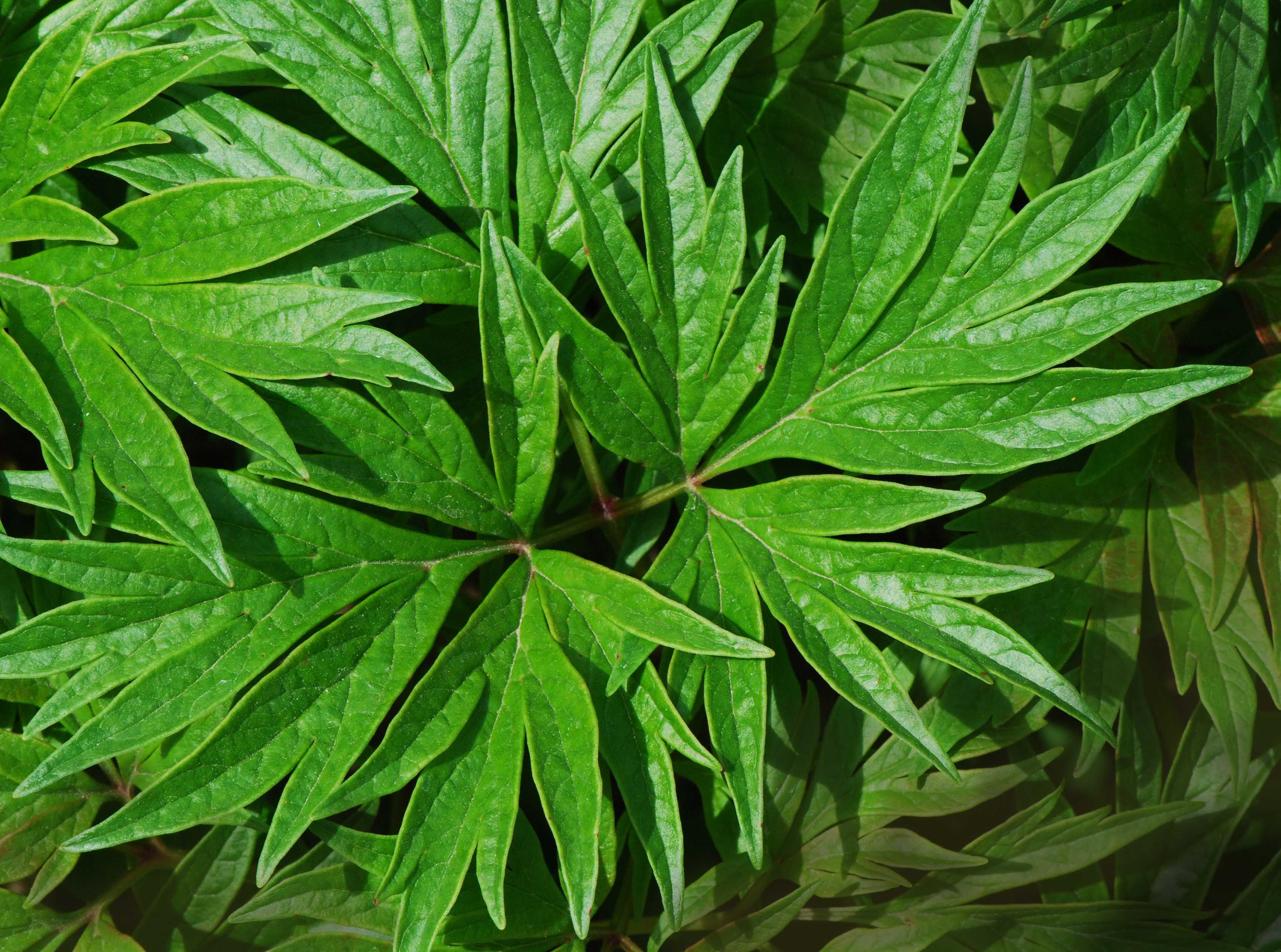
Paeonia veitchii,
leaf

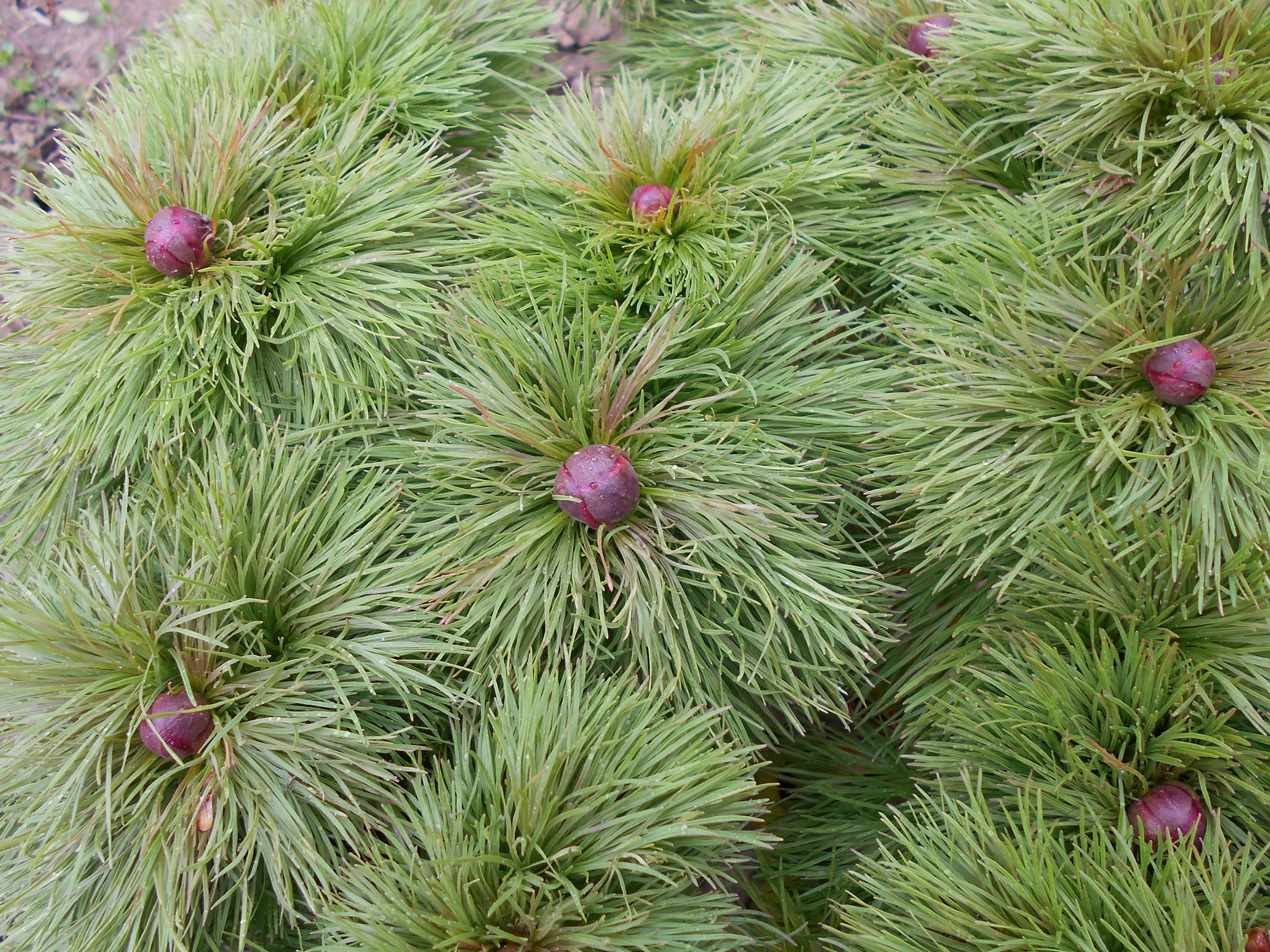
Paeonia tenuifolia,
leaves and flower buds

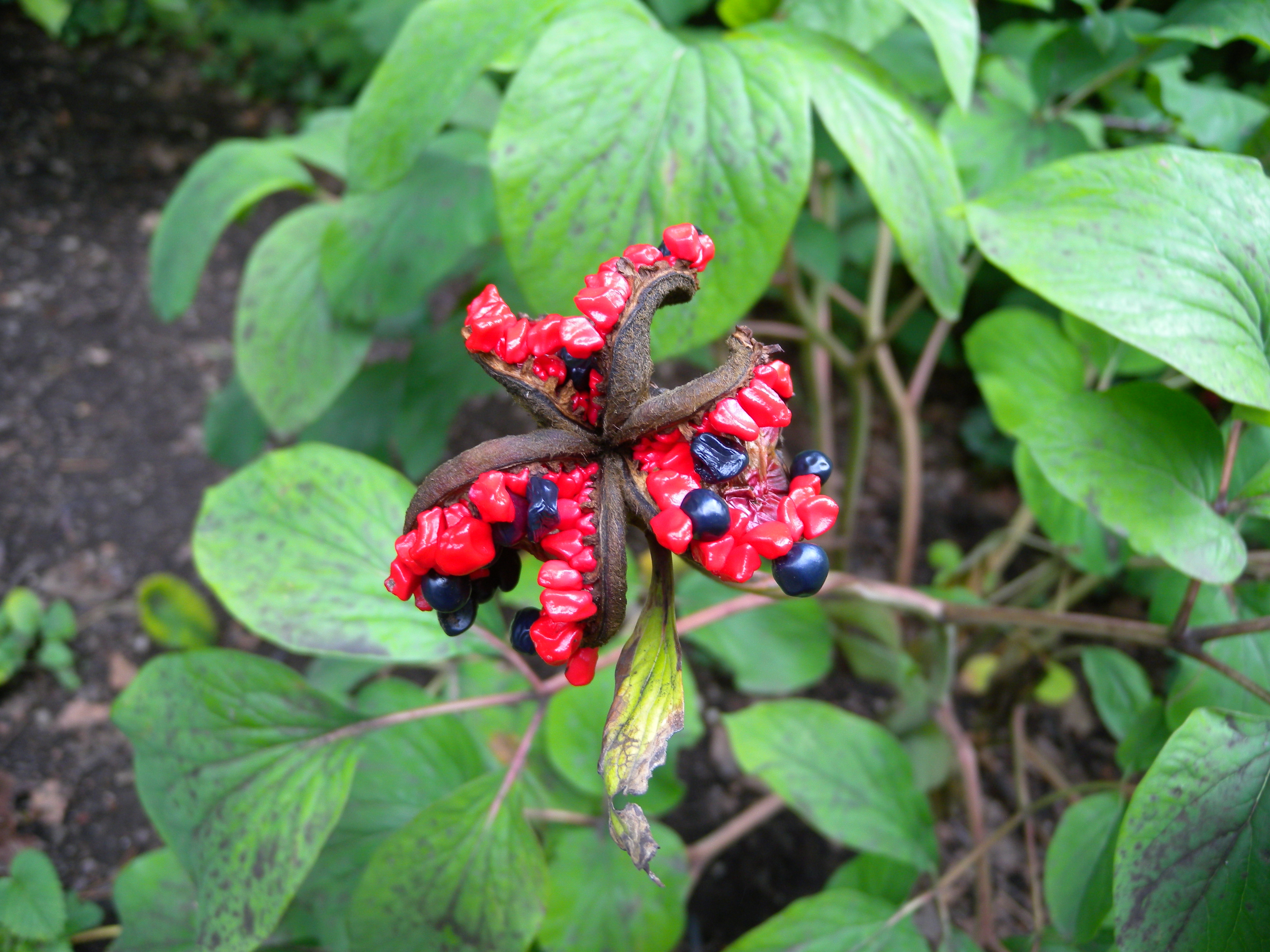
Paeonia wittmanniana,
ripe follicles with seeds

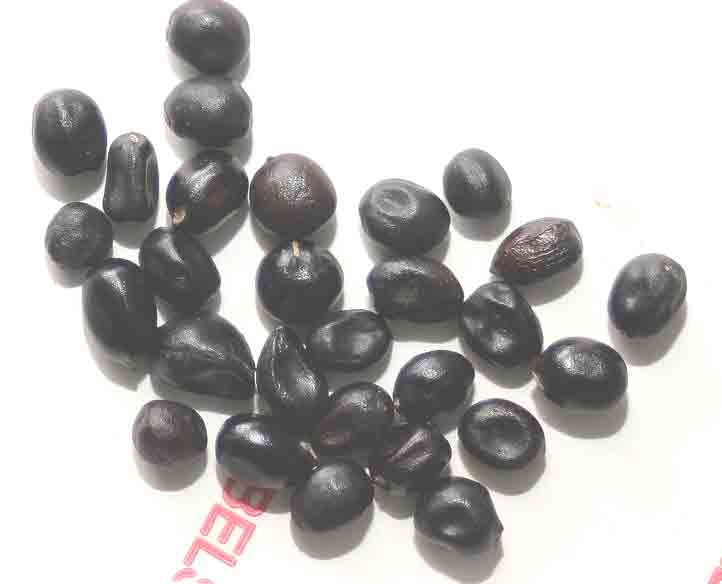
Paeonia anomala,
seeds

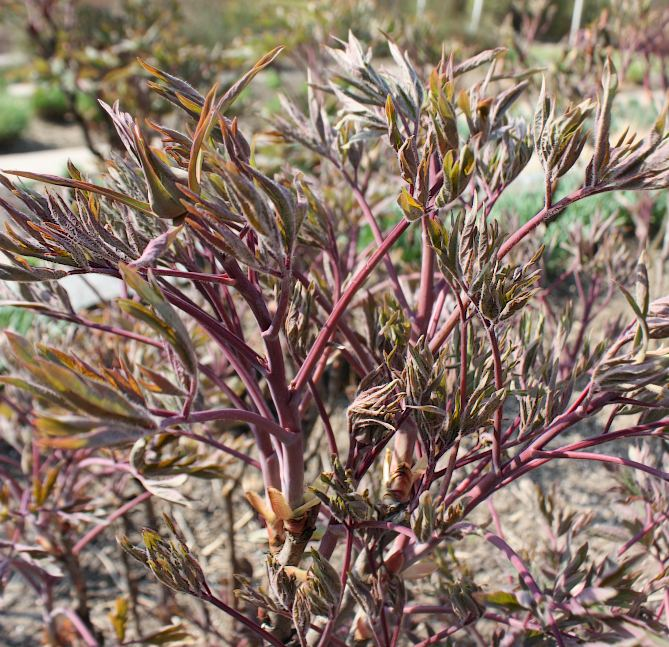
Young growth of a tree peony

=== Phytochemistry ===
Over 262 compounds have been obtained so far from the plants of Paeoniaceae. These include monoterpenoid glucosides, flavonoids, tannins, stilbenoids, triterpenoids, steroids, paeonols, and phenols. In vitro biological activities include antioxidant, antitumor, antipathogenic, immunomodulative, cardiovascular-system-protective activities and central-nervous-system activities.

Paeoniaceae are dependent on C3 carbon fixation. They contain ellagic acid, myricetin, ethereal oils and flavones, as well as crystals of calcium oxalate. The wax tubules that are formed primarily consist of palmitone (the ketone of palmitic acid).

=== Genome ===
The basic chromosome number is five. About half of the species of the section Paeonia however is tetraploid (4n=20), particularly many of those in the Mediterranean region. Both allotetraploids and autotetraploids are known, and some diploid species are also of hybrid origin.

== Taxonomy ==
The family name Paeoniaceae was first used by Friedrich K.L. Rudolphi in 1830, following a suggestion by Friedrich Gottlieb Bartling that same year. The family had been given other names a few years earlier. The composition of the family has varied, but it has always consisted of Paeonia and one or more genera that are now placed in Ranunculales. It has been widely believed that Paeonia is closest to Glaucidium, and this idea has been followed in some recent works. Molecular phylogenetic studies, however, have demonstrated conclusively that Glaucidium belongs in the family Ranunculaceae, order Ranunculales, but that Paeonia belongs in the unrelated order Saxifragales. The genus Paeonia consists of about 35 species, assigned to three sections: Moutan, Onaepia and Paeoniae. The section Onaepia only includes P. brownii and P. californica. The section Moutan is divided into P. delavayi and P. ludlowii, together making up the subsection Delavayanae, and P. cathayana, P. decomposita, P. jishanensis, P. osti, P. qiui and P. rockii which constitute the subsection Vaginatae. P. suffruticosa is a cultivated hybrid swarm, not a naturally occurring species.

The remainder of the species belongs to the section Paeonia, which is characterised by a complicated reticulate evolution. Only about half of the (sub)species is diploid, the other half tetraploid, while some species both have diploid and tetraploid populations. In addition to the tetraploids, are some diploid species also likely the result of hybridisation, or nothospecies. Known diploid taxa in the Paeonia-section are P. anomala, P. lactiflora, P. veitchii, P. tenuifolia, P. emodi, P. broteri, P. cambedessedesii, P. clusii, P. rhodia, P. daurica subsps. coriifolia, daurica, macrophylla and mlokosewitschii. Tetraploid taxa are P. arietina, P. officinalis, P. parnassica, P. banatica, P. russi, P. peregrina, P. coriacea, P. mascula subsps. hellenica and mascula, and P. daurica subsps. tomentosa and wittmanniana. Species that have both diploid and tetraploid populations include P. clusii, P. mairei and P. obovata. P. anomala was proven to be a hybrid of P. lactiflora and P. veitchii, although being a diploid with 10 chromosomes. P. emodi and P. sterniana are diploid hybrids of P. lactiflora and P. veitchii too, and radically different in appearance. P. russi is the tetraploid hybrid of diploid P. lactiflora and P. mairei, while P. cambedessedesii is the diploid hybrid of P. lactiflora, likely P. mairei, but possibly also P. obovata. P. peregrina is the tetraploid hybrid of P. anomala and either P. arietina, P. humilis, P. officinalis, P. parnassica or less likely P. tenuifolia, or one of their (now extinct) common ancestors. P. banatica is the tetraploid hybrid of P. mairei and one of this same group. P. broteri, P. coriacea, P. clusii, P. rhodia, P. daurica subsp. mlokosewitschi, P. mascula subsp. hellenica and ssp. mascula, and P. daurica subsp. wittmanniana are all descendants of hybrids of P. lactiflora and P. obovata.

=== Phylogeny ===
Recent genetic analyses relate the monogeneric family Paeoniaceae to a group of families with woody species in the order Saxifragales. This results in the following relationship tree. One dissertation suggests the section Onaepia branches off earliest, but a later publication of the same author and others suggests the Moutan-section splits off first. Within that section P. ludlowii and P. delavayi are more related to each other than to any other species.

- Saxifragales
  - Peridiscaceae
  - - woody clade
      - Paeonia
      - - Altingiaceae
        - - Hamamelidaceae
          - - Cercidiphyllum
            - Daphniphyllum
    - core Saxifragales

- genus Paeonia
  - section Paeoniae
    all Eurasian herbaceous peonies
  - section Moutan
    - - subsection Vaginatae
        all other tree peonies
      - subsection Delavayanae
        - P. ludlowii
        - P. delavayi
  - - section Onaepia
      - P. brownii
      - P. californica

=== Species ===
- Herbaceous species (about 30 species)
  - Paeonia algeriensis (Algerian peony)
  - Paeonia anomala
  - Paeonia turcica (Turkish peony)
  - Paeonia arietina (ram's horn peony)
  - Paeonia broteri (Brotero's peony)
  - Paeonia brownii (Brown's peony, native peony, or western peony)
  - Paeonia californica (California peony or wild peony)
  - Paeonia cambessedesii (Majorcan peony or Balearic peony)
  - Paeonia clusii
    - subsp. clusii
    - subsp. rhodia
  - Paeonia coriacea (Andalusian peony)
  - Paeonia corsica (Corsican peony)
  - Paeonia daurica (Crimean peony)
    - subsp. coriifolia
    - subsp. daurica
    - subsp. macrophylla
    - subsp. mlokosewitschii (Caucasian peony or golden peony)
    - subsp. tomentosa
    - subsp. velebitensis
    - subsp. wittmanniana (Wittmann's peony)
  - Paeonia emodi (Himalayan peony)
  - Paeonia intermedia (Intermediate peony or Altay peony)
  - Paeonia kesrouanensis (Keserwan peony)
  - Paeonia lactiflora (Chinese peony, Chinese herbaceous peony, or common garden peony)
  - Paeonia mairei
  - Paeonia mascula (Balkan peony, wild peony, or male peony)
    - subsp. mascula
    - subsp. bodurii
    - subsp. hellenica
    - subsp. russoi
  - Paeonia obovata (woodland peony)
    - subsp. willmottiae
  - Paeonia officinalis (European peony, common peony, or garden peony; type species)
  - Paeonia parnassica (Greek peony)
  - Paeonia peregrina (Kosovar peony or Romanian peony)
  - Paeonia sterniana
  - Paeonia tenuifolia (steppe peony or fern leaf peony)
  - Paeonia veitchii (Veitch's peony)
- Woody species, tree peonies (about 8 species)
  - Paeonia decomposita
  - Paeonia delavayi (Delavay's tree peony or Dian peony)
  - Paeonia jishanensis (Jishan peony)
  - Paeonia ludlowii (Tibetan tree peony or Ludlow's tree peony)
  - Paeonia ostii (Osti's peony)
  - Paeonia qiui (Qiu's peony)
  - Paeonia rockii (Rock's peony; synonym Paeonia suffruticosa subsp. rockii (Chinese tree peony, known as "moutan (moutan peony)" in China))
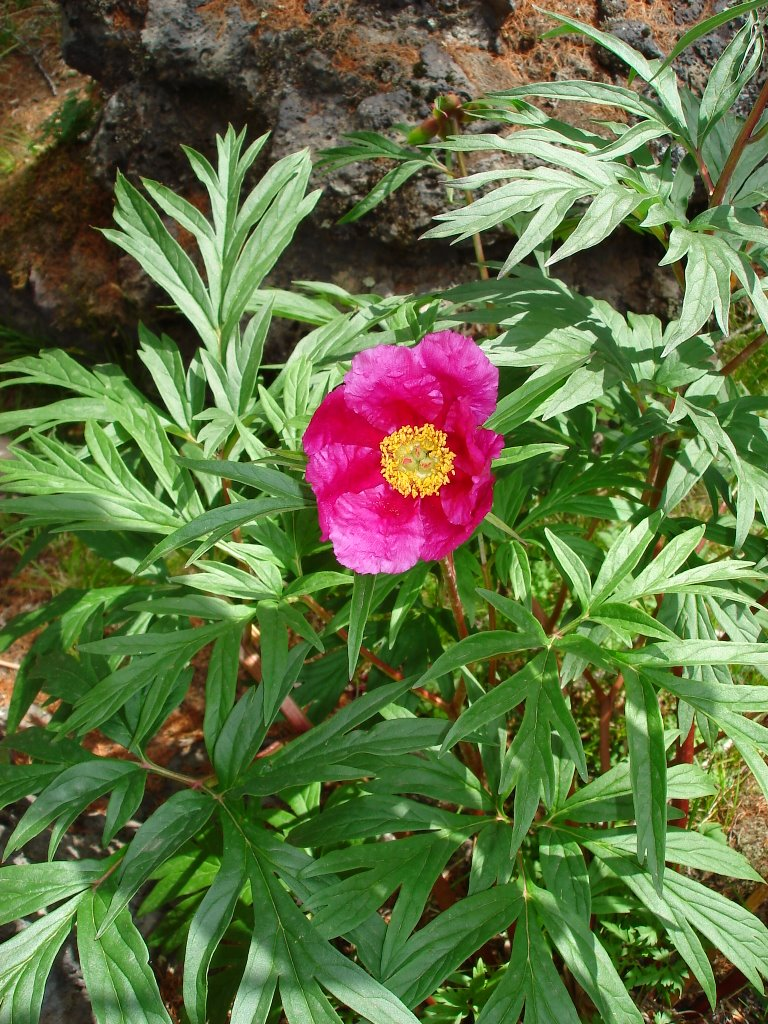
Paeonia anomala

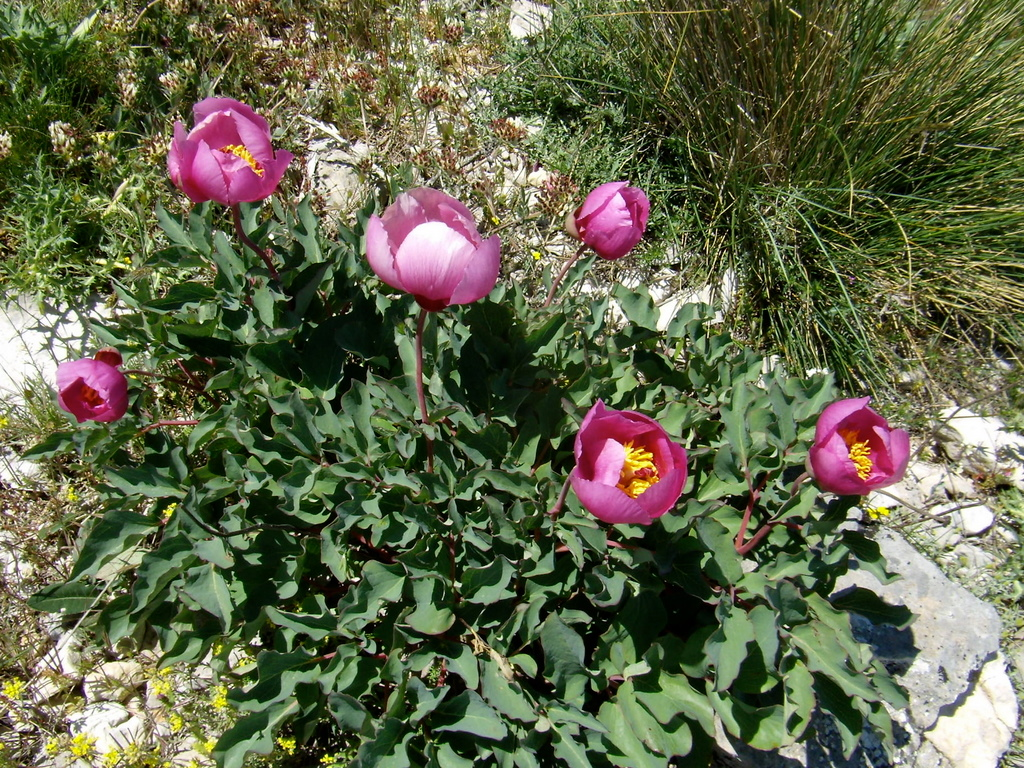
Paeonia broteri

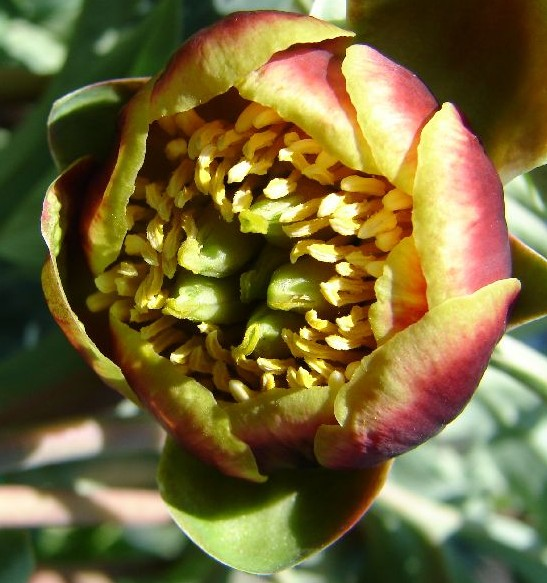
Paeonia brownii

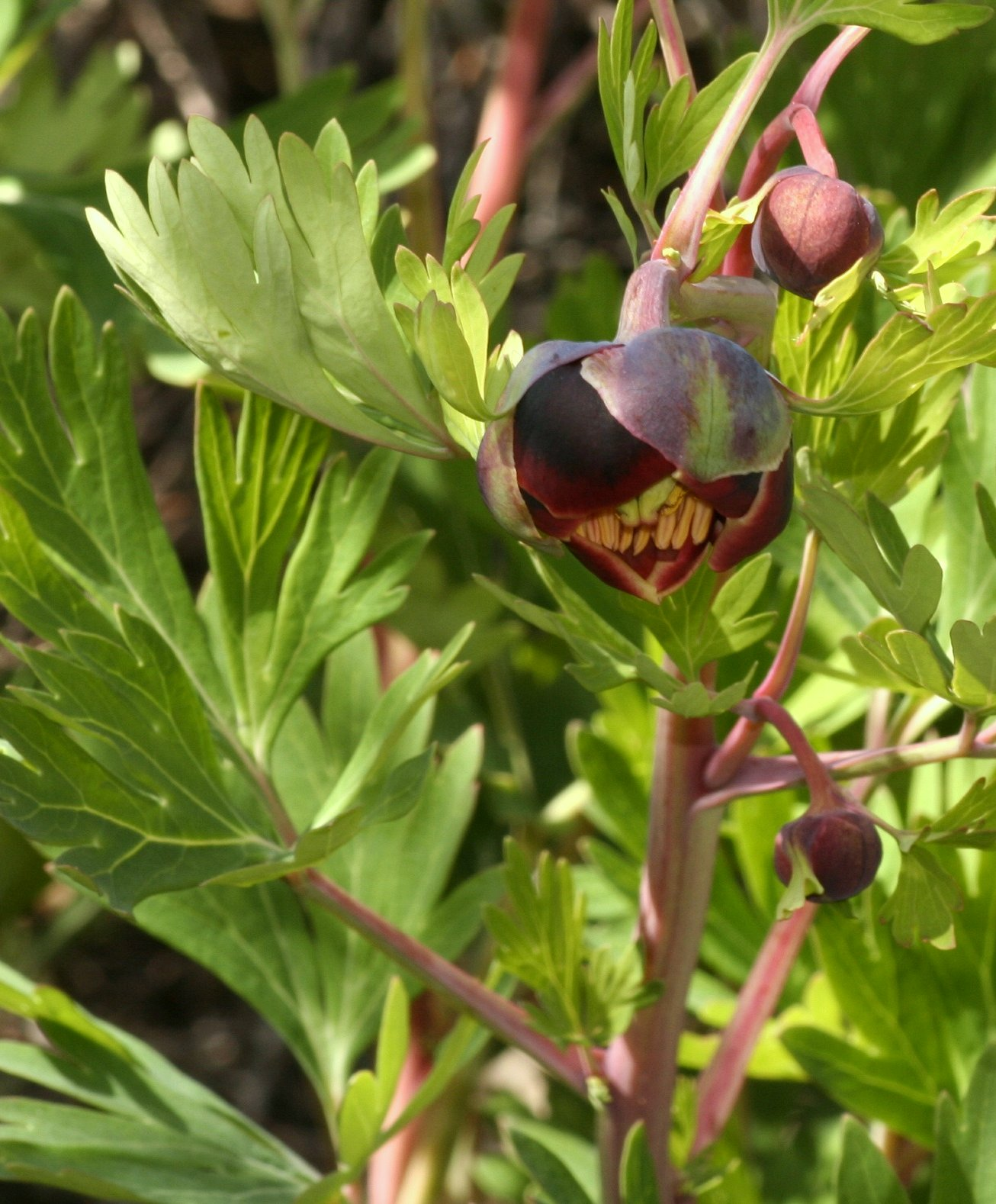
Paeonia californica

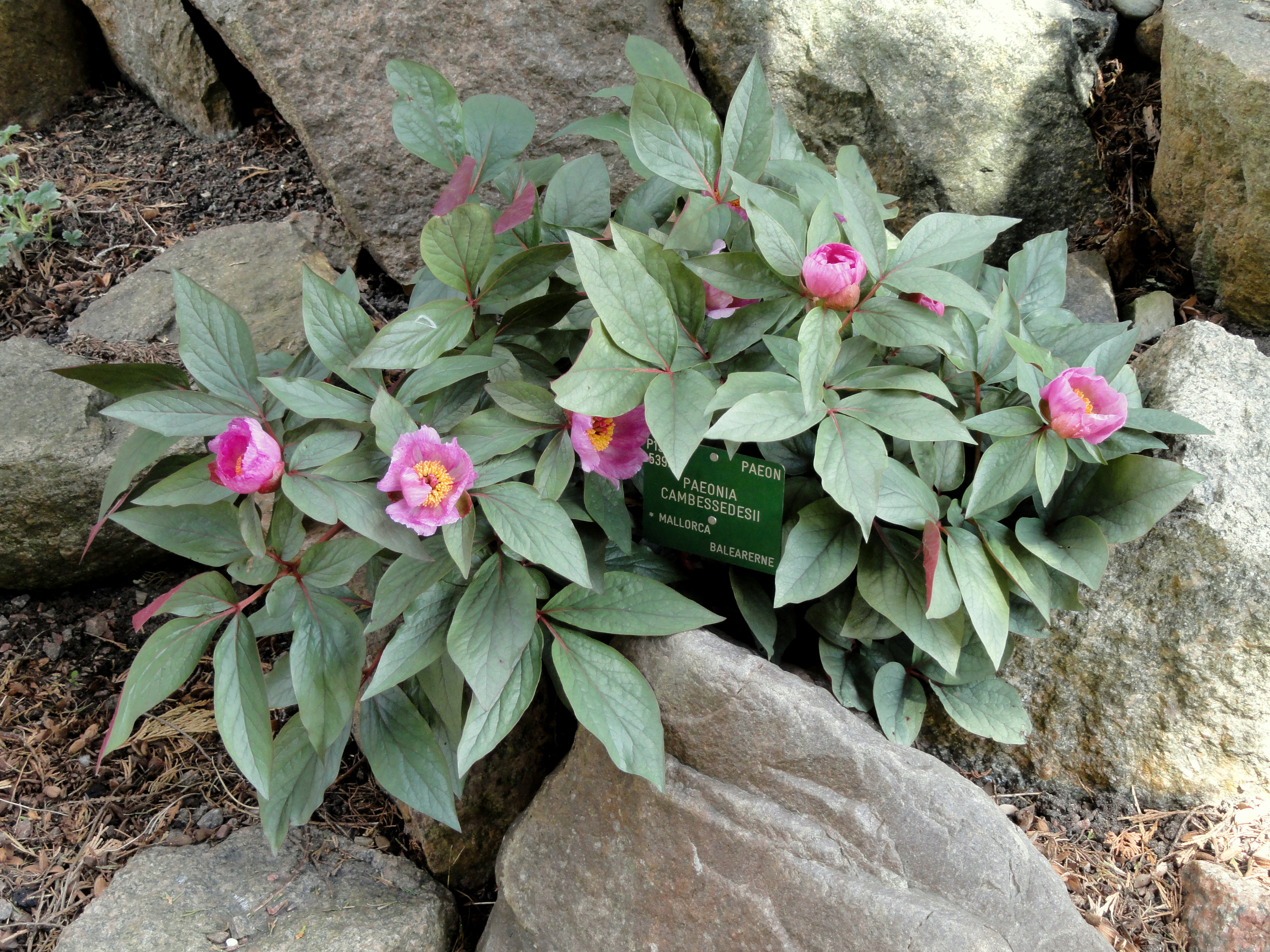
Paeonia cambessedesii

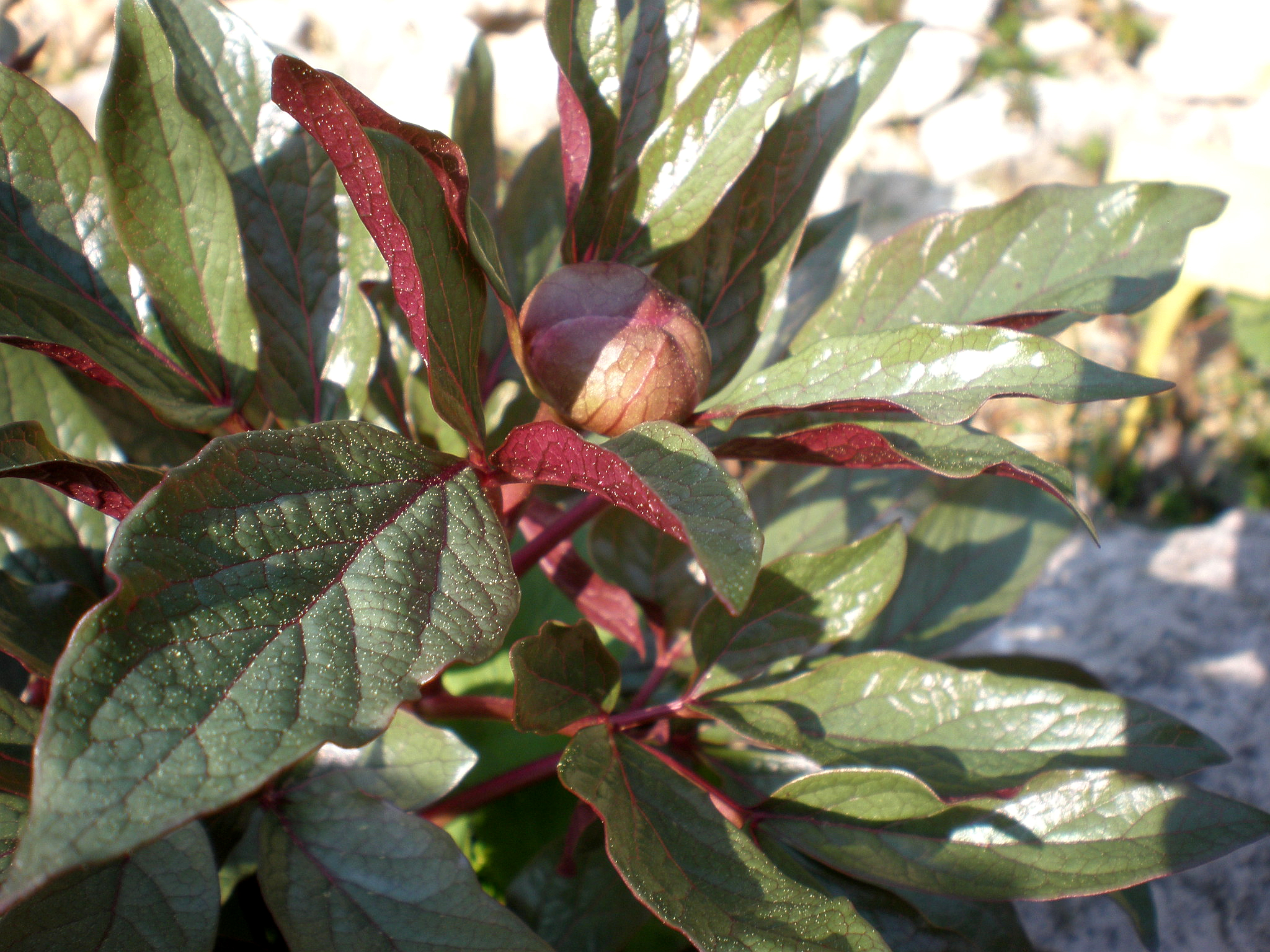
Paeonia cambessedesii

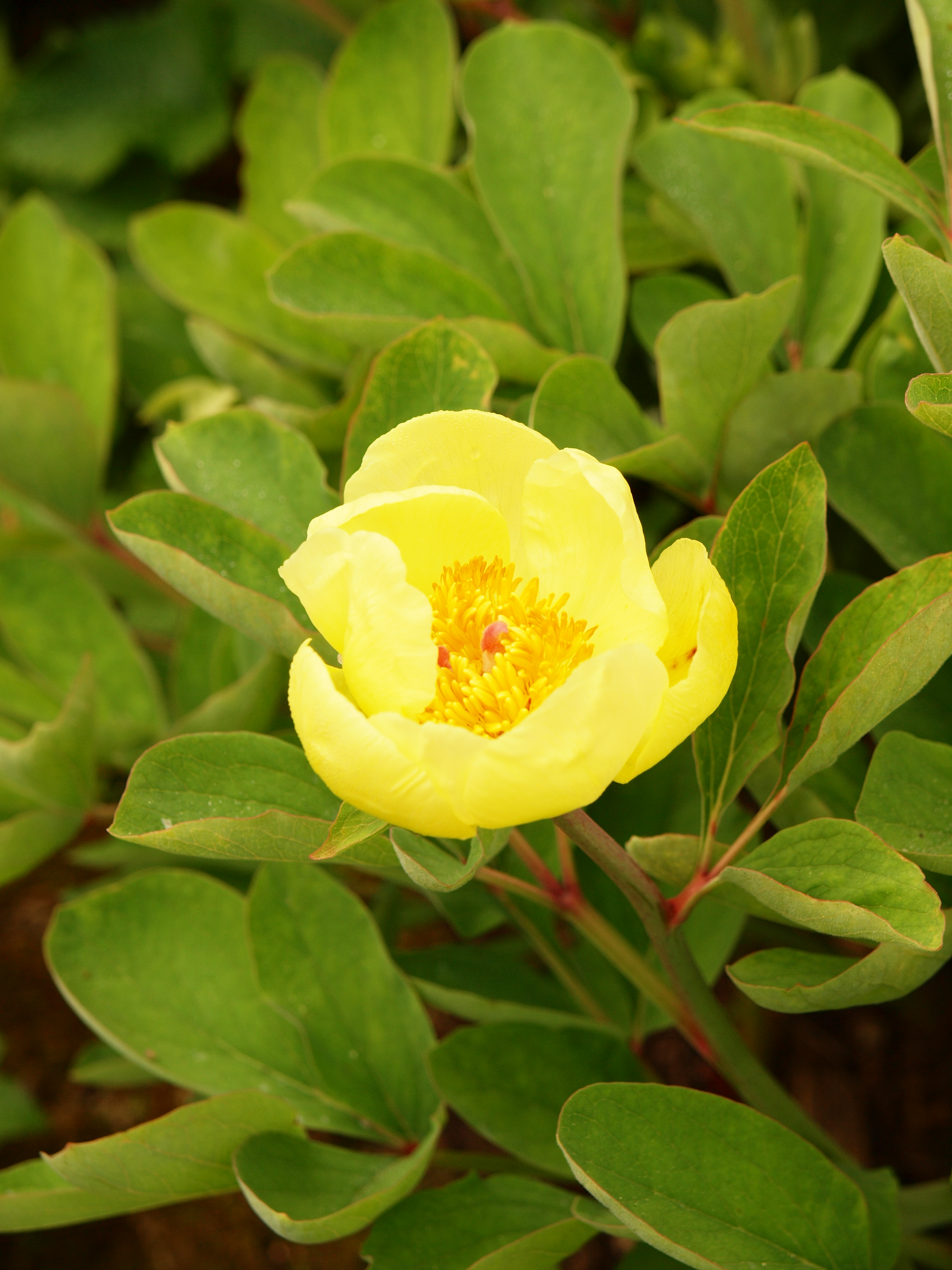
Paeonia daurica subsp. mlokosewitschii

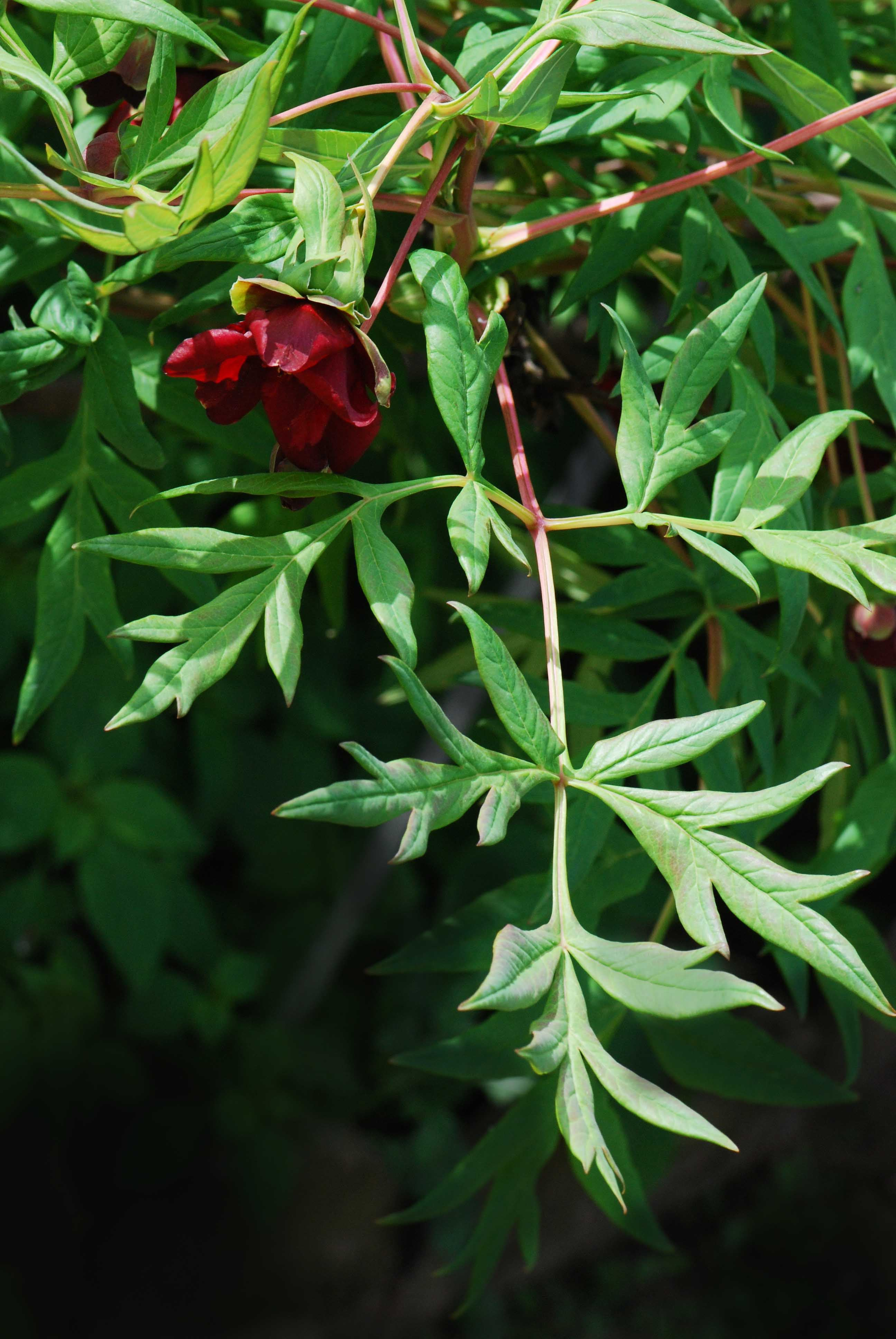
Paeonia delavayi

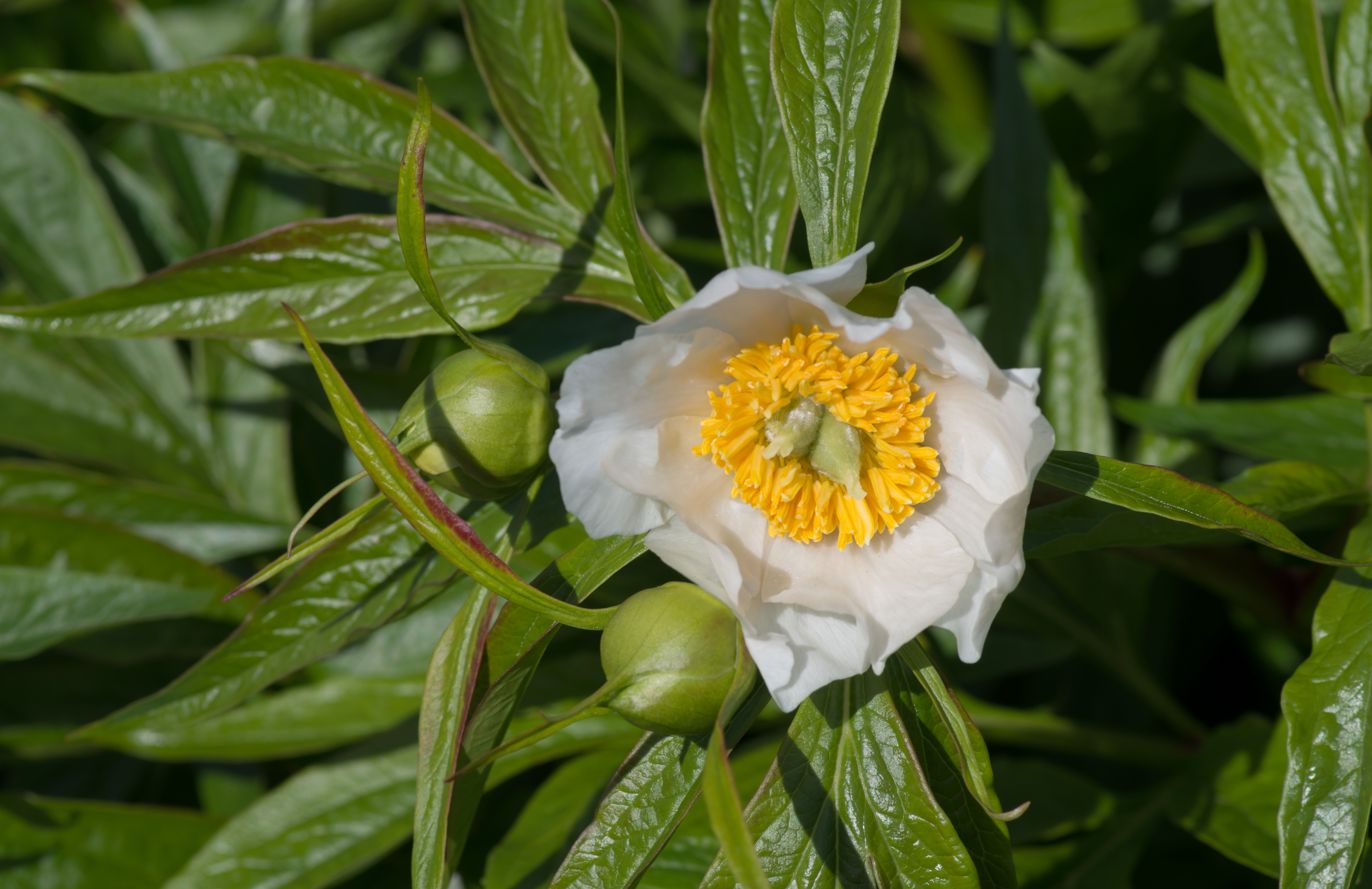
Paeonia emodi

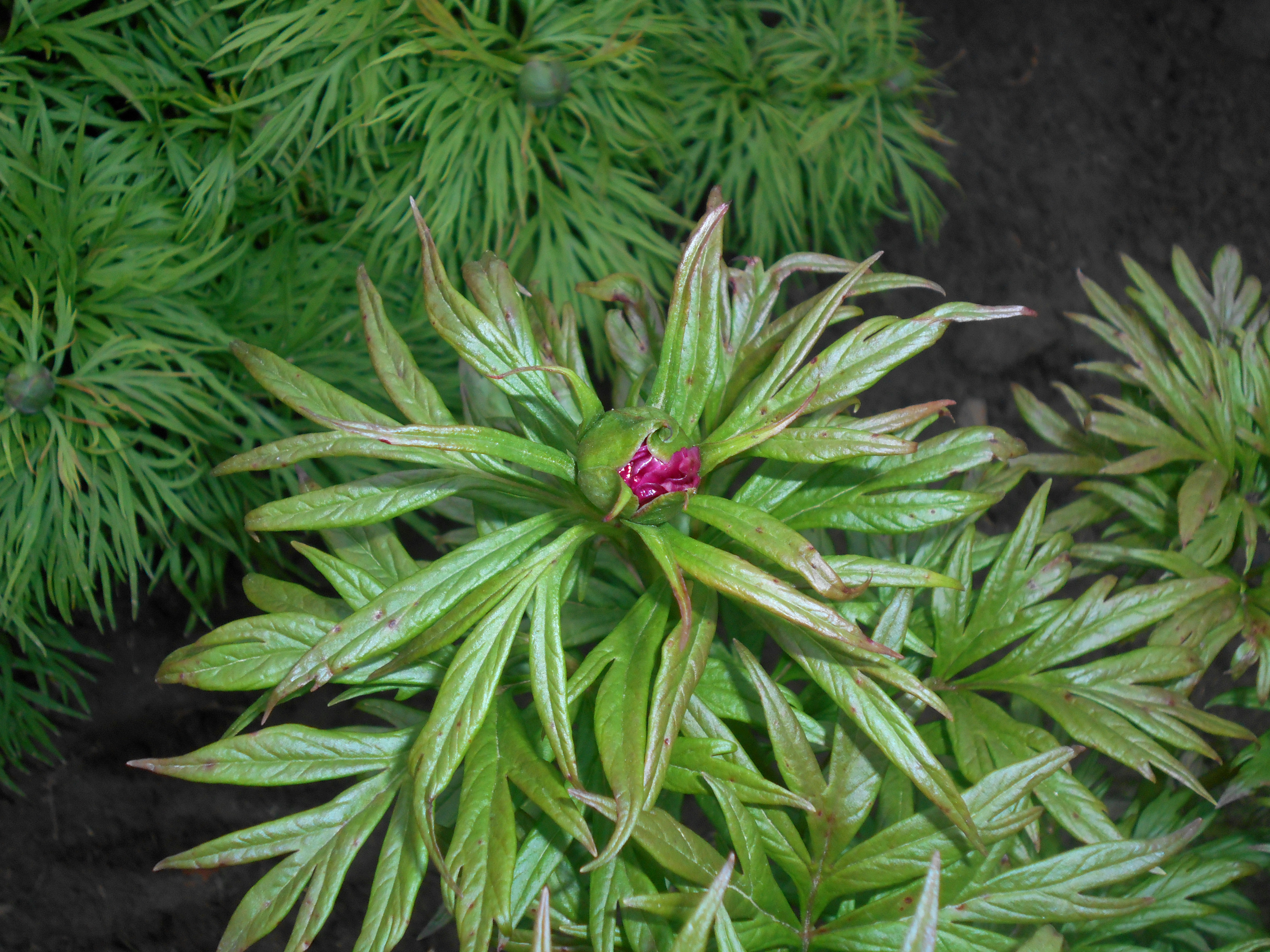
Paeonia intermedia

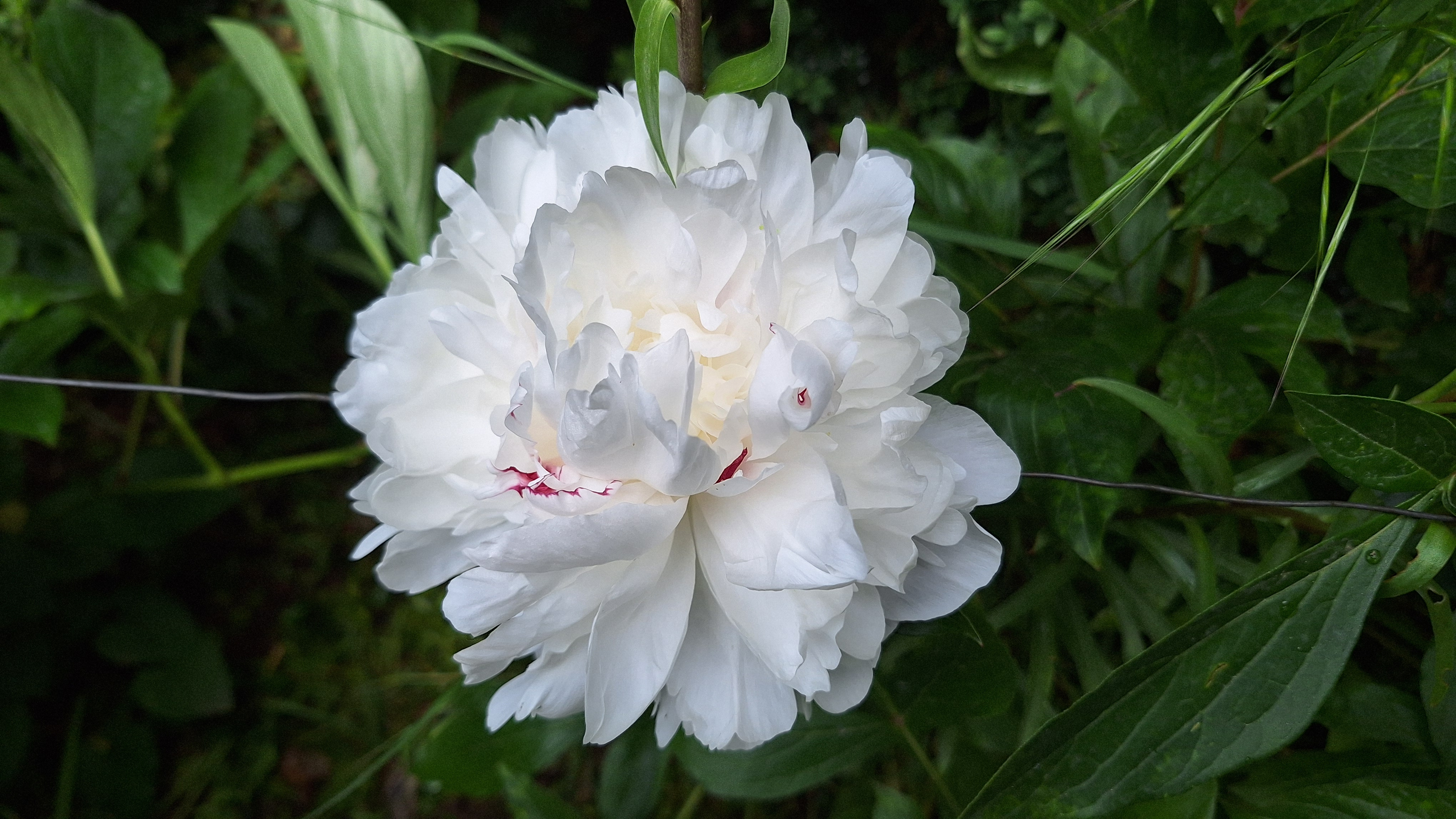
Paeonia lactiflora

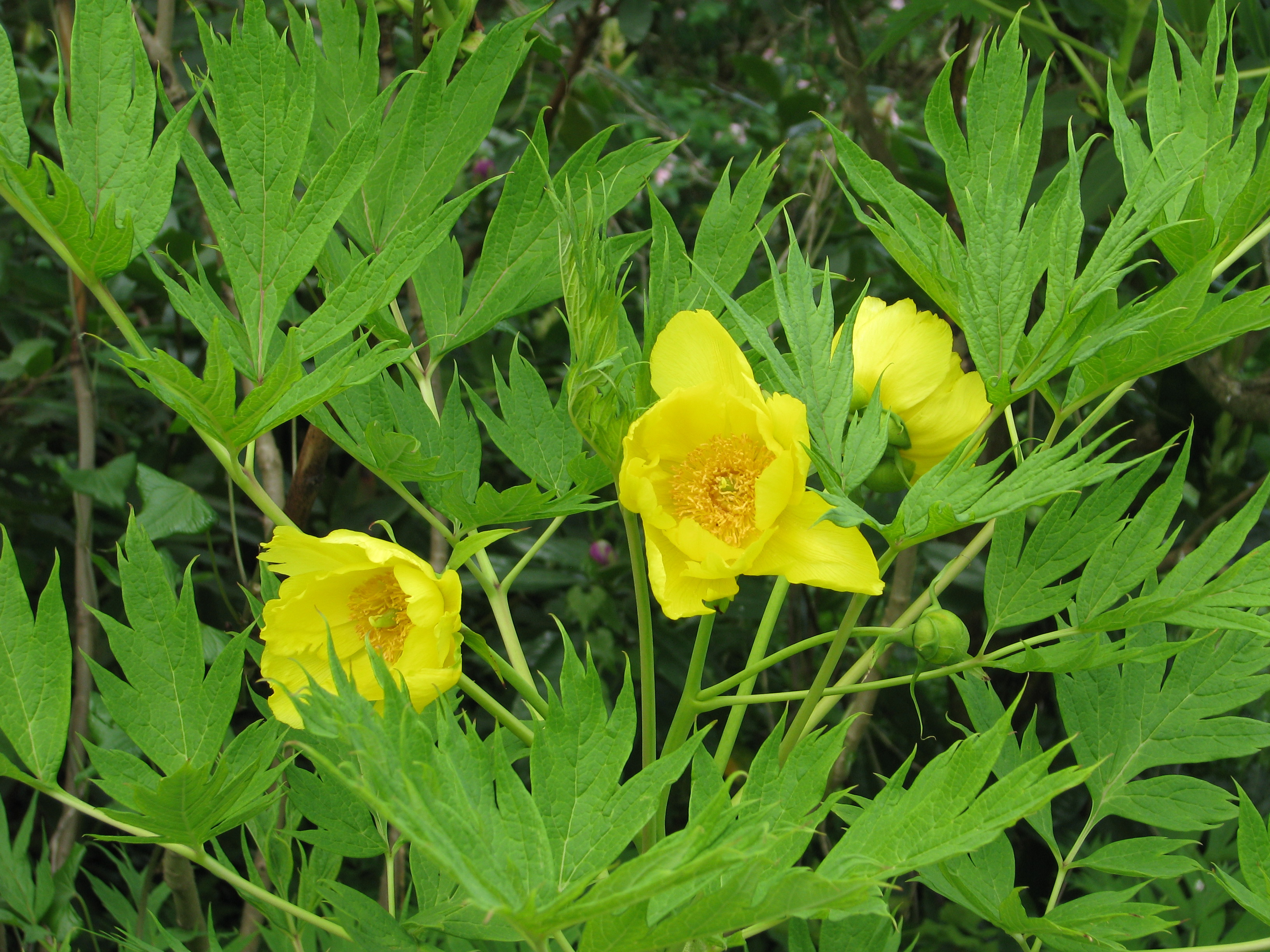
Paeonia ludlowii

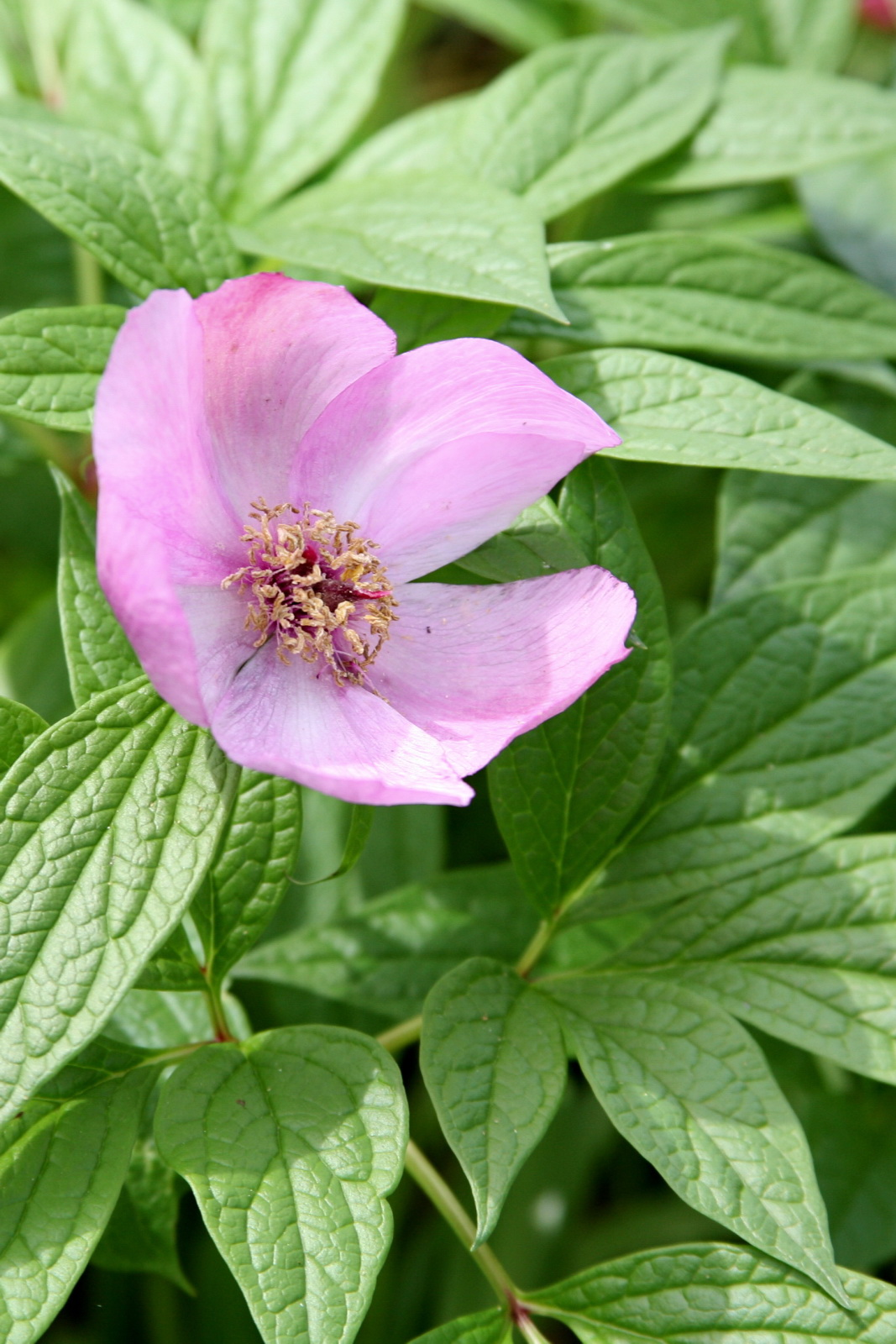
Paeonia mairei

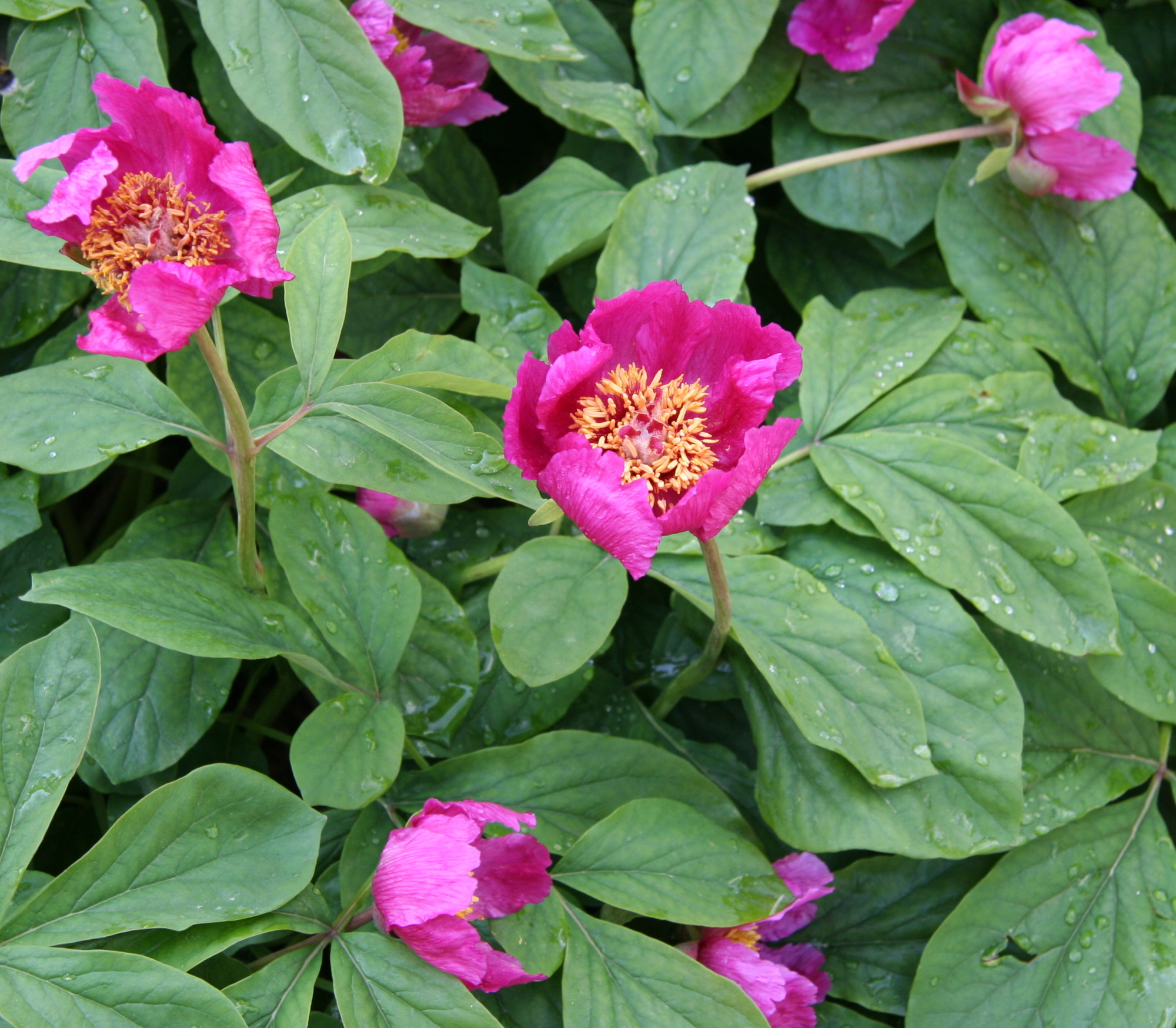
Paeonia mascula

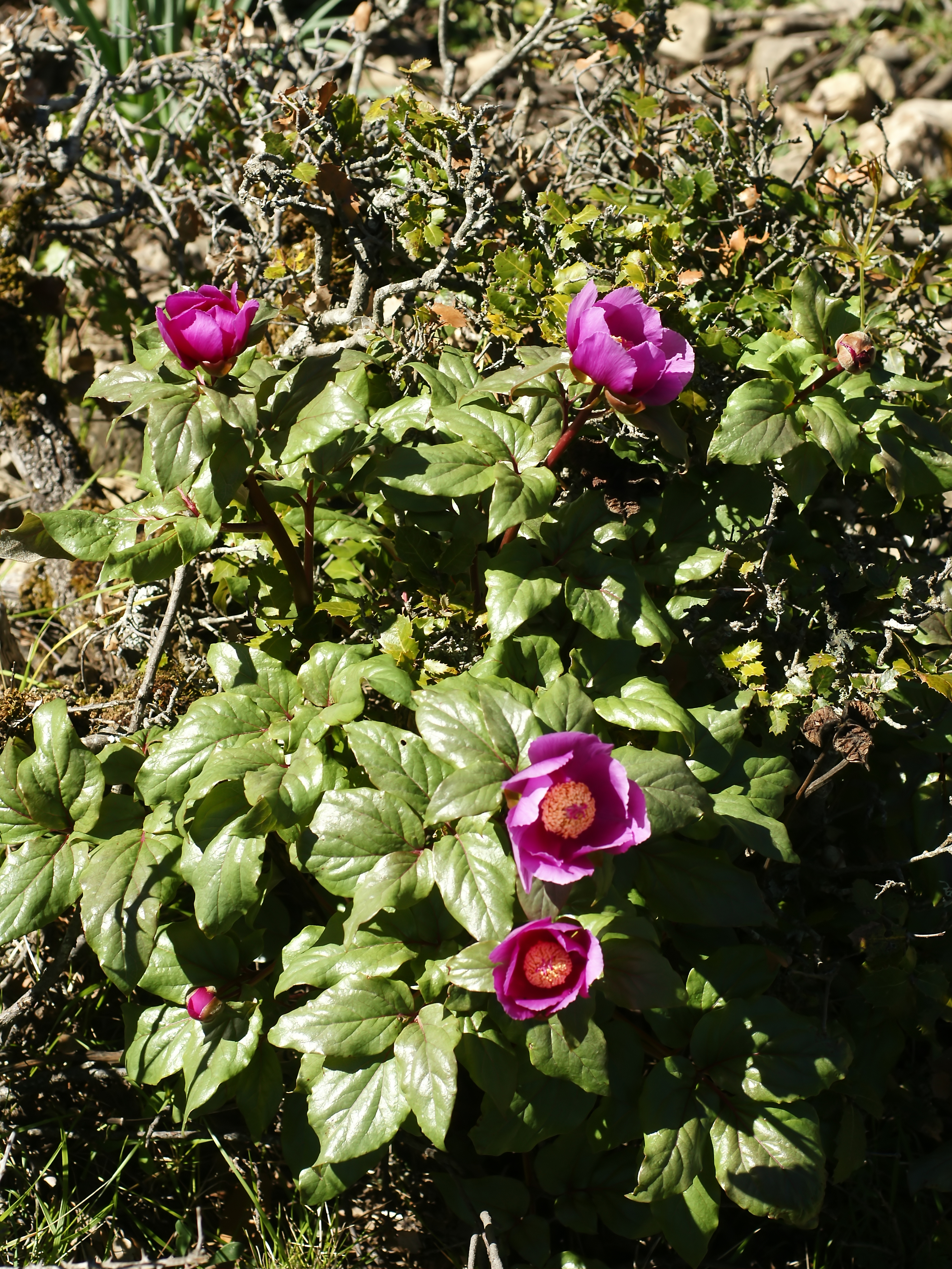
Paeonia mascula subsp. russoi

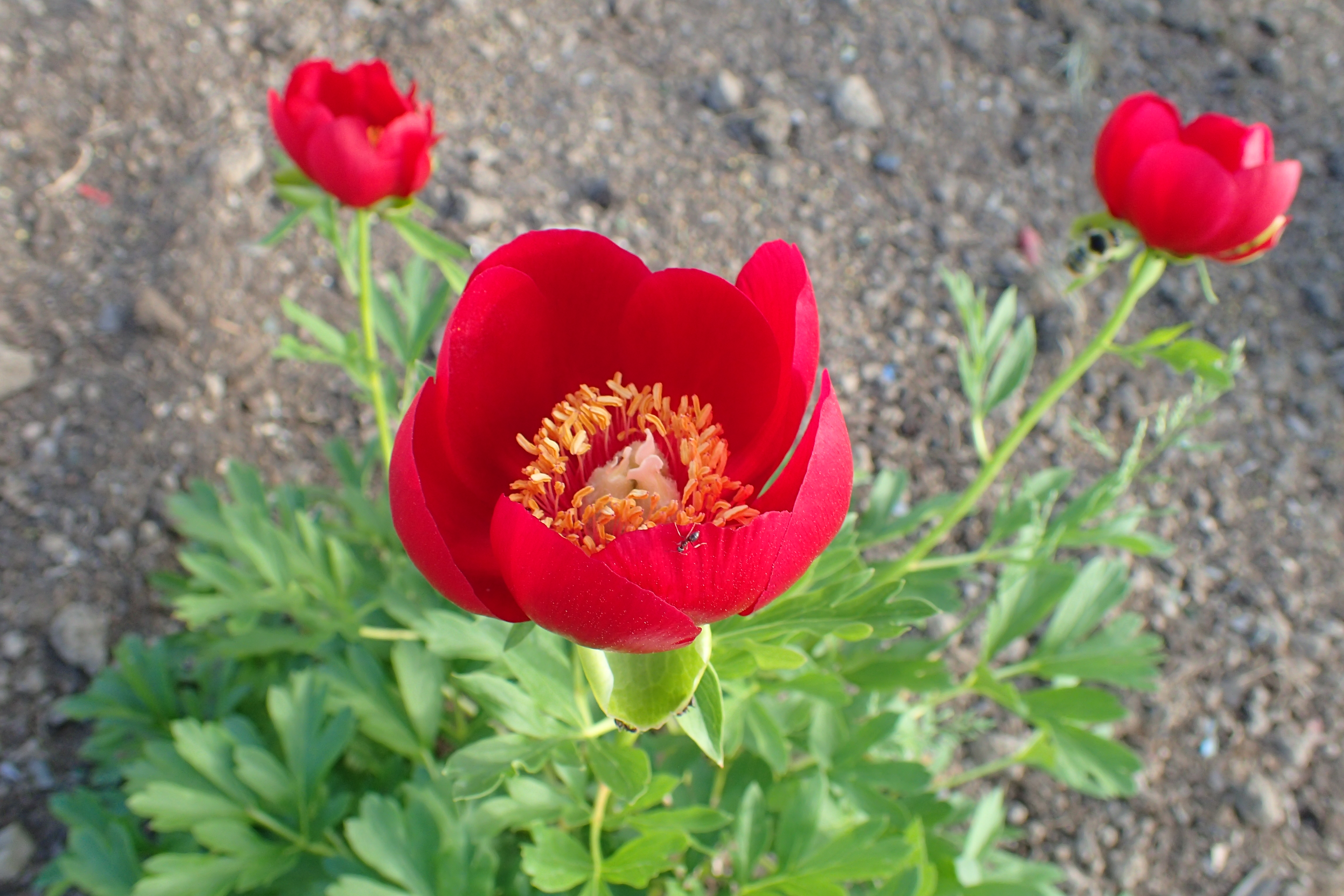
Paeonia peregrina

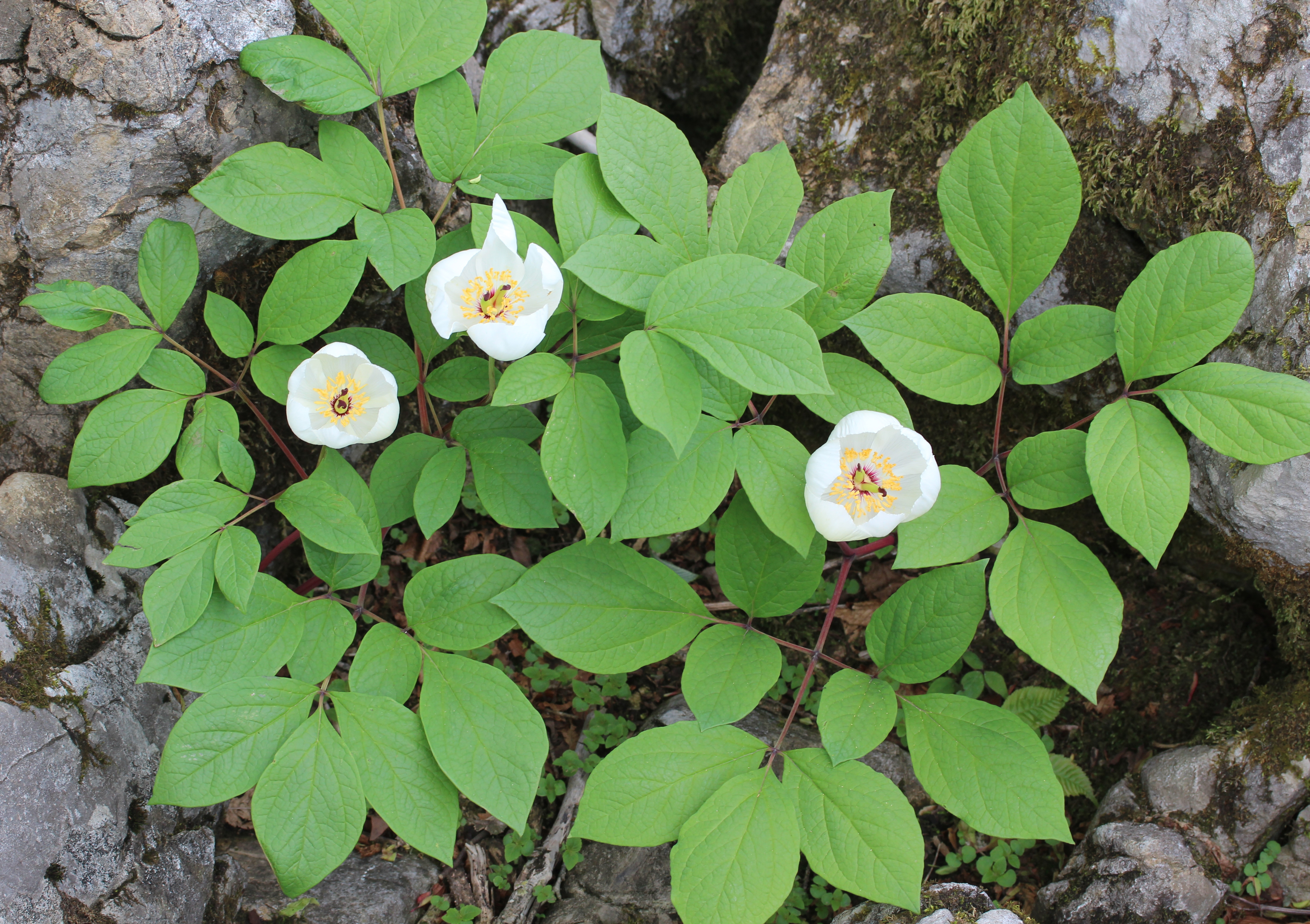
Paeonia obovata subsp. japonica

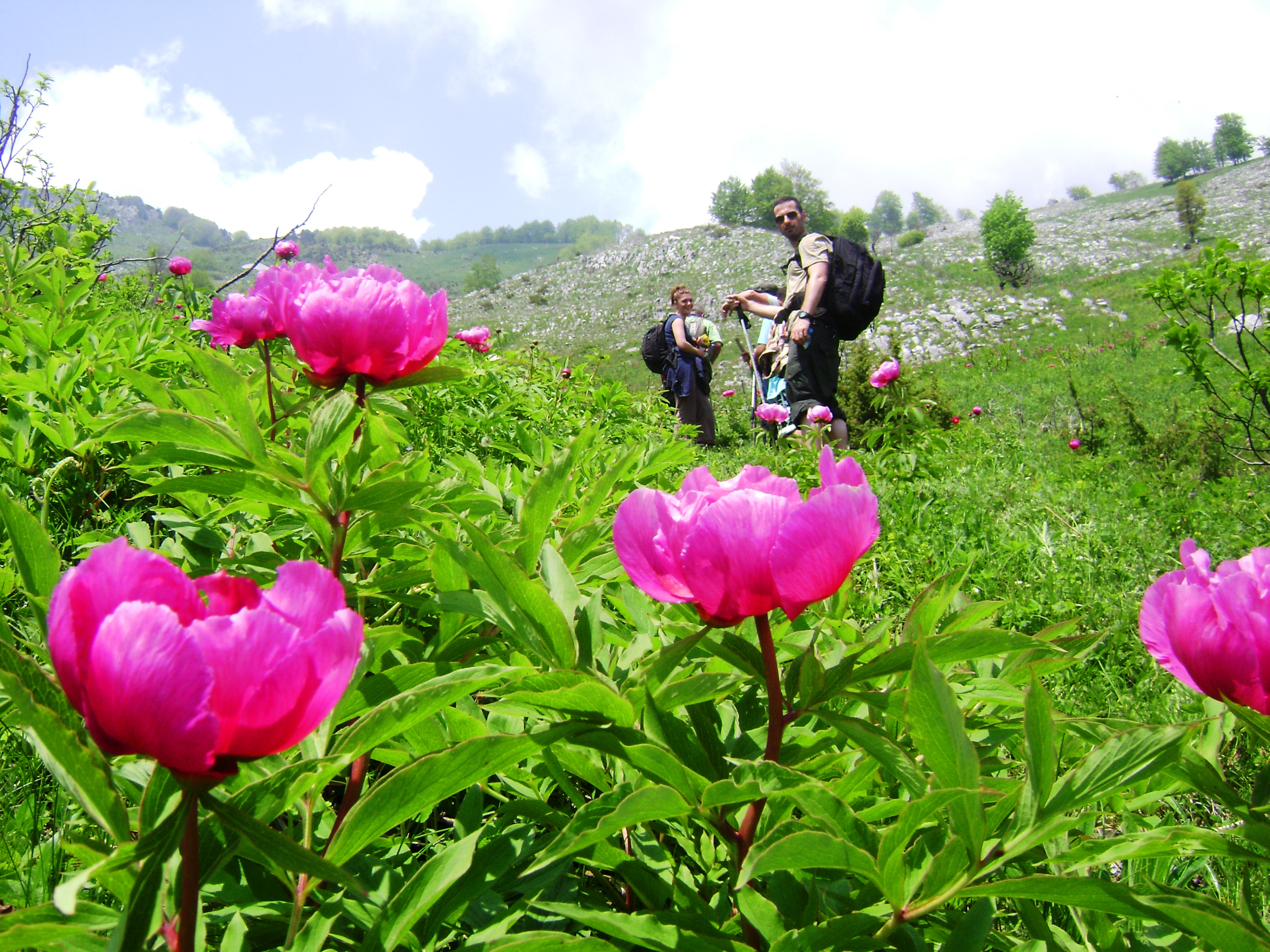
Paeonia officinalis

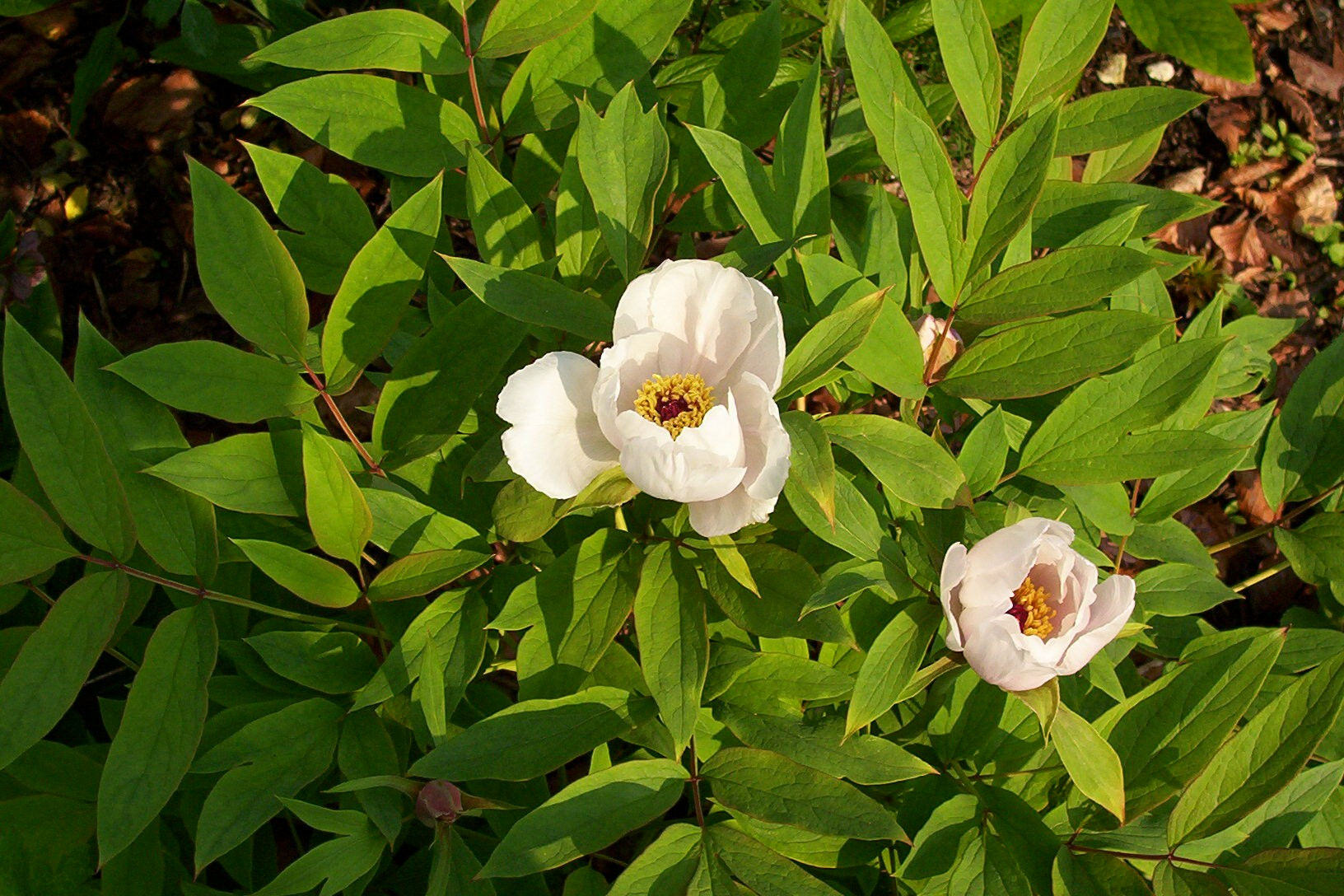
Paeonia ostii

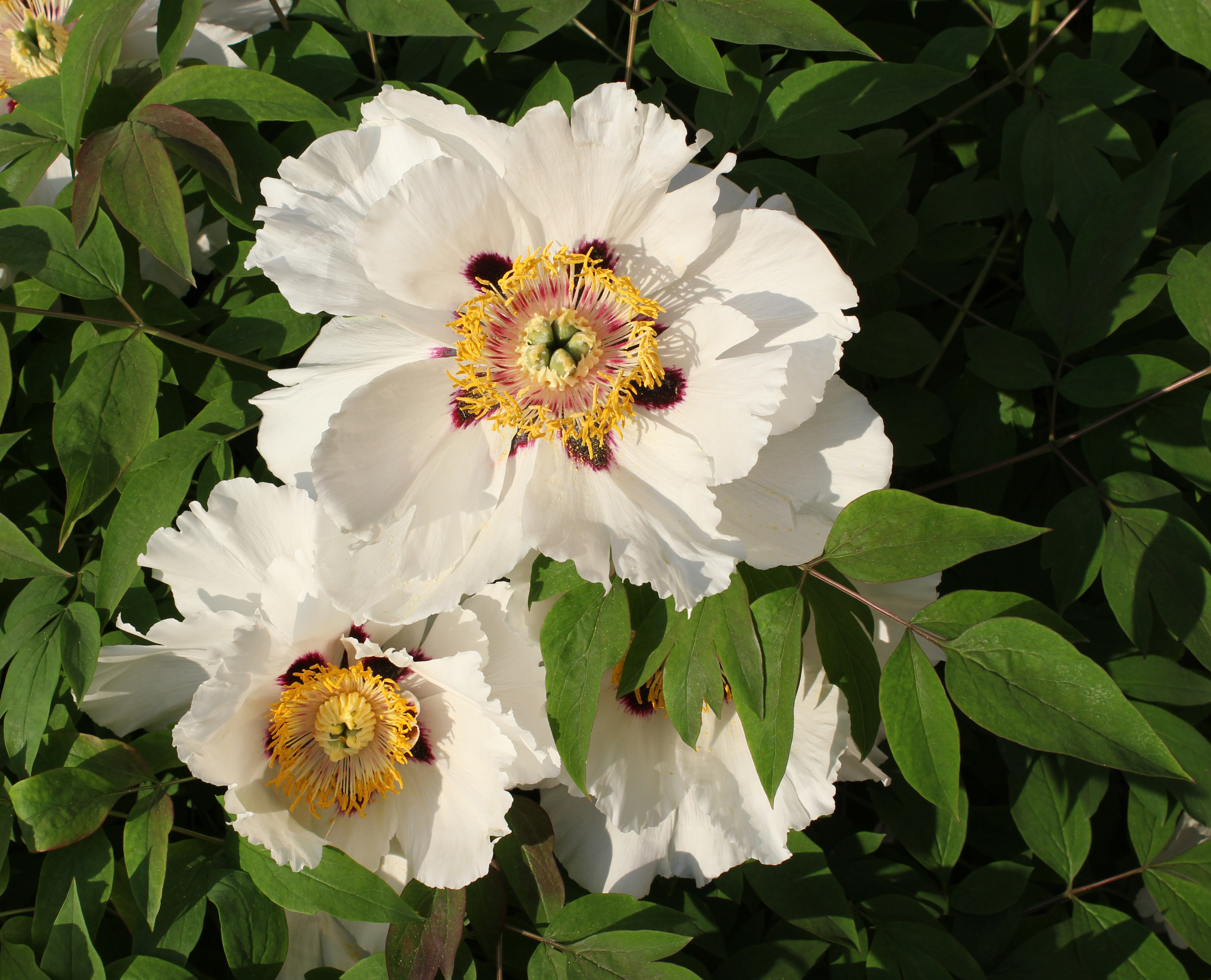
Paeonia rockii

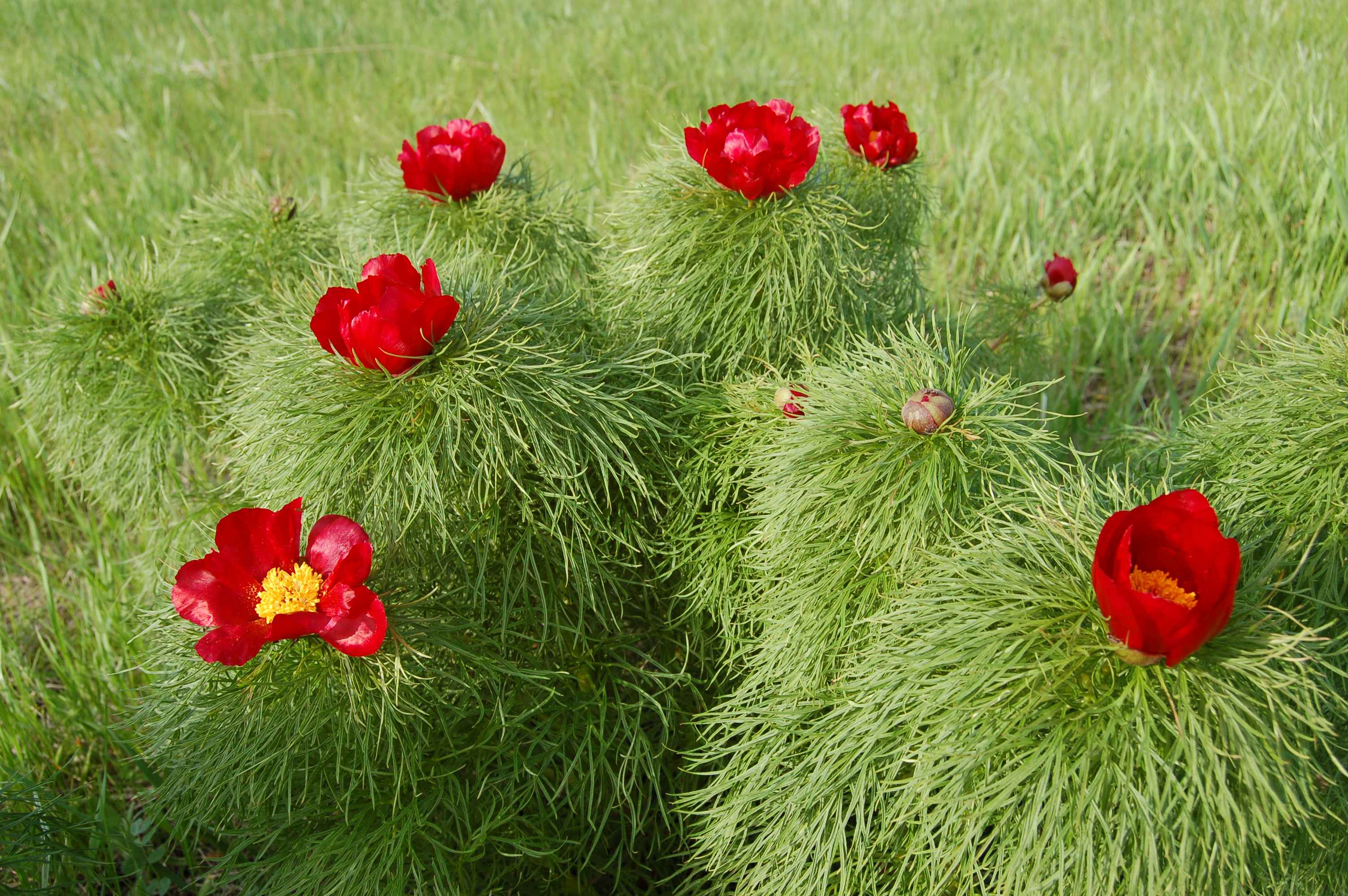
Paeonia tenuifolia

== Distribution ==
The genus Paeonia naturally occurs in the temperate and cold areas of the Northern Hemisphere. The section Moutan, which includes all woody species, is restricted in the wild to Central and Southern China, including Tibet. The section Onaepia consist of two herbaceous species and is present in the West of North-America, P. brownii between southern British Columbia and the Sierra Nevada in California and eastward to Wyoming and Utah, while P. californica is limited to the coastal mountains of Southern and Central California.

The section Paeonia, which comprises all other herbaceous species, occurs in a band stretching roughly from Morocco and Spain to Japan. One species of the section Paeonia, P. anomala, has by far the largest distribution, which is also north of the distribution of the other species: from the Kola Peninsula in North-West Russia, to Lake Baikal in Siberia and South to the Tien Shan Mountains of Kazakhstan. The rest of the section concentrates around the Mediterranean, and in Asia.

The species around the Mediterranean include Paeonia algeriensis that is an endemic of the coastal mountains of Algeria, P. coriacea in the Rif Mountains and Andalusia, P. cambessedesii on Mallorca, P. russoi on Corsica, Sardinia and Sicily, P. corsica on Corsica, Sardinia, the Ionian islands and in western Greece, P. clusii subsp. clusii on Crete and Karpathos, and subsp. rhodia on Rhodes, P. kesrouanensis in the Western Taurus Mountains, P. arietina from the Middle Taurus Mountains, P. broteri in Andalucia, P. humilis from Andalucia to the Provence, P. officinalis from the South of France, through Switzerland to the Middle of Italy, P. banatica in western Romania, northern Serbia and Slovenia and in southern Hungary, P. peregrina in Albania, western Bulgaria, northern Greece, western Romania, Serbia, Montenegro and Bosnia, while P. mascula has a large distribution from Catalonia and southern France to Israel and Turkey.

Between the two concentrations, the subspecies of Paeonia daurica occur, with subspecies velebitensis in Croatia, and daurica in the Balkans and Crimea, while the other subspecies coriifolia, macrophylla, mlokosewitschii, tomentosa and wittmanniana are known from the Caucasus, Kaçkar and Alborz Mountains.

Paeonia emodi occurs in the western Himalayas between Pakistan and western Nepal, P. sterniana is an endemic of southeastern Tibet, P. veitchii grows in Central China (Qinghai, Ningxia, Gansu, Shaanxi, Shanxi, Sichuan and the eastern rim of Tibet), like P. mairei (Gansu, Guizhou, Hubei, Shaanxi, Sichuan, and Yunnan), while P. obovata grows in warm-temperate to cold China, including Manchuria, Korea, Japan, Far Eastern Russia (Primorsky Krai) and on Sakhalin, and P. lactiflora occurs in Northern China, including Manchuria, Japan, Korea, Mongolia, Russia (Far East and Siberia).

=== Distributional history ===
The species of the section Paeonia have a disjunct distribution, with most of the species occurring in the Mediterranean, while many others occur in eastern Asia. Genetic analysis has shown that all Mediterranean species are either diploid or tetraploid hybrids that resulted from the crossbreeding of species currently limited to eastern Asia. The large distance between the ranges of the parent species and the nothospecies suggest that hybridisation already occurred relatively long ago. It is likely that the parent species occurred in the same region when the hybrids arose, and were later exterminated by successive Pleistocene glaciations, while the nothospecies remained in refugia to the South of Europe. During their retreat, P. lactiflora and P. mairei likely became sympatric and so produced the Himalayan nothospecies P. emodi and P. sterniana.

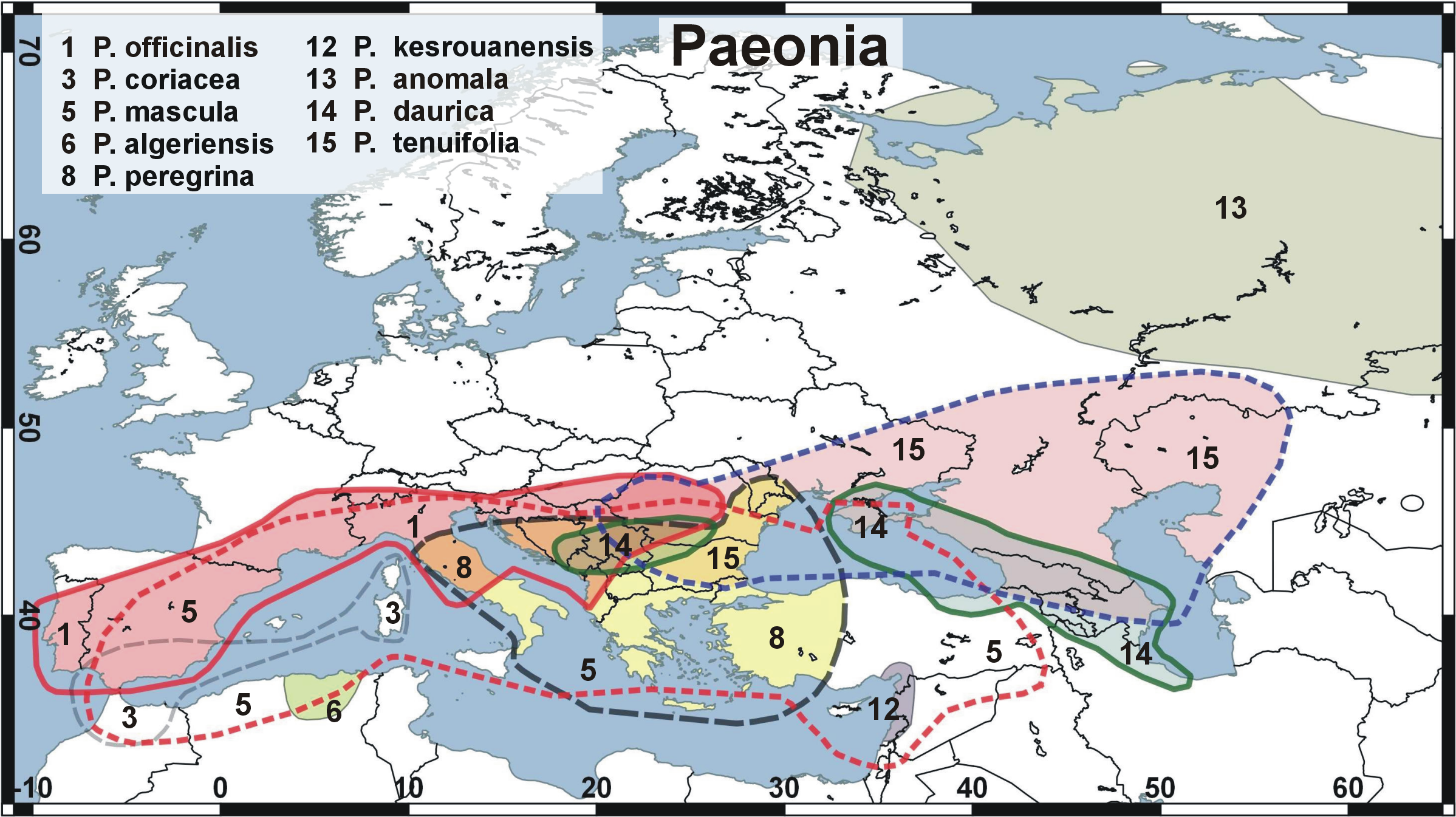
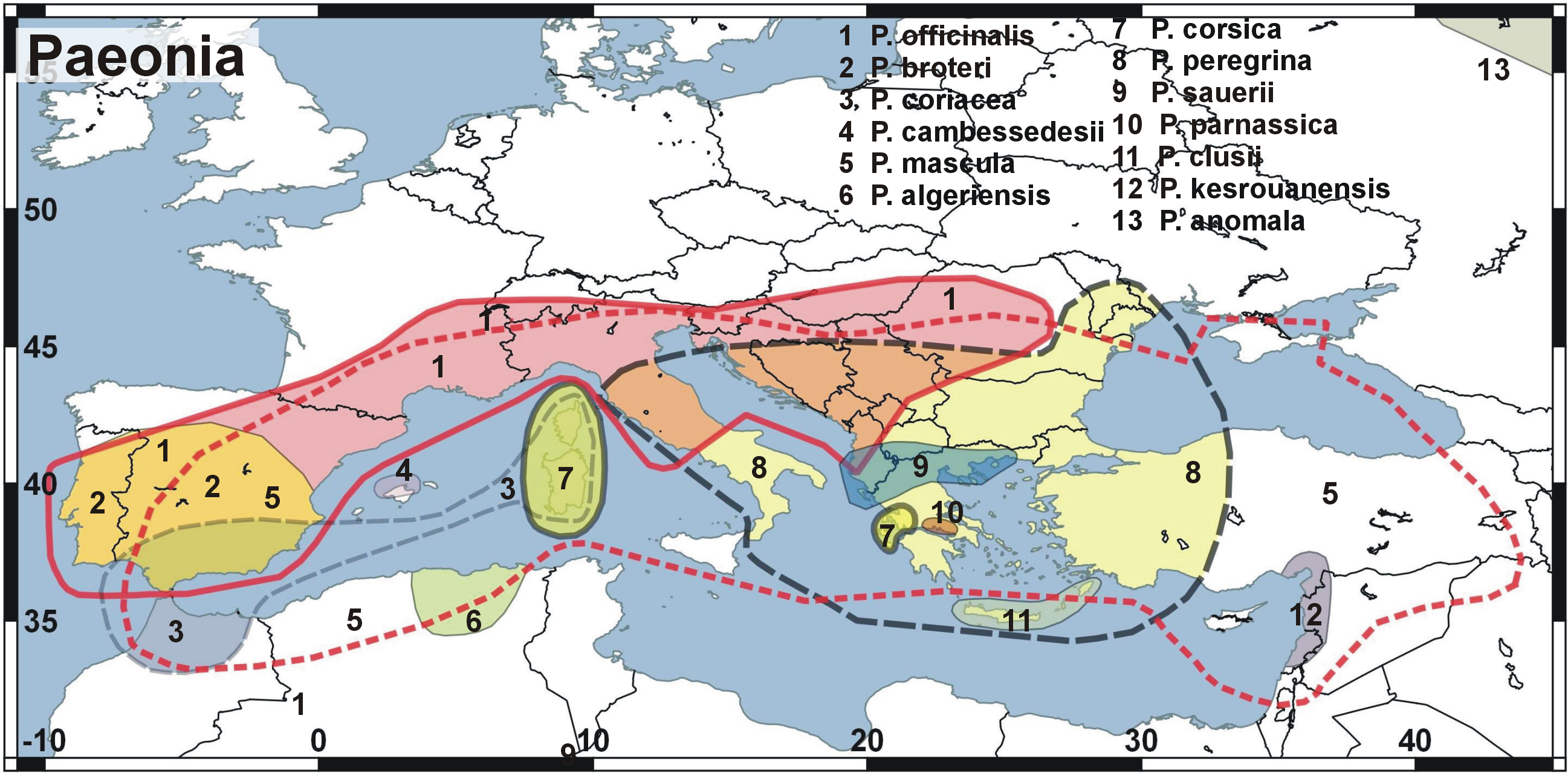
Distribution maps of the species of Paeonia in Europe and Western Asia

== Cultivation ==
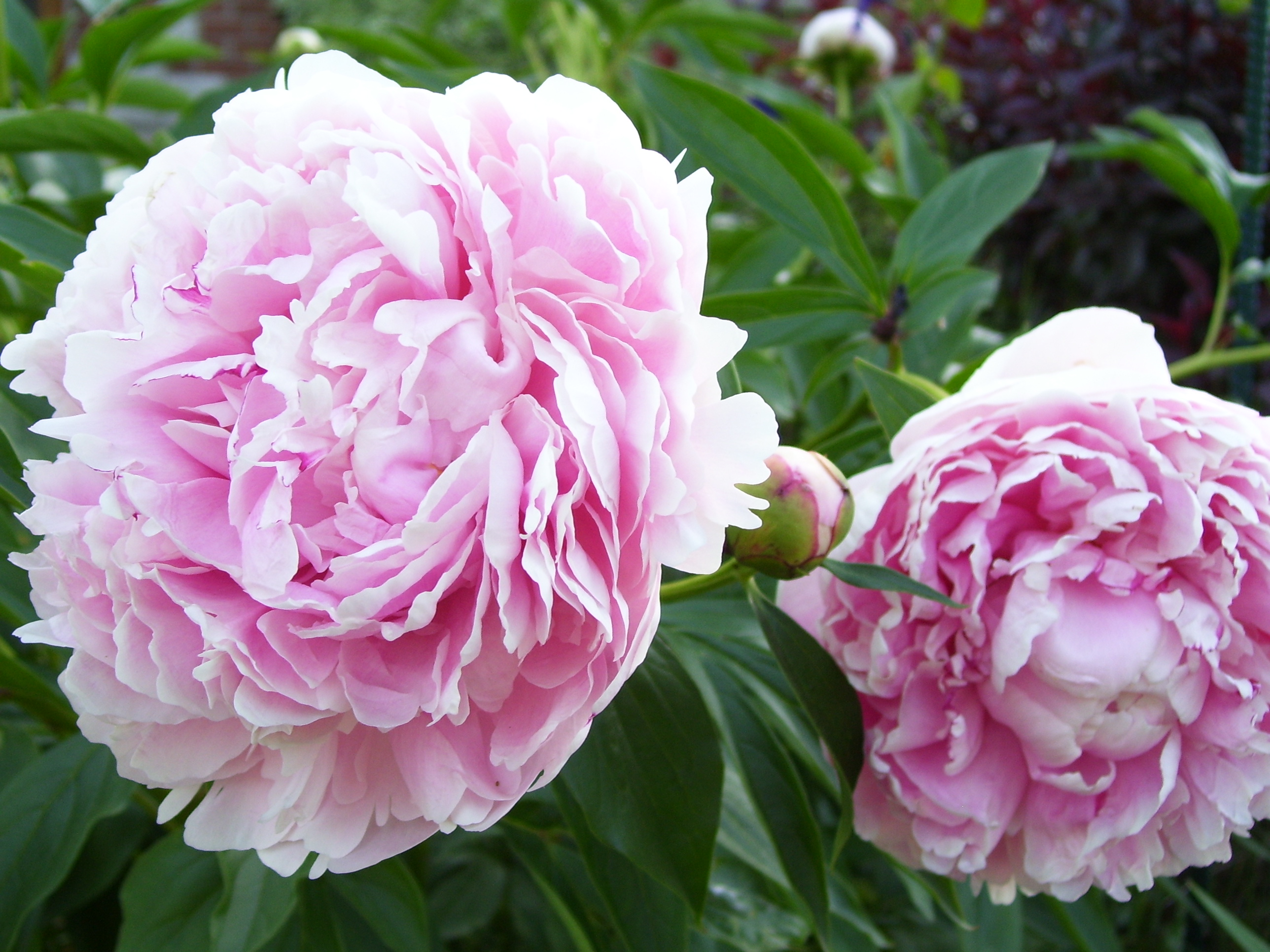
Paeonia 'Sarah Bernhardt'

Ancient Chinese texts mention the peony was used for flavoring food. Peonies have been used and cultivated in China since early history. Ornamental cultivars were created from plants cultivated for medicine in China as of the sixth and seventh century. Peonies became particularly popular during the Tang dynasty, when they were grown in the imperial gardens. In the tenth century the cultivation of peonies spread through China, and the seat of the Song dynasty, Luoyang, was the centre for its cultivation, a position it still holds today.

A second centre for peony cultivation developed during the Qing dynasty in Cáozhōu, now known as He Ze. Both cities still host annual peony exhibitions and state-funded peony research facilities. Before the tenth century, P. lactiflora was introduced in Japan, and over time many varieties were developed both by self fertilisation and crossbreeding, particularly during the eighteenth to twentieth centuries (middle Edo to early Shōwa periods). During the 1940s Toichi Itoh succeeded in crossing tree peonies and herbaceous peonies and so created a new class of so-called intersectional hybrids. Although P. officinalis and its cultivars were grown in Europe from the fifteenth century on, originally also for medicinal purposes, intensive breeding started only in the nineteenth century when P. lactiflora was introduced from its native China to Europe. The tree peony was introduced in Europe and planted in Kew Gardens in 1789. The main centre of peony breeding in Europe has been in the United Kingdom, and particularly France. Here, breeders like Victor Lemoine and François Félix Crousse selected many new varieties, mainly with P. lactiflora, such as 'Avant Garde' and 'Le Printemps'. The Netherlands is the largest peony cut flower producing country with about 50 million stems each year, with 'Sarah Bernhardt' dominating the sales with over 20 million stems. An emerging source of peonies in mid to late summer is the Alaskan market. Unique growing conditions due to long hours of sunlight create availability from Alaska when other sources have completed harvest.

=== Plant growth habits ===
While the peony takes several years to re-establish itself when moved, it blooms annually for decades once it has done so.

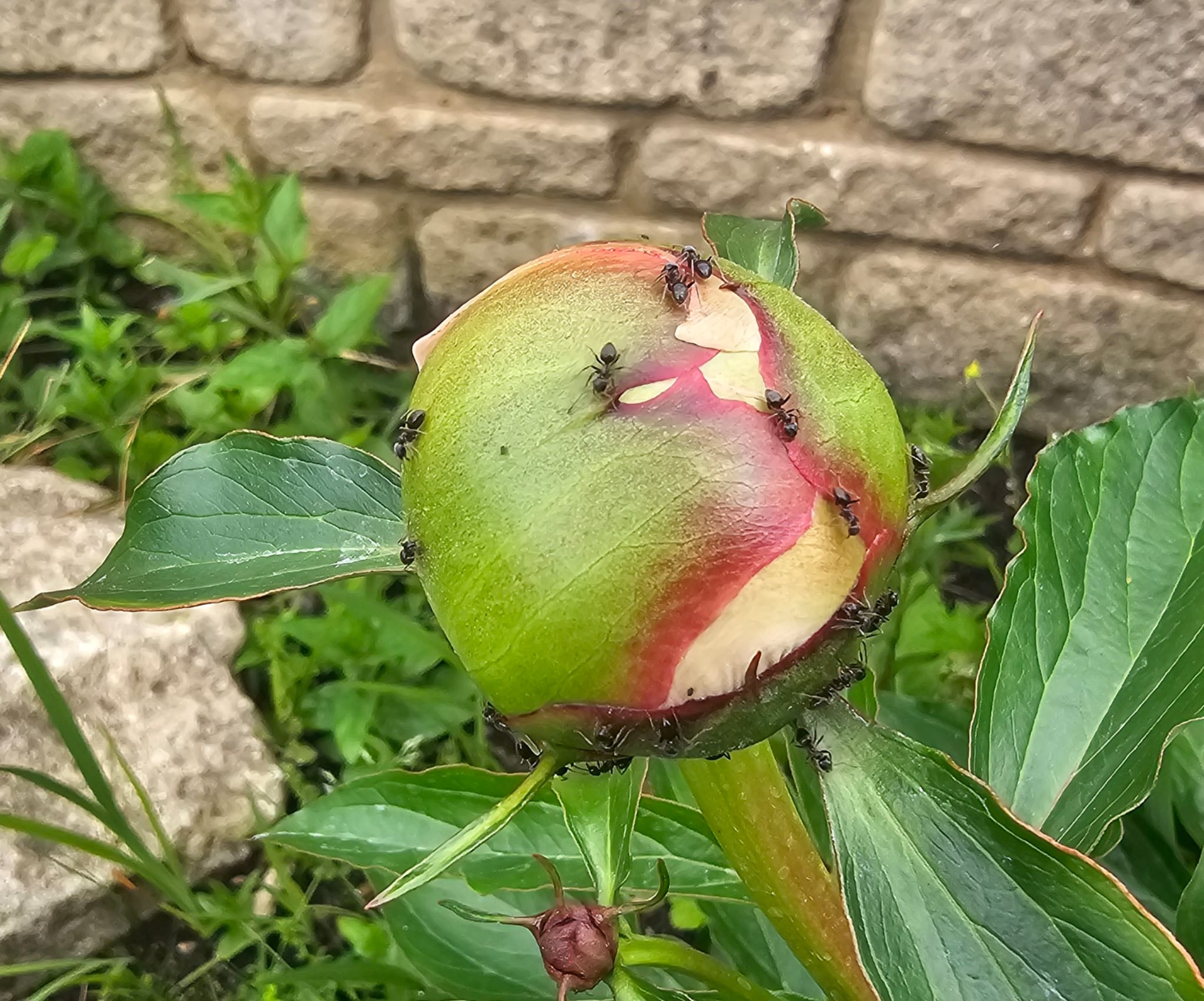
Ants on a bud

Peonies tend to attract ants to the flower buds. This is due to the nectar that forms on the outside of the flower buds, and is not required for the plants' own pollination or other growth. The presence of ants is thought to provide some deterrence to other harmful insects though, so the production of ant-attracting nectar is plausibly a functional adaptation. Ants do not harm the plants.

Peony species come in two distinct growth habits, while hybrid cultivars in addition may occupy an intermediate habit.

- herbaceous: During summer, renewal buds develop on the underground stem (the "crown"), particularly at the foot of the current season's annual shoots. These renewal buds come in various sizes. Large buds will grow into stems the following growing season, but smaller buds remain dormant. The primordia for the leaves can already be found in June, but the flower only starts differentiating in October, as the annual shoots die down, completing its development in December, when sepals, petals, stamens and pistils are all recognisable.
- tree: During the summer, large buds develop at the tip of the annual growth and near its foot. In the autumn, the leaves are shed, and the new stems become woody and are perennial.
- Itoh (or "Intersectional"): In 1948 horticulturist Toichi Itoh from Tokyo used pollen from the yellow tree peony 'Alice Harding' to fertilise the herbaceous P. lactiflora 'Katoden', which resulted in a new category of peonies, the Itoh or intersectional cultivars. These are herbaceous, have leaves like tree peonies, with many large flowers from late spring to early autumn, and good peony wilt resistance. Some of the early Itoh cultivars are 'Yellow Crown', 'Yellow Dream', "'Yellow Emperor' and 'Yellow Heaven'.

=== Flower types ===
Time lapse of a peony flower blooming

Seven types of flower are generally distinguished in cultivars of herbaceous peonies.

- single: a single or double row of broad petals encircle fertile stamens, carpels visible.
- Japanese: a single or double row of broad petals encircle somewhat broadened staminodes, may carry pollen along the edges, carpels visible.
- anemone: a single or double row of broad petals encircle narrow incurved petal-like staminodes; fertile stamens are absent, carpels visible.
- triple: the flower consists of triple row of broad petals that broaden and overlap each other.
- semi-double: a single or double row of broad petals encircles further broad petals intermingled with stamens.
- bomb: a single row of broad petals encircles a shorter dense pompon of narrower petals.
- double: the flower consists of many broad petals only, including those which likely are altered stamens and carpels.
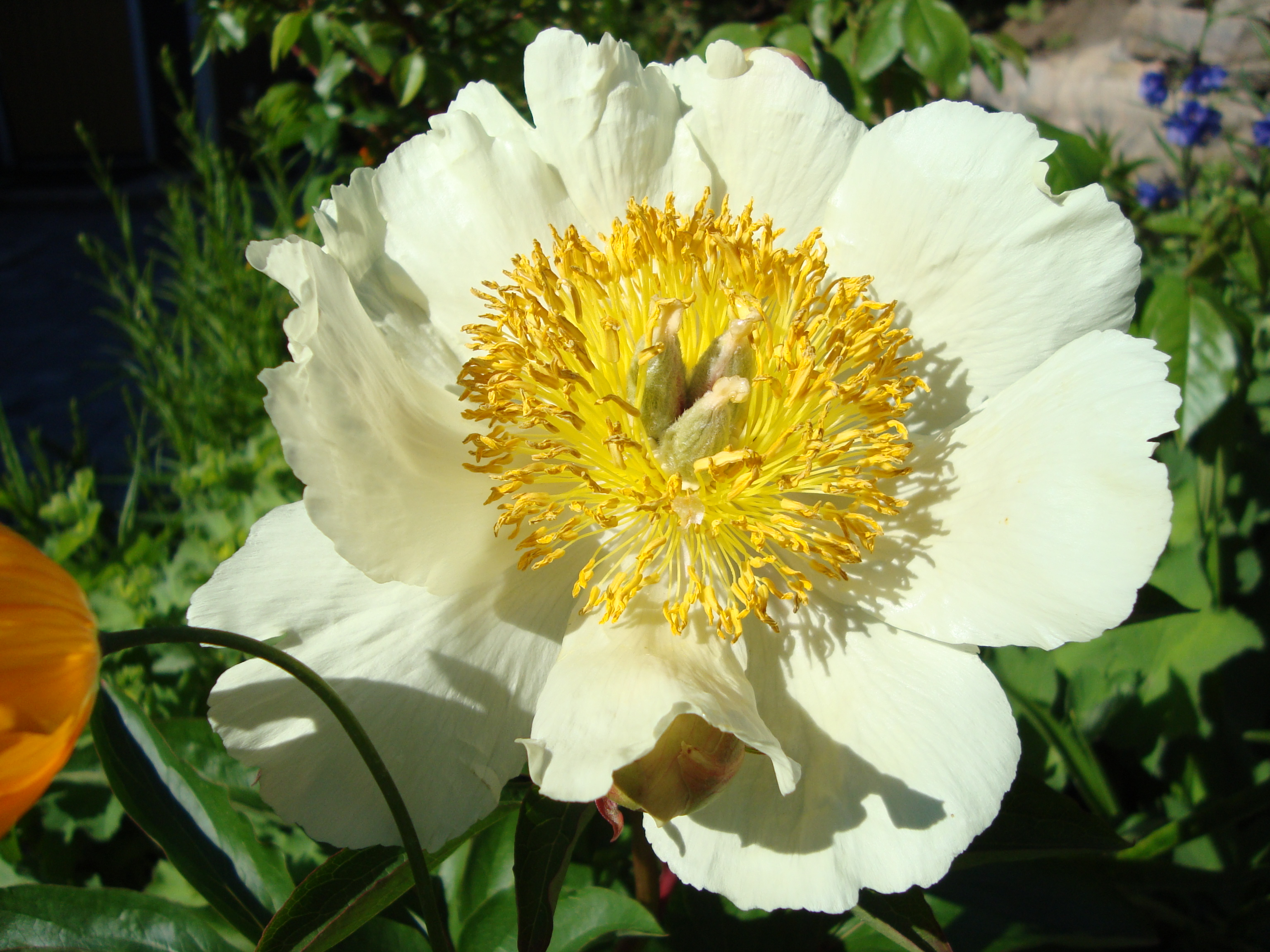
Paeonia ×arendsii 'Claire de Lune',
single flowered

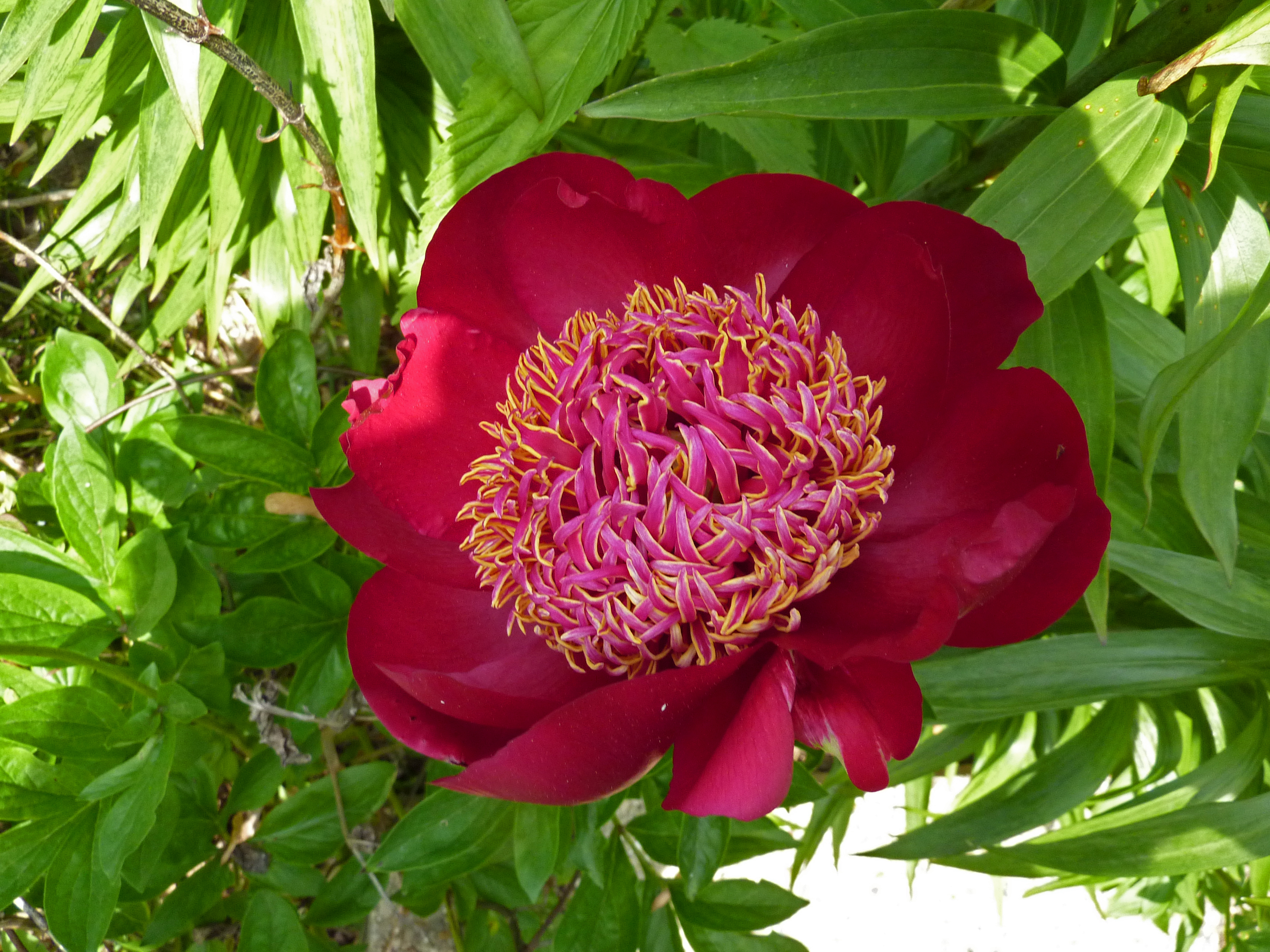
Paeonia 'Walter Mains',
Japanese flowered

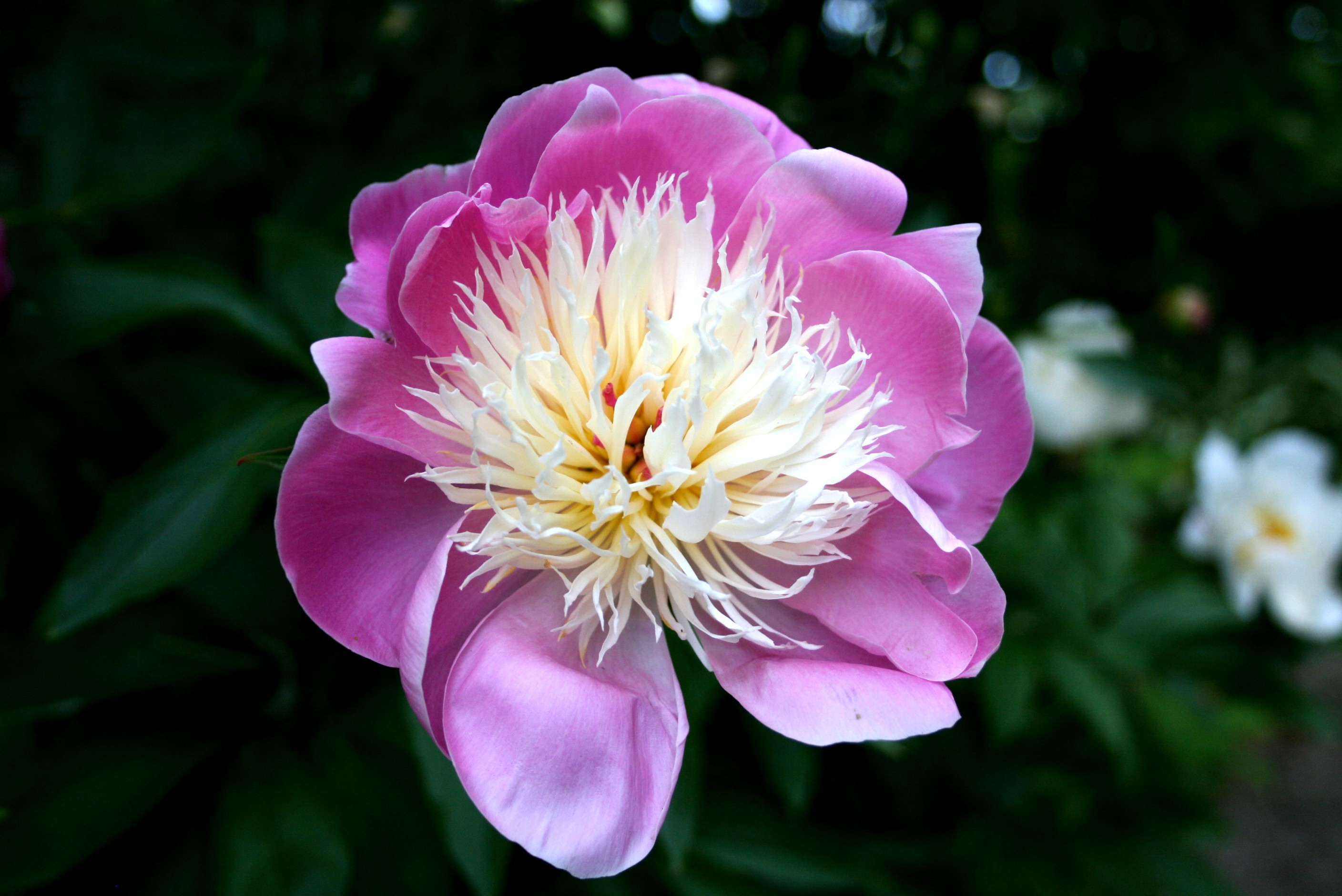
Paeonia lactiflora 'Bowl Of Beauty',
anemone flowered

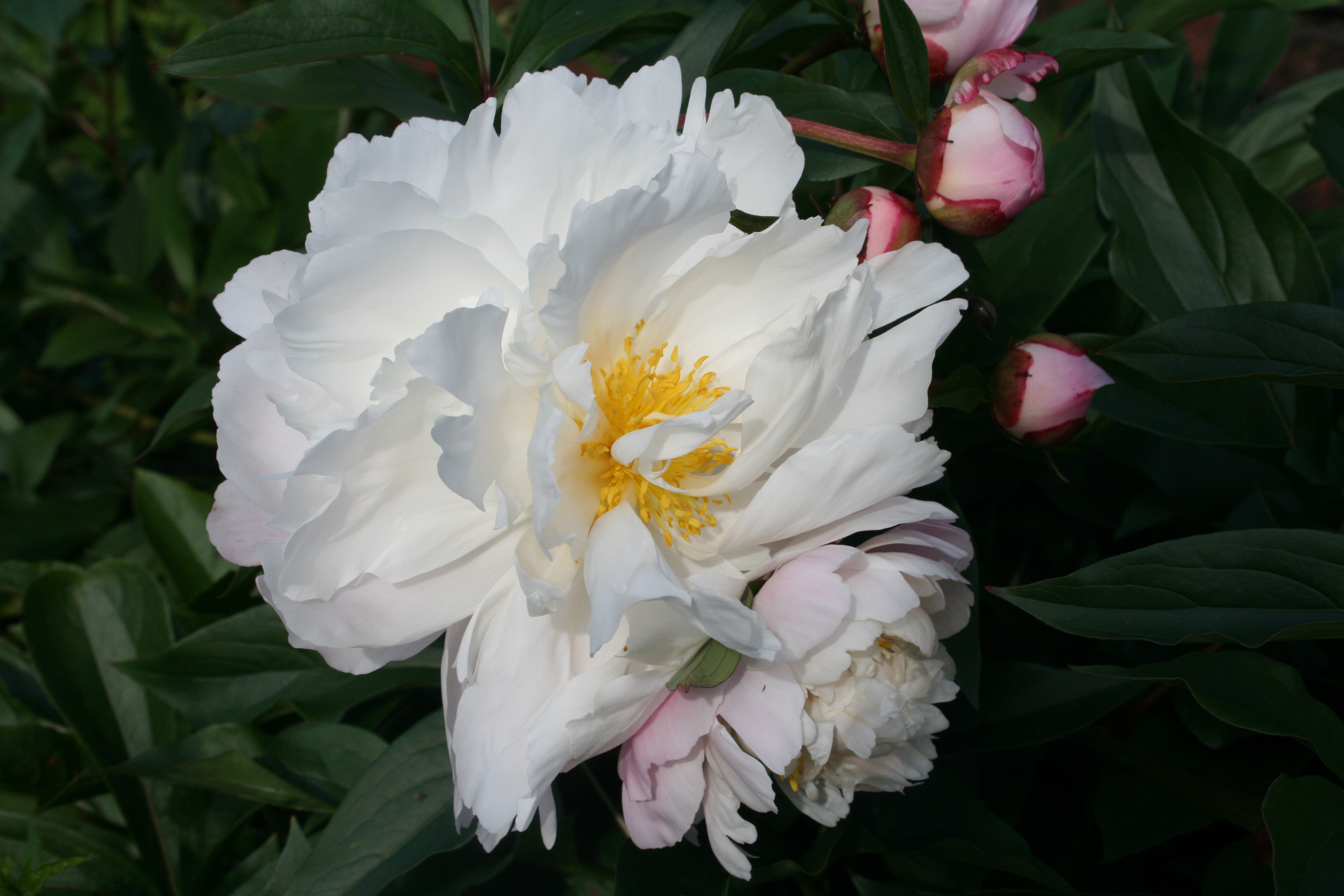
Paeonia lactiflora 'James Kelway',
semi-double flowered

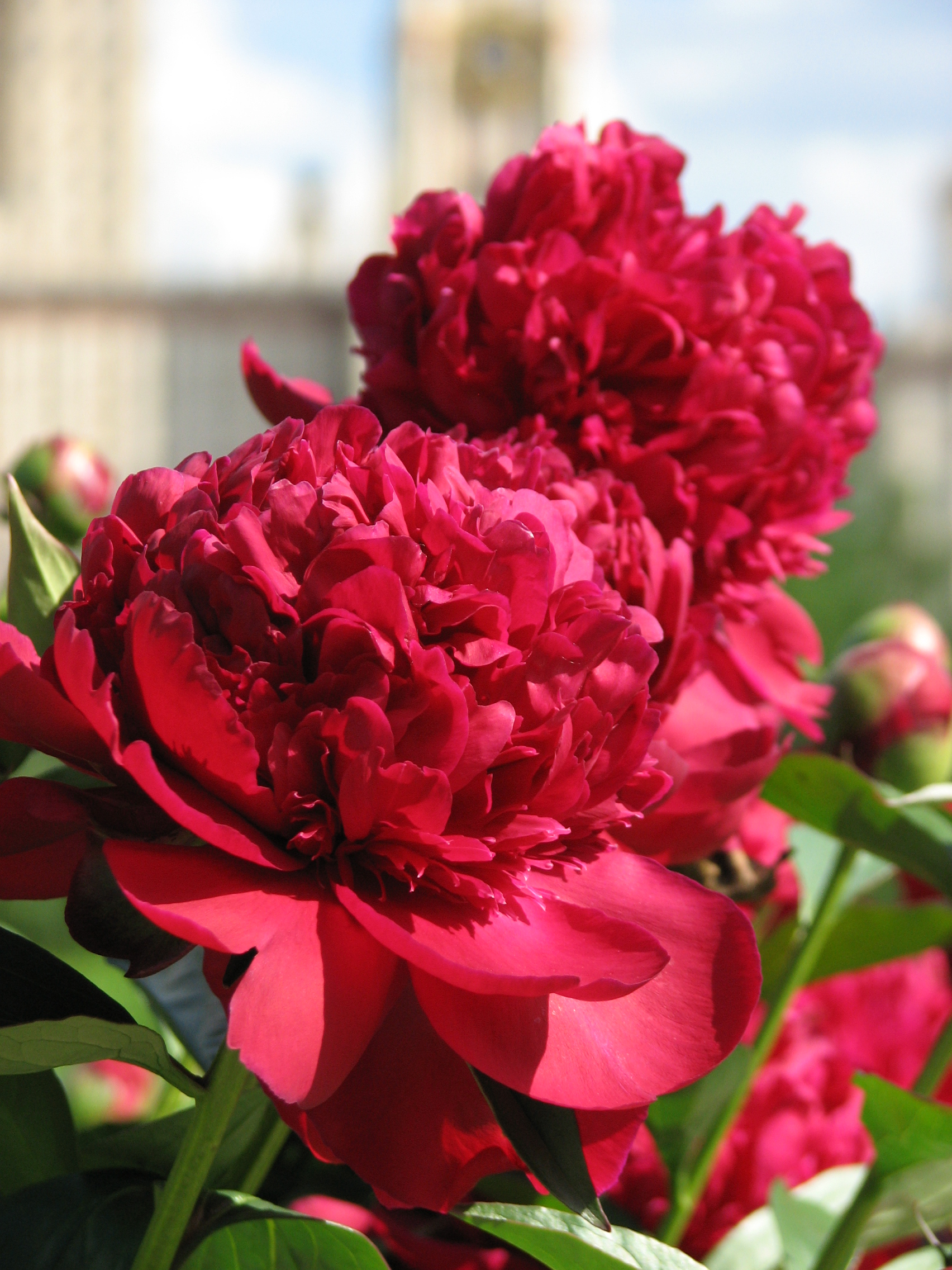
Paeonia 'Ruth Clay',
bomb flowered

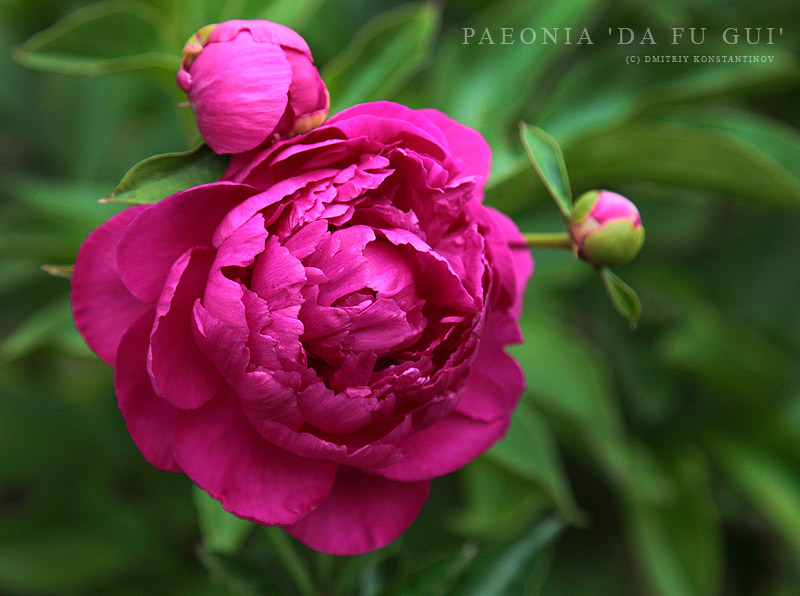
Paeonia lactiflora 'Da Fu Gui',
double flowered

=== Propagation ===
Herbaceous and Itoh peonies are propagated by root division, and sometimes by seed. Tree peonies can be propagated by grafting, division, seed, and from cuttings, although root grafting is most common commercially.

Herbaceous peonies such as Paeonia lactiflora, will die back to ground level each autumn. Their stems will reappear the following spring. However tree peonies, such as Paeonia suffruticosa, are shrubbier. They produce permanent woody stems that will lose their leaves in winter but the stem itself remains intact above ground level.

=== Cultivars ===
The numerous peony hybrids and cultivars have gained the Royal Horticultural Society's Award of Garden Merit, including:

- 'Bartzella', a double yellow-flowered Itoh (intersectional) peony
- 'Coral Charm', a semi-double salmon-pink-flowered herbaceous peony
- Paeonia × festiva 'Rubra Plena', a bomb red-flowered herbaceous peony
- Paeonia × lemoinei 'High Noon', a semi-double yellow-flowered tree peony

The American Peony Society is the International Cultivar Registration Authority for the genus, and accepts over 7,000 registered cultivars.

== Uses ==
The herb known as Paeonia, in particular the root of P. lactiflora (Bai Shao, Radix Paeoniae Lactiflorae), has been used frequently in traditional medicines of Korea, China and Japan. In Japan, Paeonia lactiflora used to be called ebisugusuri ("foreign medicine"). Pronunciation of 牡丹 (peony) in Japan is botan. In kampo, the Japanese adaptation of Chinese medicine, its root was used as a treatment for convulsions. It is also cultivated as a garden plant. In Japan, Paeonia suffruticosa is called the "King of Flowers" and Paeonia lactiflora is called the "Prime Minister of Flowers".

In China, the fallen petals of Paeonia lactiflora are parboiled and sweetened as a tea-time delicacy. Peony water, an infusion of peony petals, was used for drinking in the Middle Ages. The petals may be added to salads or to punches and lemonades.

== Culture ==
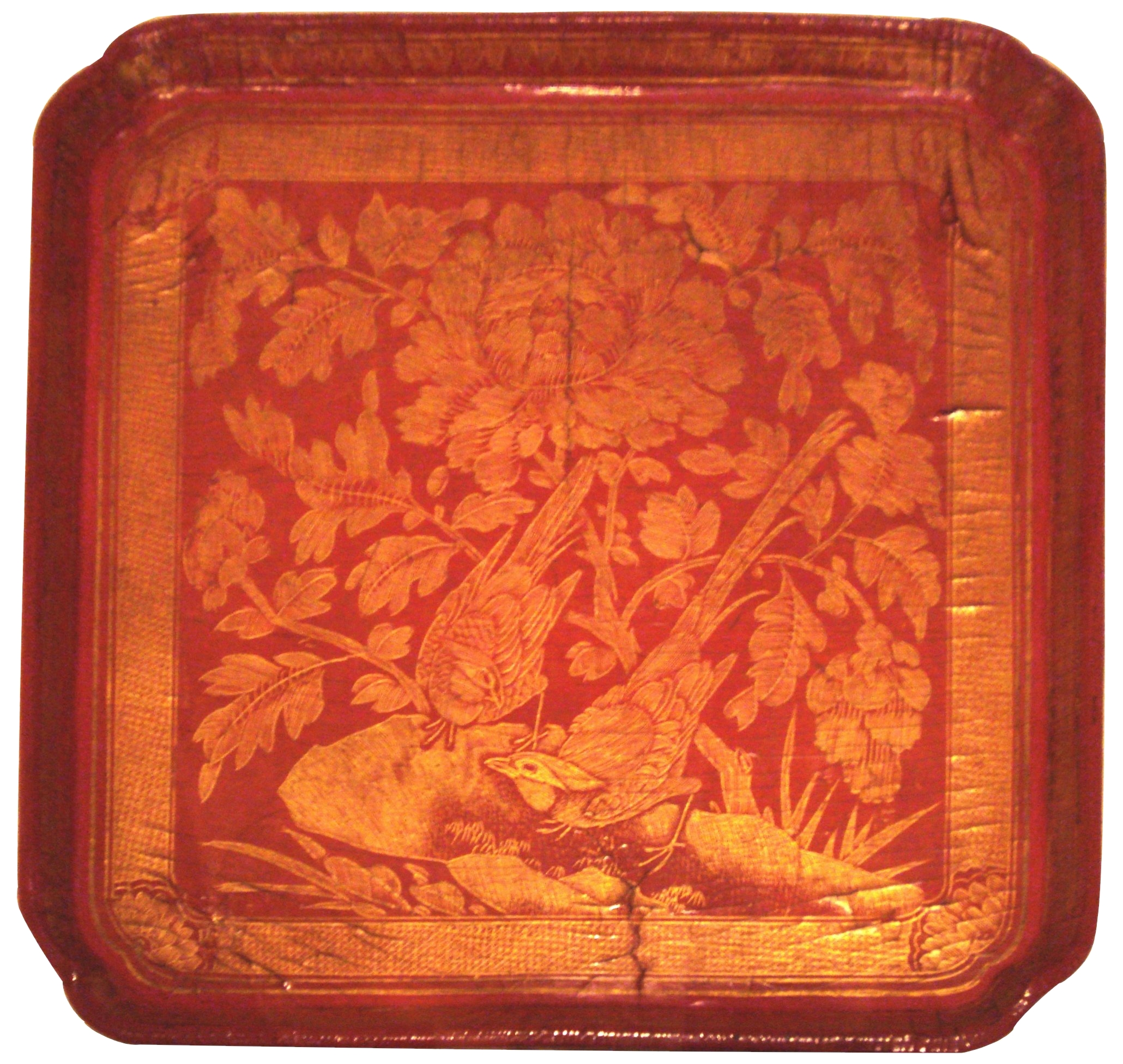
In this gold-engraved lacquerware food tray from the Song dynasty (960–1279), the two long-tailed birds represent longevity, and the peony seen at the top centre represents prosperity.

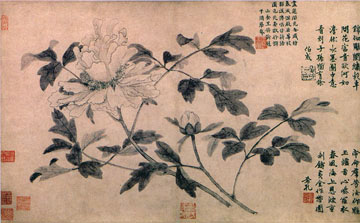
Peony, by Chinese artist Wang Qian, Yuan dynasty (1271–1368)

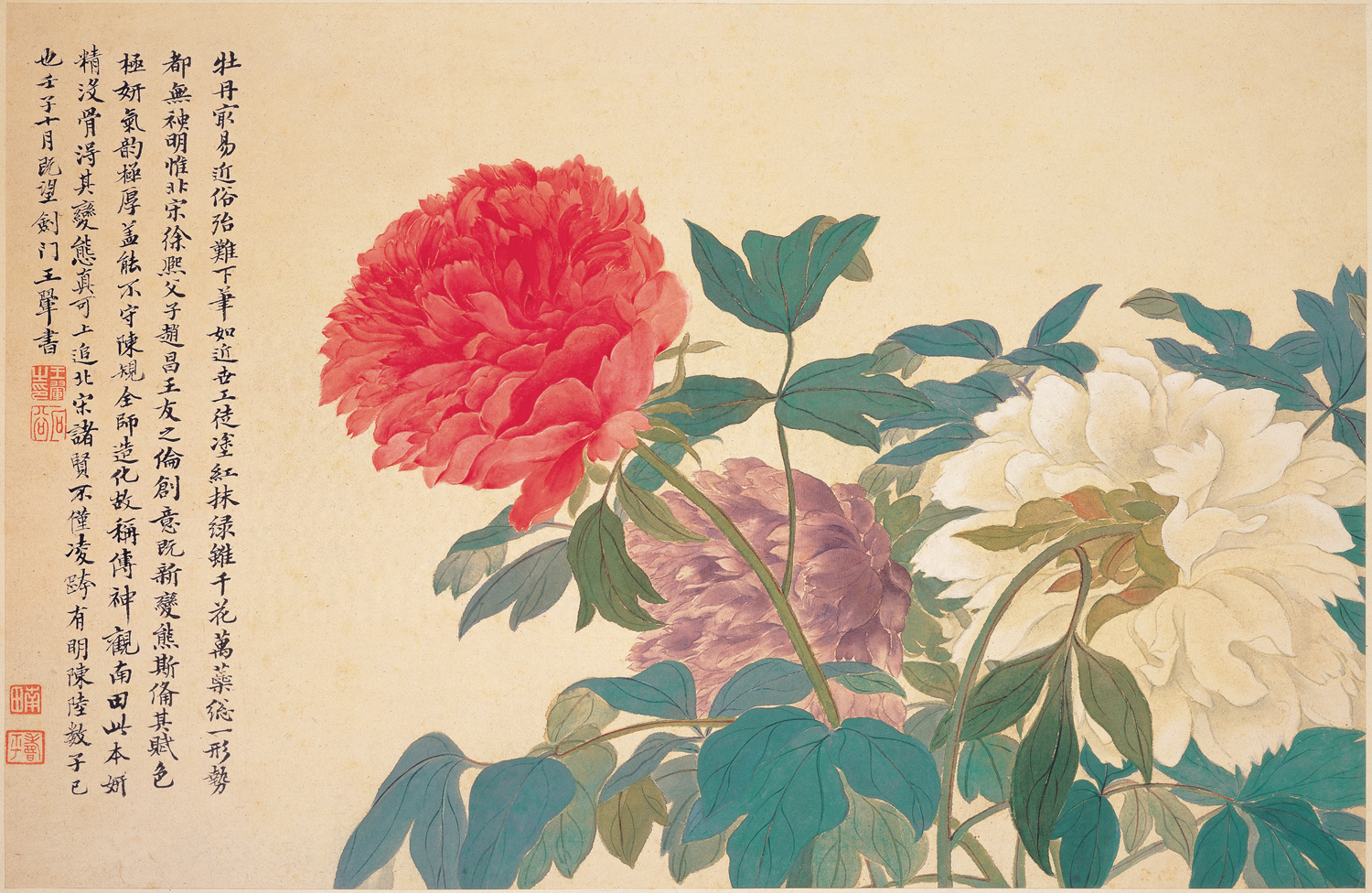
Portrait of a peony by Chinese artist Yun Shouping, 17th century

The peony is among the longest-used flowers in Eastern culture. Along with the plum blossom, it is a traditional floral symbol of China, where the Paeonia suffruticosa is called 牡丹 (mǔdān). It is also known as 富貴花 (fùguìhuā) "flower of riches and honour" or 花王 (huawang) "king of the flowers", and is used symbolically in Chinese art.

In 1903, the Qing dynasty declared the peony as the national flower. Currently, the Republic of China government in Taiwan designates the plum blossom as the national flower, while the People's Republic of China government has no legally designated national flower. In 1994, the peony was proposed as the national flower after a nationwide poll, but the National People's Congress failed to ratify the selection. In 2003, another selection process was initiated, but no choice has been made to date.

The ancient Chinese city Luoyang has a reputation as a cultivation centre for the peonies. Throughout Chinese history, peonies in Luoyang have been said to be the finest in the country. Dozens of peony exhibitions and shows are still held there annually.

The Greek doctor Dioscorides named aglaophotis, a herb supposedly capable of warding off certain evils, as a member of the peony family.

In the Middle Ages, peonies were often painted with their ripe seed-capsules, since it was the seeds, not the flowers, which were medically significant. Ancient superstition dictated that great care be taken not to be seen by a woodpecker while picking the plant's fruit, or the bird might peck out one's eyes.

The red flowers of the species Paeonia peregrina are important in Serbian folklore. Known as Kosovo peonies (Serbian: косовски божур, kosovski božur), they are said to represent the blood of Christian warriors who died in the Battle of Kosovo.

In 1957, the Indiana General Assembly passed a law to make the peony the state flower of Indiana, a title which it holds to this day. It replaced the zinnia, which had been the state flower since 1931.

Mischievous nymphs were said to hide in the petals of the peony, giving it the meaning of Shame or Bashfulness in the Language of Flowers.

Peonies are a common subject in tattoos, often used along with koi-fish. The popular use of peonies in Japanese tattoo was inspired by the ukiyo-e artist Utagawa Kuniyoshi's illustrations of Suikoden, a classical Chinese novel. His paintings of warrior-heroes covered in pictorial tattoos included lions, tigers, dragons, koi fish, and peonies, among other symbols. The peony became a masculine motif, associated with a devil-may-care attitude and disregard for consequence.

Famous painters of peonies have included Conrad Gessner (ca. 1550) and Auguste Renoir in 1879. Paeonia officinalis can be found in the altar picture of Maria im Rosenhag by Schongauer in the former Dominican Church in Colmar. The Italian Jesuit, painter and architect Giuseppe Castiglione (1688–1766), who worked at the court of the Qianlong Emperor in the Qing dynasty, also painted peonies.

== Bibliography ==
- Auer, James D.; Greenberg, Joshua (June 2009). "Peonies: An Economic Background for Alaska Flower Growers" (PDF). SNRAS/AFES Miscellaneous Publication MP 2009-08. School of Natural Resources & Agricultural Resources, University of Alaska, Fairbanks.
