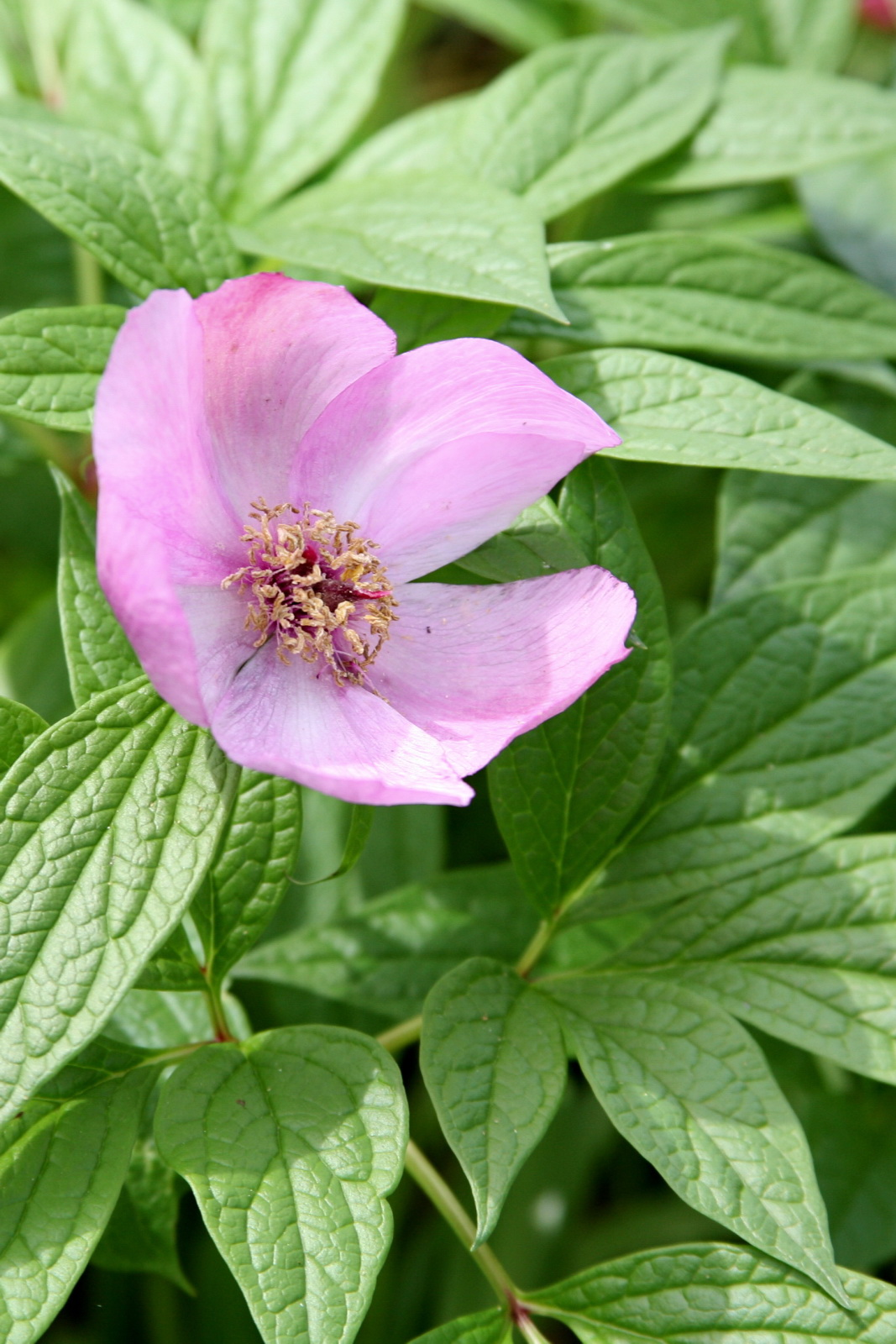

Scientific classification
- Kingdom: Plantae
- Clade: Tracheophytes
- Clade: Angiosperms
- Clade: Eudicots
- Order: Saxifragales
- Family: Paeoniaceae
- Genus: Paeonia
- Species: P. mairei

Binomial name
- Paeonia mairei H.Lév.

Synonyms
- P. bifurcata, P. mairei forma oxypetala, P. oxypetala

= Paeonia mairei =

Species of flowering plant

Paeonia mairei is a species of peony, that is endemic to the mountains of central China. Its vernacular name in China is 美丽芍药 (mei li shao yao) meaning "beautiful peony". The plant may be between 45 and 100 cm high and has mostly rose-pink flowers of about 10 cm across, one on each stem. P. mairei blooms in early spring.

== Description ==
Paeonia mairei is a perennial herbaceous plant of up to 1 m high, that dies down in the autumn, and overwinters with buds just under the surface of the soil. It has thick roots that become thinner towards their tips, while the rootstocks is approximately 2 cm in diameter. Young shoots and leaves are initially red-purple to pink. The stems and leaves are hairless. The largest leaves, near the base of the stem are split into three, which parts themselves are split into leaflets, some of which may be incised, up to nineteen in total, 6—16 1/2 × 1 3/4—7 cm, gradually broadening at their base and usually pointy at their tip. Veins are deeply sunken on the top-side of the leaf. Each stem bears only one flower at its tip of between 7 1/2 and 14 cm wide. Each flower is accompanied by one to three leaflike or linear bracts of up to 9 cm long. Each flower has three to five, green and broadly oval sepals of 1—1 1/2 × 7/8—1 1/4 cm. The seven to nine, inverted egg-shaped, pink to Spanish carmine petals are 3 1/2—7 × 2—4 1/2 cm, with a usually rounded tip. Within the circle of petals is a circle of stamens that consist of purple-red filaments topped by yellow anthers. Within is a low, yellow, ring-shaped disc, that encircles the base of the two or three carpels, which may be sparsely to densely covered in short yellow or golden brown felty hairs, or rarely hairless. Those are topped by styles of up to 4 mm long, that have red stigmas. Each carpel develops into a dry fruit that opens with a suture (or follicle) of 3—3 1/2 × 1—1 1/4 cm. The inside of the fruit is bright red which contrast well with the blue shiny seeds. This peony species in his native range flowers in April and May, and produces seed in August. Paeonia mairei has both diploid and tetraploid populations (2n=10, 4n=20).

== Taxonomy ==
With all Eurasian herbaceous peonies species, Paeonia mairei belongs to the section Paeonia. The taxonomy of this group of peonies is complicated due to reticulate evolution. In the most recent revision of the genus, it is assigned to the subsection Foliatae with P. algeriensis, P. broteri, P. cambessedesii, P. clusii, P. coriacea, P. corsica, P. daurica, P. kesrouanensis, P. mascula and P. obovata.

Paeonia russi is the tetraploid hybrid of diploid P. lactiflora and P. mairei. Paeonia banatica is the tetraploid hybrid of P. mairei and either P. arietina, P. humilis, P. officinalis, P. parnassica or less likely P. tenuifolia, or one of their (now extinct) common ancestors.

=== Etymology ===
Paeonia mairei was named in honor of the French missionary Père Edouard-Ernest Maire who discovered the plant for western science in 1913 in northeastern Yunnan.

== Distribution and ecology ==
Paeonia mairei can be found in deciduous broad-leaved forests on lime, between 1500 and 2700 m altitude, but is reported to have been found as high as 3200 m when discovered by Père Maire. It grows naturally in southeastern Gansu, northwestern Guizhou, southwestern Hubei, southern Shaanxi, central and Southern Sichuan, and northeastern Yunnan.

== Cultivation ==
Paeonia mairei has only recently become available as an ornamental outside of China. It is reported to be the first of the herbaceous peonies to bloom, and recover well from morning frost. It does not take full sun well, but needs enough light.
