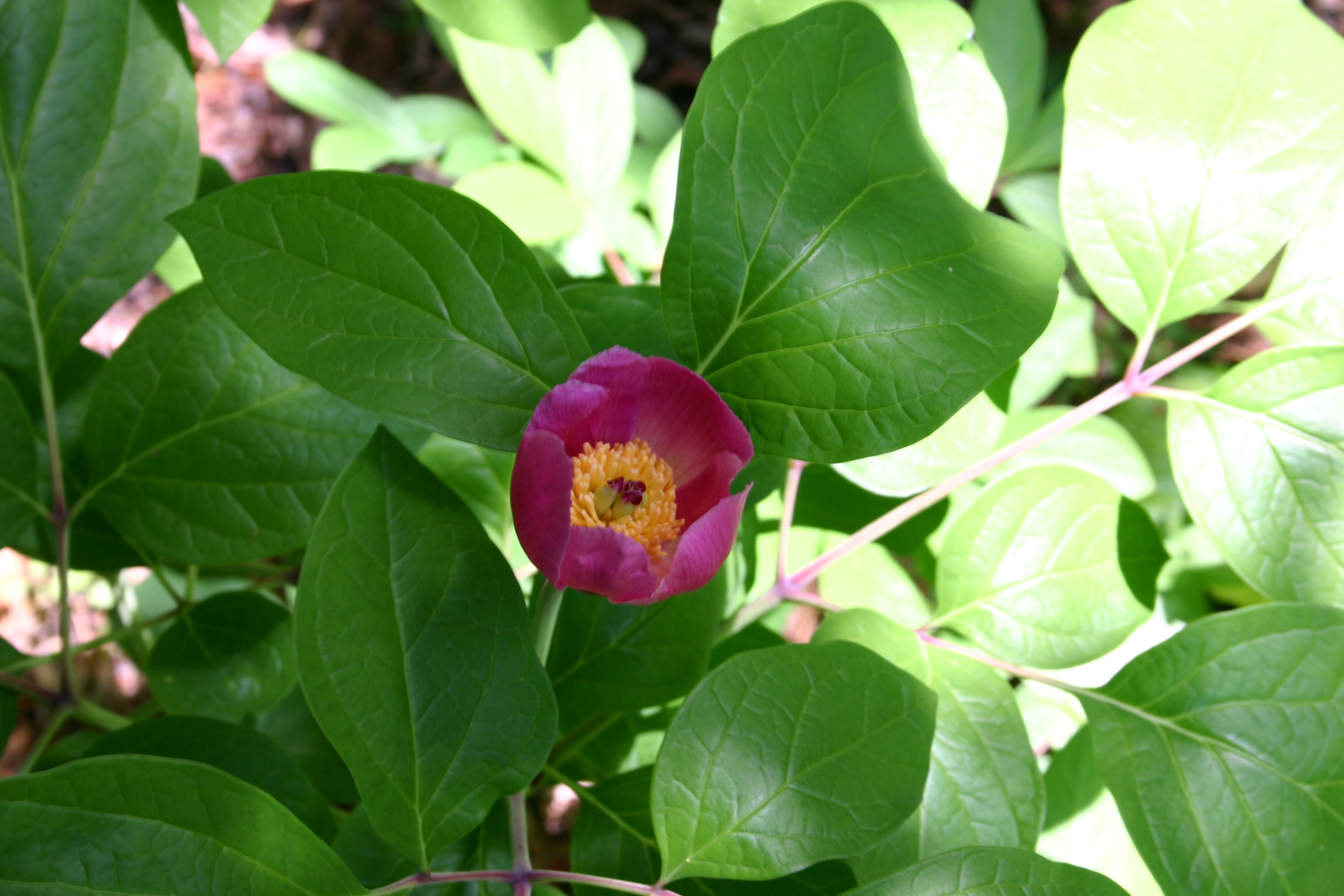

Scientific classification
- Kingdom: Plantae
- Clade: Tracheophytes
- Clade: Angiosperms
- Clade: Eudicots
- Order: Saxifragales
- Family: Paeoniaceae
- Genus: Paeonia
- Species: P. obovata

Binomial name
- Paeonia obovata Maxim.

Subspecies
- P. obovata ssp. obovata = P. obovata var. alba, var. amurensis, var. glabra, var. typica; P. japonica, P. obovata ssp. japonica, var. japonica, P. japonica var. pilosa; P. oreogeton, P. obovata forma oreogeton; P. vernalis; P. obovata ssp. willmottiae, = P. willmottiae, P. obovata var. willmottiae

= Paeonia obovata =

Species of flowering plant

Paeonia obovata is a perennial herbaceous species of peony growing 30–70 cm high. It has white, pink or purple-red flowers and its lower leaves consist of no more than nine leaflets or segments. In English it is sometimes called woodland peony. It grows naturally in warm-temperate to cold China, including Manchuria, and in Korea, Japan, Far Eastern Russia (Primorsky Krai) and on Sakhalin.

== Description ==
Paeonia obovata is a polyploid complex, and shows much morphological variability. It is a perennial herbaceous plant of 30–70 cm high, which dies down in the autumn, and overwinters with buds just under the surface of the soil.

=== Root, stem and leaves ===
This plant has thick roots, that become narrower toward their tips. Its stems are hairless and have five to eight yellowish green to pink scales at its base. The compound pinnate leaves are arranged alternately around stout hairless stems. The blades of the lowest leaves may be in a horizontal plane or ascending, and are split into three. Those parts are themselves split into three leaflets. Each of these up to nine leaflets are inverted egg-shaped, 5—14 × 4–10 cm, with their downward facing surfaces either densely felted, roughly hairy or without hair, while the upward facing surfaces are always hairless. The foot of each leaflet gradually narrows into the leaflet stalk, has an entire margin, and a rounded or pointed tip.

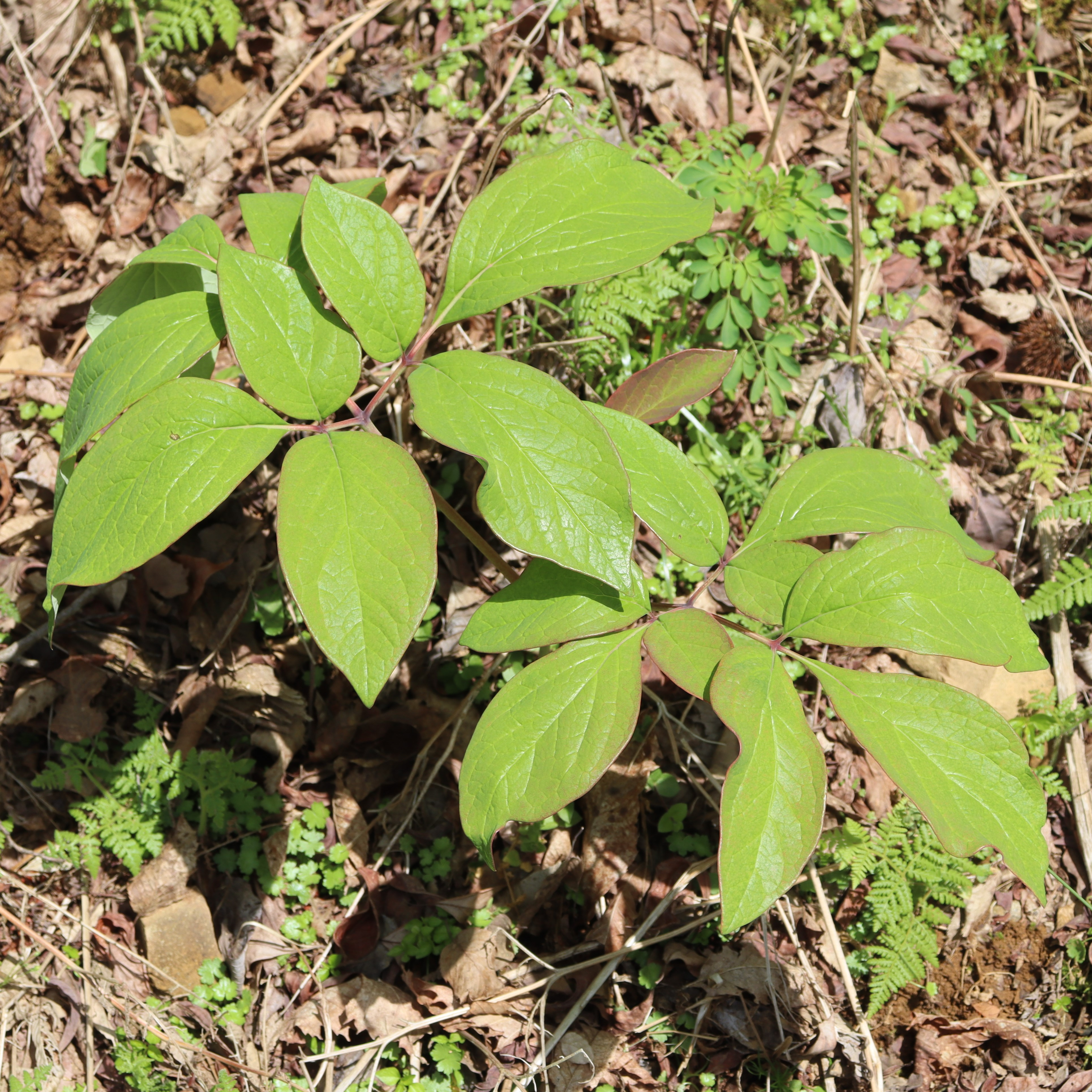

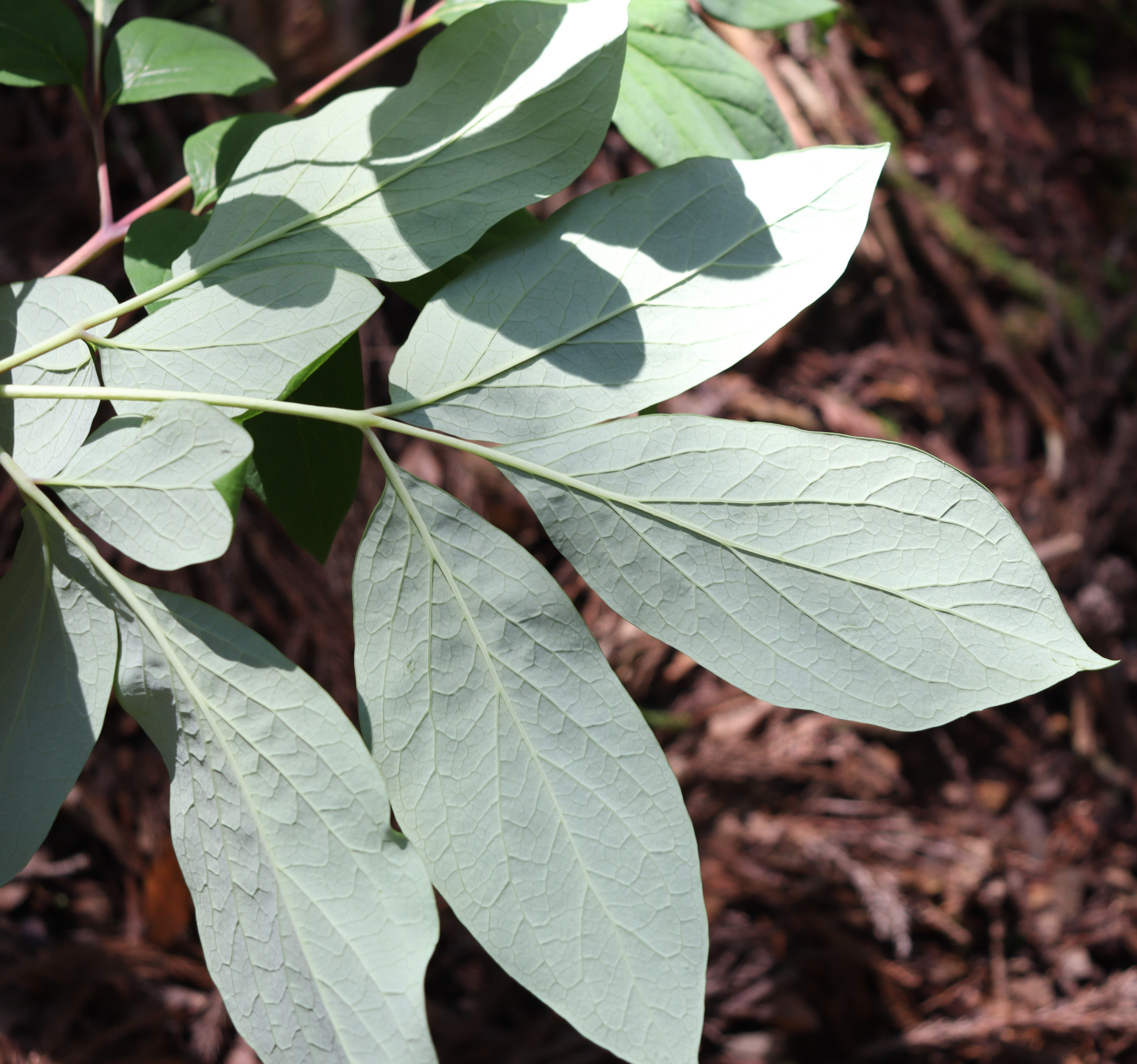

=== Flowers, fruits and seed ===
The inflorescence consists of a single flower at the top of the stem, which is between 7 and 12 cm in diameter. It is subtended by one or two unequal leaflet-like bracts. It has three (occasionally two or four) green, unequal sepals of 1½—3 × 1½—2 cm, mostly rounded. The four to seven inverted egg-shaped petals of 3—5½ × 1¾—2¾ cm may spread out or remain more curved in, and vary in color between white, rose, pink-red, carmine, purple-red, or sometimes white with a pinkish base or margin. The filaments are white, green-yellow, or purple near their base and white near the anther, or may be entirely purple. The anthers themselves are yellow, orange-red, or dark purple. Within the ring of stamens is a low, yellow, ring-shaped disc, that encircles the base of the two or three (rarely one, four or five) carpels, which are hairless and consists of a green ovary topped by a carmine-colored stigma. These develop into a dry fruit that opens with one suture (a so-called follicle), that is gradually recurved, ellipsoid in shape and 2–3 cm long. They contain glossy black seeds. Flowers open in May and June, while ripe seed is available in September.

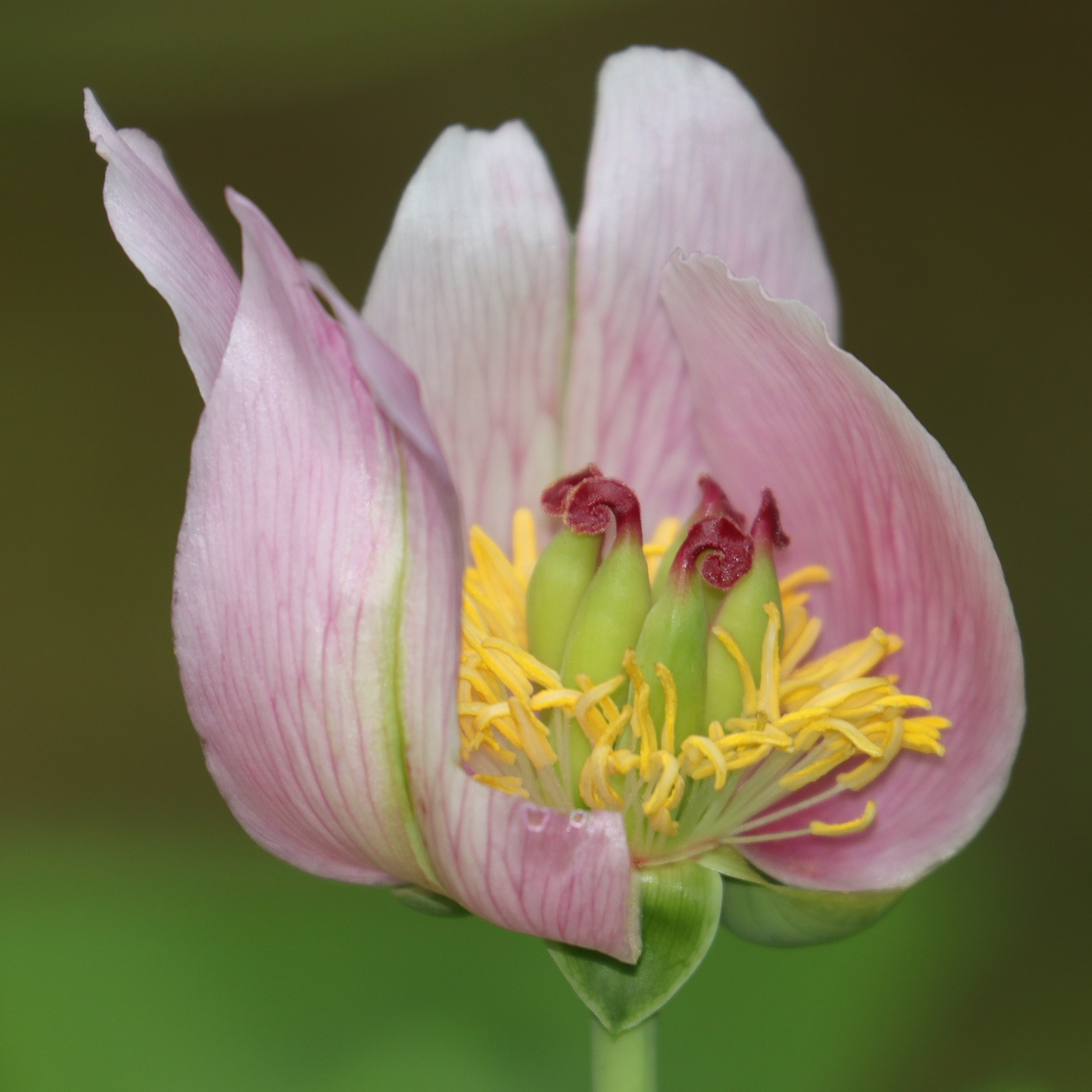
flower

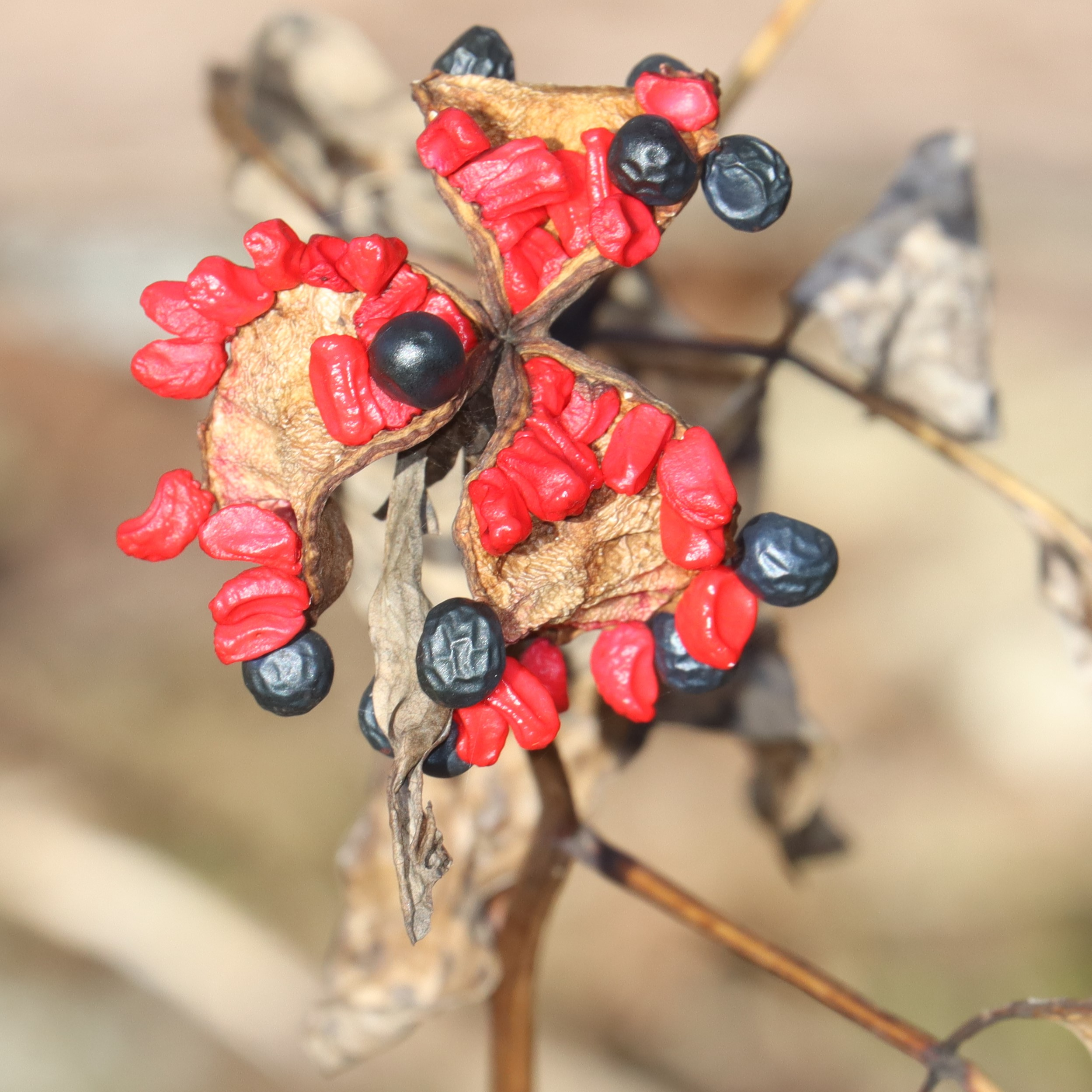
seeds

=== Genome ===
The base number of different chromosomes in all peonies is five. Both diploid (2n=10) and tetraploid (4n=20) populations of P. obovata are known.

=== Variability ===
Paeonia obovata is a variable species for a number of different characters. Leaf blades may be horizontal or ascending, the underside of the leaf may be felty or roughly haired or hairless, petals may have an array of different colors, as may the filaments and the anthers. The number of stamens varies between 20 and 240, and the number of carpels between 1 and 5. Plants may be diploid or tetraploid. These character states occur in many different combinations, although some occur more frequent than others, such as red flowers having 20 to 110 stamens and white flowers between 60 and 240. One of those combinations with 20 chromosomes is now recognised as the subspecies willmottiae, occurring in the Qin Mountains, is characterised by a hairy underside of the leaf blade. However, tetraploids occur also elsewhere, and those do not necessarily have downward facing hairy leaf blade surfaces, while hairy under surfaces also occur in diploids.

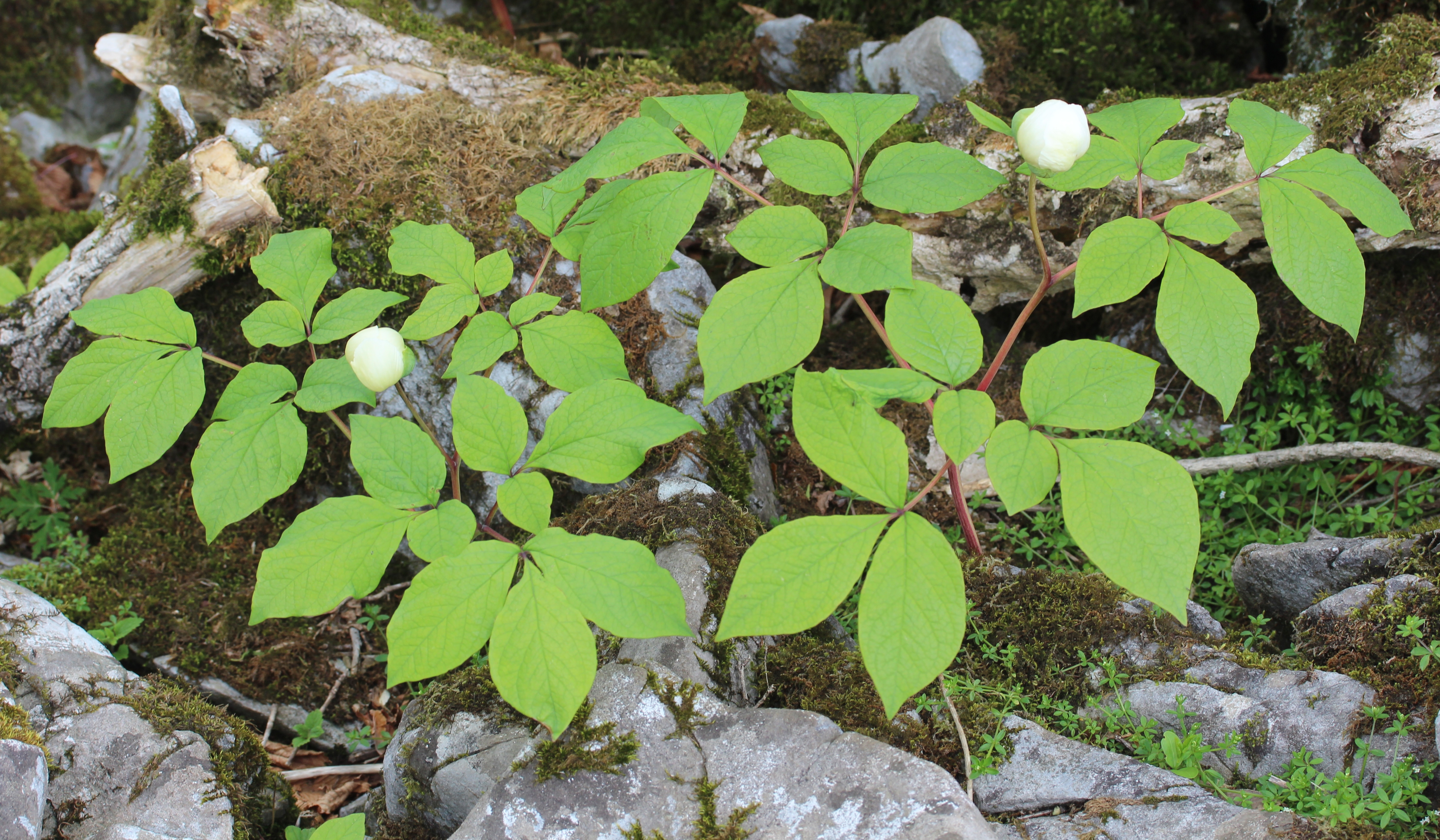
habit with buds

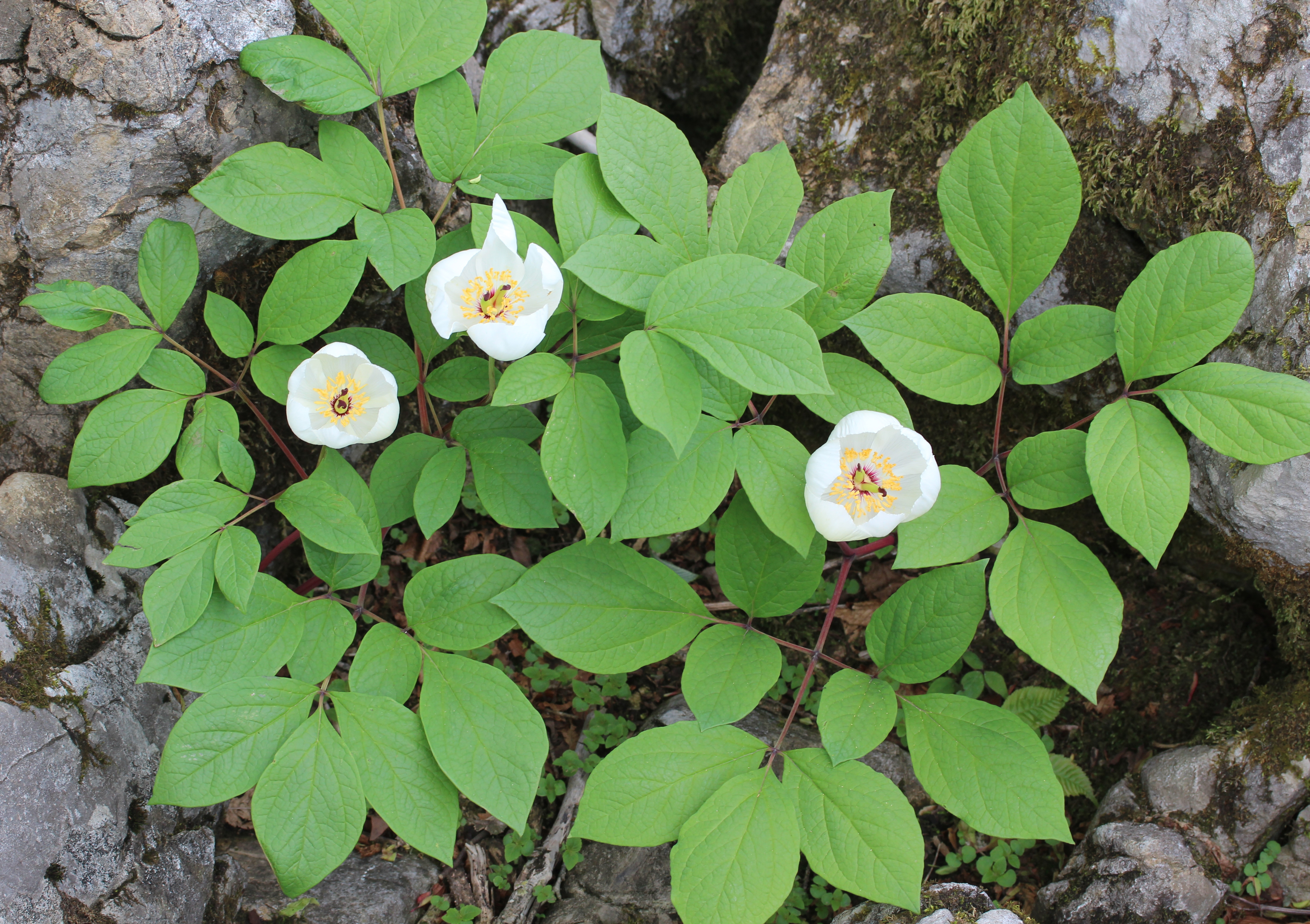
habit with flowers

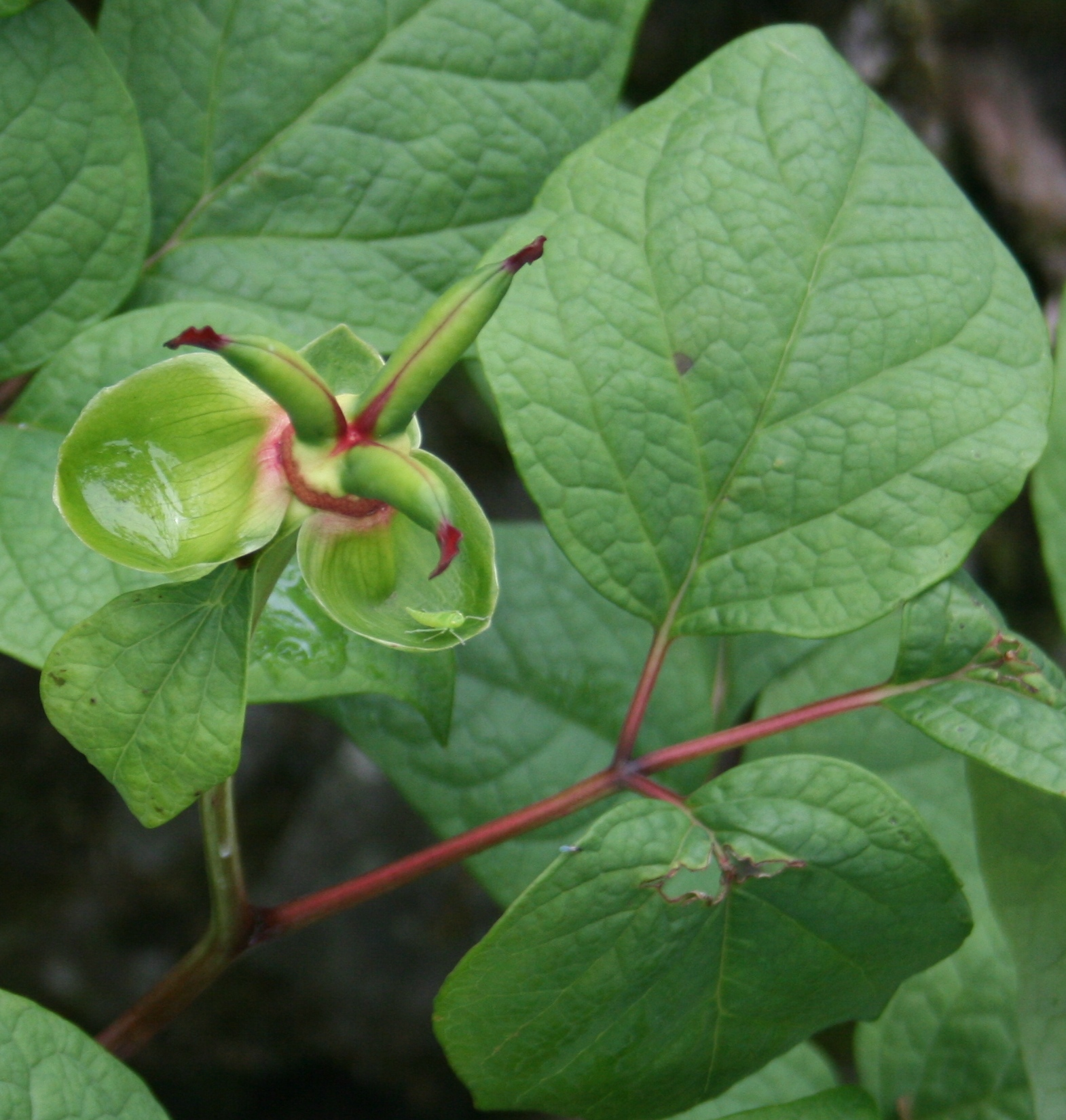
fruit

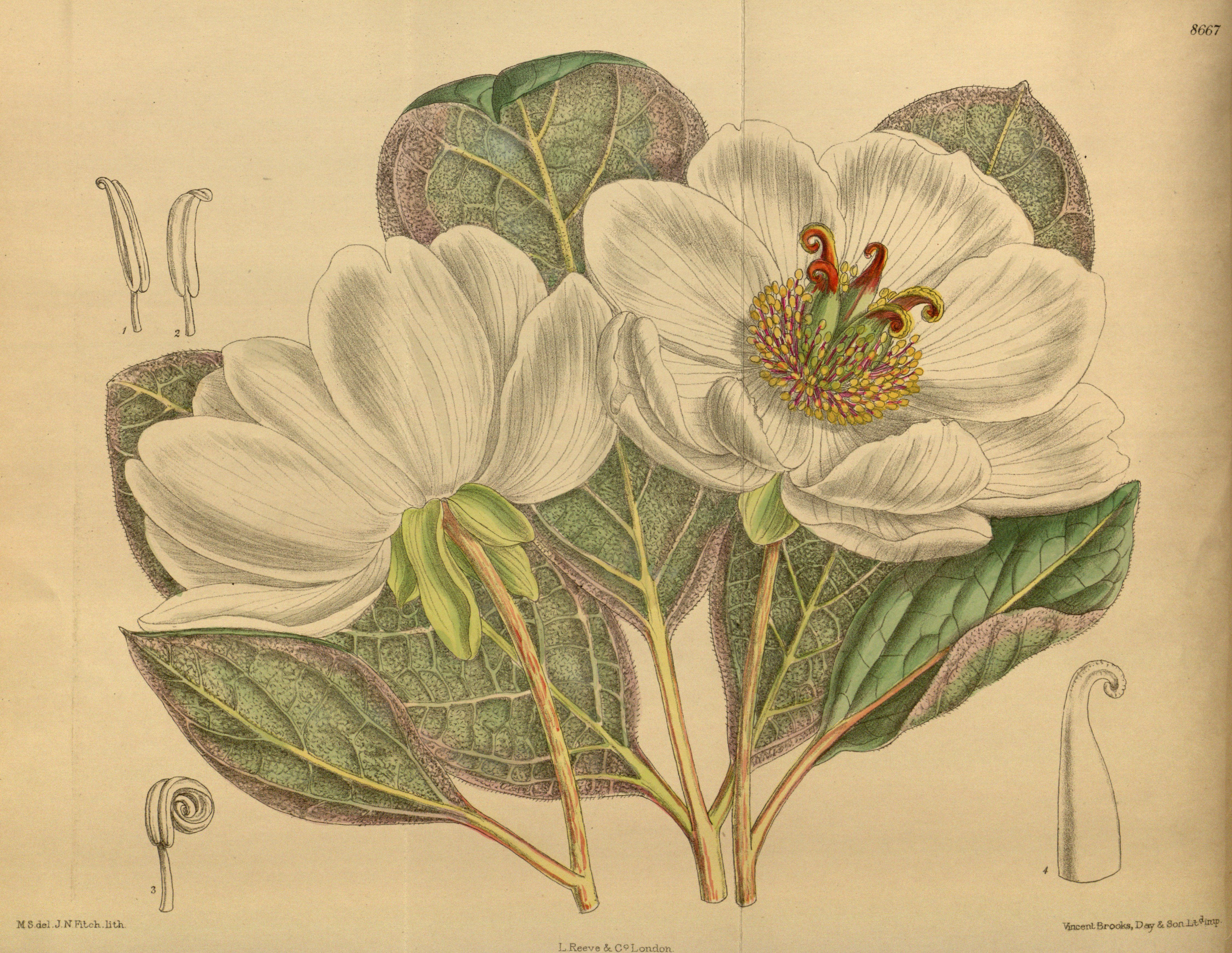
subspecies willmottiae

== Taxonomy ==
=== History of taxonomy ===
Karl Maximovich in 1859 was the first to describe this species, based on a specimen collected in the Amur Oblast, and it had rose-purple flowers. In 1879, Spencer Le Marchant Moore created P. oreogeton, and his type came from Kuandian. A variety with white petals was discovered on Honshu by Tomitaro Makino and named P. obovata var. japonica in 1898, but Hisayoshi Takeda thought it in 1910 deserving to be recognised as its own species, P. japonica. Otto Stapf described P. willmottiae in 1916 based on a specimen from the garden of Miss Willmott, that was raised from seed that had been collected by Ernest Henry Wilson in China. P. vernalis, from Far East Russia (Nikolsk-Ussuria), was described by Karl Mandle in 1921. Nikolai Schipczinsky thought only four species to be present in Russia: P. obovata, P. japonica, P. oreogeton and P. vernalis. F.C. Stern revised this group of names in 1946, and suggested to merge P. oreogeton and P. vernalis with P. obovata, and to reduce P. willmottiae to a variety, but retained P. japonica. Wen-Pei Fang in 1958 disagreed and thought P. willmottiae needed to be retained as a species. Nearly all Japanese authors, such as Jisaburo Ohwi in 1978, thought there were two species in Japan, each with two subtaxa: P. obovata var. obovata and var. glabra, and P. japonica var. japonica and var. pilosa. More recently however, Chinese botanists regarded all these types as belonging to the same species (or conspecific).

=== Modern classification ===
Although P. obovata has a large morphological variability, and appears both as diploid and tetraploid, these characters appear in any combination, although some character combinations are much more common than others. Nonetheless, since tetraploidy and hairy undersides of the leaves are combined very frequently and this combination occurs in a specific area, it is recognised as the subspecies willmottiae, and all other names are regarded as synonyms. With all Eurasian herbaceous peonies species, Paeonia obovata belongs to the section Paeonia. The taxonomy of this group of peonies is complicated due to reticulate evolution. In the most recent revision of the genus, P. obovata is assigned to the subsection Foliatae with P. algeriensis, P. broteri, P. cambessedesii, P. clusii, P. coriacea, P. corsica, P. daurica, P. kesrouanensis, P. mairei and P. mascula. P. broteri, P. coriacea, P. cambedessedesii, P. clusii, P. rhodia, P. daurica ssp. mlokosewitschi, P. mascula ssp. hellenica and ssp. mascula, and P. wittmanniana are all hybrids of P. lactiflora and P. obovata.

=== Etymology ===
The epithet obovata consists of the Latin ovatus, meaning "egg-shaped" or "oval", and ob meaning "opposite" or "against". Together it means "inverted egg-shaped" and refers to the shape of a leaflet. The subspecies willmottiae is named after the location for its type specimen, Miss Ellen Willmott's garden at Warley Place in Essex, Great-Britain.

== Distribution and ecology ==
The typical subspecies of P. obovata grows in forests ranging from deciduous broad-leaved to coniferous forests and may be found at an altitude of 200–2800 m. In China it occurs naturally in Anhui, southeastern Gansu, northern Guizhou, Hebei, Heilongjiang, southeastern and western Henan, western Hubei, northwestern Hunan, northern Jiangxi, eastern Jilin, Liaoning, southeastern Inner Mongolia, southern Ningxia, eastern Qinghai, southern Shaanxi, Shanxi, Sichuan and northwestern Zhejiang. It also grows in Korea, Far East Russia (Amur Oblast, Primorsky Krai, Sakhalin, Shikotan) and Japan (Hokkaido, Honshu, Shikoku and Kyushu). The ssp. willmottiae is confined to deciduous forests at altitudes between 800 and 2800 m in the neighborhood of the Qinling Range in China.

== Uses ==
The roots of P. obovata (along with P. lactiflora) are used in traditional Chinese medicine as a painkiller, tranquilliser and anti-inflammatory drug, and as a cure against cardiovascular disease and bleeding. It contains specific monoterpene glucosides. The indigenous Ainu people of Hokkaido used this plant, called horap or orap, as a painkiller.

The plant hunter Ernest Henry Wilson introduced Paeonia obovata in Europe in 1900 and it has since been cultivated, initially in botanical gardens, but lately it has become available for gardeners.
