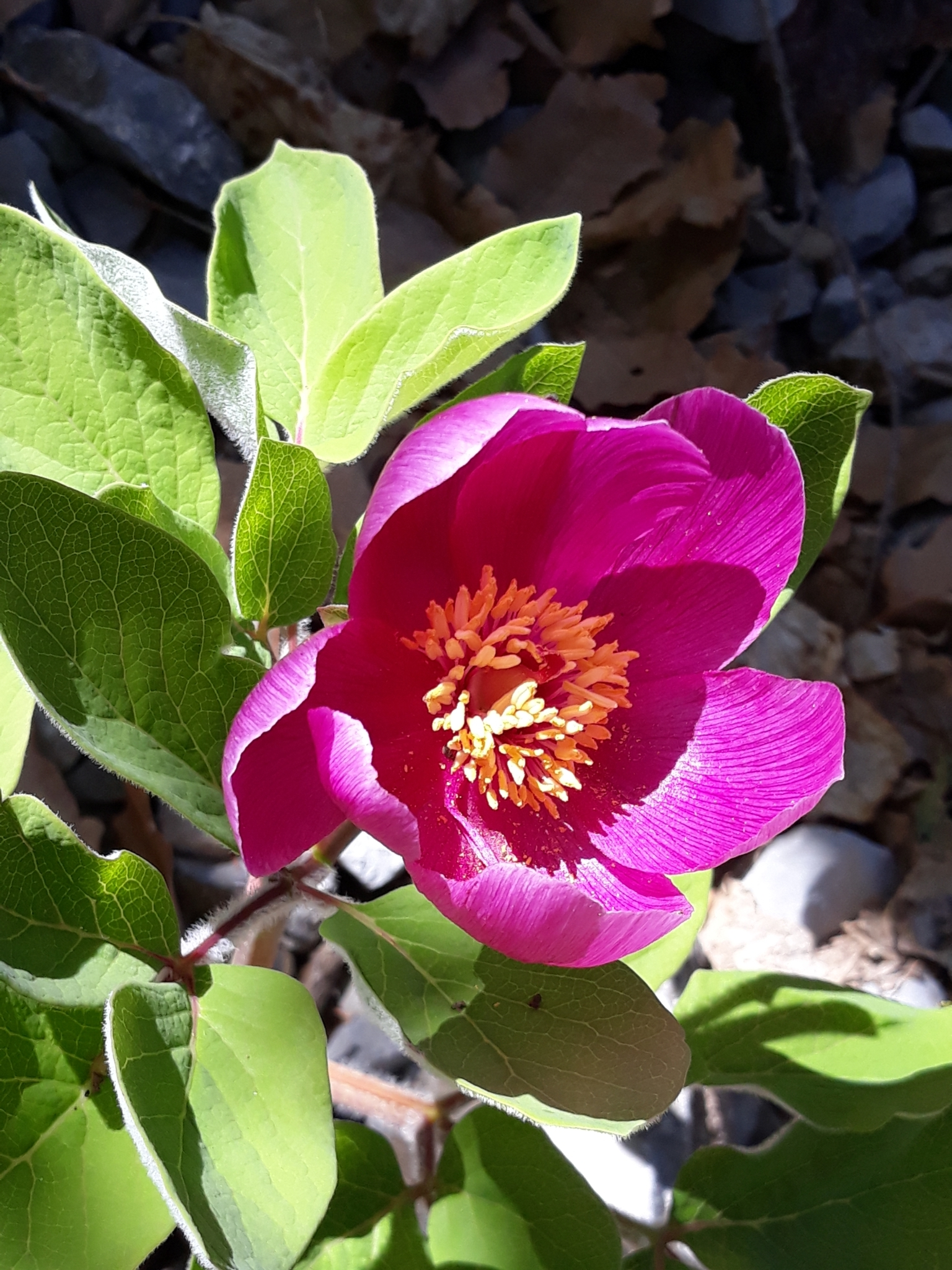

Scientific classification
- Kingdom: Plantae
- Clade: Tracheophytes
- Clade: Angiosperms
- Clade: Eudicots
- Order: Saxifragales
- Family: Paeoniaceae
- Genus: Paeonia
- Species: P. algeriensis

Binomial name
- Paeonia algeriensis Chabert

Synonyms
- P. atlantica; P. corallina subsp. atlantica, var. atlantica; P. coriacea var. atlantica; P. mascula var. atlantica

= Paeonia algeriensis =

Species of plant

Paeonia algeriensis, also known as the Algerian peony, is a herbaceous species of peony that naturally occurs in the coastal mountain range of Algeria (Kabylie). It has solitary flowers with pink to magenta petals and one or two carpels per flower, that develop into follicles of about 5 cm long.

== Description ==
Paeonia algeriensis is a perennial herbaceous plant of more than ½ m (1.65 ft) high.

=== Stem and leaves ===
Stems are 7–10 mm (0.28–0.39 in) in diameter. The leaves near the base of the stem consist of three sets of three leaflets, some of which are deeply incised, resulting in ten to thirteen leaflets and leaflet segments. These are oval in shape, with a round or slightly wedge-shaped foot, an entire margin and a pointed tip, 9–18 cm (3.5–7.1 in) long and 5½-8½ cm (2.17–3.35 in) wide. The leaflet stalks and the underside of the leaflets are always softly hairy, sometimes so dense as to giving it a whitish appearance.

=== Flower, fruit and seed ===
Each stem only carries one flower at the tip. Each flower may be subtended by one leaflet-like bract, but this may also be absent. There are three or four hairless, roundish, 2½–3 × 2-2½ cm (0.98–1.18 × 0.79–0.98 in) sepals which are all rounded at their tip, tinged purple inside and around the margin. The pink to cyclamen-colored inverted egg-shaped petals are 5–6 cm (2.0–2.4 in) long and 3–4 cm (1.2–1.6 in) wide and are rounded at their tip. Like in all peonies there are many stamens. A very short, about 1 mm (0.039 in) and slightly wavy disk surrounds the base of one or two carpels, which are hairless or have few scattered hairs. They are topped by a 1–3 mm (0.039–0.118 in) long style that end in red stigmas. The carpels develop into column-like follicles of 4-5½ cm (1.57–2.17 in) long, that contain oval, 7×9 mm (0.28×0.35 in), black seeds.

=== Differences with related species ===
Paeonia algeriensis has one or two large, almost always entirely hairless carpels of about 5 cm (2.0 in) long when ripe, and the ten to thirteen leaflet segments are covered in felty hair underneath and each 9–18 cm (3.5–7.1 in) long and 5½–9½ cm (2.17–3.74 in) wide. The combination of these characters is unique. Statistically, carpel size and number, and leaflet size are also in their own right can be used to distinguish this species. Paeonia mascula, which occurs over a large area in areas bordering the Mediterranean in Asia and Europe, most often has three or four smaller felty carpels, although some flowers only have one or two and others as much as five, and leaflet are smaller and usually bold underneath. Paeonia coriacea from southern Spain and Morocco has leaflets hairless or sparsely haired undersides and each 5–15 cm (2.0–5.9 in) long and 2–8 cm (0.79–3.15 in) wide, mostly two and sometimes one carpel per flower, which develop into follicles of 3½–4¾ cm (1.38–1.77 in). Paeonia corsica, from Corsica, Sardina and western Greece mostly has only nine, smaller leaflets of 4–13 cm (1.6–5.1 in) long and 2–8 cm (0.79–3.15 in) wide, and three to five (occasionally two) usually softly haired carpels, which develop into follicles.

== Taxonomy ==
In 1887, Ernest Cosson described a peony from Mount Babor in Algeria as P. corallina var. atlantica. The following year, Jules Aimé Battandier considered the Algerian peony belongs to P. russoi var coriacea. Louis Charles Trabut in 1889 named another specimen from Mount Babor P. algeriensis, the description of which was later that year published by Alfred Chabert. Frederick Claude Stern assigned Cosson's variety to P. coriacea in 1943. It was elevated to P. corallina subsp. atlantica in part XI of René Maire's Flore de l'Afrique du Nord, published posthumously in 1964. Werner Greuter and Hervé Maurice Burdet however thought Cosson's specimen should be assigned as a subspecies to P. mascula. In 2010, De-Yuan Hong argues that the peonies from the Kabylie Range are distinct from other peonies, and restores P. algeriensis.

== Distribution and ecology ==
Paeonia algeriensis is an endemic species of Algeria, that is limited to the coastal range known as Kabylie, in particular the parts called Djurdjura, Magris and Babor Mountains, and grows in forests dominated by oak and cedar.
