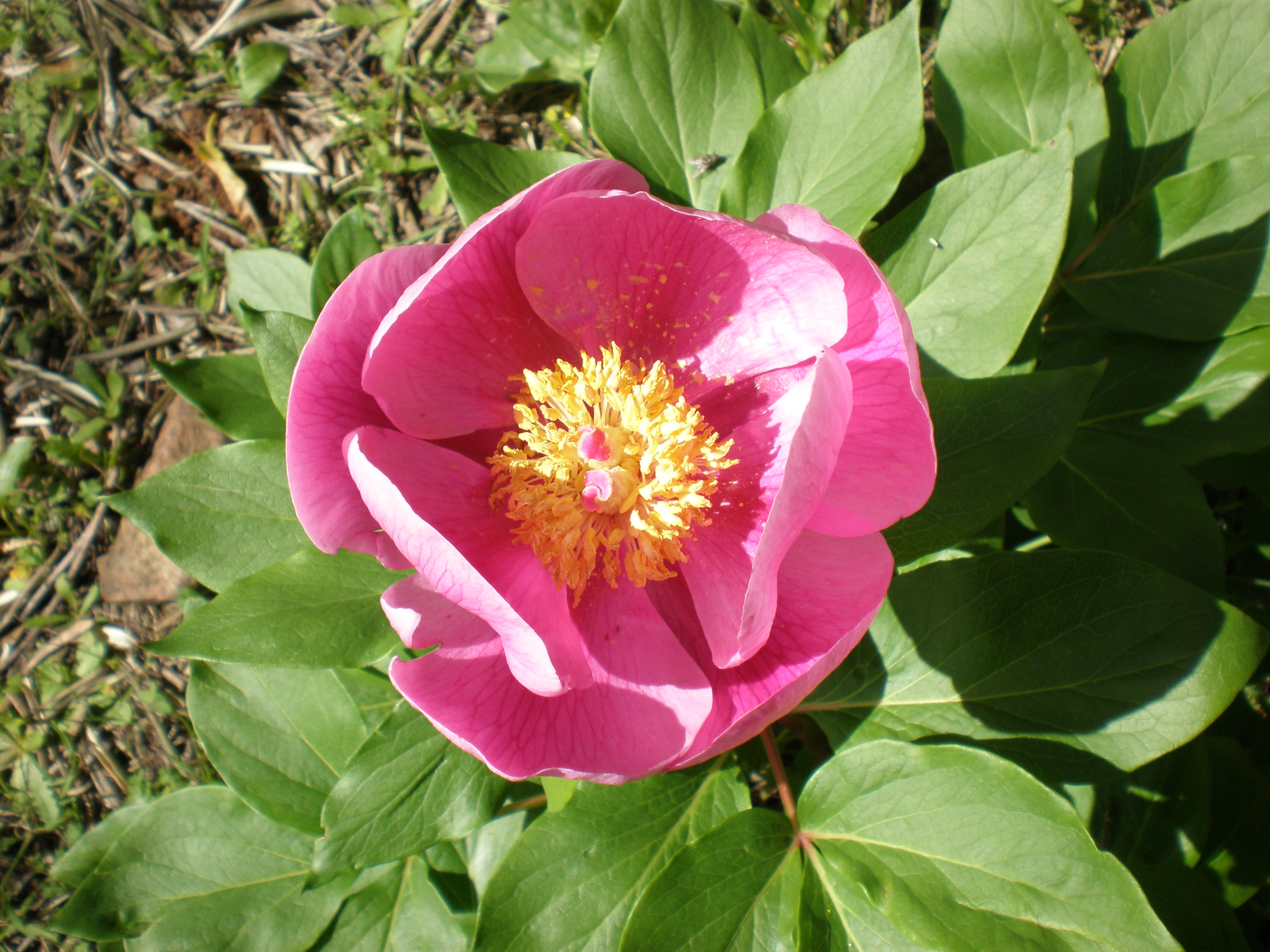

Scientific classification
- Kingdom: Plantae
- Clade: Embryophytes
- Clade: Tracheophytes
- Clade: Spermatophytes
- Clade: Angiosperms
- Clade: Eudicots
- Order: Saxifragales
- Family: Paeoniaceae
- Genus: Paeonia
- Species: P. broteri

Binomial name
- Paeonia broteri Boiss. & Reut.

Synonyms
- P. broteri var. ovalifolia; P. corallina var. broteri, f. ovalifolia; P. lobata; P. lusitanica, var. ovalifolia; P. mascula var. broteri, var. lusitanica, var. ovalifolia, f. ovalifolia; P. officinalis var. lusitanica; the name is often misspelled as P. broteroi

= Paeonia broteri =

Species of flowering plant

Paeonia broteri is a perennial, herbaceous species of peony. It is an endemic species of the Iberian Peninsula. It bears rose-pink highly fragrant flowers about 12 cm wide and glossy green leaves. It reaches up to 40 centimetres (16 in) in height.

== Description ==
Paeonia broteri is a perennial, herbaceous plant of 30–80 cm (12–31 in) in height. It is a diploid species with ten chromosomes (2n=10).

=== Roots, stems and leaves ===
It has carrot-shaped roots up to 3 cm thick, from which the plant regrows early in spring, when conditions are best for plant growth in its home range. It also has thin lateral roots. Its stems are often tinged purple. Its leaves consist of three sets of mostly three leaflets, which may be deeply incised themselves, resulting in ten to thirty oval or longish oval segments (1½-5 or rarely up to 6½ cm wide), with a wedge-shaped foot, a more or less pointy tip, shiny bright green upper surface, and a (nearly) hairless, distinctly blue-green underside.

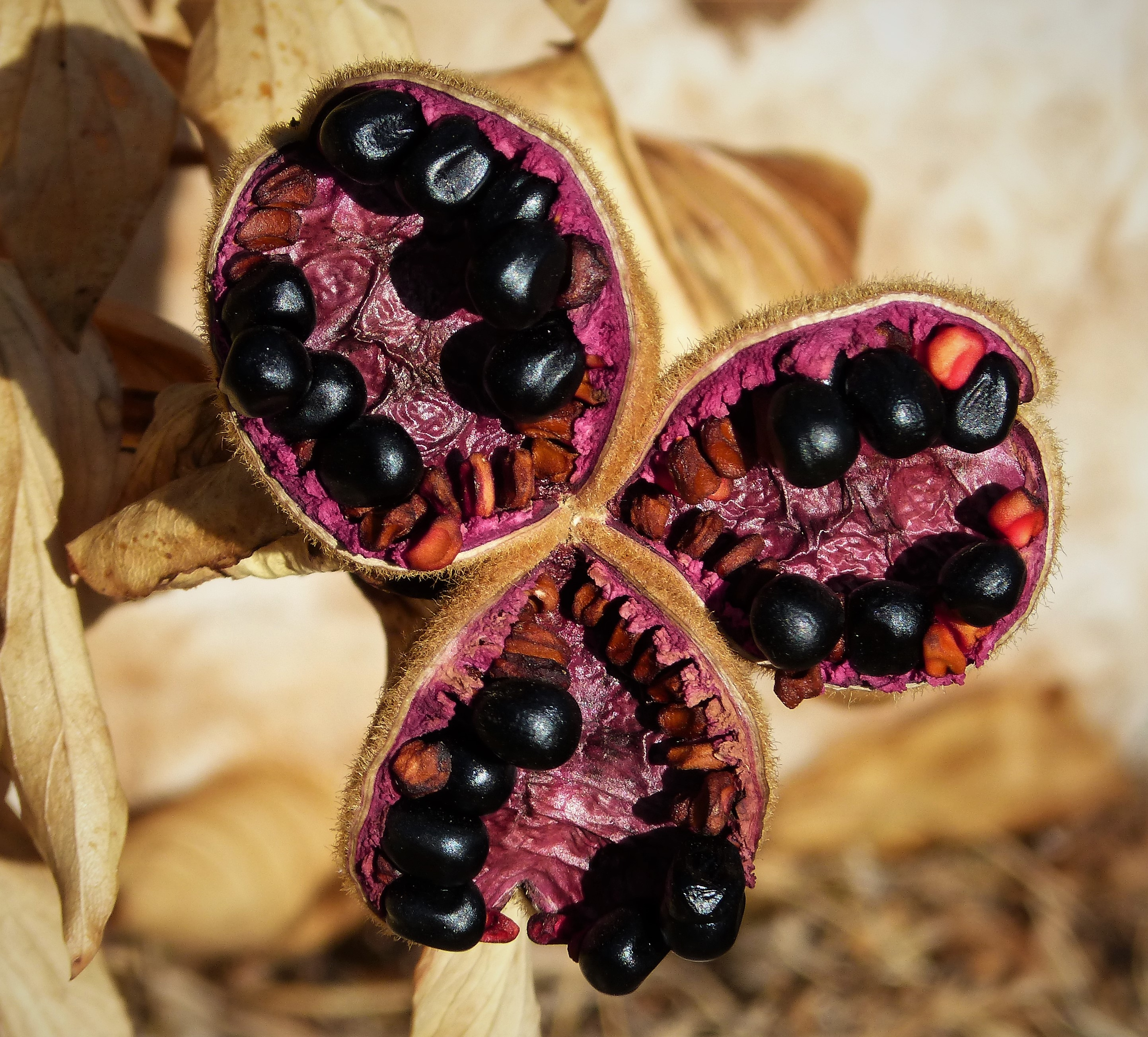
Paeonia seeds

=== Flowers, fruits and seeds ===
The flowers are set individually at the top of the stems, are mostly subtended by one or two bracts looking like a leaf segment, and may be up to 15–16 cm (5.9–6.3 in) in diameter. It has three, sometimes four, sepals, green with a purple margin, of approximately 3 cm long and 2½ cm wide, with rounded tips. There are five or six magenta or pinkish magenta petals, each 5–6 cm long and 3–4 cm wide. Numerous stamens consist of cream-colored, yellowish or purple filaments topped with yellow anthers. There are mostly two or three (occasionally one or four, rarely five) carpels covered in 2 mm long rust-colored hairs, with at their tips very short red stigmas of 2½ mm wide, their base encircled by a 2 mm high disk. The fruit consists of two to three (seldom one or four) follicles, each of which is up to 2½-4 cm high, and is covered in dense felty hairs which persist when fully grown. In its home range, this species has flowers from late March to May, but in The Netherlands flowering occurs in June and early July. The seeds are about 7–8 mm in size, reddish at first but blackish when ripe.

=== Differences with related species ===
Paeonia broteri is closely related to Paeonia clusii and shares the same characters except for the different average numbers of leaflet segments: 11–32 in P. broteri, 23–48 in P. clusii subsp. rhodia and 23–96 in P. clusii subsp. clusii. P. broteri also looks like the sympatric P. coriacea, but this species can be distinguished by its hairless carpels and wider leaflet segments (2–8 cm). P. mascula may also be confused with P. broteri, but this has only ten to eighteen (seldom up to twenty one) and larger (4½–18 × 3–9 cm) leaflet segments, while its carpels are mostly hairless and if present the hairs are about 2 mm long, whereas the densely hairy carpels of P. broteri carry hairs about 3 mm long. The distinctiveness of P. coriacea and P. mascula from P. broteri is confirmed by their tetraploidy (2n=20), while P. broteri is a diploid.

== Etymology ==
The species was named in honor of the Portuguese botanist Félix Avelar Brotero.

== Distribution and habitat ==
Paeonia broteri naturally occurs mostly in the western part of the Iberian Peninsula (most of Portugal and western Spain) except the humid Northwest (north-western Portugal and Green Spain). Two specimens claimed to be from northern Morocco are probably from Spain. Despite its wide range, it is very dispersed through shrubs, oak or pine forests, in limestone soils from 300 to 1,830 m (980 to 6,000 ft) in altitude.

== Ecology ==
In the wild, P. broteri flowers between April and early June. Seeds become ripe in August or September. It grows in meadows, pastures and in the undergrowth of schrubs, pine and oak forests on well-matured soils on limestone, at an altitude between 300 and 1,830 m (980 and 6,000 ft). It is also common in rocky places and screes, particularly in humid spots. It grows together with Adonis vernalis, Cytisus reverchonii, Quercus rotundifolia, Pinus nigra, Pinus pinaster, and Polygonatum odoratum. Plants that grow in different regions vary in the number of flowers per plant, in petal size, the number of stamens per flower, and the number of ovules in each carpel. These differences are related to the dominant pollinators, such as honey bees and bumble bees (Bombus terrestris) in the Sierra de Cazorla and smaller halictid bees in the Sierra de Jaén.
