= Édouard-Ernest Maire =

Monseigneur Édouard Maire
- Pro-Vicar Apostolic of Lower Yunnan
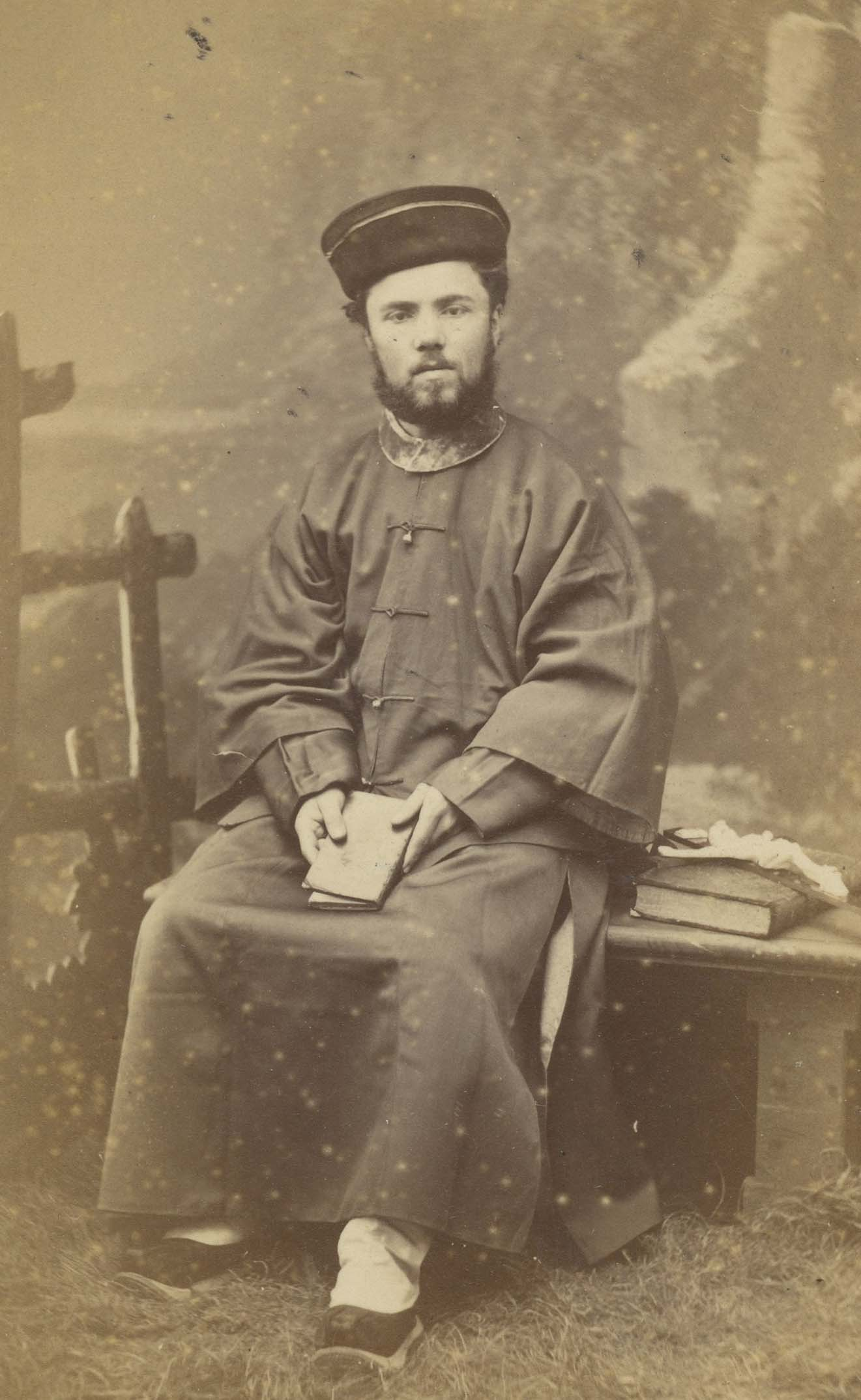
- Installed: 15 February 1890

Orders
- Ordination: 21 September 1872

Personal details
- Born: February 28, 1848 Trondes, France
- Died: October 19, 1932 Dongchuan, Yunnan, China

Édouard Ferdinand Ernest Maire (28 February 1848 – 19 August 1932) was a French missionary and plant collector in China. He served as Pro-Vicar Apostolic of Yunnan. Between 1905 and 1916 he sent the plant material he collected to various herbaria in Europe. From time to time he also collected seeds. He collected most actively on the plateaus surrounding his seat in Kunming, but he sometimes made trips to the more than 3000 m high limestone mountains near Dongchuan to the North-East. His collections were described by, among others, Léveillé and Franchet in Paris.

Several plants were named in honor of Édouard-Ernest Maire including Epipactis mairei, Fargesia mairei, Nomocharis mairei, Paeonia mairei, Primula mairei and Sedum mairei.

Specimens collected by Maire are housed in multiple herbaria, including at the National Herbarium of Victoria (MEL), Royal Botanic Gardens Victoria.
