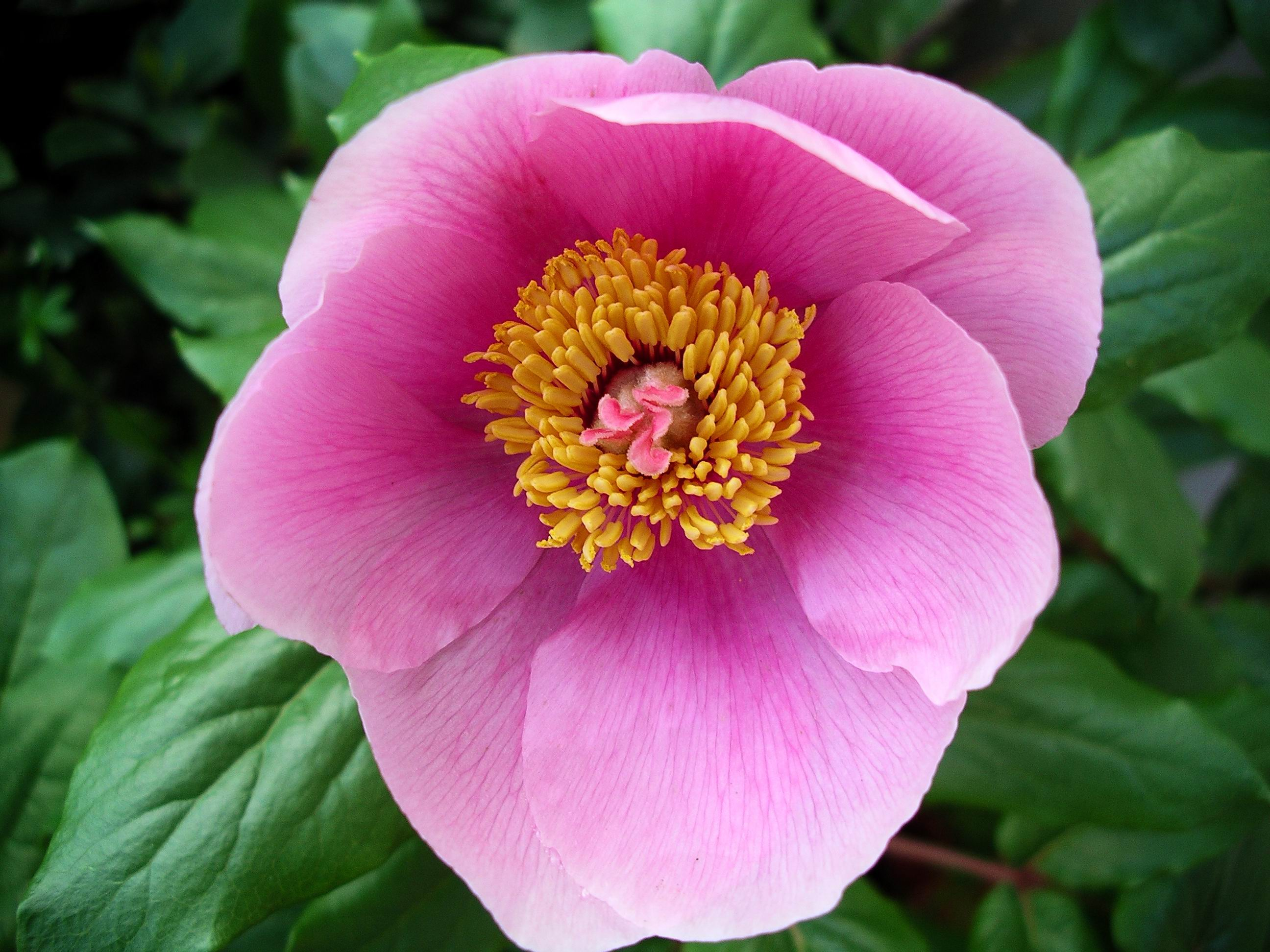
- (from Sardinia)

Scientific classification
- Kingdom: Plantae
- Clade: Tracheophytes
- Clade: Angiosperms
- Clade: Eudicots
- Order: Saxifragales
- Family: Paeoniaceae
- Genus: Paeonia
- Species: P. corsica

Binomial name
- Paeonia corsica (Sieber) ex. Tausch

Synonyms
- P. corallina var. corsica, f. corsica, - f. ovalifolia, and - f. triternata, var. leiocarpa, var. pubescens, and - f. hypoleuca; P. glabrescens; P. mascula var. corsica; P. morisii; P. officinalis var. corsica; P. ovalifolia; P. revelieri; P. russoi var. leiocarpa; P. russoi var. reverchonii

= Paeonia corsica =

Species of flowering plant

Paeonia corsica, also known as the Corsican peony, is a perennial herbaceous plant of 35–80 cm (14–31 in) high that belongs to the peonies. It naturally occurs on Corsica, Sardinia, on the Ionian islands and in western Greece. It has hairless green to purple stems, and the lower leaves consist mostly of nine leaflets with undersides which may carry felty hairs or are hairless. Its flowers have pink petals and purple filaments. Its vernacular name in Italian is peonia Corsa, and in French pivoine de Corse, both meaning "Corsican peony".

== Description ==
The Corsican peony is a diploid species (2n=10). It is a perennial herbaceous photosynthesising plant, which dies down in the autumn and reappears above the surface in spring. It flowers in April and May. Fruits may open from August onwards.

=== Root, stem and leaves ===
This peony has grey to brown roots shaped like carrots, about 2 cm (0.79 in) in diameter near the attachment of the stems and gradually becoming narrower towards their tips. It has stiff, erect, hairless, green to purple stems of 35–80 cm (14–31 in) high with five to seven scales at their base. The leaves have green to purple stalks which are hairless or carry soft hairs. The lower leaves further consist of three sets of mostly three rarely incised ovate to elliptic leaflets, each 4–13 cm (1.6–5.1 in) long and 2–8 cm (0.79–3.15 in) wide. These have a wedged to round base, an entire margin, a pointy tip, a hairless upper surface and a variously but mostly densely softly-hairy undersurface.

=== Flower, fruit and seed ===
Each stem may carry a single hermaphrodite flower that may be subtended by none or up to three leaflet-like bracts that may form a kind of involucre. The mostly two to five (occasionally as little as one or as much as eight) roundish sepals are unequal in size and vary in color from green to purple. These encircle seven or eight rose-colored inverted egg-shaped petals. Within are many stamens consisting of purple filaments and yellow anthers. A wavy disk of 1 mm (0.039 in) high with a toothed margin encircles the base of mostly two to five (rarely one or as much as eight) green, red or purple carpels. These are mostly covered in goldenbrown curving hairs of about 1½ mm (0.06 in) long, but sometimes hairless. The carpels are widest above midlength and 1½-3 mm (0.06-0.12 in) long styles on top connect them with the red stigmas. Seeds are black when ripe, round in diameter, and 7×5½ mm (0.22 × 0.28 in) in size. Seed development is quickened by warmth and arrested by cold. There is approximately a three-month delay between the initial development of the root and that of the earliest part of the stem (or hypocotyl). These responses to temperature make sure seedlings occur above ground at the most favorable time of the year.

=== Differences with related species ===
Paeonia cambessedesii currently in the wild limited to Majorca, also has pink flowers and mostly no more than nine leaflets per leaf and is a diploid. But it is entirely hairless, with the main veins and the underside of the leaves remaining purple throughout the season, the upperside greyish, and usually has four to eight carpels per flower, while P. corsica when fully developed has green leaflets, mostly hairy underneath, and two to five carpels per flower. Paeonia coriacea, restricted to Andalucia and Morocco, is a tetraploid, has magenta flowers, is entirely hairless, mostly has ten to fifteen roundish leaflets per leaf, and one or two hairless carpels per flower. P. corsica has pink flowers, ovate leaflets which are mostly hairy below, and one to five mostly softly hairy carpels per flower. Paeonia mascula, is known from northern Spain, France but not Corsica, through Italy including Sicily but excluding Sardinia, Greece excluding the Ionian isles and the adjoining mainland coast, and eastward to Lebanon and Iraq. It is a tetraploid that differs from P. corsica by its often white, or white with pink, (but in the east of its distribution pink or magenta) flowers, 3 mm (0.12 in) long light yellow straight bristly hairs on its carpels and mostly more than nine leaflets per leaf.

== Taxonomy ==
=== Taxonomic history ===
Franz Sieber described an almost hairless peony from Corsica in 1828 and named it Paeonia corsica. In 1837 Giuseppe Moris described a form from Sardinia and Corsica that differed in having a covering of soft hairs on the underside of the leaflets and on the carpels, calling it P. corallina var. pubescens. Without appearing aware of Sieber's publication, Ernest Cosson described the glabrous peony in 1850 as P. corallina var. leiocarpa, but he corrected this in 1887 by renaming it as P. corallina var. corsica. In the same publication he dealt with Moris's hairy form as a synonym of P. corallina var. russoi, thinking it was identical to P. russoi described from Sicily by Antonino de Bivona-Bernardi in 1816, and followed Webb (1838) by reducing the status of the taxon. This was supported by Ernst Huth in 1891. In 1875, Heinrich Moritz Willkomm thought P. corsica a junior synonym of P. corallina var. cambessedesii (now P. cambessedesii). In 1893, Georges Rouy and Julien Foucaud reduced the status of the hairless taxon to P. corallina f. corsica, and distinguished two additional forms with hairy carpels, f. ovalifolia - with variable indumentum on the leaflets - and f. triternata - with consistently pubescent undersides of the leaflets -. Adriano Fiori in 1898 regarded P. corallina a subspecies of P. mascula and thus named the taxon P. mascula subsp. corallina var. corsica. Max Gürke simplified this in 1903 to P. mascula var. corsica. In 1899 Antoine Legrand described a form with hairless carpels but hairy undersides of the leaflets and called it P. russoi var. reverchoni. Claude Jordan described two new types from Corsica in 1903, one with leaflets with red veins and softly haired undersides, and hairy carpels, he called P. revelieri, and one with hairless leaflets and softly haired carpels, he named P. glabrescens. John Isaac Briquet distinguished a further glabrous taxon, P. corallina var. pubescens f. hypoleuca. Ascherson and Paul Graebner in 1923 regarded P. corallina var. leiocarpa and P. cambessedesii as synonyms of P. corallina var. corsica. F.C. Stern treated this taxon in 1946 as a synonym of P. russoi var. leiocarpa. Zangheri, Sandro Pignatti and Schmitt thought P. corsica synonymous to P. coriacea in 1976, 1982 and 1997 respectively. Dimitris Tzanoudakis distinguished in 1977 three subspecies of P. mascula in Greece, among which P. mascula subsp. russoi from the Ionian islands and the corresponding mainland coastal area he regarded identical to Bivona's taxon. In 2001 Cesca found a form from Sardinia with purplish stems and long hairs on the leaflets' undersurfaces he regarded sufficiently different to create a new species, P. morisii, and it was recognised by Passalaqua and Bernardo in 2004, who also extended the range of P. mascula subsp. russoi to include Calabria. Most recent authors thought P. mascula subsp. russoi described from Sicily also is present on Sardina and Corsica.

=== Modern classification ===
Specimens from Corsica, Sardinia and the Ionian isles were all shown to be diploids with ten chromosomes (2n=10), mostly have nine leaflets in the lower leaves, which often have rather hairy undersides with soft curved golden brown hairs of about 1½ mm (0.06 in) long on the carpels, although hairlessness also occurs. The sampled populations from Sicily and Euboea however are all tetraploids (4n=20), mostly with ten to twenty leaflets in the basal leaves, not or sparsely hairy, while the light yellow hairs on the carpels are straight and rather bristly (or hispid) and about 3 mm (0.12 in) long. The peonies of Corsica, Sardinia, the Ionian isles and the adjoining mainland coast are therefore considered conspecific, and should be named P. corsica, while the Sicilian, Calabrian and some of the Greek populations belong to P. mascula.

== Distribution and habitat ==
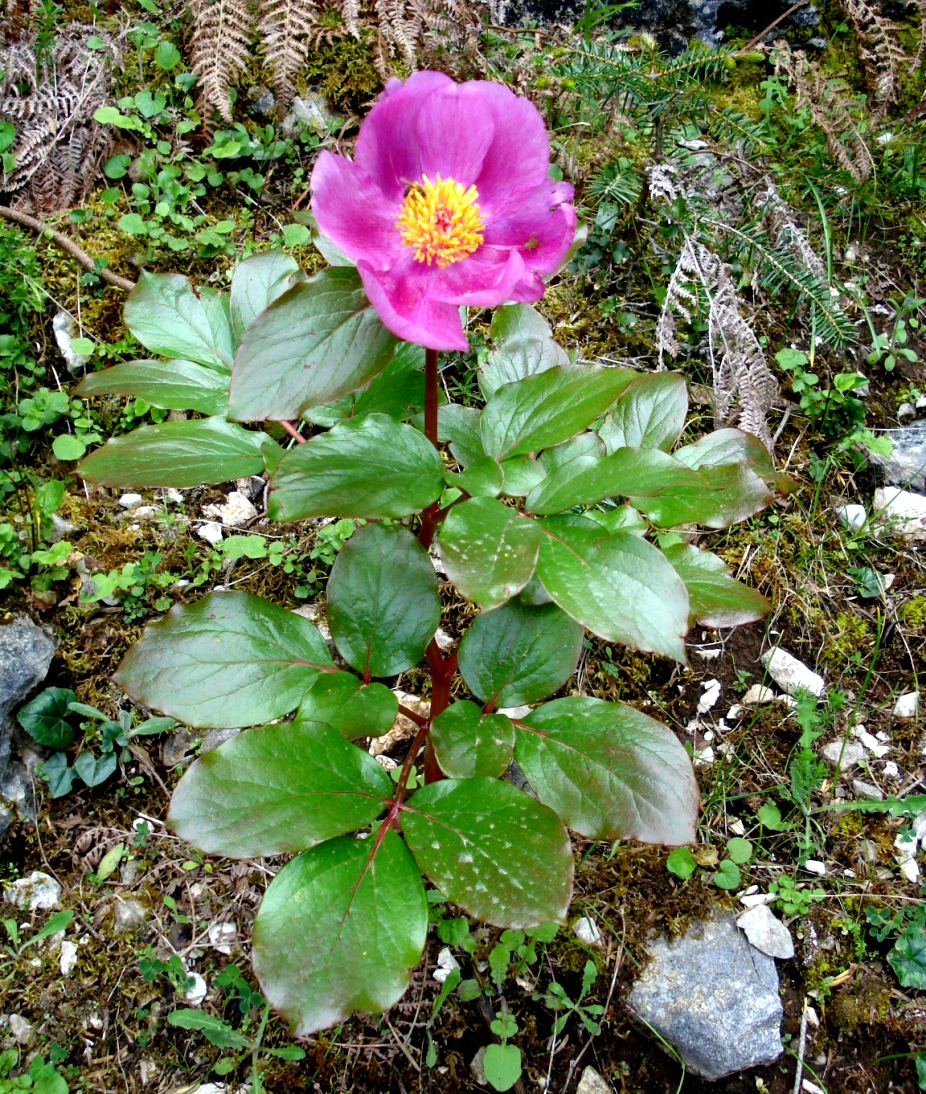
Paeonia corsica, Cephalonia

Paeonia mascula has the same picture

P. corsica naturally occurs on Corsica, Sardinia and in Greece on the Ionian islands Cephalonia, Lefkada and Zakynthos, and mainland Aetolia-Acarnania. It grows in pine and oak dominated forests, in maquis shrubland and on grassy places on various soils and bedrock (such as limestone, granite and metamorphic).

== Cultivation ==
This species has recently sparsely become available for gardeners. It is praised as a rather low peony, with shiny purple tinged young foliage, that is regarded suitable for sunny rock gardens. It is advised to guard against moisture during the summer.
