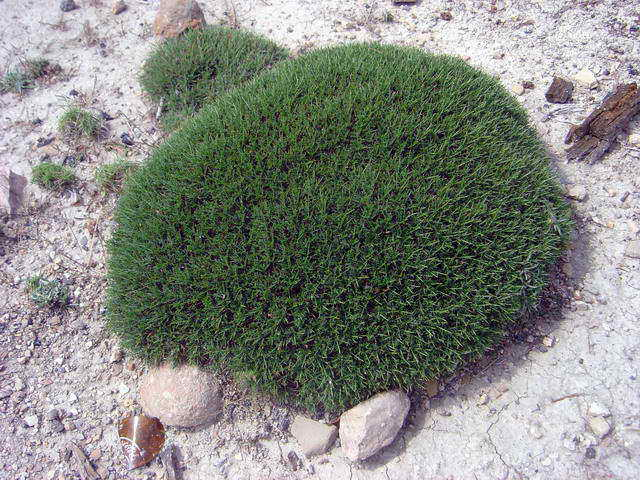

Scientific classification
- Kingdom: Plantae
- Clade: Embryophytes
- Clade: Tracheophytes
- Clade: Spermatophytes
- Clade: Angiosperms
- Clade: Eudicots
- Clade: Rosids
- Order: Fabales
- Family: Fabaceae
- Subfamily: Faboideae
- Genus: Astragalus
- Species: A. balearicus

Binomial name
- Astragalus balearicus Chater

Synonyms
- Tragacantha balearica (Chater) Romo

= Astragalus balearicus =

Species of legume

Astragalus balearicus, commonly known as the Balearic milkvetch or gatovell, is a small legume of the genus Astragalus that is found on the Balearic Islands off the coast of Spain.

== Description ==
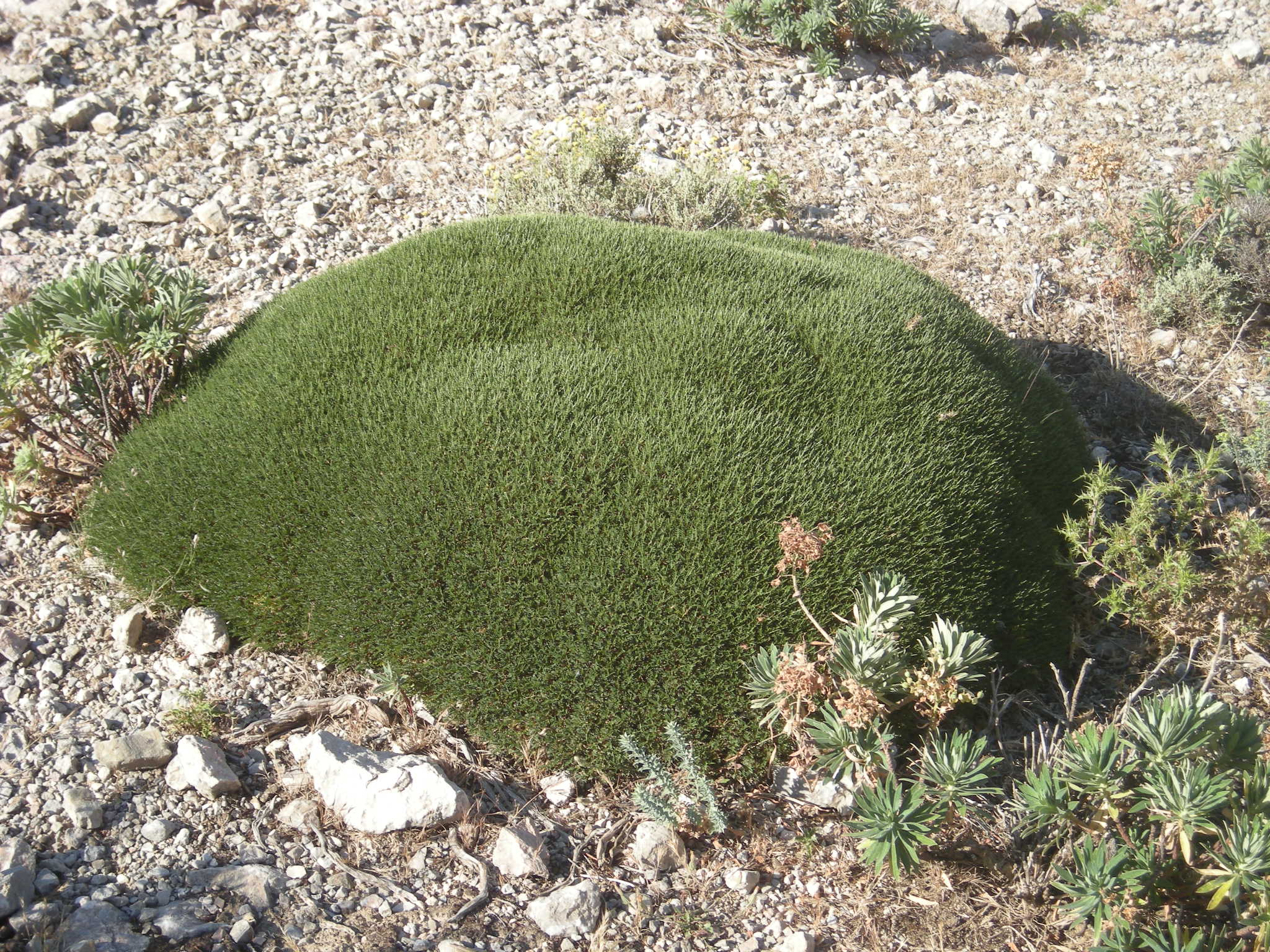
Astragalus balearicus

Astragalus balearicus is a small rotund bush with dense leafy foliage. Its leaves are 1 to 3 cm (0.39 to 1.2 in) long and commonly divide into between three and five leaflets. It has flowers that are between 10 and 13 mm (0.39 and 0.51 in) long and appear between March and July. Its legumes measure between 7 and 9 mm (0.28 and 0.35 in), are glabrous and are slightly ovate.

In appearance, it resembles a hedgehog, hence its popular name of eriçóns (hedgehog). It is also known locally as coixinet de monja (nun's pad) and eixorba-rates negre (black rat).

== Etymology and taxonomy ==
Astragalus balearicus was first described by Arthur Oliver Chater in 1968. Assigned to the genus Astragalus, derived from the Greek άστράγαλος, Chater gave it a geographical epithet due to its prevalence on the Belearic islands. The species is similar to Astragalus massiliensis which is found in Sardinia, from which it probably diverged at the end of the Oligocene when the islands separated from mainland France.

== Distribution and habitat ==
The legume is endemic to Mallorca and Minorca in the Mediterranean Sea, where the cushion-like thorns of the plant create a landscape typical of the islands. It is particularly abundant in the Serra de Tramuntana.

It grows on limestone soils that are more than 1,000 metres (3,300 ft) above sea level. It prefers dry, windy, particularly exposed mountainous or coastal, environments which have deep calcareous soils. It is found with species like Paeonia cambessedesii. The species is considered to be of Least Concern in the IUCN Red List.

== See also ==
- Wildlife of Spain
