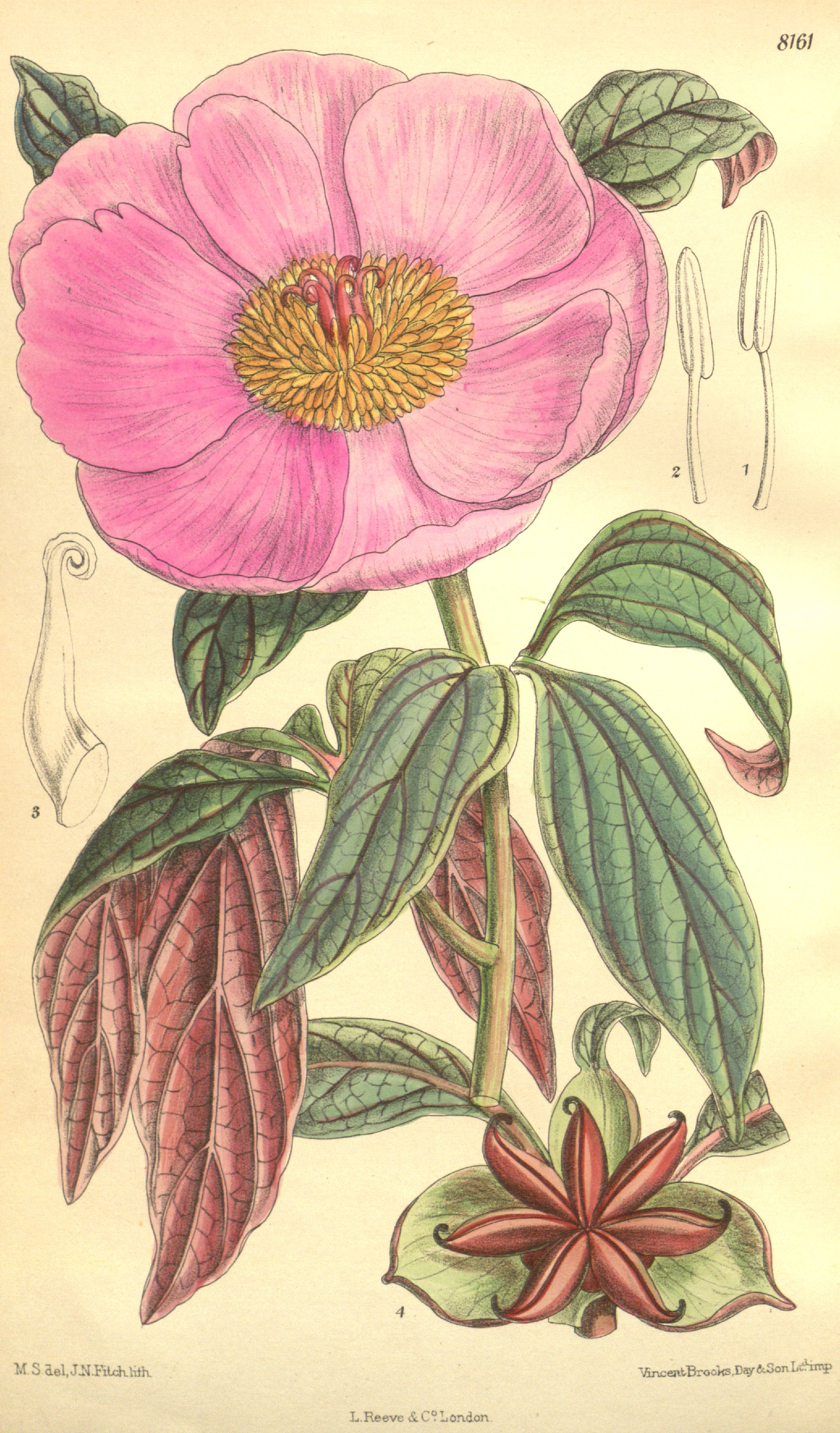
- Illustration, Botanical Magazine

Scientific classification
- Kingdom: Plantae
- Clade: Tracheophytes
- Clade: Angiosperms
- Clade: Eudicots
- Order: Saxifragales
- Family: Paeoniaceae
- Genus: Paeonia
- Species: P. cambessedesii

Binomial name
- Paeonia cambessedesii (Willk.) Willk.

Synonyms
- P. corallina var. cambessedesii; P. mascula ssp. cambessedesii

= Paeonia cambessedesii =

Species of flowering plant

Paeonia cambessedesii is a perennial herbaceous species of peony about 45 cm high. It has pink flowers. The stems, major veins and undersides of the leaves remain purple red, while the upper surface of the leaves turns into a metallic bluish green when fully grown and its lower leaves consist of no more than nine leaflets or segments. This endemic of the Balearic Islands is now limited to parts of northeastern and northwestern Majorca. In English it is sometimes called Balearic peony or Majorcan peony.

== Description ==
Paeonia cambessedesii is a clump-forming, perennial, herbaceous peony, which dies down in the autumn, and overwinters with buds just under the surface of the soil, and may reach a height of 25–60 cm. The reddish purple stem carries several alternately arranged leaves. The lowest leaves consist of nine leathery, hairless leaflets which are lanceolate to inverted egg-shaped with a pointy tip. The upper surface of the leafblade is bluish green with a metallic gloss, while the main veins are reddish purple, and the underside of the leafblade is purple. Each stem carries one cup-shaped flower of 6–12 cm with usually eight (5-10) pale to purplish pink petals, and is said to smell of roses. Within is a circle of numerous purple filaments topped by yellow anthers. The center of the flower consists of three to nine, initially purple carpels, each of which is connected through a thick style with a reddish stigma on top. The stigmas ripen before the stamens, a situation called protogyny. The three to eight (mostly four to six) carpels develop into dry dehiscent fruits (called follicles) of about 6 cm long, that open with a suture along their lengths, and contain initially carmine colored seeds that turn glossy black when fully ripe.

=== Growth cycle ===
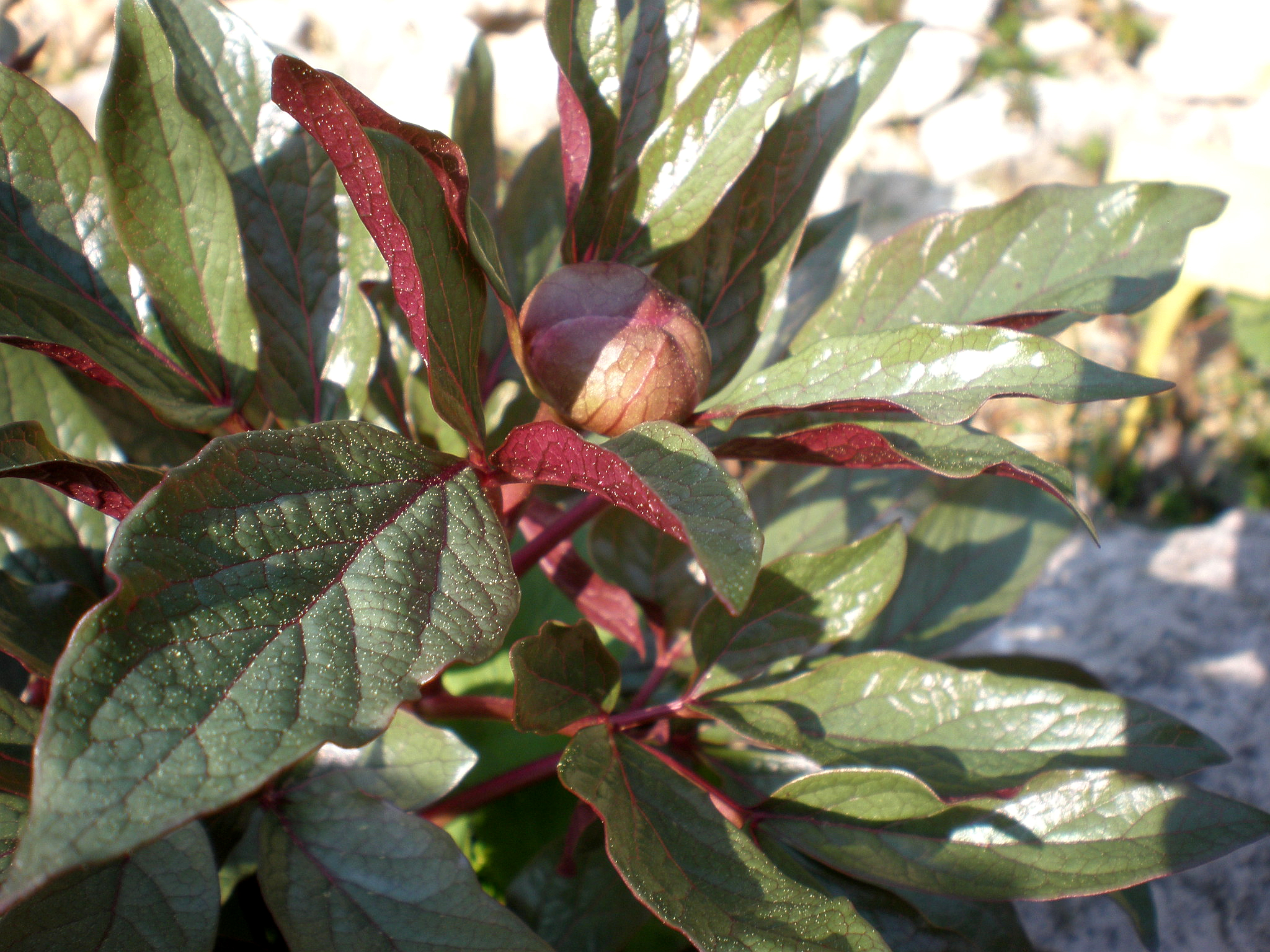

In February the stalks which have an intense garnet color emerge from the soil. This color is the result of a high concentration of anthocyanins, whose dark color absorbs sunlight and prevents freezing of these young and tender parts early in the year. In March the emerging stem unfolds and leaves and buds become clearly visible. A few weeks later flowering may start. First the stigmas are fertile for a few days, while the anthers remain closed to prevent self-pollination. By the time the ovaries have been fertilized, the anthers mature and pollen can be picked up by insects and carried to other flowers.

In late August, the ripe fruits open and the shiny black seeds can be dispersed. Unfertilised seeds appear as red, soft granules with flat surfaces. The seedlings of this peony usually only appear after several winters. Young plants first appear in early spring and are protected against frost by their high anthocyanin content.

=== Differences with related species ===
P. cambessedesii differs from all other peonies as its lower leaves have (seven to) nine entire leaflets, never more or incised, all its parts are absolutely hairless, it has on average more carpels per flower than any other Eurasian herbaceous peony: (3-) 4-6 (-8), and it has nearly always reddish purple stems and undersides of the leaves throughout the season. It is most related to P. russoi, from Corsica and Sardinia, but that species is a tetraploid, and the upper surface of its leaves retain a purple hue even when fully developed.

== Taxonomy ==
P. cambessedesii is a diploid (2n=10) species of hybrid origin, and is, like all other Eurasian herbaceous species, assigned to the section Paeonia. One of the parents of P. cambessedesii is P. lactiflora, the other parent is not fully certain but most likely P. mairei, but P. obovata may also have played a role in the genetic make-up of P. cambessedesii. The tetraploid P. russoi is very likely of the same origin, and could be regarded its sister species.

=== Etymology ===
The species is named in honor of Jacques Cambessèdes, a French botanist who collected in the Balearic Islands.

== Distribution and ecology ==
Paeonia cambessedesii is an endemic of the Balearic Islands, at one time present on Mallorca, Menorca and Cabrera, but now limited to the mountainous Northeast of Mallorca, such as in the Parc Natural de Llevant, and Northwest, such as the slopes of the Puig Major, where it grows on rocky limestone slopes or below limestone cliffs. It grows together with species like Aristolochia bianorum, Astragalus balearicus, Galium balearicum, Helichrysum italicum, Helleborus lividus, Hypericum balearicum, Pastinaca lucida, Rosmarinus officinalis, Rubia angustifolia, Scrophularia canina, Santolina chamaecyparissus, Smilax aspera, Teucrium asiaticum and T. marum. Like all peonies, the Balearic peony is very poisonous, and is avoided by grazers. The flowers are pollinated by bees and other insects.

== Conservation ==
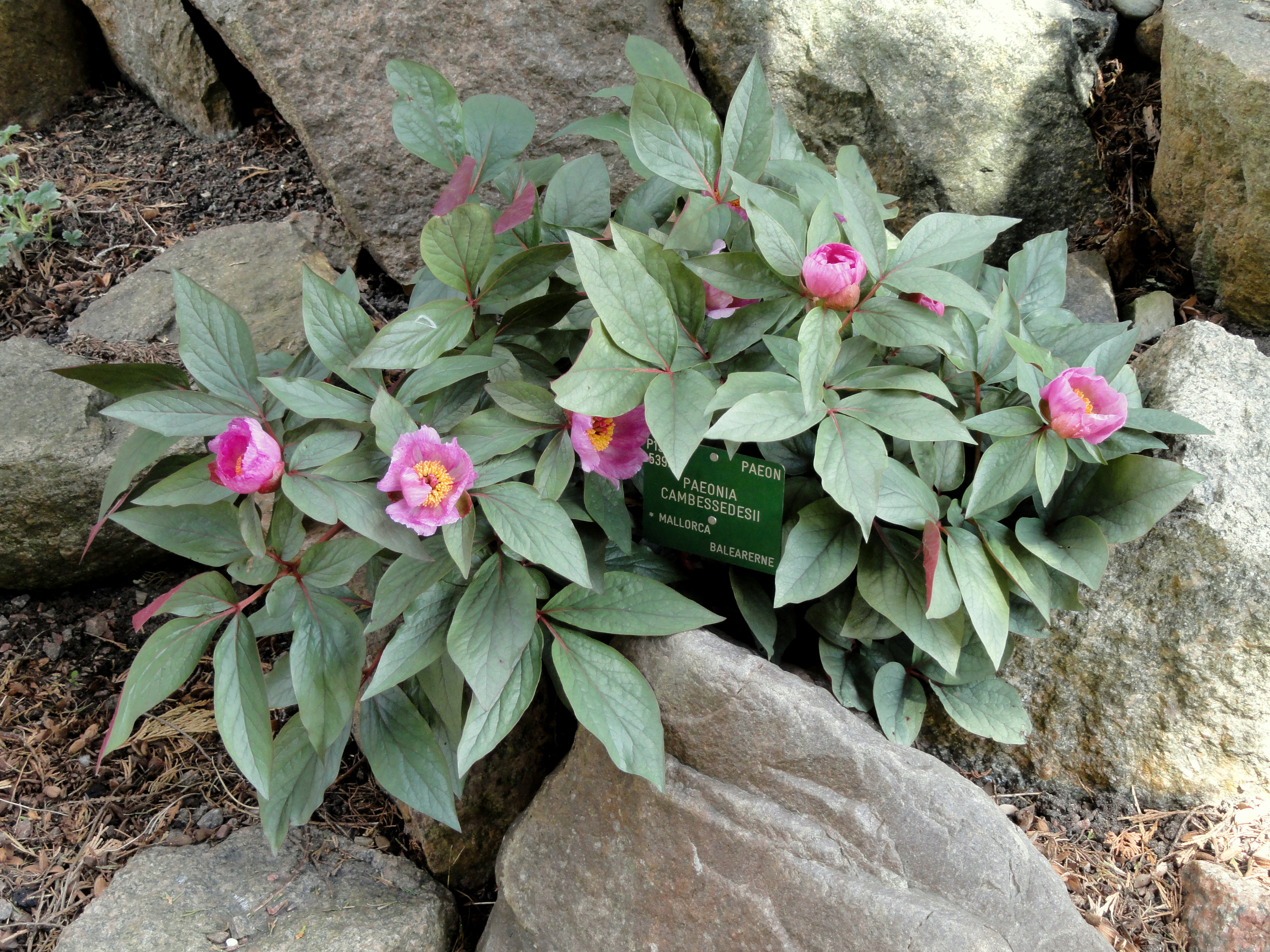

The Balearic peony's territory has shrunk, not only as a result of damage inflicted by grazing animals such as feral goats, but due also to the picking of flowers and the uprooting of wild plants for garden use by humans. Habitat degradation is a further contributing factor, growth sites being damaged or destroyed by urban sprawl, including tourism-related development.

== Cultivation ==
The plant is now regarded as a collector's item for plantsmen's gardens. The plant is probably not very hardy and vulnerable to stagnant water, so may be expected to perform best in temperate climates when offered deep, well-draining, lime-rich soil, in a warm, sunny and well protected location. In cultivation the plant has gained the Royal Horticultural Society's Award of Garden Merit.

=== Germination ===
It is suggested that seeds can be tricked into early germination by putting them in a closed container under a moist topsoil and storing them in a refrigerator for three or four months. In early spring the seeds can be sown outside and these usually germinate within a few weeks without problems. If the seeds do not germinate after the first cold treatment, it is advised to repeat it until successful. The small seedlings of Paeonia cambessedesii share the intense gamut of color with the shoots of their parents and are protected against frost this way. It may take four or five years before the plant is capable of producing its first flower.

== Other uses ==
The root of the Balearic peony is said to have been used as a cure against epilepsy.
