= Alfred Chabert =

French botanist

Alfred Charles Chabert (Chambéry, 29 February 1836 – Chambéry, 1 October 1916) was a physician in the French army and a botanist. He developed an interest in botany at an early age. He started to explore the natural life around his home town in 1848, at the age of twelve, together with his friend and botanist André Songeon (1826–1905). Several plant species were named in his honor, such as Lamanonia chabertii, Knautia chabertii, Luzula chabertii, and Rhinanthus chabertii.

== Army career ==
Chabert became a doctor of medicine at the Faculty of Turin in 1858 at the age of 22. He worked as a physician during the 1859 Second Italian War of Independence, for which he received the Medal of Italy. When in 1860, Savoy was ceded to France, Chabert chose the French nationality. During the Franco-Prussian War of 1870–71, he served in the 4th Corps of the Army of the Rhine, for which he was appointed Knight of the Legion of Honor. From then on he worked in several military hospitals. He retired in 1889 due to his deteriorating health.

== Botany ==
Chabert was an active botanist from an early age until his death. His friendship with André Songeon lasted more than half a century. In 1852, the parents of both young men considered their enthusiasm so excessive, that they decided to restrict their relationship. They stopped meeting in their home town Chambéry, but went on excursions in the mountains regularly.
