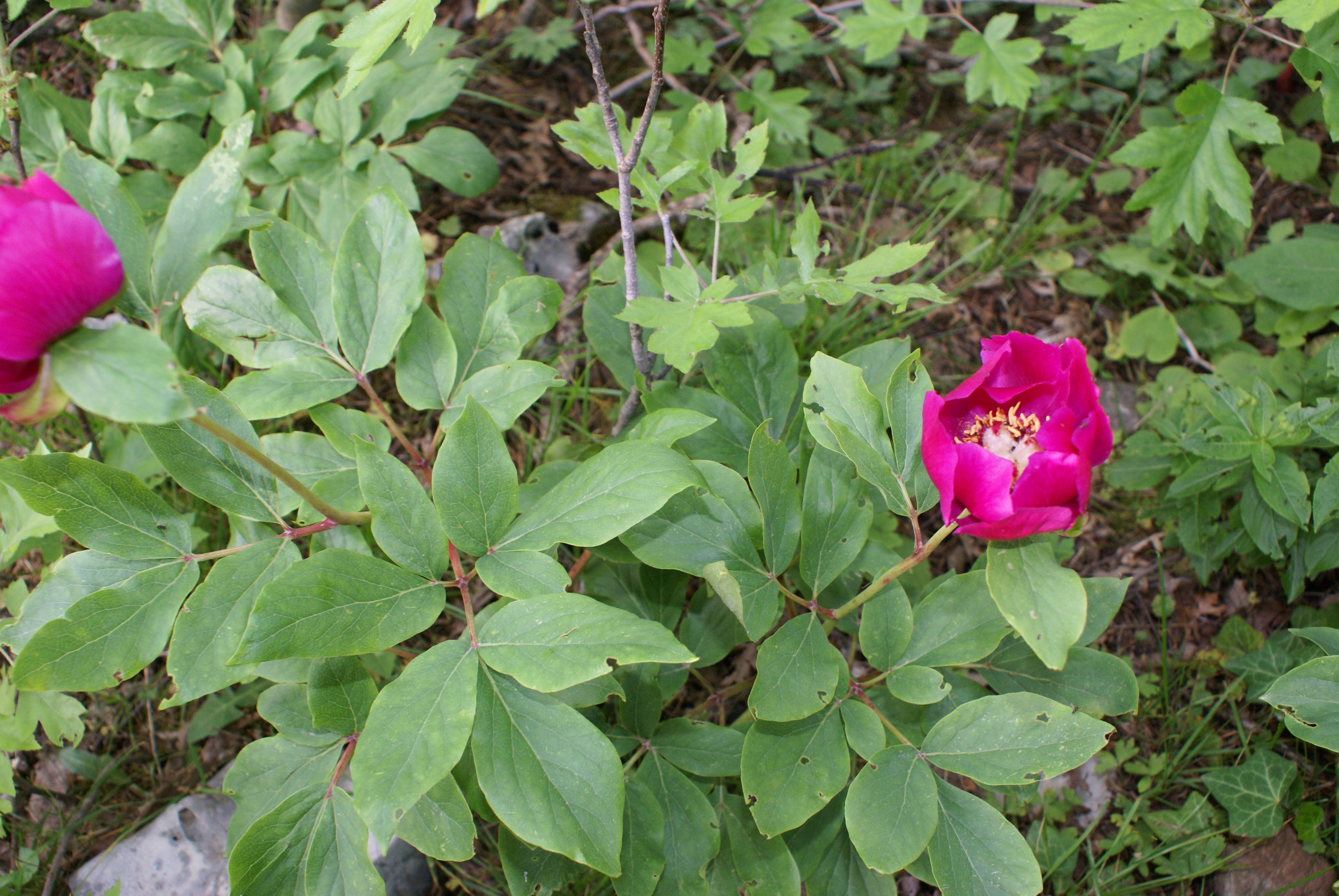

Scientific classification
- Kingdom: Plantae
- Clade: Tracheophytes
- Clade: Angiosperms
- Clade: Eudicots
- Order: Saxifragales
- Family: Paeoniaceae
- Genus: Paeonia
- Species: P. kesrouanensis

Binomial name
- Paeonia kesrouanensis (J.Thiébaut) J.Thiébaut

= Paeonia kesrouanensis =

Species of peony

Paeonia kesrouanensis is a species of peony native to Syria, Turkey and Lebanon. It is very similar to P. mascula, bearing rose-red flowers.

It is easily recognizable by its glabrous carpels and a long coiled stigma at the top.
