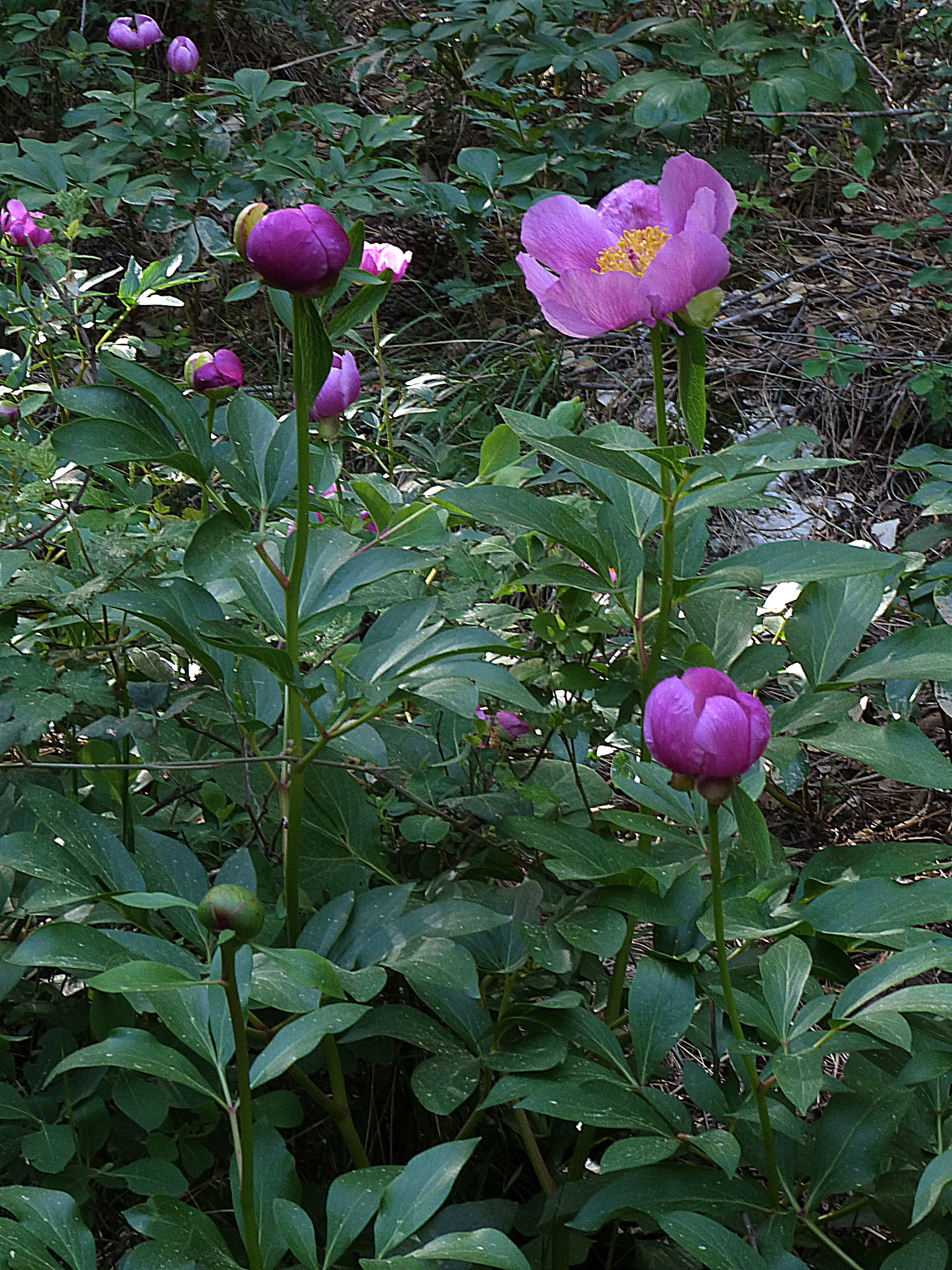

Scientific classification
- Kingdom: Plantae
- Clade: Tracheophytes
- Clade: Angiosperms
- Clade: Eudicots
- Order: Saxifragales
- Family: Paeoniaceae
- Genus: Paeonia
- Species: P. coriacea

Binomial name
- Paeonia coriacea Boiss.

Synonyms
- Paeonia corallina subsp. coriacea (Boiss.) Maire Paeonia coriacea var. maroccana (Pau & Font Quer) Romo; Paeonia mascula subsp. coriacea (Boiss.) Malag.

= Paeonia coriacea =

Species of flowering plant

Paeonia coriacea, also known as the Andalusian peony, is a species of flowering plant within the family Paeoniaceae.

== Description ==
P. coriacea is a herbaceous, perennial species. Plants possess stems that range in height from 40–90 cm tall. Stems can be up to 1cm in diameter and can range in colour from green and to purple. Leaves are green and range from 5–15 cm long and 2–8 cm wide. Flowers stand on the top of stems. Each stem can hold a single solitary flower. Flowers are pink in colour and possess yellow anthers.

== Distribution and habitat ==
Paeonia coriacea is native to Spain and Morocco, where it can be found growing in Andalusia and in the Rif Mountains. It is often associated with woodland habitats consisting of mostly Quercus or Cedrus tree species. P. coriacea also has a preference for limestone areas where it sometimes nestles itself into crevices on rocky slopes. It is found at altitudes ranging from 600–2100 meters above sea level.
