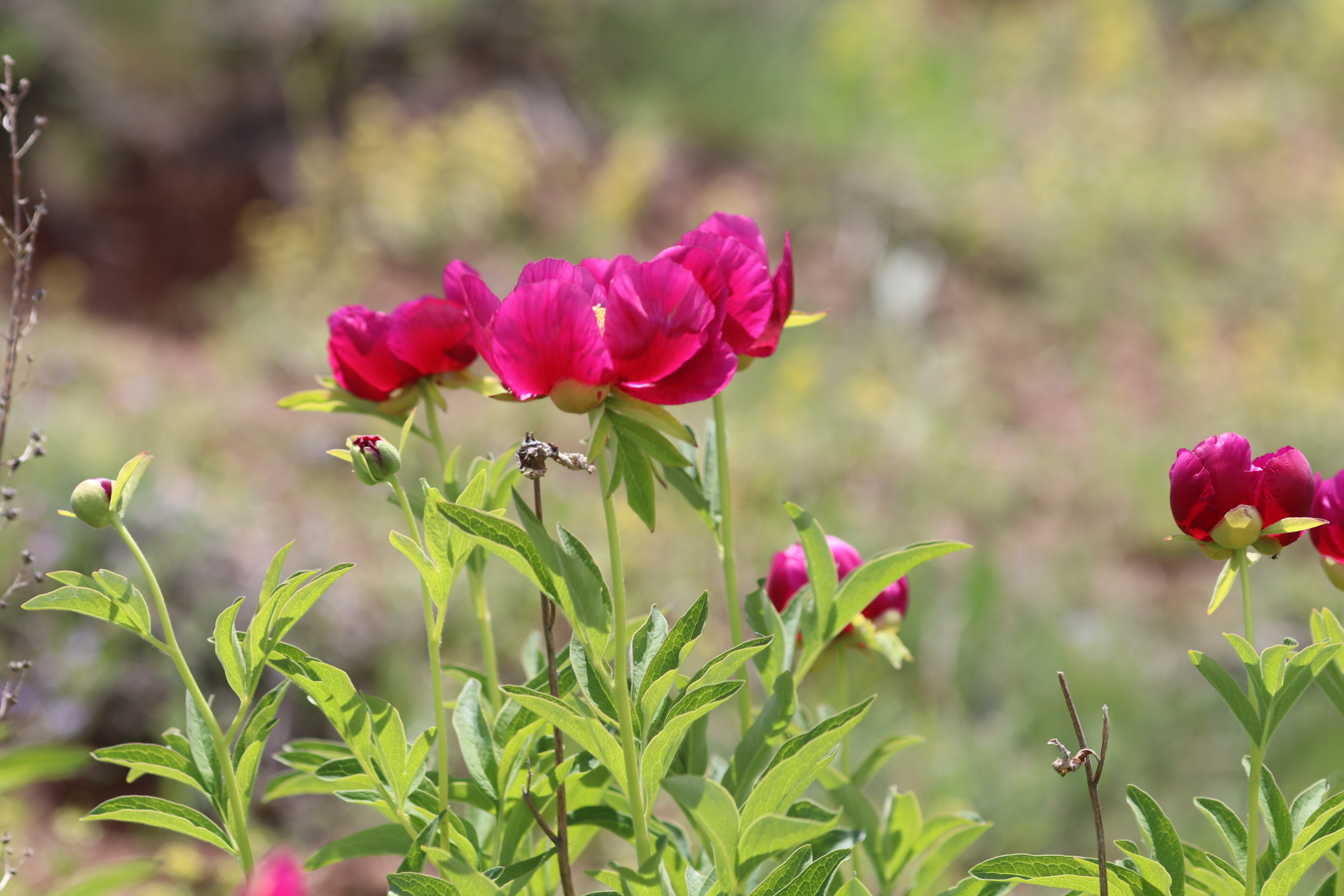

Scientific classification
- Kingdom: Plantae
- Clade: Tracheophytes
- Clade: Angiosperms
- Clade: Eudicots
- Order: Saxifragales
- Family: Paeoniaceae
- Genus: Paeonia
- Species: P. mascula

Binomial name
- Paeonia mascula (L.) Mill.

Synonyms
- Paeonia corallina Retz.; Paeonia integra J.A.Murray; Paeonia integrifolia Link; Paeonia mas Garsault nom. illeg.; Paeonia mascula L. ex Desf. nom. illeg.; Paeonia mascula L. ex Beck nom. illeg.

= Paeonia mascula =

Species of flowering plant

Paeonia mascula is a species of peony. It is a herbaceous perennial 0.5–1.5 m (1.6–4.9 ft) tall, with leaves that are divided into three segments, and large red flowers in late spring and early summer. Native to Syria, Spain, France, Italy, Croatia, Bosnia and Herzegovina, Serbia, Cyprus, Montenegro, Bulgaria Greece, Turkey, Iraq, Lebanon and Israel, this wild peony has become naturalised on two small islands in the UK.

== Taxonomy ==
The following subspecies have been defined.

- Paeonia mascula subsp. mascula
- Paeonia mascula subsp. bodurii
- Paeonia mascula subsp. hellenica
- Paeonia mascula subsp. russoi.

== Distribution and habitat ==
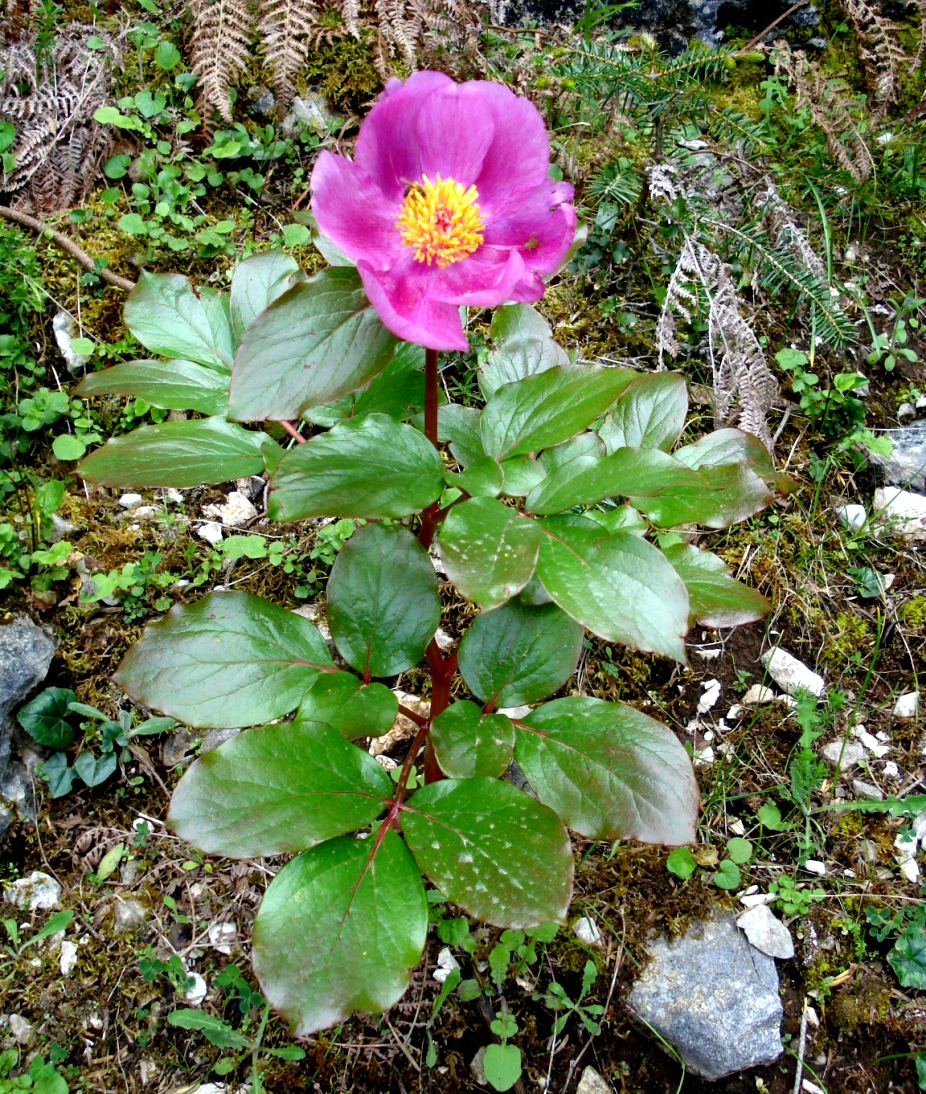
Paeonia mascula ssp. russoi, Cephalonia

Paeonia mascula is at risk in its natural environment due to the demand from private collectors and there is a significant trade in wild P. mascula from Turkey.

Ideal conditions are light (sandy) soils although and most peonies can grow in heavy clay soil. The Wild Peony prefers acid and neutral soils, can grow in semi-shade and tolerates drought.

The wild peony was introduced to the island of Steep Holm in the Bristol Channel, possibly by monks. 37 plants were taken to nearby Flat Holm island by Frank Harris, the farmer at the time, in the 1930s, many of which died during the World War II occupation and fortification of the island. One remaining plant was reintroduced by the Flat Holm Warden in 1982 and is protected by fencing near the path to the lighthouse. A few plants grown from seed also survive in the farmhouse garden.

== Flowering cycle ==
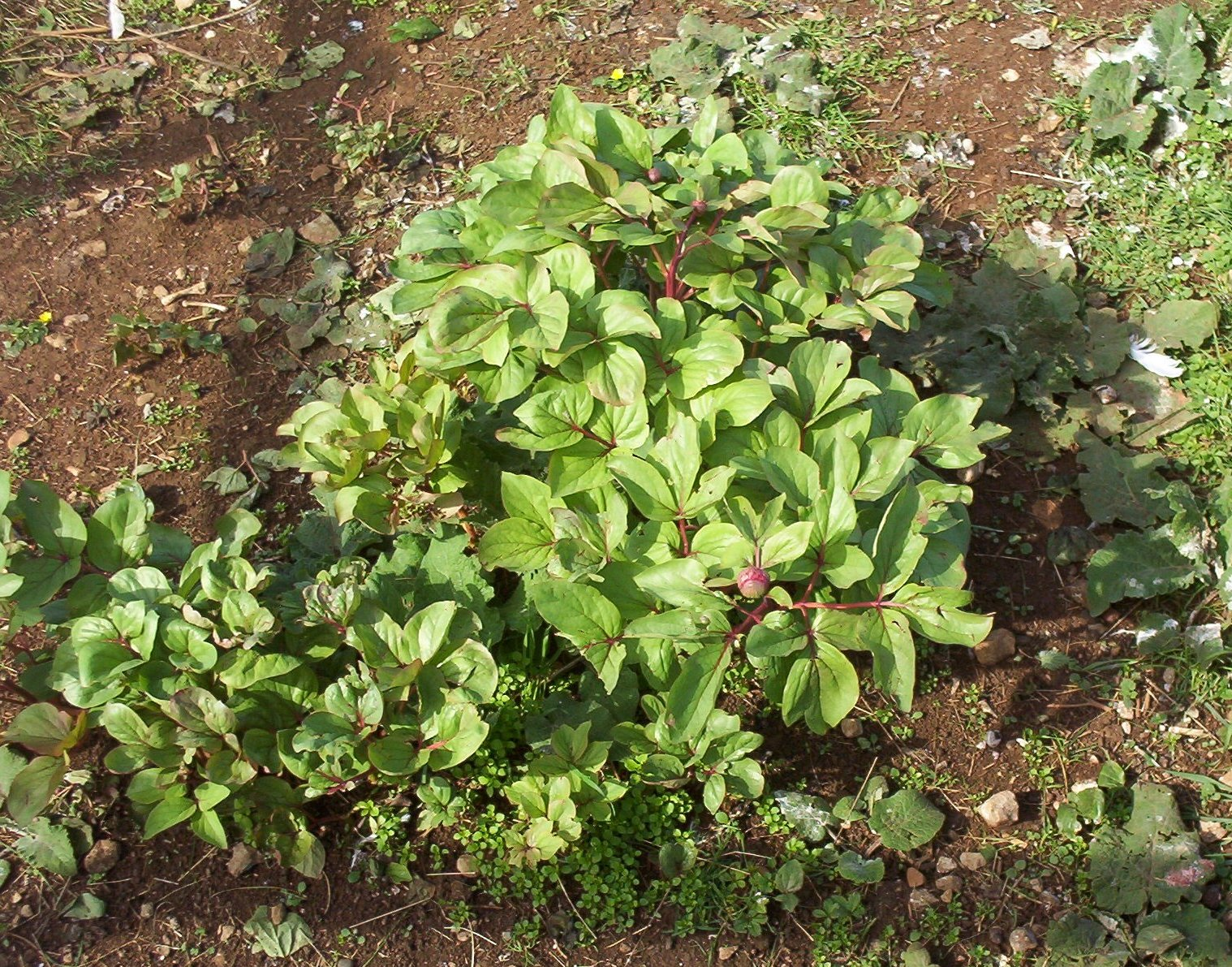
Wild peony on Flat Holm island beginning to bud in early May

Paeonia mascula flowers for just one week of the year normally in May or June in the Northern Hemisphere, and the seedpods (at one stage referred to as 'jester's hats') develop during the summer before bursting open to scatter seeds in August or September. The flowers are hermaphrodite and pollinated by insects. The plant is self-fertile.

Steep Holm and Flat Holm are the only known places in the UK where the wild peony has naturalised. The likely reason for this is that the islands provide a habitat similar to the Mediterranean islands where the plants originate from and the relative isolation allows them some protection.

== Uses ==
The roots of P. mascula were ground to a powder and used to treat colds and sore throats.

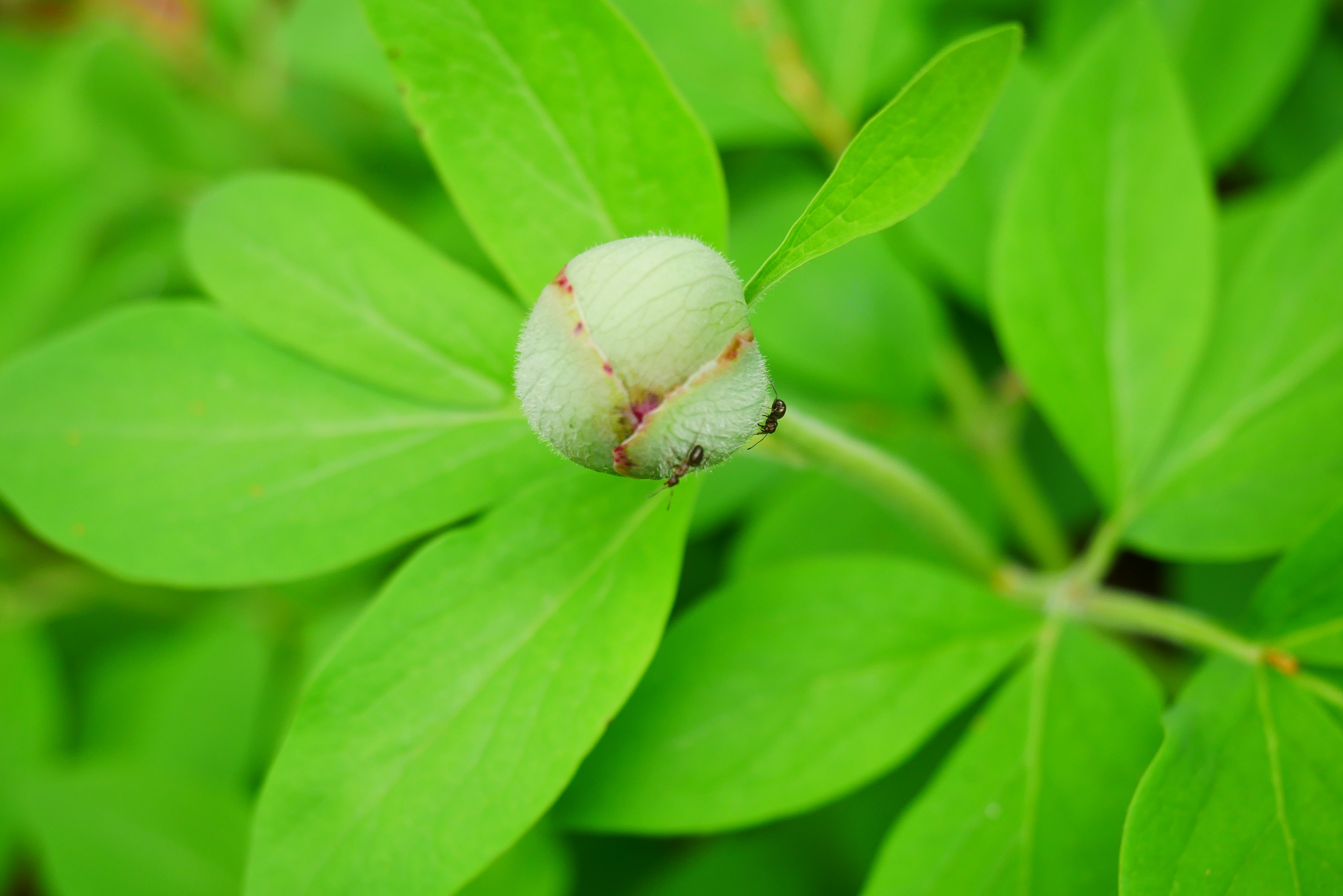
Paeonia mascula from Turkey bud

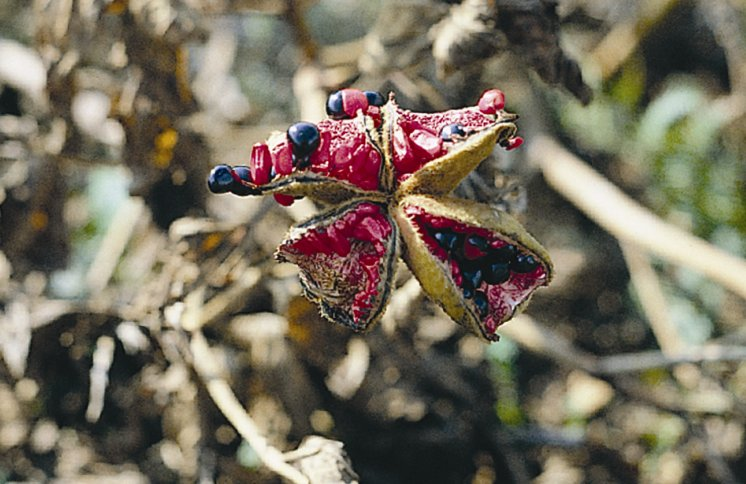
Open fruit, showing the seeds

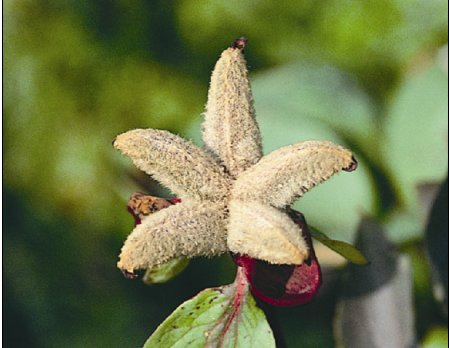
The fruit known as jester's hats

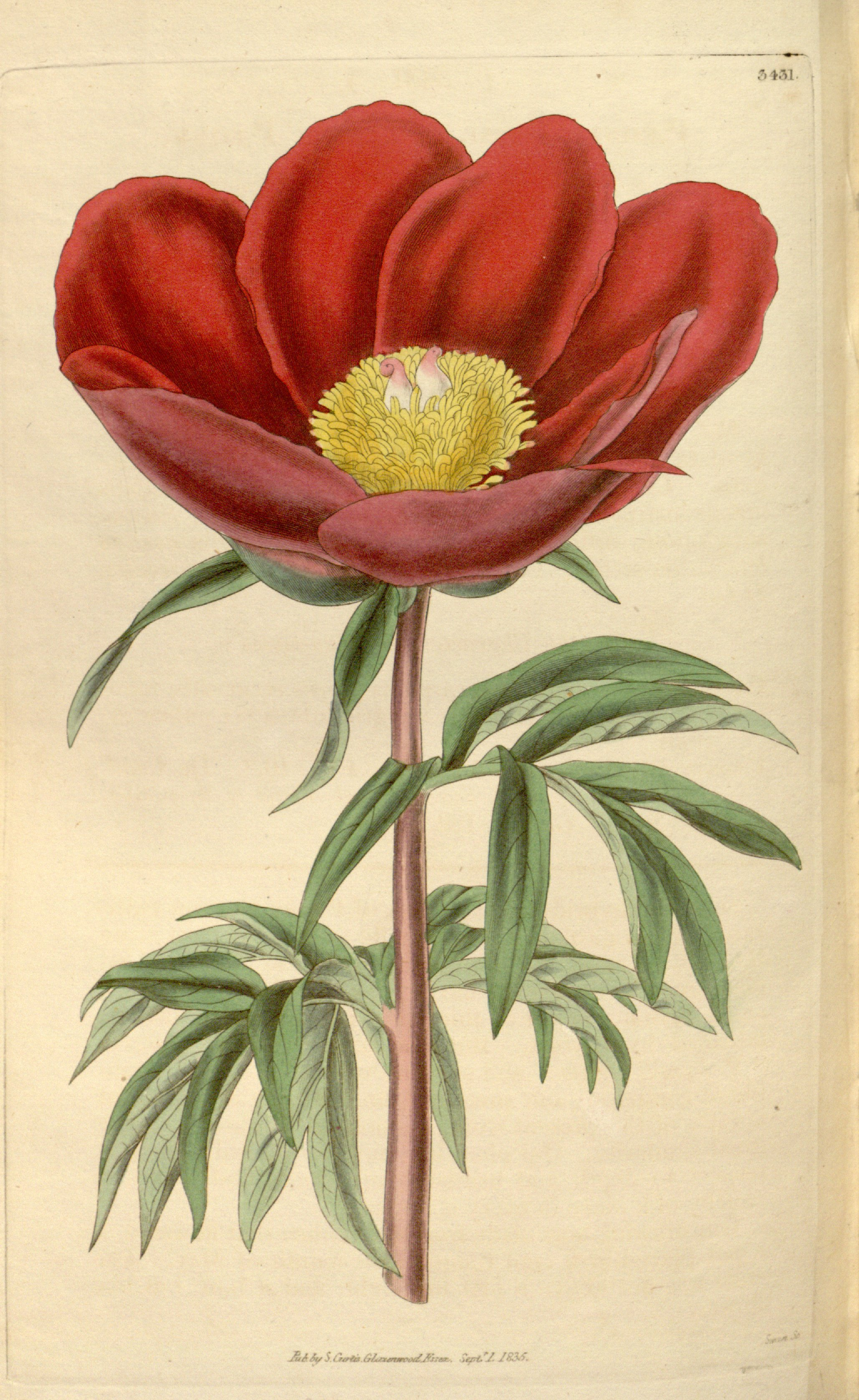
Botanical drawing of Paeonia muscula

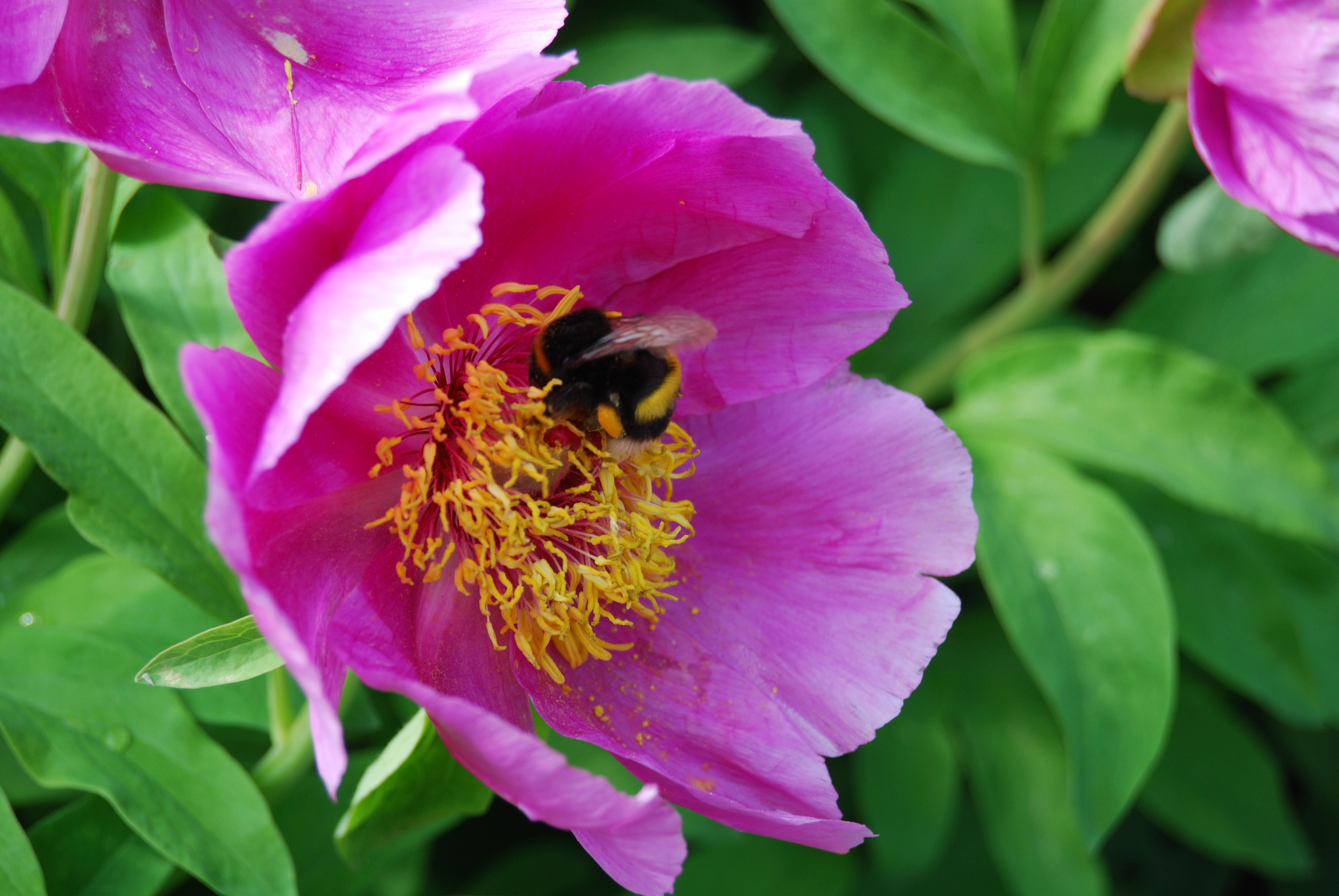
Paeonia muscula with pollinator visitor
