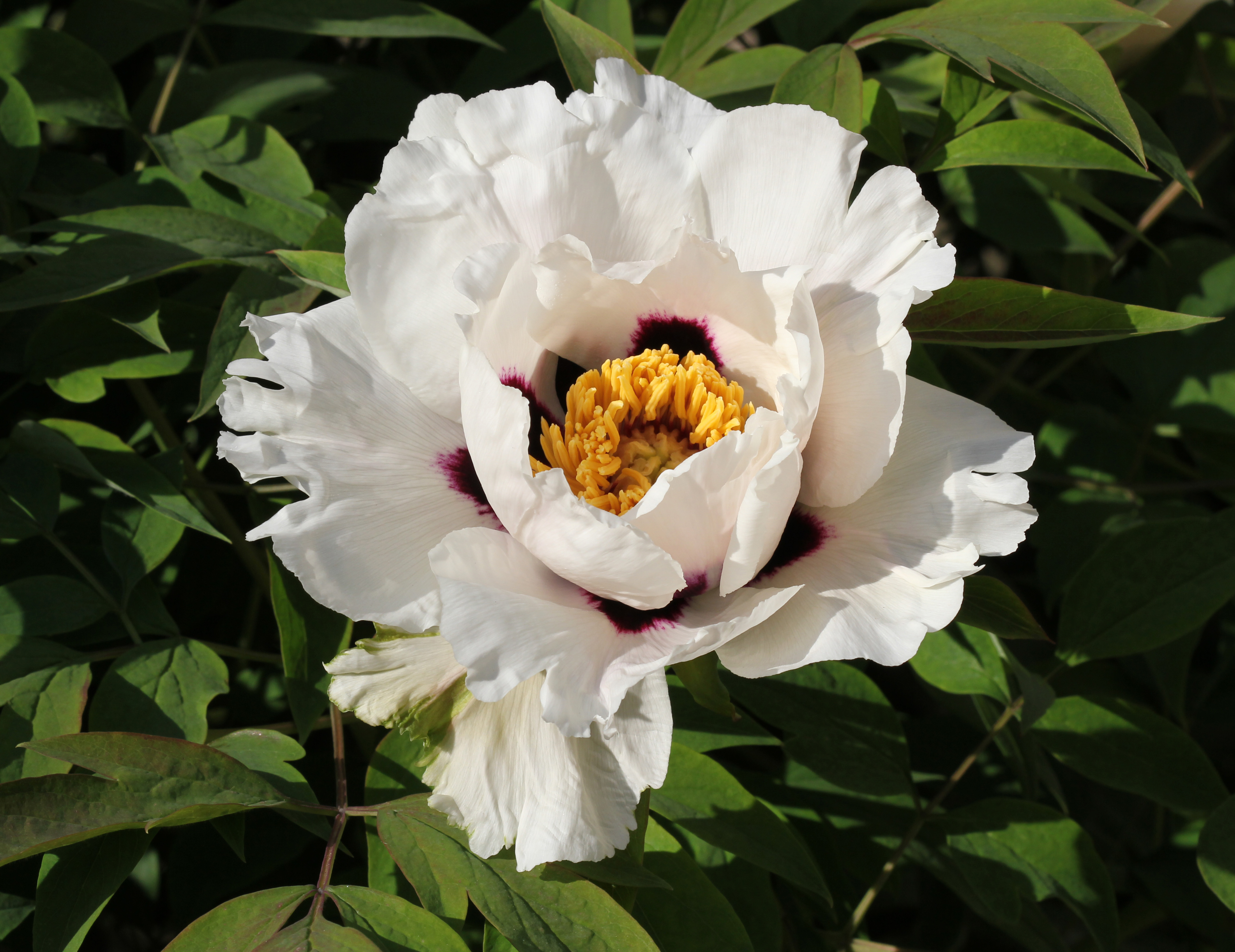
- Single flower of Rock's peony

Scientific classification
- Kingdom: Plantae
- Clade: Tracheophytes
- Clade: Angiosperms
- Clade: Eudicots
- Order: Saxifragales
- Family: Paeoniaceae
- Genus: Paeonia
- Section: Paeonia sect. Moutan; DC

Subsections
- Delavayana; Vaginatae

= Tree peony =

Section of plants in genus Paeonia

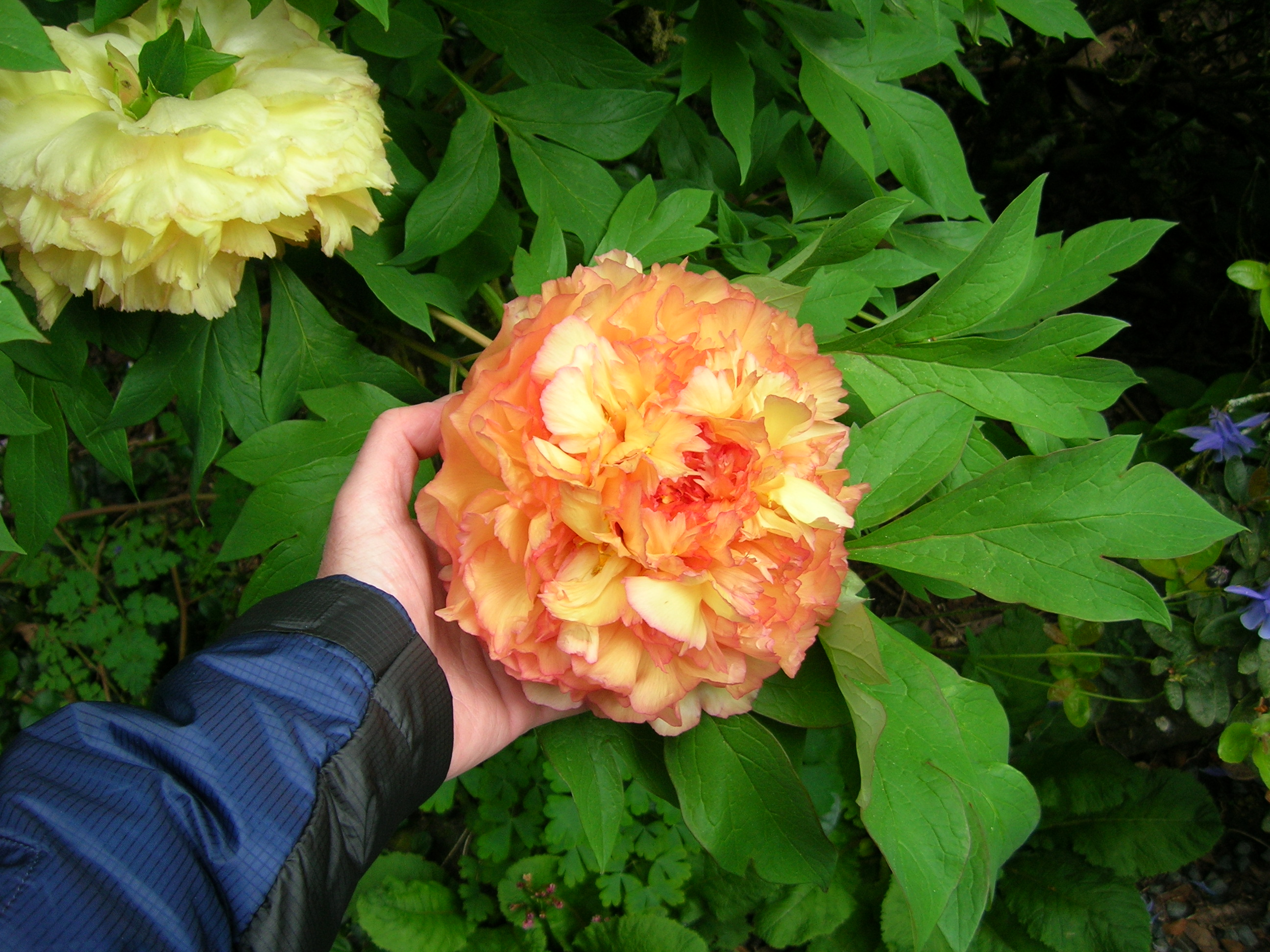
Tree peony hybrid 'Maxime Cornu' of the P. × lemoinei group, is a hybrid between subsection Delavayana (P. delavayi) and subsection Vaginatae (P. suffruticosa 'La Ville de Saint-Denis').

Tree peony is the vernacular name for the section Moutan of the plant genus Paeonia, or one of the species or cultivars belonging to this section. It consists of shrubs that have perennial aerial woody stems. Other peonies do not have perennial woody stems, but their stems die back after the growing season, to emerge again from buds just below the surface early in the following year. Tree peonies have been in culture in China for millennia, and it is likely that hybrids came into being in gardens, where different wild tree peony species were planted closely together. They are used in China both for medicine and as an ornamental, particularly the hybrids called Paeonia suffruticosa. These hybrids in particular, but other tree peonies too, are called mǔdān (牡丹) in China.

== Taxonomy ==
Two subsections are recognised within the section Moutan: Delavayana and Vaginatae.

Species assigned to the section Moutan are:

subsection Delavayana
- Paeonia delavayi
- Paeonia ludlowii
subsection Vaginatae
- Paeonia cathayana
- Paeonia decomposita
- Paeonia jishanensis
- Paeonia ostii
- Paeonia qiui
- Paeonia rockii
- Paeonia rotundiloba
