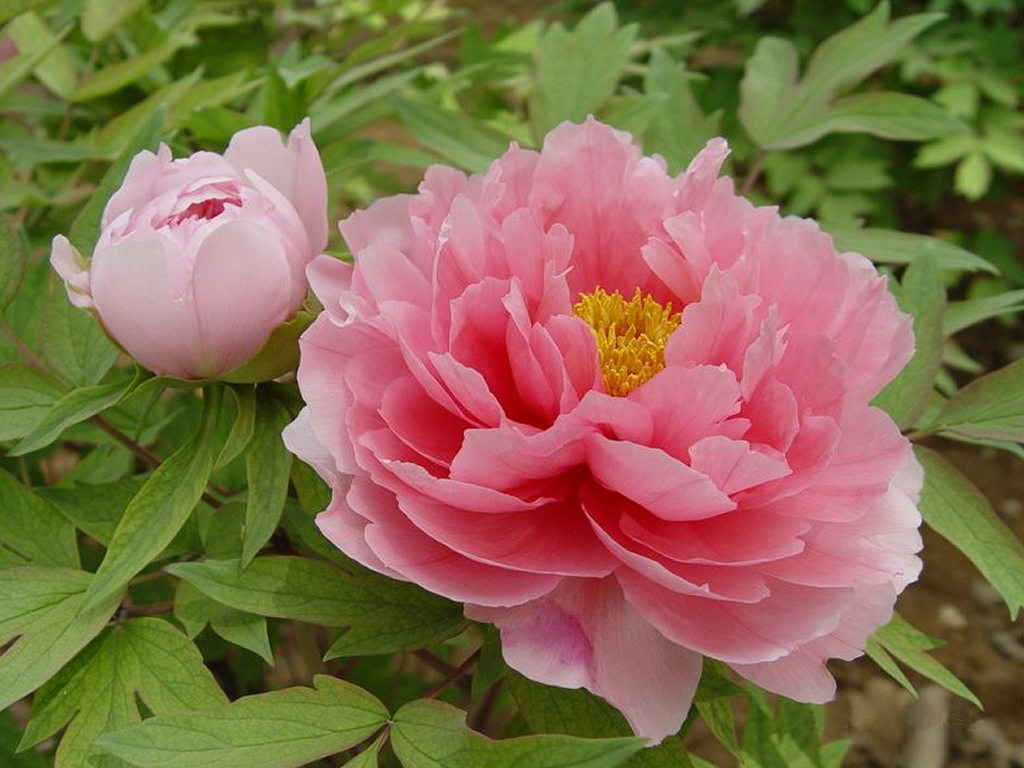

Scientific classification
- Kingdom: Plantae
- Clade: Tracheophytes
- Clade: Angiosperms
- Clade: Eudicots
- Order: Saxifragales
- Family: Paeoniaceae
- Genus: Paeonia
- Species: P. × suffruticosa

Binomial name
- Paeonia × suffruticosa Andrews

Synonyms
- Paeonia × moutan Sims

= Paeonia × suffruticosa =

Species of flowering plant

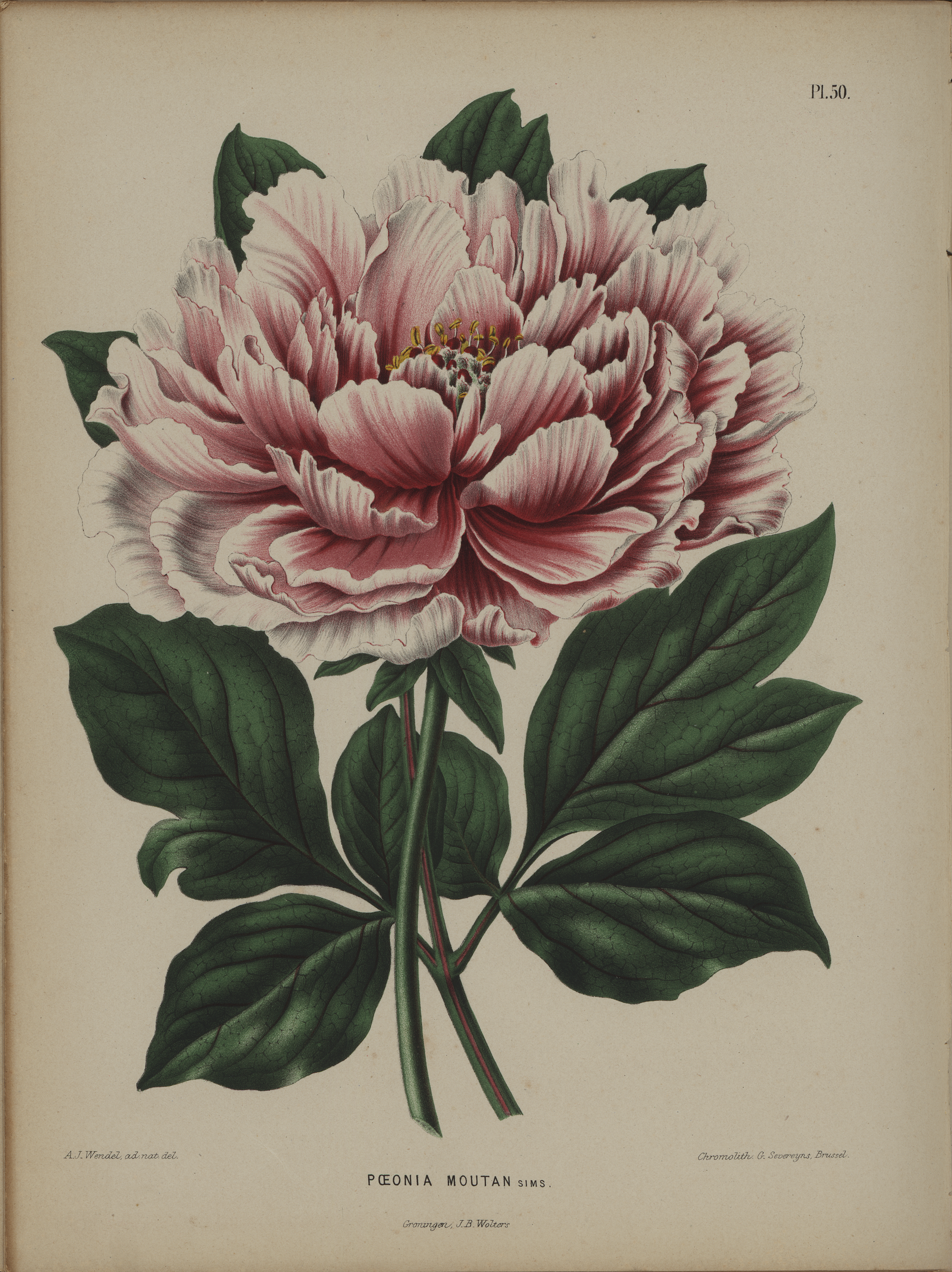
Paeonia suffruticosa (originally Paeonia Moutan Sims) by Abraham Jacobus Wendel, 1868

Paeonia × suffruticosa is a group of tree peony cultivars that are the result of hybridization with peony species exclusively belonging to the subsection Vaginatae. The common name used in China is mǔdān (Chinese: 牡丹) or Moutan peony. Cultivars of this group have been cultivated in Chinese floriculture for millennia, initially only as a source of traditional Chinese medicine, particularly for the skin of their roots (牡丹皮; mǔdān pí). Already early on, the plant was also cultivated for its ornamental value, and it is highly revered in Chinese culture.

Paeonia × suffruticosa is a perennial deciduous shrub with stems up to 2 m (6 ft 7 in); the branches are short and thick. leaves are usually green, pale green, sometimes white, about 5–11 cm (2.0–4.3 in) long. Flowers have petals of reddish purple, pink to white. Flowering occurs in May; fruiting in June.

== Genetic analysis ==
Paeonia × suffruticosa is the name used for most tree peony cultivars, but is not a naturally occurring species, so it can be regarded as the name for a man-made hybrid swarm. Genetic analysis has shown that five species of the subsection Vaginatae together make up the parentage of the tree peony cultivars created before World War II.

In over three quarters of the almost fifty studied cultivars, the DNA of their chloroplasts is identical to those in Paeonia cathayana, indicating that this species is the original maternal parent. Almost all of the remaining cultivars have chloroplast DNA identical to that in P. qiui, and rarely from P. ostii and partially from Paeonia rotundiloba. In the nuclear DNA however, homology with Paeonia rockii is largest, with lesser contributions from P. qiui, P. ostii, P. cathayana and P. jishanensis. Paeonia decomposita is the only species from the Vaginatae that has not contributed to these cultivars.

=== Lemoine hybrids ===
Crossbreeding of yellow-flowered P. delavayi with traditional double-flowered P. × suffruticosa cultivars by Victor Lemoine in Nancy has led to the introduction of the color yellow into the cultivated double-flowered tree-peonies. These hybrids are known as the Paeonia × lemoinei group, and include double-flowered 'Chromatella' (1928), 'Alice Harding' (1935) and semidouble-flowered 'Sang Lorraine' (1939). The semi-double, lemon-yellow P. × lemoinei cultivar 'High Noon' has gained the Royal Horticultural Society's Award of Garden Merit.

=== Itoh cultivars ===
In 1948 horticultulturist Toichi Itoh from Tokyo used pollen from 'Alice Harding' to fertilize the herbaceous P. lactiflora 'Katoden', which resulted in a new category of peonies, the Itoh or intersectional cultivars. These are herbaceous, have leaves like tree peonies, with many large flowers from late spring to early summer, and good peony wilt resistance. Some of the early Itoh cultivars are 'Yellow Crown', 'Yellow Dream', 'Yellow Emperor' and 'Yellow Heaven'.

Cultivated hybrid tree peonies originate from China and its surrounding areas, possessing significant cultural meaning throughout Chinese history. Currently there are about 600 Chinese tree peony cultivars. Since their introduction abroad, a few unique cultivar groups have been bred in France, Britain, the United States, and some other countries. This species is less common in U.S., but it can generally be found in plant nurseries.

== Comparison with other peonies ==
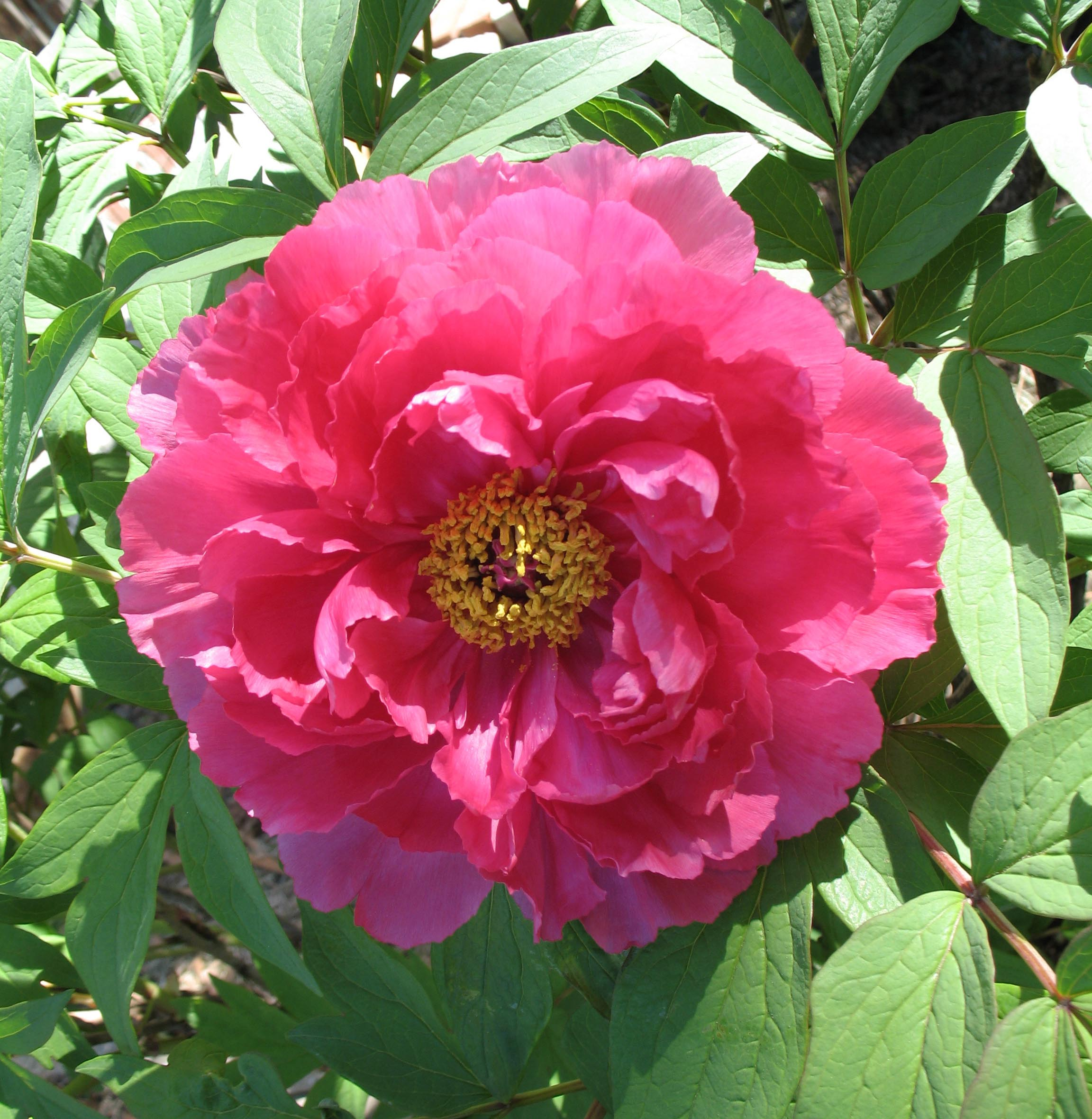
A flower of a tree peony in a garden in Queens, New York City, May of 2007

Paeonia × suffruticosa, also known as the tree peony, originates from China. Sometimes, people refer to these tree peonies as "Chinese tree peonies".

Paeonia × suffruticosa belongs to the peony family. The most distinctive feature is that Paeonia × suffruticosa is a bush or a tree, whereas most peonies are herbaceous. Despite their classification as trees, it is the flowers that attract people's attention. Peonies are generally slow to grow, and have flowers that only last briefly and are fragile under weather conditions such as wind, rain or hot temperatures.

In comparison, Paeonia × suffruticosa, as a tree, survives longer than the rest of the peonies. The woody stems of tree peonies allow the plant to survive in winter. In general, the plant is long-lived, and the flowers bloom longer in the early spring.

== Etymology of scientific name ==
The name Paeonia × suffruticosa is derived from two different sources. The genus name Paeonia derives from the name Paeon. In Greek mythology, Paeon was a disciple of the god of medicine, Asclepius. The species name "suffruticosa" is composed of two parts. The first part "suf-" is only a prefix; the second part "fruticosa", means shrub-like.

== Cultivation ==
In order to propagate the bush, the seeds are collected in June when the seed pods split. They are air-dried for a few days and then stored in moist soil before planting out during autumn. If the pods are fully dried out, it is more difficult for the seeds to sprout. Seeds that are harvested late or allowed to dry completely will not produce roots until the following spring, and then do not send up shoots for another year. Ideally, the plant should be planted in fertile, humus-rich soil with plenty of organic matter (in USDA zones 3 to 8).

Paeonia × suffruticosa grows in both full sun to dappled shade. However, the plant blooms best in dappled shade with 3 to 4 hours of sunlight. When grown in full sun, it is essential to provide adequate moisture to the plant. Generally, the tree requires very little pruning, but it is necessary to cut off dead branches, and to cut off any sprouts that are suckers from the herbaceous root stock.

Potential cultivating diseases include Ca. Phytoplasma solani, the causal agent of the Black wood disease of grapevine. This is associated with tree peony yellowing disease in China.

== Significance in Chinese culture ==
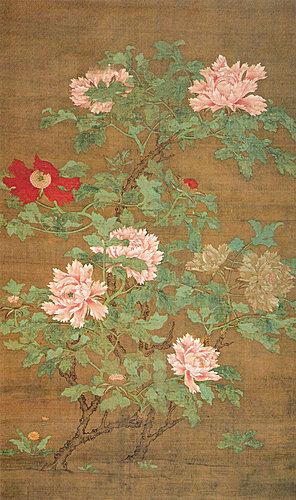
Tree Peony by Zhao Chang

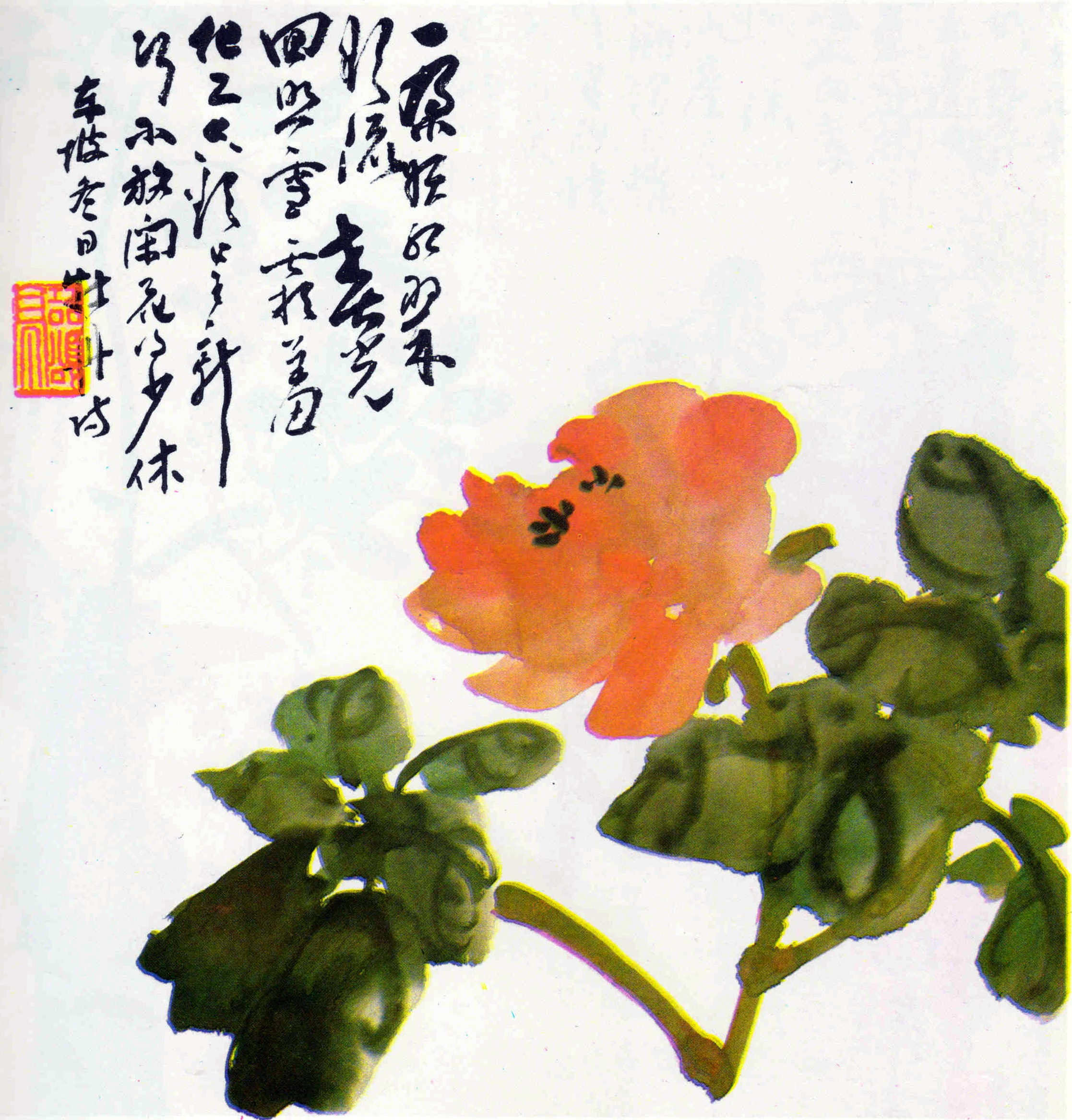
Mudan by Chen Shizeng

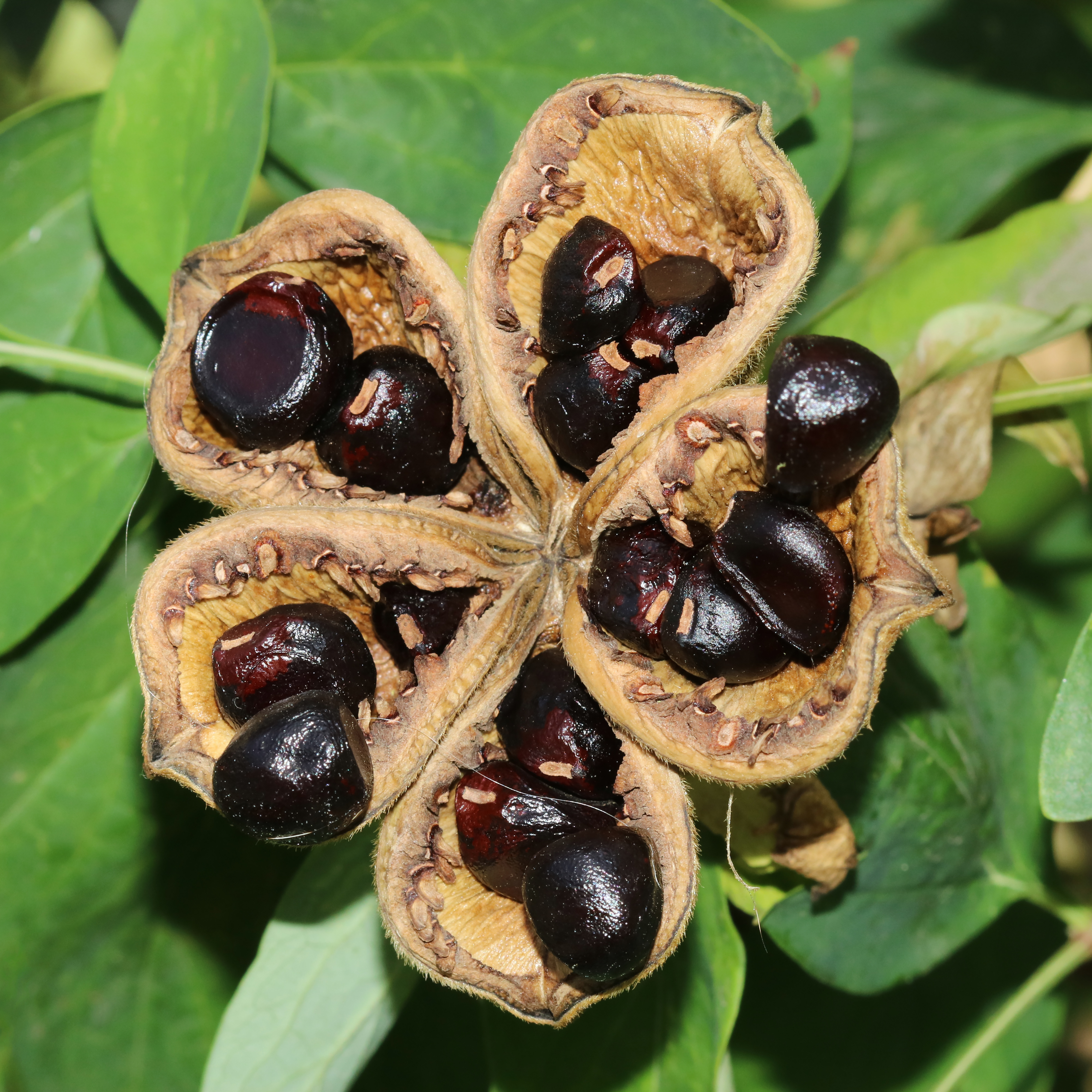
Ripe fruit with seeds

The peony is native to the northwest of China, with abundant wild populations in the Qinling Mountains and the mountainous areas of northern Shaanxi. It has a long history of cultivation and became an ornamental plant during the Northern and Southern Dynasties. Heze , historically known as Caozhou, is the capital of peony in China and has enjoyed the reputation of "Caozhou peony is the best in the world" since ancient times. According to "The Peony Catalogue of Caonan," "by the Ming Dynasty, the Caonan peony was the best in the country." Pu Songling wrote in "Liaozhai Zhiyi·Gejin Yuban" that "Caozhou peony is the best in Qilu." Heze has a long history of cultivating peonies, which began in the Sui Dynasty, flourished in the Tang and Song Dynasties, and reached its peak in the Ming and Qing Dynasties, with a history of more than 1,500 years. Heze boasts a wide variety of peonies, with ornamental peonies featuring 9 major color series, 10 major flower shapes, and 1,308 varieties. The number of new varieties cultivated accounts for 80% of China's total, and they are renowned for their large flowers, beautiful shapes, and vibrant colors. The planting area has reached 486,000 mu, making Heze the world's largest peony production, scientific research, export base, and ornamental tourism area with the most varieties and complete flower colors. It is also a national high-tech industrial base for peonies. Paeonia × suffruticosa has always had an important status in both Chinese politics and culture. During the Qing Dynasty (1644 -1911), the government in 1903 appointed Paeonia × suffruticosa as China's national flower. However, with political shifts and other factors, its title as the national flower was later replaced. In 1929, the plum tree was granted the title of national flower by the Republic of China (the government at the time).

Despite its loss of status of being the national flower, Paeonia × suffruticosa maintains cultural significance. In China, it is generally known as the "king of flowers", symbolizing honor, wealth, and aristocracy, as well as love, affection, and feminine beauty. The tree peony has been frequently portrayed in significant Chinese works of literature and art.

== China's debate on the national flower ==
In the late Qing Dynasty, peony was regarded as the national flower of China.

Elections for the national tree and national flower were held in the 1980s and 1994, but both elections ended with no final conclusion. Prior to the 2008 Beijing Olympics and 2010 Shanghai World Expo, the Chinese government again attempted to determine a national flower. Many Chinese citizens suggested copying the practices of countries such as France, Japan, and Thailand, by selecting two national flowers. 62 scholars from the Chinese Academy of Sciences and the Chinese Academy of Engineering have proposed a "dual national flower" plan to name both Paeonia × suffruticosa and plum blossom to the position.

With the Olympics and Expo approaching, the ongoing uncertainty over choosing a national flower led to the Chinese government publishing The Recommendation Concerning Setting the Peony and Plum Blossom as National Flowers as Early as Possible. The Recommendation pointed out that the lack of a flower was hindering the expansion of China's flower culture and industry. This proposal was only one of several potential plans; other plans included choosing one, four, or five national flowers.

The five flowers suggestion, known as "One Country, Five Flowers", proposed establishing Paeonia × suffruticosa as the primary national flower, with four supplementary flowers representing each season of the year: the chrysanthemum would represent autumn, the plum blossom would represent winter, the orchid would represent spring, and the lotus would represent summer. Despite the proposals, China was not able to make a decision before the Olympics and Expo. The decision remains hanging.

== As medicine ==
Paeonia × suffruticosa has a long history of being used in Chinese medicine. There are more than 1000 Chinese tree peony cultivars with various flower colors and flower forms that have been selected artificially for medicinal uses for more than 2000 years. The root bark, often referred to as Mu Dan Pi or Cortex Moutan, is the main part that is used in Chinese medicine. Mu Dan Pi's main functions include reducing heat, cooling the blood, improving liver function, and mildly invigorating the blood. Mu Dan Pi of the best quality should be very fragrant, thick, white and starchy. The flower is now mostly cultivated for medicinal uses. Due to over-harvesting, the wild plant is threatened with extinction.

== Chemistry ==
Paeonia × suffruticosa contains paeonol, galloyl-paeoniflorin, galloyl-oxypaeoniflorin, suffruticoside A, B, C, D and E.

== Gallery ==
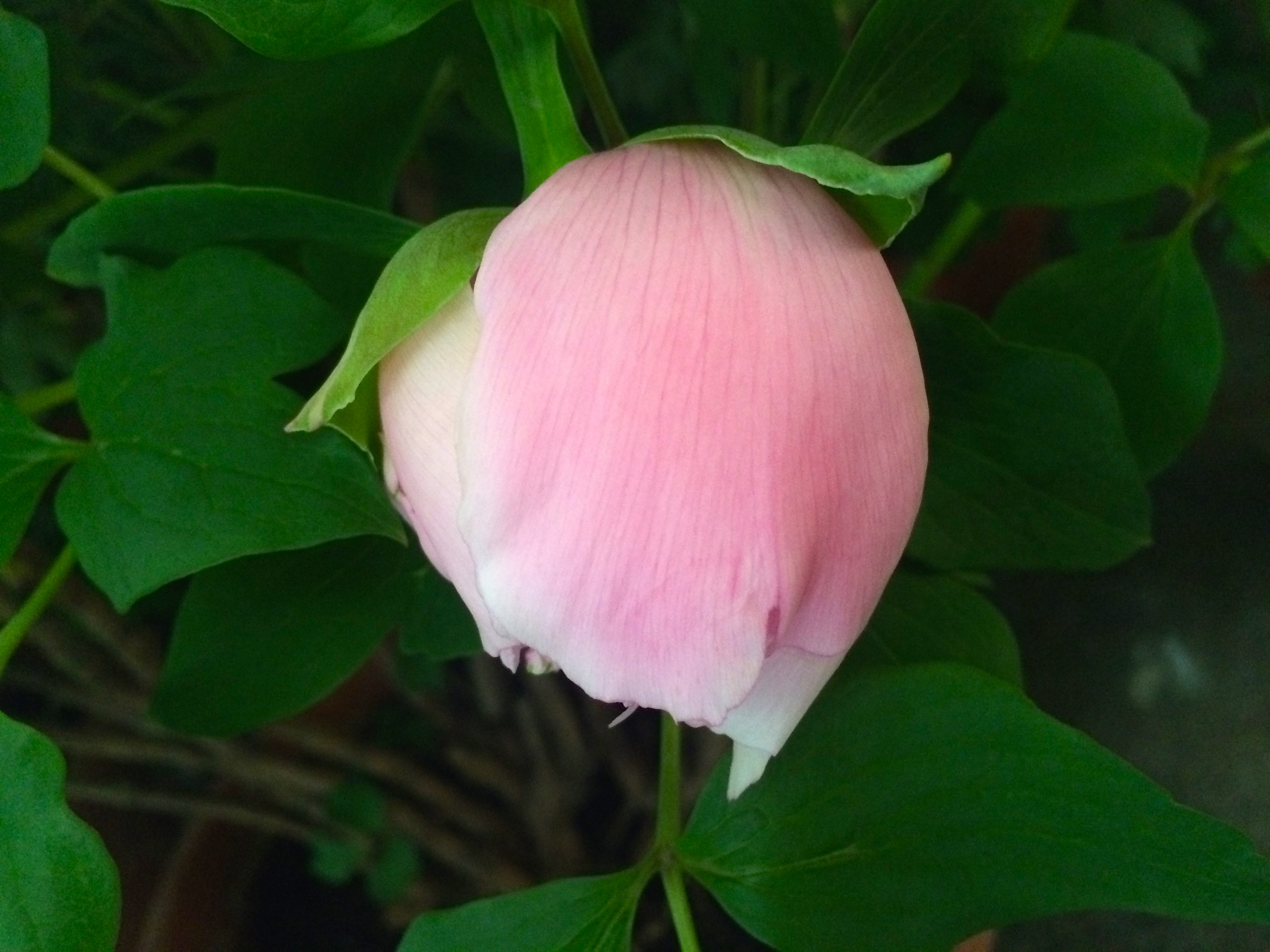

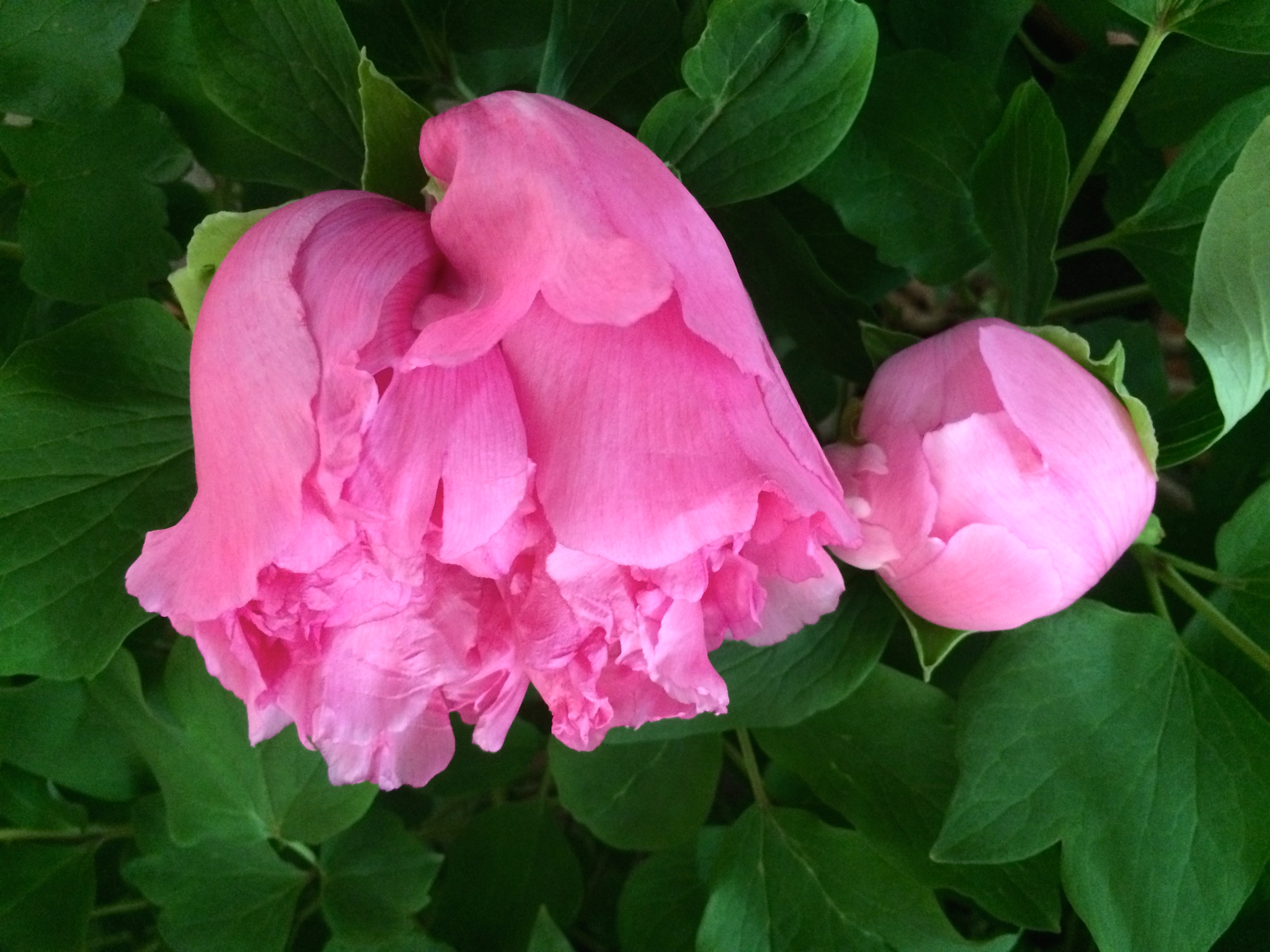

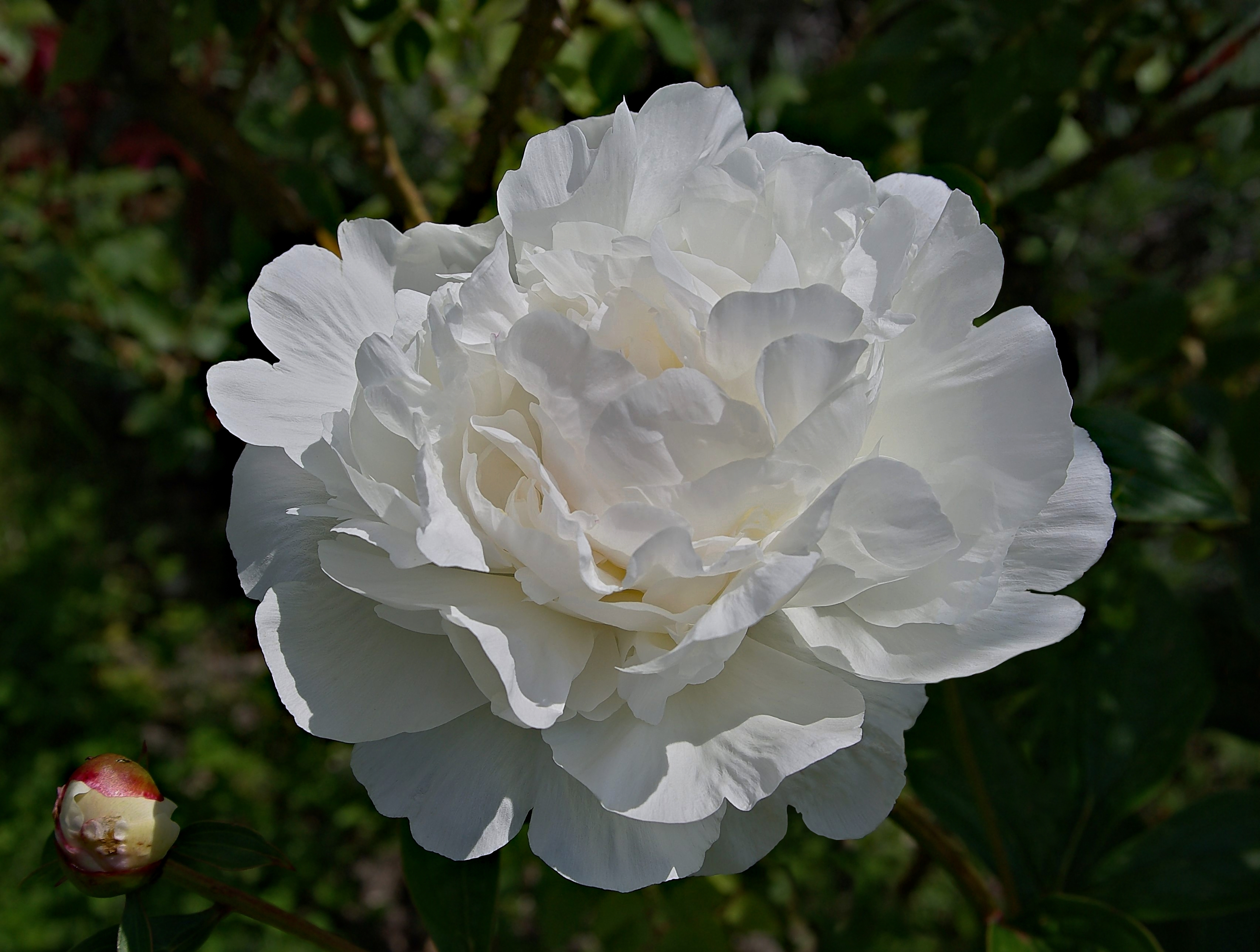

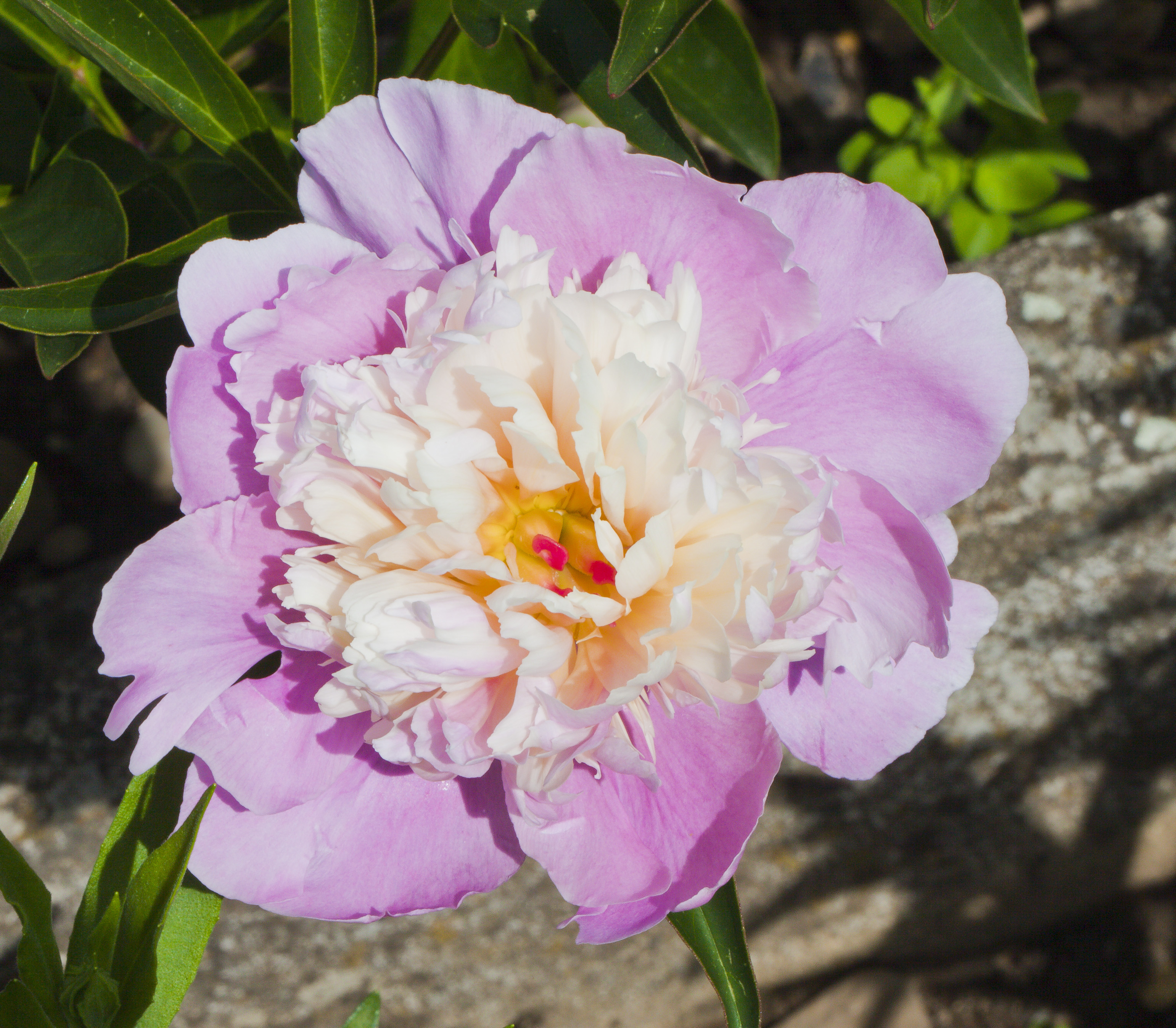

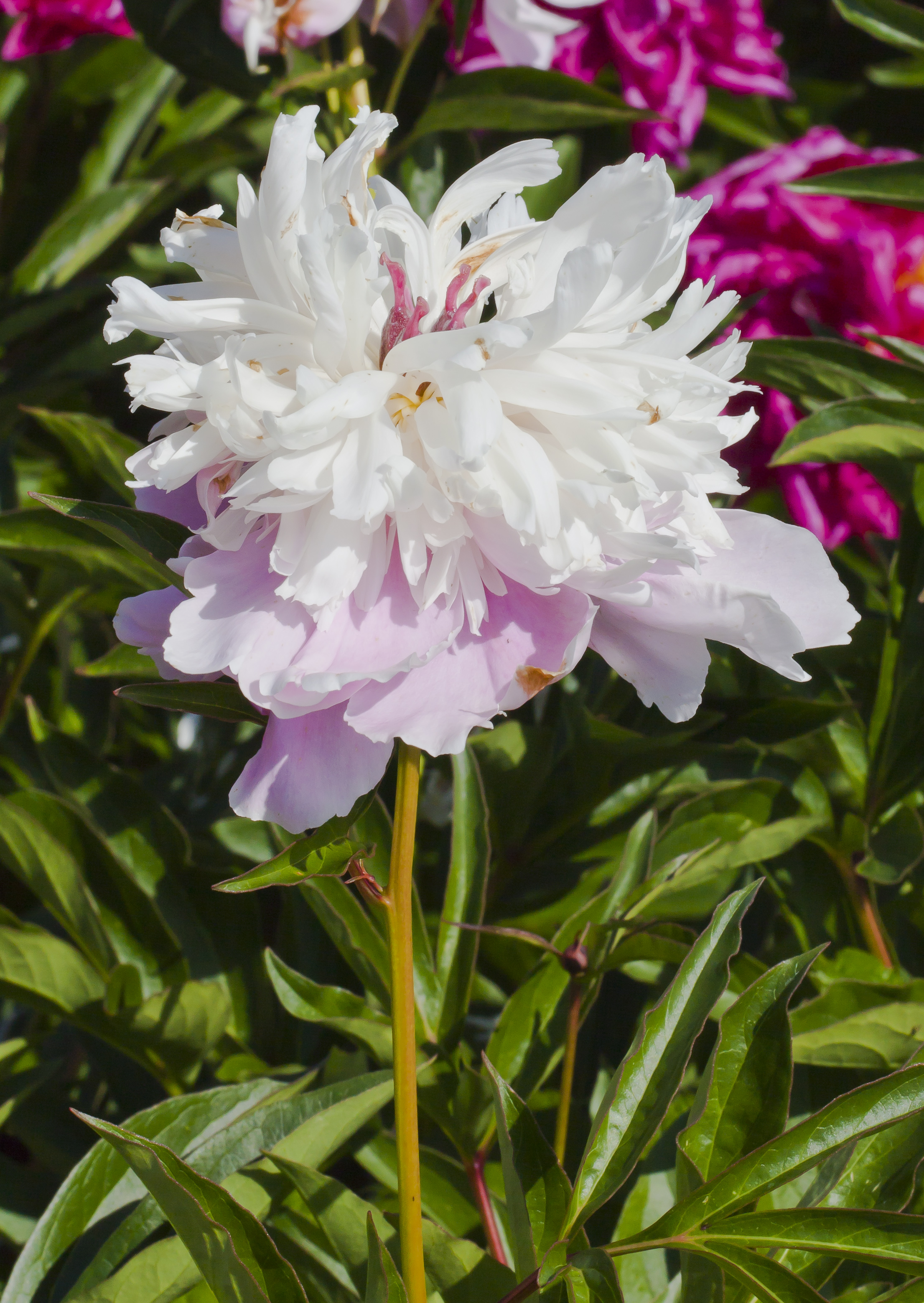

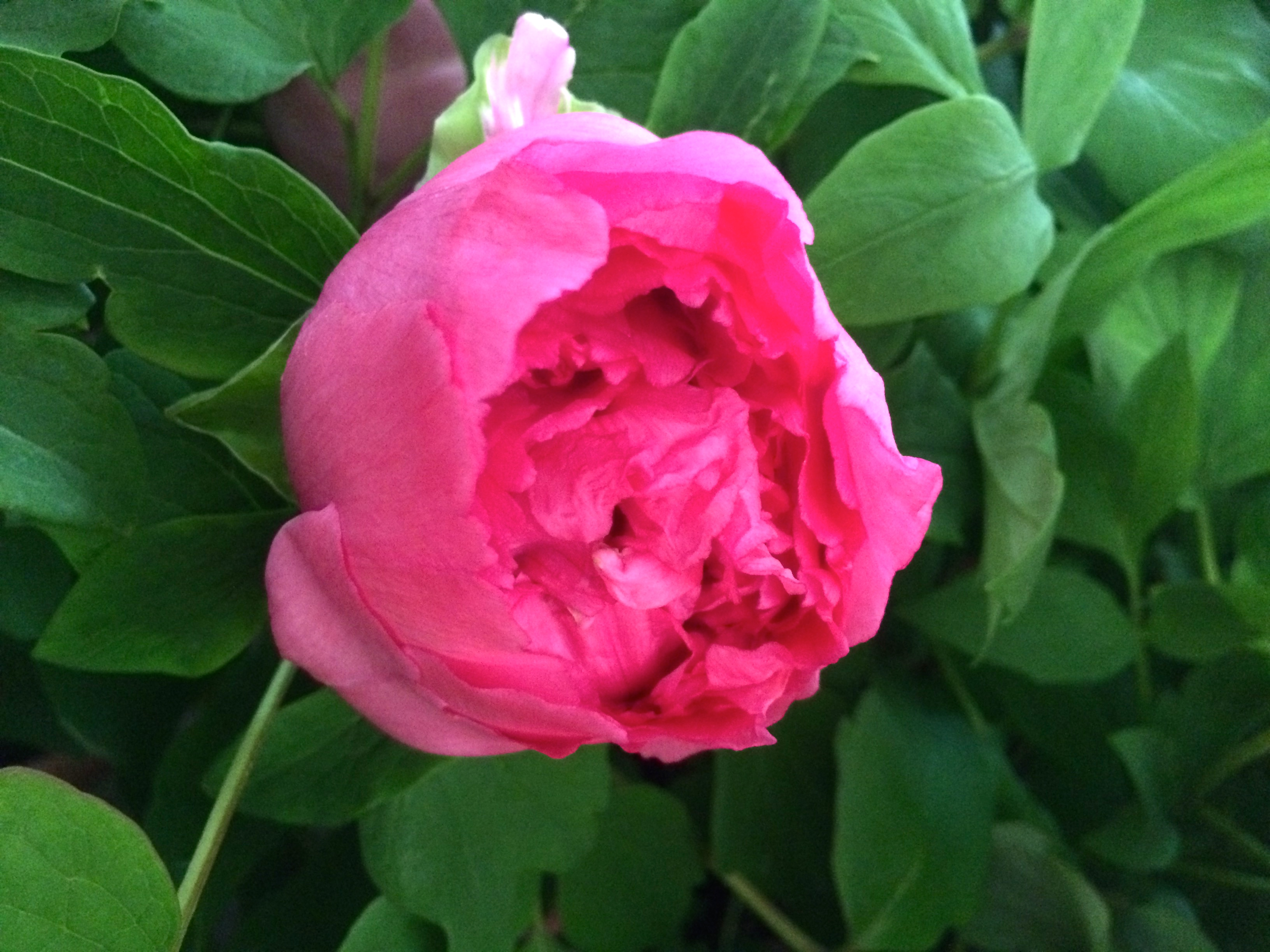

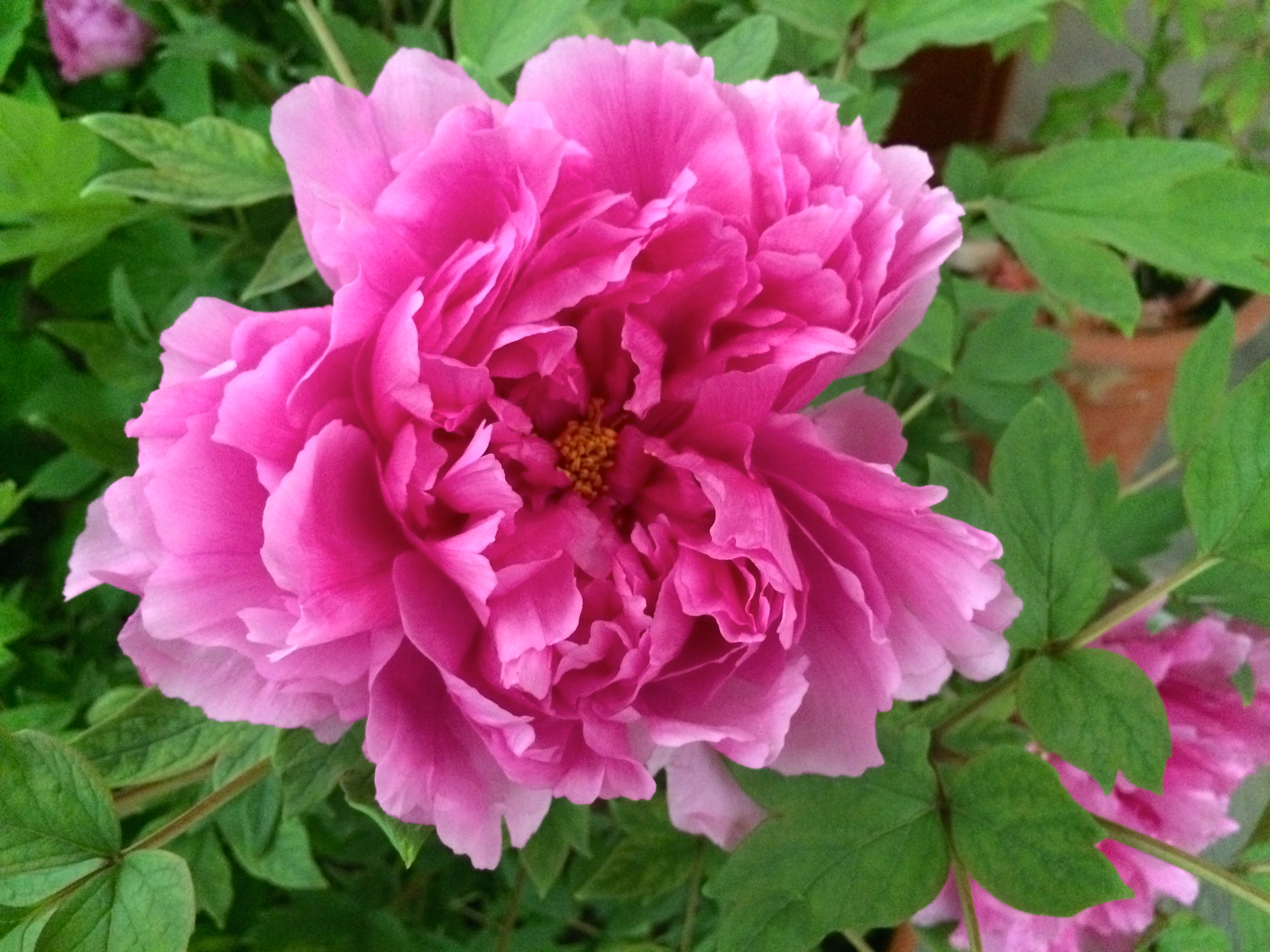

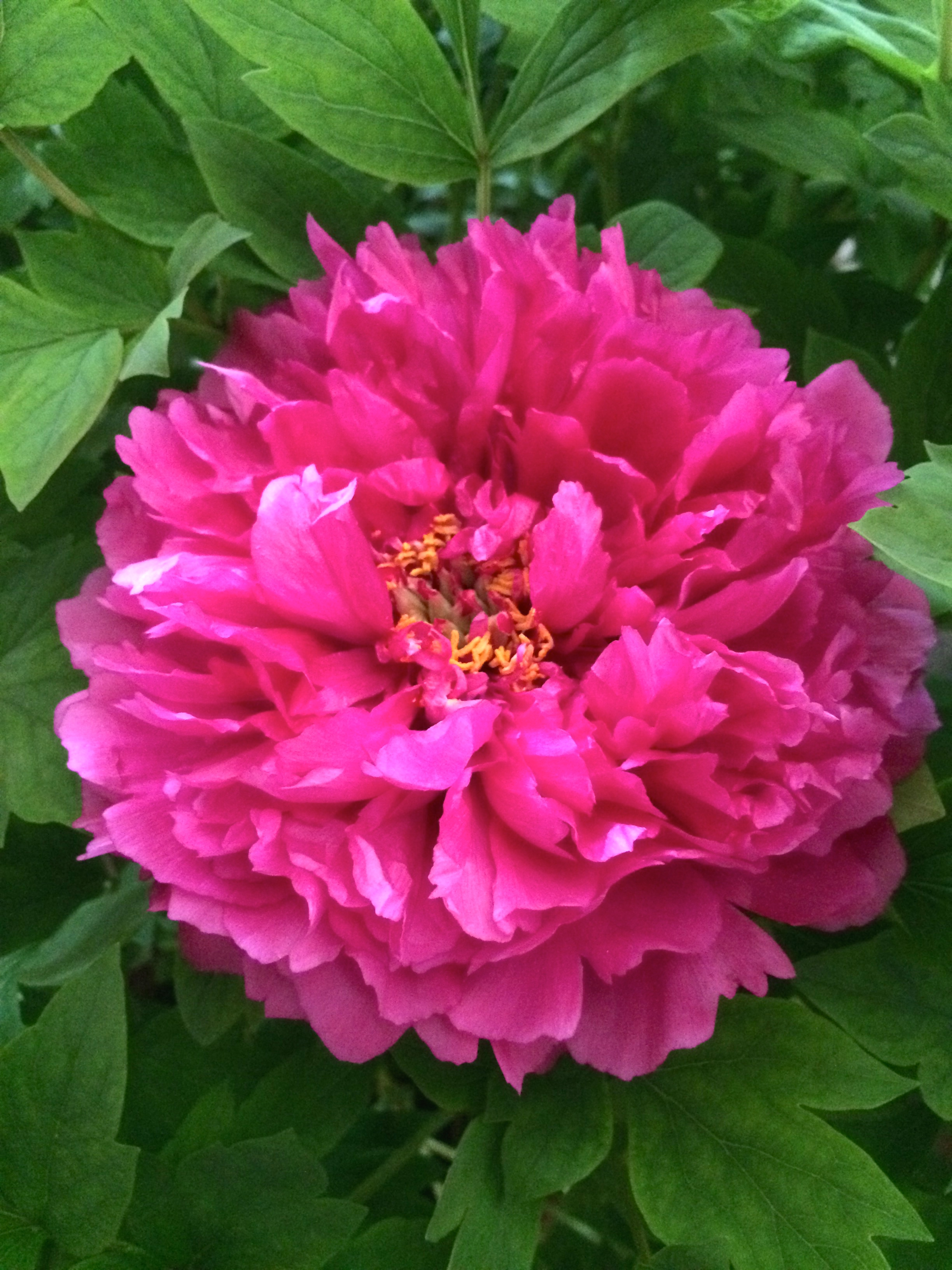

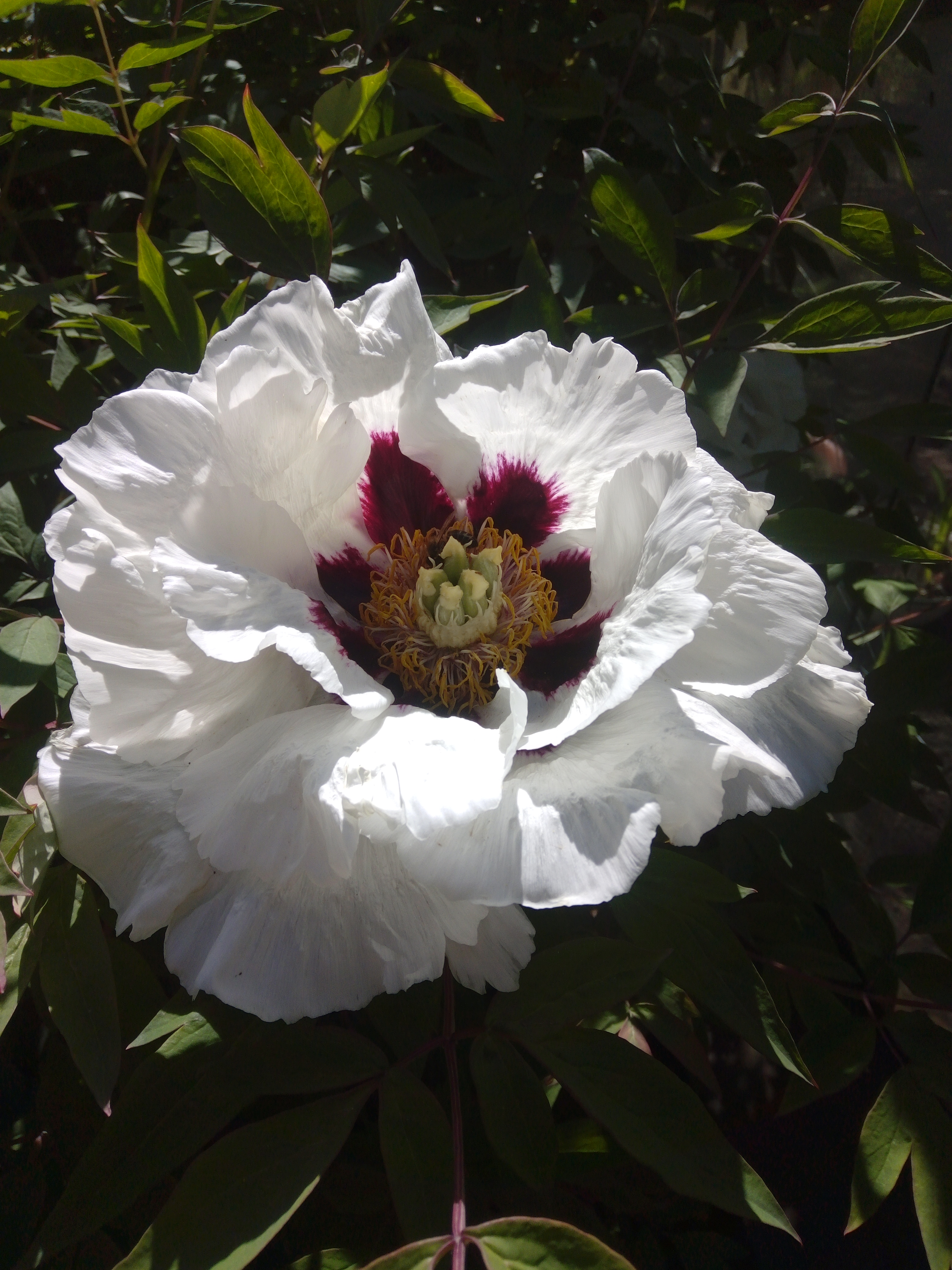

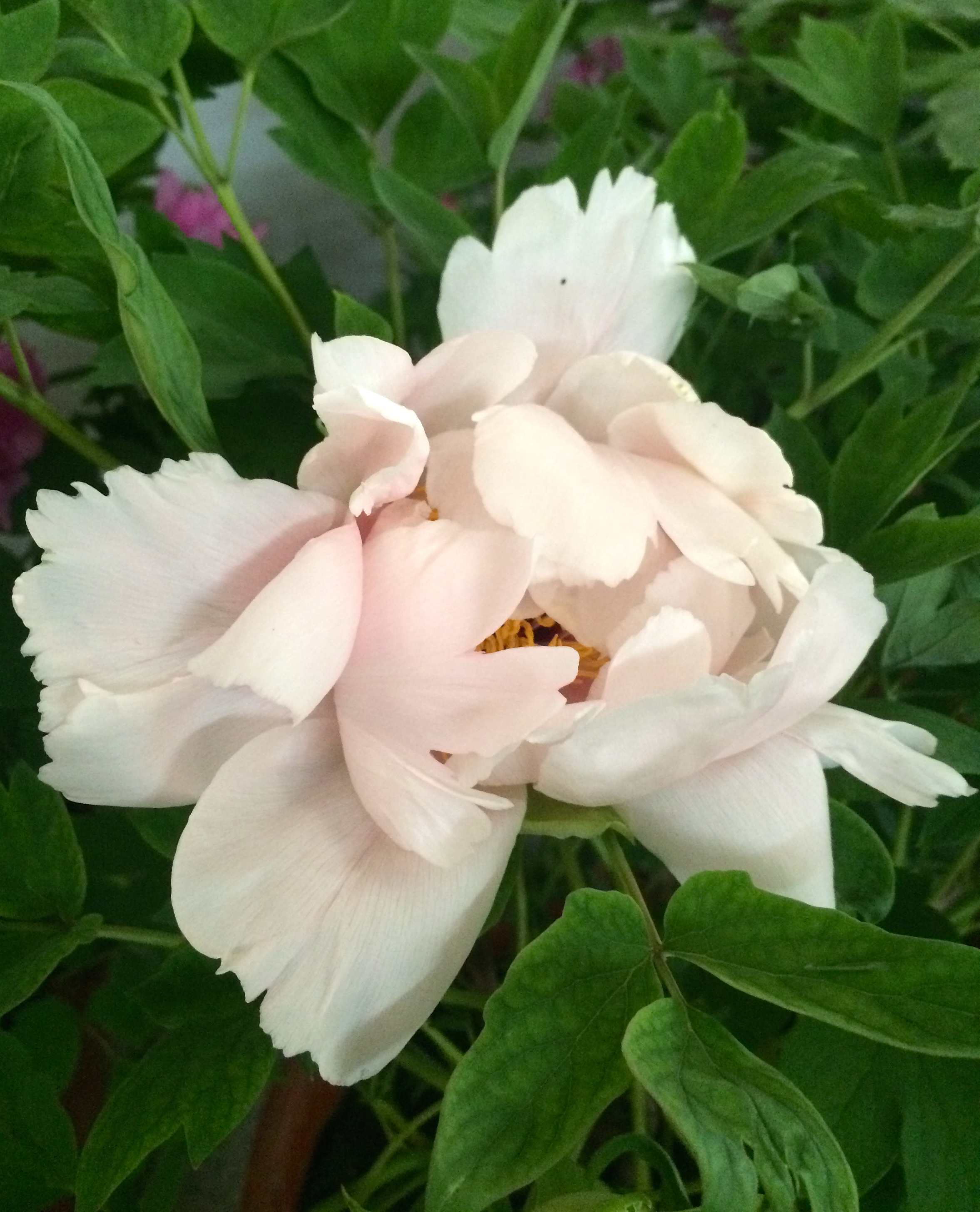

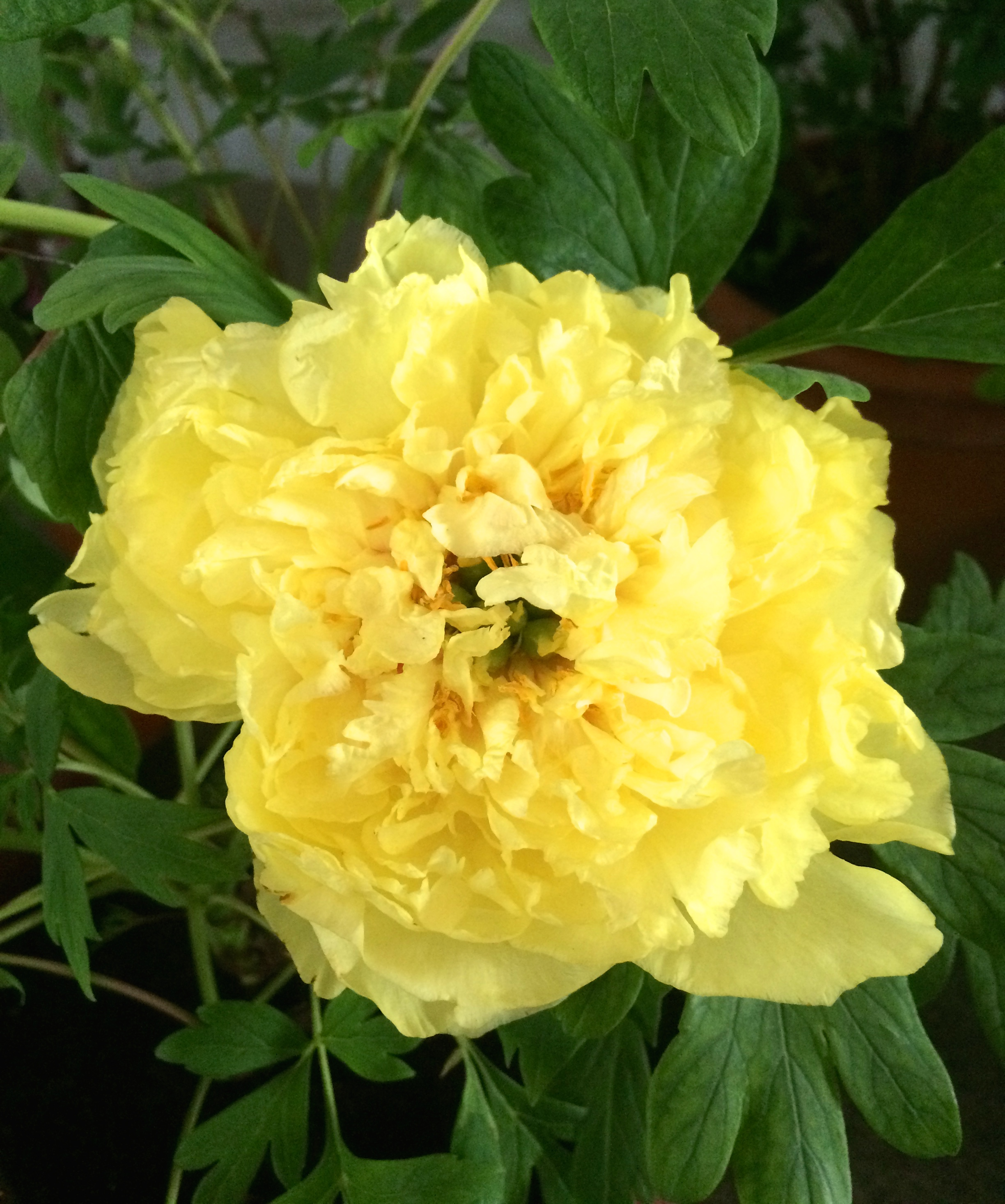

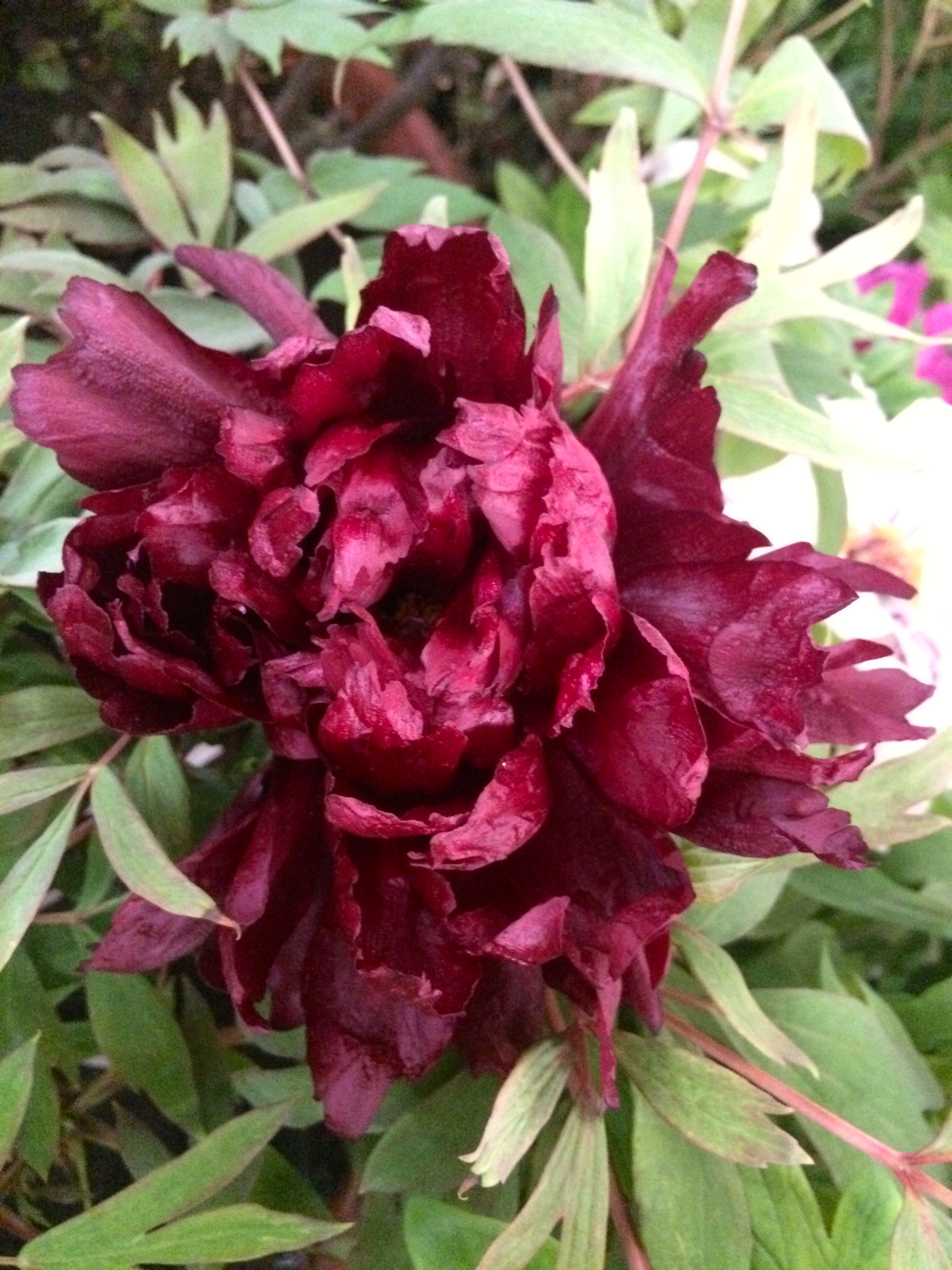

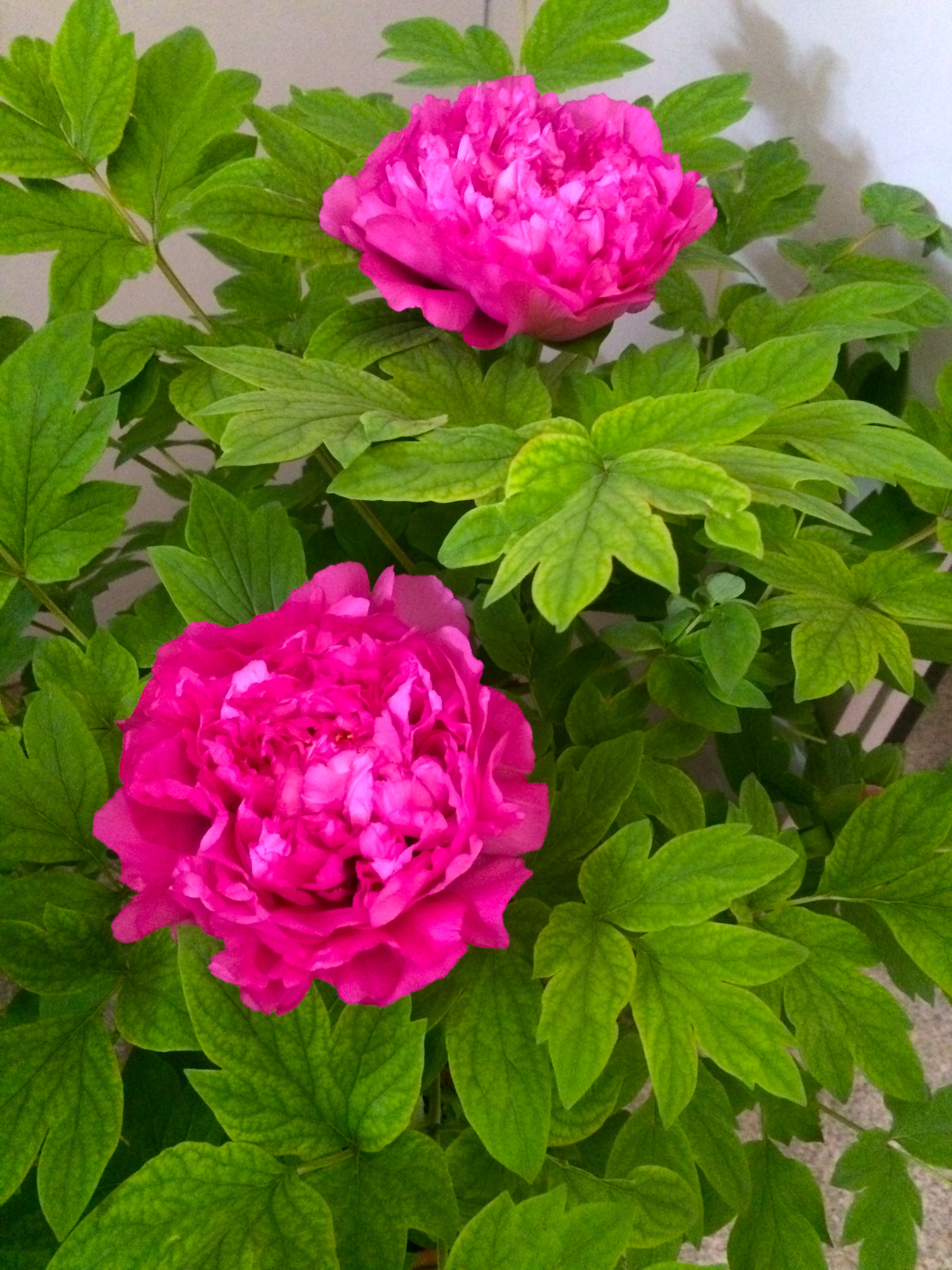

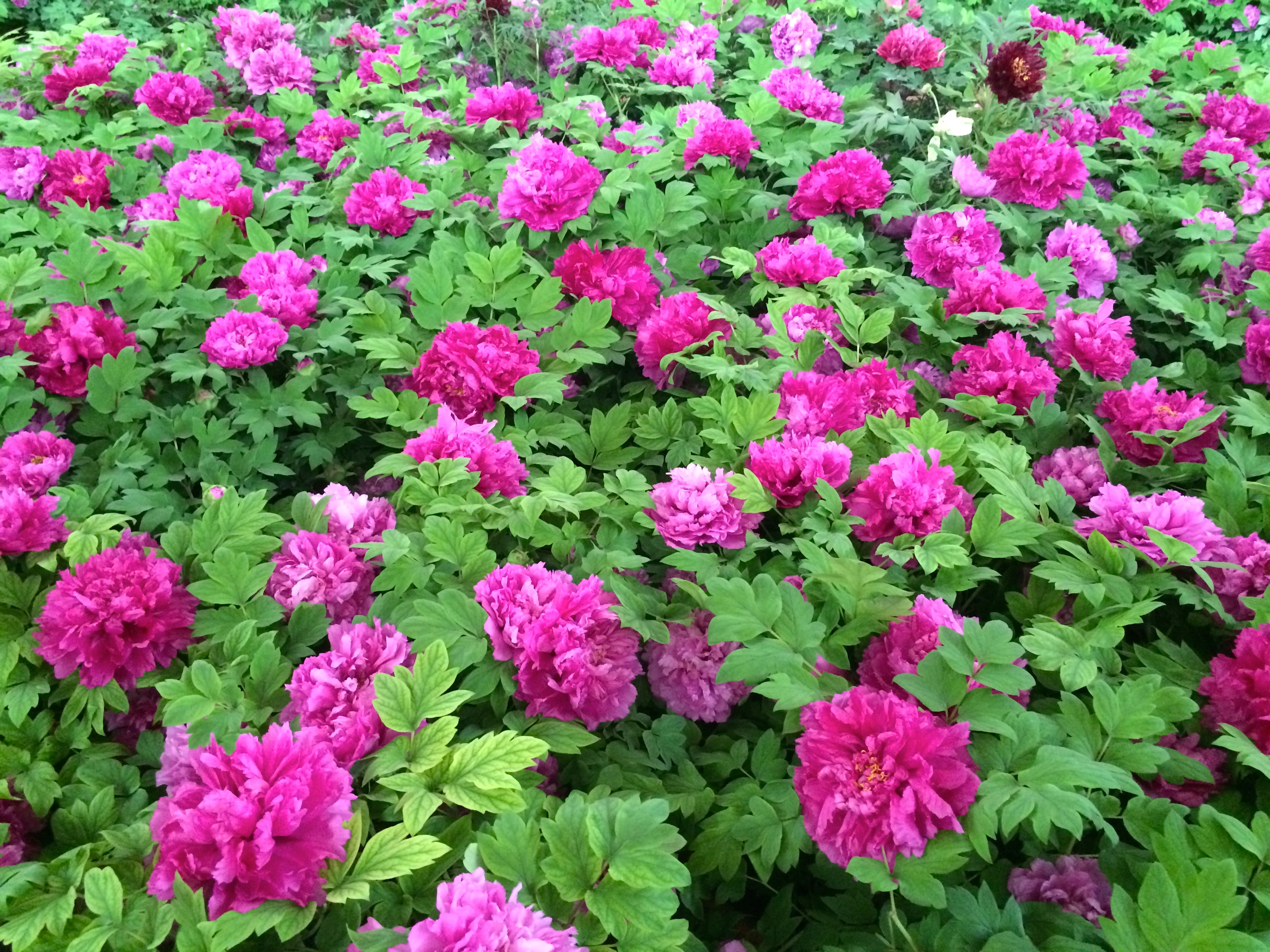

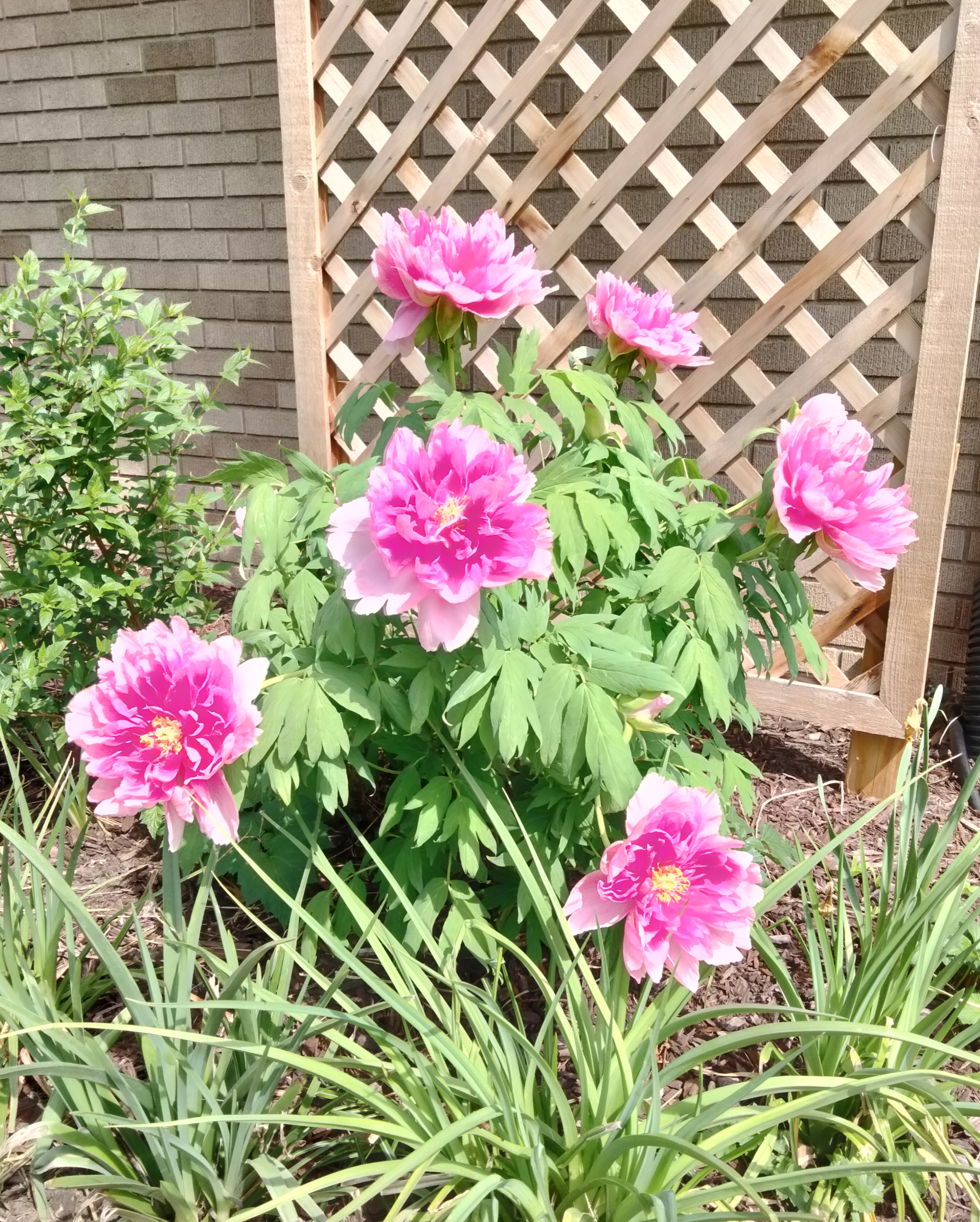
