= Follicle (fruit) =

Dry fruit which splits at a suture to release seeds from a single cavity

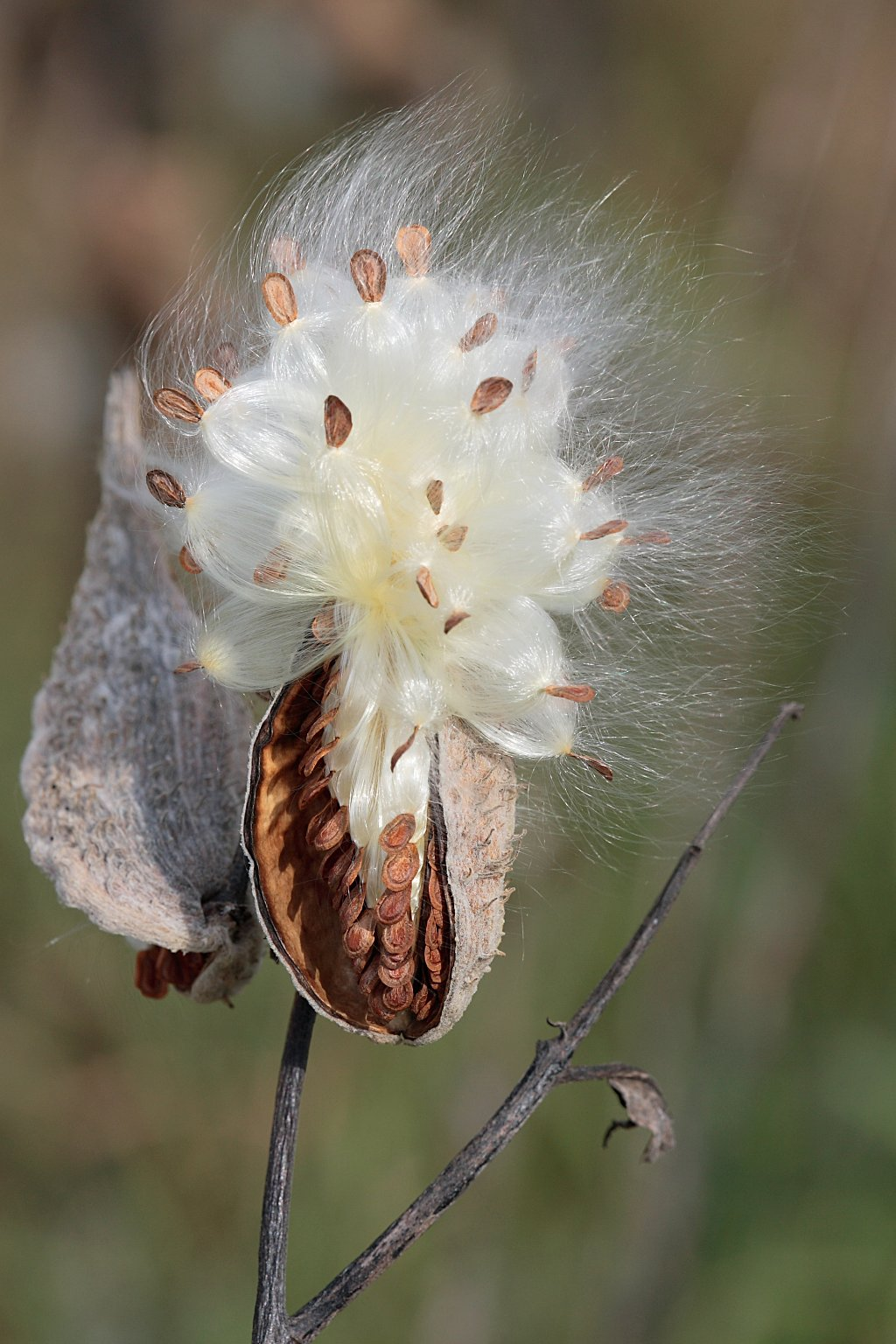
A milkweed follicle releasing its seeds.

In botany, a follicle is a dry one-chambered (unilocular) fruit formed from one carpel, containing two or more seeds. It is defined as splitting (dehiscing) along one side in order to release seeds. Examples are seen in Consolida, Asclepias and many species in the Proteaceae family.

Some difficult cases exist however, so that the term indehiscent follicle is sometimes used, for example with the genus Filipendula, which has indehiscent fruits that could be considered intermediate between a (dehiscent) follicle and an (indehiscent) achene.

An aggregate fruit that consists of follicles may be called a follicetum. Examples include hellebore, aconite, Delphinium, Aquilegia or the family Crassulaceae, where several follicles occur in a whorl on a shortened receptacle, or Magnolia, which has many follicles arranged in a spiral on an elongated receptacle.

The follicles of some species dehisce by the ventral suture (as in Banksia), or by the dorsal suture (as in Magnolia).

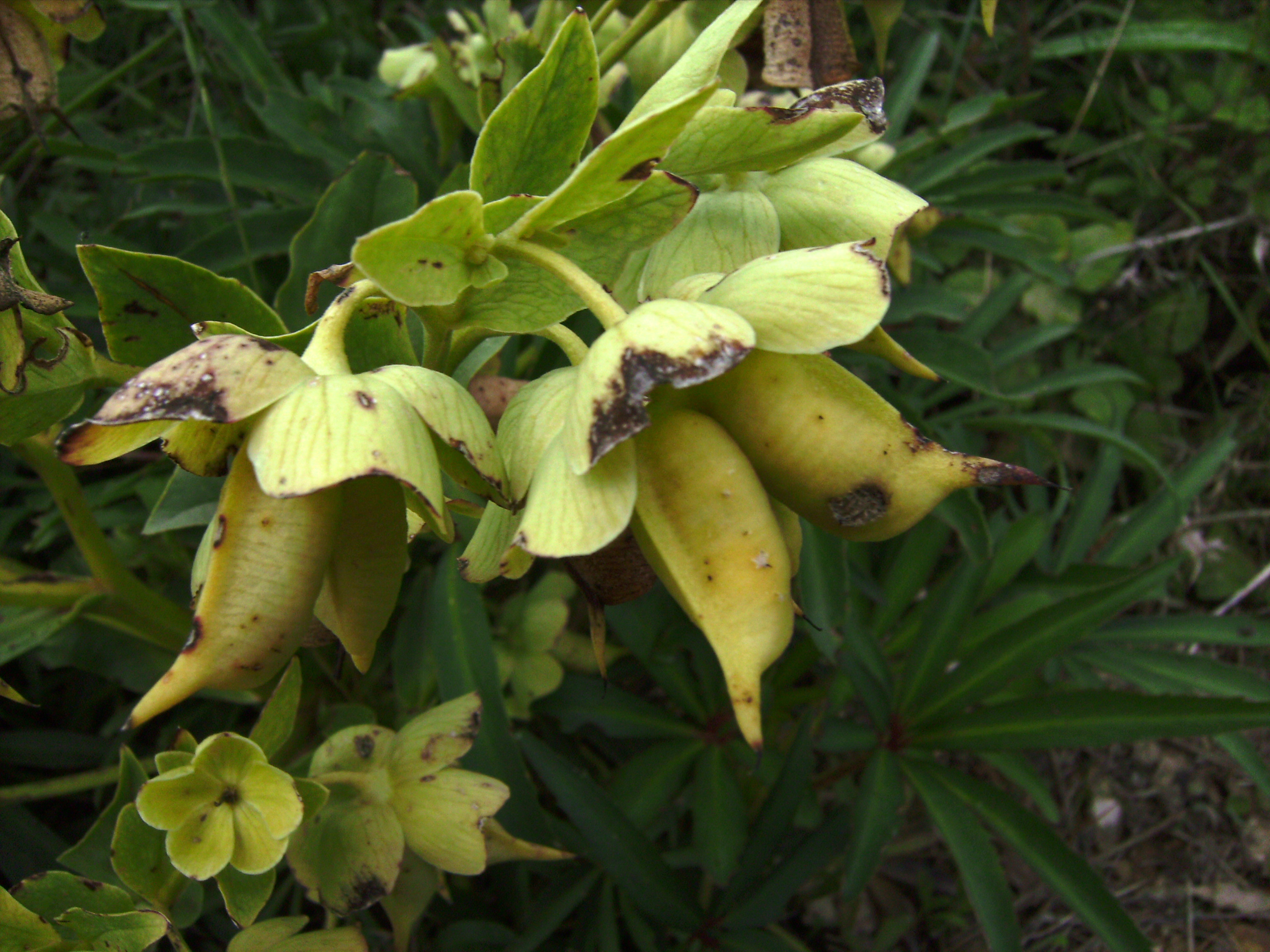
Follicles from Helleborus foetidus (Ranunculaceae)

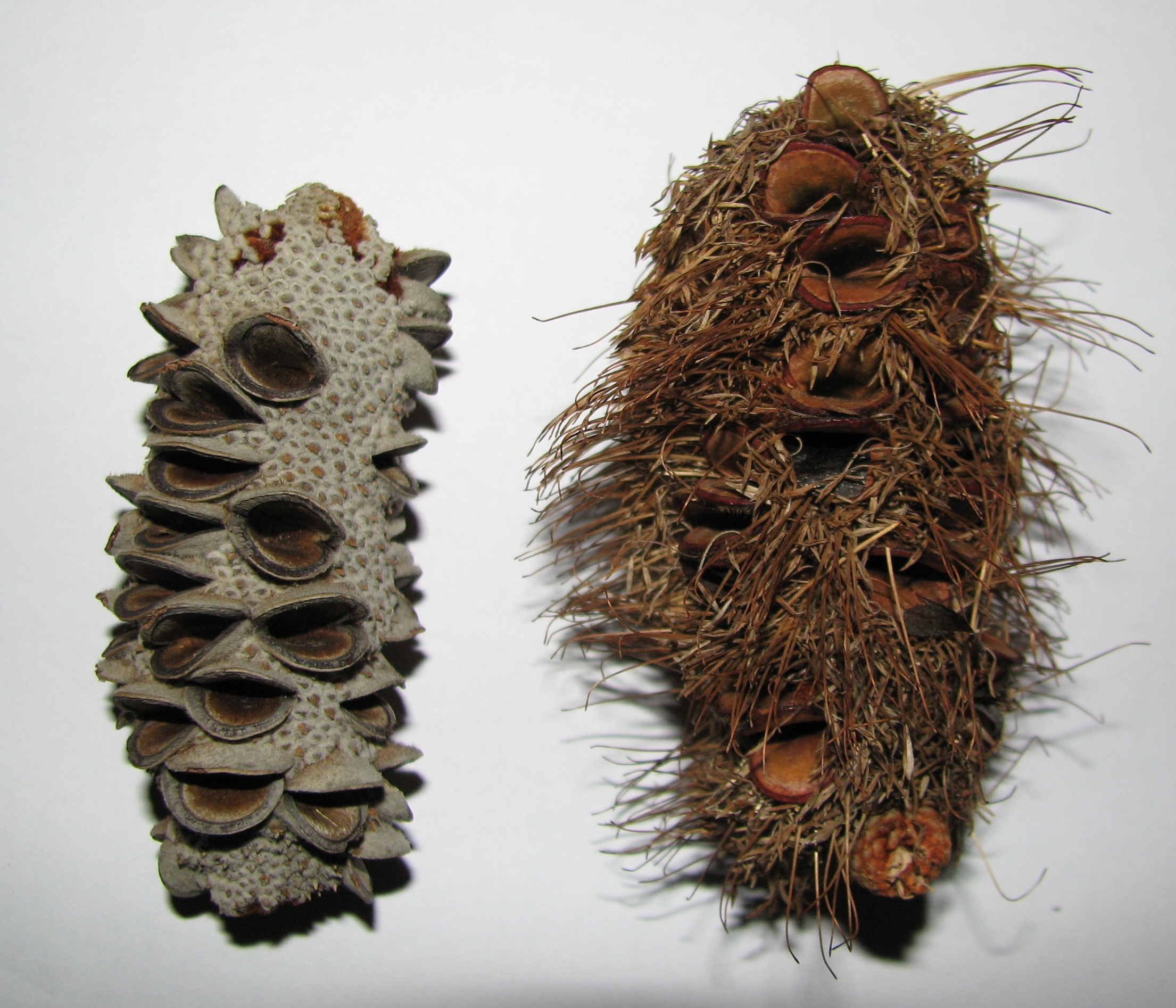
Only some flowers in a Banksia inflorescence mature into follicles embedded in the "cone"

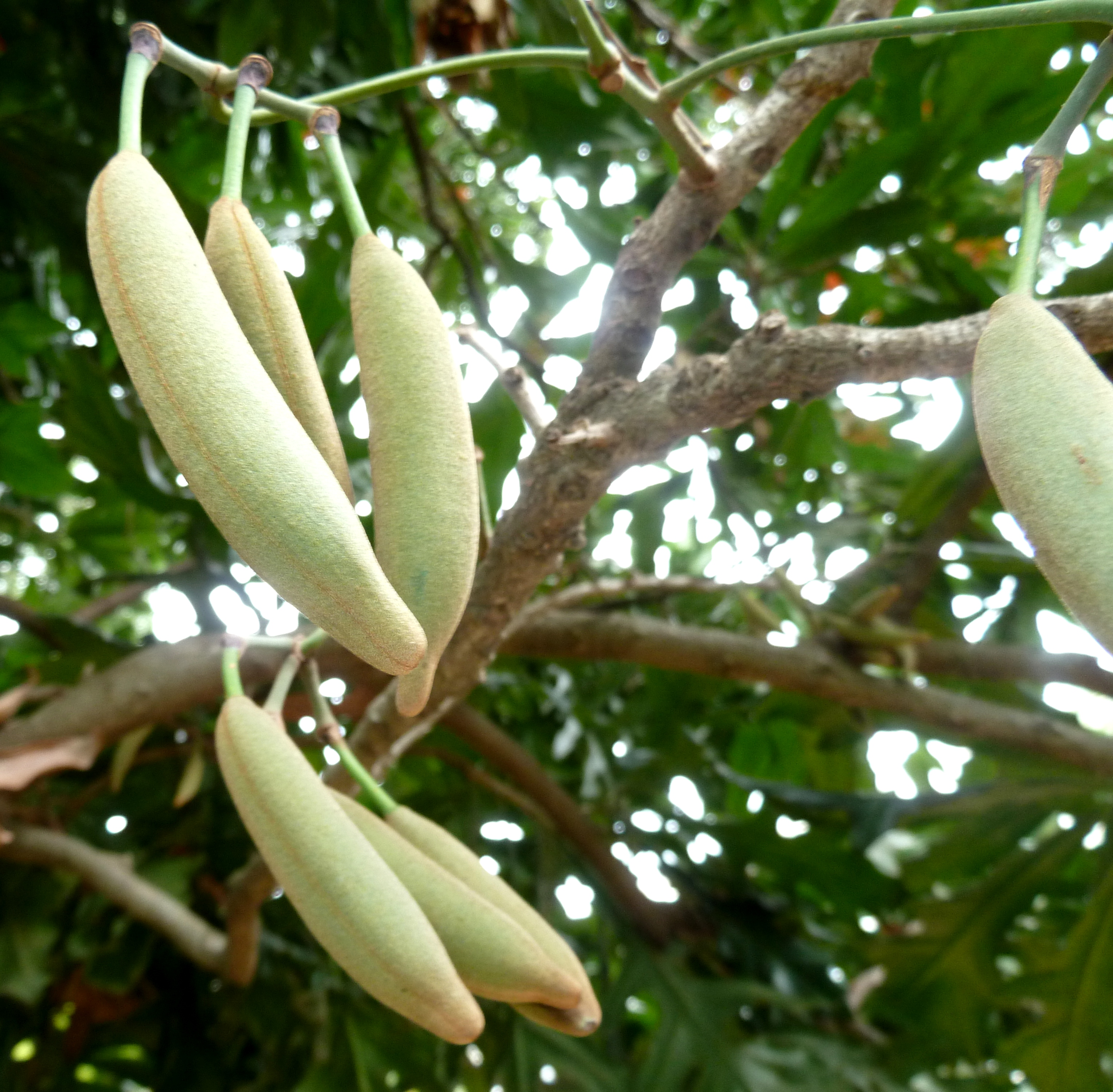
Follicles of Stenocarpus sinuatus (Proteaceae) will release papery brown seeds

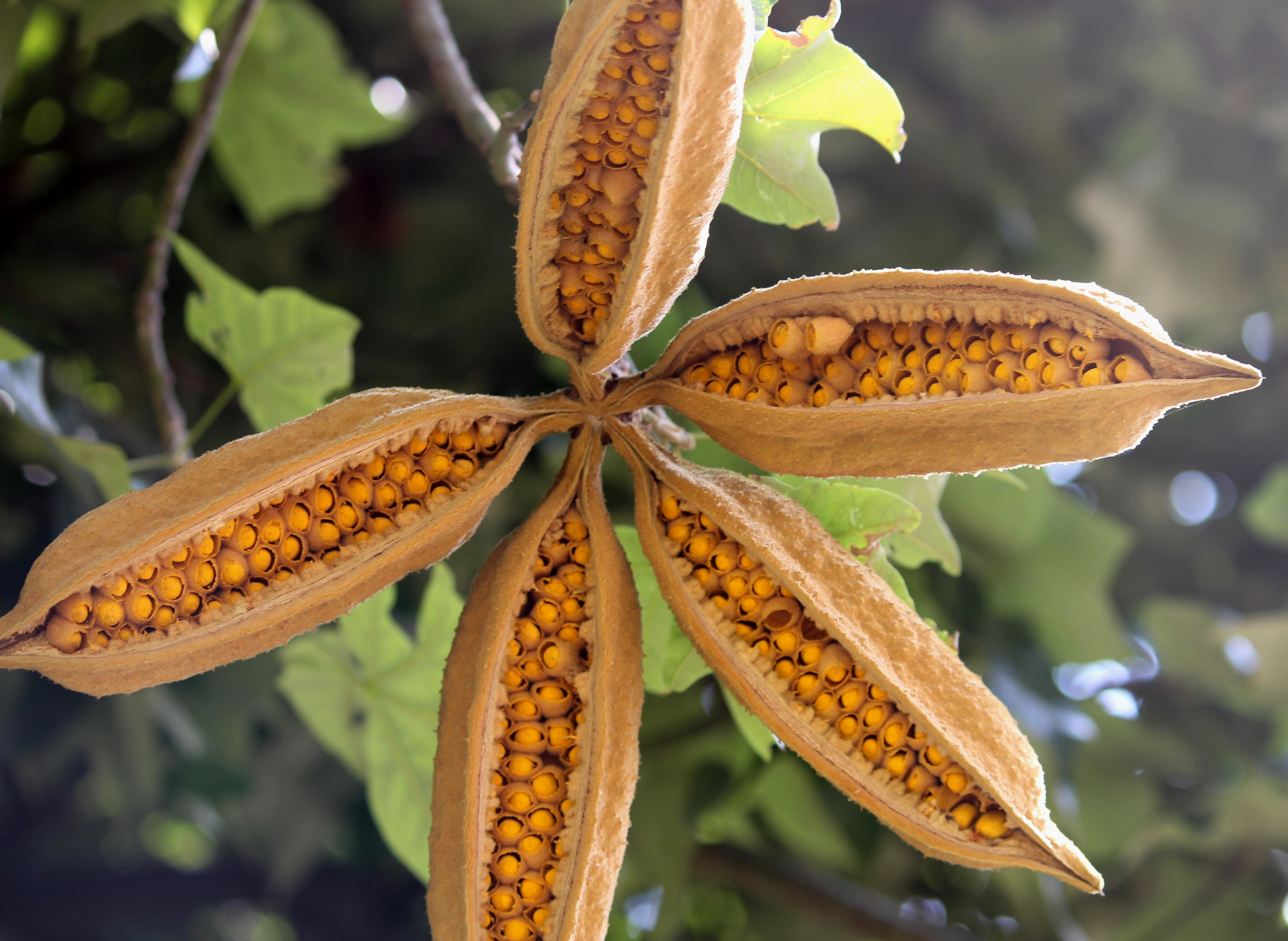
Five follicles in the monofloral aggregate fruit of Brachychiton discolor (Malvaceae).

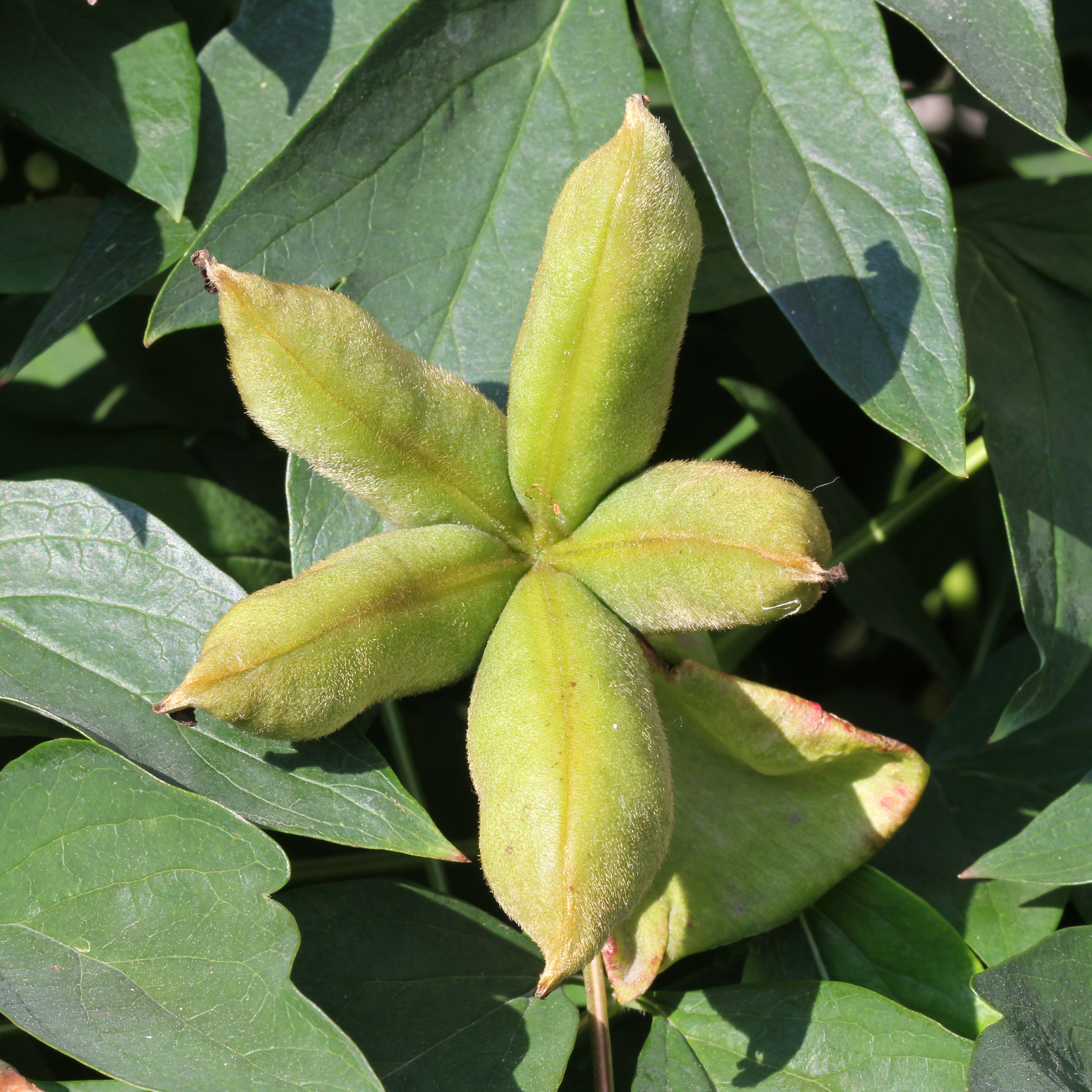
Five unripe follicles of Paeonia rockii

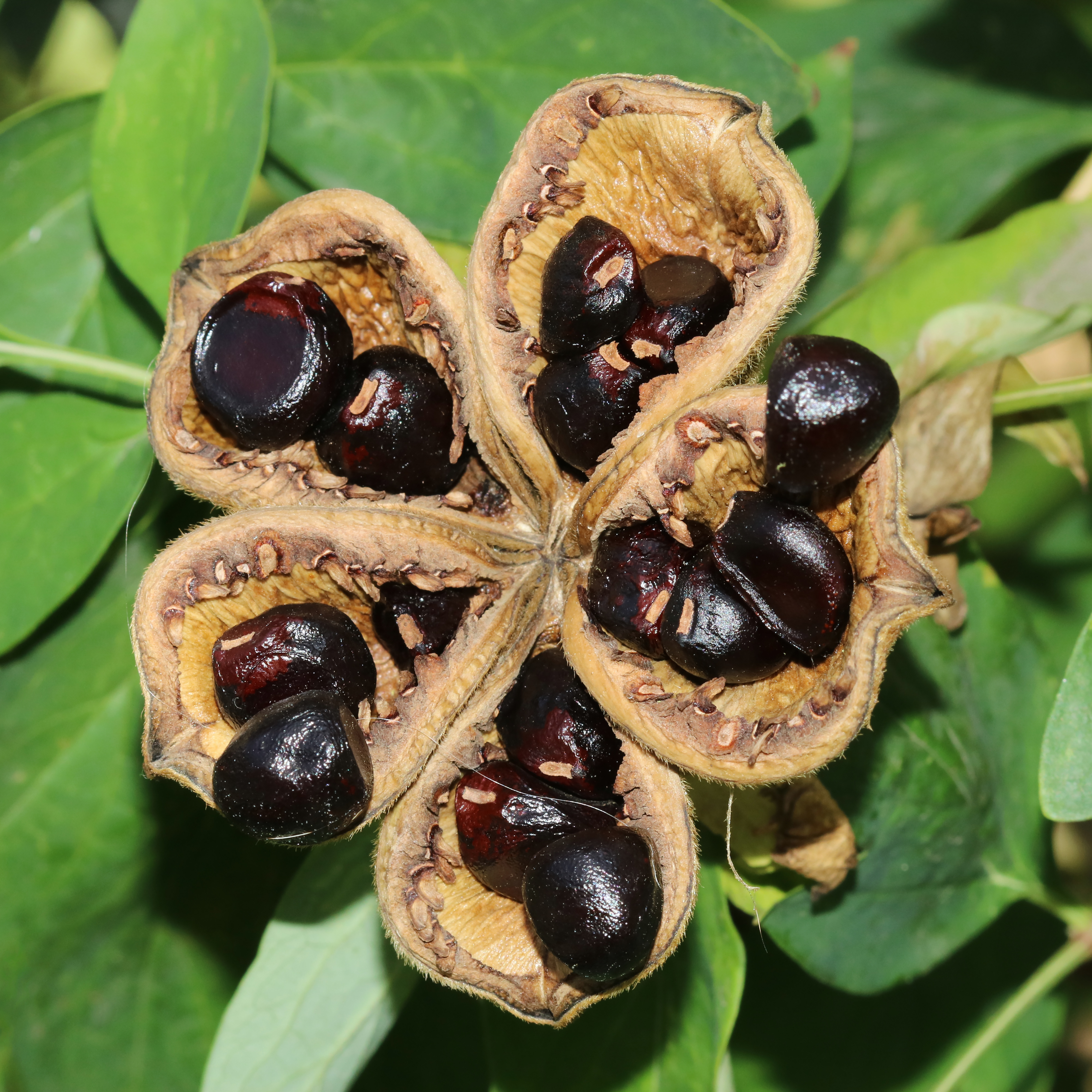
Five ripe follicles of Paeonia × suffruticosa
