= Paeonia decomposita =

Scientific classification
- Kingdom: Plantae
- Clade: Tracheophytes
- Clade: Angiosperms
- Clade: Eudicots
- Order: Saxifragales
- Family: Paeoniaceae
- Genus: Paeonia
- Species: P. decomposita

Binomial name
- Paeonia decomposita Handel-Mazzetti, 1939

Species of peony

Paeonia decomposita is a deciduous shrub in the peony family. It is classified as an endangered species and is native to northwest Sichuan.

== Description ==
Paeonia decomposita is a little-known tree peony, which grows to a height of up to 1.8 m (5 ft 11 in). Stems grow up to 2 cm (0.79 in) in diameter. Bark is dark grey, with a tendency to peel or flake. Flowers grow singly at the ends of the stems, and are large and usually rose-pink in colour. Follicles are dark brown or black when mature, with glossy black seeds. The shrub flowers from April to May in China.

== Habitat ==
Paeonia decomposita grows primarily in young forest land, scrubland and on rocky cliffsides at altitudes of up to 2,050 to 3,100 m (6,730 to 10,170 ft).

== Medicinal usage ==
It is used in traditional Chinese medicine, where it is used to improve circulation and blood stasis. Its oil is used in cosmetics and medicines.
