= Paeonia qiui =

Scientific classification
- Kingdom: Plantae
- Clade: Tracheophytes
- Clade: Angiosperms
- Clade: Eudicots
- Order: Saxifragales
- Family: Paeoniaceae
- Genus: Paeonia
- Species: P. qiui

Binomial name
- Paeonia qiui Y.L.Pei & D.Y.Hong

Species of flowering plant

Paeonia qiui is a species of peony very similar to P. jishanensis, but with more divided foliage. It can reach up to 1.2m in height. Identification characteristics: petals with a red blotch at base; leaflets mostly entire (not lobed), often purple above; flowers single.

P. qiui is most closely related to P. cathayana and P. jishanensis.
