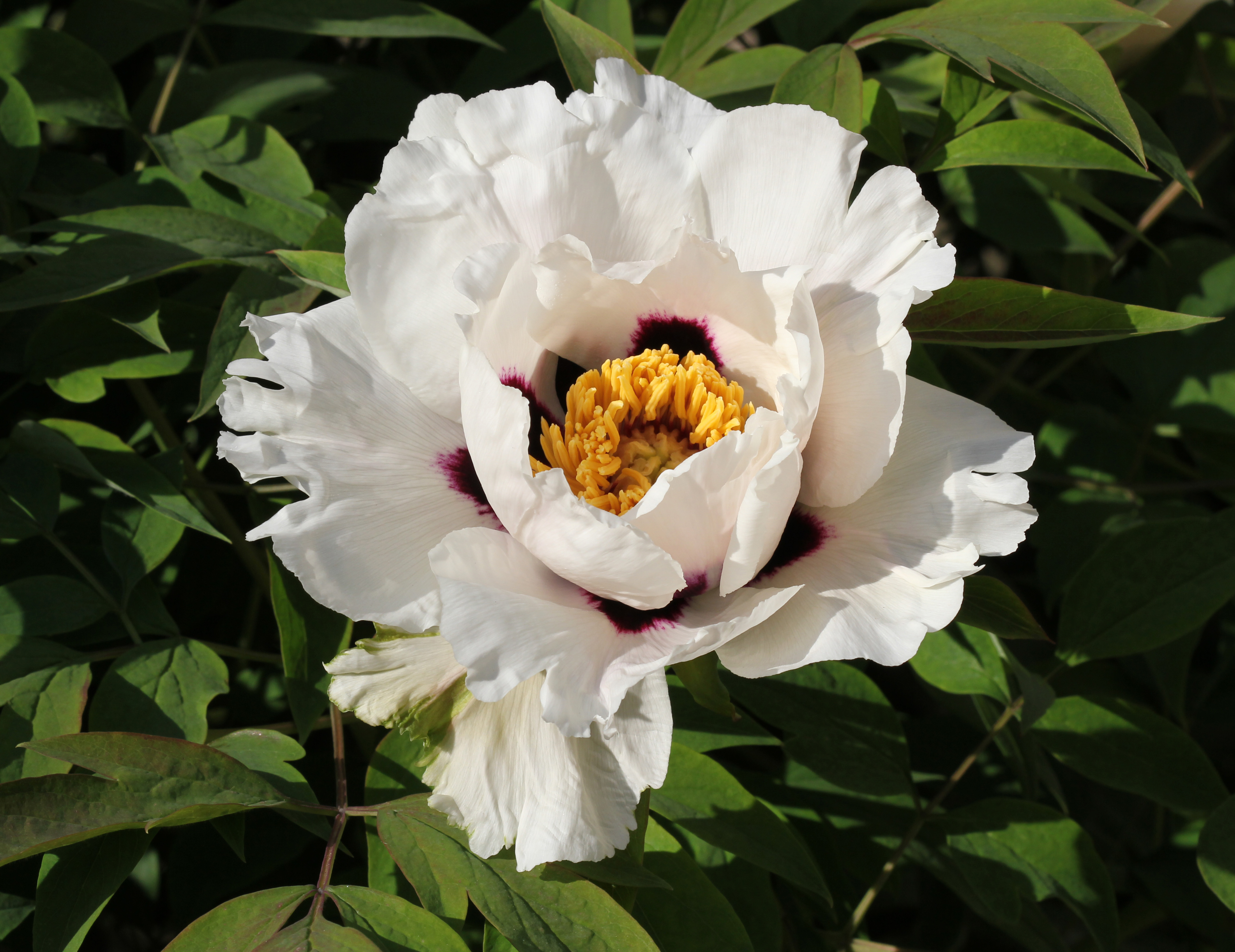

Scientific classification
- Kingdom: Plantae
- Clade: Tracheophytes
- Clade: Angiosperms
- Clade: Eudicots
- Order: Saxifragales
- Family: Paeoniaceae
- Genus: Paeonia
- Species: P. rockii

Binomial name
- Paeonia rockii (S.G.Haw & Lauener) T.Hong & J.J.Li

Synonyms
- P. moutan subsp. atava Brühl; P. rockii subsp. linyanshanii (Halda) T.Hong & G.L.Osti ex X.Y.Zhu & T.Hong; P. rockii subsp. taibaishanica D.Y.Hong; P. suffruticosa var linyanshanii Halda; P. suffruticosa subsp. atava (Brühl) S.G.Haw & Lauener

= Paeonia rockii =

Species of flowering plant

Paeonia rockii, or Rock's peony, is a woody species of tree peony that was named after Joseph Rock. It is one of several species given the vernacular name tree peony, and is native to the mountains of Gansu and adjoining provinces in China. In Chinese, it is known as 紫斑牡丹 (pinyin: zǐbān mǔdān).

== Uses ==
Paeonia rockii is cultivated as an ornamental plant in Asia and the west. Like Paeonia lactiflora, another Chinese peony species, it is used as a herbal remedy in traditional Chinese medicine.

== Features ==
Paeonia rockii is known for the obvious black, purple, and brown-red spots at the base of petals. Its main features are:

- Tall plant, can reach 2–3 m (6.6–9.8 ft) high, crown width 3–4 m (9.8–13.1 ft).
- Big and bright flower, the diameter can reach 18–25 cm (7–10 in).
- Strong fragrance; the smell of one open flower can dominate that of ten other open flowers from another peony.
- Resistance to drought and frost; tolerance of salt and base. Can bear temperatures as low as −43 °C (−45 °F); can still grow normally at pH above 7.

== Rockii hybrids ==
Tree peony hybrids with Paeonia rockii as one parent are called Rockii hybrids. In China there are several cultivar groups of these hybrids, called Gansu Mudan and Zhongyuan Mudan, or North-West Chinese cultivar group. The European-grown Suffruticosa Group (Paeonia × suffruticosa) also belongs here.

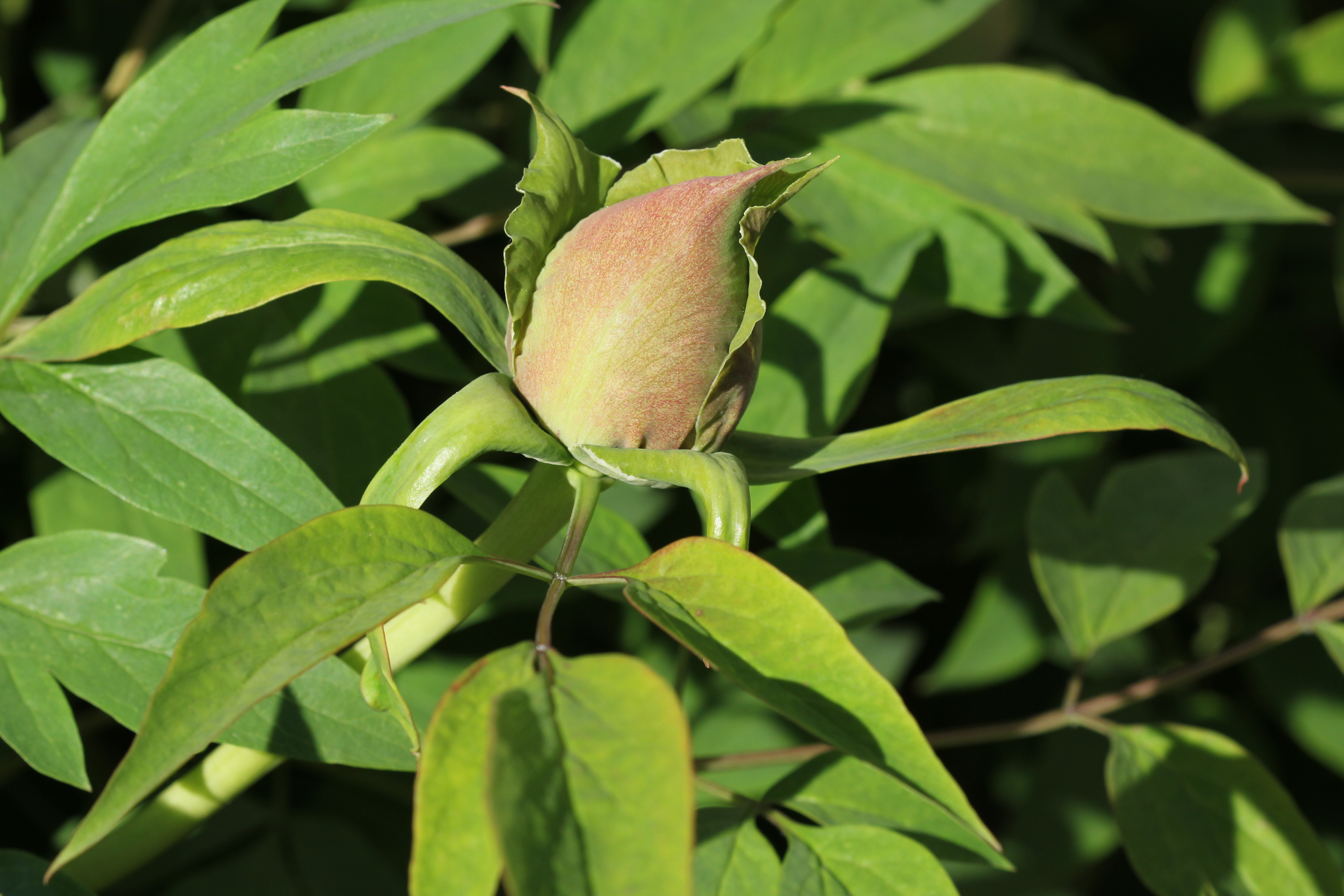
Bud

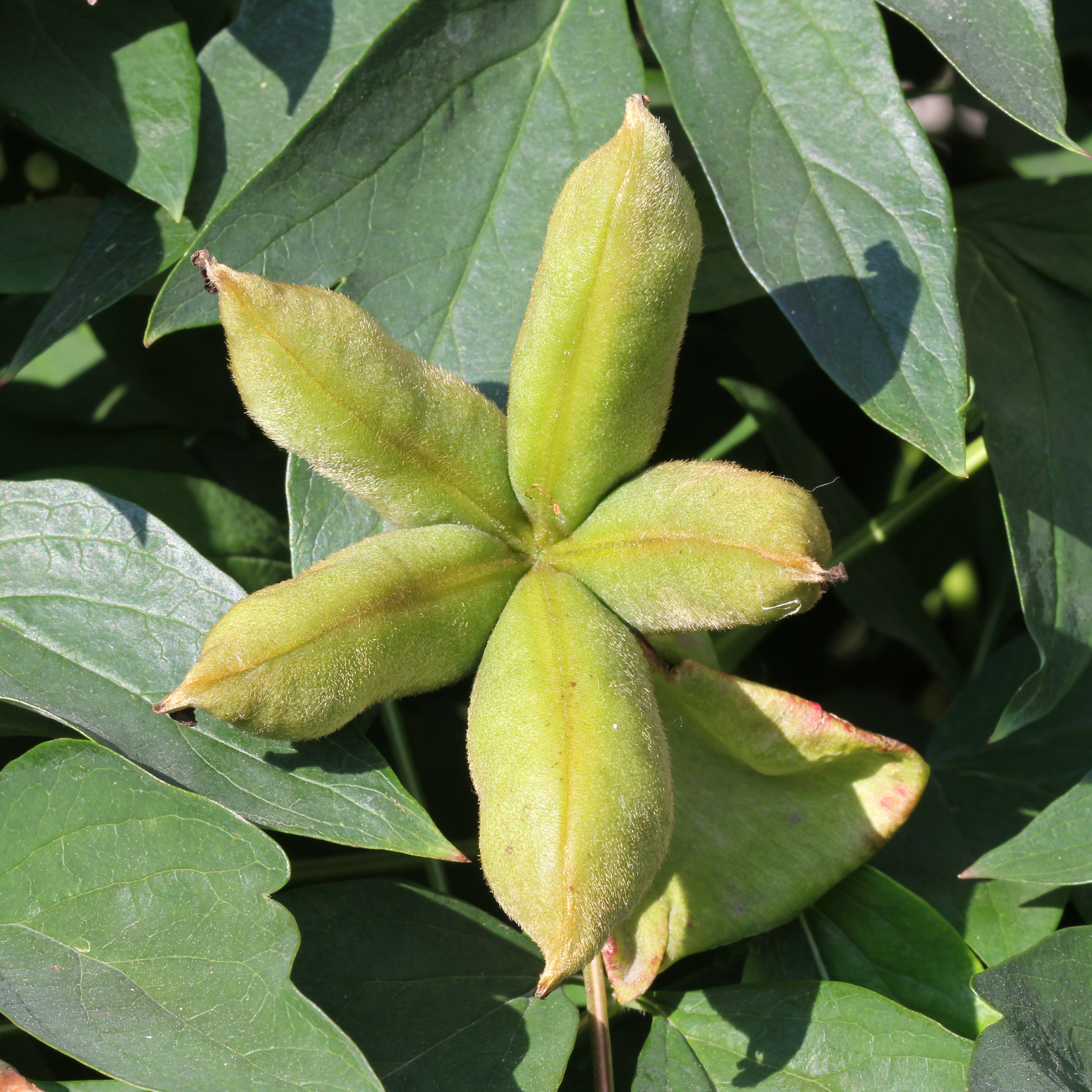
Fruit

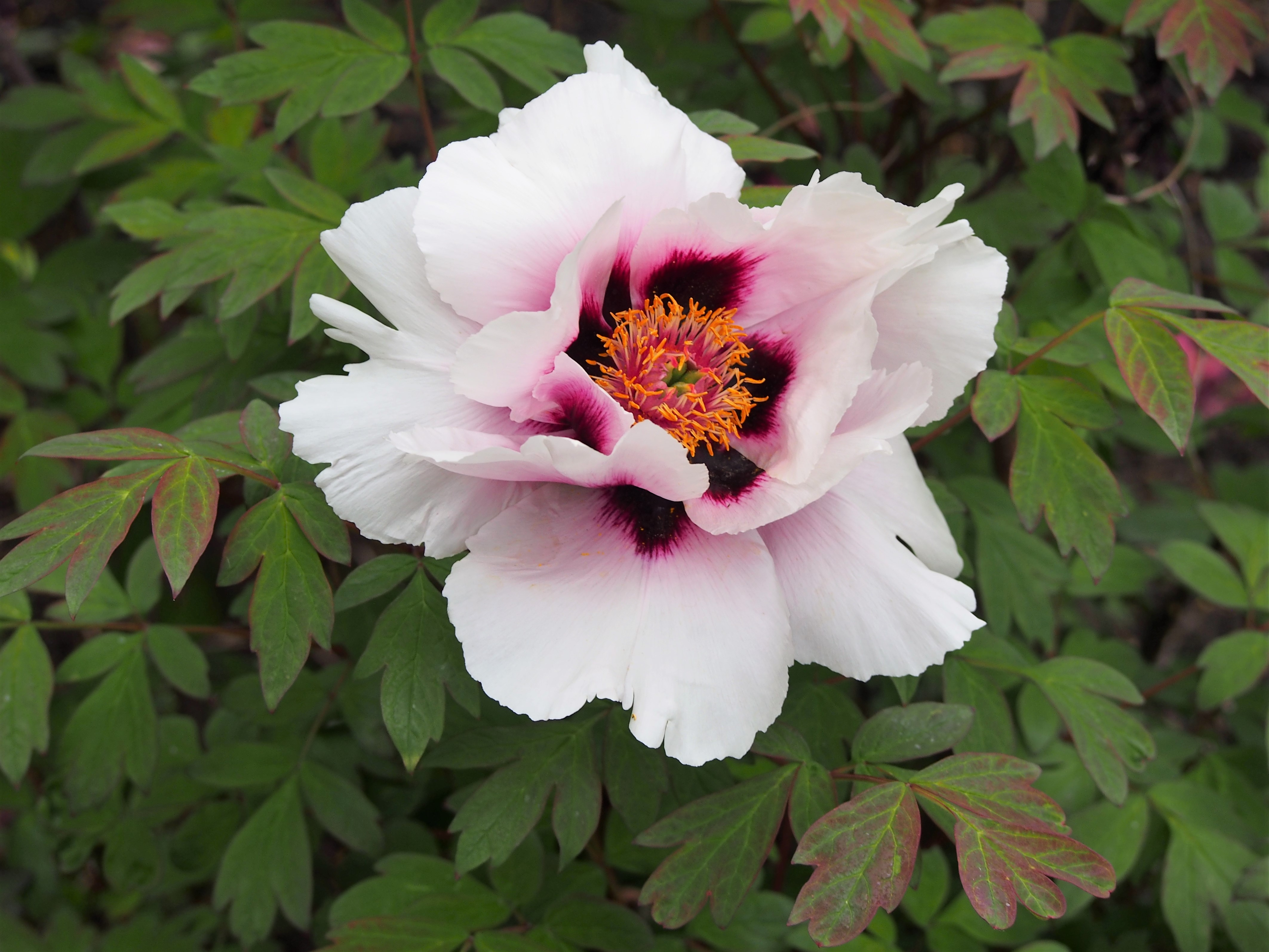
Flower

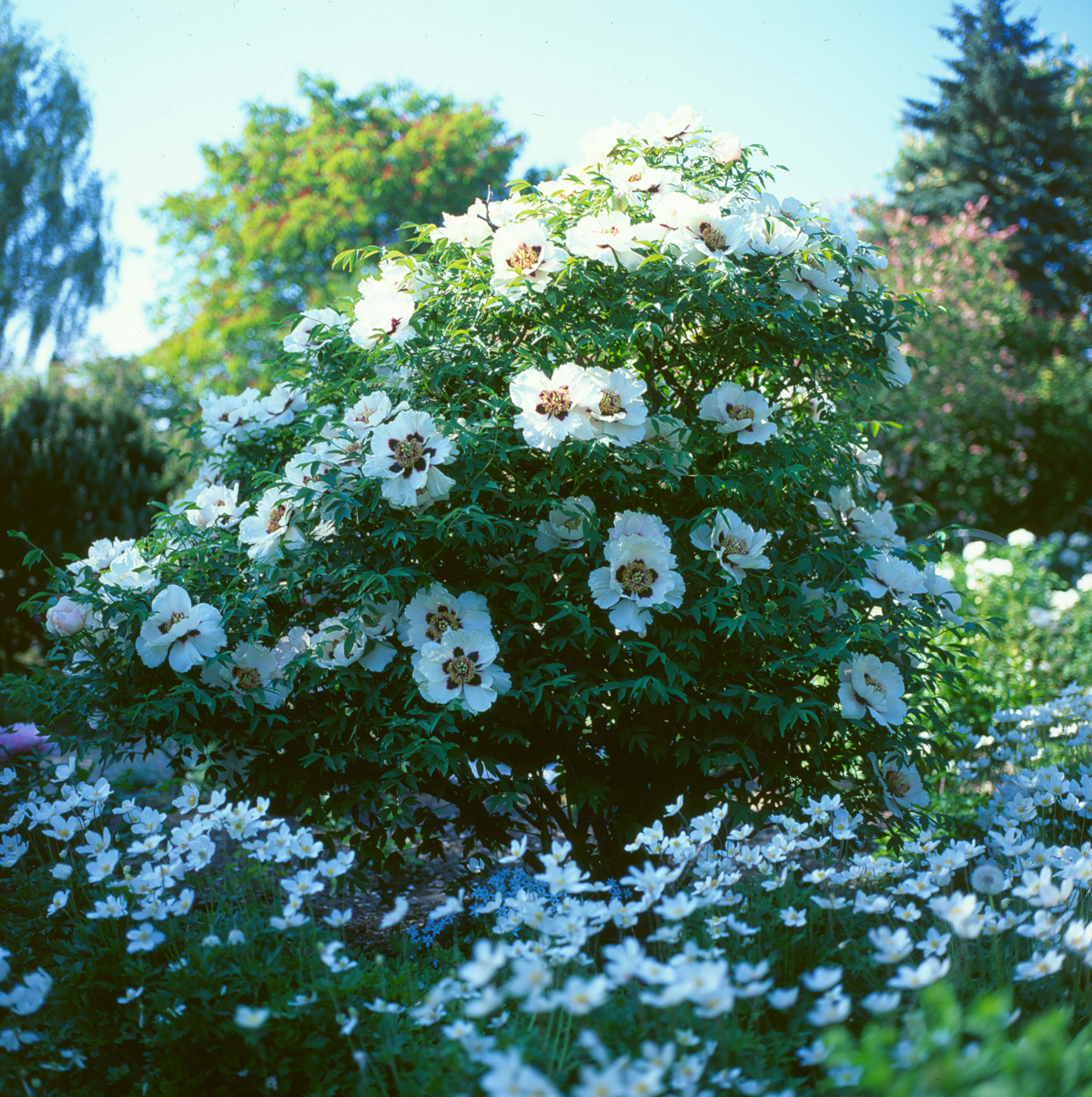
Flowering Tree peony (Paeonia rockii)
