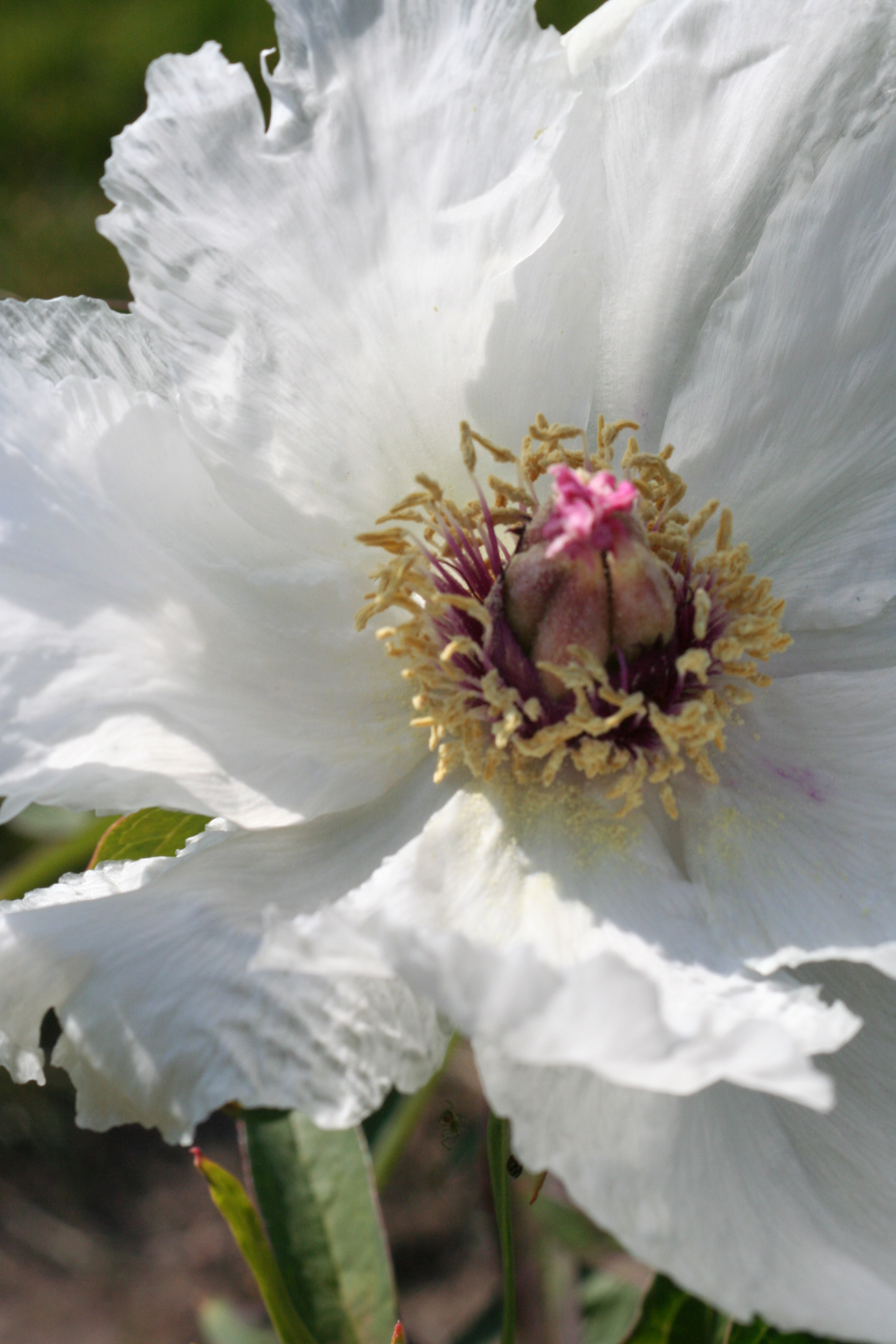
- Paeonia ostii 'Feng dan bai'

Scientific classification
- Kingdom: Plantae
- Clade: Tracheophytes
- Clade: Angiosperms
- Clade: Eudicots
- Order: Saxifragales
- Family: Paeoniaceae
- Genus: Paeonia
- Species: P. ostii

Binomial name
- Paeonia ostii T. Hong & J. X. Zhang

Synonyms
- Paeonia yinpingmudan (D.Y.Hong, K.Y.Pan & Zhang W.Xie) B.A.Shen

= Paeonia ostii =

Species of shrub

Paeonia ostii is a hardy shrub in the peony family, Paeoniaceae. It can be found in the Gansu, Anhui, Shaanxi and Henan provinces of China. It can reach heights of 1.5 m, and has grey-brown bark and lance-shaped leaflets. Flowers are produced in mid-spring, measure up to 15 cm across, and are typically pure white without basal blotches. The flowers can sometimes be faintly tinged with pink.

It grows in deciduous forests, and on slopes to an altitude of 300-600 m.

This species is the parent of two medicinal varieties of tree peonies. 'Feng Dan Bai' (Phoenix White) and 'Feng Dan Fen' (Phoenix Pink) are grown for the bark of their roots, which is used as an antispasmodic throughout Asia.
