= Paeonia jishanensis =

Scientific classification
- Kingdom: Plantae
- Clade: Tracheophytes
- Clade: Angiosperms
- Clade: Eudicots
- Order: Saxifragales
- Family: Paeoniaceae
- Genus: Paeonia
- Species: P. jishanensis

Binomial name
- Paeonia jishanensis T.Hong & W.Z.Zhao

Synonyms
- Paeonia spontanea (Rehder) T.Hong & W.Z.Zhao

Species of flowering plant

Paeonia jishanensis is a species of peony which produces white flowers, sometimes with pink shading at the base of the petals, in mid to late spring. The flowers are always borne singly. P. jishanensis can reach to 1.2m in height. This species was once thought to be a variety of P. suffruticosa.
