= List of endemic plants of the East Aegean Islands =

The East Aegean Islands is a biogeographic region that includes several islands and island groups in the eastern Aegean Sea, including Rhodes, Lesbos, Samos, Chios, Kos, Icaria, Symi, and many smaller islands. They are home to several dozen endemic species and subspecies of plants, including the endemic genus Kenopleurum.

Although the East Aegean Islands is politically part of Greece, the World Geographical Scheme for Recording Plant Distributions treats the East Aegean Islands as a separate botanical country from Greece, and as part of the Western Asia region rather than Southeastern Europe. The islands lie close to the western coast of Asia Minor, and many were linked to Asia Minor when sea levels were lower during the ice ages.

Plants are listed alphabetically by plant family.

== Amaryllidaceae ==
- Allium archeotrichon Brullo, Pavone & Salmeri – Rhodes, Tilos, Symi
- Allium candargyi Karavok. & Tzanoud. – Lesbos
- Allium chalkii Tzanoud. & Kollmann – Halki
- Allium exile Boiss. & Orph – Icaria
- Allium hirtovaginatum subsp. samium Brullo, Pavone & Salmeri – Samos
- Allium karvounis Brullo, Giusso & Musarella – Samos
- Allium makrianum C.Brullo, Brullo, Giusso & Salmeri – Chios
- Allium orosamium Brullo, Giusso & Musarella – Samos
- Allium pignattii Brullo & Salmeri – Samos
- Allium pythagoricum Brullo & Salmeri – Samos
- Allium rhodiacum Brullo, Pavone & Salmeri – Rhodes

== Apiaceae ==
- Carum pachypodium Candargy – Lesbos
- Kenopleurum Candargy
  - Kenopleurum virosum Candargy – eastern Lesbos
- Ornithogalum collinum subsp. rhodium Speta – Rhodes
- Ornithogalum sphaerolobum Zahar. – Kastellorizo
- Scilla voethorum Speta

== Asteraceae ==
- Anthemis rhodensis Boiss.
  - Anthemis rhodensis subsp. pulvinalis Rätzel & Ristow – Rhodes, Halki
  - Anthemis rhodensis subsp rhodensis
- Centaurea lactucifolia Boiss. – Rhodes
  - Centaurea lactucifolia var. halkensis (Fors.-Major & Barbey.) Wagenitz – Rhodes
  - Centaurea lactucifolia var. lactucifolia. – Rhodes
- Centaurea xylobasis Rech.f. – Samos

== Boraginaceae ==
- Symphytum davisii subsp. icaricum (Pawł.) Stearn – Icaria

== Brassicaceae ==
- Alyssum pogonocarpum Carlström – Rhodes
- Alyssum xiphocarpum Candargy – Lesbos
- Draba bruniifolia subsp. archipelagi (O.E.Schulz) Coode & Cullen
- Erysimum rhodium Snogerup
- Erysimum senoneri subsp. icaricum Snogerup
- Iberis runemarkii Greuter & Burdet
- Odontarrhena lesbiaca Candargy – Lesbos
- Odontarrhena samia (T.R.Dudley & Christod.) Španiel, Al-Shehbaz, D.A.German & Marhold
- Rorippa icarica Rech.f.

== Campanulaceae ==
- Campanula kastellorizana Carlström – Kastellorizo
- Campanula nisyria Papatsou & Phitos – Nisyros

== Caryophyllaceae ==
- Arenaria deflexa subsp. pseudofragillima McNeill – Chios
- Bufonia ophiolithica Ristow, J.Krause & Rätzel
- Dianthus fruticosus subsp. karavius Runemark – Petrokaravi
- Dianthus fruticosus subsp. rhodius (Rech.f.) Runemark
- Silene salamandra Pamp. – Rhodes
- Silene samia Melzh. & Christod.

== Crassulaceae ==
- Sedum samium subsp. samium
- Umbilicus albido-opacus Carlström

== Fabaceae ==
- Astragalus angustifolius subsp. aegeicus Brullo, Giusso & Musarella
- Colutea insularis Browicz – Rhodes
- Vicia davisii Greuter – Kastellorizo

== Geraniaceae ==
- Erodium vetteri Barbey & Fors.-Major – Samos

== Hypericaceae ==
- Hypericum icaricum Kit Tan – Icaria

== Iridaceae ==
- Crocus harveyi Rukšāns – Icaria
- Crocus homeri Rukšāns – Chios
- Crocus rhodensis Rukšāns – Symi, Rhodes
- Crocus samarasii Rukšāns – Kos
- Crocus seisumsiana Rukšāns – Samos

== Lamiaceae ==
- Origanum symes Carlström
- Satureja icarica P.H.Davis
- Scutellaria brevibracteata subsp. icarica (Rech.f.) Greuter & Burdet
- Thymus samius Ronniger & Rech.f. – Samos

== Liliaceae ==
- Fritillaria rhodia A.Hansen – Rhodes

== Linaceae ==
- Linum gyaricum subsp. icaricum Christod.

== Orchidaceae ==
- Anacamptis × lesbiensis (Biel) H.Kretzschmar, Eccarius & H.Dietr. (A. pyramidalis × A. sancta)
- Dactylorhiza majalis subsp. pythagorae (Gölz & H.R.Reinhard) H.A.Pedersen – Samos
- Himantoglossum × agiasense (Karatzas) Deniz (H. comperianum × H. montis-tauri)
- Ophrys × mariae F.Fohringer (O. scolopax var. minutula × O. speculum subsp. regis-ferdinandii)
- Ophrys × marmarensis H.Baumann & Künkele (O. holosericea × O. umbilicata)
- Orchis × kretzschmariorum B.Baumann & H.Baumann (O. anatolica × O. provincialis)
- × Serapicamptis sonii (M.Hirth & H.Spaeth) H.Kretzschmar, Eccarius & H.Dietr. (Anacamptis morio subsp. caucasica × Serapias orientalis)

== Paeoniaceae ==
- Paeonia clusii subsp. rhodia (Stearn) Tzanoud. – Rhodes

== Plantaginaceae ==
- Cymbalaria paradoxa (Greuter) Carnicero – Dodecanese
- Digitalis ikarica (P.H.Davis) Strid

== Plumbaginaceae ==
- Acantholimon aegaeum F.W.Mey.
- Armeria icarica Edm. – Icaria Is.
- Limonium monolithicum Erben & Brullo – Rhodes
- Limonium quinnii M.B.Crespo & Pena-Martín – Rhodes
- Limonium rhodense M.B.Crespo & Pena-Martín – Rhodes
- Limonium samium Erben & Brullo

== Poaceae ==
- Alopecurus davisii Bor – Samos
- Festuca cyllenica subsp. thasia Markgr.-Dann.
- Festuca pseudosupina J.Vetter – Lesbos

== Primulaceae ==
- Cyclamen rhodium subsp. rhodium – Kos, Rhodes

== Ranunculaceae ==
- Delphinium samium (P.H.Davis) Jabbour – Samos
- Nigella icarica Strid

== Rubiaceae ==
- Cynanchica icarica (Ehrend. & Schönb.-Tem.) P.Caputo & Del Guacchio – Icaria
- Cynanchica lilaciflora subsp. coa (Rech.f.) P.Caputo & Del Guacchio – Kor
- Cynanchica lilaciflora subsp. runemarkii (Ehrend. & Schönb.-Tem.) P.Caputo & Del Guacchio
- Cynanchica nitida subsp. mytilinica (Ehrend.) P.Caputo & Del Guacchio – Lesbos
- Cynanchica samia (Christod. & T.Georgiadis) P.Caputo & Del Guacchio – Samos
- Galium pastorale Krendl
- Galium samium Krendl – Samos

== Scrophulariaceae ==
- Verbascum × amaliense Rech.f. (V. lasianthum × V. vacillans)
- Verbascum × coum Rech.f., Mitt (V. mykales × V. pycnostachyum) – Kos
- Verbascum ikaricum Murb.
- Verbascum × inexspectatum Rech.f. (V. mucronatum × V. vacillans)
- Verbascum × mytilinense Rech.f. (V. aschersonii × V. sinuatum)
- Verbascum piscicidum Candargy – Lesbos
- Verbascum × rhodium Rech.f. (V. sinuatum × V. syriacum) – Rhodes
- Verbascum strictum E.D.Clarke – Rhodes
- Verbascum × subsplendidum Rech.f. (V. mykales × V. splendidum) – Kos
- Verbascum × subvacillans Rech.f. (V. sinuatum × V. vacillans) – Lesbos
- Verbascum syriacum Schrad. – Rhodes
