= A. divergens =

A. divergens may refer to:

- Abacetus divergens, a ground beetle
- Acacia divergens, a shrub native to Western Australia
- Agropyron divergens, a synonym of Pseudoroegneria spicata, bluebunch wheatgrass, native to western North America
- Agrotis divergens, a synonym of Euxoa divergens, a moth found in North America
- Ansorgia divergens, a moth found in Uganda
- Anthophila divergens, a synonym of Schinia gracilenta, a moth found in the United States
- Aphthonetus divergens, a synonym of Hyposmocoma divergens, a moth found in Hawaii
- Asperula divergens, a synonym of Cynanchica rumelica, a plant found in Europe
- Astragalus divergens, a synonym of Astragalus miser, the timber milkvetch, a plant native to western North America
- Atylus divergens, a synonym of Isopogon divergens, spreading coneflower, a plant found in Western Australia
- Austroblechnum divergens, a fern found in the Americas
