= Cynanchica abbreviata =

Scientific classification
- Kingdom: Plantae
- Clade: Embryophytes
- Clade: Tracheophytes
- Clade: Spermatophytes
- Clade: Angiosperms
- Clade: Eudicots
- Clade: Asterids
- Order: Gentianales
- Family: Rubiaceae
- Genus: Cynanchica
- Species: C. abbreviata

Binomial name
- Cynanchica abbreviata (Halácsy) P.Caputo & Del Guacchio

Synonyms
- Asperula abbreviata (Halácsy) Rech.f.; Asperula lutea var. abbreviata Halácsy

Species of flowering plant

Cynanchica abbreviata, commonly known as woodruff, is a species of flowering plant in the family Rubiaceae that is endemic to Naxos and Amorgos in Greece. It was first formally described in 1901 by Eugen von Halácsy who gave it the name Asperula lutea var. abbreviata in Conspectus Florae Graecae. In 1943, Karl Heinz Rechinger raised the variety to species status as Asperula abbreviata in Denkschriften der Kaiserlichen Akademie der Wissenschaften / Mathematisch-Naturwissenschaftliche Classe. In 2020, it was reclassified into the newly erected genus Cynanchica.

== Description ==
Cynanchica abbreviata appears as a small green moss-like plant, with small (1 in or 25 mm) pale pink flowers, on relatively long stems, it has a compact cushion of small, green, needle-like, leaves.

== Growth cycle ==
Cynanchica abbreviata flowers around May–June, and grows best in a rock garden, trough or crevice.
