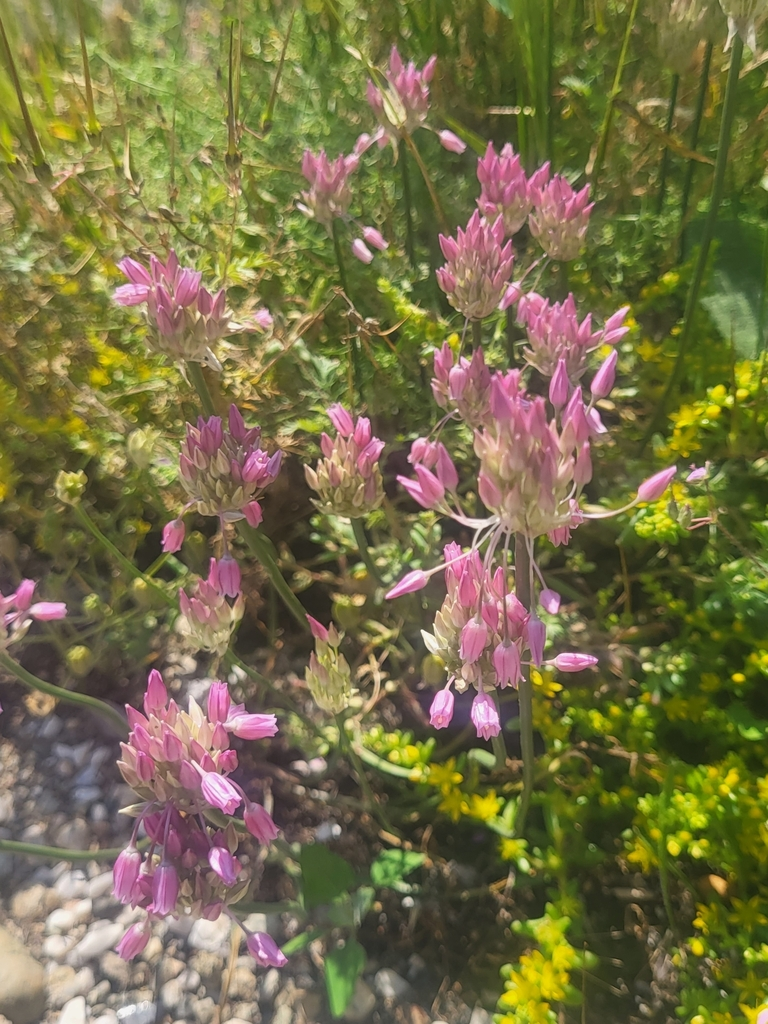
- In the Meteora municipality

Scientific classification
- Kingdom: Plantae
- Clade: Tracheophytes
- Clade: Angiosperms
- Clade: Monocots
- Order: Asparagales
- Family: Amaryllidaceae
- Subfamily: Allioideae
- Genus: Allium
- Species: A. meteoricum

Binomial name
- Allium meteoricum Heldr. & Hausskn. ex Halácsy

= Allium meteoricum =

Species of plant

Allium meteoricum is a species of flowering plant in the family Amaryllidaceae. It is native to northern Greece. A clump-forming bulbous geophyte reaching 15 cm (6 in), it has rounded umbels of flowers with pink petals and yellow anthers. The Royal Horticultural Society considers it a good plant to attract pollinators. The species is diploid and has a chromosome number 2n = 16.
