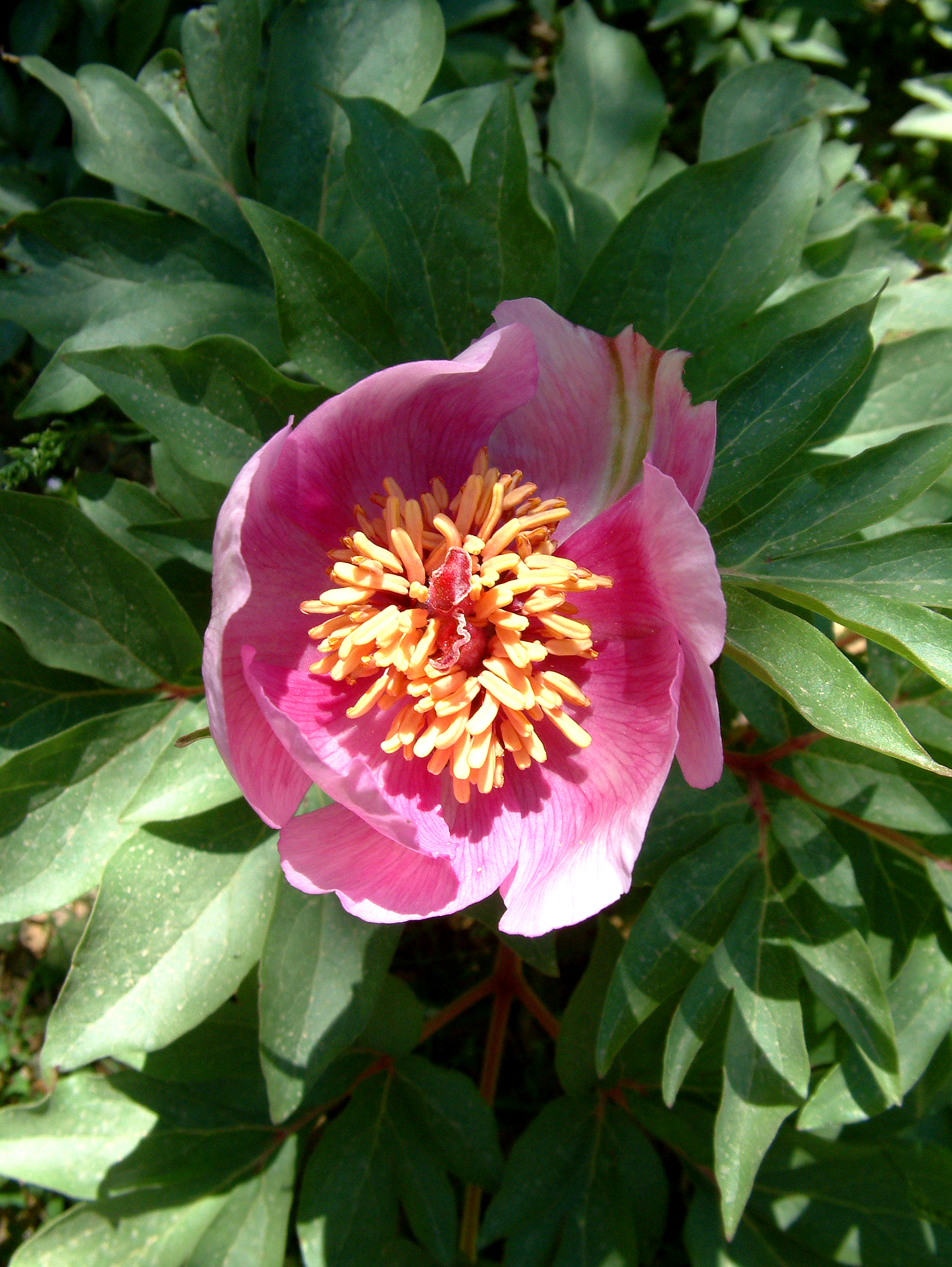

Scientific classification
- Kingdom: Plantae
- Clade: Tracheophytes
- Clade: Angiosperms
- Clade: Eudicots
- Order: Saxifragales
- Family: Paeoniaceae
- Genus: Paeonia
- Species: P. clusii

Binomial name
- Paeonia clusii Stern (1940)

Subspecies
- P. clusii subsp. clusii; P. clusii subsp. rhodia (Stearn) Tzanoud.

Synonyms
- Paeonia arietina var. carnea DC. (1824); Paeonia arietina var. oxoniensis G.Anderson (1818); Paeonia cretica Tausch (1828), nom. illeg., non Sabine; Paeonia foemina var. cretica (Huth) Gürke (1903); Paeonia officinalis var. cretica (Huth) Asch. & Graebn. (1923); Paeonia peregrina var. cretica Huth (1891)

= Paeonia clusii =

Species of plant

Paeonia clusii is a relatively low (25–50 cm) species of herbaceous peony with scented, white or pink flowers of up to 12 cm in diameter. In the wild, the species can only be found on the islands of Crete and Karpathos (subsp. clusii), and Rhodes (subsp. rhodia). It has pinkish-purple stem up to 30 cm long and glaucous dissected leaves. P. clusii blooms in mid-spring.

== Description ==
Paeonia clusii is a perennial, herbaceous plant of 25–50 cm high. Both diploid (2n=10) and tetraploid (2n=20) specimens have been found.

=== Root, stems and leaves ===
The main roots are slightly tuberous, up to 2.5 cm wide, with thinner carrot-shaped side roots. The stems are mostly tinged purple, with several (up to nine) scales at their base. Leaves are split into three sets of leaflets, themselves further divided into twenty three to forty eight, 2.5–4.5 cm wide, ovate to lanceolate (subspecies rhodia) or to ninety five lanceolate to linear, 0.5–3.3 cm wide, segments (in the typical subspecies). The leaf is mostly hairless, but sometimes the lower surface carries a few hairs.

=== Flower, fruit and seed ===
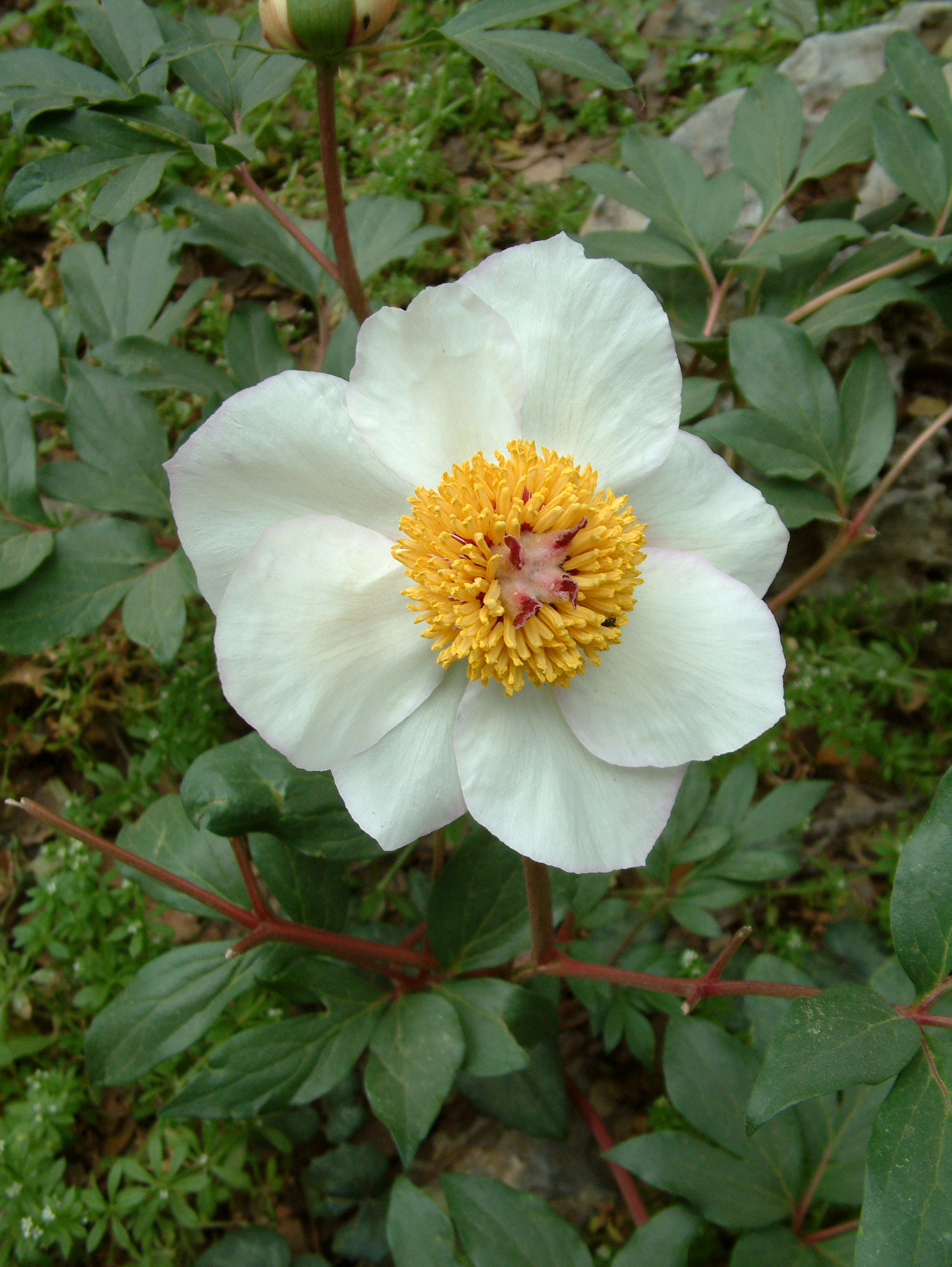
The usual white-flowered variant

The flowers are set individually at the tip of the stems, and are subtended by one or two bracts that look like small segmented leaves. There are three or four rounded sepals, green but purple around the margin, and with a rounded tip. Within are seven white or pink petals of 4–5 cm long and 2.5–4 cm wide. The many stamens consist of purple filaments topped by yellow anthers. The disk that encircle the carpels is 0.5–1 mm high and covered in soft hair. Two to four (or rarely only one) red carpels are covered in soft, white, 2–2.5 mm long hairs and topped by an almost seated flattened, recurving, red stigma 1.5–2 mm wide. Each carpel later develops into an ellipsoid fruit called a follicle, that is 3.5–4 cm long and about 1.5 cm wide, and which is curved down when ripe, and contains oval black seeds of 8 mm long and 5 mm in diameter.

=== Differences between the subspecies ===
Subspecies rhodia is characterised by twenty three to forty eight, ovate to lanceolate leaf segments, each between 2.5 and 4.5 cm wide. Subspecies clusii has between twenty three and ninety five leaf segments in the lower leaves. The segments are lanceolate to linear, each usually no more than 2.7 cm wide, but rare exceptions to 3.3 cm.

== Taxonomy ==
In 1824, Joseph Sabine describes Paeonia cretica based on a specimen from the University of Oxford Botanic Garden, which later turned out to be synonymous to Paeonia arietina (named in 1818), and this plant probably originated from mainland Turkey, not from Crete. Another specimen, now from Crete, was described as P. cretica in 1828 by Tausch, but at that moment the name was no longer available, and hence invalid. Stern proposed P. clusii to replace Tausch's name. Stearn, in 1941, distinguished the population on Rhodes as a separate species and named it P. rhodia. Tzanoudakis however, points out it only differs in the number and shape of the leaf segments, and thus regards it as a subspecies of P. clusii.

=== Etymology ===
Paeonia clusii was named in honor of the Dutch botanist Carolus Clusius, who was the first to write about a white flowered peony from Crete, already in 1601.

== Ecology ==
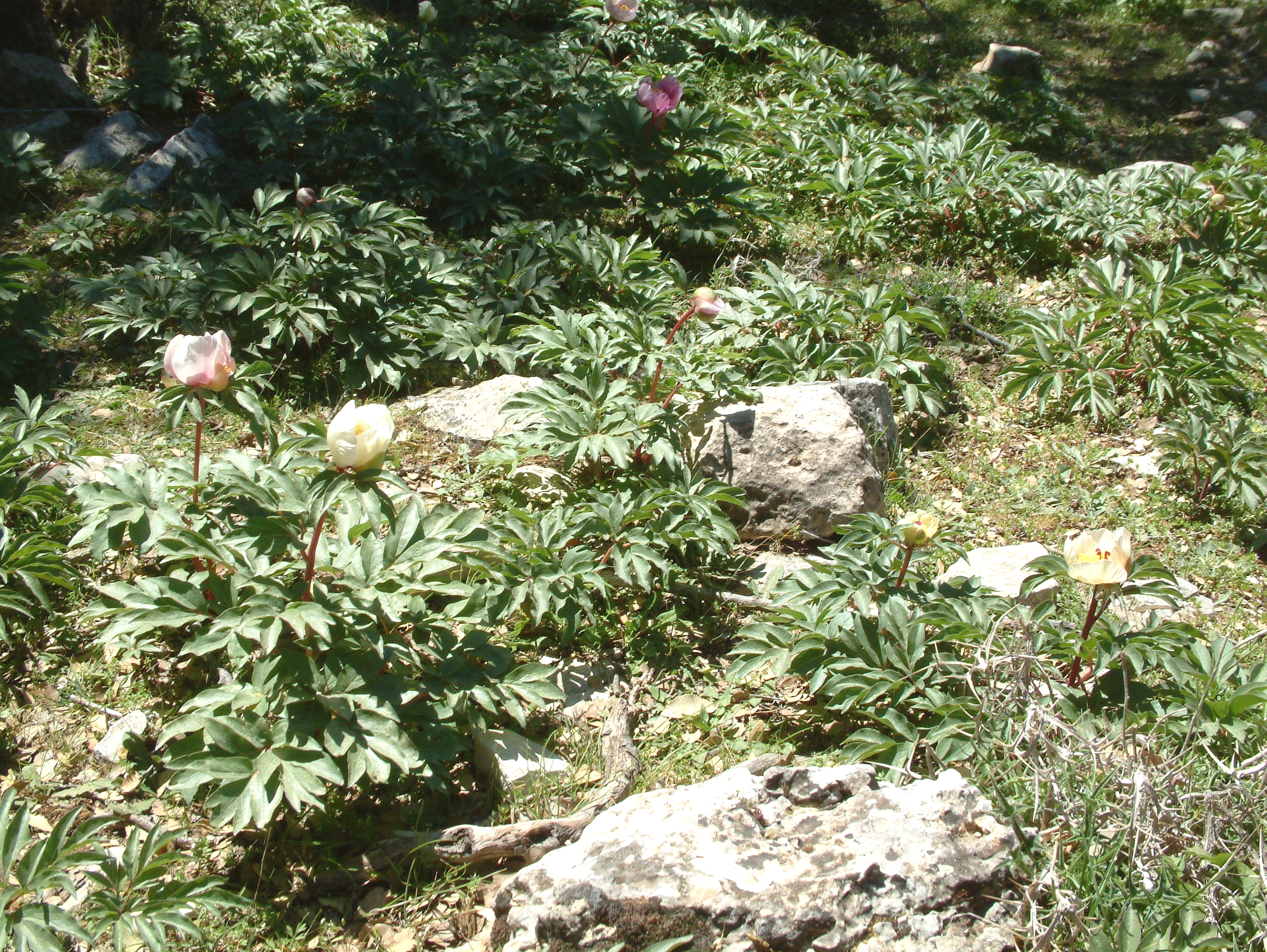
A group of P. clusii growing on Crete

The typical subspecies grows in maquis on limestone between 200–1900 m elevation. Subspecies rhodia occurs as undergrowth of pines at an elevation of 350–850 m.

== Cultivation ==
Rhodes' peony likes well-drained, loamy soil or compost. It's hardy in the UK, but because it starts growing in late winter the leaves may be damaged by frosts. As can be expected from a plant from the Mediterranean, they suffer from wet soil.
