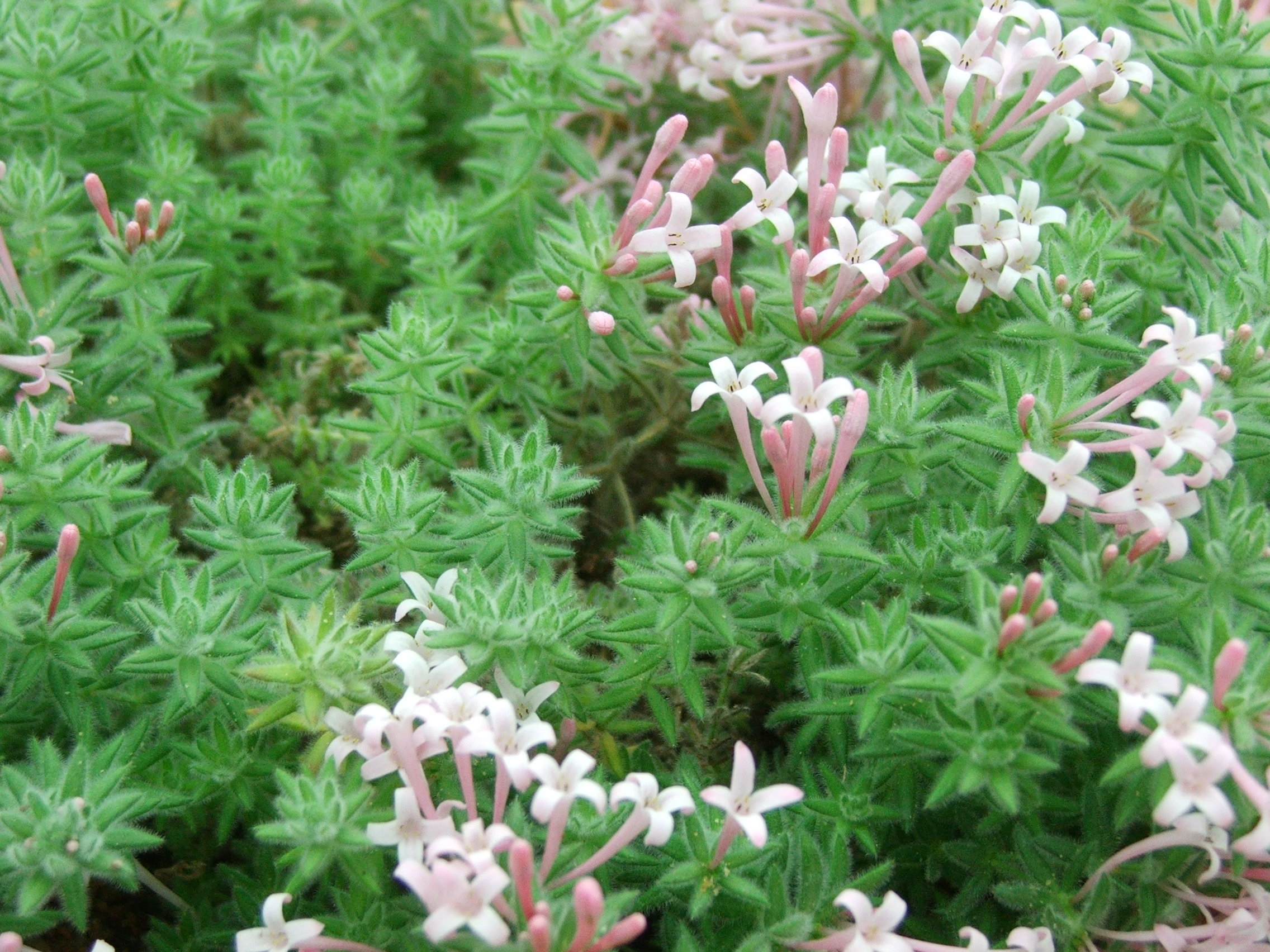
- University of Oxford Botanic Garden (Sulwen 2006)

Scientific classification
- Kingdom: Plantae
- Clade: Tracheophytes
- Clade: Angiosperms
- Clade: Eudicots
- Clade: Asterids
- Order: Gentianales
- Family: Rubiaceae
- Genus: Asperula
- Species: A. arcadiensis

Binomial name
- Asperula arcadiensis Sims

= Asperula arcadiensis =

Species of flowering plant

Asperula arcadiensis, the Arcadian woodruff, is a species of flowering plant in the coffee family Rubiaceae, native to the Peloponnese Mountains of Greece.

== Description ==
A compact, mat-forming evergreen perennial, it forms a mound up to 10 centimetres (3.9 in) tall by 50 centimetres (20 in) wide of soft grey-green leaves covered in pale pink tubular flowers in Spring. It is often confused with A. suberosa which it resembles. It grows in sun or partial shade, in any reasonably moist, well-drained soil, but prefers coastal areas and other mild locations where temperatures do not fall below −5 °C (23 °F), or alternatively the protection of an alpine house.

This plant has gained the Royal Horticultural Society's Award of Garden Merit.

== Growth cycle ==
Asperula ambleia flowers around May-June, and grows best in a rock garden, trough or crevice.
