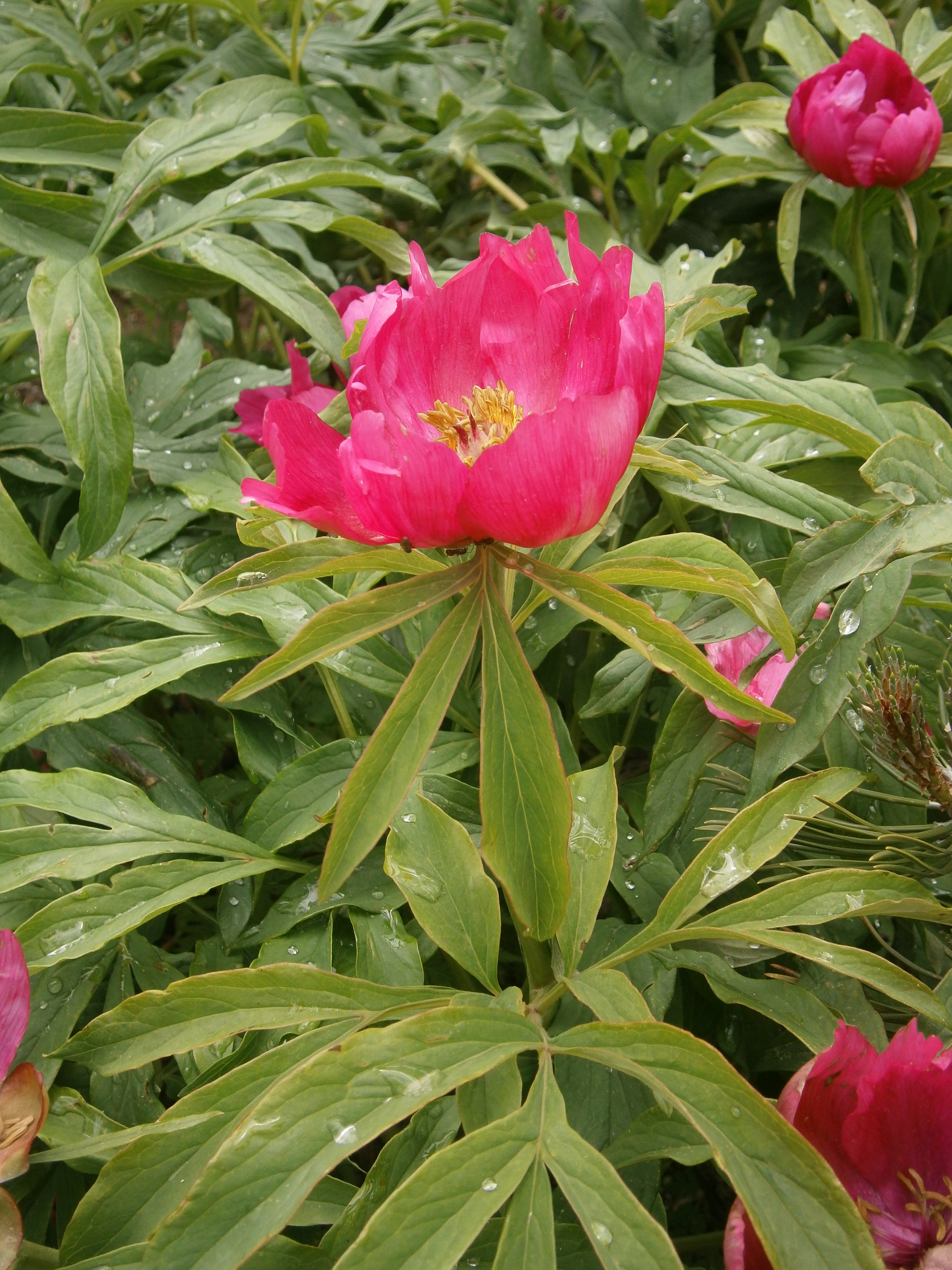

Conservation status
- Least Concern (IUCN 3.1)

Scientific classification
- Kingdom: Plantae
- Clade: Embryophytes
- Clade: Tracheophytes
- Clade: Angiosperms
- Clade: Eudicots
- Order: Saxifragales
- Family: Paeoniaceae
- Genus: Paeonia
- Species: P. officinalis

Binomial name
- Paeonia officinalis L.

= Paeonia officinalis =

Species of flowering plant

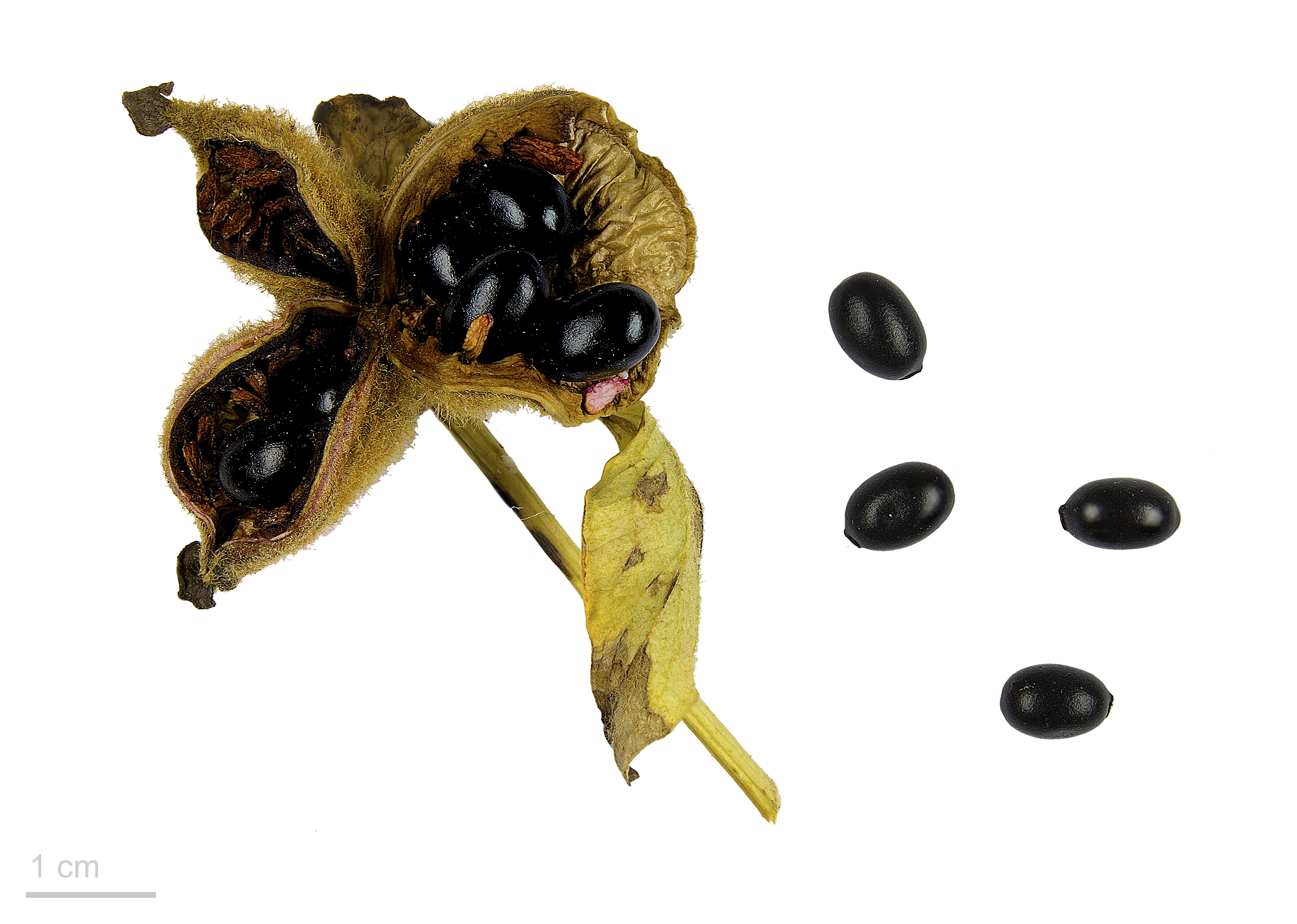
Paeonia officinalis - MHNT

Paeonia officinalis, the common peony, or garden peony, is a species of flowering plant in the family Paeoniaceae, native to mainly mountainous areas of Southern Europe and introduced in Central and Western Europe and North America.

Paeonia officinalis was first used for medicinal purposes, then grown as an ornamental. Many selections are now used in horticulture, though the typical species is uncommon. Paeonia officinalis is still found wild in Europe.

The cultivar 'Rubra Plena' (deep crimson double flowered) has gained the Royal Horticultural Society's Award of Garden Merit.

== Description ==
It is a herbaceous perennial growing to 60–70 cm (24–28 in) tall and wide, with leaves divided into 9 leaflets, and bowl-shaped deep pink or deep red flowers, 10–13 cm (4–5 in) in diameter, in late spring (May in the Northern Hemisphere).

== Distribution ==
The common peony is native to Europe in Spain, northern Portugal and southern France, Italy, Switzerland, western Romania and the Balkan Peninsula and possibly northern Greece (Royal Botanic Garden Edinburgh 1998, Lupo Osti 2006, Aghababian 2011, GRIN 2014). It is widely cultivated elsewhere, but considered a native endemic of Europe.

There are six known subspecies:

- P. officinalis subsp. arietina ((G. Anderson) N. G. Passal.): Native to Italy, Albania and Northern Caucasus.
- P. officinalis subsp. banatica ((Rochel) Soó): Native to Bosnia and Herzegovina, Hungary, Romania and Serbia.
- P. officinalis subsp. huthii (A. Soldano): Native to South-east France and North-West Italy.
- P. officinalis subsp. italica (N. G. Passal. & Bernardo): Native to Italy.
- P. officinalis subsp. microcarpa (Boiss. & Reuter) Nyman) (syn. P. humilis): Native to Portugal (Northeast and Estrela, Aire e Candeeiros and Montejunto ranges), Spain and southern France.
- P. officinalis subsp. officinalis: Native to Austria, Switzerland, Hungary, Romania, Slovakia, France, Italy, Slovenia, Croatia, Albania and introduced to the United States in Kentucky, Massachusetts, Vermont, West Virginia and Canada in Ontario.

== Taxonomy ==
Many synonyms exist for Paeonia officinalis, i.e. Moutan officinalis, Paeonia anemoniflora, P. barrii, P. baxteri, P. commutata, P. elegans, P. feminea, P. festiva, P. fimbrata, P. foemina, P. fulgens, P. fulgida, P. hirsuta, P. lanceolata, P. lobata, P. mollis, P. nemoralis, P. paradoxa var. fimbrata, P. peregrina var. officinalis, f. officinalis, P. porrigens, P. promiscua, P. pubens, P. rubens, P. sessiliflora, P. splendens, P. subternata, P. versicolor.

=== Genetics ===
The common peony is an allotetraploid with two double sets of chromosomes from different parents (2n+2m=20), so it is a hybrid or nothospecies. One of the parents is most likely Paeonia peregrina. The other parent is one of the group of very closely related species, Paeonia parnassica, P. arietina and P. humilis. Both these parents are tetraploids themselves. P. officinalis has by far the most extensive range and is one of the more abundant species in the Mediterranean region.
