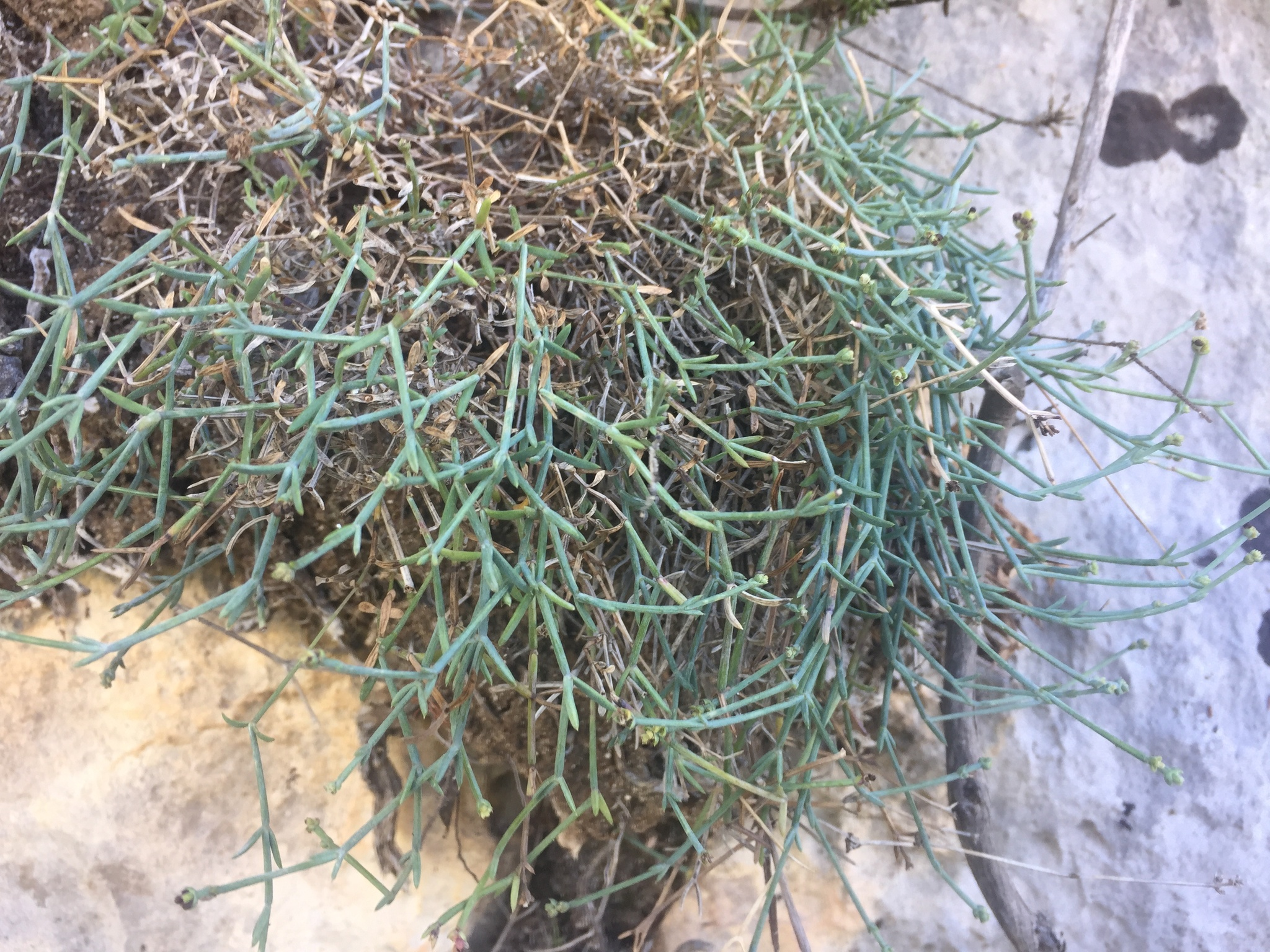

Scientific classification
- Kingdom: Plantae
- Clade: Tracheophytes
- Clade: Angiosperms
- Clade: Eudicots
- Clade: Asterids
- Order: Gentianales
- Family: Rubiaceae
- Genus: Cynanchica
- Species: C. naufraga

Binomial name
- Cynanchica naufraga (Ehrend. & Gutermann) P.Caputo & Del Guacchi

Synonyms
- Asperula naufraga Ehrend. & Gutermann

= Cynanchica naufraga =

Species of plant

Cynanchica naufraga is a species of flowering plant in the family Rubiaceae.

== Description ==
Cynanchica naufraga was first described in 2000 and is endemic to Greece.
