= Cynanchica affinis =

Scientific classification
- Kingdom: Plantae
- Clade: Embryophytes
- Clade: Tracheophytes
- Clade: Spermatophytes
- Clade: Angiosperms
- Clade: Eudicots
- Clade: Asterids
- Order: Gentianales
- Family: Rubiaceae
- Genus: Cynanchica
- Species: C. affinis

Binomial name
- Cynanchica affinis (Boiss. & A.Huet) P.Caputo & Del Guacchio

Synonyms
- Asperula affinis Boiss. & A.Huet; Asperula cynanchica var. affinis (Boiss. & A.Huet) Boiss.; Asperula dolichophylla Klokov

Species of flowering plant

Cynanchica affinis is a deciduous species of perennial groundcover, and a flowering plant in the family Rubiaceae. It is endemic to north-eastern Turkey and the Transcaucasus, and was first named by Boiss. & A.Huet.

== Description ==
Cynanchica affinis appears as a small green moss-like plant, with small (1 in or 25 mm) pale pink flowers, on stems, it has a compact cushion of small, green, needle-like, leaves.

== Growth cycle ==
Cynanchica affinis flowers around May–June, and grows best in a rock garden, trough or crevice.
