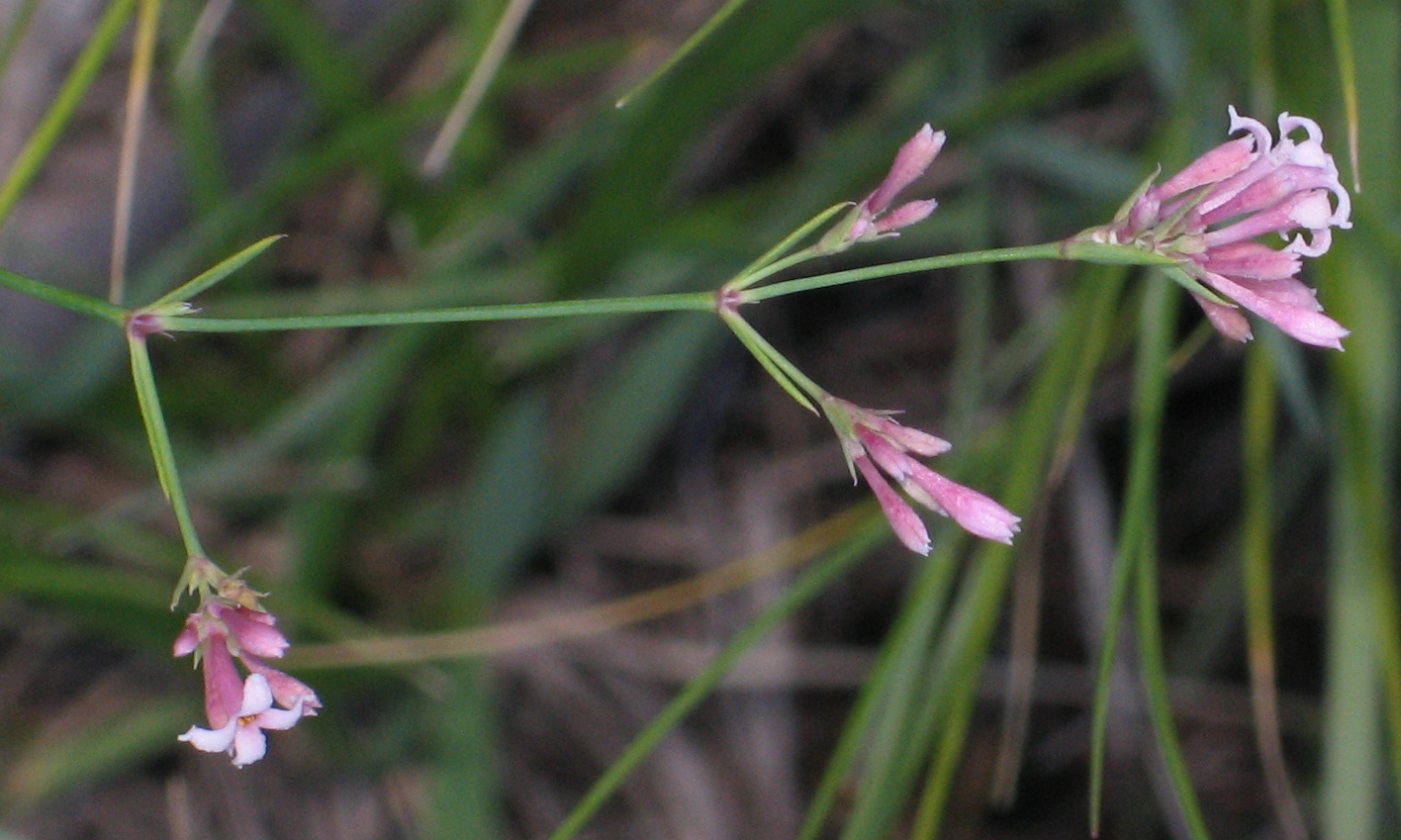
- Above Stalden at the path to Törbel, Valais, Switzerland

Scientific classification
- Kingdom: Plantae
- Clade: Embryophytes
- Clade: Tracheophytes
- Clade: Spermatophytes
- Clade: Angiosperms
- Clade: Eudicots
- Clade: Asterids
- Order: Gentianales
- Family: Rubiaceae
- Genus: Cynanchica
- Species: C. aristata

Binomial name
- Cynanchica aristata (L.f.) P.Caputo & Del Guacchio

Synonyms
- Asperula aristata L.f.; Asperula cynanchica subsp. aristata (L.f.) Bég.; Asperula longiflora var. aristata (L.f.) Rchb.

= Cynanchica aristata =

Species of flowering plant in the coffee family

Cynanchica aristata, commonly known as woodruff, is a deciduous species of perennial groundcover, and a flowering plant in the family Rubiaceae. It is native to Morocco, Libya, Algeria, Tunisia, Azerbaijan, Georgia, Armenia, Greece, Bulgaria, Albania, Serbia, North Macedonia, Croatia, Italy, Austria, Switzerland, France, Spain, and Portugal.

== Description ==
Cynanchica aristata appears as a long green plant, 10–60 cm (4–24 in) high, with small (1in) pale purple flowers, on long, thin, green, stems. It has thin, green, grass-like leaves. It flowers around May–June.

== Subspecies ==
The following subspecies are recognised:

- Cynanchica aristata subsp. aristata (L.f.) P.Caputo & Del Guacchio
- Cynanchica aristata subsp. calabra (Fiori) Del Guacchio & P.Caputo
- Cynanchica aristata subsp. condensata (Heldr. ex Boiss.) P.Caputo & Del Guacchio
- Cynanchica aristata subsp. nestia (Rech.f.) P.Caputo & Del Guacchio
- Cynanchica aristata subsp. scabra (C.Presl) P.Caputo & Del Guacchio
- Cynanchica aristata subsp. thessala (Boiss. & Heldr.) P.Caputo & Del Guacchio

== Cultivation ==
Cynanchica aristata grows best in a rock garden, trough or crevice.
