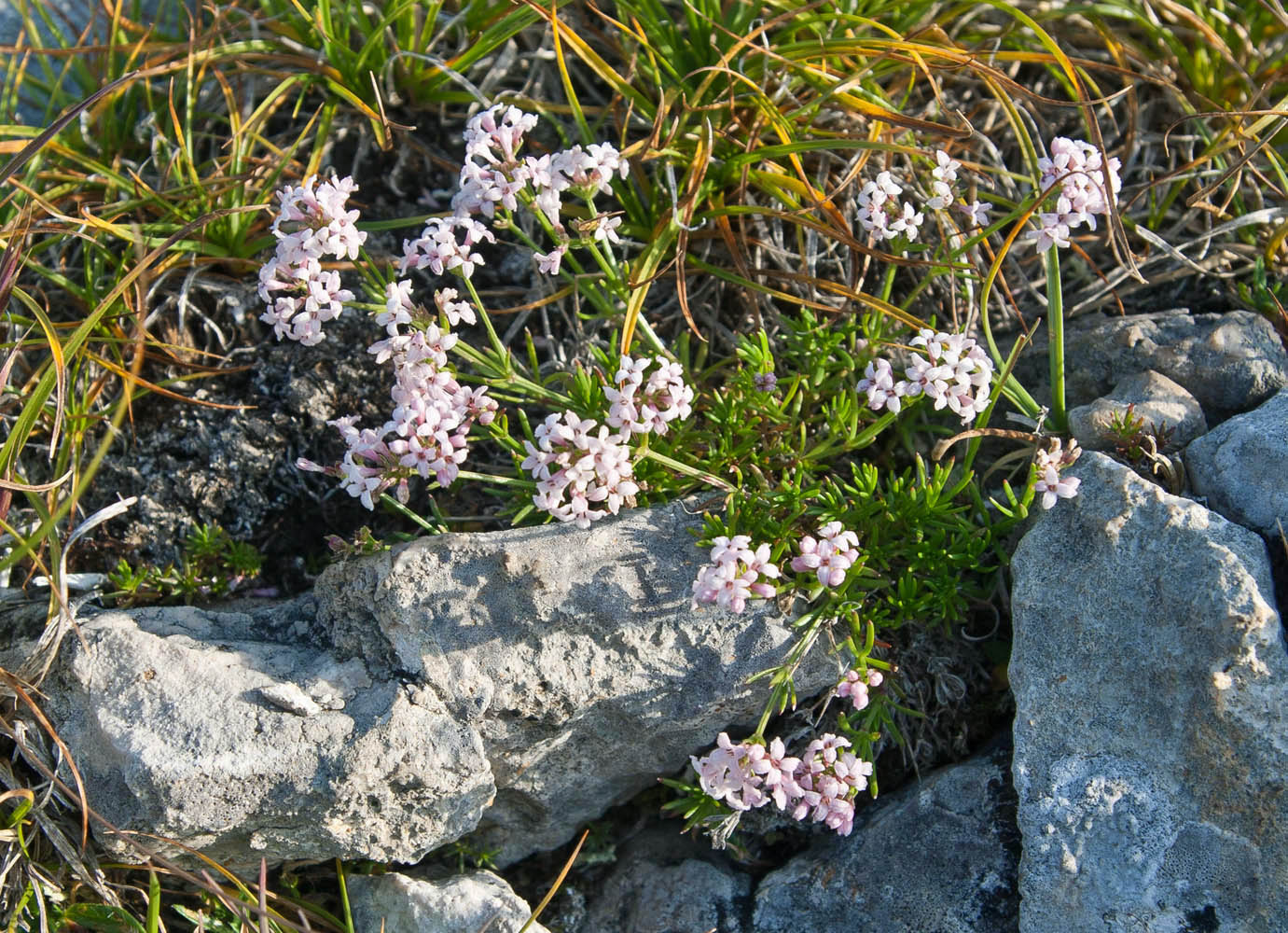

Scientific classification
- Kingdom: Plantae
- Clade: Tracheophytes
- Clade: Angiosperms
- Clade: Eudicots
- Clade: Asterids
- Order: Gentianales
- Family: Rubiaceae
- Genus: Cynanchica
- Species: C. abchasica

Binomial name
- Cynanchica abchasica (V.I.Krecz.) P.Caputo & Del Guacchio

Synonyms
- Asperula abchasica V.I.Krecz.

= Cynanchica abchasica =

Species of plant in the family Rubiaceae

Cynanchica abchasica, commonly known as woodruff, is a deciduous species of perennial groundcover, and a flowering plant in the family Rubiaceae. It is endemic to Transcaucasus, and was first named by V.I Krecz. In 2020, it was reclassified into the newly erected genus Cynanchica.

== Description ==
Cynanchica abchasica appears as a small green moss-like plant, with small (1in) pale pink flowers, on relatively long stems, it has a compact cushion of small, green, needle-like, leaves.

== Growth cycle ==
Cynanchica abchasica flowers around May-June, and grows best in a rock garden, trough or crevice.
