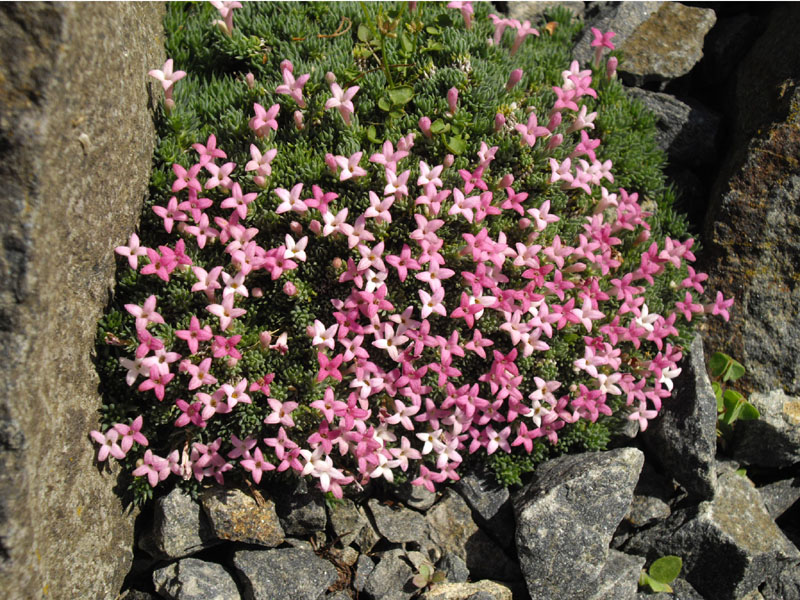

Scientific classification
- Kingdom: Plantae
- Clade: Embryophytes
- Clade: Tracheophytes
- Clade: Spermatophytes
- Clade: Angiosperms
- Clade: Eudicots
- Clade: Asterids
- Order: Gentianales
- Family: Rubiaceae
- Genus: Cynanchica
- Species: C. sintenisii

Binomial name
- Cynanchica sintenisii (Asch. ex Bornm.) P.Caputo & Del Guacchio

Synonyms
- Asperula sintenisii Asch. ex Bornm.

= Cynanchica sintenisii =

Species of flowering plant

Cynanchica sintenisii is a species of flowering plant in the family Rubiaceae.

== Description ==
Cynanchica sintenisii was first described in 1890 and is endemic to Greece.
