= Halacsya =

Scientific classification
- Kingdom: Plantae
- Clade: Tracheophytes
- Clade: Angiosperms
- Clade: Eudicots
- Clade: Asterids
- Order: Boraginales
- Family: Boraginaceae
- Genus: Halacsya; Dörfl. (1902)
- Species: H. sendtneri

Binomial name
- Halacsya sendtneri (Boiss.) Dörfl. (1902)

Subspecies
- Halacsya sendtneri subsp. devollensis F.K.Mey.; Halacsya sendtneri subsp. sendtneri

Synonyms
- Zwackhia Sendtn. (1858), nom. illeg.; Mertensia sendtneri (Boiss.) Janka; Mertensia serbica Janka; Moltkia sendtneri Boiss. (1856); Zwackhia aurea Sendtn.; Zwackhia sendtneri (Boiss.) K.Malý

Genus of flowering plants

Halacsya is a monotypic genus of flowering plants belonging to the family Boraginaceae. It only contains one species, Halacsya sendtneri (Boiss.) Dörfl.

It is native to the Balkan Peninsula and is found in Albania, Greece and the former Yugoslavia.

It has one known subspecies; Halacsya sendtneri subsp. devollensis F.K.Mey. (from Albania).

The genus name of Halacsya is in honour of Eugen von Halácsy (1842–1913), an Austrian physician and botanist of Hungarian descent. The Latin specific epithet of sendtneri refers to Otto Sendtner, (1813–1859) a German botanist and phytogeographer. Halacsya sendtneri was first described and published in Exsicc. (Herb. Norm.) Vol.44 on page 103, n.º 4364 in 1902.

== Culture ==
In 2020, the Republic of Kosovo issued a set of postage stamps with images of various flora including Halacsya sendtneri.
