= Cynanchica accrescens =

Scientific classification
- Kingdom: Plantae
- Clade: Embryophytes
- Clade: Tracheophytes
- Clade: Spermatophytes
- Clade: Angiosperms
- Clade: Eudicots
- Clade: Asterids
- Order: Gentianales
- Family: Rubiaceae
- Genus: Cynanchica
- Species: C. accrescens

Binomial name
- Cynanchica accrescens (Klokov) P.Caputo & Del Guacchio

Synonyms
- Asperula accrescens Klokov

Species of flowering plant

Cynanchica accrescens, commonly known as woodruff, is a deciduous species of perennial groundcover, and a flowering plant in the family Rubiaceae. It is endemic to Transcaucasus and was first named by Klokov.

== Description ==
Cynanchica accrescens appears as a small green moss-like plant, with small (1 in or 25 mm) pale pink flowers, on stems, it has a compact cushion of small, green, needle-like, leaves.

== Growth cycle ==
Cynanchica accrescens flowers around May–June, and grows best in a rock garden, trough or crevice.
