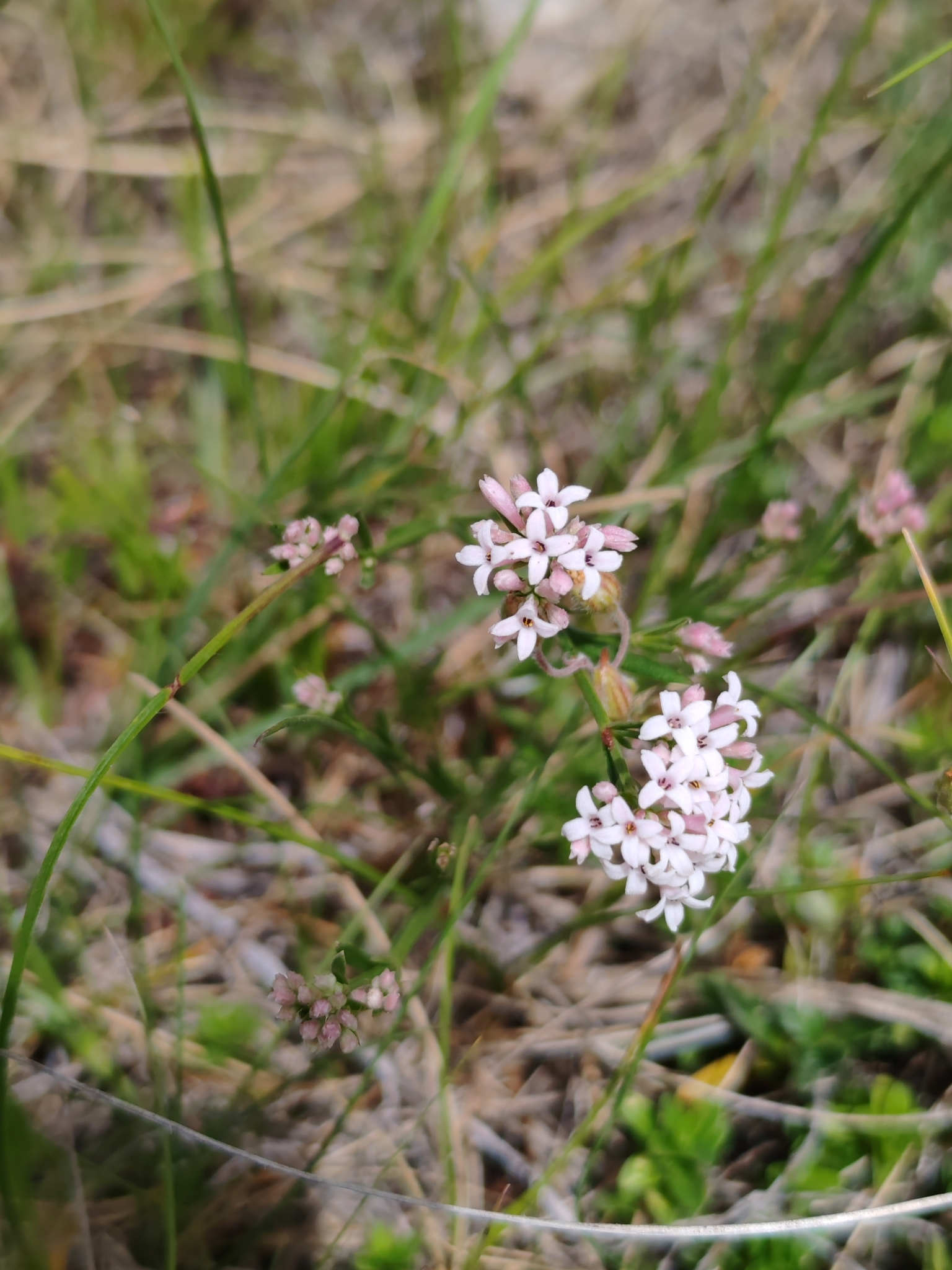
- Cynanchica beckiana

Scientific classification
- Kingdom: Plantae
- Clade: Embryophytes
- Clade: Tracheophytes
- Clade: Spermatophytes
- Clade: Angiosperms
- Clade: Eudicots
- Clade: Asterids
- Order: Gentianales
- Family: Rubiaceae
- Genus: Cynanchica; P.Caputo & Del Guacchio (2020)

= Cynanchica =

Genus of flowering plants in the coffee family

Cynanchica, commonly known as woodruff, is a genus of flowering plants in the family Rubiaceae. It contains 73 species and has a wide distribution area from Europe, northern Africa, the Middle East and central Asia. The genus was erected in 2020 to accommodate species split from the genus Asperula.

== Species ==
- Cynanchica abbreviata (Halácsy) P.Caputo & Del Guacchio
- Cynanchica abchasica (V.I.Krecz.) P.Caputo & Del Guacchio
- Cynanchica accrescens (Klokov) P.Caputo & Del Guacchio
- Cynanchica affinis (Boiss. & A.Huet) P.Caputo & Del Guacchio
- Cynanchica aristata (L.f.) P.Caputo & Del Guacchio
- Cynanchica beckiana (Degen) P.Caputo & Del Guacchio
- Cynanchica biebersteinii (V.I.Krecz.) P.Caputo & Del Guacchio
- Cynanchica boissieri (Heldr. ex Boiss.) P.Caputo & Del Guacchio
- Cynanchica borbasiana (Korica) P.Caputo & Del Guacchio
- Cynanchica bornmuelleri (Velen. ex Bornm.) P.Caputo & Del Guacchio
- Cynanchica brachyphylla (Trigas & Iatroú) P.Caputo & Del Guacchio
- Cynanchica breviflora (Boiss.) P.Caputo & Del Guacchio
- Cynanchica bryoides (Stapf) P.Caputo & Del Guacchio
- Cynanchica capitellata (Hausskn. & Bornm.) P.Caputo & Del Guacchio
- Cynanchica carpatica (Morariu) P.Caputo & Del Guacchio
- Cynanchica crassifolia (L.) P.Caputo & Del Guacchio
- Cynanchica cristata (Sommier & Levier) P.Caputo & Del Guacchio
- Cynanchica daphneola (O.Schwarz) P.Caputo & Del Guacchio
- Cynanchica deficiens (Viv.) P.Caputo & Del Guacchio
- Cynanchica diminuta (Klokov) P.Caputo & Del Guacchio
- Cynanchica garganica (Huter, Porta & Rigo ex Ehrend. & Krendl) P.Caputo & Del Guacchio
- Cynanchica glareosa (Ehrend.) P.Caputo & Del Guacchio
- Cynanchica graveolens (M.Bieb. ex Schult. & Schult.f.) P.Caputo & Del Guacchio
- Cynanchica gussonei (Boiss.) P.Caputo & Del Guacchio
- Cynanchica icarica (Ehrend. & Schönb.-Tem.) P.Caputo & Del Guacchio
- Cynanchica idaea (Halácsy) P.Caputo & Del Guacchio
- Cynanchica inopinata (Schönb.-Tem.) P.Caputo & Del Guacchio
- Cynanchica intersita (Klokov) P.Caputo & Del Guacchio
- Cynanchica × jordanii (E.P.Perrier & Songeon) P.Caputo & Del Guacchio
- Cynanchica kemulariae (Manden.) P.Caputo & Del Guacchio
- Cynanchica lactea (Huter, Porta & Rigo ex Galasso) P.Caputo & Del Guacchio
- Cynanchica lilaciflora (Boiss.) P.Caputo & Del Guacchio
- Cynanchica lipskyana (V.I.Krecz.) P.Caputo & Del Guacchio
- Cynanchica litardierei (Humbert) P.Caputo & Del Guacchio
- Cynanchica littoralis (Sm.) P.Caputo & Del Guacchio
- Cynanchica lutea (Sm.) P.Caputo & Del Guacchio
- Cynanchica lycia (Stapf) P.Caputo & Del Guacchio
- Cynanchica malevonensis (Ehrend. & Schönb.-Tem.) P.Caputo & Del Guacchio
- Cynanchica markothensis (Klokov) P.Caputo & Del Guacchio
- Cynanchica mungieri (Boiss. & Heldr.) P.Caputo & Del Guacchio
- Cynanchica naufraga (Ehrend. & Gutermann) P.Caputo & Del Guacchio
- Cynanchica neilreichii (Beck) P.Caputo & Del Guacchio
- Cynanchica nitida (Sm.) P.Caputo & Del Guacchio
- Cynanchica oetaea (Boiss.) P.Caputo & Del Guacchio
- Cynanchica ophiolitica (Ehrend.) P.Caputo & Del Guacchio
- Cynanchica paui (Font Quer) P.Caputo & Del Guacchio
- Cynanchica pedicellata (Klokov) P.Caputo & Del Guacchio
- Cynanchica peloritana (C.Brullo, Brullo, Giusso & Scuderi) P.Caputo & Del Guacchio
- Cynanchica pestalozzae (Boiss.) P.Caputo & Del Guacchio
- Cynanchica pinifolia (Boiss.) P.Caputo & Del Guacchio
- Cynanchica pontica (Boiss.) P.Caputo & Del Guacchio
- Cynanchica puberula (Halácsy & Sint.) P.Caputo & Del Guacchio
- Cynanchica pulvinaris (Heldr. ex Boiss.) P.Caputo & Del Guacchio
- Cynanchica pumila (Moris) P.Caputo & Del Guacchio
- Cynanchica pyrenaica (L.) P.Caputo & Del Guacchio
- Cynanchica rigidula (Halácsy) P.Caputo & Del Guacchio
- Cynanchica rumelica (Boiss.) P.Caputo & Del Guacchio
- Cynanchica rupicola (Jord.) P.Caputo & Del Guacchio
- Cynanchica samia (Christod. & T.Georgiadis) P.Caputo & Del Guacchio
- Cynanchica setulosa (Boiss.) P.Caputo & Del Guacchio
- Cynanchica sintenisii (Asch. ex Bornm.) P.Caputo & Del Guacchio
- Cynanchica staliana (Vis.) P.Caputo & Del Guacchio
- Cynanchica stricta (Boiss.) P.Caputo & Del Guacchio
- Cynanchica suberosa (Sm.) P.Caputo & Del Guacchio
- Cynanchica suffruticosa (Boiss. & Heldr.) P.Caputo & Del Guacchio
- Cynanchica supina (M.Bieb.) P.Caputo & Del Guacchio
- Cynanchica tenella (Heuff. ex Degen) P.Caputo & Del Guacchio
- Cynanchica tenuifolia (Boiss.) P.Caputo & Del Guacchio
- Cynanchica tephrocarpa (Czern. ex Popov & Chrshan.) P.Caputo & Del Guacchio
- Cynanchica tragacanthoides (Brullo) P.Caputo & Del Guacchio
- Cynanchica visianii (Korica) P.Caputo & Del Guacchio
- Cynanchica wettsteinii (Adamovic) P.Caputo & Del Guacchio
- Cynanchica woloszczakii (Korica) P.Caputo & Del Guacchio
- Cynanchica woronowii (V.I.Krecz.) P.Caputo & Del Guacchio
