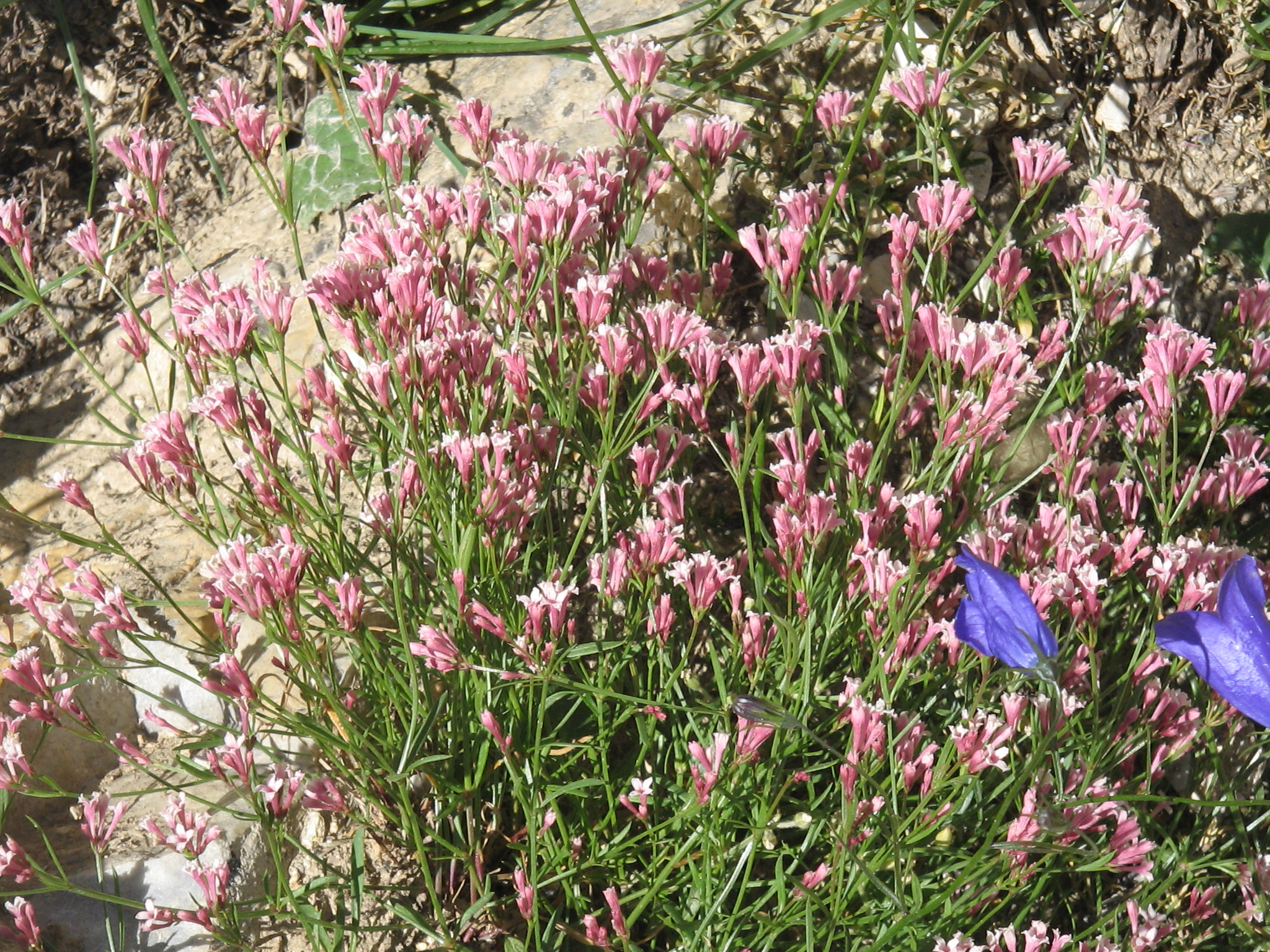

Scientific classification
- Kingdom: Plantae
- Clade: Tracheophytes
- Clade: Angiosperms
- Clade: Eudicots
- Clade: Asterids
- Order: Gentianales
- Family: Rubiaceae
- Genus: Cynanchica
- Species: C. rupicola

Binomial name
- Cynanchica rupicola (Jord.) P.Caputo & Del Guacchio

Synonyms
- List: Asperula cynanchica subsp. rupicola (Jord.) Berher; Asperula cynanchica var. rupicola (Jord.) St.-Lag. & Cariot; Asperula cynanchica subvar. rupicola (Jord.) Nyman; Asperula rupicola Jord.

= Cynanchica rupicola =

Species of plant

Cynanchica rupicola is a species of flowering plant in the coffee family Rubiaceae. It was first described in 1852 and is endemic to France and Italy.
