= Allium candargyi =

Lesbos garlic Λέσβος Γέλις

Scientific classification
- Kingdom: Plantae
- Clade: Tracheophytes
- Clade: Angiosperms
- Clade: Monocots
- Order: Asparagales
- Family: Amaryllidaceae
- Subfamily: Allioideae
- Genus: Allium
- Subgenus: A. subg. Allium
- Species: A. candargyi

Binomial name
- Allium candargyi Karavok. & Tzanoud.

Species of flowering plant

Allium candargyi is a plant species endemic to Greece, known only from the Island of Lesbos (Λέσβος) in the Aegean Sea.

Allium candargyi is a perennial bulb-forming herb producing an umbel of flowers.
