= Paeonia parnassica =

Conservation status
- Endangered (IUCN 3.1)

Scientific classification
- Kingdom: Plantae
- Clade: Tracheophytes
- Clade: Angiosperms
- Clade: Eudicots
- Order: Saxifragales
- Family: Paeoniaceae
- Genus: Paeonia
- Species: P. parnassica

Binomial name
- Paeonia parnassica Tzanoud.

Species of flowering plant

Paeonia parnassica, the Greek peony, is a flowering plant in the family Paeoniaceae. It is native to the mountains of south-central Greece. This endangered perennial species is characterized by its dark, almost blackish-red flowers measuring 8–12 cm across, compound leaves with silvery-hairy undersides, and grows 35–65 centimetres tall. Endemic to Greece, it grows primarily on Mount Parnassus and Mount Helicon at elevations of 800–1300 metres, typically in forest clearings within Greek fir woodlands, damp meadows, and among limestone rocks. First formally described in 1977, the species flowers in May and June and features distinctive curled styles and two or three hairy carpels.

== Description ==
Paeonia parnassica is a perennial plant characterised by its numerous, elongated, spindle-shaped roots. The plant typically grows between 35 and 65 centimetres tall, with densely hairy, single-flowered green stems. Its leaves are compound and typically divided into three parts, each densely covered with fine hairs beneath, giving them a silvery appearance. The central leaflet of each leaf can be entire or deeply split into two or three lobes, and the total number of leaflets and lobes ranges from nine to thirteen. Leaflets are usually obovate to narrowly elliptic or lanceolate in shape, with pointed or shortly tapering tips, and narrow bases. When young, the leaves hav a purple hue, becoming green above and greyish-green beneath as they mature.

The flowers of P. parnassica are dark, almost blackish-red, measuring between 8 and 12 cm across. Each flower has between nine and twelve petals, which range from obovate to nearly circular in shape. The flower's filaments are purplish, and it has two or three hairy carpels. Its styles are curled, with stigmatic surfaces extending almost to their base. The species has a chromosome count of 2n=20.

== Habitat and distribution ==
Paeonia parnassica is endemic to Greece, where it is found primarily on Mount Parnassus in the region of Phocis and on Mount Helicon in Boeotia. The species commonly grows in forest clearings and open spaces within Greek fir (Abies cephalonica) woodlands. It is also present in damp grassy meadows and among limestone rocks, typically at elevations ranging from 800 to 1300 metres above sea level. The flowering period of P. parnassica occurs in May and June.

== Taxonomy ==
Paeonia parnassica was first described by the Greek botanist Dimitris Tzanoudakis in his 1977 PhD thesis, based on specimens collected from Mount Parnassus in Greece. The formal description was later published in 1984 in the work "Peonies of Greece" by botanists William T. Stearn and Peter Hadland Davis. The species epithet parnassica references Mount Parnassos, the type locality where the original specimens were collected. The type specimen was collected above the village of Agoriani at an elevation of about 1100 metres in fir forest (Abies) and is deposited at the herbarium of the University of Patras in Greece (UPA) and the herbarium at the Natural History Museum in London (BM). Previously, specimens of this species were classified under Paeonia peregrina var. latifolia by the botanist Pierre Edmond Boissier, based on collections made by the botanists Theodor von Heldreich and Theodoros G. Orphanides in the mid-19th century.
