= Cynanchica breviflora =

Scientific classification
- Kingdom: Plantae
- Clade: Tracheophytes
- Clade: Angiosperms
- Clade: Eudicots
- Clade: Asterids
- Order: Gentianales
- Family: Rubiaceae
- Genus: Cynanchica
- Species: C. breviflora

Binomial name
- Cynanchica breviflora (Boiss.) P.Caputo & Del Guacchio

Synonyms
- Asperula breviflora Boiss.

Species of flowering plant

Cynanchica breviflora is a species of flowering plant in the family Rubiaceae. It was described in 1849 and is endemic to Syria.
