= Cynanchica mungieri =

Scientific classification
- Kingdom: Plantae
- Clade: Embryophytes
- Clade: Tracheophytes
- Clade: Spermatophytes
- Clade: Angiosperms
- Clade: Eudicots
- Clade: Asterids
- Order: Gentianales
- Family: Rubiaceae
- Genus: Cynanchica
- Species: C. mungieri

Binomial name
- Cynanchica mungieri (Boiss. & Heldr.) P.Caputo & Del Guacchio

Synonyms
- Asperula lutea var. mungieri (Boiss. & Heldr.) Boiss.; Asperula lutea subsp. mungieri (Boiss. & Heldr.) Ehrend. & Krendl; Asperula mungieri Boiss. & Heldr.; Asperula mungieri var. trichophylla Halácsy

Species of flowering plant

Cynanchica mungieri is a species of flowering plant in the family Rubiaceae.

== Description ==
Cynanchica mungieri was first described in 1849 and is endemic to Greece.
