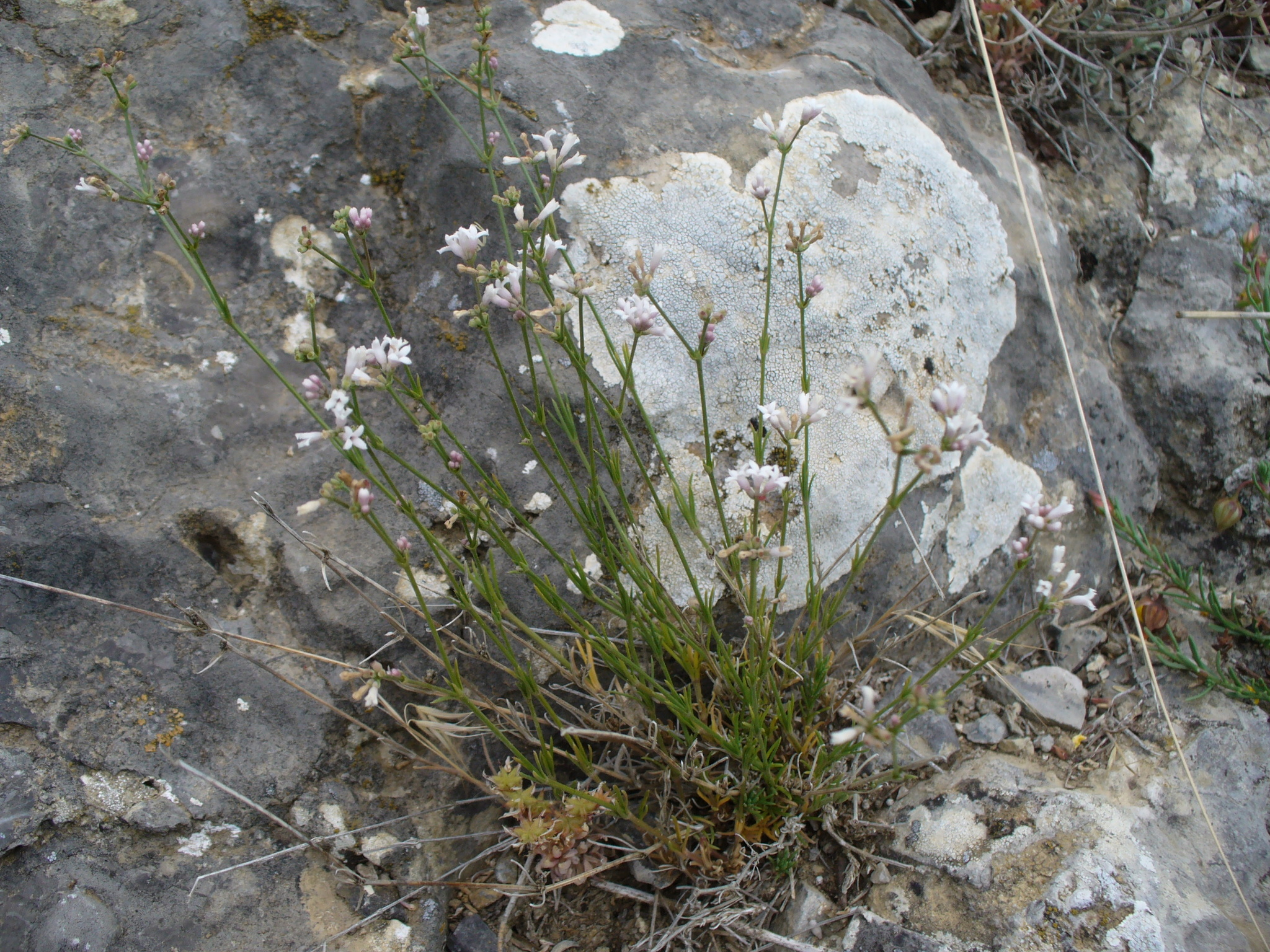

Scientific classification
- Kingdom: Plantae
- Clade: Embryophytes
- Clade: Tracheophytes
- Clade: Spermatophytes
- Clade: Angiosperms
- Clade: Eudicots
- Clade: Asterids
- Order: Gentianales
- Family: Rubiaceae
- Genus: Cynanchica
- Species: C. rumelica

Binomial name
- Cynanchica rumelica (Boiss.) P.Caputo & Del Guacchio

Synonyms
- List: Asperula affrena Klokov; Asperula attenuata Klokov; Asperula barthae Pénzes; Asperula cynanchica subsp. rumelica (Boiss.) Pjatunina; Asperula cynanchica subvar. montana (Waldst. & Kit. ex Willd.) Nyman; Asperula divergens Boiss.; Asperula graniticola Klokov; Asperula graveolens var. glabriflora Boiss.; Asperula hypanica Klokov; Asperula montana Waldst. & Kit. ex Willd.; Asperula rumelica Boiss.; Galium affrenum (Klokov) Ostapko

= Cynanchica rumelica =

Species of flowering plant

Cynanchica rumelica is a species of flowering plant in the family Rubiaceae. It was first described in 1856 and is endemic to Bulgaria, Greece, Romania, Russia, Turkey, and Ukraine.
