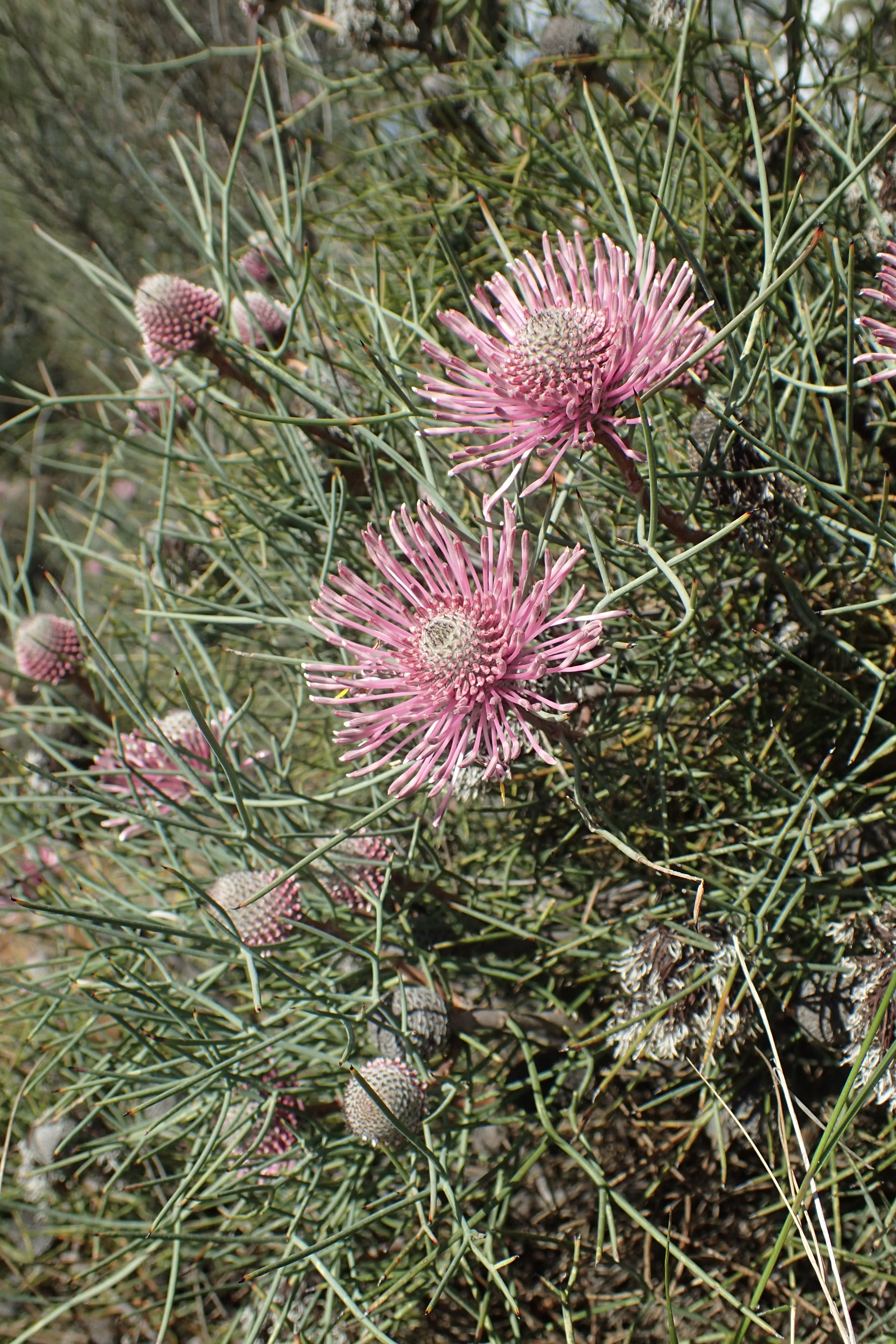
- Isopogon divergens

Scientific classification
- Kingdom: Plantae
- Clade: Tracheophytes
- Clade: Angiosperms
- Clade: Eudicots
- Order: Proteales
- Family: Proteaceae
- Genus: Isopogon
- Species: I. divergens

Binomial name
- Isopogon divergens R.Br.
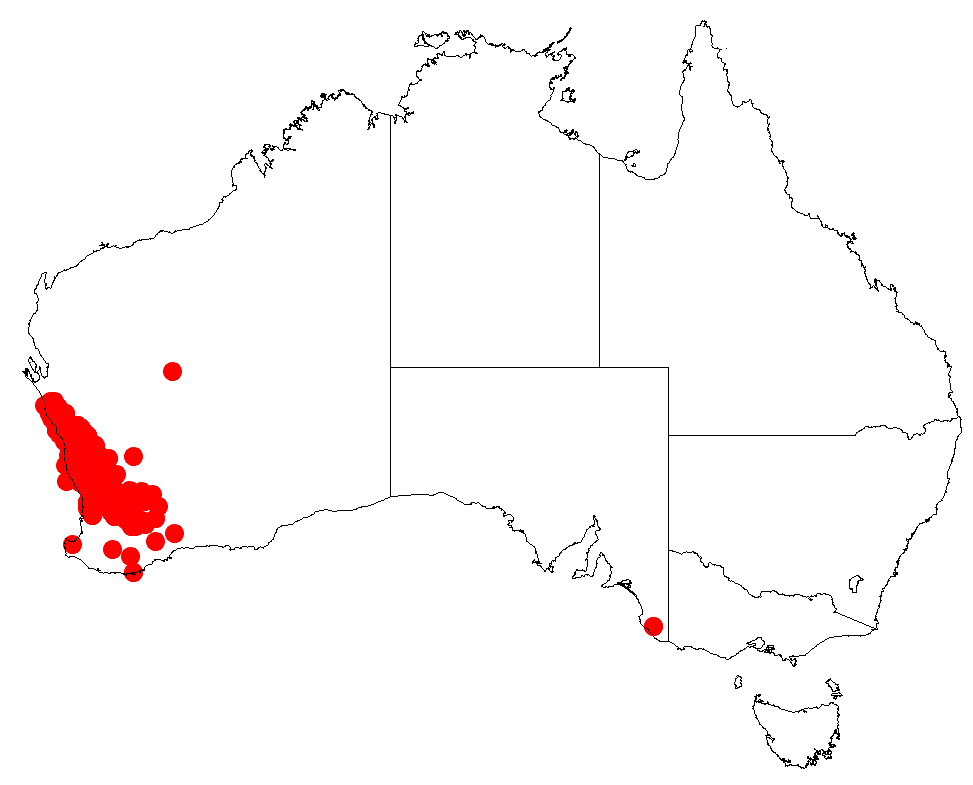
- Occurrence data from Australasian Virtual Herbarium

Synonyms
- Atylus divergens (R.Br.) Kuntze

= Isopogon divergens =

Spreading coneflower

Species of shrub endemic to Western Australia

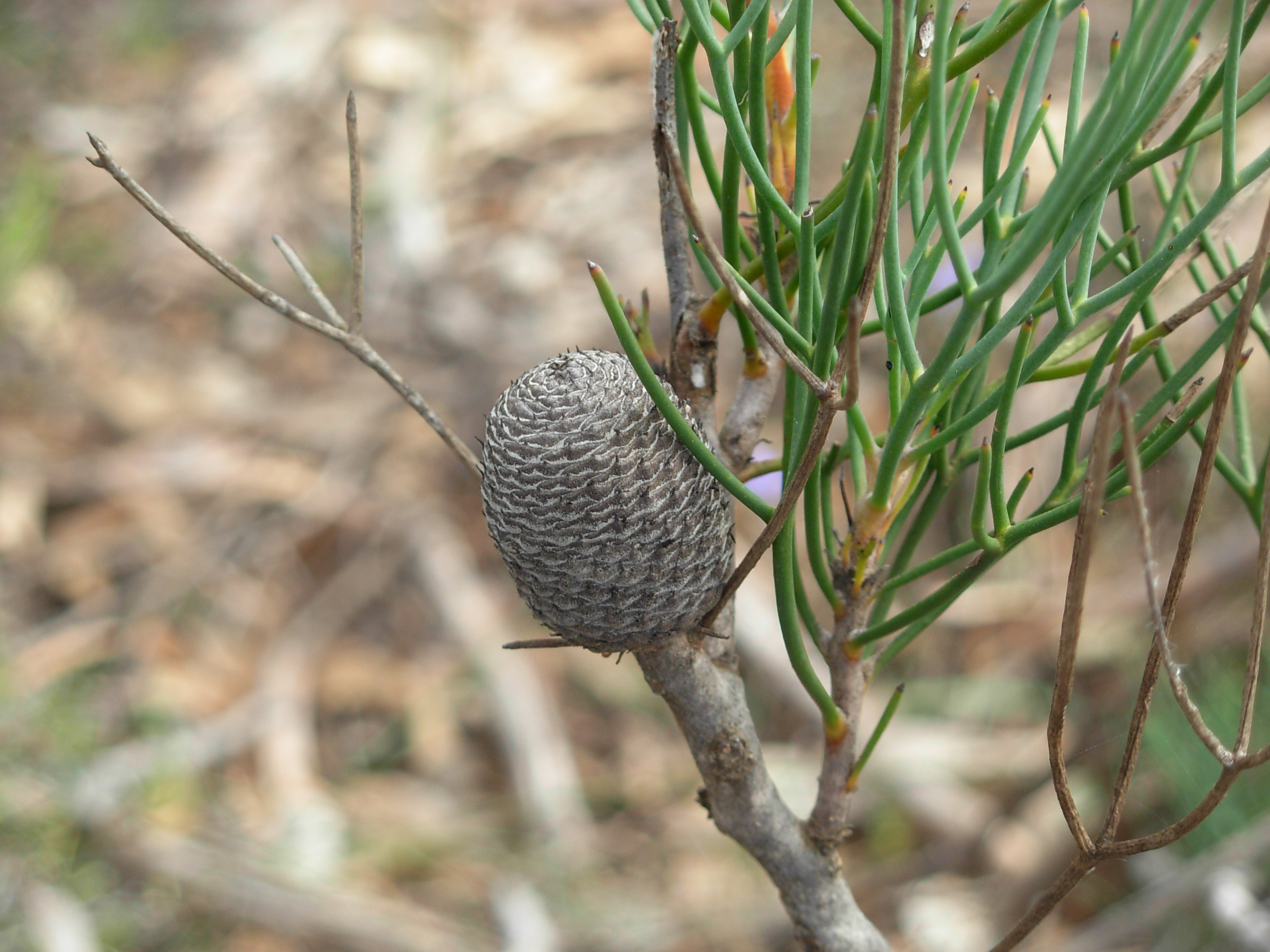
Fruiting cone in Drummond Nature Reserve

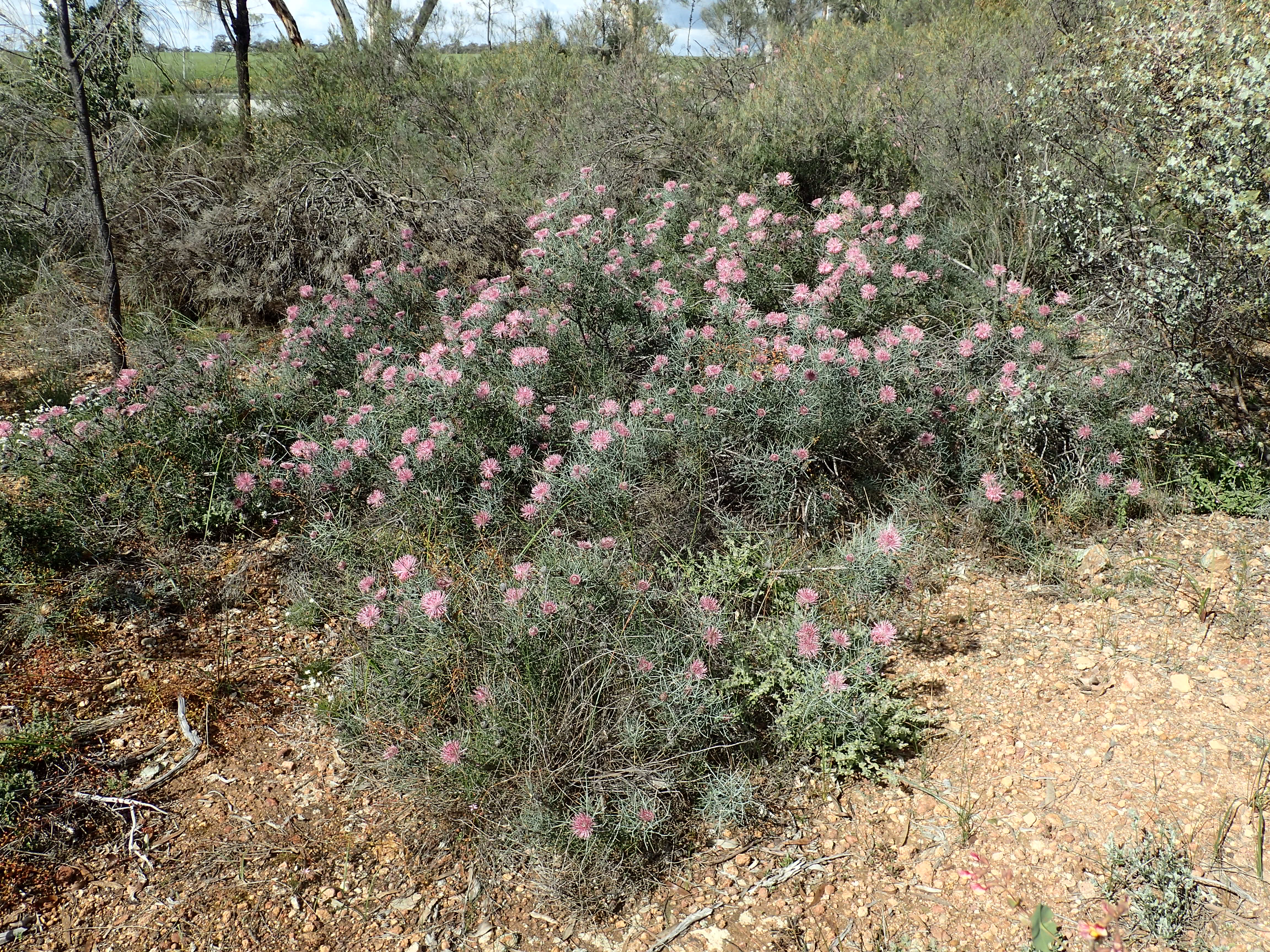
Habit in the Wallaby Hills Nature Reserve near York

Isopogon divergens, commonly known as spreading coneflower, is a species of plant in the family Proteaceae and is endemic to the south-west of Western Australia. It is a shrub with pinnate leaves and more or less spherical heads of glabrous pink flowers followed by an oval to cylindrical fruiting cone.

== Description ==
Isopogon divergens is a shrub that typically grows to a height of 0.3–2 m (1 ft 0 in – 6 ft 7 in) and has reddish brown branchlets. The leaves are 50–150 mm (2.0–5.9 in) long on a petiole up to 56 mm (2.2 in) long, pinnate or bipinnate with cylindrical leaflets 1–1.5 mm (0.039–0.059 in) wide. The flowers are arranged in spherical, oblong or oval, sessile heads 40–45 mm (1.6–1.8 in) long in diameter with egg-shaped involucral bracts at the base. The flowers are about 15–25 mm (0.59–0.98 in) long, pink, often tinted with mauve and are glabrous. Flowering occurs from August to October and the fruit is a hairy oval nut, fused with others in a spherical cone 15–25 mm (0.59–0.98 in) long.

== Taxonomy ==
Isopogon divergens was first formally described in 1830 by Robert Brown in the Supplementum to his Prodromus Florae Novae Hollandiae et Insulae Van Diemen from specimens collected in 1827 near the Swan River, by Charles Fraser.

== Distribution and habitat ==
Spreading coneflower grows in shrubland and heath and is widely distributed between the Murchison River and Lake Grace in the Avon Wheatbelt, Geraldton Sandplains, Jarrah Forest, Mallee and Swan Coastal Plain biogeographic regions in the south-west of Western Australia.

== Conservation status ==
Isopogon divergens is classified as "not threatened" by the Government of Western Australia Department of Parks and Wildlife.
