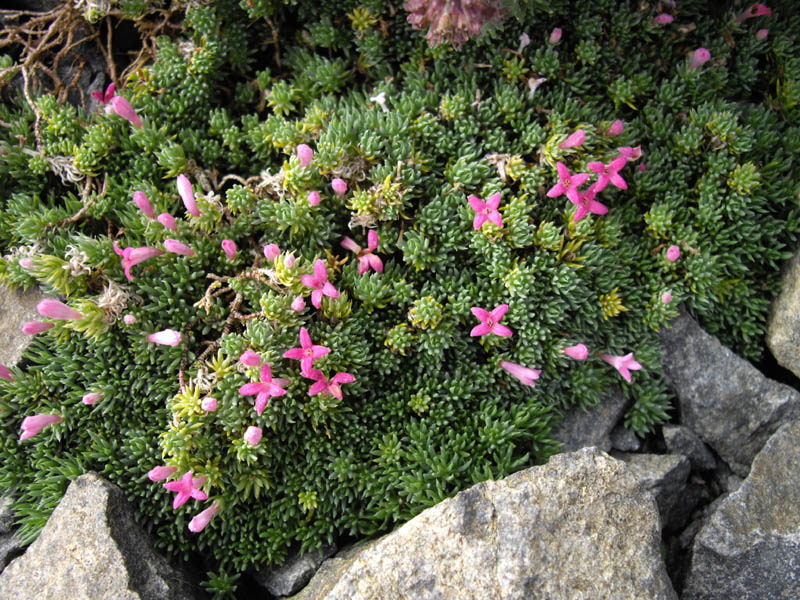

Scientific classification
- Kingdom: Plantae
- Clade: Tracheophytes
- Clade: Angiosperms
- Clade: Eudicots
- Clade: Asterids
- Order: Gentianales
- Family: Rubiaceae
- Genus: Cynanchica
- Species: C. nitida

Binomial name
- Cynanchica nitida (Sm.) P.Caputo & Del Guacchio (2020)

Subspecies
- 4; see text

Synonyms
- Asperula nitida Sm. (1806)

= Cynanchica nitida =

Species of plant

Cynanchica nitida is a species of flowering plant in the family Rubiaceae. It is a subshrub native to Greece's east Aegean Islands and to Turkey.

Four subspecies are accepted.

- Cynanchica nitida subsp. hirtella (Boiss.) P.Caputo & Del Guacchio – western and central Turkey
- Cynanchica nitida subsp. mytilinica (Ehrend.) P.Caputo & Del Guacchio – Lesbos
- Cynanchica nitida subsp. nitida – northwestern Turkey (Uludağ)
- Cynanchica nitida subsp. subcapitellata (Ehrend.) P.Caputo & Del Guacchio – northern Turkey

The species was first described as Asperula nitida by James Edward Smith in 1806. In 2020 it was placed in genus Cynanchica as Cynanchica nitida.
