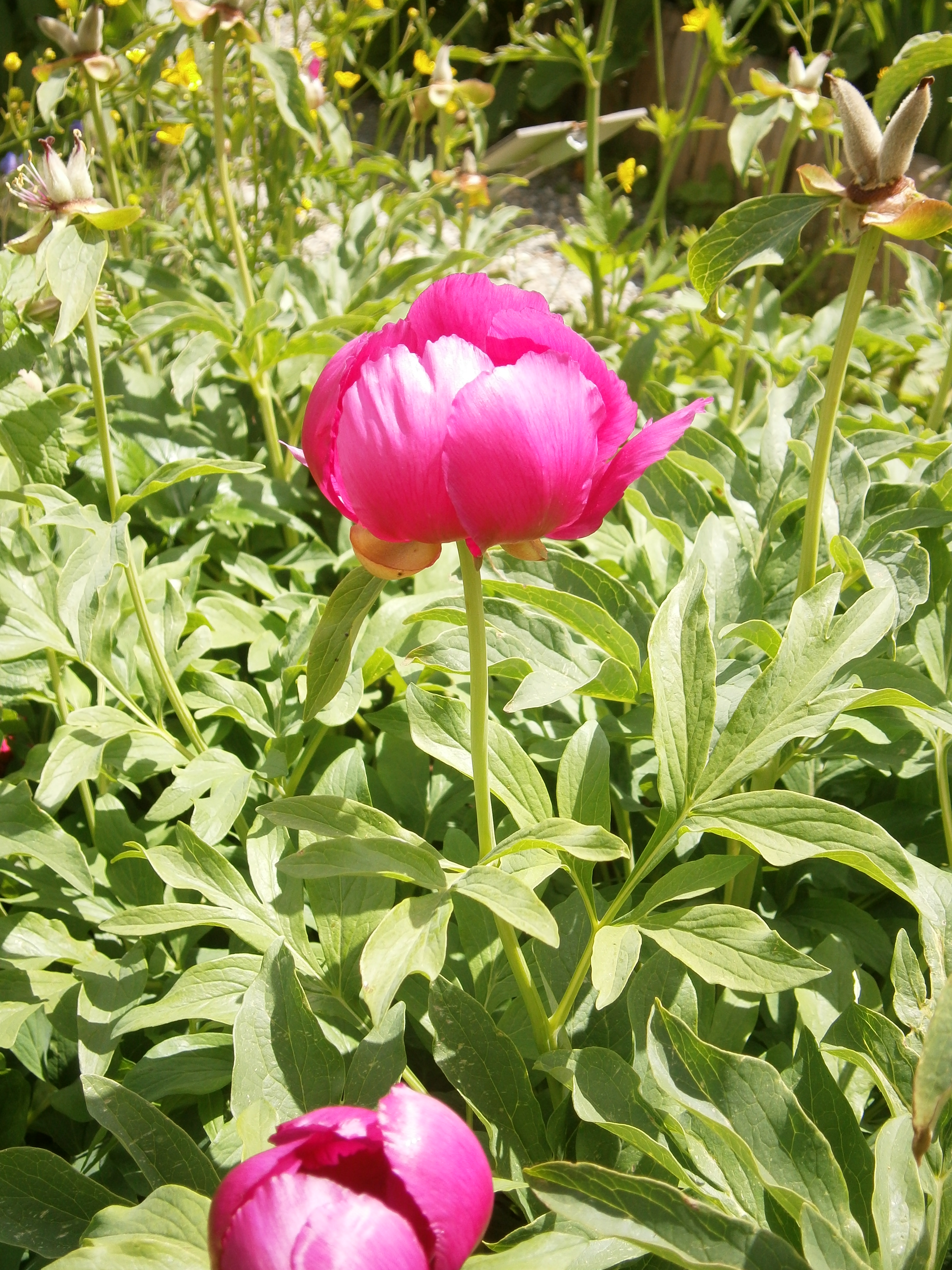

Scientific classification
- Kingdom: Plantae
- Clade: Tracheophytes
- Clade: Angiosperms
- Clade: Eudicots
- Order: Saxifragales
- Family: Paeoniaceae
- Genus: Paeonia
- Species: P. arietina

Binomial name
- Paeonia arietina G.Anderson

Synonyms
- Paeonia bakeri Lynch; Paeonia cretica Sabine ex Lindl.; Paeonia mascula subsp. arietina (G.Anderson) Cullen & Heywood; Paeonia officinalis subsp. arietina (G.Anderson) N.G.Passal.

= Paeonia arietina =

Species of flowering plant

Paeonia arietina, also known as the ram's horn peony, is a species of flowering plant within the family Paeoniaceae.

== Description ==
Paeonia arietina is a perennial species. Stems can range from 30 to 70 cm tall and usually possess glandular hairs. Flowers are solitary and rose in colour, with yellow anthers.

== Distribution and habitat ==
Paeonia arietina is native to: Albania, Bosnia-Herzegovina, Italy, North Caucasus, Romania, Turkey, Yugoslavia.

Paeonia arietina can be found in oak or coniferous woodlands, forest clearings and pastures. This species can be found at altitudes ranging from 300 to 2100 meters above sea level. It can grow on both limestone and granite soils, which suggests the species is adaptable to both acidic and alkaline soils.
