= Kenopleurum =

Scientific classification
- Kingdom: Plantae
- Clade: Tracheophytes
- Clade: Angiosperms
- Clade: Eudicots
- Clade: Asterids
- Order: Apiales
- Family: Apiaceae
- Genus: Kenopleurum; Candargy
- Species: K. virosum

Binomial name
- Kenopleurum virosum Candargy

Genus of flowering plants

Kenopleurum virosum is a species of flowering plant in the carrot family, Apiaceae. It is the sole species in genus Kenopleurum. It is a perennial native to the eastern portion of Lesbos, a Greek island in the eastern Aegean Sea.
