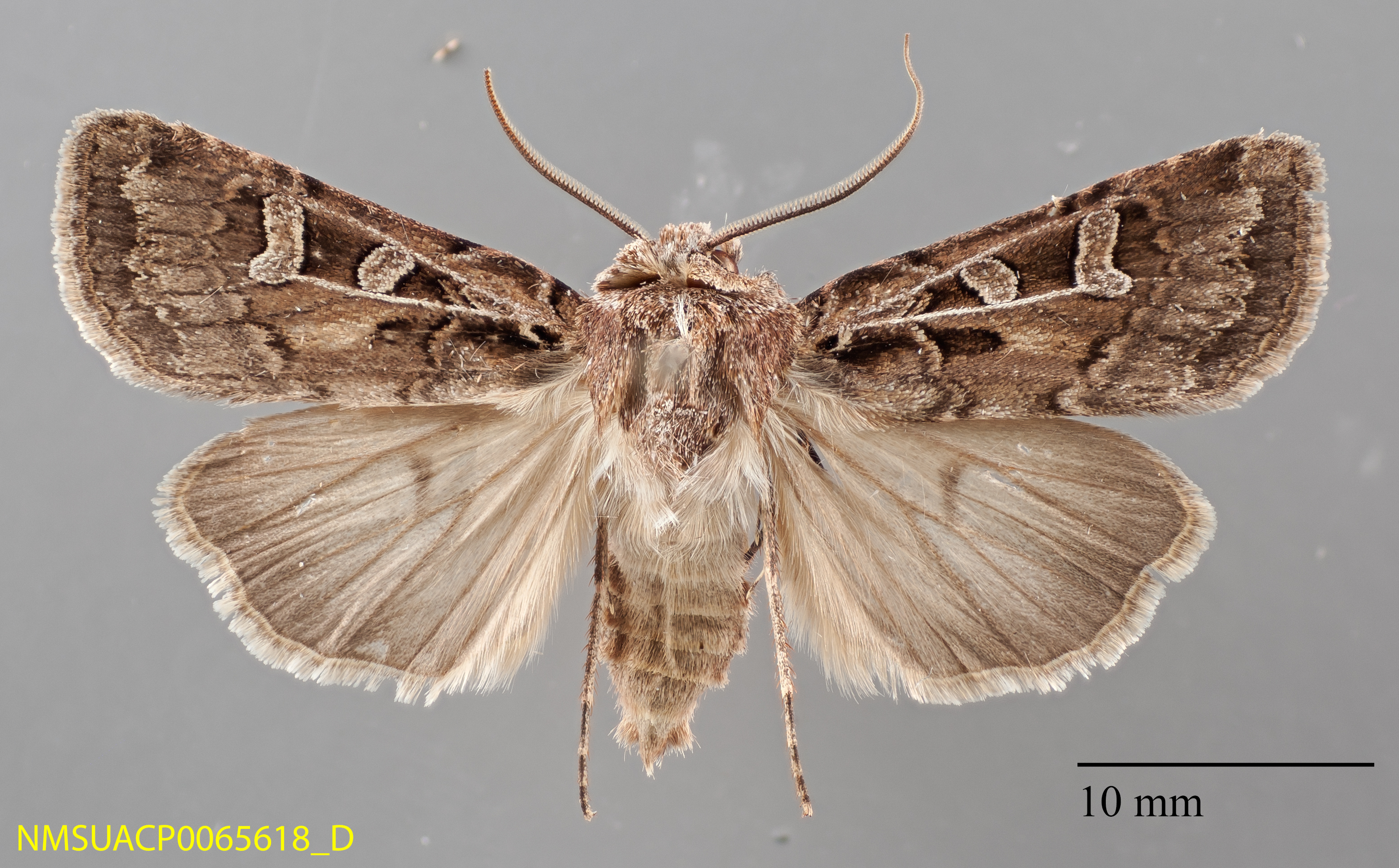

Scientific classification
- Kingdom: Animalia
- Phylum: Arthropoda
- Class: Insecta
- Order: Lepidoptera
- Superfamily: Noctuoidea
- Family: Noctuidae
- Genus: Euxoa
- Species: E. divergens

Binomial name
- Euxoa divergens (Walker, [1857])

Synonyms
- Agrotis divergens Walker, [1857]; Agrotis versipellis Grote, 1875; Carneades fusimacula Smith, 1891; Carneades fusimacula Smith, 1902; Agrotis abar Strecker, 1899; Carneades factoris Smith, 1900

= Euxoa divergens =

Species of moth

Euxoa divergens, the divergent dart, is a moth of the family Noctuidae. The species was first described by Francis Walker in 1857. It is found in North America from Newfoundland to Alaska, south to New York and Michigan in the east, and in the mountains of the west, south to New Mexico, Arizona and California.

The wingspan is 31–35 mm. Adults are on wing from May to September. There is one generation per year.
