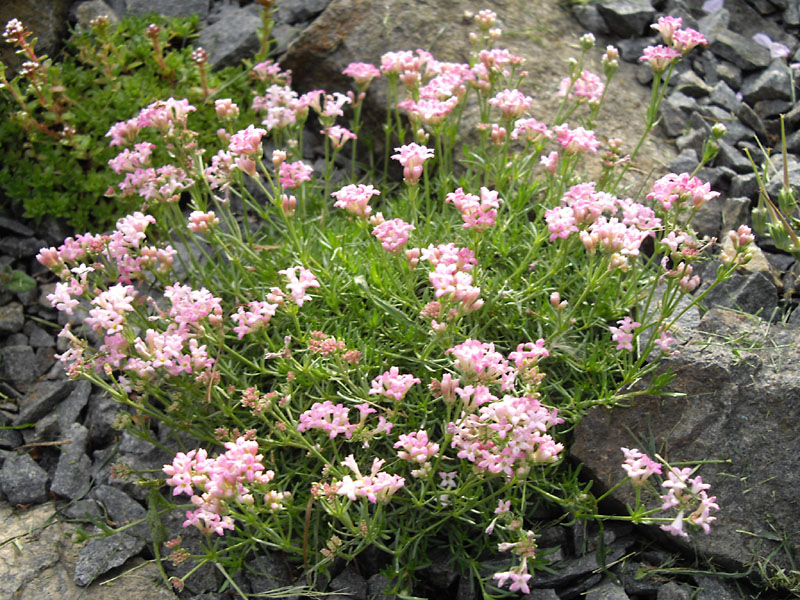

Scientific classification
- Kingdom: Plantae
- Clade: Tracheophytes
- Clade: Angiosperms
- Clade: Eudicots
- Clade: Asterids
- Order: Gentianales
- Family: Rubiaceae
- Genus: Cynanchica
- Species: C. lilaciflora

Binomial name
- Cynanchica lilaciflora (Boiss.) P.Caputo & Del Guacchio (2020)

Subspecies
- 5; see text

Synonyms
- Asperula lilaciflora Boiss. (1843)

= Cynanchica lilaciflora =

Species of plant in the madder family

Cynanchica lilaciflora is a species of flowering plant in the family Rubiaceae. It is a subshrub native to Turkey and to Greece's east Aegean islands.

== Taxonomy ==
The species was first described as Asperula lilaciflora in 1843 by Pierre Edmond Boissier. In 2020 it was placed in genus Cynanchica as Cynanchica lilaciflora.

== Subspecies ==
Six subspecies are accepted.

- Cynanchica lilaciflora subsp. coa (Rech.f.) P.Caputo & Del Guacchio – Kor
- Cynanchica lilaciflora subsp. lilaciflora – western Turkey
- Cynanchica lilaciflora subsp. mutensis (Schönb.-Tem.) P.Caputo & Del Guacchio – southern Turkey (Içel)
- Cynanchica lilaciflora subsp. phrygia (Bornm.) P.Caputo & Del Guacchio – eastern Aegean islands and western and west-central Turkey
- Cynanchica lilaciflora subsp. runemarkii (Ehrend. & Schönb.-Tem.) P.Caputo & Del Guacchio – eastern Aegean islands
