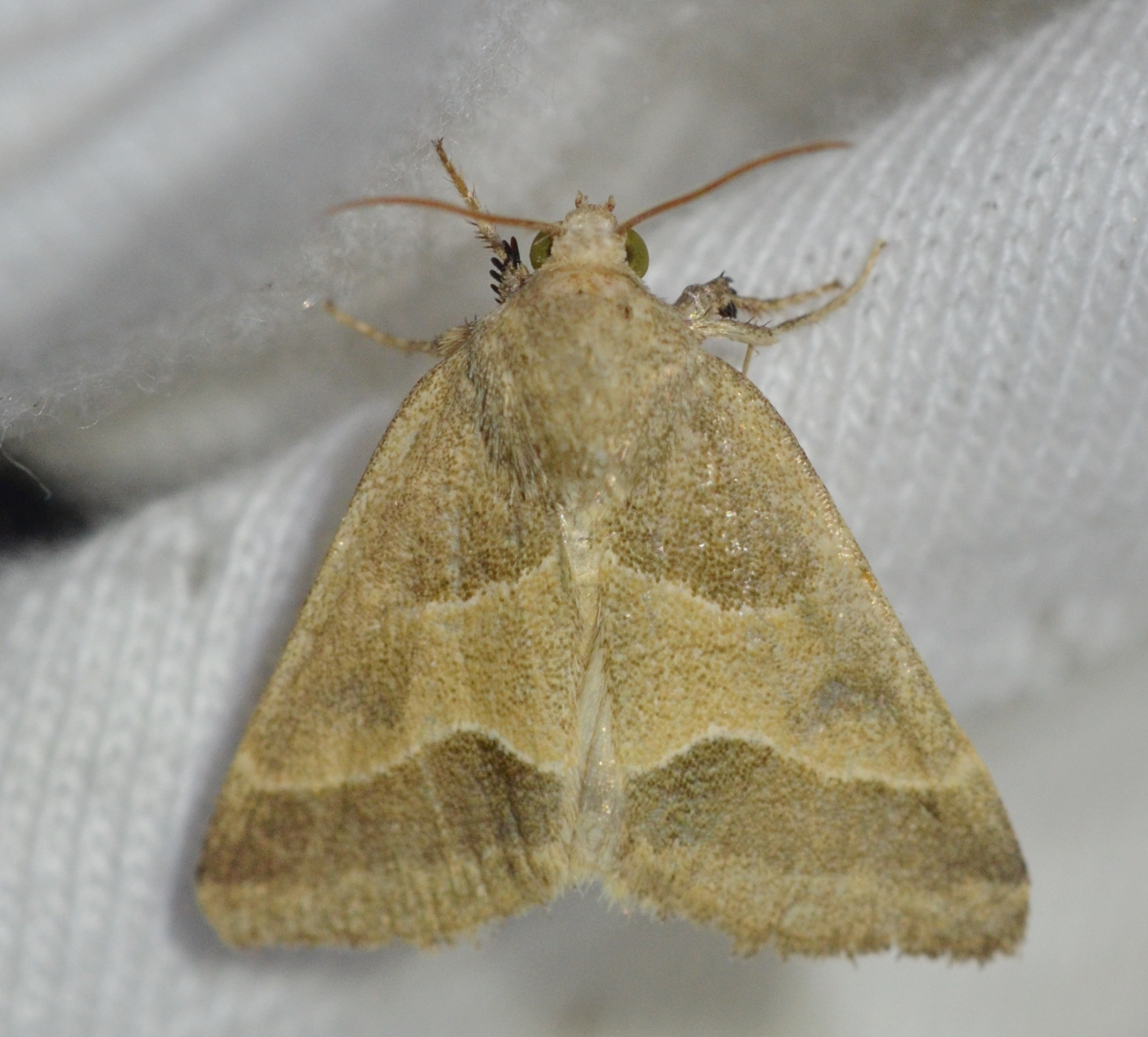

Scientific classification
- Kingdom: Animalia
- Phylum: Arthropoda
- Class: Insecta
- Order: Lepidoptera
- Superfamily: Noctuoidea
- Family: Noctuidae
- Genus: Schinia
- Species: S. gracilenta

Binomial name
- Schinia gracilenta Hübner, 1818

Synonyms
- Schinia bifascia Hübner, 1818; Heliothis imperspicua Strecker, 1876; Anthophila divergens Walker, 1858; Schinia digitalis Smith, 1891

= Schinia gracilenta =

Species of moth

Schinia gracilenta, the slender flower moth or iva flower moth, is a moth of the family Noctuidae. The species was first described by Jacob Hübner in 1818. It is found from the US states of New York to Florida and Nebraska to Arizona. The species is listed as endangered in Connecticut.

Male

Female

The wingspan is about 28 mm. There is one generation per year.

The larvae feed on the Iva genus, and possibly Brickellia eupatorioides.
