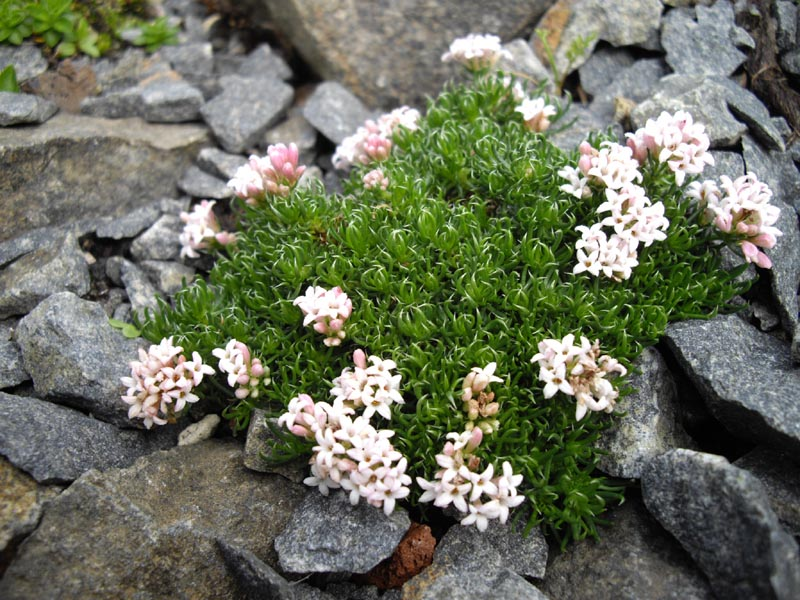

Scientific classification
- Kingdom: Plantae
- Clade: Embryophytes
- Clade: Tracheophytes
- Clade: Spermatophytes
- Clade: Angiosperms
- Clade: Eudicots
- Clade: Asterids
- Order: Gentianales
- Family: Rubiaceae
- Genus: Cynanchica
- Species: C. gussonei

Binomial name
- Cynanchica gussonei (Boiss.) P.Caputo & Del Guacchio

Synonyms
- List: Asperula cynanchica var. gussonei (Boiss.) Fiori; Asperula gussoneana Boiss. ex Ces., Pass. & Gibelli; Asperula gussonei Boiss.; Asperula suberosa Guss.

= Cynanchica gussonei =

Species of flowering plant

Cynanchica gussonei, also known as alpine woodruff, is a deciduous species of perennial groundcover, and a flowering plant in the family Rubiaceae. It was first described in 1831 and is endemic to Sicily.

== Description ==
Cynanchica gussonei appears as a small green moss-like plant, with small (1 in or 25 mm) stemless pale pink flowers, it has a compact cushion of small, dark green, needle-like, leaves.

== Growth cycle ==
Cynanchica gussonei flowers around May–June, and grows best in a rock garden, trough or crevice.

== History ==
Alpine woodruff was first named by Pierre Edmond Boissier
