= Abacetus divergens =

Scientific classification
- Domain: Eukaryota
- Kingdom: Animalia
- Phylum: Arthropoda
- Class: Insecta
- Order: Coleoptera
- Suborder: Adephaga
- Family: Carabidae
- Genus: Abacetus
- Species: A. divergens

Binomial name
- Abacetus divergens Tschitscherine, 1899

Species of beetle

Abacetus divergens is a species of ground beetle in the subfamily Pterostichinae. It was described by Tschitscherine in 1899.
