= Allium archeotrichon =

Ancient hairs onion

Scientific classification
- Kingdom: Plantae
- Clade: Tracheophytes
- Clade: Angiosperms
- Clade: Monocots
- Order: Asparagales
- Family: Amaryllidaceae
- Subfamily: Allioideae
- Genus: Allium
- Species: A. archeotrichon

Binomial name
- Allium archeotrichon Brullo, Pavone & Salmeri

Species of flowering plant

Allium archeotrichon is a species of onion endemic to the east Aegean islands – Rhodes, Tilos and Symi. It is a bulb-forming perennial with a scent resembling that of onions or garlic. It produces an umbel of flowers.
