= Eugen von Halácsy =

Austrian physician and botanist

Eugen von Halácsy, also known as Jenő Halácsy (11 December 1842 in Vienna – 16 December 1913 in Vienna) was an Austrian physician and botanist of Hungarian descent.

In 1865 he obtained his medical doctorate from the University of Vienna, and afterwards served under surgeon Johann von Dumreicher during the Austro-Prussian War (1866). In 1867 he settled as a general practitioner in Vienna.

He specialized in flora of the Balkan peninsula, and on several occasions traveled to Greece, where he worked closely with Theodor von Heldreich, director of the botanical garden in Athens. He issued two exsiccata-like series of herbarium specimens entitled Iter graecum a. 1888 and Iter graecum secundum a. 1893. In 1912 he received an honorary doctorate from the University of Athens. Halácsy is remembered for his three-volume synopsis on Greek flora titled "Conspectus florae Graecae" (1900-1908; Vol. I, Vol. II, Vol. II). His herbarium is preserved at the University of Vienna.

The plant genera Halacsya (from family Boraginaceae) and Halacsyella (in family Campanulaceae, now classed as a synonym of Edraianthus A.DC.) are named after him.

== Bibliography ==
- Books by Eugen von Halácsy on WorldCat
