= Dimitris Tzanoudakis =

Greek botanist

Dimitris Tzanoudakis (born 1950 in Greece) is a Greek botanist.

He studied biology at the University of Patras. He is currently employed as a professor of plant taxonomy and biogeography, at the University of Patras. He has published on topics like cytogenetics, phylogenetics, taxonomy, conservation and geography of plants, with emphasis on the genera Allium and Paeonia.

== Eponymy ==
The plant species Allium tzanoudakisanum is named after him.
