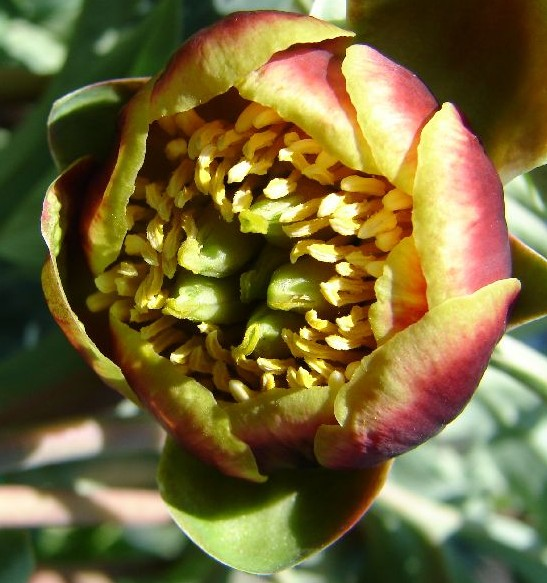

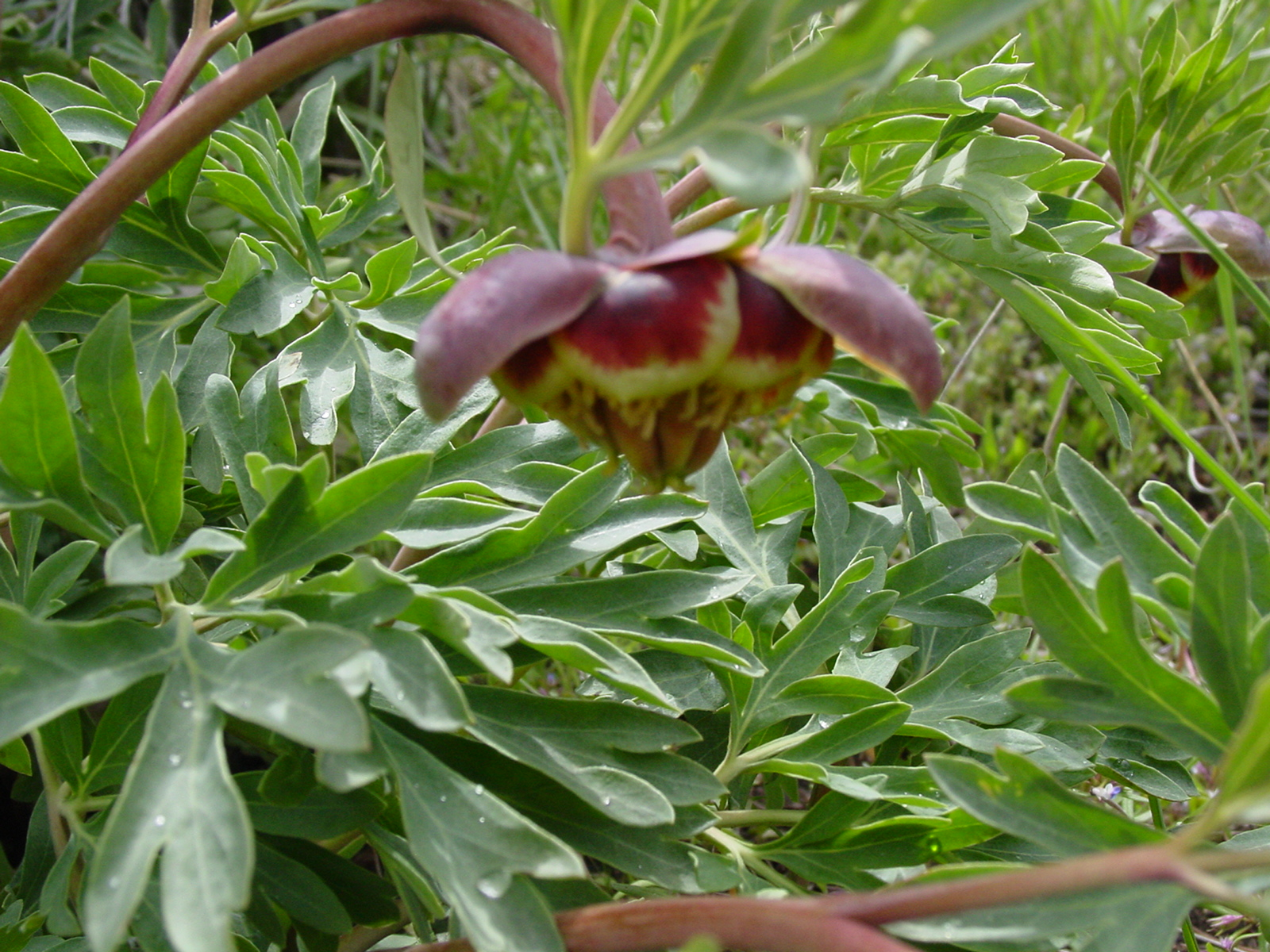

Scientific classification
- Kingdom: Plantae
- Clade: Tracheophytes
- Clade: Angiosperms
- Clade: Eudicots
- Order: Saxifragales
- Family: Paeoniaceae
- Genus: Paeonia
- Species: P. brownii

Binomial name
- Paeonia brownii Douglas ex Hook.

= Paeonia brownii =

Species of flowering plant

Paeonia brownii is a low to medium height, herbaceous perennial flowering plant in the family Paeoniaceae. It has compound, steely-gray, somewhat fleshy leaves and small drooping maroon flowers. Its vernacular name is Brown's peony, native peony or western peony. It is native to the western United States and usually grows at altitude, often as undergrowth in part-shade. The fleshy roots store food to carry the plant through the dry summers and produce new leaves and flowers the following spring.

== Description ==
Paeonia brownii is a glaucous, summer hibernating, perennial herbaceous plant of 25–40 cm (9.8–15.7 in) high with up to ten stems per plant, which grow from a large, fleshy root. Each pinkish stem is somewhat decumbent and has five to eight twice compound or deeply incised, bluish green, hairless, somewhat fleshy leaves which may develop purple-tinged edges when temperatures are low. The blades of the leaflets or segments are oval to inverted egg-shaped, 3-6 × 2–5 cm (0.79–1.97 in), with a clearly narrowed, stalk-like foot and a stump or rounded tip. The bisexual flowers are cup-shaped, 2–3 cm (0.79–1.18 in) when open, nodding, and are set individually at the tip of a branching stem, and bloom for 9–15 days. Flowering occurs from March to June (mostly mid-April to mid-May). The five or six overlapping sepals are a purplish green, cupped, and oval or almost circular, persist after flowering. The five to ten circular petals are usually shorter than the sepals, and grade in colour from brownish-maroon at the base, via wine red to greenish or yellowish on the edge. Each flower has 60-100 yellow stamens, consisting of filaments of 3–5 mm, that are topped by anthers of 2–4 mm long. These open in succession from the inside out shedding yellow pollen, starting from the second day. A disc consisting of about twelve fleshy cone-shaped greenish-yellow lobes of 2.5-3 mm high surrounds the two to six (mostly five) glabrous, initially yellow-green to ultimately yellow-red carpels, each having a short style topped by a curved stigma that forms a ridge. These are receptive during the first two days that the flower is open. Fertilised carpels mature into 2–4 cm (0.79–1.57 in) long follicles that have become leathery when ripe. About four seeds develop per follicle, which are yellowish-brown to black, round to oval and 6–11 mm in diameter. As all diploid peonies, Paeonia brownii has ten chromosomes (2n=10).

=== Differences from related species ===
Brown's peony is most closely related to, and closest in appearance to the California peony, with which it constitutes the section Onaepia. Common characters include having rather small drooping flowers, with small petals and a very prominent disk which usually consists of separate segments, while the seeds are cylindrical rather than ovoid. P. browniii can still be easily distinguished from P. californica however, the latter having 35–75 cm (14–30 in) high stems bearing seven to twelve leaves which are green, while the leaflet blade gradually eases into the leaflet stalk or lacks such a stalk all together, and the finest lobes are lanceolate or narrowly elliptic. P. brownii is usually only 20–40 cm (7.9–15.7 in) high, has six to eight glaucous leaves per stem that suddenly narrow at their base and the finest segments are egg-shaped. In P. californica the petals are egg-shaped, and about 1.5–2.5 cm (0.59–0.98 in) long, reaching beyond the sepals, while in P. brownii the petals are circular or wider than long, and about 0.75–1.5 cm (0.30–0.59 in) long, definitely shorter than the sepals.

== Taxonomy ==
Paeonia brownii was first described in 1829 by David Douglas in the Flora boreali-americana which was edited by Hooker. No synonyms for this scientific name are known. Paeonia californica has been regarded a subspecies of P. brownii, but there are several morphological differences, the environmental circumstances in which each grows are different and the distributions of both species do not overlap, so currently there seems to be consensus that both need to be regarded as separate species.

Paeonia brownii and P. californica together make up the section Onaepia of the genus Paeonia. Precise relationships between the three sections remain ambiguous, and can be represented by the following phylogenetic tree.

- genus Paeonia
  - section Paeoniae
    all Eurasian herbaceous peonies
  - section Moutan
    - - subsection Vaginatae
        all other tree peonies
      - subsection Delavayanae
        - P. ludlowii
        - P. delavayi
  - - section Onaepia
      - P. brownii
      - P. californica

=== Etymology ===
The species is named after Scottish botanist Robert Brown.

== Distribution ==
Brown's peony grows in open dry pine forests such as stands of ponderosa pine, in sagebrush, in mountain brush, and in aspen stands at elevations of 200–3,000 m (660–9,840 ft), where winters are long and cold, with little to no snow cover and the growing season is short. It occurs in northern California, Idaho, Montana, Nevada, Oregon, Utah, Washington and Wyoming. It is not native to Canada.

P. brownii is very specific when it comes to soil conditions. It will not thrive where the soil is excessively wet, nor if the soil becomes too dry. It performs best in well-drained situations.

== Ecology ==
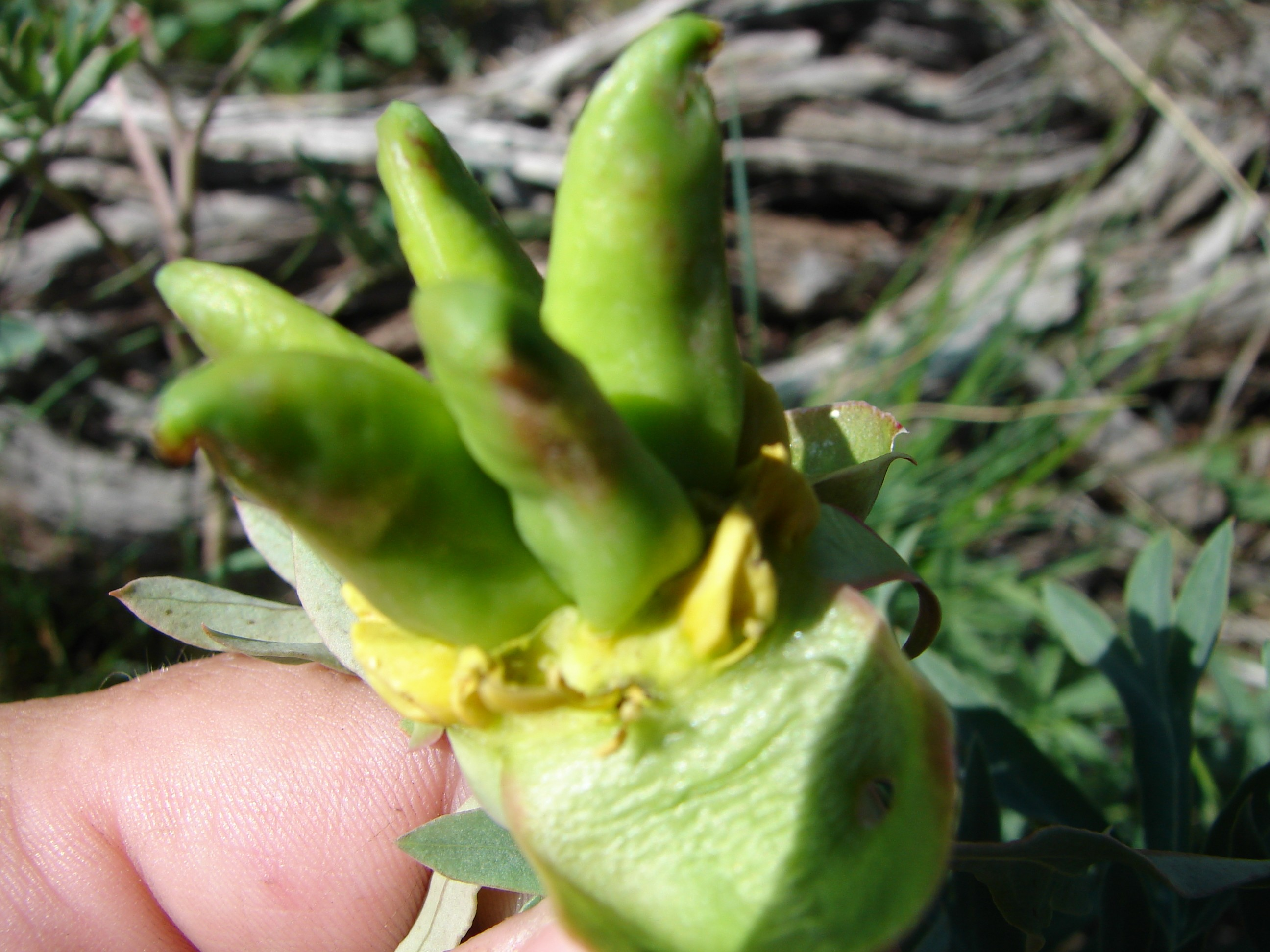
fruits

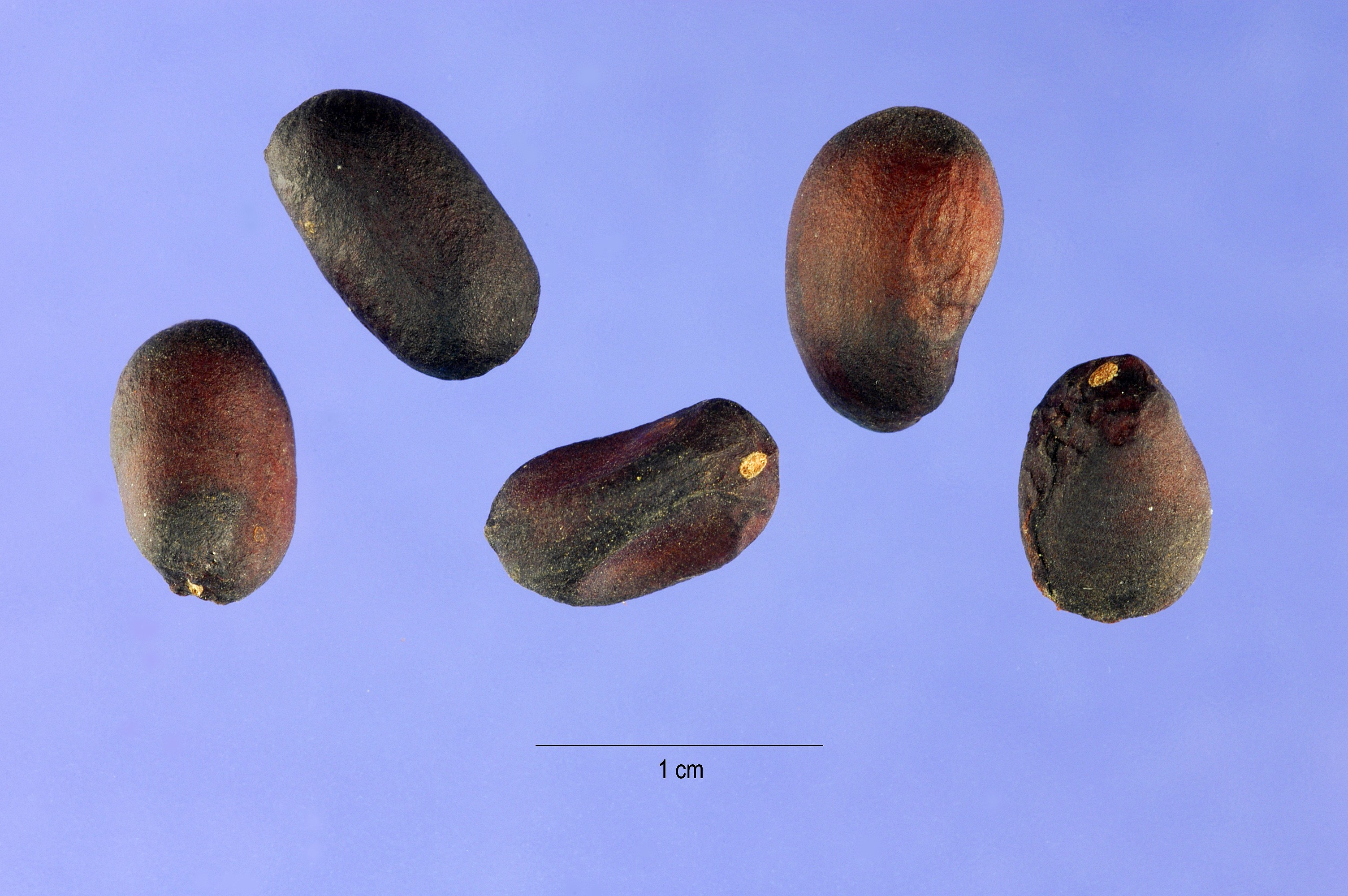
seeds

In the Blue Mountains at about 1,050 m (3,440 ft) altitude, P. brownii grows in an upland prairie on basalt-substrate close to conifer stands. In addition to a variety of grasses, the surrounding vegetation includes western monkshood, Hooker's and arrowleaf balsamroot, redstem ceanothus, pinkfairies, hairy clematis, dwarf larkspur, parsnipflower buckwheat, fernleaf and nineleaf biscuitroot, sulphur lupine, beardtongues species, virgate scorpion-weed, sticky and slender cinquefoil, sagebrush buttercup, dwarf and Nootka rose, common snowberry, American vetch and northern mule's ears. Brown's peony avoids drought by dying down completely in early summer, after flowering and surviving underground with stores of nutrients and energy in its thick rootstock. When parts of the plant are broken, bruised or damaged by predation it produces a pronounced bitter and unpleasant scent. Plants are rarely eaten, but caterpillars of the species Euxoa ustula, dark grey fishia and small heliothodes moth have been found to eat 1–2 mm holes in the flowers, although these species are better known from other host plants. Flowers give off the same smell more weakly and the lobes of the disc secrete a sweet nectar with a bitter aftertaste over the entire time the stigmas and anthers are fertile.

=== Pollination ===
According to one source, wasps, such as the common aerial yellowjacket and Polistes aurifer, and sweat bees, in particular, Lasioglossum species, make up the majority of pollinators, in addition to hoverflies such as Criorhina caudata. Bernhardt et al., after studying an endemic population in Oregon's Blue Mountains, stated:

The most common pollen vectors were wasp queens in the family Vespidae, the large flower fly Criorhina caudata (Syrphidae), and females of various Lasioglossum species (Halictidae), all of which foraged exclusively for nectar.

Although this plant produces a significant amount of pollen, the insects that pollinated it sought it for nectar. The study's authors argued that it is unlikely that the vespid wasps co-evolved with the plant, although they do benefit it by preying on moth larvae which consume it. The plant is a hexose-type nectar producer, with glucose being its primary sugar. The Lepidoptera typically seek sucrose-producing flowers. This plant also uses what the researchers described as an "unpleasant odor" to increase pollinator selectivity.

=== Seed dispersal ===
P. brownii seed is, in part, dispersed by rodents, which harvest seeds from the ripe, hanging fruit and store these in small caches up to 20 m (66 ft) away. In Washoe County, Nevada, the yellow-pine chipmunk, deer mouse, and the Great Basin pocket mouse have been observed to do this. The seeds, however, are not considered to be a choice food item, compared to pine kernels, which contain much more fat and protein. Abandoned seeds will germinate early in the next year, following the winter stratification, which breaks their dormancy.

== Cultivation ==
Brown's peony is rarely cultivated because it has limited ornamental value due to its few and small flowers and the difficulty to grow it. It is highly intolerant of water during its summer dormancy. It is advised to place this plant in an area of the garden with superb drainage and sheltered from summer rains. Paeonia brownii tolerates sand.

== Uses ==
Native Americans made the roots into a tea to treat lung illnesses.

The roots of P. brownii can be eaten for its nutrient content. Indigenous tribe members would also use them as a medicine to cure cough, kidney problems, sexually transmitted infections, pneumonia, nausea, indigestion and tuberculosis.
