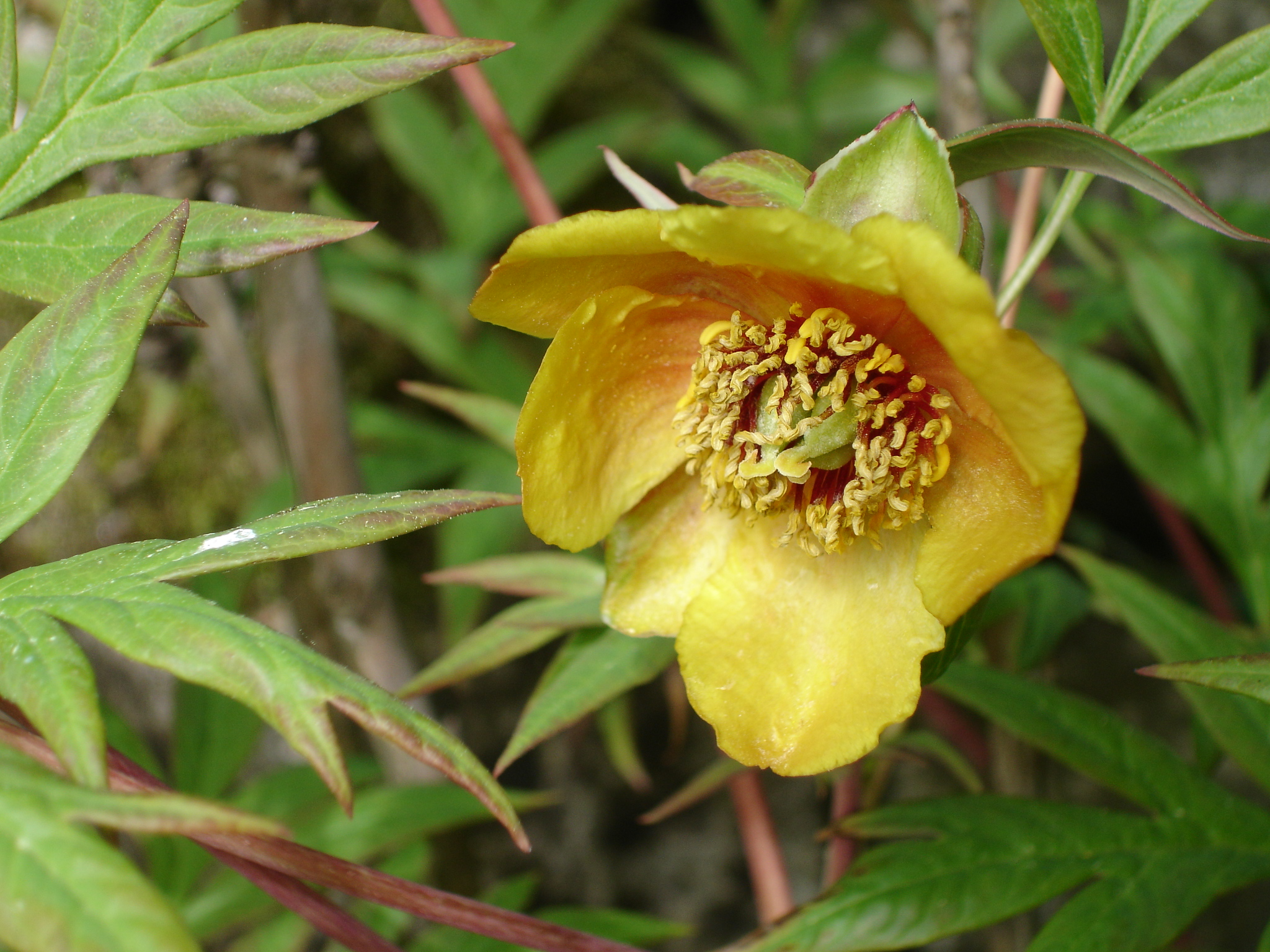

Scientific classification
- Kingdom: Plantae
- Clade: Embryophytes
- Clade: Tracheophytes
- Clade: Spermatophytes
- Clade: Angiosperms
- Clade: Eudicots
- Order: Saxifragales
- Family: Paeoniaceae
- Genus: Paeonia
- Species: P. delavayi

Binomial name
- Paeonia delavayi Franch.

Synonyms
- P. delavayi var. atropurpurea, var. angustiloba, var. alba, var. lutea forma superba; P. forrestii; P. franchettii; P. handel-maettii; P. lutea; P. potaninii, var. trollioides, forma alba

= Paeonia delavayi =

Species of shrub from southwest China

Paeonia delavayi is a low woody shrub belonging to the peony family, and is endemic to China. The vernacular name in China is 滇牡丹 (diān mǔdan). In English it is called Delavay's tree peony, Delavay peony, Dian peony, and dian mu dan. It mostly has reddish-brown to yellow, nodding flowers from mid May to mid June. The light green, delicate looking deciduous leaves consist of many segments, and are alternately arranged on new growth.

== Description ==
Paeonia delavayi is a deciduous hairless shrub measuring 0.25–1.75 m (9.8 in – 5 ft 8.9 in) high. Plants have creeping stolons and the roots are thick because they are fused together. It mainly reproduces by growing into large clones like this. Young twigs are light green, or tinged purple, rarely branching, erect, generally on top of perennial, stick-like, grayish to light brown stems. In lower plants, woody parts may not be present above ground. Like all diploid peonies, it has ten chromosomes (2n=10).

=== Leaves ===
The leaves are arranged alternately around the stem. In the lower leaves the leaf stalk is 10–15 cm (3.9–5.9 in) long and the leaf blade is oval in outline, 15–30 cm (5.9–11.8 in) long and 10–22 cm (3.9–8.7 in) wide, twice compounded or very deeply incised, first into three to eleven leaflets, themselves deeply divided or lobed into two to eleven secondary lobes (this is called biternate). These are linear to linear-lanceolate in shape and have an entire margin or incidentally may have a few teeth. Usually each lower leaf has between twenty five and one hundred segments (full range 17 to 312). The width of the leaf segments is 0.5–2.75 cm (0.20–1.08 in). Higher along the stem, leaves becoming smaller with fewer leaflets and segments.

=== Flowers ===
As usual in peonies, there is a gradation between leaves, bracts and sepals. One to five bracts defined as those immediately below the calyx, have various shapes, ranging from incised and leaf-like to entire and sepal-like. Sepals are rounded or triangular-rounded, mostly green, but sometimes with a pink inside, dark red or purple. They have a much broader base and a smaller, narrower, rounded or suddenly pointed (or mucronate) dark green tip. The number of bracts and sepals together varies up to 10 or 11, sometimes forming a less or more conspicuous involucre.

The nodding flowers open from mid May to mid June, are sometimes single but usually two or three together on a branch, one at the end and the others in the axils of the leaves. The color of the petals also varies between and within populations from red, dark red, or dark purple-red, mostly in the northeast of the range, and yellow either with or without a dark red spot at the base towards the South and West, and sometimes petals may be yellow with a red margin, orange, green-yellow, or white. The number of sepals ranges from four to thirteen. Flowers have between 25 and 160 stamens, with yellow, pale red, red, or dark red filaments topped by yellow, orange, red, or purple anthers. Although flowers with red-brown petals usually have red to purple filaments and anthers, both filaments and anthers can also be yellow in such flowers. The fleshy disk at the base of the carpels is short, ring-shaped or forming a short cylinder 1–3 mm high, with teeth, green, yellowish, yellow, red, or dark red in color. The disk may secrete nectar, which gives off a scent. There are typically two to four, and, rarely, up to eight carpels. The ovary is mostly green, but sometimes purple, is topped by a yellow-green, yellow, red, or purple-red stigma, and contains seven to seventeen ovules in each carpel. These develop into fruits (so-called follicles) which are long ovoid in shape, 2-3.5 × 1-1.5 cm, which are brown when ripe in August, and contain between one and six brown-black seeds each.

=== Variability ===
Putative taxa have been recognized that have been said to differ by the presence of an involucre (P. delavayi), maroon-red petals in P. delavayi and P. potaninii, yellow in P. lutea and P. potaninii var. trollioides, white in P. potaninii forma alba, and narrower leaf segments in P. potaninii.

=== Comparison with related species ===
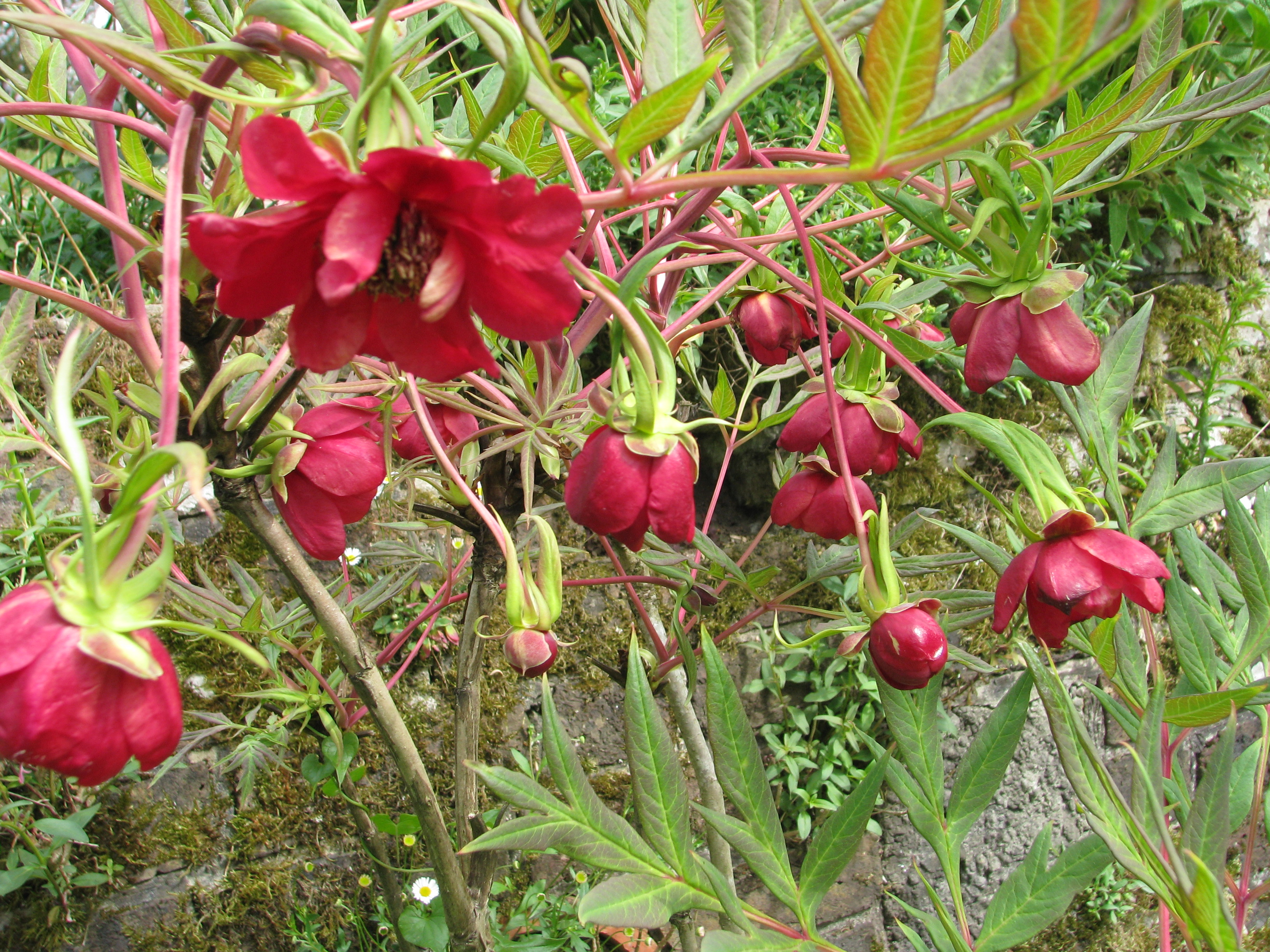
Habit of a maroon-colored specimen

Paeonia delavayi is closely related to P. ludlowii. It can be distinguished easily because it reproduces mainly by stolons, has fused roots, stems emerge from the ground individually, is only up to 1.75 m high, has segmented leaves with narrow and acute segments, variously colored petals, stamens, disk, and stigmas, has two to eight carpels, which develop in small follicles (2-3.5 × 1-1.5 cm) and rarely produce seeds. P. ludlowii on the other hand can only reproduce by seed and lacks creeping underground stems, has slender, regular roots, while the stems form a clump, grows to 2-3.5 m high, has leaves with short and suddenly pointed lobes, petals, stamens, disk and stigmas are always yellow, only one or very rarely two carpels develop but this grows into a much larger follicle (4.75-7 × 2-3.3 cm) which always develops seeds.

== Taxonomy ==
Paeonia delavayi is problematic because taxonomists differ on the number and status of taxa that should be distinguished in this group.

=== Taxonomic history ===
Paeonia delavayi with maroon-red and P. lutea with yellow flowers, both from Northwest Yunnan were described respectively by Adrien René Franchet and Delavay, on the same page of the same scientific article in 1886. In 1904, Finet and Gagnepain thought these should both be regarded varieties of P. delavayi. Komarov described P. potaninii from West Sichuan in 1921, with smaller, deep maroon-red flowers and narrower leaf segments. In 1931 Stern adds P. trollioides from Northwest Yunnan with yellow flowers shaped like those of Trollius, growing more erect and having larger fruits, which he reduces to P. potaninii var. trollioides in 1946, in addition to recognizing P. potaninii, P. delavayi and P. lutea. In 1953 Stern in cooperation with George Taylor described one more taxon, P. lutea var. ludlowii, discovered in southeastern Tibet. Fang in 1958 agreed with Stern but ignored P. lutea var. ludlowii. Wu renamed P. potaninii to P. delavayi var. angustiloba and distinguished P. lutea from P. delavayi in 1984. In 1990 Gong recognized P. delavayi, P. lutea, P. potaninii, P. potaninii var. trollioides, and added P. potaninii forma alba with white petals. Pan (1979, 1993) on the other hand only recognized P. delavayi including var. lutea and var. angustiloba, but did not mention P. lutea var. ludlowii.

=== Modern classification ===
Paeonia delavayi is variable in the number and shape of the leaflets and in the number, size, and color of all parts of the flower both within and between populations. Character states occur in all combinations. Nowadays, only one species, P. delavayi, is acknowledged, without infraspecific taxa. Paeonia lutea, P. potaninii, and P. trollioides are all regarded as synonyms of P. delavayi. P. lutea var. ludlowii was shown to differ in a number of characters and is now named Paeonia ludlowii.

=== Phylogeny ===
Paeonia is the only genus recognized in the family Paeoniaceae. Three sections are distinguished: an early branching Onaepia that consists of both native North-American species P. brownii and P. californica, section Paeonia, which comprises all Eurasian herbaceous species, and the section Moutan, which includes all woody species from China, including Tibet. These relations are represented by the following tree.

- genus Paeonia
  - section Paeoniae
    all Eurasian herbaceous peonies
  - section Moutan
    - - subsection Vaginatae
        all other tree peonies
      - subsection Delavayanae
        - P. ludlowii
        - P. delavayi
  - - section Onaepia
      - P. brownii
      - P. californica

=== Etymology ===
Paeonia delavayi is named after Father Jean Marie Delavay, a French Catholic missionary in China, who collected plants.

== Distribution ==
Paeonia delavayi is endemic to southwestern China, where it is limited to Sichuan, Yunnan and the extreme South-East of Tibet.

== Ecology ==
Paeonia delavayi almost exclusively reproduces through stolons, and seedlings are rare to find. This allows for rapid colonization after a seed has arrived at a new location, such as on newly stabilized debris. In combination with its thick roots, this makes this species well adapted to colonize open habitat, that may be prone to drying out quickly. Local populations may consist of only one clone. It grows in light shade such as moist Picea likiangensis forest or dry and open Pinus densata–Quercus gilliana forest, and sometimes on grassy slopes or in glades. It grows at 2,000–3,600 m (6,600–11,800 ft) altitude. Insects feed on the fruits and limit seed development.

== Conservation ==
Paeonia delavayi has been listed as endangered by the China Plant Red Data Book, and may be under threat if digging out roots for medicine on a large scale is not adequately controlled. However, because it easily reproduces vegetatively and is relatively widely distributed, it may not go extinct shortly if overexploitation of the root for medicine will be adequately controlled.

== Cultivation ==
Paeonia delavayi is cultivated as an ornamental in gardens. In China, it is cultivated to produce a traditional medicine. It is said to be grown with ease, preferring a neutral or limy, deep rich soil in sun or partial shade. It is however sensitive to stagnant water at the roots and does best in soils with good drainage, such as in raised beds. Planting tree peonies in a sheltered position may help to prevent strong winds from breaking branches, particularly during flowering. Tree peonies in general can suffer from peony wilt (Botrytis paeoniae, a grey mould blight) and verticillium wilt, which may cause wilting and dieback of young shoots. In infected soils, honey fungus can cause instant death.

=== Culture varieties ===
Crossbreeding of yellow-flowered P. delavayi with double-flowered P. suffruticosa by Émile Lemoine has led to the introduction of the color yellow into the cultivated double-flowered tree-peonies. These hybrids are known as the P. ×lemoinii-group, and include double-flowered "Chromatella" (1928), "Alice Harding" (1935) and semidouble-flowered "Sang Lorraine" (1939). In 1948 horticultulturist Toichi Itoh from Tokyo used pollen from "Alice Harding" to fertilize the herbaceous P. lactiflora "Katoden", which resulted in a new category of peonies, the Itoh or intersectional cultivars. These are herbaceous, have leaves like tree peonies, with many large flowers from late spring to early autumn, and good peony wilt resistance. Some of the early Itoh cultivars are "Yellow Crown", "Yellow Dream", "Yellow Emperor" and "Yellow Heaven".
