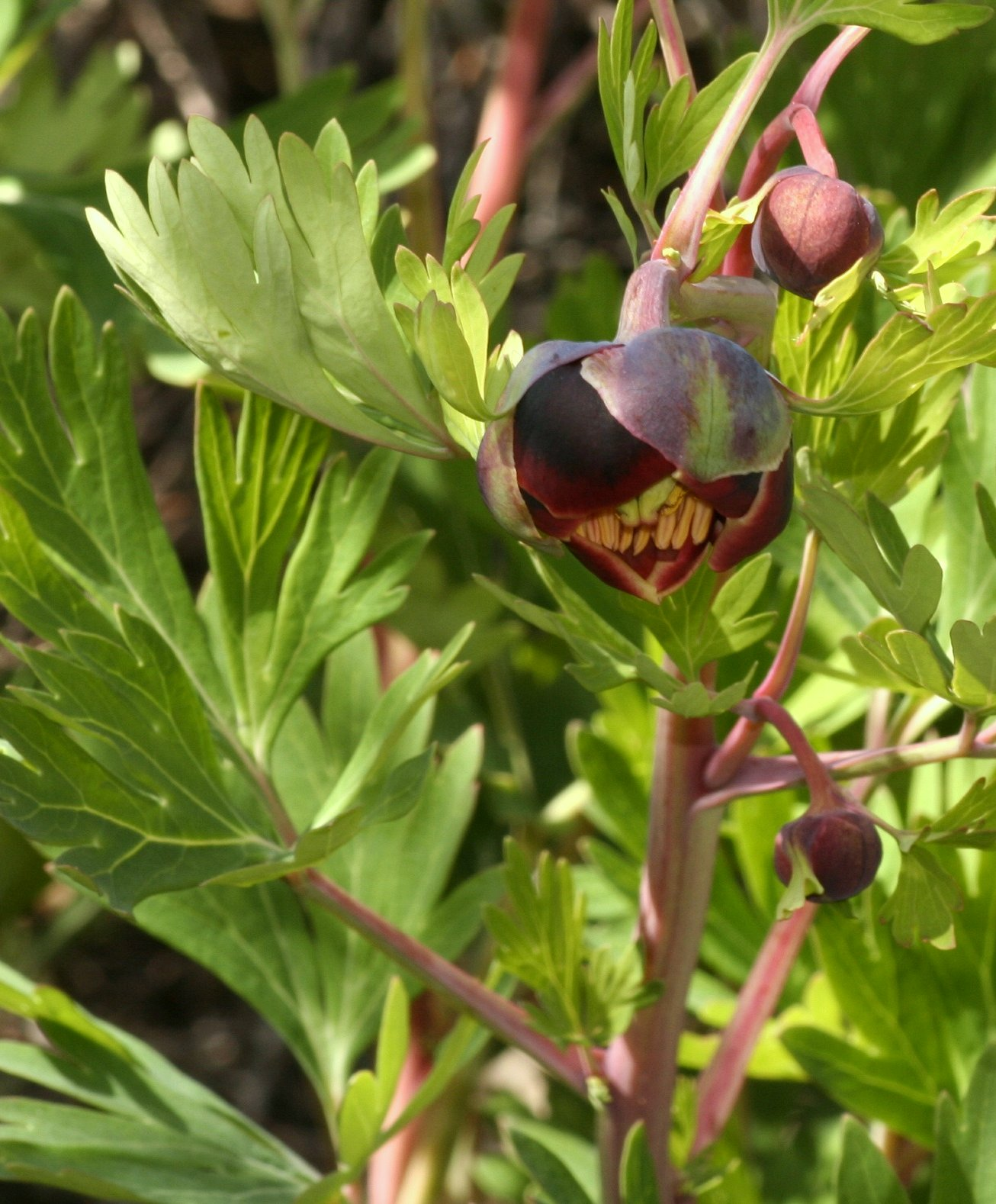

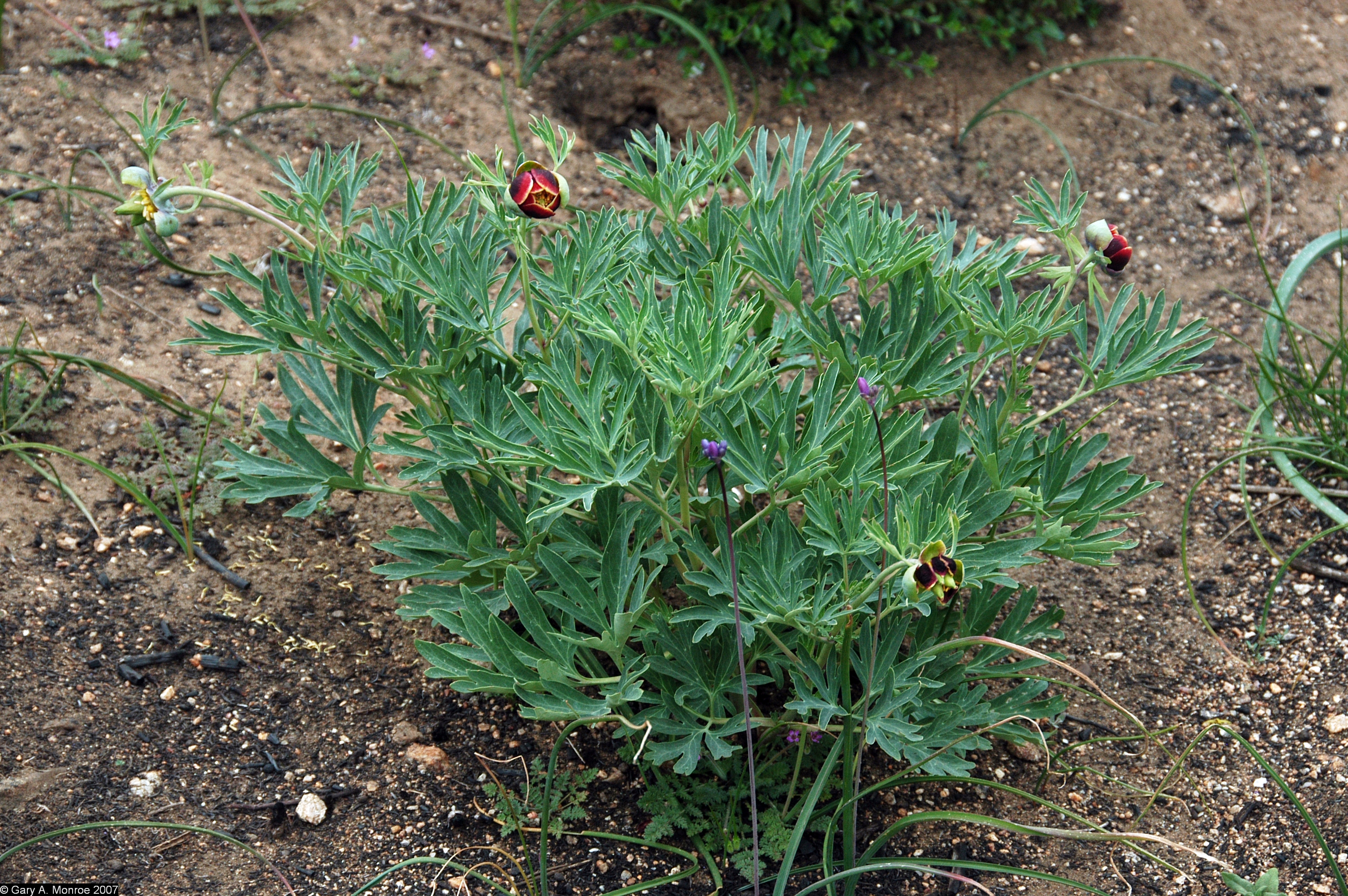

Scientific classification
- Kingdom: Plantae
- Clade: Tracheophytes
- Clade: Angiosperms
- Clade: Eudicots
- Order: Saxifragales
- Family: Paeoniaceae
- Genus: Paeonia
- Species: P. californica

Binomial name
- Paeonia californica Torrey & A.Gray

Synonyms
- P. brownii ssp. californica

= Paeonia californica =

Species of tree

Paeonia californica is a perennial herbaceous plant of 35–70 cm (14–28 in) high, that retreats underground in summer, and reoccurs with the arrival of the winter rains. It has lobed leaves, elliptic (cup-shaped) drooping flowers with dark maroon-colored petals, and many yellow anthers. It flowers mostly from January to March (or sometimes as early as December or as late as May), and later develops two to five fruits per flower. Its common name is California peony and it is sometimes also referred to as wild peony. This peony is an endemic of southwestern California (USA), where it is not rare, and northernmost Baja California (Mexico). It grows on dry hillsides in the coastal sage scrub and chaparral communities of the coastal mountains of Southern and Central California, often as an understory plant.

It is sometimes considered a subspecies of the other Paeonia species native to North America, Paeonia brownii.

== Description ==
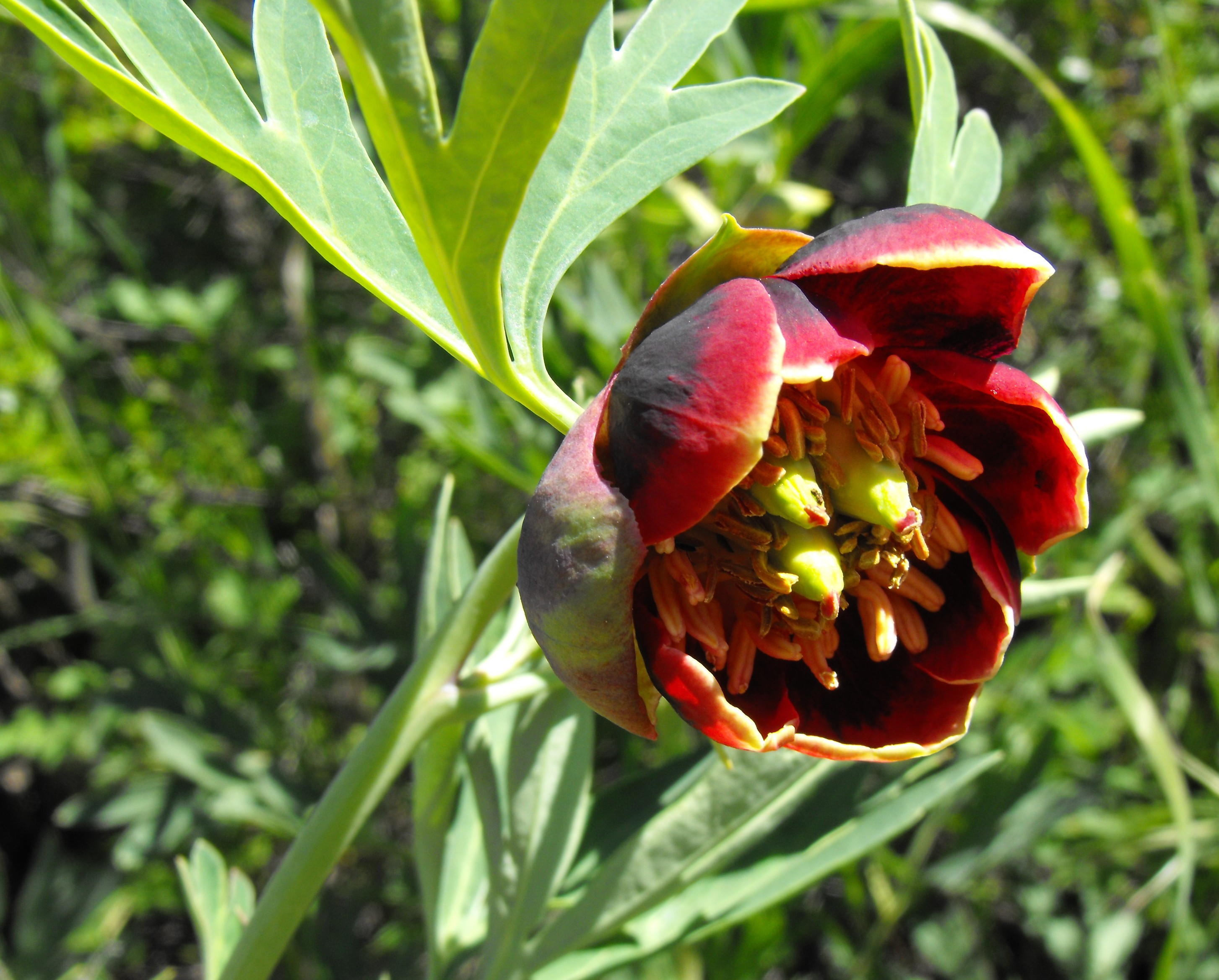

The California peony is a summer-deciduous perennial herbaceous plant of 35–75 cm (14–30 in) high. Each shoot usually carries seven to twelve compound leaves, each primary segment is 3–9 cm (1.2–3.5 in) long and 1–6 cm (0.39–2.36 in) wide, and the finest divisions are linear to spade-shaped. The base of the leaflet blade narrows gradually into the leaflet stalk, which is short or may be absent. The tips of the leaflets are usually pointy, and the surface of the leaf is green and not particularly glaucous. The bisexual flowers occur at the tip of the stem and are nodding. The petals are dark red or purplish, sometimes almost black, while the margins are lighter, elliptic in shape and 1.5–2.5 cm (0.59–0.98 in) long, usually longer than the sepals. The numerous stamens consist of filaments of 0.5–0.8 cm (0.20–0.31 in) topped by anthers of 0.3–0.7 cm (0.12–0.28 in) long, containing yellow pollen. Two to five carpels eventually develop into follicles of 3–4 cm (1.2–1.6 in) long. The seeds are about 1.5 cm (0.59 in) long, slightly curved, and have a dull, coarsely wrinkled surface. P. californica has ten chromosomes (2n=10), as all other diploid peonies.

=== Differences from related species ===
The California peony is most related to, and close in appearance to Brown's peony, with which it constitutes the section Onaepia. Common characters include having rather small drooping flowers, with small petals and a very prominent disk which usually consists of separate segments, while the seeds are cylindrical rather than ovoid. It can still be easily distinguished from P. browniii however by 35–75 cm (14–30 in) high stems bearing seven to twelve leaves which are green, while the leaflet blade gradually eases into the leaflet stalk or lacks such a stalk all together, and the finest lobes are lanceolate or narrowly elliptic. P. brownii is only 20–40 cm (7.9–15.7 in) high, has six to eight glaucous leaves per stem that suddenly narrow at their base and the finest segments are egg-shaped. In P. californica the petals are egg-shaped, and about 1.5–2.5 cm (0.59–0.98 in) long, reaching beyond the sepals, while in P. brownii the petals are circular or wider than long, and about 0.8–1.5 cm (0.31–0.59 in) long, definitely shorter than the sepals.

== Taxonomy ==
Paeonia californica was first described in 1838 by Thomas Nuttall in the Flora of North America which was edited by John Torrey and Asa Gray. Several later authors considered it a subtaxon of P. brownii: a subspecies (Abrams in 1944, and Halda in 1997) or a variety (Lynch, 1890). There are however several morphological differences, the environmental circumstances in which each grows are different and the distributions of both species do not overlap, so currently there seems to be consensus that both need to be regarded as separate species.

P. brownii and P. californica together make up the section Onaepia of the genus Paeonia. Precise relationships between the three sections remain ambiguous, and can be represented by the following phylogenetic tree.

- genus Paeonia
  - section Paeoniae
    all Eurasian herbaceous peonies
  - section Moutan
    - - subsection Vaginatae
        all other tree peonies
      - subsection Delavayanae
        - P. ludlowii
        - P. delavayi
  - - section Onaepia
      - P. brownii
      - P. californica

== Distribution ==
California peonies have a native distribution in southwestern California (Los Angeles, Monterey, Orange, Riverside, Santa Barbara, San Bernardino, San Diego, San Luis Obispo and Ventura Counties) and in neighboring Mexico (northern Baja California), although distribution in Mexico is poorly known. It grows on dry hillsides in the coastal sage scrub and chaparral communities of the coastal mountains of Southern and Central California, often as an understory plant between sea level and 1,500 m (4,900 ft) elevation.

== Cultivation ==
The California peony has entered limited cultivation in native plant landscaping and xeriscaping. It is drought-tolerant and is moisture sensitive in the summer, when its swollen root will rot if watered. It prefers partial sun and tolerates a variety of soil types. Deer seem to avoid eating this plant.
