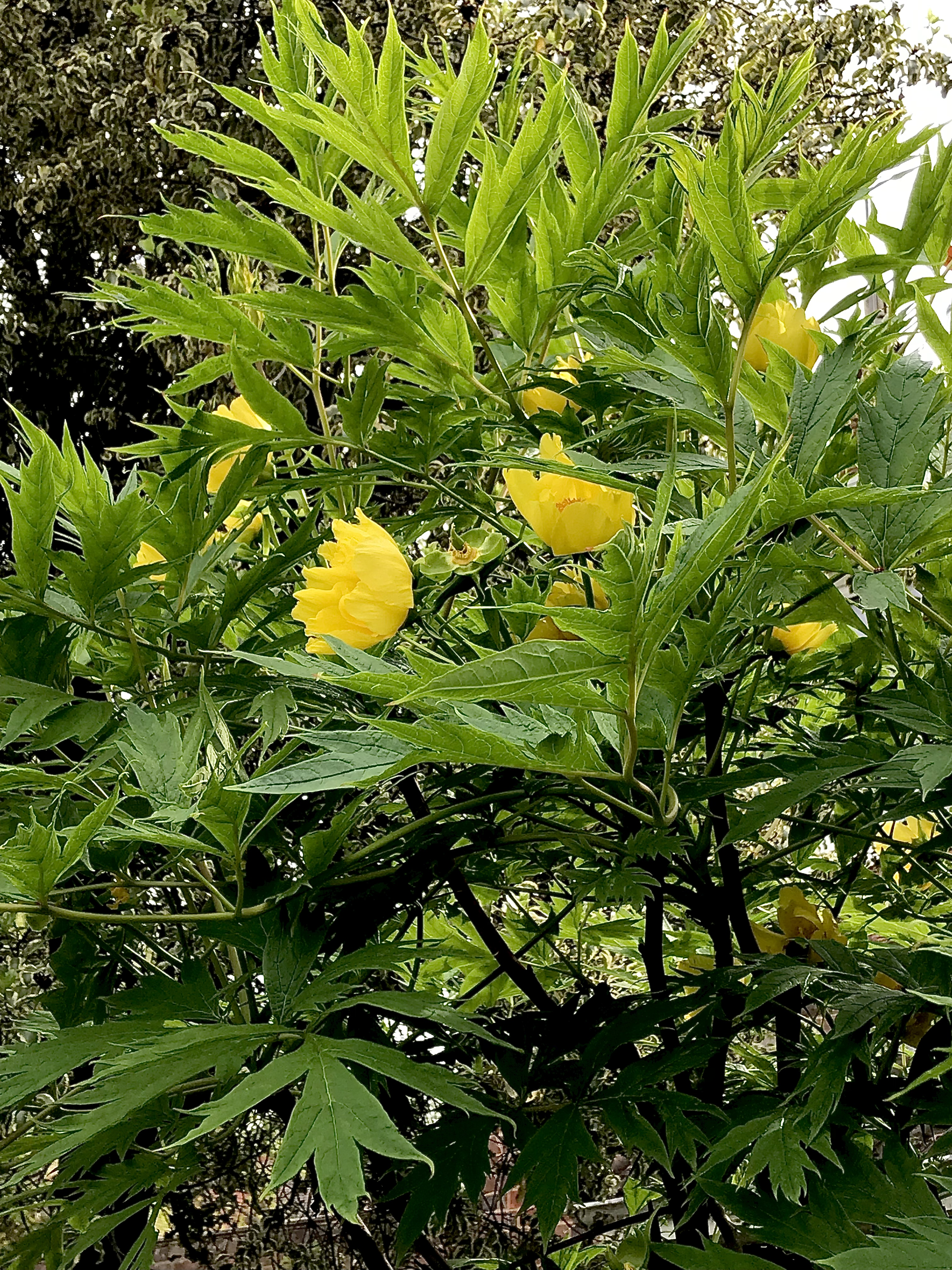

Scientific classification
- Kingdom: Plantae
- Clade: Embryophytes
- Clade: Tracheophytes
- Clade: Spermatophytes
- Clade: Angiosperms
- Clade: Eudicots
- Order: Saxifragales
- Family: Paeoniaceae
- Genus: Paeonia
- Species: P. ludlowii

Binomial name
- Paeonia ludlowii (Stern & G.Taylor) D.Y.Hong

Synonyms
- P. lutea var. ludlowii; P. delavayi ssp. ludlowii

= Paeonia ludlowii =

Species of shrub from southeast Tibet

Paeonia ludlowii is a deciduous shrub of medium height, belonging to the tree peony section Moutan of the genus Paeonia, and endemic to southeast Tibet. In Tibet it is known as ≠'lumaidao' meaning "God's flower". The vernacular name in Chinese is 大花黄牡丹 (da hua huang mu dan) meaning "big yellow-flowered peony". In English it is sometimes called Tibetan tree peony or Ludlow's tree peony. It has pure yellow, slightly nodding, bowl-shaped flowers, and large, twice compounded, light green leaves.

== Description ==
P. ludlowii is a hairless, deciduous shrub of 2–3.5 m (6.6–11.5 ft) high. It has ten chromosomes (2n=10).

=== Stems and leaves ===
The roots become narrower further down and are not fused together. There are no creeping stems (or stolons). The grey to light brown stems grow in clumps from a gnarled root crown, seldom branch, remain approximately the same width during the growing season, and after some years may reach 4 cm (1.6 in) in diameter. Young stems are light green, with at their base eight to twelve scales. Leaves are light green above and glaucous pale green below. In the lowest leaves, the leaf stalk is 9–15 cm (3.5–5.9 in) long, while the leaf blade is twice compounded or deeply divided (or biternate), with the primary leaflets on a short stem of 2–3 cm, the leaflet blades 6-12 × 5–13 cm, those usually incised almost to the base, having three segments, at base extending along the stalk until disappearing (or decurrent). Each of the segments 4-9 × 1.5-4 cm, mostly incised to midlength into three lobes of 2-5 × 0.5-1.5 cm, with an entire margin or one or two teeth, pointy at their tips.

=== Inflorescence ===
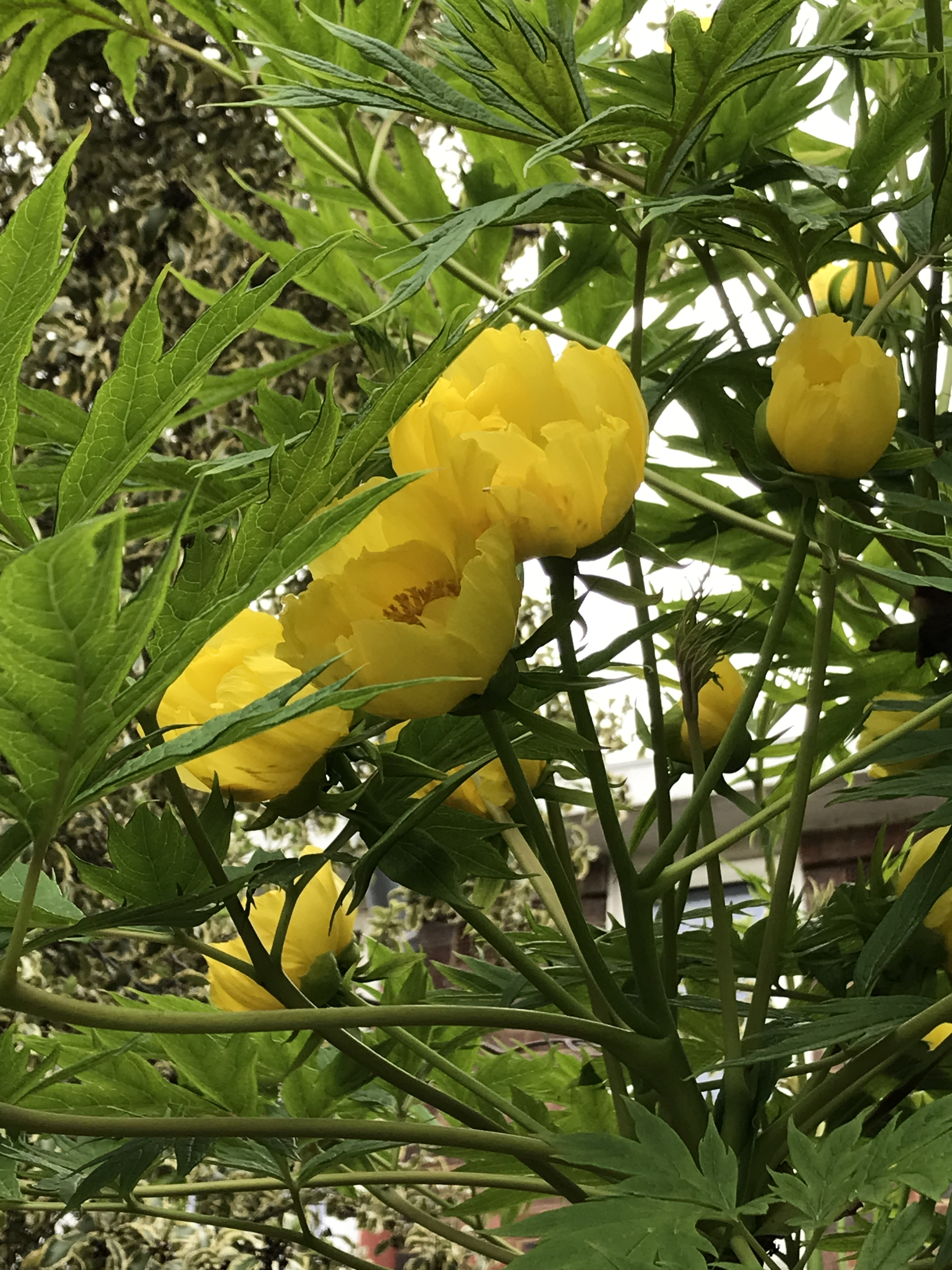
Lateral view of inflorescence (cultivated plant)

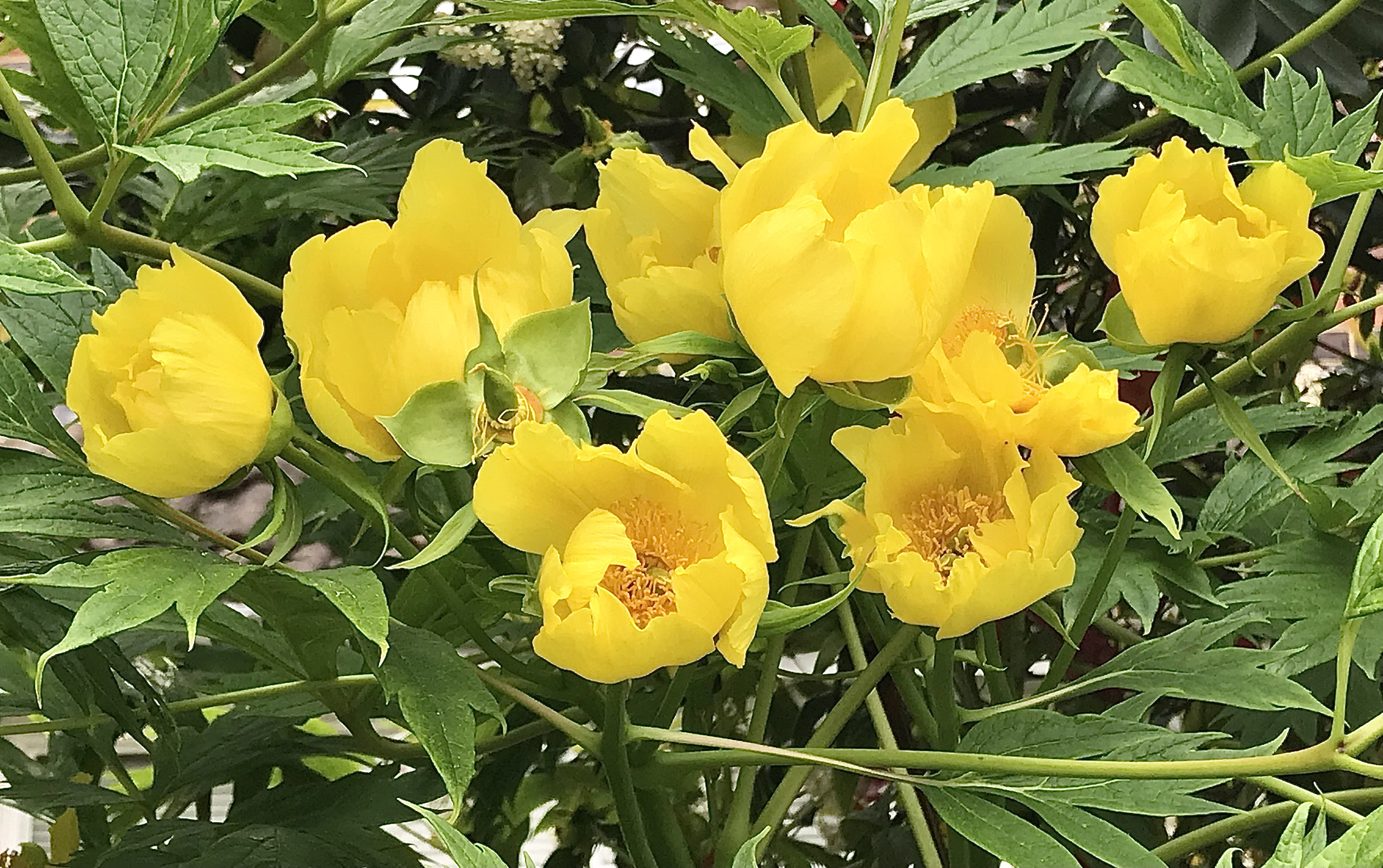
Inflorescence viewed semi-laterally to show both interiors and exteriors of flowers

The slightly nodding bisexual flowers grow three or four to a shoot, the shoots springing from the leaf axils. The flowers are 10–12 cm (3.9–4.7 in) wide, are borne on a pedicels 5–9 cm (2.0–3.5 in) in length, and open in late May and early June. Each flower is subtended by four or five lance-shaped bracts. There are three to five green sepals with a rounded outline of 1.5-2.5 cm, which have a rounded tip narrowing abruptly to a point. The pure yellow, inverted egg-shaped petals are spreading but slightly curved inwards, 5-5.5 × 2.5-3.5 cm and have a rounded tip. The numerous filaments are yellow, 1-1.5 cm long, topped by yellow anthers about 4 mm in length . The yellow disk at the base of the carpels is ring-shaped, bears teeth, and stands about 1 mm in height. At the centre of each flower are one or two carpels that are topped by yellow stigmas.

=== Fruit and seed ===
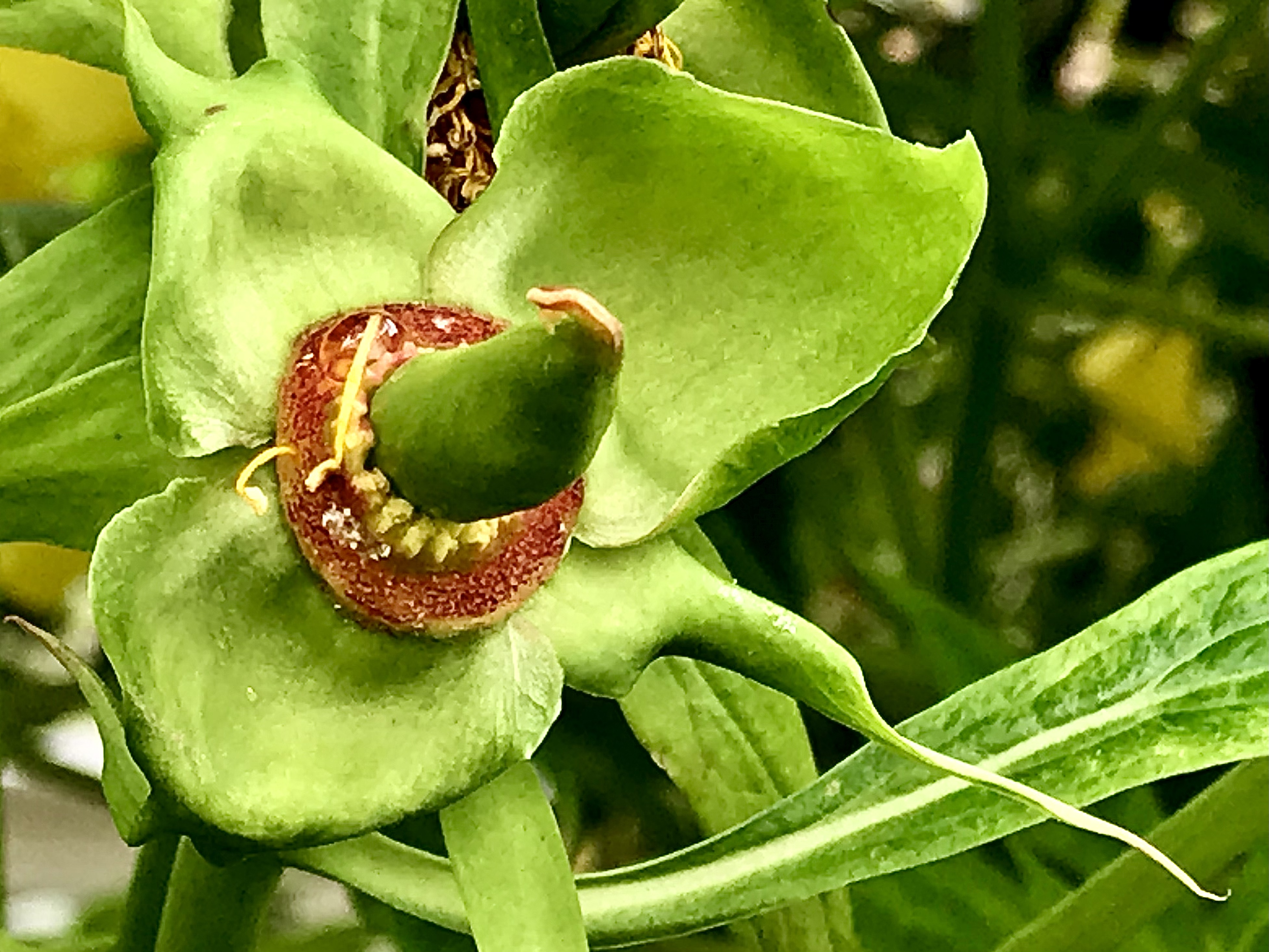
Young follicle, shortly after fall of petals and stamens

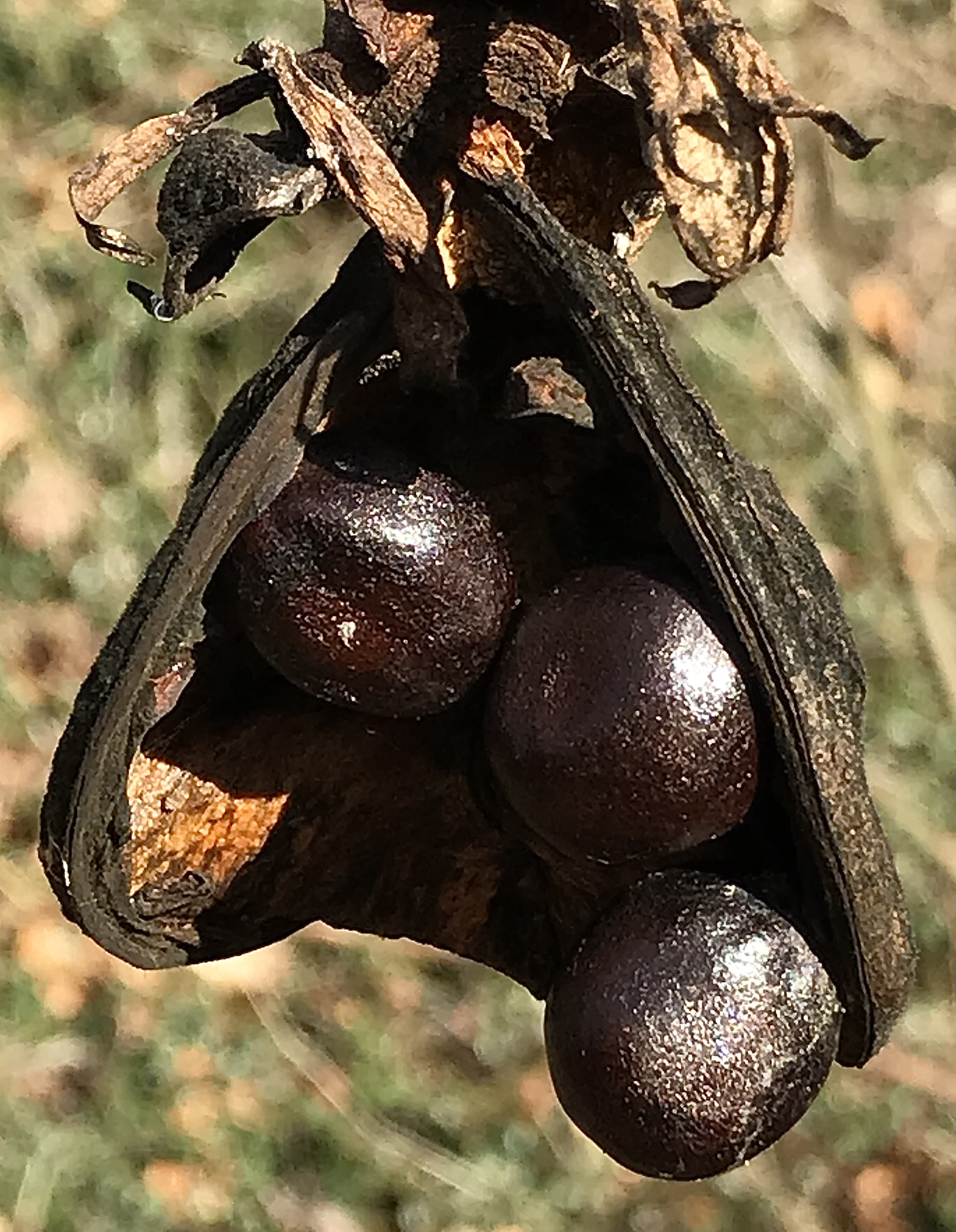
Ripe follicle, showing large, round, dark brown seeds

The carpels develop into cylindrical fruits (or follicles) of 4.7-7 × 2-3.3 cm. These dehisce in August to reveal large, dark brown, globose seeds measuring 1.3 cm in diameter.

=== Differences from related species ===
Paeonia delavayi is closely related to P. ludlowii, but can easily be distinguished because it reproduces mainly by stolons, has fused roots, stems emerge from the ground individually, is only up to 1.75 m (5.7 ft) high, has segmented leaves with narrow and acute segments. Petals, stamens, disk, and stigmas may be yellow, maroon, orange or white. It has two to eight carpels, which develop in small follicles (2-3.5 × 1-1.5 cm) and rarely produce seeds. P. ludlowii on the other hand can only reproduce by seed and lacks creeping underground stems, has slender, regular roots, while the stems form a clump, grows to 2-3.5 m high, has leaves with short and abruptly pointed lobes, petals, stamens, disk and stigmas are always yellow, only one or very rarely two carpels develop but this grows into a much larger follicle (4.7-7 × 2-3.3 cm) which always develops seeds.

Other species of tree peony do not have yellow flowers, do not grow as large and generally have darker green foliage and darker brown bark. Some of the many cultivated cross-breeds of tree peonies may have yellow flowers, but these are not nodding, generally much larger, mostly double flowered, with darker green leaves and much lower.

== Taxonomy ==
In 1886 P. delavayi with maroon-red and P. lutea with yellow flowers, both from Northwest Yunnan, were described respectively by Franchet and Delavay, on the same page of the same scientific article. In 1904 Finet and Gagnepain thought these should both be regarded varieties of P. delavayi. In 1953 F.C. Stern and George Taylor described one more taxon, P. lutea var. ludlowii, discovered in southeastern Tibet. In their description of Paeonia lutea var. ludlowii, these authors indicate that it is distinctly different from variety lutea. Recent analysis shows that these differences between ludlowii and the other described taxa in the P. delavayi-group are consistent whilst the character states within the other taxa occur in any combination. Therefore, Hong concludes that ludlowii should be acknowledged as a distinct species, while the other taxa cannot be upheld and should be synonymized with P. delavayi.

=== Phylogeny ===
Paeonia is the only genus recognized in the family Paeoniaceae. Three sections are distinguished: an early branching Onaepia that consists of both native North American species P. brownii and P. californica, section Paeonia, which comprises all Eurasian herbaceous species, and the section Moutan, which includes all woody species from China, including Tibet. These relations are represented by the following tree.

- genus Paeonia
  - - section Paeonia
      all Eurasian herbaceous peonies
    - section Moutan
      - - subsection Vaginatae
          all other tree peonies
        - subsection Delavayanae
          - P. ludlowii
          - P. delavayi
  - - section Onaepia
      - P. brownii
      - P. californica

=== Etymology ===
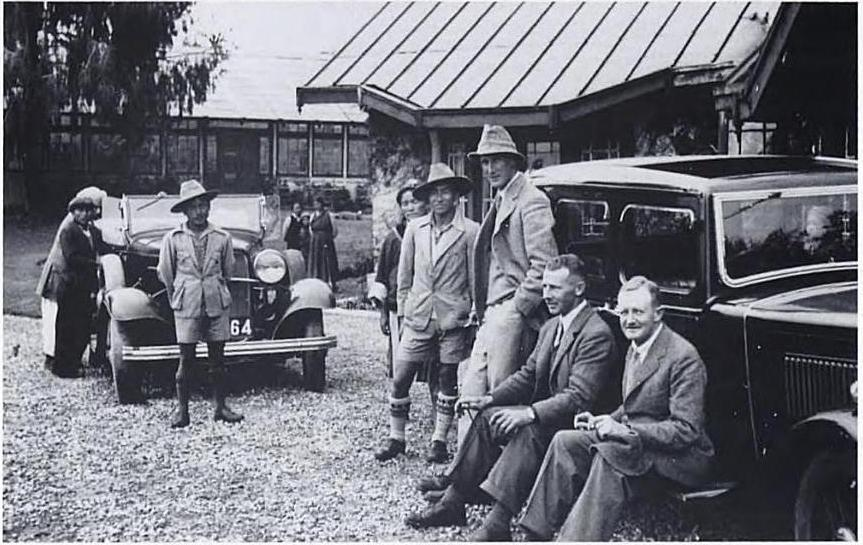
Frank Ludlow (tall figure leaning against car) and friends in Sikkim

The species was named in his honor Frank Ludlow who collected seed of Paeonia ludlowii in the Tsangpo Valley (upper Brahmaputra River) in 1936, after which it became for the first time known to western science, on his expedition with Major George Sherriff in South-East Tibet.

== Distribution and ecology ==
Paeonia ludlowii is an endemic that is restricted to the Nyingchi, Mainling and Lhünzê counties of South-East Tibet. It grows in open forests, and thickets on dry rocky slopes at elevations of 3,000–3,500 m (9,800–11,500 ft). Individual populations are small in area but have a large number of individuals. Because the seeds are quite large, almost all seeds germinate close to the parent, and are often found in a large density. Perhaps rats are the most effective mains of seed dispersal to somewhat distanced new locations.

== Cultivation ==
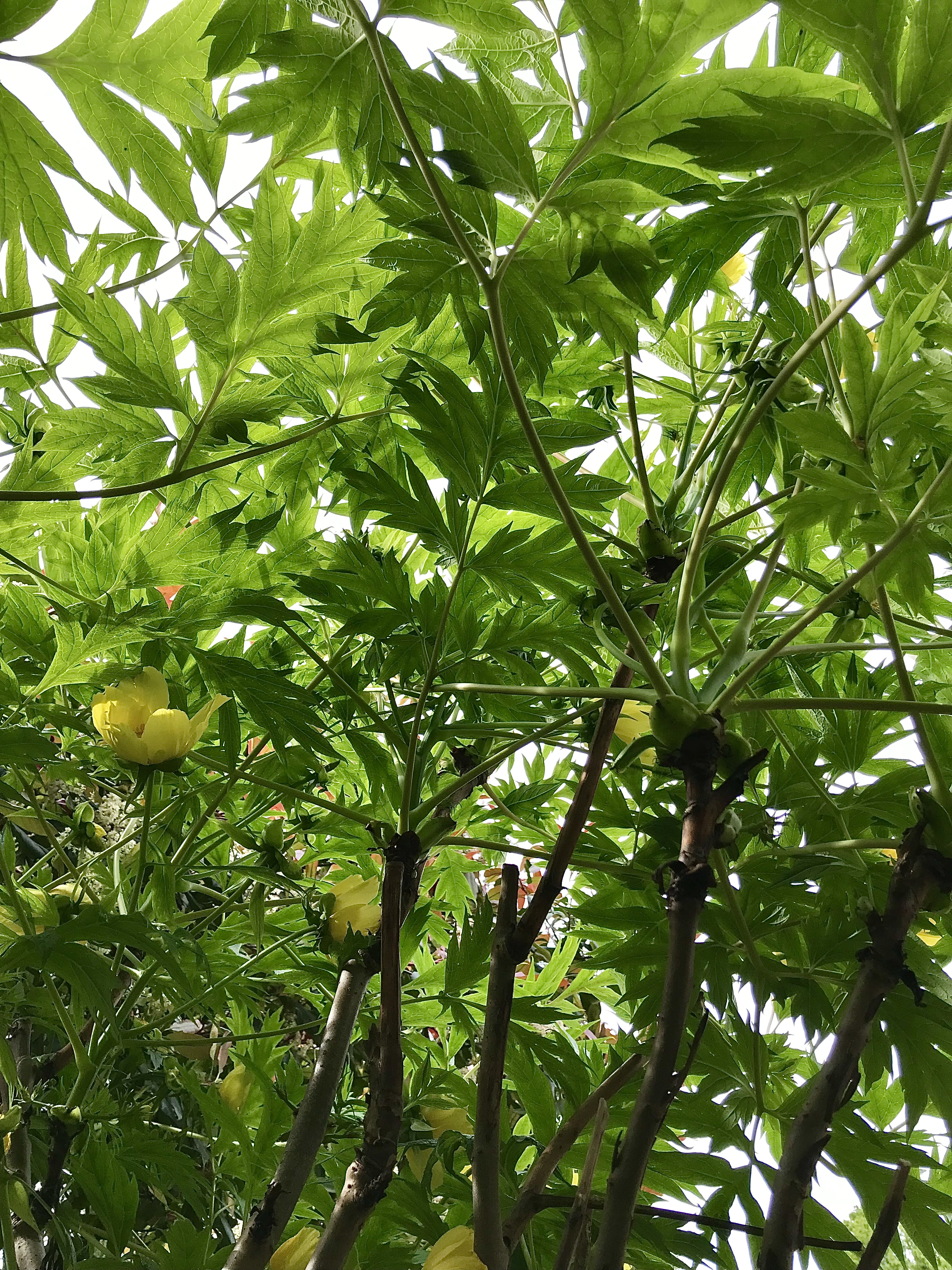
Foliage canopy viewed from beneath during flowering period

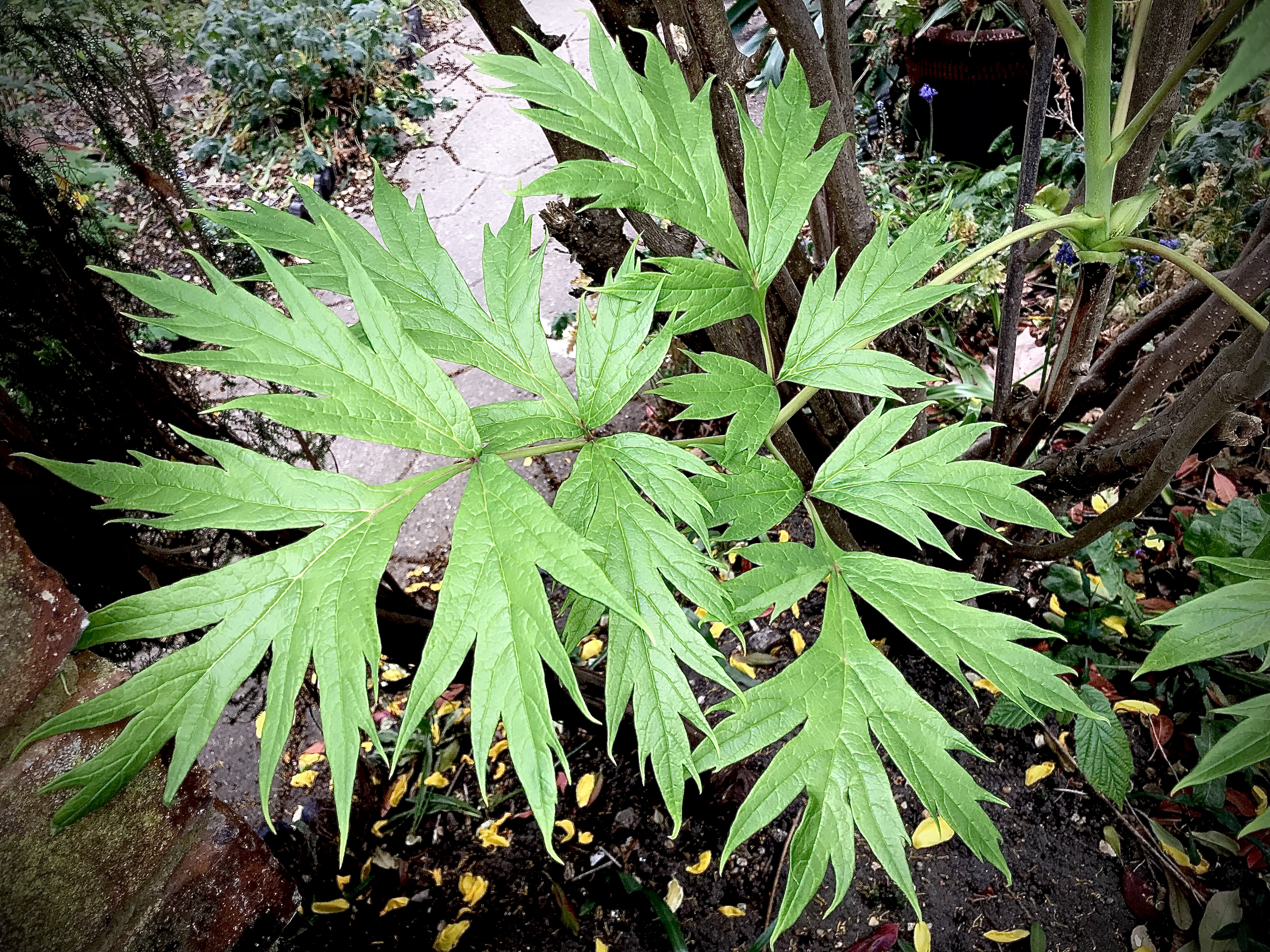
Single leaf (upper side), showing elegantly-shaped lamina and long petiole

Paeonia ludlowii is sometimes grown as an ornamental for its delicate foliage and beautiful (although short-lived) flowers. In cultivation, it does best in fertile, neutral to slightly alkaline, well-drained soil. Specimens prefer to be planted deep and dislike too much water. In early spring and during summer high-potash liquid feed stimulates richer flowering. When growing the species from seed, these can best first be soaked, mixed with damp vermiculite, and kept at room temperature until root emerges after one to three months. If kept cool afterwards, the shoot appears after a further two to three months. When these are planted into separate pots immediately and grown in daylight results are generally good.

The shoot only appears when a root length of at least 6 cm (2.4 in) has developed. The epicotyl remains dormant until the GA3/ABA ratio is sufficiently different.

Tree peonies in general can suffer from peony wilt (Botrytis paeoniae, a grey mould blight) and verticillium wilt, which may cause wilting and dieback of young shoots. In infected soils, honey fungus can cause instant death.

== Uses ==
The species is used as a traditional medicine, and local people dig it up for its root bark. Exploitation by people from other parts of China is a serious threat to the survival of this species. The large seeds are ground into a flour used to prepare a type of tsampa and also to prepare seed oils and hair dye by the Lhoba people. The shrub is sometimes cultivated as an ornamental for the sake of its handsome, yellow flowers and ferny foliage in botanical gardens and by plant collectors.

== Gallery ==
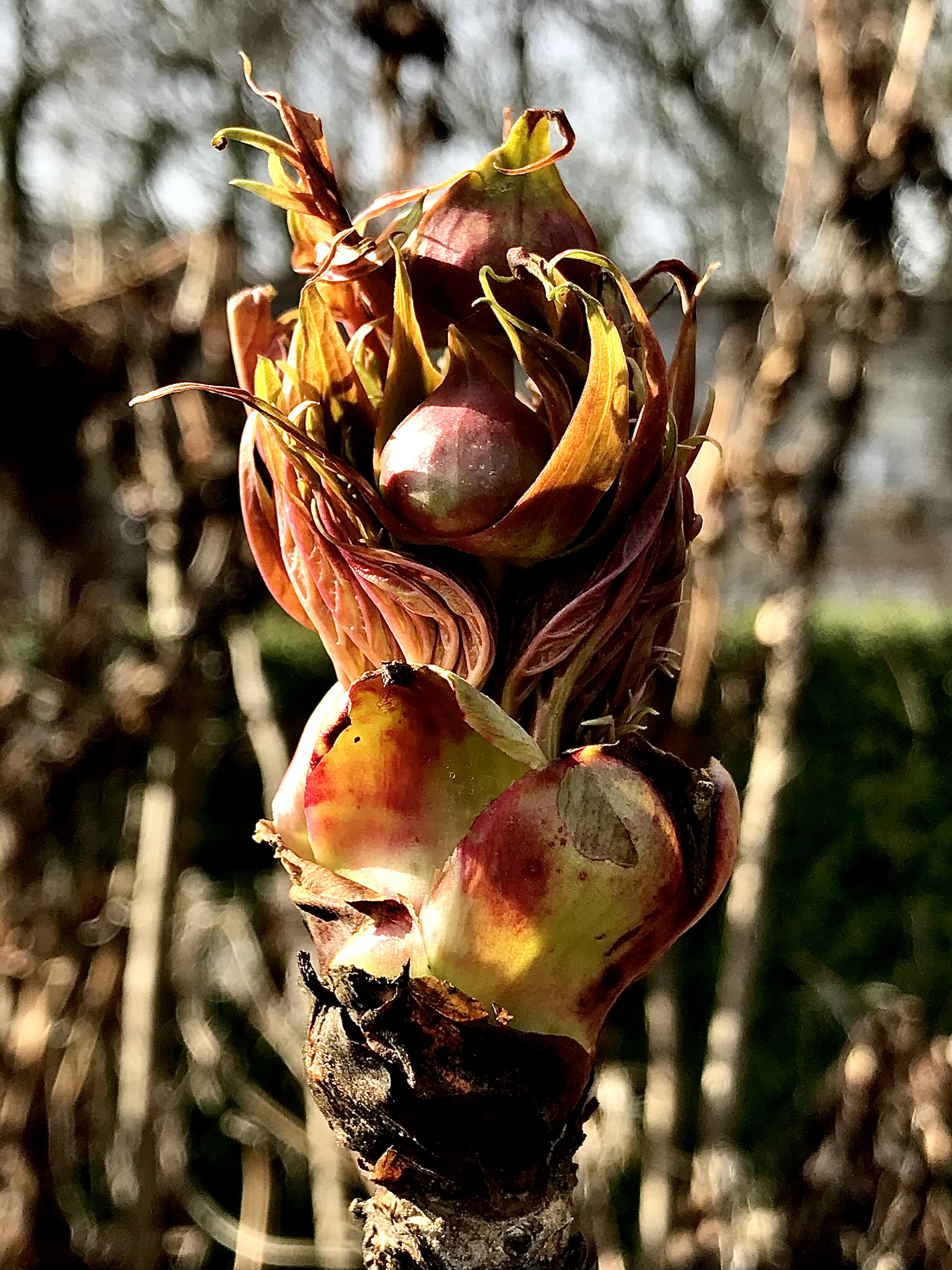
Newly-burst Spring bud, showing coppery, furled leaves and young flower bud above open bud scales, Berrington, Northumberland

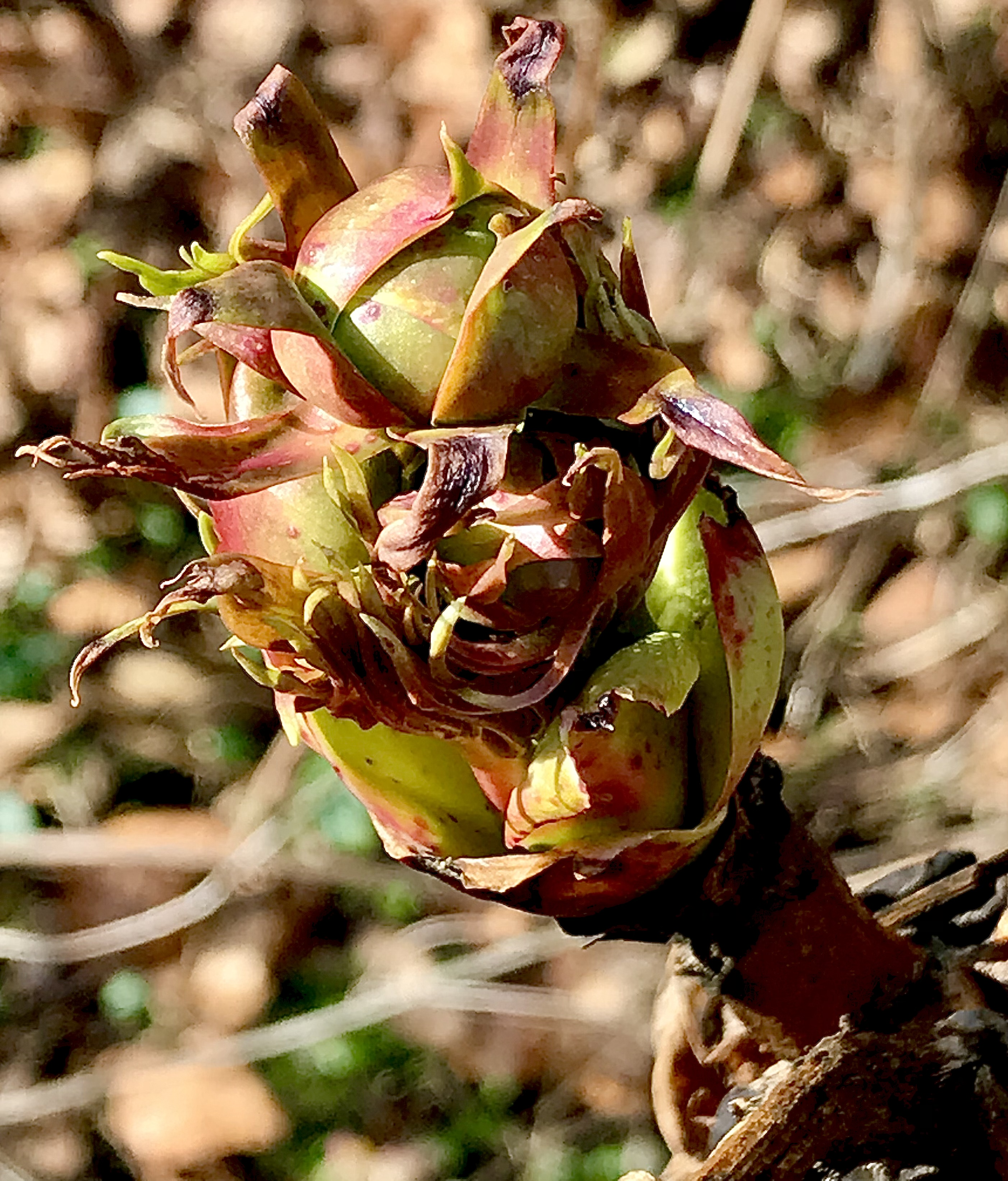
Same bud seen three-quarter-face, revealing young flower bud more clearly

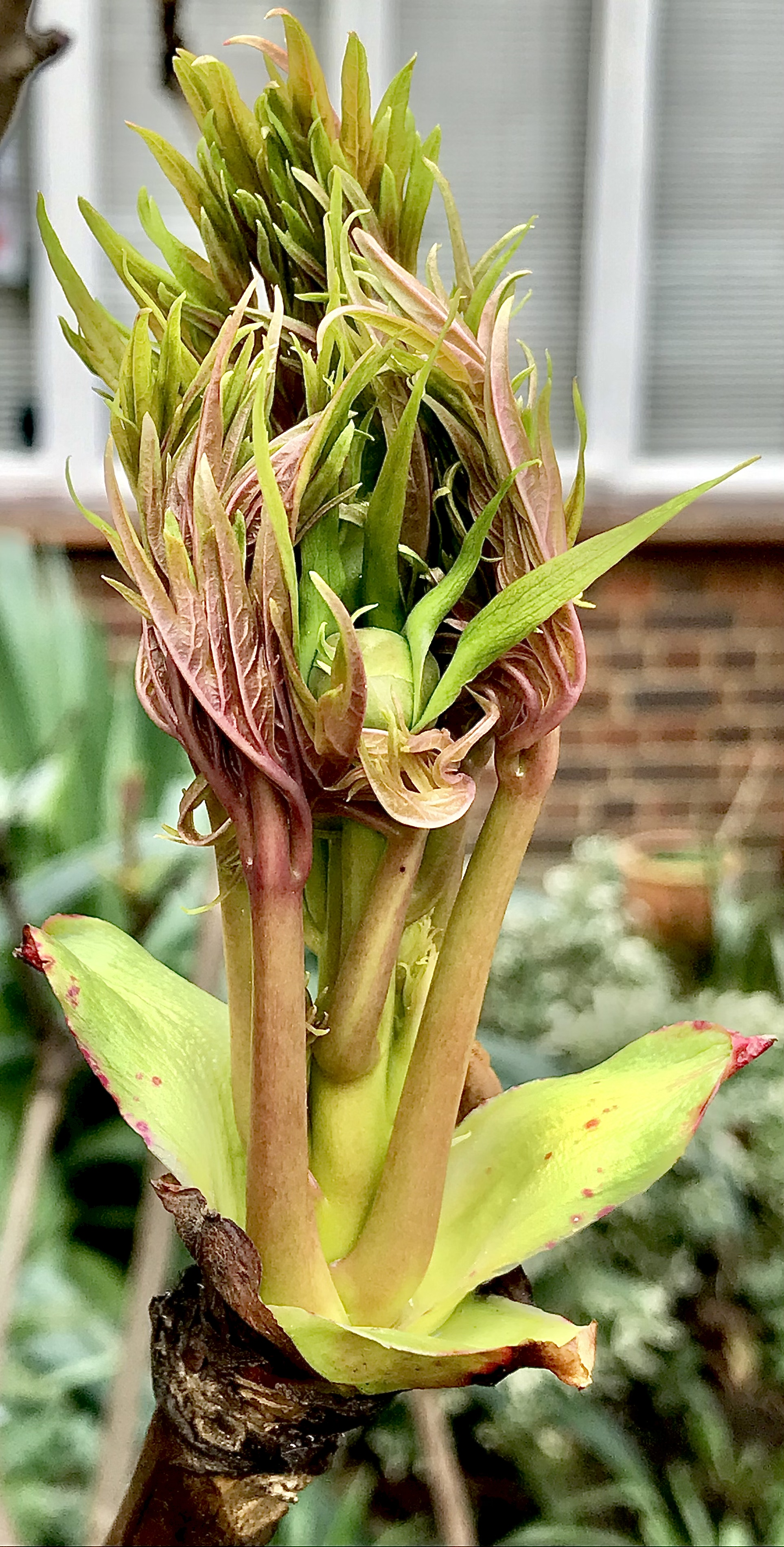
Elongation of petioles protruding from gaping bud scales as flowering shoot develops. West Ealing, London, U.K.

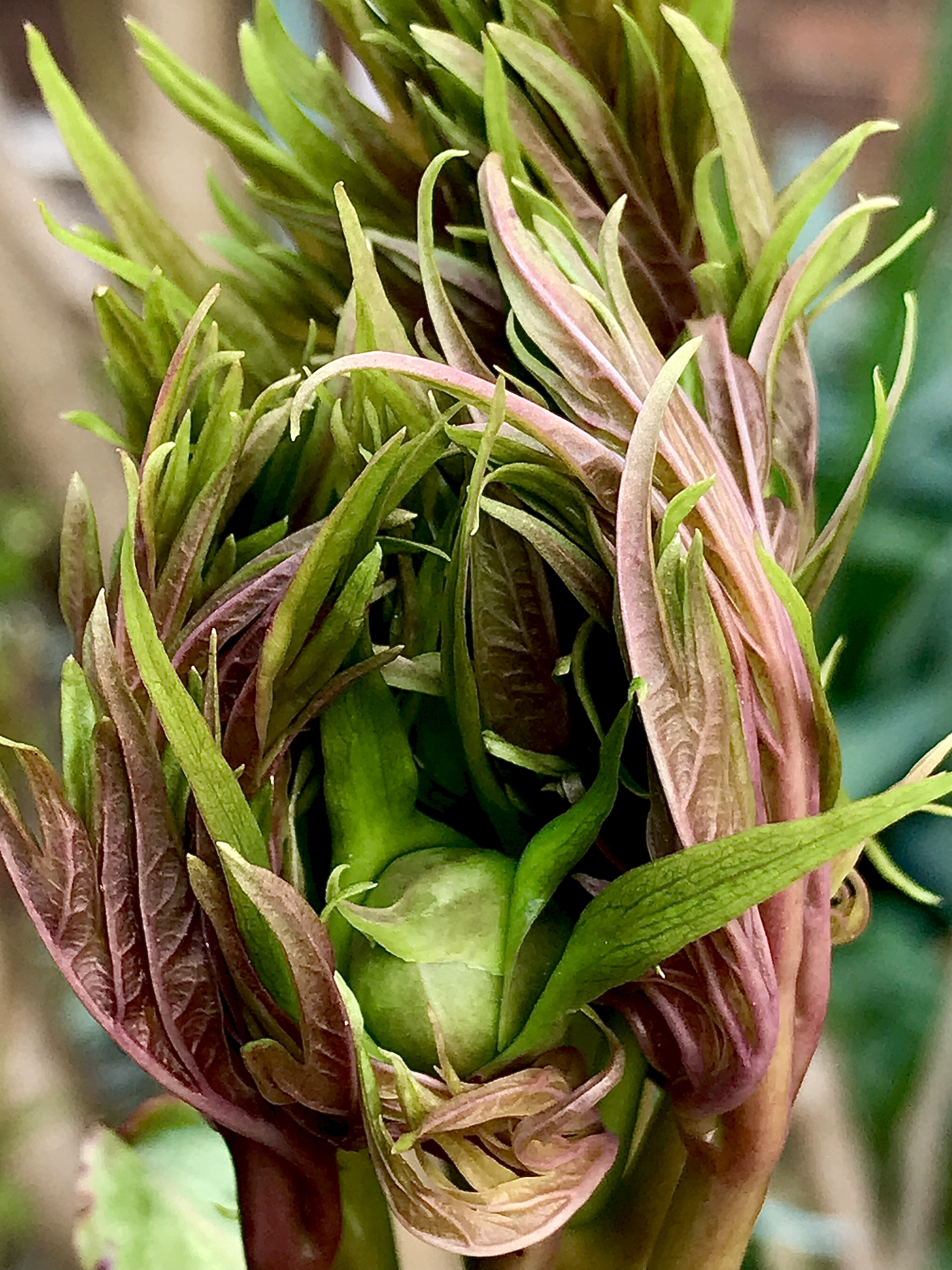
Closeup of flower bud starting to emerge from amongst clustered, feathery leaf blades

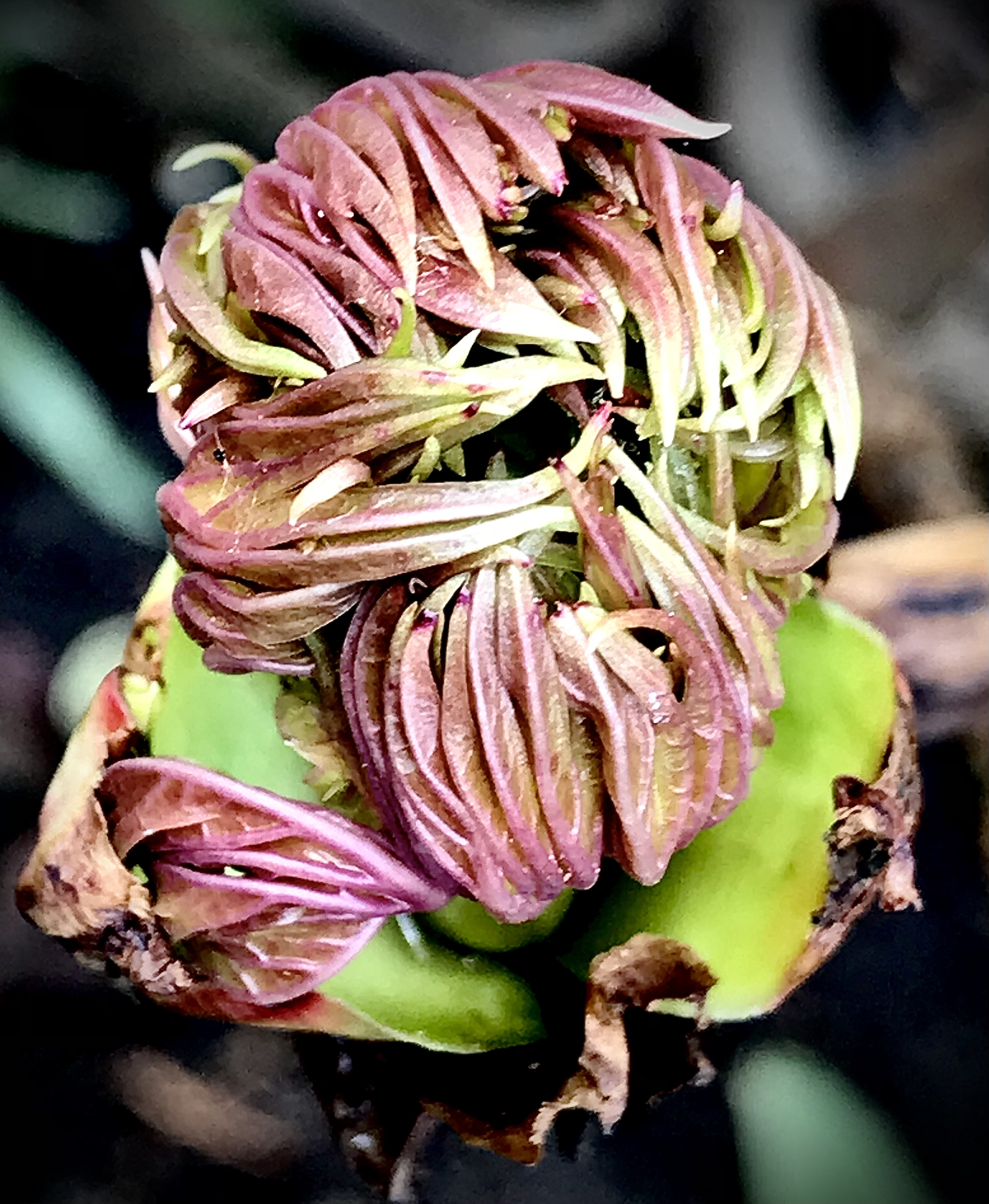
Top view of cluster of furled leaf blades emerging from Spring bud

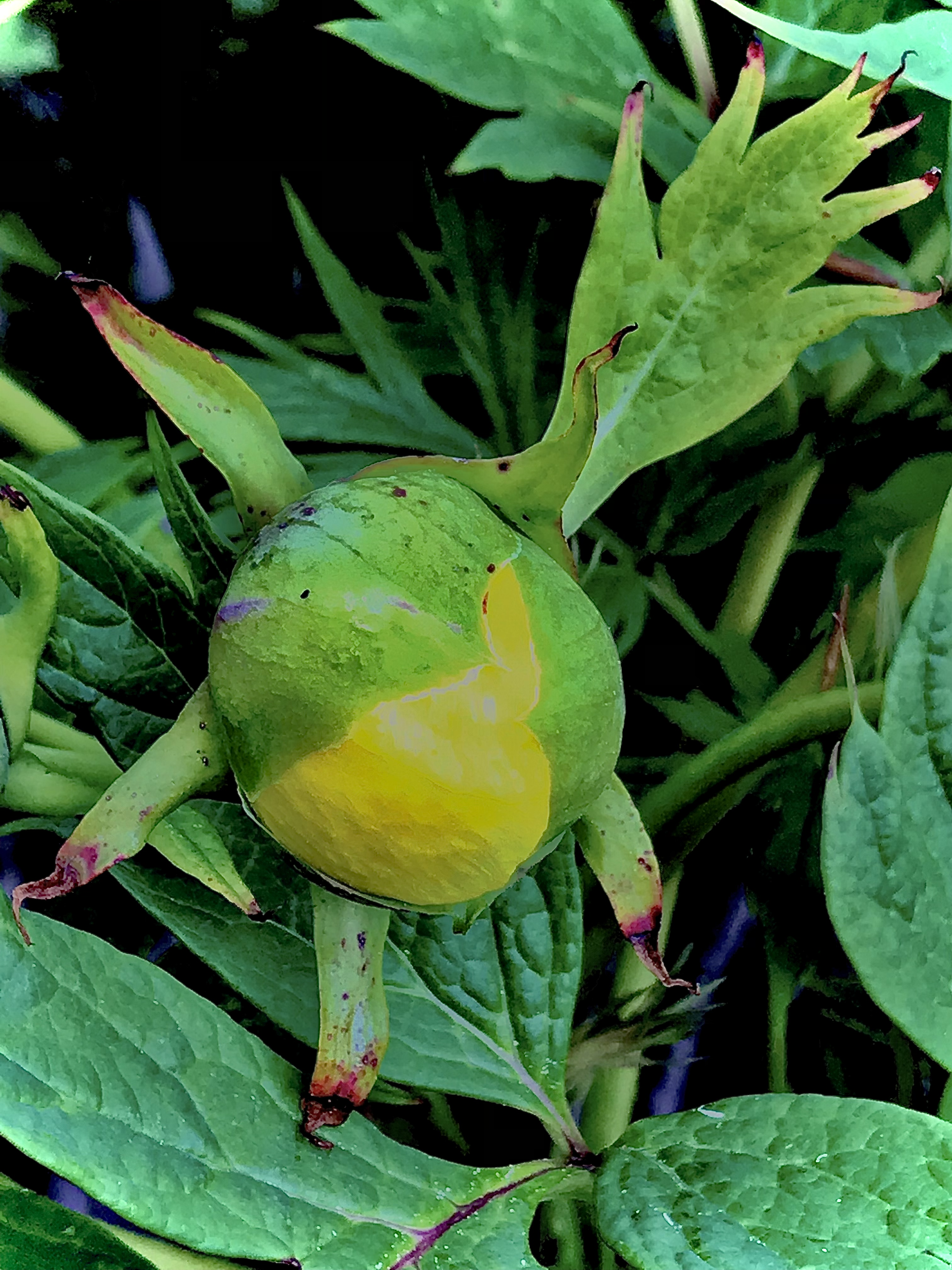
Globular flower bud, mature, but still tightly furled

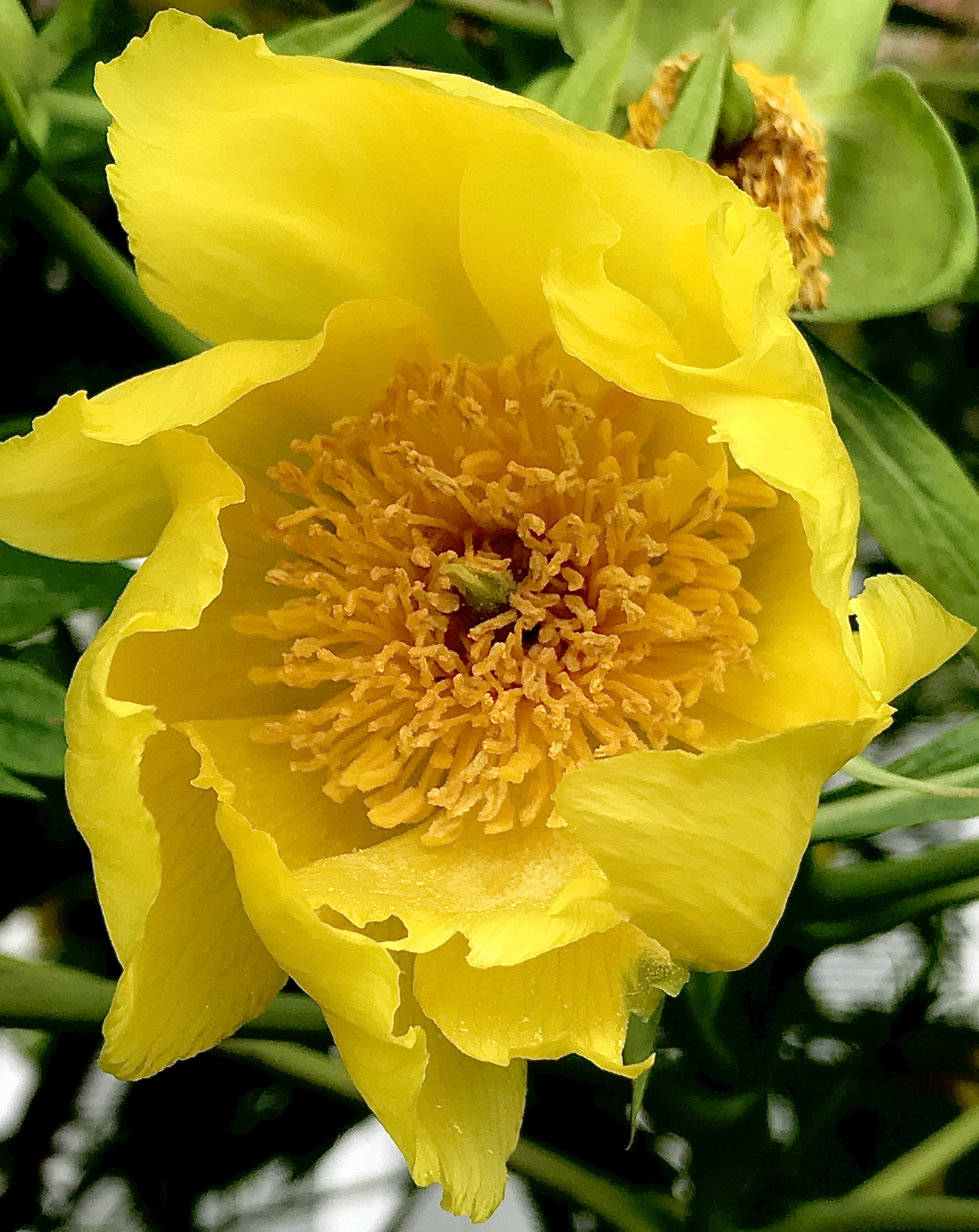
Single flower, full-face, showing ripening anthers and corolla aestivation

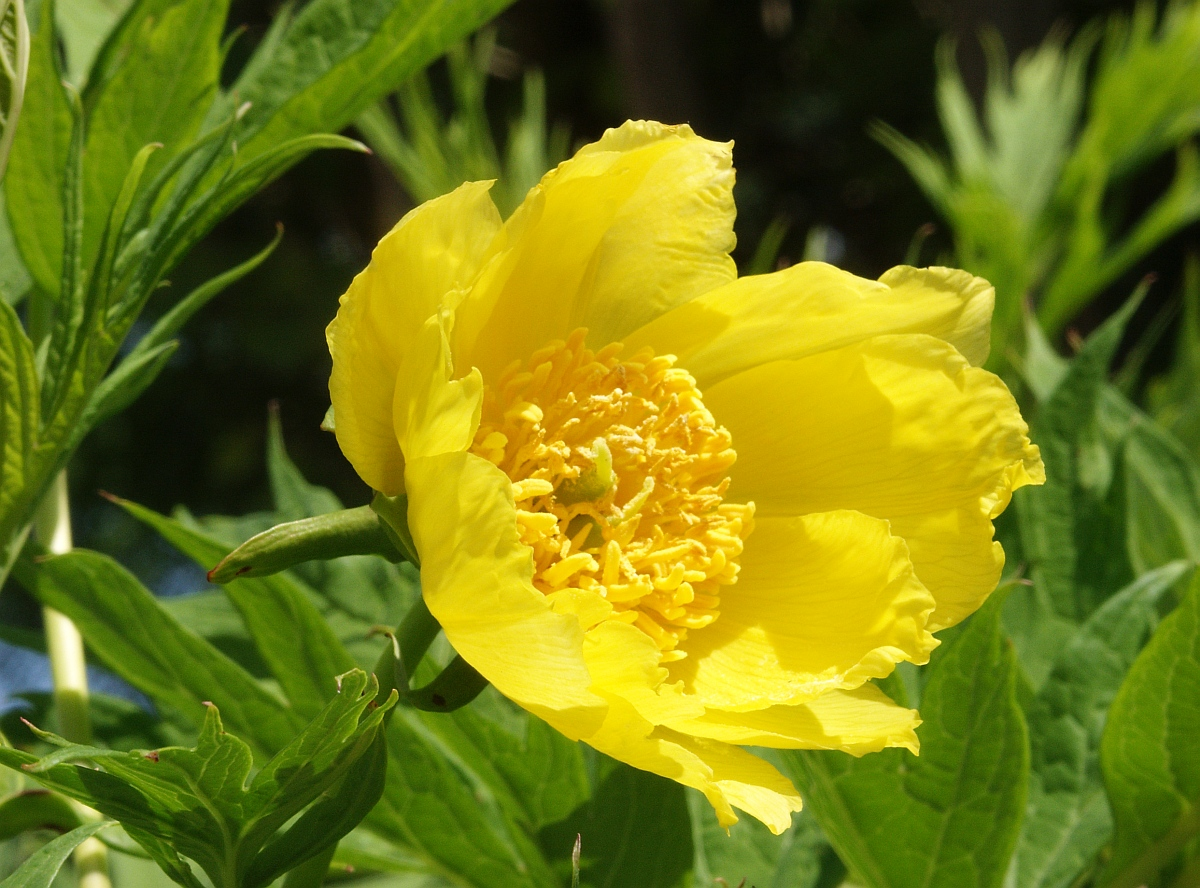
Single flower

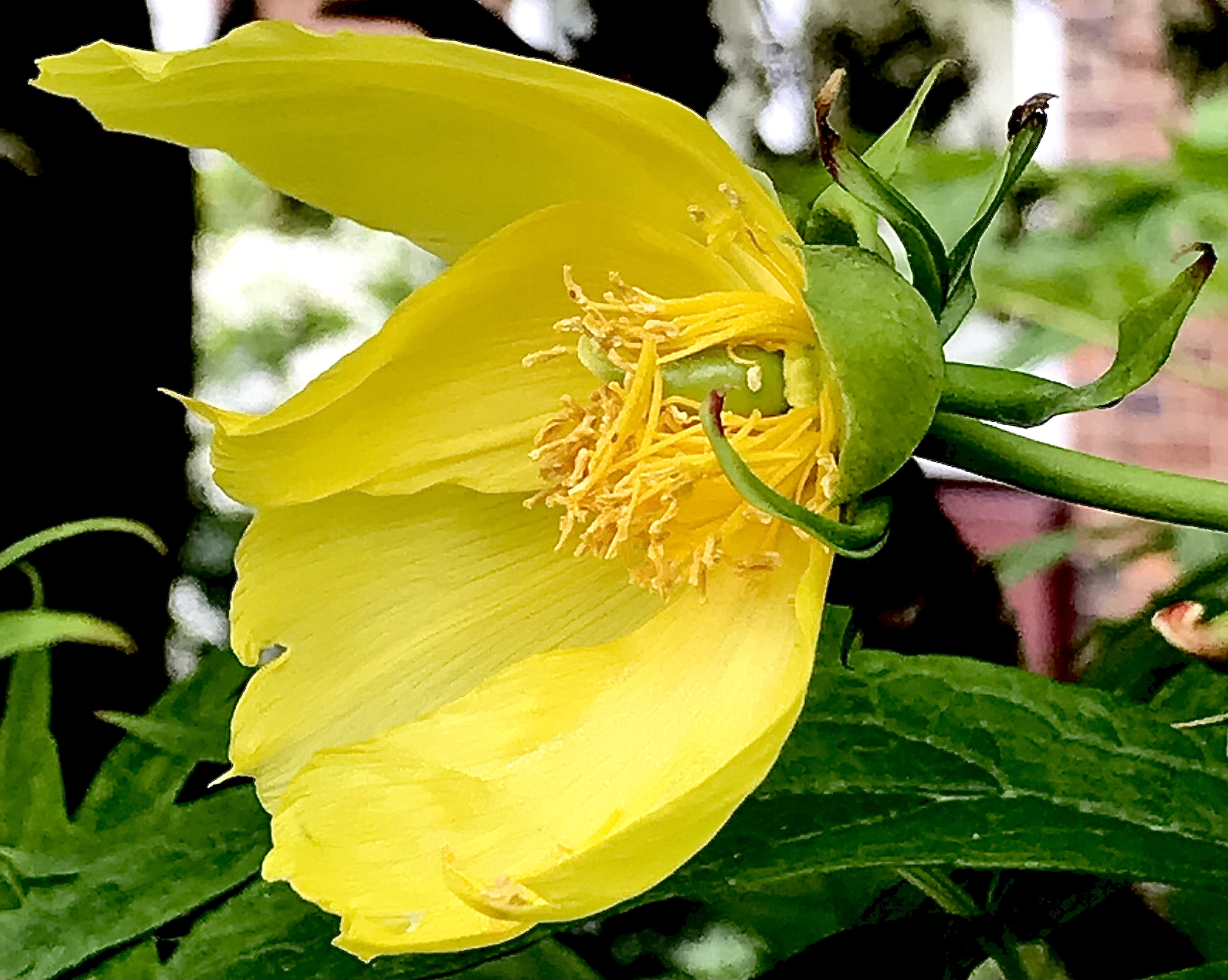
Cross-section of flower arising naturally from fall of some of petals

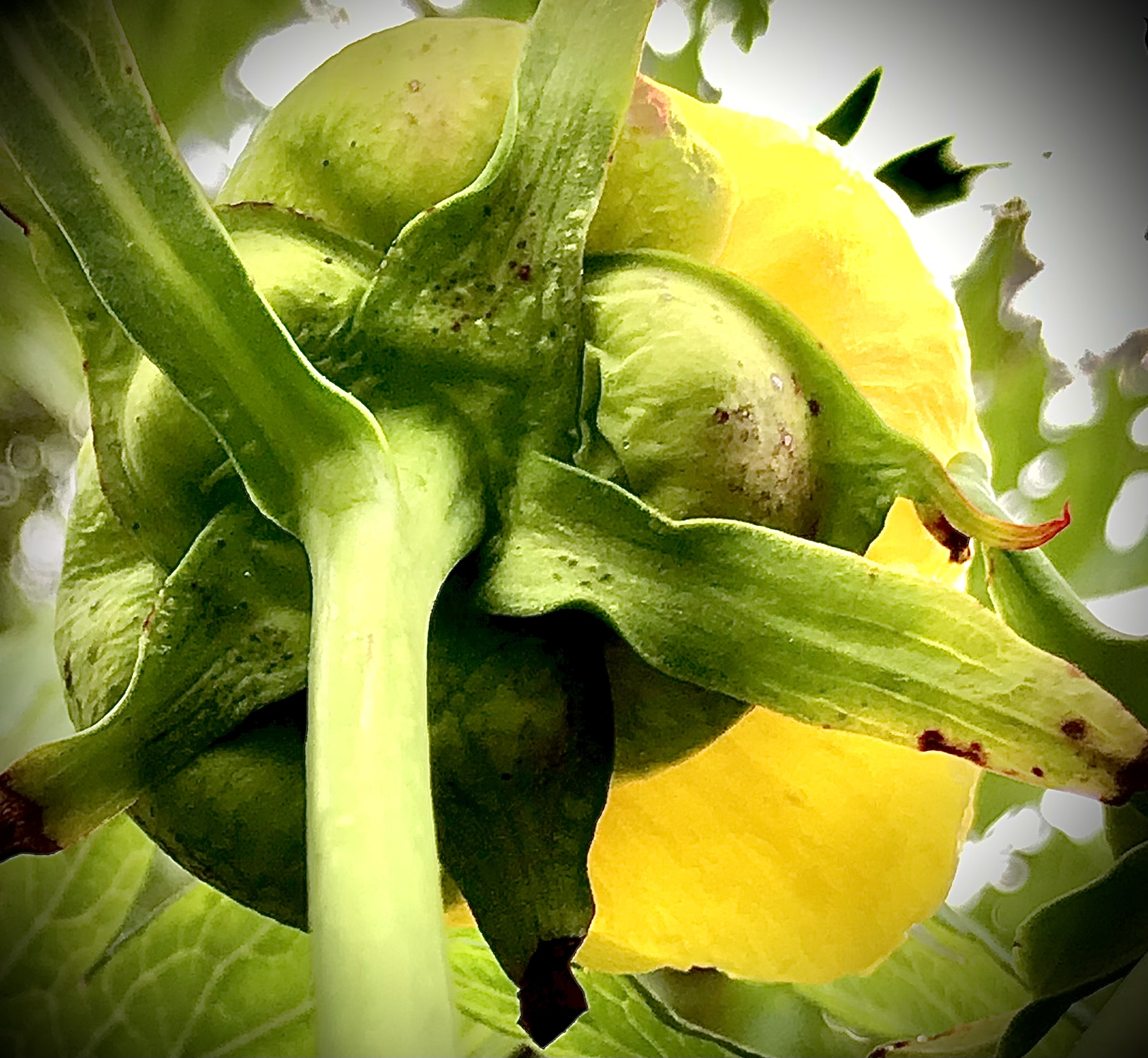
Underside of single flower, showing lanceolate bracts and bowl-shaped sepals tipped with long 'tails'

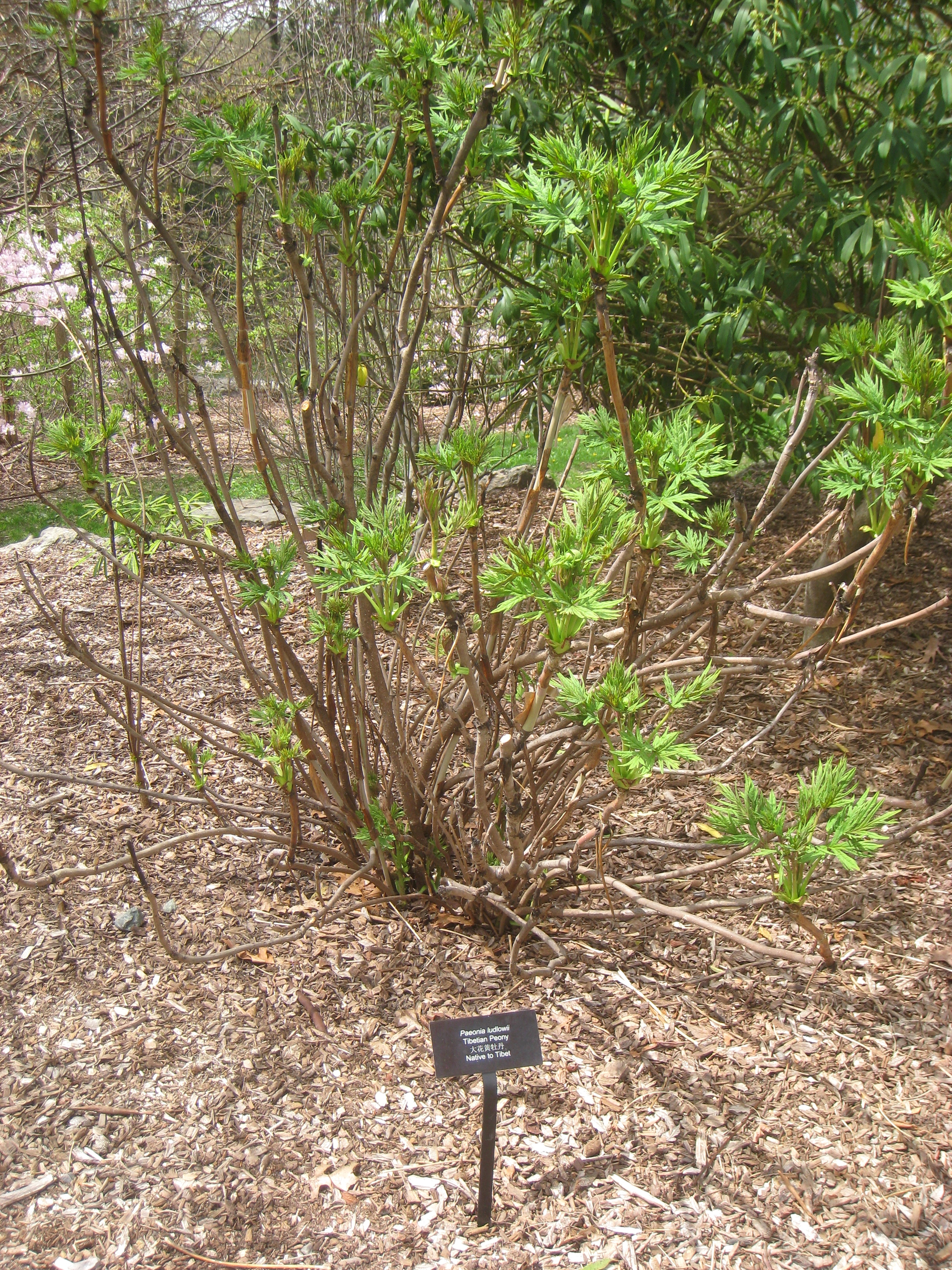
Cultivated plant in Arnold Arboretum, showing tufts of young leaves in Spring

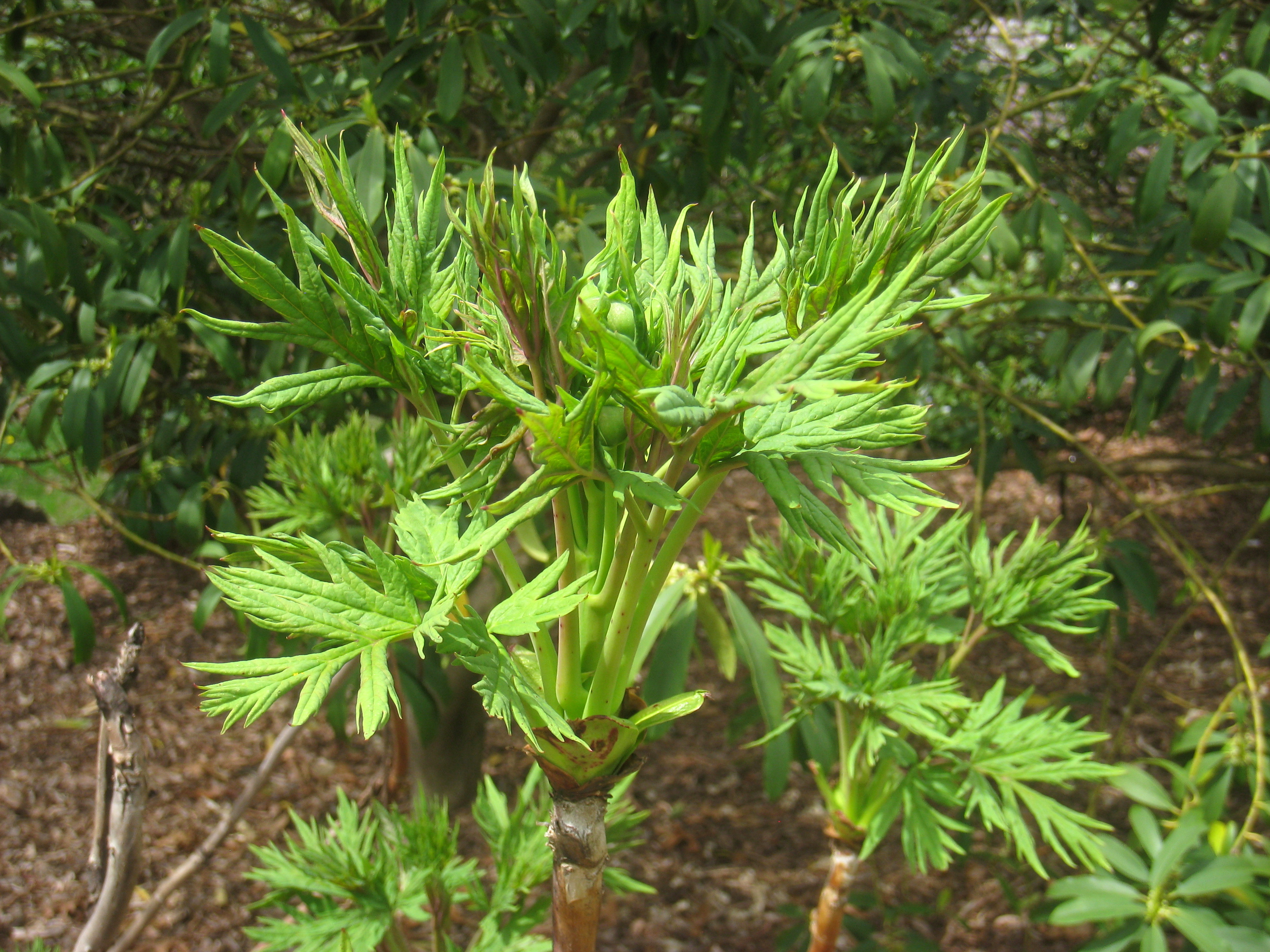
Detail of same specimen, showing young, leafy shoot with two flowerbuds

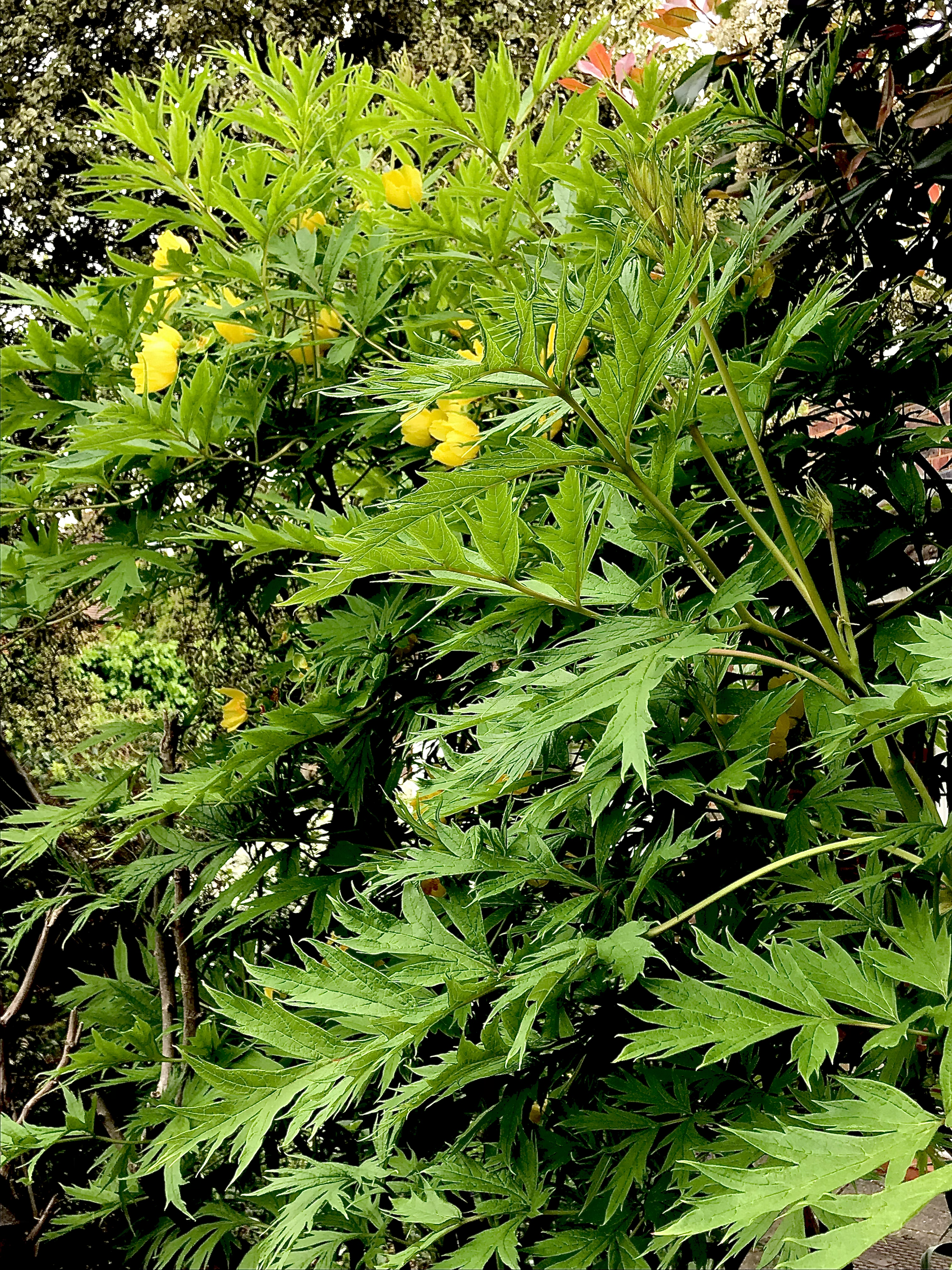
'Architectural' foliage, fully developed at time of flowering

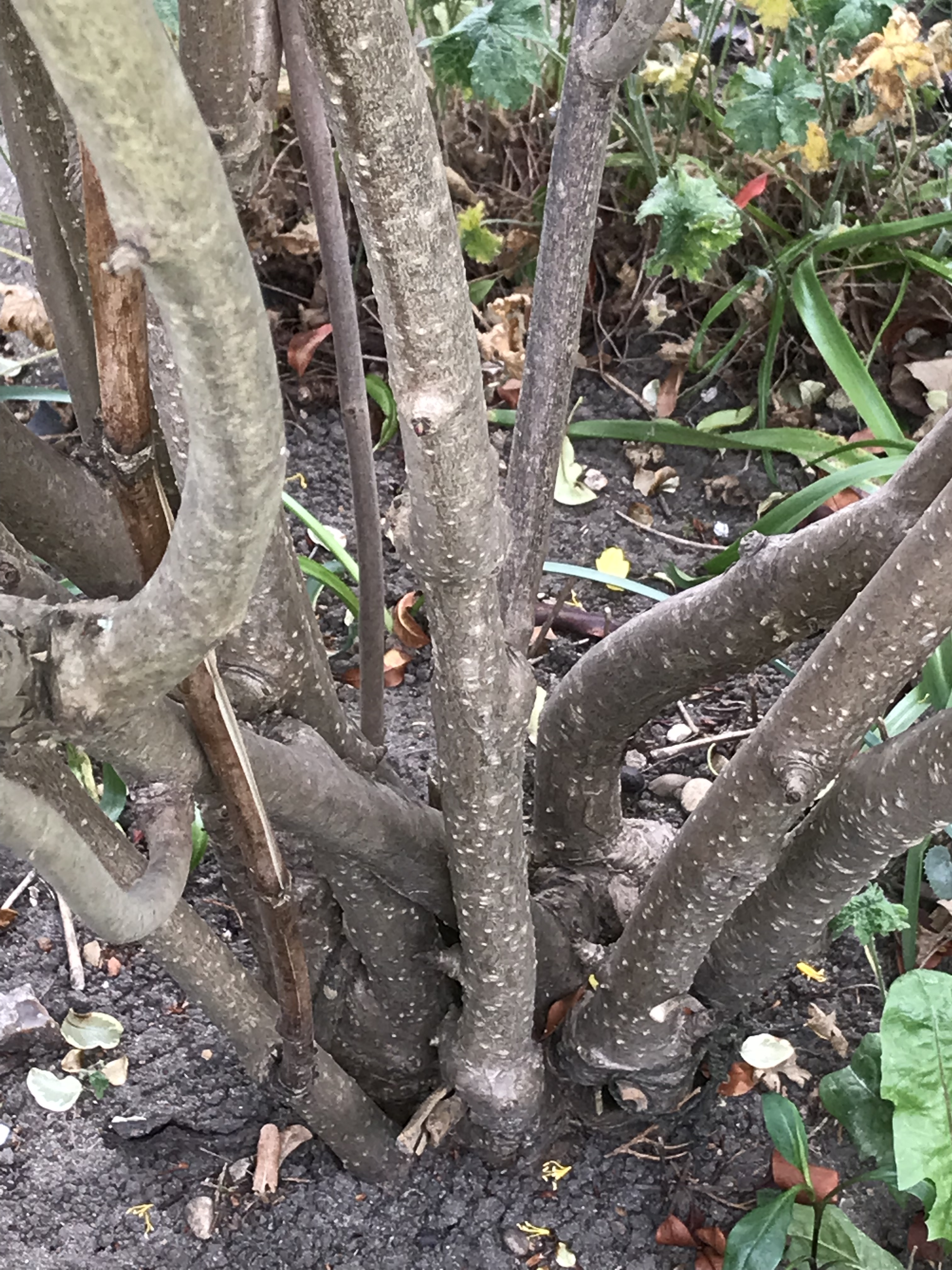
Bases of woody stems of a mature, cultivated specimen, showing grey bark with conspicuous lenticels

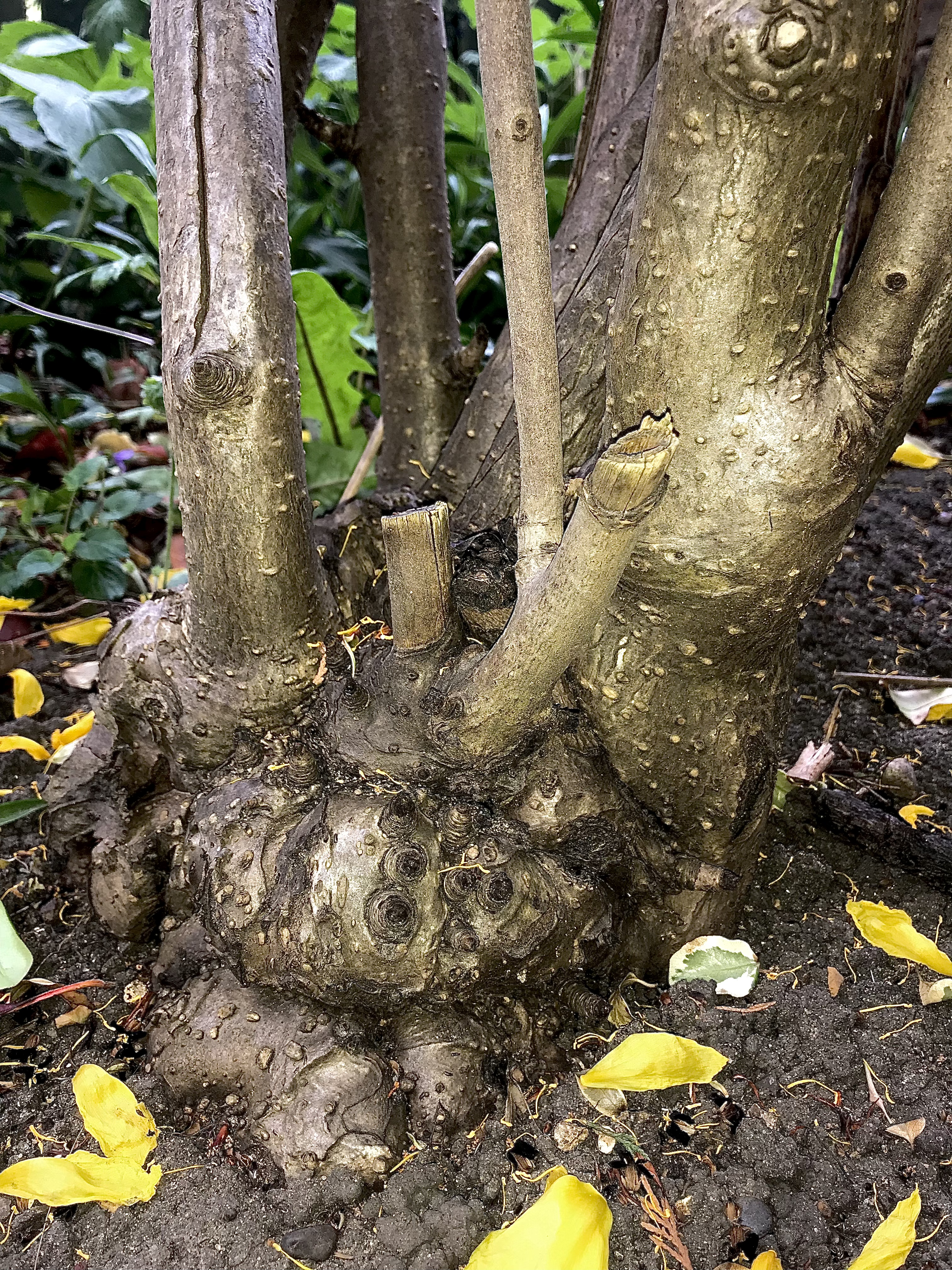
Gnarled root crown and main trunks, clad in grey bark, with prominent lenticels and leaf scars and surrounded by fallen petals

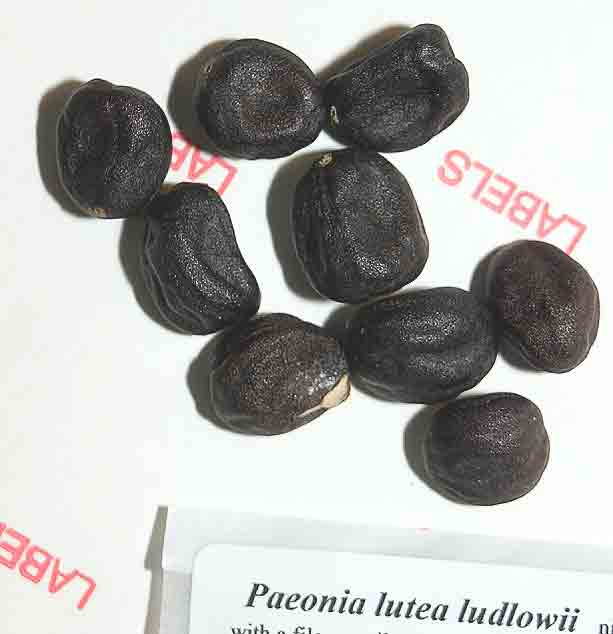
Old, slightly shrivelled seed from seed bank

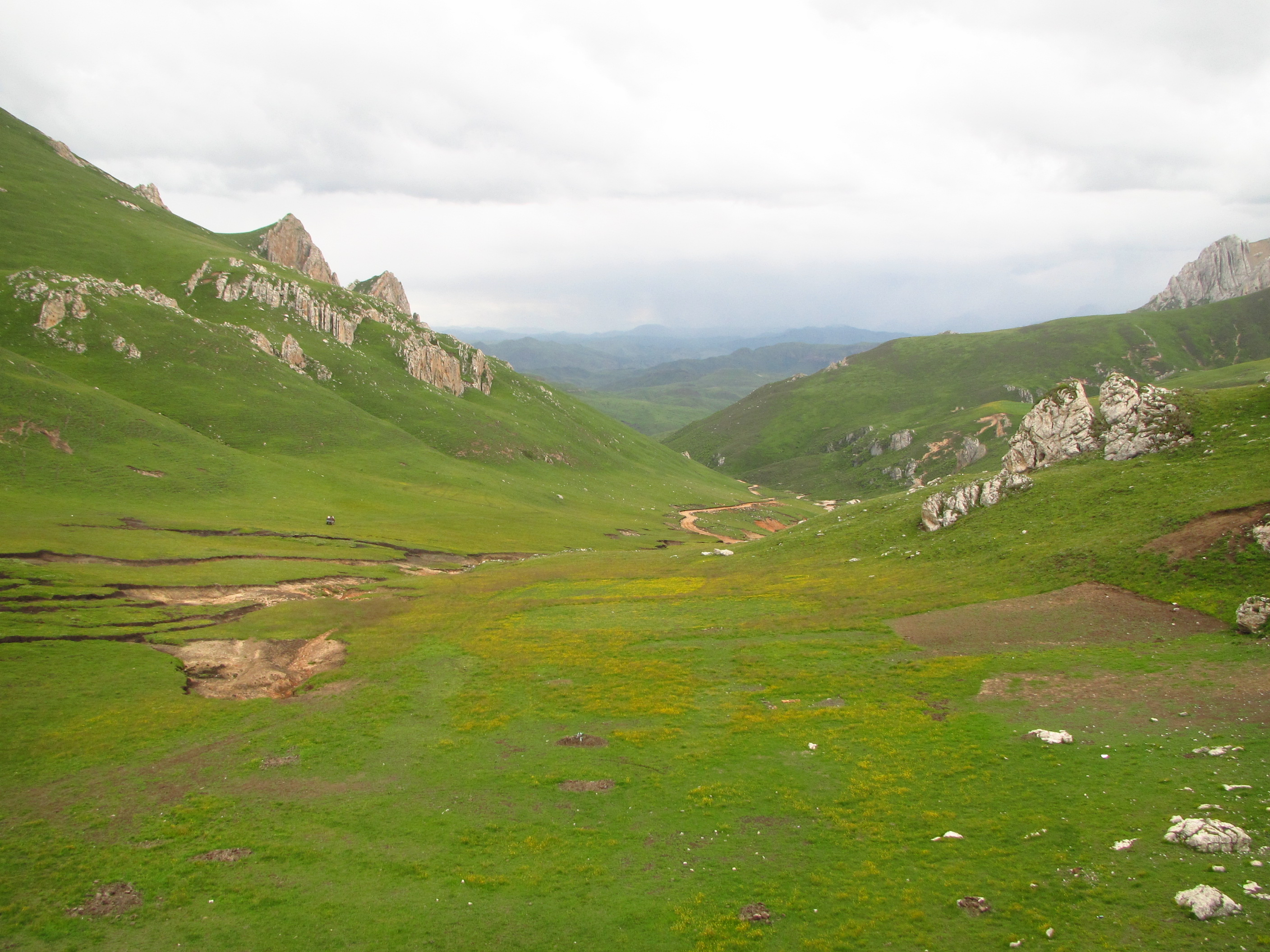
Landscape view in meadow and shrub zone of Southeastern Tibet (to which P. ludlowii is native)
