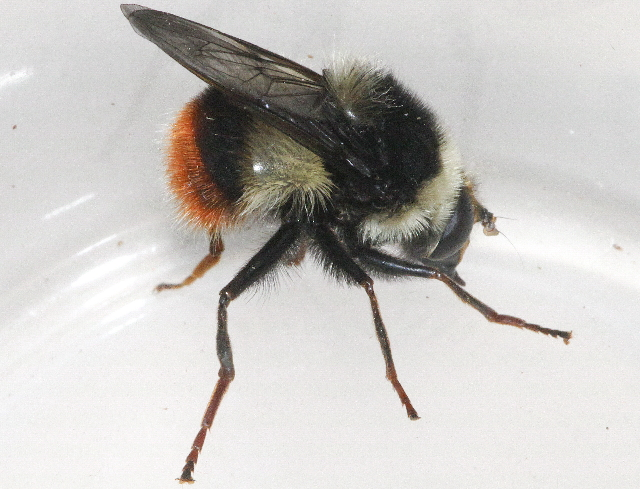

Scientific classification
- Kingdom: Animalia
- Phylum: Arthropoda
- Clade: Pancrustacea
- Class: Insecta
- Order: Diptera
- Family: Syrphidae
- Subfamily: Eristalinae
- Tribe: Milesiini
- Subtribe: Criorhinina
- Genus: Criorhina
- Species: C. caudata

Binomial name
- Criorhina caudata Curran, 1925

Synonyms
- Criorhina rufocaudata Nayar and Cole, 1969

= Criorhina caudata =

Species of fly

Criorhina caudata is a species of hoverfly in the family Syrphidae.

== Distribution ==
Canada, United States.
