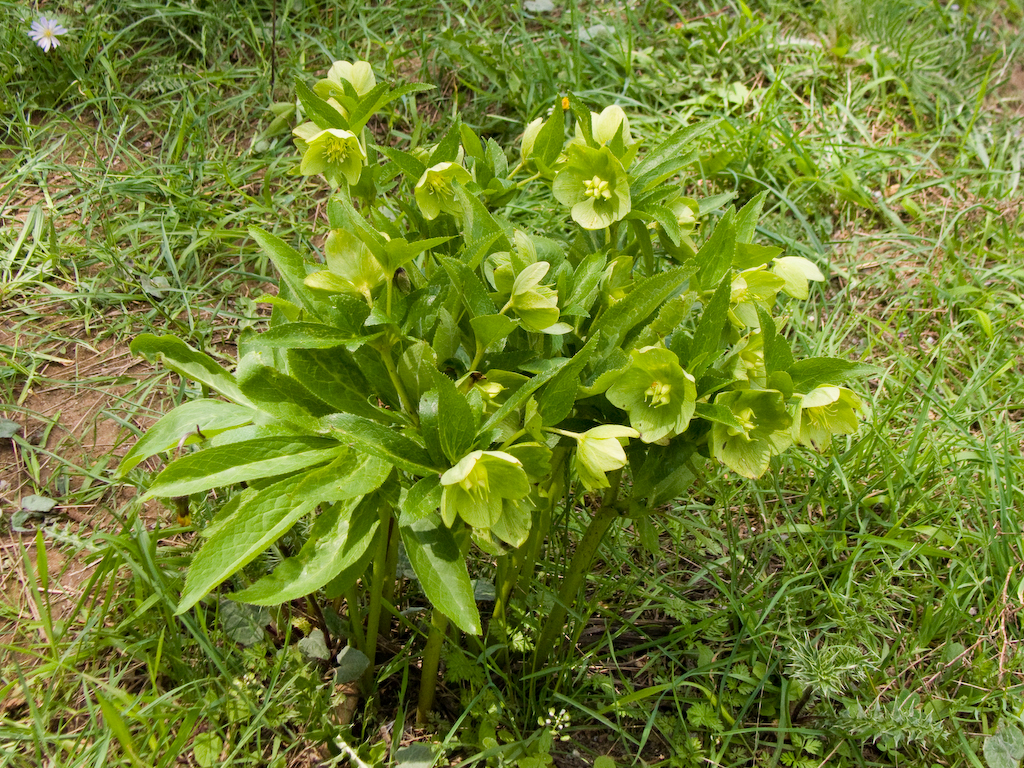

Scientific classification
- Kingdom: Plantae
- Clade: Tracheophytes
- Clade: Angiosperms
- Clade: Eudicots
- Order: Ranunculales
- Family: Ranunculaceae
- Genus: Helleborus
- Species: H. cyclophyllus

Binomial name
- Helleborus cyclophyllus (A.Braun) Boissier

Synonyms
- Helleborus odorus subsp. cyclophyllus (A.Braun) Strid

= Helleborus cyclophyllus =

Species of flowering plant

Helleborus cyclophyllus is a flowering perennial plant in the family Ranunculaceae. It is native to Albania, Bulgaria, Greece, and Yugoslavia. It is similar in appearance to other hellebores found in the Balkan region. It is acaulescent, meaning it lacks a stem with leaves, instead sending up a leafless flower stalk. The green leaves are palmate and basal, spreading at the ground. The flowers are green to yellow-green and 2 to 3 inches in diameter.
