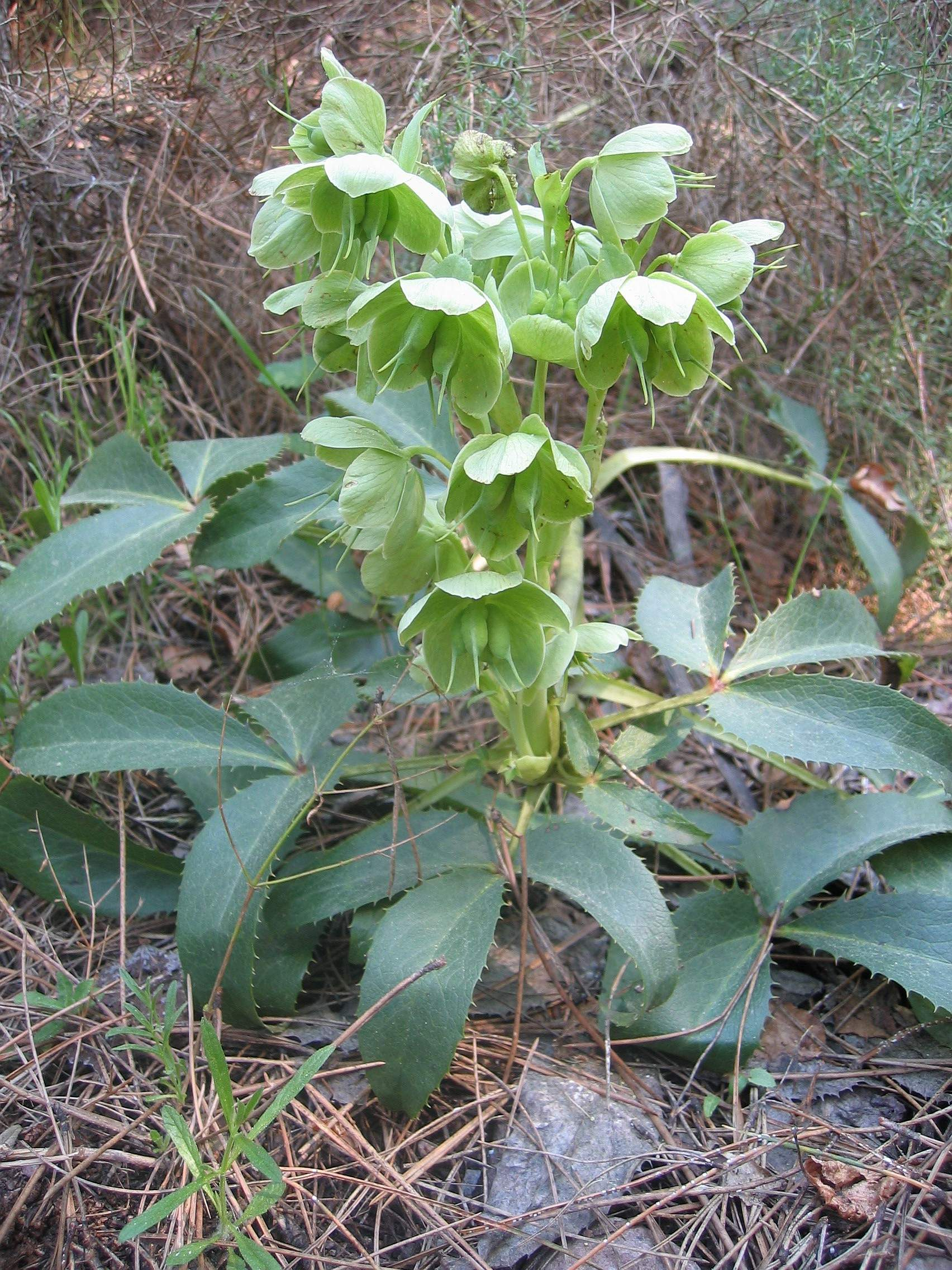
- The flowers have persistent petal-like sepals surrounding the follicles

Scientific classification
- Kingdom: Plantae
- Clade: Embryophytes
- Clade: Tracheophytes
- Clade: Spermatophytes
- Clade: Angiosperms
- Clade: Eudicots
- Order: Ranunculales
- Family: Ranunculaceae
- Genus: Helleborus
- Species: H. argutifolius

Binomial name
- Helleborus argutifolius Viv.

= Helleborus argutifolius =

Species of flowering plant

Helleborus argutifolius, the holly-leaved hellebore, or Corsican hellebore, syn. H. corsicus, H. lividus subsp. corsicus is a species of flowering plant in the family Ranunculaceae, native to Corsica and Sardinia, growing on hillsides, ravines, woodlands and roadsides. It is an evergreen perennial growing to 120 cm (47 in) tall by 90 cm (3 ft) wide, with large leathery leaves comprising three spiny-toothed leaflets, and green bowl-shaped flowers in late winter and early spring.

The Latin specific epithet argutifolius means “with sharp-toothed leaves”.

In cultivation Helleborus argutifolius hybridises readily with the closely related H. lividus. H. argutifolius has gained the Royal Horticultural Society's Award of Garden Merit.
