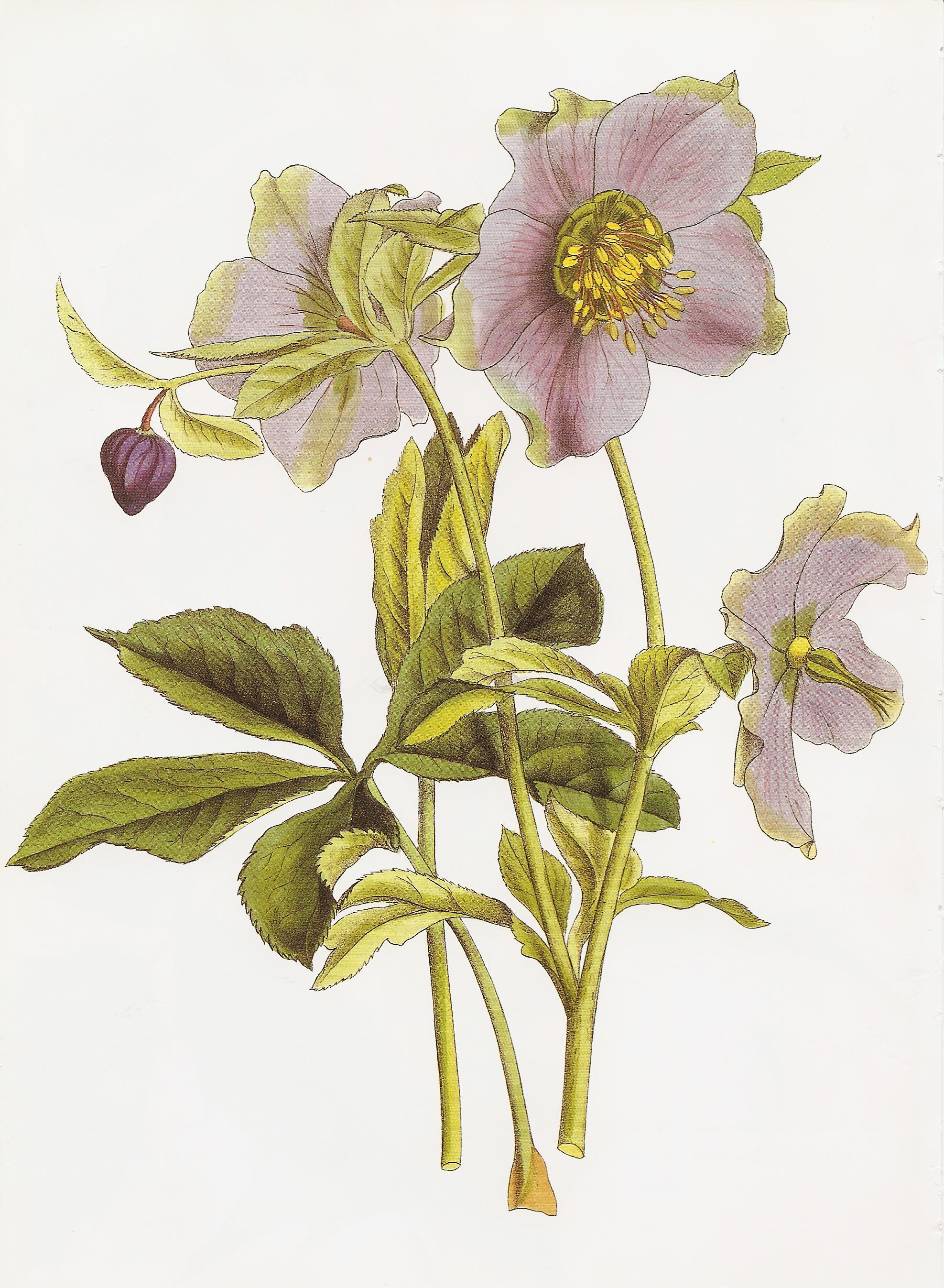

Scientific classification
- Kingdom: Plantae
- Clade: Tracheophytes
- Clade: Angiosperms
- Clade: Eudicots
- Order: Ranunculales
- Family: Ranunculaceae
- Genus: Helleborus
- Species: H. atrorubens

Binomial name
- Helleborus atrorubens Waldst. & Kit.

= Helleborus atrorubens =

Species of plant

Helleborus atrorubens is a species of hellebore in the family Ranunculaceae described in 1812. According to the Global Biodiversity Information Facility website, H. atrorubens is a subspecies of Helleborus dumetorum.
