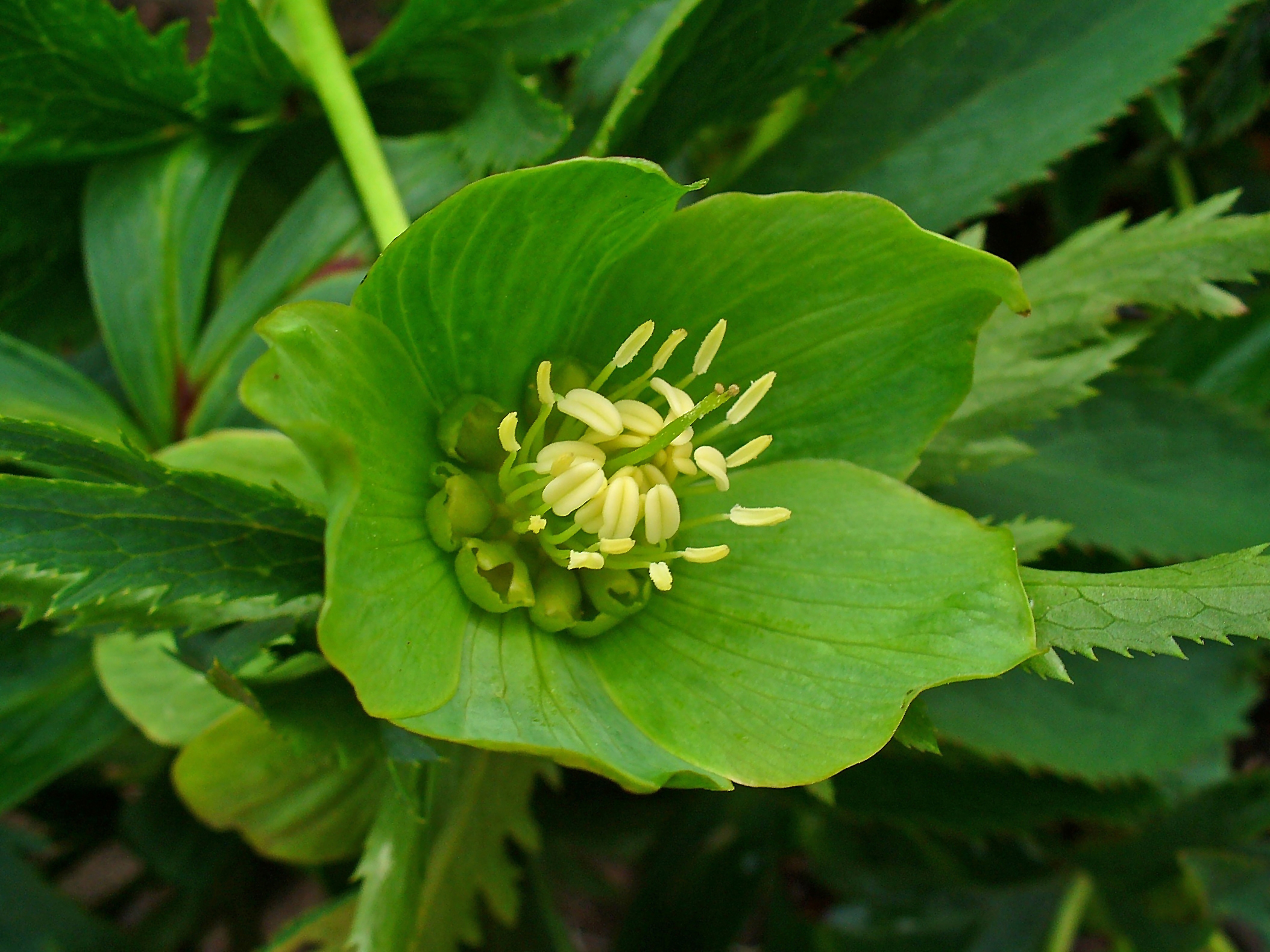

Scientific classification
- Kingdom: Plantae
- Clade: Embryophytes
- Clade: Tracheophytes
- Clade: Spermatophytes
- Clade: Angiosperms
- Clade: Eudicots
- Order: Ranunculales
- Family: Ranunculaceae
- Genus: Helleborus
- Species: H. viridis

Binomial name
- Helleborus viridis L.

= Helleborus viridis =

Species of flowering plant

Helleborus viridis, commonly called green hellebore, is a species of flowering plant in the buttercup family Ranunculaceae, native to central and western Europe, including southern England. All parts of the plant are poisonous. Other common names recorded include bastard hellebore, bear's foot, and boar's foot.

== Description ==
It was one of many plants first described by Linnaeus in volume one of the 1753 (tenth) edition of his Species Plantarum. The Latin species epithet viridis means 'green'.

Two subspecies are recognised:

- Helleborus viridis subsp. viridis from central Europe and the maritime Alps
- Helleborus viridis subsp. occidentalis from western Europe including the British Isles.

Growing to around 60 cm (24 in) tall, the green hellebore is a semi-evergreen perennial plant. The flowers appear in spring (February to April). They have five large green oval sepals with pointed tips, and seven to twelve much smaller petals. The roots are rhizomatous. Subspecies viridis has flowers of 4–5 cm (1.6–2.0 in) diameter and leaves covered with fine hairs, while the flowers of subspecies occidentalis are smaller (3–4 cm diameter) and its leaves are smooth.

== Distribution and habitat ==
The green hellebore is found in western and central Europe, east to eastern Austria and south to northern Italy. It grows on limestone and chalk-based soils in the south of England.

== Ecology ==
It has become invasive in North America, Scandinavia, the Netherlands, and northern Germany.

== Toxicity ==
Consumption of any part of the plant can lead to severe vomiting and seizures.
