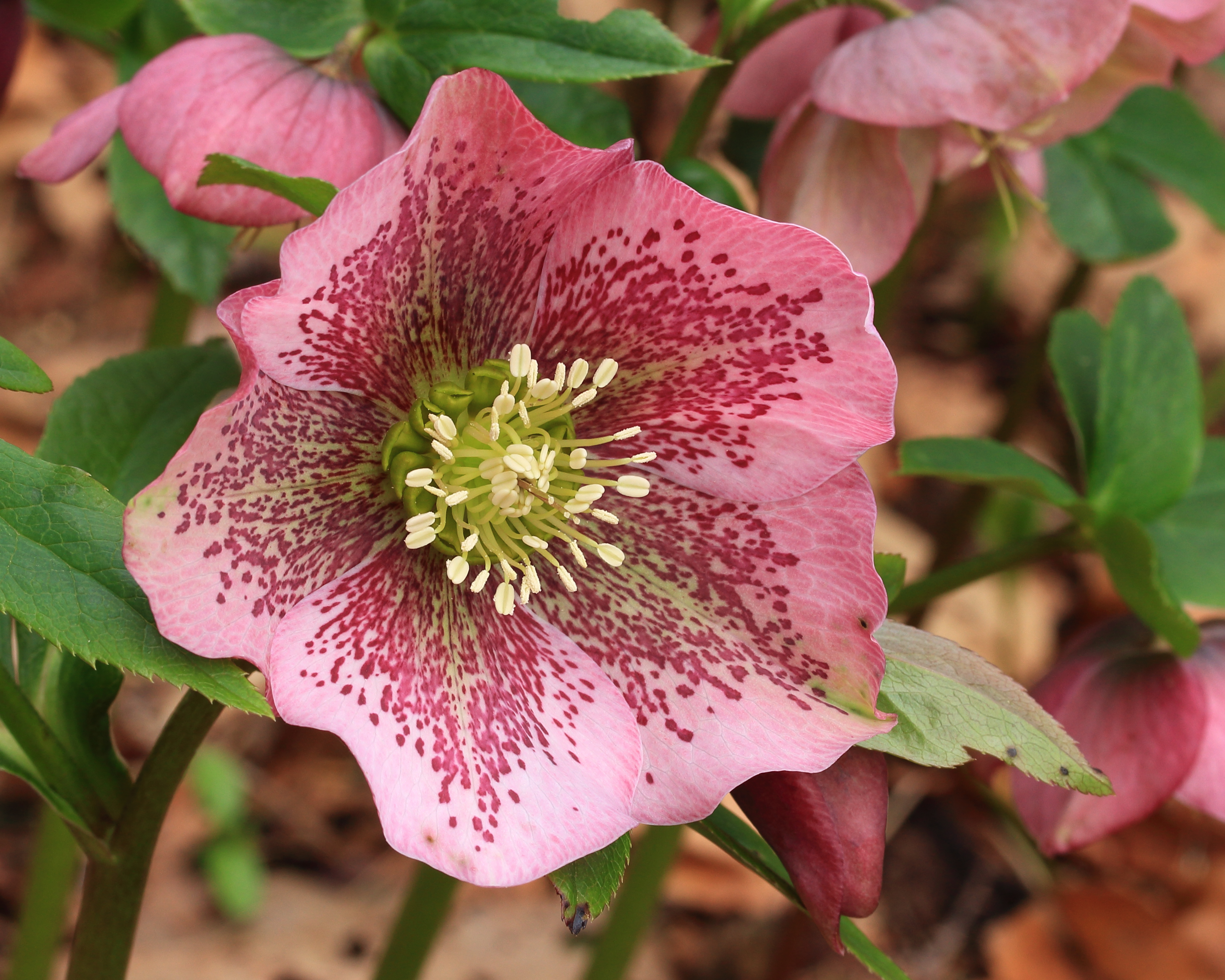

Scientific classification
- Kingdom: Plantae
- Clade: Embryophytes
- Clade: Tracheophytes
- Clade: Angiosperms
- Clade: Eudicots
- Order: Ranunculales
- Family: Ranunculaceae
- Genus: Helleborus
- Species: H. orientalis

Binomial name
- Helleborus orientalis Lam.

= Helleborus orientalis =

Species of plant

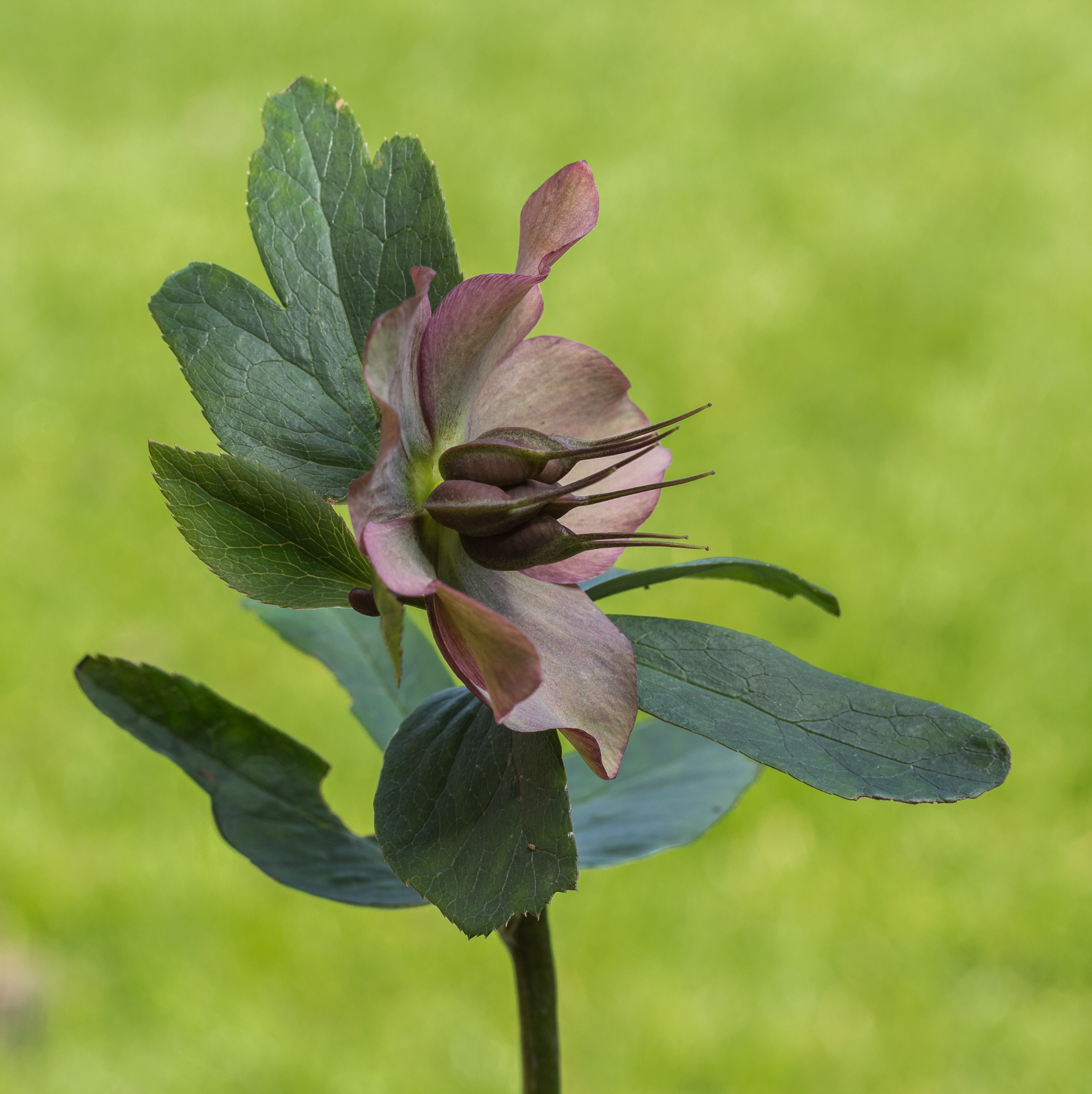
H. orientalis with swollen seedpods, Netherlands

Helleborus orientalis, or the Lenten rose, is a perennial flowering plant and species of hellebore in the buttercup family, Ranunculaceae, native to Greece and Turkey.

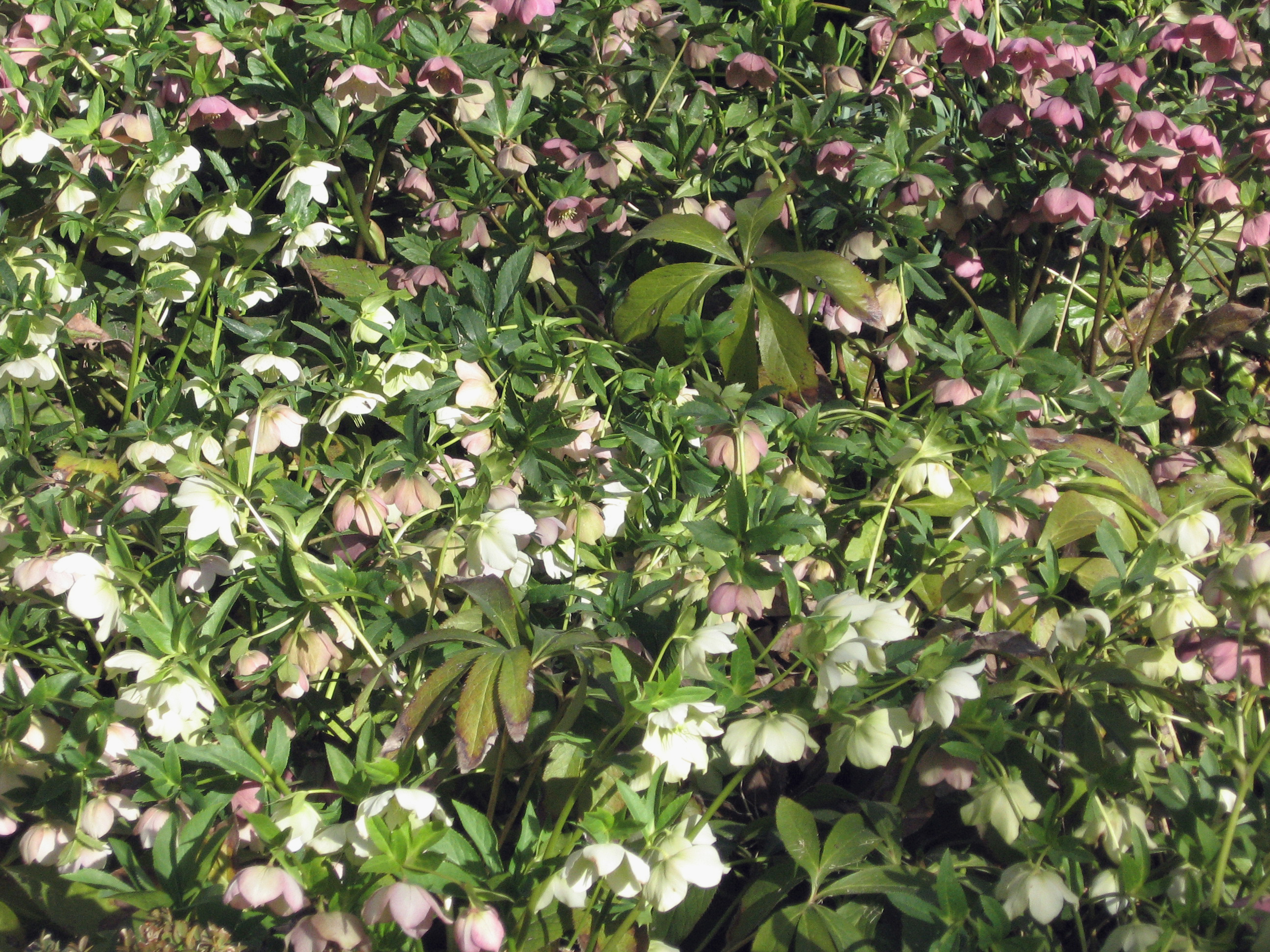
Bed of Helleborus orientalis.

== Description ==
This perennial reaches 28–45 cm (11–18 in) tall, with glossy green palmate leaves composed of 7–9 leaflets with serrated leaf margins. Leathery in texture, the leaves are evergreen. The cup-shaped pendent flowers appear in late winter and spring, arising in groups of 1–4 on the ends of thick stems rising above the foliage. They have yellow stamens. All parts of the Lenten rose are poisonous. Sap coming into contact with the skin may cause temporary irritation, while ingestion of large quantities can cause burning of mouth and throat, vomiting, abdominal cramping, and diarrhea.

== Taxonomy ==
Jean-Baptiste Lamarck described the species in 1789, giving it its current name of Helleborus orientalis ("Hellébore du Levant"). Within the genus Helleborus, it has been classified in the section Helleborastrum, and is closely related to the other eight species in the section. These species are all highly variable and hybridise with each other freely.

The Latin species name orientalis means "eastern". The common name "Lenten" refers to the period of Lent.

== Cultivation ==
The Lenten rose is suited to shaded or part-shaded positions, in soil rich in humus. Cultivated varieties have a wide array of colours. It is hardy in USDA hardiness zones 4–9 (down to −15 to −20 °C (5 to −4 °F)). German planters began breeding H. orientalis in the mid-19th century, enhanced by new material from the Caucasus via St Petersburg Botanic Garden. New varieties were soon introduced to the United Kingdom. Interest peaked in the late 19th century, but the genus had fallen out of favour by the 1920s. The Lenten rose was revived in horticulture in the 1960s by Helen Ballard, who bred many new varieties. Cultivated varieties can have white, green, pink to maroon and purple or spotted flowers.
