= Christmas flowers =

Flowers used as Christmas decoration

Christmas flowers are the popular flowers used during the festive season of Christmas. In many nations, seasonal flowers and plants such as Poinsettia, Christmas cactus, holly, Christmas rose, ivy and mistletoe form a major part of traditional Christmas decoration.

== North America ==
=== Poinsettia ===
The ancient Aztecs (ruling tribe in central Mexico at the time of contact with Europe) prized the poinsettia as a symbol of purity. Centuries later, Mexico's early Christians adopted the poinsettia as their prized Christmas Eve flower. The Mexican poinsettia, known as the Christmas Flower in North America, is used in most Christmas decorations, owing to its bright red color and its blooming season coinciding with the Christmas holiday season. However, florist dye them in common colors or even add shimmers to make them much more visually engaging during Christmas.

=== Christmas cactus ===
Christmas cactus, also known as orchid cactus, often blooms around Christmas time. There are a number of different cactus species sold as "Christmas cactus".

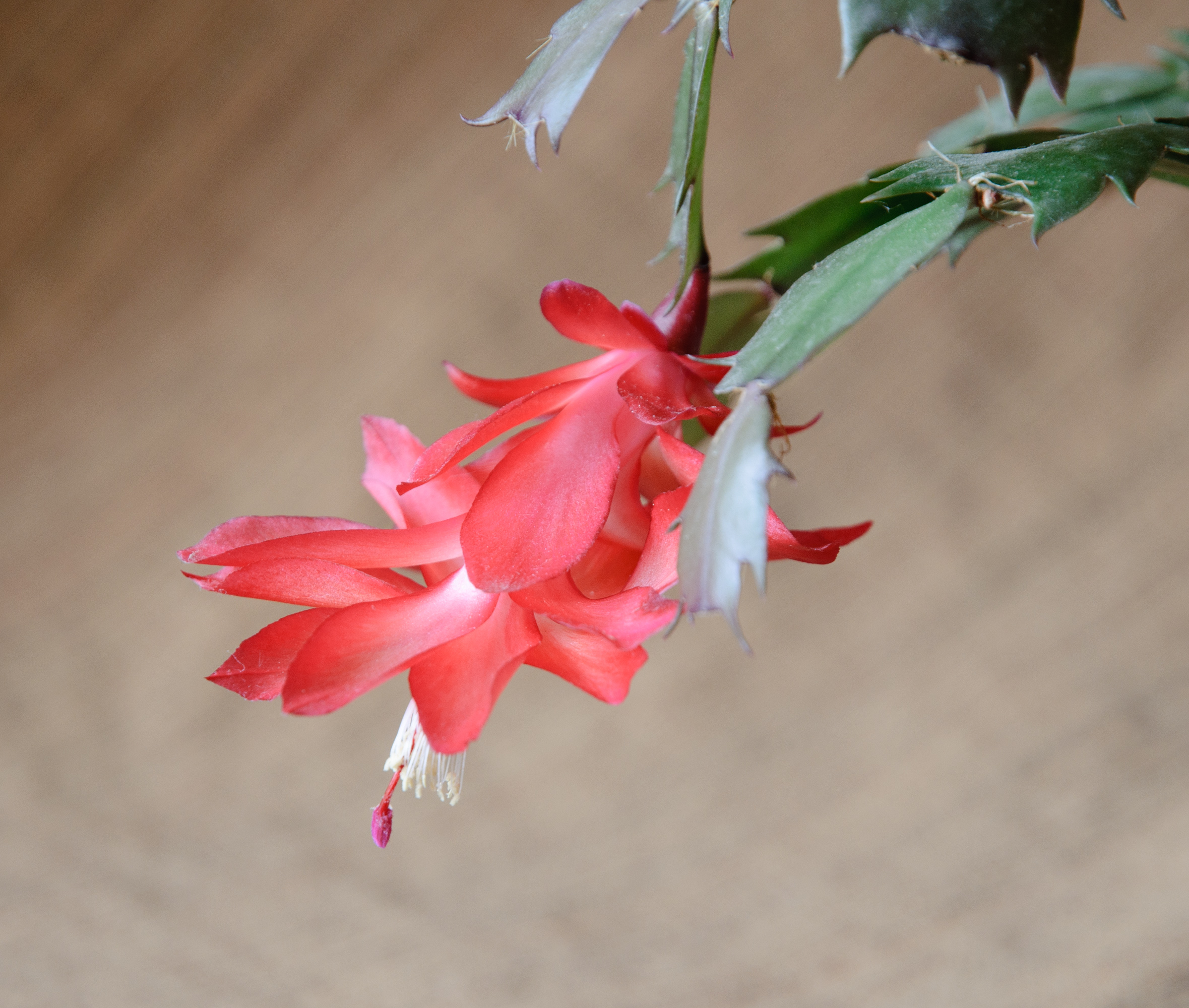
Christmas Cactus flower

=== Christmas rose ===
One plant called Christmas rose is regarded as a true Christmas flower in certain parts of the world. Christmas rose (Serissa) is also known as the "snow rose" or "winter rose". Originally from tropical regions of Asia, cultivated Serissa often blooms during the winter. On the occasion of Christmas Eve, it is traditional for young women in North America to exchange specially designed Christmas roses resembling their spirit of fraternity.

Another plant known as Christmas rose is Helleborus niger.

== Europe ==
=== Holly ===
Holly is the plant most associated with Christmas in many European countries. Holly wreaths are hung on doors, and sprigs of holly are used to trim Christmas puddings.

=== Ivy ===
Like most of the other Christmas flowers, ivy leaves symbolize eternity and resurrection. The ivy leaf has been associated with the ancient Egyptian god Osiris and the Greco-Roman god Attis, both of whom were resurrected from the dead.

=== Mistletoe ===
Mistletoe is a Christmas plant whose origin is said to date back to the Pagans. Druid priests used this Christmas plant two hundred years before the birth of Christ in their winter celebrations. A more modern tradition is to exchange kisses under a sprig of mistletoe.

== New Zealand ==
In New Zealand, the pohutukawa tree is often associated with Christmas, as its bright red flowers usually appear in December.
