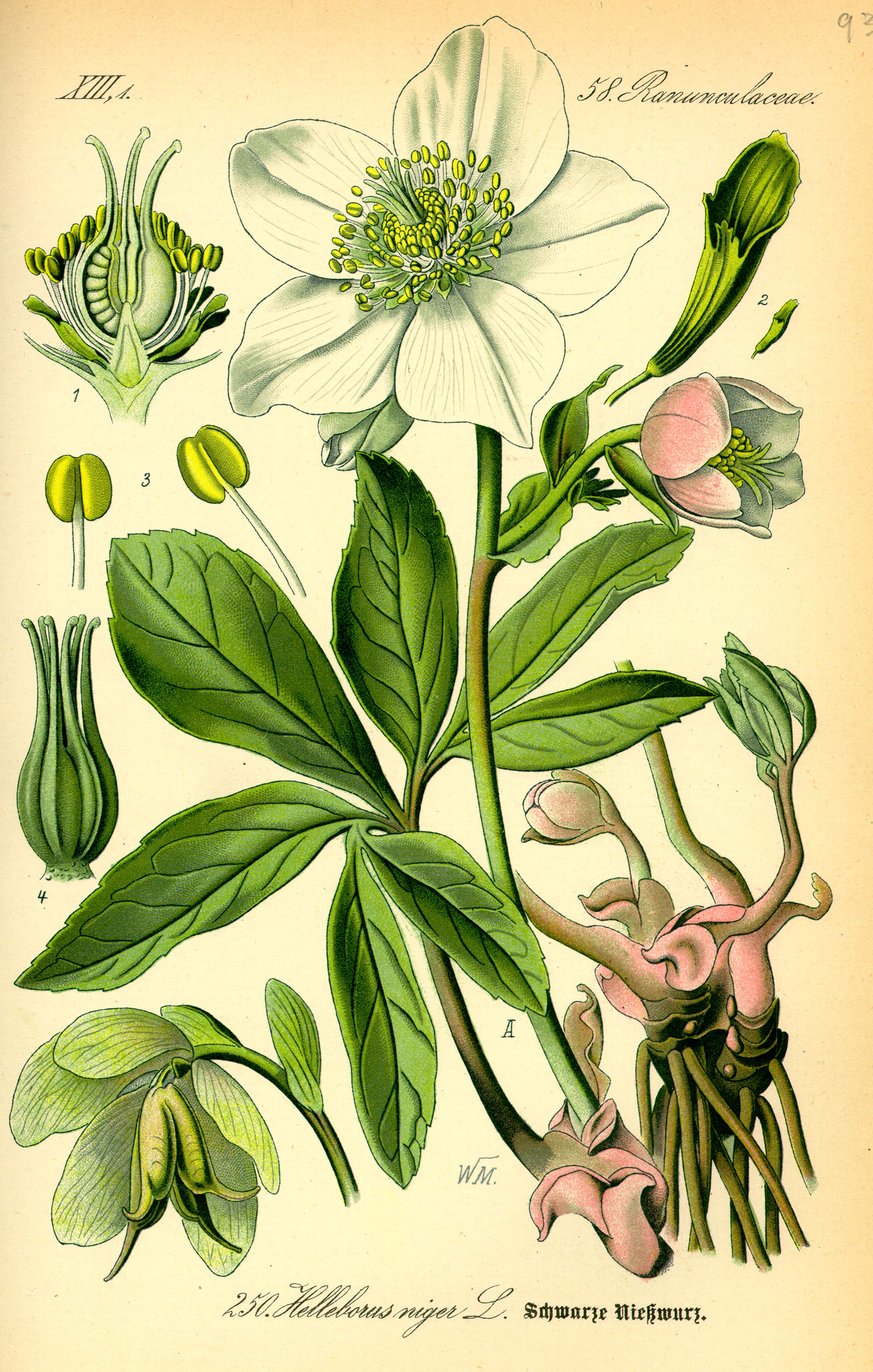
- 19th c. illustration of Helleborus niger, by Otto Wilhelm Thomé

Scientific classification
- Kingdom: Plantae
- Clade: Tracheophytes
- Clade: Angiosperms
- Clade: Eudicots
- Order: Ranunculales
- Family: Ranunculaceae
- Subfamily: Ranunculoideae
- Tribe: Helleboreae; DC.
- Genus: Helleborus; L.

Species
- See text

= Hellebore =

Genus of plants

Commonly known as hellebores (/ˈhɛləbɔːrz/), the Eurasian genus Helleborus consists of approximately 20 species of herbaceous or evergreen perennial flowering plants in the family Ranunculaceae, within which it gave its name to the tribe of Helleboreae. Many hellebore species are poisonous.

Despite common names such as winter rose, Christmas rose, and Lenten rose, hellebores are not closely related to the rose family (Rosaceae).

== Etymology ==
The common name "hellebore" is first attested in 1300s; it originates, via Old French and Latin, ultimately from Ancient Greek: ἑλλέβορος, romanized: helléboros. Although traditionally translated as "plant eaten by fawns", this could be folk etymology and, according to Beekes, really a Pre-Greek word. It is not related to the word "hell", despite the toxic nature of this plant.

In Anglo-Saxon England, the Anglo-Latin word elleborus had varied meanings. Around 900 AD, it was linked with "tunsingwyrt" (various spellings; likely an Allium species) in the Old English Herbarium. Ælfric of Eynsham seemed to assert that elleborus had no vernacular Old English translation; by the early 11th century, "wodewistle" was used to gloss the word, possibly referring to hemlock or similar. These shifts reflect the developing understanding of Latin plant names in Old English texts.

== Description ==
The flowers have five petal-like sepals surrounding a ring of small, cup-like nectaries which are actually petals modified to hold nectar. The sepals do not fall as petals would, but remain on the plant, sometimes for many months. The persistence of the sepals may contribute to the development of the seeds.

== Taxonomy ==
The genus was established by Carl Linnaeus in volume one of his Species Plantarum in 1753.

The scientific name Helleborus could derive from the Ancient Greek word ἑλλέβορος (helléboros), the common name for H. orientalis, constructed from ἑλεῖν (heleîn, "to injure") and βορά (borá), "food.".

=== Species and subspecies ===
Twenty-two species are recognised and divided into six sections. The table below shows the species of the genus Helleborus, give its common name, the area of distribution, an image if available and the meaning of the scientific name. The cladogram shows the relationship between the different species determined with microbiological methods by Meiners et al. (2011).

Name	Common name	meaning of the scientific name	Distribution area	Color of the flower	Image
Subgenus Helleborus					
I. sect. Griphopus Spach em. Schiffner		gryphon + foot			
Helleborus foetidus L. 1753	stinking hellebore or setterwort	stinking	SW – M Europe	green, commonly red rim	
II. sect. Chenopus Schiffner		goose + foot			
Helleborus lividus Aiton; 1789		lead colored, bluish	Majorca	green	
Helleborus argutifolius Viv. 1824	Corsican hellebore often H. lividus Aiton subsp. corsicus (BRIQ.) P. FOURN.	sharp-leafed	Corsica, Sardinia	green, white	
III. sect. Helleborus [sect. Chionorhodon Spach]		snow, rose			
Helleborus niger L. 1753	Christmas rose or black hellebore	black	Croatia, Slovenia, N Italy, Switzerland, Austria, S Germany	white, later pink	
subsp. macranthus				white, later pink	
subsp. niger L.				white, later pink	
Subgenus Helleborastrum (Spach)					
IV. sect. Syncarpus Schiffer		with/together + flower (3 flowers fused together)			
Helleborus vesicarius Aucher ex Boiss. 1841			SE Turkey, NW Syria	red	
V. sect. Dicarpon Ulbrich		two + flower (2 flowers fused together)			
Helleborus thibetanus Franch. 1885			China	pink	
VI. sect. Helleborastrum Spach		hellebore + resembling			
Helleborus abruzzicus M.Thomsen, McLewin & B.Mathew		Abruzzo	middle Italy	whitish, greenish	
Helleborus atrorubens Waldst. & Kit. 1812		dark, red	Slovenia, N Croatia, Bosnia, former Yugoslavia	reddish, purple	
Helleborus bocconei Ten. 1823		Botanist Paolo Boccone	S Italy, Sicily	white	
Helleborus croaticus Martinis 1973		from Croatia	NE Croatia	reddish violet	
Helleborus cyclophyllus (A.Braun) Boiss. 1867		Circle, leafs	Greece, Macedonia, Albania, Bulgaria	green, light green, whitish	
Helleborus dumetorum Waldst. & Kit. ex Willd. 1809			Slovenia, Hungary, Croatia, Romania, Austria,	green to white	
Helleborus liguricus M.Thomsen, McLewin & B.Mathew		from Liguria	Italy (Ligura, Tuscany)	green to white	
Helleborus multifidus Vis.		multiple segmented	Croatia, Herzegovina	green	
subsp. hercegovinus		from Herzegovina	Montenegro, Hercegovina	yellow-green	
subsp. istriacus		from Istria	NE Italy, Croatia, Bosnia, Montenegro	green	
subsp. multifidus		multiple segmented	Albania and former Yugoslavia		
Helleborus odorus Waldst. & Kit. ex Willd. 1809		odorant	S- and SE Europe with focus at the Balkans	green bis yellowish-green	
subsp. odorus L.		odorant			
Helleborus orientalis Lam. 1789	Lenten rose, Lenten hellebore, oriental hellebore	from the east	N Turkey, Bulgaria, Ukraine, Georgia, Caucasus	white, yellowish, pink	
subsp. abchasicus (A. Braun) Mathew		from Abkhazia	Georgia	pink, reddish	
subsp. guttatus (A. Braun & Sauer) Mathew		dotted			
subsp. orientalis	H. caucasicus, H. kochii, occasionally used for ssp. gutatus + abchasicus	from the east		reddish	
Helleborus purpurascens Waldst. & Kit. 1802		purple / red	Hungary, Slovakia, Poland, Romania	violet, brown	
Helleborus torquatus Archer-Hind 1884		adorned with a necklet	Croatia, Bosnia, Serbia, Montenegro	green, violet	
Helleborus viridis L. 1753	green hellebore or bear's-foot	green	Austria, N Italy, Switzerland, S Germany	green	
subsp. occidentalis 1869		from the west	N Spain, SW France (Naturalised in France, Germany, Great Britain)	green	

- Subgenus Helleborus
  - - sec. Griphopus
      H. foetidus
    - - sec. Helleborus
        H. niger
      - sec. Chenopus
        - H. argutifolius
        - H. lividus
- Subgenus Helleborastrum
  - sec. Syncarpus
    H. vesicarius
  - - sec. Dicarpon
      H. thibetanus
    - sec. helleboastrum
      - - H. dumetorum
        - H. purpurascens
      - - - - H. croaticus
            - - - - H. multifidus
                  - H. abruzzicus
                - - H. hercegovinus
                  - H. liguricus
          - - - - H. atrorubens
                - H. viridis
              - - - - H. cyclophyllus
                    - H. torquatus
                  - H. orientalis
                - H. odorus

Cladogram of evolutionary lines in Helleborus from Meiners et al.(2011)

==== Caulescent species ====
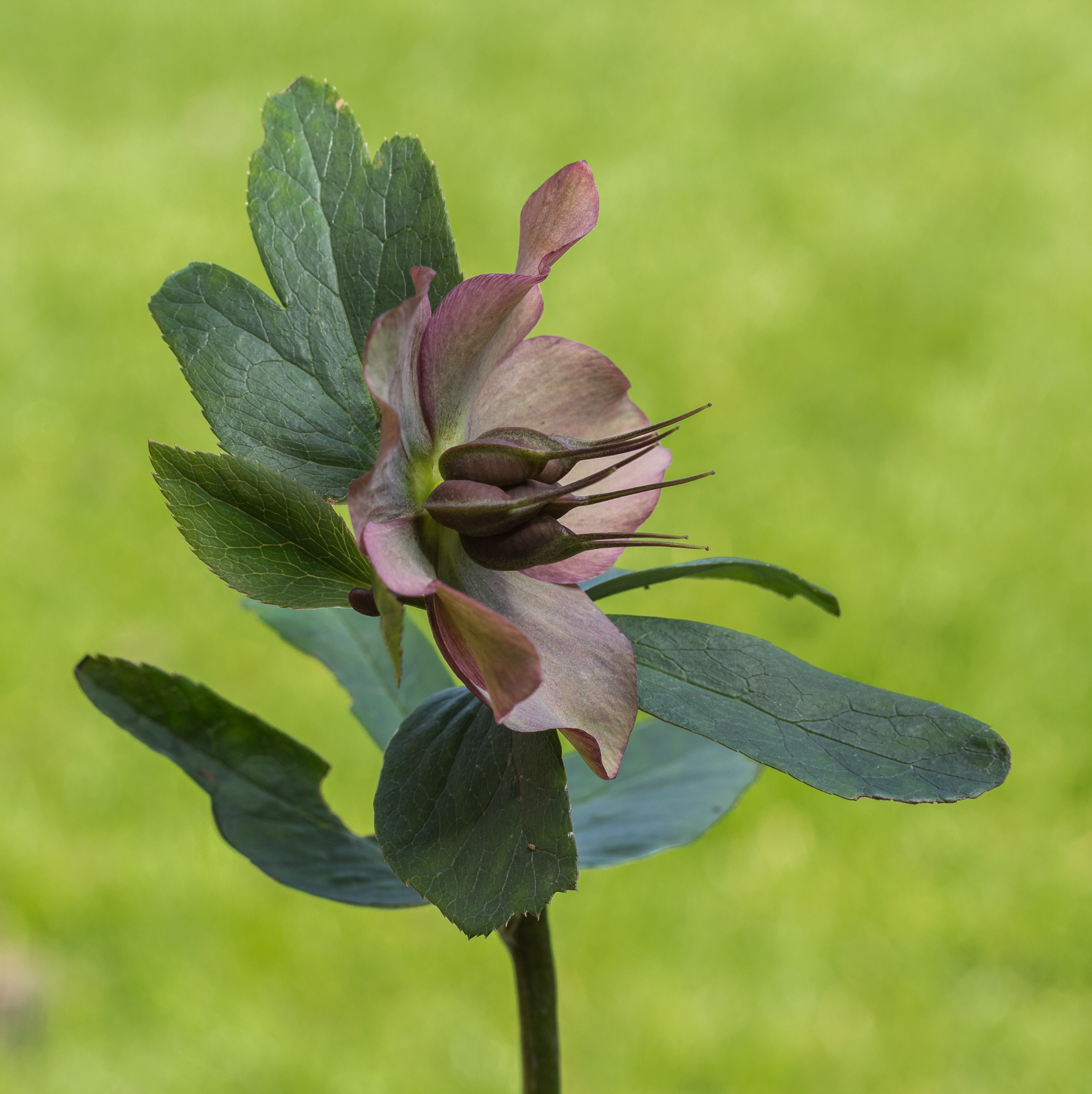
Swelling seed pods, Helleborus orientalis

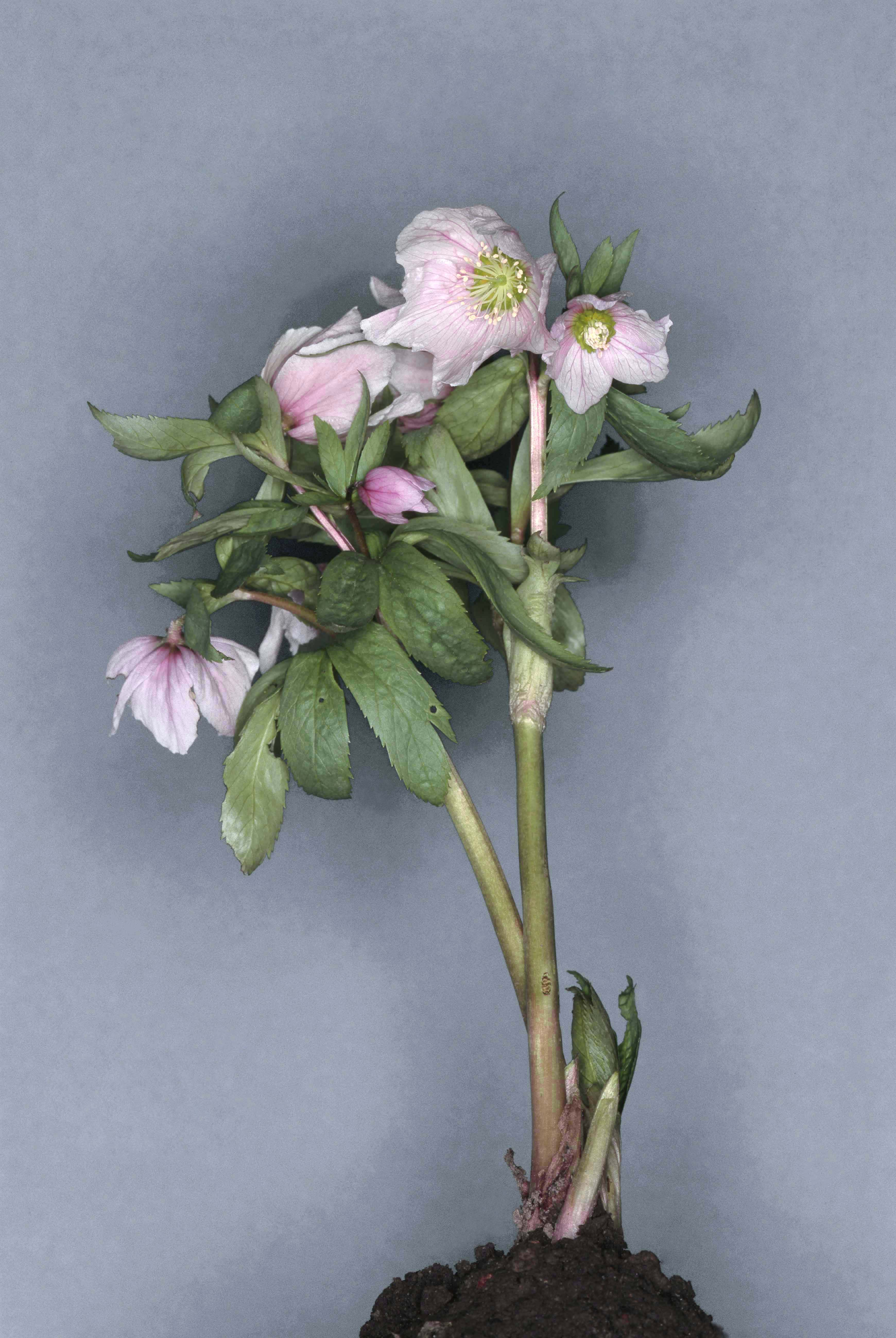
Helleborus thibetanus

These four species have leaves on their flowering stems (in H. vesicarius the stems die back each year; it also has basal leaves).

- Helleborus argutifolius – Corsican hellebore
- Helleborus foetidus – stinking hellebore or setterwort
- Helleborus lividus
- Helleborus vesicarius

==== Acaulescent (stemless) species ====
These species have basal leaves. They have no true leaves on their flower stalks (although there are leafy bracts where the flower stalks branch).

- Helleborus atrorubens
- Helleborus croaticus
- Helleborus cyclophyllus
- Helleborus dumetorum
- Helleborus abruzzicus
- Helleborus liguricus
- Helleborus bocconei
- Helleborus multifidus
  - Helleborus multifidus subsp. hercegovinus
  - Helleborus multifidus subsp. istriacus
  - Helleborus multifidus subsp. multifidus
- Helleborus niger – Christmas rose or black hellebore
  - Helleborus niger subsp. macranthus (syn. H. niger major)
  - Helleborus niger subsp. niger
- Helleborus odorus
  - Helleborus odorus subsp. laxus
  - Helleborus odorus subsp. odorus
- Helleborus orientalis – Lenten rose, Lenten hellebore, oriental hellebore (N.B. most of the Lenten hellebores in gardens are now considered to be H. × hybridus)
  - Helleborus orientalis subsp. abchasicus (syn. H. abchasicus)
  - Helleborus orientalis subsp. guttatus
  - Helleborus orientalis subsp. orientalis (syn. H. caucasicus, H. kochii)
- Helleborus purpurascens
- Helleborus thibetanus (syn. H. chinensis)
- Helleborus torquatus
- Helleborus viridis - green hellebore or bear's-foot
- Helleborus occidentalis (formerly H. viridis subsp. occidentalis)

Other species names (now considered invalid) may be encountered in older literature, including H. hyemalis, H. polychromus, H. ranunculinus, H. trifolius.

==== Hellebore hybrids ====
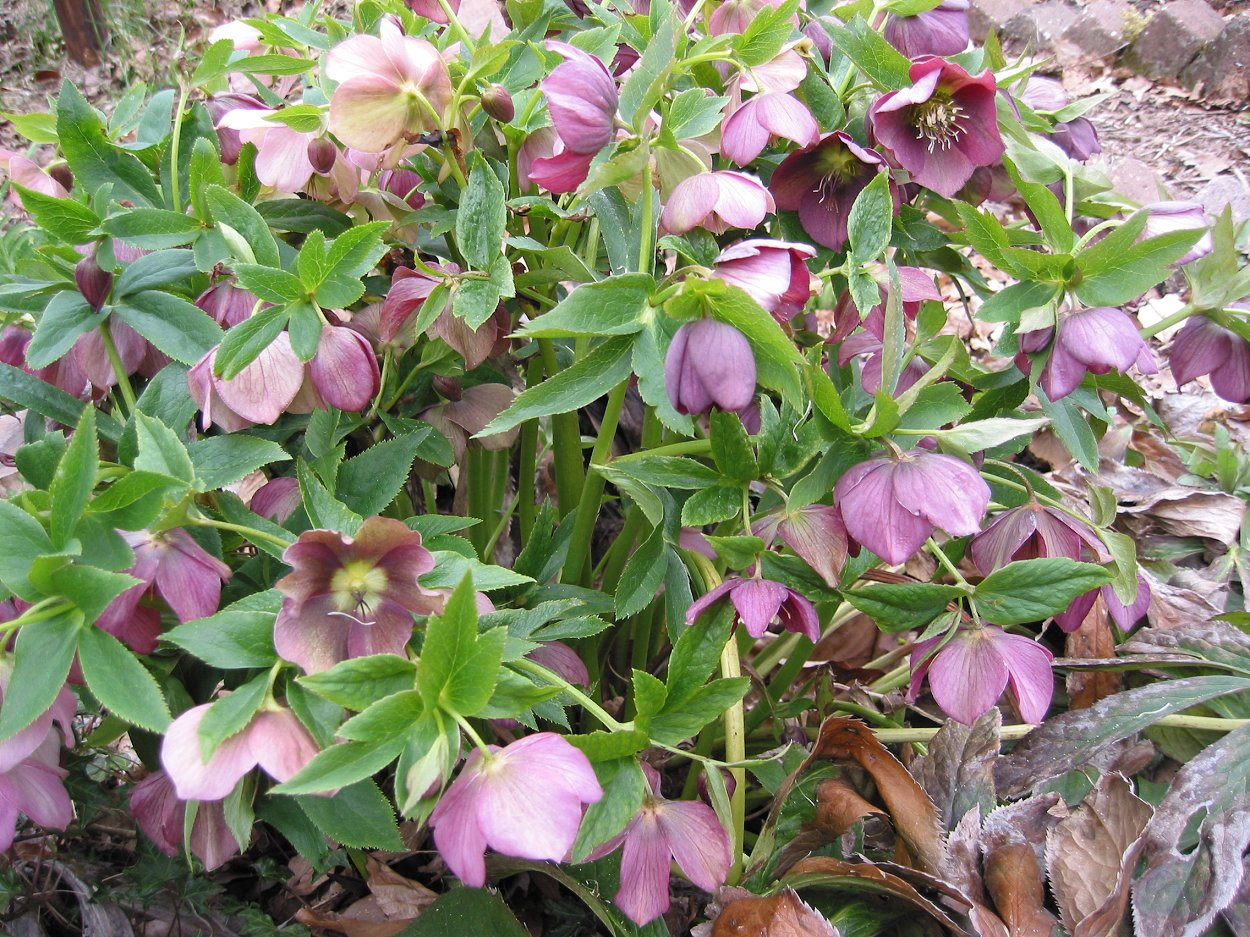
H. × hybridus in a garden

Hybridising (deliberate and accidental) between H. orientalis and several other closely related species and subspecies has vastly improved the colour-range of the flowers, which now extends from slate grey, near-black, deep purple and plum, through rich red and pinks to yellow, white and green. The outer surface of the sepals is often green-tinged, and as the flower ages it usually becomes greener inside and out; individual flowers often remain on the plant for a month or more. The inner surface of each sepal may be marked with veins, or dotted or blotched with pink, red or purple. "Picotee" flowers, whose pale-coloured sepals have narrow margins of a darker colour, are much sought-after, as are those with dark nectaries which contrast with the outer sepals.

Recent breeding programmes have also created double-flowered and anemone-centred plants. Ironically, doing this is actually reversing the evolutionary process in which hellebores' true petals had been modified into nectaries; it is usually these nectaries which become the extra petals in double, semi-double and anemone-centred flowers. Double-flowered hellebores provide a very interesting variation to the standard hellebore. They are generally easy to maintain and share the same planting conditions as the standard hellebore.

Semi-double flowers have one or two extra rows of petals; doubles have more. Their inner petals are generally very like the outer ones in colour and patterning. They are often of a similar length and shape, though they may be slightly shorter and narrower, and some are attractively waved or ruffled. By contrast, anemone-centred flowers have, cupped within the five normal outer petals, a ring of much shorter, more curved extra petals (sometimes trumpet-shaped, intermediate in appearance between petals and nectaries), which may be a different colour from the outer petals. These short, extra petals (sometimes known as "petaloids") drop off after the flower has been pollinated, leaving an apparently single flower, whereas doubles and semi-doubles tend to retain their extra petals after pollination.

==== Interspecific hybrids ====
Gardeners and nurserymen have also created hybrids between less closely related species. The earliest was probably H. × nigercors, a cross between H. niger and H. argutifolius (formerly H. lividus subsp. corsicus or H. corsicus, hence the name) first made in 1931. H. × sternii, a cross between H. argutifolius and H. lividus, first exhibited in 1947, is named after the celebrated British plantsman Sir Frederick Stern. H. × ballardiae (H. niger crossed with H. lividus) and H. × ericsmithii (H. niger crossed with H. × sternii) similarly commemorate the noted British nursery owners Helen Ballard and Eric Smith. In recent years, Ashwood Nurseries (of Kingswinford in the English Midlands) has created hybrids between H. niger and H. thibetanus (called H. 'Pink Ice'), and between H. niger and H. vesicarius (called H. 'Briar Rose'). The gardenworthiness of these hybrids has still to be proven.

The following hellebore species and cultivars have gained the Royal Horticultural Society's Award of Garden Merit:

- H. argutifolius
- H. foetidus
- H. lividus
- H. niger
- H. × sternii 'Blackthorn Group'
- H. Walberton's Rosemary 'Walhero'(PBR) (sometimes listed under H. × hybridus)

== Distribution ==
Various species of this genus originated in Europe and Asia. The greatest concentration of species occurs in the Balkans. One atypical species (H. thibetanus) comes from western China; another atypical species (H. vesicarius) inhabits a small area on the border between Turkey and Syria.

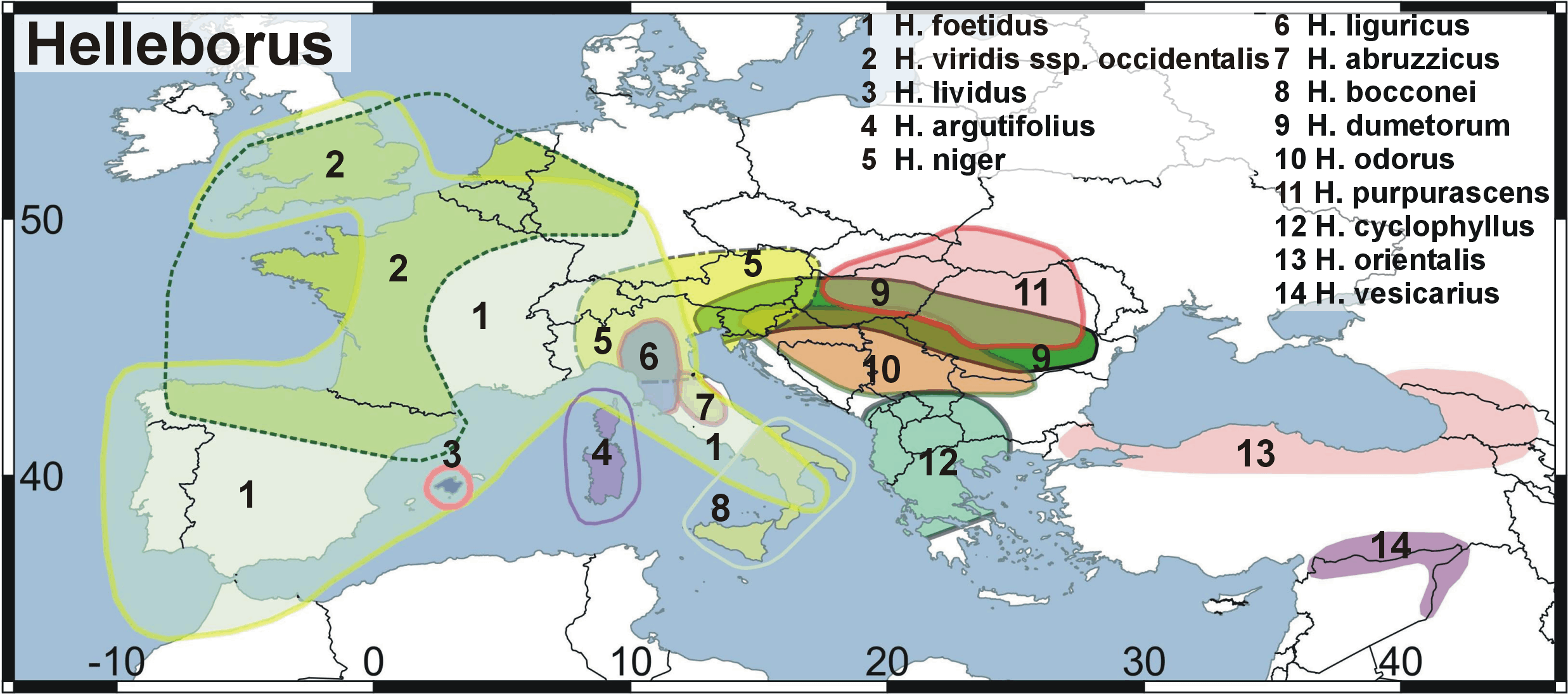
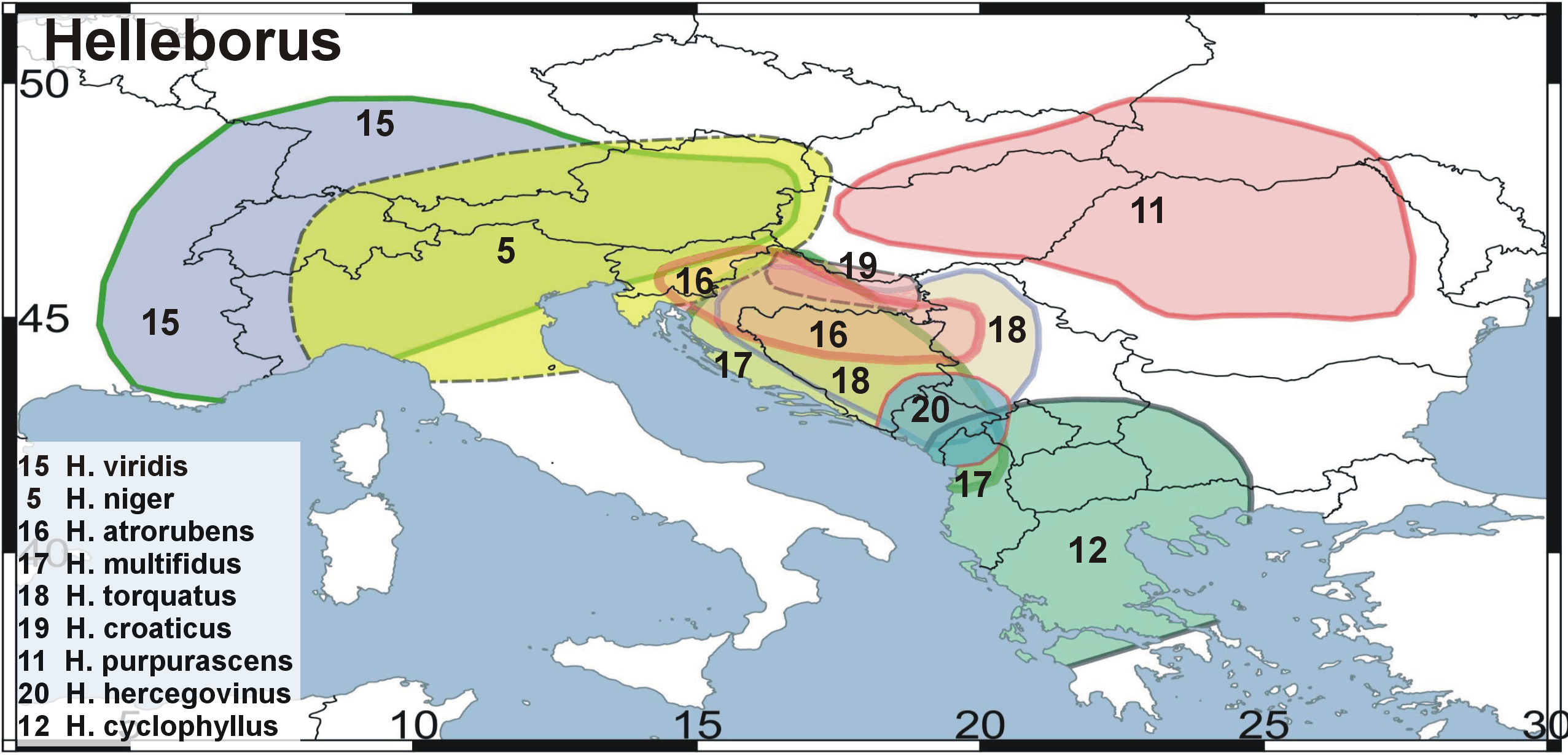
Distribution maps of 19 species of Helleborus in Europe and Asia (left) and in southeast Europe (right)

== Pests and diseases ==
=== Insects ===
==== Phytomyza hellebori ====
More commonly known as the Hellebore leaf miner, Phytomyza hellebori is a small fly that infests only the H. foetidus plants in the Hellebore genus. The leaf miner fly digs tunnels into the leaves of the H. foetidus. The tunnels create brownish-black blotches on the plant. These later turn into a nesting ground where the flies lay their eggs. With time, the leaves turn a brownish-white along where the tunnels were dug. The larvae start to eat the inside of the leaves in August, and damage develops from the late summer to the early spring, with heavy attacks leaving the foliage disfigured by spring.

To control heavy infestations, the leaves can be removed and destroyed during the winter months before the adult flies emerge. Insecticides can be used with limited effectiveness in controlling larvae and fly populations in the plant. Insecticides may harm non-leaf miner flies if applied during the hellebore's flowering period.

==== Macrosiphum hellebori ====
Macrosiphum hellebori, commonly known as 'Hellebore aphid' or 'greenfly', is a sap-feeding aphid that infests the flowers and foliage of hellebore plants. The whitish-green aphids are about 2–4 millimetres (3/32–5/32 inch) long and form dense colonies on hellebores, coating them with a honeydew that can lead to the growth of sooty mold on the leaves and flowers of the hellebore. This species of aphid only affects hellebores and is most active in March and April when the hellebores are flowering and when few aphid predators are around, though they may infest during any time of the year.

Aphids start their feeding from the outside the flowers, beginning at the leaves and then moving towards the flower petals of the hellebore. As the hellebore begins to open, the aphids try to move into the flower. The aphids then feed on the inner parts of the plant as well as the young stems and shoots. As the population grows, the aphids eventually eat the remaining parts of the plant, such as older leaves, for food.

Aphid infestations can be controlled through persistent squashing of the aphids manually or by using insecticides. It is not recommended to spray flowering hellebores as it may harm the non-aphid pollinating insects.

=== Diseases ===
==== Botrytis cinerea ====
Botrytis cinerea or grey mold is a fungal disease that infects most ornamental plants. The fungus causes a decay of plant tissues and grows fuzzy gray-brown mold over the decaying areas, such as the buds, leaves, and flowers. Parts of the plant may shrivel and die after exposure to the mold, particularly the flowers. Typically the fungus infects plants only through an open wound or when the plant is under stress, but it has also been known to infect plants in humid conditions. If the humidity is low, the mold may be contained to discrete spots on the plant, but the mold has been known to spread rapidly in highly humid conditions. Grey mold is not seasonally dependent and can infect a plant at any time of the year. The fungus forms black seed-like structures in the dead plant tissue to create its spores to help it survive when new host plants are scarce. The spores are spread through the air to new plants.

To treat the infected plant, the first step is to remove infected and dying leaves, buds, and flowers immediately along with any other dead plant materials around the hellebore. The next step is to reduce the humidity around the plant by improving the ventilation and ensuring the plants are not overcrowded.

==== Coniothyrium hellebori ====
Coniothyrium hellebori is a fungus that causes the most common fungal disease for helleborus species known as Hellebore black spot or leaf spot. The disease is most common not only in botanical and ornamental gardens but also in hellebore nurseries as well. Visible symptoms include blackish-brown spots that often appear as rings on the leaf blade or at the margins of the leaf. The spots continue to grow larger as the disease progresses, retaining an elliptical or circular shape and turning a dark brown or black color. The spots grow until they infect the whole leaf. Petioles and flowers can also be infected, but the disease is primarily seen in the leaves. The symptoms become visible in the spring and worsen with time.

The small black fruiting bodies which carry the spores, pycnidia, are formed in the dead cells of the leaf spots. The spores are mainly spread by water, wind, and wind-blown rain. The fungus has an ideal habitat to spread and grow at the final growth site for hellebore plants, and if left untreated, the spores remain for many years. The most effective method against C. hellebori is to remove and destroy the infected leaves immediately to avoid reinfection the following spring.

==== Helleborus net necrosis virus ====
Helleborus net necrosis virus (HeNNV), also known as Hellebore black death, is an RNA virus that can cause serious disease in Hellebore plants by stunting or deforming the plant as it grows. The disease marks the leaves of the hellebores with black streaks, often following the veins of the leaf, and creating ring patterns. It can also mark the sepals and flowers with black spots or streaks but does not always do so. When symptoms are severe, new leaves have limited growth before dying off. The most seriously affected in the UK is H. orientalis, but all hellebores are susceptible to the disease. The most effective method of treatment against black death is to dig up and destroy all infected plants immediately. Many viruses are not transmitted through seeds, so it is possible to raise new disease resistant plants this way.

==== Pseudomonas viridiflava ====
Pseudomonas viridiflava is a bacterium that has been claimed to cause disease in hellebores in New Zealand, among other plants. The bacterial disease manifested on hellebore plants in the form of black leaf spots, necrosis petal, and stem lesions. The most popular ornamental and commercial crop grown in New Zealand is H. orientalis and its hybrids, of which 90 percent of the H. orientalis in the Tauranga nursery contracted the disease after several days of moderate rainfall. The disease caused discoloration in the form of black leaf spots that were circular and about 1.5–2 mm in diameter, black stem lesions, and dry, grey to brown lesions with distinct margins on the flower petals. The symptoms were different from other leaf-spotting hellebore diseases, such as those caused by the fungus Coniothyrium and the bacteria Xanthomonas The case in New Zealand is the only reported case of P. viridiflava infecting hellebores so far, but in other plants P. viridiflava has been reported to also induce symptoms such as leaf rot, leaf blotch, stem necrosis and blossom blight.

== Horticulture ==
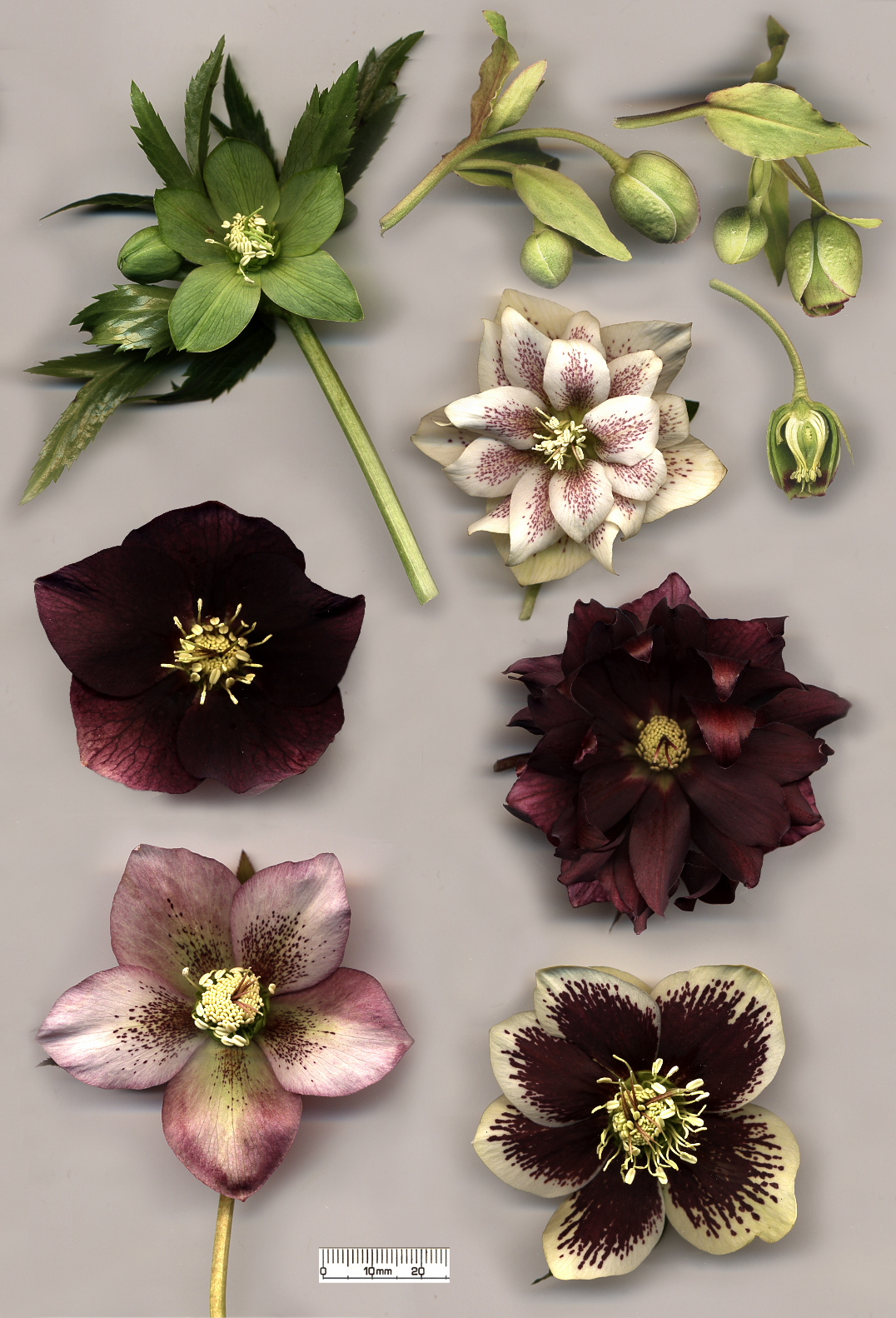
Hellebore species and hybrids: Helleborus viridis (top left); H. foetidus (top right) with cross-section; flowers of various specimens of H. × hybridus, including doubles

Hellebores are widely grown in United States Department of Agriculture hardiness zones 5a to 8b gardens for decorative purposes. They are particularly valued by gardeners for their winter and early spring flowering period; the plants are surprisingly frost-resistant and many are evergreen. Also of value is their shade tolerance. Many species of hellebore have green or greenish-purple flowers and are of limited garden value, although Corsican hellebore (H. argutifolius), a robust plant with pale green, cup-shaped flowers and attractive leathery foliage, is widely grown. So is the 'stinking hellebore' or setterwort (H. foetidus), which has drooping clusters of small, pale green, bell-shaped flowers, often edged with maroon, which contrasts with its dark evergreen foliage. H. foetidus 'Wester Flisk', with red-flushed flowers and flower stalks, is becoming popular, as are more recent selections with golden-yellow foliage.

The so-called Christmas rose (H. niger), a traditional cottage garden favourite, bears its pure white flowers (which often age to pink) in the depths of winter; large-flowered cultivars are available, as are pink-flowered and double-flowered selections.

The most popular hellebores for garden use are H. orientalis and its colourful hybrids, H. × hybridus (Lenten rose). In the northern hemisphere, they flower in early spring, around the period of Lent, and are often known as Lenten hellebores, oriental hellebores, or Lenten roses. They are excellent for bringing early colour to shady herbaceous borders and areas between deciduous shrubs and under trees.

== Toxicity ==
All helleborus plants are toxic, and all parts of the helleborus plant are toxic. Hellebore poisoning is rare, but it does occur.

Hellebore plants are usually left alone by animals such as deer and rabbits because the leaves of the plant produce various toxins, making them distasteful to animals. The leaves have been known to sometimes bother gardeners with sensitive skin. It was used in the First Sacred War at the start of the sixth century BC to poison the water supply of the city of Kirrha.

Poisonings occur through ingestion or handling. Hellebore plants should not be ingested as poisoning cases are most severe when the plants are eaten. This is especially true when hellebores are eaten in large quantities. Symptoms of ingestion include: burning of the mouth and throat, salivation, vomiting, abdominal cramping, diarrhea, nervous symptoms, and possibly depression. Consuming large quantities of hellebore plants can be fatal. Toxic steroids occur in the roots. High levels of ranunculin and protoanemonin, especially in the leaves and sap, also contribute to symptoms after ingestion.

Dermatitis may also occur from handling the hellebore plants without protection. This is caused by the ranunculin and protoanemonin found within the plant's leaves, stems, flowers, and sap. When collecting seeds from hellebore plants, it is recommended to wait for the pods to dry and shake them out into a container or onto the ground to collect. Attempts to remove the seeds by hand could potentially cause chemical burns. Small or minimal exposure to the toxins should only cause a mild irritation to the skin, and the affliction should only last for a few minutes. If the burning persists or intensifies, it is recommended to wash the affected areas thoroughly to remove the toxins and see a doctor.

The species historically known as "black hellebore" (Helleborus niger) causes tinnitus, vertigo, stupor, thirst, anaphylaxis, emesis (vomiting), catharsis, bradycardia (slowing of the heart rate), and finally, collapse and death from cardiac arrest. Although black hellebore contains protoanemonin and ranunculin, which has an acrid taste and can cause burning of the eyes, mouth, and throat, oral ulceration, gastroenteritis, and hematemesis, research in the 1970s showed that the roots of H. niger do not contain the cardiac glycosides helleborin, hellebrin, and helleborein that are responsible for the lethal reputation of "black hellebore". It seems that earlier studies may have used a commercial preparation containing a mixture of material from other species such as Helleborus viridis, green hellebore.

== Uses ==
In the early days of medicine, two kinds of hellebore were recognized: black hellebore, which included various species of Helleborus, and white hellebore, now known as Veratrum album, which belongs to a different plant family, the Melanthiaceae. Although the latter plant contains highly toxic, teratogenic alkaloids such as veratrine, cyclopamine, and jervine, it is believed to be the "hellebore" used by Hippocrates as a purgative.

Despite serious risks, "black hellebore" was used by the Greeks and Romans to treat paralysis, gout and psychosis.

== Culture ==
H. niger is commonly called the Christmas rose, due to an old legend that it sprouted in the snow from the tears of a young girl who had no gift to give the Christ Child in Bethlehem.

In Greek mythology, Melampus of Pylos used hellebore to save the daughters of the king of Argos from a madness, induced by Dionysus, that caused them to run naked through the city, crying, weeping, and screaming.

During the Siege of Kirrha in 585 BC, hellebore was reportedly used by the Greek besiegers to poison the city's water supply. The defenders were subsequently so weakened by diarrhea that they were unable to defend the city from assault.

In a fit of madness induced by Hera, Heracles killed his children. His madness was cured using hellebore.

== Gallery ==
=== Species ===
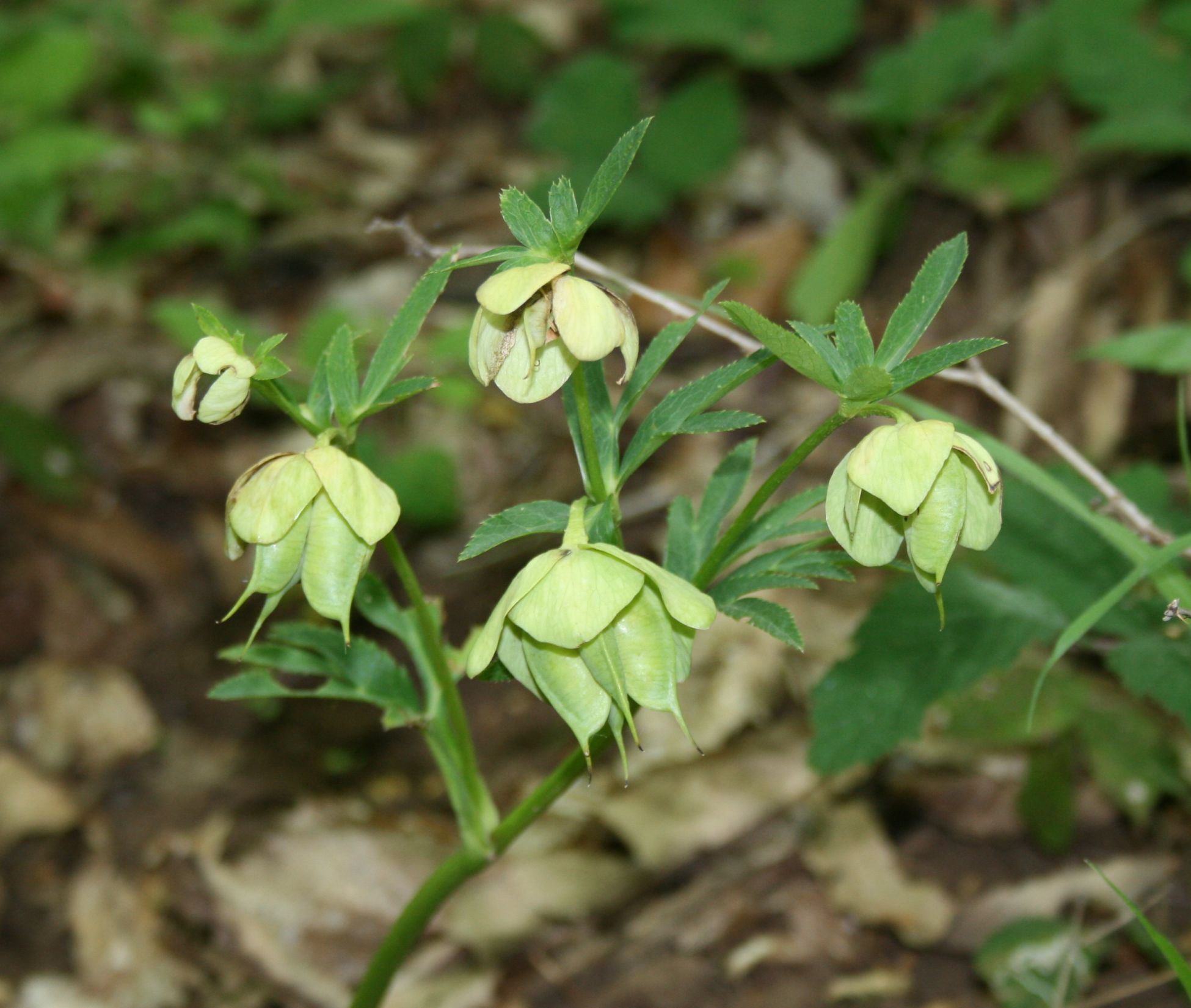
Helleborus bocconei

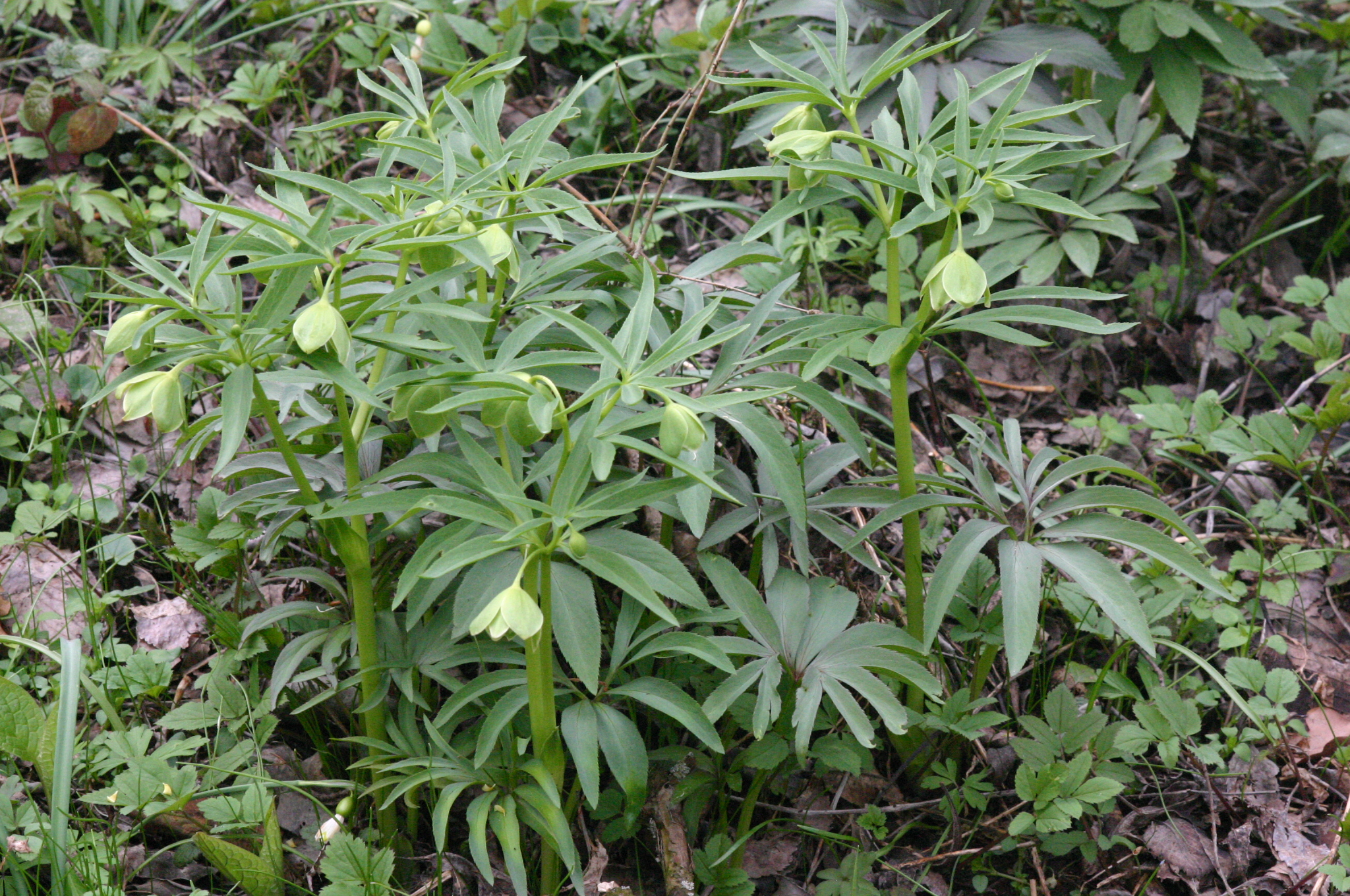
H. dumetorum (Hecken-Nieswurz)

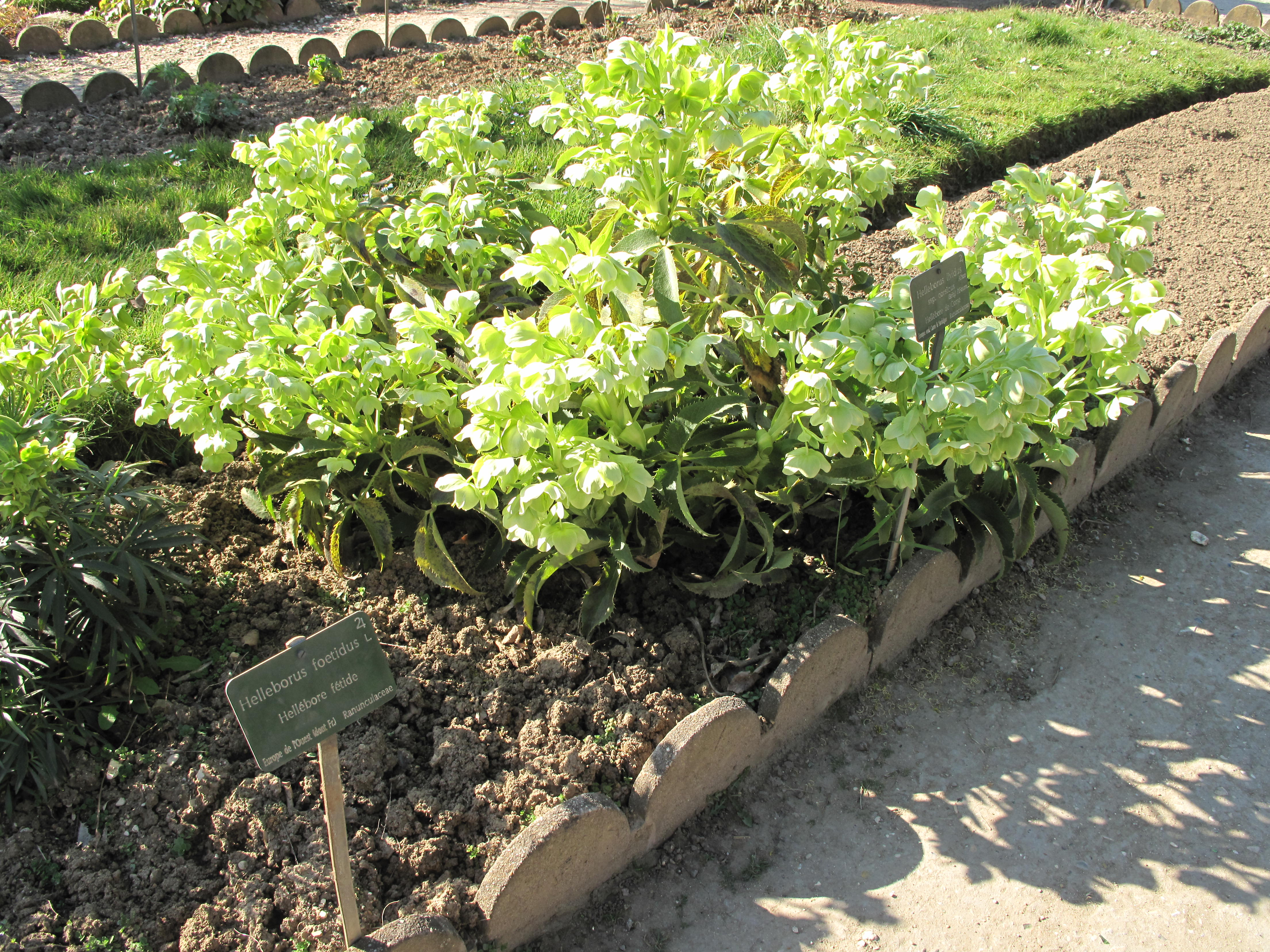
Helleborus lividus ssp. corsicus (Jardin des Plantes de Paris)

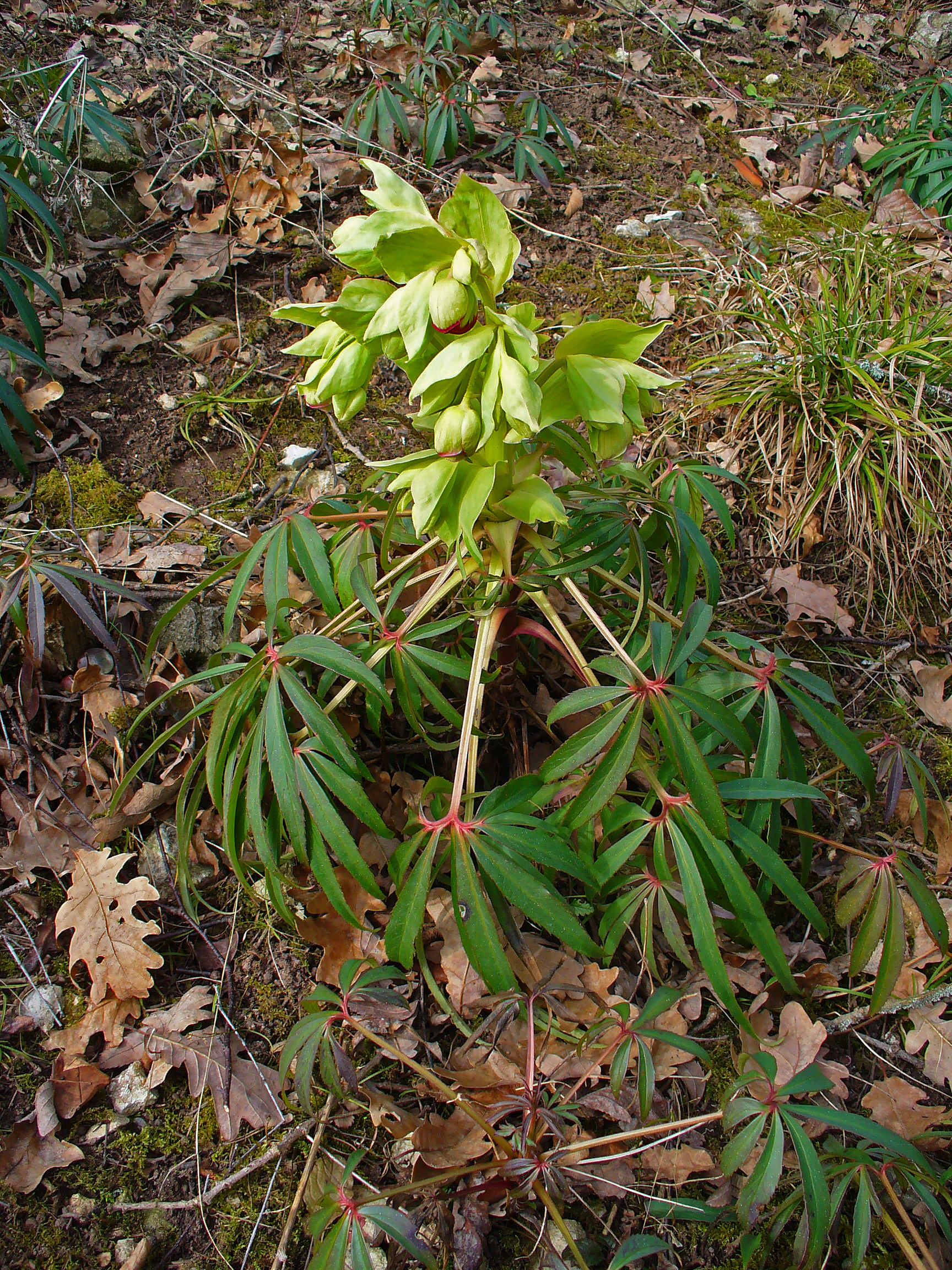
H. foetidus

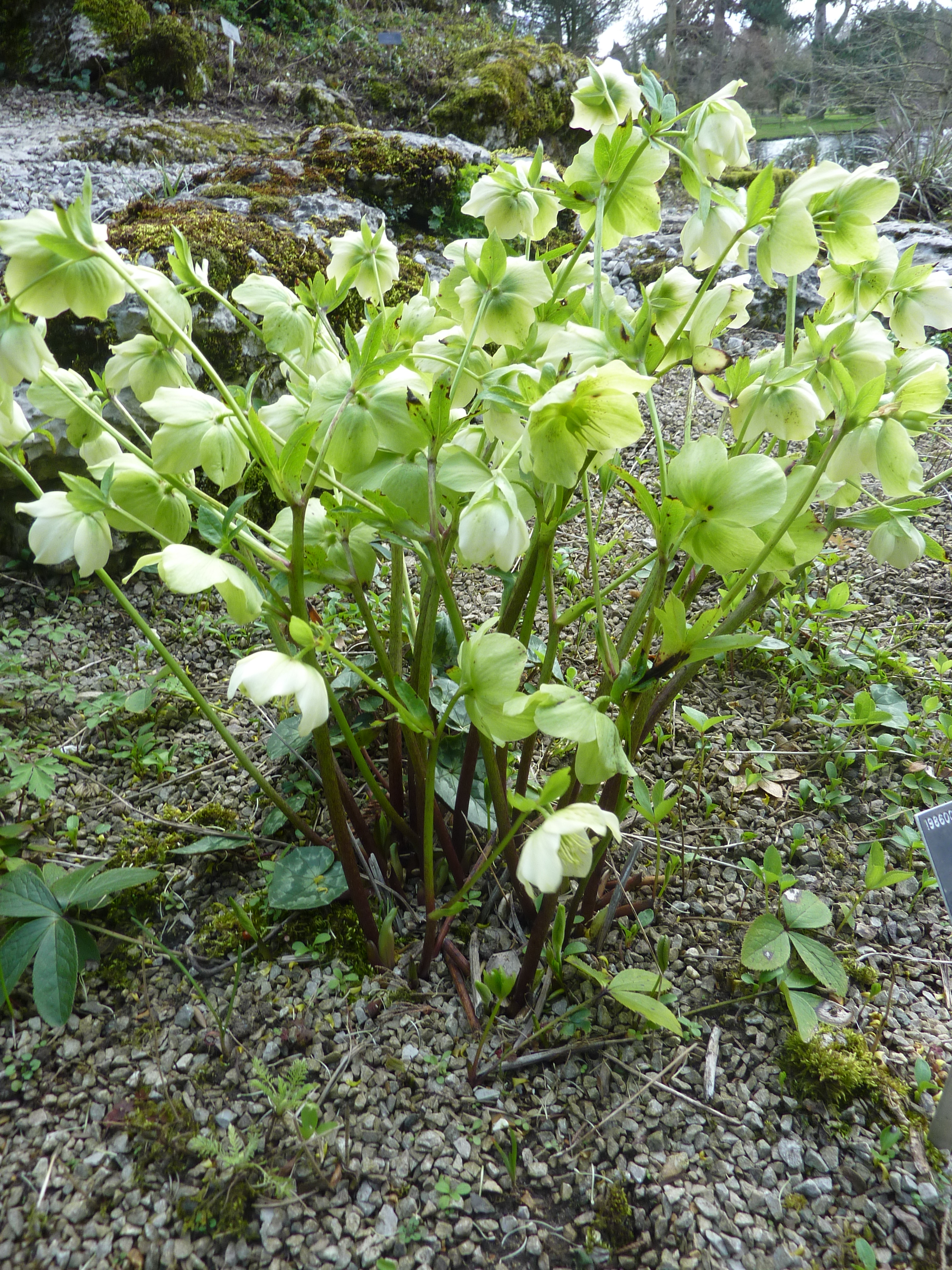
H. odorus

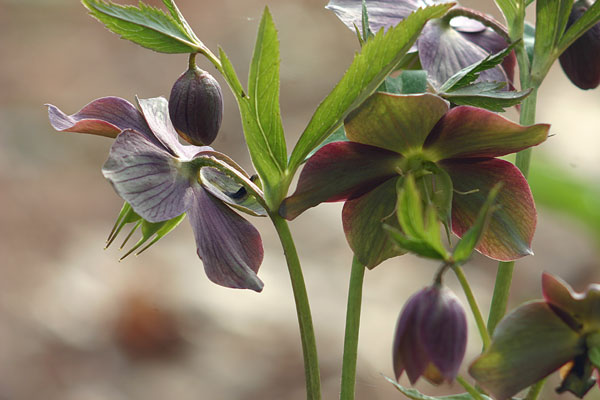
H. purpurascens

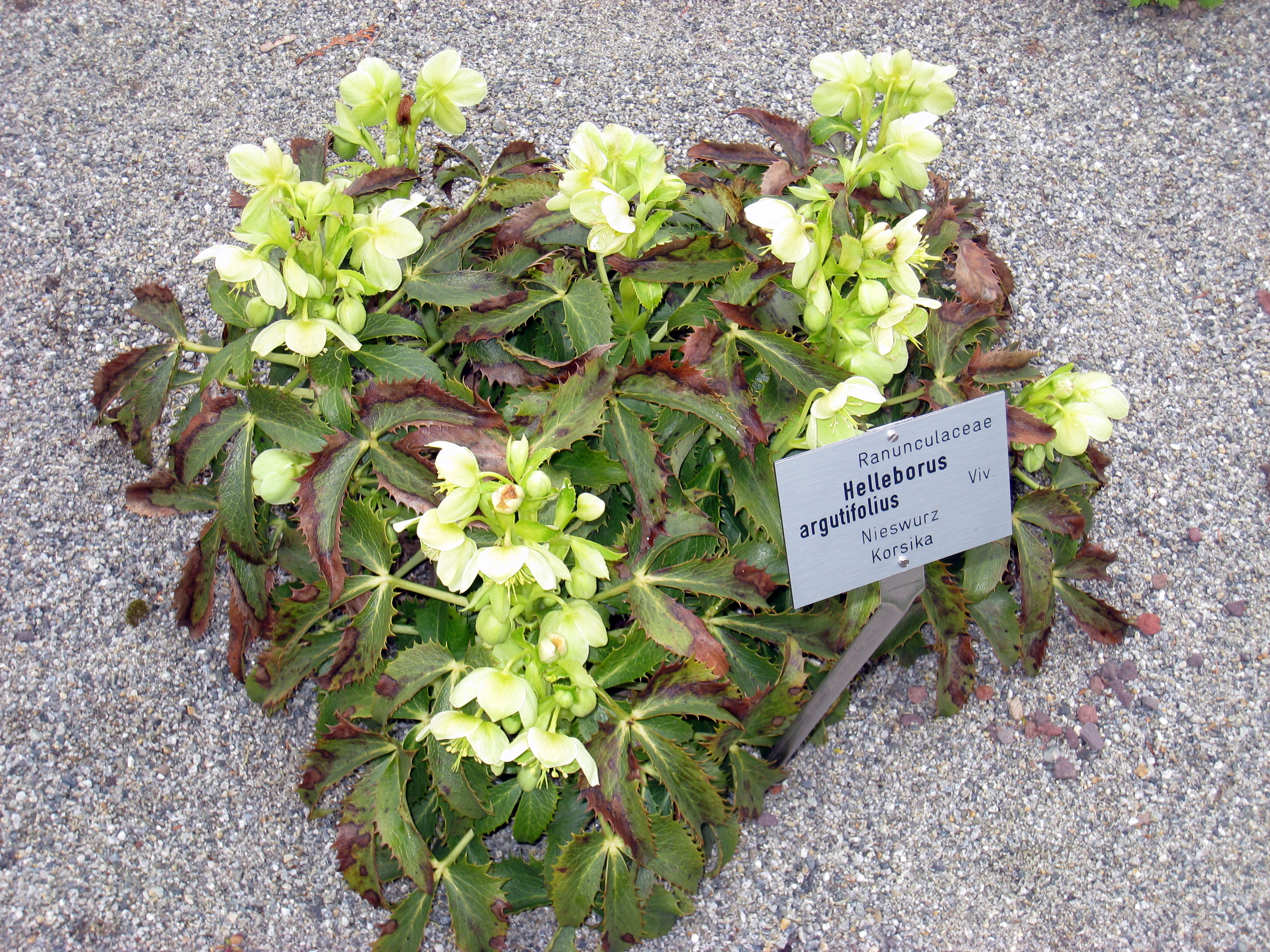
Helleborus argutifolius - Innsbruck Botanical Garden

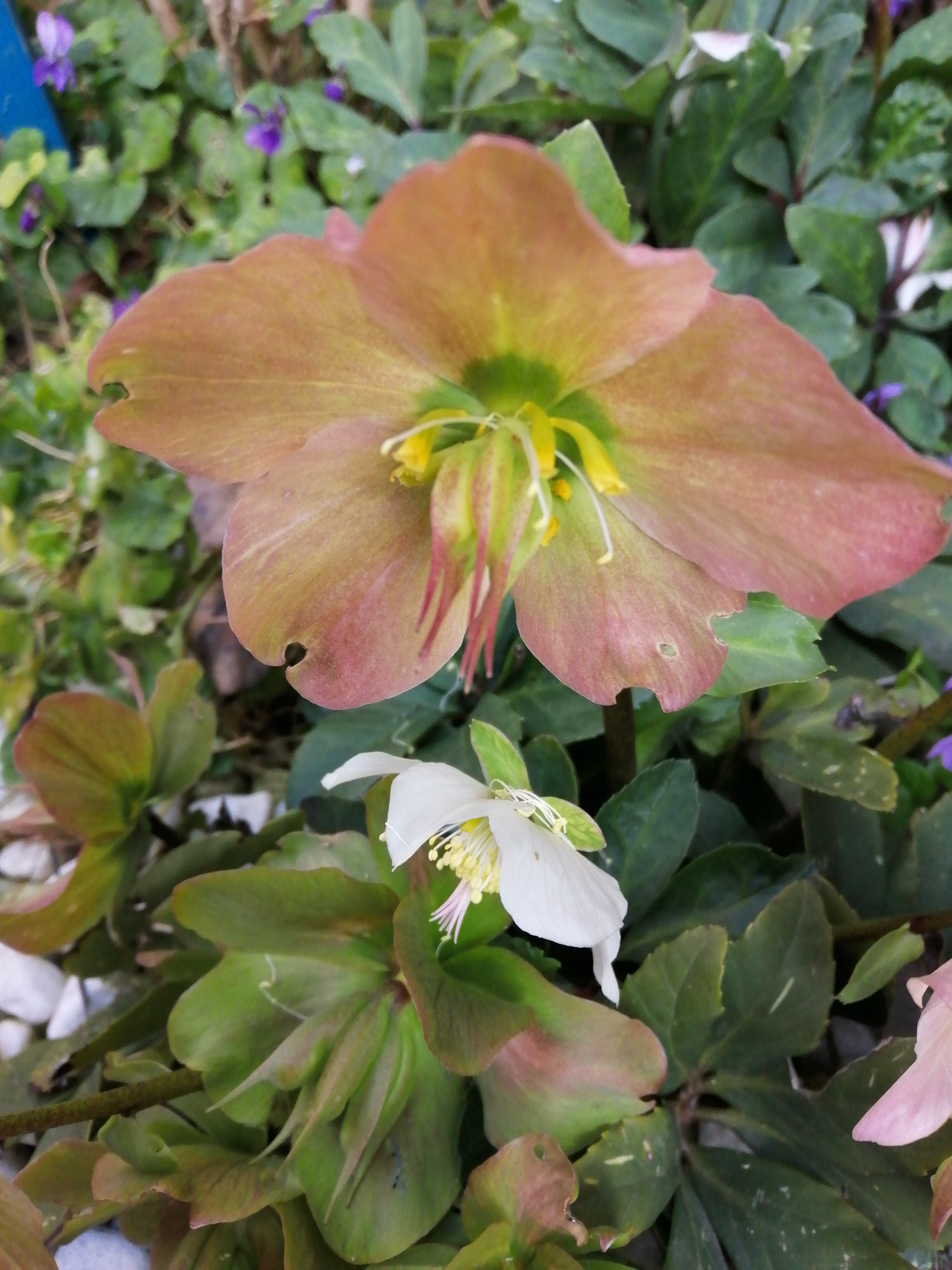
H. niger with fruits and flowers in two different stages

=== Hybrids ===
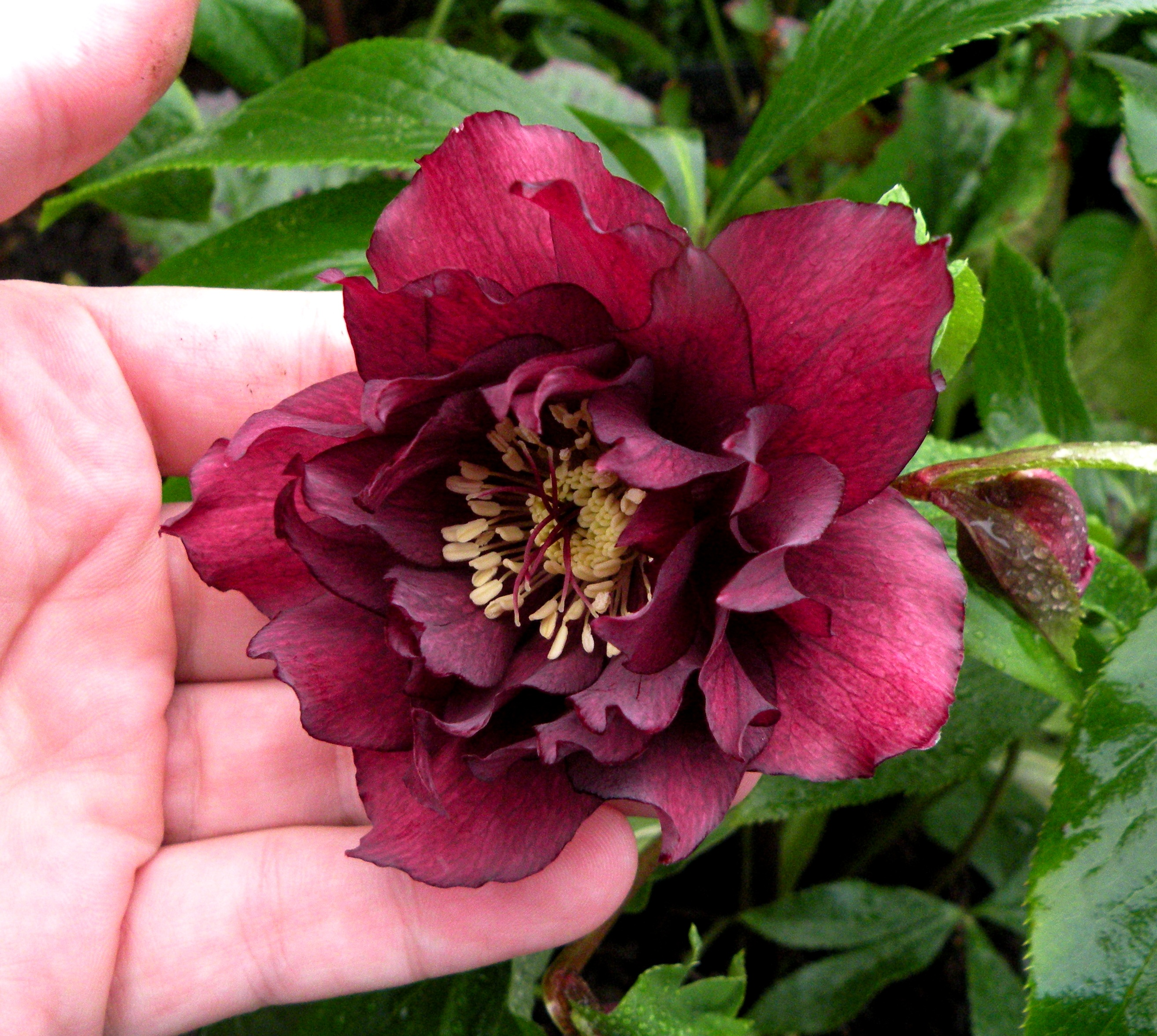
Double hellebore, dark red

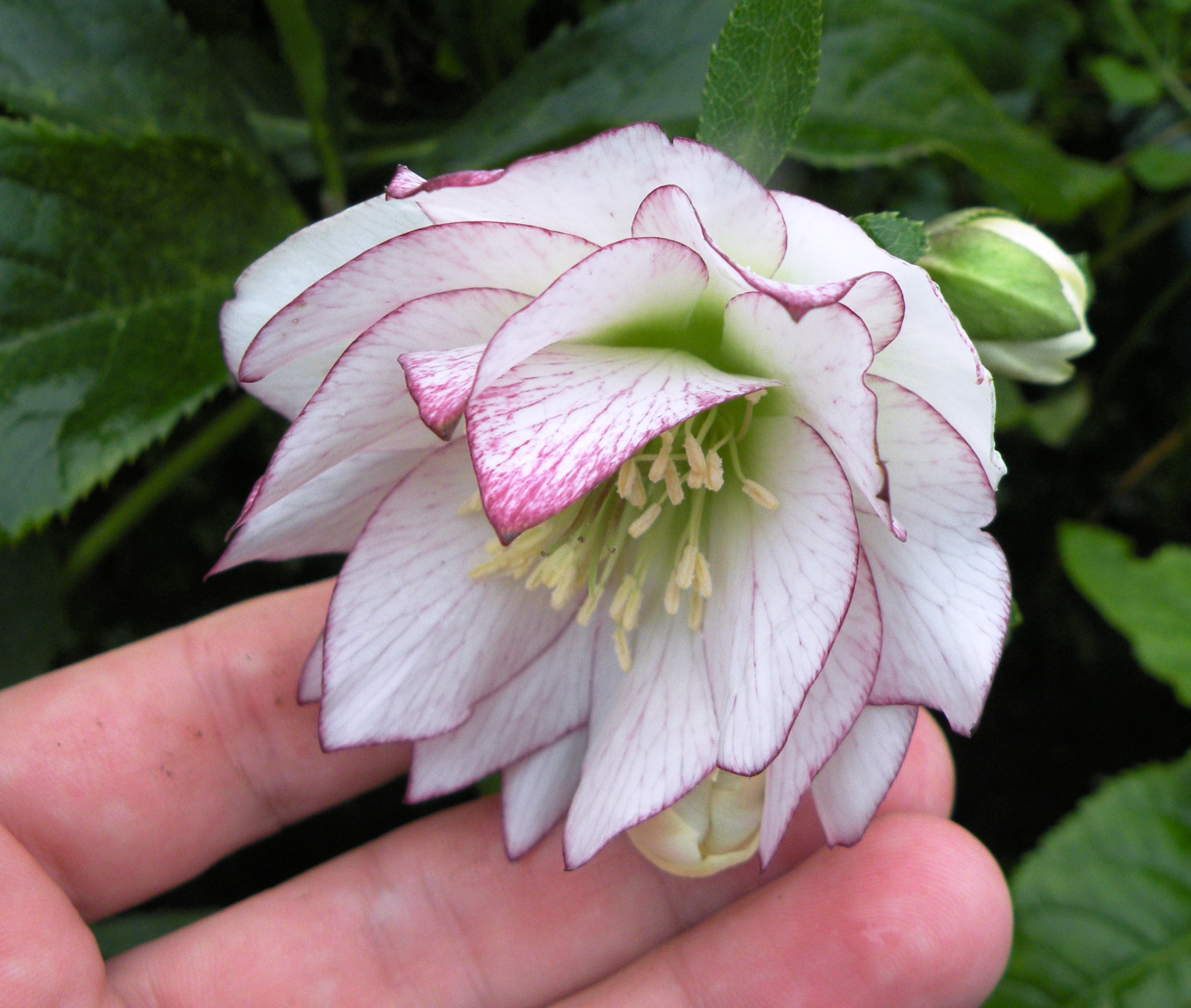
Double white and pink picotee hellebore

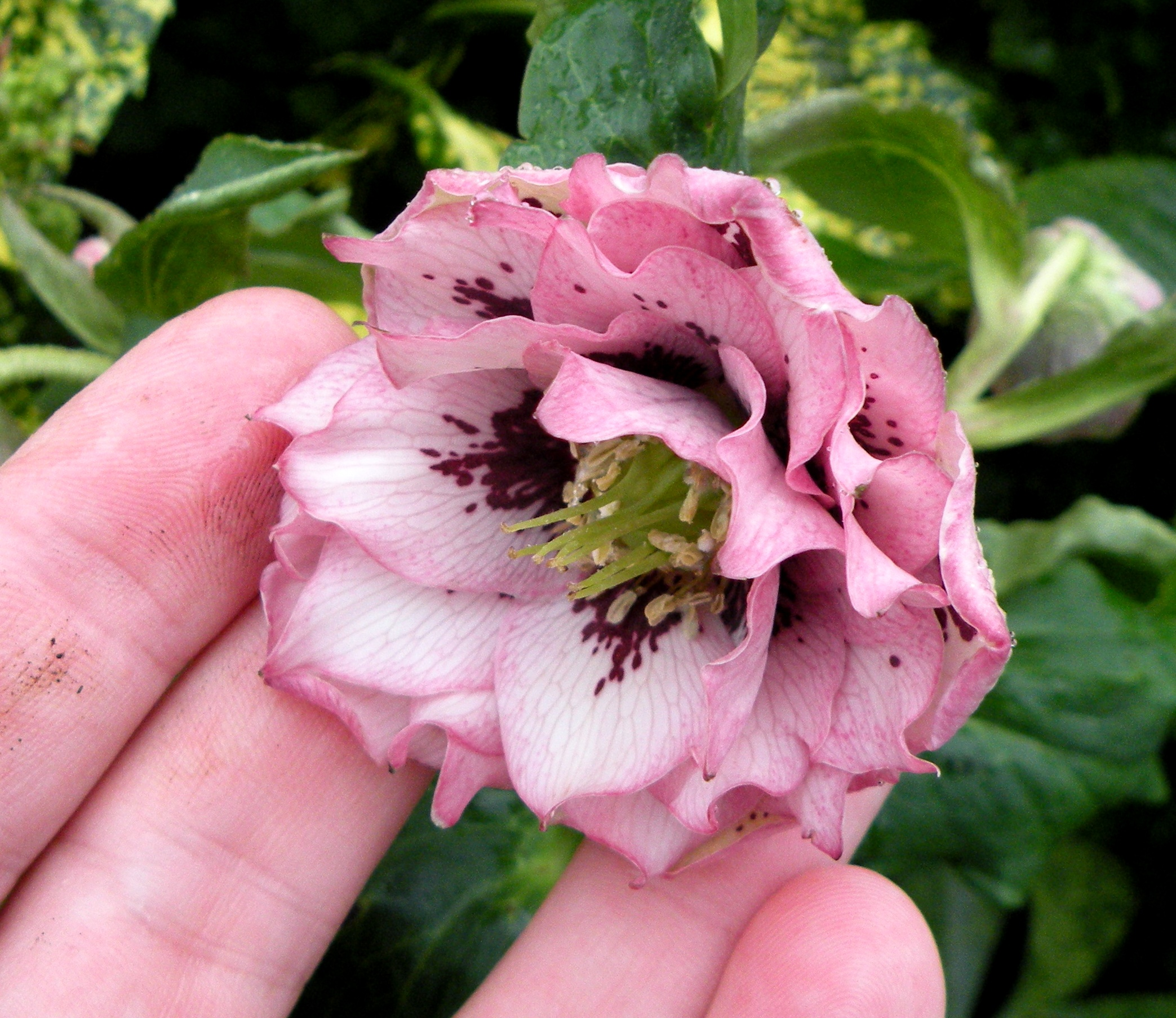
Double pink hellebore with dark blotching

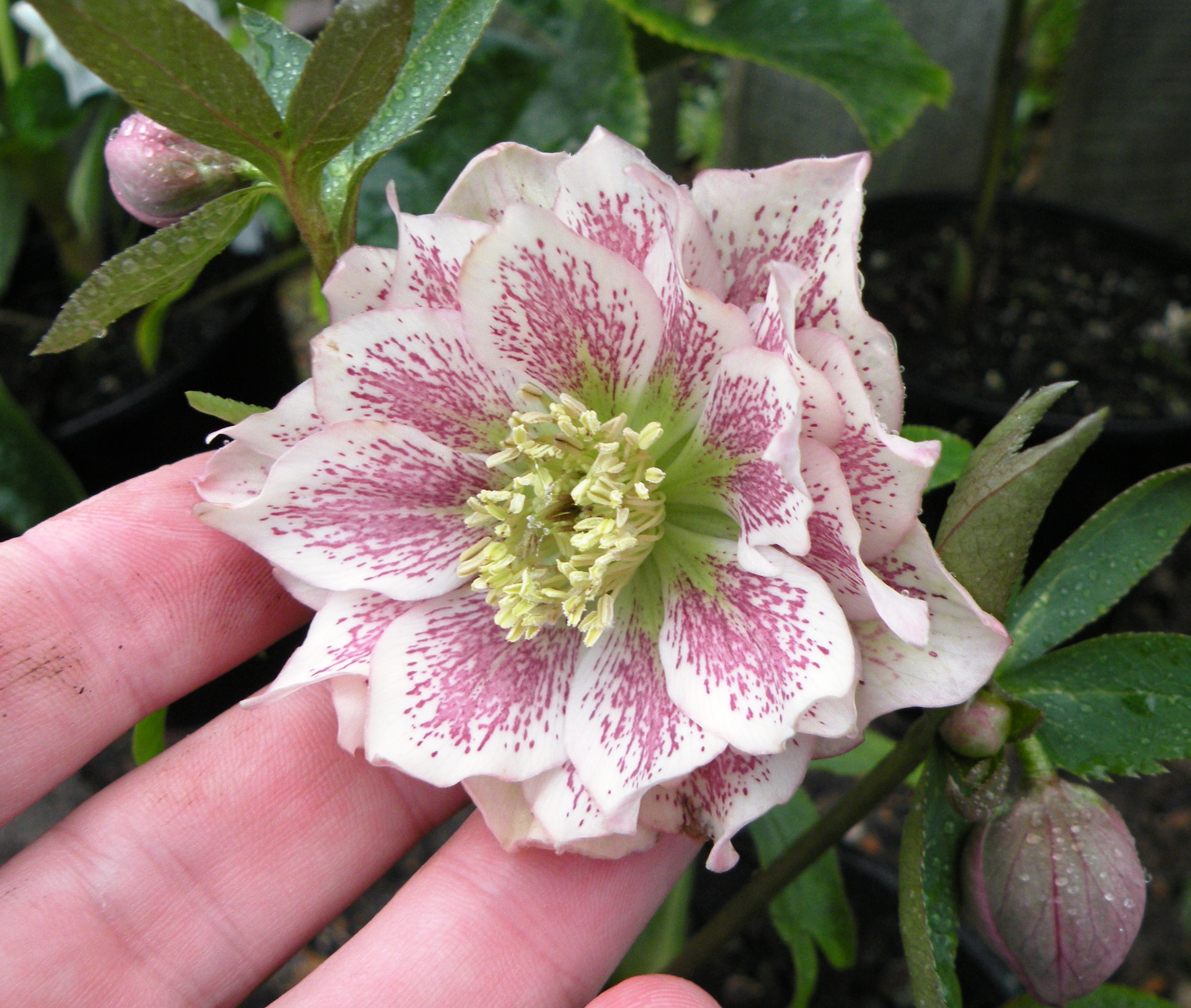
Double white hellebore with pink spotting

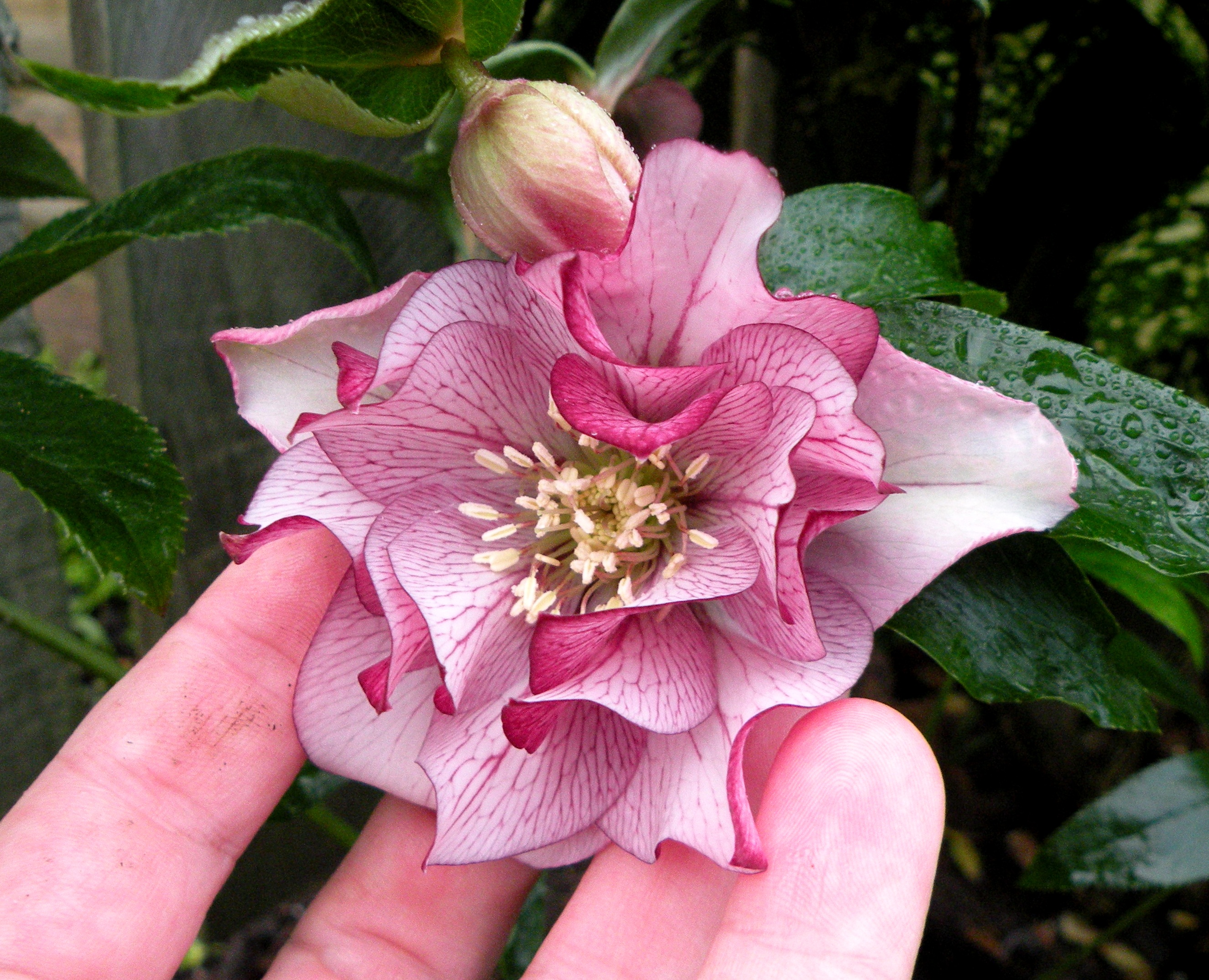
Double pink hellebore with darker pink veining

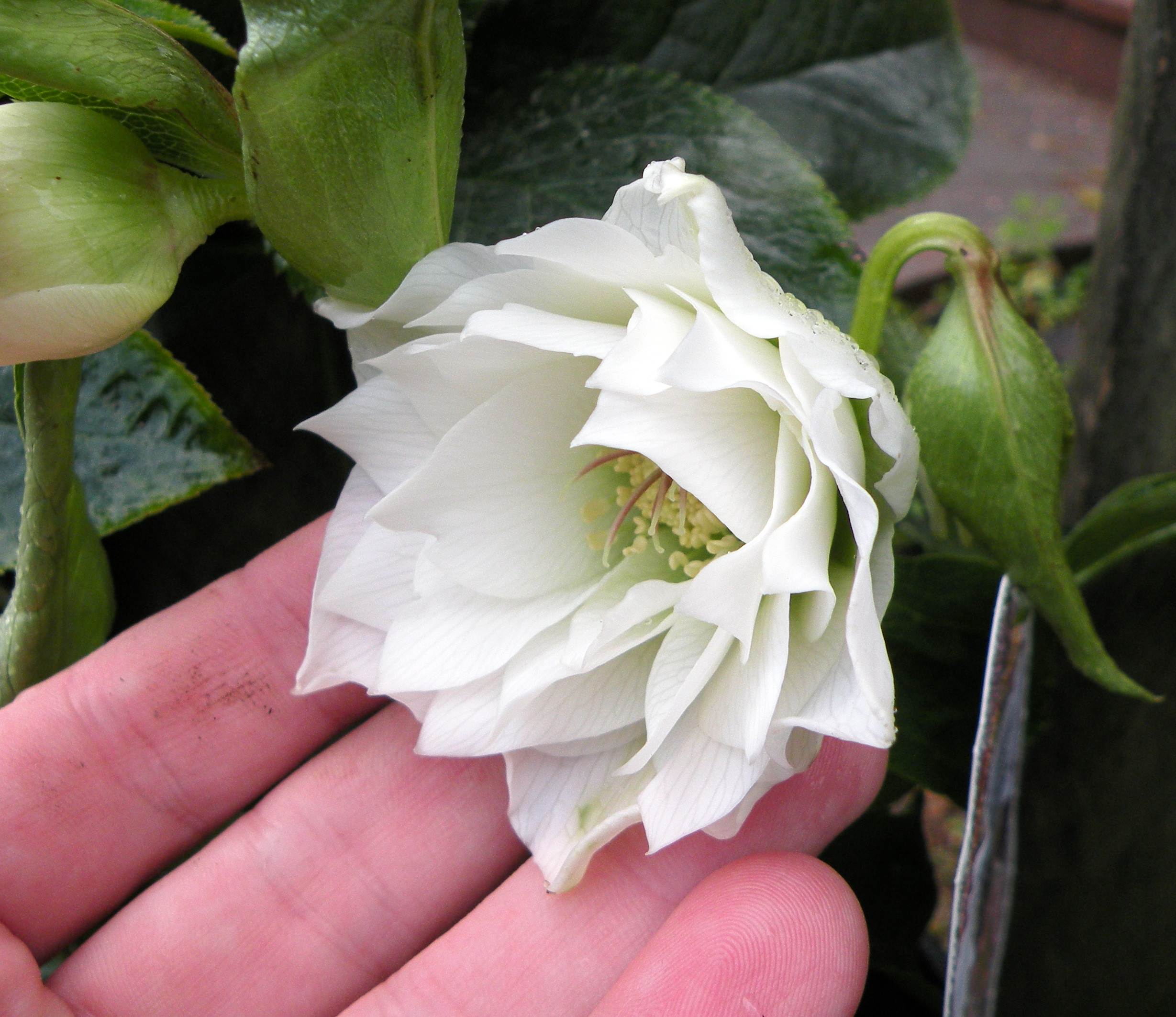
Double white hellebore hybrid 'Betty Ranicar'

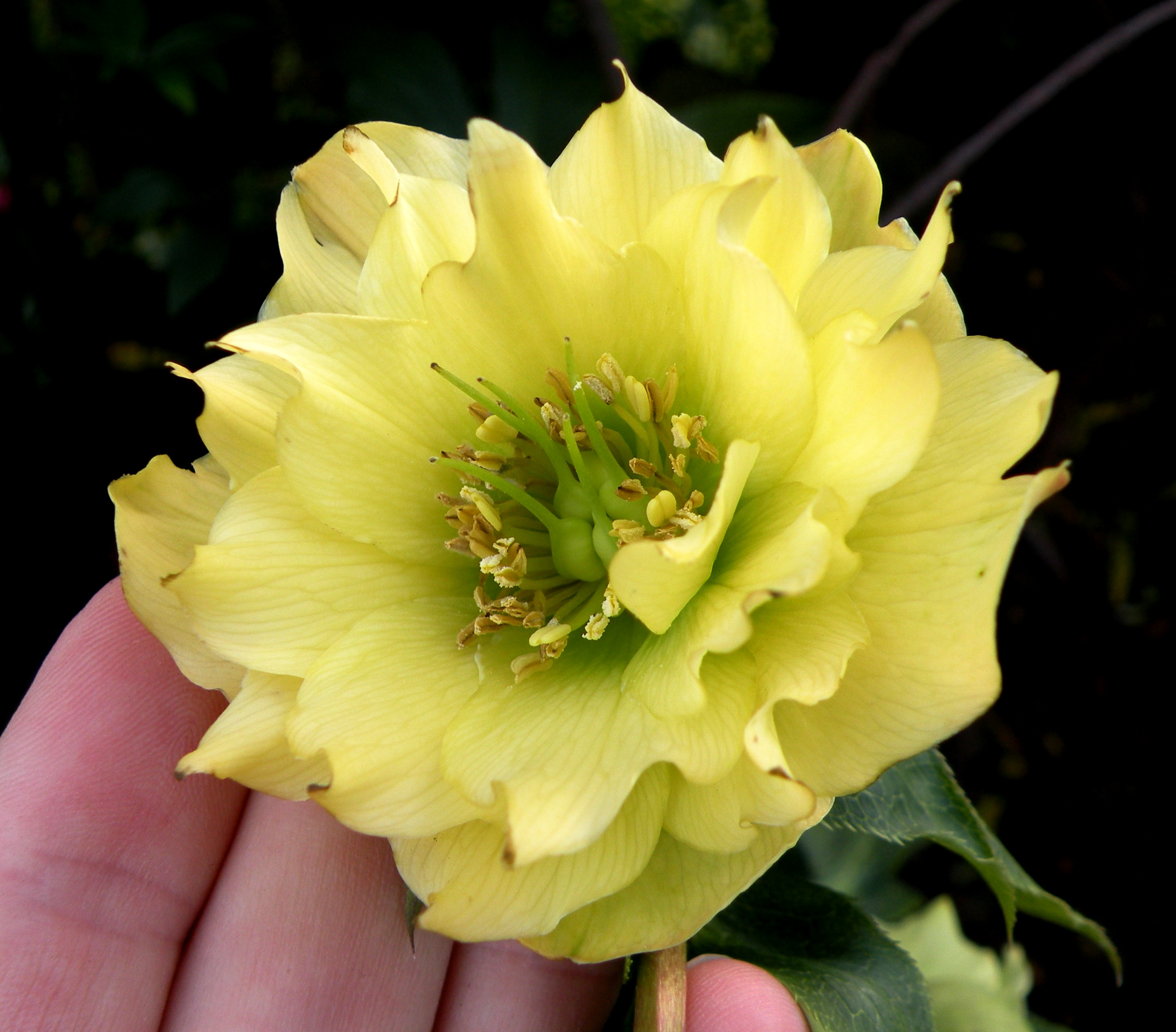
Yellow double hellebore

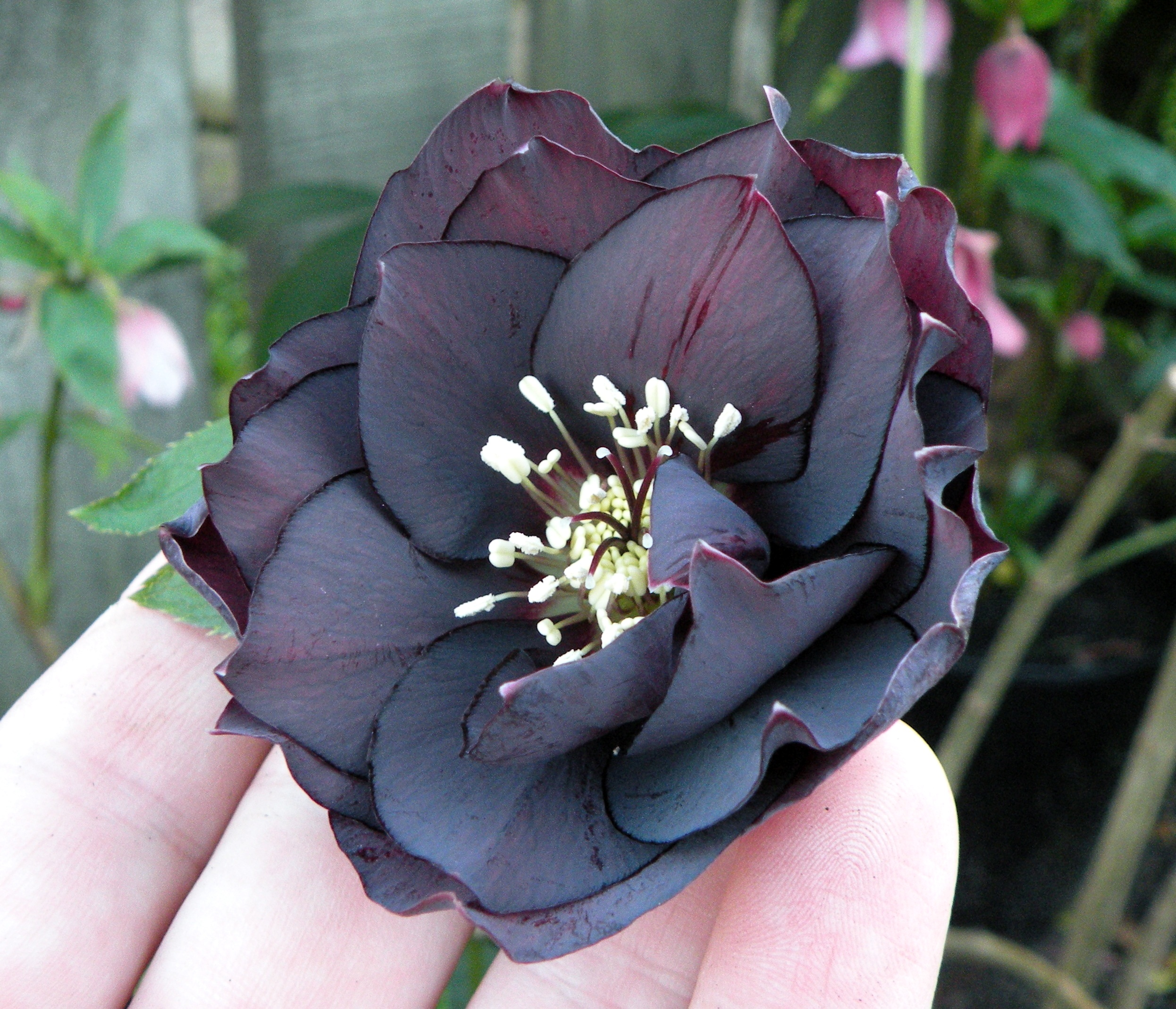
"Blue-black" double hellebore

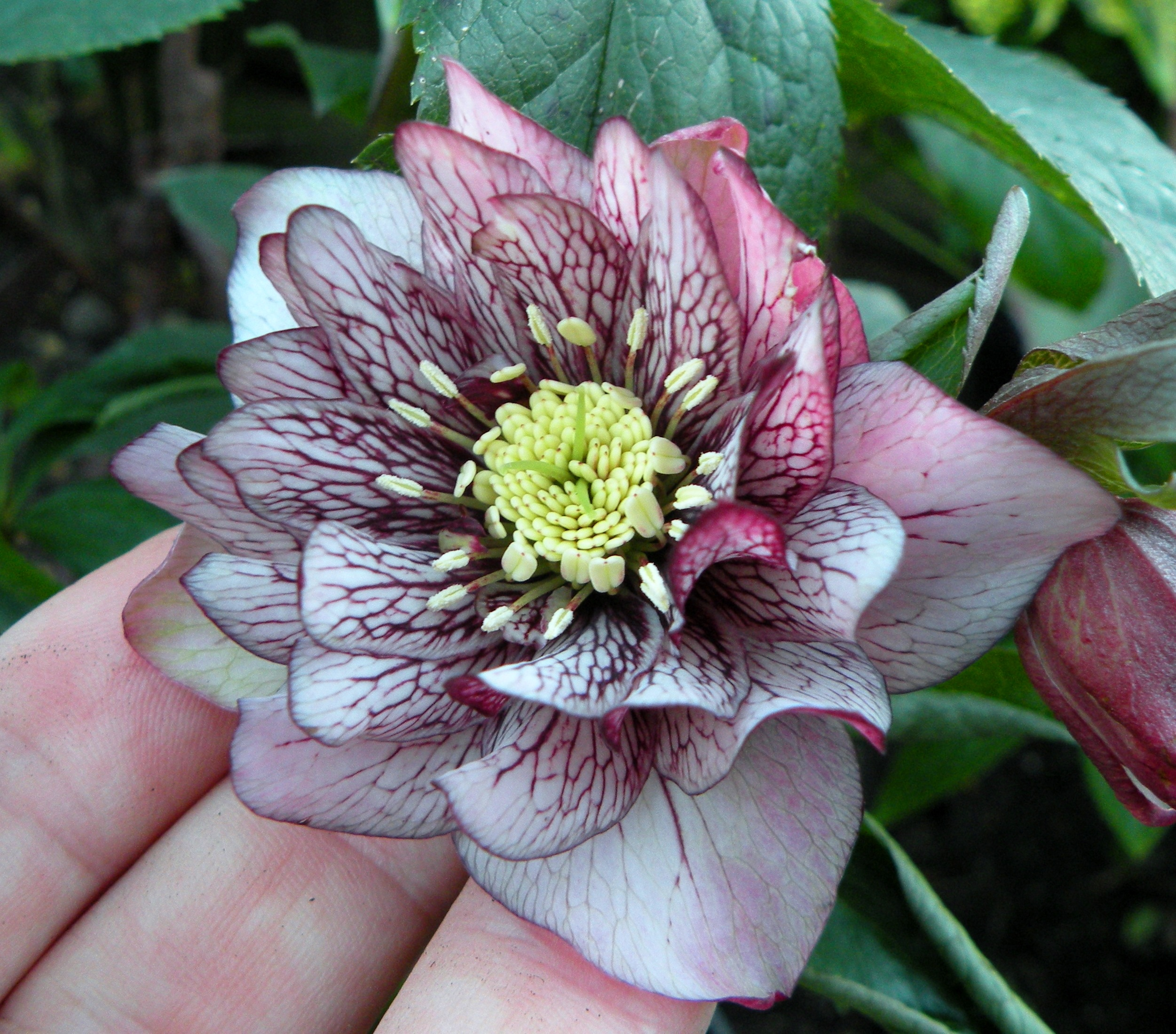
Double pink hellebore with dark venation

== See also ==
- Christmas flowers
- Veratrum
