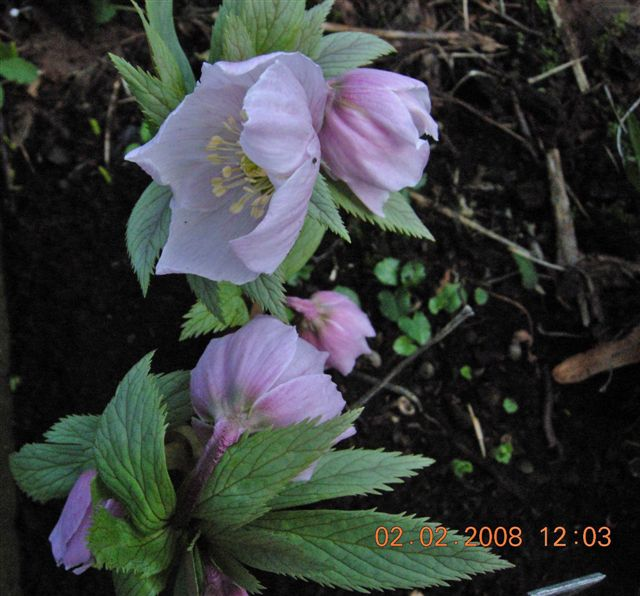

Scientific classification
- Kingdom: Plantae
- Clade: Embryophytes
- Clade: Tracheophytes
- Clade: Spermatophytes
- Clade: Angiosperms
- Clade: Eudicots
- Order: Ranunculales
- Family: Ranunculaceae
- Genus: Helleborus
- Species: H. thibetanus

Binomial name
- Helleborus thibetanus Franch.

= Helleborus thibetanus =

Species of flowering plant

Helleborus thibetanus, the Tibetan hellebore, is a species of flowering plant in the family Ranunculaceae, native to China, in S Gansu, NW Hubei, S Shaanxi and NW Sichuan.

This rhizomatous perennial has a clump of smooth, finely serrated ovate leaves, which appear from early spring to midsummer. The papery, cup shaped flowers are borne in early Spring. They open white, turning pink and finally green.

This hellebore prefers a moist, shaded and sheltered position in neutral or slightly alkaline soil.
