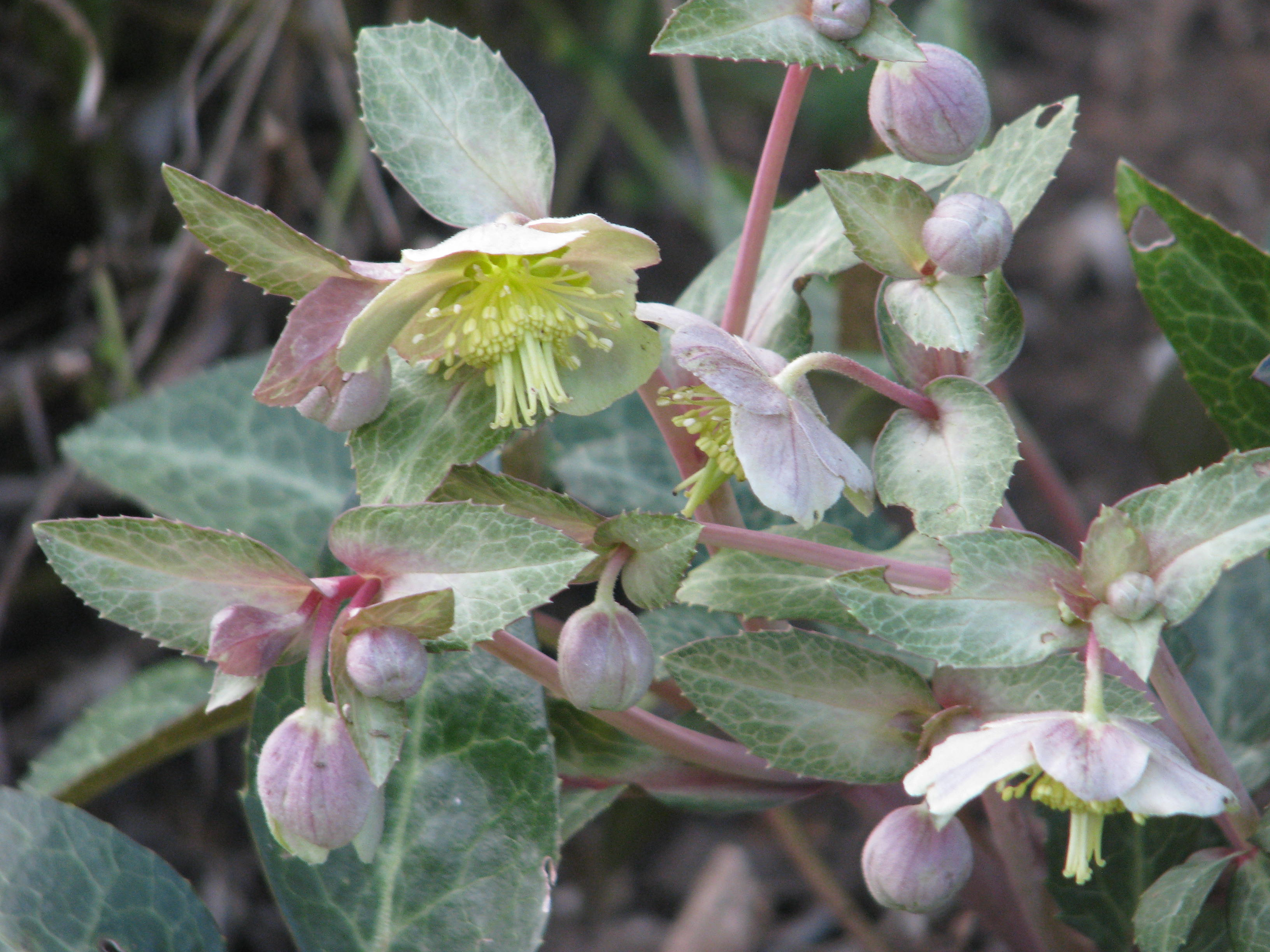

Scientific classification
- Kingdom: Plantae
- Clade: Tracheophytes
- Clade: Angiosperms
- Clade: Eudicots
- Order: Ranunculales
- Family: Ranunculaceae
- Genus: Helleborus
- Species: H. lividus

Binomial name
- Helleborus lividus Aiton

= Helleborus lividus =

Species of flowering plant

Helleborus lividus is a species of flowering plant in the family Ranunculaceae, native to Mallorca and possibly nearby Cabrera, Spain. It is an evergreen perennial growing to 45 cm (18 in) tall by 30 cm (12 in) wide, with deep green or bluish green, glossy leaves and light green or pinkish-green flowers opening nearly flat and appearing from midwinter to early spring. The Latin lividus refers to the colour of the leaves (literally "lead-grey"). It may be best grown in a greenhouse in frost-prone areas. Propagation is from seed.

In cultivation it hybridises readily with the closely related H. argutifolius.
