= Dora Stafford =

British botanist and plant collector (born 1939)

Dora B. Stafford (fl. 1930s) was an English botanist who collected plants in the mountains of Peru in the 1930s. A skilled mountain climber, Stafford used her family’s connections in the Peruvian alpaca wool trade to carry out plant-hunting expeditions high in the Andes, some of which were funded by Frederick Stern. She collected over a thousand species, which she gave to the Royal Botanic Gardens Kew, the British Museum, and the botanical gardens of Edinburgh and Copenhagen. Her collection included the first known Sedum ignescens and some plants named after her, such as Xenophyllum staffordiae, Werneria staffordiae, and Poa staffordiae Tovar. She gave lectures and wrote articles about her plant-collecting expeditions including 'On the Flora of Southern Peru' (Proceedings of the Linnean Society of London 151:3, 1939) and 'Cacti of Southern Peru' (Cactus Journal, 1939).
