= Spinnaker Tower =

Observation tower in Portsmouth, England

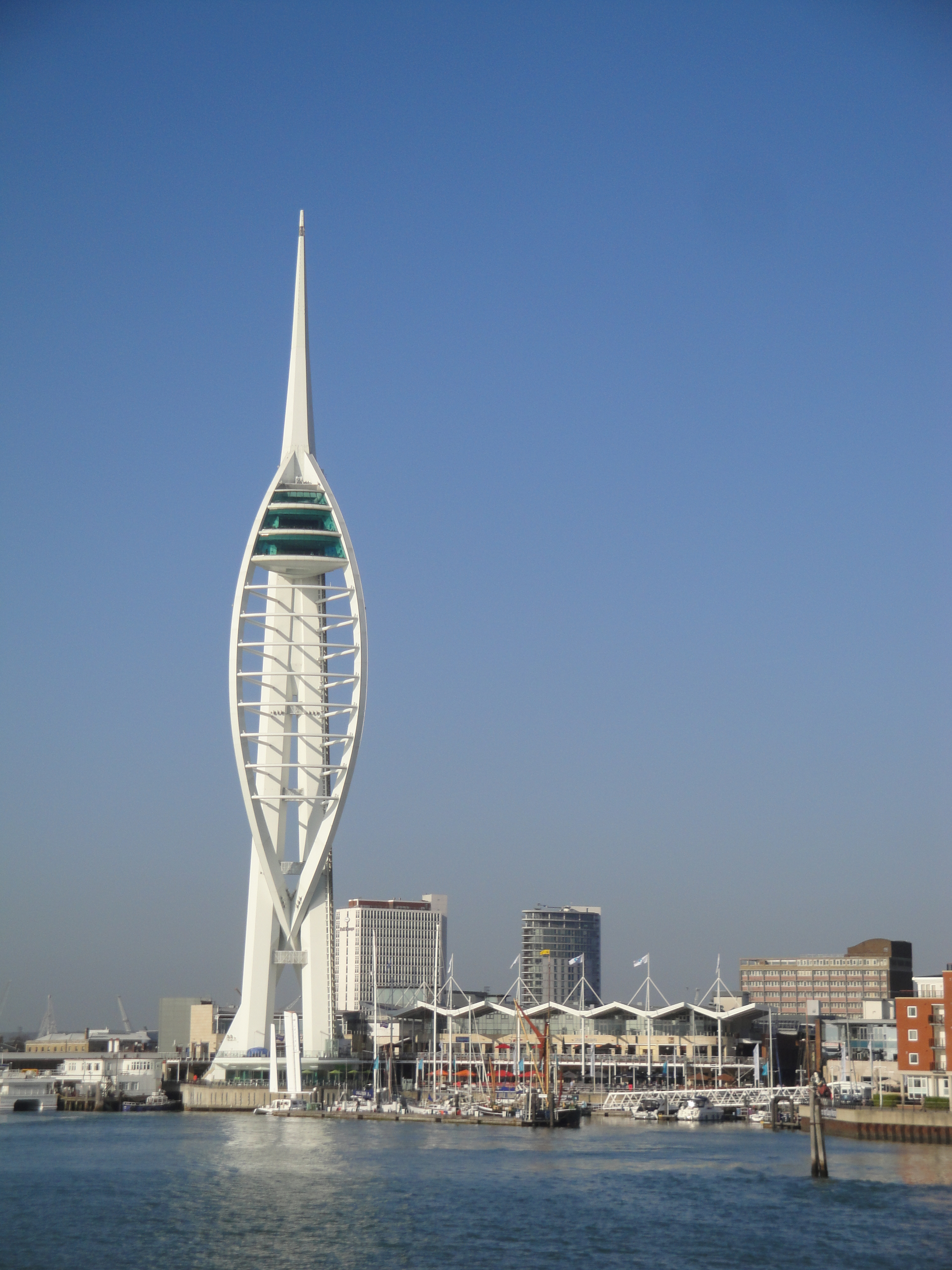
- The Spinnaker Tower
- Interactive map of the Spinnaker Tower area
- Alternative names: Millennium Tower

General information
- Status: Completed
- Type: Observation tower
- Location: Gunwharf Quays; Portsmouth, England
- Coordinates: 50°47′44.22″N 1°06′30.86″W
- Construction started: 2001
- Completed: 2005
- Opened: 18 October 2005
- Cost: £35.6 million

Height
- Antenna spire: 170 m (560 ft)
- Roof: 110 m (360 ft)
- Top floor: 105 m (344 ft)

Technical details
- Floor count: 4 floors
- Lifts/elevators: 1

Design and construction
- Architect: HGP Greentree Allchurch Evans
- Developer: The Millennium Commission
- Structural engineer: Scott Wilson; Halcrow Yolles
- Main contractor: Mowlem

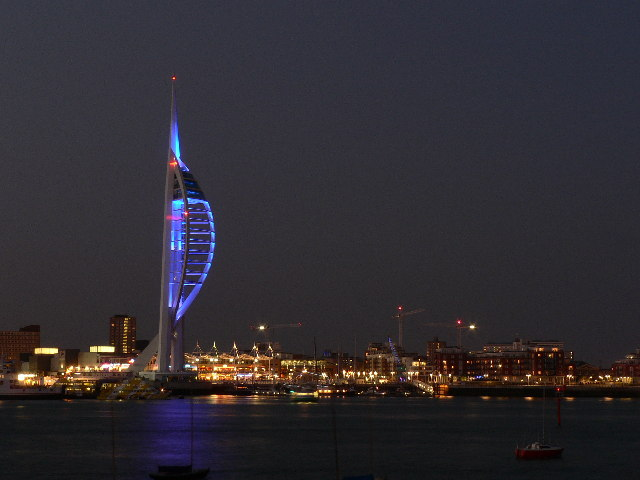
Spinnaker Tower at night in 2005.

The Spinnaker Tower is a 170-metre (560 ft) landmark observation tower in Portsmouth, England. It is the centrepiece of the redevelopment of Portsmouth Harbour, which was supported by a National Lottery grant. The tower's design was chosen by Portsmouth residents from a selection of three different designs in a 1998 public poll. It has three viewing platforms one on top of the other at heights of 100 m, 105 m and 110 m.

The tower was designed by local firm HGP Architects and engineering consultants Scott Wilson and built by Mowlem with steelwork by Butterley Engineering. The Spinnaker Tower reflects Portsmouth's maritime history through its design and is named after a spinnaker, a type of sail that balloons outward. The tower was opened on 18 October 2005.

The tower is owned by Portsmouth City Council and is operationally managed by Continuum Leading Attractions, a cultural attractions group based in York. Continuum also runs five other visitor attractions across the country.

The Spinnaker Tower was repainted and rebranded as the "Emirates Spinnaker Tower" from July 2015 following a five-year commercial sponsorship deal with the Dubai-based Emirates airline. The Emirates sponsorship deal expired in 2020 and the tower reverted to its original all-white paint scheme and name in April 2021. On 5 May 2023, it was announced that Macmillan Cancer Support would become the tower's new sponsor beginning in June.

== Structure ==
At a height of 560 feet (170 m), the tower is one of the tallest accessible structures in the United Kingdom outside London. The tower is visible around Portsmouth, changing the horizon of the area. It can be seen from the Isle of Wight, the Manhood Peninsula, Highdown Gardens and Cissbury Ring in Worthing and Nine Barrow Down in the Purbeck Hills, Dorset.

The tower represents sails billowing in the wind, a design accomplished using two large, white, sweeping metal arcs, which give the tower its spinnaker sail design. The steelwork was fabricated by Butterley Engineering. At the top is a triple observation deck, providing a 360° view of the city of Portsmouth, the Langstone and Portsmouth harbours, and a viewing distance of 37 kilometres (23 mi). The highest of the three observation platforms, the Sky Deck, has only a wire mesh roof, so visitors are open to the elements. The windows extend above head height, so it is not possible to get a view unobstructed by glass. A glass floor is located on the first viewing deck at 100 metres above sea level. It has three viewing platforms one on top of the other at heights of 100 m, 105 m and 110 m. The tower has a design lifetime of 80 years.

== History ==
Portsmouth's Millennium Tower, as it was originally intended to be named, was a project conceived in 1995 to design a monument to commemorate the Millennium celebrations in the year 2000. It received UK National Lottery funding and was intended to open in late 1999.

A choice of three different Millennium Tower designs were presented to the people of Portsmouth for a public poll in early 1998.

- Spinnaker, three observation decks incorporated within the top of a spinnaker sail-shaped truss structure, supported by conjoined twin towers that narrowed to a pinnacle at the top.
- Globe, a multi-floor transparent observation globe supported by twin support columns on opposing sides of the globe.
- Triple, three towers in a narrow triangular formation, the towers linked together by trusses. A tallest of the three towers (with a funnel-like top) giving access to offset observation decks supported by the two shorter towers.

The poll was undertaken by Portsmouth City Council in conjunction with Portsmouth's local newspaper, The News between 11 February 1998 and 23 February 1998. The total number of votes received were 9,476, with 65% of the votes selecting Spinnaker, a design by local architects Hedley Greentree Associates Ltd.

Because of political, financial, contractual and construction problems and extra funding requests by the builders Mowlem, construction did not begin until 2001 and was completed in mid-2005. Because of the six-year delay in opening and its not having been ready for the Millennium as planned, the tower was renamed Spinnaker Tower instead, the design name it had been called in the 1998 public poll.

The overall development project was over budget, with the tower costing £35.6 million alone. Taxpayers were never intended to fund the tower, but Portsmouth City Council eventually contributed £11.1 million towards construction.

In March 2004, Portsmouth Council's former leader Cllr Leo Madden resigned as leader of the Labour Group on the council after a highly critical report of the council's handling of the project and its failure to exploit revenue opportunities, such as the Millennium. Barry Smith, the project's legal advisor, also retired after being suspended on full pay, mostly because of controversy over the contract with the builders, which at one point would have cost the council more to cancel than to complete.

The tower was dedicated on 16 October 2005 and opened two days later. On opening day, the tower's project manager, David Greenhalgh, and representatives of Mowlem and Maspero were stranded in its malfunctioning external lift (built by Maspero) for an hour and a half. Abseiling engineers were called to rescue them. David Greenhalgh said "It is personally very embarrassing as project manager and is very disappointing and upsetting". Some, including the franchise's chief executive, felt it was rather fitting that these particular people had been trapped. The external lift was removed during December 2012.

Once open, the tower attracted crowds in excess of expectations, despite only the internal lift working, with more than 600,000 people visiting it in the first year. It is one of a number of observation towers around the world that have become popular, including Seattle's Space Needle, Vancouver's Harbour Centre, Toronto's CN Tower, Blackpool's Tower, New York City's One World Trade Center (as well as the original Twin Towers) and Shanghai's Oriental Pearl Tower.

In June 2006, the local press raised a concern that the tower might be forced to close. All public buildings in the UK require disabled access under the Disability Discrimination Act 1995. With the external lift inoperative and only a single internal lift and stairs available as emergency escape routes, disabled people were not allowed to access the tower if they would be unable to use the stairs because a minimum of two escape routes are required by law. This problem was rectified by investing in an evacuation chair and training staff to use it. In the event of evacuation, should the internal lift be inoperable, those unable to navigate the 570 steps can use the evacuation chair.

It was reported in May 2008 that the Spinnaker Tower had suffered from a number of issues since opening, including a malfunctioning external glass lift. During the final construction phase, a protester from the rights group Fathers 4 Justice scaled the tower wearing a high-visibility jacket and unfurling a banner in the process. Another incident happened a year later when a base jumper managed to get past site security and jumped off the Tower; he quickly ran off site after parachuting down.

The Spinnaker Tower, being a landmark of southern England, features in the title sequence of the BBC South Today news programme. It also features on ITV News.

In June 2009, the tower's operators succeeded in gaining permission for a freefall ride to be attached. It opened to the public in June 2018 and featured a bungee jump freefall into a crash net.

In 2006, the tower won the RICS Project of the Year award and the RICS Regeneration award.

== Commercial sponsorship with Emirates (2015–2020) ==
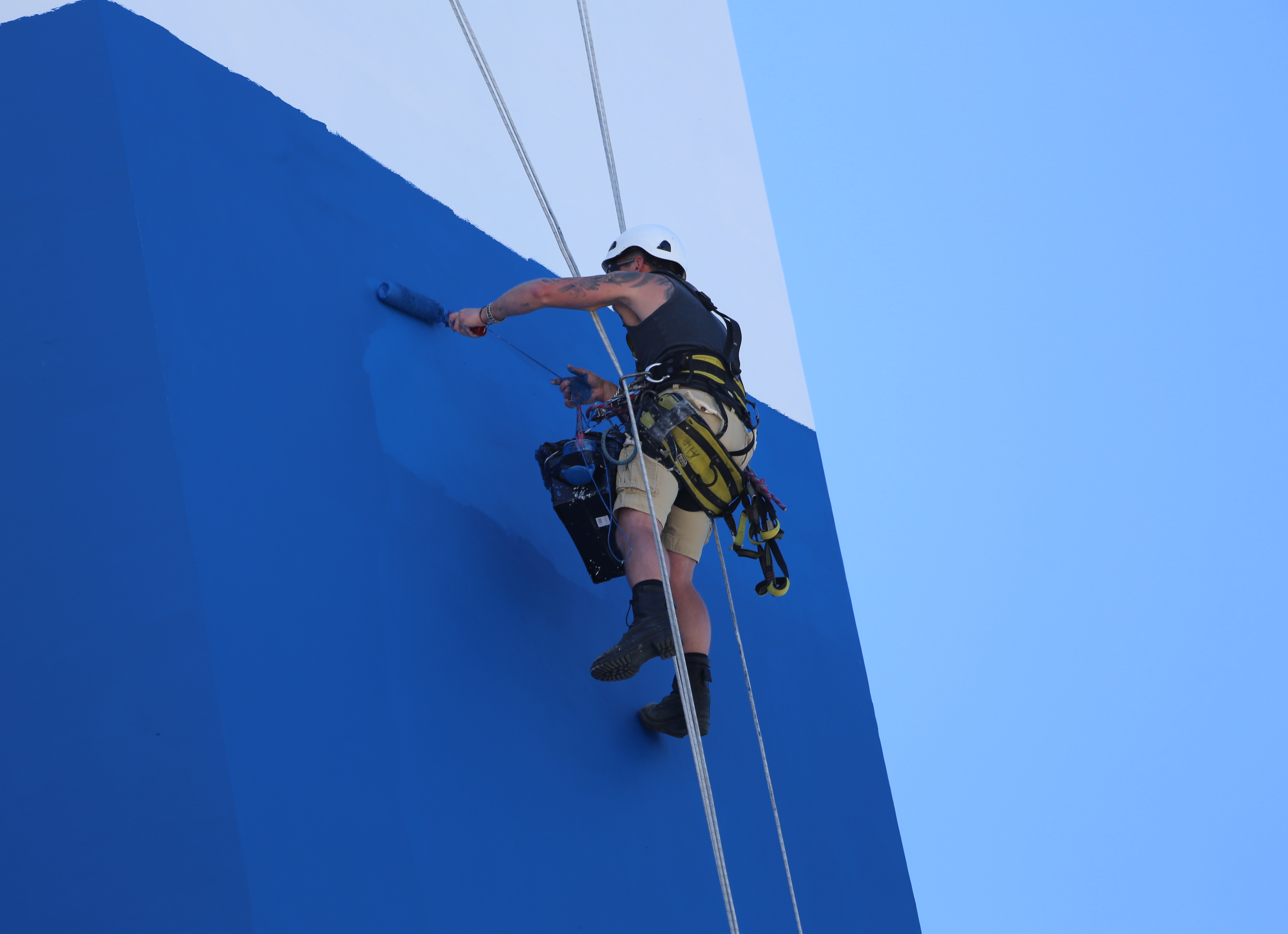
The tower being painted blue in 2015 when it was being sponsored by Emirates. Note the gold paint had not been painted on the tower yet

In May 2015, as part of a wider effort to "generate additional revenue by using the advertising potential of council-owned land and other assets", Portsmouth City Council proposed selling the tower's naming rights to a commercial sponsor. The proposed sponsorship deal would include the naming rights for the tower for at least five years, repainting and rebranding the tower in the sponsor's choice of colours and logos and new signage to be installed "no later than July 17" ahead of the 2015 America's Cup World Series. Dubai-based airline Emirates was reported to be the favoured sponsor, with the tower to be renamed as the Emirates Spinnaker Tower.

On 5 June 2015, the city council confirmed that Emirates had been secured as the sponsor. Councillor Luke Stubbs said: "It's clearly a very good deal for the city and shows the benefit that Portsmouth is deriving from the America’s Cup... This also associates Portsmouth with a global brand and that can only be a good thing." The tower was to be repainted in a red and white colour scheme—similar to that of local football rivals Southampton F.C.—as part of the rebranding but following a petition with over 10,000 signatures, Portsmouth City Council decided to rethink the change. The new design, unveiled on 19 June 2015, featured a blue, gold and white colour scheme. Tim Clark, President and CEO of Emirates said: "We listened to the feedback and worked with the council to adapt the designs in order to create something that Portsmouth residents will be proud of." In April 2021 the tower was repainted its original all-white colour, as the five year sponsorship deal with Emirates had ended on 30 June 2020.

On 5 May 2023, Portsmouth City Council announced a new partnership with the Macmillan Cancer Support, with the charity becoming the tower's new sponsor beginning in June. Unlike the previous Emirates sponsorship, the tower will not be repainted or renamed, it will just see the charity's logo on one of the tower's legs and the main sign to the entrance. The deal will allow the charity to hold fundraising events at the tower.

== Gallery ==
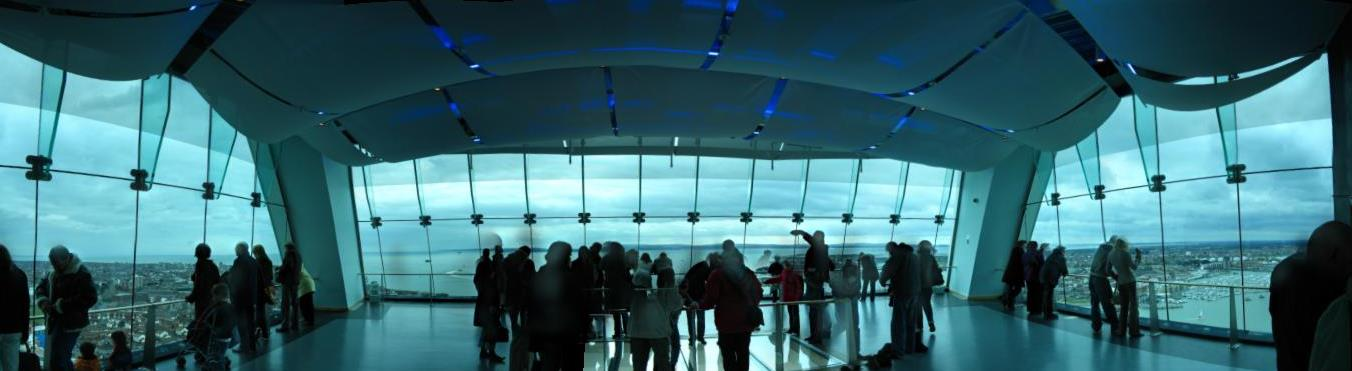
Panoramic view of the first deck, showing the glass walkway.

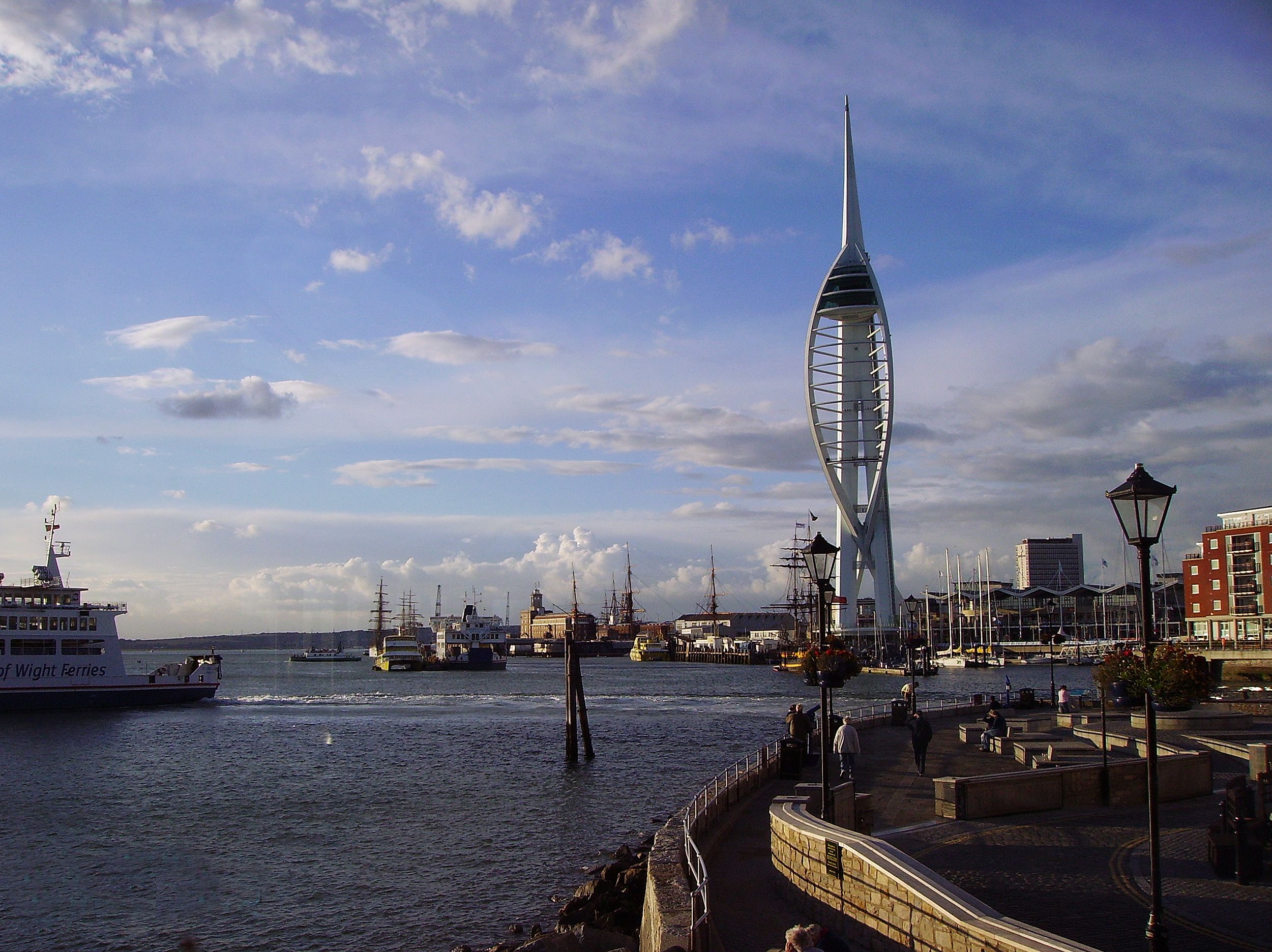
The Tower overlooking the harbour.

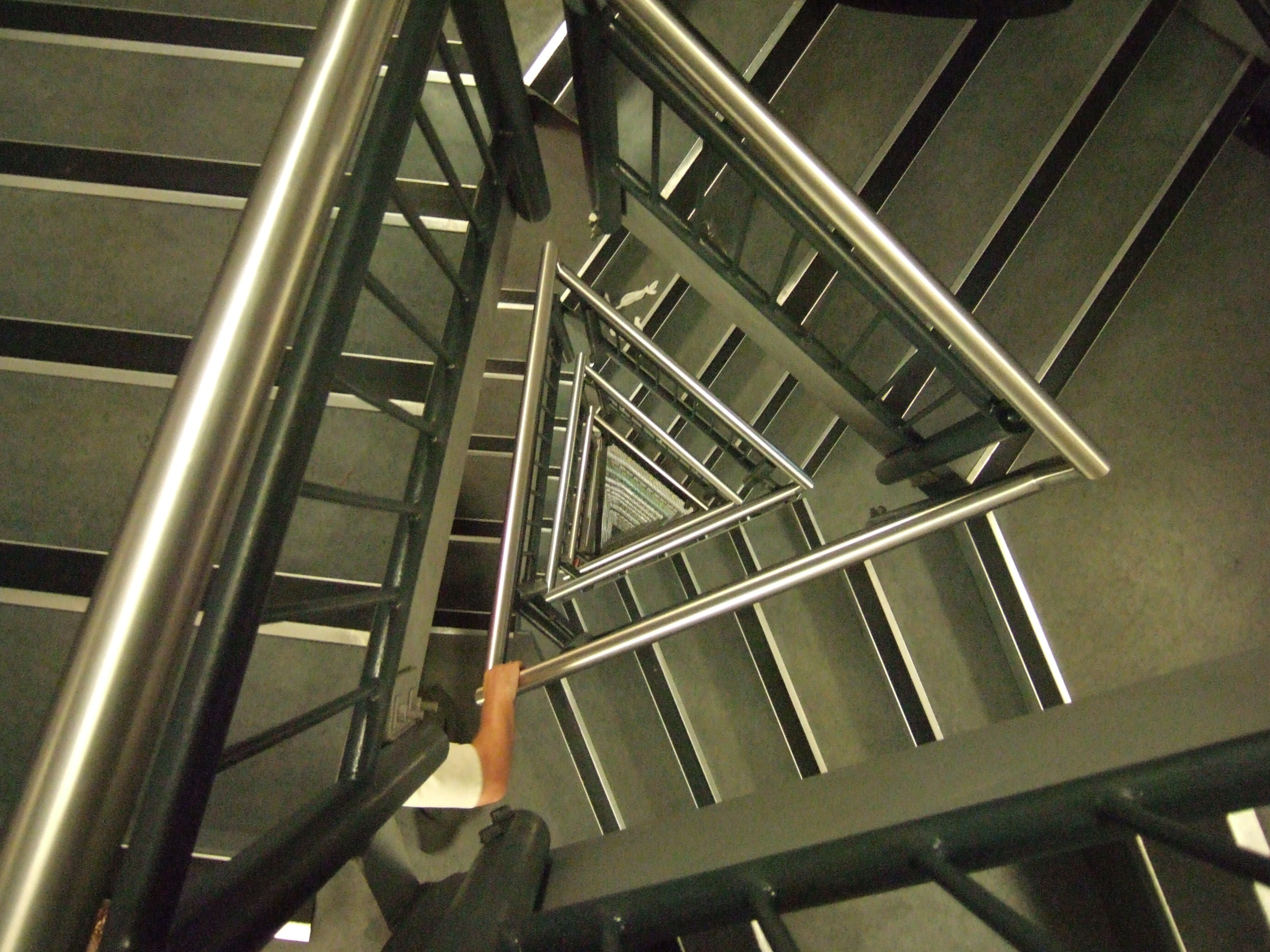
The triangular staircase that must be navigated should an evacuation be needed.

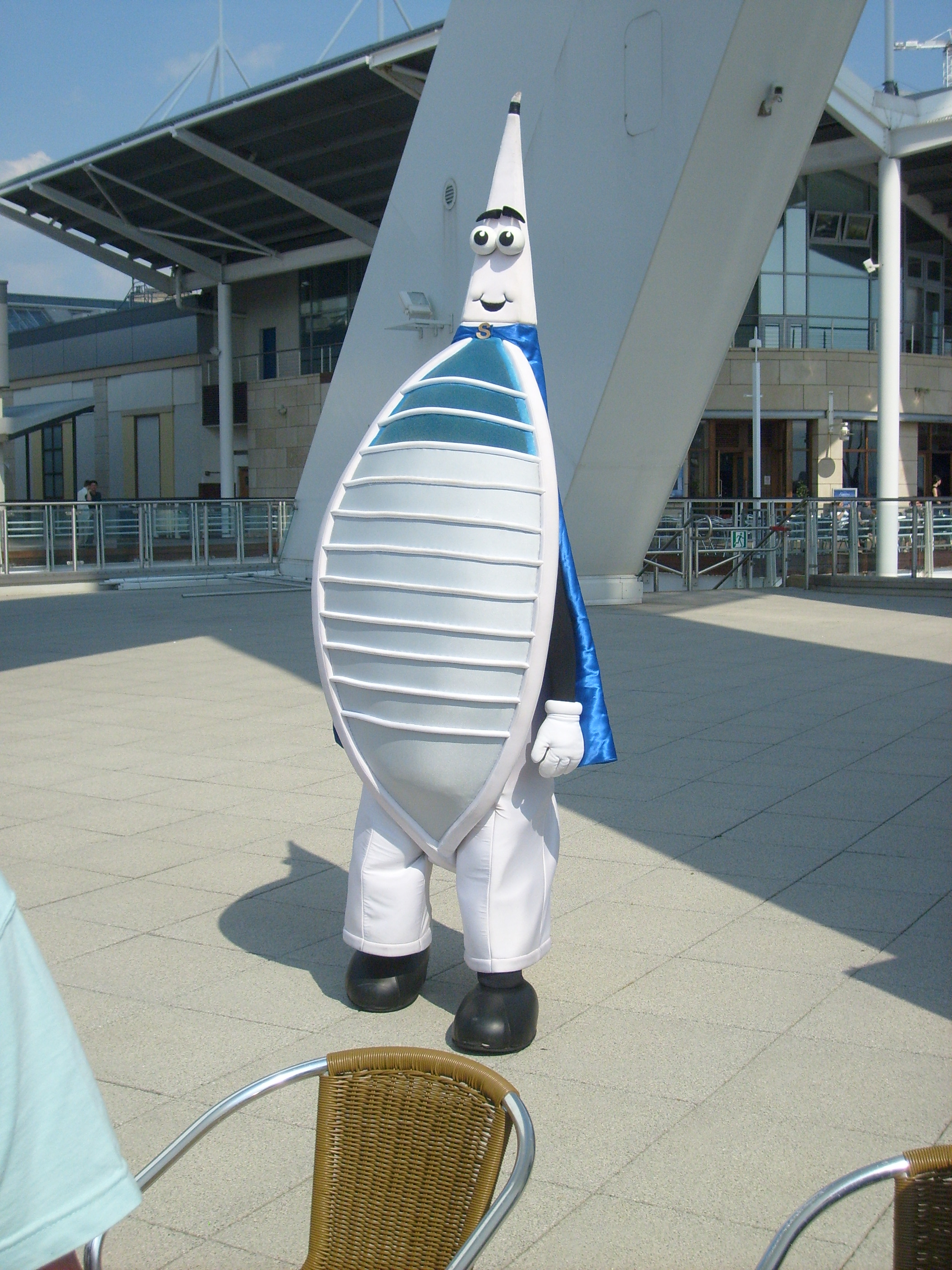
'Spinny', Spinnaker Tower's former mascot.

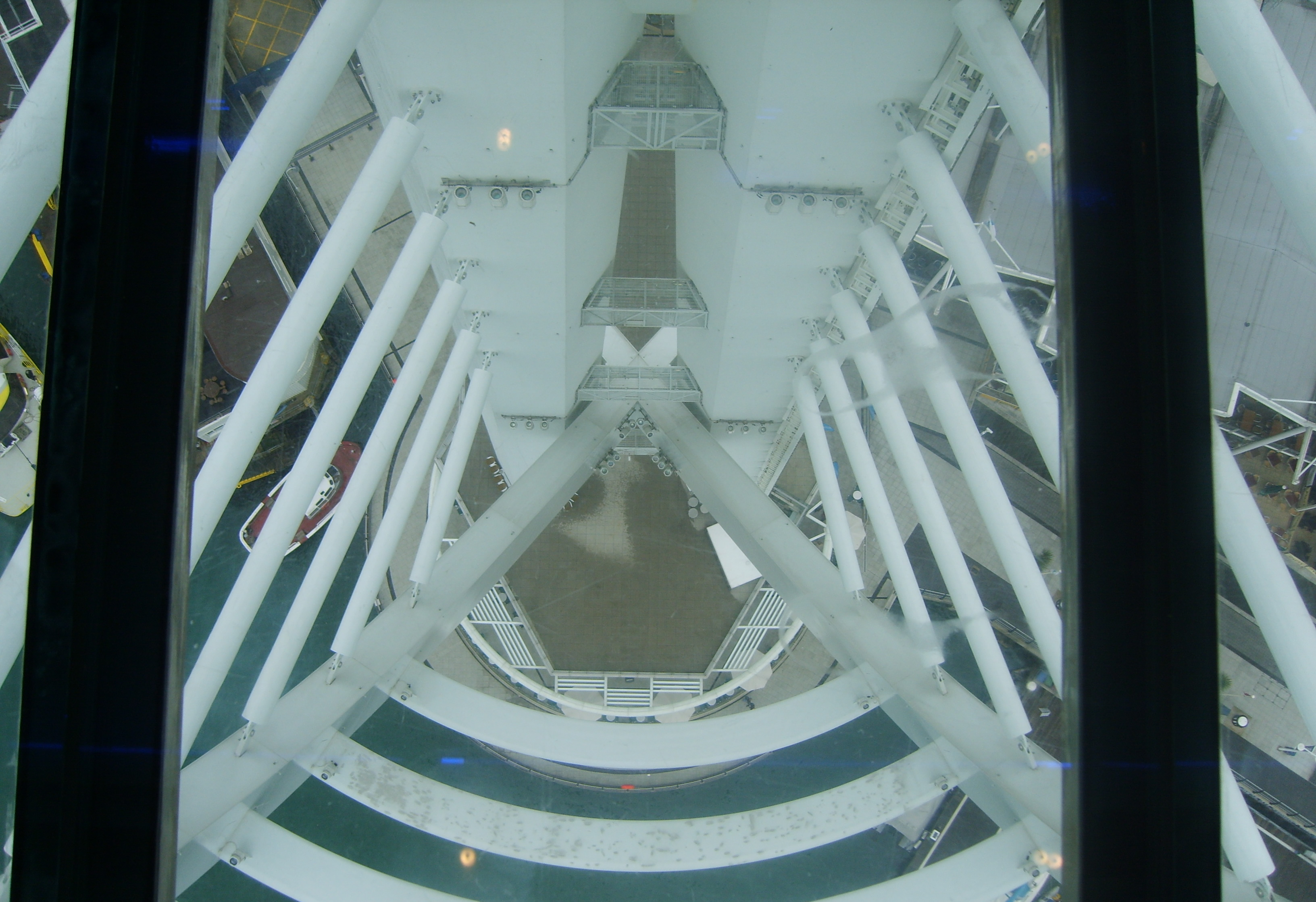
The view through the glass floor of the tower.

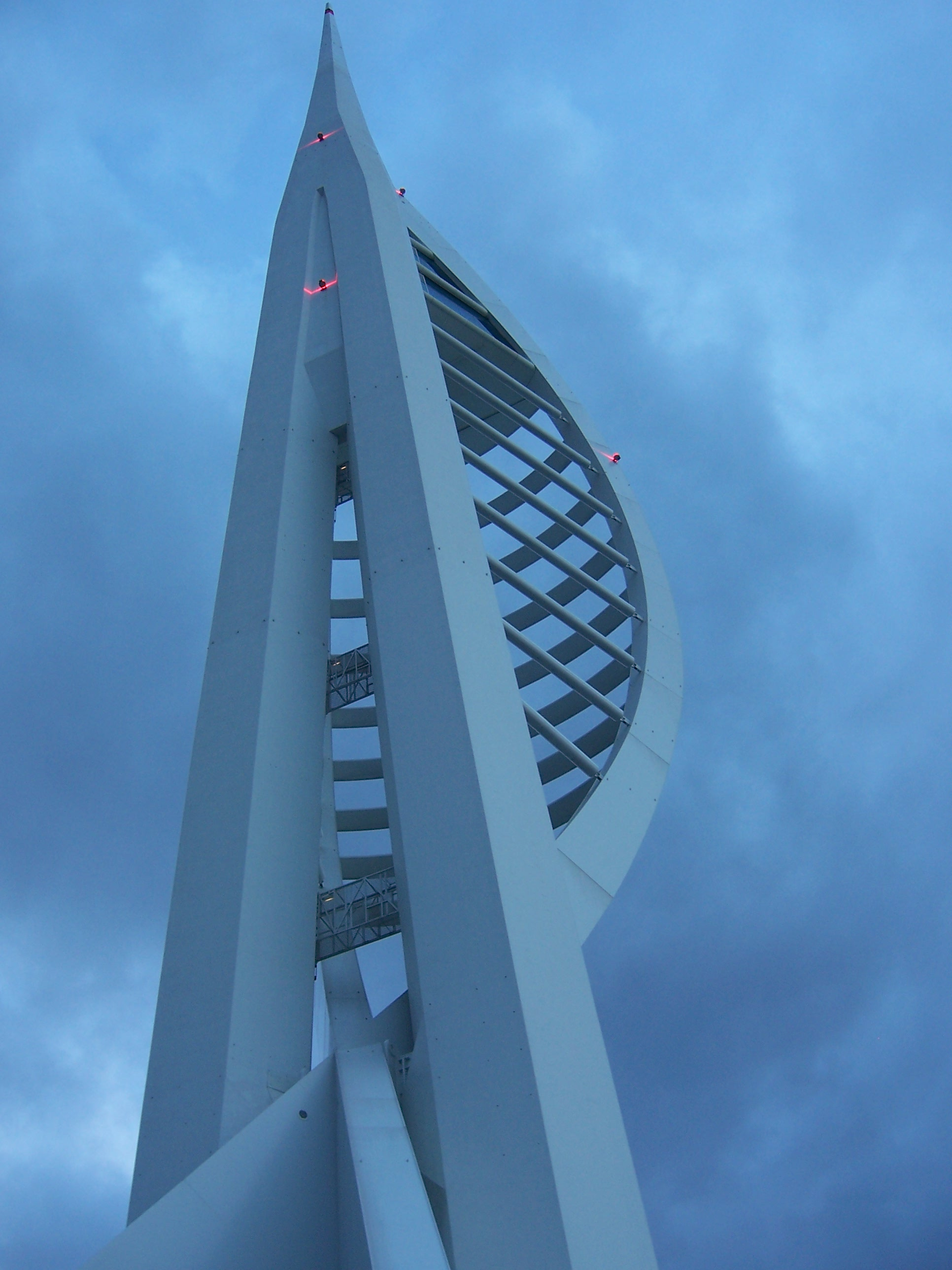
Rear view from ground level of the tower.

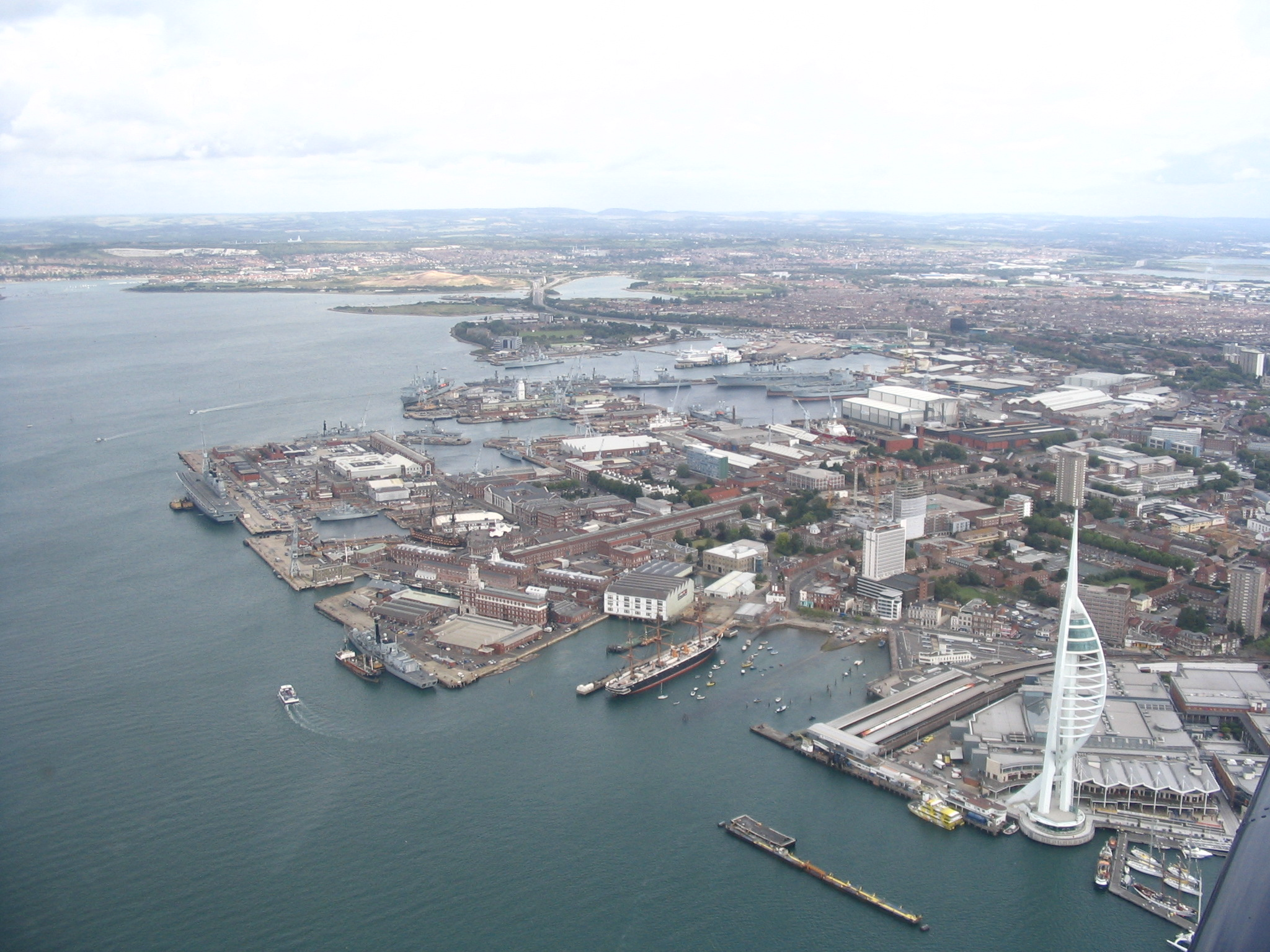
Spinnaker Tower and harbour from the air, 2007.

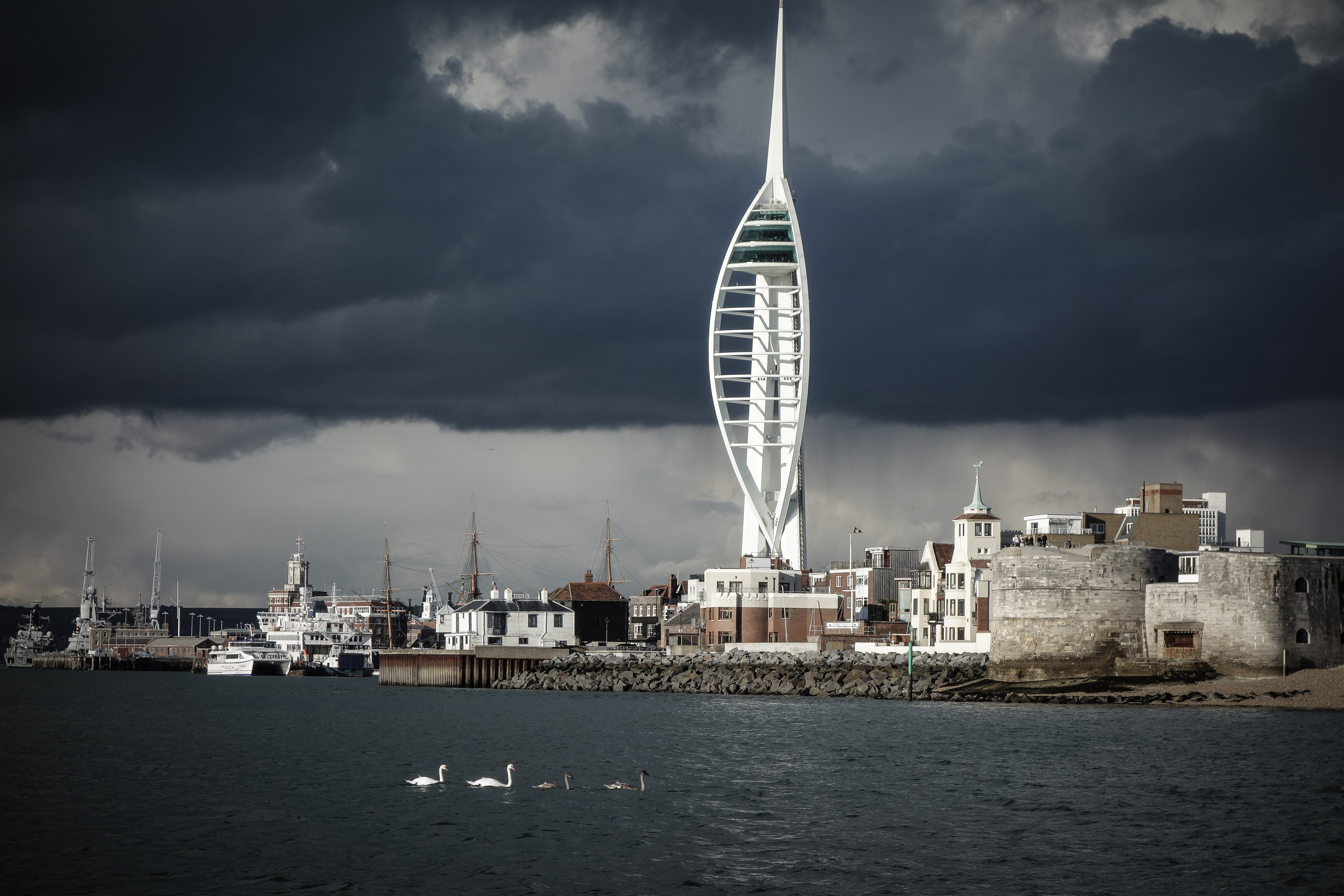
Spinnaker Tower from the water, 2012.

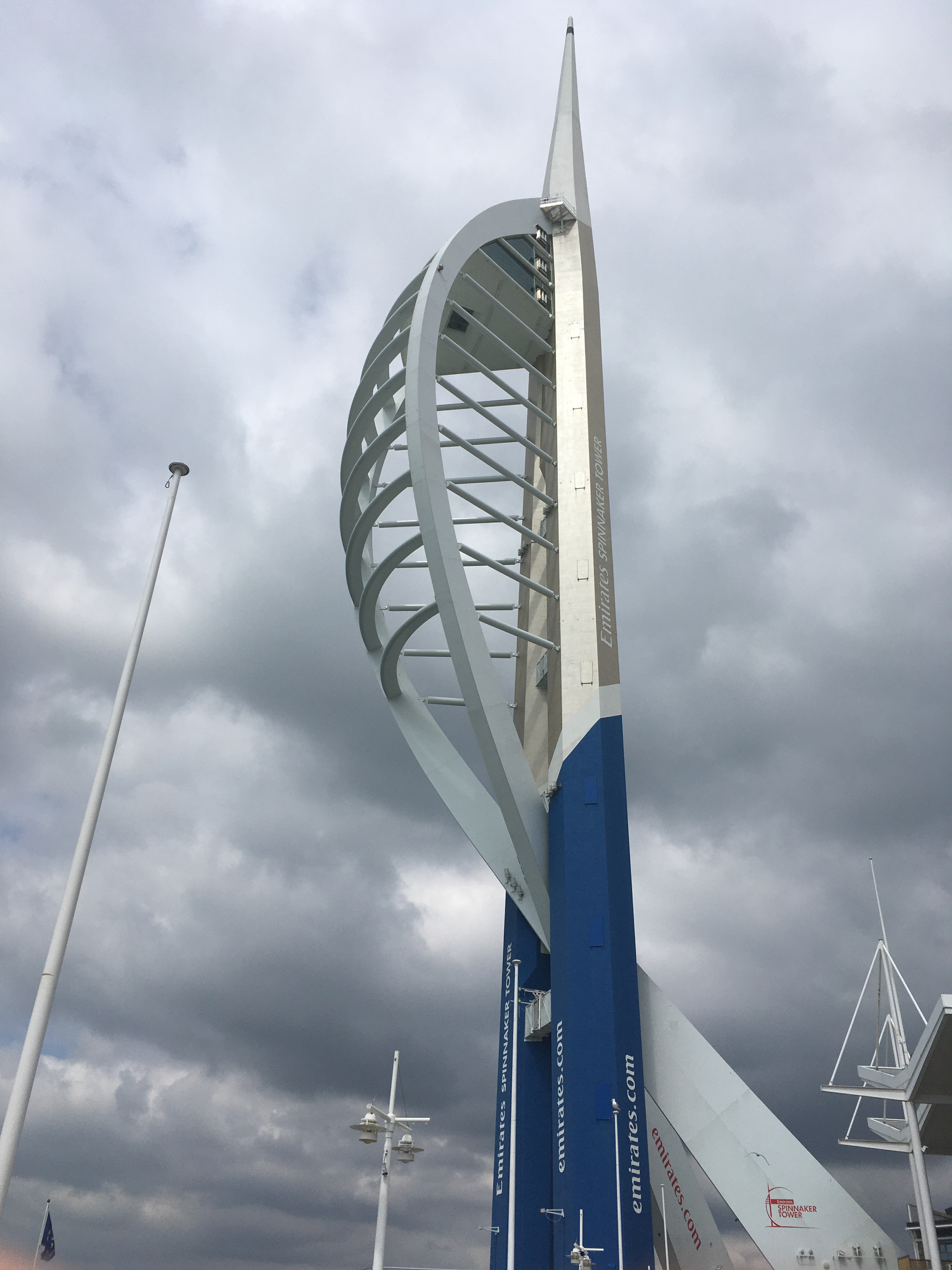
Spinnaker Tower in 2019

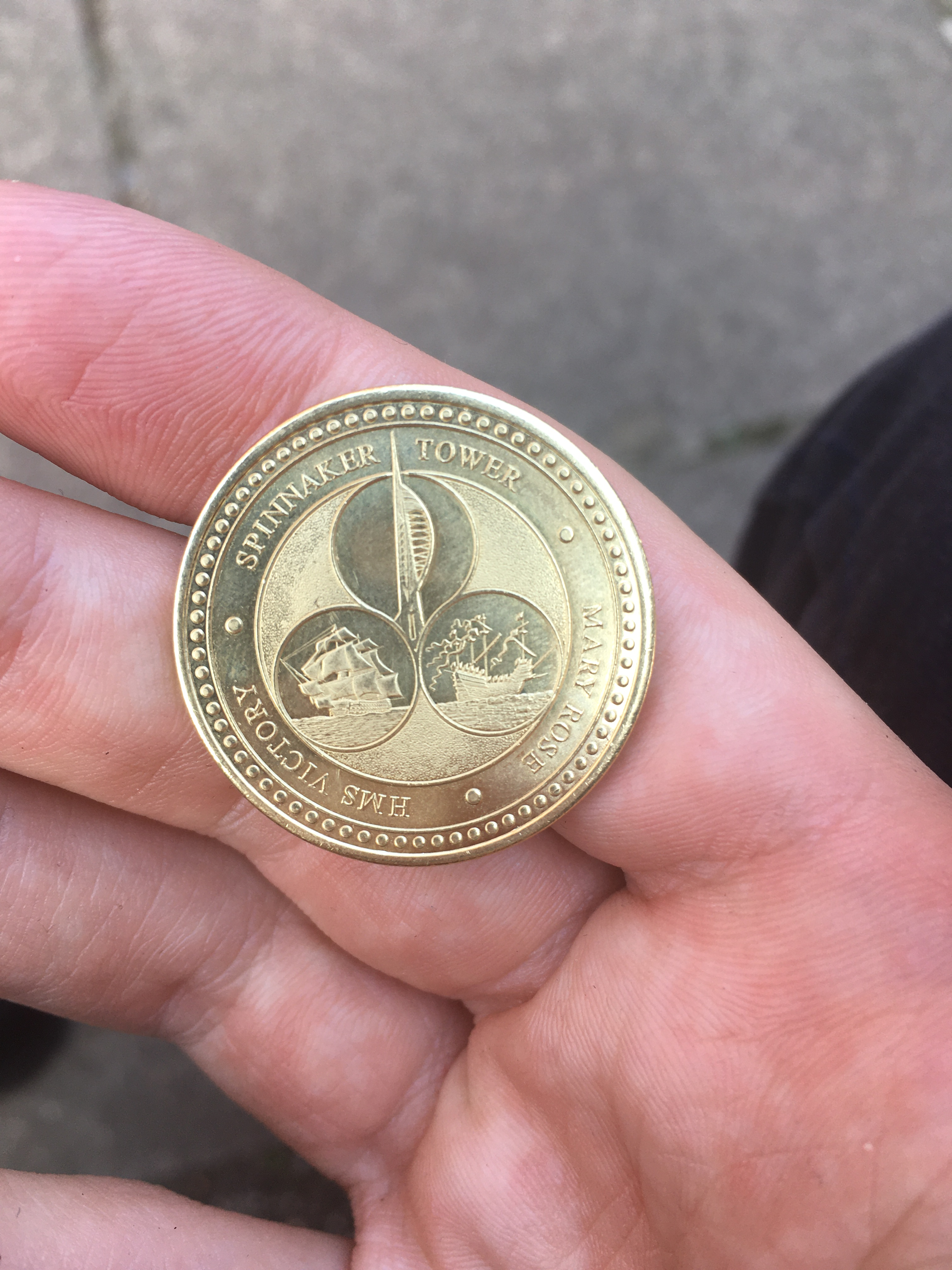
Visitors can buy a coin of their choice for £2 at the machine at the exit to the lift

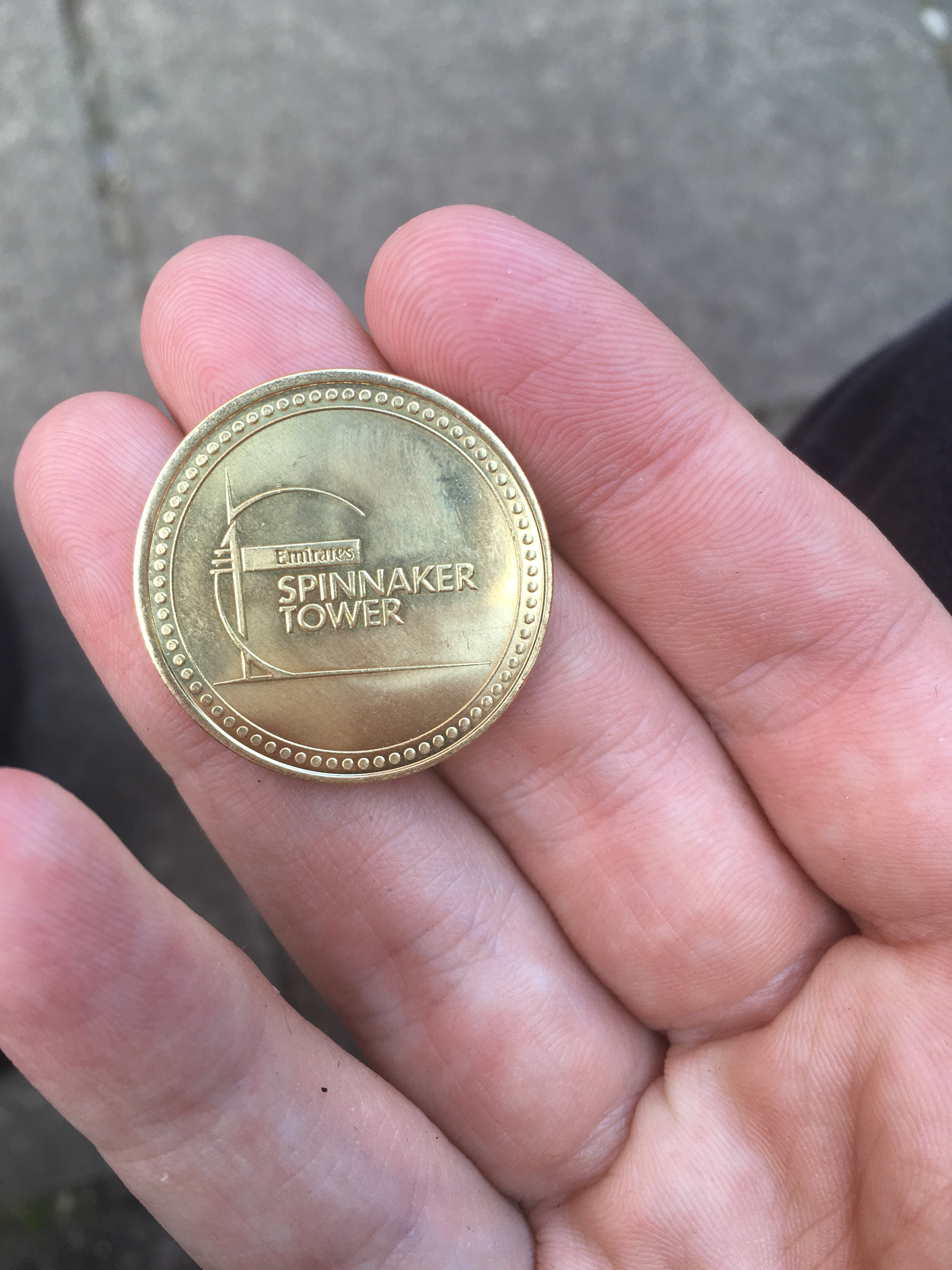
This is the back of the coin

Spinnaker Tower in 2025

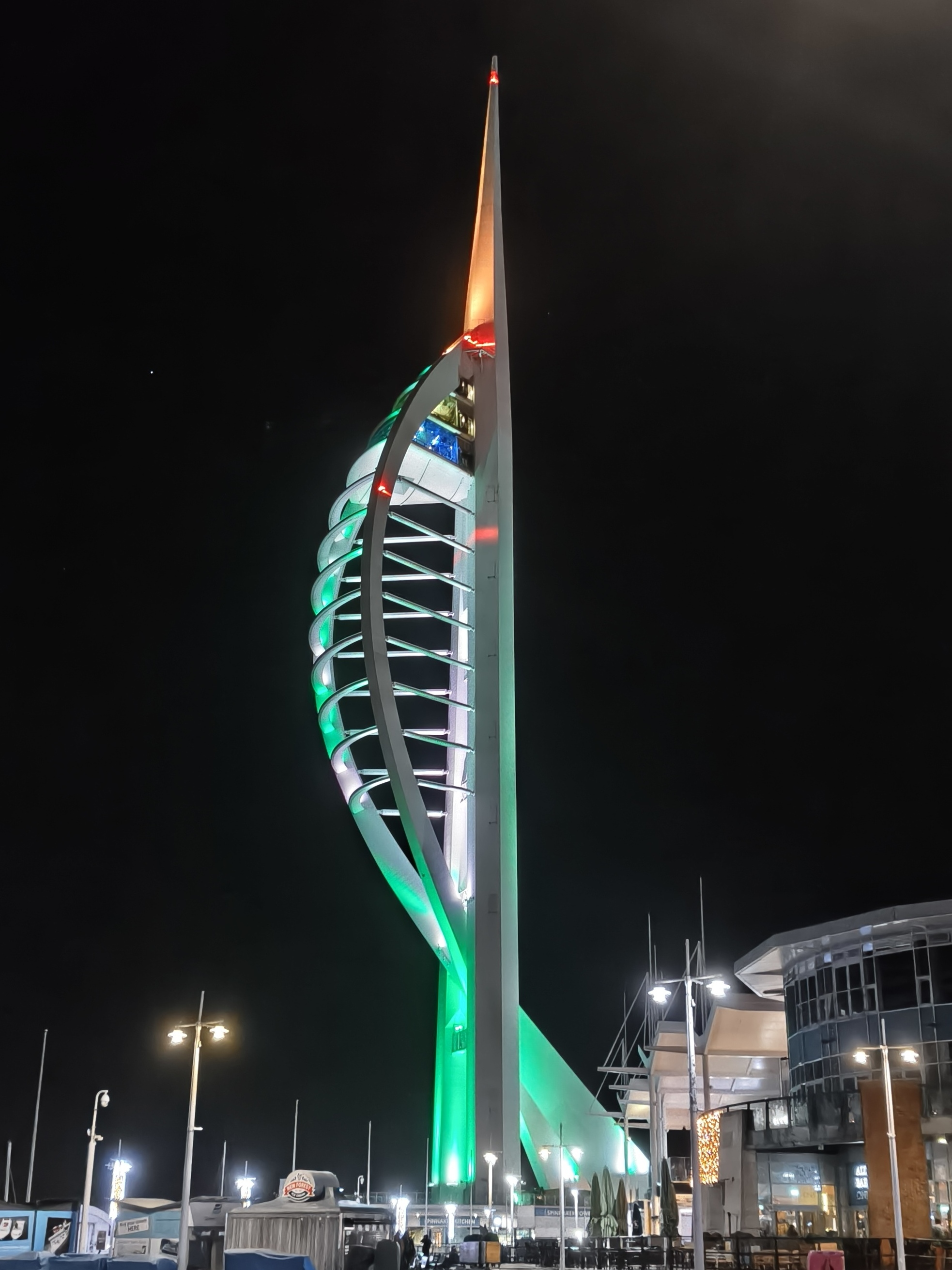
Spinnaker Tower viewed in the evening, December 2025

== Events ==
- The Magic Numbers played a live acoustic set at the Spinnaker Tower on 20 February 2007.
- The tower hosted the third of BBC Radio 1 DJ Annie Nightingale's live annual 'tower broadcasts' on 21 September 2006, featuring Santos and The Plump DJs, following similar shows from the BT Tower, London and the Television Tower, Berlin.
- Spinnaker Tower hosted one of the regional events for the BBC's Children in Need events in 2006. This involved the mascot of the event, Pudsey Bear, abseiling down the structure.
- Blue Peter recorded the 2006 Book of the Year Award inside the tower.
- Contestants on The Biggest Loser had to climb over 1,500 steps to the top of the tower as part of their weight-loss task during February 2011.
- BBC's Stargazing Live was hosted and filmed at Spinnaker Tower as part of a series of free local events in 2012.
- In 2014, Gosport MP Caroline Dinenage abseiled off the tower to raise funds for the MS Society.

== See also ==
- Burj Al Arab – similar-shaped building in Dubai, United Arab Emirates
- Glasgow Tower – similar structure in Scotland
- Vasco da Gama Tower – similar structure in Lisbon, Portugal
- Sail Tower – similar structure in Haifa, Israel
