= Magnolia globosa =

Globe magnolia

Conservation status
- Least Concern (IUCN 3.1)

Scientific classification
- Kingdom: Plantae
- Clade: Embryophytes
- Clade: Tracheophytes
- Clade: Spermatophytes
- Clade: Angiosperms
- Clade: Magnoliids
- Order: Magnoliales
- Family: Magnoliaceae
- Genus: Magnolia
- Subgenus: Magnolia subg. Magnolia
- Section: Magnolia sect. Rhytidospermum
- Subsection: Magnolia subsect. Oyama
- Species: M. globosa

Binomial name
- Magnolia globosa Hook.f. & Thomson

Synonyms
- Magnolia tsarongensis W.W.Sm. & Forrest; Oyama globosa (Hook.f. & Thomson) N.H.Xia & C.Y.Wu; Yulania japonica var. globosa (Hook.f. & Thomson) P.Parm.

Species of tree

Magnolia globosa, the globe magnolia or hen magnolia, is a species of Magnolia native to Bhutan, Tibet, southwestern China (Sichuan and Yunnan), northeastern India (Assam and Sikkim), northern Myanmar, and eastern Nepal.

== Description ==
It is a deciduous large shrub or small tree growing to 7–10 m tall. The leaves are variable in shape, obovate, elliptic-ovate or broadly ovate, 10–24 cm long and 5–14 cm broad, glossy dark green above, paler and slightly downy below, and with a bluntly acute apex. The flowers are creamy white, 6-7.6 cm wide, with the 9-12 tepals all about the same size; they are fragrant, nodding or pendent, and have a rounded, globose profile.

== Cultivation ==
It is closely related to M. wilsonii and M. sieboldii, and is rare though in cultivation. Flowers are less showy than other species in the genus, so use as a foliage plant would fit this species best.
