= Glass floor =

Flooring composed of transparent or translucent glass

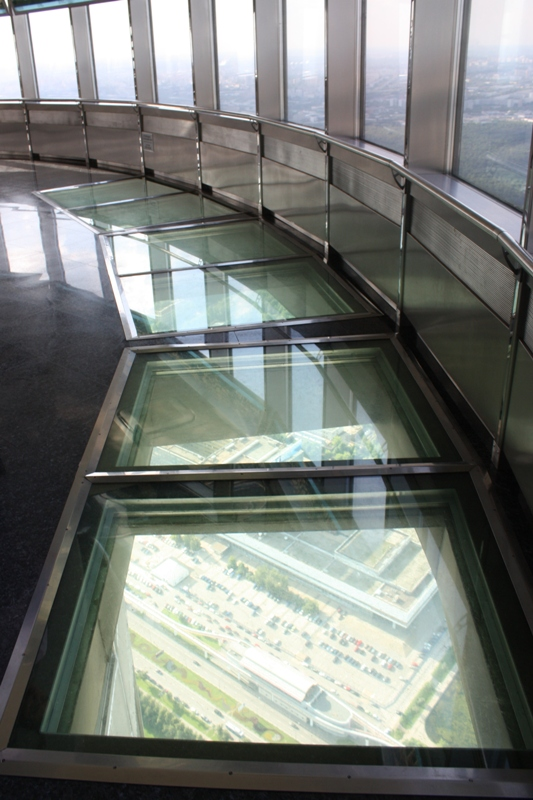
Glass floor at Ostankino Tower, Moscow, Russia

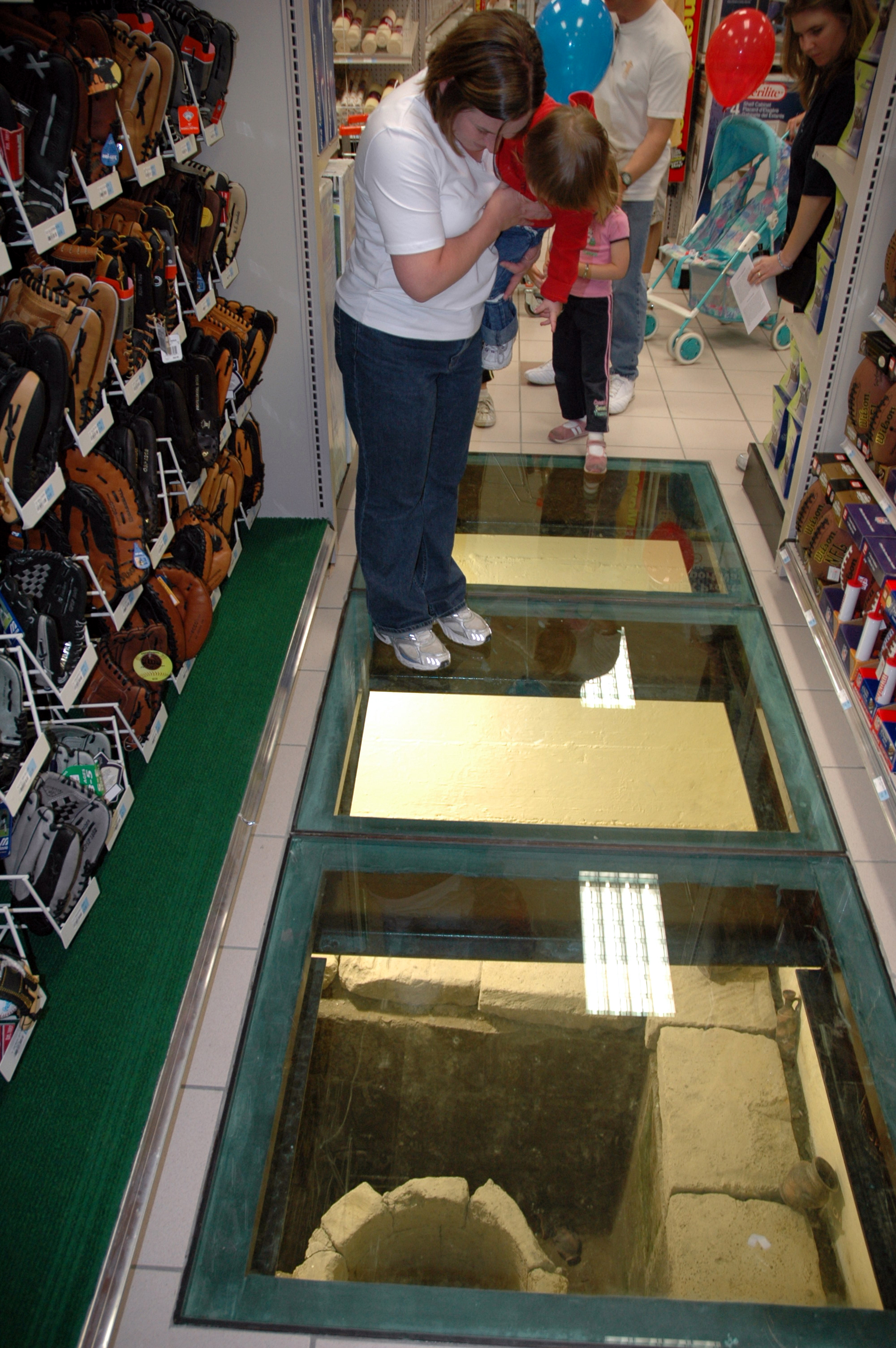
Glass in-floor display case showing Roman artifacts in Naples, Italy

Glass floors are made with transparent glass when it is useful to view something from above or below; whereas translucent glass is used when there is no need to view through. In either case, toughened glass is usually chosen, for its durability and resistance to breakage.

== Flooring ==
The glass floor is also used in general offices for design purposes.

Translucent floors are sometimes set into outdoor sidewalks and pavements, or the floors of well-lit interior spaces, to daylight the space below. These are generally called pavement lights, and have a long history.

Glass as a flooring material is used in both residential and commercial structures. Special hollow glass blocks known as '"glass pavers" are often used in combination with a metal frame. Glass floors are often lit from below with natural or artificial light, or may be treated as ordinary floor surfaces illuminated from above.

A German manufacturer of squash court floors has diversified into making glass floors for other sports, such as a glass basketball court. Their glass floors usually are translucent rather than transparent, and the line markings are indicated by illumination with LEDs below the floor.

On occasion, transparent display cases are built into the floor, such as in the Museum of Sydney in Australia, where the remains of drains and privies are shown in their original context, along with other archeological artifacts.

== Tourist attractions ==
Usually made of a toughened glass which is also laminated for structural strength, a transparent floor is most commonly used as a tourist attraction. Glass-bottom boats are popular for allowing a better view into the body of water.

At 4000 feet (1219 m), the highest glass floor above ground is the novel outdoor application of the Grand Canyon Skywalk, operated by the Hualapai Indian tribe. The highest above ground level in a freestanding structure is in Lotte World Tower in Seoul, South Korea at 1,568 feet (478 m).

In May 2014, the top layer of a glass floor spontaneously shattered in "the Ledge", a popular tourist attraction more than 1,500 feet (460 m) above street level, near the top of the Willis Tower in Chicago. Spokespersons for the architect (Skidmore, Owings & Merrill) and the tower management said that the broken glass was a protective layer, and that two other slabs of glass beneath it were strong enough to prevent anybody falling through.

Some new planetariums now feature a glass floor, which allows spectators to stand near the center of a sphere surrounded by projected images in all directions, giving the impression of floating in outer space. For example, a small planetarium at AHHAA in Tartu, Estonia features such an installation, with special projectors for images below the feet of the audience, as well as above their heads.

== Use for study ==
Scientific studies of locomotion and gait have used glass floors to enable views from all angles.

Glass floors have also been used by artists to study foreshortening. The surrealist painter Salvador Dalí had one built in his studio to help him with the dramatic perspectives in some of his artwork.

== Observatories with glass floors ==
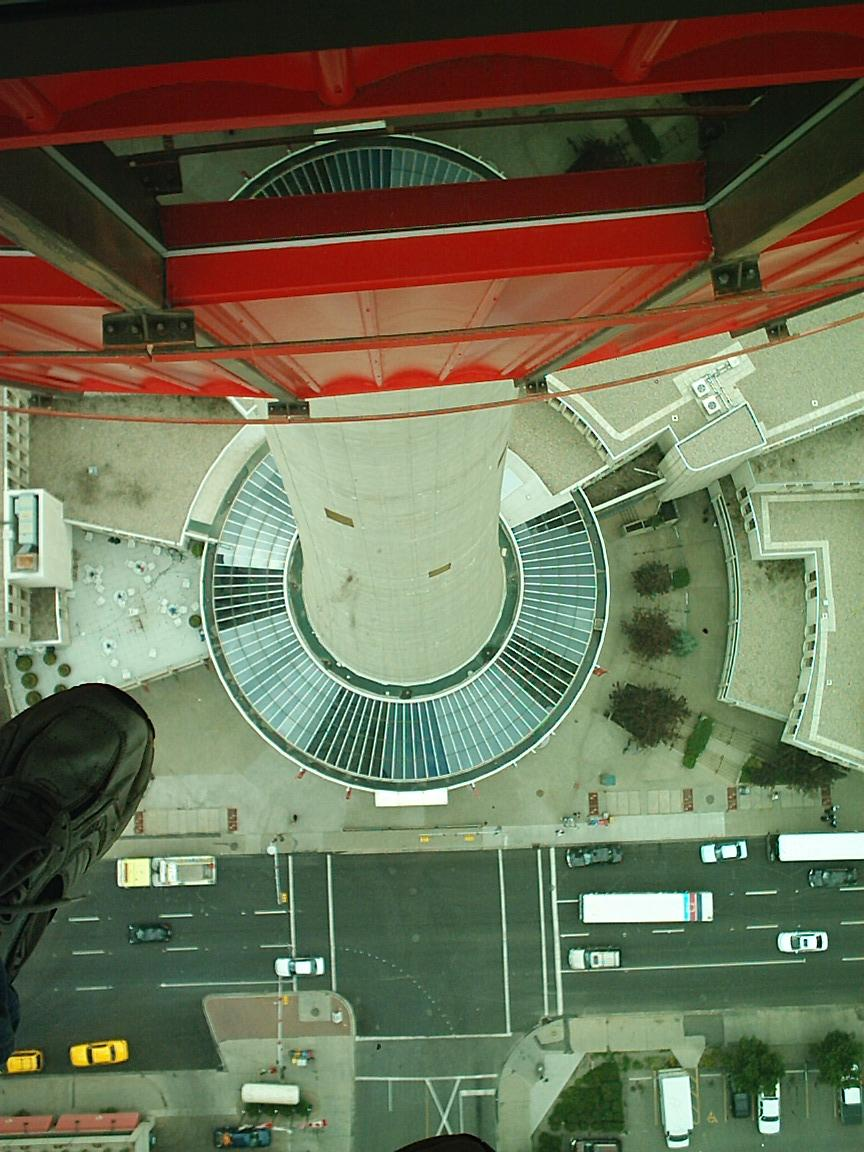
Calgary Tower, Calgary, Alberta, Canada

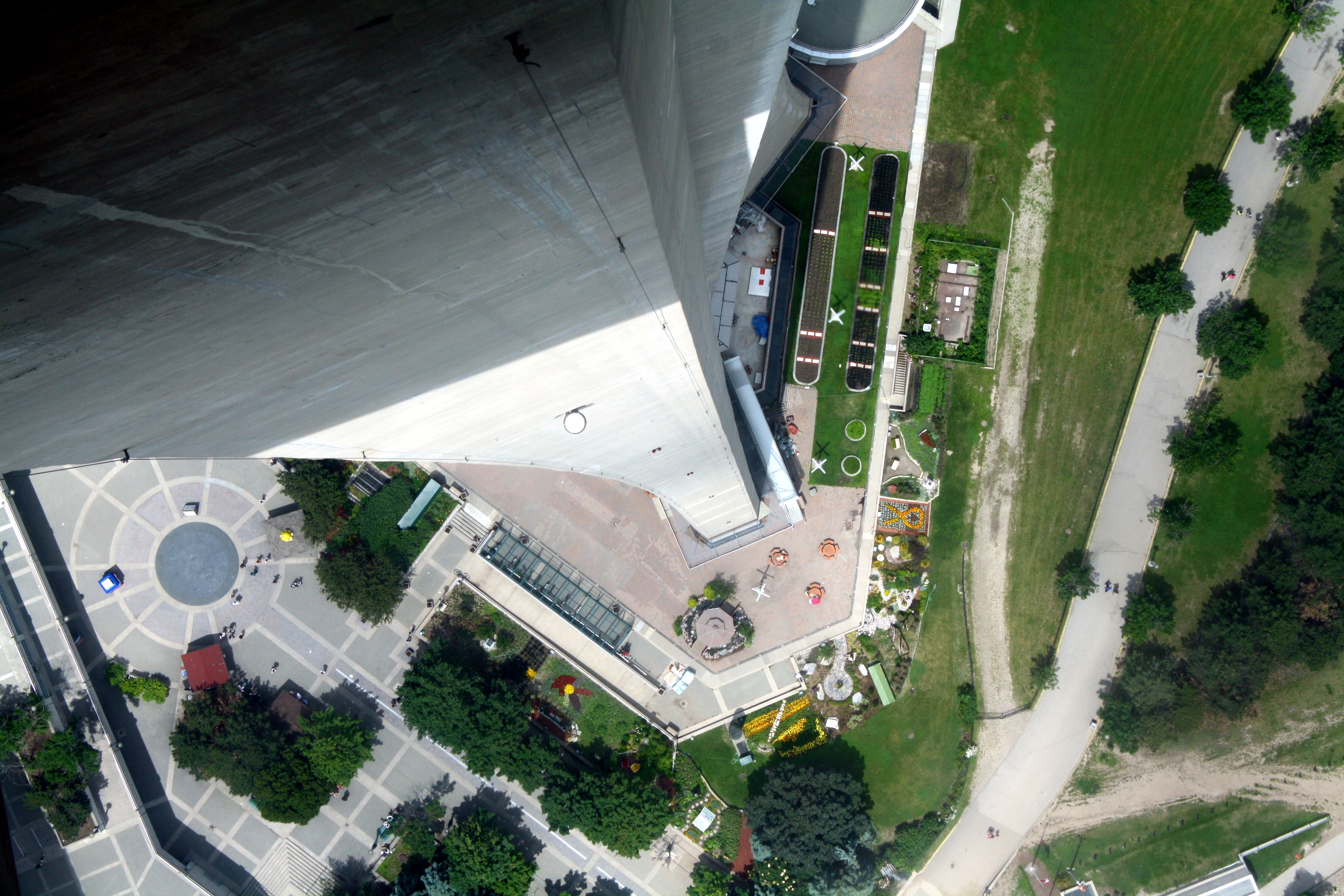
CN Tower, Toronto, Ontario, Canada

Spinnaker Tower, Portsmouth, England

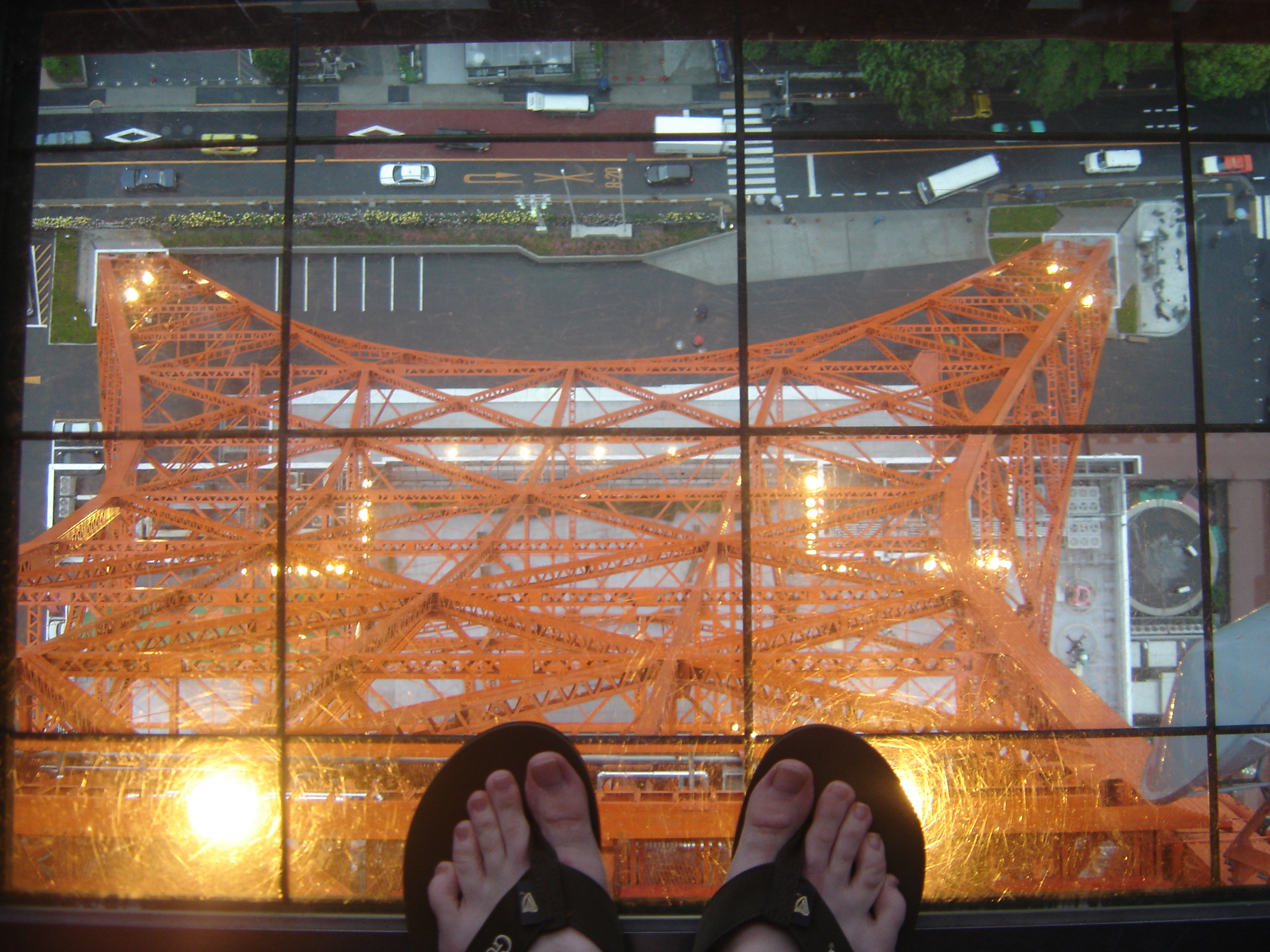
Tokyo Tower, Tokyo, Japan

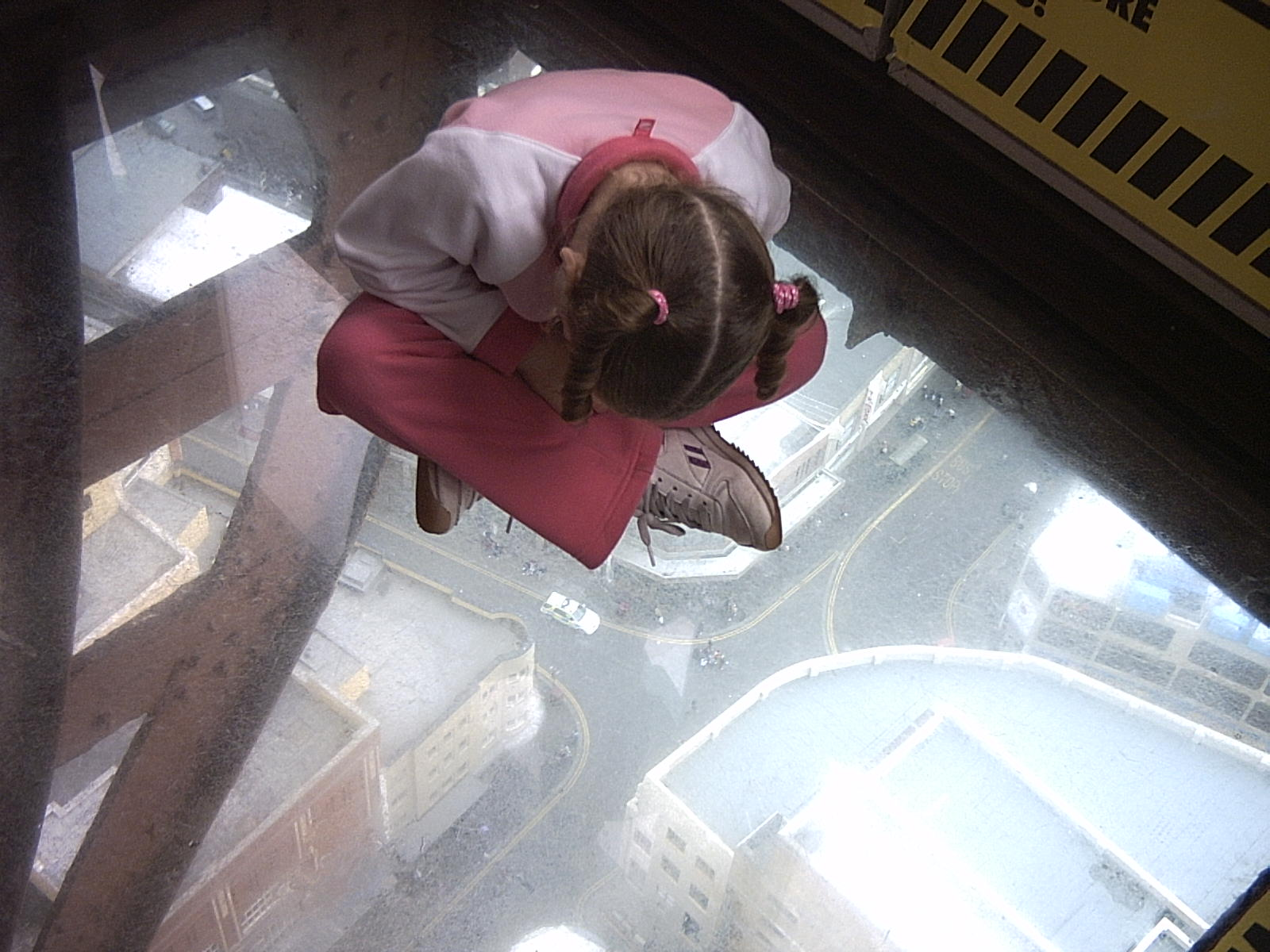
Blackpool Tower, Lancashire, England

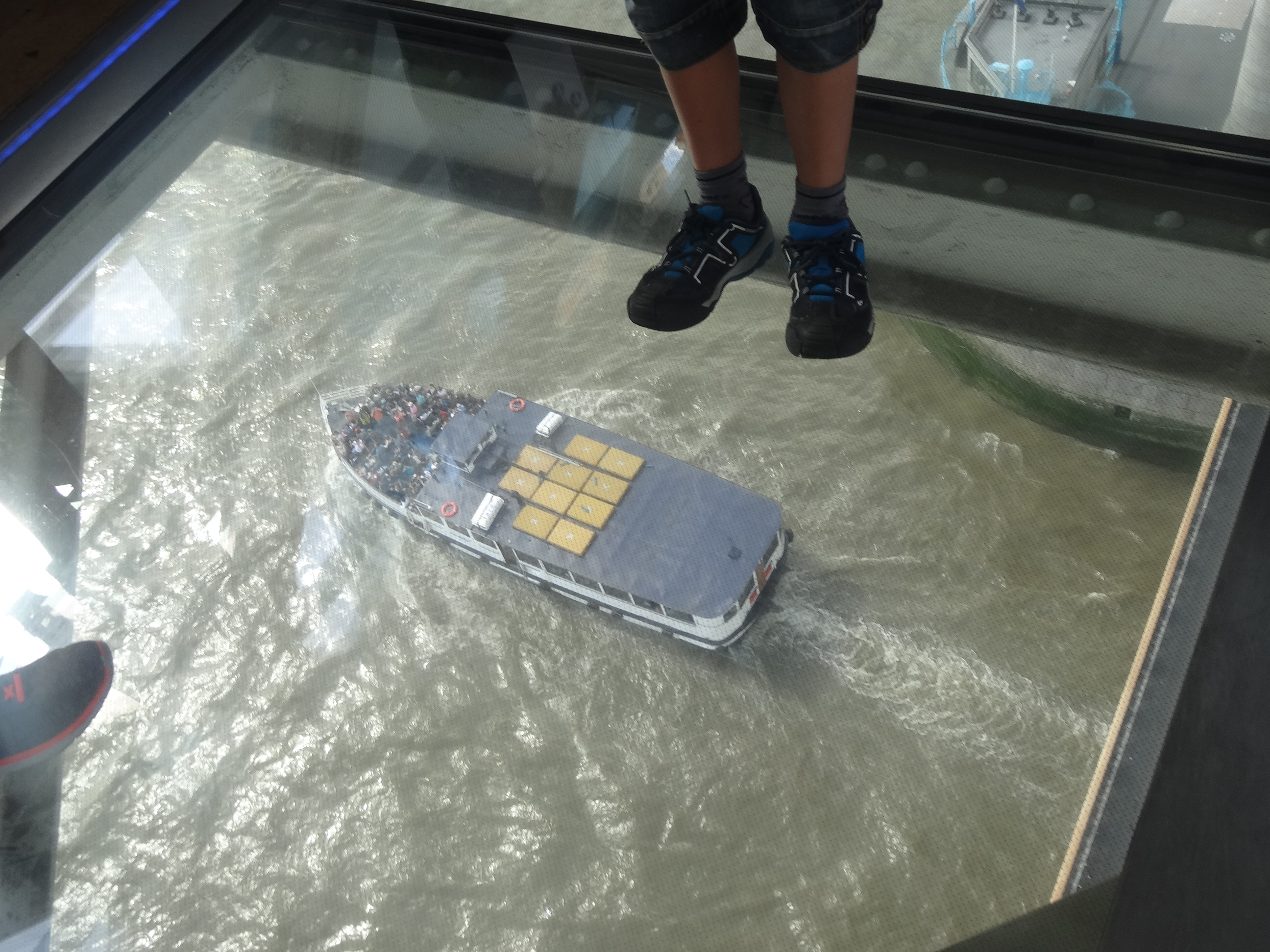
Tower Bridge, London

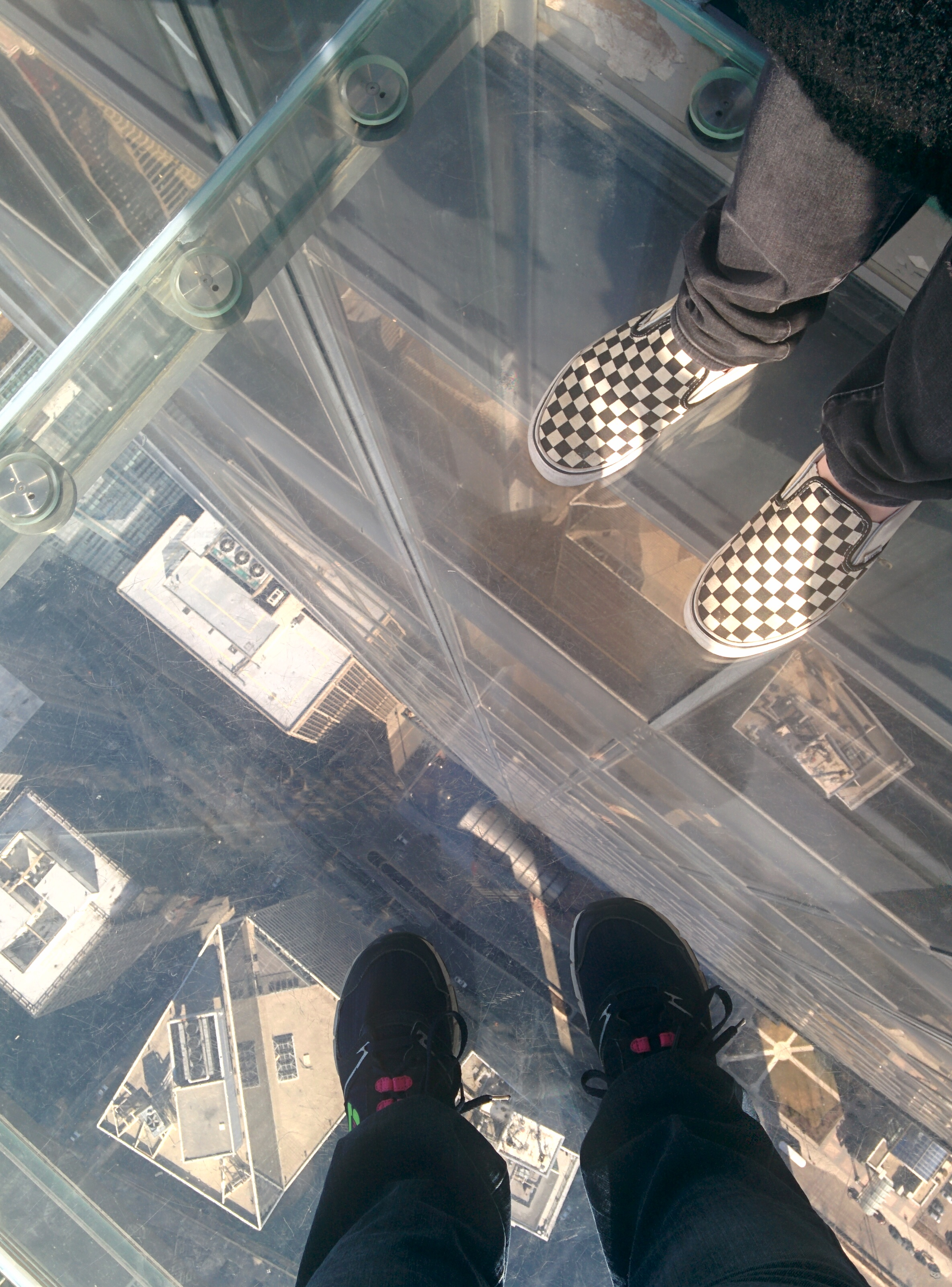
Willis Tower, Chicago
