= Frederick Claude Stern =

English botanist and horticulturalist

Sir Frederick Stern
- Born: 18 April 1884
- Died: 10 July 1967 (aged 83)
- Resting place: Golders Green Jewish Cemetery
- Occupations: horticulturist and botanist

Sir Frederick Claude Stern (18 April 1884 – 10 July 1967) was a botanist and horticulturalist, known for developing the gardens at Highdown Gardens, for creating several cultivars of garden plants and for his publications on peonies, snowdrops and gardening. He also tried to promote the interests of the Jewish community.

== Life ==
Frederick Stern was born in Knightsbridge, London, into the wealthy Stern merchant banking family, the son of James Julius Stern and Lucie Stern-Biedermann, and the brother of Henry Julius Joseph Stern, Elsa Stern, Violet Stern and Sir Albert Gerald Stern. He studied at Eton College, and at Christ Church, Oxford. He bought Highdown Gardens, an estate near Worthing, Sussex, in 1909 and lived there for the remainder of his life. In 1919 he married Sybil, daughter of Sir Arthur Lucas, a portrait painter.

== Professional career ==
Stern joined the Second Company of the London Yeomanry and served during the First World War. He was Group Commander of the West Sussex Home Guard. He was active in Gallipoli and Palestine and received the Military Cross in 1917. He eventually attained the rank of colonel. He was present at Paris Peace Conference, 1919, where he supported the British prime minister David Lloyd George as private secretary.

== Botanical and horticultural achievements ==
Stern collected plants between 1900 and 1910, working with Reginald Farrer, Frank Ludlow, Joseph Rock, and George Sherriff. In 1914 he financially participated in a plant collecting expedition by Farrer and William Purdom to Yunnan and Kansu. He cultivated some of the novelties collected in Yunnan and Gansu in his garden at Highdown. Other plant hunters sent new plants to Stern, and he acquired an extensive collection of plants from Veitch & Son in 1912. Over the years, Stern introduced many new plants to the garden and created new hybrids of Berberis, Eremurus, hellebore, lily, Magnolia, rose and snowdrop, among which Magnolia 'Highdownensis' (probable cultivar of M. wilsonii), rambler roses 'Coral' (a triploid R. sinowilsonii hybrid), 'Wedding Day' (1950, R. sinowilsonii hybrid), and Rosa ×highdownensis (1928, R. moyesii hybrid). He is also the author that first described the snowdrop Galanthus rizehensis. Herbarium specimens of some of the plants from Highdown Gardens are kept at the Natural History Museum, London.

He was awarded the Victoria Medal of Honour by the Royal Horticultural Society in 1941. In the same year, he was awarded by The British Iris Society, the Foster Memorial Plaque (named after Sir Michael Foster). He was chairman of the John Innes Horticultural Institute from 1947 to 1961, vice-president of the Royal Horticultural Society in 1962 and vice-president and treasurer of the Linnean Society from 1941 to 1958. Stern was knighted in 1956 for his services to horticulture.

Several plants species have been named in his honour, such as Buddleja sterniana (now B. crispa), Cotoneaster sternianus, Helleborus ×sternii (= H. argutifolius × H. lividus) and Paeonia sterniana.

== Publications ==
- Stern, F. C. (1946). A Study of the Genus Paeonia. Illustrated by Lilian Snelling. Royal Horticultural Society.
- The Tibetan form of Paeonia lutea (1947). Royal Horticultural Society, London
- Snowdrops and snowflakes: a study of the genera Galanthus and Leucojum (1956). Royal Horticultural Society, London, with E.A. Bowles and Margaret Stones
- A Chalk Garden (1960) Faber, London
