= Paeonia sterniana =

Scientific classification
- Kingdom: Plantae
- Clade: Tracheophytes
- Clade: Angiosperms
- Clade: Eudicots
- Order: Saxifragales
- Family: Paeoniaceae
- Genus: Paeonia
- Species: P. sterniana

Binomial name
- Paeonia sterniana H.R.Fletcher

Synonyms
- P. emodi subsp. sterniana

Species of flowering plant

Paeonia sterniana is a perennial, herbaceous peony of approximately 45 cm high in cultivation, with white or sometimes pinkish flowers. It grows in the wild in southeastern Tibet. This peony is very rare in cultivation. It produces blue seeds in autumn. Its common name in Chinese is 白花芍药 (bai hua shao yao), which means "white peony".

== Description ==
Paeonia sterniana is a hairless perennial herbaceous plant of up to 90 cm high, with leaves alternately set along the stems, which flowers in it home range in May, while the seeds are ripe as off September. It is a diploid nothospecies with ten chromosomes (2n=10), that results from hybridisation between P. lactiflora and P. mairei.

=== Root, stem and leaves ===
It has thick tapering roots, that are reminiscent of carrots and are up to 30 cm long and 1½ cm thick. The lower leaves consist of three sets of three or more leaflets, those in the middle with three main segments and each one incised, while the side leaflets have two unequal segments. The leaflets are dark green above and glaucous beneath, linear-oblong or lanceolate in shape, 5–12 cm long and 1-2½ cm wide, with a base that gradually narrows into the leaflet stalk segments, lobed or with an entire margin and a pointy tip. The number of segments and lobes may be between twenty and forty.

=== Flowers, fruits and seed ===
The flowers occur with one together at the end of the stem, are 8–10 cm in diameter, although sometimes aborted flower buds may be found in the axil of highest leaves. Each flower is subtended by three or four unequal leaflet-like bracts. Each flower has three, rarely four roundish sepals of 2-2½ × 1½-2 cm, more or less extending into a narrow tip. The white or pale pink petals have an inverted egg-shape and are about 3½ × 2 cm. Both the filaments and anthers are yellow. There is very short yellow disk which encloses the base of two to four green and hairless carpels, which are topped by white styles capped by red to purple stigmas. The carpels later develop into ovoid fruits called follicle of 2½-3 cm long and about 1 cm wide. Mature seeds are indigo-blue while the inside of the follicles is bright red.

=== Differences with related species ===
Paeonia emodi is much alike P. sterniana, having white flowers with entirely yellow stamens, and segmented leaflets. P. emodi however is with up to 1 m much taller, has only one or rarely two carpels developing per flower which are softly hairy, has several flowers per stem, and ten to fifteen segments in each lower leaf, while in P. sterniana flowers are solitary, have two to four hairless carpels and the lower leaves consist of twenty to forty segments and lobes. The seeds P. emodi ripen much later than those of P. sterniana, which are already shed in August.

== Taxonomy ==
Paeonia sterniana resulted from hybridisation between P. lactiflora and P. mairei which in the past probably were sympatric in the Himalayas, but are no longer present in the same area where P. sterniana occurs. P. sterniana was discovered for western science in 1938, by Frank Ludlow and George Taylor. Seeds were brought to the West in 1947, and subsequently cultivation started at Kew Gardens. Harold Roy Fletcher described the species in 1959. In 1997 Joseph Halda thought this taxon not worthy of full species status and reduced it to P. emodi subsp. sterniana. This view however is not supported in the most recent literature.

=== Etymology ===
The species was named in honor of Frederick Claude Stern, who supported plant hunting in China and wrote a comprehensive book on peonies.

== Distribution ==
Paeonia sterniana grows among shrubs on stony slopes, and in oak forest, between 2800–3500 m altitude, in southeastern Tibet (Tsangpo Valley), particularly in Kongbo, Tamnyen, and Gyala.

== Cultivation ==
This species is said to be easy to grow, though requiring well-drained soil, and thought to be particularly suited for rock gardens.
