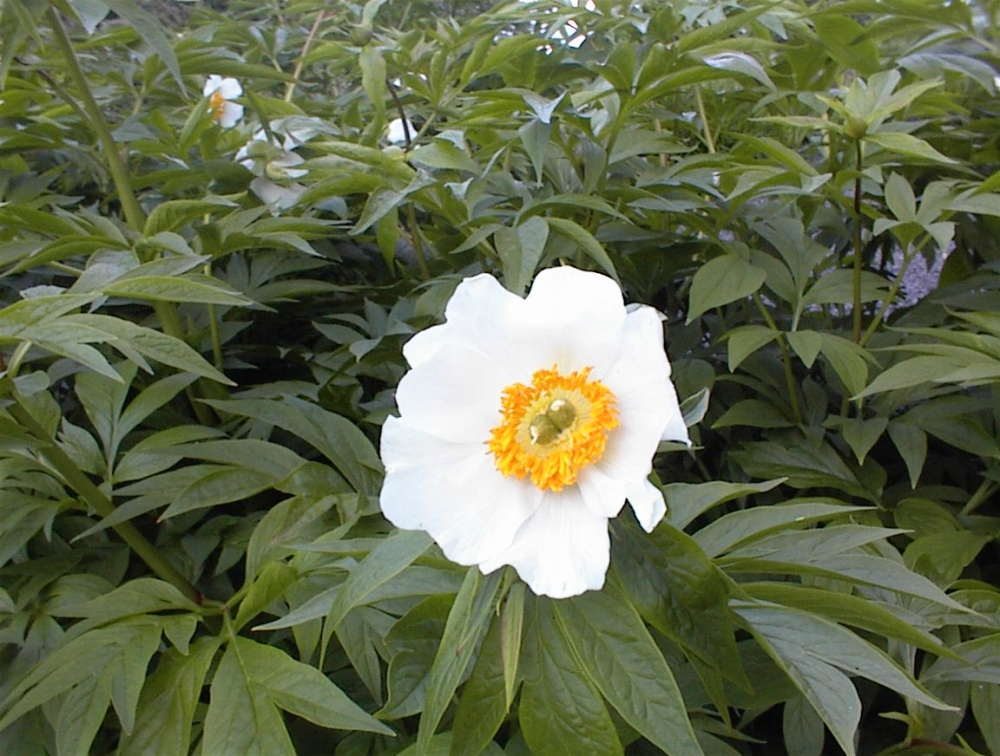

Conservation status
- Least Concern (IUCN 3.1)

Scientific classification
- Kingdom: Plantae
- Clade: Embryophytes
- Clade: Tracheophytes
- Clade: Angiosperms
- Clade: Eudicots
- Order: Saxifragales
- Family: Paeoniaceae
- Genus: Paeonia
- Species: P. emodi

Binomial name
- Paeonia emodi Wall. ex Royle

Synonyms
- P. anomala var. emodi; P. emodi forma glabrata; P. emodi var. glabrata

= Paeonia emodi =

Species of plant

Paeonia emodi is a robust herbaceous perennial plant that winters with buds underground (a hemicryptophyte), has large white flowers and large, deeply incised leaves. It belongs to the family Paeoniaceae. Its local vernacular names include mamekhor or mamekh (Punjabi), ood-e-saleeb (Urdu) meaning "with-a-cross", ood salap (Hindi), mid (in Kashmir) and 多花芍药 (duo hua shao yao) meaning "multi-flower peony" (in Chinese). In English it is sometimes called Himalayan peony. It is among the tallest of the herbaceous peony species, and, while cold-hardy, it grows better in warm, temperate climates. It is a parent of the popular hybrid 'White Innocence', which reaches 1 1/2 m.

== Description ==
The Himalayan peony is a diploid nothospecies with ten chromosomes (2n=10), that results from hybridisation between P. lactiflora and P. mairei. This large species of perennial herbaceous peony with hairless stems of 60–150 cm high, has large deep-cut leaves of 30–60 cm long, with up to fifteen hairless, lanceolate pointed leaflets or lobes of up to 14 cm. The stems may carry two to four buds, not all of which always develop into flowers of 8–12 cm in diameter in May or June. Three to six bracts which look like leaflets subtend each flower. The mostly three persistent sepals are approximately circular and convex-concave with a pointed tip. Five to ten white elliptical petals are inverted egg-shaped, 4 1/2 × 2 1/2 cm, encircle many stamens consisting of filaments of 1 1/2–2 cm long and topped by yolk yellow anthers. There is a short ring-shaped disc which encircles the very base of only one, sometimes two, pale yellow carpels, mostly covered in felty hairs. This develops into a densely hairy or hairless follicle of 2–3 1/2 cm, which contains several roundish seeds which are scarlet at first but turn brownish black if fertile in August or September.

=== Differences with related species ===
Paeonia emodi is much alike P. sterniana, having white flowers with entirely yellow stamens, and segmented leaflets. P. emodi however is with up to 1 m much taller, has only one or rarely two carpels developing per flower which are softly hairy, has several flowers per stem, and ten to fifteen segments in each lower leaf, while in P. sterniana flowers are solitary, have two to four hairless carpels and the lower leaves consist of twenty to forty segments and lobes. The seeds of P. emodi ripen much later than those of P. sterniana, which are already shed in August.

== Taxonomy ==
Paeonia emodi was first mentioned in the Numerical List of dried specimens of plants in the East India Company's Museum: collected under the superintendence of Dr. Wallich of the Company's botanic garden at Calcutta of 1831. In 1834, John Forbes Royle validated this name by publishing a proper description of the taxon. Ernst Huth reduced the taxon to P. anomala var. emodi in 1891. Joseph Dalton Hooker and Thomas Thomson distinguished a var. glabrata in the Flora of British India in 1875, a name that was to be reduced to f. glabrata by Hiroshi Hara in 1979. Recent authors do not recognise this taxon. Paeonia sterniana is sometimes regarded as a subspecies of P. emodi.

=== Etymology ===
Paeonia emodi takes its name from the Latin for Himalaya, emodi montes, where it grows in the western part of the mountain range.

== Distribution and habitat ==
This peony naturally occurs from Afghanistan and southern Tibet (Gyirong County), to western Nepal and grows at an altitude of 1800–2500 m in thickets. P. emodi is found in deciduous forests of several oak species and Quercus floribunda, most often on south facing slopes. In Uttarakhand, it occurs together with Impatiens thomsonii, I. sulcata, Erigeron multiradiatus, Viola canescens, Trifolium pratense, Pennisetum flaccidum, Murdannia divergens, Euphorbia peplus and Hemiphragma heterophyllum.

== Use ==
Paeonia emodi is used in traditional medicine in its home range to treat amongst others diarrhoea, high blood pressure, congestive heart failure, palpitation, asthma and arteriosclerosis. The parts of this plant contain chemical compounds such as triterpenes, monoterpene glucosides and phenols. Extract of the root stabilises heart beat rates, relaxes the airways and reduces blood clotting. Paeoninol and paeonin C from the fruit inhibit lipoxygenase, an enzyme that produces substances associated with asthma, inflammation, and the growth of bloodvessels in tumors. Paeoninol and paeonin C are active as antioxidant. Research illustrated that an ethanol extract of P. emodi suppressed the growth of common duckweed (50% at 50 μg/ml), and was moderately effective in killing some insects (red flour beetle). No inhibition of the growth of bacteria and fungi could be demonstrated, and no general toxicity was observed in brine shrimps, suggesting it may be safe to use.

== Cultivation ==
U.S. chemistry professor and peony breeder Arthur Percy Saunders made a cross between P. emodi and P. lactiflora that is now known as "White Innocence" (1947), an extremely tall (up to 1.5 m), richly flowering and well-known cultivar.
