= Glass basketball court =

Type of basketball court

A glass basketball court is a basketball court with a glass floor that uses light emitting diodes (LEDs) to display the court lines and other graphics.

== History ==
ASB GlassFloor, a German manufacturer, first demonstrated a glass court for sports including basketball in 2011. Its first installation was for a 3x3 basketball event in Berlin in 2014. The company makes two different kinds of glass floor that are approved by FIBA for tier 1 competitions: ASB MultiSports, which offers LED lines, and ASB LumiFlex, which allows full motion video and player tracking. The LumiFlex option can display statistics and advertising for spectators in the arena in ways comparable to digital on-screen graphics on television broadcasts.

In 2017, FIBA had allowed another manufacturer to supply LED-lined glass floors for tier 2 and tier 3 competitions, noting that it passed the association's requirements for player and ball reaction against the surface, and avoided the redundant lines on many existing multi-use courts. After successful trials, FIBA approved glass courts on October 1, 2022, for tier-1 competitions such as the FIBA Basketball World Cup, and a glass court would be used for the first time during the 2023 FIBA Under-19 Women's Basketball World Cup in Madrid.

In 2014, Nike developed a glass court with AKQA, Rhizomatiks and WiSpark for an exhibition in Shanghai. The company invited 30 players to practice with Kobe Bryant on the court, nicknamed the "House of Mamba". The custom court included motion tracking and lighting that could track players as they ran drills.

Glass courts are installed in several European basketball arenas, including the BallsportArena Dresden, the OYM Performance Center in Switzerland, and an arena at the University of Oxford. Two professional European basketball teams permanently installed ASB GlassFloor courts in their arenas in 2024. FC Bayern Munich installed a LumiFlex LED court at its home arena, BMW Park. Panathinaikos B.C. also installed a LumiFlex court at their home, Telekom Center, in Athens.

In February 2024 during the NBA All-Star Weekend, the NBA held the Saturday night activities, including the skills challenge, on a glass court at Lucas Oil Stadium. The All-Star Game proper was played at Gainbridge Fieldhouse, on a traditional court.

In March 2026, the Big 12 Conference in U.S. college basketball installed an ASB floor at T-Mobile Center in Kansas City, Missouri for its women's and men's conference tournaments, becoming the United States' first non-exhibition basketball competition to utilize the technology.

== Reception ==
Glass basketball courts have faced a mixed reception from players due to their different feel in comparison to wooden courts. During the Big 12 conference tournaments in 2026, players complained that the surface felt more slippery than usual, while some considered the LED screen to be distracting (with one player reporting that it gave him a migraine). Some players were more positive; Baylor player Cameron Carr noted that the court "[felt] good to jump on [and] doesn't hurt your legs as much", while Big 12 commissioner Brett Yormark remarked during a press conference that "every official last week came up to me and said, Brett, this is going to help me if we ever play on this court again. It's going to help me prolong my career because it's providing them some shock absorption for their knees." On March 12, 2026, during a men's quarter-final game, Texas Tech player Christian Anderson Jr. strained his groin after slipping on the court; the following day, the Big 12 announced that it would revert to a wooden court for the tournament semi-finals, citing feedback from players and coaches.

As of June 2022, a MultiSports floor costs about US$80–90 per square foot and a LumiFlex floor costs about US$500 per square foot; a full NBA court with LumiFlex technology would cost about US$2 million, leading to doubt about its viability for widespread adoption.
