= Basketball court =

Rectangular playing surface, with baskets at each end

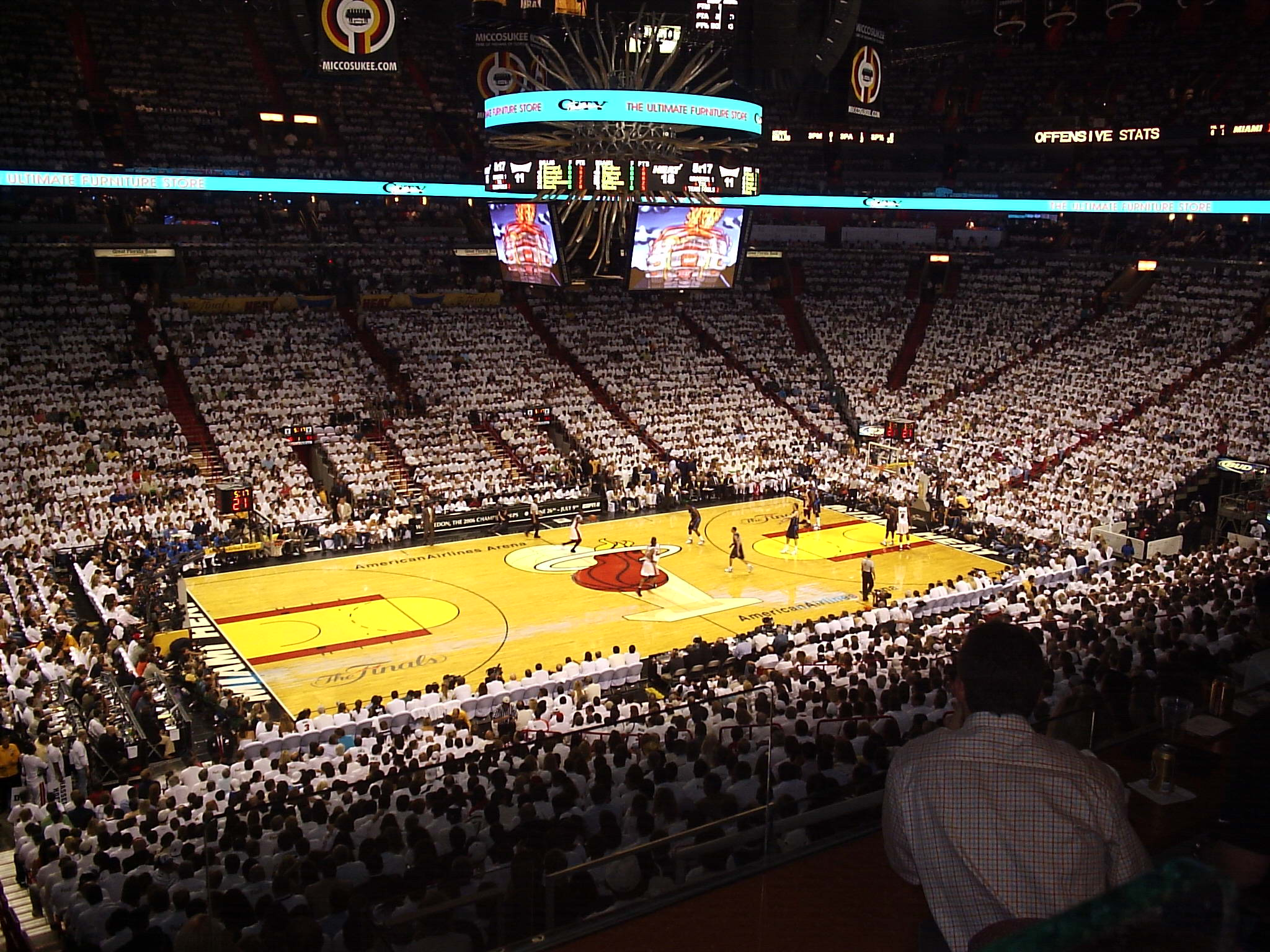
The home court of the Miami Heat of the National Basketball Association.

In basketball, the basketball court is the playing surface, consisting of a rectangular floor, with baskets at each end. Indoor basketball courts are almost always made of polished wood, usually maple, with 10 feet (3.048 m)-high rims on each basket. Outdoor surfaces are generally made from standard paving materials such as concrete or asphalt. International competitions may use glass basketball courts.

== Dimensions ==
Basketball courts come in many different sizes. In the National Basketball Association (NBA), the court is 94 by 50 feet (28.7 by 15.2 m). Under International Basketball Federation (FIBA) rules, the court is slightly smaller, measuring 28 by 15 meters (91.9 by 49.2 ft). In amateur basketball, court sizes vary widely. Many older high school gyms were 84 feet (26 m) or even 74 feet (23 m) in length. The baskets are always 10 feet (3.05 m) above the floor (except possibly in youth competition).

Basketball courts have a three-point arc at both baskets. A basket made from beyond this arc is worth three points; a basket made from within this line, or with a player's foot touching the line, is worth 2 points. The free-throw line, where one stands while taking a foul shot, is located within the three-point arc at 15 feet from the plane of the backboard. A foul shot is worth 1 point, but if a shot is made from the foul line while in play it is still worth 2 points.

=== Table ===
Area	NBA		FIBA		WNBA		NCAA (Note: NCAA Division I men's play used these dimensions in the 2019–20 season, with Divisions II and III adopting them for the 2020–21 season. Women's play in all divisions adopted this distance in 2021–22.)	
	Imperial/US	Metric	Imperial/US	Metric	Imperial/US	Metric	Imperial/US	Metric
Court length	94 ft	28.65 m	91.86 ft	28 m	Same as NBA			
Court width	50 ft	15.24 m	49.21 ft	15 m	Same as NBA			
Rim height	10 ft	3.05 m	Same as NBA					
No Charge Zone arc	4 ft	1.22 m	4.10 ft	1.25 m	Same as NBA		Men: Same as NBA	
No Charge Zone arc	4 ft	1.22 m	4.10 ft	1.25 m	Same as NBA		Women: 9 in	22.9 cm
Center circle diameter	12 ft	3.66 m	11.81 ft	3.6 m	Same as NBA			
3-point line distance from the basket	23.75 ft 22 ft in corner (Note: The NBA three-point line is 3 ft (0.91 m) from the sideline in a zone starting at the baseline and ending when it crosses the 23.75 feet (7.24 m) arc. The 22-foot (6.71 m) distance exists only at the points on the three-point line that are directly to the left and right of the basket center.)	7.24 m 6.70 m in corner	22.15 ft 21.65 ft in corner (Note: The FIBA three-point line is 2.95 feet (0.90 m) from the sideline in a zone starting at the baseline and ending when it crosses the 22.1 feet (6.7 m) arc. The 21.65-foot (6.60 m) distance exists only at the points on the three-point line that are directly to the left and right of the basket center.)	6.75 m 6.60 m in corner	Main arc same as FIBA; Corners same as NBA		Same as FIBA (Note: The NCAA three-point line is the same distance from the center of the basket as the FIBA line, but is 3.33 feet (1.01 m) from the sideline in the corners because the NCAA court is wider.)	
Key (shaded lane or restricted area) width	16 ft	4.88 m	16.08 ft	4.9 m	Same as NBA		12 ft	3.66 m
Free-throw line distance from point on the floor directly below the backboard	15 ft	4.57 m	15.09 ft	4.6 m	Same as NBA			
Diagram								

== Sections ==
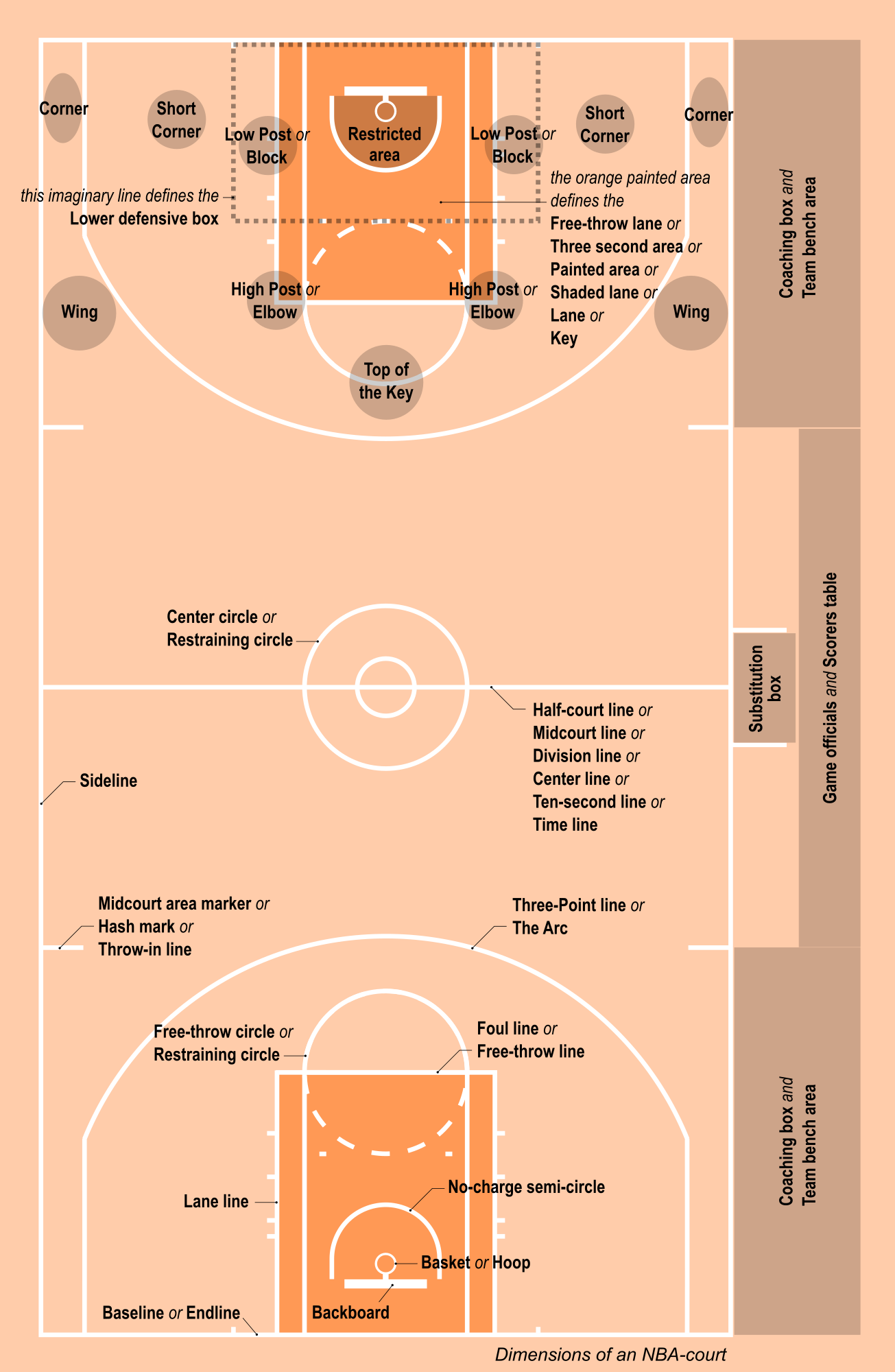
Most important terms related to the basketball court

=== Center circle ===
The only two players permitted to enter this area prior to the tipoff are the players contesting the jump ball (usually but not always centers). Both players jump when the referee throws the ball in the air, each attempting to tap the ball into the hands of a player of their own team.

=== Three-point line ===
The three-point line is the line that separates the two-point area from the three-point area; any shot made beyond this line counts as three points. If the shooting player steps on the line, it is counted as two points. Any foul made in shooting beyond the three-point line would give the player three free throws if the shot does not go in, and one if it does.

The distance to the three-point line from the center of the basket varies depending on the level or league, and has changed several times. These are the current distances, with the league or level using each distance:

- 19.75 ft (6.02 m): High schools (US)
- 21.65 ft (6.60 m) to 22.15 ft (6.75 m): FIBA and NCAA
- 22 ft (6.71 m) to 22.15 ft (6.75 m): WNBA
- 22 ft (6.71 m) to 23.75 ft (7.24 m): NBA

The NBA adopted the three-point line at the start of the 1979–80 season. This is of variable distance, ranging from 22 feet (6.7 m) in the corners to 23.75 feet (7.24 m) behind the top of the key. During the 1994–95, 1995–96, and 1996–97 seasons, the NBA attempted to address decreased scoring by shortening the overall distance of the line to a uniform 22 feet (6.7 m) around the basket. It was moved back to its original distance after the 1996–97 season. FIBA and the NCAA both adopted the three-point line in 1986.

Most high school associations in the USA have a distance of 19.75 feet. This was formerly the distance for college basketball. On May 26, 2007, the NCAA playing rules committee agreed to move the three-point line back one foot to 20.75 feet for the men. This rule went into effect for the 2008–2009 season. The three-point line for women (NCAA) moved back one foot to 20.75 feet at the start of the 2011–12 season. During the 2019 offseason, the NCAA men's playing rules committee adopted the FIBA arc in a two-phase implementation. Division I adopted the new arc in 2019–20, and other NCAA divisions did so in 2020–21. The NCAA women's arc was moved to the FIBA arc in 2021–22.

The international distance, used in most countries outside the USA, as well as in FIBA and NCAA competition, is currently 6.6 m (21.65 ft) to 6.75 m (22.15 ft). The WNBA uses FIBA's arc except in the corner area, where the minimum distance is the NBA standard of 22 ft (6.71 m).

=== Perimeter ===
The perimeter is defined as the areas outside the free throw lane and inside the three-point line. Shots converted (successfully made) from this area are called "perimeter shots" or "outside shots" as called during older NBA games. If a player's foot is on the three-point line, the shot is considered a perimeter shot.

=== Low post area ===
The low post is defined as the areas closest to the basket but outside of the free throw lane. This area is fundamental to strategy in basketball. Skilled low post players can score many points per game without ever taking a jump shot.

=== Key ===
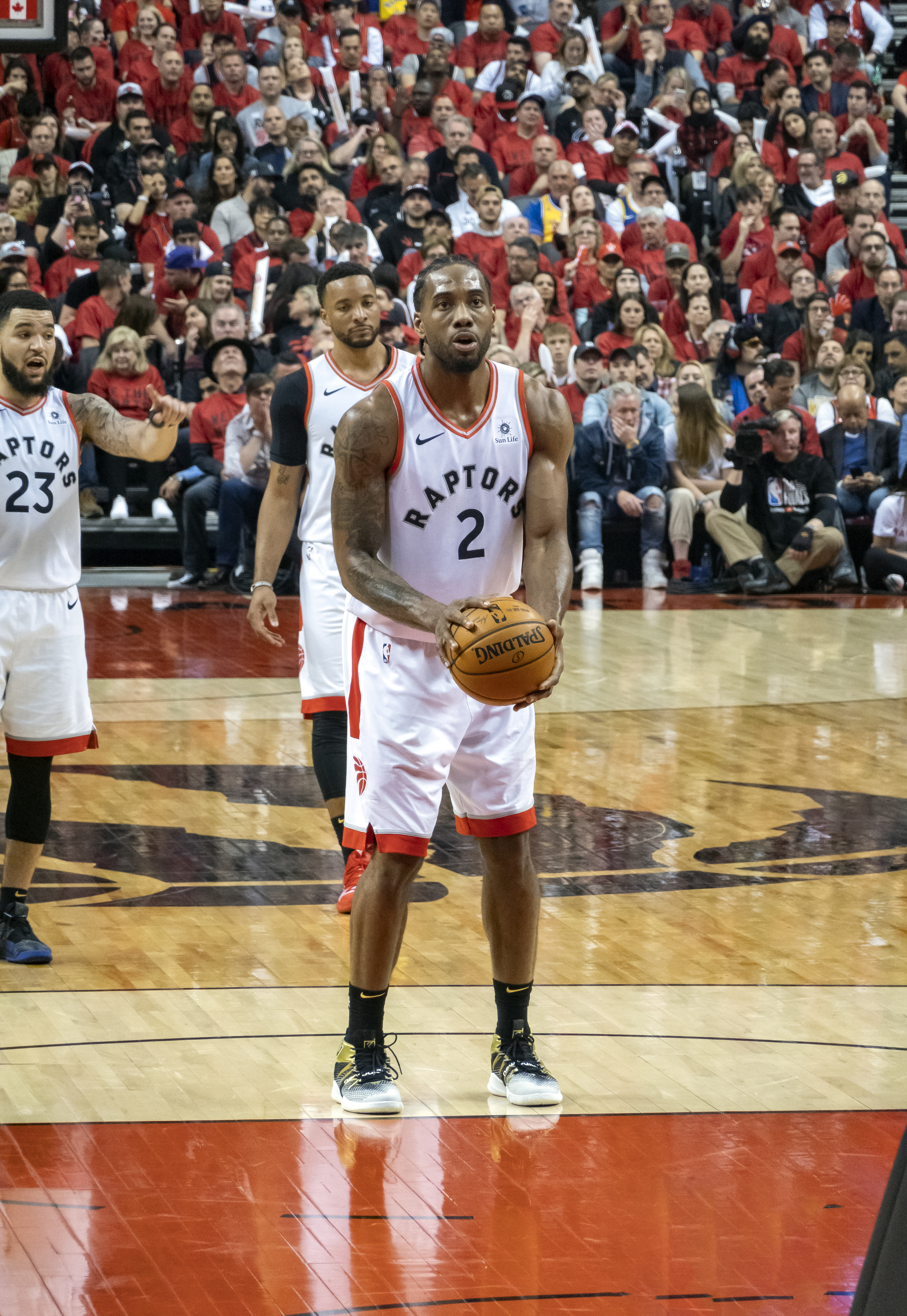
Kawhi Leonard at the free throw line during Game 2 of the 2019 NBA Finals.

The key, free throw lane or shaded lane refers to the usually painted area beneath the basket; for the NBA, it is 16.02 feet (wider for FIBA tournaments). Since October 2010, the FIBA-spec key has been a rectangle 4.9 m wide and 5.8 m long. Previously, it was a trapezoid 3.7 meters (12 ft) wide at the free-throw line and 6 meters (19 feet and 6.25 inches) at the end line; the NBA and U.S. college basketball has always used a rectangle key.

The key is primarily used to prevent players from staying beneath the basket of the opponents' team for long periods (maximum three seconds).

The no charge zone arc is a semi-circular arc drawn around the area directly underneath the basket. With some exceptions, members of the defending team cannot draw charging fouls in this area. The no charge zone arc in almost all North American rule sets above high school level (NCAA men's, NBA, and WNBA) has a radius 4 feet (1.22 m) from below the center of the basket. FIBA uses a marginally larger radius of 1.25 m (4 ft 1.2 in). Starting with the 2023–24 season, NCAA women's basketball reduced the size of the no-charge arc to a radius of 9 inches (22.86 cm)—in other words, the size of the basket. The no charge zone arc rule first appeared at any level of basketball in the NBA in the 1997–98 season. The NCAA restricted area arc was originally established for the 2011–12 men's and women's seasons at a 3-foot (0.91 m) radius from below the center of the basket, and was extended to match the 4-foot radius for the 2015–16 season and beyond. NCAA men's basketball still uses the 4-foot radius.

=== Baseline ===
The baseline or endline is the boundary line running the end of the court, and usually measures 50 feet long. Inbounds passes after made baskets are taken from the baseline.

=== Other lines ===
On NBA floors, two hash marks are drawn at the end lines near the key to mark the area known as the lower defensive box. A defensive player is allowed to draw a charging foul within the restricted arc if the offensive player receives the ball and/or starts his drive within this area.

Also, two lines are drawn on each of the sidelines, 28 feet from each of the endlines, which designates the extent of the coaching box and bench. This line marks the farthest extent a coach (aside from the sidelines) can stand. Directly behind this area is the team bench.

On the half-court line of NBA floors two lines extend outside the playing court, designating the place where substitutes wait before they can enter the playing court; directly behind this area are the various off-court officials such as the timekeeper and reserve referee.

=== FIBA changes ===
The FIBA key was changed in 2010 to more closely match the NBA key.

On April 26, 2008, FIBA announced several major rules changes involving the court markings. These changes took effect for major international competitions on October 1, 2010, after that year's World Championships for men and women, and became mandatory for other competitions on October 1, 2012 (although national federations could adopt the new markings before 2012). The changes were as follows.

- The shape of the key changed from a trapezoid to a rectangle as it is in the NBA, with NBA dimensions.
- The three-point line moved back to 6.75 meters (22 ft 1.7 in) from 6.25 meters (20 ft 6.1 in), compared to 23 ft 9 in (7.24 m) for the NBA at the top of the arc.
- The FIBA adopted the NBA's restricted area arc with a marginally wider radius of 1.25 meters (4 ft 1.2 in).
Historic basketball courts

1892

1892

1897

1952

1956

1961

1965

1984-1988

== See also ==
- NBA records
