= Highdown Gardens =

Gardens in Worthing, West Sussex, England

Coordinates: 50.8255°N 0.4428°W

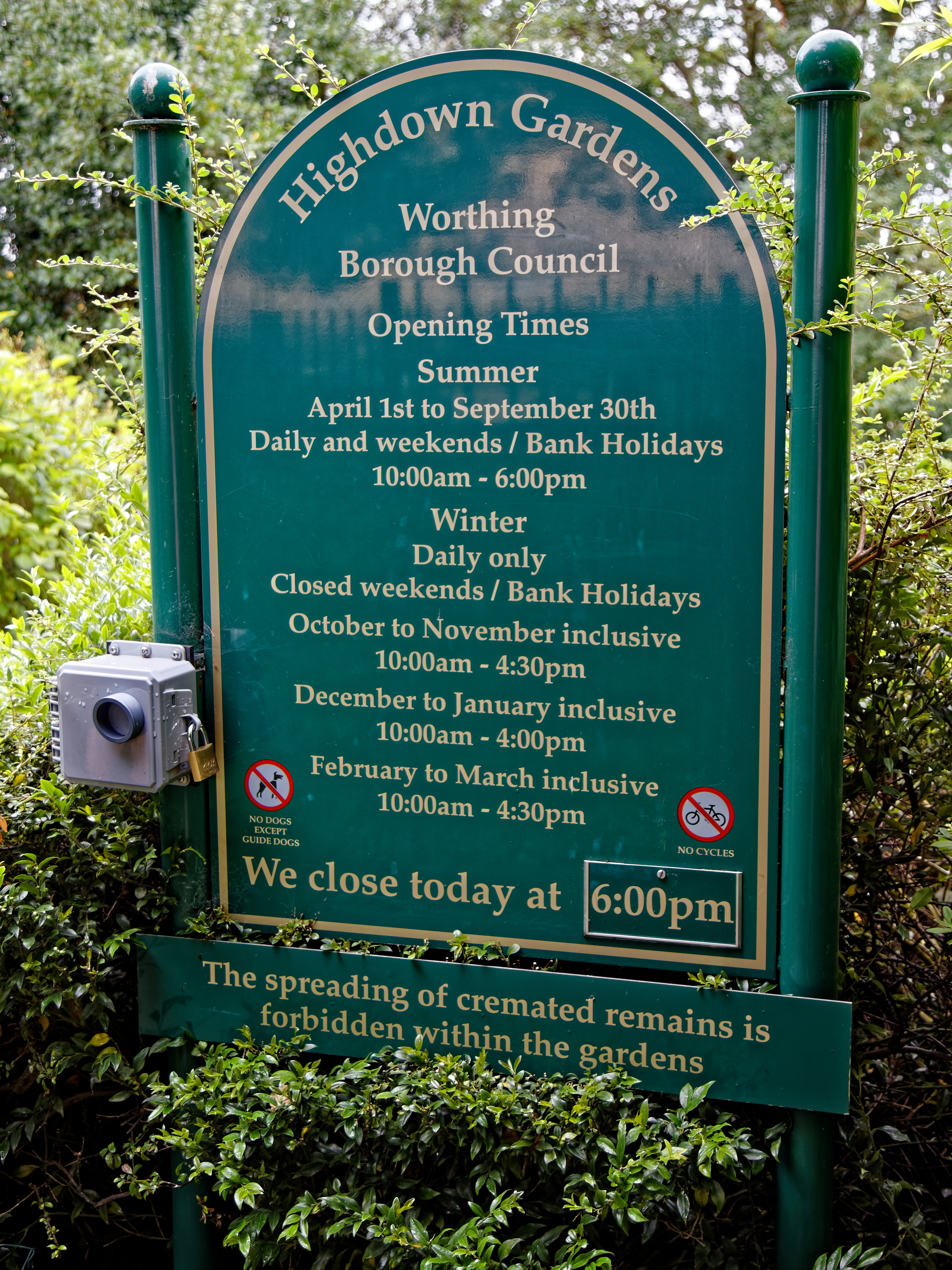
Highdown Gardens

Highdown Gardens are gardens on the western edge of the town of Worthing, close to the village of Ferring and the National Trust archaeological site Highdown Hill, in West Sussex, England. Overlooking the sea from the South Downs, they contain a collection of rare plants and trees, collectively a national collection. The gardens are owned and maintained by Worthing Borough Council with free admission.

Created from a chalk quarry where there was little soil and unfavourable conditions for plant growth, the Chalk Garden at Highdown is the achievement of Sir Frederick Stern (1884–1967) and his wife, who purchased the 8.52 acres (3.45 ha) in 1909 and worked for 50 years to show that plants would grow on chalk.

The gardens were created during a period when expeditions were going to China and the Himalayas collecting rare and interesting plants. Many of the original plants from the early collections are in the garden today, particularly plants collected by Reginald Farrer and Ernest Henry Wilson.

On the death of Sir Frederick in 1967, aged 83, Lady Stern carried out his wishes and left the gardens to Worthing Borough Council.

During spring and early summer there is a succession of flowering bulbs: snowdrops, crocus, anemones and daffodils, followed by paeonies and bearded iris.
