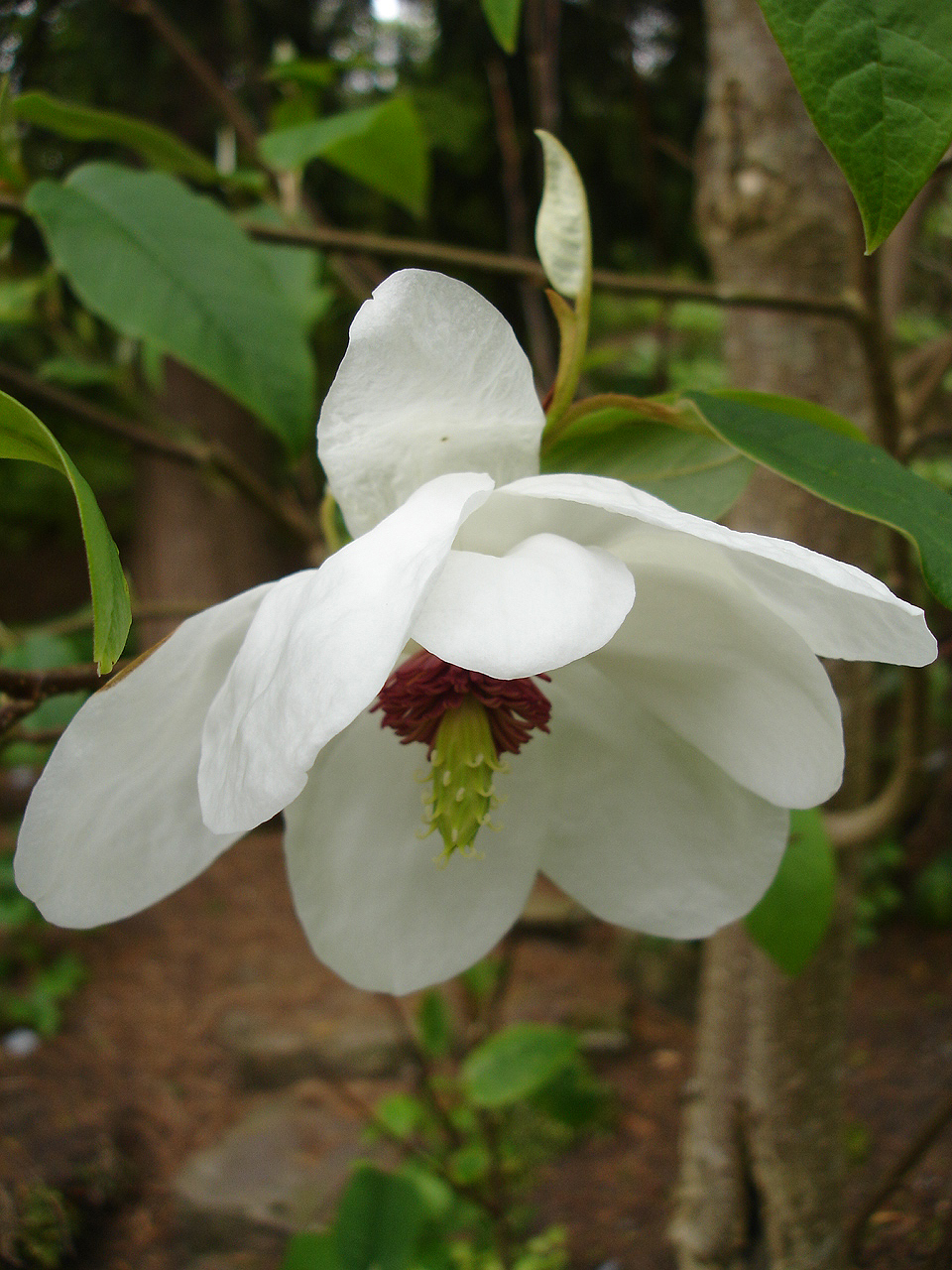
- Flower

Conservation status
- Endangered (IUCN 3.1)

Scientific classification
- Kingdom: Plantae
- Clade: Embryophytes
- Clade: Tracheophytes
- Clade: Spermatophytes
- Clade: Angiosperms
- Clade: Magnoliids
- Order: Magnoliales
- Family: Magnoliaceae
- Genus: Magnolia
- Subgenus: Magnolia subg. Magnolia
- Section: Magnolia sect. Rhytidospermum
- Subsection: Magnolia subsect. Oyama
- Species: M. wilsonii

Binomial name
- Magnolia wilsonii (Finet & Gagnepain) Rehder

Synonyms
- Magnolia globosa subsp. wilsonii (Finet & Gagnep.) J.Li; Magnolia liliifera var. taliensis (W.W.Sm.) Pamp.; Magnolia nicholsoniana Rehder & E.H.Wilson; Magnolia parviflora var. wilsonii Finet & Gagnep.; Magnolia taliensis W.W.Sm.; Magnolia wilsonii f. nicholsoniana (Rehder & E.H.Wilson) Rehder; Magnolia wilsonii var. petrosa Y.W.Law & M.R.Jia; Magnolia wilsonii f. taliensis (W.W.Sm.) Rehder; Oyama wilsonii (Finet & Gagnep.) N.H.Xia & C.Y.Wu

= Magnolia wilsonii =

Species of tree

Magnolia wilsonii, or Wilson's magnolia, is a species of Magnolia native to northeastern Myanmar and south-central China, in the provinces of western Guizhou, Sichuan and northern Yunnan, where it grows in the forest understory at elevations of 1,900-3,000 m, rarely up to 3,300 m.

== Description ==
Magnolia wilsonii is a large spreading shrub or small tree growing to 8–10 metres (26–33 ft) tall. The leaves are elliptic to lanceolate, 6–16 cm long and 3–7 cm broad with a 1–3 cm petiole, and have brown pubescence on the underside. The flowers are drooping, 8–12 cm in diameter, with nine (occasionally 12) tepals, the outer three small and greenish, sepal-like, the main six larger and pure white; the stamens and carpels are crimson. Due to their drooping character, the flowers are best viewed from the underside.

This species is threatened by habitat destruction and collection for medicinal use (see Houpu magnolia), and regeneration is poor.

== Cultivation ==
Magnolia wilsonii, though rare, is in cultivation as an ornamental tree and planted in temperate climate gardens, such as in coastal California. It needs a protected planting location with afternoon shade. This plant has gained the Royal Horticultural Society's Award of Garden Merit.
