= Anemonin =

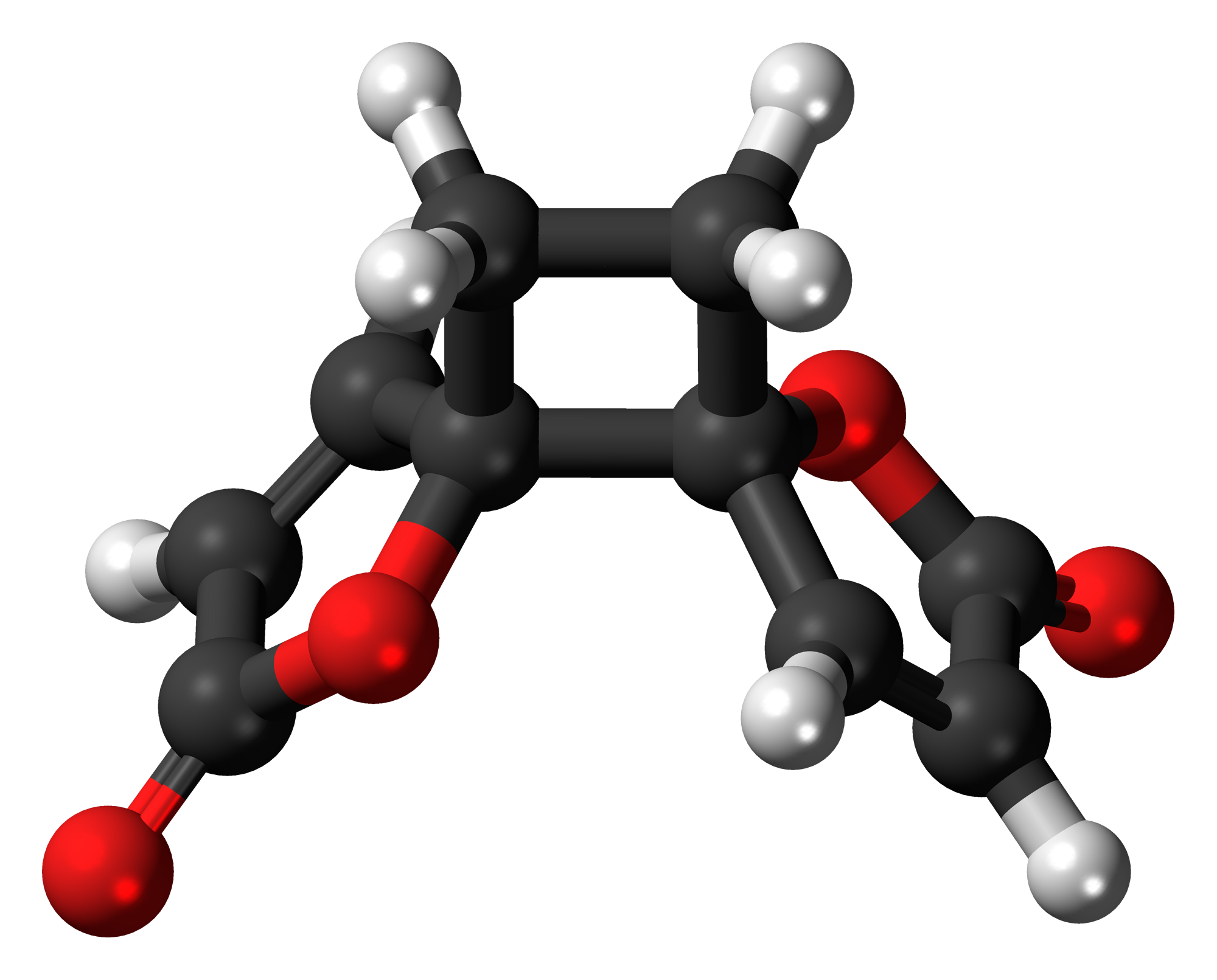

Names
- IUPAC names trans-4,7-Dioxadispiro[4.0.4^{6}.2^{5}]dodeca-1,9-diene-3,8-dione trans-1,7-Dioxadispiro[4.0.4.2]dodeca-3,9-diene-2,8-dione

Identifiers
CAS Number	508-44-1
3D model (JSmol)	Interactive image
ChEMBL	ChEMBL1972777
ChemSpider	10064
PubChem CID	10496
UNII	G99XG5B674
CompTox Dashboard (EPA)	DTXSID70903913
- InChI: InChI=1S/C10H8O4/c11-7-1-3-9(13-7)5-6-10(9)4-2-8(12)14-10/h1-4H,5-6H2 Key: JLUQTCXCAFSSLD-UHFFFAOYSA-N
- SMILES: C1CC2(C13C=CC(=O)O3)C=CC(=O)O2

Properties
Chemical formula	C_{10}H_{8}O_{4}
Molar mass	192.170 g·mol^{−1}
Appearance	Colourless, odourless solid
Density	1.45g/cm^{3}
Melting point	158 °C (316 °F; 431 K)
Boiling point	535.7 °C (996.3 °F; 808.9 K) @ 760mmHg
Solubility in water	low
Solubility in chloroform	very soluble

Hazards
Flash point	300.7 °C (573.3 °F; 573.8 K)
- Lethal dose or concentration (LD, LC)
LD_{50} (median dose)	150 mg·kg^{−1} (mouse, IP)
- Except where otherwise noted, data are given for materials in their standard state (at 25 °C [77 °F], 100 kPa). verify (what is ?) Infobox references

Anemonin is a dibutenolide natural product found in members of the buttercup family (Ranunculaceae) such as Helleborus niger, Ranunculus bulbosus, R. ficaria, R. sardous, R. sceleratus, and Clematis hirsutissima. Originally isolated in 1792 by M. Heyer, It is the dimerization product of the toxin protoanemonin. One of the likely active agents in plants used in Chinese medicine as an anti-inflammatory and Native American medicine as a horse stimulant, its unique biological properties give it pharmaceutical potential as an anti-inflammatory agent.

== Biosynthetic origins ==
Anemonin is a homodimer formed from two protoanemonin subunits. Protoanemonin is formed from the enzymatic cleavage of ranunculin upon crushing plant matter. When a plant from this family is injured, a β-glucosidase cleaves ranunculin, liberating protoanemonin from glucose as a defense mechanism. This butenolide readily dimerizes in aqueous media to form a single cyclodimer.

=== Biosynthesis pathway ===
	ranunculin
↓ – glucose	(plant wounded)
	protoanemonin
↓ dimerization	(spontaneous)
	anemonin

== Chemical structure and proposed mechanism of formation ==
Based on the spontaneous dimerization observed following synthesis of protoanemonin by Asahina in 1920, it was assumed that the two butenolide rings of anemonin have a cis or head-to-head stereochemistry. The highly selective formation of the dimer was explained by a stable diradical intermediate; it was expected that after an initial carbon-carbon bond forming step the free electrons would be delocalized through the adjacent double bonds.

Despite multiple stereochemical possibilities, X-ray crystallography of solid anemonin in 1965 revealed that the two butenolide rings exclusively possess a trans relationship. Destabilizing dipole-dipole interactions disfavor the transition state where the two rings adopt a cis conformation, leading to selectivity for the more stable trans relationship.

The formation of anemonin from protoanemonin is most likely a photochemical process. A study by Kataoka and colleagues comparing the dimerization of protoanemonin in the presence and absence of UV radiation from a mercury lamp found a 75% yield with radiation and a very poor yield without. It is not mentioned whether light was excluded from this control reaction; the low yield of anemonin may have arisen from visible light-mediated dimerization of protoanemonin.

== Pharmaceutical potential ==
Though Anemonin and protoanemonin share antibiotic activity, Anemonin is anti-inflammatory rather than an irritant like its parent monomer. Anemonin has been demonstrated to have activity which prevents or decreases LPS-induced cytokine release, nitric oxide production and oxidative cell damage, which are thought to be responsible for the anti-inflammatory effect of certain herbs used in traditional Chinese medicine. In fact, many studies have demonstrated anemonin's potential for the treatment of inflammatory and cardiovascular diseases including cerebral ischemia,ulcerative colitis, arthritisand inflammatory bone loss.

Given its skin permeability in ethanolic solutions and its anti-inflammatory properties, anemonin may be a good candidate for topical formulations as an arthritis medication.

=== Synthetic preparation ===
Extraction from fresh plants has been suggested as a method for industrial-scale preparation of anemonin, but the long and complicated procedures required to achieve a pure extract favors the use of synthetic approaches. This is especially true given that methods of synthesizing protoanemonin from several commercially available starting materials already exist, and anemonin is its spontaneously formed dimer. Kotera's efficient synthesis of protoanemonin from 2-Deoxy-D-ribose can be employed, then the product held at room temperature overnight to allow dimerization to anemonin. The findings of an investigation by Kataoka and colleagues in 1965 implied that this dimerization may be mediated by visible light.

==== Kotera Synthesis ====
	2-Deoxy-D-ribose
↓ HCl, MeOH
2	1-O-Methyl-2-Deoxy-D-ribose
↓ TolCl/pyridine
3
↓ MCPBA/ BF3-OEt2
4	Crystalline solid; 58% overall yield
↓ 5eq. NEt3 (stirred overnight)	80% yield
	Protoanemonin; 46% overall yield
↓ dimerization	(spontaneous, may be sped up by light)
	anemonin
