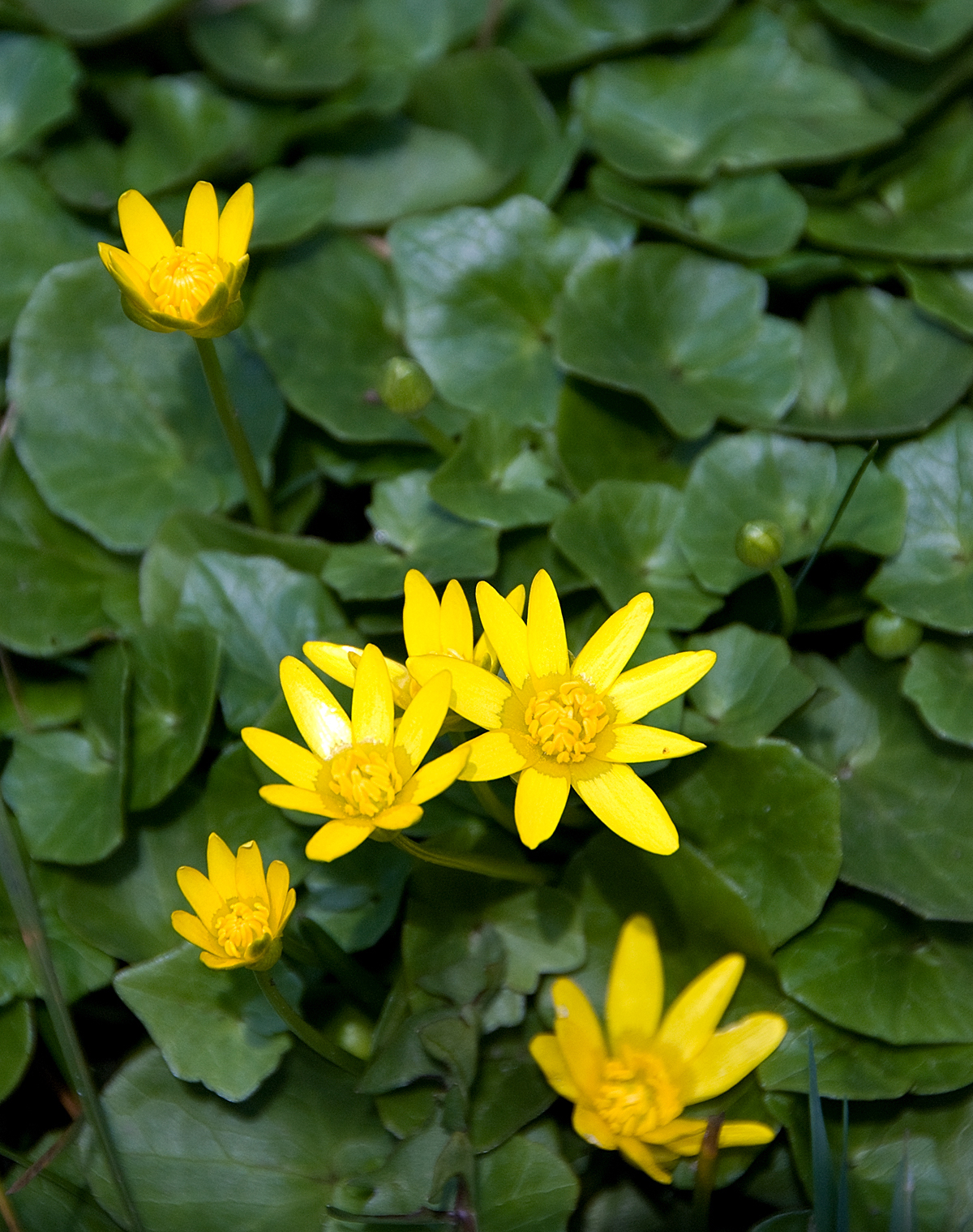

Scientific classification
- Kingdom: Plantae
- Clade: Tracheophytes
- Clade: Angiosperms
- Clade: Eudicots
- Order: Ranunculales
- Family: Ranunculaceae
- Genus: Ficaria
- Species: F. verna

Binomial name
- Ficaria verna Huds. 1762

Synonyms
- Synonyms: Caltha hiranoi Tamura; Chelidonium minus Garsault [Invalid]; Ficaria ambigua Boreau; Ficaria aperta Schur; Ficaria boryi Heldr. ex Nyman; Ficaria bulbifera (Á.Löve & D.Löve) Holub; Ficaria communis Dum.Cours.; Ficaria degenii Harv.; Ficaria ficaria (L.) H.Karst. [Invalid]; Ficaria holubyi Schur; Ficaria intermedia Schur; Ficaria peloponnesiaca Nyman; Ficaria polypetala Gilib. [Invalid]; Ficaria pumila Velen. ex Bornm.; Ficaria ranunculiflora Moench ex St.-Lag.; Ficaria ranunculoides Roth [Illegitimate]; Ficaria robertii F.W.Schultz; Ficaria rotundifolia Schur; Ficaria stepporum P.A.Smirn.; Ficaria transsilvanica Schur; Ficaria varia Otsch.; Ficaria vulgaris J.St.-Hil.; Ranunculus ficaria L.

= Ficaria verna =

Lesser celandine

Species of flowering plant in the buttercup family

Ficaria verna (formerly Ranunculus ficaria L.), commonly known as lesser celandine or pilewort, is a low-growing, hairless perennial flowering plant in the buttercup family Ranunculaceae. It has fleshy dark green, heart-shaped leaves and distinctive flowers with bright yellow, glossy petals. Native to Europe and Western Asia, it is now introduced in North America, where it is known by the common name fig buttercup and considered an invasive species. The plant is poisonous if ingested raw and potentially fatal to grazing animals and livestock, such as horses, cattle, and sheep. For these reasons, several US states have banned the plant or listed it as a noxious weed. It prefers bare, damp ground and is considered by horticulturalists in the United Kingdom as a persistent garden weed; nevertheless, many specialist plantsmen, nursery owners and discerning gardeners in the UK and Europe collect selected cultivars of the plant, including bronze-leaved and double-flowered ones. Emerging in late winter with flowers appearing late February through May in the UK, its appearance across the landscape is regarded by many as a harbinger of spring.

== Description ==
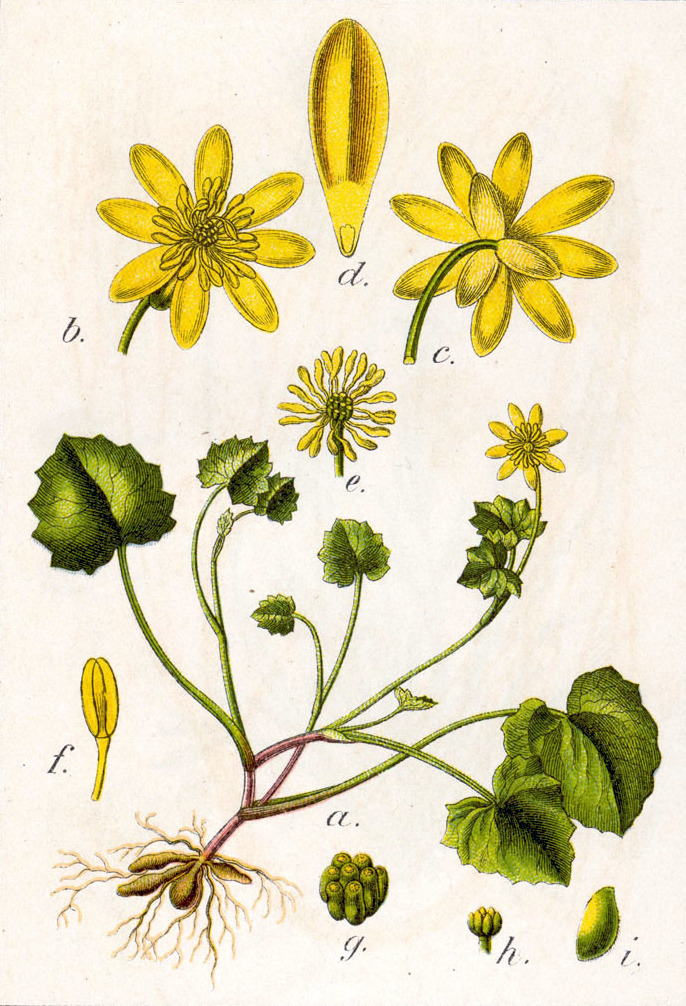

Lesser celandine is a hairless perennial plant to about 25 cm (9.8 in) high, growing in clumps of 4–10 short stems, on which the leaves are spirally-arranged or all basal. The leaf stalks have sheathing bases, no stipules, a groove along their upper surface, and two hollows within. The leaves are cordate, 1–4 cm (0.39–1.57 in) across, dark-green above with a distinctive variegated or mottled pattern, and pale green below. Purple-leaved varieties are common. The margins of the leaves are sometimes entire (rounded) but more often angled or weakly lobed, with hydathodes at the tips. There are two types of roots: dense clusters of thick, pale-coloured elongated tubers surrounded by patches of short, fibrous roots. Some clumps give rise to long stolons to 10 cm (3.9 in) or more, allowing vegetative spread to produce extensive carpets of plants.

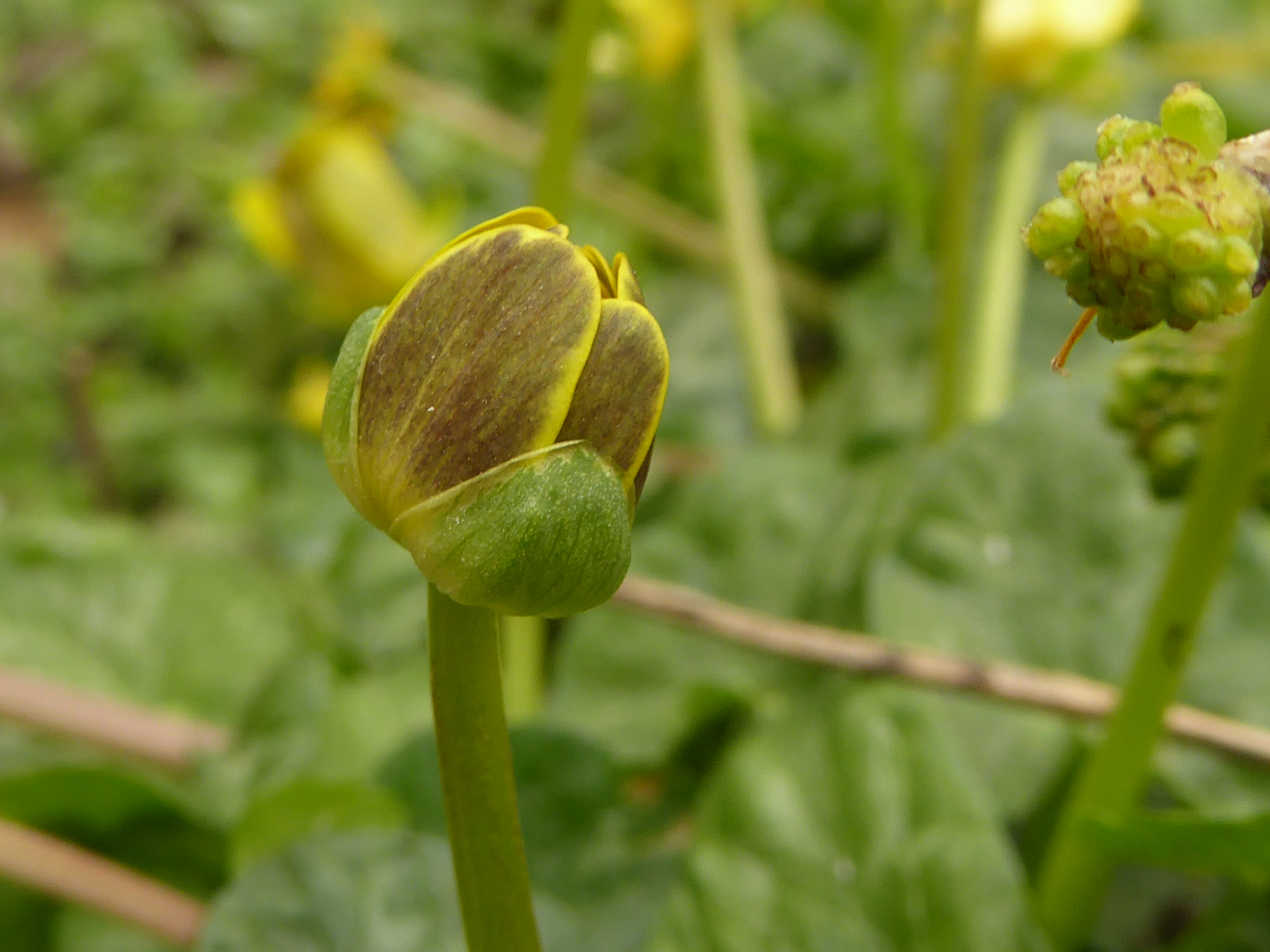
Closed-up flowerhead of lesser celandine, showing the sepals and outside of the petals

It produces large actinomorphic (radially symmetrical) flowers with a diameter of up to 3–5 cm (1.2–2.0 in), on long stalks arising individually from the leaf axils or in loose cymes at the top of the stem. There are no bracts. The flowers have a whorl of 3 sepaloid tepals and 7 to 12 glossy yellow petaloid tepals, which are sometimes tinged purple or grey on the back. Double flowered varieties also occur. The stamens and carpels are numerous, and the fruit is a single-seeded, shortly hairy achene with a very short style. In several subspecies, tubers are formed in the leaf axils after flowering. It blooms between March and May in the UK.

== Distribution ==
Ficaria verna sensu lato is native to central Europe, north Africa and the Caucasus. It has been introduced into Iceland and North America.

== Life cycle ==
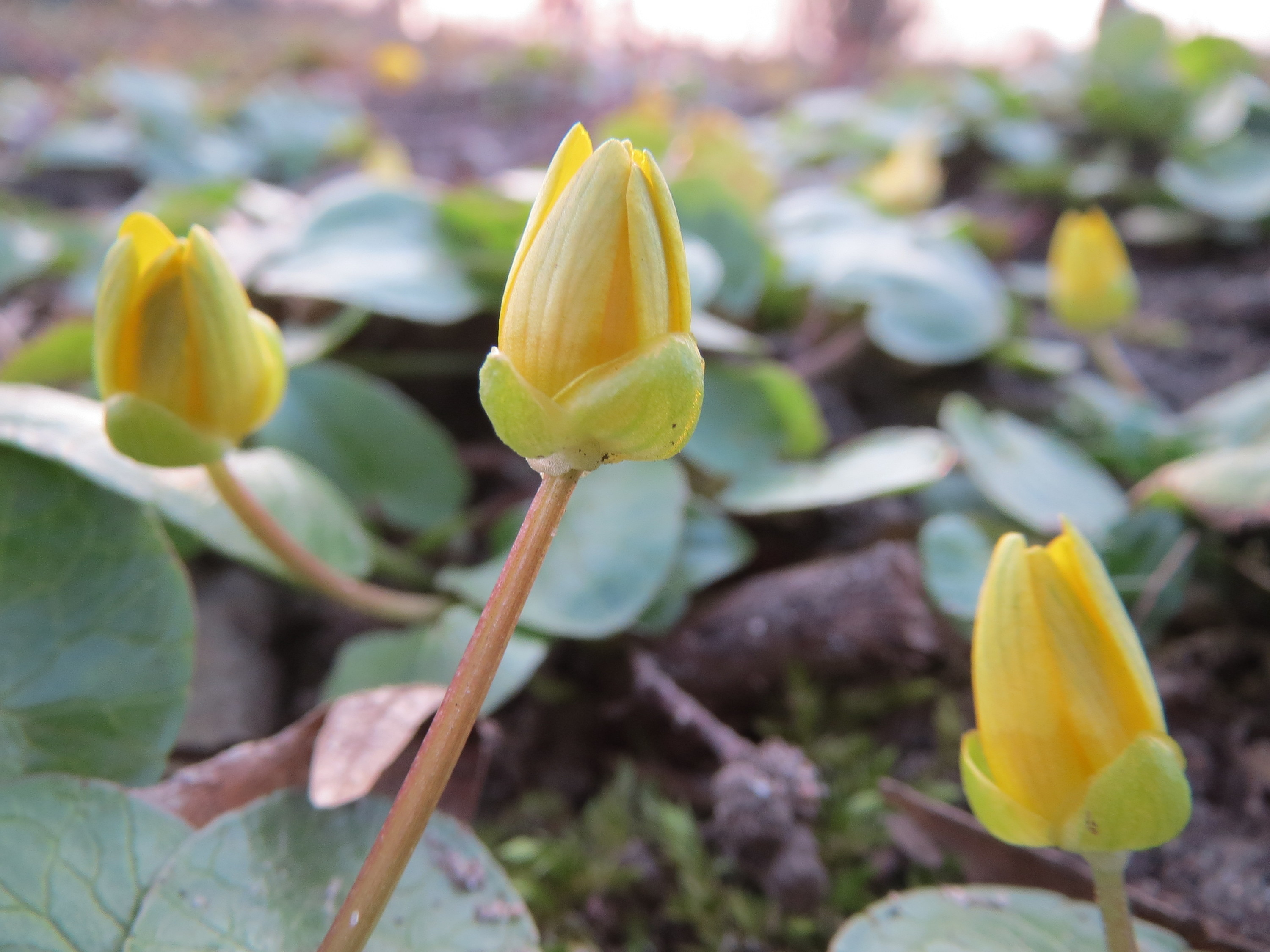
Flowers appear in early spring.

Lesser celandine grows on land that is seasonally wet or flooded, especially in sandy soils, but is not found in permanently waterlogged sites. In both shaded woodlands and open areas, Ficaria verna begins growth in the winter when temperatures are low and days are short. The plants mostly propagate and spread vegetatively, although some subspecies are capable of producing up to 73 seeds per flower. Germination of seeds begins in the spring, and continues into summer. Seedlings remain small for their first year, producing only one or two leaves until the second year.

Growth and reproduction is poor in dry or acidic conditions, though the plants can handle drought well once dormant. By emerging before the forest canopy leafs out, Ficaria verna is able to take advantage of the higher levels of sunlight reaching the forest floor during late winter and early spring. By late spring, second year plants quickly age as daylight hours lengthen and temperatures rise. By the end of May, foliage has died back and plants enter a six month dormancy phase.

If disturbed, separation of the plant's numerous basal tubers is an efficient means of vegetative propagation. The plants are easily spread if the prolific tubers are unearthed and scattered by digging activities of some animals and humans. Erosion and flood events are particularly effective means of spread, as the plants are very successful at colonizing low-lying floodplains once deposited.

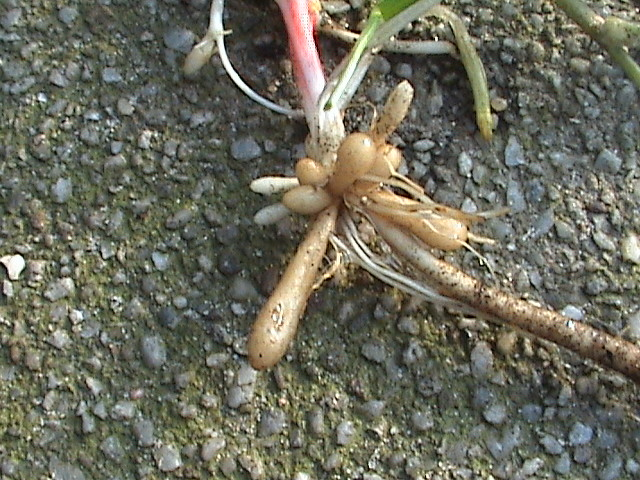
Typical root tubers: these structures separate easily and can become new plants, allowing the plant to colonize new areas rapidly.

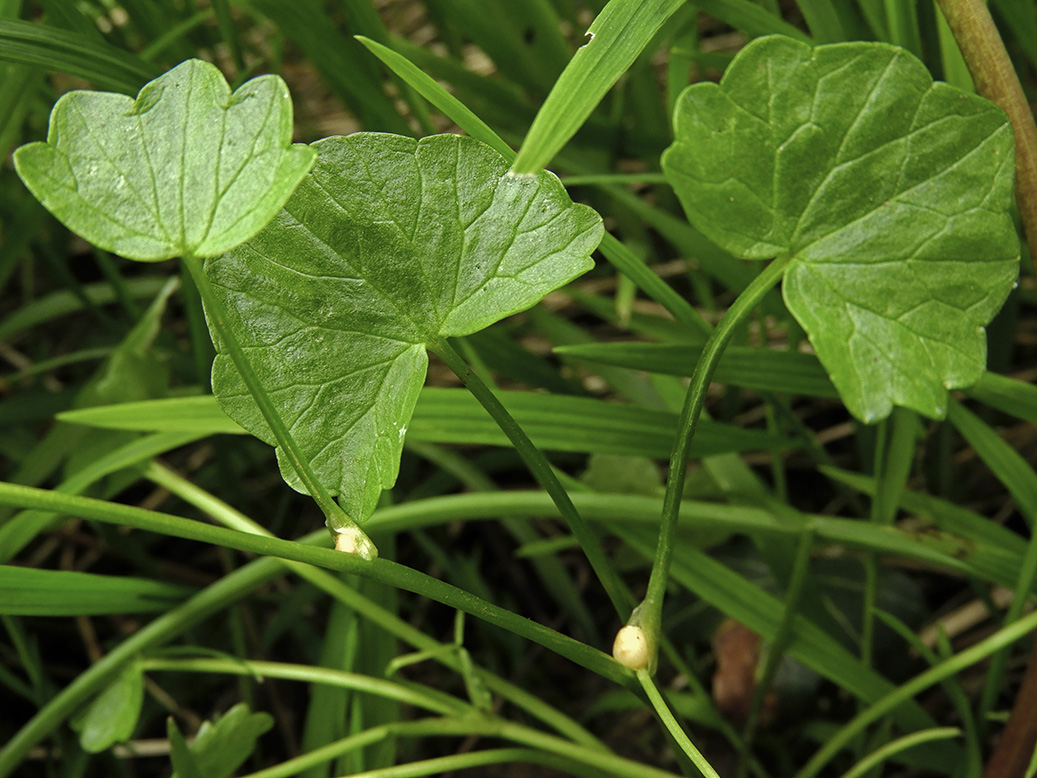
Bulbils form in the leaf axils of some subspecies after flowering.

Ficaria verna exists in both diploid (2n=16) and tetraploid (2n=32) forms which are very similar in appearance. However, the tetraploid types prefer more shady locations and can develop up to 24 bulbils at the base of the stalk. Subspecies F. verna ssp. verna, and F. verna ssp. ficariiformis are tetraploid and capable of colonizing new areas much faster because they produce bulbils in their leaf axils in addition to root tubers. Subspecies F. verna calthifolia and F. verna verna are diploid and hybrids between subspecies often create sterile triploid forms.

== Ecology ==
Lesser celandine is pollinated by bees, small beetles, and flies, including Apis mellifera, Bibio johannis, Phora, and Meligethes. The larvae of Olindia schumacherana feed on the leaves.

It associates with arbuscular mycorrhizal fungi.

=== Fungal and oomycetous pathogens ===
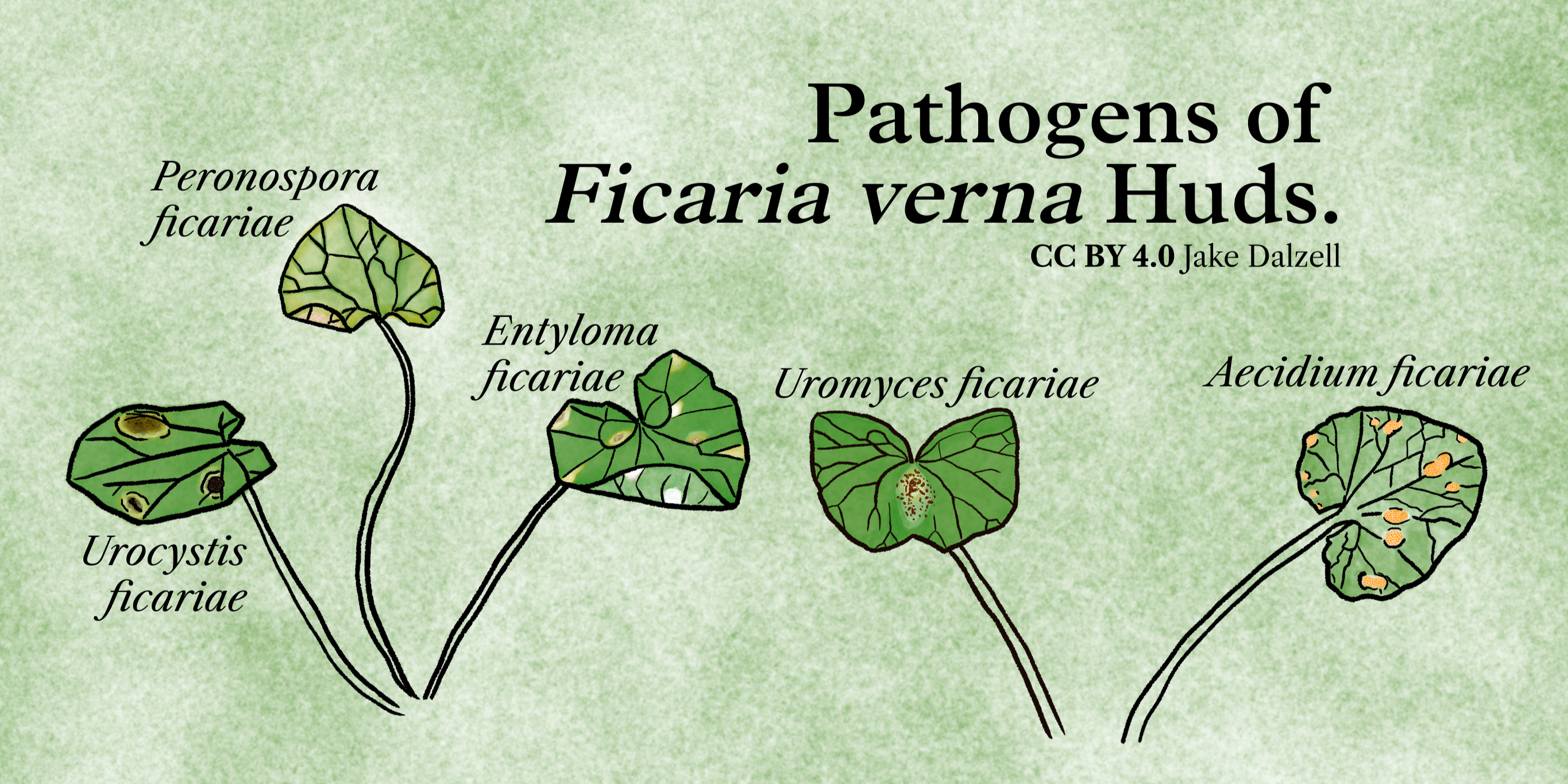
An illustration showing some of the fungal and oomycetous pathogens that infect Ficaria verna

The leaves are parasitised by the chytrid fungus Synchytrium anomalum; the rust fungi Schroeteriaster alpinus, Uromyces ficariae, U. poae, and U. rumicis; the smut fungi Entyloma ficariae and Urocystis ficariae; the leaf spot fungi Septoria ficariae and Colletotrichum dematium; the grey mould Botrytis ficariarum; and the downy mildew Peronospora ficariae.

The roots are parasitised by the fungi Botryotinia ficariarum (the anamorph of which is Botrytis ficariarum) and Dumontinia tuberosa.

=== As an invasive species ===
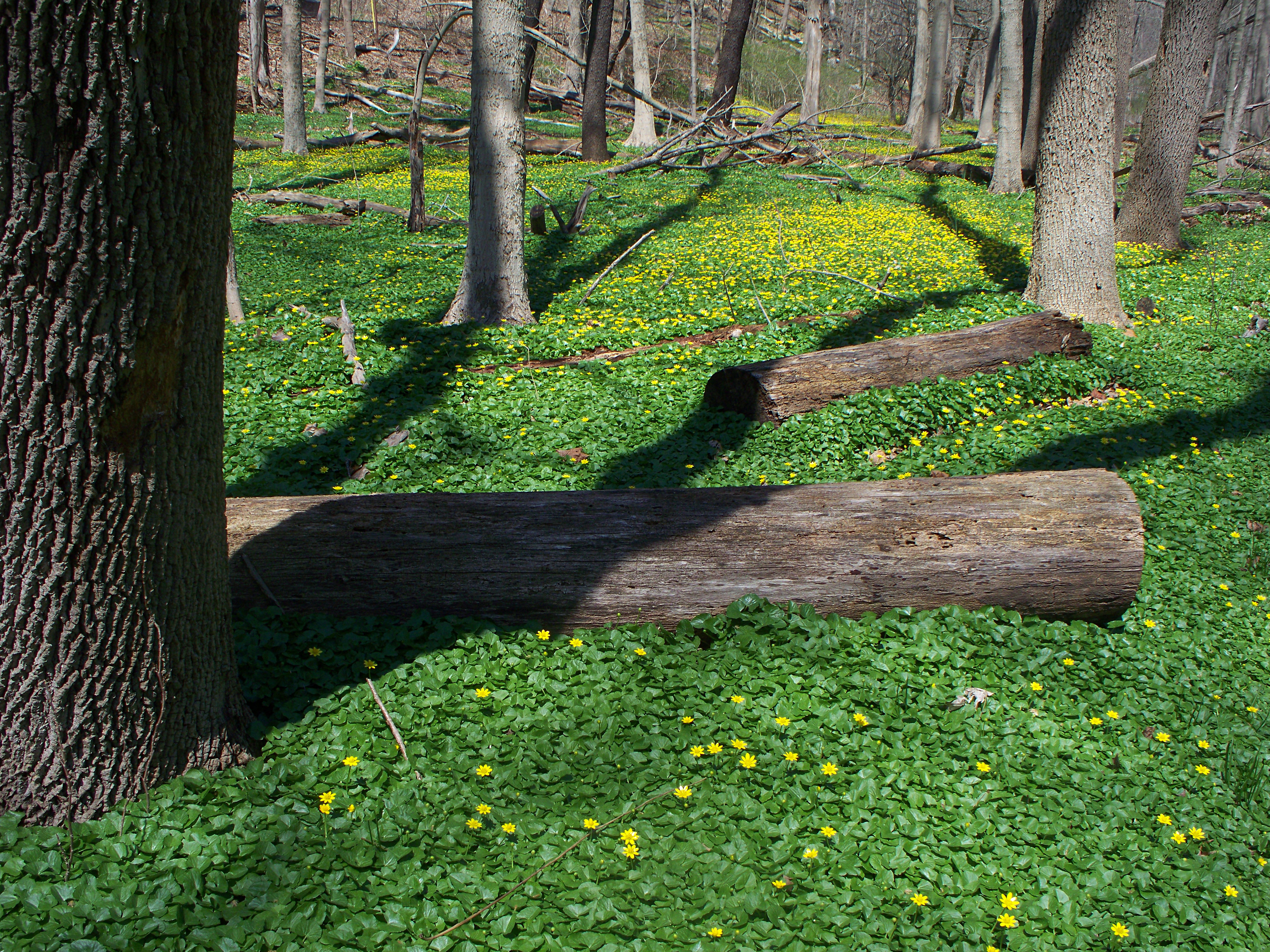
As an invasive species it forms a dense carpet in a floodplain forest in Fox Chapel, Pennsylvania.

In many parts of the Eastern and Northwestern United States and Canada, lesser celandine is cited as an invasive species. It poses a threat to native wildflowers, especially those ephemeral flowers with a spring-flowering lifecycle. Since Ficaria verna emerges well before most native species, it has a developmental advantage which allows it to establish and dominate natural areas rapidly. It is mainly a problem in forested floodplains, where it forms extensive mats, but can occur on upland sites as well. Once established, native plants are displaced and ground is left barren and susceptible to erosion, from June to February, during the plant's six-month dormancy phase.

In the United States, where lesser celandine is considered a plant pest to gardens, lawns, and natural areas, many governmental agencies have attempted to slow the spread of this species with limited success. As of 2014, the species was reported to be invasive and established in 25 states. USDA APHIS considers Ficaria verna to be a high-risk weed that could spread across 79% of the United States, anticipating possible impacts to threatened and endangered riparian species. The U.S. National Park Service's Plant Conservation Alliance recommends avoiding planting lesser celandine, and instead planting native ephemeral wildflowers such as Asarum canadense, bloodroot, the native twinleaf (Jeffersonia diphylla), and various species of Trillium as alternatives.

== As a garden plant ==
Christopher Lloyd is one of several horticulturists who have recommended one of the double-flowered Flore Pleno Group for planting at the base of a hedge next to a lawn. The Daily Telegraph has even given advice on how to plant them, provided by the Royal Horticultural Society. Double-flowered plants were noted as long ago as 1625 when one was found by John Ray. The RHS specialist quarterly publication The Plantsman published a lengthy, well-illustrated article on double-flowered lesser celandine cultivars by Belgian gardener and alpine plant specialist Wim Boens in December 2017. "RHS Plant Finder" online lists around 220 named cultivars (many of these may well be very similar; nevertheless, this indicates the interest in the species among gardeners).

=== Recommended cultivars ===
(Double-flowered and semi-double cultivars are unlikely to be invasive as they either cannot set seed or do not often do so. Semi-doubles may occasionally cross with single cultivars, which is probably how some of the most desirable cultivars originally arose.)

- Alba Group (cream to white flowers; foliage green or variously mottled with silver and occasional splashes of purple)
- Brambling (unremarkable yellow flowers; grown for its small triangular or horseshoe-shaped leaves beautifully mottled with silver-grey and purple-brown)
- Brazen Hussy (bright yellow flowers; glossy dark bronze foliage)
- Collarette (golden yellow double flowers with neat, button-like centres, green in the middle, and a gappy ring of outer petals; silvery-green leaves often with a central streak or splash of purple-black)
- Coppernob (bright orange, single flowers; glossy dark bronze foliage)
- Double Bronze (syns. Bowles's Double, Wisley Double) (semi-double rich yellow flowers with reddish-bronze reverse; green foliage streaked with silver)
- Double Mud (semi-double flowers, cream petals, muddy purple-brown on the reverse; green foliage mottled with silver)
- Flore Pleno Group (fully double yellow flowers, green or greenish purple on the reverse making a neat rounded centre; foliage pale green or dappled with silver)
- Green Petal (a curiosity with small double flowers resembling greenish-yellow roses; distinctive green foliage splashed silver, purple and bronze)
- Ken Aslet Double (syn. Ken Aslet) (sterile, fully double white, cream at centre, dark purplish reverse to the petals; plain green or slightly mottled foliage)
- Salmon's White (single flowers open cream, fading almost to white, purplish-blue on reverse; dark green foliage splashed silver and black)
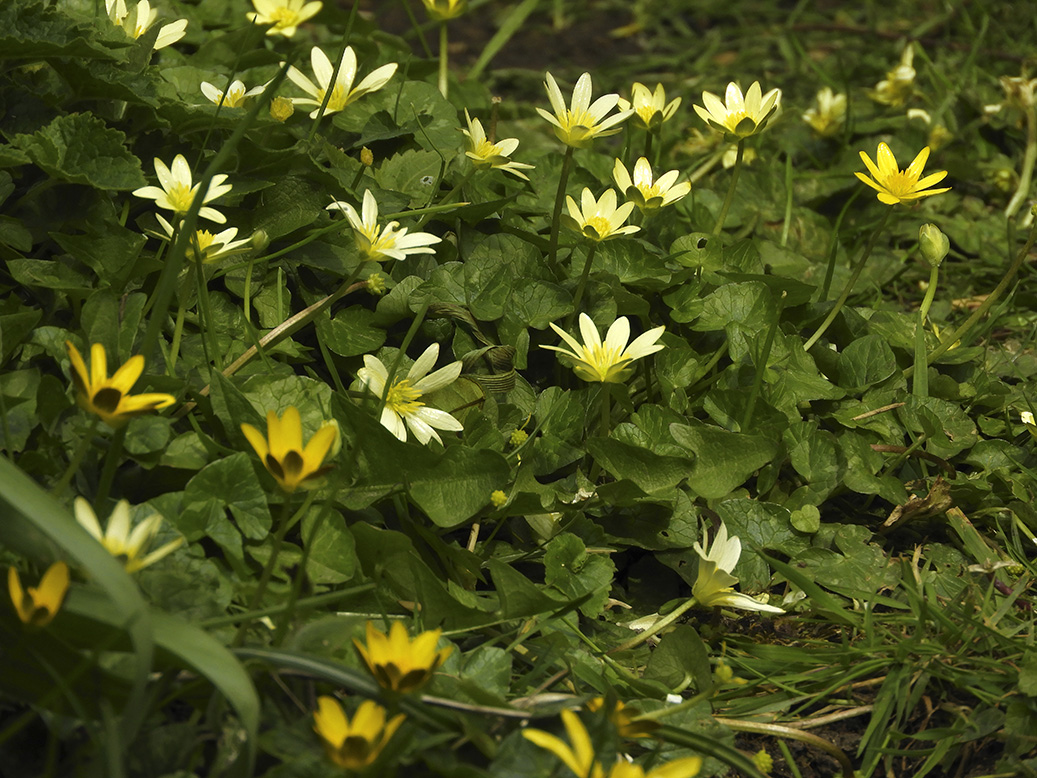
Alba Group

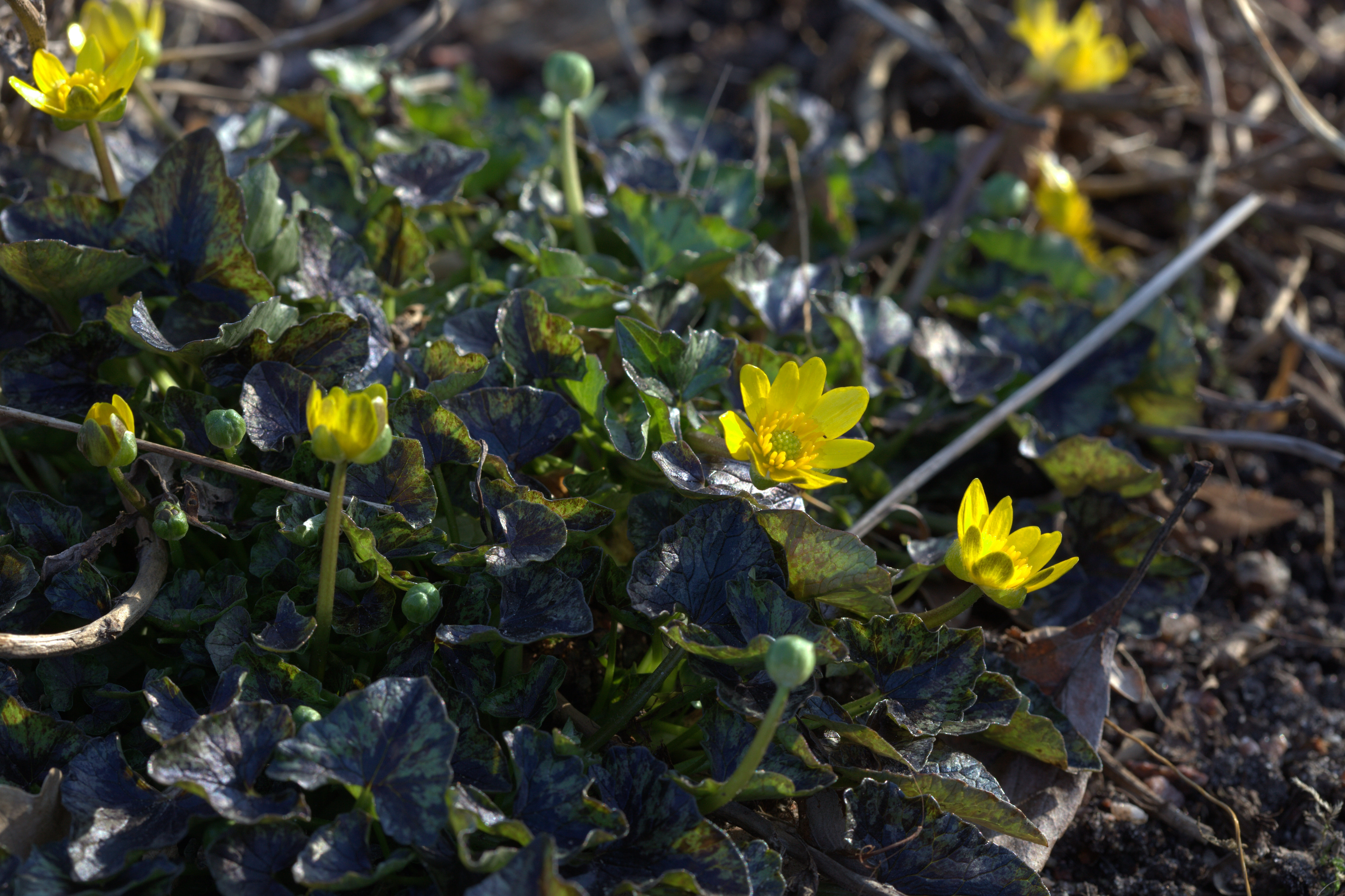
'Brambling'

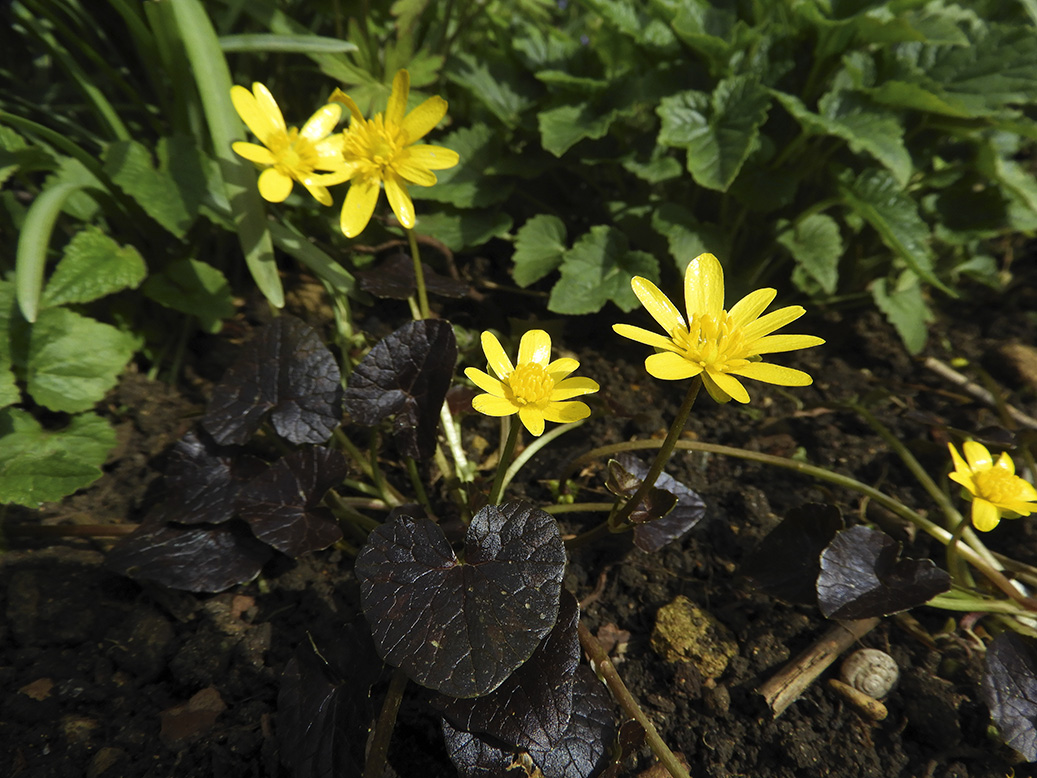
'Brazen Hussy'

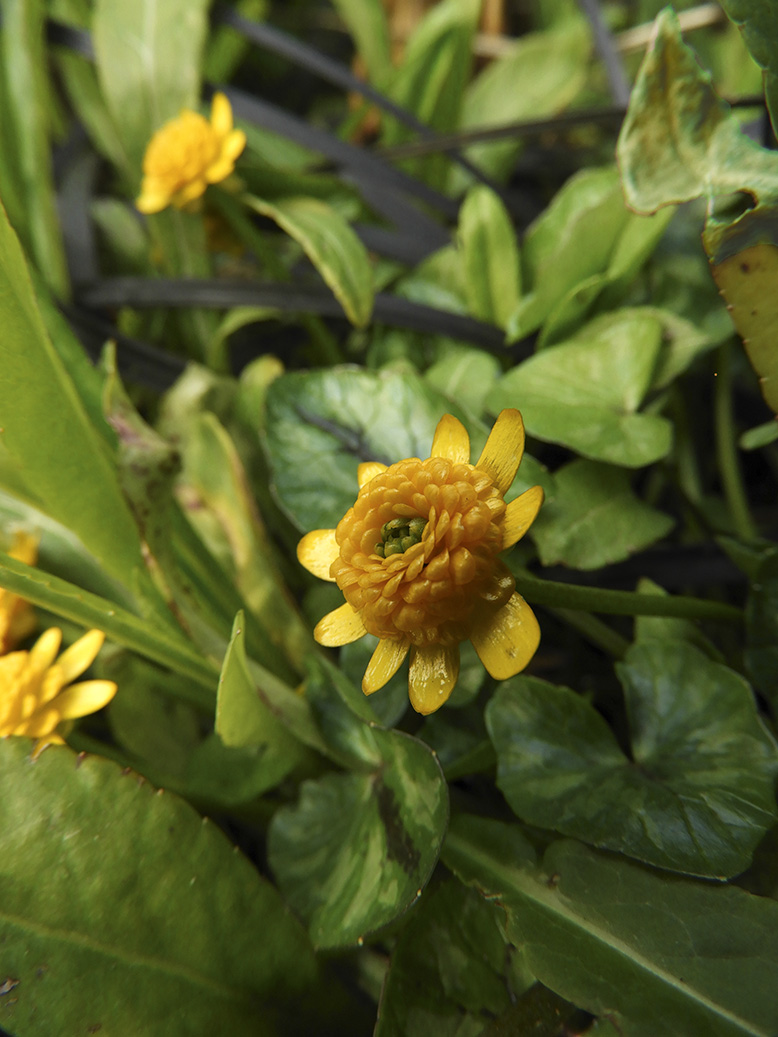
'Collarette'

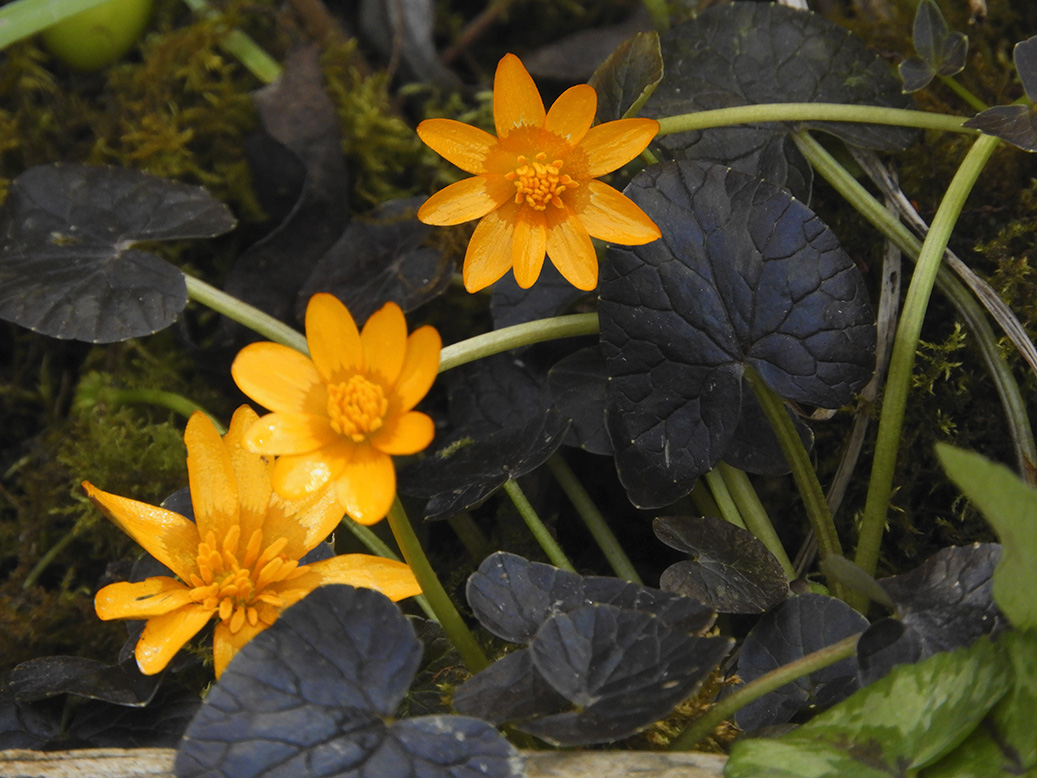
'Coppernob'

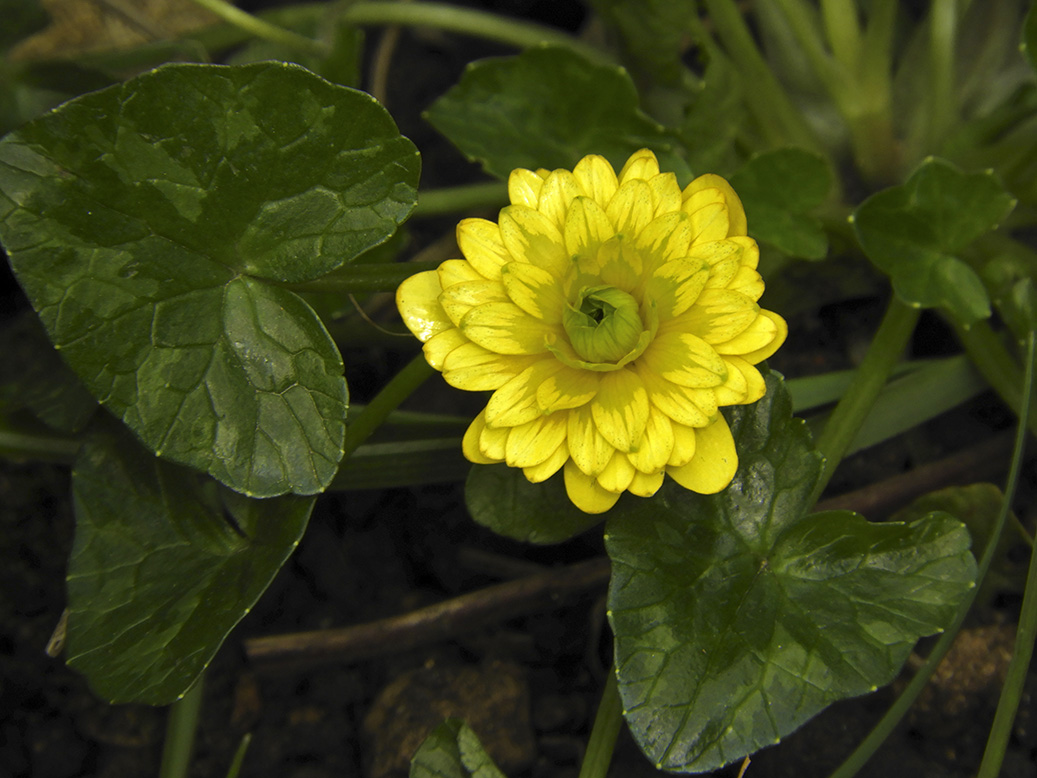
Flore Pleno Group

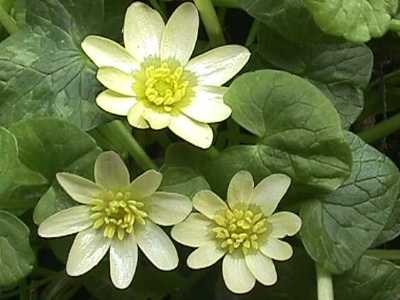
'Salmon's White'

== Toxicity ==
All plants of the buttercup family (Ranunculaceae) contain a compound known as protoanemonin. When the plant is wounded, the unstable glucoside ranunculin turns into the toxin protoanemonin. Contact with damaged or crushed Ficaria leaves can cause itching, rashes or blistering on the skin or mucosa. Ingesting the toxin can cause nausea, vomiting, dizziness, spasms, or paralysis. In one case, a patient experienced acute hepatitis and jaundice when taking untreated lesser celandine extracts internally as an herbal remedy for hemorrhoids.

=== Treatment ===
On drying of these plants, the protoanemonin toxin dimerizes to non-toxic anemonin, which is further hydrolyzed to non-toxic dicarboxylic acids. Cooking of the plants also eliminates the toxicity of the plants and the plant has been incorporated in diets or herbal medicine after being dried, and ground for flour, or boiled and consumed as a vegetable.

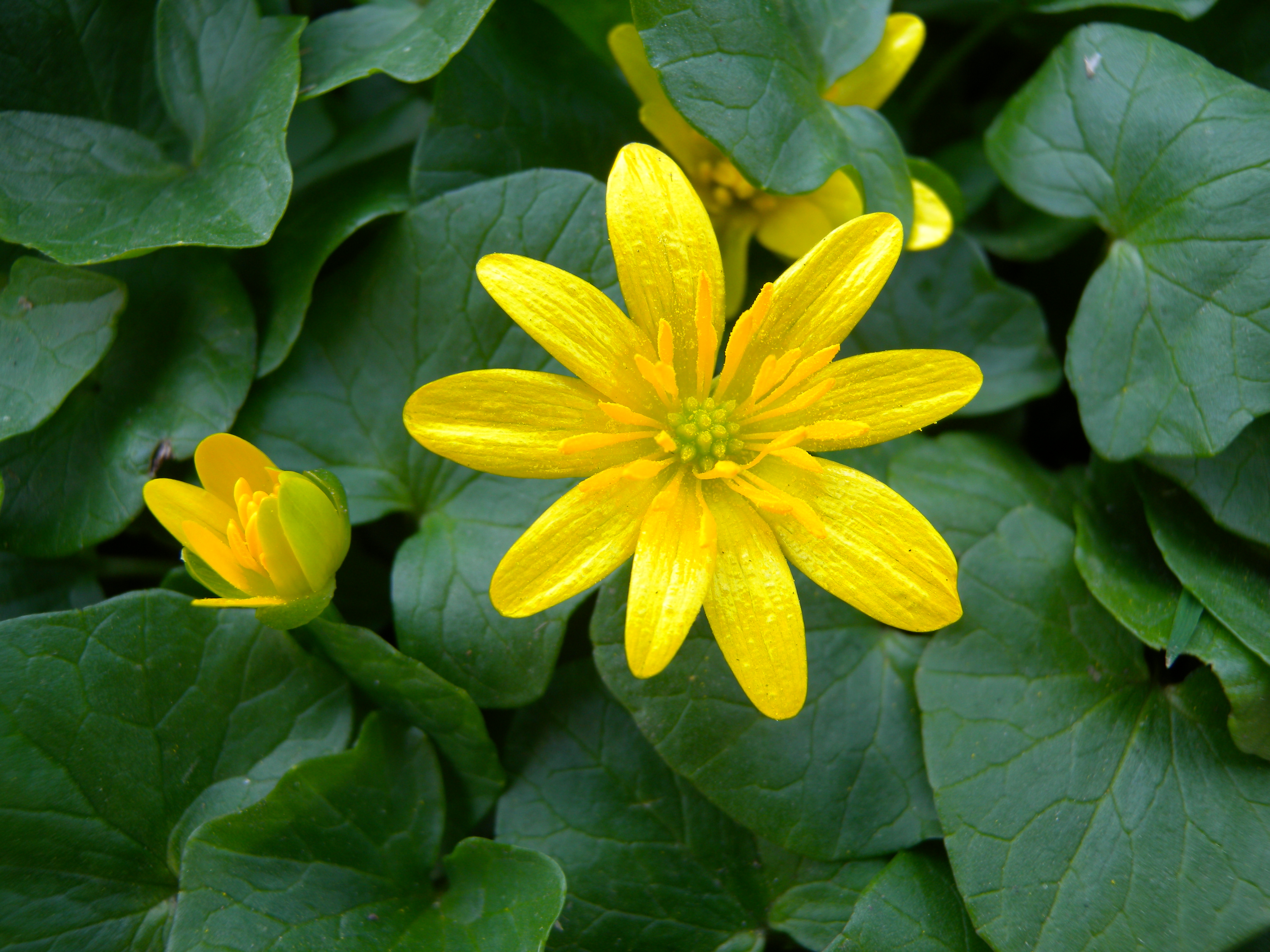

== Historical herbal use ==
The plant is known as pilewort by some herbalists because it has historically been used to treat piles (hemorrhoids). Lesser celandine is still recommended in several "current" herbal guides for treatment of hemorrhoids by applying an ointment of raw leaves as a cream or lanolin to the affected area. Supposedly, the knobby tubers of the plant resemble piles, and according to the doctrine of signatures this resemblance suggests that pilewort could be used to cure piles.

Nicholas Culpepper (1616–1654), is claimed to have treated his daughter for 'scrofula' (or Kings evil) with the plant.

The German vernacular Skorbutkraut ("scurvy herb") derives from the use of young leaves, which are high in vitamin C, to prevent scurvy. However, use of lesser celandine to prevent scurvy could be considered a misnomer, tied to its similar appearance to common scurvygrass (Cochlearia officinalis), which shares similarly shaped leaves as well as sharing the german name Skorbutkraut. The German Hager's Manual of pharmacy practice of 1900 states Ranunculus ficaria [sic] and C. officinalis both share this name and use, though there was little documentation of the toxicity of untreated Ficaria species at the time.

Most guides today point out that medicines should be made from the dried herb or by heat extraction as the untreated plants and extracts will contain protoanemonin, a mild toxin. The plant has been widely used in Russia and is sold in most pharmacies as a dried herb. The protoanemonin found in fresh leaves is an irritant and mildly toxic but is suggested to have antibacterial properties if used externally. The process of heating or drying turns the Ranunculaceae toxin to anemonin which is non-toxic and may have antispasmodic and analgesic properties.

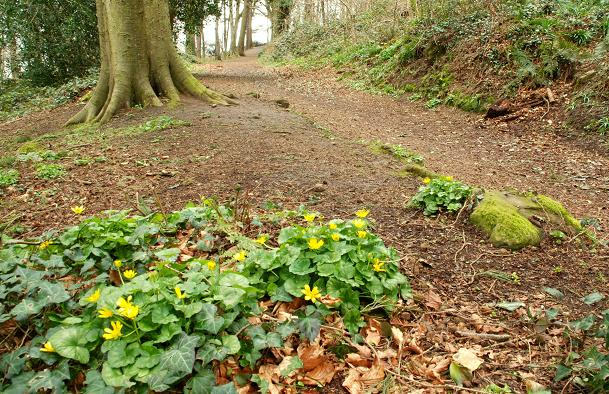
Killynether wood, Northern Ireland

Mesolithic Hunter gatherers in Europe consumed the roots of the plant as a source of carbohydrates boiled, fried or roasted.

== References in literature ==
The poet William Wordsworth was very fond of the flower, which inspired him to write three poems: "To the Small Celandine", "To the Same Flower", and "The Small Celandine". The third poem begins thus:

There is a Flower, the lesser Celandine,
That shrinks, like many more, from cold and rain;
And, the first moment that the sun may shine,
Bright as the sun himself, 'tis out again!

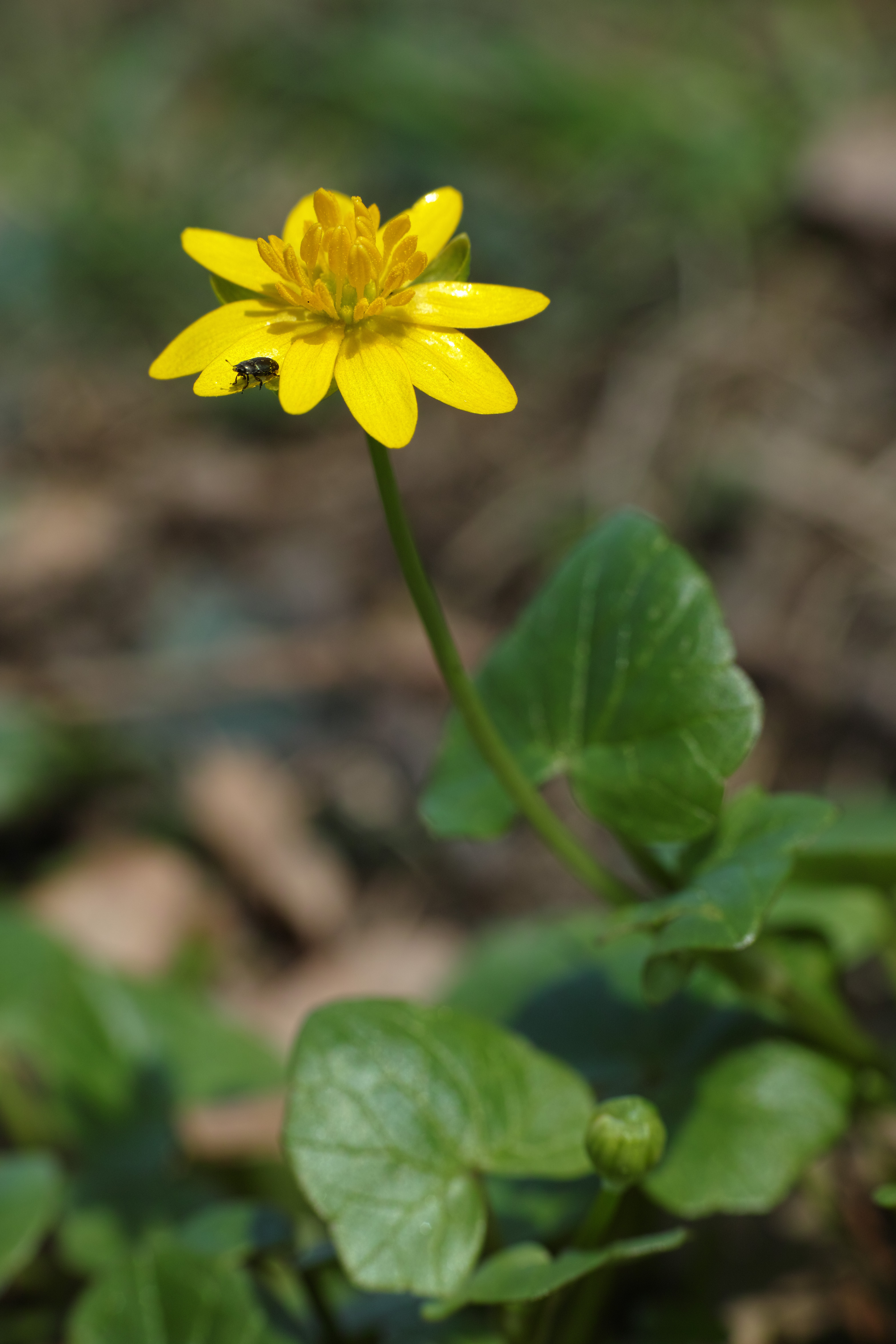
Near České Budějovice, Czech Republic

Upon Wordsworth's death it was proposed that a celandine be carved on his memorial plaque inside St Oswald's Church, Grasmere, but unfortunately the greater celandine Chelidonium majus was mistakenly used.

Edward Thomas wrote a poem entitled "Celandine". Encountering the flowers in a field, the narrator is reminded of a past love, now dead. He also remarked on banks of celandines in his early prose work "In Pursuit of Spring" (1913).

C. S. Lewis mentions celandines in a key passage of The Lion, the Witch and the Wardrobe, when Aslan comes to Narnia and the whole wood passes "in a few hours or so from January to May". The children notice "wonderful things happening. Coming suddenly round a corner into a glade of silver birch trees Edmund saw the ground covered in all directions with little yellow flowers - celandines".

D. H. Lawrence mentions celandines frequently in Sons and Lovers. They appear to be a favorite of the protagonist, Paul Morel:

...going down the hedgeside with the girl, he noticed the celandines, scalloped splashes of gold, on the side of the ditch.

'I like them,' he said, 'when their petals go flat back with the sunshine. They seem to be pressing themselves at the sun.'

And then the celandines ever after drew her with a little spell.

Tove Jannson mentions it in her Summer Book collection of stories,

The first to come up was the scurvywort, only an inch high, but vital to seamen who live on ship's biscuit.

== See also ==
- Buttercup family
- Ancient woodland
