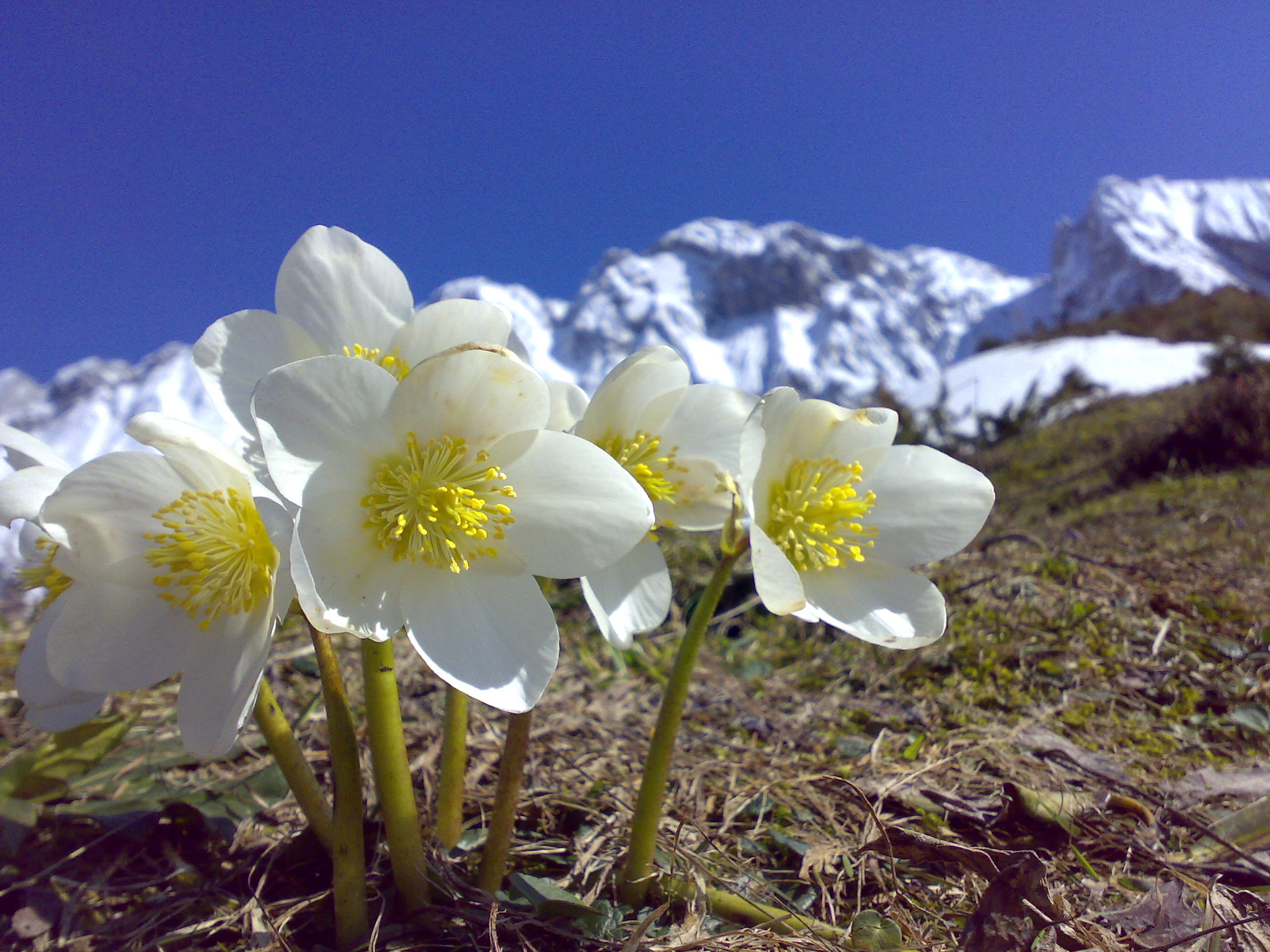

Scientific classification
- Kingdom: Plantae
- Clade: Tracheophytes
- Clade: Angiosperms
- Clade: Eudicots
- Order: Ranunculales
- Family: Ranunculaceae
- Genus: Helleborus
- Species: H. niger

Binomial name
- Helleborus niger L.

Subspecies
- Helleborus niger subsp. macranthus (Freyn) Schiffn.; Helleborus niger subsp. niger

= Helleborus niger =

Christmas rose

Species of flowering plant

Helleborus niger, commonly called Christmas rose or black hellebore, is an evergreen perennial flowering plant in the buttercup family, Ranunculaceae. It is one of about 20 species from the genus Helleborus. It is a poisonous cottage garden favourite because it flowers in the depths of winter.

Although the flowers resemble wild roses (and despite its common name), Christmas rose does not belong to the rose family (Rosaceae).

== Taxonomy ==
The black hellebore was described by Carl Linnaeus in volume one of his Species Plantarum in 1753. The Latin specific name niger (black) may refer to the colour of the roots. There are two subspecies: H. niger subsp. niger and H. niger subsp. macranthus, which has larger flowers (up to 3.75 in/9 cm across). In the wild, H. niger subsp. niger is generally found in mountainous areas in Switzerland, southern Germany, Austria, Slovenia, Croatia and northern Italy. Helleborus niger subsp. macranthus is found only in northern Italy and adjoining parts of Slovenia.

== Description ==
Helleborus niger is an evergreen plant with dark leathery pedate leaves carried on stems 9–12 in (23–30 cm) tall. The large flat flowers, borne on short stems from midwinter to early spring, are generally white, but occasionally with a pink tinge. The tips of the petals may be flushed pink or green, and there is a prominent central boss of yellow.

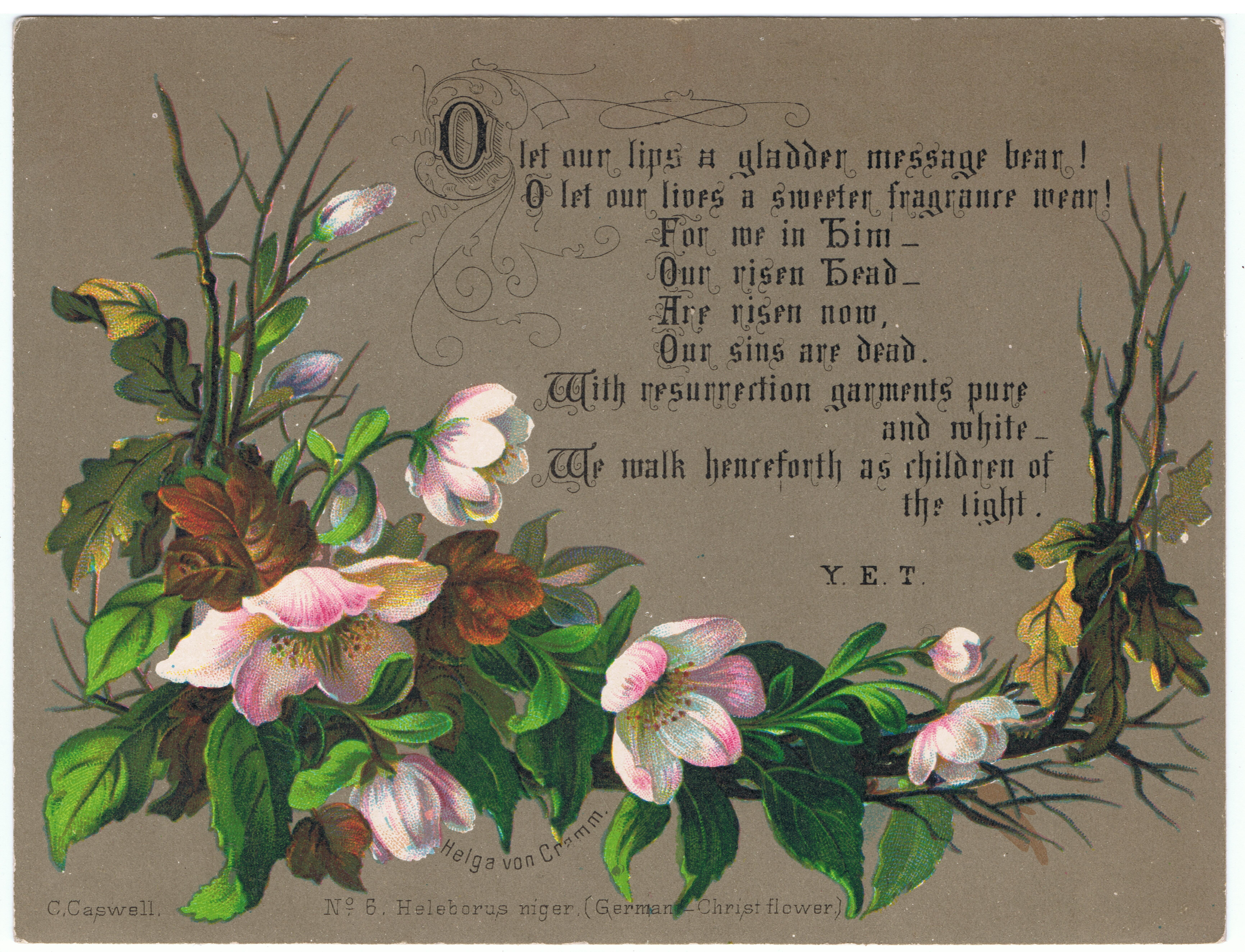
Heleborus niger, by Helga von Cramm, chromolithograh, with a prayer by Y.E.T., c. 1880.

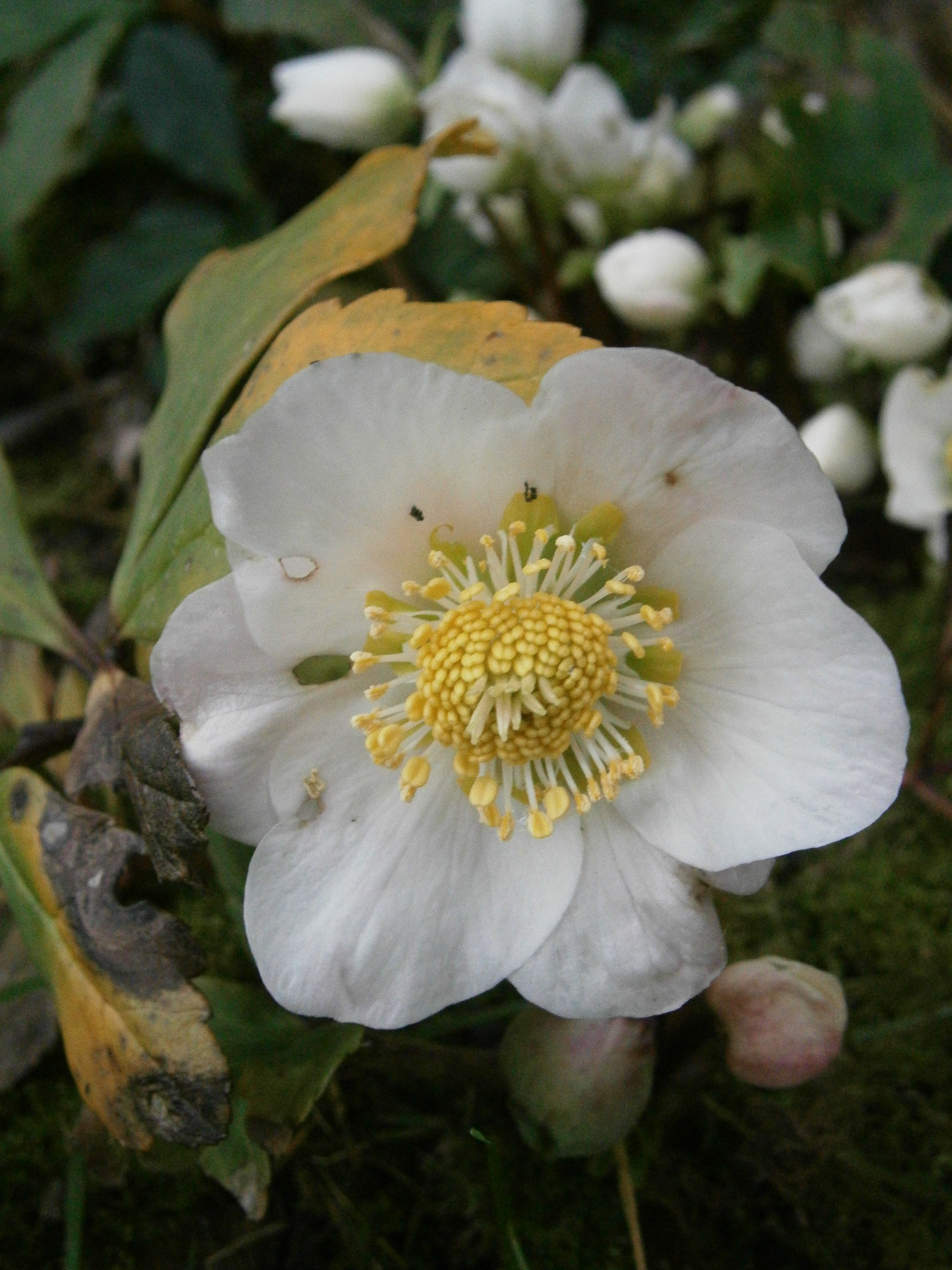
Christmas rose in a garden

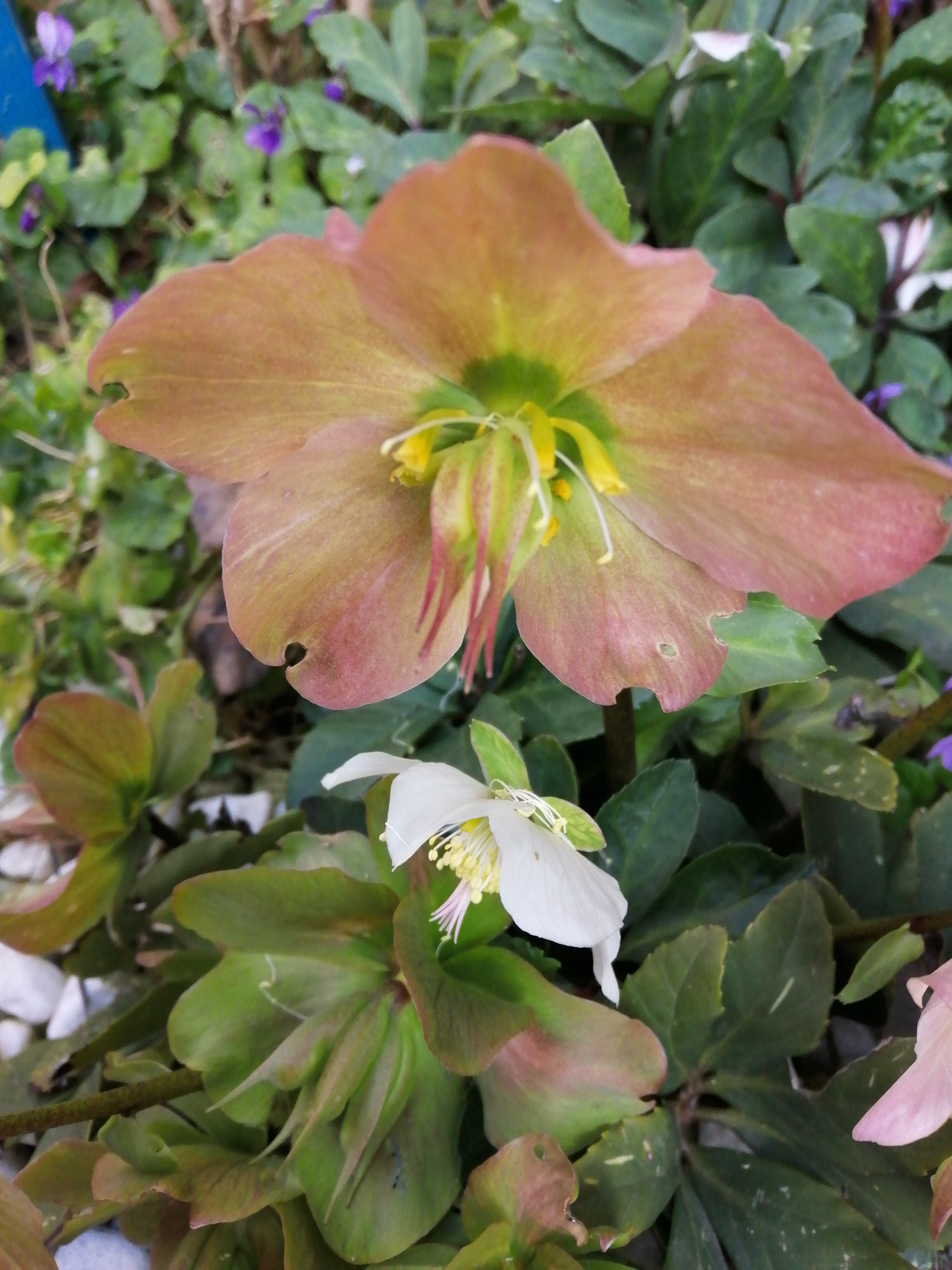
Flowers in two different stages, and fruits

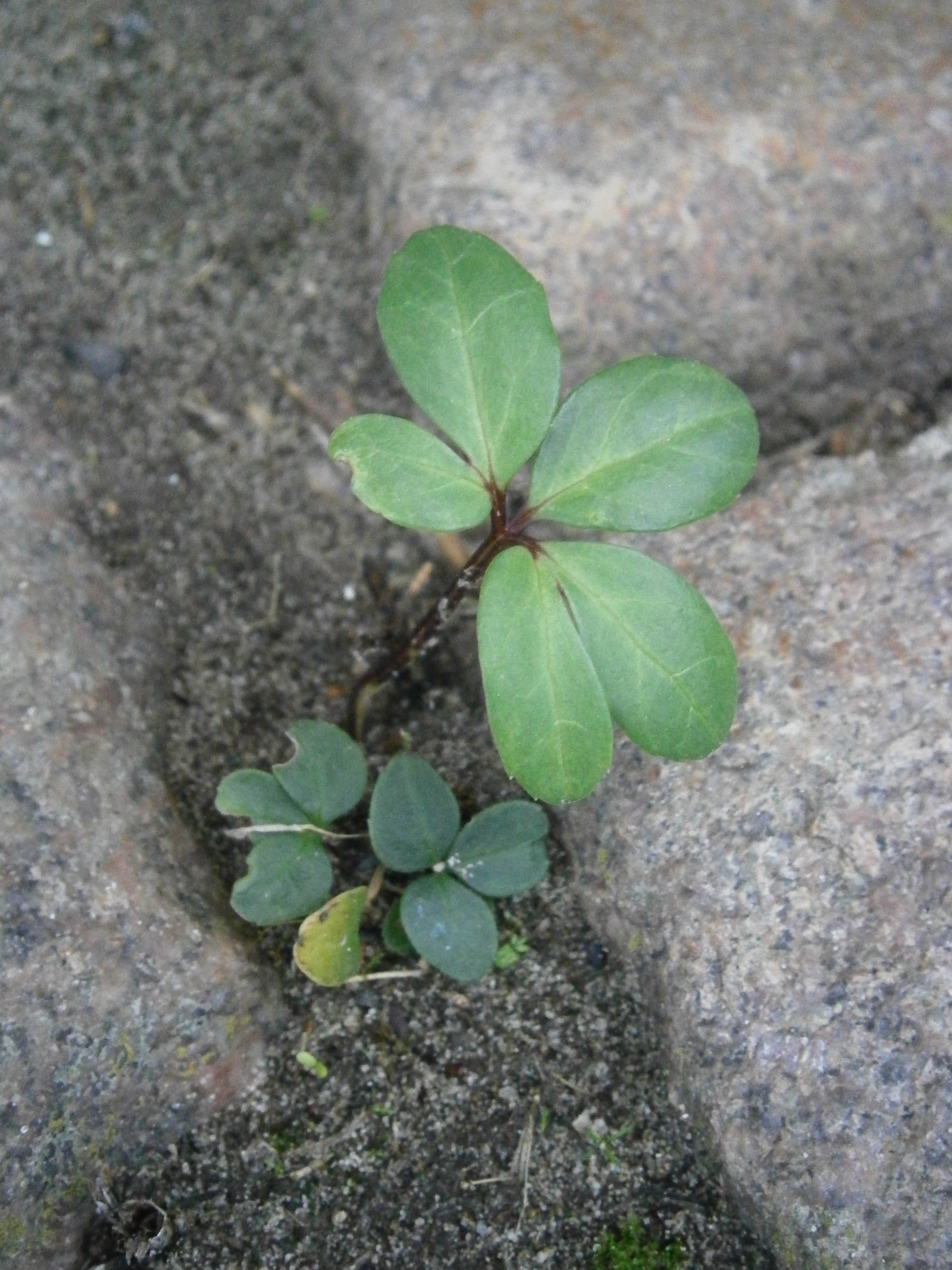
Volunteer seedling between paving stones

== Distribution ==
The natural distribution stretches from the eastern northern Alps (including the Julian Alps, Triglav) and southern Alps, west to Vorarlberg. In addition, Helleborus niger is common in the Apennines and northern Dinaric Alps of Slovenia and Croatia. It has been observed up to an elevation of 1900 meters. In the Berchtesgaden Alps, it grow up to an elevation of 1560 meters. In Germany, Helleborus niger is only native to Bavaria and in the Allgäu Alps Helleborus niger is not indigenous.

== Horticulture ==
The plant is a traditional cottage garden favourite because it flowers in the depths of winter. Large-flowered cultivars are available, as are pink-flowered and double-flowered selections. It has been awarded an Award of Garden Merit (AGM) H4 (hardy throughout the British Isles) by the Royal Horticultural Society, as has one of its hybrids (see below).

It can be difficult to grow well; acidic soil is unsuitable, as are poor, dry conditions and full sun. Moist, humus-rich, alkaline soil in dappled shade is preferable. Leaf-mould can be dug in to improve heavy clay or light sandy soils; lime can be added to 'sweeten' acid soils.

=== Cultivars ===
Since the 1950s, 'Potter's Wheel' has been one of the most famous names associated with H. niger. It originated with a self-sown seedling given by Major G. H. Tristram of Dallington, Sussex, to Hilda Davenport-Jones who had a nursery at nearby Washfield, Kent. The seedling proved to be exceptionally large-flowered, but it was too slow-growing to be 'bulked up' quickly, so she propagated it as a rigorously-selected uniform seed strain rather than as a vegetatively propagated cultivar.

- 'Potter's Wheel'
- 'Marion' (double-flowered; there are also other unnamed double selections)
- 'Praecox' (early flowering)

=== Hybrids ===
Nurserymen have tried for many years to cross H. niger with oriental hellebores (Lenten roses) H. × hybridus to increase the colour range available. Possible hybrids have been announced in the past, only to be disproved, but two crosses have been confirmed in recent years. 'Snow Queen', a white-flowered plant, arose spontaneously in Japan in the late 1990s, but does not look dramatically different from a good H. niger. Raised in 2000 by plant breeder David Tristram (whose father gave the first 'Potter's Wheel' to Washfield Nursery), Helleborus 'Walberton's Rosemary' is pink-flowered, extremely floriferous, and seems to be intermediate between its parents in many other characteristics.

Helleborus niger has proved easier to cross with other hellebore species. Crosses between it and H. argutifolius (formerly known as H. corsicus) are called H. × nigercors. First made in 1931, the hybrid is a large, tough plant with white flowers flushed with green; they are said to be the best of all hellebores for cut flowers. It has been awarded an AGM H4. Double-flowered plants are available.

Hybrids between H. niger and H. × sternii (itself a hybrid, between H. argutifolius and H. lividus) were originally called H. × nigristern, but this name has been changed in favour of H. × ericsmithii (commemorating the plantsman who made the cross in the 1960s and introduced it in 1972, through The Plantsmen nursery). At their best, the hybrids combine the hardiness of H. niger and H. argutifolius, the large flowers of H. niger, and the leaf and flower colour of H. lividus. Cultivars such as 'Bob's Best', 'HGC Silvermoon', 'Ruby Glow' and 'Winter Moonbeam' are available.

Helleborus niger has also been crossed with H. lividus; the hybrid was known informally as H. × nigriliv, but its correct name is H. × ballardiae, commemorating Helen Ballard, the plantswoman who first made the cross in the early 1970s.

== Poisonous constituents ==
All parts of the Christmas Rose plant are considered toxic upon consumption or physical contact with sap from damaged plant tissues. This is due to the fact that its organs contain varying levels of different glycosides - which are common plant defense mechanisms against herbivores and microorganisms.

=== Aerial toxins ===
The leaves, stems and flowers of Helleborus niger contain ranunculin and ranuncoside - glycosides whose breakdown yields the toxin protoanemonin when plant cells are damaged. Protoanemonin has an unpleasant taste and can cause irritation of the skin, mucosa and eyes upon contact. If large amounts are ingested, the toxin can cause itching and blistering of the mouth and throat as well as gastroenteritis and hematemesis in both humans and animals.

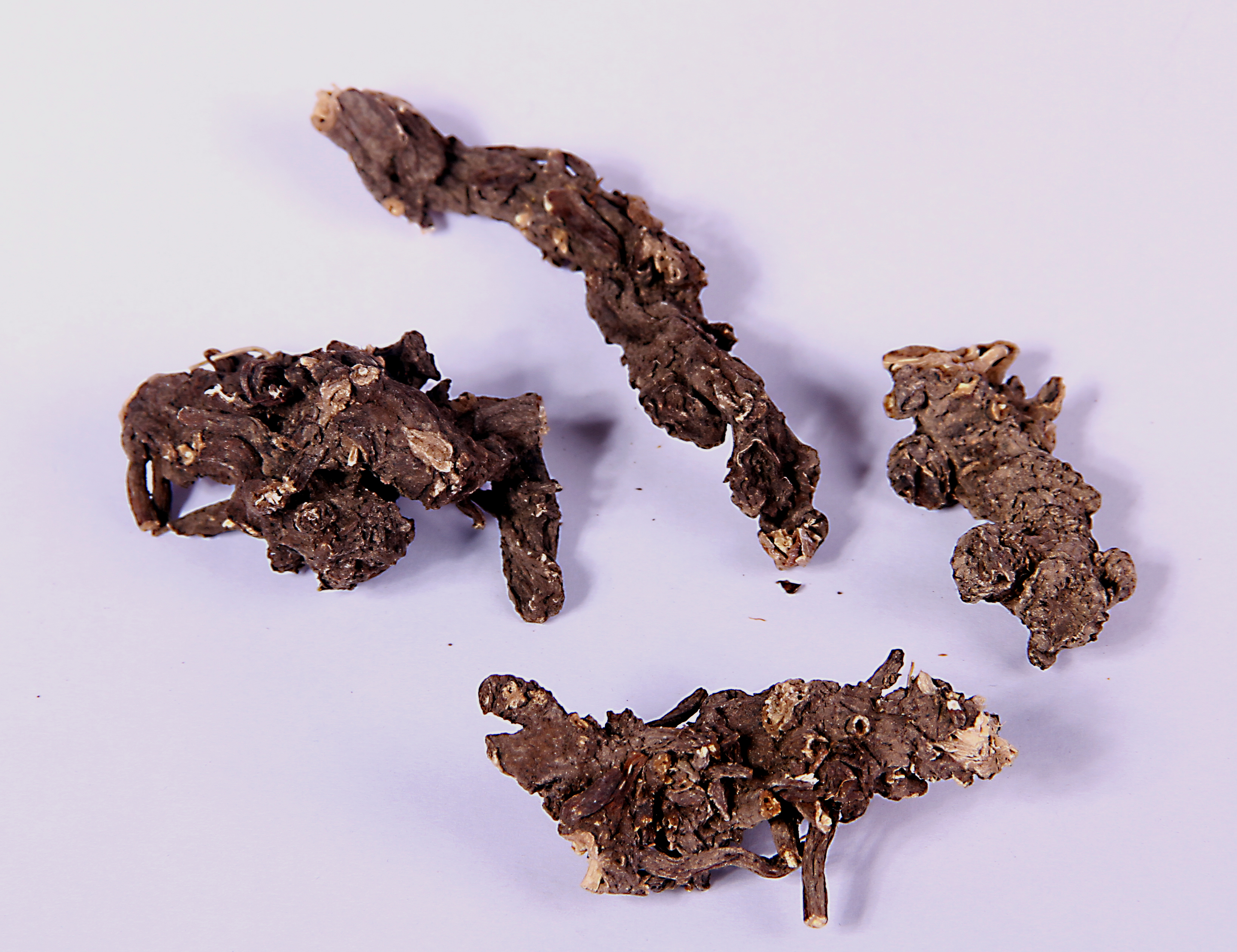
Black Helleborus Root

=== Root toxins ===
A key compound in the roots of Helleborus niger is Hellebrin, a bufadienolide which has similar cardiac activity but is less toxic than the cardiac glycosides found in Digitalis and Strophanthus plants. The degradation products of Hellebrin also strengthen heart contractions, but are more toxic than their parent molecule. The aglycon Hellebrigenin has the lowest lethal dose along with stronger cardiac activity than the original glucoside Hellebrin. Though rare, Hellebrin and its derivatives are considered responsible for severe or lethal Christmas Rose poisonings because their interference with the ion channels of the heart can lead to various arrhythmias.

== Folklore and early medicinal uses ==
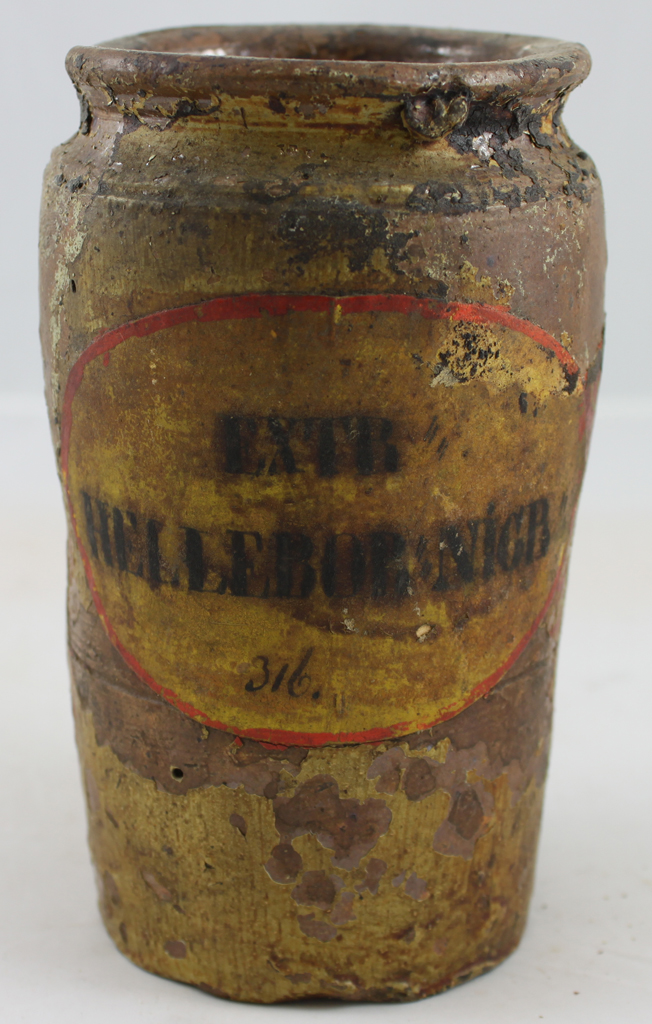
Medicinal jar with Extractum Hellebori nigri, Hamburg, first half of the 19th century.

Helleborus niger is commonly called the Christmas rose, due to an old legend that it sprouted in the snow from the tears of a young girl who had no gift to give the Christ child in Bethlehem.

One legend states that the flower blooms at the abbey in England founded by St. Thomas. It is said to bloom near the new calendar date of 6 January. This date had been Christmas Day under the old Julian calendar. So when Christmas Day under the new calendar came around and the flower did not bloom, it was such a frightful omen that England did not adopt the Gregorian calendar at that time in 1588; adoption had to wait until 1751.

In the Middle Ages, people strewed the flowers on the floors of their homes to drive out evil influences. They blessed their animals with it and used it to ward off the power of witches. These same people believed, however, that witches employed the herb in their spells and that sorcerers tossed the powdered herb into the air around them to make themselves invisible.

In the early days of medicine, two kinds of hellebore were recognized: black hellebore, which included various species of Helleborus, and white hellebore (now known as Veratrum album or "false hellebore", which belongs to a different plant family, the Melanthiaceae). Black hellebore was used by the ancients to treat insanity, melancholy, gout and epilepsy. It is also toxic, causing tinnitus, vertigo, stupor, thirst, a feeling of suffocation, swelling of the tongue and throat, emesis and catharsis, bradycardia (slowing of the pulse), and finally collapse and death from cardiac arrest. Research in the 1970s, however, showed that the roots of H. niger do not contain the cardiotoxic compounds helleborin, hellebrin, and helleborein that are responsible for the lethal reputation of black hellebore. It seems that earlier studies may have used a commercial preparation containing a mixture of material from other species such as Helleborus viridis, green hellebore.

In antiquity the most famous place for the black hellebore was the Phokian city of Antikyra in Greece.

Black hellebore was the dominant purgative of antiquity, frequently prescribed for that purpose by Hippocrates, the father of medicine, in the fifth century B.C. It was said to be introduced by Melampus, with which he healed the madness of the daughters of Proteus, king of Argos. The sedative property of hellebore was noted about one hundred years later by Theophrastus.
