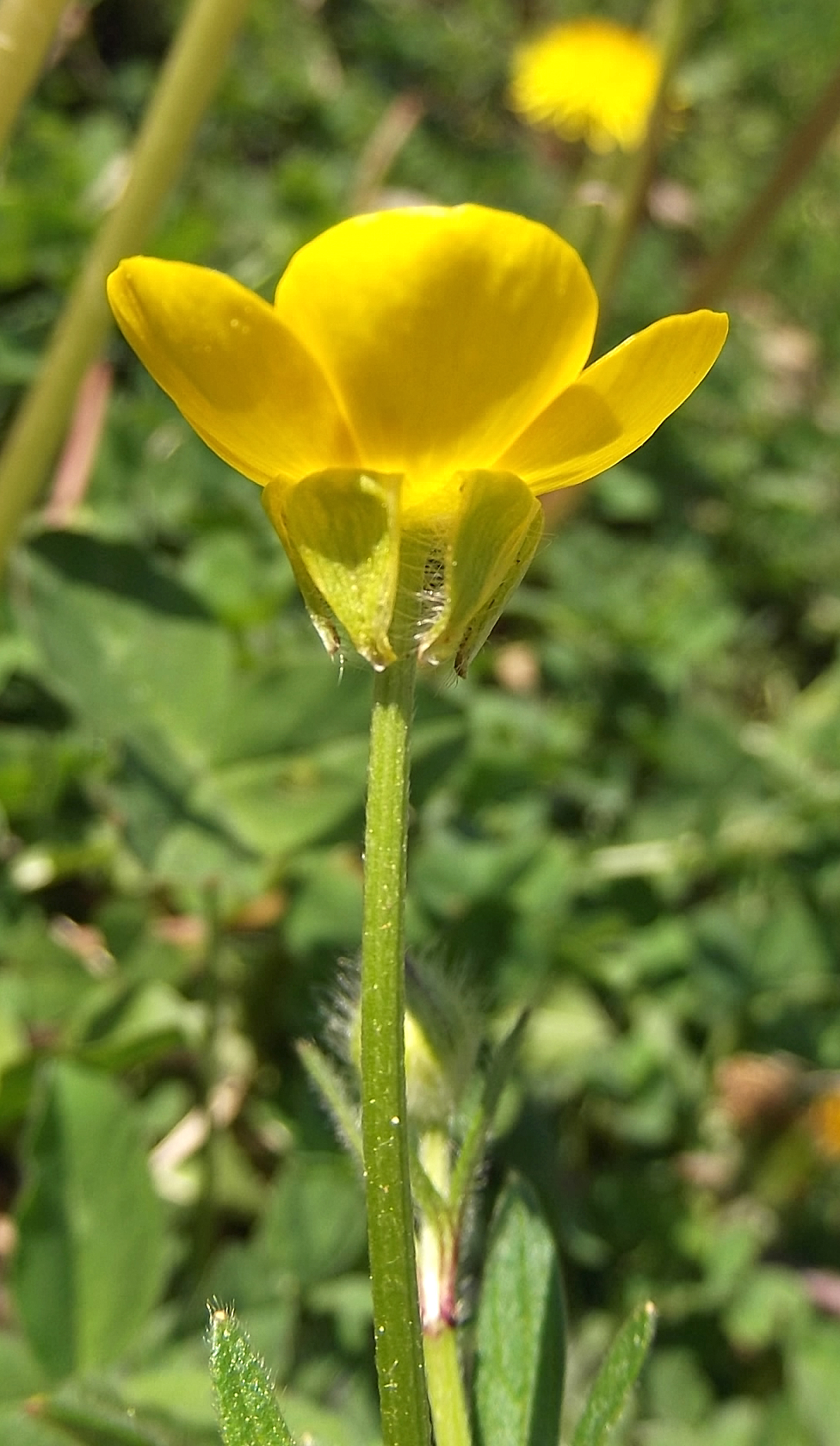

Scientific classification
- Kingdom: Plantae
- Clade: Embryophytes
- Clade: Tracheophytes
- Clade: Angiosperms
- Clade: Eudicots
- Order: Ranunculales
- Family: Ranunculaceae
- Genus: Ranunculus
- Species: R. bulbosus

Binomial name
- Ranunculus bulbosus L.

= Ranunculus bulbosus =

Species of flowering plant in the buttercup family

Ranunculus bulbosus, commonly known as bulbous buttercup or St. Anthony's turnip, is a perennial flowering plant in the buttercup family Ranunculaceae. It has bright yellow flowers, and deeply divided, three-lobed long-petioled basal leaves.

== Description ==
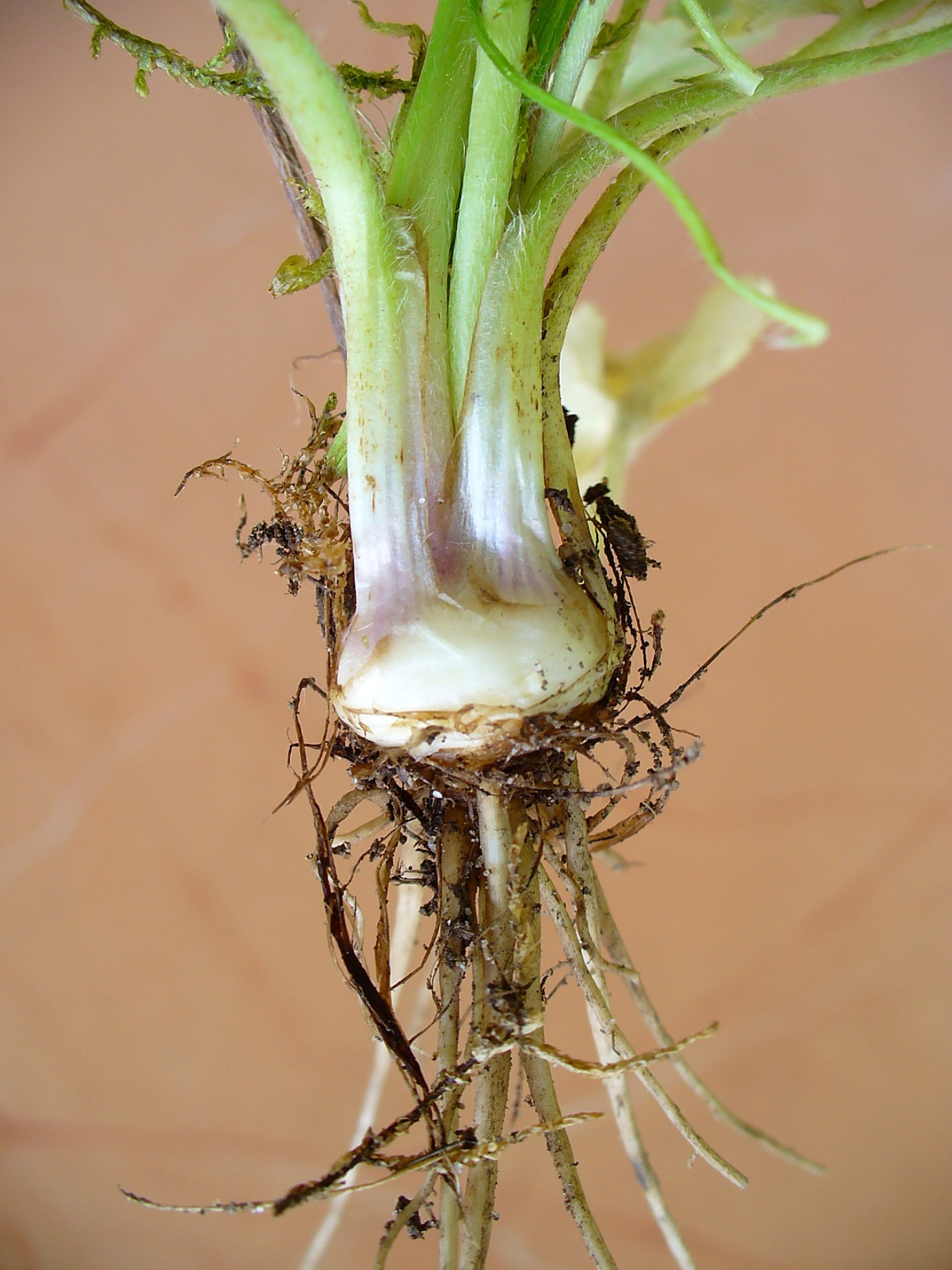
The “bulb” of the bulbous buttercup

The stems are 20–40 cm (8–16 in) tall, erect, branching, and slightly hairy, with a swollen corm-like base. There are alternate and sessile leaves on the stem. The flower forms at the apex of the stems, with 5–7 petals, the sepals strongly reflexed. The flowers are glossy yellow and 1.5–3 cm (0.6–1.2 in) wide. The plant blooms from April to July.

== Distribution ==
The native range of Ranunculus bulbosus is Western Europe between about 60°N and the Northern Mediterranean coast. It grows in both the eastern and western parts of North America as an introduced weed. Bulbous buttercup grows in lawns, pastures and fields in general, preferring nutrient-poor, well-drained soils. Although it doesn't generally grow in proper crops or improved grassland, it is often found in hay fields and in coastal grassland.

== Etymology ==
The bulbous buttercup gets its name from its distinctive perennating organ, a bulb-like swollen underground stem or corm, which is situated just below the soil surface. After the plant dies in heat of summer, the corm survives underground through the winter. Although the presence of a corm distinguishes Ranunculus bulbosus from some other species of buttercup such as Ranunculus acris, the species also has distinctive reflexed sepals.

Other names for the bulbous buttercup are "Goldcup" because of the colour and shape of the leaves, and "Frogs-foot" from their form.

== Uses and in culture ==
This plant, like other buttercups, contains the toxic glycoside ranunculin, which gives it a bitter, acrid taste, so cases of poisoning in humans are rare. It is also avoided by livestock when fresh, but when the plant dries the toxin is lost, so hay containing the plant is safe for animal consumption. Pigs are unaffected by the toxin and eat bulbous buttercups avidly, being prepared to travel long distances to find them; hence the folk name of the plant, St. Anthony's Turnip, after the patron saint of swineherds.

The flower appears in a children's game. One child asks another "Do you like butter?". They then hold a buttercup flower closely under that child's chin, and upon seeing the yellow reflection of the flower on the skin of the chin, say that "Yes, you like butter.".
