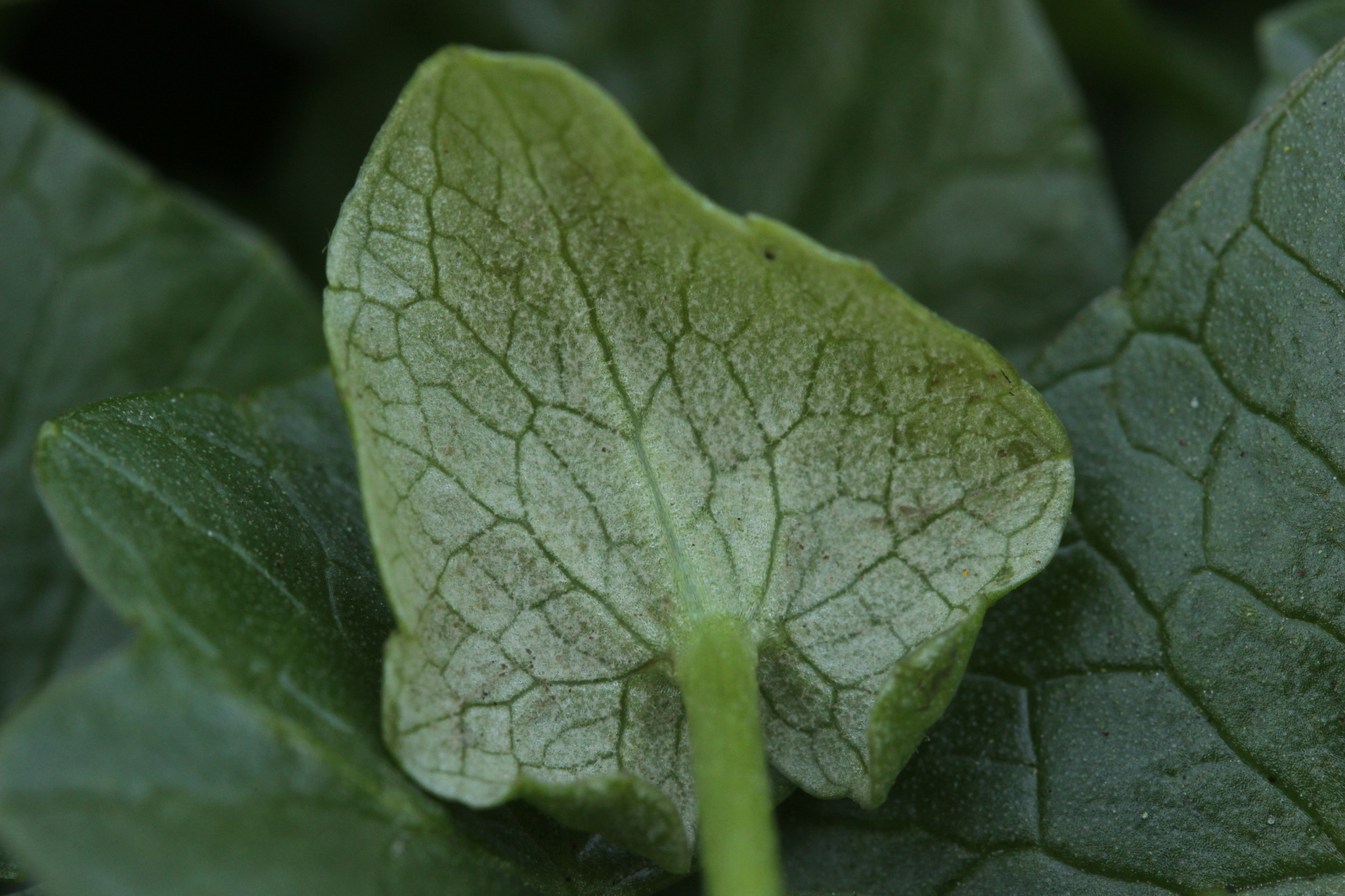
- Conidiophores of Peronospora ficariae on the underside of a leaf of Ficaria verna.

Scientific classification
- Domain: Eukaryota
- Clade: Sar
- Clade: Stramenopiles
- Phylum: Oomycota
- Class: Peronosporomycetes
- Order: Peronosporales
- Family: Peronosporaceae
- Genus: Peronospora
- Species: P. ficariae

Binomial name
- Peronospora ficariae Tulasne, 1854

= Peronospora ficariae =

Downy mildew

Peronospora ficariae is a downy mildew which infects Ficaria verna. It produces conidiophores on the underside of the leaves.

== Gallery ==
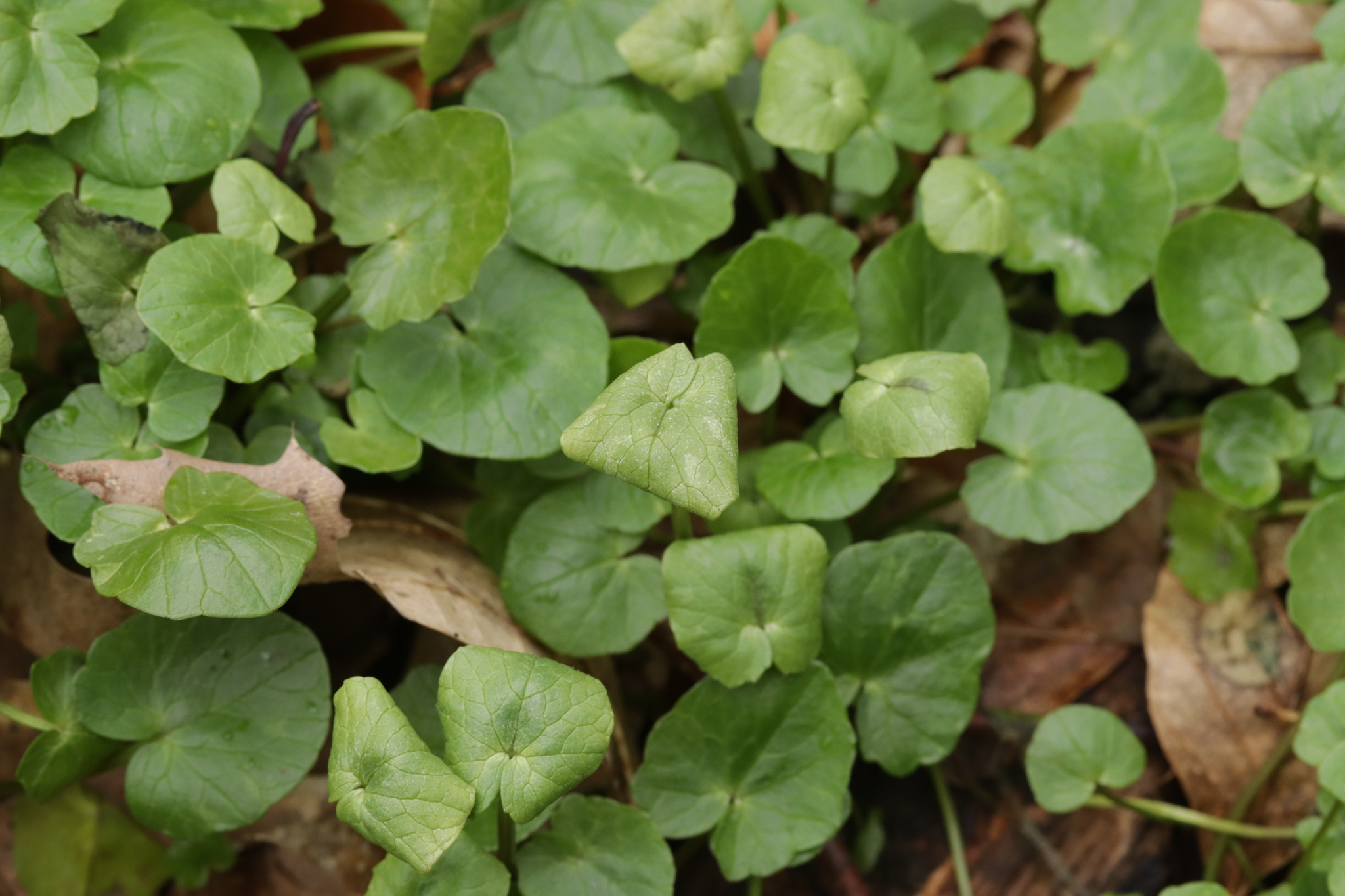
Yellowed, curled leaves of Ficaria verna infected with Peronospora ficariae.
