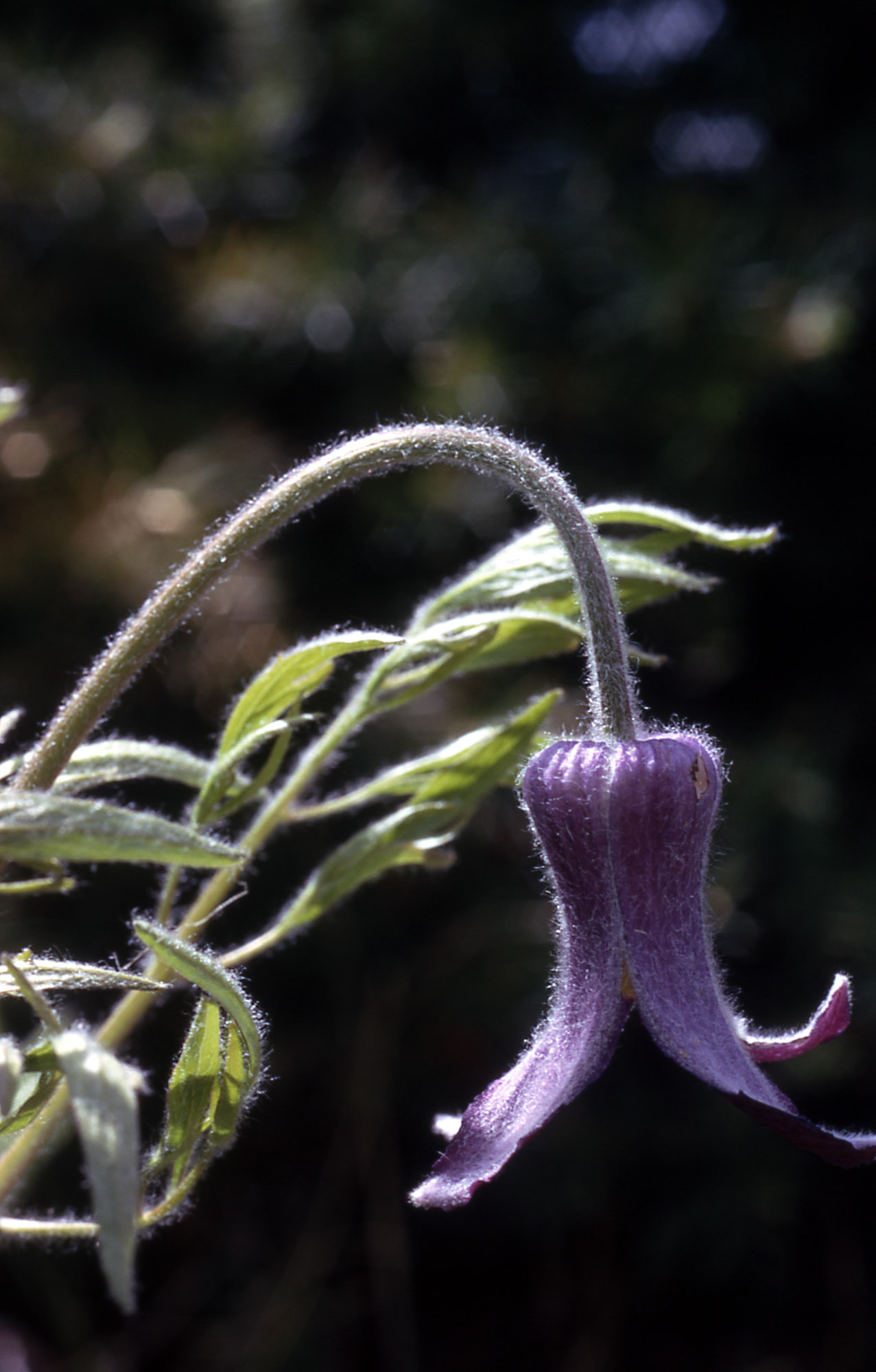

Conservation status
- Apparently Secure (NatureServe)

Scientific classification
- Kingdom: Plantae
- Clade: Tracheophytes
- Clade: Angiosperms
- Clade: Eudicots
- Order: Ranunculales
- Family: Ranunculaceae
- Genus: Clematis
- Species: C. hirsutissima

Binomial name
- Clematis hirsutissima Pursh

= Clematis hirsutissima =

Species of flowering plant

Clematis hirsutissima is a species of flowering plant in the buttercup family known by the common name hairy clematis or vase flower. It is a perennial herb that is native to much of the western United States, from Washington to Nebraska. It is a small, erect plant which, unlike other Clematis, does not generally produce vines. It is quite variable in appearance, especially across varieties. In general the hairy stem reaches up to about half a meter tall and has many large hairy leaves divided into lance-shaped lobes. The inflorescence appears at the tip of the stem and bears a solitary flower. The flower is made up of an urn-shaped cup of deep purple-blue petal like sepals, which are fuzzy and have pointed or rounded tips. Rare individuals have white or pinkish sepals. There are no true petals. The fruit is a hairy achene with a very long beak and a plume on the end; it is dispersed by wind.

The roots are large, deep reaching, and many branched. They produce a large crown with many dormant buds. It is often dormant in summer.

It grows in grasslands, sagebrush plains, and ponderosa forests.

== Cultivation ==
Clematis hirsutissima var. scottii is valued for xeriscaping and in rock gardening particularly in its native range. The compact mound of foliage and many blossoms of well developed plants are regarded as handsome by many including noted wildflower writer Claude A. Barr. It can be successfully divided for vegetative reproduction.
