= Protoanemonin =

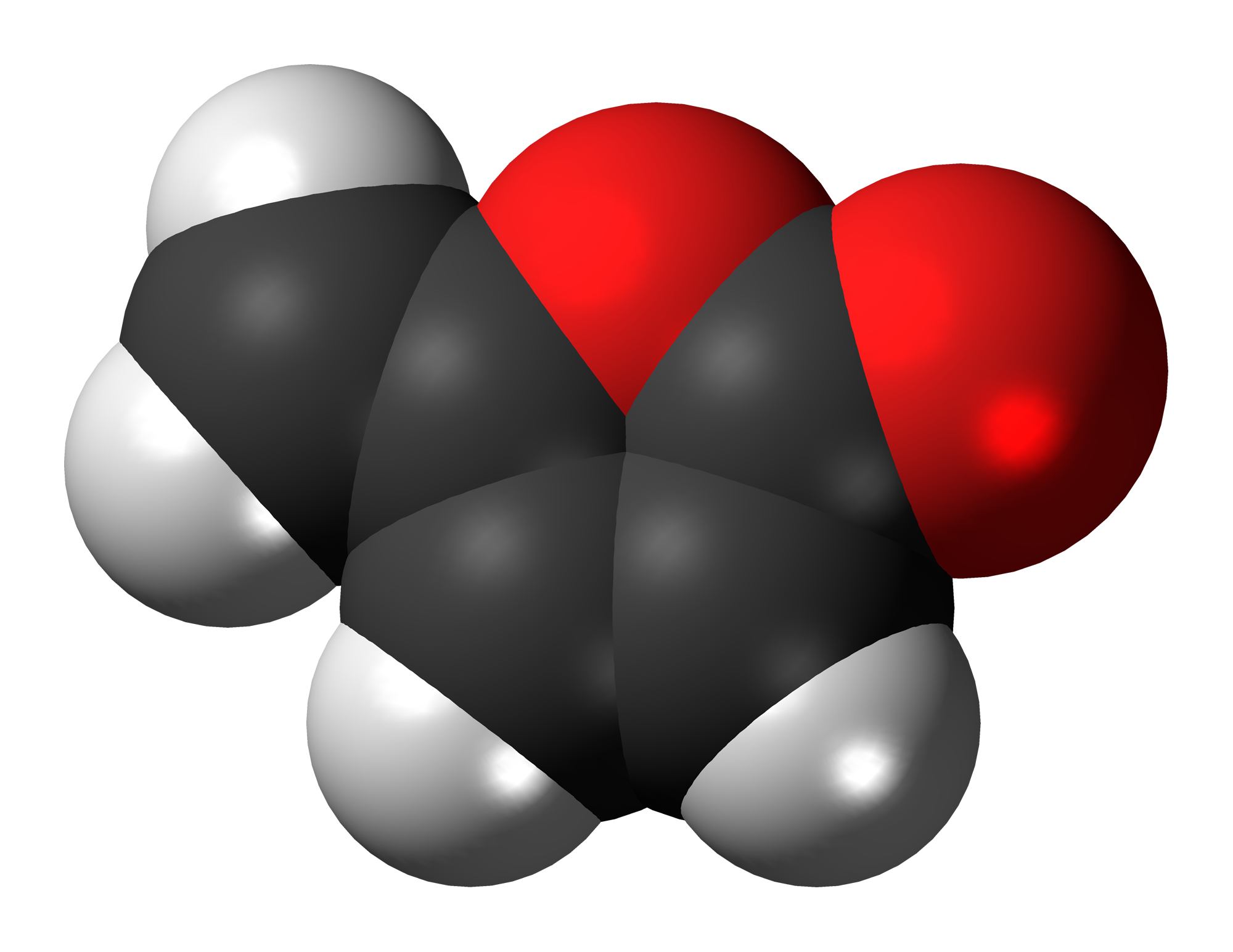

Names
- Preferred IUPAC name 5-Methylidenefuran-2(5H)-one
- Other names 4-Methylenebut-2-en-4-olide

Identifiers
CAS Number	108-28-1
3D model (JSmol)	Interactive image
ChemSpider	60307
ECHA InfoCard	100.003.244
PubChem CID	66948
UNII	66FQZ1A5SO
CompTox Dashboard (EPA)	DTXSID10148346
- InChI: InChI=1S/C5H4O2/c1-4-2-3-5(6)7-4/h2-3H,1H2 Key: RNYZJZKPGHQTJR-UHFFFAOYSA-N; InChI=1/C5H4O2/c1-4-2-3-5(6)7-4/h2-3H,1H2 Key: RNYZJZKPGHQTJR-UHFFFAOYAD
- SMILES: C=C1C=CC(=O)O1

Properties
Chemical formula	C_{5}H_{4}O_{2}
Molar mass	96.085 g·mol^{−1}
Appearance	Pale yellow oil
Boiling point	73 °C (163 °F; 346 K)

Hazards
- Lethal dose or concentration (LD, LC)
LD_{50} (median dose)	190 mg·kg^{−1} (mouse)
- Except where otherwise noted, data are given for materials in their standard state (at 25 °C [77 °F], 100 kPa). verify (what is ?) Infobox references

Protoanemonin (sometimes called anemonol or ranunculol) is a toxin whose glycosidic precursor ranunculin is found in many plants of the buttercup family (Ranunculaceae). When the plant is wounded or macerated, ranunculin is enzymatically broken down into glucose and protoanemonin. This toxin's ability to inhibit both gram positive and gram negative bacteria is linked to the presence of a 5-membered lactone ring with a highly reactive double bond system.

== Biological pathway ==
	ranunculin
↓ – glucose	(maceration, enzymatically)
	protoanemonin
↓ dimerization	(spontaneous)
	anemonin
↓ hydrolyzation
	4,7-dioxo-2-decenedioic acid

=== Toxicity ===
Protoamenonin has vesicant properties, which cause rashes or blistering upon contact with the skin or mucosa. Ingesting large amounts of the toxin despite its bitter taste can cause nausea, vomiting, dizziness, spasms, acute hepatitis, jaundice, or paralysis in animals and humans.

=== Safety ===
At room temperature, protoanemonin spontaneously dimerizes into the potentially therapeutic compound anemonin, which can then be hydrolyzed into a dicarboxylic acid. As such, plants containing glycosidic precursors of protoanemonin are considered safe for humans to handle and livestock to eat after being properly harvested and dried into hay. The hydrolization product of anemonin- anemoninic acid- is also non-toxic but lacks its potentially therapeutic antimicrobial activity, having lost the highly reactive unsaturated lactone ring. This makes anemonin of greater interest for the synthesis of therapeutic compounds.

== Synthesis ==
A patent from 1955 describes a method for extracting protoanemonin from fresh plants, but the extract must be kept at nearly neutral pH and requires the addition of some radical scavenger to avoid spontaneous formation of anemonin. Depending on the specific amount of added weak acid and storage temperature, solutions of extracted protoanemonin have been reported to be able to retain their potency for periods ranging from days to months. Due to the variable stability of protoanemonin solutions obtained by complicated fresh plant extractions, reliable synthetic preparation has been pursued from many starting points. Methods starting from levulinic acid- widely used in the early 2000s- require tedious extraction steps and have been associated with difficult replication of results, while a novel catalytic oxidation of silvan required extreme conditions. In 2006, a paper was published detailing a convenient synthesis that proceeds through a crystal which is stable for storage at room temperature. When stirred with triethylamine overnight, this solid affords protoanemonin with an 80% yield; Kotera and colleagues balance simplicity and efficiency well, as the overall yield of protoanemonin from this 4 step synthesis is 46%.

	2-Deoxy-D-ribose
↓ HCl, MeOH
2	1-O-Methyl-2-Deoxy-D-ribose
↓ TolCl/pyridine
3
↓ MCPBA/ BF3-OEt2
4	Crystalline solid; 58% overall yield
↓ 5eq. NEt3 (stirred overnight)	80% yield
	Protoanemonin; 46% overall yield
