= Ranunculin =

Names
- IUPAC name (5S)-5-[(β-D-Glucopyranosyloxy)methyl]furan-2(5H)-one
- Systematic IUPAC name (5S)-5-({[(2R,3R,4S,5S,6R)-3,4,5-Trihydroxy-6-(hydroxymethyl)oxan-2-yl]oxy}methyl)furan-2(5H)-one

Identifiers
| CAS Number | 644-69-9 |
| 3D model (JSmol) | Interactive image |
| ChemSpider | 390250 |
| ECHA InfoCard | 100.010.384 |
| PubChem CID | 441581 |
| UNII | IBP7446K1O |
| CompTox Dashboard (EPA) | DTXSID40982977 |
- InChI: InChI=1S/C11H16O8/c12-3-6-8(14)9(15)10(16)11(19-6)17-4-5-1-2-7(13)18-5/h1-2,5-6,8-12,14-16H,3-4H2/t5-,6+,8+,9-,10+,11+/m0/s1 Key: TYWXNGXVSZRXNA-NVZSGMJQSA-N; InChI=1/C11H16O8/c12-3-6-8(14)9(15)10(16)11(19-6)17-4-5-1-2-7(13)18-5/h1-2,5-6,8-12,14-16H,3-4H2/t5-,6+,8+,9-,10+,11+/m0/s1 Key: TYWXNGXVSZRXNA-NVZSGMJQBP
- SMILES: C1=CC(=O)OC1COC2C(C(C(C(O2)CO)O)O)O

Properties
| Chemical formula | C_{11}H_{16}O_{8} |
| Molar mass | 276.241 g·mol^{−1} |
| Melting point | 141 to 142 °C (286 to 288 °F; 414 to 415 K) |
- Except where otherwise noted, data are given for materials in their standard state (at 25 °C [77 °F], 100 kPa). verify (what is ?) Infobox references

Ranunculin is a glycoside found in many members of the buttercup family, including species of Helleborus, Anemone, Clematis and most commonly Ranunculus. Glycosides are common in plants, where they serve as defense mechanisms against herbivores and microorganisms. When plant cell wall structures are damaged, glycosidase enzymes hydrolyze the inactive glycoside into its components- a sugar and practically any other molecule, which is called the aglycone. Ranunculin is a glucoside, which indicates that glucose is the specific sugar attached its aglycone protoanemonin.

== Toxicity ==
Ranunculin is very stable in acidic medium and fresh plant tissues, but in alkaline solution or damaged plant cells is hydrolyzed into the unstable toxin protoanemonin and glucose.

=== Protoanemonin release ===
| | ranunculin |
| ↓ – glucose | (plant wounded, aglycone release) |
| | protoanemonin |
